= SM Town Live =

Concert tours held by SM Entertainment

- World tour by SM Entertainment artists
- Location: Worldwide
- Start date: August 15, 2008
- No. of shows: 97

SM Town Live (stylized as SMTOWN LIVE) is a series of concert tours held by SM Entertainment, in which artists in the label would unite and perform together in a three-to-five-hour long concert. The show consisting of each artist's own performance as well as a special stage where artists join and perform. The SM Town Live begun in 2008, and since 2010, the concert frequently be held at least one show during the summer of each year as an annual concert of the label.

== Background ==
After the successful first joint concert tour on 2008, SM Entertainment announced that it had established its artists to perform concerts abroad on tour titled the SMTOWN LIVE World Tour.

== SMTOWN Live '08 ==
SMTOWN Live '08
- Tour by SM Entertainment artists
- Location: Asia
- Start date: August 15, 2008
- End date: February 7, 2009
- Legs: 1
- No. of shows: 3
- Attendance: 110,000

SMTOWN Live '08 was a 2008, first joint concert tour of SMTOWN. The tour started with one show in Seoul in August 2008 and continued to the China and Thailand.

=== Performers ===
Seoul, South Korea (August 15, 2008)
- BoA
- The Grace
- Girls' Generation
- Chu Gayeoul
- Song Kwangsik
- SHINee
- Super Junior (except Zhou Mi and Henry)
- TVXQ
- Zhang Liyin
Shanghai, China (September 13, 2008)
- The Grace
- Girls' Generation
- Zhang Liyin
- SHINee
- Super Junior
- TVXQ
Bangkok, Thailand (February 7, 2009)
- The Grace
- Girls' Generation
- Zhang Liyin
- SHINee
- Super Junior
- TVXQ
Notes
- During the show in Bangkok, it was the last time TVXQ performed as a five-member group before Hero Jaejoong, Micky Yoochun, and Xiah Junsu left the group and started a lawsuit against SM Entertainment.
- During the show in Bangkok, Hangeng performed as a Super Junior member for the last time before the contract termination.
- During the show in Bangkok, Kibum performed as a Super Junior member for the last time before becoming an actor.

=== Shows ===
Date	City	Country	Venue	Attendance
Asia
August 15, 2008	Seoul	South Korea	Seoul Olympic Stadium	40,000
September 13, 2008	Shanghai	China	Shanghai Stadium	30,000
February 7, 2009	Bangkok	Thailand	Rajamangala National Stadium	40,000

== SMTOWN Live '10 World Tour ==
SMTOWN Live '10 World Tour
- World tour by SM Entertainment artists
- Location: Worldwide
- Start date: August 21, 2010
- End date: October 23, 2011
- Legs: 6
- No. of shows: 11
- Attendance: 283,000

SMTOWN Live '10 World Tour was a 2010 to 2011 worldwide live concert tour by SMTOWN. The tour started with one show in Seoul in August 2010 and continued to the United States, Japan, China, and France.

=== Performers ===
Seoul, South Korea (August 21, 2010)
- BoA
- f(x) (except Amber)
- Girls' Generation
- The Grace (except Stephanie)
- J-Min
- Kangta
- SHINee
- Super Junior
- Super Junior - M
- TRAX
- TVXQ
- Zhang Liyin
- Kim Minjong
- Go Ara
- Lee Yeonhee
Los Angeles, United States (September 4, 2010)
- BoA
- f(x) (except Amber)
- Girls' Generation
- The Grace (only Dana and Sunday)
- J-Min
- Kangta
- SHINee
- Super Junior
- Super Junior - M
- TRAX
- TVXQ
- Zhang Liyin
- Kim Minjong
- Go Ara
- Lee Yeonhee
Shanghai, China (September 11, 2010)
- BoA
- f(x) (except Amber)
- Girls' Generation
- Kangta
- SHINee
- Super Junior
- Super Junior - M
- TRAX
- TVXQ (only U-Know and MAX)
- Zhang Liyin
Tokyo, Japan (January 25–26, 2011)
- BoA
- f(x) (except Amber)
- Girls' Generation
- J-Min
- Kangta
- SHINee
- Super Junior
- Super Junior - M
- TRAX
- TVXQ (only U-Know and MAX)
Paris (June 10–11, 2011)
- f(x)
- Girls' Generation
- SHINee
- Super Junior
- TVXQ (only U-Know and MAX)
Tokyo, Japan (September 2–4, 2011)
- BoA
- f(x)
- Girls' Generation (except Sooyoung)
- The Grace (only Dana and Sunday)
- J-Min
- Kangta
- Kim Minjong
- SHINee
- Super Junior (except Heechul)
- Super Junior - M
- TVXQ (only U-Know and MAX)
New York, United States (October 23, 2011)
- BoA
- f(x)
- Girls' Generation
- Kangta
- SHINee
- Super Junior (except Heechul and Siwon)
- Super Junior - M
- TVXQ (only U-Know and MAX)

=== Shows ===
Date	City	Country	Venue	Attendance
Asia
August 21, 2010	Seoul	South Korea	Seoul Olympic Stadium	40,000
North America
September 4, 2010	Los Angeles	United States	Staples Center	15,000
Asia
September 11, 2010	Shanghai	China	Hongkou Football Stadium	25,000
January 25, 2011	Tokyo	Japan	Yoyogi National Gymnasium	40,000
January 26, 2011	Tokyo	Japan	Yoyogi National Gymnasium	40,000
Europe
June 10, 2011	Paris	France	Zénith Paris	14,000
June 11, 2011	Paris	France	Zénith Paris	14,000
Asia
September 2, 2011	Tokyo	Japan	Tokyo Dome	150,000
September 3, 2011	Tokyo	Japan	Tokyo Dome	150,000
September 4, 2011	Tokyo	Japan	Tokyo Dome	150,000
North America
October 23, 2011	New York	United States	Madison Square Garden	15,000
Total				283,000

== SMTOWN Live World Tour III ==
SMTOWN Live World Tour III
- World tour by SM Entertainment artists
- Start date: May 20, 2012
- End date: October 27, 2013
- Legs: 2
- No. of shows: 11
- Attendance: 556,000

SMTOWN Live World Tour III was a 2012 to 2013 worldwide live concert tour by SMTOWN. The tour started with one show in United States in May 2012 and continued to China, Japan, South Korea, Indonesia, Singapore, and Thailand

=== Performers ===
Anaheim, USA (May 20, 2012)

Performers

- BoA
- TVXQ
- f(x)
- Super Junior^{[A]}
- SHINee
- Girls' Generation^{[B]}
- EXO

^{A} Siwon was absent due to his filming schedule of the Chinese drama Zhuan Shen Shuo Ai Ni while Heechul was absent due to his active military service.
^{B} Yoona and Yuri were both absent due to their filming schedules of the dramas Love Rain and Fashion King respectively.

Hsinchu, Taiwan (June 9, 2012)

Performers

- BoA
- TVXQ
- f(x)
- Super Junior^{[A]}
- Super Junior-M
- Zhang Liyin
- SHINee
- Girls' Generation
- EXO

^{A} Siwon was absent due to his filming schedule of the Chinese drama Zhuan Shen Shuo Ai Ni while Heechul was absent due to his active military service.

Tokyo, Japan (August 4–5, 2012)

Performers

- Kangta
- BoA
- TVXQ
- The Grace - Dana & Sunday
- Super Junior^{[A]}
- Super Junior-M
- f(x)^{[B]}
- J-Min
- SHINee^{[B]}
- Girls' Generation
- EXO^{[C]}

^{A} Heechul was absent due to his active military service.
^{B} Minho and Sulli were both absent due to the filming schedule of their drama To the Beautiful You.
^{C} Because of Minho's absence from SHINee, EXO-M's Luhan filled in for him as a guest dancer during SHINee's performance of "Lucifer" while EXO-K's Sehun filled in during SHINee's performance of "Love Like Oxygen".

Seoul, South Korea (August 18, 2012)

Performers

- Kangta
- BoA
- TVXQ
- The Grace - Dana & Sunday
- Super Junior^{[A]}
- Super Junior-M
- Zhang Liyin
- Chu Ga Yeol
- f(x)^{[B]}
- SHINee^{[B]}
- Girls' Generation
- EXO^{[C]}

^{A} Heechul was absent due to his active military service.
^{B} Minho and Sulli were both absent due to the filming schedule of their drama To the Beautiful You.
^{C} Because of Minho's absence from SHINee, EXO-M's Luhan filled in for him as a guest dancer during SHINee's performance of "Lucifer" while EXO-K's Sehun filled in during SHINee's performance of "Love Like Oxygen".

Jakarta, Indonesia (September 22, 2012)

Performers

- Kangta
- BoA
- TVXQ
- Super Junior^{[A]} ^{[B]}
- Super Junior-M
- f(x)^{[D]}
- SHINee^{[D]}
- Girls' Generation^{[C]}
- EXO^{[E]}

^{A} Heechul was absent due to his active military service.
^{B} Leeteuk suffered a stomach ache during the concert and did not take part the rest performances of the show.
^{C} Sunny did not take part in the ending song "Hope".
^{D} Minho and Sulli were both absent due to the filming schedule of their drama To the Beautiful You.
^{E} Because of Minho's absence from SHINee, EXO-M's Luhan filled in for him as a guest dancer during SHINee's performance of "Lucifer" while EXO-K's Sehun filled in during SHINee's performance of "Love Like Oxygen".

Singapore (November 23, 2012)

Performers

- Kangta
- BoA
- TVXQ
- Super Junior^{[A]} ^{[B]} ^{[C]}
- Super Junior-M
- f(x)
- SHINee
- Girls' Generation
- EXO

^{A} Heechul was absent due to his active military service.
^{B} Leeteuk was absent due to illness.
^{C} Siwon was absent due to his filming schedule of the drama The King of Dramas.

Bangkok, Thailand (November 25, 2012)

Performers

- Kangta
- BoA
- TVXQ
- Super Junior^{[A]} ^{[B]} ^{[C]}
- Super Junior-M
- f(x)
- SHINee
- Girls' Generation
- EXO

^{A} Heechul was absent due to his active military service.
^{B} Leeteuk was absent due to illness.
^{C} Siwon was absent due to his filming schedule of the drama The King of Dramas.

Beijing, China (October 19, 2013)

Performers

- Kangta
- BoA
- TVXQ
- Super Junior ^{[A]} ^{[B]} ^{[C]}
- Super Junior-M
- f(x) ^{[E]}
- SHINee ^{[D]}
- Girls' Generation
- EXO
- Zhang Liyin
- TASTY

^{A} Leeteuk was absent due to illness.
^{B} Yesung was absent due to his active military service.
^{C} Siwon was absent due to the filming of his Chinese movie Helios.
^{D} Minho was absent due to the filming of his drama Medical Top Team.
^{E} Krystal was absent due to the filming of her drama The Heirs.

Tokyo, Japan (October 26–27, 2013)

Performers

- Kangta
- BoA
- TVXQ
- The Grace-Dana & Sunday
- Super Junior ^{[A]} ^{[B]} ^{[C]}
- Super Junior-M
- f(x) ^{[E]}
- J-Min
- SHINee ^{[D]}
- Girls' Generation
- EXO

^{A} Leeteuk was absent due to illness.
^{B} Yesung was absent due to his active military service.
^{C} Siwon was absent due to the filming of his Chinese movie Helios.
^{D} Minho was absent due to the filming of his drama Medical Top Team.
^{E} Krystal was absent due to the filming of her drama The Heirs
^{F} Krystal Was not absent during this tour day as it is proven by video captured of the event. Sulli

== SMTOWN Live World Tour IV ==
SMTOWN Live World Tour IV
- World tour by SM Entertainment artists
- Start date: August 15, 2014
- End date: July 26, 2015
- Legs: 1
- No. of shows: 9
- Attendance: 400,000

SM Town Live World Tour IV was the 2014 to 2015 worldwide live concert tour by SMTOWN. The tour commenced with one show in Seoul and then continued in Tokyo, Shanghai, Hsinchu.

=== Performers ===
Seoul, South Korea (August 15, 2014)

Performers

- Kangta
- BoA
- TVXQ
- Super Junior ^{[A]}
  - Super Junior-M
- Girls' Generation
- SHINee ^{[B]}
- f(x) ^{[C]}
- EXO ^{[D]}
- Zhang Liyin
- J-Min
- Red Velvet
- Fly to the Sky ^{[E]}
- SM Rookies^{[F]}

^{A} Yesung was absent due to his active military service.
^{B} Onew was absent due to health condition.
^{C} Sulli was absent due to her hiatus.
^{D} Kris was absent due to lawsuit.
^{E} Fly to the Sky is the former male group from S.M Entertainment. They acted as special guest in the concert due to Lee Soo Man's invititation.
^{F} Members who participated on this leg were Hansol, Johnny, Taeyong, Yuta, Ten, Jaehyun, Yeri, Koeun, Mark, Jeno, Haechan, Hina, Jaemin, Jisung, Herin, Jeesu, and Winny.

Tokyo, Japan (October 4–5, 2014)

Performers

- BoA
- TVXQ
- Super Junior ^{[A]}
  - Super Junior-M
- Girls' Generation ^{[B]}
- SHINee
- f(x) ^{[C]}
- EXO ^{[D]}
- J-Min
- Red Velvet
- SM Rookies^{[E]}

^{A} Yesung was absent due to his active military service.
^{B} Jessica was absent due to her recent departure from Girls' Generation. Sooyoung was absent due to the filming schedule of the drama My Spring Days.
^{C} Sulli was absent due to her hiatus.
^{D} Kris was absent due to lawsuit. Lu Han was absent due to health condition.
^{F} Members who participated on this leg were Hansol, Johnny, Taeyong, Yuta, Ten, Jaehyun, Yeri, Koeun, Mark, Jeno, Haechan, Hina, Jaemin, Jisung, Herin, Jeesu, and Winny.

Shanghai, China (October 18, 2014)

Performers

- Kangta
- BoA
- TVXQ
- Super Junior ^{[A]}
  - Super Junior-M
- Girls' Generation ^{[B]}
- SHINee
- f(x) ^{[C]}
- EXO ^{[D]}
- Zhang Liyin
- Red Velvet
- S ^{[E]}
- Tasty ^{[F]}
- SM Rookies^{[G]}

^{A} Yesung was absent due to his active military service.
^{B} Jessica was absent due to her recent departure from Girls' Generation. Sooyoung was absent due to the filming schedule of the drama My Spring Days.；
^{C} Sulli was absent due to her hiatus. Krystal felt sick after performing Red Light so she did not take part in Hope, the ending song of SM Town Live World Tour IV.
^{D} Kris and Lu Han were absent due to lawsuit.
^{E} S is a project group of S.M Entertainment. It was debuted in 2003. This regarded as their first live performance in their Korean comeback.
^{F} Tasty is a Chinese K-pop duo signed to Woollim Entertainment, and their participation was to mark their agency's integration to SM Entertainment's subsidiary, SM Culture and Contents.
^{G} Members who participated on this leg were Hansol, Johnny, Taeyong, Yuta, Ten, Jaehyun, Yeri, Koeun, Mark, Jeno, Haechan, Hina, Jaemin, Jisung, Herin, Jeesu, and Winny.

Hsinchu, Taiwan (March 21, 2015)

Performers

- Kangta
- BoA
- TVXQ
- Super Junior ^{[A]}
  - Super Junior-M
- Girls' Generation ^{[B]}
- SHINee
- f(x) ^{[C]}
- EXO ^{[D]}
- Zhang Liyin
- Red Velvet^{[E]}
- Tasty ^{[F]}
- SM Rookies^{[G]}

^{A} Yesung was absent due to his active military service. Shindong and Sungmin were absent due to their preparerations for military service.
^{B} Jessica was absent due to her departure from Girls' Generation in last year. Yoona was absent due to the filming schedule of Chinese drama《Chinese Hero Zhao Zi Long》.
^{C} Sulli was absent due to her hiatus.
^{D} Kris and Lu Han were absent due to lawsuit. Lay was absent due to the filming schedule of Chinese movie《從天而降》.
^{E} Red Velvet consisted of five members since Yeri was added to the group. Yeri previously performed with the female SM Rookie members in 2014.
^{F} Tasty is a Chinese K-pop duo signed to Woollim Entertainment, and their participation was to mark their agency's integration to SM Entertainment's subsidiary, SM Culture and Contents.
^{G} Members who participated on this leg were Hansol, Johnny, Taeyong, Yuta, Doyoung, Ten, Jaehyun, Koeun, Mark, Jeno, Haechan, Hina, Jaemin, Jisung, Herin, Jeesu, and Winny.

Tokyo, Japan (Special Edition) (July 5–6, 2015)

Performers

- Kangta
- BoA
- Shim Changmin^{[A]}
- TRAX
- Super Junior ^{[B]}
  - Super Junior-M
- Girls' Generation^{[C]}
- SHINee
- f(x)^{[D]}
- EXO^{[E]}
- Red Velvet ^{[F]}
- J-Min
- SM Rookies ^{G}

^{A} Yunho was absent due to his preparations for military service so Changmin represented TVXQ to participate the concert.
^{B} Shindong and Sungmin were absent due to their active military service.
^{C} Jessica was absent due to her departure from Girls' Generation in last year.
^{D} Victoria was absent due to health condition. Sulli was absent due to her hiatus.
^{E} Kris and Lu Han were absent due to lawsuit. Tao was absent due to his hiatus.
^{F} Red Velvet consisted of five members since Yeri was added to the group. Yeri previously performed with the female SM Rookie members in 2014.
^{G} Members who participated on this leg were Hansol, Johnny, Taeyong, Yuta, Doyoung, Ten, Jaehyun, Koeun, Mark, Jeno, Haechan, Hina, Jaemin, Jisung, Herin, Jeesu, and Winny.

Osaka, Japan (July 25–26, 2015)

Performers

- Kangta
- BoA
- Shim Changmin^{[A]}
- TRAX
- Super Junior ^{[B]}
  - Super Junior-M
- Girls' Generation^{[C]}
- SHINee^{[D]}
- f(x)^{[E]}
- EXO^{[F]}
- Red Velvet ^{[G]}
- J-Min
- SM Rookies ^{[G]}

^{A} Yunho was absent due to his active military service so Changmin represented TVXQ to participate the concert.
^{B} Shindong and Sungmin were absent due to their active military service.
^{C} Jessica was absent due to her departure from Girls' Generation in last year.
^{D} Minho was absent due to health condition.
^{E} Victoria was absent due to health condition. Sulli was absent due to her hiatus.
^{F} Kris and Lu Han were absent due to lawsuit. Tao was absent due to his hiatus.
^{G} Red Velvet consisted of five members since Yeri was added to the group. Yeri previously performed with the female SM Rookie members in 2014.
^{G} Members who participated on this leg were Hansol, Johnny, Taeyong, Yuta, Doyoung, Ten, Jaehyun, Koeun, Mark, Jeno, Haechan, Hina, Jaemin, Jisung, Herin, Jeesu, and Winny.

== SMTOWN Live Culture Humanity ==
SMTOWN Live Culture Humanity
- Online concert by SM Entertainment artists
- Start date: January 1, 2021
- No. of shows: 1
- Attendance: Approx. 35 .8 million

SMTOWN Live Culture Humanity is the worldwide live online concert organised by SMTOWN. The concert was held on January 1, 2021, and broadcast through Facebook, Twitter, V Live, YouTube, TikTok, Beyond Live and KNTV.

=== Performers ===
List of performers
- Aespa
- Baekhyun
- Ginjo
- IMLAY
- Kai
- Kangta
- NCT 127
- NCT Dream
- NCT U
- Raiden
- Red Velvet
- Super Junior
- SuperM
- Taemin
- Taeyeon
- TVXQ
- WayV

== SMTOWN Live 2022: SMCU Express ==
SMTOWN Live 2022: SMCU Express
- Concert by SM Entertainment artists
- Start date: January 1, 2022
- No. of shows: 5

=== Performers ===
Kwangya (Online concert) (January 1, 2022)

Performers

- Aespa
- BoA
- Ginjo
- Got the Beat
- Hitchhiker
- Hyoyeon (DJ Hyo)
- IMLAY
- J.E.B
- Kai
- Kangta
- Key
- Mar Vista
- Minho
- Minimonster
- NCT 127
- NCT Dream
- NCT U
- Onew
- Raiden
- Red Velvet
- Super Junior
- Taeyeon
- TVXQ
- WayV (Kun & Xiaojun)
Human City Suwon (August 20, 2022)

Performers

- Aespa
- BoA
- Chen
- D.O.
- Ginjo
- Girls' Generation
- Got the Beat
- IMLAY
- J.E.B
- Kai
- Kangta
- Key
- Minho
- NCT
- Raiden
- Red Velvet
- Suho
- Super Junior
- TVXQ
- Xiumin
Tokyo (August 27–29, 2022)

Performers

- Aespa
- BoA
- Chen
- Ginjo
- Hyoyeon
- Kai
- Kangta
- Key
- Minho
- NCT
- Onew
- Raiden
- Red Velvet
- Suho
- Super Junior
- Taeyeon
- TVXQ
- Xiumin
