= SM Town Live World Tour III =

2012–13 concert tour by SM Town

- World tour by SM Town
- Promotion poster for SM Town Live World Tour III in Los Angeles
- Location: Asia; North America
- Start date: 20 May 2012
- End date: 27 October 2013
- No. of shows: 10 in Asia; 1 in North America; 11 in total

SM Town concert chronology
- SM Town Live '10 World Tour (2010–11); SM Town Live World Tour III (2012–13); SM Town Week (2013)

SM Town Live World Tour III was the 2012–13 worldwide live concert tour by SM Town. The tour commenced with one show in Anaheim, California on May 20, 2012 and continued in Hsinchu, Tokyo, Seoul, Jakarta, Singapore and Bangkok.

== Background ==
SM Town is the name for the artists under Korean record label SM Entertainment. Each year the company organizes their artists to come together and perform on a four to six hours long concert that tours around the world. The concert takes approximately 96 hours to set up, with equipment coming from multiple countries across Asia & the US including South Korea, Taiwan, Japan, Indonesia, Thailand and Singapore. The show's total production value is estimated at US$5 million, with half being spent on pyrotechnics and staging alone.

== Concerts ==
The LA concert on 20 May 2012 was attended by Korean American actress Arden Cho, music producer Quincy Jones, who also attended the after party, and other music producers and composers, namely The Underdogs, who produced Beyoncé's "Listen" and Chris Brown's "Turn up the Music". It was played to an audience of 12,000.

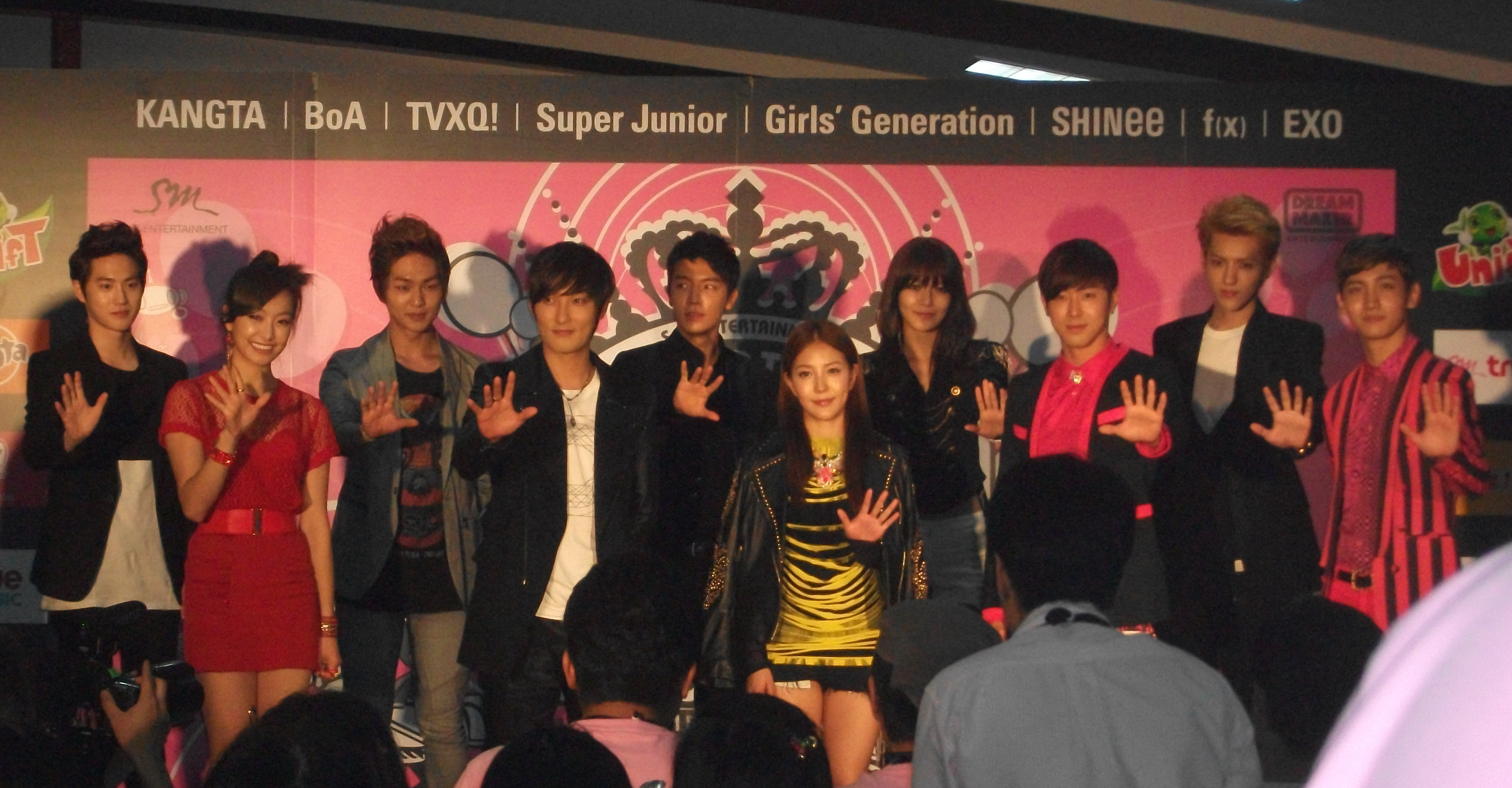
SM artists attending a press conference in Bangkok.

The concert in Taiwan was played to an audience of 30,000 and lasted for more than four hours with over 50 songs by BoA, Kangta, TVXQ, Super Junior, Girls' Generation, Shinee, f(x), Exo, Zhang Li Yin; and sub-groups Super Junior-M and Girls' Generation-TTS. The artists were greeted by over 1,000 fans when they flew into Taiwan Taoyuan International Airport on the Friday prior to the concert. The two concerts held at the Tokyo Dome in August attracted an audience of over 100,000 people and the demand outstrip supply by six-to-one. The Tokyo Dome dates will be broadcast in Japan via Fuji TV.

The concert at the Gelora Bung Karno Stadium in Jakarta, Indonesia attracted over 50,000 people, becoming the largest concert ever to be played at the stadium. The artists were greeted by over 3,500 fans when they arrived in Soekarno-Hatta International Airport on 21 September 2012, one day before the concert. Super Junior leader Leeteuk was unable to perform during the concert due to exhaustion and enteritis, for which he made an apology the following day via his Twitter account. Sulli of f(x) and Minho of SHINee were not at the Seoul Concert as they were filming for their drama, "To the Beautiful You".

== Reception ==
John Seabrook, a journalist from The New Yorker who attended the concert in Anaheim, California, wrote: "Occasionally, the concert seemed like a giant pep rally. But at its best it elicited primal pop emotions that only a few of the greatest pop artists—the Beach Boys, the early Beatles, Phil Spector’s girl groups—can evoke: the feeling of pure love."

== Performers ==
Anaheim, USA (May 20, 2012)

Performers

- BoA
- TVXQ
- f(x)
- Super Junior^{[A]}
- SHINee
- Girls' Generation^{[B]}
- EXO

^{A} Siwon was absent due to his filming schedule of the Chinese drama Zhuan Shen Shuo Ai Ni while Heechul was absent due to his active military service.
^{B} Yoona and Yuri were both absent due to their filming schedules of the dramas Love Rain and Fashion King respectively.

Hsinchu, Taiwan (June 9, 2012)

Performers

- BoA
- TVXQ
- f(x)
- Super Junior^{[A]}
- Super Junior-M
- Zhang Liyin
- SHINee
- Girls' Generation
- EXO

^{A} Siwon was absent due to his filming schedule of the Chinese drama Zhuan Shen Shuo Ai Ni while Heechul was absent due to his active military service.

Tokyo, Japan (August 4/5, 2012)

Performers

- Kangta
- BoA
- TVXQ
- The Grace - Dana & Sunday
- Super Junior^{[A]}
- Super Junior-M
- f(x)^{[B]}
- J-Min
- SHINee^{[B]}
- Girls' Generation
- EXO^{[C]}

^{A} Heechul was absent due to his active military service.
^{B} Minho and Sulli were both absent due to the filming schedule of their drama To the Beautiful You.
^{C} Because of Minho's absence from SHINee, EXO-M's Luhan filled in for him as a guest dancer during SHINee's performance of "Lucifer" while EXO-K's Sehun filled in during SHINee's performance of "Love Like Oxygen".

Seoul, South Korea (August 18, 2012)

Performers

- Kangta
- BoA
- TVXQ
- The Grace - Dana & Sunday
- Super Junior^{[A]}
- Super Junior-M
- Zhang Liyin
- Chu Ga Yeol
- f(x)^{[B]}
- SHINee^{[B]}
- Girls' Generation
- EXO^{[C]}

^{A} Heechul was absent due to his active military service.
^{B} Minho and Sulli were both absent due to the filming schedule of their drama To the Beautiful You.
^{C} Because of Minho's absence from SHINee, EXO-M's Luhan filled in for him as a guest dancer during SHINee's performance of "Lucifer" while EXO-K's Sehun filled in during SHINee's performance of "Love Like Oxygen".

Jakarta, Indonesia (September 22, 2012)

Performers

- Kangta
- BoA
- TVXQ
- Super Junior^{[A]} ^{[B]}
- Super Junior-M
- f(x)^{[D]}
- SHINee^{[D]}
- Girls' Generation^{[C]}
- EXO^{[E]}

^{A} Heechul was absent due to his active military service.
^{B} Leeteuk suffered a stomach ache during the concert and did not take part the rest performances of the show.
^{C} Sunny did not take part in the ending song "Hope".
^{D} Minho and Sulli were both absent due to the filming schedule of their drama To the Beautiful You.
^{E} Because of Minho's absence from SHINee, EXO-M's Luhan filled in for him as a guest dancer during SHINee's performance of "Lucifer" while EXO-K's Sehun filled in during SHINee's performance of "Love Like Oxygen".

Singapore (November 23, 2012)

Performers

- Kangta
- BoA
- TVXQ
- Super Junior^{[A]} ^{[B]} ^{[C]}
- Super Junior-M
- f(x)
- SHINee
- Girls' Generation
- EXO

^{A} Heechul was absent due to his active military service.
^{B} Leeteuk was absent due to illness.
^{C} Siwon was absent due to his filming schedule of the drama The King of Dramas.

Bangkok, Thailand (November 25, 2012)

Performers

- Kangta
- BoA
- TVXQ
- Super Junior^{[A]} ^{[B]} ^{[C]}
- Super Junior-M
- f(x)
- SHINee
- Girls' Generation
- EXO

^{A} Heechul was absent due to his active military service.
^{B} Leeteuk was absent due to illness.
^{C} Siwon was absent due to his filming schedule of the drama The King of Dramas.

Beijing, China (October 19, 2013)

Performers

- Kangta
- BoA
- TVXQ
- Super Junior ^{[A]} ^{[B]} ^{[C]}
- Super Junior-M
- f(x) ^{[E]}
- SHINee ^{[D]}
- Girls' Generation
- EXO
- Zhang Liyin
- TASTY

^{A} Leeteuk was absent due to illness.
^{B} Yesung was absent due to his active military service.
^{C} Siwon was absent due to the filming of his Chinese movie Helios.
^{D} Minho was absent due to the filming of his drama Medical Top Team.
^{E} Krystal was absent due to the filming of her drama The Heirs.

Tokyo, Japan (October 26/27, 2013)

Performers

- Kangta
- BoA
- TVXQ
- The Grace-Dana & Sunday
- Super Junior ^{[A]} ^{[B]} ^{[C]}
- Super Junior-M
- f(x) ^{[E]}
- J-Min
- SHINee ^{[D]}
- Girls' Generation
- EXO

^{A} Leeteuk was absent due to illness.
^{B} Yesung was absent due to his active military service.
^{C} Siwon was absent due to the filming of his Chinese movie Helios.
^{D} Minho was absent due to the filming of his drama Medical Top Team.
^{E} Krystal was absent due to the filming of her drama The Heirs

== Set list ==
Anaheim, USA (May 20, 2012)

Performers

1. "Lucifer" (SHINee)
2. "A.Mi.Go" (SHINee)
3. "Juliette" (SHINee)
4. "Superman" (Super Junior)
5. "Don't Don" (Super Junior)
6. "The Way You Are" + "Mirotic" (TVXQ)
7. "Bonamana" (Super Junior)
8. "Hot Summer" (f(x))
9. "Nu ABO" (f(x))
10. "Devil's Cry" (Taeyeon)
11. "Run Devil Run" (Girls' Generation)
12. "Tell Me Your Wish (Genie)" (Girls' Generation)
13. "Kissing You" (Girls' Generation)
14. "The SHINee World" (SHINee)
15. "Love Like Oxygen" (SHINee)
16. "Oops!" (Leeteuk, Donghae, Eunhyuk, Shindong, Krystal, Amber, Victoira, and Sulli)
17. "Can I Have This Dance" (Onew and Luna)
18. "California Gurls" (Jessica and Krystal)
19. "Just the Way You Are" (Changmin and Kyuhyun)
20. "Oppa, Oppa" (Donghae & Eunhyuk)
21. "History" (EXO)
22. "MAMA" (EXO)
23. "Twinkle" (Girls' Generation-TTS)
24. "Like a G6" (Key, Amber and Kris)
25. "Sorry Sorry" (Super Junior)
26. "A-Cha" (Super Junior)
27. "Maximum" (TVXQ)
28. "Keep Your Head Down" (TVXQ)
29. "Look Who's Talking" (BoA)
30. "Energetic" (BoA)
31. "One Dream" (Key and Kris)
32. "I Did It for Love" (BoA and Key)
33. "Hurricane Venus" (BoA)
34. "Way to Go! (Himnae)" (Girls' Generation)
35. "Gee" (Girls' Generation)
36. "Dancing Out" (Super Junior)
37. "Ring Ding Dong" (SHINee)
38. "Pinocchio (Danger)" (f(x))
39. "Sherlock" (SHINee)
40. "The Boys (English version)" (Girls' Generation)
41. "Mr. Simple" (Super Junior)
42. "Rising Sun" (TVXQ)
43. "Hope" (SM Town)
Hsinchu, Taiwan (June 9, 2012)

Performers

1. "The Left Shore of Happiness" (Zhang Liyin)
2. "Moving On" (Zhang Liyin)
3. "Hot Summer" (f(x))
4. "Nu ABO" (f(x))
5. "Remember" (Kangta)
6. "Breaka Shaka" (Kangta)
7. "Marry Me Today" (Zhou Mi and Victoria)
8. "California Gurls" (Jessica and Krystal)
9. "Just the Way You Are" (Changmin and Kyuhyun)
10. "Oppa, Oppa" (Donghae & Eunhyuk)
11. "History" (EXO)
12. "MAMA" (EXO)
13. "Devil's Cry" (Taeyeon)
14. "Run Devil Run" (Girls' Generation)
15. "Tell Me Your Wish (Genie)" (Girls' Generation)
16. "Kissing You" (Girls' Generation)
17. "Oops!" (Leeteuk, Donghae, Eunhyuk, Shindong and f(x))
18. "Lucifer" (SHINee)
19. "A.Mi.Go" (SHINee)
20. "Juliette" (SHINee)
21. "Superman" (Super Junior)
22. "Don't Don" (Super Junior)
23. "The Way You Are" + "Mirotic" (TVXQ)
24. "Bonamana" (Super Junior)
25. "The SHINee World" (SHINee)
26. "Love Like Oxygen" (SHINee)
27. "Twinkle" (Girls' Generation-TTS)
28. "DJ Got Us Fallin' in Love" (Girls’ Generation-TTS and D.O, Luhan, Sehun, Chanyeol)
29. "Love Doesn’t Travel Alone" (Ryeowook, Eunhyuk, and Chen)
30. "Like a G6" (Key, Amber, and Kris)
31. "Sorry Sorry" (Super Junior)
32. "Perfection (Chinese version)" (Super Junior-M)
33. "A-Cha" (Super Junior)
34. "Maximum" (TVXQ)
35. "Keep Your Head Down" (TVXQ)
36. "Look Who's Talking" (BoA)
37. "Energetic" (BoA)
38. "One Dream" (BoA, Key and Kris)
39. "I Did It for Love" (BoA and Key)
40. "Hurricane Venus" (BoA)
41. "Way to Go!" (Girls' Generation)
42. "Gee" (Girls' Generation)
43. "Dancing Out" (Super Junior)
44. "Ring Ding Dong" (SHINee)
45. "Pinocchio (Danger)" (f(x))
46. "Sherlock" (SHINee)
47. "The Boys" (Girls' Generation)
48. "Mr. Simple" (Super Junior)
49. "Rising Sun" (TVXQ)
50. "Hope" (SM Town)
Tokyo, Japan (August 4, 2012)

Performers

1. "Stand Up To the Beautiful You OST" (J-Min)
2. "One" (J-Min)
3. "One More Chance" (The Grace - Dana & Sunday)
4. "Pinochhio" (f(x))
5. "Hot Summer (Japanese Ver.)" (f(x))
6. "Remember" (Kangta)
7. "Breaka, Shaka" (Kangta)
8. "Like a G6" (Key, Amber, Kris)
9. "Just the way you are" (Changmin, Kyuhyun)
10. "Oppa Oppa" (Donghae, Eunhyuk)
11. "History" (EXO)
12. "MAMA" (EXO)
13. "Devil's Cry" (Taeyeon)
14. "Run Devil Run" (Girls' Generation)
15. "Tell Me Your Wish (Genie) (Japanese Ver.)" (Girls' Generation)
16. "The Boys (Japanese Ver.)" (Girls' Generation)
17. "Oops!" (Super Junior and f(x))
18. "Lucifer (Japanese Ver.)" (SHINee feat. Luhan (as special guest dancer))
19. "Superman" (Super Junior)
20. "Opera" (Super Junior)
21. "Mirotic (Japanese Ver.) (TVXQ)
22. "BONAMANA" (Super Junior)
23. "Rising Sun" (TVXQ)
24. "Juliette (Japanese Ver.)" (SHINee)
25. "Love Like Oxygen (Japanese Ver.)" (SHINee feat. Sehun (as special guest dancer))
26. "Love Doesn’t Travel Alone" (Chen, Ryeowook, Eunhyuk)
27. "Twinkle" (Girls' Generation-TTS)
28. "DJ Got Us Fallin' in Love" (Girls' Generation-TTS + D.O, Luhan, Sehun, Chanyeol)
29. "Sorry Sorry" (Super Junior)
30. "Perfection (Japanese Ver.)" (Super Junior-M)
31. "Mr. Simple (Japanese Ver.)" (Super Junior)
32. "Mr. Taxi" (Girls' Generation)
33. "Android" (TVXQ)
34. "BUT (Be-AU-TY)" (TVXQ)
35. "Keep Your Head Down" (TVXQ)
36. "Lose You Mind" (BoA)
37. "Hurricane Venus" (BoA)
38. "The Shadow" (BoA)
39. "Only One" (BoA feat Eunhyuk)
40. "Gee" (Girls Generation)
41. "Kissing You" (Girls Generation)
42. "Ring Ding Dong" (SHINee)
43. "Dancing Out" (Super Junior)
44. "Summer Dream" (TVXQ)
45. "Sky" (TVXQ)
46. "Electric Shock" (f(x))
47. "Sherlock (Japanese Ver.)" (SHINee)
48. "Paparazzi" (Girls' Generation)
49. "Sexy, Free and Single (Japanese Ver.)" (Super Junior)
50. "Somebody to Love" (TVXQ)
51. "Hope" (SMTOWN)
Tokyo, Japan (August 5, 2012)

Performers

1. Stand Up To the Beautiful You OST - J-Min
2. One - J-Min
3. One More Chance - The Grace - Dana & Sunday
4. Pinocchio (Danger) - f(x)
5. Hot Summer (Japanese Ver.) - f(x)
6. Remember - Kangta
7. Breaka, Shaka - Kangta
8. Like a G6 - Key, Amber, Kris
9. California Gurls - Jessica, Krystal
10. Just the way you are - Changmin, Kyuhyun
11. Oppa Oppa - Donghae, Eunhyuk
12. History - EXO
13. MAMA - EXO
14. Devil's Cry - Taeyeon
15. Run Devil Run - Girls' Generation
16. Tell Me Your Wish (Genie) (Japanese Ver.) - Girls' Generation
17. The Boys (Japanese Ver.) - Girls' Generation
18. Oops! - Super Junior + f(x)
19. Lucifer (Japanese Ver.) - SHINee feat. Luhan (as special guest dancer)
20. Superman - Super Junior
21. Opera - Super Junior
22. Mirotic (Japanese Ver.) - TVXQ
23. BONAMANA - Super Junior
24. Rising Sun - TVXQ!
25. Juliette (Japanese Ver.) - SHINee
26. Love Like Oxygen (Japanese Ver.) - SHINee feat. Sehun (as special guest dancer)
27. Love Doesn’t Travel Alone - Chen, Ryeowook, Eunhyuk
28. Twinkle - Girls' Generation-TTS
29. DJ Got Us Fallin' in Love - Girls' Generation-TTS + EXO's D.O, Lu Han, Sehun, Chanyeol
30. Sorry Sorry - Super Junior
31. Perfection (Japanese Ver.) - Super Junior-M
32. Mr. Simple (Japanese Ver.) - Super Junior
33. Mr. Taxi - Girls' Generation
34. Android - TVXQ!
35. BUT (Be-AU-TY) - TVXQ!
36. Keep Your Head Down - TVXQ!
37. Lose You Mind - BoA
38. Hurricane Venus - BoA
39. The Shadow - BoA
40. Only One - BoA feat Eunhyuk
41. Gee - Girls Generation
42. Kissing You - Girls Generation
43. Ring Ding Dong - SHINee
44. Dancing Out - Super Junior
45. Summer Dream - TVXQ!
46. Sky - TVXQ!
47. Electric Shock - f(x)
48. Sherlock (Japanese Ver.) - SHINee
49. Paparazzi - Girls' Generation
50. Sexy, Free and Single (Japanese Ver.) - Super Junior
51. Somebody to Love - TVXQ!
52. Hope - SMTOWN
Seoul, South Korea (August 18, 2012)

Performers

1. Dear My Family - BoA, TVXQ, Yesung, Taeyeon, Jonghyun, Luna, D.O, Baekhyun, Chen, and Luhan
2. My Everything - The Grace - Dana & Sunday
3. Stand Up - J-Min
4. Vincent - Chu Ga Yeol
5. Pinocchio (Danger) - f(x)
6. Hot Summer - f(x)
7. performed - Kim Min Jong
8. Remember - Kangta
9. Breaka, Shaka - Kangta
10. Like A G6 - Key, Kris & Amber
11. California Gurls - Jessica & Krystal
12. Just The Way You Are - Changmin & Kyuhyun with a special appearance by Taemin
13. Oppa Oppa - Super Junior: Donghae & Eunhyuk
14. History - EXO
15. MAMA - EXO
16. Devil's Cry - Taeyeon
17. Run Devil Run - Girls' Generation
18. Tell Me Your Wish (Genie) - Girls' Generation
19. Oops! - Super Junior & f(x)
20. Lucifer - SHINee feat. Luhan (as special guest dancer)
21. Superman - Super Junior
22. Don't Don - Super Junior
23. Ring Ding Dong (Remix Ver.) - SHINee
24. Bonamana - Super Junior
25. Juliette - SHINee
26. Love Like Oxygen - SHINee feat. Sehun (as special guest dancer)
27. Missing You - Ryeowook & D.O.
28. Twinkle - Girls' Generation-TTS
29. DJ Got Us Fallin' in Love - Girls' Generation-TTS, D.O., Luhan, Sehun, and Chanyeol

Dance Battle

-Part 1(f(Victoria) with EXO-M's Tao for special appearance) -Part 2 - MaxStep(Short Version)(Younique Unit) -Part 3(Girl's Generation) -Part 4- 正.反.合.(Instrumental Version)(TVXQ's Yunho, SHNIee's Taemin, Girl's Generation, EXO's Kai & Tao)

1. Hurricane Venus - BoA
2. Not Over U - BoA
3. The Shadow - BoA
4. Sorry Sorry - Super Junior
5. Perfection (Korean ver.) - Super Junior-M
6. A-CHa - Super Junior
7. Mr. Taxi (Korean ver.) - Girls' Generation
8. Internet War - Jonghyun & Taemin
9. Maximum - TVXQ!
10. Mirotic - TVXQ!
11. Keep Your Head Down - TVXQ!
12. Gee - Girls' Generation
13. Kissing You - Girls' Generation
14. Dancing Out - Super Junior
15. Only One - BoA feat. Taemin
16. Electric Shock - f(x)
17. Sherlock - SHINee
18. The Boys - Girls' Generation
19. Sexy, Free & Single - Super Junior
20. Rising Sun - TVXQ!
21. Hope - SMTOWN
Jakarta, Indonesia (September 22, 2012)

Performers

1. Hot Summer - f(x)
2. Pinocchio (Danger) - f(x)
3. Remember - Kangta
4. Breaka Shaka - Kangta
5. Like A G6 - Key of SHINee, Kris of EXO-M & Amber of f(x)
6. California Gurls - Jessica & Krystal
7. Just The Way You Are - Changmin & Kyuhyun
8. Oppa, Oppa - Eunhyuk & Donghae
9. History - EXO
10. MAMA - EXO
11. Devil's Cry - Taeyeon
12. Run Devil Run - Girls' Generation
13. Tell Me Your Wish (Genie) - Girls' Generation
14. Oops! - Super Junior & f(x)
15. Lucifer - SHINee feat. Lu Han of EXO-M (as special guest dancer)
16. Superman - Super Junior
17. Don't Don - Super Junior
18. Ring Ding Dong - SHINee
19. Bonamana - Super Junior
20. Juliette - SHINee
21. Love Like Oxygen - SHINee feat. Sehun of EXO-K (as special guest dancer)
22. Missing You - Ryeowook & Chen of EXO-M
23. Twinkle - Girls' Generation-TTS
24. DJ Got Us Fallin' in Love - Girls' Generation-TTS, D.O., Lu Han, Sehun, Chanyeol

Dance Battle

-Part 1(f(Victoria) with EXO-M's Tao for special appearance)
-Part 2 - MaxStep(Short Version)(Younique Unit)
-Part 3(Girl's Generation)
-Part 4- 正.反.合.(Instrumental Version)(TVXQ's Yunho, SHNIee's Taemin, Girl's Generation, EXO's Kai & Tao)

1. VCR (SMTOWN Family Love)
2. Hurricane Venus - BoA
3. Not Over You - BoA
4. The Shadow - BoA
5. Sorry Sorry - Super Junior
6. Perfection (Korean ver.) - Super Junior-M
7. A-Cha - Super Junior (without Leeteuk)
8. Mr. Taxi / Run Devil Run - Girls' Generation
9. Internet War - Jonghyun & Taemin
10. Maximum - TVXQ!
11. Mirotic - TVXQ!
12. Keep You Head Down - TVXQ!
13. Gee - Girls' Generation
14. Kissing You - Girls' Generation
15. Dancing Out - Super Junior (without Leeteuk)
16. Only One- BoA feat. SHINee's Taemin
17. Electric Shock - f(x)
18. Sherlock - SHINee
19. The Boys - Girls' Generation
20. Sexy, Free & Single - Super Junior (without Leeteuk)
21. Rising Sun - TVXQ
Singapore (November 23, 2012)

Performers

1. Hot Summer - f(x)

Ment
f(x)

1. Pinoccio (Danger) - f(x)
2. Pine Tree + Polaris - Kangta
3. 愛頻率(Breaka Shaka) - Kangta
4. Marry Me Today - Super junior-M's Zhou Mi & f(Victoria)
5. California Gurls - Jung's Sisters(Jessica & Krystal)
6. Just The Way You Are - TVXQ's Changmin & Super Junior's Kyuhyun
7. Oppa Oppa - Super Junior-Donghae & Eunhyuk
8. History - EXO

Ment
EXO

1. MAMA - EXO
2. Devil's Cry - Kim Taeyeon
3. Run Devil Run - Girls' Generation
4. Tell Me Your Wish (Genie) - Girls' Generation
5. Lucifer (remix) - SHINee
6. Superman - Super Junior
7. Don't Don - Super Junior
8. Purple Line - TVXQ!
9. Ring Ding Dong - SHINee
10. Bonamana - Super Junior
11. Rising Sun - TVXQ!
12. Juliette - SHINee
13. Love Like Oxygen - SHINee
14. Jet - f(x)
15. Open Arms - Super Junior's Ryeowook, SHINee's Onew, EXO's Chen & Baekhyun
16. Twinkle - Girls' Generation-TTS
17. DJ Got Us Fallin' in Love - Girls' Generation-TTS, EXO's D.O, Lu Han, Sehun & Chanyeol
18. Like a G6 - SHINee's Key, EXO-M's Kris & f(Amber)

Dance Battle

-Part 1(f(Victoria) with EXO-M's Tao for special appearance)
-Part 2 - MaxStep(Short Version)(Younique Unit)
-Part 3(Girl's Generation)
-Part 4- 正.反.合.(Instrumental Version)(TVXQ's Yunho, SHNIee's  Taemin, Girl's Generation, EXO's Kai & Tao)

1. VCR(SMTOWN Family Love)
2. Hurricane Venus - BoA
3. My Name - BoA
4. No. 1 - BoA
5. Sorry Sorry - Super Junior
6. Perfection 太完美 - Super Junior-M

Ment
Super Junior & Super Junior-M

1. A-Cha - Super Junior
2. Mr. Taxi - Girls' Generation
3. Internet War -SHINee's Jonghyun & Lee Taemin
4. O-正.反.合. - TVXQ!
5. Mirotic - TVXQ!
6. Humanoids - TVXQ!
7. Why (Keep Your Head Down) - TVXQ!
8. Gee - Girls' Generation
9. Kissing You - Girls' Generation
10. Dancing Out - Super Junior
11. Only One - BoA feat. Sehun
12. Electric Shock - f(x)
13. Sherlock - SHINee
14. The Boys - Girls' Generation
15. Sexy, Free & Single - Super Junior
16. Catch Me - TVXQ!
17. Hope - SMTOWN
Bangkok, Thailand (November 25, 2012)

Performers

1. Hot Summer - f(x)
2. Pinocchio (Danger) - f(x)
3. Pine Tree + Polaris - Kangta
4. 愛頻率 - Kangta
5. Marry Me Today - Super junior-M's Zhou Mi & f(Victoria)
6. California Gurls - Jessica & Krystal
7. Just The Way You Are - Changmin & Kyuhyun
8. Oppa Oppa - Eunhyuk & Donghae
9. History - EXO
10. MAMA - EXO
11. Devil's Cry - Taeyeon
12. Run Devil Run - Girls' Generation
13. Tell Me Your Wish (Genie) - Girls' Generation
14. Lucifer (remix) - SHINee
15. Superman - Super Junior
16. Don't Don - Super Junior
17. Purple Line - TVXQ!
18. Ring Ding Dong - SHINee
19. Bonamana - Super Junior
20. Rising Sun - TVXQ!
21. Juliette - SHINee
22. Love Like Oxygen - SHINee
23. Jet - f(x)
24. Open Arms - Ryeowook, Onew, Chen & Baekhyun
25. Twinkle - Girls' Generation-TTS
26. DJ Got Us Fallin' in Love - Girls' Generation-TTS, D.O, Luhan, Sehun & Chanyeol
27. Like a G6 - SHINee's Key, EXO-M's Kris & f(Amber)

Dance Battle

-Part 1(f(Victoria) with EXO-M's Tao for special appearance)
-Part 2 - MaxStep(Short Version)(Younique Unit)
-Part 3(Girl's Generation)
-Part 4- 正.反.合.(Instrumental Version)(TVXQ's Yunho, SHNIee's Taemin, Girl's Generation, EXO's Kai & Tao)

VCR(SMTOWN Family Love)

1. Hurricane Venus - BoA
2. My Name - BoA
3. No. 1 - BoA
4. Sorry Sorry - Super Junior
5. Perfection 太完美 - Super Junior-M
6. A-Cha - Super Junior
7. Mr. Taxi - Girls' Generation
8. Internet War - SHINee's Jonghyun & Taemin
9. O-正.反.合. - TVXQ!
10. Mirotic - TVXQ!
11. Humanoids - TVXQ!
12. Why (Keep Your Head Down) - TVXQ!
13. Gee - Girls' Generation

Ment
Girl's Generation

1. Kissing You - Girls' Generation
2. Dancing Out - Super Junior
3. Only One - BoA feat. Taemin
4. Electric Shock - f(x)
5. Sherlock - SHINee
6. The Boys - Girls' Generation
7. Sexy, Free & Single - Super Junior
8. Catch Me - TVXQ!
9. Hope - SMTOWN
Beijing, China (October 19, 2013)

Performers

1. "MaMaMa" - TASTY
2. "You Know Me" - TASTY
3. "Y (Why...)" - Zhang Liyin

Ment
Zhang Liyin

1. "Moving On" - Zhang Liyin
2. "Pinocchio (Danger)" - f(x)

Ment
f(x)

1. "Electric Shock" - f(x)
2. "Remember" - Kangta

Ment
Kangta

1. "Breaka Shaka" - Kangta
2. "Summer Breezing" - Super Junior-M's Zhou Mi, f(Victoria)
3. "Just the Way You Are" - TVXQ's Changmin & Super Junior's Kyuhyun
4. "Oppa, Oppa" - Super Junior-Donghae & Eunhyuk
5. "History" - EXO

Ment
EXO

1. "Wolf" - EXO
2. "Devil's Cry" - Taeyeon
3. "Run Devil Run" - Girls' Generation
4. "Tell Me Your Wish (Genie)" - Girls' Generation
5. "Lucifer (remix)" - SHINee
6. "Superman" - Super Junior
7. "MAMA" - EXO
8. "Purple Line" - TVXQ!
9. "Ring Ding Dong" - SHINee
10. "Bonamana" - Super Junior
11. "Rising Sun" - TVXQ!
12. "Dream Girl" - SHINee
13. "Love Like Oxygen" - SHINee
14. "Twinkle" - Girls' Generation-TTS
15. "Sunday Morning" - Ryeowook, D.O. & Chen
16. "Like a G6" - Key, Amber & Kris

Dance Battle

- Part 1(f(Victoria) with EXO-M's Tao for special appearance) - Part 2 - MaxStep(Short Version)(Younique Unit) - Part 3(Girl's Generation) - Part 4- 正.反.合.(Instrumental Version)(TVXQ's Yunho, SHNIee's Taemin, Girl's Generation, EXO's Kai & Tao)

1. "Hurricane Venus - BoA
2. "My Name" - BoA
3. "No. 1" - BoA
4. "Sorry Sorry" - Super Junior

Ment
Super Junior & Super Junior-M

1. "Break Down" - Super Junior-M
2. "Sherlock" - SHINee
3. "O-正.反.合." - TVXQ!
4. "Mirotic" - TVXQ!
5. "Why (Keep Your Head Down) - TVXQ!
6. "Gee" - Girls' Generation

Ment
Girl's Generation

1. "Kissing You" - Girls' Generation
2. "Dancing Out" / "Rockstar" - Super Junior
3. "Only One" - BoA feat. Luhan
4. "Rum Pum Pum Pum" - f(x)
5. "Growl" - EXO
6. "Everybody" - SHINee
7. "I Got a Boy" - Girls' Generation
8. "Sexy, Free & Single" - Super Junior
9. "Catch Me" - TVXQ!
10. "Hope" - SMTOWN
Tokyo, Japan (October 26/27, 2013)

Performers

1. One - J-Min
2. Heart Station - J-Min
3. My Everything(Japanese Ver.)- The Grace-Dana & Sunday
4. One More Chance - The Grace-Dana & Sunday
5. Almost is Never Enough - Girls' Generation's Tiffany & Super Junior-M's Henry
6. Pinocchio (Danger) - f(x)
7. Electric Shock - f(x)
8. Pine Tree / Polaris - Kangta
9. Breaka Shaka - Kangta
10. Sunday Morning - Ryeowook, D.O., Chen
11. Ichigo (Strawberry) - Changmin, Kyuhyun
12. Oppa Oppa - Donghae, Eunhyuk
13. History - EXO
14. Wolf - EXO
15. Flower Power - Girls' Generation

Ment
Girl's Generation

1. Galaxy Supernova - Girls' Generation
2. Love & Girls - Girls' Generation
3. Lucifer (Japanese Ver.) - SHINee (feat. Lu Han as special guest dancer
4. Superman - Super Junior
5. MAMA - EXO
6. Mirotic (Japanese Ver.) - TVXQ
7. Ring Ding Dong - SHINee
8. BONAMANA (Japanese Ver.) - Super Junior
9. Rising Sun - TVXQ!
10. Stand By Me (Japanese Ver.) - SHINee
11. Boys Meet U - SHINee
12. Beautiful - Super Junior's Kyuhyun, Girls' Generation's Seohyun
13. Trap - Henry feat. Amber
14. Like a G6 - SHINee's Key, EXO-M's Kris, f(Amber)
15. Twinkle - Girls' Generation-TTS
16. Dance Battle

-Part 1 (TVXQ's Yunho, Super Junior-Donghae & Eunhyuk, Girl's Generation's Hyoyeon, SHINee's Taemin, EXO's Kai & Lay) -Part 2-Spectrum (S.M The Performance)

1. Hurricane Venus - BoA
2. Message - BoA
3. Bump Bump - BoA
4. Sorry Sorry - Super Junior
5. Break Down - Super Junior-M
6. Paparazzi - Girls' Generation
7. Internet War - (SHINee's Jonghyun & Taemin feat. J-Min)
8. Mirotic (Japanese Ver.) - TVXQ!
9. Purple Line - TVXQ!
10. Keep Your Head Down (Japanese Ver.) - TVXQ!
11. Gee (Japanese Ver.) - Girls Generation
12. Kissing You - Girls Generation
13. Ready or Not - SHINee
14. Dancing Out / Rockstar - Super Junior
15. We Are - TVXQ!
16. Ocean - TVXQ
17. Only One (Japanese Ver.) - BoA feat. Sehun as special guest dancer)
18. Rum Pum Pum Pum - f(x)
19. Growl - EXO
20. Everybody - SHINee
21. I Got a Boy - Girls' Generation
22. Sexy, Free and Single (Japanese Ver.) - Super Junior
23. Somebody to Love - TVXQ!
24. Hope - SMTOWN

== Tour dates ==
Date	City	Country	Venue	Attendance
North America
May 20, 2012	Anaheim^{[A]}	United States	Honda Center	12,000
Asia
June 9, 2012	Zhubei^{[B]}	Taiwan	Hsinchu County Stadium	30,000
August 4, 2012	Tokyo	Japan	Tokyo Dome	100,000
August 5, 2012	Tokyo	Japan	Tokyo Dome	100,000
August 18, 2012	Seoul	South Korea	Seoul Olympic Stadium	40,000
September 22, 2012	Jakarta	Indonesia	Gelora Bung Karno Stadium	50,000
November 23, 2012	Singapore		The Float@Marina Bay	26,000
November 25, 2012	Bangkok	Thailand	SCG Stadium	23,000
October 19, 2013	Beijing	China	Beijing National Stadium	70,000
October 26, 2013	Tokyo^{[C]}	Japan	Tokyo Dome	100,000
October 27, 2013	Tokyo^{[C]}	Japan	Tokyo Dome	100,000
TOTAL				451,000

^{A} The concert was advertised as SMTOWN Live World Tour III in Los Angeles.
^{B} The concert was advertised as SMTOWN Live World Tour III in Taipei.
^{C} These concerts were advertised as SMTOWN Live World Tour III in Tokyo Special Edition.
