= Kangta & Best =

Greatest hits album by Kangta
- Released: October 3, 2006
- Genre: K-pop, R&B
- Language: Korean
- Label: SM Entertainment
- Producer: Lee Soo Man

Kangta chronology
Persona (2005)	Kangta & Best (2006)	Eternity (2008)

Kangta & Best is a greatest hits album released in 2006 by Kangta. The album is compiled from his first three solo albums and songs from the group S.

== Track listing ==
Disc 1 - CD

1. Polaris
2. Falling In Love
3. Pine Tree
4. Paralysis
5. Thanks God
6. Memories
7. Reminiscence #1
8. The Best
9. Illusion
10. One Snowing Day
11. My Life
12. Persona
13. Happy Happy
14. Memories #2
15. 1 Rainy Day

Disc 2 - DVD Region 2

1. Polaris
2. Thanks God
3. Memories
4. Propose
5. Confession
6. Persona
7. I Swear (Group S)
8. I Was... (Group S)
9. Love Is... (Group S])
10. Special Interview
