= Persona (Kangta album) =

Studio album by Kangta
- Released: March 4, 2005
- Genres: Pop; R&B; soul; jazz; rock
- Language: Korean
- Label: S.M. Entertainment
- Producers: Ahn Chil-hyun; Lee Soo-man (exec.)

Kangta chronology
1st Concert Pinetree: 20020824 Live (2003)	Persona (2005)	Scandal (2006)

Persona (Korean: 가면; RR: Gamyeon; lit. 'mask'; stylized as pɘrsona) is the third studio album by South Korean singer-songwriter Kangta. It was first released in South Korea on March 4, 2005, under S.M. Entertainment. Directed by Lee Sang-kyu, the music video for his title song "Persona" was shot in San Francisco.

== Artwork ==
There are several different versions of the album cover. It is very likely that most of them (if not, all) were taken at a Chinese studio by photographer Kim Joong-nam, who previously worked on the cover for Polaris. They all feature Kangta baring his muscular trunk while wearing white hooded attire, a silver rope necklace, and gloves. In the original version, a temporary tattoo is visible on his upper left arm. He also wore a hat for the alternate version depicted above.

== Accolades ==
The title track "Persona" was nominated for the Best R&B Performance and Overseas Viewers' award at the seventh Mnet Km Music Video Festival. He lost the former to Wheesung's "Goodbye Luv" and won the latter. He also won the Overseas Artist Award at the third South-East Music Ceremony in Fujian, China.

== Track listing ==
Korean version, most widely available for streaming
No.	Title	Lyrics	Music	Arrangement	Length
1.	"Persona" (가면)	Kangta	Kangta	Kangta	3:47
2.	"Illusion" (쓰레기)	Kangta	Kangta	Kangta	4:31
3.	"Agape" (느리게 걷기)	Kangta	Kangta	Kangta	5:03
4.	"Paralysis" (마비)	Kangta	Kangta	Kangta	3:16
5.	"Just One Day" (하루만큼만)	Kangta	Kangta	Kangta	3:53
6.	"No More Than My Dream" (꿈일 뿐이죠)	Lee Yoon-jae	Lee	Lee	3:38
7.	"Reminiscence#1" (일어나기)	Ahn Ik-su	Ahn	Ahn	4:11
8.	"Blue Snow"	Kangta	Song Kwang-sik	Song	4:09
9.	"Always" (그녀의 목소리가 들립니다)	Kangta	Song	Song	4:25
10.	"Prayer" (잠든 기도)	Kangta	Kangta; Song	Song	5:45
11.	"Agape" (instrumental)		Kangta	Kangta	5:04
12.	"Always" (instrumental)		Song	Song	4:25

=== Chinese version ===
1. 면구 / 面具 (Paralysis)
2. 쓰레기 (Illusion)

== Charts and sales ==
=== Weekly charts ===
Weekly chart performance for "Just One Day"
Chart (2005)	Peak position
Malaysia (988 FM, excl. Chinese songs)	1

Weekly chart performance for the Chinese version of "Persona"
Chart (2005)	Peak position
Malaysia (988 FM)	2

=== Monthly charts and sales ===
Chart (2005)	Peak position	Peak sales
South Korea (MIAK)	3	44,104

=== Year-end charts and sales ===
Chart (2005)	Position	Sales
South Korea (MIAK)	34	50,060
