= 2003 Winter Vacation in SMTown.com =

Studio album by SM Town
- Released: December 5, 2003
- Genres: Christmas; R&B; dance-pop
- Length: 41:58
- Languages: Korean; English
- Label: S.M. Entertainment
- Producer: Lee Soo-man (exec.)

SM Town chronology
| '03 Summer Vacation in SMTown.com (2003) | 2003 Winter Vacation in SMTown.com (2003) | '04 Summer Vacation In SMTown.com (2004) |

2003 Winter Vacation in SMTown.com (stylized as 2003 Winter Vacation in SMTOWN.com) is the fifth winter album (and seventh overall) by SM Town, the S.M. Entertainment roster. The studio album was released and distributed by S.M. on December 5, 2003. It is also the first SM Town album to not feature boy band Shinhwa, since all members had left back in May of the year the album was released.

The album peaked at number ten on the MIAK monthly charts, and sold almost 20,000 copies by the end of 2003. Meanwhile, Shinhwa, SES, and Fly to the Sky did not participate as their contracts with SM ended

== Background ==
Participating artists include Yoo Young-jin, Moon Hee-jun and Kangta (both ex-H.O.T.), Shoo (ex-S.E.S.), BoA, Dana and Lina (pre-the Grace), Fly to the Sky, and Black Beat.

== Commercial performance ==
The album was released at a time when S.M. suffered a decline from poor management. Despite this, 2003 Winter Vacation in SMTown.com saw moderate commercial success. It peaked at number ten on the MIAK/RIAK monthly charts, and sold 19,943 copies in December 2003.

== Track listing ==
| No. | Title | Lyrics | Music | Arrangement | Length |
|---|---|---|---|---|---|
| 1. | "Snowflake" (sung by SM Town) | Kenzie | Kenzie | Kenzie | 3:37 |
| 2. | "Winter Story" (sung by Moon Hee-jun, Kangta and Jiyeon) | Kwon Yoon-jung | Hwang Seong-je | Hwang | 4:10 |
| 3. | "The Christmas Song" (sung by Kangta) | Robert Wells; Mel Tormé | Tormé | Song Kwang-sik | 4:52 |
| 4. | "Winter Wonderland" (sung by Moon Hee-jun) | | Felix Bernard | | 3:32 |
| 5. | "Feel the Same" (sung by BoA) | Yoon Jung | Akira | Akira | 4:32 |
| 6. | "Silent Night, Holy Night" (sung by Fly to the Sky) | John Freeman Young | | Song | 3:35 |
| 7. | "I Dream of You" (sung by Jiyeon) | Kim Young-hoo; Sara Ogafawara | Kim; William Pyon | Kim | 4:45 |
| 8. | "Winter Invitation" (sung by Yoo Young-jin) | Yoo Young-jin | Yoo Han-jin | | 2:57 |
| 9. | "White" (sung by Shoo) | Park Chang-hyun | Park | | 3:06 |
| 10. | "Choice" (sung by Black Beat) | Bae Hwa-young | Hwang | | 3:09 |
| 11. | "Be My Love" (sung by Dana) | Choi Hee-joo | Choi | | 3:43 |
| Total length: | | | | | 41:58 |

=== Notes ===
- Lina is credited as Jiyeon in this album.
- "Snowflake" and "Winter Story" are stylized in all caps.

== Charts and sales ==
=== Monthly charts ===
| Chart (December 2003) | Peak position |
|---|---|
| South Korean Albums (MIAK) | 10 |

=== Sales ===
| Region | Sales |
|---|---|
| South Korea (MIAK) | 19,943 |
