= I Am (2012 film) =

- Theatrical poster
- Directed by: Choi Jin-sung
- Produced by: Park Ji-seong; Jeong Yoon-jae; Kang Dong-goo; Lee Soo-man
- Starring: Kangta; BoA; TVXQ; Super Junior; Girls' Generation; Shinee f(x)
- Cinematography: Kim Goo-hyeong; Shin Seong-hwan
- Edited by: Kim Chang-ju; Kim Woo-hyeon
- Music by: Choi Jae-hwa
- Production companies: CJ Entertainment; S.M. Entertainment
- Distributed by: CJ Entertainment
- Release dates: 15 May 2012 (Los Angeles Asian Pacific Film Festival); 21 June 2012 (South Korea)
- Running time: 116 minutes
- Country: South Korea
- Language: Korean

I Am - SM Town Live World Tour in Madison Square Garden is a 2012 South Korean documentary film directed by Choi Jin-sung, that is about 32 SM Town K-pop artists on their journey to become the first Asian singers to stage their milestone SMTown Live '10 World Tour concert at Madison Square Garden in New York. The film was originally scheduled for release in South Korea on 10 May 2012, but was postponed to 21 June 2012, due to audio issues.

== Synopsis ==
The movie follows 32 artists from SM Town as they rehearse and go about their daily lives.

== Cast ==
- Kangta
- BoA
- TVXQ: U-Know Yunho, Max Changmin
- Super Junior: Leeteuk, Yesung, Shindong, Sungmin, Eunhyuk, Donghae, Siwon, Ryeowook, and Kyuhyun.
- Girls' Generation: Taeyeon, Jessica, Sunny, Tiffany, Hyoyeon, Yuri, Sooyoung, Yoona, and Seohyun.
- Shinee: Onew, Jonghyun, Key, Minho, and Taemin
- f(x): Victoria, Amber, Luna, Sulli, and Krystal.

== Music ==
On April 24, 2012, SM Town released the film's theme song, "Dear My Family", along with its music video. It is a remake of the song of the same name from Yoo Young-jin's 2001 third album and 2002 Winter Vacation in SMTown.com – My Angel My Light performed by Kangta, Moon Hee-joon, S.E.S., Shinhwa, Fly to the Sky and BoA. The 2012 version is performed by BoA, Kangta, TVXQ, Yesung of Super Junior, Taeyeon of Girls' Generation, Jonghyun of Shinee, Luna of f(x) and Baekhyun, D.O., Luhan & Chen of EXO. A newer remake, with the additional singers; Kyuhyun of Super Junior, Wendy of Red Velvet, and Jaehyun of NCT, was released on SMTOWN's YouTube page on December 29, 2017. The music video contains footage from a SMTOWN concert that took place before the passing of former SHINee member Jonghyun, who plays a vital role in both the song and video.

== International releases ==
- United States: July 13–19, 2012 at CGV CINEMAS in LA
- Indonesia: May 18–20, 2012 at the Blitz Megaplex theater in Jakarta.
- Hong Kong: May 18–30, 2012
- Singapore: May 25, 2012
- Taiwan: May 25, 2012
- Japan: June 2, 2012
- Thailand: July 7–8, 2012 (Only in Paragon Cineplex at Siam Paragon, Bangkok)
- Vietnam: June 22, 2012

== DVD releases ==
- Japan: October 3, 2012
- United States: November 6, 2012
- Taiwan: October 19, 2012
- Hong Kong: September 25, 2012
- Korea: September 27, 2012
- Thailand: December 6, 2012
