= Song Kwang-sik =

South Korean pianist

- Born: March 22, 1966 (age 59)
- Occupations: Pianist; Composer
- Years active: 1999–present
- Employer: SM Entertainment

Korean name
- Hangul: 송광식
- Hanja: 宋光軾
- RR: Song Gwangsik
- MR: Song Kwangsik

Song Kwang-sik (born March 22, 1966) is a South Korean pianist, working both as a recording and studio artist signed under the label of SM Entertainment. He has released two solo albums and have worked in several collaboration albums by SM Town, many soundtracks, scores and musicals.

== History ==
=== 1987–1999: Early works ===
Song's first broadcast appearance was in 1987 at KBS through 1st College Idol Festival where he performed the song "추억한잎". He then performed "노래하는 인형" on MBC through Riverside Song Festival in 1991 and later performed "광화문에서 너의 마음까지" on SBS through 1st Music Festival: New Generation of Idols in 1992. Song performed the song "이별 96" (Goodbye '96) in MBC Riverside Song Festival in 1996 and also received a special award. Song once again appeared on MBC Riverside Song Festival performing "널 사랑한단 말로" in 1999. In 1999, he helped in house sessions and album productions for the popular idol groups H.O.T. and S.E.S.

=== 2000–2002: Breakthrough and solo albums ===
On December 1, 2000, Song released his first solo album as a pianist entitled My Story under the label S.M. Entertainment. The album contained 15 tracks. He also participated in music composition, planning and production of collaboration album, Christmas Winter Vacation in SM Town by SM Town. Same year he won a gold medal at the 4th National CCM Contest for performing "새로운 시작" (New Start).

In 2001, Song provided music for several studio albums including Surprise by S.E.S., Polaris by Kangta, Dana: First Album by Dana, and Alone by Moon Hee-joon. On October 1, 2001, he also released his second piano album entitled Dreams of Heaven. On December 24, 2001, OST for TV series A.f.r.i.k.a was released crediting Song for his music contribution.

In late 2002, Song helped produce the special ballad album The Legend by Shin Seung-hun. He also led a hand in development of another collaboration album 2002 Winter Vacation In SMTown which was released on December 1, 2002.

=== 2003–present ===
In 2003 and onwards, Song he participated in many original scores and soundtracks for various TV series. He also took part in music production of summer and winter collaborative albums by SM Town of 2006, 2007 and 2009. Latest such album, 2011 Winter SMTown – The Warmest Gift, also features his music contribution. Song composed and recorded songs "Reflection I" and "El Dorado" that were used for teaser videos featuring D.O., Suho and Chanyeol, of EXO-K.

== Discography ==
=== Studio albums ===
- My Story (Released: December 1, 2000)
  - Track 1: "안개꽃을 좋아한 아이"
  - Track 2: "My Story"
  - Track 3: "기다림은 비가 되어"
  - Track 4: "The Winter Of Children"
  - Track 5: "오랜 사진 속의 기차길"
  - Track 6: "우주... 별.. 콩."
  - Track 7: "어머니의 기도"
  - Track 8: "회상 I"
  - Track 9: "Pa Pa"
  - Track 10: "Waltz No.3"
  - Track 11: "친구... 설레임"
  - Track 12: "Balcony Song"
  - Track 13: "회상 II"
  - Track 14: "오후에의 풍경"
  - Track 15: "The Music"
- Dreams of Heaven (Released: October 1, 2001)
  - Track 1: "Prelude"
  - Track 2: "Dreams Of Heaven"
  - Track 3: "A Child's Mind"
  - Track 4: "Return To My Home"
  - Track 5: "The Poem"
  - Track 6: "Time & Dancer"
  - Track 7: "Lover In My Heart"
  - Track 8: "A Boy In The City"
  - Track 9: "Shopping To The Moon"
  - Track 10: "Memory"
  - Track 11: "Pine Trees" (세그루의 소나무)
  - Track 12: "Really? Really?"
  - Track 13: "E.Ya"
  - Track 14: "Jesus On The Hill"
  - Track 15: "Prayer Song"
