= Polaris (Kangta album) =

Studio album by Kangta
- Released: August 16, 2001
- Genres: R&B; jazz; ballad; dance-pop
- Length: 55:36
- Language: Korean
- Label: SM
- Producers: Ahn Chil-hyun; Lee Soo-man (exec.)

Kangta chronology
Polaris (2001)	Pine Tree (2002)

Singles from Polaris
- 1. "Polaris" Released: August 16, 2001

Polaris (Korean: 북극성; RR: bukgeukseong; lit. 'north pole star') is the debut studio album by South Korean singer-songwriter Kangta, released on August 16, 2001, by S.M. Entertainment.

== Background ==
On May 13, 2001, Jang Woo-hyuk, Tony Ahn, and Lee Jae-won of the South Korean boy band H.O.T. held a press conference, announcing that they would end their contracts with SM Entertainment and move to another company. This marked H.O.T.'s de facto disbandment. While Jang, An, and Lee chose to leave SM Entertainment, Kangta and Moon Hee-jun had renewed their contracts the previous year. When SM was asked if the remaining members would pursue solo careers, the company stated, "Regardless of the group disbanding, we had originally planned to do a mix of solo and group activities." In a press conference held on June 27, Kangta and Moon Hee-jun announced that they would release solo albums in August and October respectively.

== Composition ==
Polaris is predominantly a ballad album, featuring a range of genres such as jazz, R&B, and dance. Four of the songs were composed by Kangta, while composers such as Sim Sang-won and Kim Hyeong-seok contributed to the rest of the album. The album opens with "Falling in Love", a swing number about the emotions experienced while in love. "Polaris", the lead single, is a pop ballad, which Kangta wrote, composed, and arranged over the span of six months. It features orchestral instrumentation and details a man "who wants to be like the North Star, a star that always stays in one place and acts as a guide." "Thanks God" was composed by pianist Chung Won-young and was described as a "jazz ballad". His singing style in the song has been compared to Nat King Cole. "My Life" is the album's only dance-pop song, with a triplet rhythm and orchestral backing; the lyrics "express the confidence that young people [Kangta's] age have in the world ahead." "With Your White Face" is a jazz standard-style remake of a 1987 song by Lee Soo-man, while "Rainy Day" is a cover of a Shin Seung-hun song.

== Release and promotion ==
Polaris was released on August 16, 2001. A month before the album's release, the title track was used in a commercial for KTF's wireless internet service Magic N, which Kangta starred in. The commercial was directed by Lee Chan, who also produced the music video for "Polaris". His first solo activity was a guest appearance in an NRG concert on the 17th; the next day, he made his TV debut through an hour-long special in the SBS variety program Saturday Is Fun.

Several music videos were released to promote the album. The first, "Polaris", was directed by Cha Seok-ho, a commercial director, and was filmed over the span of four days and three nights. In the video, a yet to debut Dana appeared alongside Kangta. Conceptually, it centers around a man reminiscing about the times spent with his ex-lover. In one scene, said to convey "sadness and longing for her that he cannot forget", Kangta dressed as a woman. A motion control camera was used to film the same scene with Kangta and Dana, allowing for cross-cutting between the two. The second music video released was for "Thanks God", which was first revealed through the singer's official website on November 5, 2001. The video, released as an act of "fan service", was shot in Apgujeong-dong and features Kangta playing the piano.

== Track listing ==
CD and digital streaming (Note: Durations for each track may vary depending on which streaming platform.)
No.	Title	Lyrics	Music	Arrangement	Length
1.	"Falling In Love" (오! 그대를; O! geudaereul; 'Oh! You')	An So-yeon; Ha Jung-ho	Ha	Ha	3:33
2.	"Longing" (별의 고백; Byeorui gobaek; 'Star's Confession')	Lee Jung-ha			2:09
3.	"Polaris" (북극성; Bukgeukseong)	Ahn Chil-hyun	Ahn	Ahn	4:03
4.	"Thanks God"	Jung Won-young	Jung	Jung	4:53
5.	"My Life" (스물 셋; Seumul set; 'Twenty-three')	Ahn	Ahn	Ahn	3:23
6.	"Last Winter" (겨울; Gyeoul)	Ahn			1:22
7.	"In Your Eyes"	Ahn	Shim Sang-won	Shim	4:14
8.	"Still" (당신이 알고 있던 난; Dangsini algo itdeon nan; 'The me you knew')	Ahn	Ahn	Ahn	4:19
9.	"Doodidub"	Hong Jong-hwa (SM)	Hong	Hong	4:10
10.	"I Will" (나 세상 나; Na sesang na; 'Me, the world, me')	Ahn			1:37
11.	"Late Summer Night" (그해여름; Geuhaeyeoreum; 'That summer')	Ahn	Ahn	Ahn	4:43
12.	"Blue Moon"	Ahn	Eun Bi	Eun Bi; Lee Hong-rae	4:46
13.	"With Your White Face" (하얀 얼굴로; Hayan eolgullo)	Choi Jae-gyu	Hong	Hong	3:33
14.	"Rainy Day"	Shin Seung-hun	Shin	Kim Hyung-seok	4:51
15.	"Polaris" (instrumental)		Ahn	Ahn	4:00
Total length:					55:36
