= Tasty (band) =

Korean-Chinese music duo

Tasty 테이스티
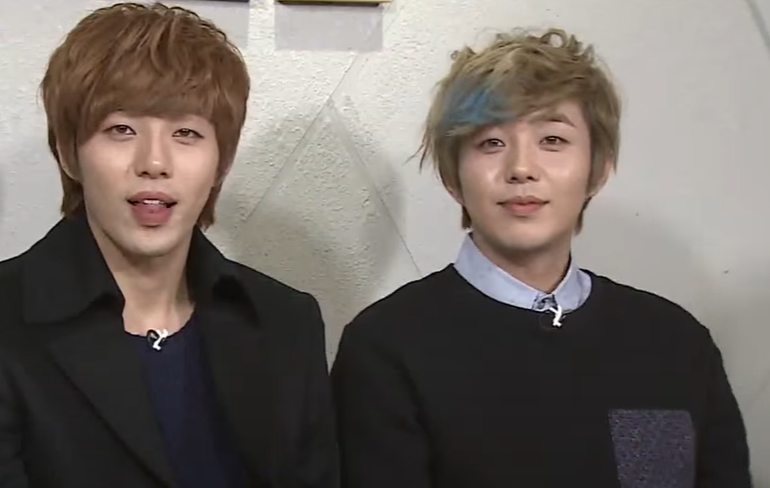

Background information
- Also known as: Tasty 2Wins
- Origin: Seoul, South Korea
- Genres: K-pop; dance-pop
- Years active: 2012–2015
- Label: Woollim Entertainment (2012–2015)
- Members: Daeryong; Soryong

Tasty (Korean: 테이스티), stylized as TASTY, was a K-pop duo formed by Woollim Entertainment in 2012. The group was composed of identical twins Daeryong and Soryong. They made their debut in August 2012 with the single album Spectrum. In 2015, they terminated their contract with Woollim Entertainment and went back to China. Since then, they changed the group name to Hanch兄弟(Hanchtwins).

== History ==
Twins Jung So-ryong (Hangul: 정소룡; Chinese: 郑小龙 Zheng Xiao Long) and Dae-ryong (Hangul: 정대룡; Chinese: 郑大龙 Zheng Da Long) were born in Jilin, China, on February 25, 1988 (age 38).

=== 2006–11: Training under JYP Entertainment ===
Prior to their debut under Woollim Entertainment, the duo were trainees under another South Korean agency, JYP Entertainment from 2006 to 2011. During this time, they spent time in the U.S., where they trained with choreographers that had worked with Beyoncé and Ne-Yo. They also appeared as backup dancers for the singer and founder of JYP Entertainment, Park Jin-young.

The duo made the decision to leave the agency after five years in training, citing in an interview with Newsen the difficulty of seeing other trainees debut before them.

=== 2012–13: Debut with Spectrum, Spectacular, and "Day n Night" ===
Tasty made their debut under Woollim Entertainment on August 9, 2012, with the single "You Know Me (너 나 알아)". Their corresponding debut single album was written and composed by Rphabet and consisted of four tracks.

A year later, on August 7, 2013, Tasty released the single "MAMAMA", a fusion of swing and hip hop composed by Singaporean producer Tat Tong. The single's lyrics were written by Hoya and Dongwoo of Infinite H, who also featured in the music video. The corresponding four-track single album Spectacular featured a collaboration with rapper Hanhae from Phantom.

On November 27, 2013, Tasty released the single "Day 'n Night (떠나가)". The music video was shot in Hong Kong and featured actress and model Esom as the female protagonist.

=== 2015: Departure from Woollim Entertainment ===
On July 15, 2015, Tasty announced via their personal Weibo account that they would be moving back to China and ceasing to promote in Korea. Woollim Entertainment claimed to be uninformed of their one-sided decision, and had recently been in discussions with the duo about their scheduled comeback. Tasty refuted these claims and expressed dissatisfaction with the company's management. The duo then promoted in China under the name DLXL.

== Discography ==
=== Single albums ===
Title	Album details	Peak chart positions	Sales
Title	Album details	KOR	Sales
Spectrum	Released: August 9, 2012 (KOR); Label: Woollim Entertainment; Format: CD, digital download	13	KOR: 2,858
Spectacular	Released: August 8, 2013 (KOR); Label: Woollim Entertainment; Format: CD, digital download	11	KOR: 2,732
Addiction (靠近我)	Released: August 22, 2014 (CHN); Label: Woollim Entertainment; Format: CD, digital download	—	
"—" denotes releases that did not chart or were not released in that region.

=== Singles ===
Title	Year	Peak chart positions	Sales	Album
Title	Year	KOR	Sales	Album
"You Know Me" (너 나 알아)	2012	75	KOR: 74,693	Spectrum
"Mamama"	2013	61	KOR: 44,053	Spectacular
"Day 'n Night" (떠나가)	2013	—		Non-album single
"Addiction"	2014	—		Spectacular
"—" denotes releases that did not chart or were not released in that region.

== Concerts and tours ==
=== As participating act ===
- 2013: SM Town Live World Tour III
- 2014: SM Town Live World Tour IV

=== As supporting act ===
- 2012: INFINITE 2012 ARENA TOUR in JAPAN (Second Invasion Evolution PLUS)
- 2013–2014: Girls' Generation World Tour Girls & Peace

== Videography ==
=== Music videos ===
Year	Title	Length
2012	You Know Me	3:18
2012	MAMAMA	2:39
2013	Day N' Night	5:09
2013	Day N' Night (Performance Ver.)	3:21
2014	Addiction (Chinese Ver.)	4:53
2014	You Know Me (Chinese Ver.)	3:27
2014	Day N' Night (Chinese Ver.)	5:05

== Awards and nominations ==
Year	Award	Category	Nominated work	Result
2015	14th Huading Awards	Global New Singer Awards	—N/a	Won
2015	29th Golden Disk Awards	Next Generation Awards	—N/a	Won
