= Breaka Shaka =

Breaka Shaka 爱, 频率
- Digital cover

EP by Kangta
- Released: September 13, 2010
- Recorded: 2010
- Genres: Pop; electropop; acid house; techno; R&B; dance
- Length: 18:33
- Language: Mandarin
- Labels: SM Entertainment; Avex Taiwan
- Producer: Lee Soo Man

Kangta chronology
Eternity (2008)	Breaka Shaka 爱, 频率 (2010)	'Home' Chapter 1 (2016)

Singles from 爱, 频率 (Breaka Shaka)
- 1. "爱, 频率 (Breaka Shaka)" Released: September 13, 2010

Breaka Shaka (爱, 频率) is the first Chinese-language EP and second overall by South Korean singer Kangta. It was released in 2010. It was digitally released on September 13 and physically on September 14, 2010. It marks the first released by Kangta since he returned from military service.

The music video for Breaka Shaka starred his label mate, f(x)'s Victoria.

== Track listing ==
No.	Title	Lyrics	Music	Length
1.	"爱, 频率 (Breaka Shaka)" (Love, Frequency)	Zhou Mi	Yoo Young-jin	3:59
2.	"记得 (Remember)"	Zhou Mi	Kangta	3:49
3.	"我们的彩虹 (Rainbow)" (Our Rainbow)		Park Jun Ha	3:45
4.	"不习惯 (Habit)" (Unused)		Kangta	3:26
5.	"Many Times"	Zhou Mi		3:37
Total length:				18:33
