= Dana (South Korean singer) =

South Korean singer (born 1986)

- 홍성미
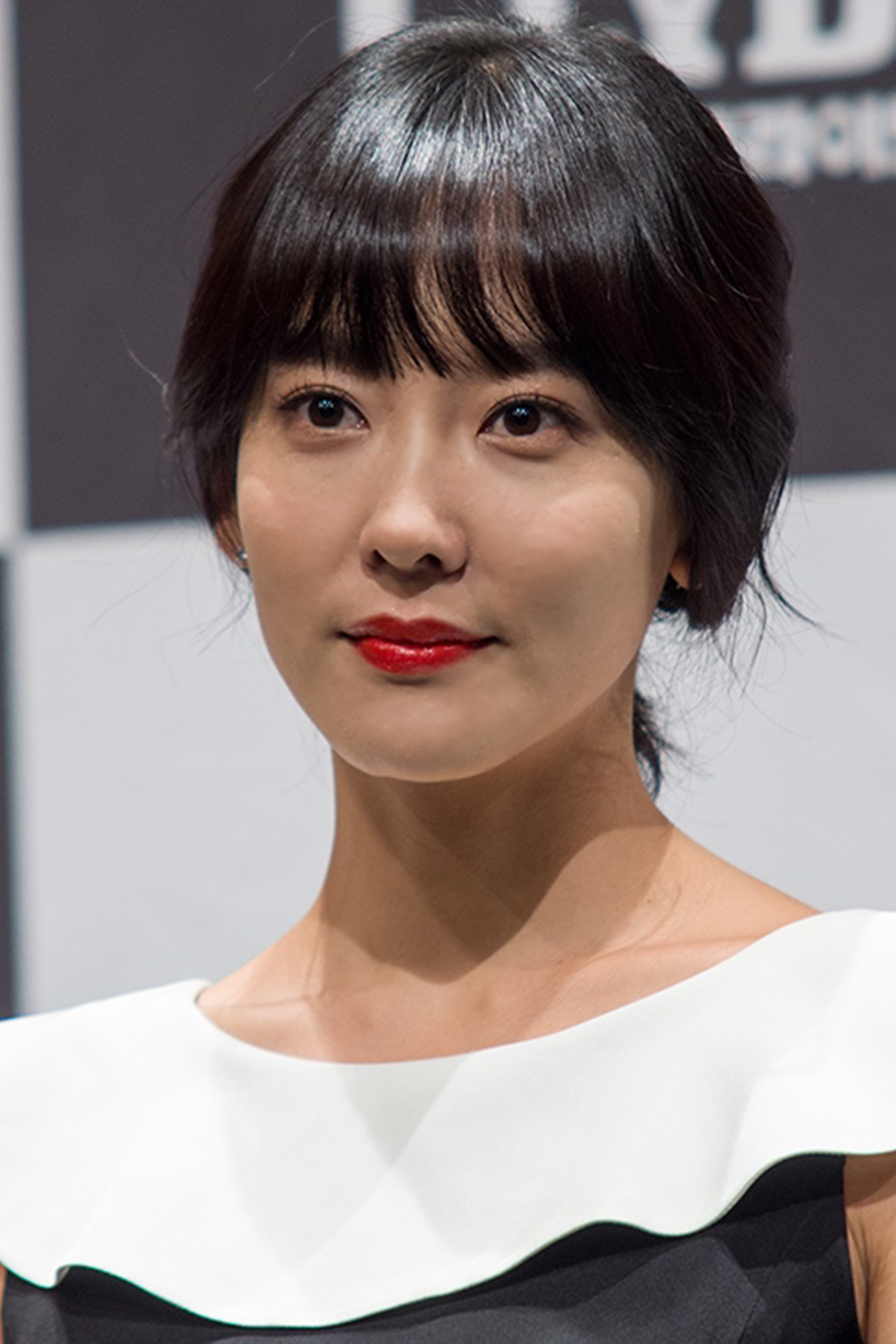
- Dana at the Bonnie & Clyde press conference in 2013
- Born: Hong Sung-mi; 17 July 1986 (age 40); Seoul, South Korea
- Occupations: Singer; actress; vocal coach
- Musical career
- Genres: K-pop; R&B; dance; a cappella
- Instrument: Vocals
- Years active: 2000–present
- Label: SM
- Member of: The Grace; Dana & Sunday

Korean name
- Hangul: 홍성미
- Hanja: 洪性美
- RR: Hong Seongmi
- MR: Hong Sŏngmi
- IPA: ɸʷo̞ŋsʰɘːŋmi

Stage name
- Hangul: 다나
- RR: Dana
- MR: Tana
- IPA: ta̠ːna̠

Hong Sung-mi (Korean: 홍성미; born 17 July 1986), known professionally as Dana, is a South Korean singer, musical actress and vocal coach. Dana first made her public appearance with acts on the boy group H.O.T's sci-fi movie Age of Peace in 2000. Dana later made her official debut as a solo singer, with released full-album DANA (2001) and Maybe (2003). Concurrently with her music career in 2002, Dana made her acting debut with cast in the third season of MBC sitcom Nonstop and also made her musical theatre debut with cast as Wendy in Peterpan.

After she took a break for music scene almost two-years, Dana returned with debuting as a member of girl group The Grace in April 2005. Through the group's career, they releases and performs music in Korean and Japanese with a total of three studio albums. In mid 2010, the group's halted all their activities and focusing their own activities. In July 2011, the groups returned with formed duo sub-unit Dana & Sunday with only released single "One More Chance" before also took a break.

Dana returned in musical theatre with cast in Daejanggeum Season Three, Rock of Ages, The Three Musketeers in 2010. Following this, she earned a number of roles, appearing in the notably musical Catch Me If You Can (2012), Bonnie and Clyde (2013), The Great Gatsby Re:Boot (2016). In 2016, Dana later returned to the music scene with released her single "Touch You" through SM Station.

== Career ==
=== 2000–2003: Career beginnings ===
Prior to debuting in a girl group, she promoted as an actress in popular boyband H.O.T's Age of Peace movie and in Kangta's "Polaris" music video.

Starting off as a solo artist under Lee Soo Man's SM Entertainment label, Dana was labeled the "next BoA".

In 2001, she released her fairly successful debut single "Sesang kkeut kkaji" (Until The end of The World), which was an adapted song of "Tell Me No More Lies" composed by European songwriter Stefan Aberg. She followed up with "Diamond", a pop/dance track featuring Jung Yunho (U-Know, who eventually became a member of TVXQ in 2003).

Her career blossomed and was furthered through appearances on variety shows, such as X-Man, as well as playing a main role in the sitcom Nonstop. Her second album "Maybe" was released in 2003; however, it sold poorly. From that point on, she disappeared from the music industry (aside from SMTOWN collaborations) until the debut of The Grace.

=== 2005–2011: The Grace and Dana & Sunday ===
Dana redebuted as a member of South Korea girl group The Grace in 2005. The group debuted on 29 April 2005 in China and 1 May 2005 in South Korea. For the group's fourth Japanese single, she composed the music to her own solo song "Sayonara No Mukou Ni".As of 2010, the group was indefinite hiatus.

Starting in May 2010, Dana started her musical acting career with played role on Daejanggeum Season Three. Later the same year, she starred in Rock of Ages as Sherrie.

In late 2010 and early 2011, she starred as Constance in The Three Musketeers. She commented in an interview about being nervous about having to kiss Super Junior Kyuhyun.

In June 2011, an image was leaked of SM Entertainment's itinerary for 2011 which included a release for a new single by CSJH. SM later confirmed that CSJH would be making a comeback with a new image. On 8 July 2011, CSJH's Dana & Sunday made a comeback as a sub-unit with a digital single titled 'One More Chance'; the single was released on 11 July.

=== 2012–present: Solo activities ===
From March 2012 to June 2012, she was cast as Brenda Strong for the re-run of the musical Catch Me If You Can. In September 2013, she starred as Bonnie for the musical Bonnie and Clyde. In February 2014, she returned to cast as Constance in The Three Musketeers. In early 2015, she was cast as Joy for the musical Robin Hood.

After 13 years, Dana returned as soloist with release "Touch You" on 20 May 2016, as a part of SM Entertainment project SM Station. To promote the song, Dana performed on several music programs, The Show, M Countdown, Music Bank, Show! Music Core and Inkigayo from 24–28 May 2016.

In December 2018, Dana starred her first reality show Danalda aired on Lifetime cable channel. The reality show containing Dana's diet challenge after break-up and losing her close brother.

On 24 June 2020, it was reported that Dana would be leaving SM Entertainment after 19 years. SM Entertainment confirmed the news and added, "Our exclusive contract with Dana ended recently. We hope people will continue to support her in her future activities."

== Personal life ==
On 4 May 2016, during MBC's Radio Star, Dana revealed that she had been in a relationship for three years. It was later revealed that Dana's boyfriend is Lee Ho-jae, who is a film/music video director. On 6 November 2018, SM Entertainment announced that the couple broke up.

== Discography ==
=== Studio albums ===
Title	Album details	Sales
Dana	Released: 10 September 2001; Label: SM Entertainment; Formats: CD, cassette, digital download; Track listing: 1. 세상끝까지 (Until the End of the World); 2. Diamond Feat. Yunho; 3. Pretty...; 4. Jealousy; 5. Tonite; 6. Lover; 7. Pray:Play; 8. Feel for You; 9. Behind Love; 10. Valentine; 11. Love Takes Time; 12. For You	KOR: 44,783
Maybe (남겨둔 이야기)	Released: 1 October 2003; Label: SM Entertainment; Formats: CD, cassette, digital download; Track listing: 1. 길들이기 (Friend VS Lover); 2. 남겨둔 이야기 (Maybe); 3. What is Love?; 4. 바램 (Fight Till The End); 5. N&N (End and and); 6. 너를 꿈꾸며 (Love is All I Need); 7. Dream; 8. How 2 Love; 9. I Will; 10. Kiss me 11. Unhappy Day; 12. My Melody; -Streaming TRAX-: 1. What is Love? (Morden Rock Ver.); 2. Swear; 3. Wanna Be	KOR: 14,408

=== Single ===
Title	Year	Peak chart positions	Sales	Album
Title	Year	KOR	Sales	Album
"세상끝까지" (Until the End of the World)	2001	—	—N/a	First Album
"Diamond"	2001	—	—N/a	First Album
"Maybe"	2003	—	—N/a	Maybe
"What is Love?"	2003	—	—N/a	Maybe
"Touch You"	2016	228	—N/a	SM Station Season 1
"—" denotes releases that did not chart or were not released in that region.

=== Featured artists ===
Title	Year	Album
"달이 태양을 가릴 때 (Eclipse) (Remastered Remix)" (with Moonbyul)	2026	—N/a

=== Compilations ===
Albums	Release dates
Christmas Winter Vacation in SMTown.com - Angel Eyes	4 December 2001
Summer Vacation in SMTown.com	10 June 2002
2002 Winter Vacation in SMTown.com - My Angel My Light	6 December 2002
2003 Summer Vacation in SMTown.com	18 June 2003
2003 Winter Vacation in SMTown.com	8 December 2003
2004 Summer Vacation in SMTown.com	2 July 2004
2006 Summer SMTown	20 June 2006
2006 Winter SMTown - Snow Dream	12 December 2006
Billie Jean Look at Me OST	24 January 2007
Air City OST	23 May 2007
2007 Summer SMTown - Fragile	5 July 2007
2007 Winter SMTown - Only Love	10 December 2007
2011 Winter SMTown – The Warmest Gift	13 December 2011
Opera Star 2012 Round 1	13 February 2012
Opera Star 2012 Round 2	20 February 2012
Opera Star 2012 Round 3	27 February 2012
SM Best Album 3	10 August 2012
To the Beautiful You OST	19 September 2012
King of Mask Singer: Episode 41	10 January 2016
Golden Pouch OST	21 December 2016

=== Songs written by Dana ===
Year	Song	Album	Artist	Label	Lyrics		Music	
Year	Song	Album	Artist	Label	Credited	With	Credited	With
2006	Sayonara No Mukou Ni	Juicy Love	Dana	Rhythm Zone	—N/a	—N/a	Yes	—N/a
2013	No More	Pink Tape	f(x)	SM Entertainment	Yes	—N/a	No	—N/a

== Filmography ==
=== Film ===
Year	Title	Role	Notes
2000	Age of Peace	Dana	3D Movie
2015	Sunshine	Sulji	

=== Television series ===
Year	Title	Role	Notes
2002	Nonstop 3	Dana	Sitcom
2011	Bravo, My Love!	Cameo	Sitcom
2012	Drama Special Series: "Amore Mio"	Mi-rae	Special Drama
2016	Golden Pouch	Geum Doo-na	Daily Drama

=== Television ===
Year	Title	Channel	Role	Notes
2003	Dana's DMZ (Daily Music Zone)	iTV	MC	
2012	Opera Star Season 2	tvN	Regular Cast	with Kim Jong Seo, Park Ji Yoon, 8eight's Joo Hee, Son Ho Young, Park Ki Youn
2014	Law of the Jungle in Solomon	SBS	Regular Cast	with Tao, Kikwang, Kim Tae-woo
2016	King of Mask Singer	MBC	Contestant	As Heart Racing Snow Queen

=== Musical theater ===
Year	Title	Role	Notes
2002	Peter Pan	Wendy	Musical
2010	(고궁뮤지컬 대장금) Daejanggeum Season Three	Seo Jang-geum (서장금)	Musical
2010	(락 오브 에이지) Rock of Ages	Sherrie Christian	Musical also starring Sunday, Onew, and Jay
2010–2011	(삼총사)The Three Musketeers	Constance	Musical also starring Kyuhyun and Jay
2012	(캐치 미 이프 유캔) Catch Me If You Can	Brenda Strong	Musical also starring Kyuhyun, Key and Sunny
2013	(보니 앤 클라이드) Bonnie and Clyde	Bonnie	Musical
2013–2014	(삼총사)The Three Musketeers	Constance	Musical also starring Jun.K, Key and J-min
2015	Robin Hood	Joy	Musical also starring Cho Kyuhyun, Yang Yoseob
2015–2016	(위대한캣츠비 Re:Boot) The Great Gatsby Re:Boot	Seon	Musical
2016	(별이 빛나는 밤에) Byeol-i Bichnaneun Bam-e	Hanjuri	Musical

== Videography ==
=== Solo music video ===
- "세상끝까지"
- "Diamond"
- "남겨둔 이야기" (Maybe)
- "What is Love" (Original Ver.)

== Awards and nominations ==
=== South Korean Performing Arts Awards ===
Year	Category	Work	Result
2001	Newcomer Award	—N/a	Won

=== Mnet Asian Music Awards ===
Year	Category	Work	Result
2001	Best New Female Artist	"Until the end of the World"	Nominated

=== MTV Style Awards ===
Year	Category	Work	Result
2003	Annual Korean Artist Award	—N/a	Won

=== Special awards ===
==== Chinese Ministry of Culture ====
Year	Category	Work	Result
2003	Minister Contribution Award	—N/a	Won
