= Kangta =

South Korean singer (born 1979)

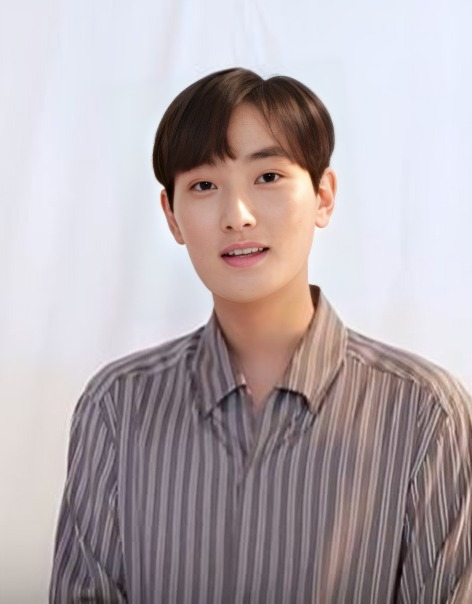
- Kangta in 2018
- Born: An Chil-hyun; October 10, 1979 (age 47); Seoul, South Korea
- Occupations: Singer-songwriter; composer; record producer; actor; radio personality; creative director
- Musical career
- Genres: K-pop; dance; R&B
- Instruments: Vocals; piano
- Years active: 1996–present
- Label: SM
- Member of: SM Town
- Formerly of: H.O.T.; S; Kangta & Vanness
- Website: Official website

Korean name
- Hangul: 안칠현
- RR: An Chilhyeon
- MR: An Ch'irhyŏn

Stage name
- Hangul: 강타
- RR: Gangta
- MR: Kangt'a

Signature
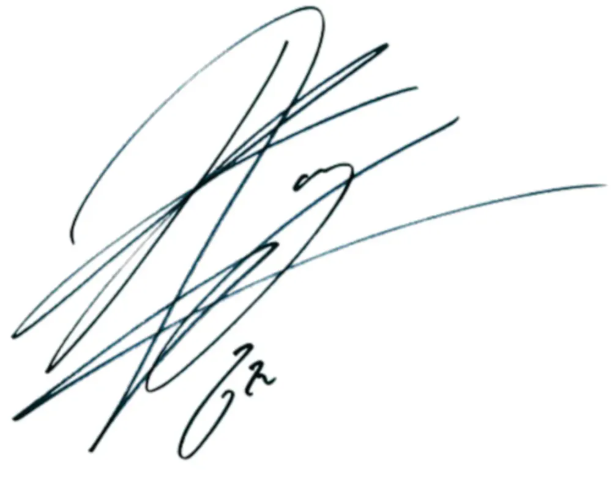

An Chil-hyun (Korean: 안칠현; born October 10, 1979), known professionally as Kangta (강타), is a South Korean singer, composer, songwriter, record producer, actor and radio personality. Known for his work as a member of boy band H.O.T., he is currently an executive at his longtime agency SM Entertainment since 2005. He is also the chief producer of Smashhit from SM's label Kreation Music Rights since 2023 and the general producer of SM's music label SMArt since 2025.

== Career ==
=== 1996–2001: H.O.T. ===
Kangta was discovered at Lotte World, a theme park, when he was 13 years old. He made his debut on-screen appearance as a backup dancer together with future bandmate Moon Hee-joon for labelmate singer Yoo Young-jin. Kangta eventually decided to become a singer with Moon and three others, Jang Woo-hyuk, Tony An, and Lee Jae-won to form H.O.T. in 1996. The group disbanded in 2001 when the group's contract expired and the members decided not to renew it.

=== 2001–2002: Solo debut, Polaris and Pine Tree ===
Kangta released his first studio album Polaris on August 16, 2001, and began his solo career with the title track "Polaris". On this album, he wrote, composed and arranged seven songs and produced the album. Even at the beginning of the recession in the music market, it sold 300,000 copies within a week of its release, ranking first in record sales, and was a great success with sales close to 500,000 copies. In December of the same year, SM Entertainment's singers began to enter China in earnest, starting with performances in Beijing and Shanghai, China.

From March 4 to October 20, 2002, he was the main DJ of Kangta's Declaration of Freedom at KBS 2FM, and from October 21 to April 20, 2003, he was a double DJ with Shin Hye-sung. Later in March, the heroine Seong-so (played by Lim Eun-kyung) was cast as the beloved singer Ga Jun-oh in Jang Sun-woo's film The Second Coming of a Match Girl and made a cameo appearance.

On August 1 of the same year, he released his second studio album Pine Tree for the first time in more than a year, and as with his first album, he recorded more than 70% of his own songs. Prior to his broadcast activities after the album's release, his first solo concert Kangta 1st Concert 'Pine Tree' was held three times on Aug. 24 and 25 at Jamsil Indoor Gymnasium.

=== 2004–2005 : Acting roles and Director of SM Entertainment ===
Kangta received several offers and accepted a drama offer in China. In 2004, he starred in a drama called Magic Touch of Fate together with Taiwanese actors and actresses, Ruby Lin and Alec Su. Kangta portrayed the role of the evil magician Jin-Xiu. A few months later, he starred in a KBS drama, Loveholic in Korea.

In 2005, Kangta was appointed director when he re-signed with SM and received a portion of the down payment as a stock.

=== 2005 : the third studio album Persona ===
Kangta released his third album, Persona, in 2005. In July of the same year, the third studio album Persona was officially released in Taiwan and China. The album became a hot topic because it had 500,000 pre-orders. The title song "Persona" was a big hit in China.

In 2005, Kangta was chosen as the best Korean singer overseas, according to Arirang International Broadcasting. A poll was issued over the internet, allowing only people outside of Korea to vote.

=== 2007 ===
Kangta also acted in his second Chinese drama, Love in the City 2. In the series, Kangta portrayed the life of a successful CEO with a dull life. In March Kangta was announced to be playing a supporting role in JTBC's 2012 drama Happy Ending as Kim So-eun's love interest.

In 2007, he filmed two dramas and Love in the City 2 aired on October 1, 2007. In January 2007, Kangta took part in the Hallyu Festival in Osaka, which also featured Jun Jin and Lee Min-woo of Shinhwa, SG Wannabe and actor Song Seung-heon at the Osaka Dome.

Kangta enlisted for mandatory military service in April 2008 for 21 months of active duty. During which time he starred in military musical Mine with rapper Yang Dong-geun. It is about the true life story of Lieutenant Lee Jong-myung, who lost his legs in a land mine explosion near the demilitarized zone, in June 2000, when he saved fellow soldier, Sul Dong-seob from the minefield.

=== 2010: Chinese EP Breaka Shaka ===
After two years and five months of hiatus from the entertainment industry due to Korean military service, Kangta released Chinese EP Breaka Shaka, which was released on September 14.

In 2013, he produced the OST for That Winter, the Wind Blows, and "Gray Paper" and "And One" were written and composed by Kangta. He also produced Zhou Mi's album Rewind in 2014.

=== 2016: 'Home' Chapter 1 ===
In March 2014, Kangta, alongside labelmate BoA, was appointed as a de facto creative director of S.M. Entertainment.

In October 2016, S.M. Entertainment announced that Kangta would hold a concert to celebrate his 20th debut anniversary titled Coming Home, as a part of SM Entertainment's concert series The Agit. The concert was held from November 4 to November 6 at SMTown Theatre. On October 11, S.M. Entertainment confirmed that Kangta currently preparing his new album. On the same day, it was confirmed that Kangta would appear on JTBC's A Hyung I Know and would be aired on October 29. Kangta released his first Korean extended play 'Home' Chapter 1 on November 3. The album contains five tracks, with the lead single titled "Diner".

In 2017, He released his digital single "Doll" with Wendy and Seulgi of Red Velvet.

=== 2021–2022: "Cough Syrup", 25th anniversary project and Eyes on You ===
After a three-year musical hiatus, the new song "Cough Syrup" was pre-released on SMTOWN LIVE 'Culture Humanity' on January 1, 2021. And it was officially released as SM STATION on January 15.

SM Entertainment announced that Kangta would begin preparations for his twenty-fifth anniversary project throughout 2021. He first released the single "Freezing" on March 24. Kangta released the remake single "Free To Fly 2021" on July 14. The second single for the project "Christmas in July" was released on July 28. The third single "Maybe" was released on October 12. The fourth single "Slow Dance" was released on January 12, 2022.

On August 17, 2022, it was announced that Kangta would be making a comeback (Note: A comeback in K-pop is a "return" to musical activity, and a release of a new project for promotion.) on September 7 with his fourth studio album Eyes on You, marking his first almost two decades (since 2005). The lead single of the same name was released on the same day the ten-track album was released, and it included "Skip" featuring NCT Taeyong and "Love Song" featuring Paloalto.

On April 22, 2023, SM STATION released its digital single, "When I Close My Eyes". The song was sung with Lee A-reum, a vocalist of Hanbitarts, in commemoration of Day of the Disabled.

=== 2023-present: Producers' activities ===
In 2023, Kangta is the executive producer of SMASHHIT Productions Team, one of the four CICs of Kreation Music Rights, SM Entertainment's music publishing subsidiary. And in 2024, he expanded his field by working on songs with a number of singers, discovering various producers.

== Personal life ==
He is an experienced songwriter and composer, having written over 100 songs for H.O.T.'s albums as well as for other groups and singers like NRG and former labelmate Fly to the Sky.

On February 4, 2020, it was confirmed that Kangta is in a relationship with actress Jung Yu-mi.

== Group projects ==
=== S (Supreme) ===
After planning for years, Kangta worked with his celebrity friends Shin Hye-sung from Shinhwa and Lee Ji-hoon to form the project group named 'S', an initialism for 'Supreme'. They released their first solo project album called Fr. In. Cl. (short for 'Friends in Classic'; 2003). They have won several awards since then. Their title track, "I Swear" was written, composed, and arranged by Kangta while Shin wrote the English lyrics.

On 14 October 2014, it was announced that group 'S' would be making a comeback after over a decade with a new mini-album titled Autumn Breeze, scheduled to be released on October 27. SM Entertainment stated that "Kangta wrote and produced all the songs on the upcoming album. Kangta's unique music style and the trio's harmonious voices will create beautiful ballads that will satisfy the fans". On October 18, the group performed their new song "Without You" (하고 싶은 거 다) at SM Entertainment's agency-wide concert SM Town in Shanghai. The music video for the song was released on October 24, starring Yuri of Girls' Generation. The group was slated to be on Immortal Songs 2 on November 3 as part of their promotions.

=== Kangta & Vanness ===
Early 2006, Kangta collaborated with Vanness Wu of F4 from Taiwan, and formed Kangta & Vanness. Their debut was in Thailand ending the ceremony for the 2006 MTV Asia Awards. They released their single "Scandal" and promoted their single in Asia. "Scandal" was a success over Asia and a repackaged version was released in mid-July. On September 12, they held a showcase in Malaysia, Berjaya Times Square.

On Arirang TV's talk show Heart to Heart, Kangta announced that he would be entering the Army in early 2008, during which activities were put on hold.

== Music discography ==
=== Studio albums ===
Title	Album details	Peak chart positions	Sales
Title	Album details	KOR	Sales
Polaris	Released: August 19, 2001; Label: SM Entertainment; Formats: CD, digital download	—N/a (Note: According to the Music Industry Association of Korea (MIAK), which stopped compiling data after 2008, Polaris peaked at number one on the monthly chart of August 2001.)	KOR: 492,843
Pine Tree	Released: August 21, 2002; Label: SM Entertainment; Formats: CD, digital download	—N/a (Note: According to the Music Industry Association of Korea (MIAK), which stopped compiling data after 2008, Pine Tree peaked at number one on the monthly chart of August 2002.)	KOR: 264,463
Persona	Released: March 4, 2005; Label: SM Entertainment; Formats: CD, digital download	—N/a (Note: According to the Music Industry Association of Korea (MIAK), which stopped compiling data after 2008, Persona peaked at number three on the monthly chart of March 2005.)	KOR: 50,060
Eyes on You	Released: September 7, 2022; Label: SM Entertainment; Formats: CD, digital download	18	KOR: 6,629

=== Compilation albums ===
Title	Album details
Kangta & Best	Released: October 3, 2006; Label: SM Entertainment; Formats: CD, digital download

=== Live albums ===
Title	Album details
1st Concert Pinetree: 20020824 Live	Released: March 28, 2003; Label: SM Entertainment; Formats: CD, digital download

=== Extended plays ===
Title	Details	Peak chart positions	Sales
Title	Details	KOR	Sales
Korean
Eternity	Released: March 12, 2008; Label: SM Entertainment; Formats: CD, digital download	—N/a (Note: According to the Music Industry Association of Korea (MIAK), which stopped compiling data after 2008, Eternity peaked at number five on the monthly chart of March 2008.)	KOR: 12,301
'Home' Chapter 1	Released: November 3, 2016; Label: SM Entertainment; Formats: CD, digital download	13	KOR: 3,172
Chinese
Breaka Shaka	Released: September 14, 2010; Label: SM Entertainment, Avex Taiwan; Formats: CD, digital download	—N/a	—N/a

=== Singles ===
==== As lead artist ====
Title	Year	Album
Korean
"Polaris" (북극성)	2001	Polaris
"Memories" (사랑은 기억보다)	2002	Pine Tree
"Persona" (가면)	2004	Persona
"Eternity" (어느날 가슴이 말했다)	2008	Eternity
"Diner" (단골식당)	2016	'Home' Chapter 1
"Cough Syrup" (감기약)	2021	Cough Syrup
"Freezing"	2021	Eyes On You
"Free to Fly 2021" (자유롭게 날 수 있도록 2021)	2021	Free to Fly 2021
"Christmas in July" (7월의 크리스마스)	2021	Eyes On You
"Maybe" (아마)	2021	Eyes On You
"Slow Dance"	2022	Eyes On You
"Eyes on You" (야경)	2022	Eyes On You
Chinese
"Breaka Shaka"	2010	Breaka Shaka

==== As featured artist ====
Title	Year	Album
"I Want" (Fly to the Sky featuring Kangta and BoA)	2001	The Promise
"The Poem" (Song Kwang-sik featuring Kangta)	2001	Dream of Heaven
"Confession" (hangul 고백)" (Chu Ga-yeoul featuring Kangta)	2007	Vol. 2 There's So Much I Want to Say Promise
"7989" (Taeyeon featuring Kangta)	2007	Girls' Generation

=== Soundtrack appearances ===
Title	Year	Album
"너의 꿈 찾아"	2001	Atlantis: The Lost Empire soundtrack
"Breath"	2001	Atlantis: The Lost Empire soundtrack
"Seom"	2002	Resurrection of the Little Match Girl soundtrack
"Breath"(in S)	2005	April Snow soundtrack
"Still My Heart"	2007	Dear My Love soundtrack
"Perguntas"	2007	Air City soundtrack
"Arrow"	2011	Athena soundtrack
"Magic" (with Shin Seung-hoon, Baek Ji-young and Gil)	2012	The Voice of Korea
"Dear My Family" (with SMTown artists)	2012	I Am soundtrack
"미안합니다(Prod. By Muzie, Cho Jung Chi)" (with Hanhae)	2016	The birth of the song, TRACK 7
"Theme Of Prontera"	2017	The Memory Of Ragnarok soundtrack
"I Swear" (with Kim Jaeho, Yoon Bora, Cho Hyunrang)	2017	Fantastic Duo2 Part.15
"Polaris" (with Cho Hyunrang)	2017	Fantastic Duo2 Part.15

=== Other appearances ===
List of SMTOWN and SM Station
Title	Year	Album
"Angel Eyes" (with SMTown artists)	2001	Christmas Winter Vacation in SMTown.com – Angel Eyes
"White"	2001	Christmas Winter Vacation in SMTown.com – Angel Eyes
"The First Noel"	2001	Christmas Winter Vacation in SMTown.com – Angel Eyes
"Summer Vacation" (with SMTown artists)	2002	02 SUMMER VACATION IN SMTOWN.com
"Blue"	2002	02 SUMMER VACATION IN SMTOWN.com
"여름날의 추억"	2002	02 SUMMER VACATION IN SMTOWN.com
"My Angel My Light (with SMTown artists)"	2002	2002 Winter Vacation in SMTown.com – My Angel My Light
"보내는 글"	2002	2002 Winter Vacation in SMTown.com – My Angel My Light
"Silver Bell" (with Hyesung and Isak N Jiyeon)	2002	2002 Winter Vacation in SMTown.com – My Angel My Light
"Hello! Summer!" (with SMTown artists)	2003	2003 Summer Vacation in SMTown.com
"연가"	2003	2003 Summer Vacation in SMTown.com
"그림으로 떠나는여행" (with Dana, Jung Ji-hoon(Black Beat), Jang Jin-young(Black Beat), Jiyeon(Isak N Jiyeon)	2003	2003 Summer Vacation in SMTown.com
"두 번째 겨울 (Snowflake) (with SMTown artists)"	2003	2003 Winter Vacation in SMTown.com
"The Christmas Song"	2003	2003 Winter Vacation in SMTown.com
"Hot Mail (여름편지) (with SMTown artists)"	2004	2004 Summer Vacation in SMTown.com
"미쳐가나봐"	2004	2004 Summer Vacation in SMTown.com
"Just One" (with Moon Hee Jun and Isak N Jiyeon)	2004	2004 Summer Vacation in SMTown.com
"태양은 가득히" (with SMTown artists)	2006	2006 Summer SMTown
"Summer Night Love" (한 여름밤의 고백)	2006	2006 Summer SMTown
"Snow Dream" (with SMTown artists)	2006	2006 Winter SMTown – Snow Dream
"White Christmas"	2006	2006 Winter SMTown – Snow Dream
"여행을 떠나요" (with SMTown artists)	2007	2007 Summer SMTown
"Last Year Summer Night Story" (지난 여름밤의 이 야기)	2007	2007 Summer SMTown
"Only Love" (사랑 하나죠)	2007	2007 Winter SMTown – Only Love
"Winter Wonderland"	2007	2007 Winter SMTown – Only Love
"For The First Time"	2011	2011 Winter SMTown – The Warmest Gift
"Doll" (with Wendy, Seulgi)	2007	Doll - SM Station
"Dear My Family (Studio Ver.)" (with SMTown artists)	2007	Dear My Family - SM Station
"Dear My Family (Live Concert Ver.)" (with SMTown artists)	2007	Dear My Family - SM Station
"빛 (Hope from KWANGYA)" (with SMTown artists)	2021	2021 Winter SM Town: SMCU Express
"The Cure" (with BoA, U-Know, Leeteuk, Taeyeon, Onew, Suho, Irene, Taeyong, Mark, Kun, Karina)	2022	2022 Winter SM Town: SMCU Palace
"Happier" (with Yesung, Suho, Tae-il, Renjun)	2022	2022 Winter SM Town: SMCU Palace
"When I Close My Eyes" (with Lee A-reum)	2023	When I Close My Eyes - SM Station
"Thank You" (with SMTown artists)	2025	2025 SM Town: The Culture, the Future
"Just a Feeling"	2025	2025 SM Town: The Culture, the Future

=== Music videos ===
Title	Year	Director
Korean
"Polaris"	2001	—N/a
"Confession"	2002	—N/a
"Memories"	2002	—N/a
"Propose"	2002	—N/a
"Persona"	2005	Lee Sang-kyu
"Eternity"	2008	—N/a
"Diner"	2016	—N/a
"Cough Syrup"	2021	—N/a
"Freezing"	2021	—N/a
"Free To Fly 2021"	2021	—N/a
"Christmas in July"	2021	—N/a
"Slow Dance"	2022	—N/a
"Eyes On You"	2022	—N/a
"Love Song"	2022	—N/a
"When I Close My Eyes"	2023	—N/a
Chinese
"Breaka Shaka"	2010	—N/a

== Production and songwriting discography ==
=== Production credits ===
- Polaris (2001)
- Pine Tree (2002)
- Fr. In. Cl. by S (2003)
- Persona (2005)
- Scandal by Kangta & Vanness (2006)
- Eternity (2008)
- Arrow soundtrack (2011)
- That Winter, the Wind Blows soundtrack (2013)
- Rewind by Zhoumi (2014)
- Autumn Breeze by S (2014)
- Cause You by Yeong-jun & Lee Ye-joon (2022)
- Shiny day by Tony Ahn (2023)

=== Songwriting and composing credits ===
==== 1990s ====
Year	Album	Artist	Song	Lyrics		Music		Notes
Year	Album	Artist	Song	Credited	With	Credited	With	Notes
1998	Resurrection	H.O.T.	"Hope"	Yes	—	Yes	—	
1998	Resurrection	H.O.T.	"The Promise of H.O.T."	Yes	Yoo Young-jin	No	—	
1998	Resurrection	H.O.T.	"Techno Love"	Yes	Tony Ahn	Yes	—	
1998	Resurrection	H.O.T.	"Wedding X-mas"	Yes	—	Yes	—	
1999	I Yah!	H.O.T.	"My Girl"	Yes	—	Yes	—	
1999	I Yah!	H.O.T.	"Celebrate"	Yes	—	Yes	—	
1999	I Yah!	H.O.T.	"It's Been Raining Since You Left Me"	Yes	—	Yes	—	
1999	I Yah!	H.O.T.	"Together, Forever"	Yes	—	Yes	—	
1999	Christmas in SMTown.com	SM Town	"Jingle Bell"	Yes	—	Yes	—	
1999	Christmas in SMTown.com	SM Town	"Graduation"	Yes	—	Yes	—	
1999	Christmas in SMTown.com	SM Town	"Together, Forever"	Yes	—	Yes	—	
1999	Christmas in SMTown.com	SM Town	"Wedding X-mas"	Yes	—	Yes	—	
1999	Christmas in SMTown.com	SM Town	"A Song For Love"	Yes	—	Yes	—	
1999	Fly to the Sky	Fly to the Sky	"In My Dream"	Yes	—	Yes	—	
1999	Fly to the Sky	Fly to the Sky	"A Song For Love"	Yes	—	Yes	—	

==== 2000s ====
Year	Album	Artist	Song	Lyrics		Music		Notes
Year	Album	Artist	Song	Credited	With	Credited	With	Notes
2000	Eternity Friend	Lee Ji-hoon	"For You......"	Yes	—	Yes	—	
2000	Eternity Friend	Lee Ji-hoon	"Eternity Friend"	Yes	—	Yes	—	
2000	Age Of Peace soundtrack	H.O.T.	"The Best"	Yes	—	Yes	—	
2000	Age Of Peace soundtrack	H.O.T.	"TTTrack #1 (Techno Time Track #1)"	No	—	Yes	—	
2000	Age Of Peace soundtrack	H.O.T.	"TTTrack #2 (Techno Time Track #2)"	No	—	Yes	—	
2000	Outside Castle	H.O.T.	"Delight"	Yes	—	Yes	—	
2000	Outside Castle	H.O.T.	"We Can Do It!"	Yes	—	Yes	—	
2000	Outside Castle	H.O.T.	"My Mother"	No	—	Yes	Jang Woo-hyuk	
2000	Outside Castle	H.O.T.	"Pray for You"	Yes	—	Yes	—	
2000	Outside Castle	H.O.T.	"Goodbye For The Last"	No	—	Yes	Jang Woo-hyuk	
2000	Outside Castle	H.O.T.	"Illusion"	Yes	—	Yes	—	
2000	Outside Castle	H.O.T.	"Always My Love"	Yes	—	Yes	—	
2000	Winter Vacation In SM Town.com	SM Town	"Silver Bell"	Yes	a foreign folk song	Yes	—	
2001	Special With...	Lee Ji-hoon	"Doll"	Yes	—	Yes	—	
2001	Special With...	Lee Ji-hoon	"My Romance"	Yes	—	Yes	—	
2001	The Promise	Fly to the Sky	"I Want"	Yes	Brian Joo	Yes	—	
2001	The Promise	Fly to the Sky	"Shy Love"	Yes	Brian Joo	Yes	—	
2001	Sorrow (悲)	NRG	"Sorrow (悲)"	Yes	—	Yes	—	
2001	Hey, Come On!	Shinhwa	"I Swear..."	No	—	Yes	—	
2001	Atlantis: The Lost Empire soundtrack	Kangta	"Faith"	Yes	—	Yes	—	
2001	Polaris	Kangta	"Polaris"	Yes	—N/a	Yes	—	
2001	Polaris	Kangta	"My Life"	Yes	—	Yes	—	
2001	Polaris	Kangta	"In Your Eyes"	Yes	—	No	—	
2001	Polaris	Kangta	"Still"	Yes	—	Yes	—	
2001	Polaris	Kangta	"Last Summer Night"	Yes	—	Yes	—	
2001	Polaris	Kangta	"Blue Moon"	Yes	—	No	—	
2001	Polaris	Kangta	"Polaris" instrumental	No	—	Yes	—	
2001	Dana	Dana	"Pretty..."	Yes	—	Yes	—	
2001	Winter vacation in SMTOWN.com - Angel eyes	SM Town	"White"	Yes	—	Yes	—	
2001	Winter vacation in SMTOWN.com - Angel eyes	SM Town	"The First Noel"	Yes	—	Yes	—	
2002	Pine Tree	Kangta	"Happy Happy"	Yes	Lee Yoon-jae	No	—	
2002	Pine Tree	Kangta	"Memories"	Yes	—	Yes	—	
2002	Pine Tree	Kangta	"Propose"	Yes	—	Yes	—	
2002	Pine Tree	Kangta	"Summer"	Yes	—	No	—	
2002	Pine Tree	Kangta	"The Best"	Yes	—	Yes	—	
2002	Pine Tree	Kangta	"Autumn"	Yes	—	No	—	
2002	Pine Tree	Kangta	"Memories#2"	Yes	—	Yes	—	
2002	Pine Tree	Kangta	"Flower"	Yes	—	Yes	—	
2002	Pine Tree	Kangta	"2032 in Cuba"	Yes	Yoon Hyo-sang	No	—	
2002	Pine Tree	Kangta	"Nocturne"	Yes	—	Yes	—	
2002	Pine Tree	Kangta	"One Snowing Day"	Yes	—	Yes	Song Kwang-sik	
2002	Pine Tree	Kangta	"Pine Tree"	Yes	—	Yes	—	
2002	No.1	BoA	"Waiting"	Yes	—	No	—	
2002	No.1	BoA	"Beat It"	Yes	—	No	—	
2003	Fr. in. Cl	S	"I Swear"	Yes	Shin Hye-sung	Yes	—	
2003	Fr. in. Cl	S	"Love Is..."	Yes	—	Yes	—	
2003	Fr. in. Cl	S	"Just One Moment"	Yes	Eric Mun	Yes	—	
2003	Fr. in. Cl	S	"Tears Of The Moon"	Yes	—	Yes	—	
2003	Fr. in. Cl	S	"I Was..."	Yes	—	Yes	—	
2003	Fr. in. Cl	S	"Sentimental"	Yes	—	Yes	—	
2003	Double	BoA	"Always"	Yes	—	Yes	—	
2004	NR6G	NRG	"Shoulder To Shoulder"	Yes	—	Yes	—	
2005	Persona	Kangta	"Persona"	Yes	—	Yes	—	
2005	Persona	Kangta	"Illusion"	Yes	—	Yes	—	
2005	Persona	Kangta	"Agape"	Yes	—	Yes	—	
2005	Persona	Kangta	"Paralysis"	Yes	—	Yes	—	
2005	Persona	Kangta	"Just One Day"	Yes	—	Yes	—	
2005	Persona	Kangta	"Blue Snow"	Yes	—	No	—	
2005	Persona	Kangta	"Always"	Yes	—	No	—	
2005	Persona	Kangta	"Prayer"	Yes	—	No	—	
2005	April Snow soundtrack	S	"Breath"	Yes	—	Yes	—	
2006	Scandal	Kangta & Vanness	"127 Days"	Yes	—	Yes	—	
2006	Scandal	Kangta & Vanness	"One Day"	Yes	—	Yes	—	
2007	Girls' Generation	Kangta and Taeyeon	"7989"	Yes	—	Yes	—	
2007	Eternity	Kangta	"Eternity"	Yes	—	Yes	—	
2007	Eternity	Kangta	"7989"	Yes	—	Yes	—	

==== 2010s ====
Year	Album	Artist	Song	Lyrics		Music		Notes
Year	Album	Artist	Song	Credited	With	Credited	With	Notes
2010	Breaka Shaka	Kangta	"Remember"	Yes	—	Yes	—	
2010	Breaka Shaka	Kangta	"Habit"	Yes	—	Yes	—	
2011	Athena soundtrack	Kangta	"Arrow"	Yes	—	Yes	—	
2013	That Winter, the Wind Blows soundtrack	Yesung	"Gray Paper"	Yes	—	Yes	—	
2013	That Winter, the Wind Blows soundtrack	Taeyeon	"Only One"	Yes	—	Yes	—	
2014	Can You Here Me	Ji Se Hee	"Can You Here Me"	Yes	—	Yes	—	
2014	Once Again #2	Shin Hye-sung&Im Chang-jung	"Doll"	Yes	—	Yes	—	
2014	Autumn Breeze	S	"Without You"	Yes	—	Yes	—	
2014	Autumn Breeze	S	"One Last Memory"	Yes	—	Yes	—	
2014	Autumn Breeze	S	"Utopia"	Yes	Song Kwang-sik	Yes	Song Kwang-sik	
2014	Autumn Breeze	S	"One Fine Day"	Yes	—	Yes	—	
2014	Autumn Breeze	S	"Secret Letter"	Yes	—	Yes	—	
2016	'Home' Chapter 1	Kangta	"Diner"	Yes	—	Yes	—	
2017	Doll	Kangta&Wendy&Seulgi	"Doll"	Yes	—	Yes	—	
2019	Hope	Lee Jin-ah	"Hope"	Yes	-	Yes	—	

==== 2020s ====
Year	Album	Artist	Song	Lyrics		Music		Notes
Year	Album	Artist	Song	Credited	With	Credited	With	Notes
2021	Rewind: Blossom	Baekhyun&Doyoung	"Doll"	Yes	—	Yes	—	
2021	Christmas in July	Kangta	"Memories of Summer 2021"	Yes	—	Yes	—	
2021	2021 Winter SM Town: SMCU Express	SM Town	"The Promise of H.O.T. (Jazz Ver.)"	Yes	Yoo Young-jin	No	-	
2021	2021 Winter SM Town: SMCU Express	SM Town	"Hope from KWANGYA"	Yes	—	Yes	—	
2022	Cause You	Yeong-jun & Lee Ye-joon	"Cause You"	Yes	Yeong-jun	Yes	Yeong-jun	
2022	Re-born Project	Ben	"Waiting.."	Yes	-	Yes	-	
2022	Eyes on You	Kangta	"Persona 2022"	Yes	—	Yes	—	
2023	Pine Tree	Lee Woo	"Pine Tree"	Yes	—	Yes	—	
2023	Shiny Day	Tony Ahn	"Shiny Day"	Yes	—	Yes	—	
2023	—	Kim Woojin	"Camellia"	No	—	Yes	Kyle Lo, Petra	
2024	Glow	Big O!cean	"Glow"	Yes	Mac Curly	Yes	—	
2024	Youth	Doyoung	"Warmth"	No	—	Yes	Dawnon, KimWook, Jae Do-gi, HYUN, NONE, Sondia	
2024	I Like The Way	Kim Woojin	"Hold"	Yes	Kim Woojin	Yes	eldon	
2024	Start Up! (Prod. KANGTA)	SOIONA	"Start Up! (Prod. KANGTA)"	Yes	-	Yes	-	
2024	LOVESTRUCK SISTERS Episode 8 soundtrack	Mytro	"Life Goes On"	No	-	Yes	Hickee, WONJUN	
2024	Ordinary Grace	Baek Ji-young	"Indeed, It Was Love"	No	-	Yes	Hickee, Klozer	

== Tours and concerts ==
- KANGTA 1st Concert: Pinetree (2002)
- KANGTA Beijing Concert (2005)
- KANGTA & VANNESS SCANDAL in Beijing (2006)
- KANGTA 1st JAPAN CONCERT 2007 (2007)
- 2008 KANGTA LIVE CONCERT "Eternity" (2008)
- KANGTA Asia Tour 2010 IN Beijing (2010)
- The Agit: Coming Home (2016)

== Filmography ==
=== Film ===
Year	Title	Role	Notes/Ref.
2000	Age Of Peace	Himself	
2002	Emergency Act 19	Himself	
2002	Resurrection of the Little Match Girl	Special Guest Star	
2012	I AM.	Himself	Documentary of SMTown in New York
2012	Secret Garden	Oscar	Chinese-language remake of the 2010 South Korean drama.
2015	SMTown The Stage	Himself	Documentary film of SM Town
2016	Mad Monk Ji Gong	TBA	

=== Television dramas ===
Year	Title	Role	Notes
2002	Man And Women-Happy Birthday	Dohyun	Lead role
2005	Magic Touch of Fate	Jin Xiu (金修)	Main role
2005	Loveholic	Seo Kang Wook	Lead role
2007	Love In The City 2	Zhang Wei Qi	Lead role
2007	It's a Celebration for the Girls of Jeongga	An Chil-hyun	Lead role
2011	Pepper and Kimchi	Kang Woo-hyuk	Lead role
2011	Di Jin	Ling Xuan	Lead role
2012	Happy Ending	Goo Seung Jae	Supporting role
2016	Circle of Friends		
2017	Tri-Path Journey		

=== TV show ===
Year	Title	Role	Notes/Ref.
2012–2013	The Voice of Korea	Judges	Seasons 1 and 2, did not return for season 3
2018	Song One	MC	Ep 1–6
2019	Super Hearer	Hearer	Ep 1–8

=== Radio ===
Year	Title	Role	Note
2002	KBS 2FM Kangta's Freedom Declaration	DJ	Solo DJ
2002 – 2003	KBS 2FM Kangta, Shin Hye-sung's Freedom Declaration	DJ	Double DJ
2016–2018	MBC Starry Night	DJ	Solo DJ

== Awards and nominations ==
Name of the award ceremony, year presented, category, nominee of the award, and the result of the nomination
Award ceremony	Year	Category	Nominee / work	Result	Ref.
MTV Asia Awards	2002	Favorite Artist - Korea	"Polaris"	Won	
KMTV Korean Music Awards	2002	Bonsang	"Polaris"	Won	
KMTV Korean Music Awards	2003	Bonsang	"I Swear" (S)	Won	
Mnet Asian Music Awards	2001	Best Male Artist	"Polaris"	Won	
Mnet Asian Music Awards	2001	Best Ballad Performance	"Polaris"	Nominated	
Mnet Asian Music Awards	2002	Best Male Artist	"Memories"	Nominated	
Mnet Asian Music Awards	2002	Best Ballad Performance	"Memories"	Nominated	
Mnet Asian Music Awards	2005	Best R&B Performance	"Persona"	Nominated	
Mnet Asian Music Awards	2005	Overseas Viewers' Award	"Mask"	Won	
Seoul Music Awards	2001	Bonsang	"Polaris"	Won	
Seoul Music Awards	2006	K-wave Special Award	"Kangta & Vanness"	Won	
Golden Disc Awards	2001	Bonsang	"Polaris"	Won	
Golden Disc Awards	2002	Bonsang	"Memories"	Won	
Golden Disc Awards	2003	Popularity Award	"S"	Won	
SBS Gayo Daejeon	2001	Bonsang	"Polaris"	Won	
SBS Gayo Daejeon	2001	Most Popular Award	"Polaris"	Won	
SBS Gayo Daejeon	2002	Bonsang	"Memories"	Won	
SBS Gayo Daejeon	2003	Bonsang	"I Swear" (S)	Won	
KBS Gayo Daesang	2001	Bonsang	"Polaris"	Won	
KBS Gayo Daesang	2002	Bonsang	"Memories"	Won	
KBS Gayo Daesang	2003	Popularity Award	"I Swear" (S)	Won	
MBC Top 10 Singer's Song Festival	2001	Bonsang	"Polaris"	Won	
MBC Top 10 Singer's Song Festival	2002	Bonsang	"Memories"	Won	
KBS Entertainment Awards	2003	Radio DJ of the Year	Kangta, Shin Hye-sung's Freedom Declaration	Won	
MBC Entertainment Awards	2016	Radio DJ Rookie Award	Starry Night	Won	
