= S (South Korean band) =

South Korean musical group

- Also known as: Group S; Supreme
- Origin: Seoul, South Korea
- Genres: K-pop; R&B
- Years active: 2003; 2014
- Label: SM Entertainment
- Past members: Kangta; Lee Ji Hoon; Shin Hye Sung

S (에스) is a South Korean project group consisting of three members: Kangta, Lee Ji-hoon and Shin Hye-sung. The group debuted in 2003, under the SM Entertainment label. After 11 years, they released and promoted another mini-album in 2014.

== History ==
In 2003, S released their first album Fr.In.Cl, which stands for Friends in Classic. In 2014, after more than a decade in hiatus, the group released their second mini-album Autumn Breeze on October 27. As member Kangta wrote and produced the songs, it was said that his "unique music style and the trio's harmonious voices will create beautiful ballads". On October 18, the group performed their title track "Without You (하고 싶은 거 다)" for the first time at SM Entertainment's agency-wide concert SM Town in Shanghai. The music video for the song was released on October 24, starring Kwon Yuri of Girls' Generation. The group continued to promote the song on various South Korean music programs, such as on Immortal Songs 2 on November 3.

== Band members ==
- Kangta
- Shin Hye-sung
- Lee Ji-hoon

== Discography ==
=== Studio albums ===
| Album | Information | Track listing |
|---|---|---|
| 1st | Fr. in. Cl: Release date: September 24, 2003; Label: SM Entertainment | Track listing: 1. I swear 2. 사랑니(Love Is); 3. 미쳤었죠(Just One Moment); 4. I Believe; 5. 달이 꾸는 꿈(Tears Of The Moon); 6. 몰랐죠(Stay); 7. 왜..(I Was); 8. Never Knew; 9. 사랑밖에 모르죠(Love Is What I Need); 10. Sentimental; 11. Prayer; 12. Streaming TRAX 에메랄드(Emerald) |

=== EP ===
| Album # | Information | Track listing |
|---|---|---|
| 1st | Autumn Breeze: Released: October 27, 2014; Released Under: SM Entertainment | Track listing: 1. 하고 싶은 거 다 (Without You); 2. 내려놓기 (One Last Memory); 3. 세상 속으로 (Utopia); 4. 이런 어느 날 (One Fine Day); 5. Secret Letter |

== Concert tours ==
=== SMTown ===
- 2014: SM Town Live World Tour IV

== Awards and nominations ==
| Year | Award-Giving Body | Category | Work | Result |
|---|---|---|---|---|
| 2003 | Mnet Asian Music Awards | Best Male Group | "I Swear" | Nominated |
| 2003 | KBS Gayo Daesang | Bonsang | "I Swear" | Won |
| 2003 | SBS Gayo Daejeon | Bonsang | "I Swear" | Won |
| 2003 | Golden Disc Awards | Popularity Award | | Won |
| 2003 | KMTV Music Awards | Bonsang | "I Swear" | Won |
