= SM Town =

Musical ensemble of SM Entertainment

- Origin: Seoul, South Korea
- Genres: Pop; R&B; electropop; rock; EDM; hip-hop
- Years active: 1999–present
- Label: SM
- Members: Kangta; TVXQ; Super Junior; Girls' Generation; Shinee; Exo; Red Velvet; NCT; Aespa; Riize; Naevis; Hearts2Hearts; XngHan&Xoul
- Past members: H.O.T.; S.E.S.; Shinhwa; Fly to the Sky; M.I.L.K.; Shinvi; Black Beat; Isak N Jiyeon; TRAX; The Grace; f(x); BoA; Lucas
- Website: smtown.com

SM Town (stylized in all caps as SMTOWN) is a musical collective for the recording artists under South Korean entertainment company SM Entertainment.

SM Town artists have performed at the annual SM Town Live world tours since the SM Town Live '08 Asia tour in 2008. As of 2014, the SM Town Live concert series had cumulatively attracted over 1 million audience members.

== Artists ==
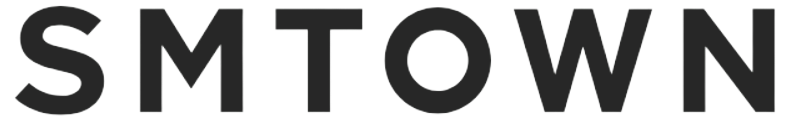
Logo

== Discography ==
=== Projects ===
- 2015–19: The Agit - Concert Series
- 2016–present: SM Station

=== Studio albums ===
List of studio albums, showing selected details, selected chart positions, and sales figures
Title	Details	Peak chart position				Sales	Certifications
Title	Details	KOR Circle	KOR RIAK	JPN Oricon	JPN Hot	Sales	Certifications
Christmas in SMTown.com	Released: December 1, 1999; Label: SM, Wawa; Formats: CD, digital download, streaming	(Note: Gaon Music Chart was launched on February 23, 2010.)	2	—	(Note: Billboard Japan Hot Albums was launched on June 4, 2015.)	KOR: 300,000	(Note: In April 2018, Gaon Music Chart introduced music recording certifications for albums, downloads, and streamings that were released and licensed in Korea starting from January 2018 onward.)
Winter Vacation in SMTown.com	Released: December 8, 2000; Label: SM; Formats: CD, digital download, streaming	(Note: Gaon Music Chart was launched on February 23, 2010.)	—	—	(Note: Billboard Japan Hot Albums was launched on June 4, 2015.)	—N/a	(Note: In April 2018, Gaon Music Chart introduced music recording certifications for albums, downloads, and streamings that were released and licensed in Korea starting from January 2018 onward.)
Winter Vacation in SMTown.com – Angel Eyes	Released: December 4, 2001; Label: SM; Formats: CD, digital download, streaming	(Note: Gaon Music Chart was launched on February 23, 2010.)	—	—	(Note: Billboard Japan Hot Albums was launched on June 4, 2015.)	—N/a	(Note: In April 2018, Gaon Music Chart introduced music recording certifications for albums, downloads, and streamings that were released and licensed in Korea starting from January 2018 onward.)
Summer Vacation in SMTown.com	Released: June 10, 2002; Label: SM, IKPOP; Formats: CD, digital download, streaming	(Note: Gaon Music Chart was launched on February 23, 2010.)	1	—	(Note: Billboard Japan Hot Albums was launched on June 4, 2015.)	KOR: 201,052	(Note: In April 2018, Gaon Music Chart introduced music recording certifications for albums, downloads, and streamings that were released and licensed in Korea starting from January 2018 onward.)
2002 Winter Vacation in SMTown.com	Released: December 6, 2002; Label: SM; Formats: CD, digital download, streaming	(Note: Gaon Music Chart was launched on February 23, 2010.)	8	—	(Note: Billboard Japan Hot Albums was launched on June 4, 2015.)	KOR: 69,278	(Note: In April 2018, Gaon Music Chart introduced music recording certifications for albums, downloads, and streamings that were released and licensed in Korea starting from January 2018 onward.)
2003 Summer Vacation in SMTown.com	Released: June 18, 2003; Label: SM; Formats: CD, digital download, streaming	(Note: Gaon Music Chart was launched on February 23, 2010.)	6	—	(Note: Billboard Japan Hot Albums was launched on June 4, 2015.)	KOR: 46,387	(Note: In April 2018, Gaon Music Chart introduced music recording certifications for albums, downloads, and streamings that were released and licensed in Korea starting from January 2018 onward.)
2003 Winter Vacation in SMTown.com	Released: December 8, 2003; Label: SM; Formats: CD, digital download, streaming	(Note: Gaon Music Chart was launched on February 23, 2010.)	10	—	(Note: Billboard Japan Hot Albums was launched on June 4, 2015.)	KOR: 35,392	(Note: In April 2018, Gaon Music Chart introduced music recording certifications for albums, downloads, and streamings that were released and licensed in Korea starting from January 2018 onward.)
04 Summer Vacation In SMTown.com	Released: July 2, 2004; Label: SM; Formats: CD, digital download, streaming	(Note: Gaon Music Chart was launched on February 23, 2010.)	8	—	(Note: Billboard Japan Hot Albums was launched on June 4, 2015.)	KOR: 41,118	(Note: In April 2018, Gaon Music Chart introduced music recording certifications for albums, downloads, and streamings that were released and licensed in Korea starting from January 2018 onward.)
2006 Summer SM Town	Released: June 20, 2006; Label: SM; Formats: CD, digital download, streaming	(Note: Gaon Music Chart was launched on February 23, 2010.)	4	—	(Note: Billboard Japan Hot Albums was launched on June 4, 2015.)	KOR: 40,829	(Note: In April 2018, Gaon Music Chart introduced music recording certifications for albums, downloads, and streamings that were released and licensed in Korea starting from January 2018 onward.)
06 Winter SM Town	Released: December 12, 2006; Label: SM; Formats: CD, digital download, streaming	(Note: Gaon Music Chart was launched on February 23, 2010.)	1	—	(Note: Billboard Japan Hot Albums was launched on June 4, 2015.)	KOR: 35,214	(Note: In April 2018, Gaon Music Chart introduced music recording certifications for albums, downloads, and streamings that were released and licensed in Korea starting from January 2018 onward.)
2007 Summer SM Town	Released: July 5, 2007; Label: SM; Formats: CD, digital download, streaming	(Note: Gaon Music Chart was launched on February 23, 2010.)	2	—	(Note: Billboard Japan Hot Albums was launched on June 4, 2015.)	KOR: 35,543	(Note: In April 2018, Gaon Music Chart introduced music recording certifications for albums, downloads, and streamings that were released and licensed in Korea starting from January 2018 onward.)
07 Winter SM Town	Released: December 10, 2007; Label: SM, IPLE; Formats: CD, digital download, streaming	(Note: Gaon Music Chart was launched on February 23, 2010.)	4	—	(Note: Billboard Japan Hot Albums was launched on June 4, 2015.)	KOR: 22,856	(Note: In April 2018, Gaon Music Chart introduced music recording certifications for albums, downloads, and streamings that were released and licensed in Korea starting from January 2018 onward.)
2011 SM Town Winter 'The Warmest Gift'	Released: December 13, 2011; Label: SM, KMP; Formats: CD, digital download, streaming	1	(Note: The Music Industry Association of Korea stopped compiling data in the second half of 2008.)	36	(Note: Billboard Japan Hot Albums was launched on June 4, 2015.)	KOR: 45,581	(Note: In April 2018, Gaon Music Chart introduced music recording certifications for albums, downloads, and streamings that were released and licensed in Korea starting from January 2018 onward.)
2021 Winter SM Town: SMCU Express	Released: December 27, 2021; Label: SM, Dreamus; Formats: CD, digital download, streaming	2	(Note: The Music Industry Association of Korea stopped compiling data in the second half of 2008.)	14	30	KOR: 628,781	KMCA: 2× Platinum
2022 Winter SM Town: SMCU Palace	Released: December 26, 2022; Label: SM, Dreamus; Formats: CD, digital download, streaming	4	(Note: The Music Industry Association of Korea stopped compiling data in the second half of 2008.)	25	46	KOR: 544,372	KMCA: Platinum
2025 SM Town: The Culture, the Future	Released: February 14, 2025; Label: SM, Kakao; Formats: CD, digital download, streaming	4	(Note: The Music Industry Association of Korea stopped compiling data in the second half of 2008.)	42	—	KOR: 167,785; JPN: 750	
"—" denotes a recording that did not chart or was not released in that territory

=== Compilation albums ===
List of compilation albums, showing selected details, selected chart positions, and sales figures
Title	Details	Peak chart position	Sales
Title	Details	KOR	Sales
SM Best Album 3	Released: August 10, 2012; Label: SM, KMP; Formats: CD, digital download, streaming	4	KOR: 16,686

=== Single albums ===
List of single albums, showing selected details, selected chart positions, and sales figures
Title	Details	Ref.
09 Summer SM Town	Released: August 14, 2009; Label: SM; Formats: CD, digital download, streaming	
PYL Younique Volume 1	Released: December 2012; Label: SM; Formats: CD	

=== Single ===
Year	Title	Album	Notes
2012	"Dear My Family (2012 version)"	I AM. Original Film Soundtrack	Theme song for I AM.
2017	"Dear My Family (2017 version)"	SM Station Season 2	Tribute single to the late Shinee member Jonghyun
2019	"This is Your Day (for every child, UNICEF)"	SM Station X 4 LOVEs for Winter	Collaboration single with UNICEF

== Concerts ==
=== Concert tours ===
- SM Town Live '08 (2008–09)
- SM Town Live '09 (2009; canceled)
- SM Town Live '10 World Tour (2010–11)
- SM Town Live World Tour III (2012–13)
- SM Town Live World Tour IV (2014–15)
- SM Town Live Tour V in Japan (2016)
- SM Town Live World Tour VI (2017–18)
- SM Town Live 2022: SMCU Express (2022)
- SM Town Live 2023: SMCU Palace (2023–2024)
- SM Town Live 2025: The Culture, the Future (2025–2026)

=== Music festivals ===
- SM Smile Concert China (2002)
- SM Smile Concert (2003)
- SM Summer Town Festival (July 15–17, 2006)
- SM Town Summer Concert (June 30 and July 1, 2007 – Olympic Gymnastics Arena)
- SM Town Week (2013)
- SMile Music Festival (2015)

=== Others ===
- SM Town Special Stage in Hong Kong (2017)
- SM Town Live 2018 In Osaka
- SM Town Live Special Stage in Santiago (2019)
- SM Town Live 2019 In Tokyo (2019)
- SM Town Live Culture Humanity (2021)
- SM Town Live 2022: SMCU Express at Kwangya (2022)

== Filmography ==
- I AM.: SM Town Live World Tour in Madison Square Garden (May 10, 2012) - theme song: "Dear My Family"
- SM Town Live in Tokyo Special Edition in 3D (October 11, 2012)

== SM Town official application ==
It is a mobile application launched by SM Entertainment for Android and iOS. It is the mobile version of SM Town's official website.

== SuperStar SM Town ==
In August 2014, SM Entertainment launched a rhythm game available for Android and iOS called SuperStar SM Town, featuring SM Town artists' songs.
