= List of SM Entertainment artists =

SM Entertainment logo since 2017

SM Entertainment, established in 1989 as SM Studio by music producer Lee Soo-man, is one of South Korea's largest and most influential entertainment companies and a cornerstone of the modern K-pop industry. Known for pioneering the idol training system, SM developed a structured approach to developing talent in singing, dancing, and performance that later became a blueprint for other agencies. SM debuted its first artist, Hyun Jin-young, in 1990, who has been credited with introducing rapping and hip hop music to South Korean audiences.

After changing its name to SM Entertainment in 1995, the company debuted its first idol group, H.O.T., in 1996, whose successful formula became the model for many K-pop groups. At the turn of the 21st century, amid industry-wide declines in domestic record sales, SM turned to other East Asian markets, debuting soloist BoA. In 2002, BoA became the first Korean artist to top the Oricon Albums Chart, a feat that is credited with opening the door for other K-pop artists in the country.

Over its history, SM has been home to a diverse array of successful idol groups, including S.E.S., TVXQ, Girls' Generation, Super Junior, Shinee, Exo, Red Velvet, NCT, and Aespa, as well as top soloists such as BoA, Taeyeon, Taemin and Baekhyun. As a talent agency, SM additionally represents numerous actors and entertainers. Artists under SM Entertainment are part of a collective known as SM Town.

== Current artists ==
=== Groups ===
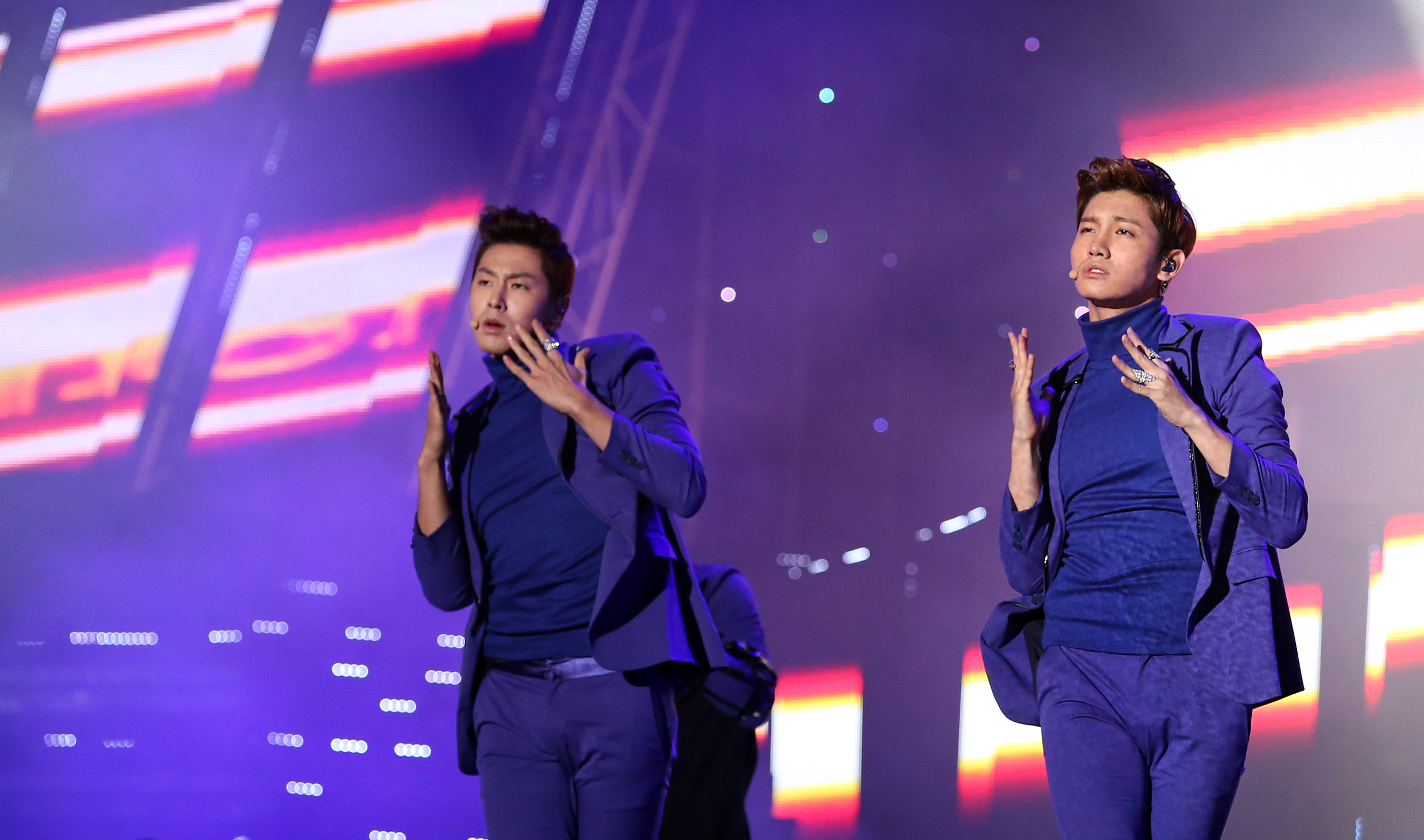
TVXQ in 2012

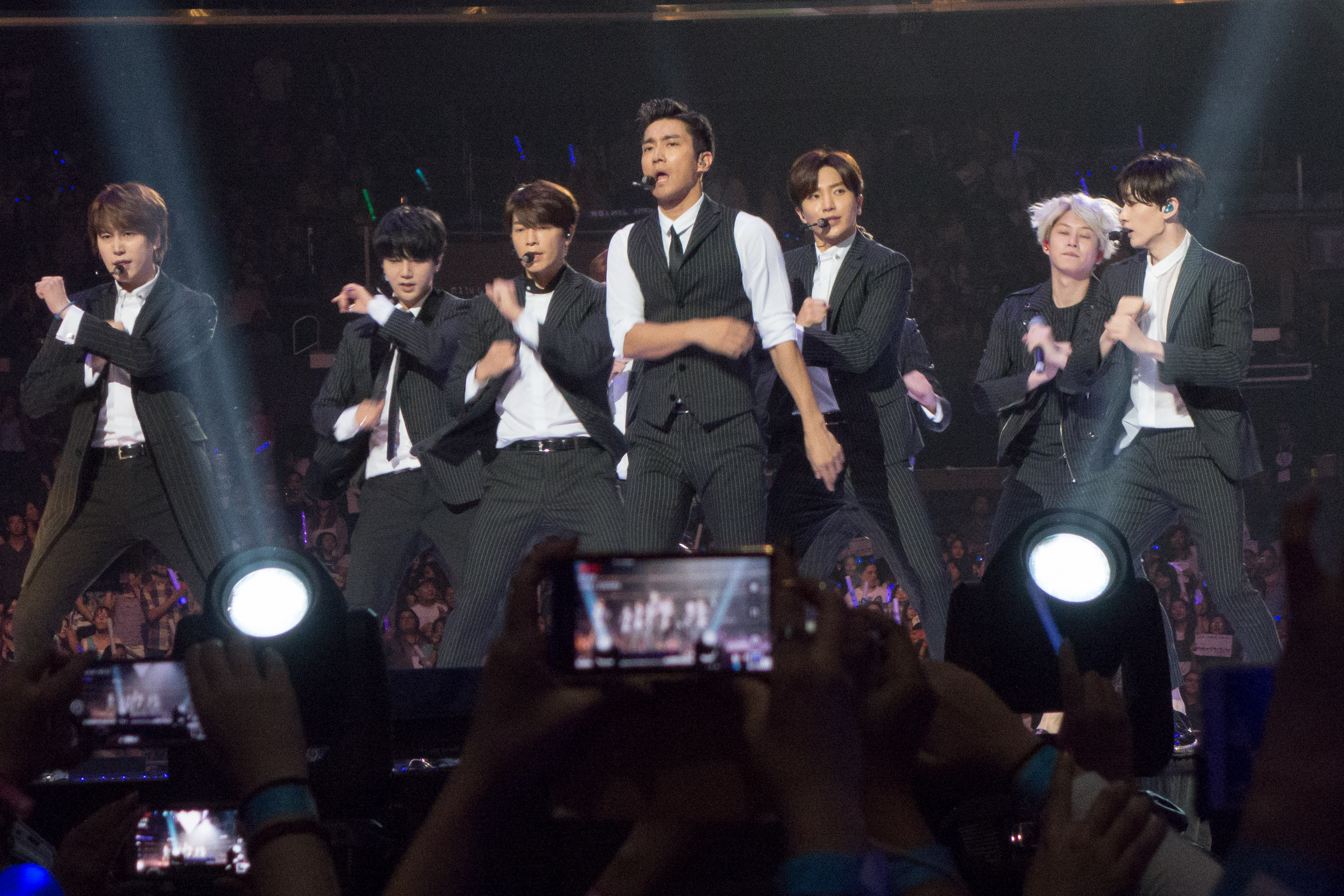
Super Junior in 2015

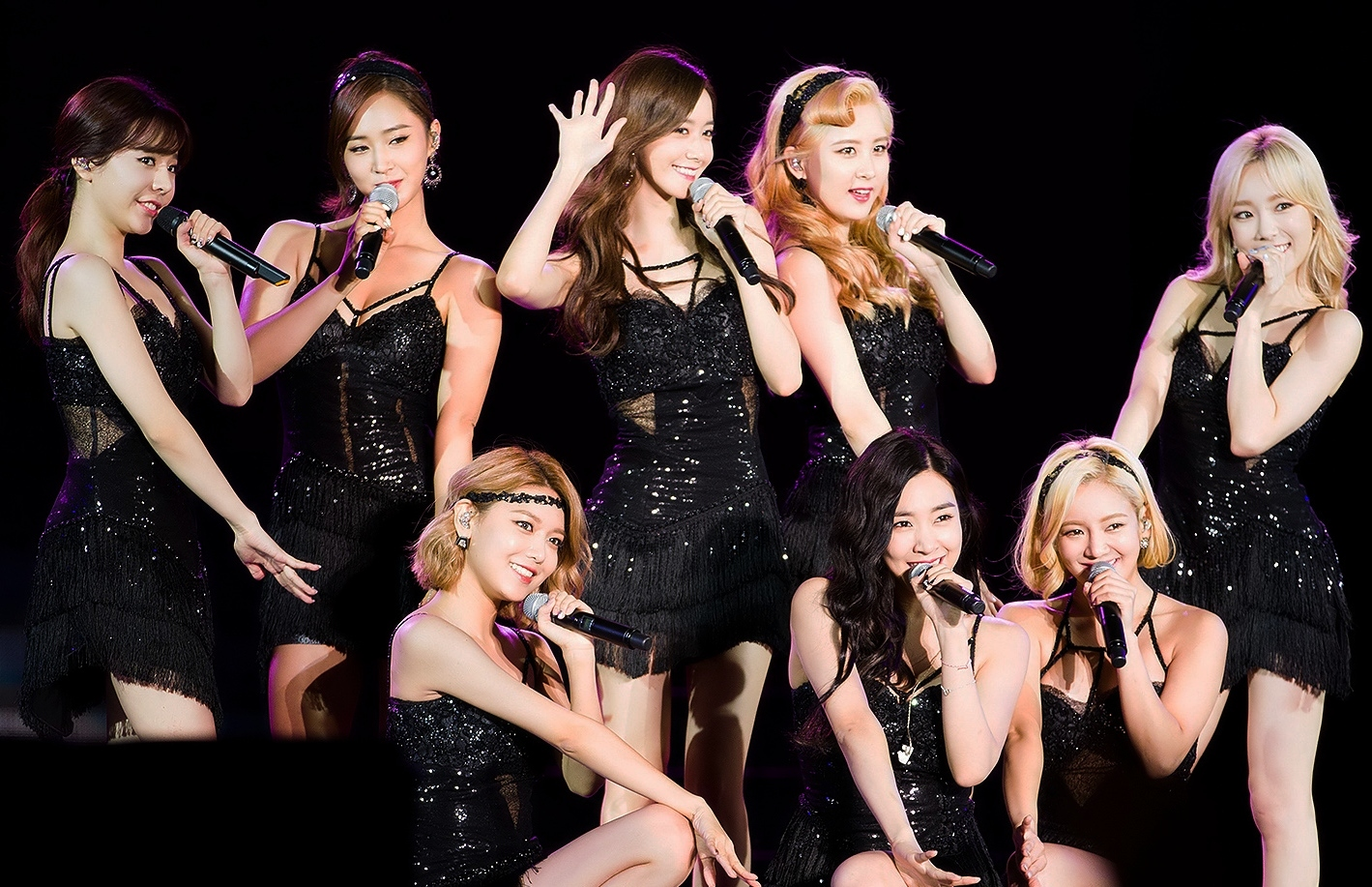
Girls' Generation in 2015

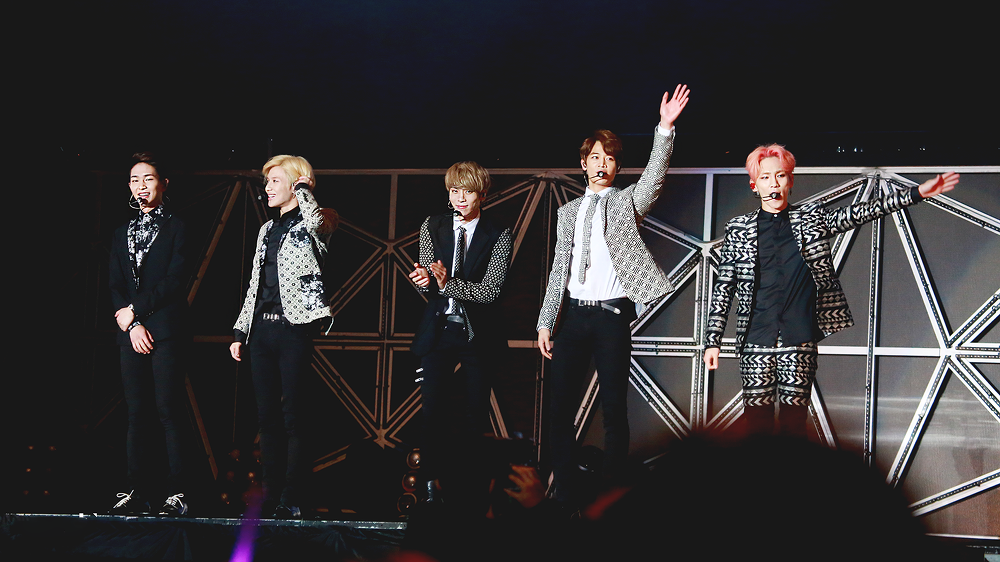
Shinee in 2015

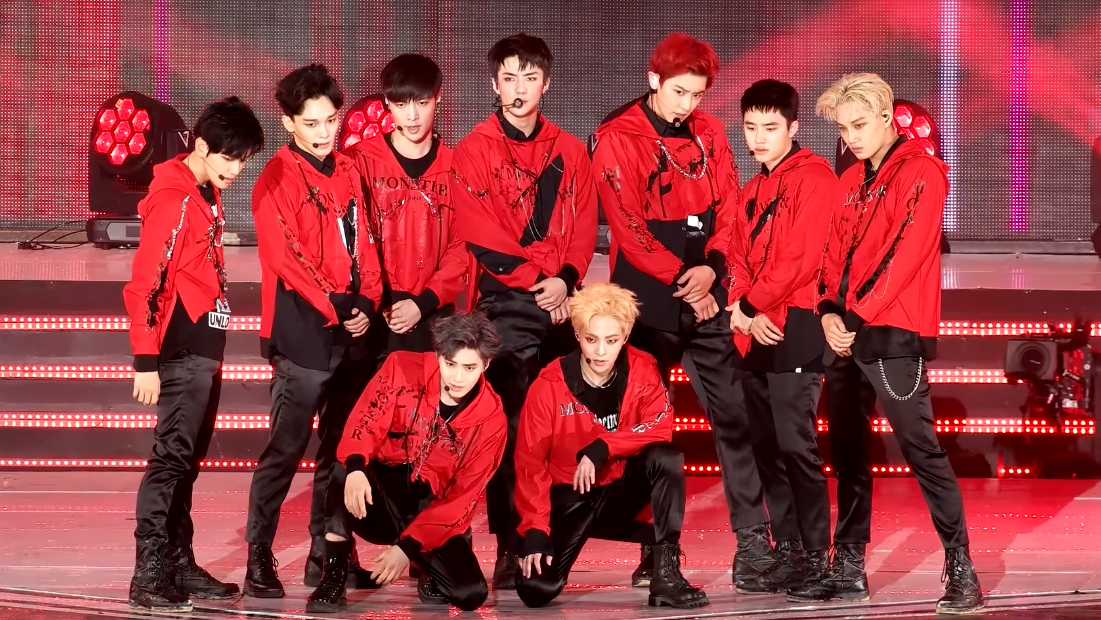
Exo in 2016

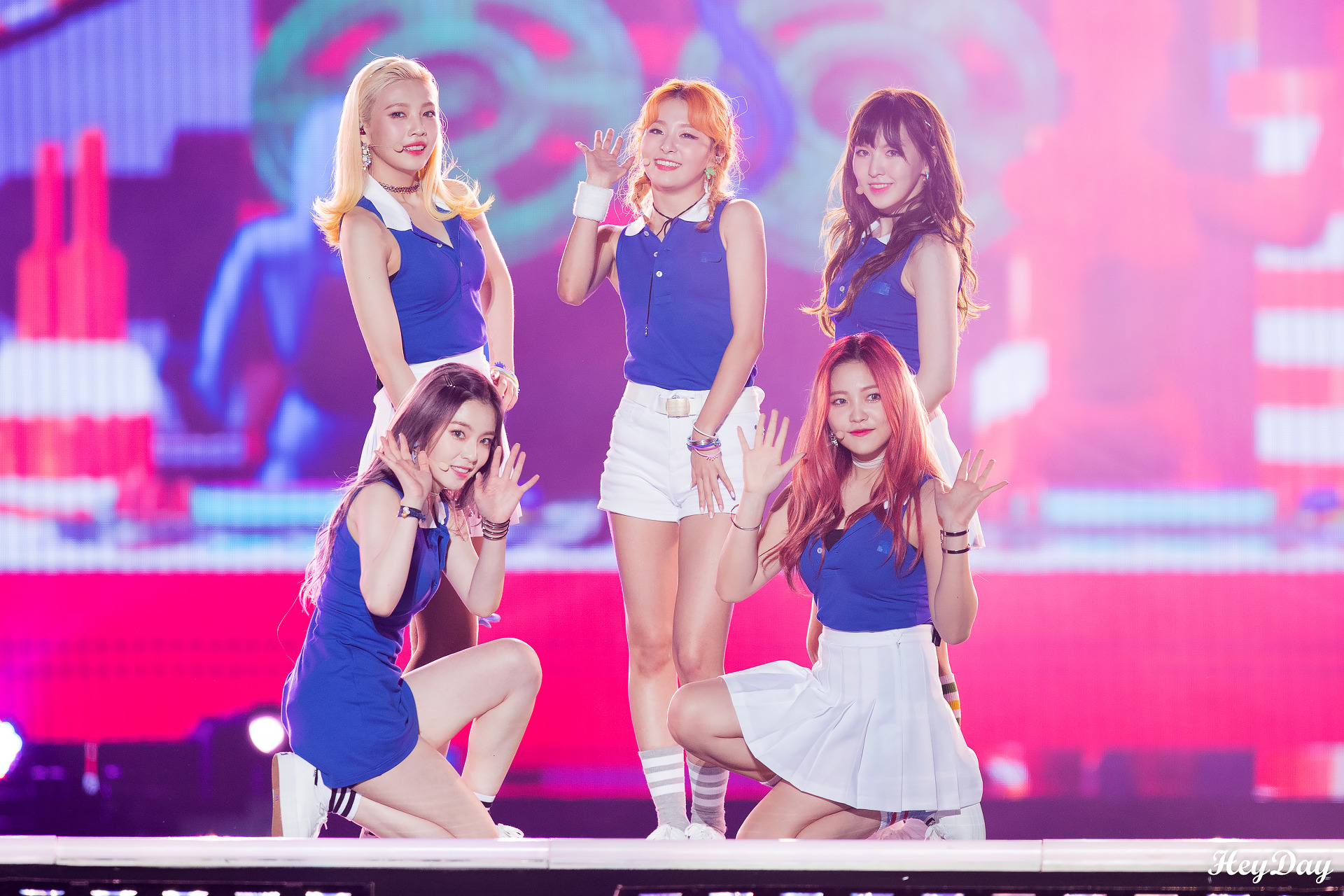
Red Velvet in 2016

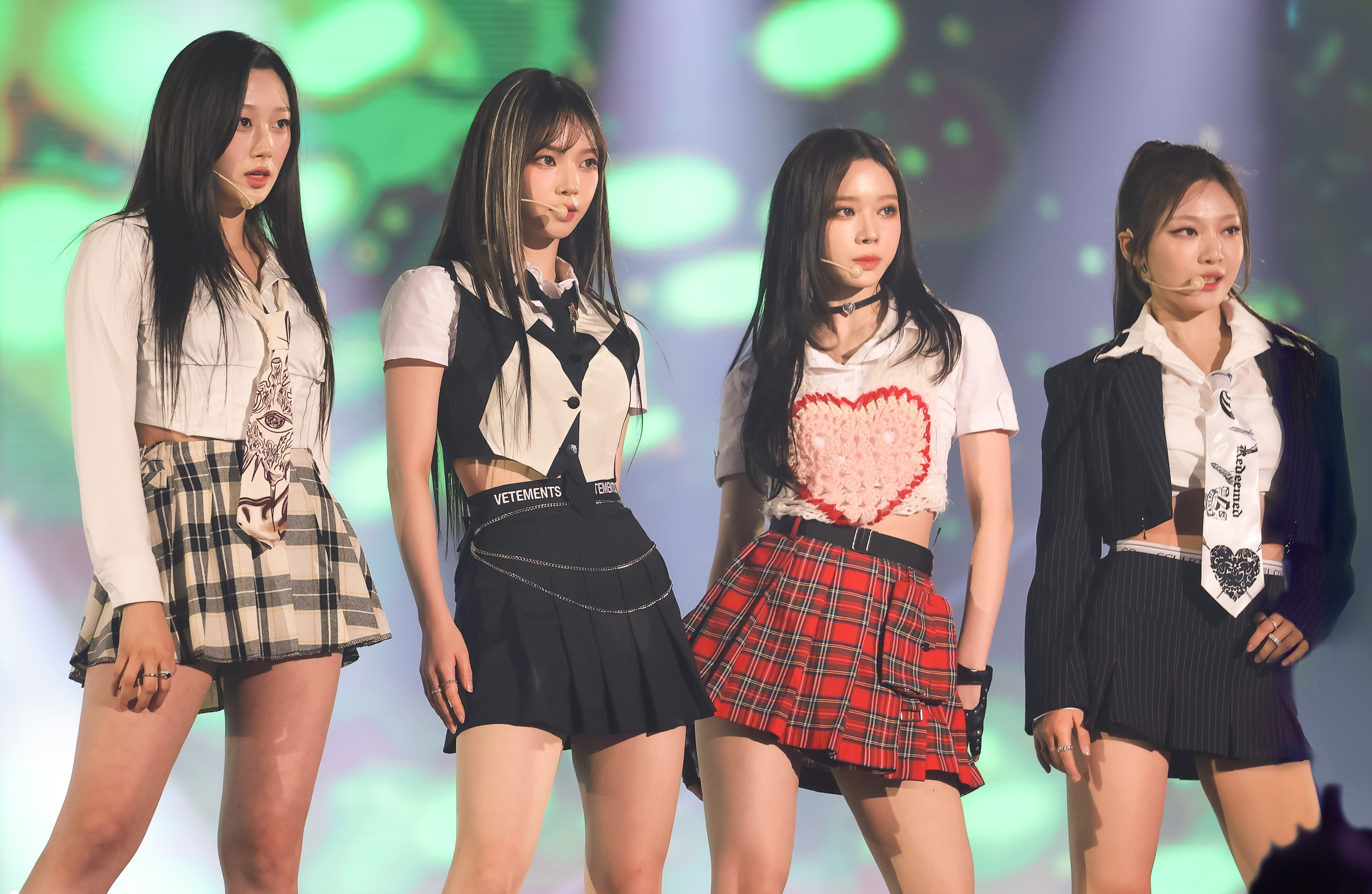
Aespa in 2023

SM Entertainment currently has nine active groups, the oldest being TVXQ, which was established in 2003 before debuting in 2004 with the single "Hug", and sold over 10 million albums cumulatively in South Korea in Japan in their first 10 years. Super Junior debuted in 2005 as a 12-piece ensemble, and have been dubbed "Kings of the Hallyu Wave" for their contributions to the Korean Wave. Girls' Generation debuted in July 2007 as a nine-member ensemble with the single "Into the New World", following it up with their self-titled debut studio album that November. Girls' Generation has been dubbed "The Nation's Girl Group" and have been credited with shifting the public's focus back to female idols after the Korean music industry experienced an influx of male idol groups from 2002 to 2007. In 2008, Shinee, a five-member boy band, debuted with the extended play Replay. The group has been considered by some to be among the best singers and dancers in the K-pop industry and has been bestowed the title "Princes of K-Pop" by multiple media outlets.

Pushing into the 2010s, SM further expanded with its roster Exo, its first new group in four years. The multi-national boy band established two sub-units: Exo-K, which focused on the South Korean market, and Exo-M, which focused on China. Both groups debuted in April 2012 with the EP Mama, which was released in both Korean and Mandarin editions. With the release of their debut album in 2013, Exo became the first Korean artist in 12 years to sell over one million copies of an album, and by 2018 had become the first South Korean artist who debuted in the 21st century to sell 10 million albums cumulatively. In 2014, five years after their last girl group, SM established Red Velvet, debuting as four-member group with the song "Happiness". After adding a fifth member, they released their debut EP, Ice Cream Cake, in 2015.

In 2016, SM launched what was called "K-pop's most experimental boy group to date", NCT. Growing to a peak of 26 members, NCT is frequently broken into smaller sub-units, each with different concepts. NCT 2018 Empathy (2018) was the group's first release with all members as a full collective under one project. As of June 2024, NCT has sold more than 40 million albums across all sub-units, making them SM Entertainment's best-selling act and one of the best-selling K-pop acts of all time. Aespa, a four-member girl group, debuted in 2020 with the single "Black Mamba", launching along with the SM Culture Universe. The group, which also includes digital avatars of each member, known "ae", is credited with popularizing the metaverse concept in K-pop. Aespa's second EP, 2022's Girls, became the biggest-selling debut week for a K-pop girl group, recording over 1,610,000 pre-orders prior to its release. SM's most recent boy group, Riize, was launched in 2023. The band's debut, Get a Guitar, became the second best-selling first week for a debut album in K-pop history, selling over one million copies. In 2025, SM launched a new girl group: Hearts2Hearts, an eight-member girl group that debuted with the single album The Chase.

Current SM Entertainment groups
Name	Debut year	Debut album	Members	Ref
TVXQ	2004	Tri-Angle	U-Know Yunho; Max Changmin; Hero Jaejoong (2003–2009) (Note: Hero Jaejoong left TVXQ in 2009 but remained in litigation with SM Entertainment over contract validity until both parties settled in 2012.); Micky Yoochun (2003–2009) (Note: Micky Yoochun left TVXQ in 2009 but remained in litigation with SM Entertainment over contract validity until both parties settled in 2012.); Xiah Junsu (2003–2009); (Note: Xiah Junsu left TVXQ in 2009 but remained in litigation with SM Entertainment over contract validity until both parties settled in 2012.)	
Super Junior	2005	Twins	Leeteuk; Heechul; Yesung; Shindong; Sungmin; Eunhyuk (Note: Eunhyuk left SM Entertainment in 2023 but remains a member of Super Junior.); Siwon; Donghae (Note: Donghae left SM Entertainment in 2023 but remains a member of Super Junior.); Ryeowook; Kyuhyun (Note: Kyuhyun joined Super Junior in 2006. He left SM Entertainment in 2023 but remains a member of Super Junior.); Hangeng (2005–2009) (Note: Hangeng left Super Junior in 2009 but remained in litigation with SM Entertainment over contract validity until both parties settled in 2011.); Kangin (2005–2019) (Note: Kangin left Super Junior in 2019 but remains with SM Entertainment.); Kibum (2005–2015) (Note: Kibum last performed with Super Junior in 2009 but remained a member until 2015 when he left SM Entertainment.)	
Girls' Generation	2007	Girls' Generation	Taeyeon; Sunny (Note: Sunny left SM Entertainment in 2023 but remains a member of Girls' Generation.); Tiffany (Note: Tiffany left SM Entertainment in 2017 but remains a member of Girls' Generation.); Hyoyeon; Yuri (Note: Yuri left SM Entertainment in 2026 but remains a member of Girls' Generation.); Sooyoung (Note: Sooyoung left SM Entertainment in 2017 but remains a member of Girls' Generation.); Yoona; Seohyun (Note: Seohyun left SM Entertainment in 2017 but remains a member of Girls' Generation.); Jessica (2007–2014) (Note: Jessica left Girls' Generation in 2014 but remained with SM Entertainment until 2015.)	
Shinee	2008	Replay	Onew (Note: Onew left SM Entertainment in 2024 but remains a member of Shinee.); Key; Minho; Taemin (Note: Taemin left SM Entertainment in 2024 but remains a member of Shinee.); Jonghyun (2008–2017) (Note: Jonghyun died in December 2017.)	
Exo	2012	Mama	Xiumin (Note: Xiumin left SM Entertainment in 2024 but remains a member of Exo.); Suho; Lay (Note: Lay left SM Entertainment in 2022 but remains a member of Exo.); Baekhyun (Note: Baekhyun left SM Entertainment in 2024 but remains a member of Exo.); Chen (Note: Chen left SM Entertainment in 2024 but remains a member of Exo.); Chanyeol; D.O. (Note: D.O. left SM Entertainment in 2023 but remains a member of Exo.); Kai; Sehun; Luhan (2012–2014) (Note: Luhan left Exo in 2014 but remained under contract with SM Entertainment until 2022.); Kris (2012–2014) (Note: Kris left Exo in 2014 but remained under contract with SM Entertainment until 2022.); Tao (2012–2015) (Note: Tao left Exo in 2015 but remained under contract with SM Entertainment until 2022.)	
Red Velvet	2014	Ice Cream Cake	Irene; Seulgi; Wendy (Note: Wendy left SM Entertainment in 2025 but remains a member of Red Velvet.); Joy; Yeri (Note: Yeri joined Red Velvet in 2015. She left SM Entertainment in 2025, but remains a member of Red Velvet.)	
NCT	2016	NCT 2018 Empathy	Taeyong; Doyoung; Ten (Note: Ten left SM Entertainment in 2026 but remains a member of NCT and its sub-units.); Jaehyun; Yuta; Haechan; Renjun; Jeno; Jaemin; Chenle; Jisung; Johnny; Jungwoo; Kun; Xiaojun; Hendery; Yangyang; Sion; Riku; Yushi; Jaehee; Ryo; Sakuya; Taeil (2016–2024) (Note: Taeil left NCT in August 2024 and SM Entertainment altogether in October of the same year.); Mark (2016–2026) (Note: Mark left both SM Entertainment and NCT in 2026.); Winwin (2016–2026); Lucas (2018–2023) (Note: Lucas left NCT in 2023 and SM Entertainment in 2026.); Shotaro (2020–2023) (Note: Shotaro left NCT in 2023 to join SM's new boy band Riize.); Sungchan (2020–2023) (Note: Sungchan left NCT in 2023 to join SM's new boy band Riize.)	
Aespa	2020	Savage	Karina; Giselle; Winter; Ningning	
Riize	2023	Get a Guitar	Shotaro; Eunseok; Sungchan; Wonbin; Sohee; Anton; Seunghan (2023–2024) (Note: Seunghan left Riize in 2024 but remains with SM Entertainment.)	
Hearts2Hearts	2025	The Chase	Carmen; Jiwoo; Yuha; Stella; Juun; A-na; Ian; Ye-on	
SMTR25	2027	To be released	Hanbi; Songha; Daniel; Hyunjun; Hamin; Jaewon; Woolin; Nicholas; Kassho; Justin; Haruta; Sadaharu; Charlie; Kachin; Tata	To be released

==== Sub-units ====
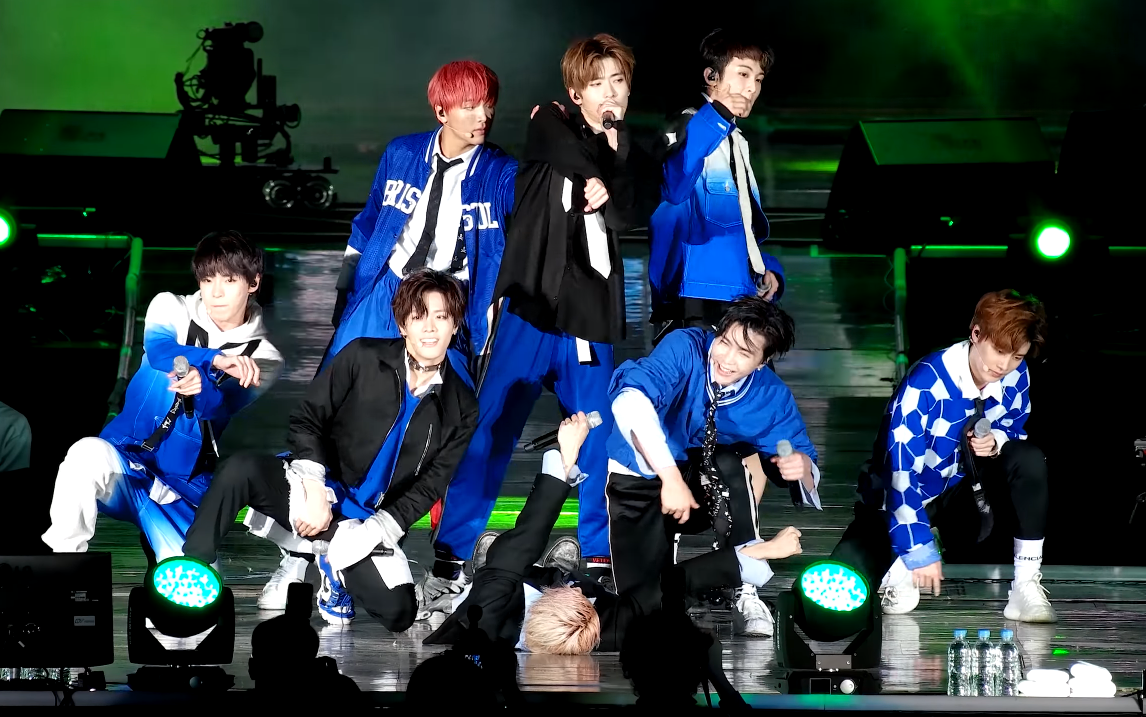
NCT 127 in 2017

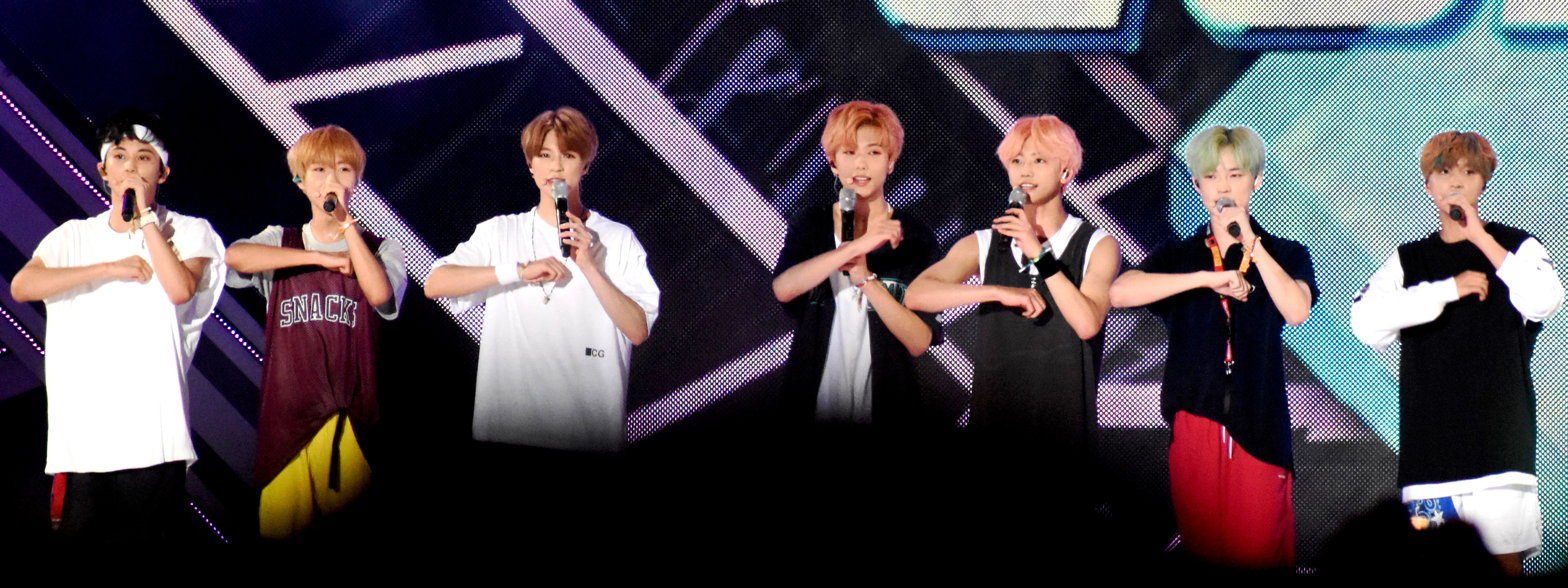
NCT Dream in 2018

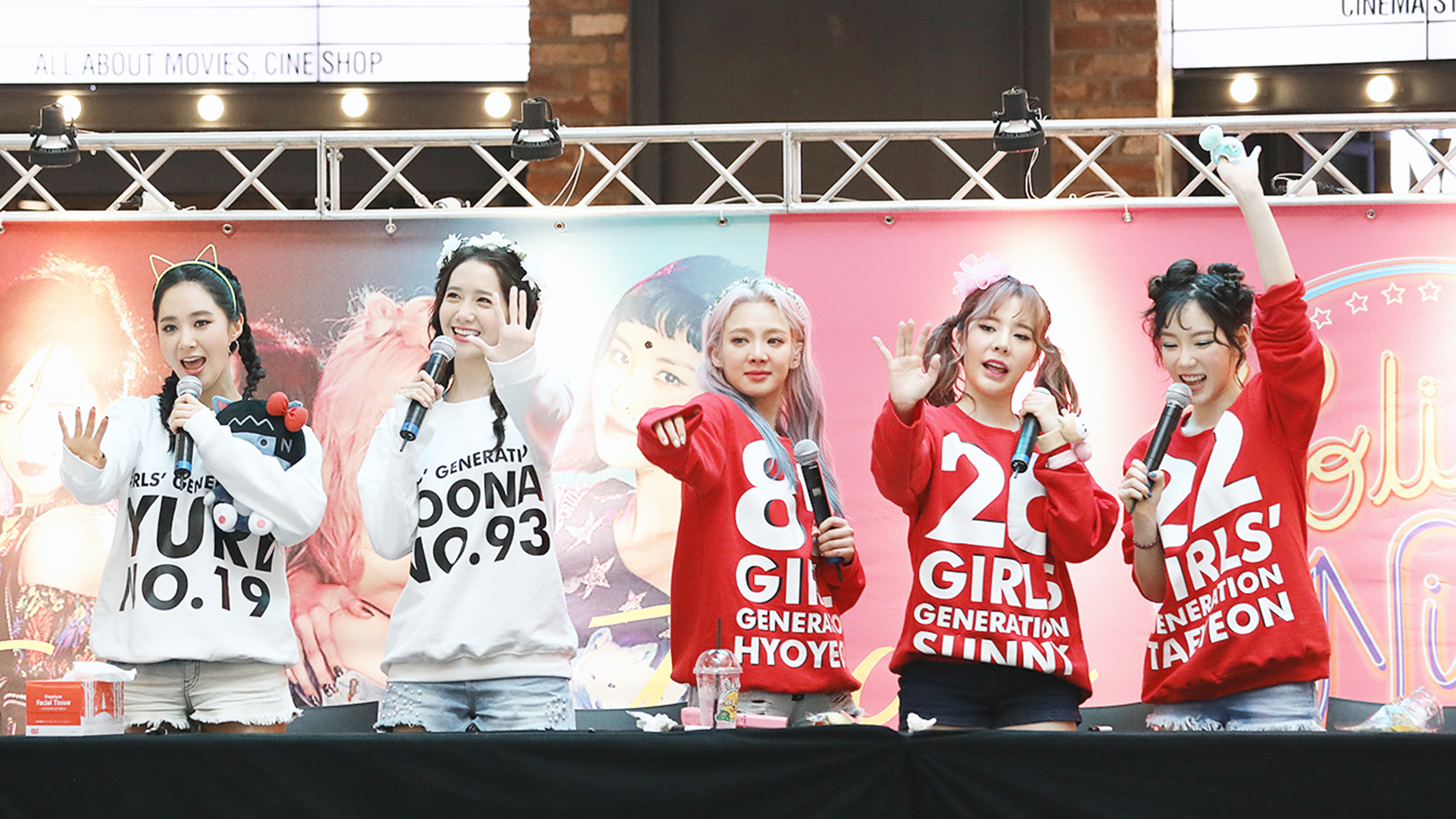
Oh!GG in 2017

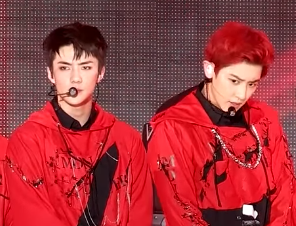
Exo-SC in 2016

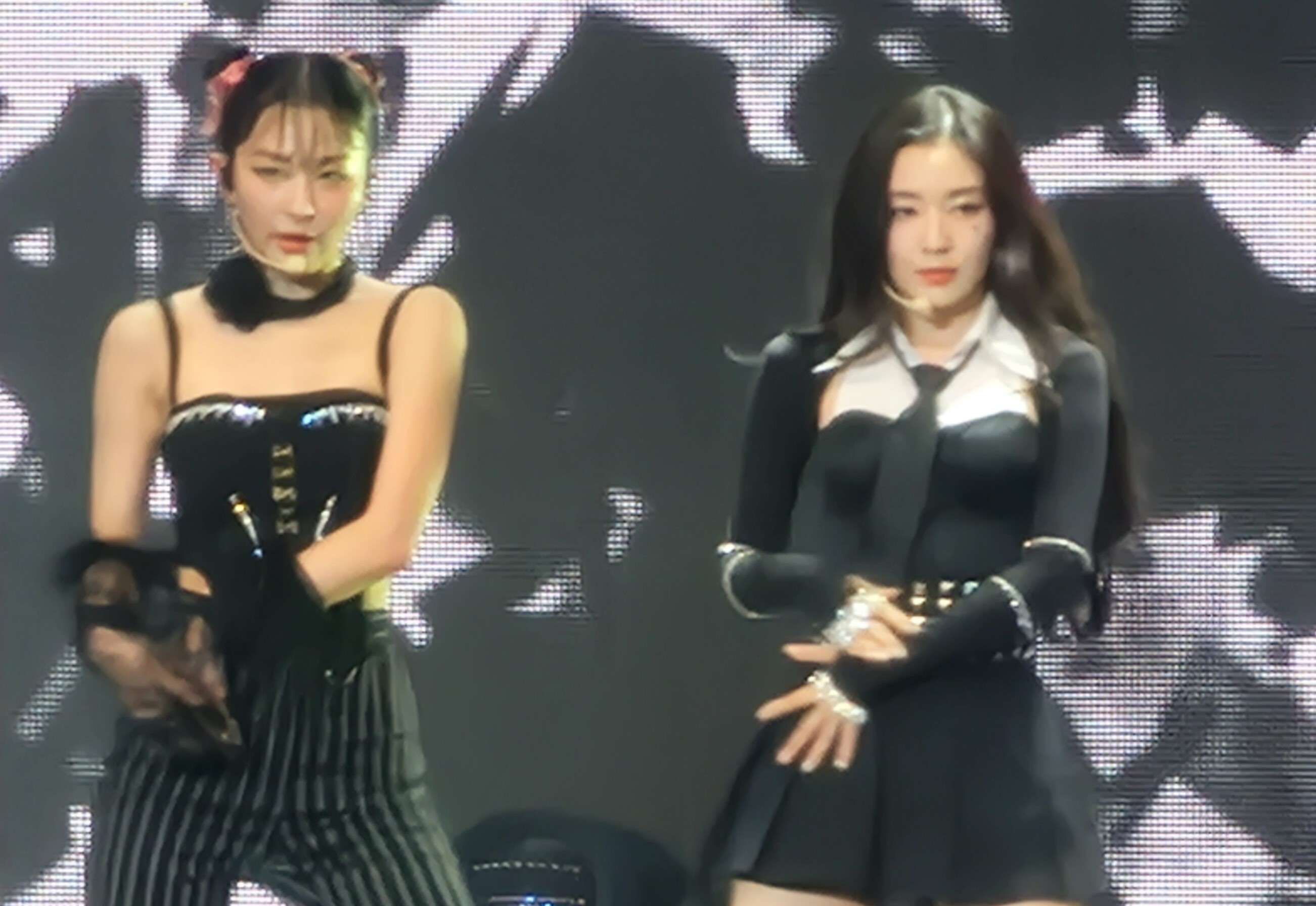
Red Velvet – Irene & Seulgi in 2024

SM's artist roster includes several groups known as "sub-units", which are smaller groups spun-off from their main group and functioning as their own independent band. Some sub-units are formed to target specific markets, languages, genres or performance styles not typically explored by the main group, or due to fan demand because of members' shared chemistry. NCT 127, a Seoul-based spin off of NCT, debuted in 2016 with the EP NCT#127. The group has been noted for their intricate choreography and have been dubbed K-pop's "kings of noise music". NCT Dream also debuted in 2016, originally as a dynamic unit with a graduation system where members would leave the group when they turned 20, though this was later removed in 2020 in favor of a fixed lineup. Oh!GG was launched in 2018, a sub-unit of the five members of Girls' Generation who opted to renew their contracts with SM the previous year.

Two sub-units were launched in 2019. WayV, another NCT sub-unit, this time focusing on the Mandarin-speaking market, debuted with The Vision, while Exo-SC, a hip-hop duo spun-off from Exo, made their first appearance with What a Life. Red Velvet – Irene & Seulgi released their first EP, Monster, in 2020, with their formation being inspired by a cover of S.E.S.'s "Be Natural" that the duo performed in 2014. NCT DoJaeJung, an R&B-based trio of NCT vocalists, debuted with 2023's Perfume, while NCT Wish, a Japan-based group, debuted in 2024 as NCT's fifth and final sub-unit.

Current SM Entertainment sub-units
Name	Spinoff of	Debut year	Debut release	Members	Ref
NCT U	NCT	2016	"The 7th Sense"	—N/a (Note: NCT U is a rotational sub-unit with no fixed line-up.)	
NCT 127	NCT	2016	NCT#127	Johnny; Taeyong; Yuta; Doyoung; Jaehyun; Jungwoo; Haechan; Taeil (2016–2024); Winwin (2016–2018) (Note: Winwin has been inactive with NCT 127 since November 2018 to focus on his activities with WayV. While no formal withdrawal was announced, recent official statements from SM Entertainment regarding the group's future lineup exclude him.); Mark (2016–2026)	
NCT Dream	NCT	2016	The First	Renjun; Jeno; Haechan; Jaemin; Chenle; Jisung; Mark (2016–2026)	
Oh!GG	Girls' Generation	2018	Lil' Touch	Taeyeon; Hyoyeon; Yuri; Yoona; Sunny (2018–2023) (Note: Sunny left Oh!GG upon the expiration of her contract with SM Entertainment in 2023, though she remains a member of Girls' Generation.)	
WayV	NCT	2019	The Vision	Kun; Ten; Xiaojun; Hendery; Yangyang; Winwin (2018–2026); Lucas (2019–2023)	
Exo-SC	Exo	2019	What a Life	Chanyeol; Sehun	
Red Velvet – Irene & Seulgi	Red Velvet	2020	Monster	Irene; Seulgi	
NCT DoJaeJung	NCT	2023	Perfume	Doyoung; Jaehyun; Jungwoo	
Super Junior-L.S.S.	Super Junior	2023	Let's Standing Show	Leeteuk; Shindong; Siwon	
NCT Wish	NCT	2024	Wish	Sion; Riku; Yushi; Jaehee; Ryo; Sakuya	
NCT JNJM	NCT	2026	Both Sides	Jeno; Jaemin	
Super Junior-83z	Super Junior	2026	Promise	Leeteuk; Heechul	
Girls' Generation-HRS	Girls' Generation	2026	"Skibidi"	Hyoyeon; Yuri; Sooyoung	
Exo-KASE	Exo	2026	"Walking Up The City"	Kai; Sehun	To be released

=== Soloists ===
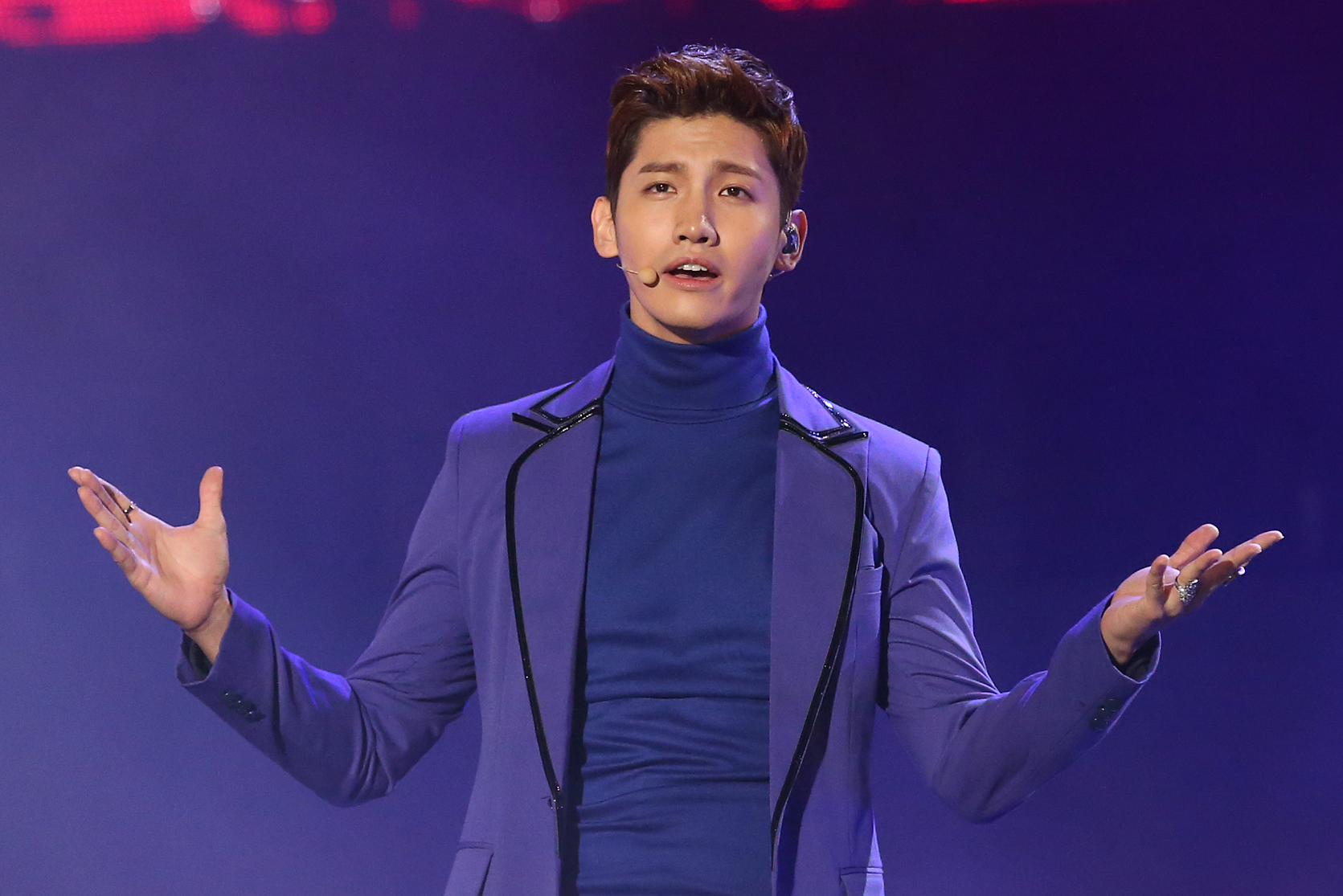
Max Changmin in 2012

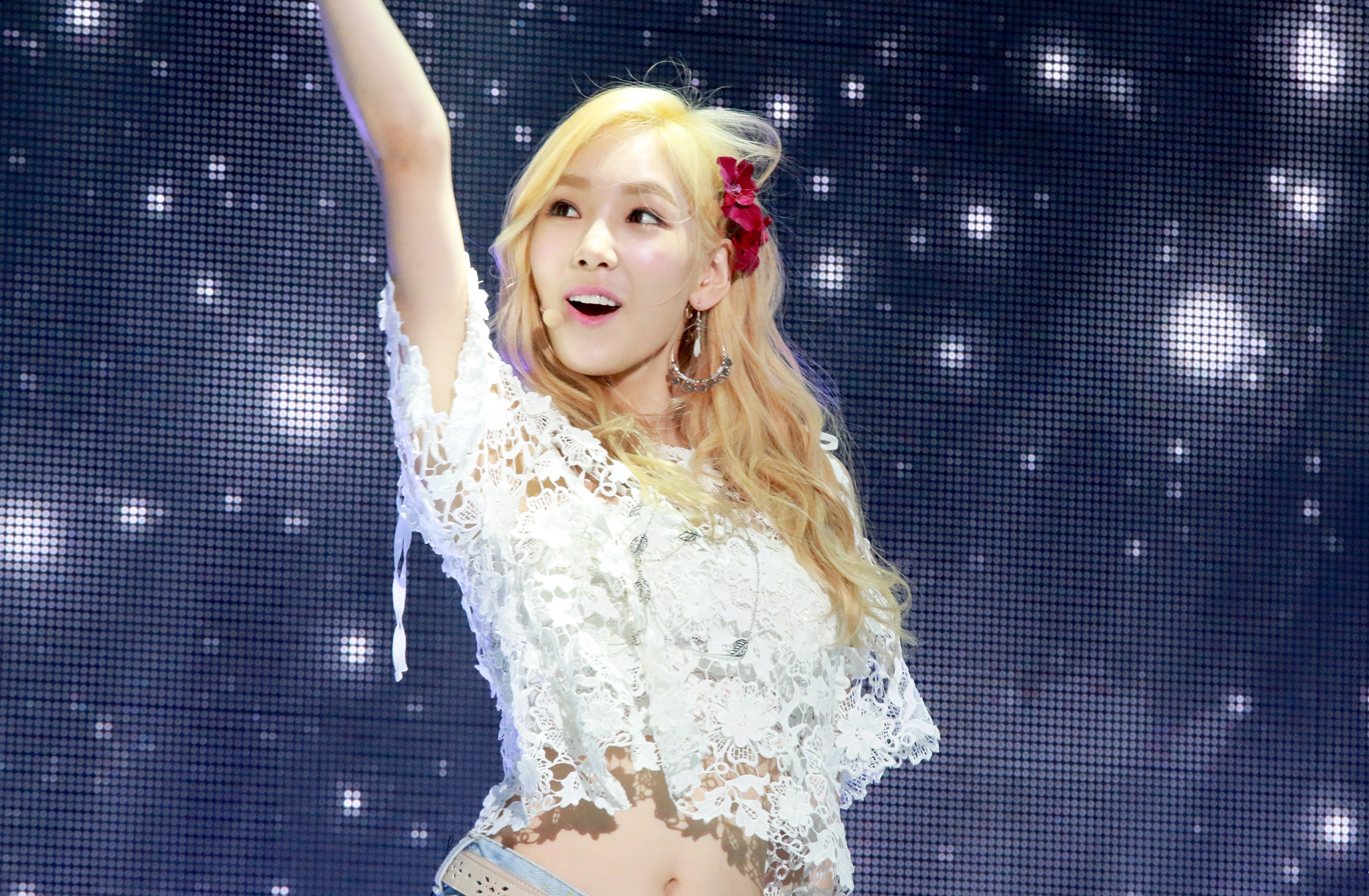
Taeyeon in 2015

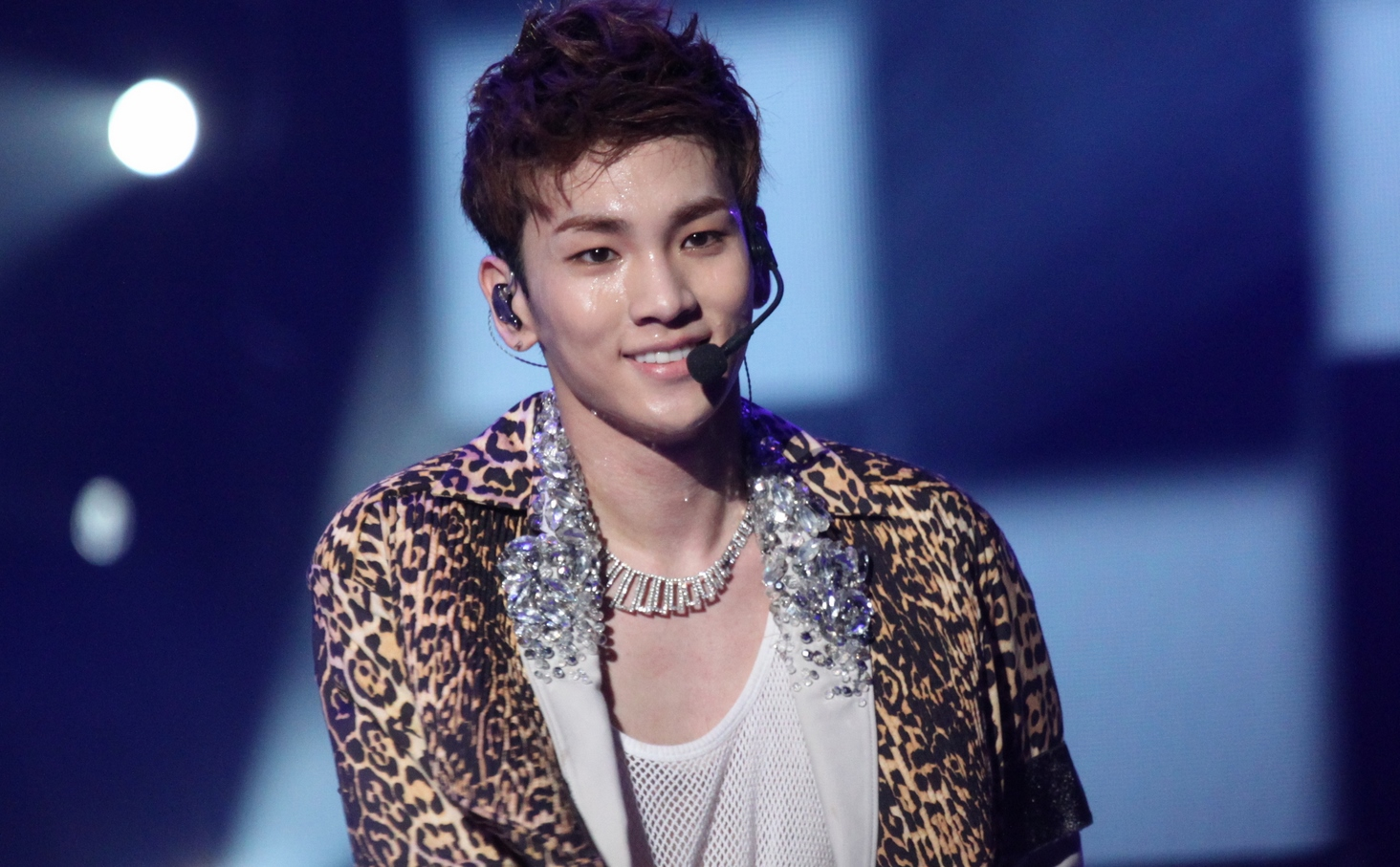
Key in 2012

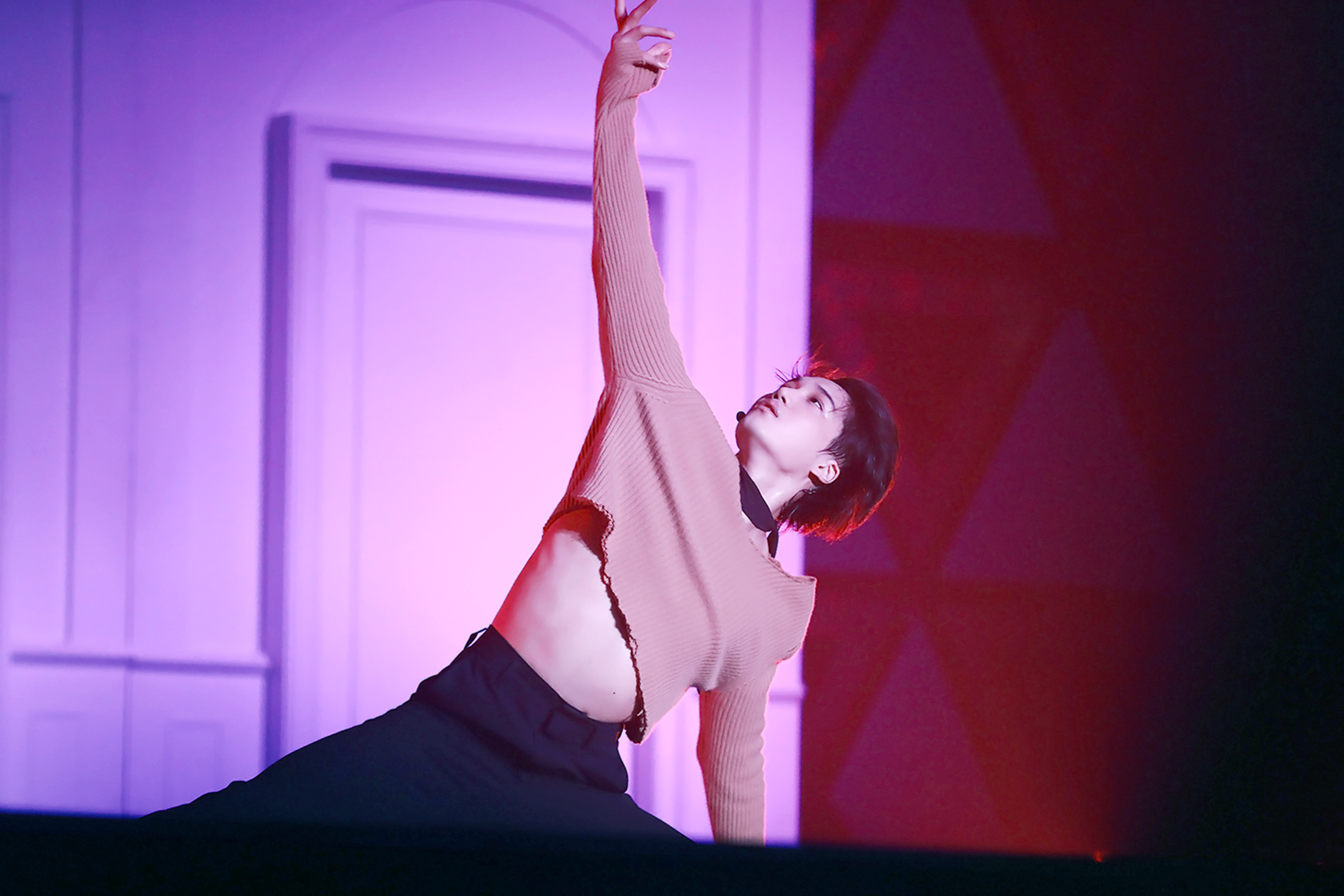
Kai in 2018

In addition to its groups, SM Entertainment is home to several soloists. While SM's solo roster does include artists that did not originally debut as part of a group, the vast majority of the company's roster of soloists consists of artists who are currently or were previously a member of one of SM's groups. SM's longest-tenured soloist, BoA, debuted in 2000 and has sold more than ten million albums. BoA has become one of South Korea's most influential and prominent singers, being widely referred to as the "Queen of K-pop". South Korean rock singer J-Min debuted in Japan in 2007, not releasing her Korean debut until 2014's Shine.

Originating from SM's first idol group, H.O.T., Kangta debuted as a soloist in 2001 with the album Polaris. He has gone on to become executive producer of Smash Hit, a production team of 20 composers under SM's Kreation Music Rights subsidiary. Taeyeon of Girls' Generation debuted as a soloist in 2015 with the EP I. Having sold over one million albums, Taeyeon was the best-selling female soloist in South Korea for the decade from 2011 to 2021. Often praised for her vocal abilities, Taeyeon was selected as the top K-pop vocalist in a 2015 survey of music industry officials. Ryeowook, with his 2016 debut The Little Prince, became the first artist to release under Label SJ, a sub-label established for Super Junior and its members in 2015.

Exo's Kai debuted as a soloist in 2020 with his eponymous EP. Known as one of K-pop's best dancers, Kai has also been labelled a fashion icon, being called one of K-pop's biggest fashion influencers. NCT leader Taeyong became the group's first soloist with 2023's Shalala. The EP, which was self-produced and self-written, recorded pre-orders of over 500,000 copies on the day of its release. The following year, fellow NCT members Ten, Lucas, Doyoung, Jaehyun, and Yuta joined Taeyong in debuting as soloists. Former Riize member Seunghan made his solo debut in 2025.

The following tables include all current SM Entertainment artists that have been labelled by SM as having made (or are soon to make) their official debut as a soloist, typically with a full promotional cycle. It does not include artists who have only released digital singles, SM Station songs, or soundtrack songs.

Current SM Entertainment solo artists
Name	Debut year	Debut album	Ref.
Kangta	2001	Polaris	
Lee Dong-woo	2013	'Smile' Turning to Jazz	
Zhou Mi	2014	Rewind	
U-Know Yunho	2015	U Know Y	
Max Changmin	2015	Close to You	
Taeyeon	2015	I	
Ryeowook	2016	The Little Prince	
Yesung	2016	Here I Am	
Hyoyeon	2018	Deep	
Key	2018	Face	
Yoona	2019	A Walk to Remember	
Suho	2020	Self-Portrait	
Kai	2020	Kai	
Joy	2021	Hello	
Seulgi	2022	28 Reasons	
Minho	2022	Chase	
Taeyong	2023	Shalala	
Doyoung	2024	Youth	
Jaehyun	2024	J	
Chanyeol	2024	Black Out	
Yuta	2024	Depth	
Irene	2024	Like a Flower	
Min Jiwoon	2024	Pink, then grey	
Chenle	2025	Lucid (Note: Chenle previously released albums as a child but Lucid is his debut solo release under SM Entertainment.)	
XngHan	2025	Waste No Time	
Haechan	2025	Taste	
Renjun	2026	Echoes Between Us	

=== Virtual ===
Name	Debut year	Debut single	Ref
Naevis	2024	"Done"	

=== Studio artists ===
Name	Years active	Role	Ref
Kenzie	2002–present	Songwriter; producer	
Shim Jae-won	2002–present	Choreographer	

=== Actors ===
Name	Years active	Ref
Lee Jae-ryong	1986–present (Note: Lee has been managed by SM Entertainment since 2012.)	
Yoo Ho-jeong	1991–present (Note: Yoo has been managed by SM Entertainment since 2012.)	
Lina	2002–present	
Choi Jong-yun	2006–present	
Lee Cheol-woo	2014–present (Note: Lee debuted as a model in 2014; as an actor, Lee has been managed by SM Entertainment since 2016.)	
Cho Jun-young	2021–present	
Kim Ji-woo	2022–present	
Lami	2022–present	

=== Entertainers ===
Name	Years active	Ref
Kim Kyung-shik	1993–present	
Lee Dong-woo	1993–present	

== Former artists ==
=== Groups ===
Name	Years active	Debut album	Members	Ref
The Blue	1992–1995; 2009	1st The Blue – New Release	Son Ji-chang; Kim Min-jong	
Tin Tin Five	1993–2010	Tin-Tin-Five	Pyo In-bong; Lee Woong-ho; Hong Rok-gi; Lee Dong-woo; Kim Kyung-sik; Jung Sung-hwa; Kim Hak-joon	
Major	1994	Easy Rock Single 1	Lim Bum-jun; Seo Yeon-su; Yu Han-ji	
J&J	1994	Guitar And Dance Single 1	Jay Kim; Jay Kang	
H.O.T.	1996–2001; 2018–2019	We Hate All Kinds of Violence	Moon Hee-joon; Jang Woo-hyuk; Tony Ahn; Kangta; Lee Jae-won	
S.E.S	1997–2002; 2016–2017	I'm Your Girl	Bada; Eugene; Shoo	
Shinhwa	1998–present (Note: Shinhwa departed SM in 2003)	Haegyeolsa	Eric Mun; Lee Min-woo; Kim Dong-wan; Shin Hye-sung; Jun Jin; Andy Lee	
Fly to the Sky	1999–2009; 2014–2019 (Note: Fly to the Sky departed SM in 2004)	Day by Day	Hwanhee; Brian Joo	
Milk (Note: Milk was formed under SM's sister label, BM Entertainment.)	2001–2003	With Freshness	Park Hee-von; Kim Bo-mi; Bae Yu-mi; Seo Hyun-jin	
Black Beat	2002–2007	The First Performance #001	Lee So-min; Hwang Sang-hoon; Jung Ji-hoon; Shim Jae-won; Jang Jin-young	
Shinvi	2002–2003	15 to 30	Yoo Soo-jin; Oh Sang-eun; Yoo-na	
Isak N Jiyeon	2002–2004	Tell Me Baby	Isak; Jiyeon	
Trax	2004–2012; 2015–2019; 2024	Paradox	Jay; Jungmo; Rose; Attack; Ginjo	
The Grace	2005–2010	One More Time, OK?	Lina; Dana; Sunday; Stephanie	
f(x)	2009–2016; 2019	Nu ABO	Victoria; Amber; Luna; Krystal; Sulli	

==== Sub-units ====
Name	Spinoff of	Years active	Debut release	Members	Ref
Super Junior-T	Super Junior	2007–2008; 2015	"Rokkugo"	Leeteuk; Heechul; Kangin; Shindong; Sungmin; Eunhyuk	
Super Junior-M	Super Junior	2008–2009; 2011–2015	Me	Han Geng; Sungmin; Eunhyuk; Siwon; Zhou Mi; Donghae; Ryeowook; Kyuhyun; Henry	
Super Junior-H	Super Junior	2008	Cooking? Cooking!	Leeteuk; Yesung; Kangin; Shindong; Sungmin; Eunhyuk	
Super Junior-D&E	Super Junior	2011–2015; 2017–present (Note: Super Junior-D&E departed SM in 2023)	"Oppa, Oppa"	Donghae; Eunhyuk	
Kim Heechul & Kim Jungmo (Note: Kim Heechul & Kim Jungmo were known as M&D until 2016.)	Super Junior; Trax	2011–2019	Cottage Industry	Kim Hee-chul; Kim Jung-mo	
The Grace – Dana & Sunday	The Grace	2011	"One More Chance"	Dana; Sunday	
Exo-K	Exo	2012–2014	Mama	Suho; Baekhyun; Chanyeol; D.O.; Kai; Sehun	
Exo-M	Exo	2012–2014	Mama	Xiumin; Lay; Chen; Kris; Luhan; Tao	
Girls' Generation-TTS	Girls' Generation	2012–2017	Twinkle	Taeyeon; Tiffany; Seohyun	
Exo-CBX	Exo	2016–present (Note: Exo-CBX departed SM in 2024.)	Hey Mama!	Xiumin; Baekhyun; Chen	

==== Project groups ====
SM Entertainment has established multiple project groups, which are groups that are usually formed on a temporary basis and for a specific purpose. Project groups typically disband after a short promotional period.

Name	Years active	Debut release	Members	Ref
S	2003; 2014	Fr. in. Cl	Kangta; Lee Ji Hoon; Shin Hye Sung	
Kangta & Vanness (Note: Kangta & Vanness was formed in collaboration with Sony BMG.)	2006	Scandal	Kangta; Vanness Wu	
SM the Ballad	2010; 2014	Miss You	Jay; Kyuhyun; Jonghyun; Jinho; Max Changmin; Yesung; Zhang Liyin; Taeyeon; Zhou Mi; Krystal; Chen	
Younique Unit	2012	PYL Younique Volume 1	Eunhyuk; Hyoyeon; Taemin; Henry; Kai; Luhan	
SM the Performance	2012–2013	"Spectrum"	U-Know; Eunhyuk; Donghae; Taemin; Minho; Kai; Lay	
Toheart (Note: Toheart was formed in collaboration with Woollim Entertainment.)	2014	1st Mini Album	Woohyun; Key	
SuperM (Note: SuperM was formed in collaboration with Capitol Records.)	2019–2021	SuperM	Baekhyun; Taemin; Kai; Taeyong; Ten; Lucas; Mark	
Got the Beat	2022–2023	Stamp on It	BoA; Taeyeon; Hyoyeon; Seulgi; Wendy; Karina; Winter	

=== Soloists ===
Name	Debut year	Departure year	Debut album	Ref
Hyun Jin-young (Note: Also credited as "Hyun Jin-young & Wawa", "Wawa" being the name of his backup dance crew.)	1990	1995	New Dance 1	
Yoo Young-jin	1993	2023	Blues in Rhythm	
BoA	2000	2025	ID; Peace B	
Dana	2001	2020	Dana	
Jang Na-ra	2001	2003	First Story	
Moon Hee-joon	2001	2004	Alone	
Chu Ga-yeoul	2002	2008	Don't Go Away	
Zhang Liyin	2006	2017	I Will	
J-Min	2007	2025	Korogaru Ringo	
Henry	2013	2018	Trap	
Taemin	2014	2024	Ace	
Kyuhyun	2014	2023	At Gwanghwamun	
Jonghyun	2015	2017	Base	
Amber	2015	2019	Beautiful	
Tiffany	2016	2017	I Just Wanna Dance	
Luna	2016	2019	Free Somebody	
Lay	2016	2022	Lose Control	
Seohyun	2017	2017	Don't Say No	
Yuri	2018	2026	The First Scene	
Onew	2018	2024	Voice	
Sulli	2019	2019 (Note: Sulli died in October 2019.)	Goblin	
Chen	2019	2024	April, and a Flower	
Baekhyun	2019	2024	City Lights	
Sungmin	2019	2025	Orgel	
Wendy	2021	2025	Like Water	
D.O.	2021	2023	Empathy	
Xiumin	2022	2024	Brand New	
Ten	2024	2026	Ten	
Lucas	2024	2026	Renegade	
Mark	2025	2026	The Firstfruit	

=== Studio artists ===
Name	Period	Role	Ref
Yoo Young-jin	1993–2023	Composer; producer	
Jo Yoon-kyung	2002–c. 2023	Songwriter	

=== Actors ===
Name	Period	Ref
Park Hee-von	2001–c. 2012	
Go Ara	2003–2016	
Lee Yeon-hee	2001–2020	
Kim Min-jong	2006–2023	
Ki Do-hoon	2016–2021	

== Labels-in-company and subsidiaries ==
=== Current ===
==== Labels-in-company ====
SM Entertainment has four internal sub-labels that it refers to as "labels-in-company" (LIC). The sub-labels host genres not generally found under SM's main roster, including classical, contemporary R&B, and EDM.

===== ScreaM Records =====
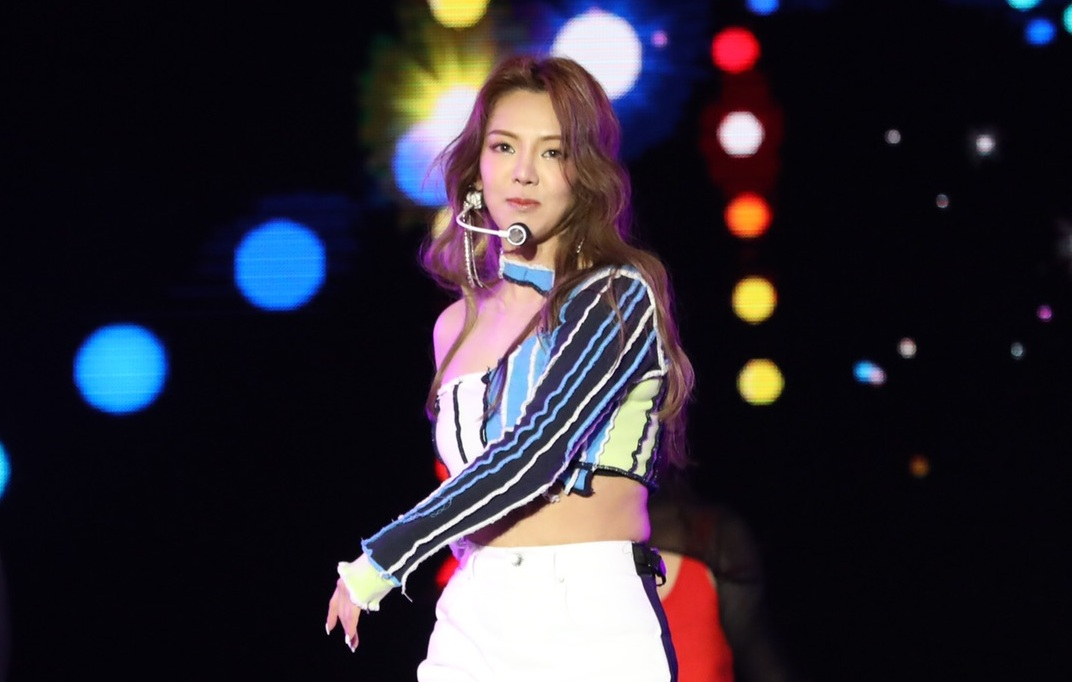
DJ Hyo in 2020

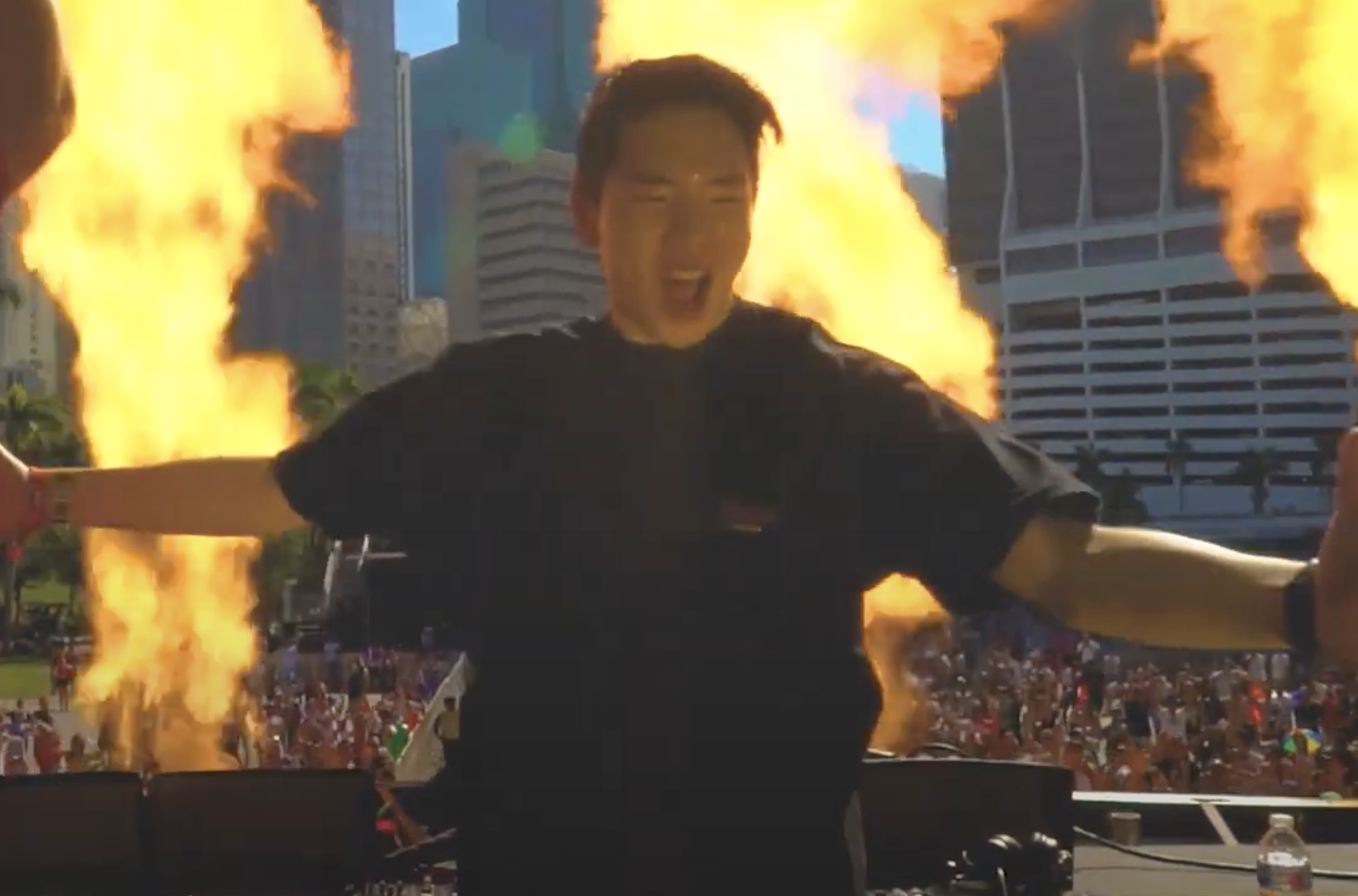
Raiden in 2018

ScreaM Records is an electronic dance music label launched by SM in 2016, marketed as focusing on "performance that you enjoy together", as opposed to "performance that you see and listen to". ScreaM Records roster of in-house DJs currently includes Imlay, DJ Hyo and Raiden, among others. In addition to its in-house DJ roster, ScreaM releases collaborations with non-SM EDM DJs, producers, and artists.

Current ScreaM Records artists
Name	Years active	Ref
Ginjo	2013–present (Note: Ginjo has been managed by ScreaM Records since 2018.)	
Raiden	2013–present (Note: Raiden has been managed by ScreaM Records since 2019.)	
Imlay	2016–present (Note: Imlay has been managed by ScreaM Records since 2017.)	
DJ Hyo	2018–present	
Mar Vista	2019–present	

===== SM Classics =====
SM Classics is a classical music label established in 2020. Under a memorandum of understanding with the Seoul Philharmonic Orchestra, the label releases orchestral re-arrangements of SM's K-pop songs. In addition to K-pop rearrangements, the label also releases original compositions.

Current SM Classics artists
Name	Debut year	Ref
Sumi Jo		
SM Classics Town Orchestra	2020	
Yohan Kim	2024	
SM Jazz Trio	2024	

===== Krucialize =====
Krucialize is an R&B label launched by SM in 2024. The label launched its first (and, as of January 2025, only) artist in October 2024 when singer Min Jiwoon debuted with the single "Sentimental Love".

===== SMArt =====
SMArt is a music label launched by SM in 2025, led by Kangta as the main producer. According to SM, the label embraces various music genres and "reinterprets K-pop as cultural content". It currently represents Yim Si-wan and former SM trainee Yunee.

Current SMArt artists
Name	Debut year	Ref
Yim Si-wan	2010 (Note: Yim Si-wan has been managed by SMArt since 2025)	
Yunee	2026	

==== Kustomade ====
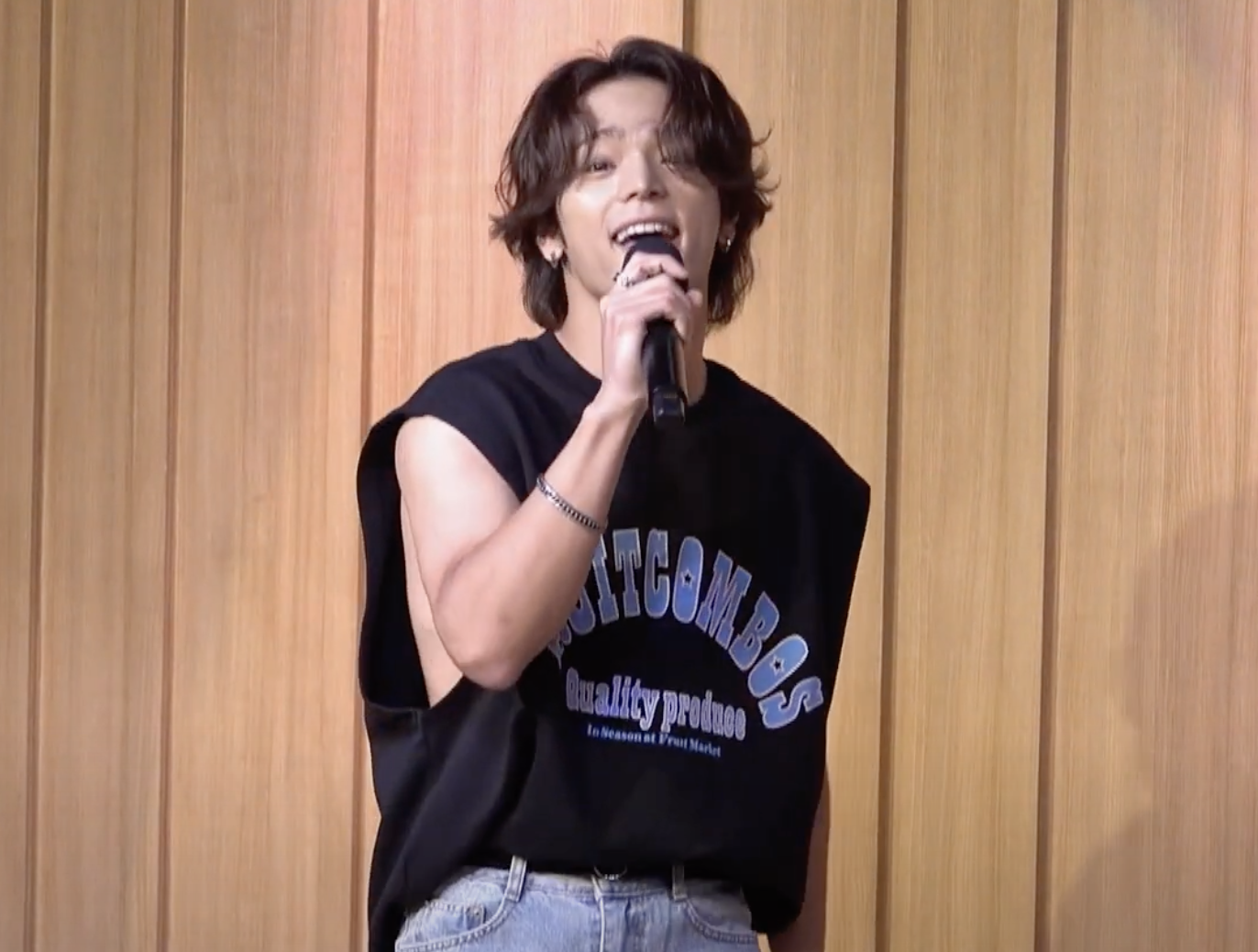
Kim Woojin in 2023

Kustomade is a label established by SM subsidiary Kreation Music Rights (KMR) in 2024. It was launched as a successor to independent label 10X Entertainment, which KMR acquired in 2023. Kustomade currently represents artists such as R&B singer Yelo, who debuted on the label in October 2024 with the single "Naked", and former Stray Kids member Kim Woojin, whose April 2024 EP I Like the Way was label's first release.

Current Kustomade artists
Name	Debut year	Debut release	Ref
Yelo	2018	"Swim in You" (Note: Yelo's first release under Kustomade was 2024's "Naked".)	
Kim Woojin	2021	The Moment: A Minor (Note: Kim Woojin debuted in 2021 under Kustomade's predecessor, 10x Entertainment. Kim's first release under Kustomade was 2024's I Like the Way.)	

==== SM Culture & Contents ====
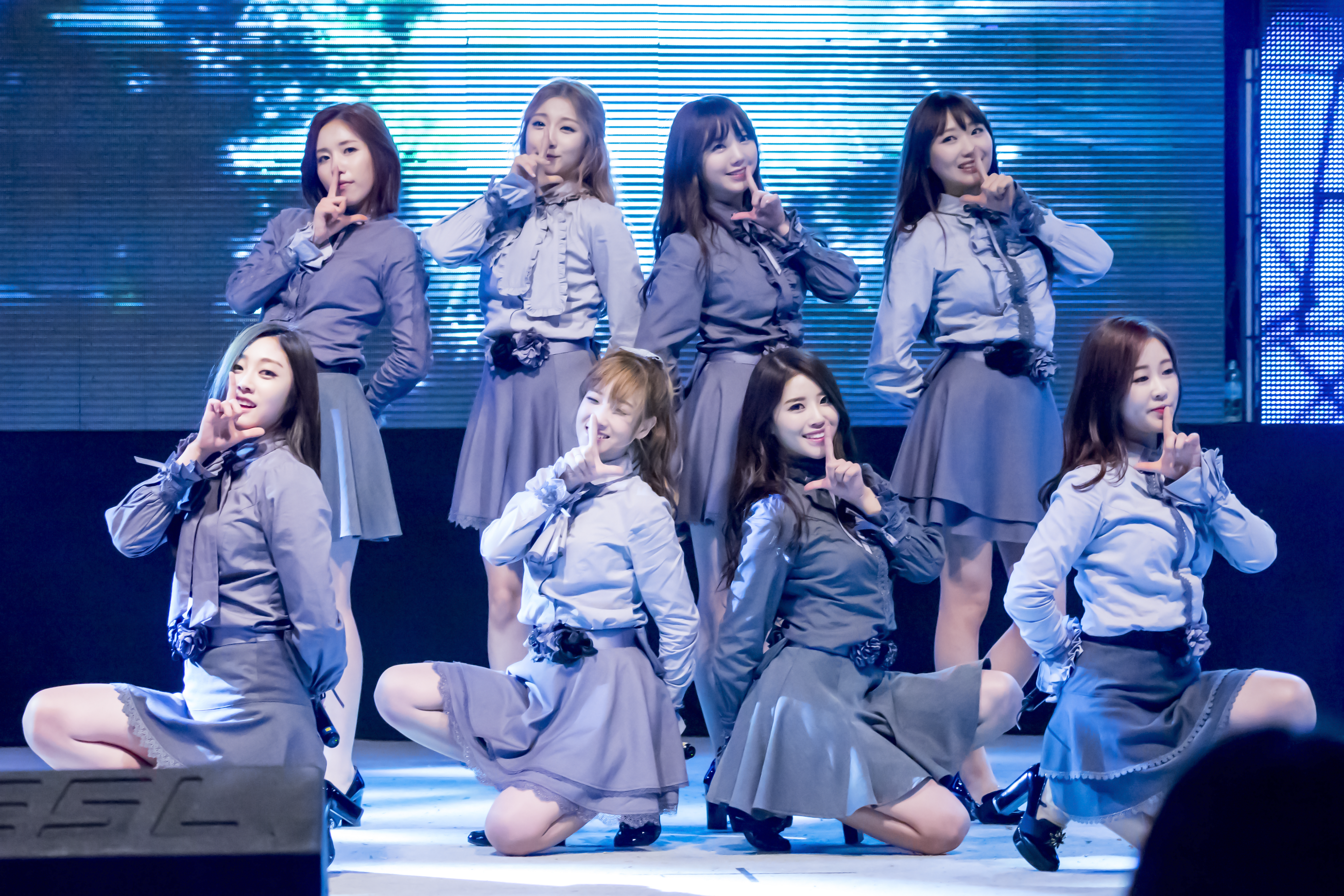
Lovelyz in 2016

SM Culture & Contents (SM C&C) is a travel, production and talent agency owned by SM. The agency was established in April 2012 as part of SM's acquisition of travel agency BT&I. SM C&C entered the talent management industry through its October 2012 acquisition of AM Entertainment, and expanded into television and film production with its 2013 acquisition of Hoon Media. As a talent agency, SM C&C currently manages artists such as actor Yoon Na-moo, actress Bang Min-ah, comedian Kang Ho-dong, and television personality Jang Ye-won.

SM C&C previously owned K-pop agency Woollim Entertainment via a 2013 acquisition, though the company was spun-off in 2016. During this period, Woollim's roster included boy band Infinite, Lovelyz, an eight-member girl group that debuted with 2014's Girls' Invasion, twin duo Tasty, and soloist Joo.

==== KeyEast ====
KeyEast is a talent management agency established in 2004 by actor Bae Yong-joon. SM Entertainment acquired a controlling share of KeyEast in 2018. The agency's roster currently includes actors Kim Dong-wook and Yoon Jong-hoon, as well as actresses Han Sun-hwa and Stephanie Lee. Artists previously managed by KeyEast include singer and actresses Uhm Jung-hwa and Goo Hara, and actor Ji Soo.

=== Former ===
==== Baljunso ====
Baljunso is an indie label established in 1991 by music executive Kang Byung-yong. SM Entertainment acquired Baljunso in 2014 with the intent to use the label to revive hip-hop music and bands, which the company stated were considered non-mainstream in K-pop. Artists who have been under Baljunso include hip-hop group Play the Siren, who debuted with the 2014 album Dream Drive, and singer Jang Hye-jin, whose first release under the label was 2015's "Old Photo".

==== Million Market ====
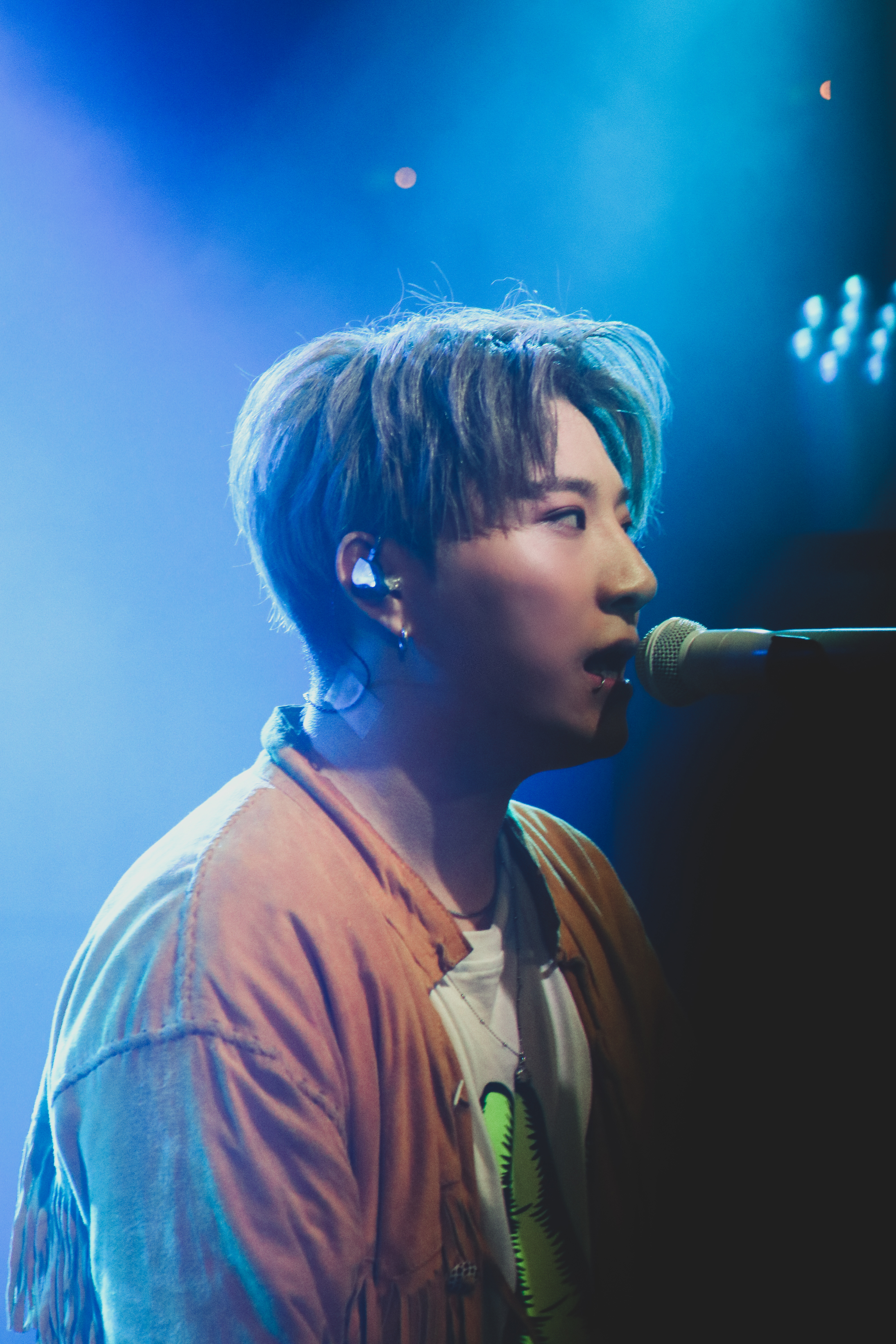
Penomeco in 2019

Million Market is an entertainment agency focusing on hip-hop and contemporary R&B. The agency became an SM sub-label in 2018 when the company acquired a majority of Million Market's shares. SM divested itself of Million Market in 2023 when the company's shares were acquired by BPM Entertainment. At the time of the agency's acquisition by SM, its artists included singer-songwriter Suran, who released her 2017 debut EP Walkin' on the label, R&B singer-songwriter Chancellor and rapper Penomeco. During its time under SM's control, the agency's roster expanded to include artists such as rapper MC Mong, singer-songwriter Jiselle, and vocal duo 2F.

Million Market artists active during period as SM sub-label (2018–2023)

- 2F
- Chancellor
- Coogie
- Highcolor
- Jiselle
- Lily
- Lim Chae-eon
- MC Mong
- Moon Soo-jin
- Oh Dam-yul
- Park Do-ha
- Penomeco
- Sung Dam
- Suran
- Woo Tae-woon

==== Mystic Story ====
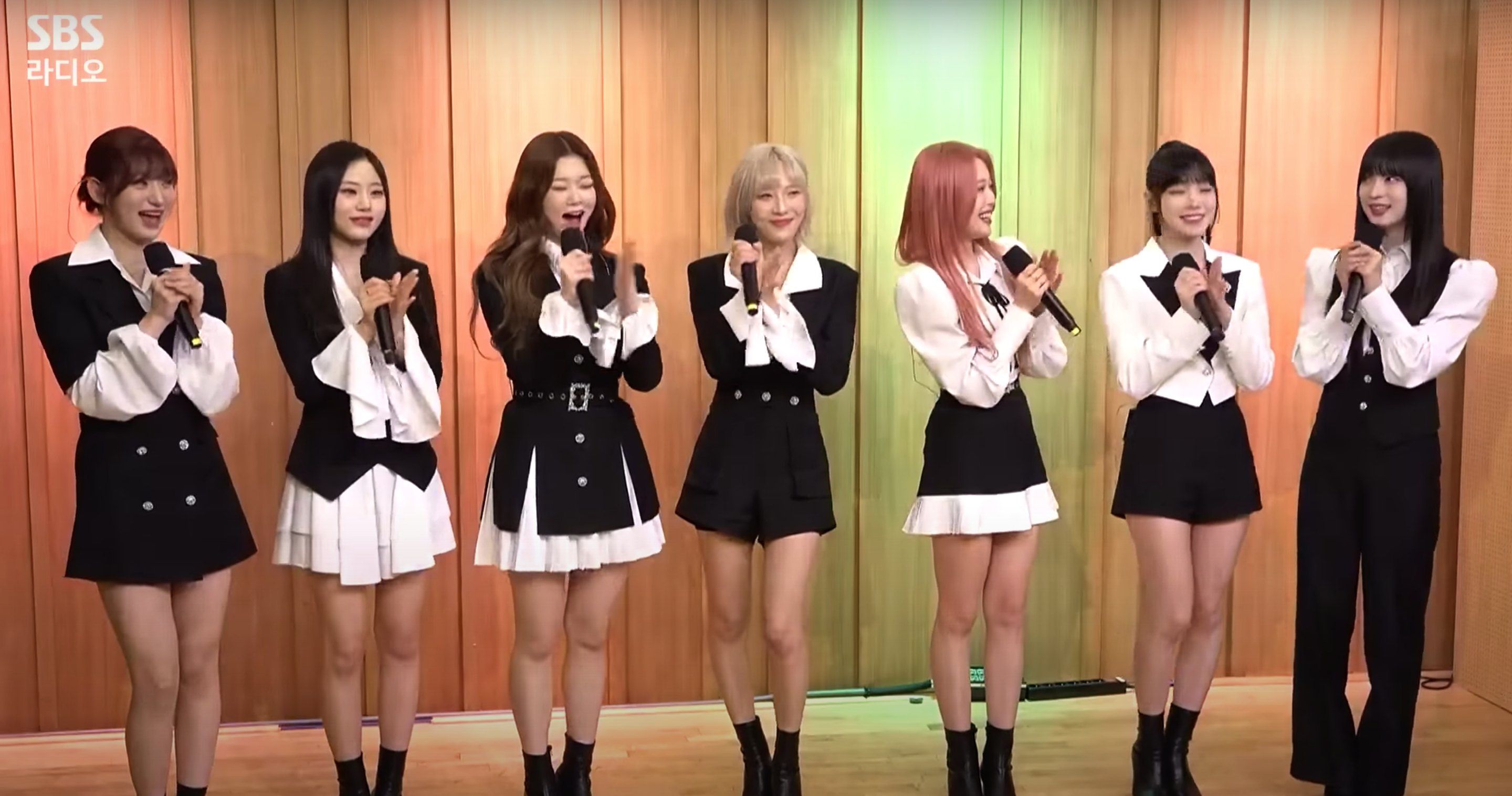
Billlie in 2023

Mystic Story is an entertainment agency established in 2011 by singer Yoon Jong-shin. SM Entertainment became the agency's largest shareholder in 2017. Mystic Story's current artist roster includes rock band Daybreak, Lucy, an ensemble formed through JTBC talent show Superband, and Billlie, the agency's first girl group, debuting in 2021 with the EP The Billage of Perception: Chapter One, as well as soloists such as Jeong Jin-woon, Eddy Kim, and Jo Jung-chi.

Under its Mystic Actors division, the agency currently manages actors such as Ryohei Otani, Jo Han-sun, and Kim Kang-min, as well as actresses including Oh Ji-eun, Kim Si-a, and Hwang Bo-reum-byeol.

In August 2025, SM announced, in their semi-annual report, that they have sold all of Mystic Story’s share.
