= Scandal (Kangta & Vanness album) =

- Korean cover

EP by Kangta & Vanness
- Released: May 19, 2006
- Recorded: 2005–2006
- Studio: SM Studios (Seoul)
- Genres: Mandopop; K-pop; dance-pop; R&B; hip hop
- Length: 23:21
- Languages: Korean; Mandarin; English
- Labels: SM; Sony Taiwan
- Producers: Lee Soo-man (exec.); Kangta; Yoo Young-jin; Ahn Ik-soo; Yoo Han-jin

Scandal is a one-off EP released in 2006 by Kangta & Vanness, a duo composed of Korean singer Kangta and Taiwanese singer Vanness Wu. Several of the songs on Scandal were recorded in both Korean and Mandarin, and two music videos were produced. The disc was released in South Korea, Taiwan, Hong Kong, and Japan.

The Mandarin version of "Scandal" was nominated for Top 10 Gold Songs at the Hong Kong TVB8 Awards, presented by television station TVB8, in 2006.

== Release and promotion ==
Scandal was recorded and produced in South Korea under SM Entertainment. Kangta & Vanness debuted the music of Scandal at the 2006 MTV Asia Awards in Bangkok, Thailand on 2006 May, during which they performed the album's title track during the ceremony closing. They officially launched the album at "The 1st Showcase Scandal" on 2006 May at Yonsei University in Seoul, South Korea, at which they performed "Scandal" and "127 Days." On 2006 May, Scandal was released by SM Entertainment in South Korea. It contained five Korean-language songs plus the title track also in English. A music video for "Scandal" was released, which showcased a dance battle between Kangta and Vanness, and featured Korean singer Lina, from Korean girl group The Grace (band). Later, a music video for "127 Days" was also released, featuring Lina's bandmate Stephanie.

On 2006 June, Scandal was released in Taiwan and Hong Kong, and soon thereafter in Japan, by Sony Music Taiwan. These releases featured a different cover, Mandarin-language versions of four songs found on the original release, plus a replacement of the song "Faith..." with "One Step." Some versions also came with bonus items such as a DVD containing the "Scandal" music video and footage from "The 1st Showcase Scandal" or merchandise from F4, the Taiwanese boyband of which Vanness is a member. Some releases also omitted the English version of "Scandal." Concurrently, in South Korea the "Repackage" version of Scandal was released. It featured a third cover and contained a track listing identical to the overseas versions, plus a DVD containing Korean and Mandarin versions of the music videos for "Scandal" and "127 Days," album jacket photography footage, and scenes from the making of the "127 Days" music video.

The "Commemorative Collectible" edition of Scandal was released outside Korea on 2006 August, and was identical to Korea's "Repackage" edition. Kangta & Vanness continued to promote Scandal across Asia throughout 2006.

== Release ==
- May 19, 2006 (South Korea)
- June 18, 2006 (Taiwan), (Hong Kong), (repackage)
- July 4, 2006 (Japan)
- August 13, 2006 (collection)

== Track listing ==
Scandal track listing
No.	Title	Lyrics	Music	Arrangement	Length
1.	"Scandal"	Vanness; Yoo Young-jin	Yoo Han-jin; Yoo Young-jin	Yoo Han-jin; Yoo Young-jin	3:36
2.	"127 Days"	Kangta	Kangta	Kangta	4:04
3.	"Good Vibration"	Vanness; Kee & Kenith; Yoo Young-jin	Yoo Young-jin	Yoo Young-jin	4:11
4.	"One Day"	Kangta	Kangta	Kangta	4:10
5.	"Faint" (한걸음)	Kangta	Rui Ye; Michael Wong	Ahn Ik-soo	3:44
6.	"Scandal" (English version)	Vanness	Yoo Han-jin; Yoo Young-jin	Yoo Han-jin; Yoo Young-jin	3:36
Total length:					23:21

== Credits and personnel ==
Credits adapted from the EP's liner notes.

Studio

- SM Booming System – recording, mixing (track 1, 3, 6)
- KT Studio – recording (track 2, 4–5), mixing (track 2, 4)
- SM Blue Ocean Studio – recording (track 2, 4)
- Studio-T a.k.a. T-Studio – recording (track 2–3, 5)
- SM Yellow Tail Studio – mixing (track 4)
- SM Concert Hall Studio – recording, mixing (track 5)
- Sonic Korea – mastering (all tracks)

Personnel

- SM Entertainment – executive producer
- Lee Soo-man – producer
- Kangta & Vanness – vocals (all tracks)
  - Kangta – producer, composition, arrangement, synthesizer, programming, recording, mixing (track 2, 4), lyrics, vocal directing (track 2, 4–5)
  - Vanness – lyrics, background vocals (track 1, 3, 6)
- Yoo Young-jin – producer, composition, arrangement, vocal directing, background vocals, recording, mixing (track 1, 3, 6), lyrics (track 1, 3)
- Yoo Han-jin – producer, composition, arrangement (track 1, 6)
- Kee & Kenith – lyrics (track 3)
- Rui Ye – composition (track 5)
- Michael Wong – composition (track 5)
- Ahn Ik-soo – producer, arrangement (track 5)
- Kim Hyun-ah – background vocals (track 1, 6)
- Han Won-jong – background vocals (Note: Han Won-jong was credited as chorus vocals in track 5, which similarly to background vocals.) (track 5)
- Sam Lee – guitar (track 2, 4–5)
- Min Jae-hyun – bass (track 2)
- Lee Tae-yoon – bass (track 4–5)
- Song Kwang-sik – piano (track 2), Rhodes (track 3), keyboards (track 4), strings conducting, strings arrangement (track 2, 5)
- Shim Sang-won – strings conducting (track 3)
- K Strings – strings (track 2–3, 5)
- Heo Jeong-hoe a.k.a. KAT – recording (track 2, 4–5)
- Lee Seong-ho – recording, mixing (track 2, 4)
- Kim Dong-hoon – recording (track 2–3, 5)
- Park Dong-won – recording (track 2–3, 5)
- Nam Koong-jin – recording, mixing (track 5)
- Jeon Hoon – mastering (all tracks)

== Charts ==
=== Monthly charts ===
Monthly chart performance for Scandal
Chart (2006)	Peak position
South Korean Albums (RIAK)	8
