= Kim Isak =

- Born: Ida Dene Simmons; May 25, 1985 (age 41); Frankfurt, Germany
- Education: Korea Kent Foreign School
- Occupations: Singer; actress
- Years active: 2002–present
- Musical career
- Genres: K-pop; R&B
- Instrument: Vocals
- Years active: 2002–2004
- Label: SM
- Formerly of: Isak N Jiyeon; SM Town

Korean name
- Hangul: 김이삭
- RR: Gim Isak
- MR: Kim Isak

Ida Dene Simmons (born May 25, 1985) better known as Kim Isak, is a German-born American singer and actress based in South Korea. She was a member of South Korean K-pop duo Isak N Jiyeon from 2002 to 2004. She left SM Entertainment in 2012. She has been a VJ for Pops in Seoul on Arirang TV and is now a DJ for "Kpoppin" on Arirang Radio.

== Early life ==
Kim Isak was born Ida Dene Simmons on May 25, 1985, in Frankfurt, Germany. She left Germany and moved to Kansas with her mother. She left Kansas when she was 4 1/2 years old to move to California and lived there until 1999. She emigrated to Korea later to learn about heritage and explore her music career in Korean pop music. Isak lived in a mostly white community with her mother.

Upon arrival in Korea, she attended the Korea Kent Foreign School, where her classmates and friends included Jessica Jung and Tiffany Young, the two future Korean American founding members of Girls' Generation. Tiffany lived with Isak initially when she moved to Seoul from Diamond Bar, California at the age of 15. Owing to their shared history and friendship, she has interviewed the duo mostly in English for Arirang's Pops in Seoul.

=== Isak N Jiyeon (2002–2004) ===
On September 3, 2002, Kim Isak debuted as a member of duo Isak N Jiyeon with release of album Tell Me Baby. The duo officially disbanded in 2004.

== Filmography ==
=== Television dramas ===
Year	Title	Role	Notes	Network
2007–2008	Unstoppable Marriage	Aida	Supporting role	KBS

=== Musical theater ===
Year	Title	Role	Notes
2008	The Life		
2011	Spring Awakening	Ilse	Adaptation from German musical Frank Wedekind

=== Broadcasting activities ===
- 2008: Arirang TV Pops in Seoul VJ
- 2012: Arirang Radio Kpoppin DJ

=== Music video appearances ===
- 2007: Super Junior-T – "Rokkugo"
