= Tell Me Baby (album) =

Studio album by Isak N Jiyeon
- Released: September 3, 2002
- Recorded: 2002
- Genres: K-pop, pop, R&B, experimental, dance, CCM
- Length: 45:46
- Language: Korean
- Label: SM Entertainment
- Producer: Lee Soo Man

Isak N Jiyeon chronology
Tell Me Baby (2002)	2002 Winter Vacation in SMTown.com – My Angel My Light (2002)

Singles from Tell Me Baby
- 1. "Tell Me Baby"; 2. "One"; 3. "The Sign"; 4. "C.B.T.M. (Come Back To Me)"

Tell Me Baby is the debut and only Korean studio album by South Korean duo Isak N Jiyeon, a new 2002 group from SM Entertainment, released on September 3, 2002.

== Overview ==
On the Autumn of 2002, the newest R&B Duo Isak N Jiyeon debuted with dark voices through their debut single and album of same name "Tell Me Baby". The album was the first and only album by Isak N Jiyeon before they disbanded.

== Track listing ==
No.	Title	Lyrics	Music	Arrangement	Length
1.	"C.B.T.M. (Come Back To Me)"	Lee Jung Min	Lee Jung Kyu	Lee Jung Kyu, Choi Moon Kyu	3:02
2.	"Tell Me Baby"	Shin Danbi, Kim Joong Woo	Kim Joong Woo, Jay Kim	Jay Kim	4:45
3.	"One"	Jung Yeon Joon	Jung Yeon Joon, Mad Soul Child	Mad Soul Child	4:32
4.	"The Sign"	Kenzie	Kenzie	Kenzie	3:51
5.	"The Way I Love U"	Young H. Kim	Young H. Kim	Young H. Kim	3:35
6.	"널 위해서라면 (Everything For You)"	Shin Danbi	Jay Kim	Jay Kim	4:41
7.	"Easy Come Easy Go"	Hong Ji Yoo	Benny Bellamacina, Bruce Elliot-Smith, Dennis Verrios, Jamie Hardwick	Kim Ho Hyun	3:18
8.	"Bad, Good Thing"	Kim Dong Hyun	Jeff Vincent and Susan Pomerantz	Jeff Vincent and Susan Pomerantz	3:18
9.	"My Wish"	Jung Yeon Joon	Jung Yeon Joon, Mad Soul Child	Mad Soul Child	4:44
10.	"Double"	Lee Ahn	Shin Sung Ho	Shin Sung Ho	3:23
11.	"I Don't Know How"	Jung Yeon Joon	Jung Yeon Joon, Mad Soul Child	Mad Soul Child	3:22
12.	"Pray For You"	Baek Chae Won	Campbell Warryn, Atkins Treana, Atkins Erica	Kwak Young Joon	3:15
Total length:					45:46
