= Yuta (Japanese singer) =

Japanese singer (born 1995)

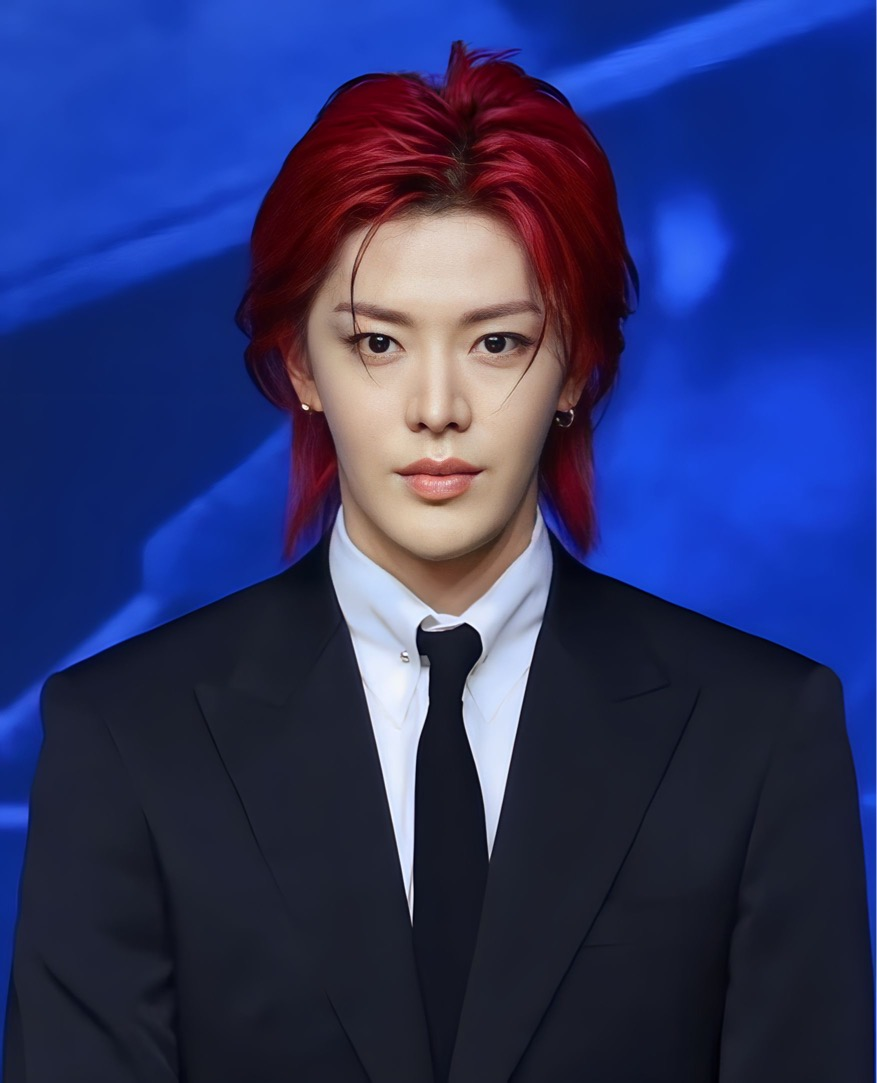
- Yuta in October 2023
- Born: Yuta Nakamoto; October 26, 1995 (age 30); Kadoma, Osaka, Japan
- Occupations: Singer; songwriter; actor; dancer; radio host
- Musical career
- Genres: K-pop; rock
- Instrument: Vocals
- Years active: 2013–present
- Labels: SM; Avex Trax; Capitol
- Member of: NCT; NCT 127; NCT U; SM Town
- Formerly of: SM Rookies
- Website: Official website

Japanese name
- Kanji: 中本悠太
Transcriptions
- Romanization: Nakamoto Yūta

Korean name
- Hangul: 나 유타
Transcriptions
- Revised Romanization: Na Yuta
- McCune–Reischauer: Na Yut'a

Yuta Nakamoto (中本悠太, Nakamoto Yūta; born October 26, 1995), known professionally as Yuta (Korean: 유타, Japanese: ユウタ), is a Japanese singer-songwriter, actor, dancer and radio host based in South Korea. He is a member of the South Korean boy group NCT, debuting in the group's second fixed sub-unit NCT 127 in 2016 and in the group's first rotational sub-unit NCT U in 2020. Yuta made his solo debut on October 3, 2024, with the extended play (EP) Depth.

== Early life ==
Yuta was born on October 26, 1995, in Kadoma, Osaka, Japan. He has an older sister and a younger sister. He graduated from Yashima Gakuen University International High School. Yuta played soccer from ages five to 16 and wanted to become a professional footballer, a dream he gave up to pursue a career as an idol.

== Career ==
=== 2011–2015: Pre-debut activities ===
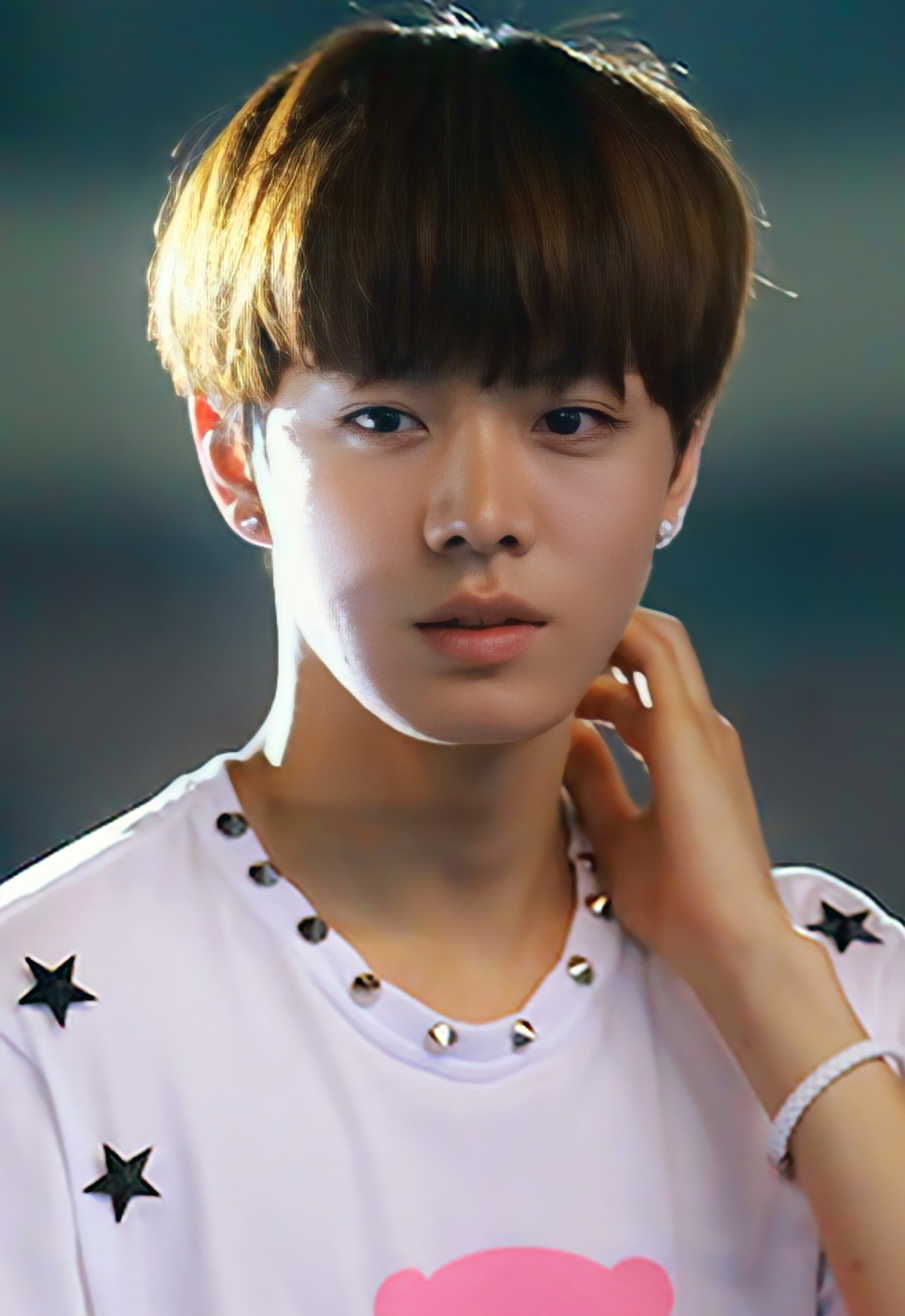
Yuta performing at SMTown Live World Tour IV in 2014

Yuta became interested in an idol career in 2011 after watching TVXQ on television. He attended multiple auditions despite not having any background in singing or dancing. In 2011, he participated in an audition program, Juice Winter Collection. In 2012, he participated in SM Entertainment's first global audition without the permission of his parents and was one of three out of 10,000 participants to pass. When he was 16, he participated in a month-long training camp in Seoul during the summer. On December 23, 2013, he was introduced as a member of SM Rookies, a pre-debut team of trainees under SM Entertainment.

As part of the SM Rookies program, in August 2014, Yuta appeared on Exo 90:2014, an Mnet-produced show starring label mates Exo, where they danced to K-pop songs from the '90s, and participated in the music video remake of H.O.T.'s "Hope" and Jo Sung-mo's "Do You Know". In July 2015, Yuta appeared as the Japanese representative on Abnormal Summit, a show with a panel of non-Korean men residing in South Korea, debating Korean culture but left the show to focus on his debut in December 2015.

=== 2016–2019: Debut with NCT 127 ===
He starred in the first season of NCT's reality show NCT Life, which partly documented SMROOKIES’s pre-debut concert the SMRookies Show in Bangkok, Thailand airing from April 16 to May 2, 2016. He also starred in the second season of the show, that features the members touring around Seoul and completing missions, which aired from May 21 - June 11.

On July 2, 2016, Yuta was announced as a member of the NCT team, under the second sub-unit, NCT 127, in which he debuted with their single "Fire Truck" on July 6, 2016. Three days later, they released their first mini-album, NCT #127.

From November 2016 to January 2017, he appeared on TV Chosun's Idol Party, in which comedians Park Mi-sun and Lee Bong-won become a family, adopting him and Sorn of CLC as their children. He hosted the Chuseok special episode of the 2019 Idol Star Athletics Championships alongside Leeteuk, Dahyun, Johnny, Jaehyun and Mark.

=== 2020–2023: NCT 2020, radio program and acting ===
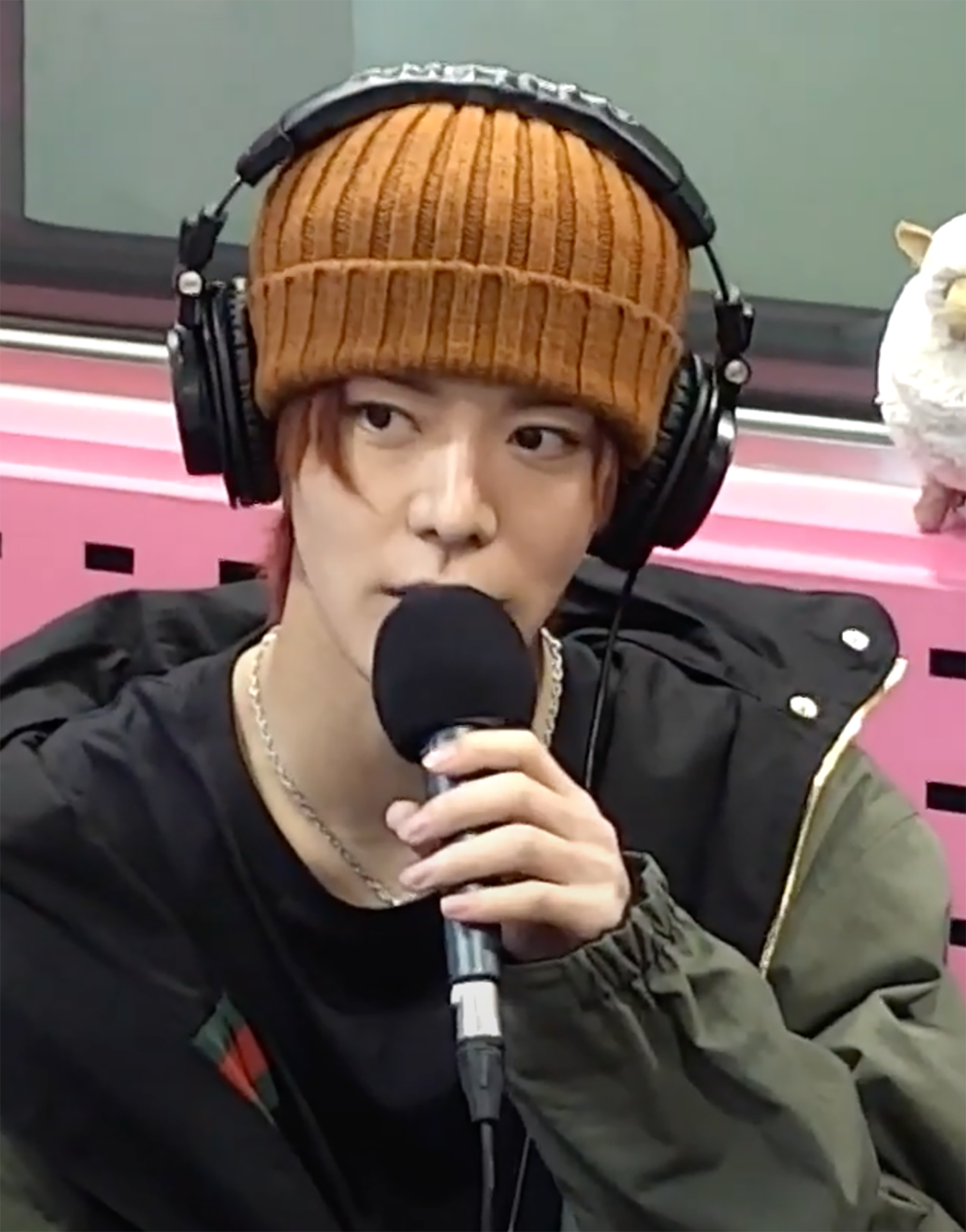
Yuta at SBS Radio on October 27, 2021

In September 2020, NCT's two-part second studio album, NCT 2020 Resonance, was announced. He appeared on the tracks "Dancing In The Rain", "Faded In My Last Song", "From Home", "Work It" and "Raise the Roof". On November 24, 2020, it was announced that Yuta would host a two-month weekly radio program, NCT 127 no: ユウタの YUTA at Home, on InterFM897 to promote NCT 127's second Japanese EP, Loveholic, in Japan, which topped the Oricon Albums Chart. On March 19, 2021, it was announced that the broadcast would be extended and converted into a regular program.

Since 2021, Yuta appeared in numerous Japanese magazines such as PMC, Ginger, Numéro Tokyo, GQ Japan, and Elle Japan. In June 2021, a Tom Ford Neroli Portofino endorsement with Yuta was announced through Vogue Japan's YouTube channel. In September 2022, Yuta made his acting debut in the film High&Low The Worst X (Cross). In October 2022, Yuta was featured on Forbes Japan's 30 Under 30 list. In March 2023, it was announced that he was cast in the live-action adaptation of the web manga Play It Cool, Guys, which will be broadcast on April 14.

=== 2024–present: Solo debut ===
On August 5, 2024, it was announced that Yuta would make his solo debut with the release of his first EP Depth on November 13. On October 3, the EP was available for digital download and the music video for its lead single "Off the Mask" was released. Starting from October 5, his debut showcase tour Hope commenced in Fukuoka, and was held across 5 cities in Japan before ending in his hometown Kadoma on the 27th. His photobook Now was later released on October 17 to commemorate his solo debut. Yuta released his first Japanese single "Twisted Paradise" on May 14, 2025.

In 2026, Yuta performed "Play Back", which was used as the second opening theme to Kamen Rider Zeztz.

== Discography ==
=== Studio albums ===
List of studio albums, showing selected details, selected chart positions, and sales figures
Title	Details	Peak chart positions		Sales
Title	Details	JPN	JPN Hot	Sales
Persona	Released: October 26, 2025; Labels: SM, Avex Trax; Formats: CD, digital download, streaming	4	30	JPN: 17,110

=== Extended plays ===
List of extended plays, showing selected details, selected chart positions, and sales figures
Title	Details	Peak chart positions		Sales
Title	Details	JPN	JPN Hot	Sales
Depth	Released: October 3, 2024; Labels: SM, Avex Trax; Formats: CD, digital download, streaming	4	4	JPN: 35,154

=== Singles ===
List of singles, showing year released, selected chart positions, and name of the album
Title	Year	Peak chart positions		Album
Title	Year	JPN	JPN Hot	Album
"Off the Mask"	2024	—	99	Depth
"Twisted Paradise"	2025	3	19	Persona
"Ember"	2025	—	—	Persona
"Play Back"	2026	8	35	Non-album single
"Dreams Never Sleep"	2026	—	—	Non-album single
"—" denotes releases that did not chart or were not released in that region.

== Filmography ==
=== Film ===
Year	Title	Role	Notes	Ref.
2022	High&Low The Worst X (Cross)	Ryo Suzaki		
2026	The Specials	Kiryu		

=== Television series ===
Year	Title	Role	Ref.
2023	Play It Cool, Guys	Hayate Ichikura	

=== Television shows ===
Year	Title	Role	Ref.
2011	Juice Winter Collection	Participant	
2015	Non-Summit	Japanese representative	
2016	Idol Party	Cast member	

=== Radio ===
Year	Title	Role	Ref.
2020–present	NCT 127 ユウタの YUTA at Home	DJ	

== Bibliography ==
=== Photobooks ===
Title	Release date	Publisher	Ref.
Yuta at Home Official Book vol. 1	July 1, 2022	Mogura Books	
Now	October 17, 2024	Gentosha	
