= Isak N Jiyeon =

South Korean music duo

Isak N Jiyeon 이삭 N 지연
- Origin: Seoul, South Korea
- Genres: K-pop; R&B
- Years active: 2002–2004
- Labels: SM
- Past members: Isak; Jiyeon
- Website: isaknjiyeon.smtown.com (archived)

Isak N Jiyeon (이삭 N 지연) was a South Korean R&B duo formed by SM Entertainment in 2002. The duo released one album, Tell Me Baby, in September 2002 before disbanding two years later following Isak’s departure. Later on, Jiyeon joined the line-up of SM's new girl group The Grace which debuted in 2005 while Isak continued to do a variety of work, such as being DJ and VJ for Arirang TV, MC work for various networks, and taking on small acting roles on network television.

== Members ==
- Kim Isak (김이삭)
- Lee Jiyeon (이지연)

== Discography ==
=== Studio album ===
- Tell Me Baby, released September 2002

=== Compilations ===
- 2003 Summer Vacation in SMTOWN.com
- 2004 Summer Vacation in SMTOWN.com
