= Depth (EP) =

- Digital cover

EP by Yuta
- Released: October 3, 2024
- Recorded: 2024
- Studios: 821 Sound (Seoul); Doobdoob (Seoul); GlueBlue (Seoul); Prime Sound Studio Form (Tokyo)
- Genre: Rock
- Length: 20:50
- Languages: Japanese; English
- Labels: SM; Avex Trax

Yuta chronology
Depth (2024)	Persona (2025)

Singles from Depth
- 1. "Off the Mask" Released: October 3, 2024

Depth is the debut extended play (EP) by Japanese singer Yuta released on October 3, 2024, by SM Entertainment and Avex Trax. Yuta wrote and produced six of the EP's seven tracks, including its lead single, "Off the Mask". The EP's lyrics see the singer exploring themes of rebirth, growth, and a desire to show a different side of himself from the K-pop idol persona portrayed in his boy band, NCT 127. Upon its physical release in November 2024, the Depth debuted at number four on Japan's Oricon Albums Chart, and was promoted by the singer with a showcase tour throughout Japan.

== Background and release ==
As the first Japanese artist to debut under SM Entertainment, Yuta became a member of South Korean boy band NCT and its first sub-unit NCT 127 in 2016 with their first EP NCT#127. The band went on to become SM's best-selling act, and one of the best-selling K-pop acts of all time with over 40 million albums sold across all units.

In August 2024, SM announced that Yuta would be embarking on a tour of Japan in October, and that he would be debuting as a soloist in the second half of the year. Depth was first announced on September 6, 2024, in a post on NCT's official Japanese X account. The post communicated that the album would be released on November 13, and included a video that revealed the EP's track listing. Another post followed on October 1, announcing that the EP, along with a music video for the lead single "Off the Mask", would be released digitally on October 3, in advance of Yuta's tour commencing on October 5. A teaser video for "Off the Mask" was released the next day.

Depth was released digitally to music download and streaming services on October 3, 2024, along with the music video for "Off the Mask" A physical release of the EP followed on November 13, in four different editions: Internal, Superficial, Existential, and a standard edition. With the EP's release, Yuta became the fifth NCT member to debut as a soloist, following Taeyong, Ten, Doyoung, and Jaehyun.

== Composition ==
A departure from the typical output of NCT and NCT 127 which is largely hip-hop, Depth is primarily a rock album. Depth comprises seven tracks, with Yuta contributing lyrics to six of the seven tracks, along with participating in composition and production.

"Off the Mask"
"Off the Mask" sees the singer explore rock, metal, and screaming singing techniques.

The first song, "Last Song", is a rock ballad with lyrical content about growth coming from one's past mistakes and regrets. The EP's second track, "Off the Mask", serves as the EP's lead single. The song is described as the most intense rock and metal song on the EP, and sees Yuta sing about his desire to "take off the mask" and show a different side of himself compared to his usual K-pop boy group persona. Throughout the song, the singer employs screaming and scratching vocal technique. "Save You" is a song described as "anthemic" song about living on one's own terms.

The EP's fourth track, "Bad Euphoria", is the only track that Yuta did not write lyrics to. The song is influenced by British rock music and contains lyrical content exploring desires and disregarding stigmas. "Prisoner" is described as a track that contains "sweeping rock melodies" and is noted as a favourite among the singer's fanbase for its lyrics about being free from expectations. The lyrics for "Goodbye" were written by the singer alone in fifteen minutes.

"Butterfly", the final track on the EP, is a song that was originally performed on NCT 127's Neo City – The Link tour beginning in 2021. The song is subtitled "Depth ver.", and received a more rock influenced production compared to the original electronic version performed on the tour. The song speaks of the growing pains a butterfly experiences during its metamorphosis.

== Promotion ==
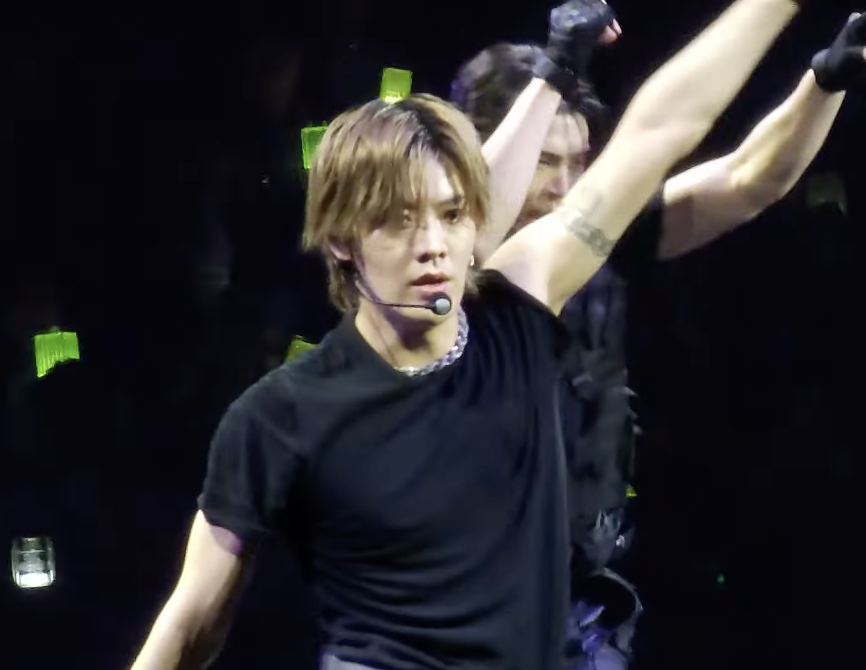
Yuta performing in 2025

Yuta promoted Depth with his first tour, entitled "Hope". The tour began on October 5 in Fukuoka, and continued throughout Japan, with additional shows in Aichi and Tokyo, before culminating with two performances in Osaka on October 26 and 27. All shows on the tour were sold out.

The tour's setlist included all songs from Depth, and covers of songs from various Japanese musicians, including "Glamorous Sky" by Mika Nakashima and L'Arc-en-Ciel's "Shinshoku (Lose Control)". Yuta also performed two unreleased songs: "Two of Us", and "New World". The shows also displayed behind-the-scenes content from the creation of Depth and audience engagement through question-and-answer sessions.

== Critical reception ==
Depth received a positive critical reception. In a feature for Grammy.com, writer Tamar Herman wrote that "Depth ultimately lives up to its titular promise, delving deeper than ever before into Yuta’s artistry and lyrical philosophy.", while noting that the singer's "confidence and drive has played out in a way that feels earnest to his personality as the punkish, humorous and artsy member of NCT 127."

In a piece for Cherry Chu Magazine, contributor Molly Wilson wrote that "Depth is a refreshing, distinctive solo debut that sets Yuta apart as an artist in his own league", and noted that the singer showed off "impressive vocal abilities" through metal screams and raspy vocal techniques on songs such as "Off the Mask" and "Save You".

== Commercial performance ==
Depth debuted at number four on Japan's Oricon Albums Chart for the week ending November 17, 2024, with total sales of 35,154 copies. The following week, the album fell to number 45 on the chart, with sales of 992. On the month-end tally for that chart, Depth charted at number 15 for the month of November, moving a total of 36,366 copies. On the Oricon Combined Albums Chart, which tracks digital downloads, streams, in addition to physical sales, the EP debuted at number five.

On the Billboard Japan Hot Albums chart, Depth debuted at number 20 for the week ending October 9, 2025. Following the EP's physical release, the album re-entered the chart, peaking at number four for the week ending November 20.

The EP's lead single, "Off the Mask", entered the Billboard Japan Hot 100 for the week of the EP's physical release, peaking at number 99.

== Track listing ==
Depth track listing
No.	Title	Lyrics	Music	Arrangement	Length
1.	"Last Song"	Yuta; Soichiro Oura	Yuta; Kevin D; Ebenezer; Charlotte Wilson; Wondertaker	Yuta; Kevin D; Ebenezer; Wilson	3:22
2.	"Off the Mask"	Yuta; Kentz	Yuta; Kevin D; Stephen Lee; Wxne	Yuta; Kevin D; Lee; Wxne	2:50
3.	"Save You"	Yuta; Kentz	Yuta; Kevin D; 1000; Helixx; Uji	Yuta; Helixx; Kevin D	3:13
4.	"Bad Euphoria"	Rose Blueming	Akira; Jonghan; Kaizen	Akira; Kaizen	2:53
5.	"Prisoner"	Yuta; Kentz	Kevin "Thrasher" Gruft; Curtis Peoples; Charlotte Sands	Gruft	2:47
6.	"Goodbye"	Yuta	Samson; Baatz; Overmensch	Baatz; Overmensch	3:15
7.	"Butterfly" (Depth ver.)	Yuta; Kamihate	Yuta; Kevin D; Dashorn; Kamihate; Uji; Akira; Kaizen; Overmensch	Yuta; Kevin D; Akira; Kaizen; Overmensch	2:30
Total length:					20:50

== Charts ==
=== Weekly charts ===
Weekly chart performance for Depth
Chart (2024)	Peak position
Japanese Albums (Oricon)	4
Japanese Combined Albums (Oricon)	5
Japanese Hot Albums (Billboard Japan)	4

=== Monthly charts ===
Monthly chart performance for Depth
Chart (2024)	Position
Japanese Albums (Oricon)	15

== Release history ==
Release history for Depth
Region	Date	Format	Label	Ref.
Various	October 3, 2024	Digital download; streaming	SM; Avex	
Japan	November 13, 2024	CD	SM; Avex	
