= Kangta & Vanness =

South Korean pop duo

- Origin: South Korea; Taiwan
- Years active: 2006–2007
- Labels: SM Entertainment (South Korea); Sony BMG (Hong Kong, Taiwan, Japan)
- Past members: Kangta, Vanness Wu
- Website: Kangta & Vanness

Kangta & Vanness (Korean: 강타와 & 바네스; Chinese: 七炫和建豪; stylized in all caps), was a one-off pop duo composed of Korean singer Kangta formerly of H.O.T and Taiwanese singer Vanness Wu of F4 fame. They formed in 2006 and had released one studio album, Scandal.

== Formation and promotion ==
The collaboration was speculated since the 15th Golden Melody Awards on May 8, 2004, in Taiwan, and was officially announced on April 27, 2006, with the stated purpose of "sweeping the Asian music market." The duo made its official debut performing at the MTV Asia Awards on May 6, followed by "Kangta & Vanness: The First Showcase 'Scandal'" at Yonsei University in Seoul on May 10, at which the duo performed their songs "Scandal" and "127 Days."

Kangta & Vanness' debut studio album, Scandal, was released on May 19, 2006, in South Korea, with localized versions following in Japan, Hong Kong, and Taiwan. A repackaged featuring Mandarin versions of the single album's songs was released, as well. Music videos for "Scandal" and "127 Days" were filmed and released in both the Mandarin and Korean languages.

Kangta & Vanness held autograph sessions for fans in Daegu and Busan in South Korea, and later traveled to Hong Kong for an autograph session at the APM Mall and a performance at the Hong Kong Trade and Exhibition Center in Kowloon Bay on July 27–28, 2006. They also performed in Beijing, China, on September 22–23, 2006, at the Great Hall of the People. The performers' "high recognition in China", quoted by KBS World, was cited as the reason for allowing their performance on "the capital's grand stage". In 2007, Kangta & Vanness performed at SM Entertainment's "SM Town Summer Concert" at the Olympic Park in Seoul on June 30 and July 1.

== Discography ==
- Scandal (2006)

== Awards ==
Year	Award-Giving Body	Category	Work	Result
2006	13th Korea Entertainment Awards	Korean Wave All-Star Award	-	Won
2006	Seoul Music Awards	Hallyu Special Award	-	Won
