= Lina (entertainer) =

South Korean singer and actress (born 1984)

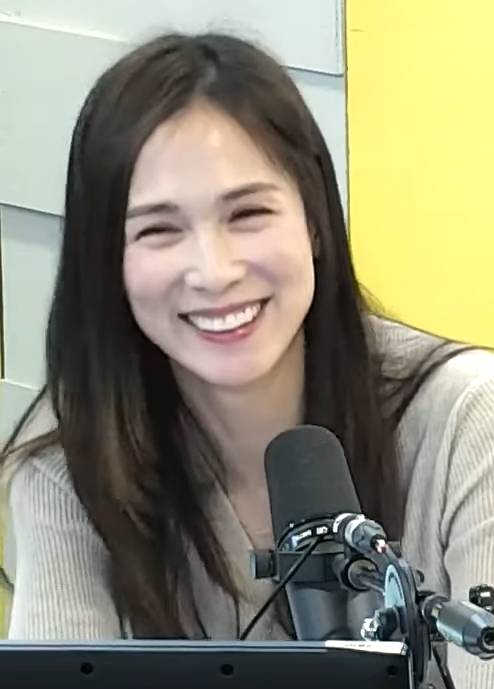
- Lina in 2023
- Born: Lee Ji-yeon; February 18, 1984 (age 42); South Korea
- Education: Myongji University
- Occupations: Singer; actress
- Years active: 2002–present
- Agent: Goodman Story Entertainment
- Spouse: Jang Seung-jo (m. 2014)
- Children: 2
- Musical career
- Genres: K-pop; R&B; a cappella
- Instruments: Vocals; piano
- Years active: 2002–2010
- Label: SM
- Member of: The Grace
- Formerly of: Isak N Jiyeon; SM Town

Korean name
- Hangul: 이지연
- RR: I Jiyeon
- MR: I Chiyŏn

Stage name
- Hangul: 린아
- RR: Rina
- MR: Rina

Lee Ji-yeon (Korean: 이지연; born February 18, 1984), known professionally as Lina (린아), is a South Korean singer and musical theatre actress. She was a part of the short-lived Korean R&B duo Isak N Jiyeon during 2002. After the duo disbanded in 2004, Lina eventually became a member of girl group The Grace in 2005.

Following The Grace's indefinite hiatus in 2010, Lina established herself as a musical actress, notably through her participation in the original and Korean versions of stage musicals including Fame, Moon Embracing the Sun, Jekyll & Hyde, Notre-Dame de Paris, Sweeney Todd: The Demon Barber of Fleet Street and Les Misérables.

== Personal life ==
On July 25, 2014, Lina confirmed that she was dating musical actor, Jang Seung-jo for two years. They had been seeing each other since the musical "Temptation of Wolves". They got married on November 22, 2014, in a private wedding. The two welcomed their first child in September 2018. On September 28, 2021, the agency announced that Lina is pregnant with her second child. On December 31, 2021, Lina gave birth to the couple's second child, a daughter.

== Discography ==
=== Soundtrack appearances ===
Title	Year	Peak chart positions	Sales	Album
Title	Year	KOR	Sales	Album
"Answer Me" (with Sung Doo Seop & Shinshin Kim)	2013	—	—N/a	Murder Ballad OST
"You Belong to Me" (with Sung Doo Seop)	2013	—	—N/a	Murder Ballad OST
"Little By Little – Reprise" (with Shinshin Kim)	2013	—	—N/a	Murder Ballad OST
"You Belong to Me – Reprise" (with Shinshin Kim, Sung Doo Seop & Moon Jin Ah)	2013	—	—N/a	Murder Ballad OST
"Finale" (with Shinshin Kim, Sung Doo Seop & Moon Jin Ah)	2013	—	—N/a	Murder Ballad OST
"Last Love" (마지막 사랑) (as Ballerina Created by Ballet)	2017	—	—N/a	King of Mask Singer: Episode 102
"The Star" (그 별) (with Han Ji-sang)	2019	—	—N/a	Ben-Hur: The Musical OST
"The Light of Catacombs" (카타콤의 빛) (with Woohyuk Min, Ensemble)	2019	—	—N/a	Ben-Hur: The Musical OST
"How We Used to Be" (그날의 우리) (with Kai, Seo Ji-young, Eunsoo Moon)	2019	—	—N/a	Ben-Hur: The Musical OST
"—" denotes releases that did not chart or were not released in that region.

=== Other appearances ===
Title	Year	Peak chart positions	Sales	Album
Title	Year	KOR	Sales	Album
"I Dream of You"	2003	—	—N/a	2003 Winter Vacation in SMTOWN.com
"Rock'n' Roll Star"	2006	—	—N/a	Sweet Flower
"—" denotes releases that did not chart or were not released in that region.

== Filmography ==
=== Television series ===
Year	Title	Role	Network	Notes/Ref.
2012	Dream of the Emperor	Kim Munhui	KBS	
2020	Chocolate	Woman in the museum	JTBC	

=== Musical theatre ===
Year	Title	Role
2011	The March of the Youth	Oh Young-shim
2011	Temptation of Wolves	Jung Han-kyung
2011–2012	Fame	Serena Katz
2013–2014	Murder Ballad	Sarah
2014	Moon Embracing the Sun	Heo Yeon-woo
2014–2015	Jekyll & Hyde	Lucy Harris
2015	Man of La Mancha	Aldonza
2015–2016	The Orchestra Pit	Harp player
2016	Newsies	Katherine Plumber
2016	Notre-Dame de Paris	Esmeralda
2016–2017	The Count of Monte Cristo	Mercedes
2017	Cyrano de Bergerac The Musical	Roxanne
2019	Ben-Hur	Esther
2019–2020	Sweeney Todd: The Demon Barber of Fleet Street	Mrs. Lovett
2020–2021	The Count of Monte Cristo (10th Anniversary)	Mercedes
2022–2023	Sweeney Todd: The Demon Barber of Fleet Street	Miss Lovett
2023–2024	Les Misérables	Fantine
2024	Hadestown	Persephone
2024	If/Then	Elizabeth Vaughn
2024–2025	Jekyll & Hyde	Lucy Harris
2025	Mrs. Doubtfire	Miranda Hillard
2026	Lempicka	Rafaela
