= A-Cha (song) =

Single by Super Junior

from the album A-Cha
- Language: Korean; Japanese
- Released: September 19, 2011
- Recorded: 2011
- Studio: SM Yellow Tail (Seoul)
- Genre: Electrohouse; rock
- Length: 3:18
- Label: SM; KMP
- Composers: Hitchhiker
- Lyricists: Kim Boo-min (KR); Leonn (JP)
- Producer: Hitchhiker

Super Junior singles chronology
"Mr. Simple" (2011)	"A-Cha" (2011)	"Santa U Are the One" (2011)

Music video
- "A-Cha" on YouTube

"A-Cha" is a song recorded by South Korean boy band Super Junior that was released on September 19, 2011, by their label SM Entertainment and distributed by KMP Holdings as the lead single for their fourth reissue album A-Cha, a reissue of the group's fifth studio album, Mr. Simple. The Japanese version of the track is featured on the group's debut Japanese studio album, Hero which was released in 2013.

== Background ==
Following the release of the Mr. Simple album in August 2011, Super Junior announced plans for album reissue called A-Cha along with its lead single of the same name on September 15. "A-Cha" was released on September 19, the same day as the reissue album's release.

== Composition ==
"A-Cha" features the vocals of nine active members — Leeteuk, Heechul, Yesung, Sungmin, Shindong, Eunhyuk, Donghae, Ryeowook, and Kyuhyun. Kangin was away on mandatory military service.

The song is based on electrohouse and rock which separated it from the group's existing dance songs such as "Sorry, Sorry" and "Bonamana" that were dubbed as "SJ Funky." The song's melody was composed and arranged by Hitchiker. It was composed in the key of D major with the tempo of 125 beats per minute.

Its lyrics were penned by Kim Boo-min, narrating the song akin to Alonso Quijano of the Don Quixote novel, a character trying to hold on to his wavering lover.

== Music video ==
The teaser for the music video was released on the evening of September 23 on SM Town's YouTube and Facebook pages. The full music video was released on the following day.

== Commercial performance ==
In South Korea, "A-Cha" peaked at number 15 on Gaon Digital Chart for the 40th week of 2011, ranging from September 18 to September 24 and peaked at number 19 on the Korea K-Pop Hot 100. It sold 710,531 units.

In the United States, on Billboard's World Digital Song Sales chart, "A-Cha" peaked on number 2, spending 10 weeks on the chart.

== Live performances ==
Super Junior debuted "A-Cha" live on MBC's Show! Music Core on September 23. The group performed the song during their appearances at KBS' Music Bank and SBS' Inkigayo on September 25.

The song is later included in the setlist of the group's debut world tour, Super Show 4.

== Charts ==
=== Weekly charts ===
Chart (2011)	Peak position
South Korea (Gaon)	15
South Korea K-pop Hot 100 (Billboard)	19
US (World Digital Song Sales) (Billboard)	2

== Credits and personnel ==
Credits adapted from album's liner notes.

Studio

- SM Yellow Tail Studio – recording, mixing
- Sonic Korea – mastering

Personnel

- SM Entertainment – executive producer
- Lee Soo-man – producer
- Super Junior – vocals
- Hitchiker – producer, composition, arrangement, vocal directing, background vocals, guitar, synthesizer, sound programming
- Kim Boo-min – Korean lyrics
- Leonn – Japanese lyrics
- Koo Jong-pil – recording, mixing
- Jeon Hoon – mastering

== Release history ==
Release history for "A-Cha"
Region	Date	Version	Format	Label
Various	September 19, 2011	Korean	Digital download; streaming	SM; KMP
Various	July 24, 2013	Japanese	Digital download; streaming	Avex Trax
