= Santa U Are the One =

Single by Super Junior with Zhou Mi and Henry

from the album 2011 Winter SMTown – The Warmest Gift
- Language: English
- Released: December 13, 2011
- Recorded: 2011
- Studio: SM Yellow Tail (Seoul)
- Genre: Christmas music
- Length: 3:37
- Label: SM; KMP
- Songwriter: Ove Andre Brenna
- Producer: BJJMusic

Super Junior singles chronology
| "A-Cha" (2011) | "Santa U Are the One" (2011) | "Opera" (2012) |

Music video
- "Santa U Are the One" on YouTube

"Santa U Are the One" is a Christmas song written and composed by the Norwegian songwriter Ove Andre Brenna. It was first made popular by the Korean boy band Super Junior.

== Background ==
"Santa U Are the One" is an uptempo and cheerful Christmas song. The song is a tribute to Santa Claus – stating that Santa is the greatest for bringing the world joy and presents.

== Artist releases ==
=== Super Junior (2011) ===
The song was the title track of SM Town's album 2011 Winter SMTown – The Warmest Gift. SM Town also released a video of the track featuring many of the entertainment companies' artists such as BoA, TVXQ, SHINee, Girls' Generation, Super Junior, Kangta, f(x), TRAX, The Grace, Zhang Liyin, and J-Min.

=== Alfred (2011) ===
The Swedish artist Alfred Olsson aka "Alfred" released the song as a digital Christmas single in Sweden and Norway for Christmas 2011. The song was especially popular on radio in Sweden, where around 30 radio channels played the song during December 2011.

=== Andrew Hotter (2020) ===
The Swedish Dj and artist Andrew Hotter released his own version of "Sana U are the One".

== Appearance in movies ==
=== The Perfect Holiday (2007) ===
The song was featured in the Christmas film Perfect Holiday in a scene where Benjamin (Morris Chestnut) is working as Santa in a shopping mall. The movie also stars Queen Latifah and Terrence Howard.

=== A Dennis the Menace Christmas (2007) ===
The song appeared in A Dennis the Menace Christmas starring Robert Wagner and Maxwell Perry Cotton. The song is featured in a scene where Mr. Wilson (Robert Wagner) goes Christmas shopping with the kids.

== Chart ==
Chart performance for "Santa U Are the One"
| Chart (2011) | Peak position |
|---|---|
| South Korea (Gaon) | 64 |

== Release history ==
Release history for "Santa U Are the One"
| Region | Date | Format | Label |
|---|---|---|---|
| Various | December 13, 2011 | Digital download; streaming | SM; KMP |
