= Ready for Your Love (disambiguation) =

"Ready for Your Love" is a 2014 single by Gorgon City featuring MNEK.

Ready for Your Love may also refer to:

- "Ready for Your Love" (J-Min song), a 2016 single by J-Min
- "Ready for Your Love", a 1961 single by Shep and the Limelites
- "Ready for Your Love", a 1979 song by Chapter 8 from the album Chapter 8
- "Ready for Your Love", a 1983 song by Mtume from Juicy Fruit
- Ready for Your Love, a 1984 album by Buddy Greco
- "Ready for Your Love", a 2002 song by Chantal Kreviazuk from What If It All Means Something
