= Let's Standing Show =

- Regular and digital cover

EP by Super Junior-L.S.S.
- Released: January 17, 2024
- Recorded: 2023
- Studio: Ingrid (Seoul)
- Genre: J-pop
- Length: 12:23
- Language: Japanese
- Label: Avex Trax
- Producer: Axel Bauer; Leeteuk; One Way; Nicklas Eklund

Singles from Let's Standing Show
- 1. "Close the Shutter" Released: July 5, 2023; 2. "Ceremony" Released: September 13, 2023

Let's Standing Show is the debut EP by South Korean trio Super Junior-L.S.S., a subgroup of the boy band Super Junior. It is a Japanese-language EP and released on January 17, 2024, by Avex Trax. The EP is supported by two previously released singles "Close the Shutter" and "Ceremony", both were released the previous year.

== Background ==
Super Junior-L.S.S. consists of Leeteuk, Siwon, and Shindong. The trio was introduced as Super Junior's sixth sub-unit in November 2022, by holding their first fan meeting under this new identity. Single "Close the Shutter" (シャッター閉めろ (Shattā shimero)) was released on July 5, 2023, to mark their debut.

During their "Super Junior-L.S.S. Let's Standing Show" fan meeting, they performed unreleased Japanese songs "New Road", "Ceremony", and "Old Skool", just few days after "Close the Shutter" was released. On September 12, they released an EDM single "Ceremony".

On November 28, Avex Trax announced that the trio will release their debut EP, eponymous with their fan meeting. Nearly a month later, the trio announced their first Asia solo concert "The Show: Th3ee Guys", to promote the EP, starting on February 3, 2024.

On January 17, 2024, the EP was released in Japan in physical format and available to be streamed on various global music platforms.

== Promotion ==
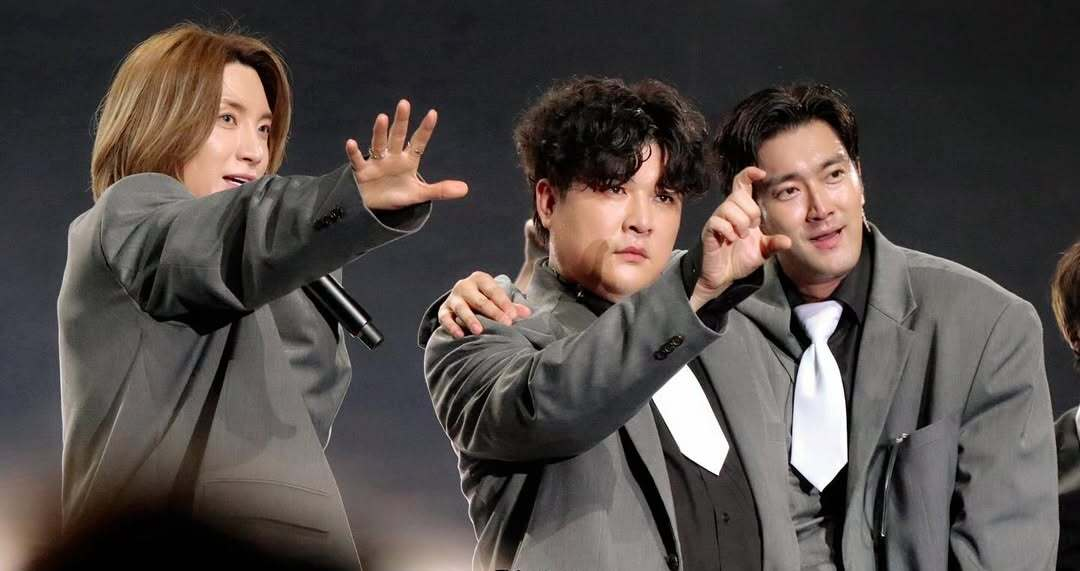
Super Junior-L.S.S. during their "Th33 Guys" concert in Hong Kong, in February 2024

Songs from the EP were featured in the setlist of the trio's "The Show: Th3ee Guys" concert tour which started on February 3.

== Track listing ==
Regular and digital edition track listing
No.	Title	Lyrics	Music	Arrangement	Length
1.	"New Road"	Hideo Toyosaki	Axel Bauer; Steven John Baruah; Alex Cassano	Axel Bauer	3:39
2.	"Ceremony"	Leeteuk; One Way; Yuki Fujiwara	Leeteuk; One Way	Leeteuk; One Way	3:13
3.	"Old Skool"	Akka	Nicklas Eklund; Fernstream; Ronnie Icon	Nicklas Eklund	2:40
4.	"Close the Shutter" (シャッター閉めろ (Shattā shimero))	Shindong; Prism Filter; Hideo Toyosaki; HeyFarmer; NiiHWA	Kim Ji-hoon; NiiHWA; Lee Seung-pil; HeyFarmer; Shindong		2:28
Total length:					12:23

Blu-ray edition
No.	Title	Lyrics	Music	Arrangement	Length
1.	"Superman"	Yoo Young-jin	Yoo Young-jin	Yoo Young-jin
2.	"New Road"	Hideo Toyosaki	Axel Bauer; Steven John Baruah; Alex Cassano	Axel Bauer
3.	"Ceremony"	Leeteuk; One Way; Yuki Fujiwara	Leeteuk; One Way	Leeteuk; One Way
4.	"Old Skool"	Akka	Nicklas Eklund; Fernstream; Ronnie Icon	Nicklas Eklund
5.	"Latte"	Leeteuk; One Way; Kinsha	One Way	One Way
6.	"Memories" (기억을 따라; Gieogeul Ttara; lit. 'Follow the memory')	Park Joon-soo; Lee Yoon-jong	Park Joon-soo	Park Joon-soo; Nile Lee
7.	"Andante"	Misfit	Leeteuk; Henry Lau; Q (Butterfly)	Q (Butterfly)
8.	"One More Chance" (비처럼 가지 마요; Bicheoreom gaji mayo; 'Don't go like the rain')	Lee Dong-hae; J-DUB	Lee Dong-hae; J-DUB	J-DUB
9.	"Close the Shutter" (シャッター閉めろ (Shattā shimero))	Shindong; Prism Filter; Hideo Toyosaki; HeyFarmer; NiiHWA	Kim Ji-hoon; NiiHWA; Lee Seung-pil; HeyFarmer; Shindong
10.	"Hairspray"	Leeteuk; One Way	Leeteuk; One Way
11.	"Dorothy" (도로시; Dorosi)	Kim Jin-ah	Lee Sang-jun	Cha Gil-wan
12.	"Miracle"	Yoon Hyo-sang	Tommy La Verdi; Daniel Pandher	Hwang Sung-jae

== Charts ==
Chart performance for Let's Standing Show
Chart (2024)	Peak position
Japan Albums (Oricon)	15
Japan Combined Albums (Oricon)	22
Japan Hot Albums (Billboard Japan)	13

== Release history ==
Release history for Let's Standing Show
Region	Date	Format	Label	Ref
Japan	January 17, 2024	CD; Blu-ray	Avex Trax	
Various	January 17, 2024	Digital download; streaming	Avex Trax	
South Korea	January 17, 2024	Digital download; streaming	SM; Kakao	
