= Super Show 4 =

2011–12 concert tour by Super Junior

- World tour by Super Junior
- Promotion poster for Super Show 4
- Associated album: Mr. Simple; A-Cha
- Start date: November 19, 2011
- End date: May 27, 2012
- Legs: 3
- No. of shows: 24
- Website: superjunior.smtown.com

Super Junior concert chronology
- Super Show 3 (2010–11); Super Show 4 (2011–12); Super Show 5 (2013–14)

Super Show 4 was the first live world concert tour and fourth international tour by South Korean boy band Super Junior, in support of their fifth studio album, Mr. Simple. The world tour commenced with two shows in Seoul in November 2011 and continued onto Japan, Taiwan, China, other Asian countries, and France.

On June 28, 2013, a live album, Super Show 4 Concert Album, of the concert held in Seoul was released. On August 8, 2013, a 3D film of the Seoul concert was released in 30 theaters across South Korea. The 3D concert movie plays out Super Junior’s Super Show 4 concert, part of its world tour that was held in May 2012 at the Olympic Park Gymnastics Stadium.

== Concerts ==
The two concerts in Osaka were played to a total audience of 80,000 people. In February, the group set records for the fastest selling concert in Taiwan and also the first overseas artist to hold four consecutive concerts at the Taipei Arena. In March, the group became the first Korean singers to hold two consecutive concerts in Macau, and broke the record for the biggest concert audience in Thailand, with 40,000 people. The French and Indonesian legs of the tour also marks the group's first solo concert in Paris, and Jakarta.

On March 29, 2012, Sydney based promoter JK Entertainment announced that Super Show 4 will be held on May 5 at the Allphones Arena. However its cancellation by the promoter was announced on April 16, due to the hospitalisation of the concert director requiring immediate medical treatment.

On April 23, 2012, SM Entertainment announced the addition of two encore concerts in Seoul on May 26 and 27. Tickets went on sale on April 26 along with special concert packages for overseas fans offered by SM Town Travel. The encore shows were played to an audience of 22,000 for three and a half hours.

For the second leg of the Japanese dates, 400,000 fans tried to buy tickets for the May 12 concert, as soon as they went on sale resulting in the addition of the May 13 concert. The two concerts were played to a total audience of 110,000 people.

== Setlist ==
South Korea (Opening Weekend)

Super Junior Intro

- "Intro: Underwater"
- "Superman"
- "Opera"
- "Twins"
- "Galjeung (A Man in Love)" (Remix ver.)

First video interlude

- "Bonamana" (Remix ver.)
- First MENT
- "You're My Endless Love"
- "Oops!" feat. f(x) (with Heechul's rap at VCR)
- "Wonder Boy"
- "Rokuko" – (All members)

Second video interlude (in New York City)

- "Walkin'"
- "Baby" – Henry feat. Amber of f(x)
- "Say My Name" – Eunhyuk
- "물들어" – Sungmin
- "Isn't She Lovely?" – Kyuhyun
- "Moves like Jagger" – Ryeowook
- "SHE" – Leeteuk
- "Twinkle Twinkle Little Star" (Remix ver.) – Shindong

Third video interlude

- "Good Friends"
- "Pajama Party"

Fourth video interlude (Ice Hockey)

- "Feels Good"
- "Perfection" (Korean ver.) – Super Junior-M
- "A-Cha"

Fifth video interlude

- "Mr. Simple"
- "Don't Don"
- "Because of You" – Zhou Mi
- "Kiss Me Darling" – Yesung
- "Your Grace is Enough" feat. 3rd Wave – Siwon
- "Oppa, Oppa" – Donghae & Eunhyuk

Sixth video interlude

- "Storm" – Super Junior-K.R.Y.
- "Y"
- Second MENT
- "Lovely Day" (Acapella ver.)
- "You & I"
- "Our Love"

Seventh video interlude (The Sound of Super Junior)

- "Do Re Mi- The Sound of Music"
- "White Christmas"
- "Dancing Out"
- Third MENT

Encore

- "U" (Remix)
- "Sorry, Sorry"
- "Miracle" (Remix ver.)
- Fourth MENT
- "Destiny" (Korean ver.) with Zhou Mi and Henry
Osaka, Japan

Super Junior Intro

- "Intro: Underwater"
- "Superman"
- "Opera"(Korean Ver.)
- "Twins"
- "A Man in Love" (Remix ver.)

First video interlude

- "Bonamana" (Korean Rock ver.)
- First MENT
- "You Are My Endless Love"
- "Oops!" feat. f(x) (with Heechul's rap at VCR)
- "Wonder Boy"
- "Rokuko" (Korean Ver.) – (All members)

Second video interlude (in New York City)

- "Walkin'"
- "Say My Name" – Eunhyuk
- "Ashita no Tameni" – Sungmin
- "Isn't She Lovely?" – Kyuhyun
- "SHE" – Leeteuk
- "Twinkle Twinkle Little Star" (Remix ver.) – Shindong

Third video interlude (Ice Hockey)

- "Feels Good"
- "Perfection" (Japanese ver.) – Super Junior-M
- "A-Cha"

Fourth video interlude

- "Mr. Simple" (Japanese Ver.)
- "Don't Don"
- "Your Grace is Enough" feat. 3rd Wave – Siwon

Fifth video interlude

- "Oppa, Oppa" (Korean Ver.) – Donghae & Eunhyuk
- "Storm" – Super Junior-K.R.Y.
- "Y"
- Second MENT
- "You & I"
- "Lovely Day" (Acapella ver.)
- "Our Love"
- "Do Re Mi- The Sound of Music"
- "White Christmas"
- "Dancing Out" (Remix)
- Third MENT

Encore

- "U" (Remix)
- "Sorry, Sorry" (Remix)
- "Miracle" (Remix ver.)
- Fourth MENT
- "Destiny" (Korean ver.) with Zhou Mi and Henry

== Tour dates ==
Date	City	Country	Venue	Attendance
November 19, 2011	Seoul	South Korea	Olympic Gymnastics Arena	22,000
November 20, 2011	Seoul	South Korea	Olympic Gymnastics Arena	22,000
December 10, 2011	Osaka	Japan	Kyocera Dome Osaka	90,000
December 11, 2011	Osaka	Japan	Kyocera Dome Osaka	90,000
February 2, 2012	Taipei	Taiwan	Taipei Arena	40,000
February 3, 2012	Taipei	Taiwan	Taipei Arena	40,000
February 4, 2012	Taipei	Taiwan	Taipei Arena	40,000
February 5, 2012	Taipei	Taiwan	Taipei Arena	40,000
February 18, 2012	Singapore		Singapore Indoor Stadium	16,000
February 19, 2012	Singapore		Singapore Indoor Stadium	16,000
March 9, 2012	Macau	China	Cotai Arena	—
March 10, 2012	Macau	China	Cotai Arena	—
March 16, 2012	Bangkok	Thailand	Impact Arena	40,000
March 17, 2012	Bangkok	Thailand	Impact Arena	40,000
March 18, 2012	Bangkok	Thailand	Impact Arena	40,000
April 6, 2012	Paris	France	Zénith de Paris	7,000
April 14, 2012	Shanghai	China	Mercedes-Benz Arena	10,000
April 27, 2012	Jakarta	Indonesia	Mata Elang International Stadium	25,000
April 28, 2012	Jakarta	Indonesia	Mata Elang International Stadium	25,000
April 29, 2012	Jakarta	Indonesia	Mata Elang International Stadium	25,000
May 12, 2012	Tokyo	Japan	Tokyo Dome	110,000
May 13, 2012	Tokyo	Japan	Tokyo Dome	110,000
May 26, 2012	Seoul	South Korea	Olympic Gymnastics Arena	22,000
May 27, 2012	Seoul	South Korea	Olympic Gymnastics Arena	22,000
Total				382,000

== Personnel ==
- Tour organizer: SM Entertainment
- Tour promoter: Dream Maker Entercom
- Tour guest performers : EXO-M, f(x), The Grace

== Live album ==
Super Show 4 - Super Junior World Tour Concert Album

Live album by Super Junior
- Released: June 28, 2013
- Genre: K-pop; R&B; electropop; synthpop; dance; hip hop; rock; trot
- Language: Korean, English
- Label: SM; KMP Holdings
- Producer: Lee Soo-man
- Compiler: SM

Super Junior chronology
Super Show 3 Concert Album (2011)	Super Show 4 - Super Junior World Tour Concert Album (2013)	Super Show 5 Concert Album (2015)

Super Show 4 - Super Junior World Tour Concert Album is Super Junior's fourth live recorded album, released on June 28, 2013. This album contains three CDs with 40 live recordings from the Super Show 4 concerts. It sold about 18,000 copies in South Korea.

=== Track listing ===
CD 1

1. Intro-Let Me Give You 4 (4:00)
2. Superman (Rearranged) (4:54)
3. 오페라 (Opera) (3:45)
4. Twins (Knock Out) (Rearranged) (3:27)
5. 갈증 (A Man In Love) (Rearranged) (4:10)
6. 미인아 (BONAMANA) (Rearranged) (5:28)
7. You’re My Endless Love (말하자면) (4:33)
8. Oops!! (Feat. f(x)) (4:06)
9. Wonder Boy (1:49)
10. 로꾸거!!! (Rokuko) (3:08)
11. Walkin’ (4:12)
12. Baby - Henry (4:28)
13. 자체발광 보석미남 이혁재 (Say My Name) - Eunhyuk (4:51)
14. 물들어 - Sungmin (3:10)
15. Isn’t She Lovely - Kyuhyun (4:17)

CD2

1. Moves Like Jagger - Ryeowook (3:42)
2. She - Leeteuk (3:11)
3. Twinkle, Twinkle Little Star - Shindong (3:36)
4. 어느새 우린 (Good Friends) (4:05)
5. 파자마파티 (Pajama Party) (3:44)
6. 결투 (Feels Good) (3:22)
7. 태완미 (Perfection) (Korean Ver.) - Super Junior-M (3:55)
8. A-Cha (3:20)
9. Mr. Simple (Rearranged) (5:01)
10. 돈 돈! (Don’t Don) (Rearranged) (4:09)
11. Because Of You - Zhou Mi (2:42)
12. Kiss Me - Yesung (3:36)
13. Your Grace Is Enough - Siwon (4:08)
14. 떴다 오빠 (Oppa, Oppa) - Donghae & Eunhyuk (4:05)
15. 폭풍 (Storm) (4:17)
16. Y (3:29)

CD3

1. 둘이 (You&I) (4:45)
2. Lovely Day (Rearranged) (3:14)
3. 우리들의 사랑 (Our Love) (Rearranged) (6:39)
4. Do-Re-Mi (4:11)
5. 엉뚱한 상상 (White Christmas) (3:34)
6. Dancing Out (Rearranged) (3:26)
7. U (Rearranged) (5:03)
8. Sorry, Sorry (4:13)
9. Miracle (Rearranged) (5:30)
10. 공존 (Destiny) (Korean Ver.) (4:50)
11. 미인아 (BONAMANA) (Rearranged) (Studio Version) (5:30)
12. Lovely Day (Rearranged) (Studio Version) (3:22)
13. Miracle (Rearranged) (Studio Version) (5:15)
14. 공존 (Destiny) (Korean Ver.) (Studio Version) (4:50)
