= Shine (J-Min EP) =

EP by J-Min
- Released: July 18, 2014 (Digitally); July 21, 2014 (Physically)
- Recorded: 2014 at SM Studios, Seoul, South Korea
- Genres: K-pop; Rock; Acoustic
- Length: 22:31
- Language: Korean
- Labels: S.M. Entertainment; KT Music

Singles from Shine
- 1. "Hoo" Released: June 24, 2014; 2. "Shine" Released: July 15, 2014

Shine is the debut Korean extended play by the South Korean singer-songwriter J-Min with the title track of the same name. It was released digitally on July 18, 2014 and physically on July 21, 2014 by S.M. Entertainment.

== Trivia ==
It was the debut Korean release after J-Min debuted and became active in the Japanese entertainment industry in 2007.

== Release ==
The mini-album was released digitally at major South Korean music sites such as MelOn, Genie, and Naver Music at noon on July 18, 2014. It was a preview and the entire album was then released 3 days later on July 21, 2014 physically.

The accompanying music video for Shine was then released on J-Min's official website (j-min.smtown.com) and the official YouTube channel of SMTOWN, the nickname for S.M. Entertainment's artists concurrently on July 15, 2014.

== Promotions ==
Promotions began for Hoo when J-Min started performing it at June 19's broadcast of Mnet's M! Countdown, June 20's broadcast of KBS's Music Bank, June 21's broadcast of MBC's Music Core and June 22's broadcast of SBS's Inkigayo.

Promotions began for Shine when J-Min started performing it at July 16's broadcast of MBC's Show Champion, July 17's broadcast of Mnet's M! Countdown and July 18's broadcast of KBS's Music Bank. J-Min also performed it at the SM Town Live World Tour IV in Seoul, South Korea and the Japanese version of the song in Tokyo, Japan.

== Songwriting ==
J-Min participated in the songwriting of tracks 3: If you want, 5: Finally and 6: Secret Letter respectively.

== Inspiration ==
The music video takes inspiration from the hit film Gravity.

== Concept ==
Shine is a modern rock song with an upbeat rhythm and showcases J-Min's solid vocals. It is also a refreshing hot summer song, perfect for the season.

Meanwhile, Hoo is an acoustic ballad, being re-arranged after the release of Hero, a soundtrack for the drama Miss Korea.

== Track list ==
Track in Bold is the title track of the album.

No.	Title	Lyrics	Music	Arrangement	Length
1.	"**Shine**" (Featuring Titan)	Groovie. K, Park Junha	Groovie. K, Park Junha	Groovie. K, Park Junha	3:26
2.	"Hoo" (후 (後); Hu (Hou))	Moon Sungnam	Moon Sungnam	Moon Sungnam	3:06
3.	"If you want"	J-Min	Matthew Gerrard & Bridget Benenate	Matthew Gerrard & Bridget Benenate	4:00
4.	"My Everyday" (나의 매일; Naui Maeil)	Kenzie	Kenzie	Kenzie	4:14
5.	"Finally"	J-Min	Daniel Pandher, EAR, Tommy La Verdi	Groovie. K, Park Junha	4:20
6.	"Secret Letter" (비밀편지; Bimil Pyeonji)	J-Min	Ashley Darcy, JD Relic, Keely Valentine, Scott Komer, Antwann Frost, Ryan S.Jhun	Kenzie	3:25
Total length:					22:31

== Chart performance ==
Country	Chart	Peak position
South Korea (Gaon Music Chart)	Weekly albums chart	18
South Korea (Gaon Music Chart)	Monthly albums chart	76
South Korea (Gaon Music Chart)	Yearly albums chart	—

^{1}The K-Pop Hot 100 chart was discontinued effective on May 10, 2014 and the song has not been released then.

=== Sales and certifications ===
Chart	Amount
Gaon physical sales	723+

== Release history ==
Region	Date	Format	Label
South Korea	July 18, 2014	Digital download	S.M. Entertainment; KT Music
South Korea	July 21, 2014	CD	S.M. Entertainment; KT Music
Worldwide	July 18, 2014	Digital download	S.M. Entertainment
