= 2011 SM Town Winter – The Warmest Gift =

Album by SM Town

Studio album by SM Town
- Released: December 13, 2011
- Length: 42:20
- Language: English
- Label: SM; KMP

SM Town chronology
09 Summer SM Town (2009)	2011 SM Town Winter – The Warmest Gift (2011)	SM Best Album 3 (2012)

Singles from 2011 SM Town Winter – The Warmest Gift
- 1. "Santa U Are the One" Released: December 13, 2011

2011 SM Town Winter – The Warmest Gift is the eighth winter album by SMTown, released on December 13, 2011 by SM Entertainment and distributed by KMP Holdings in South Korea. It is the first winter compilation album in four years and also their first album to have all songs sung entirely in English. This is also their only album to feature f(x) and J-Min, and is the last album to feature TRAX, The Grace's Dana and Sunday, Zhang Liyin, Girls' Generation's Jessica, SHINee's Jonghyun, and Super Junior-M's Henry.

The album's lead single is "Santa U Are the One", sung by Super Junior with Super Junior-M members Henry and Zhou Mi. The music video was released on 13 December 2011 on SMTown official YouTube Channel. It features the Super Junior members with Henry and Zhou Mi singing in the studio and behind the scenes footage of SM artists during the album's photoshoot.

== Background and release ==
On December 6, 2011, it was announced that the 2011 SM Town Winter 'The Warmest Gift' will be released on December 13 as the first SM Town winter record by SM Entertainment in four years since 2007. It was also scheduled for release in Japan on December 14. The album features 11 songs with seven new tracks and four carol remakes. In particular, all the songs in the album were recorded in English language to express gratitude to fans worldwide for sending love. All SM artists, including Kangta, BoA, TVXQ, TRAX, The Grace – Dana & Sunday, Super Junior, Girls' Generation, Shinee, f(x), Zhang Liyin, and J-Min, participated in the winter album.

== Composition ==
"Santa U Are the One", sung by Super Junior, was described as a song that gives a "bright" atmosphere with "cute" lyrics telling that "Santa is the best, bringing joy and gifts to the world" along with "cheerful" rhythms and melodies. "Sleigh Ride", sung by TVXQ, was described as a song that expresses the "cheerful" swing rhythm with the "perfect" sound that adds the grandeur of the orchestra and the "powerful" charm of the big band, expressing the cheerfulness as if riding a sled and the excitement of Christmas. "Distance", sung by BoA, was described as an R&B ballad song, with simple rhythms, dreamy piano melody, and the singer's mournful and graceful voice. "Last Christmas", sung by Shinee, was described as an electronic dance song that contains the three-dimensional charm of "dreamy and powerful" synth-pop that was remade to the group's "distinct" color. "Diamond", sung by Girls' Generation, was described as a song with a familiar yet "sophisticated" style and is a classic pop song that expresses the warm and happy feeling of winter with the group's "unique" charm. "For The First Time", sung by Kangta, was described as an acoustic ballad song that recalls the days spent with the woman he loves and the emotion of love he received from her. "Like A Dream", sung by TRAX, is a newly recorded English version of the song from the group's third extended play (EP), Blind, to match the winter mood. "The First Noel", sung by Zhang Liyin, was a remake of the famous song loved worldwide. "1,2,3", sung by f(x), was described as a "cute and lovely" song suitable for a winter track with Peppertones-produced "unique, bright, and healthy" music color. "Amazing", sung by The Grace – Dana & Sunday, was described as a pop ballad song containing everyday life's preciousness. "Happy Xmas (War Is Over)", sung J-Min, was a remake from the original track of John Lennon and Yoko Ono with the singer's "refreshing and appealing" vocals.

== Promotion and reception ==
A music video for SM Town's winter album 2011 SM Town Winter 'The Warmest Gift' single, "Santa U Are The One", was released on December 13, 2011. The video was posted on SM Town's official YouTube channel and featured a variety of SM Entertainment artists on the cover of the studio album. Super Junior members were seen in behind-the-scenes and sketches of the recording studio landscape in the visual for the single. The album debuted and peaked atop South Korea's Gaon Album Chart in the chart issue dated December 11–17, 2011. In Japan, it debuted and peaked at position 36 on Oricon Albums Chart in the chart issue dated December 12–18, 2011. It appeared at position 32 on 2011's Gaon Year-End Album Chart, with 44,467 albums sold and 1,114 in January 2012.

== Track listing ==
2011 Winter SM Town – The Warmest Gift track listing
No.	Title	Lyrics	Music	Arrangement	Length
1.	"Santa U Are the One" (sung by Super Junior with Henry and Zhou Mi)	Ove Andre Brenna	Brenna	BJJ Music	3:34
2.	"Sleigh Ride" (sung by TVXQ)	Leroy Anderson; Mitchell Parish	Anderson; Parish	Nile Lee	2:54
3.	"Distance" (sung by BoA)	Andrew Choi; Alex Wright	Kim Tae-sung	Kim T.	3:29
4.	"Last Christmas" (sung by Shinee)	George Michael	Michael	Kenzie	4:37
5.	"Diamond" (sung by Girls' Generation)	Kim Jung-bae	Kenzie	Kenzie	3:16
6.	"For the First Time" (sung by Kangta)	Yu Seong-min	Anne Judith Wik	Yu	4:39
7.	"Like a Dream" (sung by TRAX)	Jay Hong	Jungmo	Hitchhiker	3:41
8.	"The First Noel" (sung by Zhang Liyin)			Lee Yoon-jae; Jung Ma-tae	3:18
9.	"1,2,3" (sung by f(x))	Anne Judith Wik	Peppertones	Peppertones	4:20
10.	"Amazing" (sung by The Grace – Dana & Sunday)	Jens Oettrich; Linda Andrews; Jesper Tønnow Rasmussen	Oettrich; Andrews; Rasmussen	Kei Lim; Kim Yoo-min	4:55
11.	"Happy Xmas (War Is Over)" (sung by J-Min)	John Lennon; Yoko Ono	Lennon; Ono	Hwang Hyun	3:37
Total length:					42:20

== Charts ==
=== Weekly charts ===
Weekly charts for 2011 Winter SM Town – The Warmest Gift
Chart (2011)	Peak position
Japanese Albums (Oricon)	36
South Korean Albums (Gaon)	1

=== Monthly charts ===
Monthly chart performance for 2011 Winter SM Town – The Warmest Gift
Chart (January 2012)	Position
South Korean Albums (Gaon)	2

=== Yearly charts ===
Year-end chart performance for 2011 Winter SM Town – The Warmest Gift
Chart (2011)	Position
South Korean Albums (Gaon)	32

=== Singles charts ===
Weekly chart performance of singles in Gaon Digital Chart
Song	Peak position
"Santa U Are the One"	64
"Diamond"	52

== Release history ==
Release history for 2011 Winter SM Town – The Warmest Gift
Region	Date	Format(s)	Label(s)	Ref.
Various	December 13, 2011	CD; digital download; streaming	SM; KMP	
Japan	December 14, 2011	CD	SM; Avex	
