= Opera (Super Junior song) =

- CD+DVD cover

Single by Super Junior
- Language: Korean; Japanese
- B-side: "Way"
- Released: 9 May 2012
- Recorded: 2011
- Studio: Hub (Seoul); SM Yellow Tail (Seoul)
- Genre: Dance-pop
- Length: 3:01
- Label: Avex Trax
- Composers: Thomas Troelsen; Engelina Larsen
- Lyricists: Kenzie; Masanori Nagaoka
- Producer: Kenzie

Super Junior singles chronology
"Santa U Are the One" (2011)	"Opera" (2012)	"Sexy, Free & Single" (2012)

Music video
- "Opera" on YouTube

"Opera" is the third official Japanese single of South Korean boy band Super Junior, released on 9 May 2012 by Avex Trax. It was originally released in Korean as part of their fifth Korean studio album, Mr. Simple on 3 August 2011. This single set a new record as the most singles sold by a Korean artist in a week.

== Background ==
The song was originally written in English as "N.A.U.G.H.T.Y", by both Thomas Troelsen and Engelina Larsen. It was never released and re-written in Korean by Kenzie and became a part of the group's fifth studio album, Mr. Simple as the second track off its initial release.

== Reception ==
On the day of released the single debut at number 3 on Oricon Daily Chart and sold 54,331 copies. The following day it sold an additional 15,608 copies. The single debuted at #3 on Oricon Weekly Chart, selling 159,789 copies on its first week of release, outselling their previous Japanese single Mr. Simple which sold 88,873 on its first week, making it Super Junior's highest-selling Japanese release and as the 2012 top selling Korean artist in Japan.

== Track listing ==
=== CD ===
1. "Opera"
2. "Way"
3. "Opera" - Korean ver. (Limited edition CD Only)

=== "CD+DVD" DVD track list ===
1. "Opera"
2. "Opera" - Dance ver.
3. Off Shot Clip

== Credits and personnel ==
Credits adapted from album's liner notes.

Studio

- SM Yellow Tail Studio – recording, mixing
- Hub Studio – recording
- Sonic Korea – mastering

Personnel

- SM Entertainment – executive producer
- Lee Soo-man – producer
- Super Junior – vocals
  - Yesung – background vocals
  - Ryeowook – background vocals
  - Kyuhyun – background vocals
- Thomas Troelsen – composition
- Engelina Larsen – composition
- Kenzie – producer, Korean lyrics, arrangement, vocal directing, recording
- Masanori Nagaoka – Japanese lyrics
- Koo Jong-pil – recording, mixing
- Jeong Eun-kyung – recording
- Jeon Hoon – mastering

== Charts and sales ==
Oricon Chart	Peak	Debut Sales	Sales Total
Daily Singles Chart	1	54,331	184,469+
Weekly Singles Chart	3	159,789	184,469+
Monthly Singles Chart	5	177,448	184,469+
Yearly Singles Chart	35	184,469	184,469+

=== Sales and certifications ===
Chart	Amount
Oricon physical sales	184,469+
RIAJ physical shipping certification	Gold

== Release history ==
Release history for "Opera"
Region	Date	Version	Format	Label	Ref
Various	August 3, 2011	Korean	Digital download; streaming	SM; KMP	
Japan	May 9, 2012	Japanese	CD; DVD	Avex Trax	
Various	May 9, 2012	Japanese	Digital download; streaming	Avex Trax	
