= Oops! (Super Junior song) =

Song by Super Junior and f(x)

from the album A-Cha
- Released: September 19, 2011
- Recorded: 2011
- Studio: Hub
- Genre: Electronic; Hip hop
- Length: 3:44
- Label: SM; KMP
- Composers: Kalle Engstrom; William J. Fuller
- Lyricists: Leeteuk; Heechul; Shindong; Eunhyuk; Donghae, Misfit
- Producers: Hitchhiker, Lee Soo-man

"Oops!" is a song by South Korean boy band Super Junior featuring their labelmate girl group f(x). The track is released as part of Super Junior's repackaged version of their fifth studio album, Mr. Simple (as "A-Cha") on September 19, 2011.

== Background ==
The lyrics of the song are written by Misfit and Super Junior members Eunhyuk, Donghae, Shindong, Leeteuk and Heechul, which are also the ones who wrote the rap verses. SM describes the song as "a unique rap song which shows Super Junior’s own distinctive charms and the featured artist f(x)’s refreshing voice and sound effects double the fun of the song." The song also features the use of guitar and an acid-sounding synthesizer background performed by Hitchhiker, the producer and director of the song.

== Performances ==
The song was first performed in the KBS music program You Hee-yeol's Sketchbook on September 30, 2011 together with Girls' Generation member Tiffany. The song was also performed during the Super Show 4 Tour on November 19 and 20 with f(x) members Amber, Victoria and Sulli.

== Charts ==
Chart performance for "Oops!"
Chart (2021)	Peak position
South Korea (Gaon Digital Chart)	88
South Korea (Gaon Download Chart)	100
US World Digital Song Sales (Billboard)	10
