= SM Town Live World Tour IV =

2014–15 concert tour by SM Town

- World tour by SM Town
- Poster for the Seoul show
- Location: East Asia
- Start date: 15 August 2014
- End date: 26 July 2015

SM Town concert chronology
- SM Town Week (2013); SM Town Live World Tour IV (2014–2015); SM Town Live Tour V in Japan (2016)

SM Town Live World Tour IV was the 2014–15 worldwide live concert tour by SM Town. The tour commenced with one show in Seoul and then continued in Tokyo, Shanghai, Hsinchu.

== Background ==
SM Town is the name for the artists under Korean record label SM Entertainment. Each year the company organizes their artists to come together and perform on a four to six hours long concert that tours around the Asian continent.

== Concerts ==
The concert in Seoul was attended by at least 35,000 audiences, and the concert featured performances from artists like BoA, Kangta, TVXQ, Super Junior, Girls' Generation, Shinee, f(x), Red Velvet, EXO, TRAX, Zhang Li Yin, as well as 18 trainees from the company's trainee project team SM Rookies.

The concert at the Ajinomoto Stadium in Tokyo, Japan attracted over 120,000 people in 2 days.

The concert in Taiwan took place at the Hsinchu County Stadium in Zhubei City.

== Performers ==
Seoul, South Korea (August 15, 2014)

Performers

- Kangta
- BoA
- TVXQ
- Super Junior ^{[A]}
  - Super Junior-M
- Girls' Generation
- SHINee ^{[B]}
- f(x) ^{[C]}
- EXO ^{[D]}
- Zhang Liyin
- J-Min
- Red Velvet
- Fly to the Sky ^{[E]}
- SM Rookies^{[F]}

^{A} Yesung was absent due to his active military service.
^{B} Onew was absent due to health condition.
^{C} Sulli was absent due to her hiatus.
^{D} Kris was absent due to lawsuit.
^{E} Fly to the Sky is the former male group from S.M Entertainment. They acted as special guest in the concert due to Lee Soo Man's invititation.
^{F} Members who participated on this leg were Hansol, Johnny, Taeyong, Yuta, Ten, Jaehyun, Yeri, Koeun, Mark, Jeno, Haechan, Hina, Jaemin, Jisung, Herin, Jeesu, and Winny.

Tokyo, Japan (October 4/5, 2014)

Performers

- BoA
- TVXQ
- Super Junior ^{[A]}
  - Super Junior-M
- Girls' Generation ^{[B]}
- SHINee
- f(x) ^{[C]}
- EXO ^{[D]}
- J-Min
- Red Velvet
- SM Rookies^{[E]}

^{A} Yesung was absent due to his active military service.
^{B} Jessica was absent due to her recent departure from Girls' Generation. Sooyoung was absent due to the filming schedule of the drama My Spring Days.
^{C} Sulli was absent due to her hiatus.
^{D} Kris was absent due to lawsuit. Lu Han was absent due to health condition.
^{F} Members who participated on this leg were Hansol, Johnny, Taeyong, Yuta, Ten, Jaehyun, Yeri, Koeun, Mark, Jeno, Haechan, Hina, Jaemin, Jisung, Herin, Jeesu, and Winny.

Shanghai, China (October 18, 2014)

Performers

- Kangta
- BoA
- TVXQ
- Super Junior ^{[A]}
  - Super Junior-M
- Girls' Generation ^{[B]}
- SHINee
- f(x) ^{[C]}
- EXO ^{[D]}
- Zhang Liyin
- Red Velvet
- S ^{[E]}
- Tasty ^{[F]}
- SM Rookies^{[G]}

^{A} Yesung was absent due to his active military service.
^{B} Jessica was absent due to her recent departure from Girls' Generation. Sooyoung was absent due to the filming schedule of the drama My Spring Days.；
^{C} Sulli was absent due to her hiatus. Krystal felt sick after performing Red Light so she did not take part in Hope, the ending song of SM Town Live World Tour IV.
^{D} Kris and Lu Han were absent due to lawsuit.
^{E} S is a project group of S.M Entertainment. It was debuted in 2003. This regarded as their first live performance in their Korean comeback.
^{F} Tasty is a Chinese K-pop duo signed to Woollim Entertainment, and their participation was to mark their agency's integration to SM Entertainment's subsidiary, SM Culture and Contents.
^{G} Members who participated on this leg were Hansol, Johnny, Taeyong, Yuta, Ten, Jaehyun, Yeri, Koeun, Mark, Jeno, Haechan, Hina, Jaemin, Jisung, Herin, Jeesu, and Winny.

Hsinchu, Taiwan (March 21, 2015)

Performers

- Kangta
- BoA
- TVXQ
- Super Junior ^{[A]}
  - Super Junior-M
- Girls' Generation ^{[B]}
- SHINee
- f(x) ^{[C]}
- EXO ^{[D]}
- Zhang Liyin
- Red Velvet^{[E]}
- Tasty ^{[F]}
- SM Rookies^{[G]}

^{A} Yesung was absent due to his active military service. Shindong and Sungmin were absent due to their preparations for military service.
^{B} Jessica was absent due to her departure from Girls' Generation in last year. Yoona was absent due to the filming schedule of Chinese drama《Chinese Hero Zhao Zi Long》.
^{C} Sulli was absent due to her hiatus.
^{D} Kris and Lu Han were absent due to lawsuit. Lay was absent due to the filming schedule of Chinese movie《從天而降》.
^{E} Red Velvet consisted of five members since Yeri was added to the group. Yeri previously performed with the female SM Rookie members in 2014.
^{F} Tasty is a Chinese K-pop duo signed to Woollim Entertainment, and their participation was to mark their agency's integration to SM Entertainment's subsidiary, SM Culture and Contents.
^{G} Members who participated on this leg were Hansol, Johnny, Taeyong, Yuta, Doyoung, Ten, Jaehyun, Koeun, Mark, Jeno, Haechan, Hina, Jaemin, Jisung, Herin, Jeesu, and Winny.

Tokyo, Japan (Special Edition) (July 5/6, 2015)

Performers

- Kangta
- BoA
- Shim Changmin^{[A]}
- TRAX
- Super Junior ^{[B]}
  - Super Junior-M
- Girls' Generation^{[C]}
- SHINee
- f(x)^{[D]}
- EXO^{[E]}
- Red Velvet ^{[F]}
- J-Min
- SM Rookies ^{G}

^{A} Yunho was absent due to his preparations for military service so Changmin represented TVXQ to participate the concert.
^{B} Shindong and Sungmin were absent due to their active military service.
^{C} Jessica was absent due to her departure from Girls' Generation in last year.
^{D} Victoria was absent due to health condition. Sulli was absent due to her hiatus.
^{E} Kris and Lu Han were absent due to lawsuit. Tao was absent due to his hiatus.
^{F} Red Velvet consisted of five members since Yeri was added to the group. Yeri previously performed with the female SM Rookie members in 2014.
^{G} Members who participated on this leg were Hansol, Johnny, Taeyong, Yuta, Doyoung, Ten, Jaehyun, Koeun, Mark, Jeno, Haechan, Hina, Jaemin, Jisung, Herin, Jeesu, and Winny.

Osaka, Japan (July 25/26, 2015)

Performers

- Kangta
- BoA
- Shim Changmin^{[A]}
- TRAX
- Super Junior ^{[B]}
  - Super Junior-M
- Girls' Generation^{[C]}
- SHINee^{[D]}
- f(x)^{[E]}
- EXO^{[F]}
- Red Velvet ^{[G]}
- J-Min
- SM Rookies ^{[G]}

^{A} Yunho was absent due to his active military service so Changmin represented TVXQ to participate the concert.
^{B} Shindong and Sungmin were absent due to their active military service.
^{C} Jessica was absent due to her departure from Girls' Generation in last year.
^{D} Minho was absent due to health condition.
^{E} Victoria was absent due to health condition. Sulli was absent due to her hiatus.
^{F} Kris and Lu Han were absent due to lawsuit. Tao was absent due to his hiatus.
^{G} Red Velvet consisted of five members since Yeri was added to the group. Yeri previously performed with the female SM Rookie members in 2014.
^{G} Members who participated on this leg were Hansol, Johnny, Taeyong, Yuta, Doyoung, Ten, Jaehyun, Koeun, Mark, Jeno, Haechan, Hina, Jaemin, Jisung, Herin, Jeesu, and Winny.

== Set list ==
Seoul, South Korea (August 15, 2014)
1. Shine (J-Min)
2. My Endless Love (J-Min ＆ Kangta)
3. Fly With Me (Lee Dong Woo)
4. Fly Me To The Moon (Lee Dong Woo & Girls' Generation Sunny)
5. Loving You (Zhou Mi ＆ Victoria Song with EXO Xiumin，Tao，Sehun as special appearance )
6. Agape (Zhang Liyin)
7. Bad Girl (Henry Lau feat. Park Chanyeol)
8. Rum Pum Pum Pum (f(x))
9. Goodbye Summer (f(x))- Amber，Luna ＆ Krystal feat. EXO D.O)
10. Bang Bang (SHINee Key ＆ Girls' Generation Tiffany)
11. Motorcycle (Super Junior Eunhyuk & Donghae)
12. Problem (Girls' Generation Seohyun feat. Amber Liu)
13. Something- Girls Day Cover (Cho Kyuhyun，Shim Changmin，Choi Minho，EXO Suho)
14. SMRookies
15. SMRookies
16. SMRookies
17. Fantastic (Henry Lau)
18. Swing(Korean Version)(Super Junior-M)
19. Into The New World (Girls' Generation)
20. Hoot (Girls' Generation)
21. Kissing You (Girls' Generation)
22. SMRookies
23. Happiness (Red Velvet)
24. Say Something (Kangta feat.Girls' Generation Tiffany)
25. Let Out The Beast (EXO)
26. Jet (f(x))
27. Green Rain (SHINee)
28. Lucky (EXO)
29. Gee & Can't Take My Eyes Off Of You (Girls' Generation)
30. Always With You (TVXQ)
31. Hug (TVXQ)
32. Dream (TVXQ)
33. That's What Friends Are For (Henry Lau，(f(x)) Luna，Red Velvet Wendy＆ EXO Chen)
34. Why So Serious? (SHINee)
35. Vacation (f(x))
36. Hot Summer (f(x))
37. I Got A Boy (Girls' Generation)
38. Machine (EXO)
39. SMRookies
40. MAMA (EXO)
41. SMRookies
42. Lucifer (SHINee)
43. Rising Sun (TVXQ)
44. Girls On Top (BoA)
45. No.1 (BoA)
46. My Name (BoA)
47. Ace (Lee Taemin)
48. Danger (Lee Taemin)
49. Pretty Boy (Lee Taemin feat. EXO Kai)
50. Missing You (Kim Ryeowook，EXO D.O，Fly To The Sky)
51. You, You, You (Fly To The Sky)
52. Wolf (EXO)
53. Dream Girl (SHINee)
54. Sherlock (SHINee)
55. Sorry Sorry (Super Junior)
56. Mr Simple (Super Junior)
57. Shining Star (Super Junior)
58. Shake It Up & Oppa Oppa & Rockstar (Super Junior)
59. You Need Me (Shim Changmin，EXO D.O，Lee Taemin ＆SMRookie Jaehyun)
60. Dance Performance (Super Junior Eunhyuk，(f(x)) Luna，Kim Hyoyeon，EXO Lay，Sehun，Kai)
61. I Believe (Super Junior)
62. Keep Your Head Down (TVXQ)
63. Spellbound (TVXQ)
64. Something (TVXQ)
65. Overdose (EXO)
66. Red Light (f(x))
67. Only One (BoA feat.Super Junior Eunhyuk)
68. Everybody (SHINee)
69. Mr Mr (Girls' Generation)
70. Catch Me (TVXQ)
71. Hope (All Artists)
Tokyo, Japan (October 4/5, 2014)
1. Shine (Japanese Version) (J-Min)
2. Endless Love (J-Min ＆ Kangta)
3. Warrior's Descendant /We Are The Future /My Life/ Breaka Shaka (Kangta)
4. Bang Bang (SHINee Key ＆ Girls' Generation Tiffany)
5. Motorcycle (Super Junior Donghae & Eunhyuk)
6. Problem (Girls' Generation Seohyun feat. Amber Liu)
7. Ichigo (Shim Changmin，Cho Kyuhyun ＆ Choi Minho)
8. Fantastic (Japanese Version) (Henry Lau)
9. Swing (Korean Version) (Super Junior-M)
10. Paparazzi (Girls' Generation)
11. Kissing You (Girls' Generation)
12. Happiness (Red Velvet)
13. Say Something (Kangta feat.Girls' Generation Tiffany)
14. Rum Pum Pum Pum (f(x))
15. Jet (f(x))
16. 3 2 1 (SHINee)
17. Gee (Japanese Version) & Can't Take My Eyes Off You (Girls' Generation)
18. We Are / Somebody To Love (TVXQ)
19. That's What Friends Are For (Henry Lau，(f(x)) Luna，Red Velvet Wendy ＆ EXO Chen)
20. Why So Serious? (SHINee)
21. Vacation / Hot Summer (Japanese Version) (f(x))
22. Machine / T.O.P (EXO)
23. Rising Sun (Japanese Version)(TVXQ)
24. Danger (Lee Taemin)
25. Pretty Boy (Lee Taemin ＆ EXO Kai)
26. Shout It Out (BoA)
27. First Time (BoA)
28. Masayume Chasing (BoA)
29. Holler (Girls' Generation-TTS)
30. Growl (EXO)
31. Wolf (EXO)
32. Lucifer (Japanese Version) (SHINee)
33. Downtown Baby (SHINee)
34. Sorry Sorry (Super Junior)
35. Mr Simple (Japanese Version) (Super Junior)
36. Shake It Up / Oppa Oppa / Rockstar (Super Junior)
37. You Needed Me (Lee Changmin，EXO D.O，Lee Taemin ＆SMRookie Jaehyun)
38. Dance Performance (Super Junior Eunhyuk，(f(x)) Luna，Kim Hyoyeon，Exo Kai，Sehun ＆ Lay)
39. Keep Your Head Down (Japanese Version) (TVXQ)
40. Something (Japanese Version) (TVXQ)
41. Overdose (EXO)
42. Red Light (f(x))
43. Only One (Japanese Version) (BoA feat. EXO Lay)
44. Everybody (Japanese Version)(SHINee)
45. Mr Mr (Japanese Version)(Girls' Generation)
46. Mamacita (Super Junior)
47. Catch Me (Japanese Version)(TVXQ)
48. Hope (All Artists)
Shanghai, China (October 18, 2014)
1. You Know Me (Tasty)
2. Warrior's Descendant / We Are The Future / My Life / Breaka Shaka(Kangta)
3. Loving You (Zhou Mi ＆ Victoria Song with EXO Xiumin，Tao，Sehun as special appearance)
4. Agape (Zhang Liyin)
5. Not Alone (Zhang Liyin)
6. Bad Girl (Henry Lau feat. Park Chanyeol)
7. Bang Bang (SHINee Key ＆ Girls' GenerationTiffany)
8. Motorcycle (Super Junior Donghae & Eunhyuk)
9. Problem (Girls' Generation Seohyun feat. Amber Liu)
10. Listen To The Sea (Shim Changmin ＆ Cho Kyuhyun)
11. SMRookies
12. SMRookies
13. SMRookies
14. Rum Pum Pum Pum (f(x))
15. SMRookies
16. SMRookies
17. SMRookies
18. Fantastic (Henry Lau)
19. Swing(Super Junior-M)
20. Hoot (Girls' Generation)
21. Kissing You (Girls' Generation)
22. Blind (Zhou Mi)
23. Happiness (Red Velvet)
24. Say Something (Kangta feat.Girls' Generation Tiffany)
25. Rum Pum Pum Pum (f(x))
26. Jet (f(x))
27. Green Rain (SHINee)
28. Lucky (Chinese Version) (EXO)
29. Gee & Can't Take My Eyes Off Of You (Girls' Generation)
30. Always With You (TVXQ)
31. Dream (TVXQ)
32. That's What Friends Are For (Henry Lau，(f(x)) Luna，Red Velvet Wendy ＆ EXO Chen)
33. Why So Serious? (SHINee)
34. Vacation (f(x))
35. Hot Summer (f(x))
36. Machine (EXO)
37. SMRookies
38. MAMA (EXO)
39. SMRookies
40. Lucifer (SHINee)
41. Rising Sun (TVXQ)
42. Ace (Lee Taemin)
43. Danger (Lee Taemin)
44. Pretty Boy (Lee Taemin feat. EXO Kai)
45. Girls On Top (BoA)
46. No.1 (BoA)
47. My Name (BoA)
48. Dream Girl (SHINee)
49. Sherlock (SHINee)
50. Holler (Girls' Generation-TTS)
51. Dolls (S feat.Cho Kyuhyun)
52. Without You (S)
53. Growl (Chinese Version) (EXO)
54. Wolf (Chinese Version) (EXO)
55. Sorry Sorry (Super Junior)
56. Mr Simple (Super Junior)
57. Shining Star (Super Junior)
58. Shake It Up / Oppa Oppa / Rockstar (Super Junior)
59. You Need Me (Shim Changmin，EXO D.O，Lee Taemin ＆SMRookie Jaehyun)
60. Dance Performance (Super Junior Eunhyuk，(f(x)) Luna，Kim Hyoyeon，EXO Lay，Sehun，Kai)
61. Keep Your Head Down (TVXQ)
62. Something (TVXQ)
63. Overdose (Chinese Version) (EXO)
64. Red Light (f(x))
65. Only One (BoA feat.Sehun)
66. Everybody (SHINee)
67. Mr Mr (Girls' Generation)
68. Catch Me (TVXQ)
69. Hope (All Artists)
Hsinchu, Taiwan (March 21, 2015)
1. You Know Me (Tasty)
2. Warrior's Descendant / We Are The Future / My Life / Breaka Shaka(Kangta)
3. Loving You (Zhou Mi ＆ Victoria Song)
4. Agape (Zhang Liyin)
5. Not Alone (Zhang Liyin)
6. Bad Girl (Henry Lau feat. Park Chanyeol)
7. Bang Bang (SHINee Key ＆ Girls' Generation Tiffany)
8. Motorcycle (Super Junior Donghae & Eunhyuk)
9. Growing Pains (Super Junior Donghae & Eunhyuk)
10. Shake That Brass (Amber Liu)
11. Problem (Girls' Generation Seohyun feat. Amber Liu)
12. At Gwanghwamun (Chinese Version) (Cho Kyuhyun)
13. Listen To The Sea (Shim Changmin ＆ Cho Kyuhyun)
14. Fantastic (Henry Lau)
15. Swing(Super Junior-M)
16. SMRookies
17. SMRookies
18. SMRookies
19. SMRookies
20. Hoot (Girls' Generation)
21. Kissing You (Girls' Generation)
22. Rewind (Zhou Mi feat. EXO Tao)
23. Happiness (Red Velvet)
24. Ice Cream Cake (Red Velvet)
25. Say Something (Kangta feat.Girls' Generation Tiffany)
26. Rum Pum Pum Pum (f(x))
27. Jet (f(x))
28. Green Rain (SHINee)
29. Lucky (EXO)
30. Gee & Can't Take My Eyes Off Of You (Girls' Generation)
31. Always With You (TVXQ)
32. Dream (TVXQ)
33. That's What Friends Are For (Henry Lau，(f(x)) Luna，Red Velvet Wendy ＆ EXO Chen)
34. Why So Serious? (SHINee)
35. Vacation (f(x) (group)f(x)]])
36. Hot Summer (f(x))
37. Machine (EXO)
38. SMRookies
39. MAMA (EXO)
40. SMRookies
41. Lucifer (SHINee)
42. Rising Sun (TVXQ)
43. Ace (Lee Taemin)
44. Danger (Lee Taemin)
45. Pretty Boy (Lee Taemin feat. EXO Kai)
46. Girls On Top (BoA)
47. No.1 (BoA)
48. My Name (BoA)
49. Dream Girl (SHINee)
50. Sherlock (SHINee)
51. Holler (Girls' Generation-TTS)
52. Deja-Boo (Kim Jonghyun)
53. Growl (EXO)
54. Wolf (EXO)
55. Sorry Sorry (Super Junior)
56. Mr Simple (Super Junior)
57. Shining Star (Super Junior)
58. Shake It Up / Oppa Oppa / Rockstar (Super Junior)
59. You Need Me (Shim Changmin，EXO D.O，Lee Taemin ＆SMRookie Jaehyun)
60. Dance Performance (Super Junior Eunhyuk，(f(x)) Luna，Kim Hyoyeon，EXO Lay，Sehun，Kai)
61. Keep Your Head Down (TVXQ)
62. Something (TVXQ)
63. Overdose (EXO)
64. Red Light (f(x))
65. Only One (BoA feat.Sehun)
66. Everybody (SHINee)
67. Mr Mr (Girls' Generation)
68. MAMACITA (Super Junior)
69. Catch Me (TVXQ)
70. Hope (All Artists)
Tokyo, Japan (Special Edition) (July 5/6, 2015)
1. Shine (J-Min) (JP)
2. Endless Love (Kangta, J-Min)
3. Medley (Kangta)
4. Descendants of Soldiers (Kangta)
5. We Are The Future (Kangta)
6. Twenty Whree (Kangta)
7. Love Frequency (Kangta)
8. At Gwanghwamun (Kyuhyun)
9. Saturday Night (Super Junior Donghae & Eunhyuk) (JP)
10. Shake That Brass (Amber feat. Tae Yeon)
11. Strawberry (Chen, Kyuhyun, Min-ho) (JP)
12. Rap + Dance Performance (SM ROOKIES Men - Litai Yong, Zheng Yin, Xu Yinghao (Johnny))
13. Violet aroma (SM ROOKIES woman younger group)
14. No No No No No (SM ROOKIES Women younger group)
15. Fantastic (Henry) (JP)
16. Swing (Super Junior-M)
17. Paparazzi (SNSD) (JP)
18. Kissing You (SNSD)
19. Rewind ( Zhou Mi feat. Pu Canlie )
20. Growl (SM ROOKIES men younger group)
21. Happiness (Red Velvet)
22. Ice Cream Cake (Red Velvet)
23. Rum Pum Pum Pum (f(x))
24. All Night (f(x))
25. 3, 2, 1 (SHINee) (JP)
26. Gee (SNSD) (JP)
27. Can Not Take My Eyes Off You (EN)
28. That's What Friends Are For (Henry, Luna, Chen, Wendy) (EN)
29. Harmony In The End Of Summer (BoA) (JP)
30. Why So Serious? (SHINee)
31. Hot Summer (f(x)) (JP)
32. Warrior Descendants (SM ROOKIES Men Global Group)
33. Machine (EXO)
34. Mirotic (Shen Chang-Min, Choi Min-ho, Lee Taemin) (JP)
35. Wolf (EXO)
36. Ace (Taemin)
37. Danger (Taemin)
38. Pretty Boy (Taemin feat. Kai)
39. Shout It Out (BoA) (JP)
40. First Time (BoA) (JP)
41. Masayume Chasing (BoA) (JP)
42. Holler (Girls' Generation-TTS)
43. Love Me Right (EXO)
44. Growl (EXO)
45. We Are (Shen Chang-Min, Key, Xiumin, Suho, Bo Yin side, Chen) (JP)
46. Somebody To Love (Shen Chang-Min, Key, Xiumin, Suho, Bo Yin side, Chen) (JP)
47. Downtown Baby (SHINee) (JP)
48. Your Number (SHINee) (JP)
49. Sorry Sorry (Super Junior)
50. Mr. Simple (Super Junior) (JP)
51. Team One Sound (Club Remix) (Super Junior)
52. Shake It Up (Super Junior)
53. Oppa, Oppa (Super Junior) (JP)
54. Rockstar (Super Junior)
55. You Needed Me (Shen Chang-Min, Taemin, DO, Cheng Yin) (EN)
56. Dance Performance (Eunhyuk, Lay, Luna, Oh Se-hoon, Kim Hyo-yeon, Kai)
57. Rusty (Shen Chang-Min) (JP)
58. Nail (Shen Chang-Min) (JP)
59. Bolero (Chang-Min Shen, Kyuhyun, Chen) (JP)
60. Call Me Baby (EXO)
61. Red Light (f(x))
62. Kiss My Lips (BoA)
63. View (SHINee)
64. Catch Me If You Can (SNSD) (JP)
65. Mamacita (Super Junior) (JP)
66. Can You Feel It (Super Junior Donghae & Eunhyuk feat. Shen Chang-Min)
67. Light (Hope) (SMTOWN all)

== Tour dates ==
Date	City	Country	Venue	Attendance
August 15, 2014	Seoul	South Korea	Seoul World Cup Stadium	35,000
October 4, 2014	Tokyo	Japan	Ajinomoto Stadium	120,000
October 5, 2014	Tokyo	Japan	Ajinomoto Stadium	120,000
October 18, 2014	Shanghai	China	Shanghai Stadium	30,000
March 21, 2015	Hsinchu	Taiwan	Hsinchu County Stadium	25,000
July 5, 2015	Tokyo	Japan	Tokyo Dome	100,000
July 6, 2015	Tokyo	Japan	Tokyo Dome	100,000
July 25, 2015	Osaka	Japan	Kyocera Dome	90,000
July 26, 2015	Osaka	Japan	Kyocera Dome	90,000
TOTAL				400,000
