= Super Junior-L.S.S. =

Subgroup of the South Korean boy band Super Junior

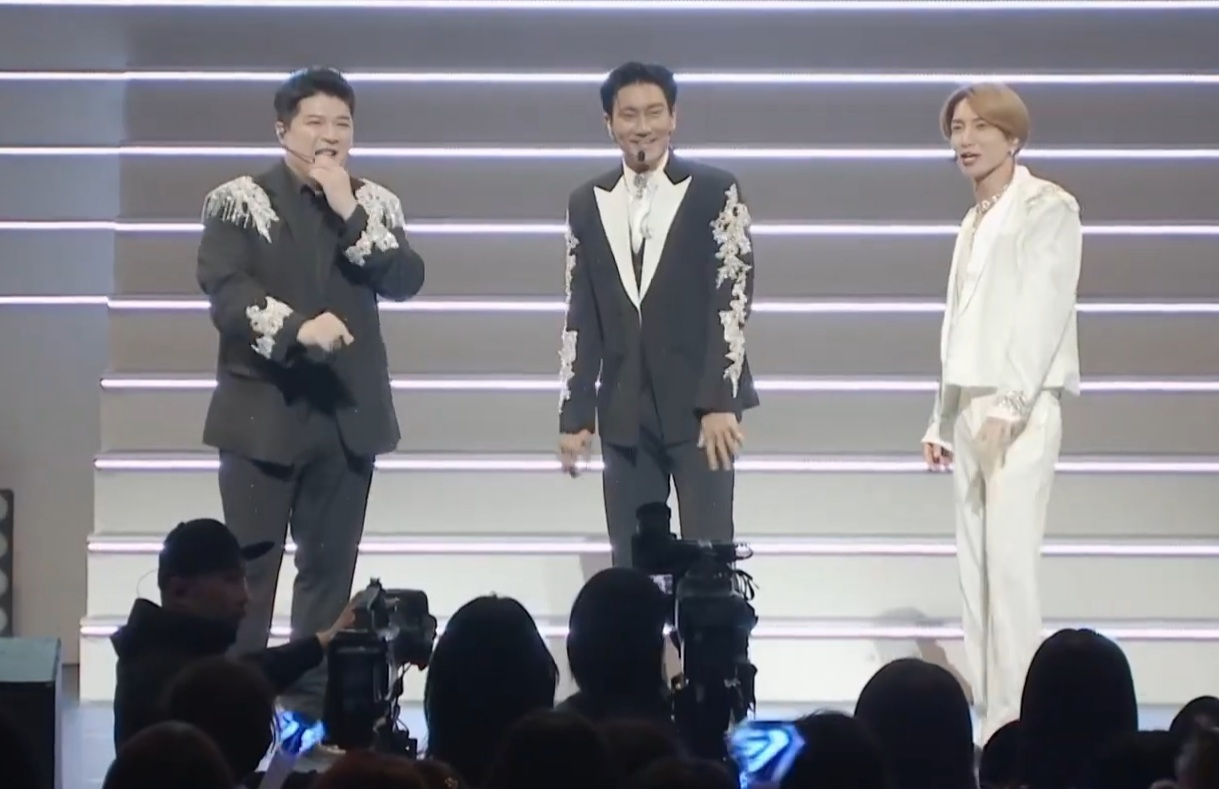
- The boy band in 2023. From left to right: Shindong, Siwon, Leeteuk

Background information
- Origin: Seoul, South Korea
- Genres: Dance-pop; funk
- Years active: 2022–present
- Labels: SM; Avex Trax
- Spinoff of: Super Junior
- Members: Leeteuk; Shindong; Siwon

Super Junior-L.S.S. is the sixth sub-unit of South Korean boy band Super Junior, consists of three members: Leeteuk, Shindong and Siwon. They debuted on July 5, 2023, with the single "Shattā Shimero".

== History ==
=== 2022–present: Formation and debut ===
On November 30 and December 1, 2022, Super Junior-L.S.S. held their first fan-meeting, "Super Junior-L.S.S. Japan FanMeeting".

On July 5, 2023, Super Junior-L.S.S. released their debut single "Shattā Shimero". On July 7 and 8, Super Junior-L.S.S. held their fan-meeting, "Super Junior-L.S.S. Let's Standing Show" at the Tokyo International Forum Hall. They performed unreleased Japanese songs including "New Road", "Ceremony" and "Old Skool" during the fan-meeting. On September 13, Super Junior-L.S.S. released their second single "Ceremony". On November 28, Super Junior-L.S.S. announced that they will release their first extended play Let's Standing Show on January 17, 2024. On December 22, The trio announced would held a solo concert "THE SHOW: Th3ee Guys" on February 3 to 4, 2024 at the Grand Theater of the Donghae Culture and Arts Center at Kwangwoon University in Seoul and would continue their Asia tour in several cities. The group will also release their first Korean single.

On January 17, 2024, their first Japanese EP Let's Standing Show was released. The EP contains their previous single "シャッター閉めろ / Shattā Shimero" and "Ceremony" alongside two new tracks, including the title track "Old School". On January 22, the trio released the first Korean single "Suit Up" was described as dance-pop funky song. The trio made their first broadcasting debut stage on January 25 at M Countdown. On February 3, the trio released their second single "C'MON". The single first stage would be revealed on their upcoming solo concert.

== Discography ==
=== Extended Play ===
List of extended plays, with selected chart positions
Title	EP details	Peak chart positions			Sales
Title	EP details	JPN	JPN Comb.	JPN Hot	Sales
Let's Standing Show	Released: January 17, 2024; Label: Avex Trax; Catalog no.: AVCK-43281; Format: CD, streaming, digital download	15	22	13	JPN: 3,827

=== Singles ===
Title	Year	Peak chart positions		Sales	Album
Title	Year	KOR	JPN	Sales	Album
"Shattā Shimero" (シャッター閉めろ)	2023	–	–		Let's Standing Show
"Ceremony"	2023	–	–		Let's Standing Show
"Suit Up"	2024	– (Note: Did not chart in Circle Digital Chart but entered and peaked at no 59 on the component Download Chart)	–		Non-album single
"C'MON" (질러)	2024	–	–		Non-album single
"Joke" (조크든요)	2024	–	–		Non-album single
"Pon Pon"	2025	–	13	JPN: 4,979	Non-album single

== Concerts and tours ==
=== Headlining ===
- THE SHOW: Th3ee Guys (2024)
