= J-Min =

South Korean singer (born 1988)

J-Min 오지민
- Born: Oh Ji-min; May 27, 1988 (age 38); Seoul, South Korea
- Genres: Pop rock; ballad
- Occupations: Singer; songwriter; musical actress
- Instruments: Vocals; Piano; Guitar
- Years active: 2007–present
- Labels: SM; Avex Trax; EMI Records
- Website: Official website

- J-Min
- Hangul: 오지민
- Hanja: 吳志旼
- RR: O Jimin
- MR: O Chimin

Oh Ji-min (Korean: 오지민; born May 27, 1988), known professionally as J-Min (ジェイミン; 제이민), is a South Korean rock singer, songwriter, and musical actress. She made her debut in Japan in 2007 with the extended play (EP) Korogaru Ringo under Avex Trax. In 2012, she contributed to the soundtracks of several South Korean television dramas. She officially debuted in South Korea in 2014, with the release of the EP Shine.

== Career ==
=== 2007–2009: Debut ===
J-Min made her debut in Japan with her first extended play, Korogaru Ringo, on September 12, 2007.

On January 16, 2008, J-Min's second Japanese extended play, Dream On... was released. The release of her cover album The Singer followed on November 19, consisting of cover songs from several Japanese songs previously released.

J-Min released the single Change/One on May 27, 2009; it was used as the opening and ending theme for the TV anime adaptation of Hanasakeru Seishounen. It was later announced that J-Min was to perform as the opening act in TVXQ's Live Tour The Secret Code on May 30–31 at Fukuoka's Marine Messe.

=== 2012–2013: Original soundtracks, If You Want, musical roles and Heart Theatre ===
J-Min released several original soundtracks for dramas in 2012. She released the first soundtrack, titled "Hello, Love", for KBS2's drama Wild Romance on January 30. Her second soundtrack, titled "시공천 애", was released for MBC's drama God of War on April 13. The third soundtrack, titled "Can't Say It", was released for MBC's drama The King 2 Hearts on April 27. The fourth soundtrack, titled "Story", was released for KBS2's drama Sent from Heaven on July 2. The fifth soundtrack, titled "Stand Up", was released for SBS's drama To the Beautiful You on August 15, with a music video to follow on September 19. Aside from featuring early scenes from the drama series, it also included a guest appearance by TRAX's Jungmo. The band-performance version of the music video was unveiled on October 4. J-Min and Jungmo performed a special stage on Inkigayo on August 26. Her final soundtrack of 2012, titled "Beautiful Days", was released for KBS2's drama School 2013 on December 11.

In June 2012, J-Min started her musical career with the role of Gloria in the musical Jack the Ripper. The musical ran from June 1 to August 18, 2012, at Chungmu Art Hall in Seoul.

J-Min signed a contract with Nayutawave Records (since known as EMI Records) in 2012. She later released the single If You Want on November 21, 2012. Her single Heart Theater was released on March 13, 2013.

In February 2013, J-Min starred in the musical The Three Musketeers as Constance. It ran from February 20 to April 21, 2013, at Chungmu Art Hall in Seoul.

=== 2014–present: Cross The Border, domestic debut and musical activities ===
J-Min released her first Japanese album, Cross The Border on January 22, 2014. She also recorded the soundtrack Hero for MBC's drama Miss Korea. On June 19, she made her official Korean debut, performing Hoo on the music program M Countdown and various weekly music programs. Her pre-released single Hoo was released on June 24. Hoo is an acoustic ballad and a re-arrangement of Hero. Following the single, her extended play Shine was digitally released on July 18 and physically on July 21. Shine's music video featured Titan and starred SM Rookies' Ji Han-sol.

In 2015, J-Min played Vanessa in the musical In The Heights. She alternated performing the role with actress Oh Soyeon. The musical was produced by SM C&C, a subsidiary of S.M. Entertainment, and ran from September 4 to November 22 at Blue Square. In December 2015, J-Min confirmed that she would be playing Yitzhak in the musical Hedwig: New Makeup. The musical ran from March 1 to May 29, 2016, at Hongik University Art Center.

In April 2016, it was announced that J-Min would cast in the musical All Shock Up, performed at the Hongik University Daehangno Art Center Grand Theater from June 17 to August 28, 2016.

She released the single Way Back Home on July 8, 2016, as part of SM Entertainment's project SM Station. The song was composed by Shim Eunji and the music video starred Red Velvet's Yeri. She performed this song for the first time on SM Town Live World Tour V in Osaka.

On August 5, 2016, it was announced that she would release her digital single Ready For Your Love on August 9. Its music video, starring herself and NCT's Johnny, was released on August 9, along with the single. On October 15, she was confirmed to become radio host on Arirang Radio's SoundK for the "musictomusic corner".

In February 2017, J-Min was confirmed to be cast in the musical drama entitled Boys Over Flowers: The Musical. A musical version has previously been performed in Japan. She played the role of Tsukushi (or Geum Jan Di). The musical would run from February 24 to May 7, 2017, in Seoul. On March 17, she announced the release of a single, Alive, on March 20. In October 2017, J-Min was confirmed to return in the pop musical drama All Shock Up and scheduled to run 94 performances at the Hongik University Daehangno Art Center Grand Theater from November 24, 2017, to February 11, 2018.

In January 2018, it was announced that J-Min would return to played as Constance following the celebration of the 10th anniversary of the musical drama The Three Musketeers. In November 2018, she was confirmed to be cast in the musical drama The Days as Geunyeo, scheduled to be performed at the Busan Sohyang Theater Shinhan Card Hall from December 23–30, at the Daejeon Arts Center Art Hall on January 5–6, 2019 and then at the Seoul Blue Square Interpark Hall from February 22, 2019.

In November 2019, J-Min was confirmed to perform as Peggy in the musical A Better Tomorrow at the Hanwha Art Center from December 17, 2019, to March 22, 2020.

In September 2020, she was cast in the romantic-comedy musical Duet as Sonya Walsk. The musical ran from October 23 to January 31, 2021, at KT&G Sangsang Madang Daechi Art Hall.

In June 2021, musical drama Hedwig was announced to return after five years, with the return of J-Min as Itzhak for their fifth season. In November, J-Min collaborated with labelmates BoA, Siwon, Doyoung, Sunny, Taemin, Suho and Wendy as part of SM Town on the song "This is Your Day (for every child, UNICEF)".

In July 2022, she was confirmed to be cast in the musical drama L'art reste playing the role of Hyang-an, performed at Daehangno Dream Art Center 2 on September 6.

In May 2023, she was announced to return as Geunyeo in the musical The Days to celebrate its 10th anniversary, scheduled to be performed at the Seoul Arts Center Opera Theater from July 12 to September 3, 2023.

In July 2024, she returned to cast in the third season of musical drama Lizzy as Alice Russell. The musical was performed on September 14 at Doosan Art Center Yeongang Hall.

In November 2024, it was announced that she would perform with Hedwig's original author, John Cameron Mitchell, on December 24 and 25 at the Blue Square Mastercard Hall.

J-Min held her first concert, Just J-Min: J-Min's First Concert [To Jellys], on February 2–3, 2025, at Seoul's Gureumarae Small Theater. J-Min starred in the musical drama Hatshepsut, performed on March 11, 2025.

On March 31, 2025, she posted a handwritten note on her social media account, announcing that she had parted ways with SM Entertainment, after working with the company for 26 years.

== Discography ==
=== Studio albums ===
Title	Album details	Peak chart positions		Sales
Title	Album details	KOR	JPN	Sales
Cross The Border	Released: January 22, 2014 (JPN); Label: Nayutawave; Formats: CD, digital download	—	—	
"—" denotes releases that did not chart or were not released in that region.

=== Extended plays ===
Title	Album details	Peak chart positions		Sales
Title	Album details	KOR	JPN	Sales
Korogaru Ringo (ころがる林檎)	Released: September 12, 2007 (JPN); Label: Avex Trax; Formats: CD, digital download	—	—	
Dream on...	Released: January 16, 2008 (JPN); Label: Avex Trax; Formats: CD, digital download	—	—	
The Singer^{1}	Released: November 19, 2008 (JPN); Label: Avex Trax; Formats: CD, digital download	—	—	
Shine	Released: July 18, 2014 (KOR); Label: SM Entertainment; Formats: CD, digital download	18	—	KOR: 723+
"—" denotes releases that did not chart or were not released in that region.

=== Singles ===
Title	Year	Peak chart positions		Album
Title	Year	KOR	JPN	Album
"Korogaru Ringo"	2007	—	—	Korogaru Ringo
"Dream on..."	2008	—	—	Dream on...
"CHANGE"	2009	—	—	CHANGE/One (single)
"One"	2009	—	—	CHANGE/One (single)
"If You Want"	2012	—	—	Cross The Border
"Heart Theater"	2013	—	—	Cross The Border
"Sorry"	2014	—	—	Cross The Border
"Hoo"	2014	—	—	Shine
"Shine"	2014	—	—	Shine
"Way Back Home"	2016	—	—	SM Station Season 1
"Ready For Your Love"	2016	—	—	Non album-single
"Alive"	2017	—	—	Non album-single
"—" denotes songs that did not chart

=== Soundtrack appearances ===
Title	Year	Peak positions	Album
Title	Year	KOR	Album
"Hello, Love"	2012	—	Wild Romance Soundtrack
"시공천애"	2012	—	God of War Soundtrack
"Can't Say It"	2012	—	The King 2 Hearts Soundtrack
"Story"	2012	—	Sent from Heaven Soundtrack
"Stand Up"	2012	123	To the Beautiful You Soundtrack
"Beautiful Days"	2012	—	School 2013 Soundtrack
"Hero"	2014	—	Miss Korea Soundtrack
"—" denotes songs that did not chart

=== Other appearances ===
Title	Year	Other artist(s)	Album
"Happy X-Mas (War Is Over)"^{2}	2011	SM Town	2011 Winter SMTown – The Warmest Gift

== Videography ==
=== Music videos ===
Title	Year
Japanese
"Dream On..."	2008
"Change/One"	2009
"If You Want"	2012
"Heart Theater"	2013
"Cross The Border"	2014
"Sorry"	2014
Korean
"Hoo"	2014
"Shine"	2014
"Way Back Home"	2016
"Ready For Your Love"	2016
"Alive"	2017

== Concerts ==
=== Headlining ===
- 2008–2009 JAPAN Live Concert [J-Min Acoustic Live: The Singer]

=== Concert participation ===
- SMTown Live '10 World Tour (2010–11)
- SMTown Live World Tour III (2012–13)
- SM Town Live World Tour IV (2014–15)
- SM Town Live World Tour V (2016)
- SM Town Live World Tour VI (2017)

== Filmography ==
=== Variety shows ===
Year	Title	Network	Role	Notes
2017	King of Mask Singer	MBC	Contestant	March 19, as "I Am Forsythia"

== Theater ==
Year	Title	Role	Notes
Jack the Ripper	2012–2013	Gloria	
The Three Musketeers	2013–2014	Constance	
In the Heights	2015	Vanessa	
Hedwig: New Makeup	2016	Yitzhak	
All Shook Up	2016	Natalie	
In the Heights	2016–2017	Vannesa	Tokyo, Yokohama, Seoul
Boys Over Flowers: The Musical	2017	Tsukushi	
Hedwig	2017–2018	Yitzhak	
All Shook Up	2017–2018	Natalie	
The Three Musketeers	2018	Constance	
The Days	2018–2019	Her	
Something Rotten	2020	Bea Bottom	
Rach Hest	2022	Hyang-an	
