= Ready for Your Love (J-Min song) =

"Ready For Your Love"

Single by J-Min
- B-side: "Song On My Guitar"
- Released: August 9, 2016
- Recorded: 2016
- Genre: Urban pop; Pop rock
- Length: 3:54
- Label: S.M. Entertainment; KT Music
- Songwriters: Kenzie; Rebecca King; Brain Kim
- Producers: Stokley Williams; Samuel Engh; Anna Engh; Fredrik Lars Kempe

J-Min singles chronology
| "Way Back Home" (2016) | "Ready For Your Love" (2016) |

"Ready For Your Love" is a song recorded by South Korean singer J-Min. The song marketed as "third digital single", released by S.M. Entertainment on August 9, 2016 and distributed by KT Music.

== Background and composition ==
On August 5, 2016 S.M. Entertainment announced that J-Min would be releasing her new digital single "Ready For Your Love" and its B-side track "Song On My Guitar" on August 9. The title track "Ready For Your Love" is an urban-pop, which describe about a woman who is ready for new love after overcoming the pains for the past and the B-side track "Song On My Guitar" is a modern rock, which is the Korean version of track from her Japanese album, "Cross The Border".

The music video of the title track "Ready For Your Love" was starred by her with SM Rookies (then member of NCT) Johnny.

== Track listing ==
| No. | Title | Lyrics | Music | Length |
|---|---|---|---|---|
| 1. | "Ready For Your Love" | Kenzie, Rebecca King | Stokley Williams | 3:54 |
| 2. | "Song On My Guitar" | Brain Kim | Samuel Engh; Anna Engh; Fredrik Lars Kempe | 3:18 |
