= Shindong =

South Korean rapper and singer (born 1985)

- 신동희
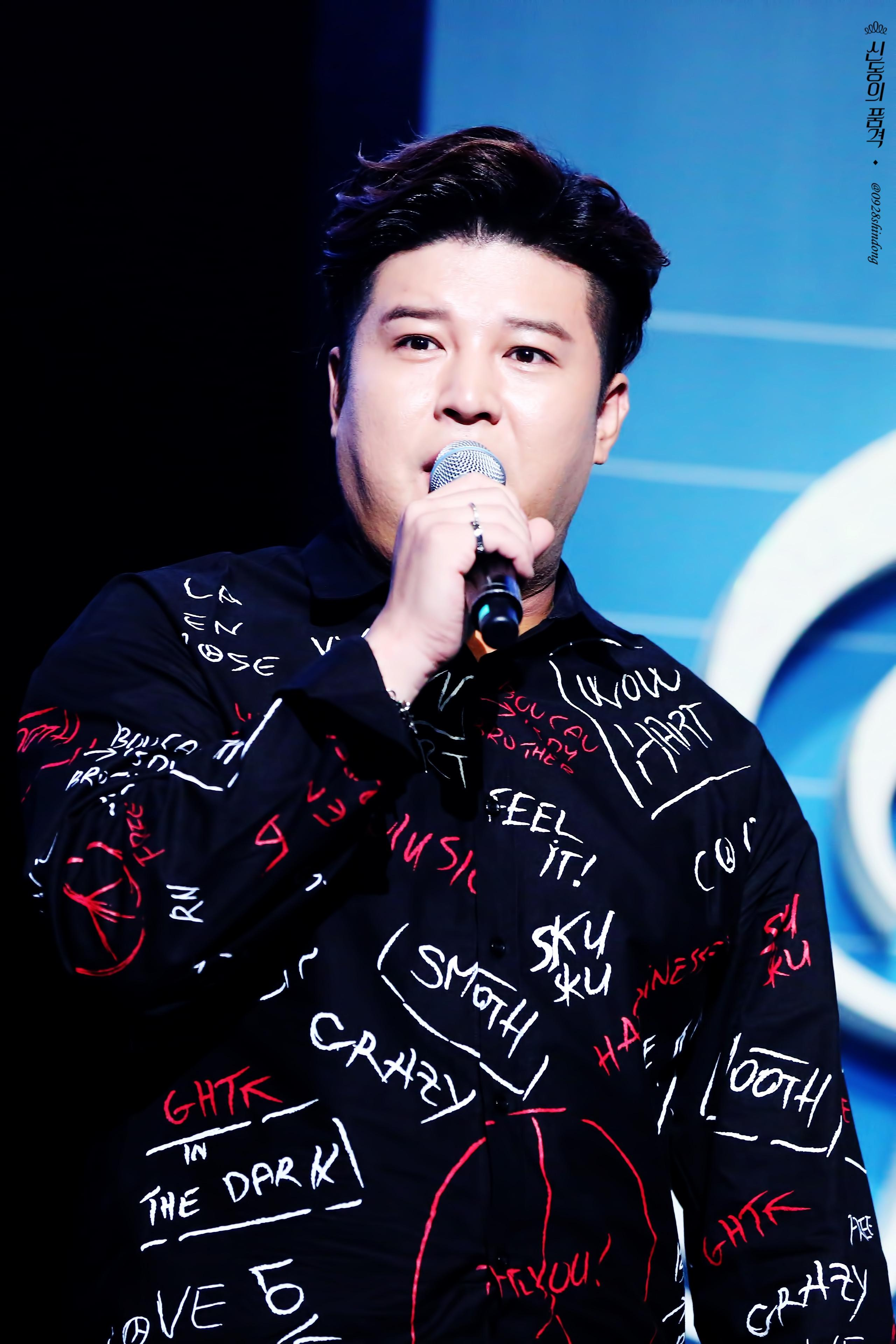
- Shindong at the 2017 Snowball concert
- Born: Shin Dong-hee; September 28, 1985 (age 41); Suwon, Gyeonggi-do, South Korea
- Other name: Shindong
- Occupations: Rapper; singer; dancer; host; radio personality; video director
- Musical career
- Genres: K-pop; electronic; dance; R&B
- Instrument: Vocals
- Years active: 2005–present
- Labels: SM; Label SJ
- Member of: Super Junior; Super Junior-T; Super Junior-H; Super Junior-L.S.S.; SM Town
- Website: Official website

Korean name
- Hangul: 신동희
- Hanja: 申東熙
- RR: Sin Donghui
- MR: Sin Tonghŭi

Stage name
- Hangul: 신동
- Hanja: 神童
- RR: Sindong
- MR: Sindong

Signature
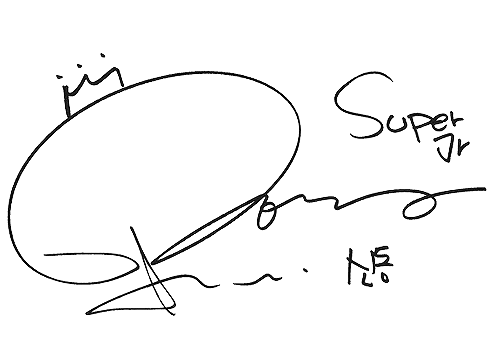

Shin Dong-hee (Korean: 신동희; born September 28, 1985), known professionally as Shindong (lit. meaning: "prodigy"), is a South Korean rapper, singer, dancer, host, radio personality, and video director. He is best known as a member of Super Junior and its subgroups Super Junior-T, Super Junior-H, and Super Junior-L.S.S.

== Career ==
=== Pre-debut ===
Shin Dong-hee was born in Suwon, Gyeonggi-do on September 28, 1985. Little is known about Shindong's personal life, and many thought he was an only child. He has a younger sister named Ahn Da Young. With a love for dancing, Shindong signed up for the 2002 Goyangsi Youth Dance contest and won grand prize. A year later, he joined the contest again and won gold. In 2004, Shindong joined the Mnet Epi Contest and won both the gold prize and popularity award. In 2005, Shindong signed up for the SM Best Youth Contest and won first place for Best Comedian, and won the grand prize. He signed a contract with SM Entertainment and received lessons to further improve his dancing ability.

Months after joining the company, Shindong was put in the large all-boy rotational group Super Junior as a member of its first generation, Super Junior 05. He decided to use the stage name 'Shindong' as his birth name sounds similar to bandmate Donghae. 'Shindong' is derived from his surname and the first character of his birth name, meaning "child prodigy".

=== Super Junior ===
Shindong officially debuted as part of 12-member project group Super Junior 05 on November 6, 2005, on SBS's music programme Popular Songs, performing their first single, "Twins (Knock Out)". Their debut album SuperJunior05 (Twins) was released a month later on December 5, and debuted at number three on the monthly MIAK K-pop album charts.

In March 2006, SM Entertainment began to recruit new members for the next Super Junior generation. However, plans changed and the company declared a halt in forming future Super Junior generations. Following the addition of thirteenth member Kyuhyun, the group dropped the suffix "05" and became officially credited as Super Junior. The re-polished group's first CD single "U" was released on June 7, 2006, which was their most successful single until the release of "Sorry, Sorry" in March 2009.

During his career with Super Junior, Shindong was put into two subgroups, smaller groups that are branched off of the larger Super Junior group. In February 2007, he was placed in the trot-singing Super Junior-T. A year later, he became a member of Super Junior-H.

On September 27, 2011, he along with Yesung and Eunhyuk filled in for bandmate Heechul, who enlisted for mandatory military service on September 1, during the performance on Music Bank and Show! Music Core of Kim Jang-hoon latest single, "Breakups are So Like Me". Heechul is featured in the song and starred in the music video, which was completed the day before he enlisted.

On July 5, 2023, Super Junior-L.S.S., a sub-unit group consisting of Super Junior bandmates Shindong, Siwon and Leeteuk, debuted with their first Japanese single "Close The Shutter". The trio later made their official Korean debut on January 22, 2024, with the single "Suit Up".

=== Solo activities ===
==== Hosting ====
In November 2005, following Super Junior 05's debut, Shindong became an emcee on Mnet's music program M! Countdown, alongside Leeteuk and Kangin. The trio hosted together until August 2007, when Kangin was replaced by Eunhyuk. The new trio's final day of hosting was on March 27, 2008.

Shindong is popularly known as an active emcee and radio host of MBC's BoBoBo Ai Joa and KMTV's Green Apple Sound, successfully establishing the image, "DJ Shindong." Shindong left Green Apple Sound to host MBC's Stop the Boring Time Radio with Kim Shin-young.

From 2009, Shindong, along with Eunhyuk and Leeteuk, had been regular guests on SBS's Strong Heart, where they hosted a special segment, Boom Academy, headed by entertainer Boom. On March 28, 2012, SM Entertainment announced Shindong's departure from the show. As of the April 10, 2012, broadcast, following the change in MCs and his departure, the show was re-vamped with Leeteuk and Eunhyuk, Kim Hyo-jin, Jung Ju-ri and Yang Se-hyung, billed as the 'six-fixed guests'.

==== Acting ====
While Shindong had prior acting experiences as a comedian, his acting debut was in the Super Junior film Attack on the Pin-Up Boys, which premiered on July 26, 2007. In 2008, Shindong played a major supporting role in the mini television series Single Dad in Love and also participated in the drama's original soundtrack. He and radio partner Kim Shin-young appeared in an episode of popular MBC drama Queen of Housewives.

== Personal life ==
=== Car accident ===
On April 19, 2007, almost two months after Super Junior-T's release of their first single "Rokuko", Leeteuk and Kyuhyun became seriously injured in a car wreck, along with Shindong, Eunhyuk, and two managers, when returning home after a recording of the radio show Super Junior Kiss the Radio. While they were on the highway, the front left tire burst as the driver was switching lanes, and the van ran into the guard rail/median on the driver's side and skidded for about 30 metres. At some point, the momentum caused the van to flip over on its right side.

While Shindong and Eunhyuk suffered minor injuries, Leeteuk and Kyuhyun sustained more serious injuries, which required both to be hospitalised. Leeteuk had glass shards embedded in his back and above his eyes, requiring over 170 stitches. Kyuhyun, who was sitting behind the driver's seat when the wreck occurred, was the most injured and had a fractured hip, pneumothorax from broken ribs, and facial scratches and bruises.

=== Military enlistment ===
On November 5, 2014, S.M. Entertainment announced that Shindong would enlist in the army on November 25, 2014. However, due to a back problem, his enlistment was delayed until a further date the next year. On March 24, 2015, Shindong quietly enlisted in the military without any fanfare or interviews with the press. He was scheduled to enter his service in Incheon. He was discharged from his military duty on December 23, 2016, after serving 21 months of active duty at the 55th army division's military band.

=== Relationship ===
On January 1, 2023, Shindong confirmed that he is dating a non-celebrity woman younger than him.

== Discography ==
- Please (2011) with Leeteuk
- Marry Man (2017) with UV
- Cheer Man (2019) with UV

=== Songwriting credits ===
All song credits are adapted from the Korea Music Copyright Association's (KOMCA) database unless noted otherwise.

Year	Song	Album	Artist(s)	Lyrics		Music	
Year	Song	Album	Artist(s)	Credit	With	Credit	With
2011	"Oops!"	A-Cha	Super Junior and F(x)	Yes	Lee Dong-hae, Leeteuk, Eunhyuk, Kim Hee-chul, Misfit	No	
2017	"Marry Man"	Non-album single	Shindong and UV	Yes	Yoo Se-yoon, Muzie	No	
2017	"Marry Man" (Space Cowboy Remix)	Non-album single	Shindong and UV	Yes	Yoo Se-yoon, Muzie	No	
2017	"Charm of Life"	Non-album single	Shindong, Eunhyuk, Heechul, and Solar	Yes	Boi B, Mr. Cho, Eunhyuk, Kim Hee-chul	No	
2018	"Iriwa"	Non-album single	Pink Fantasy	Yes	WithRu	Yes	WithRu
2019	"K.R.Y Dance Performance"	Super Show 8: Infinite Time	Super Junior-K.R.Y	No		Yes	WithRu
2019	"Not Beautiful"	Non-album single	Pink Fantasy	Yes	WithRu	Yes	WithRu
2020	"What Is Your Name?"	Bad Liar	Super Junior-D&E	Yes	WithRu, Eunhyuk	No	
2021	"Iriwa" (2021 version)	Alice in Wonderland	Pink Fantasy	Yes	WithRu	Yes	WithRu
2021	"Rain"	Tales of the Unusual	Pink Fantasy	Yes	WithRu	Yes	WithRu
2023	"Close the Shutter"	Let's Standing Show	Super Junior-L.S.S.	Yes	Hideo Toyosaki	No	
2024	"Joke"	Non-album single	Super Junior-L.S.S.	Yes	Gesture, Kim Hye-jung, Bir$day	Yes	Gesture, Lee Beom-heon, Bir$day

== Filmography ==
=== Film ===
Date	Title	Role	Note(s)	Ref.
2007	Attack on the Pin-Up Boys	Ultra Junior member		
2007	Alvin and the Chipmunks	Theodore	Voice role, Korean dub	
2010	Alpha and Omega	Humphrey	Voice role, Korean dub	
2011	Super Show 3 3D	Himself		
2012	I AM. - SM Town Live World Tour in Madison Square Garden	Himself		
2013	Super Show 4 3D	Himself		

=== Television series ===
Year	Title	Role	Note(s)	Ref.
2008	Single Dad in Love	Oh Chil-goo		
2009	Queen of Housewives	Boyfriend in jjimjilbang	Cameo	
2010	Dr. Champ	Kang Woo-ram		
2011	All My Love for You	Geum-ji's blind date	Cameo (Episode 43–44)	
2024	DNA Lover	Karaoke box employee	Episode 5	

=== Web series ===
Year	Title	Role	Notes	Ref.
2021	ONAIR - Secret Contract		Cameo	

=== Television shows ===
Year	Title	Role	Notes	Ref.
2005	Show Music Tank	Host		
2005	Infinite Challenge	Cast Member		
2005–2006	Hello Wong	Host		
2005–2008	M! Countdown	Host		
2007	Radio Star	Host		
2007–2008	Green Apple Sound	TV DJ		
2007–2009	Popopo	Host		
2008	Unbelievable Outing	Host		
2008	Dancing Dragon Brothers	Host		
2009	Human Network Miracle	Host		
2009	Windfall	Host		
2009–2010	Lord of the Rings	Host		
2009–2012	Strong Heart	Host		
2012–2014	Beatles Code	Host	Seasons 2–3	
2014	Star Gazing	Regular Member	Pilot episode	
2014	Idol Futsal World Cup	Main Host		
2016–2018	Game Show Yoo Hee Nak Rak	Host		
2017	Heart Signal	Cast		
2017	Sixth Sense Hit Show 1/N	Host		
2017	King of Mask Singer	Contestant	Apegujeong Orange in episode 99	
2017	Law of the Jungle in Wild New Zealand	Cast member	Episodes 265–270	
2017–2018	I Can See Your Voice	Regular Member (Tone-deaf detective)	Seasons 4–5	
2018	Begin A Game	Main Host		
2018	Miracle Project Pick Me Pick Me	Host		
2018–present	Great Escape	Cast member	Seasons 1–4	
2019	Game Dolympic 2019: Golden Card	Host		
2019	300 X2	Cast member	As "Singalong Fairies"	
2019	Wanna Play? GG	Cast member		
2019	Today's Fortune	Panel	Episodes 1–6, 13–19	
2019	Eye Contact	Main Host		
2019–present	Knowing Bros	Special Host		
2020	2020 Idol Star Athletics Championships	E-sports Commentator		
2020	Dancing Idol	Host		
2020	Idol Battlegrounds	Host		
2020	2020 Idol E-Sports Athletics Championships	Host		
2020–2021	Idol Challenge: Another Class	Host	Seasons 1–2	
2021	Friends	Host		
2021	Love Master	Host	Season 1–2	
2021	Love Mafia	Host		
2022	My Teenage Girl	Host	Lunar New Year Holiday Special Items	
2022	Other World Used Cars-Gear GODs	Host		
2022	Youth Star	Special angel	Episode 5	
2022	Boss in the Mirror	Boss	with Leeteuk	
2022	Buddy Boys	Cast Member		
2022	Idol League	Host	with Dayoung; Season 4	
2023	Empty Nesters - Suri Suri Village Suri	Host	Season 3	

=== Web shows ===
Year	Title	Role	Notes	Ref.
2019	Analog Trip	Cast member		
2019–2020	Legend Club: Heechul's Shindong PC Room	Host		
2020–2021	People Who Buy Time - About Time	Host		
2021	Tell Me Something	Host		
2022	World Boys	Global citizen	Produced by World Vision	
2022	Love Mafia	Host		
2022	Meet Me	Host		
2022	The Door: To Wonderland	Cast Member	Season 1–2	
2023	Knight of the Lamp	Cast Member	with Leeteuk, Donghae, Eunhyuk, Ryeowook and Kyuhyun	

=== Radio shows ===
Year	Title	Role	Notes	Ref.
2008–2014	SJ Shindong's Shim Shim Ta Pa (Stop the Boring Time)	DJ		

=== Music videos ===
==== Appearances ====
Year	Music video	Artist
2007	"Flight Girl"	Mogoply
2011	"Oppa, Oppa" (Shindong Version)	Donghae & Eunhyuk
2012	"Oppa, Oppa" (Japanese Version) (ft Sungmin & Shindong)	Donghae & Eunhyuk
2022	"I hate trot" (나는 트로트가 싫어요)	Im Chang-jung

==== Direction ====
Year	Music video	Artist
2011	"Oppa, Oppa" (Shindong Version)	Donghae & Eunhyuk
2017	"Lemonade Love"	Parc Jae-jung, Mark (NCT)
2017	"One More Chance"	Super Junior
2017	"Rebirth"	Red Velvet
2018	"Celeb Five (I Wanna Be a Celeb)"	Celeb Five
2018	"Falling Blossoms"	Universe Cowards
2018	"Teenager"	Samuel (featuring Lee Ro-han)
2018	"The Lonely Flame"	Zhou Mi
2019	"Cheer Man"	Shindong, UV
2019	"Fantasy"	Pink Fantasy
2019	"Old Movie"	Heechul
2020	"Delete"	Koyote
2020	"Hanryang (produced by DinDin)"	Universe Hipsters (featuring Bibi)
2020	"Spicy Love"	Capsai Shin (with narration by DOKO)
2021	"Hot Cool Sexy"	Davicher
2021	"Hey U"	MAKAMAKA
2021	"Do Not U turn"	Park Koon
2022	"Nae Jigab-e Inneun don da Gatttassora" (lit. Take all the money in my wallet)	Copy Chu
2023	"I Can't Go to Shinchon"	Postmen
2023	"Saranghaji Ahn-eulgeoya" (lit. I won't love you)	Chu Hwa-jeong
2024	"Suit Up"	Super Junior-L.S.S.
2024	"C'MON"	Super Junior-L.S.S.
2024	"Let Me Love" (prod. Jin Young)	Unicode

== Awards and nominations ==
Name of the award ceremony, year presented, category, nominee of the award, and the result of the nomination
Award ceremony	Year	Category	Nominee / Work	Result	Ref.
MBC Drama Awards	2009	Excellence Award in Radio	Shindong and Kim Shin-young's ShimShimTapa	Won	
MBC Entertainment Awards	2013	Top Excellence Award in Radio	Shindong's Shim Shim Ta Pa	Won	
Melon Music Awards	2012	MBC Music Star Award	Shin Dong (with Kim Shin-young); Show Champion	Won	
SBS Entertainment Awards	2010	New Star Award	Strong Heart	Won	
SBS Entertainment Awards	2011	Best Entertainer Award in Talk Show	Strong Heart	Won	
SM Youth Best Contest	2005	Best Gag	Shin Dong-hee	1st	
SM Youth Best Contest	2005	Grand Prize	Shin Dong-hee	Won	
