= Mr. Simple =

Album by Super Junior

- Digital and A version cover.

Studio album by Super Junior
- Released: 3 August 2011
- Recorded: June–July 2011
- Studios: Doobdoob (Seoul); HUB (Seoul); SM Blue Cup (Seoul); SM Blue Ocean (Seoul); SM Booming System (Seoul); SM Concert Hall (Seoul); SM Yellow Tail (Seoul); T (Seoul)
- Genres: K-pop; synth-pop; R&B; pop-rock
- Length: 47:44 (version A); 47:41 (version B); 61:12 (repackaged)
- Language: Korean
- Labels: SM; KMP
- Producer: Lee Soo-man

Super Junior chronology
| Bonamana (2010) | Mr. Simple (2011) | Sexy, Free & Single (2012) |

Singles from Mr. Simple
- 1. "Mr. Simple" Released: 2 August 2011; 2. "Superman" Released: 22 August 2011

Repackaged edition cover
- Digital cover

Singles from A-Cha
- 1. "A-Cha" Released: 19 September 2011

Mr. Simple (reissue name A-Cha) is the fifth studio album by the South Korean boy band Super Junior. It was released on 3 August 2011, by SM Entertainment, distributed by KMP Holdings and digitally release on 2 August. On 19 September 2011, a repackaged edition was released, re-titled A-Cha. It features four new tracks including title track "A-Cha" and "Superman" which was previously released in version B only. This is the group's second album that features ten of the original 13 members and the first being their previous album, Bonamana (2010).

At the year end award shows of 2011, the album won the Disk Daesang Award at the 26th Golden Disk Awards and 21st Seoul Music Awards, as well as the Album of the Year at the 13th Mnet Asian Music Awards. The album, including the repackaged version, is listed as the 2nd best-selling album of the year for 2011. According to Gaon Chart, as of the end of December 2012, the album has sold a cumulative total of 543,623 copies domestically.

== Background and development ==
On 31 March 2011, leader Leeteuk announced during the interview, "At the earliest, we'll be coming out with our fifth album this summer." Leeteuk and Eunhyuk confirmed on their radio show "Super Junior Kiss the Radio" on 1 June 2011, that they had begun recording their upcoming album that day. Heechul tweeted on 2 June 2011, saying that the group "may be going crazy with preparations for our fifth album, but when it's finally released, you're all going to go mad." American dancer Kenny Wormald posted on his official Twitter on 11 July 2011, that he had started the choreography rehearsal for the group's upcoming new single. On the same day, Leeteuk and Eunhyuk stated on their radio show "Super Junior Kiss the Radio" that songwriter Jinu (hitchhiker) had contributed something for the new album. Shim Jae Won, current choreographer and former member of the disbanded SM group Black Beat tweeted two pictures of the choreography practice of the group showing the lower half of their bodies.

The first of the teaser photos was released on 20 July 2011, featuring Eunhyuk. Other photos followed, in order of: Donghae, Leeteuk, Shindong, Kyuhyun, Sungmin, Ryeowook, Yesung, Siwon and Heechul. On the same day, it was announced that the album is set for an 3 August release.

== Music and video ==
The album is mostly synthpop, with the title track, "Mr. Simple", being the last installation of the "SJ Funky" genre in which the group has been consistently pursuing since "Sorry, Sorry" (2009) and "Bonamana" (2010). Songs encompassed with synthpop elements include "Opera", "Be My Girl", "Walkin'" and "My Love My Kiss My Heart". Other tracks included in the album are the country-flavored tracks "Good Friends" and "Sunflower", an electropop number "Feels Good", a cover of a 1996 song by Jinu (hitchhiker) entitled "White Christmas", ballads "Storm" and "Memories", a Donghae-Chance-written track "Y", as well as the inclusion of subgroup Super Junior-M's Korean version of their 2011 title track "Perfection", in which it serves a purpose "to give a chance to Korean fans to enjoy the music of Super Junior-M which is appearing in various stages in Asia." Meanwhile, for the B-version of the album, a further-included track "Superman" is described to be "a minimalist hip-hop track which feature the members singing in a low vocal range."

On 22 to 24 July 2011, the group filmed the music video for their new lead single. Two video teasers were released on 1 August 2011, in which the first teaser gained a million views on YouTube a day after its release and 2,500,000 views by the second day. Meanwhile, the second teaser passing a million views by the second day. The music video reached more than half a million views within the first few hours of release. It passed 1.5 million views by the end of the first day, and 3 million by the end of the second, views. On 26 August 2011, a music video for the album's supporting single, "Superman", was released on their YouTube channel, featuring clips from their Super Show 3 Tour as well as the photoshoots and music video making for "Mr. Simple".

On 1 November 2015, the music video officially reached 100 million views on YouTube. On 30 July 2021, the music video officially reached 200 million views on YouTube.

== Promotion and release ==
The group held a press conference at the Imperial Palace Hotel in Seoul on 4 August, which attracted over 200 reporters, including 70 foreign journalists from Japan, China, Taiwan, Thailand, Hong Kong and Singapore The group expressed that they will promote the album for as long as possible till Heechul's enlistment date and also to continue with Super Show 4 World Tour. Super Junior had their debut performance of "Mr. Simple" and a non-album track "Superman" at Music Bank on 5 August 2011, followed by Music Core the following day, Inkigayo after that and on 11 August on M! Countdown. However, promotions for the song ended on 28 August due to the enlistment of member Heechul to the army on 1 September 2011.

The album was released in 11 countries across Asia., including Taiwan on 6 September 2011, by Avex Taiwan. The album was supposed to be pre-released in the Philippines by Universal Records on 1 October 2011, but was moved to 8 October, citing manufacturing problems caused by typhoon Nesat. The Type A album was officially released in the country on 24 November. After the released of "Mr Simple" in Japanese, the group followed-up with the release of "Opera" in Japanese. The single album also include the travel-themed mid-tempo ballad "Way", Japanese original music video and making-of DVD. It has been available for pre-order from 11 March 2012.

== Reception ==
=== Critical reception ===
Music critic Han Dong-yoon from webzine IZM expressed boredom with the song "Mr. Simple" due to repetition of the same lyrics and "techno-type electronic sounds"; he additionally criticized the "distorted vocals" which made identifying the members difficult, "except for a few people". Han also found similar patterns in the tracks "Opera" and "Be My Girl", but was more favorable towards the ballad tracks such as "Memories", "Sunflower" and "Y", referring to them as "clean[ing] up the place they left".

=== Commercial performance ===
The album debuted at number 3 on Billboard World Albums Chart for the week of 20 August 2011. It peaked at number one on the Gaon Album Chart for the month of August, with 287,427 copies sold. Meanwhile, the repackaged album, A-Cha, which was released on 19 September, debuted at number three with 97,210 copies sold. At the year-end list of album sales for 2011, compiled by Gaon Chart, the album is listed as the second best-selling album of the year with 343,348 copies sold and the repackaged version at number seven with 129,894 copies sold. Thus making a cumulative total sale of 473,242 copies in South Korea.

On 12 April 2012, Gaon Chart reported that up till the end of March 2012, the album has sold a cumulative total of 502,830 copies, making it the first album in four years to exceed half a million in sales since Kim Gun Mo's eighth album He-story in 2003 and TVXQ's fourth album, Mirotic in 2008. The released in the Philippines on 8 October, peaked at number one in Odyssey Weekly Album Chart. After a week of selling the album reached gold status with standout sales of 7,500. This was the group's 5th number one album and 4th album to certify gold status in the country making them the only Korean act to do so.

== Track listing ==
Mr. Simple Version A track listing
| No. | Title | Lyrics | Music | Arrangement | Length |
|---|---|---|---|---|---|
| 1. | "Mr. Simple" | Yoo Young-jin | Yoo Young-jin | Yoo Young-jin | 3:59 |
| 2. | "Opera" (오페라; Opera) | Kenzie | Thomas Troelsen; Engelina Larsen | Kenzie | 3:01 |
| 3. | "Be My Girl" (라라라라; Lalalala) | Kim Boo-min | GoodWill & MGI; Aku Rannila; J-Son | Hitchhiker; GoodWill & MGI; Aku Rannila; J-Son | 3:09 |
| 4. | "Walkin'" | Misfit | iDR (C2); 12Keyz (C2); Sharif Slater; Ryan S. Jhun | C2; Sharif Slater; Ryan S. Jhun | 3:46 |
| 5. | "Storm" (폭풍; Pokpung) | Kim Jeong-bae | Kenzie | Kenzie; Nile Lee | 4:16 |
| 6. | "Good Friends" (어느새 우린; Eoneusae Urin; lit. 'Suddenly we') | Yoon Jong-shin | Yoon Jong-shin | Kim Dong-ha; Shinchi | 3:57 |
| 7. | "Feels Good" (결투; Gyeoltu; lit. 'Duel') | Hong Ji-yoo | Denniz Jamm; Qwan | Hwang Seong-je (ButterFly); Q (ButterFly) | 3:19 |
| 8. | "Memories" (기억을 따라; Gieogeul Ttara; lit. 'Follow the memory') | Park Joon-soo; Lee Yoon-jong | Park Joon-soo | Park Joon-soo; Nile Lee | 4:11 |
| 9. | "Sunflower" (해바라기; Haebaragi) | Hong Ji-yoo | Brandon Fraley | Hwang Seong-je (BJJ Music); Kim Yong-hyun (BJJ Music) | 3:52 |
| 10. | "White Christmas" (엉뚱한 상상; Eongttunghan Sangsang; lit. 'Crazy imagination') | Hitchhiker; Eunhyuk | Hitchhiker | Hitchhiker | 3:36 |
| 11. | "Y" | Super Junior-D&E; Chance | Lee Donghae; Chance; Super D | Chance; Super D; Park Cham | 3:27 |
| 12. | "My Love, My Kiss, My Heart" | Tesung Kim (Iconic Sounds) | iDR (C2); 12Keyz (C2); Sharif Slater; Ryan S. Jhun | Kim Yong-sin (Iconic Sounds); Tesung Kim (Iconic Sounds) | 3:40 |
| 13. | "Perfection" (태완미; Taewanmi) (Korean version) (performed by Super Junior-M) (bonus track) | Lee Won-geun | Mikkel Remee Sigvardt; Thomas Troelsen | Hitchhiker | 3:24 |
| Total length: | | | | | 47:37 |

Mr. Simple Version B track listing
| No. | Title | Lyrics | Music | Arrangement | Length |
|---|---|---|---|---|---|
| 1. | "Superman" | Yoo Young-jin | Yoo Young-jin | Yoo Young-jin | 3:21 |
| 2. | "Mr. Simple" | Yoo Young-jin | Yoo Young-jin | Yoo Young-jin | 3:59 |
| 3. | "Opera" (오페라; Opera) | Kenzie | Thomas Troelsen; Engelina Larsen | Kenzie | 3:01 |
| 4. | "Be My Girl" (라라라라; Lalalala) | Kim Boo-min | GoodWill & MGI; Aku Rannila; J-Son | Hitchhiker; GoodWill & MGI; Aku Rannila; J-Son | 3:09 |
| 5. | "Walkin'" | Misfit | iDR (C2); 12Keyz (C2); Sharif Slater; Ryan S. Jhun | C2; Sharif Slater; Ryan S. Jhun | 3:46 |
| 6. | "Storm" (폭풍; Pokpung) | Kim Jeong-bae | Kenzie | Kenzie; Nile Lee | 4:16 |
| 7. | "Good Friends" (어느새 우린; Eoneusae Urin; lit. 'Suddenly we') | Yoon Jong-shin | Yoon Jong-shin | Kim Dong-ha; Shinchi | 3:57 |
| 8. | "Feels Good" (결투; Gyeoltu; lit. 'Duel') | Hong Ji-yoo | Denniz Jamm; Qwan | Hwang Seong-je (ButterFly); Q (ButterFly) | 3:19 |
| 9. | "Memories" (기억을 따라; Gieogeul Ttara; lit. 'Follow the memory') | Park Joon-soo; Lee Yoon-jong | Park Joon-soo | Park Joon-soo; Nile Lee | 4:11 |
| 10. | "Sunflower" (해바라기; Haebaragi) | Hong Ji-yoo | Brandon Fraley | Hwang Seong-je (BJJ Music); Kim Yong-hyun (BJJ Music) | 3:52 |
| 11. | "White Christmas" (엉뚱한 상상; Eongttunghan Sangsang; lit. 'Crazy imagination') | Hitchhiker; Eunhyuk | Hitchhiker | Hitchhiker | 3:36 |
| 12. | "Y" | Super Junior-D&E; Chance | Lee Donghae; Chance; Super D | Chance; Super D; Park Cham | 3:27 |
| 13. | "My Love, My Kiss, My Heart" | Tesung Kim (Iconic Sounds) | iDR (C2); 12Keyz (C2); Sharif Slater; Ryan S. Jhun | Kim Yong-sin (Iconic Sounds); Tesung Kim (Iconic Sounds) | 3:40 |
| Total length: | | | | | 47:34 |

A-Cha Repackage track listing
| No. | Title | Lyrics | Music | Arrangement | Length |
|---|---|---|---|---|---|
| 1. | "Superman" | Yoo Young-jin | Yoo Young-jin | Yoo Young-jin | 3:21 |
| 2. | "A-Cha" | Kim Boo-min | Hitchhiker | Hitchhiker | 3:18 |
| 3. | "Mr. Simple" | Yoo Young-jin | Yoo Young-jin | Yoo Young-jin | 3:59 |
| 4. | "Oops!" (featuring f(x)) | Leeteuk; Heechul; Shindong; Eunhyuk; Donghae; Misfit | Kalle Engström; William J. Fuller | Kalle Engström; William J. Fuller; Hitchhiker | 3:44 |
| 5. | "A Day" (하루에; Harue) | Kim Jeong-bae | Kenzie | Kenzie; Nile Lee | 3:27 |
| 6. | "Andante" (안단테; Andante) | Misfit | Leeteuk; Henry Lau; Q (ButterFly) | Q (ButterFly) | 3:06 |
| 7. | "Opera" (오페라; Opera) | Kenzie | Thomas Troelsen; Engelina Larsen | Kenzie | 3:01 |
| 8. | "Be My Girl" (라라라라; Lalalala) | Kim Boo-min | GoodWill & MGI; Aku Rannila; J-Son | Hitchhiker; GoodWill & MGI; Aku Rannila; J-Son | 3:09 |
| 9. | "Walkin'" | Misfit | iDR (C2); 12Keyz (C2); Sharif Slater; Ryan S. Jhun | C2; Sharif Slater; Ryan S. Jhun | 3:46 |
| 10. | "Storm" (폭풍; Pokpung) | Kim Jeong-bae | Kenzie | Kenzie; Nile Lee | 4:16 |
| 11. | "Good Friends" (어느새 우린; Eoneusae Urin; lit. 'Suddenly we') | Yoon Jong-shin | Yoon Jong-shin | Kim Dong-ha; Shinchi | 3:57 |
| 12. | "Feels Good" (결투; Gyeoltu; lit. 'Duel') | Hong Ji-yoo | Denniz Jamm; Qwan | Hwang Seong-je (ButterFly); Q (ButterFly) | 3:19 |
| 13. | "Memories" (기억을 따라; Gieogeul Ttara; lit. 'Follow the memory') | Park Joon-soo; Lee Yoon-jong | Park Joon-soo | Park Joon-soo; Nile Lee | 4:11 |
| 14. | "Sunflower" (해바라기; Haebaragi) | Hong Ji-yoo | Brandon Fraley | Hwang Seong-je (BJJ Music); Kim Yong-hyun (BJJ Music) | 3:52 |
| 15. | "White Christmas" (엉뚱한 상상; Eongttunghan Sangsang; lit. 'Crazy imagination') | Hitchhiker; Eunhyuk | Hitchhiker | Hitchhiker | 3:36 |
| 16. | "Y" | Super Junior-D&E; Chance | Lee Donghae; Chance; Super D | Chance; Super D; Park Cham | 3:27 |
| 17. | "My Love, My Kiss, My Heart" | Tesung Kim (Iconic Sounds) | iDR (C2); 12Keyz (C2); Sharif Slater; Ryan S. Jhun | Kim Yong-sin (Iconic Sounds); Tesung Kim (Iconic Sounds) | 3:40 |
| Total length: | | | | | 61:12 |

== Charts ==
=== Weekly charts ===
| Chart (2011) | Peak position |
|---|---|
| Japanese Albums (Oricon) | 17 |
| South Korean Albums (Gaon) | 1 |
| US Heatseekers Albums (Billboard) | 41 |
| US World Albums (Billboard) | 3 |

=== Monthly charts ===
| Chart (August 2011) | Peak position |
|---|---|
| South Korean Albums (Gaon) | 1 |

=== Year-end charts ===
| Chart (2011) | Position |
|---|---|
| South Korean Albums (Gaon) | 2 |

== Personnel ==
Credits are for the Type A of the album, unless where indicated.

- Super Junior – vocals, background vocals
  - Leeteuk – vocals,
  - Heechul– vocals, rap
  - Yesung – lead vocals, background vocals
  - Shindong – vocals, rap
  - Sungmin – lead vocals, background vocals
  - Eunhyuk – vocals, rap
  - Siwon – vocals
  - Donghae – vocals, rap
  - Ryeowook – lead vocals, background vocals
  - Kyuhyun – lead vocals, background vocals
- Super Junior-M – vocals, background vocals (Perfection)
  - Zhoumi – vocals
  - Henry – vocals, rap
- Yoo Young-jin – background vocals
- Kang Sung-ho – background vocals
- Park Il – background vocals
- Chance (One Way) – background vocals
- Hitchhiker – background vocals, guitar, keyboard, synth and beat arrangements, bass, sound processing
- Thomas Troelsen – background vocals
- TST – brass section
- Choi Won-hyuk – bass
- Kim Jung-bae – guitar
- Lee Hwa – piano
- Yoong – string section
- Shin Seok-chul – drums
- Choi Hoon – bass
- Cho Jeong-chi – guitar
- Go Gyeong-chun – keyboard
- Lee Sung-ryeol – guitar
- Park Cham – guitar
- Super D – keyboard
- Kim Kyu-won – pro-tools editing
- Goo Jongpil – mixing
- Nam Koong-jin – mixing
- Lee Seung-ho – mixing
- Jeon Hoon – mastering (mastering done at Sonic Korea)

== Awards ==
| Year | Organization | Category | Result | Ref. |
|---|---|---|---|---|
| 2011 | Hanteo Awards | Album Award | Won | |
| 2011 | Hanteo Awards | Singer Award (album-based) | Won | |
| 2011 | Hong Kong Top Sales Music Awards | Best Japanese & Korean Releases | Won | |
| 2011 | Mnet Asian Music Awards | Album of the Year | Won | |
| 2011 | Tower Records K-pop Lovers Awards | Album of the Year | Third place | |
| 2012 | Gaon Chart K-Pop Awards | Album of the Year – 3rd Quarter | Won | |
| 2012 | Golden Disc Awards | Album Daesang | Won | |
| 2012 | Golden Disc Awards | Album Bonsang | Won | |
| 2014 | Red Dot Design Awards | Communication Design Award | Won | |

== Release history ==
| Country | Date | Format | Distributing label |
|---|---|---|---|
| South Korea | 2 August 2011; 3 August 2011 (version A); 22 August 2011 (version B); 19 September 2011 (repackaged) | Digital download CD; CD; CD, digital download | KMP Holdings |
| Japan | 6 August 2011 | CD (import) | Avex Trax |
| Taiwan | 6 September 2011 (version A); 23 September 2011 (version B); 30 September 2011 (Repackaged) | CD | Avex Taiwan |
| Singapore | 29 September 2011 (version C) | CD | Universal Music |
| Philippines | 24 November 2011 (version A); 17 December 2011 (version B & C) | CD | Universal Records |
| Malaysia | 12 September 2011 (version B); 10 October 2011 (version C) | CD | Universal Music |

== See also ==
- Mr. Simple
  - Mr. Simple (Music Video) on YouTube
  - Mr. Simple (Teaser Movie 1) on YouTube
  - Mr. Simple (Teaser Movie 2) on YouTube
  - Mr. Simple (Making Film) on YouTube
- A-Cha
  - A-Cha (Music Video) on YouTube
  - A-Cha (Music Video – Dance Ver.1) on YouTube
  - A-Cha (Music Video – Dance Ver.2) on YouTube
  - A-Cha (Music Video Teaser) on YouTube
- Superman
  - Superman (Music Video) on YouTube
