= KMP Holdings =

South Korean music distribution company

KMP Holdings Co., Ltd.
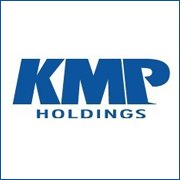
- Native name: 주식회사 KMP 홀딩스
- Company type: Private
- Industry: Music & Entertainment
- Genre: K-pop
- Founded: March 18, 2010; 16 years ago
- Defunct: November 2012
- Fate: Acquired by KT Music in 2012, then merged into it in 2013
- Successor: KT Music Corp.
- Headquarters: Cheongdam-dong, Gangnam District, Seoul, South Korea
- Area served: South Korea
- Key people: Kim Chang-whan (CEO)
- Products: Music & Entertainment
- Services: Music, Entertainment, Distributor
- Owner: 2010-2012: see list 2012: KT Music Corp.
- Website: kmpholdings.tistory.com

KMP Holdings (acronym for Korean Music Power; Korean: KMP홀딩스) was a South Korean music distribution company. It was headquartered in Gangnam-gu, Seoul and was opened on March 18, 2010.

== History ==
In March 2010, KMP Holdings was established via a joint venture between S.M., YG, JYP, Star Empire, and other companies like Media Line, CAN Entertainment and Music Factory Entertainment. KMP is the official distributor of releases from these companies (KMP stands for Korean Music Power). Its chief executive officer is songwriter-producer Kim Chang-whan, representative of Media Line.

KMP Holdings encompasses many fields including: music service, digital music distribution, and TV program production. It is a service platform that works to provide a more reasonable digital music system. Many believe this is held to challenge the duopoly on music distribution by Mnet Media and LOEN Entertainment.

KT Music, the music contents arm of KT Corporation, eventually acquired KMP in November 2012, and in mid-June 2013, it absorbed KMP's distribution network.

== Awards ==
On the 2nd Gaon Chart K-Pop Awards last February 2, 2013, KMP Holdings was awarded as the "Best Music Distribution Company (Offline Music)".

== Founding companies ==
- S.M. Entertainment
- YG Entertainment
- JYP Entertainment
- Star Empire Entertainment
- Media Line
- CAN Entertainment
- Music Factory Entertainment

== Business area ==
- Music Album Off-Line Distribution
- Digital Music Distribution (domestic, foreign)
- Investment for Music Contents
- Contents Producing & Management
- Concert & Awards
- New Media, Social Media Business
- Merchandising

== Former distribution network ==
=== Korean ===
- Afrodino World
- CAN Entertainment (formerly CAN&J Entertainment)
- Fair Music
- GM Contents Media (later merged into Core Contents Media)
- GraceJ
- iMBC (for Infinite Challenge releases)
- JYP Entertainment
- Media Line
- Music Factory Entertainment
- S.M. Entertainment
- Star Empire Entertainment (excluding Nine Muses, whose distribution rights were then handled by LOEN Entertainment)
- Trophy Entertainment (moved to LOEN Entertainment, then dissolved)
- YG Entertainment

=== Japanese ===
- Avex Group
- Johnny & Associates
