= Serendipity's Embrace =

2024 South Korean television series

- Promotional poster
- Hangul: 우연일까?
- Hanja: 偶然일까?
- Lit.: Is It Fate?
- RR: Uyeonilkka?
- MR: Uyŏnilkka?
- Genre: Romantic comedy
- Based on: Is It Fate? by: Nam Ji-eun; Kim In-ho
- Developed by: Studio Dragon
- Written by: Park Geu-ro
- Directed by: Song Hyun-wook
- Starring: Kim So-hyun; Chae Jong-hyeop; Yoon Ji-on; Kim Da-som
- Country of origin: South Korea
- Original language: Korean
- No. of episodes: 8

Production
- Production company: Base Story

Original release
- Network: tvN
- Release: July 22 – August 13, 2024

Serendipity's Embrace (Korean: 우연일까?) is a 2024 South Korean television series written by Park Geu-ro, directed by Song Hyun-wook, and starring Kim So-hyun, Chae Jong-hyeop, Yoon Ji-on, and Kim Da-som. It is based on Naver webtoon of the same name by writer Nam Ji-eun and illustrated by Kim In-ho, which was published in 2011. It aired on tvN from July 22, 2024 till August 13, 2024 every Monday and Tuesday at 20:40 (KST). It is available for streaming on TVING in South Korea, Disney+ in Japan, and on Viki and Viu in selected regions.

== Synopsis ==
The story of young people who meet their first love after 10 years by chance and go on to find true love and dreams.

== Cast and characters ==
=== Main ===
- Kim So-hyun as Lee Hong-joo

An animation production producer who is afraid of love due to a wound from her past love.

- Chae Jong-hyeop as Kang Hoo-yeong

A financial planner whose heart began to fluctuate again after reuniting with his first love after 10 years.

- Yoon Ji-on as Bang Jun-ho

A popular writer full of narcissism who was Hong-joo's first love, she was his number 1 fan. They met while publishing his first novel.

- Kim Da-som as Kim Hye-ji

An English teacher at Ohbok High School and Lee Hong-joo's best friend.

=== Supporting ===
- Lee Won-jung as Kwon Sang Pil

Hoo-yeong's high school close friend. He later becomes close friends with Lee Hong-joo and Kim Hye-ji. He runs a restaurant where Hong-joo and Hye-ji are regular customers.

- Hwang Seong-bin as Gyeong-taek

A physical education teacher at Ohbok High School who has had a crush on Kim Hye-ji for a long time.

- Yoon Jun-won as Joseph Oh

Hoo-yeong's close friend and important client, who comes from a wealthy family and immigrated to the United States. He graduated from law school and has excellent English skills.

== Production ==
=== Development ===
The series is based on the 2011 webtoon Is It Fate? written by Nam Ji-eun and illustrated by Kim In-ho. This representative romance webtoon that marked the beginning of Naver's webtoon popularity. It is directed by Song Hyun-wook, who directed other works such as Another Miss Oh (2016), Revolutionary Love (2017), The Beauty Inside (2018) and The King's Affection (2021) among others and penned by Park Geu-ro. South Korean online news Xports News, reported that the drama is being discussed to release on tvN.

=== Casting ===
On August 8, 2022, it was reported that Kim So-hyun was in talks to star in the series for her next work since her drama River Where the Moon Rises ended in 2021. She then confirmed for the role in November 2022. On October 6, it was reported that Chae Jong-hyeop had received an offer for the role of the male protagonist in the drama, and was later confirmed for it. Yoon Ji-on's respective agency announced that he would also star in the show.

=== Filming ===
Principal photography began in the second half of 2022.

== Release ==
tvN confirmed that the series would be broadcast on July 22, 2024, every Monday and Tuesday at 20:40 (KST). It is also available to stream on OTT platforms such as TVING, Viki, and Viu.

== Viewership ==
Serendipity's Embrace : South Korea viewers per episode (thousands)

Season	Episode number								Average
Season	1	2	3	4	5	6	7	8	Average
1	862	738	582	606	606	656	658	719	678

Source: Audience measurement performed nationwide by Nielsen Korea.

Average TV viewership ratings
Ep.	Original broadcast date	Average audience share (Nielsen Korea)	
Ep.	Original broadcast date	Nationwide	Seoul
1	July 22, 2024	3.877% (1st)	4.752% (1st)
2	July 23, 2024	3.338% (1st)	4.029% (1st)
3	July 29, 2024	2.679% (1st)	2.848% (1st)
4	July 30, 2024	2.661% (1st)	3.007% (1st)
5	August 5, 2024	2.694% (1st)	3.047% (1st)
6	August 6, 2024	2.988% (1st)	3.537% (1st)
7	August 12, 2024	3.068% (1st)	3.315% (1st)
8	August 13, 2024	3.096% (1st)	3.097% (1st)
Average		3.050%	3.454%
In the table above, the blue numbers represent the lowest ratings and the red numbers represent the highest ratings.; This drama airs on a cable channel/pay TV which normally has a relatively smaller audience compared to free-to-air TV/public broadcasters (KBS, SBS, MBC, and EBS).
