= Choi Si-won =

South Korean singer and actor (born 1986)

- 최시원
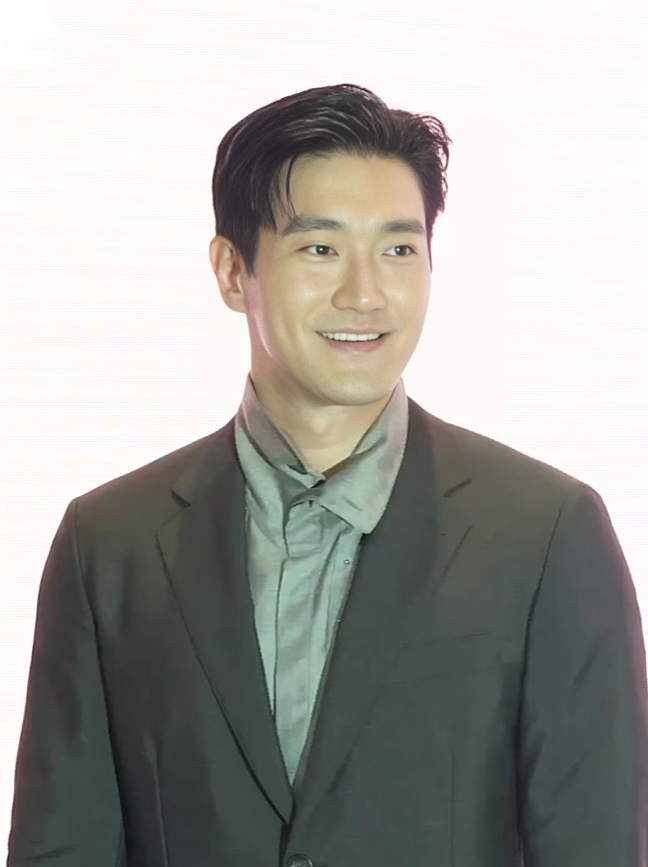
- Choi in 2024
- Born: April 7, 1986 (age 40) (Note: Choi Si-won was born on April 7, 1986, while his registered birth date is February 10, 1987.); Seoul, South Korea
- Education: Inha University
- Occupations: Singer; songwriter; actor; model; ambassador
- Musical career
- Genre: K-pop
- Instrument: Vocals
- Years active: 2005–present
- Labels: SM; Label SJ
- Member of: Super Junior; Super Junior-M; Super Junior-L.S.S.; SM Town
- Website: Official website

Korean name
- Hangul: 최시원
- Hanja: 崔始源
- RR: Choe Siwon
- MR: Ch'oe Siwŏn

Signature
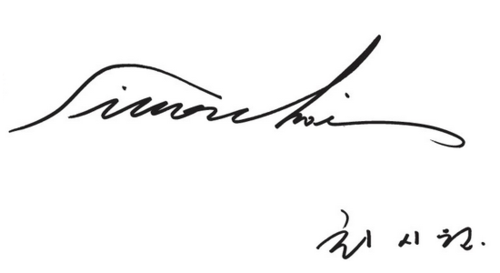

Choi Si-won (Korean: 최시원; born April 7, 1986), known mononymously as Siwon, is a South Korean singer, songwriter, model, and actor, known for his work as a member of South Korean boy group Super Junior. Choi was a special representative for UNICEF Korea from 2015 to 2019, before being chosen as a UNICEF East Asia and Pacific Regional Office ambassador in November 2019.

Aside from being a member of Super Junior, Choi has also ventured into solo activities, mainly acting. He played lead roles in the Korean dramas Oh! My Lady (2010), Poseidon (2011), Revolutionary Love (2017), My Fellow Citizens! (2019), and Love Is for Suckers (2022) and had supporting roles in Athena: Goddess of War (2010), The King of Dramas (2012), She Was Pretty (2015), and Bloodhounds (2023). Choi has also participated in various Chinese language films such as Helios, To the Fore, and Dragon Blade.

== Early life ==
Choi was born in Seoul, South Korea, on April 7, 1986. He has one younger sister, Ji-won. His father was the former CEO of Boryung Medicine, a pharmaceutical company. Choi graduated from Apgu Jeong High School in February 2006 and from Inha University in February 2012 alongside fellow member Kim Ryeowook.

== Career ==
Choi was scouted by a talent agent from SM Entertainment when he was 16 as he was waiting for friends in front of his high school. The agent recommended him to audition for the company's Starlight Casting System. He auditioned without his parents' approval; his parents were notified only after he passed the auditions. Although his parents allowed him to sign a contract with SM Entertainment, they did not give him any help because they wanted him to take responsibility for his actions.

He later moved into dormitories with fellow trainees and was trained in areas of singing, acting, dancing as well as languages. He was featured in a music video of The Grace's Dana whilst he was being trained as a solo singer in 2003. A year after, Choi made a brief appearance in family drama Precious Family, and again in 2005 in the KBS romance comedy drama Eighteen, Twenty-Nine as young Kang Bong-man, while in 2006 he played the supporting role of Park Sang-woo in romance melodrama Spring Waltz.

=== Debut with Super Junior and Super Junior-M ===
Not long after Choi's first television appearance, SM Entertainment released an announcement that he would debut as one of the twelve members in a boy band. A few months before the debut of Super Junior 05, Choi made his first media appearance with bandmate Han Geng as one of the runway models in a fashion show by Bum Suk.

Choi debuted as part of 12-member rotational project group Super Junior 05 on November 6, 2005, on SBS' music program Popular Songs, performing their first single, "Twins (Knock Out)". Their debut album Twins was released a month later on December 5, 2005, and debuted at number three on the monthly MIAK K-pop album charts.

In March 2006, SM Entertainment began to recruit new members for the next Super Junior generation. However, plans changed and the company declared a halt in forming future Super Junior generations. Following the addition of thirteenth member Kyuhyun, the group dropped the suffix "05" and became officially credited as Super Junior. The re-polished group's first CD single "U" was released on June 7, 2006, which was their most successful single until the release of "Sorry, Sorry" in March 2009, which helped them achieve global success.

In April 2008, Choi was put into seven-member sub-group Super Junior-M, a Mandopop subgroup of Super Junior for the Chinese music industry. They debuted in China at the 8th Annual Music Chart Awards, simultaneously with the release of their first music video, "U" on April 8, 2008. This was followed by the release of the debut Chinese-language studio album, Me in selected provinces in China on April 23 and May 2 in Taiwan.

On July 5, 2023, Super Junior-L.S.S., a sub-unit group consisting of Super Junior bandmates Choi, Leeteuk, and Shindong, debuted with their first Japanese single "シャッタ閉めろ／Shatta Shimero". The trio later made their official Korean debut on January 22, 2024 with the single "Suit Up".

=== Solo ventures ===
In 2006, Choi was cast in the Hong Kong epic film A Battle of Wits, playing the role of the Liang Prince. This also marks his film debut. Choi received praise from co-star Andy Lau, who stated that Choi sets a good example for Hong Kong actors.

In 2007, Choi starred in Attack on the Pin-Up Boys along with other Super Junior members. The same year, he was cast in MBC's two-episode mini series Legend of Hyang Dan.

After a three-year hiatus, Choi returned to the screen with SBS' romantic comedy Oh! My Lady. The same year, he starred in the big-budget spy series Athena: Goddess of War, a spin-off to the 2009 hit drama Iris. He plays a data analyst and rookie elite agent.

In 2011, Choi headlined KBS' action drama Poseidon. The same year, he starred in his first Taiwanese drama Skip Beat! with Ivy Chen and fellow band member Donghae. The series is a live-action adaptation of Japanese shōjo manga titled Skip Beat! by Yoshiki Nakamura.

In 2012, Choi starred in SBS' comedy satire drama The King of Dramas, based around Korean television production. He plays Kang Hyun-min, a top celebrity with a prickly personality.

Choi starred in multiple projects in 2015. He co-starred in Hong Kong historical-action film Dragon Blade with Jackie Chan, crime thriller Helios and sports drama To the Fore alongside Eddie Peng and Shawn Dou. He also starred in the Chinese romance drama Fall In Love With You Again and was cast in Billion Dollar Heir, a Chinese adaptation of the 2013 hit drama The Heirs. Back in Korea, Choi starred as the second male lead in MBC's romantic comedy She Was Pretty. He received critical acclaim for his acting performance and comedic portrayal of the character, and experienced a rise in popularity. He released a single for the drama titled "Only You", which ranked atop the music charts. In 2015, Choi Siwon with EnterMedia Pictures (CEO Lee Dong Hoon) purchased the rights to the 2011 Daum webtoon Interview, authored by Rude Vico.

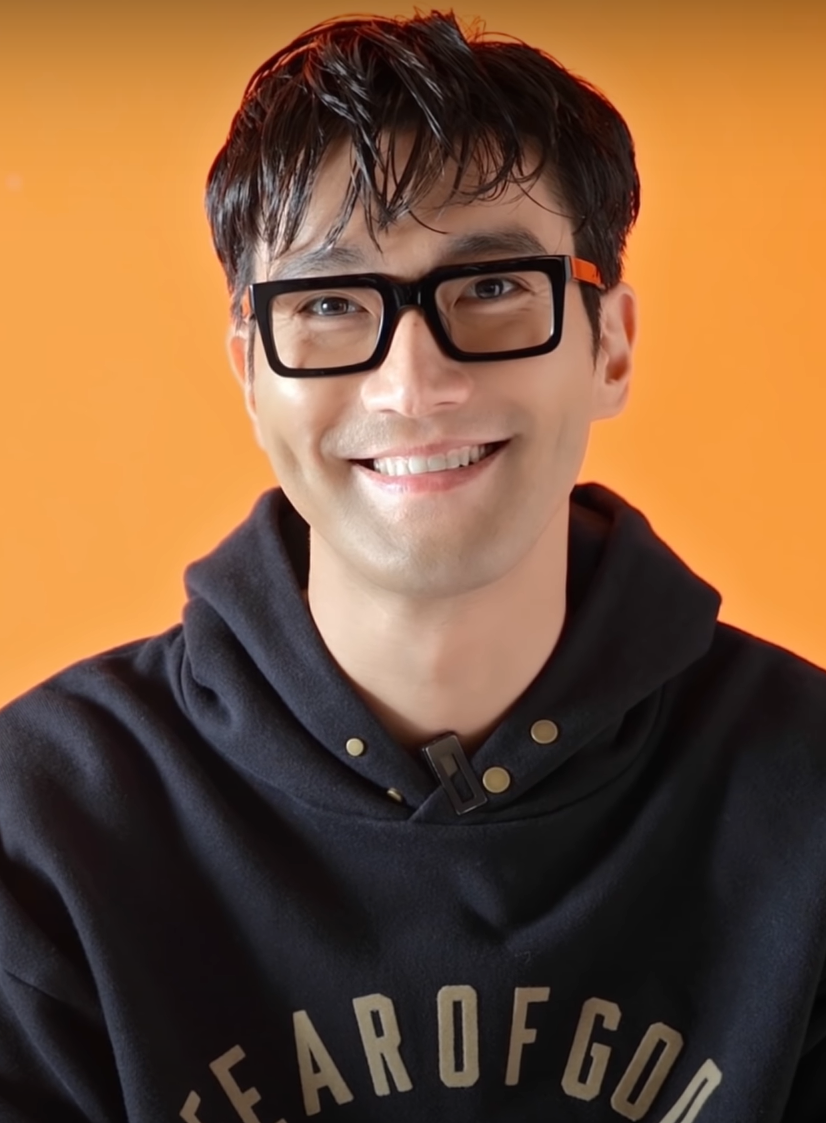
Choi in 2021

In October 2017, Choi starred in the tvN's youth romance drama Revolutionary Love alongside Kang So-ra. This marked his first project after releasing from his mandatory military enlistment on August 18, 2017.

In April 2019, Choi starred in KBS's crime comedy drama My Fellow Citizens!. In 2020, he starred in an episode of the science fiction anthology series SF8.

In 2021, Choi starred in the TVING web series Work Later, Drink Now and made a cameo appearance in the movie New Year Blues. In addition to his appearance, he also released the track "Nobody but You" as part of the Work Later, Drink Now soundtrack. In 2022, Choi starred in the ENA romantic comedy series Love Is for Suckers and returned for the second season of Work Later, Drink Now.

In 2023, Choi played a supporting role in the Netflix original series Bloodhounds, and made a cameo in the TVING original series Death's Game. In 2024, he starred in the TV Chosun romantic comedy series DNA Lover.

== Other ventures ==
=== Endorsements ===
Choi Si-won is a representative for Audi Korea. In 2015, Choi Si-won was chosen by the Swiss luxury watchmaker brand Piaget as their youngest Asian model.

=== Philanthropy ===
Choi has joined many UNICEF campaigns since 2010. He was appointed as the special representative of the South Korea committee for UNICEF on November 12, 2015.

Upon his release from the military, Choi confirmed to volunteer for a UNICEF campaign in Vietnam from August 21 to 25, 2017, alongside fellow labelmate Jaemin of NCT Dream. The campaign is named as "SMile for U" which is a music education programme for children with disabilities conducted in partnership with Choi's agency.

=== Ambassadorship ===
In 2023, Choi was named the public relations ambassador of the 14th Gwangju Biennale.

== Impact and influence ==
In 2008, Choi and his fellow Super Junior-M members appeared on Chinese postage stamps, becoming the first South Korean artists to do so. The stamps were sold at a charity event to raise funds for victims of an earthquake which happened in China earlier that year.

In 2013, Choi, along with Psy, became the first K-pop stars to attend the Met Gala. In October 2015, he became the first Korean to reach 5 million Twitter followers. In 2016, Choi was listed in Forbes magazine's "30 Under 30 Asia." He was described as "one of South Korea's most sought-after singers and actors."

A wax figure of Choi was unveiled at Madame Tussauds in Hong Kong on November 19, 2015.

== Personal life ==
=== Beliefs ===
Choi is a devout Protestant Christian, and has said he would like to become a missionary. He frequently posts Bible quotes on his Twitter and Weibo accounts. He has also collaborated with the Christian singing group 3rd Wave Music along with other K-pop artists.

=== Military service ===
Choi enlisted as a conscripted policeman on November 19, 2015. He was discharged from mandatory military service on August 18, 2017.

== Controversies ==
=== Anti-LGBT ===
In 2007, when being asked about male actors portraying sexually ambiguous roles as in The King and the Clown (2005), Choi said: "I will respectfully refuse any such offers. While I respect all genders, I do not wish to acknowledge homosexuals as I have been taught that God created Man and Woman with specific characteristics and duties. I realize that with globalization, there are many [entertainers] who do not share my views. There are those who are value-oriented and those who are success-oriented. However shouldn't an actor deliver an image to his audience through roles he chooses to portray, based on his beliefs in life?"

On September 11, 2015, Choi retweeted theologian John Piper who stated "Obergefell is not constitutional; so-called same-sex marriage does not exist." Choi also shared Piper's link to an article in support of Kim Davis, as well as two Biblical passages, confirming he remained against gay marriage. The next day he removed the retweets and posted an apology in both Korean and English. The English version went, "I apologize for my inconsiderate choice to retweet Rev. Piper's tweet. Reason I echoed Rev. Piper's thoughts was because I wished to voice a plurality of opinions. However, now I realize that my comments were hurtful to those whom I hold dearest: my fans, and their friends and families. I am truly sorry. My judgment was insensitive, thoughtless, and ill-conceived. I will do my best to learn from my mistakes and reflect on my faith. I thank everyone for their support and understanding." He later deleted the apology.

In April 2023, Choi has been accused of transphobia over a meme he posted on Bubble, a private online discussion platform. The controversial meme shows a scene from the movie Titanic (1997) in which actor Billy Zane's character Caledon Hockley is trying to be rescued but is told "women and children first." Zane's character then claims: "I'm trans." Choi wrote "It's funny kekekekeke" along with the image.

=== Deadly dog bite ===
On September 30, 2017, an untied French bulldog owned by Choi's family bit their neighbor, 53-year-old businesswoman Kim who ran Hanilkwan, an upscale Korean cuisine restaurant. This resulted in the death of the victim six days after the incident. The cause was identified as sepsis, brought on by the bite. Choi and his father separately wrote letters of apology on their Instagram accounts on October 21, 2017. Although a family member of the deceased told media that the family were not willing to take any legal action, the Choi family received severe backlash from the public for not taking any precautionary measures with their dog.

=== Tribute to Charlie Kirk ===
On September 11, 2025, following the death of U.S. political influencer and Trump ally Charlie Kirk, Choi posted an image on Instagram with the caption "REST IN PEACE CHARLIE KIRK, Charlie Kirk, rest in peace." The photo featured Kirk's face alongside a cross illustration and was set to the song "Rescue" by American CCM artist Lauren Daigle. Choi also shared a second photo of Kirk with his family, accompanied by the Bible verse "Well done, good and faithful servant." Both posts were deleted after drawing criticism from K-pop fans, most of whom cited Kirk's far-right positions, including his support for gun rights, opposition to abortion, and remarks described as racist and anti-LGBT.

On September 12, 2025, Choi addressed the controversy on the fan platform Bubble. He wrote that there had been "much discussion" about his post and that he wished to explain his intentions. He described Kirk as "a Christian, a father, and a husband." He added that "regardless of the circumstances, the fact that he lost his life in a shooting while giving a lecture in front of countless college students is a heartbreaking tragedy beyond any political stance. That is why I paid tribute to him." Choi said he deleted the posts after feeling that his "intentions were misunderstood." He explained that he believed his "sincere feelings had already been conveyed".

=== Posts following Yoon Suk-yeol's verdict ===
On 19 February 2026, following the Seoul Central District Court’s announcement sentencing former South Korean president Yoon Suk-yeol to life imprisonment for attempted insurrection, Choi posted the Chinese phrase “不可思議” (lit. 'Incredible') on Instagram before deleting it and posting "不義必亡，土崩瓦解" (lit. 'Injustice will surely perish; collapse like crumbling earth and shattered tiles' ). The posts were widely interpreted as criticizing the verdict and expressing support for Yoon. Amid the backlash, SM Entertainment issued a statement saying that it had identified malicious posts targeting Choi and had initiated legal action to protect him.

== Discography ==
=== Singles ===
Title	Year	Album	Ref.
"Worthless"	2010	Oh! My Lady OST	
"Helios Theme Song" (赤色壮举) (with Jacky Cheung)	2015	Helios (film) OST	
"You're the Only One"	2015	She Was Pretty OST	
"Nobody but You"	2021	Work Later, Drink Now OST Part 5	
"My Old Bike (Riding)" (feat. UV (Yoo Se-yoon, Musi))	2022	Non-album single	
"I Want Love" (사랑을 원해) (with Lee Da-hee)	2022	Love Is for Suckers OST Part 3	

=== Composition credits ===
All song credits are adapted from the Korea Music Copyright Association's database unless stated otherwise.

List of songs, showing year released, artist name, name of the album, and credited roles
Year	Title	Artist	Album	Composer	Lyricist
2014	"Don't Leave Me"	Super Junior	Mamacita	Yes	Yes
2017	"On and On"	Super Junior	Star	Yes	Yes
2021	"Nobody but You"	Choi Si-won	Work Later, Drink Now OST Part 5	Yes	No

== Filmography ==
=== Film ===
Year	Title	Role	Notes	Ref.
2006	A Battle of Wits	Prince Liang Shi	China–Hong Kong film	
2007	Attack on the Pin-Up Boys	Student Body President		
2012	I AM.	Himself	Documentary	
2015	Dragon Blade	Yinpo	China–Hong Kong film	
2015	Helios	Park Woo-cheol	China–Hong Kong film	
2015	To the Fore	Zheng Ji-won	China–Hong Kong film	
2021	New Year Blues	Jin Ah's ex-boyfriend	Cameo	
2025	Forbidden Fairytale	Jeong-seok		
2025	Lobby	Ma Tae-soo		

=== Television series ===
Year	Title	Role	Notes	Ref.
2004	Precious Family	—N/a	Cameo	
2005	Eighteen, Twenty-Nine	Kang Bong-man (younger)		
2006	Spring Waltz	Park Sang-woo		
2007	Legend of Hyang-dan	Lee Mong-ryong		
2009	Stage of Youth	Shi Yuan	Cameo	
2010	Oh! My Lady	Sung Min-woo		
2010–2011	Athena: Goddess of War	Kim Jun-ho		
2011	Poseidon	Kim Sun-woo		
2011–2012	Skip Beat!	Dun He Lian		
2012	The King of Dramas	Kang Hyun-min		
2015	Fall In Love With You Again	Song Chen Yi	Chinese drama	
2015	The Man in the Mask	Thief	Cameo (Episode 1)	
2015	She Was Pretty	Kim Shin-hyuk	Chief Editor and Author Ten	
2017	Revolutionary Love	Byun Hyuk		
2019	My Fellow Citizens!	Yang Jung-kook		
2020	SF8	Choi Min-joon	Episode: "Love Virtually"	
2022	Love Is for Suckers	Park Jae-hoon		
2024	DNA Lover	Shim Yeon-woo		
TBA	Billion Dollar Heir	Yue Xi Wang		

=== Web series ===
Year	Title	Role	Notes	Ref.
2016	Dramaworld	Himself	Cameo	
2021–2022	Work Later, Drink Now	Kang Book-goo	Season 1–2	
2023	Bloodhounds	Hong Min-beom		
2023–2024	Death's Game	Park Jin-tae	Cameo, episodes 1, 5	

=== Television shows ===
Year	Title	Role	Notes	Ref.
2007	Secret Reports Super Summer	Cast Member		
2015	Infinite Challenge	Cast Member	6th Man	
2015	We Are In Love	Cast Member	with Liu Wen	
2020	Yacht Expedition	Cast Member		
2021	Kwak's LP Bar	DJ, Host		
2021–present	My Little Old Boy	Special members	Episode 269–present	

=== Music video ===
Year	Title	Artist	Ref.
2006	"Timeless"	Zhang Liyin	

== Accolades ==
=== Awards and nominations ===
Name of the award ceremony, year presented, category, nominee of the award, and the result of the nomination
Award ceremony	Year	Category	Nominee / Work	Result	Ref.
Asia Artist Awards	2019	Best Icon Award in Television	My Fellow Citizens!	Won	
Asia Artist Awards	2022	New Wave Award (Actor)	Love Is for Suckers	Won	
Asia Artist Awards	2022	Best Acting Performance	Love Is for Suckers	Won	
Drama Fever Awards	2016	Best Supporting Actor	She Was Pretty	Won	
Indonesian Television Awards	2020	Most Prominent Korean Artist	Choi Si-won	Won	
KBS Drama Awards	2011	Netizen Award, Actor	Poseidon	Nominated	
KBS Drama Awards	2019	Excellence Award, Actor in a Mid-length Drama	My Fellow Citizens!	Won	
KBS Drama Awards	2019	Netizen Award, Actor	My Fellow Citizens!	Nominated	
KBS Drama Awards	2019	Best Couple Award	Choi Si-won with Lee Yoo-young; My Fellow Citizens!	Nominated	
MBC Drama Awards	2015	Excellence Award, Actor in a Miniseries	She Was Pretty	Nominated	
MBC Drama Awards	2015	Popularity Award, Actor	She Was Pretty	Nominated	
Mnet 20's Choice Awards	2012	20s Social Artist	Choi Si-won	Nominated	
SBS Drama Awards	2010	New Star Award	Oh! My Lady	Won	

=== State and cultural honors ===
Name of country or organization, name of award ceremony, year given, and name of honor
Country or organization	Ceremony	Year	Honor	Ref.
South Korea	Korean Youth Hope Awards	2023	National Assembly Foreign Affairs and Unification Committee's Commendation	
