= Bang Eun-hee =

South Korean actress (born 1967)

- Bang in 2013
- Born: Bang Min-seo; May 7, 1967 (age 59); South Korea
- Education: Seoul Institute of the Arts - Theater Studies
- Occupation: Actress
- Years active: 1988–present
- Agent: NH Media
- Spouse(s): Sung Wan-kyung (m. 2000; div. 2003) Kim Nam-hee (m. 2010)

Korean name
- Hangul: 방은희
- Hanja: 方銀姬
- RR: Bang Eunhui
- MR: Pang Ŭnhŭi

Former name
- Hangul: 방민서
- RR: Bang Minseo
- MR: Pang Minsŏ

Bang Eun-hee (Korean: 방은희; born Bang Min-seo on May 7, 1967) is a South Korean actress. Bang made her acting debut in 1988, and rose to fame after being cast as the lead actress in Im Kwon-taek's General's Son (1990). She has starred in films and television dramas such as The Day a Pig Fell into the Well (1996), No. 3 (1997), 3PM Paradise Bath House (1997), Shadows of an Old Love (1998), Legend of Hyang Dan (2007), Daebak Life (2008), and All My Love (2010).

Bang married Kim Nam-hee, founder and CEO of NH Media, on September 9, 2010. As of 2016, she is now represented by the agency.

== Filmography ==
=== Film ===
Year	Title	Role
1988	Love's Scribble	Female student
1988	Wasteland	Soo-jin
1989	Mouse Landing Operation	Professor Hwang
1990	Watercolor Painting in a Rainy Day	Kyung-ae
1990	General's Son	Hwa-ja
1991	Portrait of the Days of Youth	(cameo)
1991	Silver Stallion	Soon-deok
1991	1991 Human Market 3	Female secretary
1991	Do You Like Afternoons After the Rain?	Jung-ah
1991	From Barefoot to Bentz	Eun-young
1992	The Moon Is... the Sun's Dream	Soo-mi
1992	Twenty Seven Roses	Miss Song
1992	Marriage Story	Mi-young
1994	Horror Express (V)	13인의 피
1994	The Fox with Nine Tails	Min-yi
1994	Young Lover	Female teacher 1
1994	Pirate	Do-hee
1995	Mom Has a New Boyfriend	Ji-young
1995	Rehearsal	Shin-woo
1996	The Day a Pig Fell into the Well	In-chang's wife
1997	Poison	"Leather Pants" girl
1997	No. 3	Ji-na
1997	3PM Paradise Bath House	Hwang Jung-mi
2001	Love Her	Mrs. Jang
2007	Before the Summer Passes Away	Sang-jung (cameo)
2008	Life Is Beautiful	Woman in restaurant
2008	Viva! Love	Hairdresser in salon
2010	C+ (short film)	
2015	Untouchable Lawman	Eun-hee (special appearance)
2016	Our Dating History	Kim I-kyung
2017	The Poet and the Boy	Se-yun's mother

=== Television series ===
Year	Title	Role
1992	Tragic Grass	
1993	Walking All the Way to Heaven	Miss Oh
1993	Our Family of Fifteen	
1996	Wealthy Yu-chun	Jo Tae-soon
1996	Wonji-dong Blues	
1996	MBC Best Theater: "Between Her and My Wife"	Young-hee
1997	Passionate Love	
1997	MBC Best Theater: "Things You Can Regret"	Jae-hee
1998	Because I Love You, I'm Sorry	
1998	Shadows of an Old Love	Seon-joo
1998	The Solid Man	Jo Mi-ryung
1999	KBS TV Novel: "Bird"	
2000	MBC Best Theater: "Ji Hwa-ja and Ha Soo-min"	Ji Hwa-ja
2001	Soon-ja	Kang In-ok
2002	Open Drama Man and Woman	Young-ja
2003	Are You Still Dreaming	Cha Mi-kyung
2004	More Beautiful Than a Flower	Kim Jae-geon's mother
2004	Precious Family	Myung-sook
2004	MBC Best Theater: "Thunder of Money"	
2004	Drama City: "Massage"	Skin care owner
2005	Rebirth - Next	
2005	Don't Worry	Han Yoo-jung
2005	Golden Apple	Keum-shil's mother
2006	Let's Love Again	Oh Hee-ah
2006	The Vineyard Man	Seo Young-ran
2006	HDTV Literature: "Bad Story"	Jae-seon's mother
2007	MBC Best Theater: "Flanks and Thighs"	Female neighbor
2007	Moon Hee	Kim Mu-seol
2007	Legend of Hyang Dan	Wol-mae
2007	Winter Bird	Woman from Incheon
2007	Cruel Love	Park Chan-sook
2008	Daebak Life	Na Young-ja
2008	Life Special Investigation Team	President Yang's wife (guest, episode 1)
2008	Returned Earthen Bowl	Go Seon-hee
2008	Love Marriage	
2008	General Hospital 2	Hwang Eun-hee (guest, episodes 9–10)
2008	Mrs. Saigon	
2009	The Slingshot	Myung-sun
2009	Children of Heaven	
2009	Tamra, the Island	Go Ba-soon
2009	Hometown Legends: "The Wooden Doll"	Eon-nyeo
2009	Loving You a Thousand Times	Yoon So-wol
2010	Master of Study	Han Ae-shim
2010	Life Is Beautiful	Jo Nam-shik
2010	All My Love for You	Bang Eun-hee
2011	Drama Special: "Crossing the Yeongdo Bridge"	Oh Kyung-ok
2011	Bride of the Sun	Im Mi-sun
2012	High Kick: Revenge of the Short Legged	Kang Seung-yoon's mother (guest, episode 77)
2012	Dr. Jin	Sik-yi's mother (guest, episode 3)
2012	My Kids Give Me a Headache	Divorce suit client (cameo)
2013	Ad Genius Lee Tae-baek	Won Mi-ok
2013	Can't Stand Anymore	Yoo Jung-sook
2013	The Suspicious Housekeeper	Oh Eo-jin's mother
2013	Drama Special: "My Dad Is a Nude Model"	Mi-ra
2014	A Witch's Love	Oh Mi-yeon
2014	Pluto Secret Society	Insurance sales representative
2014	Naeil's Cantabile	Seol Nae-il's mother
2015	House of Bluebird	Park Haeng-sook
2015	A Girl Who Sees Smells	Yang Mi-yeon
2015	High Society	Kim Seo-ra
2016	Beautiful Gong Shim	Cheon Ji-yeon
2016	Second to Last Love	
2016	I'm Sorry, But I Love You	Home shopping model (cameo)
2017	Missing 9	Bong-hee's mother
2017	Unknown Woman	Jang Ae-nok
2017	Reunited Worlds	Yoon Mi-na
2018	My Contracted Husband, Mr. Oh	Bae Yi-bi
2018	Gangnam Scandal	Hong Baek-hee
2020	Money Game	Lee Man-ok
2022	The Secret House	Yoo Gwang-mi

=== Radio program ===
Year	Title	Notes
1991	Entertainment Walk	DJ
1996	Sunday Express with Byun Jin-sup and Bang Eun-hee	DJ
	Radio Date with Ji Suk-jin and Bang Eun-hee	DJ

== Theater ==
Year	Title	Role
1988	Use a Chicken Instead of a Pheasant	
2007	A Day	Bureau chief Jang/Drama PD
2011	Who Needs Men?	Marjorie

== Awards and nominations ==
Year	Award	Category	Nominated work	Result
1991	12th Blue Dragon Film Awards	Best Supporting Actress	Silver Stallion	Nominated
1992	13th Blue Dragon Film Awards	Best Supporting Actress	From Barefoot To Benz	Nominated
1993	31st Grand Bell Awards	Best Supporting Actress	Marriage Story	Nominated
1994	15th Blue Dragon Film Awards	Best Supporting Actress	The Fox with Nine Tails	Nominated
1997	18th Blue Dragon Film Awards	Best Supporting Actress	No. 3	Nominated
2006	KBS Drama Awards	Best Actress in a One-Act/Special/Short Drama	Bad Story	Nominated
