= Song Hyun-wook =

South Korean film director

- Other names: Song Hyeon-wook
- Occupations: Scriptwriter, Film director
- Years active: 2008–present
- Employer: Studio Bom

Korean name
- Hangul: 송현욱
- Hanja: 宋賢旭
- RR: Song Hyeonuk
- MR: Song Hyŏnuk

Song Hyun-wook (Korean: 송현욱) is a South Korean television director. His debut TV drama was The Splendor of Youth in 2008. He is best known for his direction in TV series: Another Miss Oh (2016), Revolutionary Love (2017), The Beauty Inside (2018) and The King's Affection (2021) among others.

In 2022, Song founded his own production company, Studio Bom.

== Filmography ==
| Year | English title | Korean title | Notes | Ref(s) |
|---|---|---|---|---|
| 2008 | The Splendor of Youth | 청춘예찬 | Co-director | |
| 2009 | Hot Blood | 열혈 장사꾼 | Co-director | |
| 2010 | Legend of the Patriots | 전우 | Co-director | |
| 2011 | Drama Special – "Princess Hwapyung's Weight Loss" | 화평공주 체중감량사 | Season 2, Epi. 4 | |
| 2011 | Drama Special – "Our Happy Days of Youth | 기쁜 우리 젊은 날 | Season 2, Epi. 12 | |
| 2011 | Drama Special – "Ji-hoon, Born in 1982" | 82년생 지훈이 | Season 2, Epi. 18 | |
| 2011 | Brain | 브레인 | Co-director | |
| 2012 | Drama Special – "The Disappearance of the Member of Parliament" | 드라마 스페셜 - 국회의원 정치성 실종사건 | | |
| 2012 | Lovers of Haeundae | 해운대 연인들 | Co-director | |
| 2013 | Drama Special – "The Mother's Island" | 엄마의 섬 | Season 4, Epi. 7 | |
| 2014 | Marriage, Not Dating | 연애 말고 결혼 | Co-director | |
| 2015 | Super Daddy Yeol | 슈퍼대디 열 | Co-director | |
| 2015 | Seol-ryeon's Story | 설련화 | | |
| 2016 | Another Miss Oh | 또! 오해영 | | |
| 2017 | Introverted Boss | 내성적인 보스 | | |
| 2017 | Revolutionary Love | 변혁의 사랑 | | |
| 2017 | Meloholic | 멜로홀릭 | | |
| 2018 | The Beauty Inside | 뷰티 인사이드 | | |
| 2020 | Graceful Friends | 우아한 친구들 | | |
| 2021 | Undercover | 언더커버 | | |
| 2021 | The King's Affection | 연모 | | |
| 2022 | The Golden Spoon | 금수저 | | |
| 2024 | The Midnight Studio | 야한 사진관 | | |
| 2024 | Serendipity's Embrace | 우연일까? | | |
| 2025 | Walking On Thin Ice | 은수 좋은 날 | | |
| 2025 | Would You Merry Me? | 우주메리미 | | |
