= Lee Da-hee =

South Korean actress and model (born 1985)

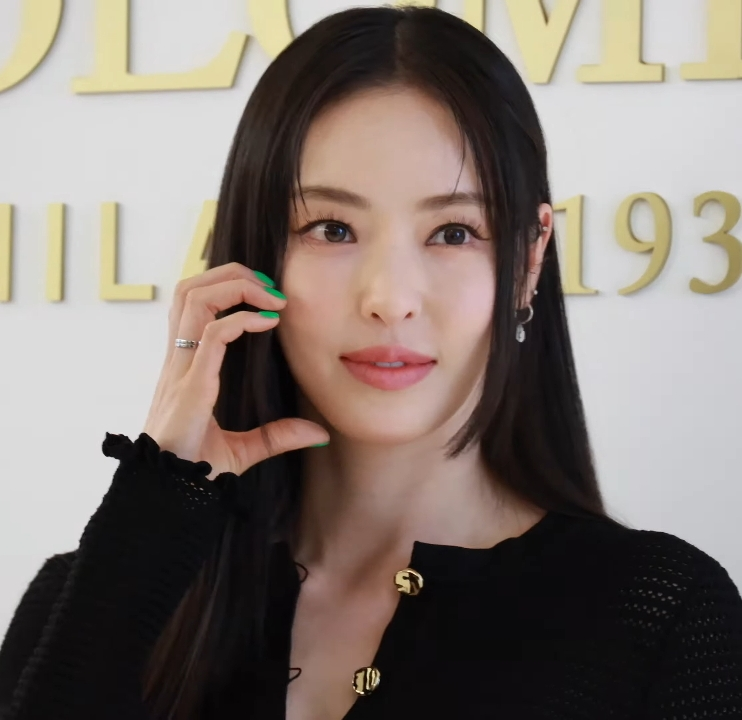
- Lee in April 2024
- Born: March 15, 1985 (age 41); Yongin, South Korea
- Occupations: Actress; model
- Years active: 2002–present
- Agent: Ghost Studio
- Height: 1.76 m (5 ft 9 in)

Korean name
- Hangul: 이다희
- RR: I Dahui
- MR: I Tahŭi

Lee Da-hee (Korean: 이다희; born March 15, 1985) is a South Korean model and actress. Her breakout role was in the 2013 SBS courtroom drama I Can Hear Your Voice. She is also known for her role as Kang Sa-ra in The Beauty Inside (2018) and Cha Hyeon in Search: WWW (2019).

== Career ==
At the age of 17, Lee Da-hee competed in the 2002 SBS Super Elite Model Contest, where she was a finalist. She began her acting career by playing supporting roles in television dramas, including The Legend, Birdie Buddy, and Secret Love, and in films, including Harmony.

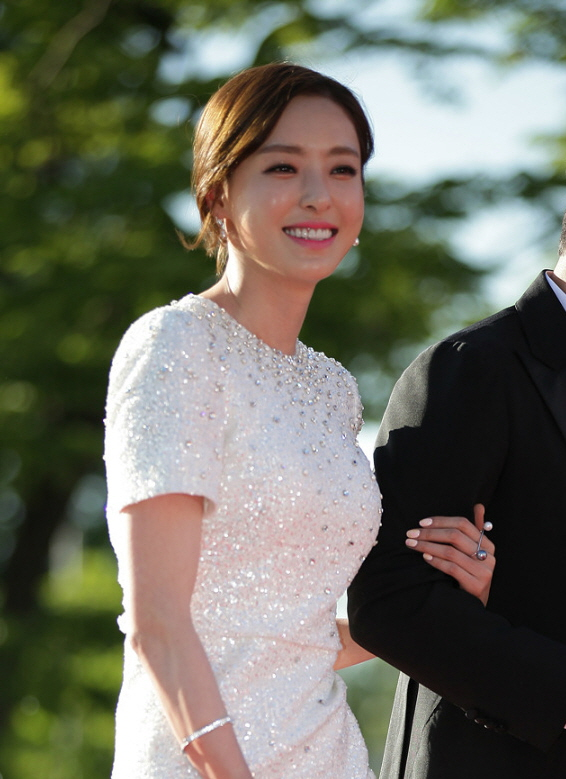
Lee at the 19th Bucheon International Fantastic Film Festival in 2015

Lee's breakout year was 2013, when she appeared in the hit courtroom drama I Can Hear Your Voice. This was followed by her first leading role in a television drama, the 2014 revenge drama Big Man. Her popularity increased further when she appeared in the 2015 drama Mrs. Cop. In 2016, Lee signed with the talent agency Huayi Brothers.

In 2018, Lee starred in the hit romantic comedy series The Beauty Inside. In 2019, Lee was cast as one of three female leads in the romance drama Search: WWW alongside Lee Jae-wook. On July 3, she was announced as a host for the girl group reality series Queendom alongside Jang Sung-kyu, and premiered in late August.

On March 11, 2020, she was announced as a host, alongside Jang Sung-kyu, for the upcoming Mnet boy group reality series Road to Kingdom, which is the sequel to Queendom.

In November 2022, Lee signed with Ghost Studio.

On October 15, 2025, Lee was announced as a host for the upcoming Korean Baking competition show Bake Your Dream.

== Personal life ==
Lee Da-hee has a younger brother, Lee Tae-hee (born 1994), who is also an actor and is represented by the same talent agency. In August 2025, she posted a photograph from a movie outing with him, accompanied by the caption "I love you," which led some followers to briefly mistake him for a romantic partner. On March 17, 2026, Lee shared photos and videos of herself with her younger brother at a self‑photo studio. The poses, including her touching his cheek and their close proximity, prompted fans to again mistake him for her boyfriend before his identity was clarified.

== Filmography ==
=== Film ===
Year	Title	Role	Ref.
2008	Delivering Love	Jang Na-rae	
2010	Harmony	Gong Na-yeong	
2015	Begin Again	Jeong Da-jeong	
2026	Husbands in Action	Hye-ran	

=== Television series ===
Year	Title	Role	Notes	Ref.
2003	Thousand Years of Love	Cafe girl		
2003	Open Drama – "That's How The Star Came to Us"	Mi-hui		
2004	Into the Storm	Lee Jeong-yeon		
2005	Sad Love Story	Kang Shin-hee		
2007	Air City	Han Yi-kyung		
2007	The Legend	Gakdan		
2008	The Secret of Coocoo Island	Lee Da-hee		
2011	Royal Family	Prosecutor		
2011	I Need Romance	Lee Min-jung	Cameo (Ep. 16)	
2011	Birdie Buddy	Min Hae-ryung		
2011	Saving Mrs. Go Bong-shil	Oh Eun-mi	Cameo	
2012	Welcome Rain to My Life	Han Dan-bi		
2013	I Can Hear Your Voice	Seo Do-yeon		
2013	Secret Love	Shin Se-yeon		
2014	Big Man	So Mi-ra		
2015	Mrs. Cop	Min Do-young		
2018	Queen of Mystery 2	Jung Hee-yeon/Seo Hyun-soo		
2018	The Beauty Inside	Kang Sa-ra		
2019	Search: WWW	Cha Hyeon		
2021	L.U.C.A.: The Beginning	Goo Reum		
2022	Love Is for Suckers	Goo Yeo-reum		
2022–2023	Island	Won Mi-ho		
2025	The Divorce Insurance	Jeon Na-rae		
2025	S Line	Gyu-jin		

=== Television show ===
Year	Title	Role	Notes	Ref.
2011	Food Essay	Host		
2015	Real Men	Cast member	season 1	
2015–2016	Entertainment Weekly	Host		
2017–2018	Law of the Jungle in Cook Island	Part of second half cast members.	Episodes 299–301	
2018	Law of the Jungle in Sabah	Cast member	Episode 330–333	
2019	Queendom	Host		
2020	Road to Kingdom	Host		
2024	Build Up: Vocal Boy Group Survival	Host		
2026	Veiled Cup	Host		
2026	Bake Your Dream	Host		

=== Web show ===
Year	Title	Role	Notes	Ref.
2021–2026	Single's Inferno	Host	Season 1–5	

=== Music video appearances ===
Year	Title	Artist	Ref.
2007	"To Some Degree of Love"	Tim	
2012	"Far Away... Young Love"	C-Clown	
2013	"Missing You Today"	Davichi	
2014	"Arm Pillow"	Davichi	

=== Hosting ===
Year	Title	Notes	Ref.
2020	34th Golden Disc Awards	Day 1 with Sung Si-kyung	
2021	35th Golden Disc Awards	Day 2 with Sung Si-kyung	
2022	36th Golden Disc Awards	with Sung Si-kyung and Lee Seung-gi	
2023	37th Golden Disc Awards	with Sung Si-kyung, Park So-dam and Nichkhun	

== Discography ==
=== Soundtrack appearances ===
Title	Year	Album
"You In The TV (Tv에서 보는 그대 모습은)"	2019	Search:WWW OST Part 6
"Your Eyes (Acoustic Ver.)"	2021	L.U.C.A.: The Beginning OST Part 3
"I Want Love" (사랑을 원해) (with Choi Si-won)	2022	Love Is for Suckers OST Part 3

== Awards and nominations ==
Name of the award ceremony, year presented, category, nominee of the award, and the result of the nomination
Award ceremony	Year	Category	Nominee / work	Result	Ref.
Asia Artist Awards	2018	Asia Brilliant Award	The Beauty Inside	Won	
Baeksang Arts Awards	2019	Best Supporting Actress – Television	The Beauty Inside	Nominated	
Blue Dragon Series Awards	2022	Best New Female Entertainer	Single's Inferno	Nominated	
Dong-A.com's Pick	2019	Sister Take Me Award	Lee Da-hee	Won	
KBS Drama Awards	2013	Best Supporting Actress	Secret Love	Won	
KBS Drama Awards	2013	Netizen Award, Actress	Secret Love	Nominated	
KBS Drama Awards	2013	Best Couple Award	Lee Da-hee (with Bae Soo-bin); Secret Love	Nominated	
KBS Drama Awards	2014	Excellence Award, Actress in a Miniseries	Big Man	Nominated	
KBS Drama Awards	2014	Popularity Award, Actress	Big Man	Won	
Korea Drama Awards	2013	Excellence Award, Actress	I Can Hear Your Voice	Nominated	
MBC Entertainment Awards	2015	Top Female Excellence Award in Variety Show	Real Men: Female Edition 2	Nominated	
SBS Drama Awards	2013	New Star Award	I Can Hear Your Voice	Won	
SBS Drama Awards	2013	Excellence Award, Actress in a Miniseries	I Can Hear Your Voice	Nominated	
SBS Drama Awards	2015	Special Award, Actress in a Miniseries	Mrs. Cop	Won	
SBS Entertainment Awards	2018	Best Challenge Award	Running Man	Nominated	
Soompi Awards	2019	Best Supporting Actress	The Beauty Inside	Nominated	
