= Bake Your Dream =

South Korean television show

- Hangul: 베이크 유어 드림
- Lit.: Bake Your Dream
- RR: Beikeu yueo deurim
- MR: Peik'ŭ yuŏ tŭrim
- Genre: Cooking; Reality competition
- Presented by: Lee Da-hee
- Starring: Judges: Lee Seok-won; Kim Narae; Kwon Seong-joon; Mimi; Noh Hee-young
- Country of origin: South Korea
- Original language: Korean
- No. of seasons: TBA
- No. of episodes: TBA

Production
- Executive producer: Yoon Se-young

Original release
- Network: MBN
- Release: February 1, 2026 – present

Cheonha Bakery: Bake Your Dream (Korean: 천하제빵 : 베이크 유어 드림), also known as Bake Your Dream, is a South Korean cooking reality competition, hosted by actress Lee Da-hee, featuring the 72 bakers around the world, competing for the prize of ₩ million and other numerous prizes to build their own brand. The series premiered on MBN, started from February 1, 2026 at 21:40 KST.

== Judges ==
The competition were judged by, Master Craftsman Chef Lee Seok-won, world-class Pastry Chef Kim Narae, Culinary Class Wars winner Chef Kwon Seong-joon, Idol and Member of Oh My Girl Mimi and brand creator genius Noh Hee-young.

== Contestants ==
All 72 contestants who came from around the world to competed to be the best baker are either chefs or bakers. Throughout the competition, the contestants were competing either against each other or in a team. The youngest contestant in the competition is Chef Kim Kyu-rin (14 years old), while the oldest contestant is Cheong Pil-sun (73 years old).

Several contestants that were known in the competition are:

- Chef An Byeong-Tae - Former Culinary Class Wars contestant and Korean Chicken War winner.
- Chef Hwang Ji-oh - Chef Choi Hyun-seok's student at "Choi" Restaurant.
- Chef Jang Kyung-joo - First female korean chef to win the iba UIBC Cup in 2025.
- Chef Kim In-seok - First-ever Two-time iba UIBC Cup 2025 winner.
- Chef Kim Kyu-rin - The youngest chef to win numerous awards.
- Chef Kwon Soon-seong - First Korean chef to win the iba UIBC Cup in 2012.
- Chef Lee Kyung-mu - 2024 Coupe du Monde de la Boulangerie runner-up
- Chef Nam Jeong-seok - Former Culinary Class Wars contestant
- Chef Yoon Yeon-jung - was known as "Patent King" for his 5 baking recipe patents, ranked 9th at the world pastry cup and the runner-up of Asia pastry cup.
- Chef Yoon Hwa-young - a world-renowned Chef for his Korean-French fusion cuisine and the 2025 LA LISTE Bakery Discovery Gem Award winner.
- Joo Young-seok - Former Rapper and Former member of Korean boy group SMASH.
- Lee Hye-sung - Former KBS announcer.
- Lee Sang-ho - Former SBS Producer.
- Park Dool-seon - Top Model Veteran.
- Pricilia Carla Yules - Miss Indonesia 2020 winner.

== Airtime ==
Season	Air date	Airtime
1	February 1, 2026 - present	Sundays at 21:40 (KST)

== Episodes ==
Ep.	Original broadcast date	Mission	Team	Result	Contestant eliminated	Guest appearance	Ref.
1	February 1, 2026	create signature bread that represented the contestant	N/A	N/A	Kim Eun-hee, Na Su-ji, Bang Jun-ho, Kim Young-sik, Oh Se-sung, Lim Hoon, Kim Seong-yong, Son Sung-pil, Koo Ja-hong, Yoon Jong-chan, An Byeong-Tae, Yoon Hwa-young, Nam Jeong-seok, Ki Yong-nam, Park Dool-seon, Kim In-seok, Clément Bosch, Kim Ji-ho. (Note: Oh Se-sung is the first contestant who had his signature dish rejected by all the judges without further evaluations.)	Chef Choi Hyun-seok (archive recording only)	
2	February 8, 2026	create signature bread that represented the contestant	N/A	N/A	Kim Eun-hee, Na Su-ji, Bang Jun-ho, Kim Young-sik, Oh Se-sung, Lim Hoon, Kim Seong-yong, Son Sung-pil, Koo Ja-hong, Yoon Jong-chan, An Byeong-Tae, Yoon Hwa-young, Nam Jeong-seok, Ki Yong-nam, Park Dool-seon, Kim In-seok, Clément Bosch, Kim Ji-ho.	Chef Choi Hyun-seok (archive recording only)	
3	February 15, 2026 (Note: Kim In-seok is the first contestant who returned from the eliminations.)	create bread dishes for the perfect day.	Team Picnic Day (Cho Song-ah, Im Dong-seok, Kwon Soon-seong, Kim Ji-ho); Team Exercise Day (Jung Nam-mi, Susumu Kobayashi, Kim Kyu-rin, Kim In-seok); Team Flirting Day (Kim Dam-hyun, Hwang Ji-oh, Kwak Dong-uk, Kim Myung-joon; Team Hangover Day (Lee Kyung-mu, Seon Min-soo, Lee Hong-gyu, Lee Hye-sung) Team Dopamine Day (Yoon Hwa-young, Alessio Galli, Jae In-young, Jeong Min); Team Cheat Meal Day (Jung Jung-hoon, Kim Jin-seo, Go Jae-wook, Joo Young-seok); Team Depressed Day (Jang Gyeong-ju, Kim Si-Yeop, Cho Sang-min, Cho Jung-hoon); Team Sunday Morning (Yoon Yeon-jung, Kim Jeong-un, Seo Yong-seok, Oh Seung-geun)	Result: 1st Place - Team Depressed Day; 2nd Place - Team Hangover Day; 3rd Place - Team Flirting Day; Additional Result: Cho Song-ah, Hwang Ji-oh, Joo Young-seok, Im Dong-seok, Kim Jin-seo, Kwak Dong-uk, Oh Seung-geun and Yoon Hwa-young were safe from the elimination.	Elimination: Team Exercise Day (Jung Nam-mi, Susumu Kobayashi, Kim Kyu-rin, Kim In-seok); Team Picnic Day (Kwon Soon-seong and Kim Ji-ho) Team Flirting Day (Kim Dam-hyun and Kim Myung-joon); Team Cheat Meal Day (Jung Jung-hoon, Kim Jin-seo and Go Jae-wook); Team Dopamine Day (Alessio Galli, Jae In-young and Jeong Min); Team Sunday Morning Day (Yoon Yeon-jung, Kim Jeong-un and Seo Yong-seok).	F&B Expert Cha Seung-hee.	
4	February 22, 2026	create bread dishes for the perfect day.		Result: 1st Place - Team Depressed Day; 2nd Place - Team Hangover Day; 3rd Place - Team Flirting Day; Additional Result: Cho Song-ah, Hwang Ji-oh, Joo Young-seok, Im Dong-seok, Kim Jin-seo, Kwak Dong-uk, Oh Seung-geun and Yoon Hwa-young were safe from the elimination.	Elimination: Team Exercise Day (Jung Nam-mi, Susumu Kobayashi, Kim Kyu-rin, Kim In-seok); Team Picnic Day (Kwon Soon-seong and Kim Ji-ho) Team Flirting Day (Kim Dam-hyun and Kim Myung-joon); Team Cheat Meal Day (Jung Jung-hoon, Kim Jin-seo and Go Jae-wook); Team Dopamine Day (Alessio Galli, Jae In-young and Jeong Min); Team Sunday Morning Day (Yoon Yeon-jung, Kim Jeong-un and Seo Yong-seok).	F&B Expert Cha Seung-hee.	
5	March 1, 2026	Main Mission: Compete against each other on recreating classic dishes. Wild Card Mission: create a dish without oven using only ingredients from the fridge.	Main Mission: Korean Peanut Streusel Bread - (Lee Hong-gyu Vs. Lee Hye-sung); Monaka - (Lee Kyung-mu Vs. Cho Sang-min); Choco Pies - (Jang Gyeong-ju Vs. Oh Seung-geun); Shrimp Chips - (Hwang Ji-oh Vs. Kim Si-yeop); Cream Bread - (Kim Jin-seo Vs. Seon Min-soo); Rice Punch - (Cho Jung-hoon Vs. Yoon Hwa-young); Sweet Red Bean Bread - (Joo Young-seok Vs. Im Dong-seok); Cheetos - (Kwak Dong-uk Vs. Cho Song-ah) Wild Card Mission: N/A	Main Mission; Result: Lee Hye-sun, Jang Gyeong-ju, Kim Si-yeop, Kim Jin-seo, Yoon Hwa-young, Joo Young-seok, Kwak Dong-uk and Lee Kyung-mu were advanced to semi-finals. Wild Card Mission; Result: Seon Min-soo and Hwang Ji-oh were advanced to semi-finals.	Main Mission; Elimination: Lee Hong-gyu, Oh Seung-geun, Hwang Ji-oh, Seon Min-soo, Cho Jung-hoon, Im Dong-seok, Cho Song-ah and Cho Sang-min. Wild Card Mission: Elimination: Lee Hong-gyu, Oh Seung-geun, Cho Jung-hoon, Im Dong-seok, Cho Song-ah and Cho Sang-min.	Main Mission: Chef Lee Ji-myeong; Actor/Chef Ryu Soo-young; Content Creator Kwak Joon-bin Wild Card Mission: N/A	
6	March 8, 2026	Main Mission: Compete against each other on recreating classic dishes. Wild Card Mission: create a dish without oven using only ingredients from the fridge.	Main Mission: Korean Peanut Streusel Bread - (Lee Hong-gyu Vs. Lee Hye-sung); Monaka - (Lee Kyung-mu Vs. Cho Sang-min); Choco Pies - (Jang Gyeong-ju Vs. Oh Seung-geun); Shrimp Chips - (Hwang Ji-oh Vs. Kim Si-yeop); Cream Bread - (Kim Jin-seo Vs. Seon Min-soo); Rice Punch - (Cho Jung-hoon Vs. Yoon Hwa-young); Sweet Red Bean Bread - (Joo Young-seok Vs. Im Dong-seok); Cheetos - (Kwak Dong-uk Vs. Cho Song-ah) Wild Card Mission: N/A	Main Mission; Result: Lee Hye-sun, Jang Gyeong-ju, Kim Si-yeop, Kim Jin-seo, Yoon Hwa-young, Joo Young-seok, Kwak Dong-uk and Lee Kyung-mu were advanced to semi-finals. Wild Card Mission; Result: Seon Min-soo and Hwang Ji-oh were advanced to semi-finals.	Main Mission; Elimination: Lee Hong-gyu, Oh Seung-geun, Hwang Ji-oh, Seon Min-soo, Cho Jung-hoon, Im Dong-seok, Cho Song-ah and Cho Sang-min. Wild Card Mission: Elimination: Lee Hong-gyu, Oh Seung-geun, Cho Jung-hoon, Im Dong-seok, Cho Song-ah and Cho Sang-min.	Main Mission: Chef Lee Ji-myeong; Actor/Chef Ryu Soo-young; Content Creator Kwak Joon-bin Wild Card Mission: N/A	
7	March 15, 2026	Bake a Korean local bread that represent a city.	N/A	Yoon Hwa-young, Lee kyung-mu, Kim Jin-seo, Hwang Ji-oh, Kim Si-yeop, Seong Min-soo and Joo Young-seok were advanced to the finals.	Lee Hye-sun, Jang Gyeong-ju and Kwak Dong-uk.	Marketing & Food Specialist Yeo Myung-lang	
8	March 22, 2026	Bake a Korean local bread that represent a city.	N/A	Yoon Hwa-young, Lee kyung-mu, Kim Jin-seo, Hwang Ji-oh, Kim Si-yeop, Seong Min-soo and Joo Young-seok were advanced to the finals.	Lee Hye-sun, Jang Gyeong-ju and Kwak Dong-uk.	Marketing & Food Specialist Yeo Myung-lang	
9	March 29, 2026	Round 1: Bake international dish for a meals Round 2: TBA	Round 1: Chinese Cuisines - Hwang Ji-oh & Hwang Jin-seon; Japanese Cuisines - Lee Kyung-mu & Ahn Yu-seong; Thai Cuisines - Kim Jin-seo & Kim Yoo-ah; French Cuisines - Kim Si-yeop & Lee Seung-jun; Korean Cuisines - Seong Min-soo & Lee Won-il; French Cuisines - Yoo Hwa-young & Oh Se-deuk; Korean Cuisines - Joo Young-seok & Cho Seo-hyeong Round 2: TBA	TBA	TBA	Atomix NYC Restaurant CEO/Manager Park Jeong-eun	
8	April 5, 2026	Round 1: Bake international dish for a meals Round 2: TBA	Round 1: Chinese Cuisines - Hwang Ji-oh & Hwang Jin-seon; Japanese Cuisines - Lee Kyung-mu & Ahn Yu-seong; Thai Cuisines - Kim Jin-seo & Kim Yoo-ah; French Cuisines - Kim Si-yeop & Lee Seung-jun; Korean Cuisines - Seong Min-soo & Lee Won-il; French Cuisines - Yoo Hwa-young & Oh Se-deuk; Korean Cuisines - Joo Young-seok & Cho Seo-hyeong Round 2: TBA	TBA	TBA	Atomix NYC Restaurant CEO/Manager Park Jeong-eun	
