= Helios (film) =

2015 Hong Kong-Chinese film by Longman Leung and Sunny Luk

- Film poster
- Traditional Chinese: 赤道
- Simplified Chinese: 赤道
- Hanyu Pinyin: Chì Dào
- Jyutping: Cek3 Dou6
- Directed by: Longman Leung; Sunny Luk
- Screenplay by: Longman Leung; Sunny Luk
- Produced by: Catherine Kwan
- Starring: Jacky Cheung; Nick Cheung; Shawn Yue; Wang Xueqi; Janice Man; Ji Jin-hee; Choi Siwon; Yoon Jin-yi; Josephine Koo; Feng Wenjuan; Lee Tae-ran; Kim Hae-sook; Chang Chen
- Cinematography: Jason Kwan
- Edited by: Ron Chan; Wong Hoi
- Music by: Peter Kam
- Production companies: Media Asia Films; Wanda Pictures; Sun Entertainment Culture; Sil-Metropole Organisation; Long Motion Pictures; Media Asia Distribution (Beijing); Blue Sea Productions
- Distributed by: Media Asia Distributions
- Release dates: 30 April 2015 (China); 1 May 2015 (Hong Kong)
- Running time: 119 minutes
- Countries: Hong Kong; China
- Languages: Cantonese; Mandarin; Korean; English
- Budget: US$18−26 million
- Box office: US$33.15 million (China)

Helios is a 2015 crime thriller film directed by Longman Leung and Sunny Luk. The film is a Hong Kong-Chinese co-production and stars an international ensemble cast from Hong Kong, China, Taiwan and South Korea. It was released on 30 April 2015 in China and 1 May 2015 in Hong Kong.

== Plot ==
South Korea's most wanted criminal, "Helios" (Chang Chen), and his assistant "Messenger" (Janice Man), have stolen a weapon of mass destruction secretly developed by the South Korean military: a portable nuclear explosive device (DC8), along with sixteen fuel modules. The police forces of Hong Kong, China, and South Korea have been informed that Helios will hold an underground negotiation for the weapon in Hong Kong.

An emergency response team is set up, including chief inspector Eric Lee Yan-ming (Nick Cheung) of the Counter-Terrorism Response Unit, senior Chinese official Song An (Wang Xueqi), and two South Korean weapons experts: Choi Min-ho (Ji Jin-hee) and Park Woo-Cheol (Choi Siwon). The team work together to trace the whereabouts of the weapon. Lee invites Physics professor Siu Chi-yan (Jacky Cheung) of the University of Hong Kong to serve as special adviser for the operation.

Hong Kong, China and South Korea have the same objective, though with different goals. Choi wants to hunt down Helios, take back the weapon, and ensure that South Korean military secrets are not divulged. Representing the Chinese government, Song wants to resolve the crisis in Hong Kong and limit any terrorist activities in Hong Kong or Chinese territories. Lee and Siu, members of the Counter-Terrorism Response Unit, have to deal with the greatest challenge, facing pressure from both China and South Korea.

Messenger is arrested, and DC8 falls into the hands of the Hong Kong Police Force. Agents of China and Korea fight to possess the weapon. Meanwhile, Helios appears in Macau, with plans to retaliate and repossess the weapon. In the final confrontation, unsuspected conspiracies are revealed and Professor Siu is revealed as the real "Helios," with everyone caught off guard.

== Cast ==
- Jacky Cheung as Professor Siu Chi-yan (肇志仁), a Physics professor at the University of Hong Kong and a crisis expert who opposes DC8 to remain in Hong Kong, revealed as the real "Helios".
- Nick Cheung as Eric Lee Yan-ming (李彦明), Chief Inspector of the Counter-Terrorism Response Unit and commander of the emergency response team.
- Shawn Yue as Fan Ka-ming (范家明), Senior Inspector of the Counter-Terrorism Response Unit who formerly served in the Special Duties Unit and Criminal Intelligence Bureau. He is one of the deputy commanders of the emergency response team.
- Wang Xueqi as Song Ahn (宋鞍), a senior official from China government who advocates the use of diplomatic means to deal with the crisis. He also advocates DC8 to remain in Hong Kong.
- Janice Man as Zhang Yiyun (張怡君), nicknamed the "Messenger", Gam Dao-nin's assistant
- Ji Jin-hee as Choi Min-ho (崔民浩), deputy director of officer of South Korea's National Intelligence Service and defense weapon expert. With a Ph.D. in mechanical engineering and physics, he came from a family of scientists. However, due to a research accident, he became the sole survivor of his family and was admitted lifelong immunization.
- Choi Siwon as Park Woo-Cheol (朴宇哲), a South Korean special agent responsible for protecting Choi Min-ho's safety.
- Yoon Jin-yi as Shin Mi-Kyung (申美京), a South Korean spy sent to Hong Kong to assist Choi Min-ho and Park Woo-cheul in their mission. She works in a magazine publishing company to cover up her identity.
- Josephine Koo as Sophia, a former arms smuggler sixteen years ago and has since retired and relocated in Macau. She is also Gam Dao-nin's godmother and was later killed by her godson to cover up a secret.
- Feng Wenjuan as Yuan Xiaowen (袁曉文), Chief Secretary of Mr. Song
- Lee Tae-ran as Yoon Hee-seon, Choi Min-ho's wife
- Kim Hae-sook as Park Young-sook, Director of NIS
- Chang Chen as Gam Dao-nin (金燾年), a South Korean weapon smuggler who is rumored to be top wanted criminal "Helios", while in actuality, he was formulated by the real "Helios" to be responsible for executing his plot.
- Tracy Chu as Tracy, an inspector of the Counter-Terrorism Response Unit and one of the deputy commanders of the emergency response team
- Philip Keung as Wong Kin-Chung (王建中), a member of the emergency response team
- Benny Lee as a member of the emergency response team representing the Immigration Department
- Eric Chung as a member of the emergency response team representing the Leisure and Cultural Services Department
- Ben Yuen as Representative of Transport Department
- Timothy Cheng as a member of the emergency response team representing the Fire Services Department
- Rachel Kan as a member of the emergency response team representing Hospital Authority
- Chan Suk-yee as Director of Immigration
- Paul Fonoroff as Martin Koo, a foreign journalist
- Gill Mohindepaul Singh as Saad
- Icy Wong as a reporter
- Mike Leeder as Mr. Big, Middle Eastern buyer
- Philippe Joly as one of Mr. Big's bodyguards
- Kim Hye-yoon as Park Woo-cheol's sister

== Release ==
The film held its first press conference on 10 December 2013 at the Sheraton Hotel in Macau where its first trailer was unveiled. The film was released in China on 30 April 2015.

== Box office ==
The film opened in China on 30 April 2015 and earned US$20.68 million in its four-day opening weekend, with 101,873 screenings and 3.24 million admissions, coming in fourth place at the Chinese box office behind Furious 7, You Are My Sunshine and The Left Ear. In Hong Kong, the film has grossed a total of HK$15.9 million (US$2.06 million).
