= Yoon Jun-won =

South Korean actor (born 1994)

- Born: October 26, 1994 (age 31); South Korea
- Education: Soongsil University (Department of Law)
- Occupations: Actor; singer
- Agent: L' July

Korean name
- Hangul: 윤준원
- RR: Yun Junwon
- MR: Yun Chunwŏn

Yoon Jun-won (Korean: 윤준원; born on October 26, 1994) is a South Korean actor and singer who is a former member of the boy group The Man Blk.

== Filmography ==
=== Film ===
Year	Title	Role	Ref.
2023	Toxic Parents	Kim Gi-beom	
TBA	Changhon: Night of Salvation	Detective Kim	

=== Television series ===
Year	Title	Role	Notes	Ref.
2018	Govengers	A devil		
2019–2020	Best Mistake	Seo Joo-hoo	Season 1–2	
2022	Cheer Up			
2024	Serendipity's Embrace	Joseph Oh		
2024	Eccentric Romance	Seong-hun		
2025	Please Take Care of the Five Eagle Brothers	Han-gyeol		
2026	Mad Concrete Dreams	Yoon Bo-ram		

=== Web series ===
Year	Title	Role	Ref.
2020	Cha Ta Gong In	Seung-byul	
