= Love Is for Suckers (TV series) =

2022 South Korean television series

- Promotional poster
- Also known as: Icy Cold Romance
- Hangul: 얼어죽을 연애따위
- Lit.: Love That Will Freeze to Death
- RR: Eoreojugeul yeonaettawi
- MR: Ŏrŏjugŭl yŏnaettawi
- Genre: Romantic comedy
- Written by: Kim Sol-ji
- Directed by: Choi Gyu-sik
- Starring: Lee Da-hee; Choi Si-won
- Music by: Jeong Seung-hyun; Seo Seong-won
- Country of origin: South Korea
- Original language: Korean
- No. of episodes: 16

Production
- Executive producer: Kim Hyeon-jung
- Producers: Bae Seon-hae; Yoo Cheol-yong; Jo Han-sook
- Running time: 60 minutes
- Production company: Story TV

Original release
- Network: ENA
- Release: October 5 – December 1, 2022

Love Is for Suckers (Korean: 얼어죽을 연애따위) is a 2022 South Korean television series starring Lee Da-hee and Choi Si-won. It aired on ENA from October 5 to December 1, 2022, every Wednesday and Thursday at 21:00 (KST).

== Synopsis ==
The series is about the romance between 20-year-old best friends in their 30s, who unexpectedly meet in a reality dating show as its production director and cast member, and begin experiencing romantic feelings for each other.

== Cast ==
=== Main ===
- Lee Da-hee as Goo Yeo-reum, an entertainment production director for ten years who is desperate for work and love.
- Choi Si-won as Park Jae-hoon, a plastic surgeon who has lost interest in both work and love.

=== Supporting ===
- Cho Soo-hyang as Kang Chae-ri
- Park Yeon-woo as John Jang
- Lee Joo-yeon as Han Ji-yeon
- Lee Dae-hwi as Kim Sang-woo

=== Extended ===
- Im Ha-ryong as Goo Yong-sik
- Yang Hee-kyung as Yoon Young-hee
- Min Jin-woong as Park Dae-sik
- Noh Sussanna as Oh Hye-jin
- Song Jong-ho as Kim In-woo
- Seo Joon as Kim Jun-ho
- Lee Cheol-woo as Lee Hoon-hee
- Kang Seo-joon as Hwang Jang-gun
- Son Hwa-ryeong as Park Ji-wan
- Kim Ji-soo as Jang Tae-mi
- Moon Ye-won as Ahn So-yeon
- Lee Yoo-jin as Geum Su-mi
- Jang Seo-yeon as Park Hyeon-so
- Lee Seok-joon as Ma Jin-guk
- Ahn So-jin as Ga-rim
- Joo Jae-hu as Hee-chang
- Lee Seo-an as Ri-eun

=== Special appearances ===
- Gabee as herself
- Kwon Yul as Baek Jun-yeol

== Viewership ==
Love Is for Suckers : South Korea viewers per episode (thousands)

Season	Episode number															
Season	1	2	3	4	5	6	7	8	9	10	11	12	13	14	15	16
1	N/A	273	255	284	430	408	256	319	286	281	253	359	394	282	296	389

Source: Audience measurement performed nationwide by Nielsen Korea.

Average TV viewership ratings
Ep.	Original broadcast date	Average audience share (Nielsen Korea)	
Ep.	Original broadcast date	Nationwide	Seoul
1	October 5, 2022	0.843% (22nd)	N/A
2	October 6, 2022	1.239% (7th)	1.319% (7th)
3	October 12, 2022	1.192% (7th)	1.431% (5th)
4	October 13, 2022	1.525% (5th)	1.791% (4th)
5	October 19, 2022	1.944% (4th)	2.265% (4th)
6	October 20, 2022	1.793% (4th)	2.122% (4th)
7	October 26, 2022	1.247% (10th)	1.559% (6th)
8	October 27, 2022	1.406% (5th)	1.433% (6th)
9	November 9, 2022 (Note: The broadcast on November 2 and 3, 2022 were canceled due to the national mourning period after the Seoul Halloween crowd crush tragedy. Episodes 9 and 10 aired on November 9 and 10, respectively.)	1.325% (6th)	1.737% (6th)
10	November 10, 2022	1.332% (8th)	1.504% (7th)
11	November 16, 2022	1.386% (3rd)	1.728% (3rd)
12	November 17, 2022	1.860% (3rd)	2.393% (3rd)
13	November 23, 2022	1.760% (4th)	1.883% (4th)
14	November 24, 2022	1.471% (4th)	1.531% (4th)
15	November 30, 2022	1.350% (6th)	1.623% (3rd)
16	December 1, 2022	2.172% (3rd)	2.483% (3rd)
In the table above, the blue numbers represent the lowest published ratings and the red numbers represent the highest published ratings.; N/A denotes rating that was not released.; This series aired on a cable channel/pay TV which normally has a relatively smaller audience compared to free-to-air TV/public broadcasters (KBS, SBS, MBC and EBS).
