= Legend of Hyang Dan =

- Also known as: Hyangdan
- Hangul: 향단전
- RR: Hyangdanjeon
- MR: Hyangdanjŏn
- Directed by: Kim Sang-ho
- Starring: Seo Ji-hye; Choi Siwon
- Country of origin: South Korea
- No. of episodes: 2

Production
- Running time: 60 minutes

Original release
- Network: MBC
- Release: September 3 – September 4, 2007

Legend of Hyang Dan (Korean: 향단전) is a 2-episode Korean TV drama that first aired on September 3, 2007 on MBC.

== Plot ==
A "what if" parody of Legend of Chun Hyang, based on the classic Korean story Chunhyangga. What if Lee Mong-ryong fell in love with the servant girl Hyang-dan instead of Chun-hyang?

== Cast ==
- Seo Ji-hye as Hyang-dan
- Choi Si-won as Lee Mong-ryong
- Lee Ji-soo as Chun-hyang
- Heo Jung-min as Bang-ja
- Bang Eun-hee as Wol-mae (Chun-hyang's mother)
- Im Hyun-sik as Heo-joon
- Jung Han-heon as Shim Hak-gyoo
- Kim Dong-hyun as Seok Ho-pil
- Kim Se-ah as Seok Ho-soon
