= Mad Concrete Dreams =

2026 South Korean television series

- Promotional poster
- Hangul: 대한민국에서 건물주 되는 법
- Hanja: 大韓民國에서 建物主 되는 法
- Lit.: How to Become a Building Owner in South Korea
- RR: Daehanmingugeseo geonmulju doeneun beop
- MR: Taehanmin'gugesŏ kŏnmulchu toenŭn pŏp
- Genre: Crime thriller; Black comedy
- Written by: Oh Han-ki
- Directed by: Yim Pil-sung
- Starring: Ha Jung-woo; Im Soo-jung; Kim Jun-han; Jung Soo-jung; Shim Eun-kyung
- Music by: Dalpalan
- Country of origin: South Korea
- Original language: Korean
- No. of episodes: 12

Production
- Running time: 70 minutes
- Production companies: Studio Dragon; Mindmark; Studio 329

Original release
- Network: tvN
- Release: March 14 – April 19, 2026

Mad Concrete Dreams (Korean: 대한민국에서 건물주 되는 법) is a 2026 South Korean crime thriller black comedy television series written by Oh Han-ki, directed by Yim Pil-sung, and starring Ha Jung-woo, Im Soo-jung, Kim Jun-han, Jung Soo-jung, and Shim Eun-kyung. The series follow a building owner who becomes involved in a kidnapping plot to resolve his mounting debts. It aired on tvN from March 14, to April 19, 2026, every Saturday and Sunday at 21:10 (KST). It is also available for streaming on TVING, HBO Max, and Rakuten Viki.

== Synopsis ==
Ki Su-jong acquires a building in Seoul by utilizing maximum available loans, a practice known as "Yeongkkeul" (gathering every available penny for loans). Despite achieving the status of a property owner, he faces severe financial distress due to the resulting debt. To prevent the foreclosure of the building and support his family, Su-jong becomes involved in a criminal scheme. However, the plan deviates from the original intent, leading to unforeseen legal and personal complications.

== Cast and characters ==
=== Main ===
- Ha Jung-woo as Ki Su-jong

The owner of Seyun Building, who is determined to achieve wealth and provide a better life for his wife and his brilliant, hearing-impaired daughter. Struggling with debt, tenant issues, and the threat of losing his building, he is lured into a kidnapping scheme by Hwal-seong's promise of easy money, only to become involved in crime.

- Im Soo-jung as Kim Seon

Su-jong's wife and a strong-willed mother. She resolves to protect her daughter and family, refusing to let their lives collapse because of Su-jong's choices.

- Kim Jun-han as Min Hwal-seong

Su-jong's friend who is desperate to prove himself to his wealthy wife and disapproving mother-in-law. After borrowing money from a dangerous loan shark, he devises a fake kidnapping scheme to raise money and pulls Su-jong into it, ultimately dragging him into a dangerous scheme.

- Jung Soo-jung as Jeon Yi-kyung

Hwal-seong's wife and only daughter of a wealthy businesswoman. Her seemingly peaceful life is shattered when Hwal-seong and Su-jong's fake kidnapping scheme spirals out of control.

- Shim Eun-kyung as Yona

A ruthless operative at Real Capital's South Korea branch who has her sights set on Su-jong's building.

=== Supporting ===
Real Capital

- Lee Shin-ki as Dr. Jang, Yona's attendant
- Miyavi as Morgan Lee, an executive at Real Capital and Yona's superior

Sejeong-ro Redevelopment Project

- Kim Geum-soon as Jeon Yang-ja, owner of Pyeongbukgwan and Yi-kyung's mother
- Park Sung-il as Aide Nam, policy advisor at Seoul City Hall

Police

- Lee Joo-woo as Go Joo-ran, Assistant Inspector at Yongdaemun Police Station
- Shin Mun-sung as Squad Chief Geum, Senior Inspector at Yongdaemun Police Station
- Yoon Jun-won as Yoon Bo-ram, a detective at Yongdaemun Police Station

Seyun Building

- Hyun Bong-sik as Oh Dong-gim, cafe owner
- Nam Myeong-ryeol as Mr. Kim, owner of Hanmaeum Building
- Ryu Abel as Jang Hee-joo, Sejeong-ro real estate agent

Other

- Park Seo-kyung as Ki Da-rae, Su-jong's daughter

=== Special appearances ===
- Kim Nam-gil as Kim Kyun
- Ju Ji-hoon

== Production ==
=== Development ===
The series was developed under the working title Building Owner (Korean: 건물주; RR: Geonmulju) before being finalized as Mad Concrete Dreams. It is planned by Studio Dragon, a co-production between Mindmark and Studio 329, directed by Yim Pil-sung, and written by Oh Han-ki, a critically acclaimed novelist (winner of the 7th Young Writers' Award) making his debut as a TV screenwriter. The plot is a crime thriller and black comedy centered on the financial pressures of property ownership and a "fake kidnapping" that escalates into a genuine criminal incident.

=== Casting ===
The casting process was finalized in late June 2025. Ha Jung-woo was cast in the lead role, marking his return to a domestic television network 19 years after the 2007 series H.I.T. Im Soo-jung joined the cast, this project is her first television role since 2021 and her second collaboration with Ha following the 2011 film Come Rain, Come Shine. Kim Jun-han, Jung Soo-jung, and Shim Eun-kyung were also cast. The role marks Shim's return to South Korean television after six years of working primarily in Japan. While Kim Geum-soon to play a supporting role and a special appearances for Kim Nam-gil and Ju Ji-hoon. Japanese rock star Miyavi would also make a special appearance marking his first in a Korean drama.

=== Filming ===
Principal photography began in July 2025.

== Release ==
Mad Concrete Dreams was slated to air on tvN in the first half of 2026. In early 2026, it was reported that the series is scheduled to premiere in March 2026, following Undercover Miss Hong. The series was confirmed to premiere on March 14, in tvN's Saturday–Sunday timeslot at 21:10 (KST). It will also be available for streaming on TVING and Wavve in South Korea, and internationally on HBO Max and Rakuten Viki.

== Viewership ==
According to Nielsen Korea, the first episode of Mad Concrete Dreams recorded an average nationwide household rating of 4.1% and a peak of 5.1%. In the Seoul metropolitan area, the episode averaged 4.4% with a peak of 5.4%.

Mad Concrete Dreams : South Korea viewers per episode (thousands)

| Season | Episode number | | | | | | | | | | | | Average |
| Season | 1 | 2 | 3 | 4 | 5 | 6 | 7 | 8 | 9 | 10 | 11 | 12 | Average |
|---|---|---|---|---|---|---|---|---|---|---|---|---|---|
| 1 | 1069 | 1125 | 724 | 916 | 659 | 838 | 697 | 677 | 471 | 715 | 596 | 884 | 781 |

Source: Audience measurement performed nationwide by Nielsen Korea.

Average TV viewership ratings
| Ep. | Original broadcast date | Average audience share (Nielsen Korea) | |
| Ep. | Original broadcast date | Nationwide | Seoul |
|---|---|---|---|
| 1 | March 14, 2026 | 4.124% (1st) | 4.372% (1st) |
| 2 | March 15, 2026 | 4.533% (1st) | 4.963% (1st) |
| 3 | March 21, 2025 | 3.131% (1st) | 3.140% (1st) |
| 4 | March 22, 2026 | 3.922% (1st) | 4.173% (1st) |
| 5 | March 28, 2026 | 2.605% (2nd) | 2.412% (2nd) |
| 6 | March 29, 2026 | 3.548% (1st) | 3.557% (1st) |
| 7 | April 4, 2026 | 2.948% (1st) | 3.131% (1st) |
| 8 | April 5, 2026 | 2.784% (1st) | 2.647% (1st) |
| 9 | April 11, 2026 | 2.025% (3rd) | 2.123% (2nd) |
| 10 | April 12, 2026 | 3.125% (2nd) | 3.178% (1st) |
| 11 | April 18, 2026 | 2.441% (1st) | 2.883% (1st) |
| 12 | April 19, 2026 | 3.718% (1st) | 3.876% (1st) |
| Average | | 3.242% | 3.371% |
In the table above, the blue numbers represent the lowest ratings and the red numbers represent the highest ratings.; This series aired on a cable channel/pay TV which normally has a relatively smaller audience compared to free-to-air TV/public broadcasters (KBS, SBS, MBC, and EBS).

== Accolades ==
| Award ceremony | Year | Category | Recipient(s) | Result | Ref. |
|---|---|---|---|---|---|
| Director's Cut Awards | 2026 | Best Actress (Drama) | Shim Eun-kyung | Nominated | |
| Director's Cut Awards | 2026 | Best New Actress (Drama) | Shim Eun-kyung | Nominated | |
