= Revolutionary Love =

2017 South Korean television series

- Promotional poster
- Also known as: Revolution
- Hangul: 변혁의 사랑
- Lit.: Byun Hyuk's Love
- RR: Byeonhyeogui sarang
- MR: Pyŏnhyŏgŭi sarang
- Genre: Romantic comedy
- Created by: Studio Dragon; Plot Line
- Written by: Joo Hyun
- Directed by: Song Hyun-wook
- Creative directors: Jinnie Choi (Studio Dragon); Kang Eun-kyung (Plot Line)
- Starring: Choi Si-won; Kang So-ra; Gong Myung
- Country of origin: South Korea
- Original language: Korean
- No. of episodes: 16

Production
- Executive producers: Ahn Jae-hyun; Shin Sang-yoon; Kim Young-kyu; Jang Young-woo
- Producer: Lee So-yoon
- Camera setup: Single-camera
- Running time: 60 minutes
- Production company: Samhwa Networks
- Budget: ₩6.96 billion

Original release
- Network: tvN
- Release: October 14 – December 3, 2017

Revolutionary Love (Korean: 변혁의 사랑) is a 2017 South Korean television series starring Choi Si-won, Kang So-ra and Gong Myung. It aired on tvN from October 14 to December 3, 2017.

== Synopsis ==
Byun Hyuk is the happy-go-lucky second son of Byun Kang-soo, the chairman of Gangsu Group. Byun Woo-sung, the elder son of Byun Kang-soo, is jealous of his younger brother and seizes opportunities to bring him down.

Kwon Jae-hoon is a long time friend of Byun Hyuk and is employed by Gangsu Group to cover up the follies of Hyuk. Jae-hoon's father is a loyal driver of Kang-soo and has also gone to jail because of Hyuk's mistake, which is the cause of Jae-hoon's hatred towards Hyuk.

Baek Joon is a street-smart girl who has multiple part-time jobs and refuses to settle in a full-time permanent job. Her father was wronged by Gangsu Group after being a loyal employee for a long time. She has a crush on Jae-hoon, who is extremely cold towards her.

When Byun Hyuk accidentally meets Baek Joon, he is wearing a custodian's uniform. This leads Joon to believe that Hyuk is just a regular employee of Gangsu Group. Later, when Hyuk is kicked out of his house, he comes to live with Jae-hoon. Joon forces Hyuk to take part-time jobs and in the process imbues him with the confidence to fight Gangsu Group's misconduct and oppressive business policies and practices.

With Woo-sung and Kang-soo fighting hard to bring Hyuk down, Kwon Jae-hoon, Byun Hyuk and Baek Joon unite to expose the corruption of Gangsu Group.

== Cast ==
=== Main ===
- Choi Si-won as Byun Hyuk

An unemployed third-generation chaebol who hides his true identity as the second son of a wealthy family and begins living in a studio apartment.

- Kang So-ra as Baek Joon

A hardworking young woman who has a university education but makes her living by working part-time jobs.

- Gong Myung as Kwon Jae-hoon
  - Son Sang-yeon as young Jae-hoon

A highly intelligent young man who is the chief of a secretarial team at a company owned by Byun Hyuk's family.

=== Supporting ===
People around Byun Hyuk

- Lee Jae-yoon as Byun Woo-sung

Byun Hyuk's brother.

- Choi Jae-sung as Byun Kang-soo

Byun Hyuk's father.

- Seo Yi-an as Hong Chae-ri

Byun Hyuk's ex-girlfriend and Chairman Hong's youngest daughter.

- Kyeon Mi-ri as Jung Yeo-jin

Byun Hyuk's mother.

- Jung Chan-bi as Byun Se-na

Byun Hyuk's sister.

- Kim Eung-suk as Byun Gang-ho

Byun Huk's uncle.

- Kim Ye-ryeong as Byun Geum-hee

Byun Hyuk's aunt.

People around Baek Joon

- Kim Ye-won as Ha Yeon-hee

Baek Joon's best friend who is a flight attendant.

- Jeon Bae-soo as Baek Joon's father.
- Hwang Young-hee as Baek Joon's mother.

People around Je-hoon

- Choi Gyu-hwan as Hwang Myeong-soo

A prosecutor at the Seoul Central Court.

- Lee Han-wi as Kwon Choon-sub

Je-hoon's father.

- Kim Ki-doo as Chief Yang

Jae-hoon's co-worker.

Others

- Choi Dae-chul as Lee Tae-kyung

Baek Joon's colleague at the construction company.

- Seo Hyun-chul as Kim Ki-sub

Baek Joon's colleague at the construction company.

- Hwang Jung-min as An Mi-yeon

Baek Joon's colleague at the construction company.

- Kang Young-seok as Jang Cheol-min

A policeman involved in arresting Byun Hyuk, who later becomes his neighbour by coincidence. He becomes Yeon-hee's boyfriend.

- Kim Seung-wook as Sul Gi-hwan

An employee of Byun Group, who was a friend of Baek Joon's father.

- Song Young-kyu as CEO Min
- Yoon Jeong-hyuk as General Manager Han
- Lee Myung-hoon as Byun Hyuk's friend

=== Special appearance ===
- Lee Yoon-ji as the hotel manager (eps. 1–2)

== Production ==
Revolutionary Love is produced by Samhwa Networks and created by Studio Dragon and Kang Eun-kyung's creative group Plot Line (글Line). The first table script reading of the cast took place on September 10, 2017. The series also marks Choi Si-won's first acting project after his military service.

== Original soundtrack ==
Revolutionary Love Original soundtrack

Soundtrack album by Various Artists
- Recorded: 2017
- Genre: Soundtrack
- Languages: Korean; English
- Label: CJ E&M Music

=== Part 1 ===
No.	Title	Lyrics	Music	Artist	Length
1.	"Between Strange Romance" (이상한 연애 사이)	LeeOn	LeeOn; Mirja Lakso	Cheon Dan-bi	3:12
2.	"Between Strange Romance" (Inst.)		LeeOn; Mirja Lakso		3:12
Total length:					6:24

=== Part 2 ===
No.	Title	Lyrics	Music	Artist	Length
1.	"Love U"	Park Woo-sang; Han Jae-hwan	Park Woo-sang; Han Jae-hwan	Younha	3:27
2.	"Love U" (Inst.)		Park Woo-sang; Han Jae-hwan		3:27
Total length:					6:54

=== Part 3 ===
No.	Title	Lyrics	Music	Artist	Length
1.	"Go Ready Go"	Uhm Ki-yeom; Lee Young-joo	Park Woo-sang; Shape	Dawon (Cosmic Girls)	3:41
2.	"Go Ready Go" (Inst.)		Park Woo-sang; Shape		3:41
Total length:					7:22

=== Part 4 ===
No.	Title	Lyrics	Music	Artist	Length
1.	"Sing My Song"	Gustav Karlstrom	Gustav Karlstrom; Leif Sundin; Jo Michelle	Goo Keun-byul	3:37
2.	"Sing My Song" (Inst.)		Gustav Karlstrom; Leif Sundin; Jo Michelle		3:37
Total length:					7:14

=== Part 5 ===
No.	Title	Lyrics	Music	Artist	Length
1.	"My Way" (내 멋대로)	Kim Won	Kim Won	Yeontae (IN2IT)	4:21
2.	"My Way" (Inst.)		Kim Won		4:21
Total length:					8:42

== Ratings ==
Ep.	Original broadcast date	Average audience share		
Ep.	Original broadcast date	Nielsen Korea		TNmS
Ep.	Original broadcast date	Nationwide	Seoul	Nationwide
1	October 14, 2017	2.501%	2.698%	2.2%
2	October 15, 2017	3.533%	3.485%	4.0%†
3	October 21, 2017	2.762%	2.970%	3.2%
4	October 22, 2017	3.796%†	3.683%†	3.4%
5	October 28, 2017	3.032%	2.736%	2.3%
6	October 29, 2017	3.676%	3.466%	2.8%
7	November 4, 2017	2.792%	2.724%	2.8%
8	November 5, 2017	2.494%	2.274%	2.8%
9	November 11, 2017	2.792%	2.637%	2.3%
10	November 12, 2017	2.637%	2.692%	2.0%
11	November 18, 2017	2.690%	2.547%	1.8%
12	November 19, 2017	2.854%	2.692%	2.4%
13	November 25, 2017	2.729%	2.382%	2.0%
14	November 26, 2017	2.568%	2.670%	1.8%
15	December 2, 2017	2.418%⁂	2.263%⁂	1.6%⁂
16	December 3, 2017	3.306%	3.257%	2.1%
Average		2.911%	2.864%	2.5%
In the table above, the blue numbers with an asterism (⁂) represent the lowest ratings and the red numbers with a dagger (†) represent the highest ratings.; This series aired on a cable channel/pay TV which normally has a relatively smaller audience compared to free-to-air TV/public broadcasters (KBS, SBS, MBC and EBS).
