= UNICEF East Asia and Pacific Regional Office =

UNICEF EAPRO
- Abbreviation: UNICEF EAPRO
- Formation: 1948
- Type: Regional office
- Legal status: Active
- Headquarters: Bangkok, Thailand
- Head: Debora Comini (Regional Director)
- Parent organization: UNICEF (the United Nations)
- Website: http://www.unicef.org/eapro

The UNICEF East Asia and Pacific Regional Office, also known as UNICEF EAPRO, is one of seven regional offices that support the work of the United Nations Children's Fund. Globally, UNICEF works to promote children's rights in over 150 developing countries.

The East Asia and Pacific Regional Office, based in Bangkok, Thailand, provides advice and programme support to 14 UNICEF Country Offices and other humanitarian partners across the region. It also supports these offices in their efforts to raise funds for UNICEF initiatives for children.

Helping to develop and guide UNICEF programmes across the region in health and nutrition, child protection, HIV and AIDS, education, water and sanitation, early childhood development, social policy, and emergency preparedness is a central function for specialist advisers in EAPRO.

UNICEF EAPRO also coordinates region-wide initiatives and advocates at the regional level for the realization of children's rights through greater investment in children and child-centred social policies. It works closely with a range of partner organizations on children's issues, including several other UN agencies, civil society groups, bilateral and multilateral institutions, and donors.

Strengthening regional partnerships for achieving the Sustainable Development Goals (SDGs) and realizing the rights of children defined in the Convention on the Rights of the Child are central parts of EAPRO's current agenda.

Internationally, UNICEF works with governments, civil society organizations, business partners and local communities to improve children's lives. While the organization is present in 190 countries worldwide, its focus is very much in developing countries where over 85 per cent of UNICEF staff work. It has a major role in responding to emergencies, including natural disasters and conflicts.

Rather than relying on UN funding, UNICEF generates its own revenue through voluntary donations. UNICEF Country Offices throughout East Asia and the Pacific raise funds for their programmes through a range of means, including donations, the sale of cards and gifts, and strategic partnerships with companies.

In the region, UNICEF National Committees in Australia, Hong Kong, Japan, New Zealand and the Republic of Korea raise funds for the organization's worldwide emergency and development work.

== East Asia and the Pacific region ==
One third of the world's population, or around two billion people, live in the East Asia and Pacific region This includes over one quarter (about 27 per cent) of the world's children - around 580 million in total. Around 30 million children are born in East Asia and the Pacific every year. The region stretches from Western China to the Cook Islands, and from Mongolia in the north to Tonga in the south. The smallest country in the region, Niue, has as few as 1,700 people; whereas China, the region's largest country, has 1.3 billion people.

The region is marked by considerable diversity in peoples, cultures, natural environments, economies, political systems and development potential. While featuring some of the fastest-growing economies in the world, the region also includes nine of the world's least-developed countries - five in the Pacific (Kiribati, Samoa, Solomon Islands, Tuvalu and Vanuatu) and four in East Asia (Cambodia, Lao PDR, Myanmar and Timor Leste). The Pacific, with its particular characteristics, dynamics and challenges, is a distinct sub-region within the wider EAP region.

UNICEF's 14 Country Offices design and implement programmes, with EAPRO's support, to advance the rights and well-being of children in 28 countries and territories across East Asia and the Pacific: Brunei Darussalam, Cambodia, China, Cook Islands, Fiji, Indonesia, Kiribati, Korea DPR, Laos PDR, Malaysia, Marshall Islands, Micronesia, Mongolia, Myanmar, Nauru, Niue, Palau, Papua New Guinea, Philippines, Samoa, Solomon Islands, Thailand, Timor Leste, Tokelau, Tonga, Tuvalu, Vanuatu and Viet Nam.

== Convention of the Rights of the Child ==
All of the countries in East Asia and the Pacific have ratified the 1989 United Nations Convention on the Rights of the Child, a comprehensive human rights treaty which requires State Parties to make the world safer, healthier and more respectful of children's rights. The Convention sets out universal principles and standards for the status and treatment of children across the globe, and ensures that the specific rights outlined in the body of the Convention have the status of international law.

UNICEF, as the UN body responsible for children's rights under the convention, is required to promote its effective implementation and to encourage international cooperation in support of children. UNICEF is also represented when the UN Committee on the Rights of the Child considers each country's implementation of the Convention every five years.

== Emergency response ==
The Asia-Pacific region is, statistically, the world's most vulnerable region to natural disasters, including those related to climate change. These disasters often impact most heavily on children. UNICEF's primary goal, when established in 1946, was to provide humanitarian assistance to children affected by the Second World War. The organization continues to provide assistance to children affected by conflict and natural disasters and works to promote the long-term rehabilitation of affected communities to improve conditions for children.

== UNICEF programmes in East Asia and the Pacific ==
UNICEF's priority areas of work in East Asia and the Pacific include education for all, child survival and development, HIV and AIDS and child protection.

== Education ==
Early childhood development, adolescent education, gender equality and education quality are the focus of UNICEF's education work in the region. UNICEF works to provide opportunities for all children to obtain a quality education, and to provide equal learning opportunities for boys and girls. Serious disparities remain across East Asia and the Pacific, with children from many poor and marginalized groups unable to receive a quality education – or any education at all. A regional strategy on adolescent education, begun in 2009, seeks to provide adolescents who have yet to complete lower secondary school with basic livelihood, life skills and practical vocational training.

== Young child survival and development ==
Child survival is a core area of work for UNICEF in East Asia and the Pacific. UNICEF, in seeking to improve maternal and neo-natal outcomes, is working with regional governments and other partners to improve the efficiency of health systems and their delivery vital services for women and children. On nutrition, UNICEF is seeking to scale up programmes, such as exclusive breastfeeding and appropriate micronutrient supplements, that have a proven impact. Expanding access to clean drinking water and upgraded sanitation, and promoting better hygiene in schools, are other UNICEF priorities. UNICEF is also working in the region to increase access to vaccinations to reduce child deaths from preventable diseases.

== HIV and AIDS ==
Through technical advice, advocacy and funding, UNICEF works to strengthen national and regional responses to the HIV epidemic for the benefit of children. An estimated 2.4 million people in East Asia and the Pacific are living with HIV, including about 28,000 children, with Cambodia, Thailand, Myanmar and Papua New Guinea the countries most affected. Preventing parent-to-child transmission (the source of 90 per cent of child infections), paediatric treatment, protection and prevention – known as the ‘Four Ps’ - are the focus of UNICEF's response to the HIV epidemic.

== Child protection ==
UNICEF works to protect children from exploitation – a right enshrined in the Convention on the Rights of the Child – including all forms of violence and abuse. Trafficking; sexual exploitation; violence, abuse and neglect; child labour; recruitment as child soldiers; institutionalization; and unlawful detention are among the most common violations against children in the region. To protect children from these violations, UNICEF works with regional governments to develop comprehensive national child protection systems, much like the education and health systems that countries established decades ago. A national child protection system is supported by institutions, laws and policies that articulate when and how instances of child abuse, neglect, exploitation and violence will be addressed. The social welfare and justice systems work in concert to assist and protect a child from harm, deliver preventative services by identifying and helping children and families at risk as well as provide support services to all families.

== See also ==
- UNICEF Philippines
- UN Convention on the Rights of the Child
