= The Beauty Inside (TV series) =

2018 South Korean TV series

- Promotional poster
- Hangul: 뷰티 인사이드
- RR: Byuti insaideu
- MR: Pyut'i insaidŭ
- Genre: Fantasy; Melodrama; Romantic-comedy
- Created by: JTBC
- Based on: The Beauty Inside (film) by Kim Sun-jung and Noh Kyung-hee
- Written by: Im Mea-ri
- Directed by: Song Hyun-wook
- Starring: Seo Hyun-jin; Lee Min-ki; Lee Da-hee; Ahn Jae-hyun
- Music by: Um Ki-yeop
- Country of origin: South Korea
- Original language: Korean
- No. of episodes: 16

Production
- Executive producers: Jang Kyung-ik; Kim Woo-taek; Syd Lim
- Running time: 60 minutes
- Production companies: Studio&NEW; Yong Film

Original release
- Network: JTBC
- Release: October 1 – November 20, 2018

The Beauty Inside (Korean: 뷰티 인사이드) is a 2018 South Korean television series starring Seo Hyun-jin, Lee Min-ki, Lee Da-hee and Ahn Jae-hyun. Based on the 2015 film of the same title, it aired on JTBC from October 1 to November 20, 2018.

== Synopsis ==
Han Se-gye is an A-list actress who is a troublemaker and the object of many rumors. Her life is a mystery, but in reality, she suffers from an unusual phenomenon. At a certain point every month, her appearance changes to a different person. Seo Do-jae, who is an executive director of an airline company, seems to be perfect, attractive and intelligent, but in reality, he is actually suffering from prosopagnosia. The two eventually fall in love.

== Cast ==
=== Main ===
- Seo Hyun-jin as Han Se-gye

A top actress who is the subject of numerous rumors, especially because she occasionally suddenly disappears from public view. Every month she transforms into someone else for a week (e.g., old lady, young boy, Caucasian lady etc.) Only a few people know her secret and they do their best to cover for her. The model for T Road Airline, she has a connection with Do-jae which she is unaware of.

- Lee Min-ki as Seo Do-jae

The director of an T Road Air company, who has face blindness after his brain was injured in an accident. He hides his disorder from the world, and remembers people's habits and appearance to recognize them. He has a connection with Se-gye which he is unaware of.

- Lee Da-hee as Kang Sa-ra

Seo Do-jae's step-sister, who bickers with him to hide her inferiority for not being the biological daughter of Sunho Group. She owns One Air, Seo Do-jae's rival in business whom she aspires to surpass. She eventually falls in love with Ryu Eun-ho.

- Ahn Jae-hyun as Ryu Eun-ho

A prospective priest known for his peaceful and calm nature. He protects Han Se-gye's secret as her close friend. He changes his dream because of Sa-ra.

=== Supporting ===
People around Han Se-gye

- Moon Ji-in as Yoo Woo-mi

Han Se-gye's manager and close friend who knows her secret.

- Kim Hee-jung as Han Sook-hee

Han Se-gye's mother.

- Ryu Hwa-young as Chae Yoo-ri

An actress and Han Se-gye's rival who tries her best to bring her down.

People around Seo Do-jae

- Lee Tae-ri as Jung Joo-hwan

Seo Do-jae's secretary. He is sarcastic and straightforward, but is unwaveringly loyal to Seo Do-jae. He is one of the few people who know about Seo Do-jae's illness.

- Na Young-hee as Im Jung-yeon

Seo Do-jae's mother and Kang Sa-ra's stepmother.

- Lee Moon-soo as The President Im

Seo Do-jae's grandfather and Im Jung-yeon's father. He thinks Do-jae is incompetent and incapable, unaware of his illness.

People around Ryu Eun-ho

- Lee Han-wi as Ryu Eun-ho's father
- Kim Ye-ryeong as Ryu Eun-ho's mother

She is strongly against Eun-ho becoming a priest but eventually accepts.

- Oh Yoo-jin as Ryu Ah-ram

Ryu Eun-ho's younger sister.

Others

- Kang Nam-gil as Kang Dae-sik

A professor who is married to Im Jung-yeon, and Kang Sa-ra's father.

- Lee Jung-hyuk as Yoon-ha
- Lee Ga-ryeong as an actress
- Moon Sook as Woo-jin's mother
- Kim Seung-wook as Lee Hee-sub
- Lee Cheol-min as Director Kim
- Kang In-seo
- Oh Se-young as Joo Ga-young

=== Special appearances ===
- Kang So-ra as herself (ep. 1)
- Ye Ji-won as herself (ep. 1)
- Lee Jae-yoon as himself (eps. 1, 4)
- Ha Si-eun as herself (ep. 1)
- Kim Jun-hyun as Han Se-gye (ep. 1)
- Son Sook as Han Se-gye (ep 1)
- Kim Ki-doo as a doctor (ep. 1)
- Choi Dae-chul as a donor (ep. 1)
- Kim Sung-ryung as Han Se-gye (eps. 1, 2)
- Ko Kyu-pil as Han Se-gye (eps. 1, 2)
- Kim Min-seok as Han Se-gye (eps. 5, 6)
- Moon Woo-jin as Han Se-gye (eps. 8, 9)
- Ra Mi-ran as Han Se-gye (ep. 10)
- Heo Young-ji as Han Se-gye's fan (ep. 13)
- Jeon Hye-bin as Han Se-gye (ep. 16)

== Production ==
First script reading took place on July 22, 2018.

== Original soundtrack ==
The Beauty Inside OST

Soundtrack album by Various artists
- Released: 2018
- Genre: Soundtrack
- Languages: Korean; English
- Labels: MUSIC&NEW, STUDIO&NEW

=== Part 1 ===
Released on October 1, 2018
No.	Title	Lyrics	Music	Artist	Length
1.	"Cloud" (구름)	Park Woo-sang	Park Woo-sang, Han Jae-wan	Rothy	03:04
2.	"Cloud" (Inst.)		Park Woo-sang, Han Jae-wan		03:04
Total length:					06:08

=== Part 2 ===
Released on October 9, 2018
No.	Title	Lyrics	Music	Artist	Length
1.	"The Beauty Inside (With 2morro)"	Uhm Gi-yeob	Uhm Gi-yeob	VINCENT	03:14
2.	"The Beauty Inside (With 2morro)" (Inst.)		Uhm Gi-yeob		03:14
Total length:					06:28

=== Part 3 ===
Released on October 16, 2018
No.	Title	Lyrics	Music	Artist	Length
1.	"Falling In Love" (꿈처럼 내린)	Hana	Kim Young-sung	Davichi	03:46
2.	"Falling In Love" (Inst.)		Kim Young-sung		03:46
Total length:					07:32

=== Part 4 ===
Released on October 23, 2018
No.	Title	Lyrics	Music	Artist	Length
1.	"Beautiful Moment" (내 생에 아름다운)	Hana	Jin Min-ho	K.Will	04:01
2.	"Beautiful Moment" (Inst.)		Jin Min-ho		04:01
Total length:					08:02

=== Part 5 ===
Released on October 23, 2018
No.	Title	Lyrics	Music	Artist	Length
1.	"The Love Inside"	Uhm Gi-yeob	Uhm Gi-yeob	2morro	03:18
2.	"The Love Inside" (Inst.)		Uhm Gi-yeob		03:18
Total length:					06:36

=== Part 6 ===
Released on November 6, 2018
No.	Title	Lyrics	Music	Artist	Length
1.	"Goodbye"	Kim Chang-rak, Han Kyung-soo, Choi Han-sol	Han Kyung-soo, Choi Han-sol, Kim Chang-rak	Wendy (Red Velvet)	03:15
2.	"Goodbye" (Inst.)		Han Kyung-soo, Choi Han-sol, Kim Chang-rak		03:15
Total length:					06:30

=== Part 7 ===
Released on November 12, 2018
No.	Title	Lyrics	Artist	Length
1.	"Run"	2morro	2morro	02:55
2.	"Run" (inst.)			02:55
Total length:				5:00

Disc 2:
No.	Title	Artist	Length
1.	"Beauty Inside" (Opening Theme)	Various Artists	2:59
2.	"Celeb Couple"	Various Artists	1:37
3.	"Doowap"	Various Artists	1:45
4.	"Hit on"	Various Artists	1:53
5.	"Oh Ma Na Ye!"	Various Artists	1:45
6.	"Oh no!"	Various Artists	1:49
7.	"Only you"	Various Artists	3:37
8.	"On the road"	Various Artists	2:36
9.	"'LUV' Etude no. 1 (2morro ver.)"	Various Artists	5:09
10.	"'LUV' Etude no. 2 (Ukulele ver.)"	Various Artists	2:45
11.	"Stop it"	Various Artists	1:35
12.	"Zza Zza Com mi Zza Zza Zza"	Various Artists	2:26

== Viewership ==
The Beauty Inside : South Korea viewers per episode (thousands)

Season	Episode number																Average
Season	1	2	3	4	5	6	7	8	9	10	11	12	13	14	15	16	Average
1	700	652	918	1088	1027	1175	1221	1226	1057	938	1035	1166	1138	1326	1460	1355	1093

Source: Audience measurement performed nationwide by Nielsen Media Research.

Average TV viewership ratings
Ep.	Original broadcast date	Average audience share	
Ep.	Original broadcast date	AGB Nielsen	
Ep.	Original broadcast date	Nationwide	Seoul
1	October 1, 2018	2.882%	3.068%
2	October 2, 2018	2.827%	3.236%
3	October 8, 2018	3.479%	3.925%
4	October 9, 2018	4.331%	4.405%
5	October 15, 2018	3.868%	3.941%
6	October 16, 2018	4.437%	4.245%
7	October 22, 2018	4.296%	4.054%
8	October 23, 2018	4.281%	4.352%
9	October 29, 2018	3.814%	4.037%
10	October 30, 2018	3.552%	3.526%
11	November 5, 2018	4.147%	4.857%
12	November 6, 2018	4.759%	5.352%
13	November 12, 2018	4.689%	5.214%
14	November 13, 2018	5.317%	6.063%
15	November 19, 2018	5.209%	6.132%
16	November 20, 2018	5.181%	5.680%
Average		4.192%	4.505%
In the table above, the blue numbers represent the lowest ratings and the red numbers represent the highest ratings.; This drama aired on a cable channel/pay TV which normally has a relatively smaller audience compared to free-to-air TV/public broadcasters (KBS, SBS, MBC and EBS).

== Awards and nominations ==
Year	Award	Category	Recipient	Result	Ref.
2019	14th Seoul International Drama Awards	Outstanding in Korean Drama OST	"Falling In Love" (by Davichi)	Won	
2019	14th Seoul International Drama Awards	Best K-drama of 2018	Top the boards exceeding Strong Girl Bong-soon	Won	
