= Billie Jean, Look at Me (soundtrack) =

Soundtrack album
- Released: January 24, 2007
- Genres: K-pop, R&B, rock
- Language: Korean
- Label: SM Entertainment
- Producer: Lee Soo-man

Billie Jean, Look At Me is the name of the soundtrack for the 2007 Korean drama Billie Jean, Look at Me starring Lee Ji-hoon and Park Hee-von.

Track 2 by Super Junior-K.R.Y. can also be found in SM Town's winter vacation album 2006 WINTER SMTOWN – Snow Dream.

== Track listing ==
1. Angels – Sunday The Grace (Rock Version)
2. 그것뿐이에요 (It's Just That) – Super Junior-K.R.Y.
3. Dreaming – Lee Ji-hoon
4. Out of Sight, Out of Mind – Dana
5. Angels – TRAX (Ballad Version)
6. Angels – Instrumental (Rock Version)
7. 영국 빌라 (English Villa)
8. 음흉한 방희씨 (Insidious Bang-hee)
9. 암흑가의 아저씨들 (Men of the Underworld) – Tango Version
10. 달려라 빌리 (Run, Billy)
11. 싸움의 법칙 (Rules of Fighting)
12. Joyful Dayz? (Don't Let Me Down)
13. 괴짜 방희 (Eccentric Bang-hee)
14. Walkin' With Billy (Ragtime)
15. Fury of Billy
16. 늘 하고 싶던 이야기 (The Story I Always Wanted to Tell)
17. 재미있는 이야기 (Fun Story)
18. 나와 함께 춤을 (Your Dance with Me)
19. 아름다운 방희 (Beautiful Bang-hee)
20. STRANGE MUSIC 1 & 2
