= Sangmyung University =

University in Seoul, South Korea

Coordinates: 36.833°N 127.179°E

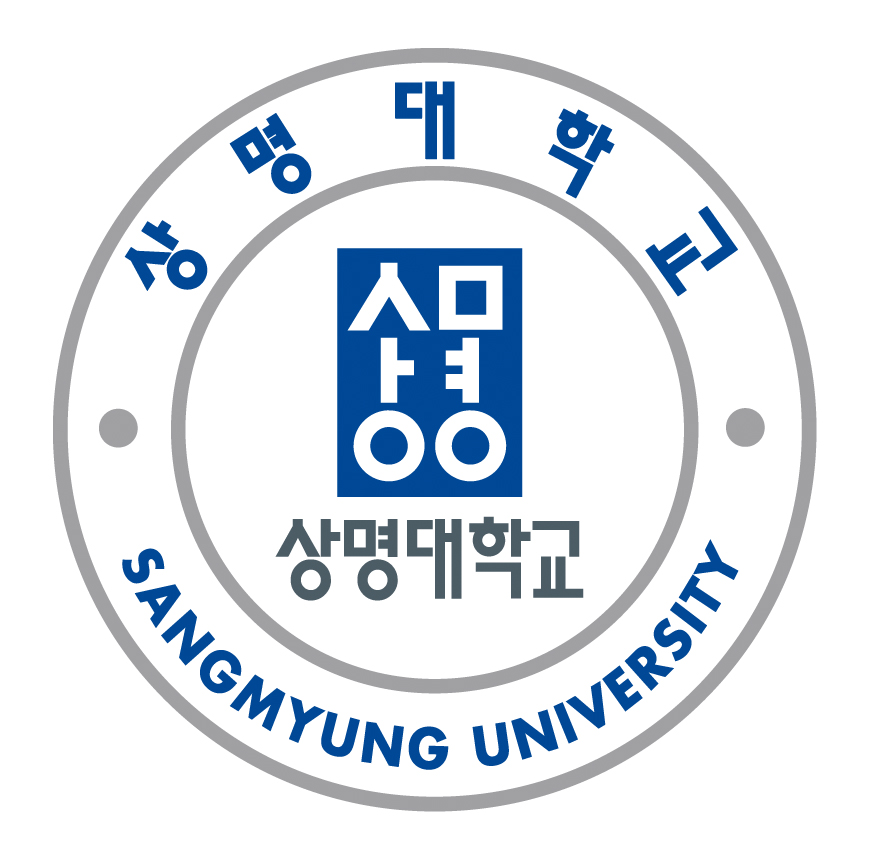
- Established: 1937; 89 years ago
- President: Kim Jong-hee (김종희)
- Location: (South Korea) Seoul Campus Jongno District, Seoul; Cheonan Campus Cheonan, South Chungcheong Province, South Korea
- Nicknames: SMU, Center of Seoul, Deer University

Korean name
- Hangul: 상명대학교
- Hanja: 祥明大學校
- RR: Sangmyeong daehakgyo
- MR: Sangmyŏng taehakkyo

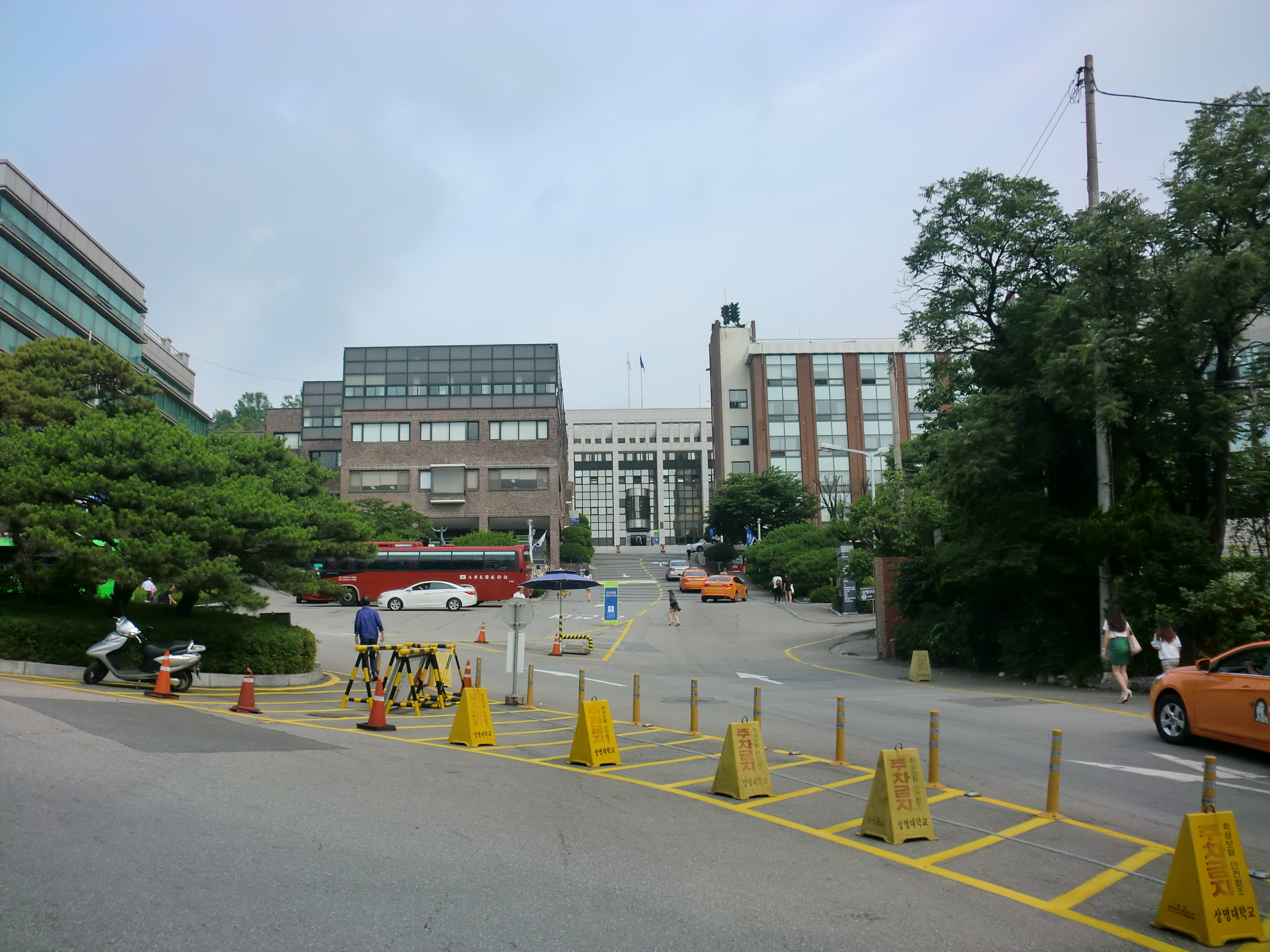
Sangmyung University 3

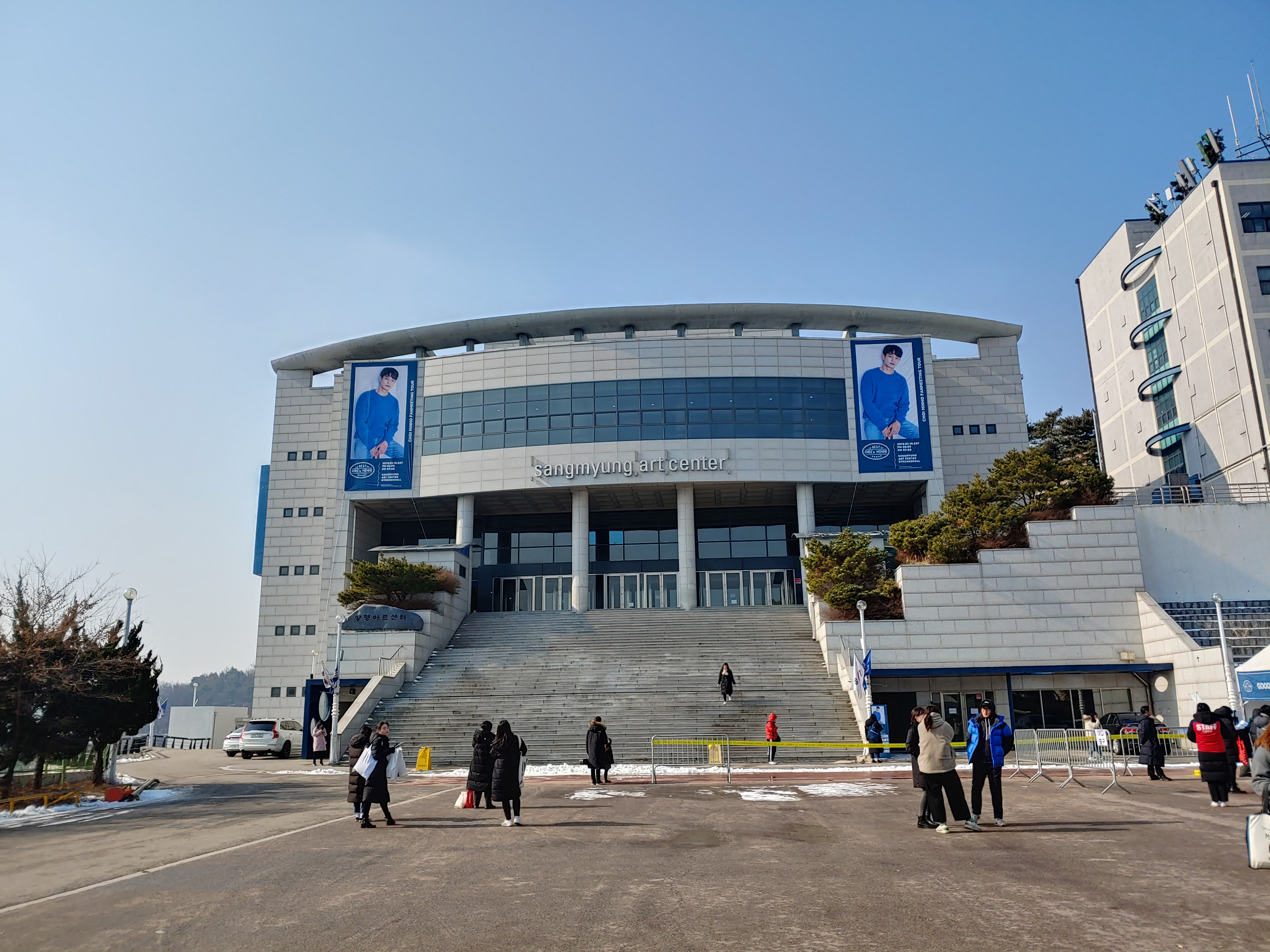
Sangmyung art center

Sangmyung University (Korean: 상명대학교) is a private university in South Korea with the main campus in Jongno, Seoul, and an auxiliary campus in Cheonan, Chungcheongnam-do. It was established in 1937, with the Sangmyung Women's College being founded in 1965, and the Sangmyung Women's College in Cheonan in 1985. In 1987, the college was promoted to a university and changed its name to Sangmyung Women's University. In 1996, it changed into coeducation and changed its name to Sangmyung University.

== Location ==
Sangmyung University is located in Jongno, Seoul and Cheonan, Chungcheongnam-do. Jongno District is famous for origin of Seoul.

== History ==
The university traces its beginnings to 1937 during the Japanese colonial era. It was in this year that the Sangmyung Academy for Higher Learning for the Young was established.

By 1965, the academy became a women's teachers' college and then a women's university in 1986. Ten years later, Sangmyung Women's University began to admit men. Library occupancy rates and graduate employment rates have increased since 1996. Male alumni have been largely responsible for the surge in alumni activities since Sangmyung went co-educational with the assistance of Kyoungsun Im.

== Notable alumni ==
- Bae Seul-ki
- Cho Youjeen (Cherry Filter)
- Choi Won-young
- Go Soo
- Hwang Sun-hee
- Im Ji-eun
- Kang Dong-won
- Kil Yong-woo
- Kim Dong Wan (Shinhwa)
- Kim Eun-jung (Jewelry)
- Kim Jaewon
- Kim Kkot-bi
- Kim Won-jun
- Kim Yo-han (X1 / WEi)
- Kwon So-hyun
- Lee Seul-bi
- Son Ji-hyun (4Minute)
- Oh Hyun Jun (M.Pire)
- Oh Seungah (Rainbow)
- Park Bo-gum
- Park Joo-yeon
- Park Se-young
- Park Sol-mi
- Shin Da-eun
- Son Tae-young
- Yeon Sang-ho
- Jang Seung-jo
