= Kim Yoon-seo =

South Korean actress (born 1986)

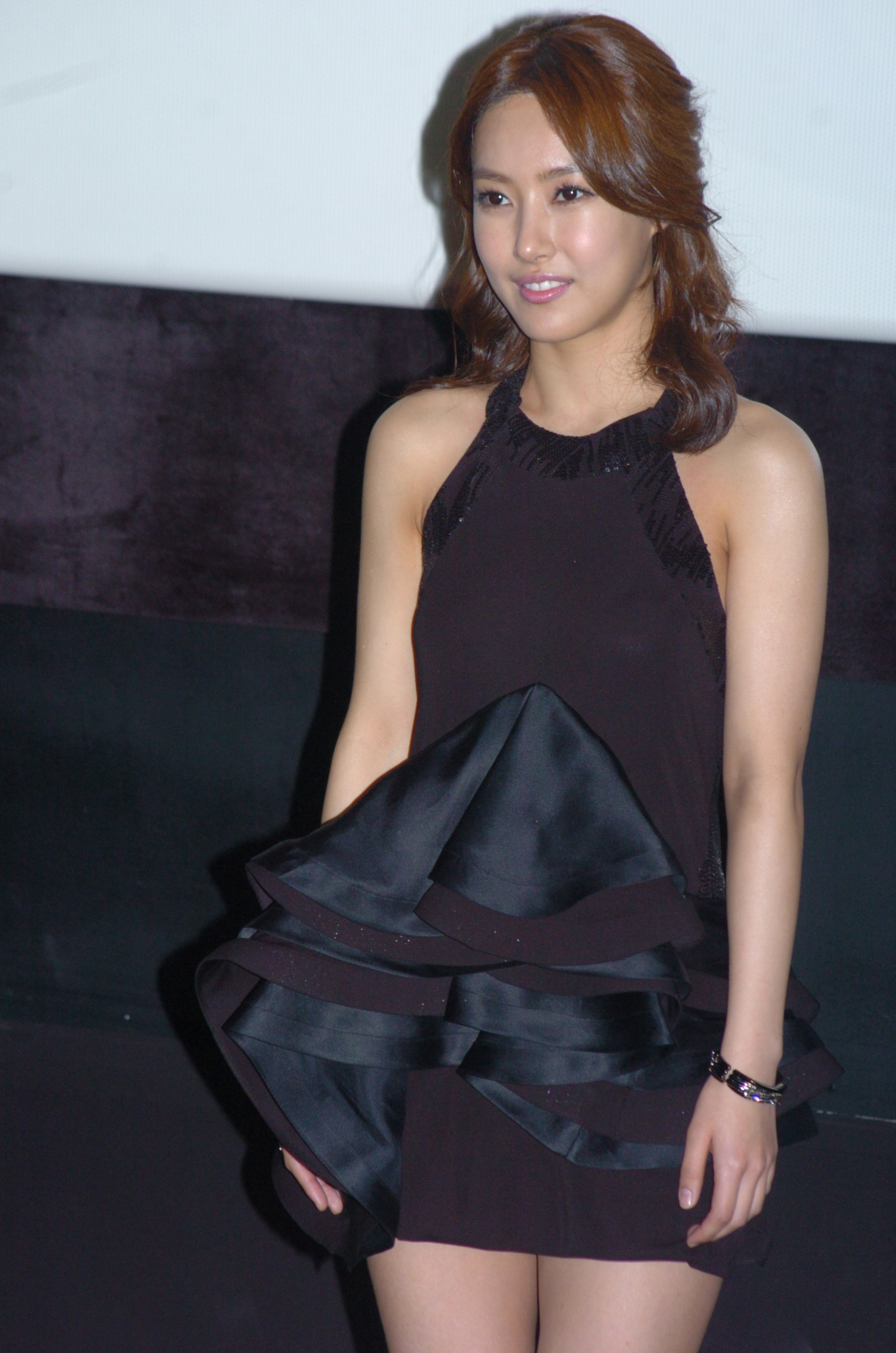
- Kim in 2012
- Born: Kim Ga-eun; March 28, 1986 (age 40); Seoul, South Korea
- Education: Dankook University - Architectural Engineering
- Occupation: Actress
- Years active: 2009–present
- Agent: SBD Entertainment

Korean name
- Hangul: 김윤서
- RR: Gim Yunseo
- MR: Kim Yunsŏ

Birth name
- Hangul: 김가은
- RR: Gim Gaeun
- MR: Kim Kaŭn

Kim Yoon-seo (Korean: 김윤서; born March 28, 1986), birth name Kim Ga-eun, is a South Korean actress.

== Career ==
Kim made her acting debut in 2009, and has played supporting roles in television dramas such as Glass Mask (2012), You Are the Best! (2013) and 4 Legendary Witches (2014).

In October 2022, Kim signed with new agency SBD Entertainment.

== Filmography ==
=== Film ===
Year	Title	Role	Notes/Ref.
2010	I Saw the Devil	Jang Se-yeon	
2010	Bang!	Yoon-seo	short film
2011	Late Blossom	Kim Yeon-ah	

=== Television series ===
Year	Title	Role	Notes/Ref.
2009	My Hero	Mi-rae	
2011	The Duo	Damo	
2011	Living in Style	Jo Shin-ae	
2011	Poseidon	Hong Ji-ah	
2012	Late Blossom	Kim Yeon-ah	
2012	A Gentleman's Dignity	Kim Eun-ji	
2012	Glass Mask	Kang Seo-yeon	
2013	You Are the Best!	Choi Yeon-ah	
2013	Passionate Love	Ban Dal	
2014	A New Leaf	Jung Hye-ryeong	
2014	4 Legendary Witches	Ma Joo-hee	
2015	This Is My Love	Park Hyun-ah	
2015	The Virtual Bride	Kim Se-mi	
2016	Secrets of Women	Chae Seo-rim / Hung Shin-buk	
2022	Desire	Hyun Seung-ji	
2022	Doctor Lawyer	Jung Yun-jeong	
2022	Why Her	Im Seung-yeon	
2022	Drama Stage: "Don't Announce Your Husband's Death"	Seo Do-yeon	one act-drama

=== Web series ===
Year	Title	Role	Ref.
2022	Remarriage & Desires	Heo Jung-in	
2022	Love in Blue	Resource Hwa	

=== Music video appearances ===
Year	Song title	Artist
2016	"Bwisagu Bwisagu"	Bijay Narzary
