= You Are the Best! =

2013 South Korean television series

- Promotional poster
- Also known as: You're the Best! Lee Soon-shin is the Best; You're the Best, Lee Soon-shin
- Hangul: 최고다 이순신
- Hanja: 最高다 이순신
- Lit.: The Best Lee Soon-shin
- RR: Choegoda I Sunsin
- MR: Ch'oegoda I Sunsin
- Genre: Romance; Family; Melodrama; Comedy
- Written by: Jung Yoo-kyung
- Directed by: Yoon Sung-sik
- Starring: Lee Ji-eun; Jo Jung-suk; Go Doo-shim; Lee Mi-sook
- Composer: Kang Dong-yoon
- Country of origin: South Korea
- Original language: Korean
- No. of seasons: 1
- No. of episodes: 50

Production
- Executive producer: Bae Kyung-soo
- Producer: Mo Wan-il
- Cinematography: Kim Jang-soo
- Editor: Lee Jung-hoon
- Running time: 80 minutes Saturdays and Sundays at 19:55 (KST)
- Production company: AStory

Original release
- Network: KBS2
- Release: March 9 – August 25, 2013

You Are the Best!, known in South Korea as The Best Lee Soon-shin (Korean: 최고다 이순신) is a 2013 South Korean television series starring Lee Ji-eun, Jo Jung-suk, Go Doo-shim and Lee Mi-sook. It aired on KBS2 from March 9 to August 25, 2013, at 19:55 (KST) on Saturdays and Sundays for 50 episodes. The drama is about a family, devastated after the sudden death of the father, that learns the true meaning of love and happiness. The show incorporates themes of self-discovery and reconciliation.

== Synopsis ==
Kim Jung-ae (Go Doo-shim) lovingly raised Lee Soon-shin (IU) as her own daughter after her husband brought the baby home, saying that he found her alone at a bus stop. Soon-shin is a member of the "880,000 won generation", college graduates who cannot find a job and work instead in low-paying temp jobs. She becomes targeted by a swindler who claims he is Shin Joon-ho, head of a talent agency. He targets her by saying he believes that she has the potential to become an actress. After quickly signing a contract, Soon-shin discovers that she has been conned and ends up being charged the amount of money Shin Joon-ho stole from her. Shortly after this, her father, Chang-hoon (Jung Dong-hwan) dies in a car accident. The suspect is unknown, and there are no witnesses. Meanwhile, Soon-shin begins working at Black Smith, the restaurant below the Gabi Entertainment office, in order to pay off her debt. After making a bet with actress, and ex-girlfriend, Choi Yeon-ah (Kim Yoon-seo), the real Joon-ho (Jo Jung-suk), over-confident and arrogant, is determined to transform Soon-shin into a star. However, Jung-ae does not support Soon-shin taking the offer after finding out that her late husband may have an affair with another woman, who later gave birth to Soon-shin. She later discovers that Soon-shin's birth mother is the famous actress Song Mi-ryung (Lee Mi-sook).

Middle daughter Lee Yoo-shin (Yoo In-na) has lived next door to Park Chan-woo (Go Joo-won) since childhood. Despite their constant squabbles, Chan-woo, now a dermatologist, still loves her confidence and prickly demeanor. Yoo-shin avoids thinking about marriage and childbirth, instead making success at work her main priority. When Joon-ho's younger sister Shin Yi-jung (Bae Geu-rin) develops a crush on Chan-woo, Yoo-shin realizes her true feelings for him.

Eldest daughter Lee Hye-shin (Son Tae-young) is beautiful and competent, but feels like a failure when her marriage ends. As a single mother, she has difficulties re-entering the workforce. She later meets Seo Jin-wook (Jung Woo), a neighborhood baker, who shows her consideration and gentleness and helps heal her wounds.

Meanwhile, Soon-shin has no idea that she was adopted. She continues to take acting lessons from Mi-ryung, which upsets her family. They have difficult understanding why Chang-hoon would be unfaithful. Watching Soon-shin do everything to realize her dream of becoming an actress, Joon-ho looks back on his career and finds himself changing as he discovers the true meaning of success. When Mi-ryung later discovers that Soon-shin is Chang-hoon's daughter, she immediately tries to destroy her career. Mi-ryung also informs her that she was merely a pawn in Joon-ho's bet, upsetting Soon-shin who decides to quit. Unwilling to admit his romantic feelings for her, but genuinely concerned for her welfare, Joon-ho is determined make Soon-shin return to acting, which she once said made her happy. After she rejoins Gabi Entertainment, Soon-shin also realizes that she likes Joon-ho and they begin dating.

After breaking off their mentoring relationship, Soon-shin eventually finds out that Mi-ryung is her birth mother. Despite facing difficulty with her family, she refuses to live with her. Soon-shin only agrees to stay at Mi-ryung's house to keep reporters away from them. Upset at Soon-shin's coldness, Mi-ryung tells Soon-shin that Chang-hoon is not her birth father, so she has no reason to go back to her adoptive family. Soon-shin keeps her paternity a secret from her family and lives with Mi-ryung while she and Joon-ho work on her acting debut.

Upon witnessing firsthand Mi-ryung's pitiful and lonely life, Soon-shin starts showing kindness to her birth mother. Mi-ryung values the relationship she's building with Soon-shin and is determined that nothing will ruin it. As Soon-shin overhears in a conversation that her father Chang-hoon died while saving Mi-ryung, she runs away and Jung-ae takes her home. Soon-shin tells Mi-ryung that if she wants her forgiveness, she must beg her family for it, and help find the suspect by coming forward as a witness. Mi-ryung refuses to do it, saying that fame is all she has. When Mi-ryung tells Shin Dong-hyuk, Joon-ho's father, to take his car's black box to the police since it recorded what happened the night of the accident. Both Mi-ryung and Soon-shin's careers are jeopardized after the news goes public.

Mi-ryung eventually tells the press the truth in order to take responsibility and retires from acting. The hit and run driver is arrested and jailed. As the drama closes, Mi-ryung is living a peaceful life in a remote area. After Mi-ryung watches Soon-shin's new stage play, she makes a tentative gesture of reconciliation by thanking her and calling her "Mom" for the first time. Hye-shin is dating Jin-wook with Woo-joo's blessing, Yoo-shin and Chan-woo are preparing for the birth of their first child, and Soon-shin films her first movie with Joon-ho. He is planning on proposing to her. Jung-ae narrates these last few minutes and says goodbye to her late husband. Upon their father's death, the three sisters have grown as individuals through enduring hardships as a family. They come to realize that the most precious things in life can be found within themselves, and happiness is a blessing that comes to the courageous few who have high self-esteem and take charge of their own lives.

== Cast ==
=== Main ===
- Lee Ji-eun as Lee Soon-shin

Soon-shin was named after the famous admiral Yi Sun-sin, a name given by her grandmother so that her mother would have a son. Her name also carries the connotation of believing in oneself in adversity. This, however, is an atypical name for a girl.

Soon-shin lives in the shadow of her better-looking, and smarter sisters. She gets poor grades, isn't very pretty, is short, and isn't particularly good at anything. She's not clever or tenacious. She can become overly emotional and is tender-hearted, frequently falling victim to scams, though her good nature means that she brushes off her older sister Yoo-shin's barbs with spunk and humor. When the show starts, Soon-shin is taking a few years off from college, on the pretext of looking for a job. In reality, she is still deciding what she wants to do with her life. When she starts acting, her bright personality and natural talent starts attracting positive attention from audiences and industry veterans.

- Jo Jung-suk as Shin Joon-ho

Once a rising singer-songwriter, Joon-ho quit making music and set up his own talent agency, the now-thriving Gabi Entertainment, of which he is CEO. As the son of a famous dermatologist in Seoul, Joon-ho had a privileged childhood, but always felt pressured to become a doctor, like his father. In high school, he secretly formed a band, but was later found out by his father and sent to America. There, he majored in commercial music. On graduation, he came back to Korea and released an album, which was a moderate success. His music career caused him to sever ties with his father. At the time, his girlfriend was actress Choi Yeon-ah. The two had quickly fallen in love, but when the failure of his second album plunged him into a deep slump, they soon split up.

Joon-ho later recovered, setting up a management agency. He successfully debuted two hot idol bands in just a few years and started to emerge as rising star in show business. Joon-ho is suave, exacting, and serious, though he is sometimes awkward. In response to Yeon-ah's challenge, he will groom Soon-shin to become a star, though he begins to understand the real meaning of success through Soon-shin.

- Go Doo-shim as Kim Jeong-ae

Mother of Hye-shin, Yoo-shin, and Soon-shin, she has lived her life as a dedicated wife, mother, and daughter-in-law. Jung-ae does not have much, but she has raised her three daughters as best as she can. Her eldest daughter is smart, demure and pretty, and she married a successful fund manager. She now lives in Hong Kong. The assertive, second daughter is a marketing executive for an outdoor sportswear brand. Her youngest, Soon-shin, always gets into trouble. She has no goal in life and no talent. Compared to her sisters, Soon-shin lacks both the looks and the brains. Jung-ae swears that she spared nothing in raising Soon-shin, but does not know what went wrong. However, she is aware that Soon-shin takes after her.

- Lee Mi-sook as Song Mi-ryung / Kim Kyung-sook

A famous actress, and the first client of Gabi Entertainment, Mi-ryung was once Korea's top actress. Although much older, and not as hot as before, she can still command quite a presence as a diva. She made her TV debut in her late twenties, after playing bit parts on stage for a long time. Her debut piece shot her straight to the top where she has stayed all this time. Mi-ryung has had several love affairs, but has never married. Her private life is a closely guarded secret, as she believes that an actress must remain mysterious. All her audience knows of her personal history is that her parents were teachers. Mi-ryung discovers Soon-shin's potential and takes her under her wing. She later finds out that she has a secret connection to Soon-shin's mother.

=== Supporting ===
- Yoo In-na as Lee Yoo-shin

Soon-shin's second oldest sister is a marketing executive for an outdoor sportswear brand. She is quite capable, outspoken, and sharp, yet somewhat incapable and lazy at doing housework. She excels at everything – sports, arts, even dating, as well as yoga, her long-time passion. Her interest lies in nature and spirituality. She is a vegetarian and passionate environmental activist. She is also full of contradictions. She cannot bear to lose and does not tolerate being overlooked, but still preaches tolerance and healing whenever she has a chance. She feels that her parents always loved Hye-shin and Soon-shin more than her. "Hye-shin is the perfect daughter and Soon-shin is the youngest. Then what am I? Why was I born?" Yoo-shin has had these existential questions since she was a child. Her self-worth was defined when, at age nine, she and Soon-shin played with matches and set fire to the kitchen. Her mother ran into the fire and saved Soon-shin first, leaving Yoo-shin traumatized for life. She has resented Soon-shin ever since. But after learning that Soon-shin was conned by a swindler, she started to look after her. She begins to date Chan-woo, however with a contract that will control their actions. But as time passes, they find that they really love each other and later get married.

- Son Tae-young as Lee Hye-shin

Soon-shin's eldest sister Hye-shin is beautiful, smart, elegant, and ladylike. She was always the most popular girl in school. Her life was a series of highlights and she was the apple of her parents' eyes. After graduating from a top university, she was on the fast track to a professional career at a multinational company. But she soon received a wedding proposal from a guy who has everything – prominent family, good looks, and wealth. Hye-shin has always lived up to the expectation to be the best, searching for the best answer in everything, even in marriage. But her marriage was not what she imagined it to be. Her fund manager husband looked down on her poor family, even though her parents had spent their entire retirement fund to give her a dream wedding. She followed her husband to Hong Kong, where she gave birth to a baby girl and spent seven years as a mother and housewife. Then one day she returned to Korea. Warm-hearted and upright, she sometimes finds it hard to express her own dilemmas to her family because of her responsibilities as the eldest daughter. She moves back in the family home with her daughter Woo-joo, lying to her family, saying that her husband has been transferred back to Seoul, when in fact they have divorced.

- Kim Yoon-seo as Choi Yeon-ah

A rising young actress, Yeon-ah broke Joon-ho's heart years ago, and currently has a mentor relationship with Mi-ryung. She intends to set up her own agency, and wants Joon-ho to release Mi-ryung for her to manage. Joon-ho tells Yeon-ah to give up her plans to go solo and just sign with him. But she challenges him, saying what would really prove his talent is making a star out of a nobody like Soon-shin. Then she would sign the contract. After noticing that Soon-Shin and Joon-ho seem to have a special connection with each other, she cancels their bet and starts to do everything in order to get Joon-ho back.

- Go Joo-won as Park Chan-woo

Chan-woo is a dermatologist who grew up next door to the Lee sisters. He is particularly sweet to Soon-shin, who has had a longtime crush on him. Chan-woo is gentle, hardworking and principled. He is a faithful son to his parents, and a caring brother to his younger sister. He even helps out at his parents' restaurant on weekends delivering fried chicken. His boss trusts him, and his patients adore him. Chan-woo went to the same middle school and high school with Yoo-shin. He had been Yoo-shin's pal since they were young, but started seeing her as a woman when they entered college. When he told Yoo-shin how he felt about her, she rejected him outright, causing them to grow apart. Chan-woo is a bit stuffy and old-fashioned, which clashes with Yoo-shin's casual-dating, free-spirited ways. But Chan-woo is still friends with her, which explains why he does not like it when Yoo-shin is mean to Soon-shin. This causes Chan-woo and Yoo-shin to end up arguing whenever they meet. However, these arguments made Chan-woo love Yoo-shin more, and they get married, even though his mother is against it.

- Jung Woo as Seo Jin-wook

In his past, Jin-wook was involved in a fight and ultimately landed in jail. In the present day, he works as a baker at a bakery near the residence of the Lee sisters. He meets Hye-shin and falls for her instantly, and later moves into the Lee home as a tenant. While Hye-shin tutors him with English lessons, he also teaches her how to box and play baseball, and more importantly, to become more vocal about her feelings. As the two gradually fall in love, Hye-shin's ex-husband returns asking for another chance. But even so, they still fight for their love and overcome obstacles together.

- Lee Ji-hoon as Kim Young-hoon

Young-hoon is the owner of the restaurant housed in the Gabi Entertainment office building, and also Joon-ho's friend. He hires Soon-shin as a waitress, after learning that she was conned by a swindler. He takes care of Soon-shin during her stay at the cafe. He is always there for her when she is sad.

- Kim Kap-soo as Shin Dong-hyuk

Dong-hyuk is the director of his own dermatology/cosmetic surgery hospital, and Joon-ho's father. Although Joon-ho has built his company into a respected and prestigious agency, Dong-hyuk thinks Joon-ho is staining the family name. He fears that Joon-ho will fall for some actress and bring her home as his wife, so he acts as a matchmaker, and keeps setting him up on blind dates, which his son purposely sabotages. Chan-woo is the new hire at his hospital, and he starts to mentor him. At first, he is always angry when he sees Song Mi-ryung but as time passes, he starts to open his heart to a new friend. They meet up coincidentally sometimes, causing his wife, Soo-jung to become jealous. He is then revealed to be a witness to the death of Lee Chang-hoon. Mi-ryung begs him to stay mum about it, but Reporter Park finds out that he was present at the scene and tells him to surrender the black box to the police, resulting in the case being reopened.

- Lee Eung-kyung as Yoon Soo-jung

Soo-jung is Joon-ho's mother, and Dong-hyuk's wife. In the first parts of the series, she and Song Mi-ryung were best friends, to Dong-hyuk's disgust. As a daughter of the former director of the dermatology/cosmetic surgery hospital which her husband now leads, she is known to be unfamiliar with household chores, such as house cleaning and dish washing. However, she is an unbelievable cook thanks to the cooking lessons Young-hoon gave her. As the series proceeds, she learns that Dong-hyuk is now meeting with Mi-ryung. At first she did not mind, happy that the "disgust" was now gone. However, she notices that Dong-hyuk is very happy with Mi-ryung and never shares a smile with her, which makes her very jealous, to the extent that she forces her husband out of the house and thinks of filing for divorce. As soon as she finds out that her husband was simply comforting Mi-ryung, who was facing problems, she started to understand it and let it be.

- Bae Geu-rin as Shin Yi-jung

Yi-jung is Joon-ho's sister and a spoiled brat. She was sent to study overseas but returned abruptly because she was "not qualified" for studies. She told her mother that she also wants to be an actress, the same dream as Soon-shin. She then enrolled in Mi-ryung's class, together with Soon-shin, on the advice of her mother. However, instead of real acting lessons, she was tasked to do household chores, with Mi-ryung saying that it was a part of the acting lessons. In every session, Mi-ryung does this and Yi-jung quits the class. She also had a crush with Chan-woo and tried to court his parents directly. However, she was rejected many times and Chan-woo's decision is irrevocable. She quits lurking around Chan-woo when she finds out that he is going to be married. In the latter part of the series, she was a moderator with her parents, as she tries to get them together again.

- Yoon Da-hoon as Hwang Il-do

Il-do is Mi-ryung's manager for 30 years, who she fires after learning of his corrupt practices. He was then rehired after news broke about Mi-ryung (it was also Il-do's fault, though Mi-ryung does not know). He also gives advice to Mi-ryung, much to her disgust, on what she should do in certain situations like admitting she had a child. Ironically, Mi-rung never takes his advice at first, but after thinking about it, she invariably follows his suggestions. He also played a role in Soon-shin and Mi-ryung's reconciliation.

- Kim Yong-rim as Shim Mak-rye

Mak-re is the Lee girls grandmother and lives with them. At her old age, she still loves hiking. She was affected deeply when her son died in an accident. She always has a say in every family decision.

- Song Min-hyung as Park Bok-man

Bok-man is Chan-woo's father, and friend.

- Kim Dong-joo as Jang Gil-ja

Gil-ja is Chan-woo's mother and proprietress of a chicken restaurant. At first, she was very angry that Chan-woo picked Yoo-shin because she felt her to be irresponsible and lazy. However, after several outings with Yoo-shin, she ultimately started to like her and became supportive of the newlywed couple.

- Lee Seul-bi as Park Chan-mi

Chan-mi is Chan-woo's younger sister, and Soon-shin's friend. When Soon-shin became an actress, she became her personal assistant (called "coordi" in Korean, short for coordinator). She becomes the love interest of In-sung, Joon-ho's secretary.

- Lee Ji-hoon as Jo In-sung

In-sung is a former aspiring actor, who is now Joon-ho's right-hand man and secretary at Gabi Entertainment. He was tasked by Joon-ho to look after Soon-shin whenever he is not around. He also loves to gossip, particularly with Chan-mi, whom he eventually falls for. So that he will receive her family's blessing, he always treats Chan-mi at her family's chicken restaurant.

- Kim Hwan-hee as Han Woo-joo

Woo-joo is Hye-shin's daughter. She vents her misplaced anger about her parents' divorce at Jin-wook. But after she learns about her father's ongoing relationship with his mistress, she starts to open up her heart to Jin-wook.

- Jung Dong-hwan as Lee Chang-hoon

Chang-hoon is Mak-rye's son, Jung-ae's husband and father of the Lee sisters. He shares a past with Mi-ryung, and dies after saving her from an oncoming car.

- Kim Young-jae as Han Jae-hyung

Jae-hyung is Hye-shin's ex-husband and Woo-joo's father.

- Kim Kwang-kyu as "Manager Shin"

Kwang-kyu is a con man who impersonates Shin Joon-ho. He scams Soon-shin into believing he is going to groom her to become an actress, when in fact he took out a ₩20 million bank loan in her name, as he has done with other aspiring actresses.

- Choi Gang-won as Go Jae-bum

Jae-bum is one of the co-employee of Soon-shin and very spoiled to her at Black Smith Restaurant and co-worker with his manager Young-hoon.

== Original soundtrack ==
You're the Best, Lee Soon-shin: Original Sound Track

Soundtrack album by Various Artists
- Genres: Pop, K-pop, soundtrack, R&B, teen pop
- Labels: AStory, LOEN Entertainment

Part 1:
No.	Title	Artist	Length
1.	"Molla Molla (몰라몰라)"	Tahiti	03:18
2.	"Molla Molla (몰라몰라) (inst.)"		03:18

Part 2:
No.	Title	Artist	Length
1.	"Counting Stars at Night (별 헤는 밤)"	Sunny Hill	03:35

Part 3:
No.	Title	Artist	Length
1.	"I Completely Love You (완전 사랑해요)"	Jo Jung-suk	03:09
2.	"I Completely Love You (완전 사랑해요) (inst.)"		03:09
3.	"I Can't Live Without You (한 사람만 보여요)"	Changmin (2AM) and Dahee (GLAM)	03:59
4.	"I Can't Live Without You (한 사람만 보여요) (inst.)"		03:59

== Viewership ==
In the ratings below, the highest rating for the show will in be red, and the lowest rating for the show will be in blue.

List of ratings (episode 1-50)

Episode	Broadcast Date	TNmS Ratings(%)		AGB Ratings(%)	
Episode	Broadcast Date	Average audience share			
Episode	Broadcast Date	Entire Country	Seoul National Capital Area	Entire Country	Seoul National Capital Area
1	March 9, 2013	25.9% (1st)	26.6% (1st)	22.2% (2nd)	22.5% (2nd)
2	March 10, 2013	27.2% (1st)	28.3% (1st)	24.3% (1st)	24.8% (1st)
3	March 16, 2013	23.7% (1st)	23.9% (2nd)	21.0% (1st)	22.1% (2nd)
4	March 17, 2013	25.6% (1st)	25.7% (1st)	25.2% (1st)	26.6% (1st)
5	March 23, 2013	22.0% (1st)	23.1% (2nd)	22.3% (1st)	22.6% (1st)
6	March 24, 2013	26.7% (1st)	26.8% (1st)	26.2% (1st)	26.4% (1st)
7	March 30, 2013	25.3% (1st)	26.6% (1st)	23.3% (1st)	23.5% (1st)
8	March 31, 2013	28.7% (1st)	29.6% (1st)	26.9% (1st)	27.6% (1st)
9	April 6, 2013	25.7% (1st)	26.1% (1st)	25.9% (1st)	26.9% (1st)
10	April 7, 2013	28.5% (1st)	29.0% (1st)	27.3% (1st)	28.6% (1st)
11	April 13, 2013	24.0% (1st)	23.3% (2nd)	24.0% (1st)	25.4% (1st)
12	April 14, 2013	27.4% (1st)	27.4% (2nd)	28.0% (1st)	29.8% (1st)
13	April 20, 2013	25.6% (1st)	25.1% (2nd)	25.9% (1st)	27.1% (1st)
14	April 21, 2013	26.2% (1st)	26.5% (1st)	27.3% (1st)	29.4% (1st)
15	April 27, 2013	23.7% (2nd)	23.0% (2nd)	23.0% (2nd)	23.2% (2nd)
16	April 28, 2013	26.8% (1st)	26.9% (1st)	26.7% (1st)	27.5% (1st)
17	May 4, 2013	21.7% (2nd)	21.4% (2nd)	21.7% (2nd)	23.6% (2nd)
18	May 5, 2013	25.4% (1st)	25.4% (2nd)	26.2% (2nd)	28.2% (2nd)
19	May 11, 2013	21.0% (2nd)	22.0% (2nd)	22.0% (2nd)	23.7% (2nd)
20	May 12, 2013	26.0% (2nd)	26.3% (2nd)	27.6% (2nd)	29.7% (2nd)
21	May 18, 2013	24.9% (2nd)	25.6% (2nd)	24.6% (2nd)	26.1% (2nd)
22	May 19, 2013	27.3% (1st)	28.5% (2nd)	29.5% (1st)	32.0% (1st)
23	May 25, 2013	22.9% (2nd)	23.6% (2nd)	23.8% (2nd)	25.7% (2nd)
24	May 26, 2013	27.0% (1st)	27.7% (2nd)	28.4% (1st)	30.9% (1st)
25	June 1, 2013	24.2% (2nd)	25.7% (2nd)	24.9% (2nd)	25.6% (2nd)
26	June 2, 2013	26.6% (1st)	27.4% (2nd)	29.8% (1st)	32.3% (1st)
27	June 8, 2013	23.5% (2nd)	24.2% (2nd)	24.4% (2nd)	26.2% (2nd)
28	June 9, 2013	26.1% (1st)	26.6% (2nd)	29.6% (1st)	31.7% (1st)
29	June 15, 2013	22.0% (2nd)	22.7% (2nd)	23.2% (2nd)	24.6% (2nd)
30	June 16, 2013	24.8% (2nd)	26.5% (2nd)	27.9% (2nd)	31.0% (2nd)
31	June 22, 2013	24.2% (2nd)	25.2% (2nd)	24.2% (2nd)	26.2% (2nd)
32	June 23, 2013	26.1% (2nd)	27.1% (2nd)	27.5% (2nd)	28.5% (2nd)
33	June 29, 2013	23.5% (1st)	26.3% (1st)	23.5% (1st)	24.6% (1st)
34	June 30, 2013	26.4% (1st)	27.7% (1st)	26.9% (1st)	27.8% (1st)
35	July 6, 2013	22.2% (1st)	24.0% (1st)	24.0% (1st)	25.1% (1st)
36	July 7, 2013	26.6% (1st)	28.0% (1st)	29.9% (1st)	31.7% (1st)
37	July 13, 2013	23.8% (1st)	26.1% (1st)	23.7% (1st)	24.4% (1st)
38	July 14, 2013	27.8% (1st)	30.6% (1st)	28.5% (1st)	31.7% (1st)
39	July 20, 2013	23.2% (1st)	24.4% (1st)	24.4% (1st)	26.5% (1st)
40	July 21, 2013	28.6% (1st)	30.3% (1st)	30.1% (1st)	32.6% (1st)
41	July 27, 2013	24.0% (1st)	25.9% (1st)	25.2% (1st)	27.0% (1st)
42	July 28, 2013	24.0% (1st)	24.7% (1st)	27.1% (1st)	30.4% (1st)
43	August 3, 2013	23.0% (1st)	22.9% (1st)	22.9% (1st)	22.9% (1st)
44	August 4, 2013	26.4% (1st)	25.8% (1st)	26.0% (1st)	27.4% (1st)
45	August 10, 2013	24.6% (1st)	27.1% (1st)	23.7% (1st)	25.5% (1st)
46	August 11, 2013	27.0% (1st)	28.2% (1st)	26.6% (1st)	28.0% (1st)
47	August 17, 2013	24.5% (1st)	25.8% (1st)	25.0% (1st)	26.0% (1st)
48	August 18, 2013	27.9% (1st)	29.2% (1st)	30.8% (1st)	33.4% (1st)
49	August 24, 2013	24.4% (1st)	24.0% (1st)	25.6% (1st)	25.8% (1st)
50	August 25, 2013	29.3% (1st)	31.8% (1st)	30.1% (1st)	31.8% (1st)
Average		25.3%	26.1%	25.8%	27.3%

Sources: TNmS Media Korea & AGB Nielsen Korea

== Awards and nominations ==
Year	Award	Category	Recipient	Result
2013	Korea Drama Awards	Top Excellence Award, Actress	Lee Mi-sook	Nominated
2013	Korea Drama Awards	Excellence Award, Actress	IU	Nominated
2013	KBS Drama Awards	Top Excellence Award, Actress in a Serial Drama	Lee Mi-sook	Nominated
2013	KBS Drama Awards	Excellence Award, Actor in a Serial Drama	Jo Jung-suk	Won
2013	KBS Drama Awards	Excellence Award, Actress in a Serial Drama	Lee Mi-sook	Won
2013	KBS Drama Awards	Excellence Award, Actress in a Serial Drama	IU	Nominated
2013	KBS Drama Awards	Best Supporting Actress	Yoo In-na	Nominated
2013	KBS Drama Awards	Best New Actor	Jung Woo	Won
2013	KBS Drama Awards	Best New Actress	IU	Won
2013	KBS Drama Awards	Best Young Actress	Kim Hwan-hee	Nominated
2013	KBS Drama Awards	Best Couple Award	Jo Jung-suk and IU	Won
2014	Baeksang Arts Awards	Most Popular Actor (TV)	Jo Jung-suk	Nominated
2014	Baeksang Arts Awards	Most Popular Actress (TV)	IU	Nominated

== Title controversy ==
Global Youth League DN filed an injunction in Seoul Central District Court against broadcaster KBS for using the name "Lee Soon-shin" in the title of the drama. The injunction requested that the broadcast be halted immediately, that "Lee Soon-shin" be removed from the title, and that the character's name be changed. The group claimed that historical figure Lee Soon-shin (or Yi Sun-sin), an admiral famed for his victories against the Japanese Navy in the Imjin War during the Joseon period, is an official national symbol whose status will "deteriorate" when associated with the "weak and clumsy" protagonist that lead actress IU plays.

KBS and production company A Story said they have no plans of changing the title or character name. Instead, they altered the original drama poster where several cast members are sitting on a pile of 100 won coins that have an image of Admiral Yi, by digitally replacing the coins with a plain gold platform.
