= Lee Seul-bi =

South Korean actress (born 1991)

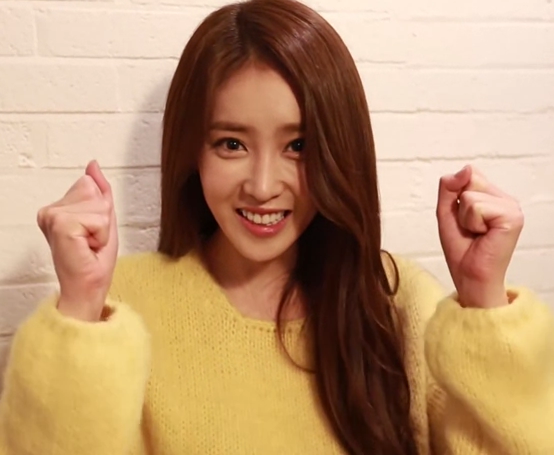
- Lee in 2015
- Born: April 24, 1991 (age 35); Suncheon, South Korea
- Education: Sangmyung University – Theatre and Film
- Occupation: Actress
- Agent: Wid May Entertainment

Korean name
- Hangul: 이슬비
- RR: I Seulbi
- MR: I Sŭlbi

Lee Seul-bi (Korean: 이슬비; born April 24, 1991), also known by her ex-stage name Ga Won, is a South Korean actress.

== Filmography ==
=== Films ===
Year	Title	Role
2009	Lifting King Kong	Lee Soo-ok
2011	The Suicide Forecast	Hwang Woo-chul's daughter
2011	In Love and War	Soon-hee
2014	Virgin Theory: 7 Steps to Get On the Top	Ballet female college student (cameo)

=== Television series ===
Year	Title	Role	Network
2010	OB & GY	Im Seung-min	SBS
2010	Stormy Lovers	Na-ra	MBC
2011	The Princess' Man	So-aeng	KBS2
2012	Bridal Mask	Shim Soon-yi (ep. 20-21)	KBS2
2012	Glass Mask	Seo Jung-ha (real) / Kim Ha-ra	tvN
2012	Dream of the Emperor	Lady Ji-so	KBS1
2013	You Are the Best!	Park Chan-mi	KBS2
2014	A Witch's Love	Oh Rin-ji	tvN
2015	The Three Witches	Seo Hyang	SBS
2016	One More Happy Ending	Song So-eun	MBC
2016	Father, I'll Take Care of You	Bang Mi-joo	MBC
2016	Guardian: The Lonely and Great God	Vain woman at cafe (ep. 3)	tvN
