= Glass Mask (TV series) =

2012–2013 South Korean melodrama television series

- Promotional poster
- Hangul: 유리가면
- RR: Yurigamyeon
- MR: Yurigamyŏn
- Genre: Melodrama; Revenge; Romance
- Created by: Park Ji-Young (CJ ENM)
- Written by: Choi Young-in
- Directed by: Shin Seung-woo
- Starring: Seo Woo; Lee Ji-hoon; Park Jin-woo; Kim Yoon-seo
- Music by: Nam Hye-seung (CP); Ikeugeobuk
- Country of origin: South Korea
- Original language: Korean
- No. of episodes: 122

Production
- Executive producers: Lee Chan-ho; Oh Nam-seok (CP)
- Producers: Lee Jae-hoon; Lee Hyung-sun; Jeong Se-ryeong
- Editor: Lee Heon-jun
- Running time: 35 minutes
- Production company: MBC C&I

Original release
- Network: tvN
- Release: September 3, 2012 – April 4, 2013

Related
- Ice Adonis

Glass Mask (Korean: 유리가면) is a 2012 melodrama South Korean television series starring Seo Woo, Lee Ji-hoon, Park Jin-woo, and Kim Yoon-seo. It premiered on September 3, 2012 on tvN and aired on Mondays to Friday at 21:45 (KST).

== Synopsis ==
The series follows Kang Yi-kyung, a woman whose father is a murderer. She must deal with tough times and also plot her revenge. To fulfill her revenge, she assumes another woman's identity and comes back as Seo Jung-ha.

== Cast ==
=== Main ===
- Seo Woo as Kang Yi-kyung / Seo Jung-ha
  - Jung Da-bin as teen Yi-kyung
  - Lee Do-yun as child Jung-ha
- Lee Ji-hoon as Kim Seon-jae
- Park Jin-woo as Kim Ha-joon
- Kim Yoon-seo as Kang Seo-yeon
  - Ahn Eun-jung as child Seo-yeon

=== Supporting ===
- Yang Geum-seok as Jung Hye-ran
- Jung Ae-ri as Shim Hae-soon
- Kang Shin-il as Kang In-chil
- Gi Ju-bong as Shin Ki-tae
- Park Gun-rak as Seo Jung-pal
- Yoon Park as Kang Gun
  - Lee Tae-woo as child Gun
- Han In-soo as Director Seo Yong Bok
- Lee Seul-bi as Kim Ha-ra / Seo Jung-ha
- Kim Kwang-young as Secretary Cha Hyun-tae
- Kim Mi-ryeo as Ahm Mi-young
- Kim Hee-jung as Kim Young-hee
- Jung Ji-yeon as Hong Ji-soo
- Jung Min-sung as Do Jin-wook
- Yoon Seo-hyun as So Dae-young
- Kim Jung-hak as Kim Joon-ho
- Maeng Bong-hak as Yoo Min-ki

=== Extended ===
- Park Ji-so as Ji Ni
- Jang Joon-yoo as Yoo Nan
- Jo Jae-ryong as Goo Bong-seo
- Lee Jong-goo as Oh Il-hwan
- Jun Jin-gi as Kim Do-shik
- Lee Shin-ae as Han Na
- Kim Tae-young as Dr. Yoon
- Hong Seung-ho as Song Min-chul
- Min Joo-hyun as Seoul Regional Tax Office Investigator

=== Cameo appearances ===
- Yoo Jae-hyun as Financial Manager
- Park Gyu-jum as Fidelli Director
- Go Jin-myung as Fidelli Director
- Kim Kwang-in as Fidelli Director
- Jun Hun-tae as Police
- Dan Kang-ho as Shin Ki-tae's Physician
- Goo Bo-suk as Park Sung-bo
- 4th Floor as Bad Boys
- Cilia Boes as Fidelli Designer
- Park Shi-jin as In Ho
- Kim Sung-ki
- Chun Ye-won
- Park Chan

== Production ==
On July 10, 2012, Seo Woo was cast as the female lead, while Park Jin-woo was under consideration for the male lead, and principal photography was scheduled to begin the following month. On August 3, Seo Woo, Lee Ji-hoon, Park Jin-woo, and Kim Yoon-seo, were reportedly confirmed to star. The script reading took place on August 5.

== Original soundtrack ==
Glass Mask OST
No.	Title	singer	Length
1.	"Cry Bye"	LoVe LeTTer
2.	"Cry Bye（Inst.）"	Various Artists
3.	"Pain and Pain"	Bada
4.	"Pain and Pain（Inst.）"	Various Artists
