= Billie Jean, Look at Me =

2006–2007 South Korean television series

- Promotional poster
- Also known as: Look at Me
- Genre: Romantic comedy
- Written by: Kim Ui-chan; Jung Jin-young
- Directed by: Min Doo-shik
- Starring: Lee Ji-hoon; Park Hee-von
- Country of origin: South Korea
- No. of episodes: 26

Production
- Running time: Mondays and Tuesdays at 23:55 (KST)

Original release
- Network: Munhwa Broadcasting Corporation
- Release: December 26, 2006 – February 6, 2007

Billie Jean, Look at Me (Korean: 빌리 진 날 봐요) is a South Korean television series that aired from December 26, 2006, to February 6, 2007, on MBC.

== Plot ==
Yoo Bang-hee's (Park Hee-von) Prince Charming is teen idol Choi Hye-Seong (Lee Ji-hoon), not exactly the most approachable person. Turning her one-sided love into near stalking, Bang-Hee ends up ruining Hye-Seong's young career by revealing information she shouldn't have to the public. Eight years pass by, and Hye-Seong is still suffering from that failure, roaming the streets aimlessly when a familiar face suddenly appears. Bang-Hee, now an assistant writer for a Star Making Project, promises she'll make up for all her mistakes by making Hye-Seong a star.

== Cast ==
- Lee Ji-hoon as Choi Hye-sung
- Park Hee-von as Yoo Bang-hee
- Park Tam-hee as Wie Soo-kyung
- Lee Da-jin as Jang Ji-young
- Kim Il-woo as Uncle
- Kim Jae-seung

== Broadcast ==
The broadcast takes place between the December 26, 2006 and the February 6, 2007 on MBC.

== See also ==
- Billie Jean, Look At Me OST
