= Lee Ji-hoon (entertainer) =

South Korean actor and singer (born 1979)

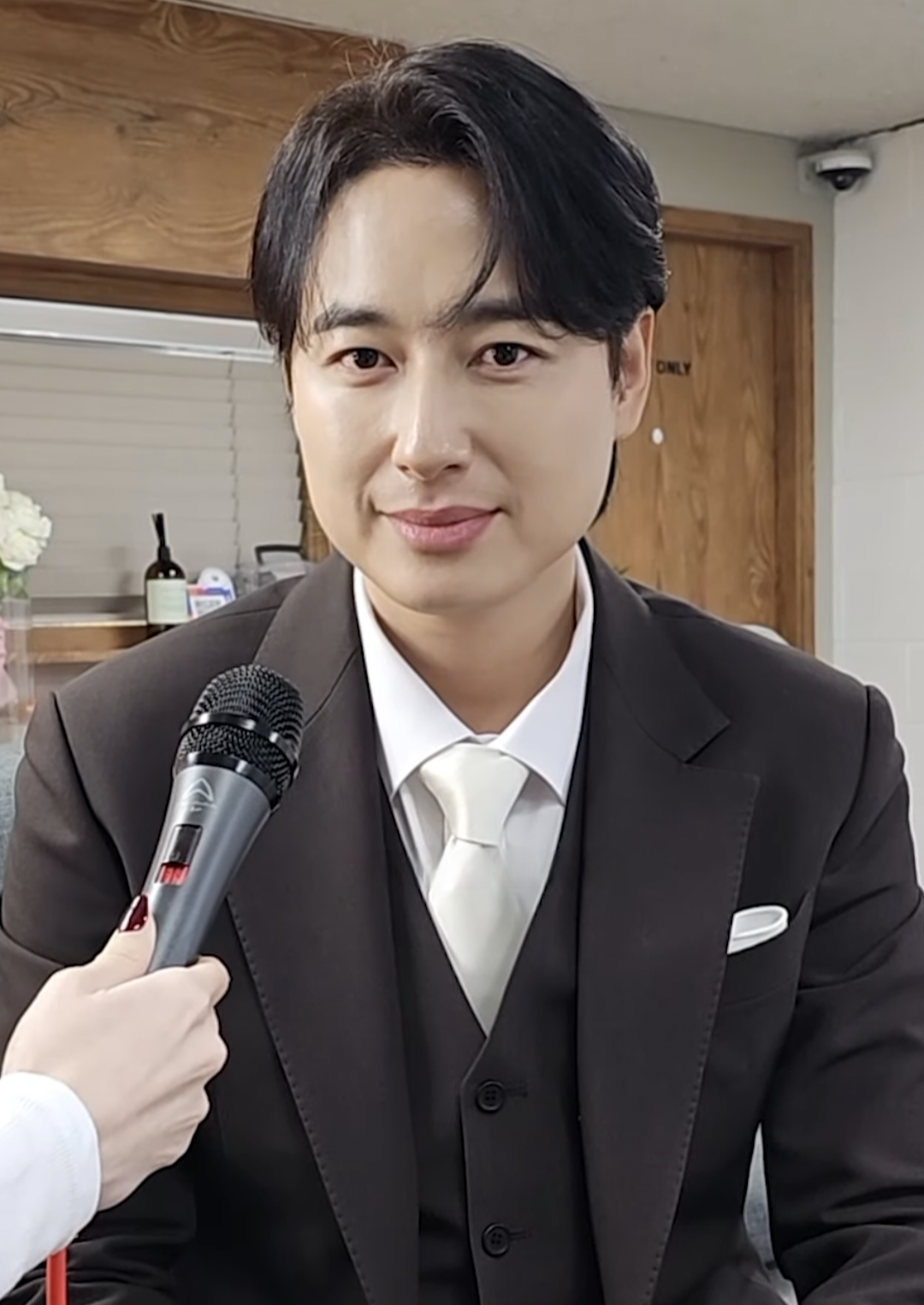
- Lee in March 2024
- Born: March 27, 1979 (age 47); Seoul, South Korea
- Other names: Lee Ji Hoon; Yi Jee Hoon
- Occupations: Actor; singer
- Years active: 1996–present
- Spouse: Ayane Miura (m. 2021)
- Children: 1

Korean name
- Hangul: 이지훈
- Hanja: 李志勳
- RR: I Jihun
- MR: I Chihun
- Website: leejeehoon.co.kr (Korean) leejeehoon.jp (Japanese)

Lee Ji-hoon (Korean: 이지훈; Hanja: 李志勳; born March 27, 1979) is a South Korean singer and actor.

== Career ==
Lee made his debut on October 15, 1996, while he was still in high school, with the single "Why the Heaven". He had not been able to release a solo album since his 4 album released in February 2001. Instead of performing on stage as a solo singer, he and Kangta formed a project group called the "S" with their close singer friend, Shin Hye-sung.

In May 2004, Lee released a new album as a solo vocalist. The title song of the new album was "Trinity", a ballad sung with a shouting-like singing style. Female vocalist Lee Soo-young and Shin Hye-sung, a member of Shinhwa, participated in the new album by Lee.

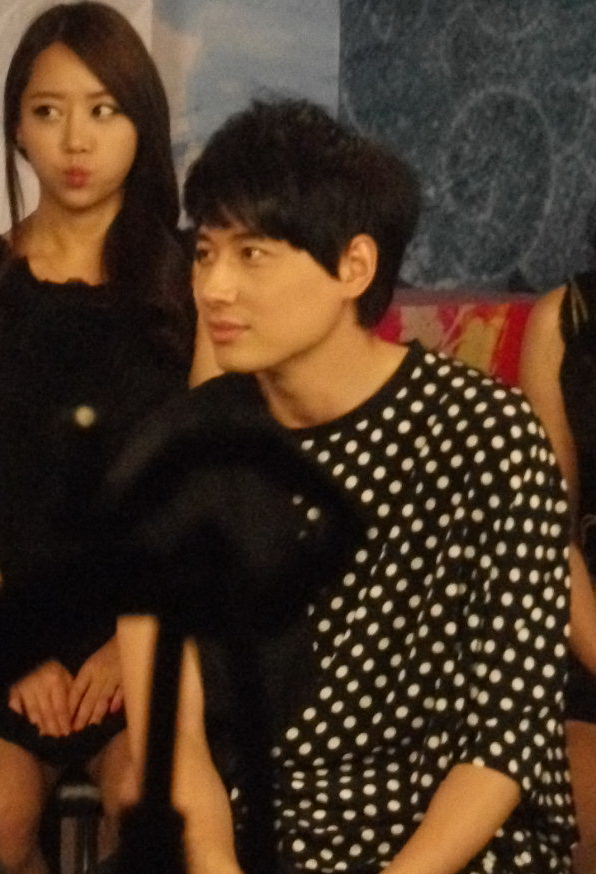
Lee in 2012

He also acted in the movie, Lovely Rivals and Wet Dreams 2. His first major role was as Kim Jaewon's rival for Eugene's affections in Wonderful Life. He then starred in Hello! Miss and New Heart. He also starred in KBS daily drama You Are My Destiny opposite of Girls' Generation member, Im Yoona.

In March 2011, Lee signed with Japanese label EMI Music Japan. Lee performed as male lead Daniel, rotating with Um Ki-joon, Ahn Jae-wook, Song Seung-hyun of FT Island and Lee Sungmin of Super Junior in the musical Jack the Ripper from July 5 to August 14, 2011, at Chungmu Arts Hall.

In September 2013, it was announced that Lee had been cast as Fiyero Tigelaar in the Korean production of the musical Wicked.

== Personal life ==
In April 2021, Lee announced on his Instagram that he would marry his non-celebrity Japanese girlfriend, Ayane Miura, who is fourteen years his junior. The wedding was intended to be held in October 2021, but had to be postponed to November 2021 due to COVID-19. The wedding took place on November 8, 2021.

On February 16, 2024, it was announced that Lee's wife was pregnant, which they revealed was achieved through in vitro fertilization. On July 17, 2024, Lee's wife gave birth to a daughter. On December 24, 2025, Lee's wife shared the news that she had suffered a miscarriage of their second child.

== Discography ==
=== Studio albums ===
Title	Album details	Peak chart positions	Sales
Title	Album details	KOR	Sales
Rhythm Paradise	Released: November 25, 1996; Label: Samsung Music; Format: CD; Track list: 1. 왜 하늘은; 2. 내 여자가 바람을 펴 3. 산타 바이러스; 4. 퍼퓸; 5. In 1978; 6. 내게서 널 지운다면; 7. Daddy Be Cool; 8. 무제; 9. 나만의 신부; 10. 오아시스 (Dance version); 11. In 1978 (이별 예감)	No data	No data
Love and Forever	Released: October 17, 1997; Label: Samsung Music; Format: CD; Track list: 1. 이별; 2. 니가 웃을때면; 3. 내게 말해줘; 4. 그녀가 가잖아; 5. 연상의 여인; 6. 생각해봐; 7. 상처; 8. 겨울 (우설(雨雪)); 9. 슬픈 우정; 10. 기억 속에; 11. I Will; 12. Alone (이별)(English version)	No data	No data
Man	Released: June 18, 1998; Label: Samsung Music; Format: CD; Track list: 1. Shake it Up; 2. 그날 이후; 3. Good-bye Love; 4. 언제라도; 5. 돌아와; 6. Oh! Destiny; 7. 사랑이란건; 8. 깜짝 파티; 9. 너를 지켜줄게 (with Yangpa); 10. Good-bye Love (Instrumental)	No data	No data
Eternity Friend	Released: April 2, 2000; Label: Nice Entertainment; Format: CD, cassette; Track list: 1. 덫 (Trap); 2. Angel; 3. 천애 (For You...); 4. Wedding; 5. 가장 사랑할 때 떠난 너를; 6. 시선 (Allure); 7. Sad; 8. 사화 (아이리스); 9. 친구라는 이름 (Eternity Friend); 10. 슬픈 연극; 11. 마지막 잎새 (Tears); 12. 날 위한 이별 (Without You); 13. Happiness; 14. Open	4	KOR: 136,845+
Special With...	Released: February 1, 2001; Label: SM Entertainment; Format: CD, cassette; Track list: 1. Until; 2. 인형 (with Shin Hye-sung); 3. Here I Am; 4. My Romance; 5. 왜 하늘은; 6. 나만의 신부; 7. 이별; 8. 그녀가 가잖아; 9. Good-bye Love; 10. 언제라도; 11. 너를 지켜줄게 (with Yangpa); 12. 천애; 13. Angel; 14. 가장 사랑할 때 떠난 너를; 15. 인형 (Ji-hoon solo version); 16. 인형 (MR)	7	KOR: 171,438+
Trinity	Released: April 21, 2004; Label: Nice Entertainment; Format: CD, cassette; Track list: 1. 이별 이야기; 2. 약속; 3. My Last Love; 4. 다른 세상에서도; 5. U 6. Goodbye; 7. 오늘만은; 8. 그날; 9. 제발; 10. 더 늦기 전에; 11. 지켜만 볼게; 12. Just For You	20	KOR: 10,584+
The Classic	Released: February 13, 2008; Label: M&FC; Format: CD, cassette; Track list: 1. 그대가 떠나갑니다; 2. 너를 닮은 나라서; 3. 그만두세요; 4. 가슴아 미안하다; 5. 친구; 6. 아나요; 7. Goodbye; 8. 그대가 떠나갑니다 (Instrumental); 9. 가슴아 미안하다 (Instrumental)	—	—N/a

== Filmography ==
=== Film ===
Year	Title	Role	Ref.
2004	Lovely Rivals	Kwon Sang-choon	
2004	New Royal Secret Commissioner	voice	
2005	Wet Dreams 2	Kang Bong-goo	
2013	Good Friends	Joon-oh	
2022	Idol Recipe	Bae Jae-seong	

=== Television ===
Year	Title	Role
2005	Wonderful Life	Min Do-yun
2006–2007	Billie Jean, Look at Me	Choi Hye-sung
2007	Hello! Miss	Hwang Dong-gyu
2007–2008	New Heart	Lee Dong-gwon
2008–2009	You Are My Destiny	Kim Tae-poong
2009	Can't Stop Now	Noh Soo-ri
2010–2011	The King of Legend	Hae Gun
2011	KBS Drama Special "Identical Criminals"	Han Sang-won
2011–2012	My Daughter the Flower	Eun Chae-wan
2012–2013	Glass Mask	Kim Seon-jae
2013	You Are the Best!	Kim Young-hoon
2016	Jang Yeong-sil	Jang Hee-je
2016–2017	My Fair Lady	Cha Chi-soo
2023–2024	Korea–Khitan War	Jang Yeon-woo
2026	Sword & Silence	Pidam

=== Web shows ===
Year	Title	Role	Notes	Ref.
2021	Baekdol's Great Escape	Host	with Kwon Hyuk-soo	

=== Radio shows ===
Year	Title	Role	Note	Ref.
2021	Beautiful Morning This is Kim Chang-wan	Special DJ	August 10 – August 11	

=== Music video appearances ===
Year	Song Title	Artist	Ref.
2022	"I Hate Trot" (나는 트로트가 싫어요)	Im Chang-jung	

== Musical theatre ==
Year	Title	Role
2006	Altar Boyz	Matthew
2008–2009	Hamlet	Hamlet
2009	March of Youth	Wang Gyeong-tae
2009–2010	The Harmonium in My Memory	Kang Dong-soo
2010	Brave Brothers	Joo Bong
2010	Thrill Me	Richard Loeb
2011	High-tech Musical Wonhyo	Wonhyo
2011	Jack The Ripper	Daniel
2011	The Three Musketeers	D'Artagnan
2011–2012	Evita	Che
2012	Lovers in Paris	Han Ki-joo
2013	Elisabeth	Luigi Lucheni
2013–2014	Wicked	Fiyero
2014	Priscilla, Queen of the Desert	Anthony "Tick" Belrose ("Mitzi Mitosis")
2014–2015	La Cage aux Folles	Albin
2015	Elisabeth	Luigi Lucheni
2015–2016	Le Passe-Muraille	Dusoleil
2016	Mozart!	Wolfgang Amadeus Mozart
2016	Kinky Boots	Charlie
2017	Hero	Ahn Jung-geun
2017	Hamlet	Hamlet
2017	Interview	Sinclair Gordon
2018	Anna Karenina	Count Vronsky
2018	Bungee Jumping of Their Own	In Woo
2021	Xcalibur	King Arthur
2022	Xcalibur	Lancelot
2022	Gwangju	Yoon Yi-geon
2022	Elisabeth	Luigi Lucheni
2022–2023	The Devotion of Suspect X	Yukawa
2015	Ruth	Boaz
2015	Ber-Hur	Messala

== Awards ==
- 1997년 02월 15일 <MBC TV 인기가요 BEST 50 1위> (First place MBC TV Best 50 Songs)
- 1997년 02월 19일 < KBS TV 가요 TOP 10 1위> (First place KBS TV Top Ten Songs)
- 1997년 02월 29일 < MBC TV 인기가요 BEST 50 1위> (First place MBC TV Best 50 Songs)
- 1997년 03월 2일 < SBS TV 가요 20 1위> (First place SBS TV Top 20 Songs)
- 1997년 03월 12일 <KBS TV 가요 TOP 10 1위> (First place KBS Top Ten Songs)
- 1997년 12월 4일 <스포츠 서울가요 대상 "신인상" 수상> (Best New Artist Sports Seoul Music Awards)
- 1997년 12월 14일 <일간스포츠 영상음반 대상 "10대 가수상"수상> (Il Gan Sports Award Top Ten Singer)
- 1997년 12월 14일 <KMTV 97 가요대전 "인기가수상" 수상> (KMTV 97 Gayo Challenge "Most Popular Singer")
- 1997년 12월 28일 <SBS TV 가요대상 "신인상" 수상> (Best New Artist SBS Music Award)
- 1997년 12월 30일 < KBS TV 가요대상 "인기가수상" 수상> (Best New Artist KBS Music Award)
- 1년 03월 10 일 MBC TV 음악캠프 1위 (First place MBC TV Music Camp)
- 1년 03월 31 일 MBC TV 음악캠프 1위 (First place MBC TV Music Camp)
- 2001년 04월 1 일 SBS TV 인기가요 1위 (First place SBS TV Popular Gayo)
- 2003년 10월 25일 MBC TV 음악캠프 "I SWEAR> 1위 (First place "I Swear" MBC TV Music Camp)
