= Yesung discography =

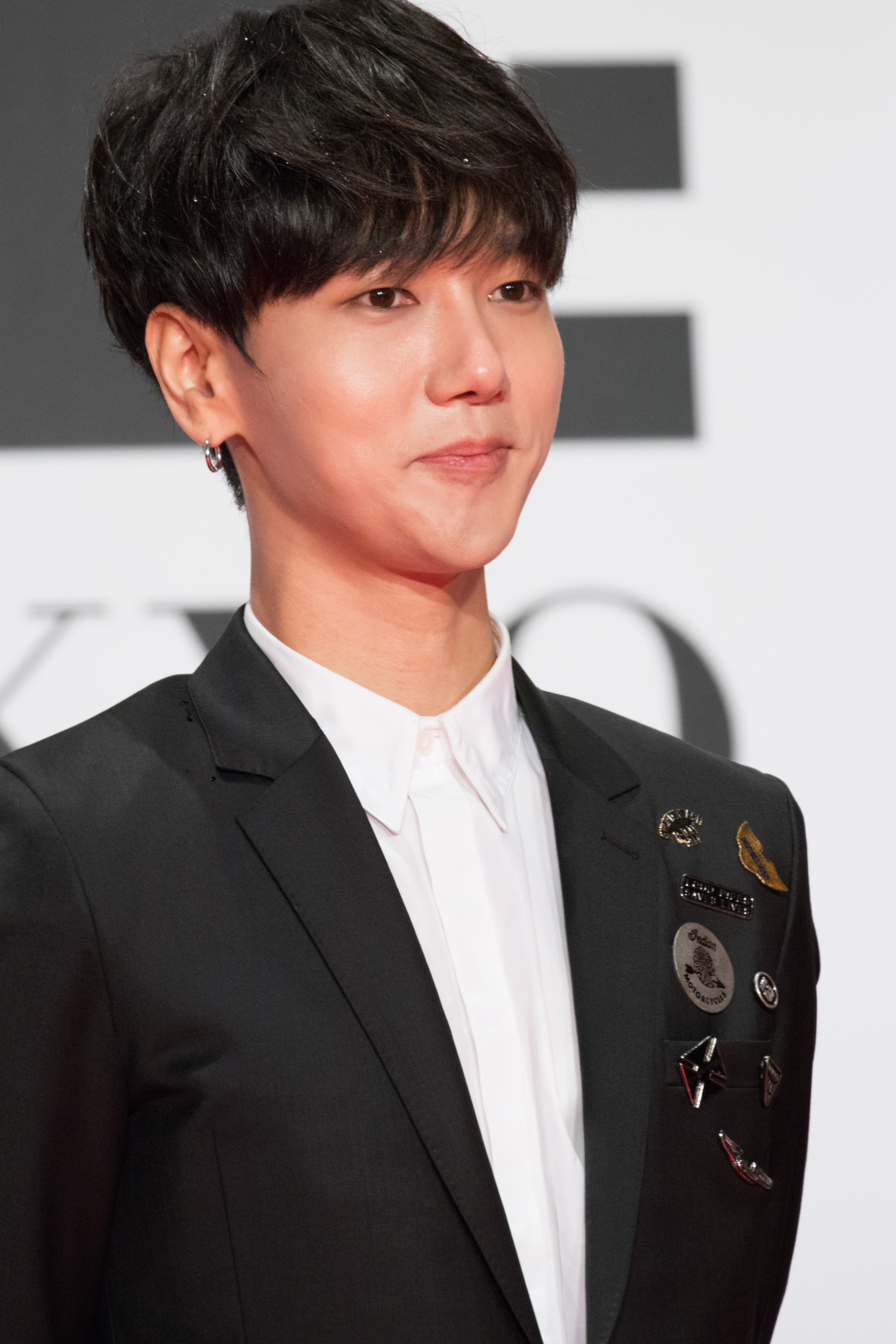
- Yesung in 2016
- Studio albums: 4
- EPs: 7
- Singles: 8
- Music videos: 5
- Promotional singles: 0
- Soundtrack appearances: 13

The discography of South Korean singer-songwriter Yesung, consists of four studio albums (two in Japanese and two in Korean), seven extended plays (EPs) in which one was in Japanese and six in Korean, and twelve singles.

== Albums ==
=== Studio albums ===
List of studio albums, with selected details and chart positions
Title	Details	Peak chart positions		Sales
Title	Details	KOR	JPN	Sales
Story	Released: February 20, 2019 (JPN); Label: Avex Trax; Formats: CD, digital download	—	7	JPN: 12,391+
Sensory Flows	Released: January 25, 2023 (KOR); Label: SM Entertainment; Formats: CD, digital download	4	23	KOR: 118,161+; JPN: 1,718+
Sakihokoru Toki wo Matsu no wa (咲き誇る時を待つのは)	Released: May 27, 2026 (JPN); Label: Avex Trax; Formats: CD, digital download	—	3	JPN: 30,589+
Where We Are	Released: October 6, 2026 (KOR); Label: SM Entertainment; Formats: CD, digital download	5	—	KOR: 122,212

=== Reissues ===
List of reissues, with selected details and chart positions
Title	Details	Peak chart positions		Sales
Title	Details	KOR	JPN	Sales
Floral Sense	Released: February 27, 2023; Label: SM Entertainment; Formats: CD, LP, digital download	4	35	KOR: 51,455+; JPN: 1,593+

== Extended plays ==
List of extended plays, with selected chart positions and sales
Title	Details	Peak chart positions		Sales
Title	Details	KOR	JPN	Sales
Here I Am	Released: April 19, 2016; Label: SM Entertainment; Formats: CD, digital download	2	27	KOR: 42,148+
Spring Falling	Released: April 18, 2017; Label: SM Entertainment; Formats: CD, digital download	2	42	KOR: 32,675+
Pink Magic	Released: June 18, 2019; Label: SM Entertainment; Formats: CD, digital download	4	41	KOR: 60,384+; JPN: 1,497+
Beautiful Night	Released: May 3, 2021; Label: SM Entertainment; Formats: CD, LP, cassette tape, digital download	1	17	KOR: 124,467+
Kimi to Iu Sakura no Hanabira ga Boku no Kokoro ni Maiorita (君という桜の花びらが僕の心に舞い降りた。)	Released: May 24, 2023; Label: Avex Trax; Formats: CD, digital download	—	9	JPN: 14,070+
Unfading Sense	Released: October 4, 2023; Label: SM Entertainment; Formats: CD, digital download	5	25	KOR: 69,977+; JPN: 1,902+
It's Complicated	Released: November 5, 2024; Label: SM Entertainment; Formats: CD, LP, digital download	10	—	KOR: 69,250+

== Singles ==
=== As lead artist ===
Title	Year	Peak chart positions		Sales	Album
Title	Year	KOR	JPN	Sales	Album
Korean
"Blind" (내 욕심이 많았다)	2014	56	—	—N/a	S.M. The Ballad Vol. 2 – Breath
"Here I Am" (문 열어봐)	2016	43	—	KOR: 60,777+	Here I Am
"Hibernation" (겨울잠)	2017	—	—	—N/a	Spring Falling
"Paper Umbrella" (봄날의 소나기)	2017	76	—	KOR: 23,290+	Spring Falling
"Pink Magic"	2019	— (Note: Did not enter Gaon Digital Chart but peaked at number 102 on Gaon Download Chart)	—	—N/a	Pink Magic
"Phantom Pain"	2021	—	—	—N/a	Beautiful Night
"Beautiful Night"	2021	— (Note: Did not enter Gaon Digital Chart but peaked at number 26 on Gaon Download Chart)	—	—N/a	Beautiful Night
"Small Things"	2023	— (Note: Did not enter Circle Digital Chart but peaked at number 76 on Circle Download Chart)	—	—N/a	Sensory Flows
"Floral Sense" (featuring Winter)	2023	— (Note: Did not enter Circle Digital Chart but peaked at number 62 on Circle Download Chart)	—	—N/a	Floral Sense
"Scented Things"	2023	— (Note: Did not enter Circle Digital Chart but peaked at number 130 on Circle Download Chart)	—	—N/a	Unfading Sense
"It's Complicated"	2024	— (Note: Did not enter Circle Digital Chart but peaked at number 177 on Circle Download Chart)	—	—N/a	It's Complicated
Japanese
"Ame Nochi Hare no Sora no Iro" (雨のち晴れの空の色)	2016	—	5	JPN: 23,261+	Story
"Splash"	2017	—	7	JPN: 22,575+	Story
"Aishiterutte Ienai" (愛してるって言えない)	2017	—	7	JPN: 22,575+	Story
"Because I Love You"	2019	—	—	—	Story
"Not Nightmare Christmas"	2023	—	11		Non-album single
"咲き誇る時を待つのは"	2026	—	—		咲き誇る時を待つのは

=== Collaborations ===
Title	Year	Peak chart positions		Sales	Album
Title	Year	KOR	JPN	Sales	Album
"Now We Go to Meet" (지금 만나러 가요) (with Sungmin)	2008	—	—	—N/a	Sang Geun's Wish
"I Am Behind You" (그대뒤에 있습니다.) (with Jang Hye-jin)	2011	27	—	KOR: 486,535+	Cooperation Part 1
"A Melody for You" (널 위한 멜로디) (Lee Se-joon featuring Yesung, ALi, NC.A)	2016	—	—	—N/a	Lee Se Joon 20th Anniversary
"너의 목소리 (Sound of Your Heart)" (As part of SM Town, with Steve Barakatt)	2016	—	—	—N/a	SM Station Season 1
"Darling U" (with Seulgi)	2017	—	—	—N/a	SM Station Season 1
"You Are Not Here" (너만 없다) (with ALi)	2017	—	—	—N/a	Non-album singles
"Today, a Bit More" (오늘따라 조금 더) (with Cheon Danbi)	2017	—	—	—N/a	Non-album singles
"Whatcha Doin'" (지금 어디야?) (with Chungha)	2018	— (Note: Did not enter Gaon Digital Chart but peaked at number 64 on Gaon BGM Chart Chart)	—	—N/a	Non-album singles
"Carpet" (카펫) (with Bumkey)	2019	— (Note: Did not enter Gaon Digital Chart but peaked at number 137 on Gaon BGM Chart Chart)	—	—N/a	SM Station Season 3
"Still Standing" (봄은 너니까) (with Suran)	2020	— (Note: Did not enter Gaon Digital Chart but peaked at number 87 on Gaon BGM Chart Chart)	—	—N/a	SM Station Season 4
"After Love" (with Solar)	2022	— (Note: Did not enter Circle Digital Chart but peaked at number 39 on Circle Download Chart Chart)	—	—N/a	Non-album singles
"—" denotes songs that did not chart or were not released in that region.

== Soundtrack appearances ==
Title	Year	Peak chart positions		Sales	Album
Title	Year	KOR	KOR Hot	Sales	Album
"Are You Ready?"	2007	—	—	—N/a	Attack on the Pin-Up Boys OST
"Love Really Hurts" (사랑 참 아프다)	2008	—	—	—N/a	Tazza OST
"The Trap of North Gate" (북문의 덫)	2009	—	—	—N/a	Namhansansung Musical OST
"It Has to Be You" (너 아니면 안돼)	2010	6	—	KOR: 1,822,851+	KBS Cinderella's Sister OST
"Loving You" (너를 사랑하고) (with Luna)	2010	61	—	—N/a	KBS2 The President OST
"Waiting for You" (널 기다리며)	2011	—	—	—N/a	Paradise Ranch OST
"For One Day" (단 하루만)	2011	52	—	KOR: 213,718+	Warrior Baek Dong-soo OST
"She Over Flowers" (꽃보다 그녀)	2012	65	—	KOR: 102,181+	I Do, I Do OST
"Blind For Love" (사랑에 멀어서)	2012	52	—	KOR: 79,466+	The King of Dramas OST
"Gray Paper" (먹지)	2013	16	8	KOR: 369,964+	That Winter, the Wind Blows OST
"Dreaming" (꿈을 꾸다)	2015	—	—	—N/a	Hwajung OST
"Really Miss You" (너무 그립다)	2015	—	—	—N/a	Songgot: The Piercer OST
"On My Own" (혼자 하는 일)	2018	—	—	—N/a	Should We Kiss First OST
"Draw You In My Heart" (마음에 그리다)	2019	—	—	—N/a	Flower Crew: Joseon Marriage Agency OST

== Other appearances ==
List of non-single guest appearances, showing year released and album name
Title	Year	Peak position	Album
Title	Year	KOR Down.	Album
"Happier" (with Kangta, Suho, Taeil and Renjun)	2022	121	2022 Winter SM Town: SMCU Palace

== Other charted songs ==
Title	Year	Peak chart positions	Album
Title	Year	KOR Down.	Album
"Confession" (featuring Chanyeol)	2016	86	Here I Am

== Songwriting credits ==
All song credits are adapted from the Korea Music Copyright Association's (KOMCA) database unless noted otherwise.

Year	Song	Album	Artist(s)	Lyrics		Music	
Year	Song	Album	Artist(s)	Credit	With	Credit	With
2016	"Here I Am"	Here I Am	Yesung	Yes	Brother Su	Yes	Brother Su
2016	"Confession"	Here I Am	Yesung	Yes	Brother Su	Yes	Brother Su
2016	"My Dear"	Here I Am	Yesung	Yes	Yang Jae-seon	No	
2016	"Ame Nochi Hare No Sora No Iro"	Non-album single	Yesung	No		Yes	Hwang Seung-chan, Choi Hee-jun
2016	"Gift of Love"	Non-album single	Park Si-hwan	Yes	Yoon Sa-ra	Yes	Hwang Seung-chan, Choi Hee-jun
2017	"Darling U"	Non-album single	Yesung and Seulgi	Yes	Eunhyuk	Yes	Hwang Seung-chan, Choi Hee-jun
2017	"So Close, Yet So Far"	Spring Falling	Yesung	Yes	Yoon Sa-ra	Yes	Hwang Seung-chan, Choi Hee-jun
2017	"At the Time"	Spring Falling	Yesung	Yes	Realmee, Castle	Yes	Realmee
2017	"Aishiterutte Ienai"	Splash/Aishiterutte Ienai	Yesung	Yes	Ryū Murakami	Yes	Hwang Seung-chan, Choi Hee-jun
2018	"Hug"	Replay	Super Junior	Yes	Min Yeon-jae	Yes	Phenomenotes, Kwon Doctor
2018	"Whatcha Doin'"	Non-album single	Yesung and Chung Ha	Yes	Min Yeon-jae	Yes	MZMC, Jack Wilson, Jordin Post, Luke Shipstad, Andrew Choi, Ginette Claudette
2019	"My Story"	Story	Yesung	Yes	Hasegawa, Hye Jun-zo	No	
2019	"Because I Love You"	Story	Yesung	Yes	Hideo Toyosaki	No	
2019	"If You"	Story	Yesung	Yes	Min Yeon-jae, Ume	No	
2019	"For Dream"	Story	Yesung	Yes	Min Yeon-jae, Hidenori Tanaka	No	
2019	"On that Day, I'll Love You"	Story	Yesung	Yes	Natsumi Kobayashi	No	
2019	"Dyeing Matsudan"	Story	Yesung	Yes	Min Yeon-jae, Ume	No	
2019	"Happiness"	Story	Yesung	Yes	Min Yeon-jae, Hidenori Tanaka	No	
2019	"Eat's OK"	Pink Magic	Yesung	Yes	Min Yeon-jae	Yes	Phenomenotes
2019	"Wish"	Pink Magic	Yesung	Yes	Min Yeon-jae	Yes	Phenomenotes
2020	"The Melody"	The Renaissance	Super Junior	Yes	Leeteuk, Min Yeon-jae	No	
2023	"Beautiful"	Sensory Flows	Yesung	Yes	Min Yeon-jae	Yes	Phenomenotes, Dunk
2023	"4 Seasons"	Sensory Flows	Yesung	Yes	Min Yeon-jae	No	
2023	"Together"	Sensory Flows	Yesung	Yes	Min Yeon-jae	Yes	Phenomenotes
2023	"Mother"	Floral Sense	Yesung	Yes	Min Yeon-jae	Yes	Phenomenotes
2023	"Boku wa kawarazu kimi e to mukau"	Kimi to Iu Sakura no Hanabira ga Boku no Kokoro ni Maiorita	Yesung	Yes	Hideo Toyosaki	No	
2023	"Fruit of Love"	Kimi to Iu Sakura no Hanabira ga Boku no Kokoro ni Maiorita	Yesung	Yes	Shiho Takahashi	No	
2023	"Fornever"	Unfading Sense	Yesung	Yes	Min Yeon-jae, Maryjane	No	
2023	"I Am"	Unfading Sense	Yesung	Yes	Min Yeon-jae	Yes	Phenomenotes, Dunk
2023	"Find the Sunlight"	Not Nightmare Christmas	Yesung	Yes	Mahiro	No	
2026	"咲き誇る時を待つのは (Waiting for time to bloom)"	咲き誇る時を待つのは	Yesung	Yes	ROSE BLUEMING	No	
2026	“Invincible ～また、そうやって～”	咲き誇る時を待つのは	Yesung	Yes	ROSE BLUEMING	No	
2026	“ Fire ～灰になっても、燃え付く僕ら～”	咲き誇る時を待つのは	Yesung	Yes	YUKINOS	No	
2026	“あつらえたように現れた君 ～TO GET HER～”	咲き誇る時を待つのは	Yesung	Yes	YUKINOS	No	
2026	“ 写しかがみ～憎しみの矛先～”	咲き誇る時を待つのは	Yesung	Yes	TAKAHASHI SHIHO	No	
2026	“ 僕だけが辛い一日ではないはず”	咲き誇る時を待つのは	Yesung	Yes	midoki	No	
2026	“ MAD WORLD”	咲き誇る時を待つのは	Yesung	Yes	ELVYN (NO THEORY)	No	
2026	“ Chasin’ the sun (君の速度で)”	咲き誇る時を待つのは	Yesung	Yes	足浮 梨ナコ	No	
2026	“ Shall We Dance”	咲き誇る時を待つのは	Yesung	Yes	ELVYN (NO THEORY	No	
2026	“白い星(MELO)”	咲き誇る時を待つのは	Yesung	Yes	HASEGAWA	No	

== See also ==
- Super Junior discography
- SM the Ballad discography
- Super Junior-K.R.Y. discography
