= Sensory Flows =

- Digital cover

Studio album by Yesung
- Released: January 25, 2023
- Recorded: 2022–23
- Studios: 821 Sound (Seoul); Doobdoob (Seoul); Golden Bell Tree Sound (Seoul); Ingrid (Seoul); Prelude (Seoul); Seoul; SM LVYIN (Seoul); SM SSAM (Seoul); SM Starlight (Seoul); SM Yellow Tail (Seoul); T (Seoul)
- Genres: Indie pop; R&B; Jazz-pop
- Length: 36:58; 48:43 (Floral Sense repackage)
- Language: Korean
- Labels: SM; Label SJ; Dreamus
- Producer: Lee Soo-man

Yesung chronology
Beautiful Night (2021)	Sensory Flows (2023)	Kimi to Iu Sakura no Hanabira ga Boku no Kokoro ni Maiorita (2023)

Singles from Sensory Flows
- 1. "Small Things" Released: January 25, 2023

Repackaged edition cover
- Digital cover

Singles from Floral Sense - The 1st Album (Special Version)
- 1. "Floral Sense" Released: February 27, 2023

Music video
- "Small Things" on YouTube
- "Floral Sense" on YouTube

Sensory Flows is the first Korean studio album by South Korean singer Yesung. The album was released on January 25, 2023, by labels SM Entertainment and Label SJ. The album features ten tracks in total. The album was then re-released as Floral Sense on February 27, 2023, with three additional tracks.

The album is the last album to be released under Label SJ, as subsequent Super Junior group or solo releases were handled by Wizard Production as part of the SM 3.0 development plan.

== Background ==
Previously, Yesung had released four Korean mini-albums — Here I Am (2016), Spring Falling (2017), and Pink Magic (2019), and Beautiful Night (2021), but yet to release a full length album. He stated that he had been preparing for Sensory Flows, and Floral Sense for a long time.

On January 2, 2023, it was reported that Yesung was preparing to release a new album. Label SJ later confirmed the report that Yesung would release a studio album by the end of the month.

On January 9, it was announced that the album is scheduled to be released on January 25, at 6 PM KST. On January 13, the highlight medley for the album was uploaded on Super Junior's YouTube channel.

The music video for the lead single, "Small Things", was released alongside the album on January 25.

A month later on February 27, the album was re-released as Floral Sense, including the titular track with the same name, featuring Winter of Aespa. Additionally, the album featured Yesung's solo version of the song, and a self-written track, "Mother". Yesung states that Sensory Flows expressed his sensibilities for the fans, while Floral Sense was the emphasis of his blooming sensibilities.

== Composition ==
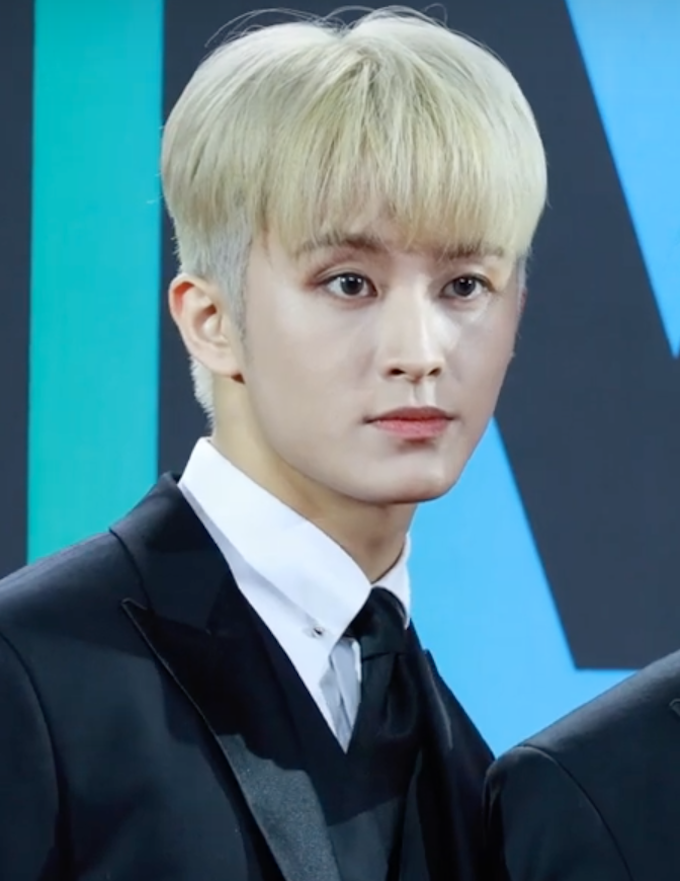
Mark is featured on "HO", where he also contributed to the lyrics

Yesung experimented with various genres in Sensory Flows and its repackage, ranging from Indie pop, R&B, and Jazz-pop

The lyrics of "Small Things" talk about simple emotions and stories that make everyday life worthwhile. Speaking on an interview Kim Shin-young, Yesung revealed the titular track felt stylistically suited for him and adding that the song feels sophisticated.

"All Night Long" is described as a song that lies between synth-pop and Lo-fi music, with the lyrics narrating to those who are still waiting for their lovers for a long time.

"Like Us" (not to be confused with the song with the same title from the previous album), is a city pop song written by Nokdu with whom Yesung had collaborated before. Its lyrics convey the state of the heart of starting love.

"Beautiful" is a song penned by Yesung and Min Yeon-jae, taking an inspiration from the former's dislike of noisy place when travelling. Yesung recounted the inspiration of writing the song came during his trip to Seocheon County and Namhae County.

"HO", is an R&B-jazz song featuring Mark of NCT's rap lines with warm guitar song and piano as its music.

"Bear Hug" as suggested on the title, narrates the longing for comfort. "4 Seasons" is another jazz song featured in the album, with its lyrics encouraging the listeners to reminisce about good times with their loved ones and look forward to the next meeting.

"Moment" is a soul ballad with vintage melodies and warm acoustic complemented with lyrics of unchanged feelings to another despite not meeting for a long time.

The penultimate track is "Mermaid", another ballad of the album is a melancholic song with its lyrics narrating the desire to be with someone only for them to realize they are stuck in fantasy.

The original album concludes with "Together", an easy listening song that talks about pets.

The reissued album features three additional songs — "Floral Sense" (featuring Winter), "Mother", and the solo version of "Floral Sense." "Floral Sense" is an indie pop song that talks about emotional identity.

== Track listing ==
Sensory Flows track listing
No.	Title	Lyrics	Music	Arrangement	Length
1.	"Small Things"	Daniel Kim	Daniel Kim	Daniel Kim	3:22
2.	"All Night Long"	Song Eun-suk	Song Eun-suk	Song Eun-suk	3:16
3.	"Like Us (Sensory Flows)" (같아 우리; Gata uri; 'Same as us')	Nokdu	Nokdu	Nokdu	3:42
4.	"Beautiful" (아름다워; Areumdawo)	Yesung; Min Yeon-jae	Phenomenotes; Dunk; Yesung	Phenomenotes; Dunk	3:30
5.	"HO" (featuring Mark)	Mark; Kass	Kass	Kass	3:37
6.	"Bear Hug"	Daniel Kim	Daniel Kim	Daniel Kim	4:17
7.	"4 Seasons"	Yesung; Min Yeon-jae	Sarah Kang	Sarah Kang; Patrick Hizon	3:38
8.	"Moment"	Leeseon (Music Cube); Ayul; Bymore	Bymore; Ayul; Leeseon (Music Cube)	Bymore	3:50
9.	"Mermaid" (환상; Hwansang; 'Fantasy')	Park Su-bin (Jam Factory)	Realmeee; Etham; Hautboi Rich	Realmeee; Etham; Hautboi Rich	3:28
10.	"Together" (우리의 시간; Uriui sigan; 'Our time')	Yesung; Min Yeon-jae	Phenomenotes; Yesung	Dunk	4:13
Total length:					36:58

Floral Sense – repackaged
No.	Title	Lyrics	Music	Arrangement	Length
1.	"Floral Sense" (featuring Winter)	Daniel Kim	Daniel Kim	Daniel Kim	3:48
2.	"Mother" (그대에게; Geudaeege; 'To you')	Yesung; Min Yeon-jae	Phenomenotes; Yesung	Phenomenotes	4:08
3.	"Small Things"	Daniel Kim	Daniel Kim	Daniel Kim	3:22
4.	"All Night Long"	Song Eun-suk	Song Eun-suk	Song Eun-suk	3:16
5.	"Like Us (Sensory Flows)" (같아 우리; Gata uri; 'Same as us')	Nokdu	Nokdu	Nokdu	3:42
6.	"Beautiful" (아름다워; Areumdawo)	Yesung; Min Yeon-jae	Phenomenotes; Dunk; Yesung	Phenomenotes; Dunk	3:30
7.	"HO" (featuring Mark)	Mark; Kass	Kass	Kass	3:37
8.	"Bear Hug"	Daniel Kim	Daniel Kim	Daniel Kim	4:17
9.	"4 Seasons"	Yesung; Min Yeon-jae	Sarah Kang	Sarah Kang; Patrick Hizon	3:38
10.	"Moment"	Leeseon (Music Cube); Ayul; Bymore	Bymore; Ayul; Leeseon (Music Cube)	Bymore	3:50
11.	"Mermaid" (환상; Hwansang; 'Fantasy')	Park Su-bin (Jam Factory)	Realmeee; Etham; Hautboi Rich	Realmeee; Etham; Hautboi Rich	3:28
12.	"Together" (우리의 시간; Uriui sigan; 'Our time')	Yesung; Min Yeon-jae	Phenomenotes; Yesung	Dunk	4:13
13.	"Floral Sense" (Solo version)	Daniel Kim	Daniel Kim	Daniel Kim	3:48
Total length:					48:43

== Charts ==
Chart performance for Sensory Flows
Chart (2023)	Peak position
South Korean Albums (Circle)	4
Japan (Oricon)	23

Chart performance for Floral Sense
Chart (2023)	Peak position
South Korean Albums (Circle)	27
Japan (Oricon)	35

== Release history ==
Release history for Sensory Flows
Region	Date	Version	Format	Label
South Korea	January 25, 2023	Sensory Flows	CD	SM; Label SJ; Dreamus
Various	January 25, 2023	Sensory Flows	Digital download; streaming	SM; Label SJ
South Korea	February 27, 2023	Floral Sense	CD; LP	SM; Label SJ; Dreamus
Various	February 27, 2023	Floral Sense	Digital download; streaming	SM; Label SJ

== See also ==
- Yesung discography
