= Beautiful Night =

Beautiful Night may refer to:

- "Beautiful Night" (Paul McCartney song), 1997
- "Beautiful Night" (Beverley Knight song), 2009
- Beautiful Night (EP), a 2021 EP by Yesung
- "Beautiful Night" (Yesung song), a 2021 single by Yesung from the EP of the same name.
- Burden Brothers (EP), also known as the Beautiful Night EP
