= Splash (Yesung song) =

- CD+DVD cover

Single by Yesung

from the album Story
- Language: Japanese
- A-side: "Aishiterutte Ienai"
- Released: June 28, 2017
- Recorded: 2017
- Studio: In Grid (Seoul); Seoul
- Genre: Dance-pop; pop ballad
- Length: 3:09
- Label: Avex Trax
- Composers: Donna; Ricky; CuzD (Clef Crew)
- Lyricist: Hidenori Tanaka
- Producers: Nam So-young; Ryuhei Chiba

Yesung singles chronology
"Paper Umbrella" (2017)	"Splash" (2017)	"Whatcha Doin'" (2018)

Music video
- "Splash" on YouTube

"Splash" is a Japanese song recorded by South Korean singer-songwriter Yesung. It was released as a double A-side with "Aishiterutte Ienai" on June 28, 2017, by Avex Trax.

Both songs were later featured on his debut Japanese studio album, Story, which was released in 2019.

== Background ==
"Splash" and "Aishiterutte Ienai" is Yesung's second Japanese single following "雨のち晴れの空の色 (Ame Nochi Hare no Sora no Iro)" which was released in October 2016.

On May 16, 2017, Yesung announced he will release his second Japanese single "Splash/Aishiterutte Ienai" on June 28. On May 25, Yesung announced he was in Macau to film the music video for "Splash". The promotional video was released exclusively on June 1, showing close-up footage and interviews.

== Composition ==
Unlike his previous solo releases like "Here I Am" and "Paper Umbrella" which were ballads, "Splash" is categorized as a dance-pop song, while "Aishiterutte Ienai" is also a ballad.

Yesung introduced "Splash" as a typical Super Junior dance number with the image of early summer.

Novelist Ryū Murakami was credited as the lyricist for the latter track and said he wrote the lyrics in 10 minutes and added how he words "I love you" was actually more complex and deeper than it seems. Yesung was surprised that Murakami could provide the lyrics and commented how mature the song is.

== Live performances ==
Shortly after the release of the single, Yesung embarked on a series of small live concerts across Japan called "Y's Song", visiting cities such as Yokohama and Nagoya from June 30 to July 5.

== Track listing ==
Digital edition and CD only track listing
No.	Title	Lyrics	Music	Arrangement	Length
1.	"Splash"	Hidenori Tanaka	Donna; Ricky; CuzD (Clef Crew)	Donna; Ricky; CuzD (Clef Crew)	3:09
2.	"I Cannot Say I Love You" (愛してるって言えない (Aishiteru tte ienai))	Ryu Murakami	Yesung; Choi Hee-jun; Hwang Seung-chan	Choi Hee-jun; Hwang Sung-chan	3:35
3.	"Splash" (Instrumental)		Donna; Ricky; CuzD (Clef Crew)	Donna; Ricky; CuzD (Clef Crew)	3:09
4.	"I Cannot Say I Love You" (愛してるって言えない (Aishiteru tte ienai) instrumental)		Yesung; Choi Hee-jun; Hwang Seung-chan	Choi Hee-jun; Hwang Sung-chan	3:35
Total length:					13:32

DVD track listing
No.	Title	Length
1.	"Splash (MV)"
2.	"Splash (MV & Jacket Making)"

E.L.F.-Japan Edition
No.	Title	Lyrics	Music	Arrangement	Length
1.	"Let Me Kiss"	Hidenori Tanaka	Andreas Öberg; Jany Schella; Octobar	Öberg; Schella; Octobar
2.	"Between"	Shin Agnes; Hwang Hyun (MonoTree)	Kim Yoo-seok; Chu Dae-kwan (MonoTree)	Kim Yoo-seok; Chu Dae-kwan (MonoTree)
3.	"Confession" (어떤 말로도; Eotteon mallodo; 'In no words')	Yesung; Brother Su	Yesung; Brother Su	Hwang Seong-je
4.	"Here I Am" (문 열어봐; Mun yeoreobwa; 'Open the door')	Yesung; Brother Su	Yesung; Brother Su	Eco Bridge
5.	"My Dear" (달의 노래; Darui norae; 'Song of the Moon')	Yesung; Yang Jae-seon	이방원사단	이방원사단
6.	"Sorry, Sorry-Answer"	Yoo Young-jin	Yoo	Yoo
7.	"Way for Love" (차근차근; Chageunchageun; 'carefully')	Feel; Lee Yoon-jae	Lee	Hwang Seong-je
8.	"This Is Love"	Kim Hee-chul; Kim Ji-won; Jo Yoon-kyung	Kim Ji-hoo; Park Seul-gi; Lola Fair; Nermin Harambašić	Kim Ji-hoo; Park; Lola Fair; Harambašić
9.	"Mamacita"	Yoo	Yoo; Teddy Riley; Dominique "DOM" Rodriguez; Lee Hyun-seung; Jason J. "JSol" Lopez	Riley; Rodriguez; Lee
10.	"Opera"	Kenzie	Thomas Troelsen; Engelina Larsen	Kenzie
11.	"Join Hands"	Sara Sakurai	Fredrik Hult; Andreas Stone Johansson; Öberg; Steven Lee	Hult; Johansson; Öberg; Lee
12.	"Sky Color of Rain" (The color of the sunny sky after the rain (雨のち晴れの空の色, Ame nochi hare no sora no iro))	Hajime Watanabe; Yesung	Choi Hee-jun; Hwang Seung-chan	Choi Hee-jun; Hwang Seung-chan
13.	"SUPER Junior-Yesung Japan Tour 2016 -BOOKS- -Making-"

== Charts ==
=== Weekly chart ===
Chart (2017)	Peak position
Japan (Oricon)	7

=== Monthly chart ===
Chart (2017)	Peak position
Japan (Oricon)	22

== Credits and personnel ==
Credits adapted from the single and album's liner notes.

Studio

- In Grid Studio – recording (1, 2), digital editing (2), mixing (2)
- Seoul Studio – recording (1)
- Victor Studio Tokyo – digital editing (1, 2), mixing (1)
- SM Concert Hall Studio – mixing (2)
- Flair Mastering Works – mastering
- Parasight Mastering – mastering

Personnel

- Max Matsuura – executive producer
- Lee Soo-man – executive producer
- Shinji Hayashi – executive supervisor
- Katsumi Kuroiwa – executive supervisor
- Nam So-young – producer
- Ryuhei Chiba – producer
- Yesung – vocals, Korean lyrics (2), composition (2)
- Donna – composition, arrangement (1)
- Ricky – composition, arrangement (1)
- CuzD (Clef Crew) – composition, arrangement (1)
- Hidenori Tanaka – lyrics (1), vocal direction (1)
- Ryū Murakami – lyrics (2)
- Choi Hee-jun – composition (2)
- Hwang Sung-chan – composition (2)
- Kang Tae-woo – background vocals (2)
- Shigeru Tanida – digital editing (1, 2), mixing (1, 2)
- Jung Eun-kyung – recording (1, 2), digital editing (2), mixing (2)
- Jung Ki-hong – recording (2)
- Koong Jin-nam – mixing (2)
- Yoong string – string (2)
- Shin Min – string arrangement (2)
- Kazushige Yamazaki – mastering
- Hiromichi Takiguchi – mastering

== Release history ==
Release history for "Splash/Aishiterutte Ienai"
Region	Date	Version	Format	Label	Ref
Japan	June 28, 2017	Standard	CD single; DVD single	Avex Trax	
Japan	June 28, 2017	E.L.F.-Japan Edition	CD single; DVD	Avex Trax	
Various	June 28, 2017	Standard	Digital download; streaming	Avex Trax	
South Korea	July 21, 2017	Standard	Digital download; streaming	SM; Label SJ; Genie	
