= Small Things =

Single by Yesung

from the album Sensory Flows
- Language: Korean
- Released: January 25, 2023
- Recorded: 2022
- Studio: Doobdoob (Seoul); SM LVYIN (Seoul); SM Yellow Tail (Seoul)
- Genre: Indie pop
- Length: 3:23
- Label: SM; Label SJ; Dreamus
- Composer: Daniel Kim
- Lyricist: Daniel Kim
- Producer: Daniel Kim

Yesung singles chronology
"After Love" (2022)	"Small Things" (2023)	"Floral Sense" (2023)

Music video
- "Small Things" on YouTube

"Small Things" is a song recorded by South Korean singer-songwriter Yesung. It was released on January 25, 2023, as the lead single off his debut studio album, Sensory Flows, by labels SM Entertainment and Label SJ, with Dreamus handling the distribution.

== Background ==
Following the release of Super Junior's 11th studio album, The Renaissance on March 16, 2021, Yesung released his fourth EP, Beautiful Night with the lead single of the same name. The EP was a commercial success, ranking first in Gaon Album Chart, with over 120,000 copies sold.

In 2022, Yesung, as a member of Super Junior released single album, The Road: Winter for Spring in February and releasing their 12th studio album, The Road in July. He immediately went on a world tour with the group through Super Show 9: Road to promote the album and performed "Corazón Perdido (Lost Heart)", a song from the EP.

In October, Yesung collaborated with Solar of Mamamoo for the single "After Love", a remake of the 2006 version.

On January 2, 2023, Label SJ announced that Yesung would have a solo comeback with his first studio album. A week later, Sensory Flows was announced as the name of the album and the label confirmed Yesung was involved in planning and the record production.

On January 14, Label SJ uploaded the highlight medley of the album, and "Small Things" was announced as the lead single of the album.

The song and its music video were released on the same day as the album on January 25.

== Composition ==
"Small Things" is an indie pop song that was produced, written, and composed by Daniel Kim that talks about simple emotions and stories that make everyday life worthwhile. Speaking on an interview Kim Shin-young, Yesung revealed the titular track felt stylistically suited for him and adding that the song feels sophisticated.

Through the release, Label SJ hoped that an indie pop release would bring joy to global listeners.

The song was arranged in the key of B Major with the tempo of 142 beats per minute.

== Music video ==
The music video shows Yesung fall for a woman (played by Kim Ji-woo) over the shared love for music.

== Promotions ==
Yesung first performed "Small Things" during his appearance on Music Bank on January 27. Two days later, he performed the song on Inkigayo and Show! Music Core on the 30th, where he performed with a live band.

The song would be included in the setlist of Yesung's solo concerts "Unfading Sense" later that year and "It's Complicated", in 2025.

== Charts ==
Chart (2023)	Peak position
South Korea Downloads (Circle)	76

== Credits ==
Credits adapted from album's liner notes.

Studio

- Doobdoob Studio – recording
- SM LVYIN Studio – recording
- SM Yellow Tail Studio – recording, engineered for mix
- SM Blue Ocean Studio – mixing
- 821 Sound Mastering – mastering

Personnel

- SM Entertainment – executive supervisor
- Label SJ – executive producer
- Lee Soo-man – producer
- Daniel Kim – producer, lyrics, composition, arrangement, synthesizer, other instruments, programming, background vocals
- Yesung – vocals
- Jeon Sung-woo – background vocals
- Noh Min-ji – recording, mixing
- Lee Ji-hong – recording
- Kim Hyun-gon – recording
- Lee Jung-bin – recording
- Kim Chul-soon – mixing
- Kwon Nam-woo – mastering

== Release history ==
Release history for "Small Things"
Region	Date	Format	Label
South Korea	January 25, 2023	Digital download; streaming	SM; Label SJ; Dreamus
Various	January 25, 2023	Digital download; streaming	SM; Label SJ
