= Unfading Sense =

- Digital cover

EP by Yesung
- Released: October 4, 2023
- Recorded: 2023
- Studio: Golden Bell Tree Sound (Seoul); InGrid (Seoul); JM (Seoul); SM LVYIN (Seoul); SM SSAM (Seoul); SM Starlight (Seoul); SM Yellow Tail (Seoul)
- Genre: Indie pop; pop; R&B
- Length: 20:54
- Language: Korean
- Label: SM; Kakao
- Producer: Daniel Kim; Greenism; Borr; Arown Wyne; Glen Check; Dunk; Phenomenotes

Yesung chronology
Kimi to Iu Sakura no Hanabira ga Boku no Kokoro ni Maiorita (2023)	Unfading Sense (2023)	It's Complicated (2024)

Singles from Unfading Sense
- 1. "Scented Things" Released: October 4, 2023

Unfading Sense is the fifth Korean EP by South Korean singer Yesung. It was released by SM Entertainment and distributed by Kakao Entertainment on October 4, 2023. The release is Yesung's third comeback in 2023 following his debut Korean studio album, Sensory Flows and his debut Japanese EP. The EP is supported by lead single "Scented Things" which was released on the same day as the EP.

== Background ==
At the beginning of 2023, Yesung released his debut Korean studio album, Sensory Flows in January followed by its repackage, Floral Sense the following month. In May, he released his first Japanese EP, Kimi to Iu Sakura no Hanabira ga Boku no Kokoro ni Maiorita.

On September 14, SM Entertainment announced that Yesung will conclude the "Sensory Series" with the release of EP Unfading Sense on October 4. The promotion schedule of the EP was released on September 18. On the following day, SM Entertainment announced that Yesung will hold a solo concert on October 21 and 22 at the Yes24 Live Hall in Gwangjin-gu, Seoul. "Scented Things" was announced as the lead single of the EP on September 25.

On October 2, SM uploaded a highlight medley of the songs and released the music video teaser for "Scented Things" on the 3rd. The EP was released on October 4 in digital and physical forms with the music video uploaded online on the same day.

== Composition ==
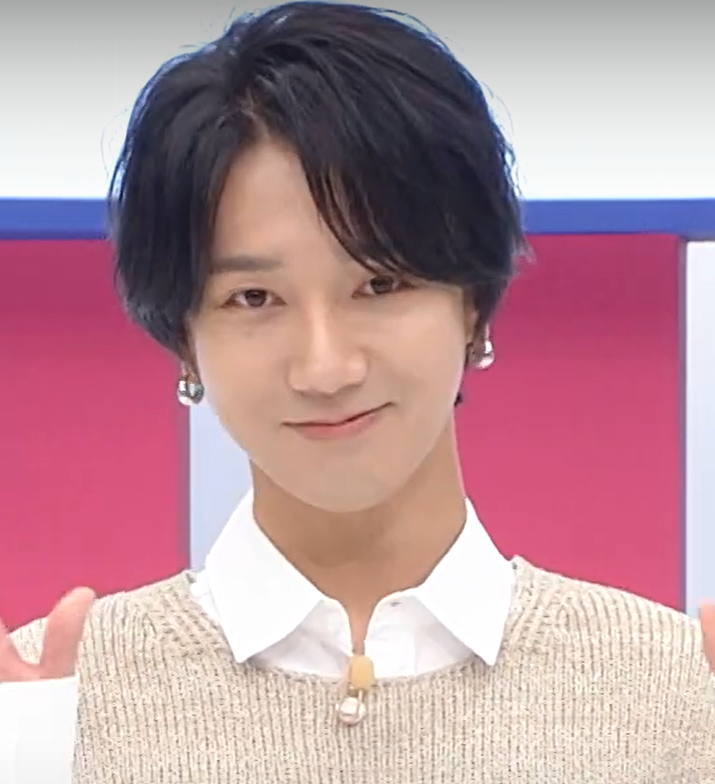
Yesung (pictured in 2021) is involved in penning the lyrics for two songs in this EP

Unfading Sense contains six songs that include indie pop, pop, and R&B.

The EP begins with titular track "Scented Things", an indie pop song with acoustic sound filled with lyrics that tell feelings that bloom with experience remain everywhere like a scent and never wither. The song is penned, composed, and arranged by Daniel Kim, who also wrote previous lead singles, "Small Things" and "Floral Sense". Upon hearing the song for the first time, Yesung felt good and commented that the song is suitable to enjoy during autumn.

The second track is "Silhouette", a pop ballad with warm harmonies composed by guitarist and producer Greenism, Son-woo, Borr, and TSLW. The lyrics were penned by the former two as it express longing for the other person in a shimmering silhouette.

The third track "Fornever" is another pop ballad on the EP. The track's music is a melancholic piano and guitar composed by Swedish singer-songwriter, Winona Oak, along with Aron Wyme, and Juliander. Penned by Yesung, Min Yeon-jae, and Maryjane, the lyrics narrate the dream of eternal love that is not eternal. Yesung recalled matching the Korean lyrics with its original English demo.

"Butterfly" is the second indie pop song of the EP. South Korean electronica and indie band Glen Check entirely wrote the lyrics, composed the music, and arranged the song. The song is relaxed despite its lyrics narrate the desperations of having a crush on someone.

"Slide Away" is an alternative rock song written, composed, and arranged by Daniel Kim. The lyrics expressed the desire to go anywhere in search of happiness with the person you love. Yesung mentioned this song as his favorite and would have picked this song as the title track had the album was released in summer.

The last song is "I Am", a funky and rhythmic R&B song composed by Phenomenotes, Dunk, and Yesung. The lyrics, penned by Yesung and Min Yeon-jae aims to uplift the listener's morale by reminding them the person they can ultimately cherish and trust the most is themself.

== Commercial performance ==
Unfading Sense peaked at no. 25 in the Oricon's Japanese Albums chart and No. 5 in Circle Chart's South Korean Albums.

== Promotion ==
Yesung held his first solo Korean concert in October 21 and 22, around six years and five months from his last Korean concert where he promoted his second EP, Spring Falling. The songs from the EP and from Sensory Flows is included as part of his first Asia tour, Yesung Solo Concert - Unfading Sense.

== Track listing ==
Unfading Sense track listing
No.	Title	Lyrics	Music	Arrangement	Length
1.	"Scented Things"	Daniel Kim	Daniel Kim	Daniel Kim	4:20
2.	"Silhouette"	Greenism; Son-woo	Borr; Greenism; TSLW; Son-woo	Borr	3:02
3.	"Fornever"	Min Yeon-jae; Maryjane; Yesung	Winona Oak; Aron Wyme; Juliander	Aron Wyme	2:31
4.	"Butterfly"	Glen Check	Glen Check	Glen Check	3:17
5.	"Slide Away"	Daniel Kim	Daniel Kim	Daniel Kim	4:01
6.	"I Am" (나; Na; 'Me')	Yesung; Min Yeon-jae	Phenomenotes; Dunk; Yesung	Dunk; Phenomenotes	3:38
Total length:					20:54

== Charts ==
Chart performance for Unfading Sense
Chart (2023)	Peak position
Japanese Albums (Oricon)	25
South Korean Albums (Circle)	5

== Release history ==
Release history for Unfading Sense
Region	Date	Version	Format	Label	Ref
South Korea	October 4, 2023	Standard	CD	SM; Kakao	
South Korea	October 4, 2023	Fade In	CD	SM; Kakao	
South Korea	October 4, 2023	Fade Out	CD	SM; Kakao	
South Korea	October 4, 2023	Tape	Cassette	SM; Kakao	
South Korea	October 4, 2023	Special Version	CD	SM; Kakao	
Various	October 4, 2023	Standard	Digital download; streaming	SM	
South Korea	January 31, 2024	LP	LP	SM; Kakao	
