= Paper Umbrella =

Single by Yesung

from the EP Spring Falling
- Language: Korean
- Released: April 18, 2017
- Recorded: 2017
- Studio: CSMUSIC (Seoul); Lead (Seoul); SM LVYIN (Seoul)
- Genre: K-ballad
- Length: 4:09
- Label: SM; Label SJ; KT
- Composer: 1601
- Lyricist: Seo Ji-eum
- Producer: 1601

Yesung singles chronology
"Hibernation" (2017)	"Paper Umbrella" (2017)	"Splash" (2017)

Music video
- "Paper Umbrella" on YouTube

"Paper Umbrella" (Korean: 봄날의 소나기; RR: Bomnarui sonagi; lit. '"Spring shower"') is a song recorded by South Korean singer-songwriter Yesung for his second EP, Spring Falling. It was released on April 18, 2017, by SM Entertainment and Label SJ, and distributed by KT Music.

== Background ==
At the beginning of 2017, Yesung starred as Oh Hyun-ho in OCN drama, Voice. On March 31, Label SJ announced that Yesung is preparing for a comeback in April, a year after the release of his debut EP, Here I Am.

"Paper Umbrella" was announced as the lead single during the EP's name reveal on April 12, with the pre-release single "Hibernation" being released on the same day. The song was introduced as a K-ballad song with piano as its accompanying instrument. Two days later, the teaser for the music video was uploaded with actress Shin Hyun-been featured as its female protagonist.

The song and its music video were released alongside the EP on the 18th.

== Composition ==
"Paper Umbrella" is a mournful ballad song with piano and strings arrangement. The lyrics were penned by Seo Ji-eum, narrating the moment where a memory of a person one broke up as a rain pouring down with a paper umbrella to no avail.

== Music video ==
The music video featured Yesung, Shin and SM Rookies' Jungwoo (who would go on to debut with NCT) and Koeun, telling the story of love and separation by generation.

== Live performances ==
Yesung performed the song in You Hee-yeol's Sketchbook during its April 18 taping alongside the R&B arrangement of Super Junior's "Sorry, Sorry", which aired on the 21st. Yesung sang the song live for the first time on April 20 during an appearance at M Countdown. On April 21, he performed the song on Music Bank. Performances on Show! Music Core and Inkigayo followed on the 22nd and 23rd, respectively.

On May 13 and 14, the song was featured on the set list for Yesung's "Spring" concert at Samsung Card Hall, in Seoul. It was performed on "SM Town Live World Tour VI" in Kyocera Dome Osaka in July.

== Charts ==
Chart (2017)	Peak position
South Korea (Gaon)	76

== Release history ==
Release history for "Paper Umbrella"
Region	Date	Format	Label
South Korea	April 18, 2017	Digital download; streaming	SM; Label SJ; KT
Various	April 18, 2017	Digital download; streaming	SM; Label SJ
