= Pink Magic (song) =

Single by Yesung

from the EP Pink Magic
- Language: Korean
- Released: June 18, 2019
- Recorded: 2019
- Studio: SM LVYIN (Seoul)
- Genre: K-pop
- Length: 3:15
- Label: SM; Label SJ; Dreamus
- Composers: Jake K; Nico Stadi; Teemu Brunila; Hailey Collier; Ryan S. Jhun
- Lyricists: Choi Hee-jung; Min Yeon-jae; January 8th
- Producers: Jake K; Nico Stadi; Ryan S. Jhun

Yesung singles chronology
"Carpet" (2019)	"Pink Magic" (2019)	"Still Standing" (2020)

Music video
- "Pink Magic" on YouTube

"Pink Magic" is a song recorded by South Korean singer-songwriter Yesung as the lead single of his third EP of the same name. It was released on June 18, 2019, by SM and Label SJ, and distributed by Dreamus.

== Background ==
Yesung began 2019 by releasing "Carpet" a collaboration with Bumkey for the third SM Station project, in January. He resumed Super Junior activities with the encore concert series "Super Show 7S" which began on March 2 and 3 at KSPO Dome. On May 30, Label SJ announced that Yesung is set for a solo comeback in early to mid-June and added that he was filming the music video and finalizing the album.

On June 10, Label SJ announced the title of the EP would be called Pink Magic which would be released on the 18th, marking Yesung's first Korean comeback in two years following Spring Falling.

Three days later, "Pink Magic" was announced as the lead single of the EP and its music video was scheduled to be released on the same day as the EP. A teaser music video was released the following day, featuring cameo from bandmates Donghae and Kyuhyun. The single was released digitally alongside its music video on July 18.

== Composition ==
"Pink Magic" was composed by Jake K, Nico Stadi, Teemu Brunila, Hailey Collier, and Ryan S. Jhun, and they arrange the song in the key of F# major with the tempo of 118 beats per minute. It was described as rhythmic pop song with bouncy synth sounds and uplifting guitar groove.

The lyrics were penned by Choi Hee-jung, Min Yeon-jae, and January 8th, confessing joy from a lover throughout the song, which was captured as a magical story.

== Music video ==
The music video was released on July 18, showing different charms of Yesung who is in love. It also featured cameo from bandmates Donghae and Kyuhyun with humorous facial expressions.

== Live performances ==
Yesung held a fan event at Ilji Art Hall in Seoul on July 18, promoting the single for the first time in front of fans. He later appeared on July 7's Inkigayo program to perform the song.

The song was featured on the setlist of Yesung's 2025 concert "It's Complicated" alongside other hits.

== Chart ==
Chart (2019)	Peak position
South Korea Downloads (Gaon)	102

== Credits ==
Credits adapted from EP's liner notes.

Studio

- SM LVYIN Studio – recording
- SM Big Shot Studio – digital audio editing
- SM SSAM Studio – engineered for mix
- SM Concert Hall Studio – mixing
- Sterling Sound – mastering

Personnel

- SM Entertainment – executive supervisor
- Label SJ – executive producer
- Tak Young-jun – producer
- Jake K – producer, composition, arrangement, synthesizer, bass, programming
- Nico Stadi – producer, composition, arrangement
- Ryan S. Jhun – producer, composition, arrangement
- Teemu Brunila – composition, arrangement
- Hailey Collier – composition, arrangement
- Choi Hee-jun – lyrics
- Min Yeon-jae – lyrics
- January 8th – lyrics
- Yesung – vocals, background vocals
- Hwang Sung-jae – background vocals, digital audio editing
- Seo Mi-rae – background vocals, digital audio editing
- Butterfly – vocal direction
- Kim Chul-soon – recording
- Noh Min-ji – mixing
- Nam Koong-jin – mixing
- Chris Gehringer – mastering

== Release history ==
Release history for "Pink Magic"
Region	Date	Format	Label
South Korea	June 18, 2019	Digital download; streaming	SM; Label SJ; Dreamus
Various	June 18, 2019	Digital download; streaming	SM; Label SJ
