= Kimi to Iu Sakura no Hanabira ga Boku no Kokoro ni Maiorita =

- Digital/Regular cover

EP by Yesung
- Released: May 24, 2023
- Recorded: 2023
- Studio: 821 Sound (Seoul); In Grid (Seoul)
- Genre: J-pop; rock; city pop
- Length: 22:12
- Language: Japanese
- Label: Avex Trax
- Producer: Yesung; Shinji Hayashi; Kim Dong-woo

Yesung chronology
Sensory Flows (2023)	Kimi to Iu Sakura no Hanabira ga Boku no Kokoro ni Maiorita (2023)	Unfading Sense (2023)

Singles from Kimi to Iu Sakura no Hanabira ga Boku no Kokoro ni Maiorita
- 1. "C.h.a.o.s.m.y.t.h" Released: May 10, 2023; 2. "Fleeting Love" Released: May 24, 2023

Music video
- "Fleeting Love" on YouTube

Kimi to Iu Sakura no Hanabira ga Boku no Kokoro ni Maiorita' (君という桜の花びらが僕の心に舞い降りた。 (lit. 'You, the cherry blossom petal, has fallen into my heart.')) is the first Japanese EP by South Korean singer-songwriter Yesung. It was released on May 24, 2023, by Avex Trax.

Consisting of six tracks, this was his first Japanese comeback since the release of the studio album Story in 2019, and the second comeback in 2023.

== Background ==
On January 25, 2023, Yesung released Sensory Flows, his first Korean studio album since his solo debut in 2016. The album was reissued as Floral Sense on February 27, while he toured with Super Junior for Super Show 9: Road.

On May 9, SM Entertainment announced that Yesung will have a Japanese comeback with the EP Kimi to Iu Sakura no Hanabira ga Boku no Kokoro ni Maiorita, on May 24, with pre-release cover single "C.h.a.o.s.my.t.h" by One Ok Rock released on the midnight of the following day. Billboard Japan reported that the jacket photo for the EP was done by graphic artist Koichi Yairi.

On May 23, Mystic Story confirmed Billlie's Tsuki's appearance in one of the songs. The album was released on May 24 in both physical and digital format, along with a tour announcement to promote the EP. The music video for lead single "Fleeting Love" was released on the same day.

== Composition ==
The EP contains six tracks with a wide range of genres: J-pop, J-rock, and city pop.

== Promotions ==
"Fleeting Love" was selected as the opening track for the June season of TV Asahi's Break Out. Yesung then embarked on a Japanese tour of the same name from June to July. On July 13, he appeared as a guest in Ano-chan's Electric Wave where he and Ano played games, before he performed "Fleeting Love" at the end of the show.

== Track listing ==
No.	Title	Lyrics	Music	Arrangement	Length
1.	"Fleeting Love" (束の間の恋 (Tsukanoma no koi))	Cony; Sayaka Inoue	Cony; Sayaka Inoue	Cony	3:19
2.	"僕は変わらず君へと向かう" (Boku wa kawarazu kimi e to mukau (lit. 'I'll always head towards you') (featuring Tsuki of Billlie)	Yesung; Hideo Toyosaki	Hyuk Shin (153/Joombas); Park Seul-gi (153/Joombas); Moon Kim (153/Joombas); Jeff Lewis(153/Joombas); JJ Evans (153/ Joombas); Ashley Alisha (153/Joombas)	Park Seul-gi; Moon Kim	3:21
3.	"Make It Summer"	Hideo Toyosaki	2Champ; All Day; On; Firben	2Champ; All Day; On; Firben	3:41
4.	"Fruit of Love"	Yesung; Shiho Takahashi	Oliver Forsmark; Hugo Johnning; Christoffer Collins	Oliver Forsmark; Hugo Johnning; Christoffer Collins	3:17
5.	"エピローグ" (Epirōgu (lit. 'Epilogue'))	Erika Yamaguchi (Core Creative)	Etham; Hautboi Rich; Conran Yan Williams Lee; Rhett Yan Williams Lee; Shaun Farrugia		3:14
6.	"C.h.a.o.s.m.y.t.h."	Takahiro Moriuchi	Takahiro Moriuchi; Toru Yamashita; Ryota Kohama; Tomoya Kanki	Takahiro Moriuchi; Toru Yamashita; Ryota Kohama; Tomoya Kanki; Akkin	5:18
Total length:					22:12

== Charts ==
Chart performance for Kimi to Iu Sakura no Hanabira ga Boku no Kokoro ni Maiorita
Chart (2023)	Peak position
Japan (Oricon)	9
Japan (Billboard Japan)	7

== Release history ==
Release history for Kimi to Iu Sakura no Hanabira ga Boku no Kokoro ni Maiorita
Region	Date	Version	Format	Label	Ref
Various	May 24, 2023	Regular	Digital download; streaming	Avex Trax	
Japan	May 24, 2023	Regular	CD	Avex Trax	
Japan	May 24, 2023	Limited Edition A	CD	Avex Trax	
Japan	May 24, 2023	Limited Edition B	CD	Avex Trax	
Japan	May 24, 2023	Limited Edition C	CD	Avex Trax	
Japan	May 24, 2023	E.L.F.-Japan Official Shop	CD	Avex Trax	
South Korea	May 24, 2023	Regular	Digital download; streaming	SM; Kakao	
