= Here I Am (Yesung song) =

Single by Yesung

from the EP Here I Am
- Language: Korean
- Released: April 19, 2016
- Recorded: 2016
- Studio: Doobdoob (Seoul); InGrid (Seoul); Seoul
- Genre: K-ballad
- Length: 4:28
- Label: SM; Label SJ; KT
- Composers: Yesung; Brother Su
- Lyricists: Yesung; Brother Su
- Producers: Yesung; Eco Bridge

Yesung singles chronology
"Blind" (2014)	"Here I Am" (2016)	"A Melody for You" (2016)

Music video
- "Here I Am" on YouTube

"Here I Am" (Korean: 문 열어봐; RR: Mun yeoreobwa; lit. 'Open the door') is a song recorded by South Korean singer-songwriter Yesung. It was released on April 19, 2016, by SM Entertainment and Label SJ and distributed by KT Music. The song serves as the lead single for his debut EP, Here I Am and marking Yesung's debut song as a soloist.

== Background ==
Prior to officially debuting as a soloist, Yesung has been a member of the boy band Super Junior since its debut in 2005. He released "It Has to be You" on March 31, 2010, as one of the soundtracks of the television drama, Cinderella's Sister. The song surpassed 1,800,000 million in downloads according to the Gaon Chart. During Super Junior's Super Show 5 concert in Seoul in March 2013, Yesung announced he would enlist in the military that year, but the exact date was yet to be announced. He quietly entered the military on May 6, receiving four weeks of training before serving as a civil servant for 23 months.

In February 2014, Yesung released the single "Blind" as one of the singles of SM the Ballad's EP, SM the Ballad Vol. 2 - Breath. He was discharged from the military service on May 4, 2015. Shortly after his discharge, Yesung reunited with subgroup Super Junior-K.R.Y with a Japanese tour that started in Yokohama on June 2 to 3 and had 11 total performances in arenas in Kobe, Fukuoka, and Nagoya. Yesung resumed Super Junior group activities with the release of their eighth studio album, Devil which was released in July. At Devil press conference on July 15, Yesung revealed that he has a vocal cord nodule which he argued for being too happy and overpracticed. On August 22, Yesung announced he had undergone a vocal nodule procedure.

On April 12, 2016, SM announced that Yesung would debut as a soloist with the release of the EP Here I Am on April 19. A day later, it was reported that Yesung had collaborated with songwriter Brother Su, for "Here I Am" which is described as a K-ballad song. The following day, News1 reported that Yesung would perform "Here I Am" for the first time at M Countdown on April 21, Music Bank on April 22, and Show! Music Core on April 23.

The song was released alongside the EP on April 19.

== Composition ==
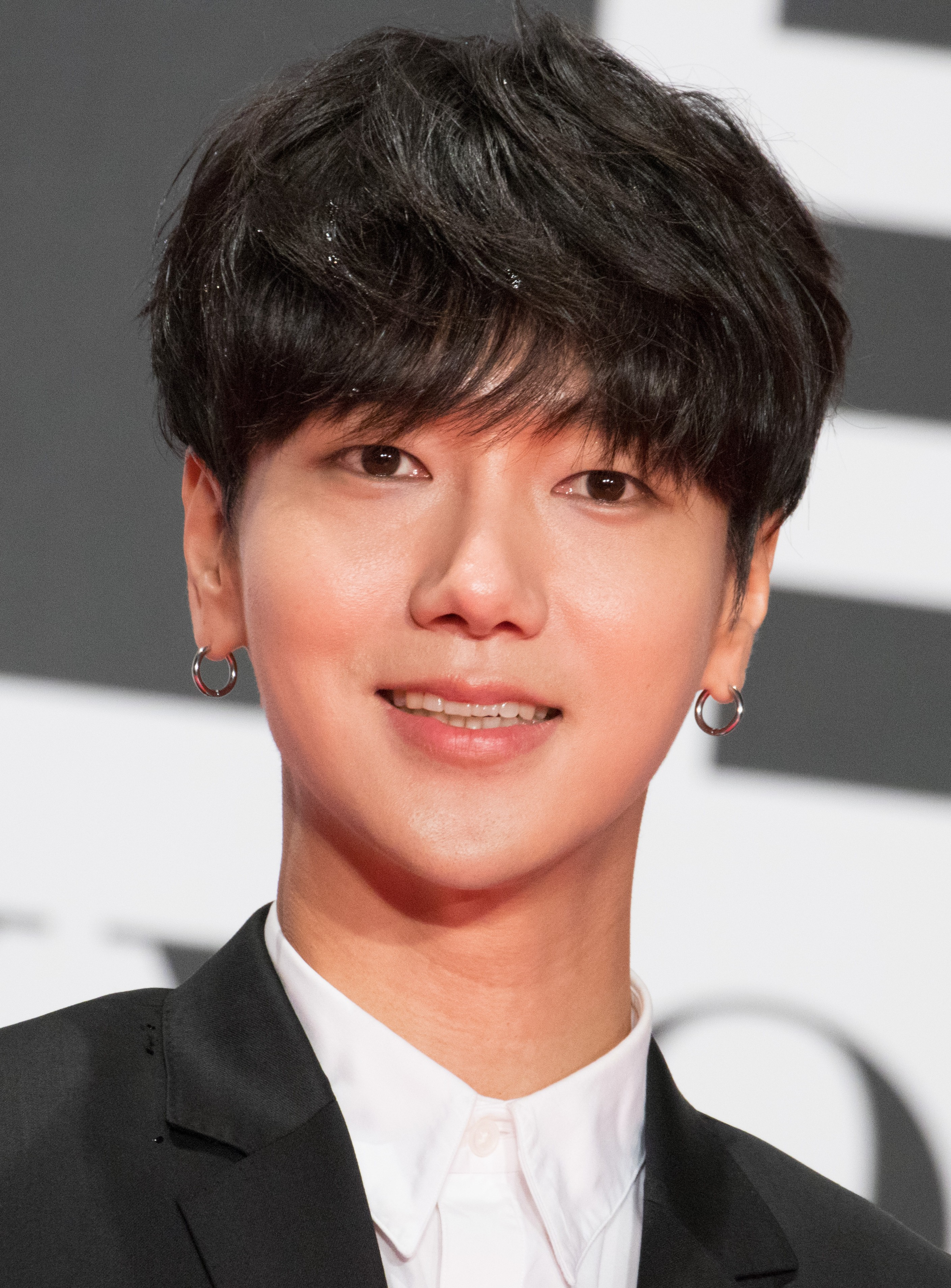
Yesung (pictured in 2016) is credited as the co-lyricist and the co-composer of "Here I Am"

"Here I Am" is a K-ballad song penned and composed by both Yesung and Brother Su. The lyrics depict a man's heart after a breakup with his girlfriend a longing heart for his lover who broke up after a breakup. The song was composed and then arranged by Eco Bridge in the key of C# major with 138 beats per minute.

== Music video ==
The music video for "Here I Am" was released on April 19. It was directed and produced by video production company 37thDegree, reflecting the feelings that Yesung felt when writing the song and his opinions on the image that came to mind. It stars Yesung and actress Park Hye-su. The video utilized a slow-motion effect by shooting at 30 frames at high speed to capture the emotions of the characters.

== Live performance ==
Yesung performed "Here I Am" four days in a row in music show appearances, starting with an appearance at M Countdown on April 21. The song was performed the next day at Music Bank. On April 23, the song was performed at Show! Music Core. Yesung performed the song on April 24 during his appearance at Inkigayo.

"Here I Am" was included as part of Yesung's first solo concert titled "Sweet Coffee", part of SM Entertainment concert series The AGIT, held from June 3 to June 19. It was then featured on the setlist of Yesung's second South Korean concert, Yesung Solo Concert "Spring" in 2017.

The refrain of the song was performed on Yesung's Unfading Sense concert tour in 2023.

== Charts ==
Chart (2016)	Peak position
South Korea (Gaon)	43

== Credits ==
Credits adapted from EP's liner notes.

Studio

- Doobdoob Studio – recording, digital audio editing
- Seoul Studio – recording
- SM Big Shot Studio – digital audio editing
- SM Concert Hall Studio – mixing
- Sterling Sound – mastering

Personnel

- SM Entertainment – executive supervisor
- Label SJ – executive producer
- Yesung – producer, vocals, composition, lyrics
- Tak Young-jun – producer
- Eco Bridge – producer, arrangement, piano, strings
- Brother Su – lyrics, composition
- Kenzie – vocal direction
- Corps – vocal direction
- Kang Tae-woo – background vocals
- Shin Seok-cheol – drums
- Jo Cheon-yeong – strings
- Jeong Eun-kyung – recording
- Kim Cheon-geun – recording
- Lee Ji-hoon – recording
- Jeong Woo-young – recording
- Jeong Gi-hoon – recording
- Park Moo-il – recording
- Ji Yong-ju – recording
- Lee Min-gyu – digital audio editing
- Seo Mi-rae – digital audio editing
- Jin Nam-gung – mixing
- Tom Coyne – mastering

== Release history ==
Release history for "Here I Am"
Region	Date	Format	Label
South Korea	April 19, 2016	Digital download; streaming	SM; Label SJ; KT
Various	April 19, 2016	Digital download; streaming	SM; Label SJ
