= Pink Magic =

- Digital and "Pink" cover

EP by Yesung
- Released: June 18, 2019
- Recorded: 2019
- Studio: CSMUSIC (Seoul); Doobdoob (Seoul); Golden Bell Tree Sound (Seoul); JM (Seoul); Seoul; SM Blue Ocean (Seoul); SM LVYIN (Seoul); W (Seoul)
- Genre: K-pop; pop rock; R&B
- Length: 22:26
- Language: Korean
- Label: SM; Label SJ; Dreamus
- Producer: Tak Young-jun; Jake K; Nico Stadi; 1601; Zigzag Note; Choi Sung-il; Lohi; Shin Jeong-eun

Yesung chronology
Story (2019)	Pink Magic (2019)	Beautiful Night (2021)

Singles from Pink Magic
- 1. "Pink Magic" Released: June 18, 2019

Music video
- "Pink Magic" on YouTube

Pink Magic is the third Korean extended play by South Korean singer Yesung. It was released on June 18, 2019, by SM Entertainment, and Label SJ. The EP featured six tracks in total, including the lead single of the same name.

== Background ==
On May 30, 2019, Yesung announced that he would have a Korean comeback in June, marking his first Korean comeback in two years following the release of Spring Falling. He was originally scheduled for a comeback in March but it coincides with Super Junior's third world tour, delaying the comeback for another three months.

On June 12, Yesung tweeted the tracklist of the album, which includes "Eat's OK" and "Wish" — the two tracks written by himself.

On June 17, the highlight medley of the album was uploaded on YouTube.

On June 18, the lead single, "Pink Magic" along with its music video, was released on the same day alongside the EP. The music video featured bandmates Donghae, and Kyuhyun.

== Composition ==
The EP contains a variety of genres. Speaking of its variety presented, Yesung stated "The mini-album is full of songs that I like. I want to create music with a variety of genres that everyone can like."

The EP begins with title track "Pink Magic", a rhythmic pop song with a bouncy signature synth sound with an upbeat guitar sound. "Every Day, Wait for Us" is a traditional K-ballad song that conveys anger and sadness of waiting to meet someone again. The third song, "Parallel Lines" is a pop-rock song with Britpop influence that expresses an unapproachable love in parallel lines. "I'll Remember" is described as a song that expressed delicate emotional line between happiness and sadness.

Yesung is involved in writing and composing two songs, "Eat's OK" and "Wish." "Eat's OK" is a song addressed to the fans with witty lyrics and warm guitar sounds. "Wish" is a ballad song with fairytale-like story with a piano melody accompanying it.

== Promotion ==
Yesung promoted the EP by performing "Pink Magic" live in Inkigayo on July 7.

== Track listing ==
Pink Magic track listing
No.	Title	Lyrics	Music	Arrangement	Length
1.	"Pink Magic"	Choi Hee-jeong; Min Yeon-jae; January 8	Jake K; Nico Stadi; Teemu Brunila; Hailey Leane Collier; Ryan S. Jhun	Jake K; Nico Stadi; Teemu Brunila; Hailey Leane Collier; Ryan S. Jhun	3:14
2.	"Eat's OK" (굶지 말기; Gumji malgi; 'Don't starve')	Min Yeon-jae; Yesung	Phenomenotes; Yesung	Jeong Soo-wan; Shin Seung-ik	3:27
3.	"Every Day, Wait for Us" (그냥 오면 돼; Geunyang omyeon dwae; 'Just come')	Kim Ho-gyeong	1601	1601	3:50
4.	"Parallel Lines" (평행선; Pyeonghaengseon)	ZigZag Note; Kang Myung-sin	ZigZag Note	ZigZag Note	4:03
5.	"I'll Remember" (외워둘게; Oewodulge; 'I'll remember it')	Choi Sung-il; Min Yeon-jae	Lohi; Choi Sung-il	Lohi; Choi Sung-il	3:43
6.	"Wish" (우연을 모아; Uyeoneul moa; 'Collect coincidence')	Min Yeon-jae; Yesung	Phenomenotes; Yesung	Shin Jeong-eun	4:06
Total length:					22:26

== Charts ==
Chart performance for Pink Magic
Chart (2019)	Peak position
South Korean Albums (Gaon)	4
Japan (Oricon)	41

== Release history ==
Release history for Pink Magic
Region	Date	Format	Label
South Korea	June 18, 2019	CD	SM; Label SJ; Dreamus
Various	June 18, 2019	Digital download; streaming	SM; Label SJ

== See also ==
- Yesung discography
