= It's Complicated (EP) =

- Digital cover

EP by Yesung
- Released: November 5, 2024
- Recorded: 2024
- Studios: Gaenari (Seoul); SM Aube (Seoul); SM Dorii (Seoul); SM Droplet (Seoul); SM LVYIN (Seoul); Sound Pool (Seoul)
- Genre: K-pop
- Length: 15:49
- Language: Korean
- Labels: SM; Kakao
- Producers: PhD; Cutfather; Jurek; Tido; Ben Foster; Steve Manovski; Eldon; Jaedogi; Wuk

Yesung chronology
Unfading Sense (2023)	It's Complicated (2024)	Sakihokoru Toki O Matsu No Wa (2026)

Singles from It's Complicated
- 1. "It's Complicated" Released: November 5, 2024

It's Complicated is the sixth EP by South Korean singer-songwriter Yesung. It was released on November 5, 2024, by SM Entertainment and distributed by Kakao Entertainment.

The release is Yesung's first comeback since Unfading Sense in October 2023. Consisting of five tracks and lasting near 16 minutes, the EP is Yesung's shortest release.

== Background ==
Yesung wrapped up 2023 with his third comeback through the release of Unfading Sense on October 4. He then embarked on his first solo Asia tour with the same name of the EP from October 2023 until January 2024. On December 20, he released Not Nightmare Christmas, a Japanese single album.

Yesung regrouped with Super Junior as part of the SM Town Live 2024 SMC U Palace held in Tokyo Dome held on February 21 and 22.

On October 18, SM announced that Yesung would have a comeback the next month with the EP, It's Complicated. The announcement also added that the EP consists of five tracks with the lead single of the same name. The EP pre-orders also began on the same day at various offline and online record stores.

The comeback promotion plan was released on October 22, hinting at several image teasers, highlight clips, and concerts on January 18 and 19, 2025. The announcement on October 24, revealed that the lead single "It's Complicated" was described as a "Euphoric" pop song.

The EP was released on November 5, both digitally and physically alongside the music video for the lead single.

== Composition ==
The EP begins with its titular track, a "euphoric" pop song with bass line and electronic sound performed with Yesung's powerful vocals. The lyrics were penned by J14, describing the unfamiliarity of new emotions.

The second track, "There She Goes Again" is an "easy-listening" pop song that harmonizes ryhthmic guitar riffs with a simple track. The lyrics were penned by Kelbyul, telling the story of unfulfilled love.

"Easy" was described as a medium-tempo pop song with groovy bass line and bright guitar sounds. The lyrics were penned by Yiyijin, narrating how it is never easy to move on from breakup even after multiple times.

"Beautiful Paradox" is a pop song delivered with the energy of rock band, co-composed by Steve Manowski and Jordan Shaw. Penned by Jeon Ji-eun, the lyrics explore the contradictory nature of love and finding it in the most unexpected cases.

The EP concludes with "Curtain", a dream pop song that turns into hard rock, co-composed by Eldon, Jaedogi, and Wuk. The lyrics were penned by the trio, expressing gratitude to the fans by calling them over behind the curtain after the show is over.

== Promotions ==
On December 6, SM announced the schedule of Yesung's solo concert tour and uploading live video of "Curtain" with labelmate Wonbin of Riize on the guitar and special video of "There She Goes Again".

From January 18, 2025, to April 12, Yesung embraked on a solo Asia tour of the same name to promote the EP, visiting Seoul, Bangkok, Hong Kong, Macau, Taipei, Tokyo, and Kuala Lumpur. The tour began with a sold-out crowd in Seoul which was also livestreamed on Beyond Live platform.

On February 25, SM announced that Yesung will hold an encore concert called "We're the Complicated Kind" in Seoul on April 19 and 20. The encore concert was held in Yonsei University's auditorium and also broadcast to various parts of the world on Beyond Live. During the concert, Yesung hinted at a Super Junior comeback later in the year.

== Track listing ==
It's Complicated track listing
No.	Title	Lyrics	Music	Arrangement	Length
1.	"It's Complicated"	J14	Daniel Davidsen; Peter Wallevik; Cutfather; Plested; Max Ulver; Lasse Lindorff	PhD; Cutfather	3:39
2.	"There She Goes Again"	Kelbyul (153/Joombas)	Jurek; Tido; Drew Love; Micah Premnath	Jurek; Tido	3:27
3.	"Easy"	Yiyijin	Dalton Mauldin; Ben Foster	Ben Foster	2:40
4.	"Beautiful Paradox"	Jeon Ji-eun	Steve Manovski; Jordan Shaw	Steve Manowski	3:02
5.	"Curtain"	Eldon; Jaedogi; Wuk	Eldon; Jaedogi; Wuk	Eldon; Jaedogi; Wuk	2:58
Total length:					15:49

== Charts ==
Chart performance for It's Complicated
Chart (2024)	Peak position
South Korean Albums (Circle)	10

== Credits and personnel ==
Credits adapted from the EP's liner notes.

Studio

- SM Yellow Tail Studio – recording (track 1) digital editing (track 1), engineered for mix (track 1)
- SM Dorii Studio – recording (track 1, 2)
- SoundPOOL Studios – recording (track 1-3)
- SM LVYIN Studio – recording (track 2, 5), digital editing (track 2, 5), engineered for mix (track 2, 5), mixing (track 5)
- SM Big Shot Studio – digital editing, engineered for mix, mixing (track 3)
- SM Aube Studio – recording (track 4)
- SM Droplet Studio – recording (track 3)
- SM Concert Hall Studio – mixing (track 1)
- SM Blue Ocean Studio – mixing (track 2)
- SM Blue Cup Studio (track 4)
- 821 Sound Mastering – mastering

Personnel

- SM Entertainment – executive producer
- Yesung – vocals, artist director
- PhD – producer, arrangement, programming (track 1)
  - Peter Wallevik – composition, arrangement, piano
  - Daniel Davidsen – composition, arrangement, guitar
- Cutfather – producer, composition, arrangement (track 1)
- Plested – composition (track 1)
- Max Ulver – composition (track 1)
- Lasse Lindorff – composition (track 1)
- Daniel Heloy – guitar (track 1)
- Mich Hansen – percussion (track 1)
- Emily Yeonseo Kim – vocal direction (track 1)
- Jeon Sung-woo – vocal direction (track 1, 3-5), background vocals (track 1, 2-5)
- Jurek Reunamäki – producer, composition, arrangement (track 2)
- Tido Nguyen – producer, composition, arrangement (track 2)
- Andrew Neely aka Drew Love – composition (track 2)
- Micah Premnath – composition (track 2)
- Kelbyul (153/Joombas) – lyrics (track 2)
- Ben Foster – producer, composition, arrangement (track 3)
- Dalton Mauldin – composition (track 3)
- Yiyijin – lyrics (track 3)
- Steve Manowski – producer, composition (track 4)
- Jordan Shaw – composition (track 4)
- Jeon Ji-eun – lyrics (track 4)
- Jaedogi – producer, composition, arrangement, background vocals, drums, piano, synthesizer (track 5)
- Wuk – producer, composition, arrangement, drums, guitar, piano (track 5)
- Eldon – producer, composition, arrangement (track 5)
- Noh Min-ji – digital editing (track 1), engineered for mix (track 1)
- Jeong Jae-woon – recording (track 1) (track 2)
- Nam Koong-jin – mixing (track 1)
- Lee Ji-hong – recording (track 2, 4, 5), digital editing (track 2, 4, 5), engineered for mix (track 2, 4, 5), mixing (track 5)
- Lee Min-gyu – digital editing, engineered for mix, mixing (track 3)
- Kim Joo-hyun – recording (track 3)
- Jung Eui-seok – recording (track 4)
- Kim Cheol-seon – mixing (track 2)
- Kwon Nam-woo – mastering (all tracks)

== Release history ==
Release history for It's Complicated
Region	Date	Format	Label
South Korea	November 5, 2024	CD; LP; SMini	SM; Kakao
Various	November 5, 2024	Digital download; streaming	SM
