= Beautiful Night (Yesung song) =

- The logo as shown on the music video.

Single by Yesung

from the EP Beautiful Night
- Language: Korean
- Released: May 3, 2021
- Recorded: 2021
- Studio: Doobdoob (Seoul); Seoul; SM Big Shot (Seoul); SM Yellow Tail (Seoul)
- Genre: City pop
- Length: 3:39
- Label: SM; Label SJ; Dreamus
- Composers: Nokdu; Jake K; St Nox
- Lyricist: Nokdu
- Producers: Jake K; St Nox

Yesung singles chronology
"Phantom Pain" (2021)	"Beautiful Night" (2021)	"After Love" (2022)

Music video
- "Beautiful Night" on YouTube

"Beautiful Night" is a song recorded by South Korean singer-songwriter Yesung as the lead single from his fourth EP of the same name. Serving as the first track on the EP, it was released on May 3, 2021, by SM Entertainment and Label SJ, and distributed by Dreamus.

== Background ==
On June 18, 2019, Yesung released his third EP, Pink Magic with the lead single of the same name which charted 102nd on Gaon Download Chart. In October, Yesung returned to Super Junior for their tenth Korean studio album, Time Slip and went on their fifth Asia-wide tour until February 2020 to promote their album.

On May 1, 2020, Yesung released digital single "Still Standing" with singer Suran for SM Station Season 4 as his only solo release that year. He co-wrote pre-release single, "The Melody" with bandmate Leeteuk, that was released in November 6, coinciding with the band's 15th anniversary. The song would go on to be featured in their 11th studio album which was released in March the following year.

On April 23, 2021, Yesung released pre-release single "Phantom Pain" with an announcement that he would have a comeback on May 3. Beautiful Night was announced as the name for the EP on April 26 and the titular track was announced the following day. On April 30, a teaser video for the music video confirmed that actress Park Gyu-young would be featured in the music video for "Beautiful Night".

On May 3, the music video for lead single "Beautiful Night" was released on 6 PM KST alongside the EP.

== Composition ==
"Beautiful Night" was co-composed by Nokdu, Jake K, and St Nox, and introduced as a city pop song with a dynamic and rhythmic brass arrangements and nostalgic sounds in the second half of the song. The latter two arranged the song in the key of F# minor with the tempo of 100 beats per minute.

The lyrics were penned by Nokdu as it expresses the excitement of meeting a loved one under a beautiful night.

In an interview with iMBC, Yesung chose this song as a title track because he liked the theme of the song and added that city pop is perfect for transition from spring to summer. He also added that he grew up listening to Kim Hyun-chul when he was a child.

== Music video ==
The music video for "Beautiful Night" shows Yesung and Park Gyu-young spending an evening together.

== Live performances ==
There were no offline promotional appearances at music shows for the song. Yesung uploaded the live video version of the song on May 6 and another version on May 14. He performed the song in his online concert, Yesung Special Event: "I'll Light Your Way" on July 25, as the last song of the setlist.

The song would be included in Yesung's 2025 tour "It's Complicated" alongside other hits.

== Charts ==
Chart (2021)	Peak position
South Korea Downloads (Gaon)	26

== Credits ==
Credits adapted from EP's liner notes.

Studio

- SM Big Shot Studio – recording, digital audio editing, engineered for mix
- Doobdoob Studio – recording
- Seoul Studio – recording
- SM Yellow Tail Studio – recording
- SM Concert Hall Studio – mixing
- 821 Sound Mastering – mastering

Personnel

- SM Entertainment – executive supervisor
- Label SJ – executive producer
- Lee Soo-man – producer
- Jake K – producer, composition, arrangement, bass, piano, strings, synthesizer
- St Nox – producer, composition, arrangement
- Nokdu – lyricist, background vocals
- Yesung – vocals
- Kwon Nam-woo – mastering

== Release history ==
Release history for "Beautiful Night"
Region	Date	Format	Label
South Korea	May 3, 2021	Digital download; streaming	SM; Label SJ; Dreamus
Various	May 3, 2021	Digital download; streaming	SM; Label SJ
