= Story (Yesung album) =

2019 Japanese studio album by Yesung

- Digital and CD+DVD cover

Studio album by Yesung
- Released: February 13, 2019
- Recorded: 2018–19
- Studio: 821 (Seoul); Doobdoob (Seoul); In Grid (Seoul); Koko Sound (Seoul); Seoul; SM Concert Hall (Seoul); W Sound (Seoul); Victor (Tokyo)
- Genre: J-pop
- Length: 41:56
- Language: Japanese
- Label: Avex Trax; SM Japan
- Producer: Nam So-young; Shinji Hayashi

Yesung chronology
| Spring Falling (2017) | Story (2019) | Pink Magic (2019) |

Singles from Story
- 1. "Ame Nochi Hare no Sora no Iro" Released: October 19, 2016; 2. "Splash / Aishiteru Tte Ienai" Released: June 28, 2017; 3. "Because I Love You" Released: February 9, 2019

Music video
- "Splash" on YouTube "Because I Love Yo" on YouTube

Story is the debut Japanese studio album by South Korean singer Yesung, it was released on February 13, 2019, under Avex Trax. The album contains 11 tracks — three previously released songs and eight new material.

== Background ==
The pre-distribution of the album commenced on February 6, where it won first place in the iTunes K-pop ranking in Japan and other 10 countries and regions around the world.

A week later, Yesung's management agency confirmed the singer would have a Japanese comeback through a full-length album on February 20 marking his Japanese comeback since the release of "Splash" in 2017. The album is supported by the release of "Because I Love You" as its lead track on February 9. The music video for the song was recorded in Prague, Czech Republic. On that same day, Yesung released the music video for "If You" as a Valentine's Day gift for the fans.

== Composition ==
Yesung participated in the production of several songs and the album featured an appearance by bandmates Donghae and Eunhyuk through their sub-unit Super Junior-D&E for the "For Dream" track.

== Promotion ==
On November 11, 2018, three months before the album's release, SM Entertainment Japan announced Yesung would embark on a nationwide tour across Japan in a series of concerts called SUPER JUNIOR-YESUNG Special Live "Y’s STORY". The concert became Yesung's third solo Japanese tour. Shortly after the album's release Yesung promoted Story from February 20 until March 14.

=== Concert dates ===
| Date | City | Country | Venue |
|---|---|---|---|
| February 20, 2019 | Fukuoka | Japan | Zepp Fukuoka |
| February 27, 2019 | Osaka | Japan | Zepp Osaka Bayside |
| February 28, 2019 | Osaka | Japan | Zepp Osaka Bayside |
| March 6, 2019 | Nagoya | Japan | Zepp Nagoya |
| March 7, 2019 | Nagoya | Japan | Zepp Nagoya |
| March 13, 2019 | Tokyo | Japan | Toyosu PIT |
| March 14, 2019 | Tokyo | Japan | Toyosu PIT |

== Track listing ==
Story track listing
| No. | Title | Lyrics | Music | Arrangement | Length |
|---|---|---|---|---|---|
| 1. | "My Story" (Maybe it's my story (もしかしたら僕の物語, Moshika shitara boku no monogatari)) | Hasegawa; Hye-Jun Zo; Yesung | Mad Fresh; OneStar | Mad Fresh; OneStar | 3:45 |
| 2. | "Because I Love You" (Important bond (大切な絆, Taisetsu na kizuna)) | Hideo Toyosaki; Yesung | Phenomenotes | Phenomenotes | 3:30 |
| 3. | "If You" (I'm going to the meeting now (いま会いにゆきます, Ima ai ni yukimasu)) | Ume; Yeon Jae-min; Yesung | Phenomenotes | Phenomenotes | 3:21 |
| 4. | "For Dream" (Aiming for a dream (夢を目指して, Yume o mezashite) featuring Super Junior-D&E) | Hidenori Tanaka; Yeon Jae-min; Yesung | Andrew Choi; Erik Lidbom | Andrew Choi; Erik Lidbom | 3:27 |
| 5. | "I Cannot Say I Love You" (I can't say I love you (愛してるって言えない, Aishiteru tte ienai)) | Ryu Murakami | Choi Hee-jun; Hwang Seung-chan | Choi Hee-jun; Hwang Seung-chan | 3:35 |
| 6. | "On that Day, I'll Love You" (On days like that – I'll love even the pain (そんな日は ～その痛みさえ愛するよ～, Sonna hi wa ~ sono itami sae aisuru yo)) | Natsumi Kobayashi; Yesung | Phenomenotes | Phenomenotes | 4:09 |
| 7. | "Splash" | Hidenori Tanaka | CuzD; Donna; Ricky | | 3:08 |
| 8. | "Dyeing Matsudan ~ First Love" (It’s dyed ~First love~ (染まったんだ ～初恋～, Somatta nda ~ hatsukoi)) | Ume; Yeon Jae-min; Yesung | Phenomenotes | Phenomenotes | 3:47 |
| 9. | "Let Me Kiss" | Hidenori Tanaka | Andreas Öberg; Jany Schella; Octobar | Andreas Öberg; Jany Schella; Octobar | 4:58 |
| 10. | "Sky Color of Rain" (The color of the sunny sky after the rain (雨のち晴れの空の色, Ame nochi hare no sora no iro)) | Hajime Watanabe; Yesung | Choi Hee-jun; Hwang Seung-chan | Choi Hee-jun; Hwang Seung-chan | 4:56 |
| 11. | "Happiness" (Happiness is always nearby (幸せなことはいつもそばにある, Shiawase na koto wa itsumo soba ni aru)) | Hidenori Tanaka; Yeon Jae-min; Yesung | Andreas Öberg; Chris Wahle | Andreas Öberg; Chris Wahle | 3:20 |
| Total length: | | | | | 41:56 |

== Charts ==
Weekly chart performance for Story
| Chart (2019) | Peak position |
|---|---|
| Oricon Albums Chart (Oricon) | 7 |

== Release history ==
Release history for Story
| Region | Date | Format | Label |
|---|---|---|---|
| Japan | February 13, 2019 | CD; DVD; Blu-ray | Avex Trax |
| Various | February 13, 2019 | Digital download; streaming | Avex Trax |

== See also ==
- Yesung discography
