= Whatcha Doin' (song) =

Single by Yesung featuring Chung Ha
- Language: Korean
- Released: December 17, 2018
- Recorded: 2018
- Genre: Synth-pop; R&B
- Length: 3:29
- Label: SM; Label SJ; iRiver
- Composers: MZMC; Jack Wilson; Jordin Post; Luke Shipstad; Andrew Choi; Ginette Claudette; Yesung
- Lyricists: Min Yeon-jae; Yesung
- Producer: Kuuro

Yesung singles chronology
"Splash" (2017)	"Whatcha Doin'" (2018)	"Carpet" (2019)

Chung Ha singles chronology
"Wow Thing" (2018)	"Whatcha Doin'" (2018)	"Gotta Go" (2019)

Music video
- "Whatcha Doin'" on YouTube

"Whatcha Doin'" (Korean: 지금 어디야?; RR: Jigeum eodiya?; lit. '"Where are you now?"') is a song recorded by South Korean singer-songwriter Yesung featuring Chung Ha. It was released as a digital single on December 17, 2018, by SM Entertainment and Label SJ, and distributed by iRiver.

== Background ==
Throughout 2018, Yesung actively took part in Super Junior's Super Show 7 world tour and participated in the group's first EP One More Time, which was released in October. As a soloist, he released "On My Own", one of the soundtracks of Should We Kiss First? in April.

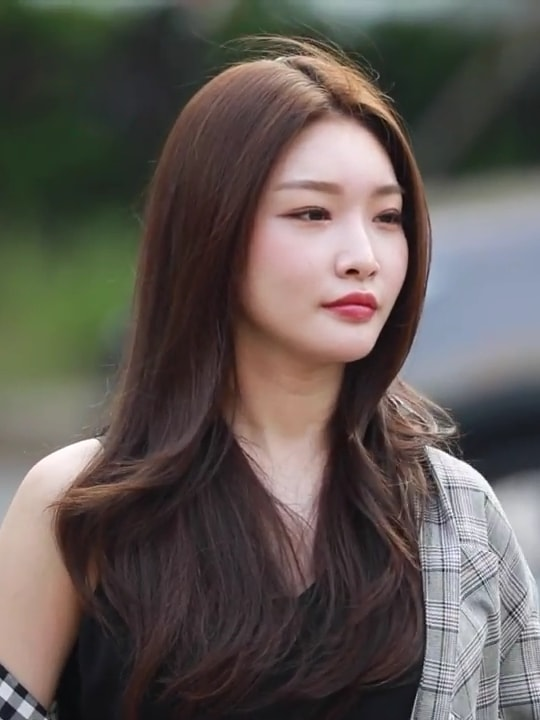
Chung Ha in August 2018

Chung Ha released her second EP Offset in January. She then released her third EP, Blooming Blue, fronted by lead single "Love U" in July. On August 8, she was announced to be part of the SM Station X 0 collaborative project with Seulgi, SinB, and Soyeon for an SM Station X 0. Their single "Wow Thing" was released on September 28.

On December 12, Label SJ announced that Yesung and Chung Ha has teamed up for the single "Whatcha Doin'" which was planned to be released on December 17. The teaser images and the music video preview were uploaded on the same day. The teaser music video was uploaded on the SM Town channels two days later.

The single was released on the noon of December 17 alongside its music video.

== Composition ==
Composed by MZMC, Jack Wilson, Jordin Post, Luke Shipstad, Andrew Choi, Ginette Claudette, and Yesung, "Whatcha Doin'" was introduced an up-tempo pop song with groovy bass line and synth pad. CNN Indonesia described the song as sweet pop song with a touch of R&B, and a chorus that is easy to sing-along.

The lyrics were co-written by Yesung and Min Yeon-jae, expressing the feelings of being torn by someone who cannot be contacted.

The song was arranged by Kuuro in the key of D major with the tempo of 99 beats per minute.

== Music video ==
The "sweet" music video featured turquoise, pale pink, and green colors to create an adorable impression. Chung Ha appears with oversized clothes as she waits a phone call from Yesung.

== Chart ==
Chart performance for "Whatcha Doin'"
Chart (2018)	Peak position
South Korea BGM (Gaon)	64

== Credits ==
Credits adapted from Melon.

Personnel

- SM Entertainment – executive supervisor
- Label SJ – executive producer
- Kuuro – producer, arrangement
  - Jordin Post – composition
  - Luke Shipstad – composition
- Yesung – vocals, lyrics, composition
- MZMC – composition
- Jack Wilson – composition
- Andrew Choi – composition
- Ginette Claudette – composition
- Min Yeon-jae – lyrics
- Kim Chung-ha – vocals

== Release history ==
Release history for "Whatcha Doin'"
Region	Date	Format	Label
South Korea	December 17, 2018	Digital download; streaming	SM; Label SJ; iRiver
Various	December 17, 2018	Digital download; streaming	SM; Label SJ
