= Tak Young-jun =

South Korean business executive

- Born: January 17, 1978 (age 48)
- Education: Dongguk University
- Years active: 2001–present
- Title: COO of SM Entertainment; Co-CEO of SM Entertainment; CEO of SM Life Design Group; Representative director of SM Entertainment Japan
- Father: Tak In-soo

Korean name
- Hangul: 탁영준
- RR: Tak Yeongjun
- MR: T'ak Yŏngjun

Tak Young-jun (Korean: 탁영준; also spelled Tak Young-joon; born January 17, 1978) is a South Korean business executive and the current COO and co-CEO of SM Entertainment. He is the CEO of SM Life Design Group and a representative director of SM Entertainment Japan. Tak began working for SM in 2001 and was previously employed as the head of the singer management office, management office, and performance directing team. He was formerly a manager of Shinhwa and Super Junior, and is currently the director of Riize.

== Life and career ==
Born in January 17, 1978, Tak Young-jun was a 1997 graduate of Dongguk University's Department of Political Science and Diplomacy and joined SM Entertainment in 2001 after being discharged from the military. He revealed that although his company employment has nothing to do with his major, entertainment was a field that kept drawing his attention. Tak worried about whether to live as a regular office worker or follow the path he wanted to go as he revealed that it was a field where he could work "more passionately and live a life that's not a waste." The local music industry was reportedly at its "peak" when he joined the company. It was when Shinhwa and G.o.d took over the prime spot of H.O.T. and Sechs Kies, and BoA first entered Japan.

After joining SM, Tak commenced learning work as a manager of Shinhwa. Tak was also an exclusive manager of Super Junior and was in charge of their management even before their debut. Six managers worked with Exo from three teams under Tak, the head of the singer management office at SM's management headquarters. He watched the artist carry on with their schedules and took care of various issues, such as the schedule to be accomplished afterward. Tak was also the head of SM's management office and performance directing team, and participated in the debut albums of Shinee, f(x), and Exo and managed Girls' Generation after "Genie" (2009) [promotions]. Tak was the first to introduce a multi-member group unit system, introducing Super Junior's sub-units Super Junior-K.R.Y., a ballad group, and Super Junior-T, a trot group.

With Label SJ previously entering its second year of establishment, the address of the headquarters and the management have not been accurately revealed. Tak, manager-in-charge of Super Junior from debut to their sixth Korean studio album Sexy, Free & Single [promotions], has been producing the group's albums, along with Yesung's first extended play (EP), Here I Am. On March 10, 2020, SM announced through a board meeting that Tak, as the chief marketing officer (CMO), (Note: Despite being labeled as CMO in most news articles, Tak Young-jun is considered and called the chief operating officer (COO) of SM, as per its official 2021 SM Entertainment Sustainable Management Report.) along with Lee Sung-soo, as the chief executive officer (CEO), was appointed as co-CEOs of the company. On April 9, 2021, Tak was among the 13 committee members appointed in the culture and arts field by the Ministry of Foreign Affairs as part of the 5th advisory committee while also being part of 11 members assigned to the 6th advisory committee. On January 10, 2022, SM Life Design Group held a shareholders' meeting to appoint Tak as its new CEO from his former position of inside director, with former inside director and CEO Shin Sung-bok resigning from the company. On February 3, 2023, it was announced that Tak was appointed as the director for SM's upcoming boy group project, Riize.

Tak and co-CEO Lee became involved in a conflict over SM's management rights with founder Lee Soo-man in early 2023. They announced plans to restructure the company, cutting out Lee Soo-man to appease shareholders, who had revolted over his high producing fees. In retaliation, Lee Soo-man sold his shares in the company to Hybe Corporation, making them the largest shareholder. Tak and Lee attempted to secure SM's independence from Hybe by seeking help from technology company Kakao. Hybe dropped out of the takeover battle on March 12, relinquishing control of SM's management rights to Kakao. Tak stepped down from his position as co-CEO and from the board of directors on March 31. He remained in his position as COO and led the IP Committee following SM's reorganisation. In March 2024, Tak was reappointed co-CEO of SM Entertainment and returned to the board of directors.

== Interviews ==
- [Attention, This Person] Tak Young-jun, Head of SM Entertainment's Singer Management Office, Segye Ilbo, 2013
- [Interview] In the Age of K-pop 3.0, We Must Live by 'Economies of Scale', Hankook Ilbo, 2016

== Accolades ==
=== Awards and nominations ===
Name of the award ceremony, year presented, category, nominee(s) of the award, and the result of the nomination
Award ceremony	Year	Category	Nominee(s)	Result	Ref.
Korea Grand Music Awards	2024	Best Producer	Tak Young-jun	Won	

=== Listicles ===
Name of publisher, year listed, name of listicle, and placement
Publisher	Year	Listicle	Placement	Ref.
Billboard	2022	Indie Power Players	Placed	
Billboard	2022	International Power Players	Placed	
Billboard	2023	International Power Players	Placed	
