= Spring Falling =

- Spring and digital cover

EP by Yesung
- Released: April 18, 2017
- Recorded: 2017
- Studios: CSMUSIC (Seoul); Doobdoob (Seoul); In Grid (Seoul); Lead (Seoul); Nuplay (Seoul); Prelude (Seoul); Seoul; SM LVYIN (Seoul)
- Genres: K-ballad; folk; rock
- Length: 23:10
- Language: Korean
- Labels: SM; Label SJ; KT
- Producer: Tak Young-jun

Yesung chronology
Here I Am (2016)	Spring Falling (2017)	Story (2019)

Singles from Spring Falling
- 1. "Hibernation" Released: April 11, 2017; 2. "Paper Umbrella" Released: April 18, 2017

Spring Falling is the second extended play (EP) by South Korean singer, Yesung. It was released on April 18, 2017 by SM Entertainment and Label SJ, and distributed by KT Music.

== Background and release ==
On March 31, Label SJ stated, “Yesung is currently working on a solo album with the goal to release it in April. It is a full album and not part of SM Station.”.

On April 6, Label SJ revealed that Yesung will return with his second solo album “Spring Falling” on April 18.

Ahead of the album’s release, he will pre-release a music video for "Hibernation", a medium tempo ballad track with a soothing melody. Its lyrics contain the sweet message of not wanting to leave one’s lover’s side because it is warmer than a cozy spring day on April 11.

On April 13, Yesung revealed teasers, highlight medley and track list featuring Cho Kyu-hyun.

On April 18, the title track "Paper Umbrella" music video was released. The album Spring Falling topped iTunes album charts in five countries including Japan, Thailand, Singapore, Hong Kong, and Peru. Additionally, in Japan, Thailand, Singapore, Indonesia, Hong Kong, Peru, Mexico, and Hungary, the album took first place in the pop album chart, while in Japan, Thailand, Singapore, Indonesia, Hong Kong, Peru, Chile, and Mexico, it placed No. 1 in the K-pop album chart.

== Track listing ==
Official track list
No.	Title	Lyrics	Music	Arrangement	Length
1.	"Paper Umbrella" (봄날의 소나기; Bomnarui sonagi; 'Spring shower')	Seo Ji-eum	1601	1601	4:09
2.	"Hibernation" (겨울잠; Gyeouljam)	Denis Seo; 신승익	Denis Seo; 신승익	Denis Seo; 신승익	3:15
3.	"All But You" (그대뿐인지; Geudaeppuninji; 'Is it just you?')	윤송; 누플레이(NUPLAY)	윤송; 누플레이(NUPLAY)	윤송	4:01
4.	"Fly" (번지점프; Beonjijeompeu; 'Bungee jumping')	이유진	ZigZagNote	ZigZagNote	3:40
5.	"At the Time" (그때로; Geuttaero; 'Back then'; (featuring Kyuhyun))	Yesung; Realmee	Yesung; Realmee		4:03
6.	"So Close Yet So Far" (비눗방울; Binutbangul; 'Soap bubbles')	Yesung; 윤사라	Yesung; 최희준; 황승찬	강화성	4:02
Total length:					23:13

== Charts ==
Chart performance for Spring Falling
Chart (2017)	Peak position
South Korean Albums (Circle)	2
Japan (Oricon)	42

== Release history ==
Release history for Spring Falling
Region	Date	Format	Label
South Korea	April 18, 2017	CD	SM; Label SJ; KT Music
Various	April 18, 2017	Digital download; streaming	SM; Label SJ

== See also ==
- Yesung discography
