= Yesung =

South Korean singer-songwriter (born 1984)

- 예성
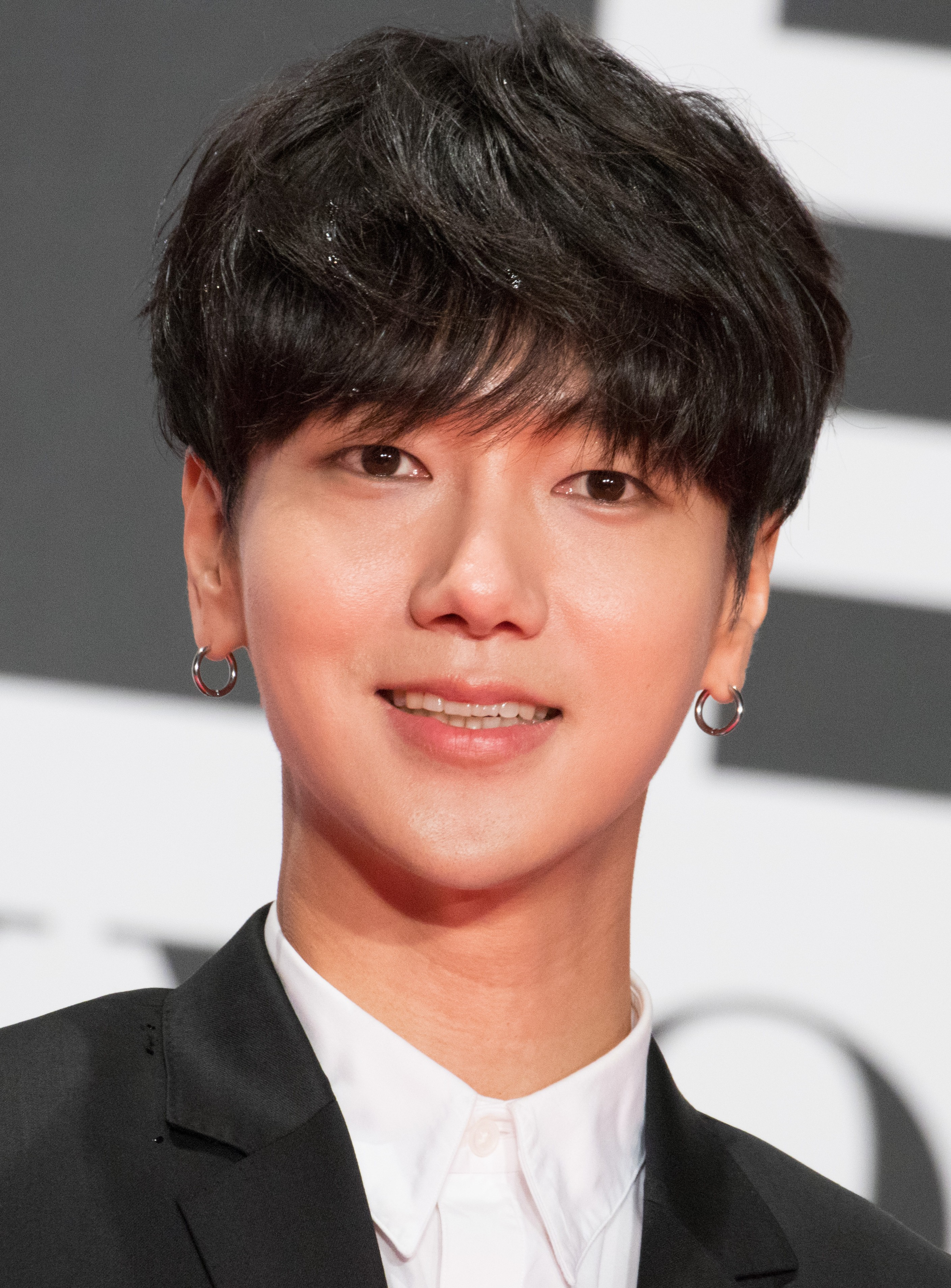
- Yesung at the opening ceremony of Tokyo International Film Festival 2016
- Born: Kim Jong-woon; August 24, 1984 (age 42); Seoul, South Korea
- Occupations: Singer; songwriter; actor; radio personality; MC
- Musical career
- Genres: K-pop; R&B; ballad; city pop; rock
- Instrument: Vocals
- Years active: 2005–present
- Labels: SM; Label SJ
- Member of: Super Junior; Super Junior-K.R.Y.; Super Junior-H; SM The Ballad; SM Town
- Website: Official website

Korean name
- Hangul: 김강훈
- Hanja: 金康熏
- RR: Gim Ganghun
- MR: Kim Kanghun

Stage name
- Hangul: 예성
- Hanja: 藝聲
- RR: Yeseong
- MR: Yesŏng

Former name
- Hangul: 김종운
- Hanja: 金鐘雲
- RR: Gim Jongun
- MR: Kim Chongun

YouTube information
- Channel: yessay_
- Subscribers: 156 thousand
- Views: 5.3 million
- Last updated: March 21, 2026

Signature
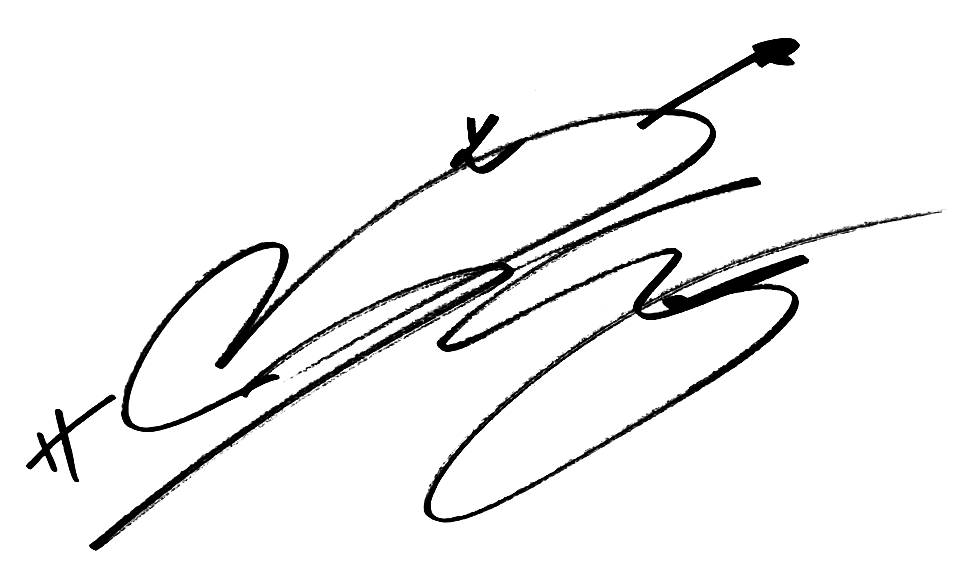

Kim Kang-hoon (born Kim Jong-woon; August 24, 1984), known professionally as Yesung, is a South Korean singer, songwriter, actor, radio personality, and television presenter. He debuted in 2005 as a member of Super Junior and its subgroups Super Junior-K.R.Y. (2006), Super Junior-H (2008) and participated in SM Entertainment's projects SM The Ballad (2014). Aside from group activities, he has recorded songs for various television dramas and movies, participated in various television dramas, movies, musicals and radio hosting.

He began his solo career in 2016 with his first extended play, Here I Am.

== Biography ==
Yesung was born Kim Jong-woon on August 24, 1984, as the older son of two; his younger brother's name is Kim Jong-jin. Yesung has since changed his name to Kim Kang-hoon. He was born in Seoul and later moved to Cheonan, South Chungcheong. From a young age, Yesung expressed an interest in singing. In 1999, he joined a broadcast singing competition and won gold at the Cheonan Singing Competition. In 2001, Yesung's mother, Im Bo-kyung, signed him up to audition for SM Entertainment's Starlight Casting System, in which he impressed the judges with his "artistic voice", and signed as trainee under SM Entertainment that same year. His label gave him the stage name Yesung which is derived from the Korean phrase "예술가의 성대; Yesulgaui seongdae; 'Vocal cords of an artist'", and can be translated as an "art-like voice". Yesung is a tenor.

== Career ==
=== 2005–2007: Debut, sub-unit debut and acting activities ===
Yesung officially debuted as part of 12-member project group Super Junior 05 on November 6, 2005, on SBS's music programme Popular Songs, performing their first single, "Twins (Knock Out)". Their debut album SuperJunior05 (Twins) was released a month later on December 5, 2005, and debuted at No. 3 on the monthly MIAK K-pop album charts.

In March 2006, SM Entertainment began to recruit new members for the next Super Junior generation. However, plans changed and the company declared a halt in forming future Super Junior generations. Following the addition of thirteenth member, Kyuhyun, the group dropped the suffix "05" and became officially credited as Super Junior. The re-polished group's first CD single "U" was released on June 7, 2006, which was their most successful single until the release of "Sorry, Sorry" in March 2009. In the fall of 2007, the group released their second official album, Don't Don, which became Super Junior's best-selling album and Korea's second best-selling album of the year.

From September 2006 to September 2007, Yesung was host for radio program, M.I.R.A.C.L.E for You, where members of Super Junior often appeared as guests. However, before the radio show's first anniversary, Yesung left to concentrate on Super Junior's second album, Don't Don. The last air date for the radio show was September 8, 2007. In November 2006, Yesung, along with Super Junior members Ryeowook and Kyuhyun, formed a subgroup, Super Junior-K.R.Y., a group specializing in R&B ballads. The trio debuted on November 5, 2006, on KBS's Music Bank with performing Hyena soundtrack called "The One I Love".

He debuted as an actor on July 26, 2007, with the release of Attack on the Pin-Up Boys, a high school comedy starring fellow Super Junior members. He played the school's rock star who gets attacked by a mysterious force.

=== 2008–2013: Super Junior-H, K.R.Y Japan debut and hiatus ===
On May 9, 2008, Yesung was sent to the hospital after he injured his leg during the 70 km 24-Hour Marathon of Hope in which he and bandmates Shindong, Sungmin, Leeteuk, Eunhyuk and Kangin participated. The event was in collaboration with the SBS charity program "Hope TV 24" and the money raised was donated to a Mongolian school in South Korea which was at risk of closing down. Due to the injury, Yesung was unable to complete the marathon, but appeared on stage on crutches with his fellow members. On August 8, Yesung was sent to the hospital after falling from a 1.5m stage while rehearsing at the KBS music program, Music Bank. The injury aggravated old injuries from the neck and waist and was hospitalised for two days. In June 2008, Yesung became a member of Super Junior-H, releasing their first mini-album titled Cooking? Cooking!. He sang ballad track "Love Really Hurts" for the original soundtrack of television drama Tazza, which aired from September 16, to November 25, 2008. In 2009, Yesung made his musical theatre debut in Namhansanseong (lit. South Korean Mountain Fortress), which is based on the novel of the same name by Kim Hoon, which is based on the historical incident of Byeongja Horan, at the Namhansanseong in Gyeonggi Province. But the musical focuses on the lives of common people and their spirit of survival during harsh situations. Yesung played villain "Jung Myung-soo", a servant-turned-interpreter who feels sad from being betrayed by his country, from October 9 to November 4, at the Seongnam Arts Center Opera House. On November 6, he made a surprise appearance on KBS' Music Bank with label mates SHINee in place of Jonghyun, who was recovering from influenza, in a performance of "Ring Ding Dong".

In 2010, Yesung starred in the title role of musical Hong Gil Dong, alongside bandmate Sungmin who also played the historical figure Hong Gildong. It played at the Woori Financial Art Hall at the Olympic Park from February 18, to April 18, 2010. On March 31, 2010, Yesung contributed to the OST of television drama Cinderella's Sister, starring Moon Geun-young and Chun Jung-myung. The song, "It Has to be You", is a pop ballad that tells the story about a man who refused to look for another girl, except for the one he loved. On June 4, Yesung performed it for the first time, and his first solo stage, on Music Bank which reached No. 3 on show's K-Chart.

In July 2010, Yesung appeared with bandmate Leeteuk as MC's for MBC's Love Pursuer. The show presents a Korean celebrity being showered with affection from a secret admirer, with the challenge of guessing who the admirer is. Yesung was himself the subject of admiration in episode 10. On September 4, he became the new MC for MUZIT, a musical talk show alongside K.Will and veteran composer Yoo Young-suk. It showcased various musical talents from the Korean music industry.

From October 1 to October 28, 2010, he starred in his third musical Spamalot playing the main role of Sir Galahad.

On December 29, 2010, Yesung together with Luna of f(x), sang the track "Loving You", on part two of the original soundtrack of KBS drama President.

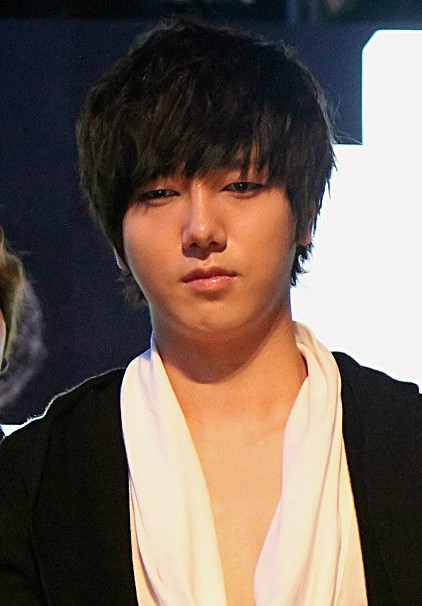
Yesung at MAMA in Singapore, November 2011.

On January 31, 2011, Yesung's third solo song, from the OST of SBS drama, Paradise Ranch, was released. "Waiting For You" is a ballad that tells the story of a man who is adamant on waiting until the end of the world for his lover to return to him. He performed it for the first time at the "Super Junior-K.R.Y The 1st Concert" in Seoul on February 11.

From February 28 to June 21, 2011, Yesung temporarily replaced bandmate Eunhyuk as radio DJ partnering with Leeteuk on Super Junior's Kiss the Radio, while Eunhyuk was away on promotional activities for Super Junior-M's third EP Perfection. In June, he joined KBS's Immortal Songs 2 where singers render their own versions of old songs from music legends and winners are selected by voting. He lost in the first episode but won the third episode when he sang Boohwal's song "The More I Love".

His second duet with Jang Hye-jin, was released on July 14, 2011, throughout Korea's digital charts. "I Am Behind You" is from the album Cooperation Part 1. The song has a fantastic harmony and is mixed with the lyrics of secretly loving someone and wondering if that person could possibly be feeling the same way about them. On July 18, 2011, "For One Day" was released. It is from the OST SBS historical drama Warrior Baek Dong Soo. The song explores an emotional farewell from a lover. Yesung performed this live for the first time on October 6, 2011, at the K.R.Y Concert in Nanjing. During the recording of Dream Team 2 on August 21, 2011, he fell from a platform and strained his waist again, but was reported to be a minor injury.

On September 27, 2011, he along with Eunhyuk and Shindong filled in for bandmate Heechul, who enlisted for mandatory military service on September 1, during the performance on Music Bank and Show! Music Core of Kim Jang-hoon latest single, "Breakups are So Like Me". Heechul is featured in the song and starred in the music video, which was completed the day before he enlisted.

On October 23, 2011, Yesung as part of Super Junior performed in the New York SM Town concert at Madison Square Garden. The cover photo of the New York Times, section C, featured Super Junior with a close up of Yesung.

On November 11, 2012, Yesung along with his brother Kim Jong-jin officially opened their café "Mouse Rabbit Coffee" after their franchise, "Babtols" and "Handel & Gretel".

In November 2012, Super Junior K.R.Y. held a concert tour in Japan, Super Junior K.R.Y. Special Winter Concert. They announced that they would be releasing their first single 6 years after debut. The teaser for "Promise You" was released on November 21, 2012, followed by the single on January 23, 2013. It debuted at number two on the Oricon's daily singles chart.

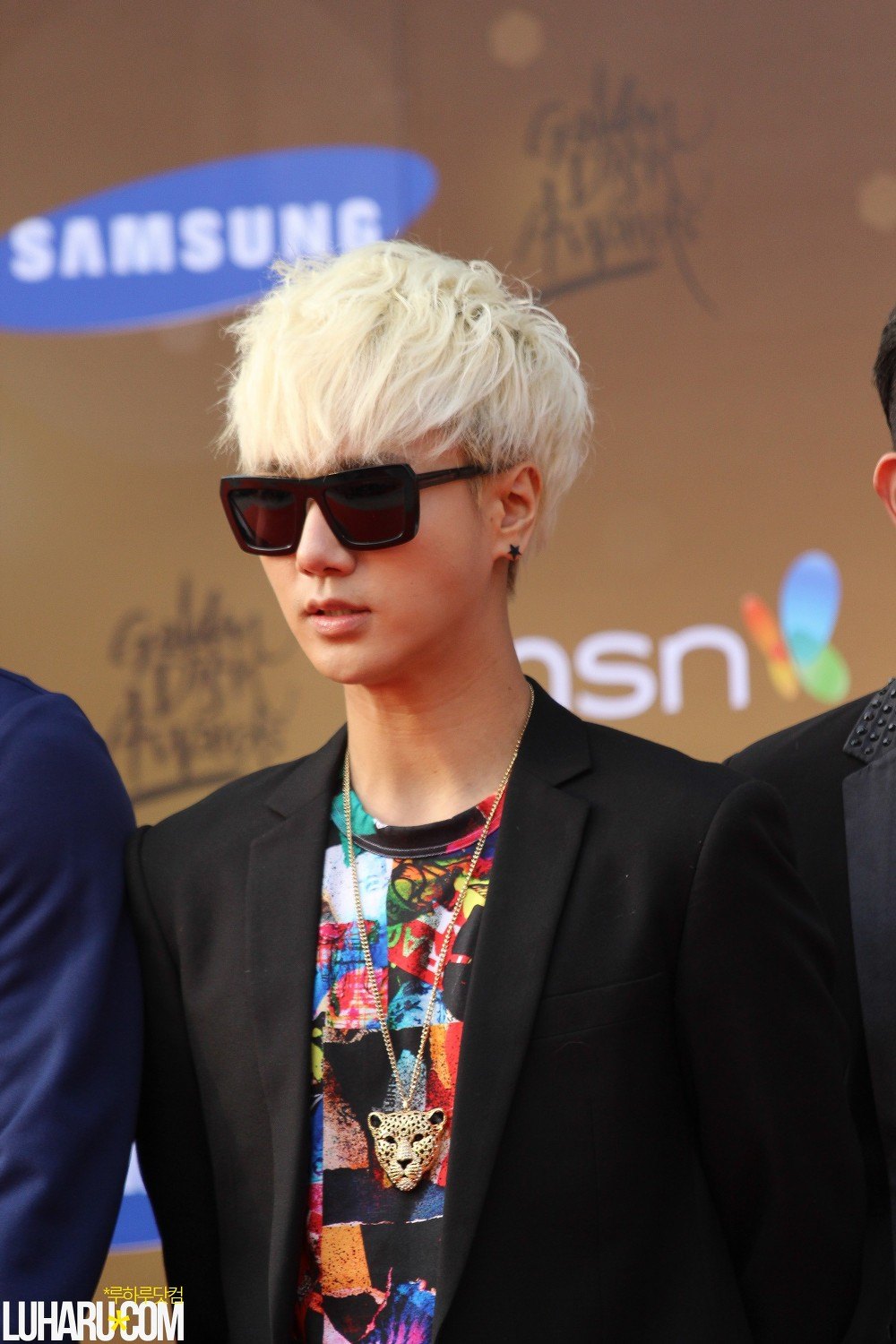
Yesung at 27th Golden Disk Awards Red Carpet in January 2013.

On February 13, 2013, Yesung's OST "Gray Paper" for SBS melodrama That Winter, the Wind Blows was released. The track was composed by label mate Kangta and where he went on to perform it on SBS's music program Inkigayo on February 17.

Yesung announced at the Seoul concert of Super Show 5 that he would enlist for his mandatory military service in 2013. He served as a public service worker after four weeks of basic training. He enlisted May 6, 2013, causing him to not take part in the South American leg of Super Show 5 onwards.

=== 2014–2015: SM The Ballad and continued comeback with Super Junior ===
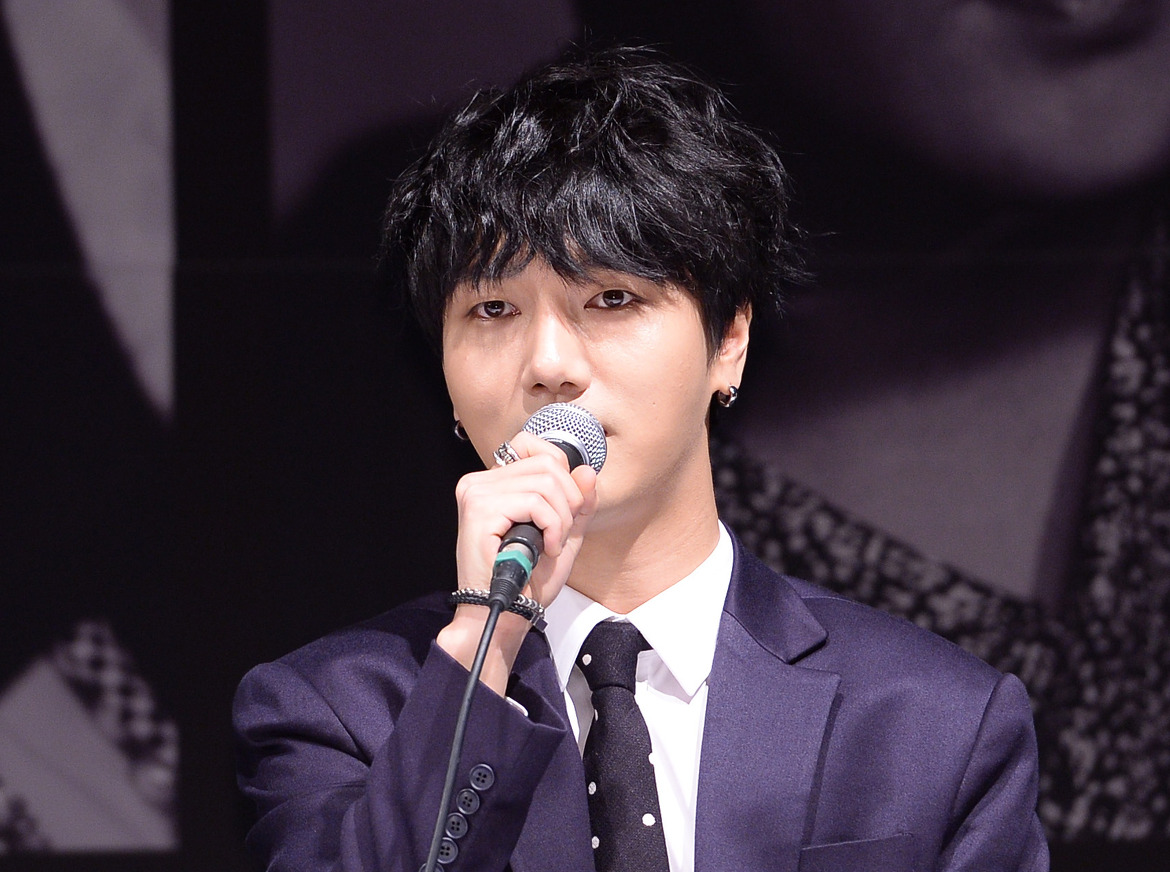
Yesung in July 2015, during Super Junior's press conference for Devil

During his military service in February 2014, Yesung joined the ballad group SM the Ballad, initially formed by SM Entertainment in 2010. On the group's second album, he had a solo song for the track "Blind", which releasing on Korean and Japanese version sung by Yesung, however didn't participate with the promotions.

Super Junior-K.R.Y. reunited with Yesung's return from military service Super Junior-K.R.Y. A Japan Tour was started in Yokohama on June 2 to 3 and had 11 total performances in arenas in Kobe, Fukuoka, and Nagoya. In July 2015, SM Entertainment announced Super Junior-K.R.Y. kick-started their Asia tour in Seoul at the Olympic Hall in Seoul on August 22 and 23. The trio released Japanese single Japan titled "Join Hands" on August 5, 2015.

On July 8, 2015, SM Entertainment announced that Yesung would re-join Super Junior for the special album, Devil which was released on July 16, to celebrate the group's 10th anniversary. At the press conference on July 15, he revealed that he has a vocal cord nodule which he credited for being too happy and overpracticed.

In August, Yesung solo song Dreaming from the OST of MBC drama, Splendid Politics was released. In November, Yesung played a role in Korean drama Songgot: The Piercer. On August 22, during the Super Junior-K.R.Y. concert, Yesung revealed that he had undergone a vocal nodule procedure two weeks before the concert and entered recovery phase.

=== 2016–present: Solo debut and collaborations ===
Yesung released his first EP Here I Am on April 19, 2016. The album contains seven tracks, with the lead single titled "Here I Am". Yesung made his solo debut stage on M Countdown on April 21. Yesung held his first solo concert titled Sweet Coffee, part of SM Entertainment concert series "The AGIT", held from June 3 to June 19, 2016.

On November 18, 2016, it was confirmed that Yesung would join OCN's upcoming drama Voice, to air in January 2017.

On April 18, 2017, Yesung released his second extended play titled Spring Falling. The album contains six tracks, with the lead single titled "Paper Umbrella".

In December 2018, Yesung released a digital single titled "Whatcha Doin'"(지금 어디야?)" with and Chungha. Later in January, 2019, Yesung released a digital Jazz single titled "Carpet" with Bumkey.

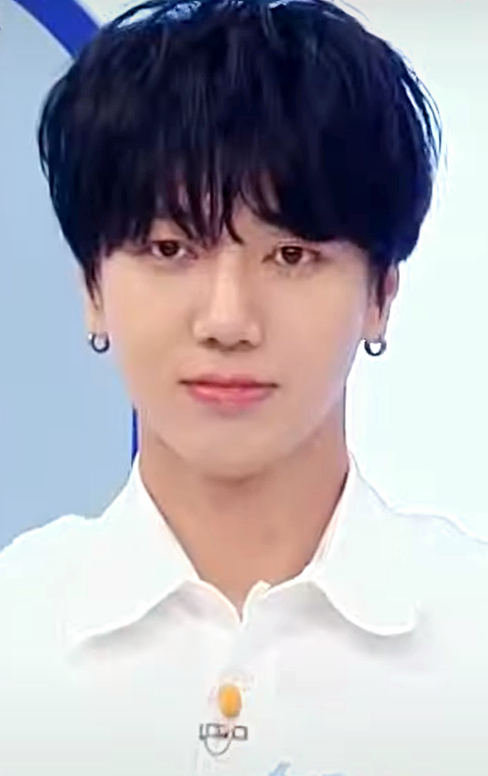
Yesung in 2021.

Yesung released his first Japanese album on February 20, 2019, titled Story. The album contains eleven tracks, with the lead singles titled "いま会いにゆきます (If You)" and "Because I Love You (大切な絆)". He also began his tour, Super Junior-Yesung Special Live – Y's STORY, in February 2019, with stops at Tokyo, Osaka, Nagoya and Fukuoka. On June 18, 2019, he released his third extended play, Pink Magic, with its lead single of the same name.

On May 3, 2021, Yesung released his fourth extended play Beautiful Night, consisting of seven tracks, including the lead single of the same name.

In October 2022, Yesung released the single "After Love" from the Casting in the Corner project with Solar, a remix of the 2006 version. He launched his YouTube channel that November, showcasing artistic content.

On January 2, 2023, Label SJ announced that Yesung will release his first Korean studio album by the end of the month. A week later, the album's name is revealed to be Sensory Flows and scheduled to be released on January 25 with its lead single "Small Things". The album features Mark of NCT and Winter of aespa, in the reissue album, Floral Sense. On May 24, he released his first Japanese EP, Kimi to Iu Sakura no Hanabira ga Boku no Kokoro ni Maiorita. Yesung had his third comeback of the year by releasing EP, Unfading Sense on October 4 to conclude the "Sensory Series". He would embark on his first solo Asia tour with the same name of the EP from October 2023 until January 2024.

On November 5, 2024, Yesung released his sixth Korean EP, It's Complicated.

== Discography ==
Korean studio albums

- Story (2019)
- Sensory Flows (2023)
- Where We Are (2026)

Japanese studio albums

- Sakihokoru Toki wo Matsu no wa (咲き誇る時を待つのは) (2026)

== Filmography ==
=== Films ===
Year	Title	Role	Notes	Ref.
2007	Attack on the Pin-Up Boys	Kim Yesung	Minor role as a rock band vocalist and a terror attack victim	
2010	Super Show 3 3D	Himself		
2012	I AM.	Himself	Biographical film of SM Town	
2013	Super Show 4 3D	Himself		
2016	My Korean Teacher	Yong-un	Japanese Film	
2022	The Girl on a Bulldozer	Go Yoo-seok		

=== Television series ===
Year	Title	Role	Notes	Ref.
2015	Songgot: The Piercer	Hwang Jun-chul	Adapted from a webtoon of the same name	
2017	Voice	Oh Hyun-ho	Season 1	

=== Television shows ===
Year	Title	Role	Notes	Ref.
2010–2011	Love Chaser	Host		
2010–2011, 2014	The Muzit	Host		
2018	Galaxy	Host		
2020–present	Super Junior Idol vs Idol	Host		
2021	We're Family	Cast Member	with Lim Na-young	
2017–2021	SJ Returns	Cast Member	Super Junior Members	

=== Radio shows ===
Year	Title	Station	Ref.
2006–2007	M.I.R.A.C.L.E for You	S-DMB	
2011	Super Junior's Kiss the Radio	KBS Cool FM	

== Musical theatre ==
Year	Title	Role	Notes	Ref.
2009	South Korean Mountain Fortress	Jung Myung-soo	Adapted from a novel with the same title	
2010	Hong Gildong	Hong Gildong		
2010	Spamalot	Sir Robin		
2018	Maybe, Happy Ending	Oliver		
2018–2019	Altar Boyz	Matthew		

== Concert and tours ==
South Korea

- The Agit: Sweet Coffee – Yesung (2016)
- Yesung Solo Concert '봄悲' (2017)

Japan

- Super Junior-Yesung Japan Tour 2016 ~Books~
- Super Junior-Yesung Special Live "Y's SONG" (2017)
- Super Junior-Yesung Special Live "Y's STORY" (2019)

Asia

- Yesung Solo Concert: Unfading Sense (2023–2024)
- Yesung Concert [It's Complicated] (2025)

== Awards and nominations ==
Name of the award ceremony, year presented, category, nominee of the award, and the result of the nomination
Award ceremony	Year	Category	Nominee / Work	Result	Ref.
BGM Cyworld	2010	Hall of Fame	"It Has To Be You"	Won	
Cyworld Digital Music Awards	2010	Song of the Month (April)	"It Has To Be You"	Won	
Cyworld Digital Music Awards	2011	Best OST Award	"It Has To Be You"	Won	
Golden Disc Awards	2010	Digital Bonsang	"It Has To Be You"	Nominated	
Golden Disc Awards	2010	Popularity Award	"It Has To Be You"	Nominated	
Golden Disc Awards	2017	Album Bonsang	Here I Am	Nominated	
MelOn Music Awards	2010	Special Song OST Award	"It Has to be You"	Nominated	
The Musical Awards	2011	Best New Actor Award	Spamalot	Nominated	
