= Beautiful Night (EP) =

2021 EP by Yesung

- LP Version cover

EP by Yesung
- Released: May 3, 2021
- Recorded: 2020–21
- Studios: Doobdoob (Seoul); SM Big Shot (Seoul); SM Blue Ocean (Seoul); SM Concert Hall (Seoul); SM Yellow Tail (Seoul)
- Genres: City pop; indie pop; dream pop; R&B
- Length: 26:30
- Language: Korean
- Labels: SM; Label SJ; Dreamus
- Producers: Lee Soo-man; St Nox; Jake K; Ryan S. Jhun; Park Min-soo; Jeon Myung-hoon; DJ HotBoyzZ; Park Moon-chi; Chimmi; Atomik; Koh Young-bae; ZigZag Note

Yesung chronology
Pink Magic (2019)	Beautiful Night (2021)	Sensory Flows (2023)

Singles from Beautiful Night
- 1. "Phantom Pain" Released: April 23, 2021; 2. "Beautiful Night" Released: May 3, 2021

Music video
- "Phantom Pain" on YouTube

Beautiful Night is the fourth EP by South Korean singer Yesung. It was released on May 3, 2021, by SM Entertainment and Label SJ, and distributed by Dreamus. The EP consists of seven tracks in total, including the lead single of the same name.

The EP is Yesung's first solo release to top the Gaon Albums Chart.

== Background ==
On March 16, 2021, Super Junior released their tenth studio album, The Renaissance, which was originally planned to be released in December 2020, but it was delayed three times to perfect its quality. Among them was pre-release single, "The Melody" which was written by Yesung and bandmate Leeteuk, that was released on November 6, 2020, coinciding with the band's 15th anniversary.

In April, SM Entertainment announced that Yesung would release his fourth extended play in May, following the release of Pink Magic back in June 2019. Pre-release single "Phantom Pain" was released on April 24 to generate fan hype for the comeback. Beautiful Night was announced as the name for the EP on April 26 with the EP set to appear in cassette tape format to evoke analog nostalgia. Yesung held commentary video on Super Junior's YouTube channel to explain the seven tracks of the EP later that evening.

"Beautiful Night" was announced as the lead single and the artists that were involved in the EP's composition was revealed on the 27th. The next day, another teaser image was uploaded to social media with the song "A Letter in the Wind" accompanying the highlight clip. Yesung announced he will hold a livestream on SM Town's V Live channel on May 3, an hour before the EP's release and another highlight clip was uploaded with the song "Corazón Perdido (Lost Heart)", a dream pop-rock alongside it. On April 30, a teaser video for the music video confirmed that actress Park Gyu-young would be featured in the music video for "Beautiful Night".

On May 3, the music video for lead single "Beautiful Night" was released on 6 PM KST alongside the EP.

== Composition ==
In an interview with iMBC, Yesung explained that he thought a lot of what music people would enjoy when they are listening to him. As such, he was involved in the EP's overall concept, costumes, and the music videos.

The lead single, "Beautiful Night," is classified into a city pop genre. The song's second half features a more dynamic and rhythmic brass arrangement along with a prominently featured nostalgic tone. Yesung chose this song as a title track because he liked the theme of the song and added that city pop is perfect for transition from spring to summer.

Pre-release single "Phantom Pain" is the second track of the album. Classified as an indie pop song, the track features a soft electric guitar and rhythmic drum sound in the background with its lyrics likening a breakup into a medical condition of the same name as the track.

"Corazón Perdido (Lost Heart)" is a dream pop song fused with rock flavor featuring a lyrical acoustic guitar and a heavy bass in the background before the song became more energetic due to Yesung's vocals.

"Fireworks" is the second city pop genre song from the album. The lyrics are about the colors of fireworks and how they made singer felt sparkling like them. The song is accompanied by a bouncy bass line and synthesizers.

"No More Love" is another dream pop song in the album, featuring calming lyrics with minimalist band sounds.

"Like Us" is an R&B song with its lyrics explaining that an excitement would not fade as time goes. The song is accompanied by an electric piano and a guitar melody resembling a spring breeze.

The last track, "A Letter in the Wind" is a poetic song describing the singer's love for the interlocutor so that it can be blown by the wind to reach them.

== Promotion ==
The promotion of the album was preceded with release of the music video for "Phantom Pain", on April 23. Three days later on April 26, Yesung talked about the creation of the album in a video uploaded in Super Junior's YouTube channel. The music video for the lead single "Beautiful Night" is released on the same day as the album's release on May 3. The following day on May 4, Yesung released a behind the scenes video of the "Phantom Pain" and "Beautiful Night" music videos.

=== Live performances ===
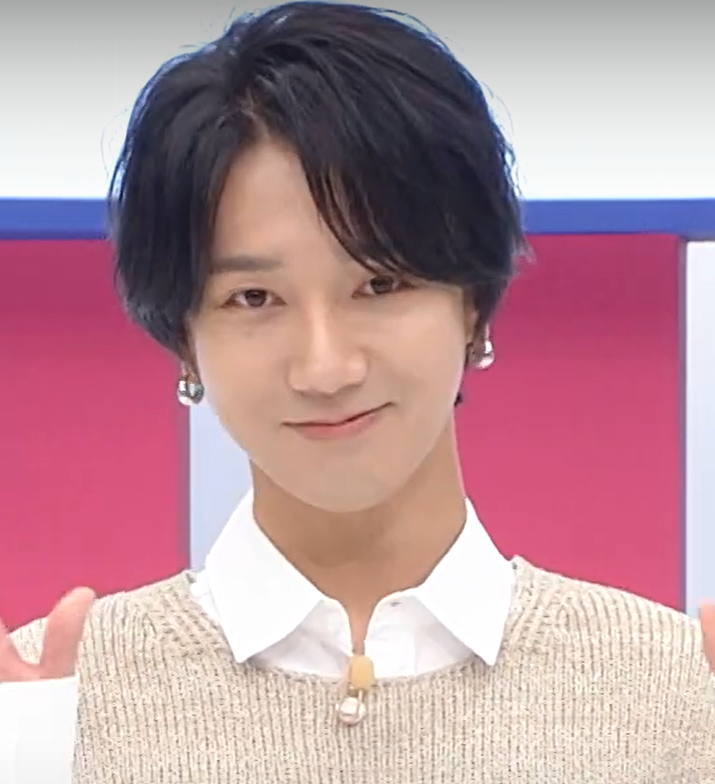
Yesung promoting the I'll Light Your Way concert in 2021.

Yesung performed several songs from the EP in his online fan meeting concert, Yesung Special Event: "I'll Light Your Way" on July 25, 2021. "Corazón Perdido (Lost Heart)" was later included in Super Junior's Super Show 9: Road world tour in 2022. It would later be included with "Like Us" for Yesung's Unfading Sense concert from 2023 to 2024.

== Track listing ==
Beautiful Night track listing
No.	Title	Lyrics	Music	Arrangement	Length
1.	"Beautiful Night"	Nokdu	Nokdu; St Nox; Jake K	St Nox; Jake K	3:39
2.	"Phantom Pain"	Park Min-soo	Ryan S. Jhun; Park Min-soo; Jeon Myung-hoon	Ryan S. Jhun; Park Min-soo; Jeon Myung-hoon	3:38
3.	"Corazón Perdido (Lost Heart)"	Bryan Cho; Ryan Colt Levy; Cliff Lin	DJ HotBoyzZ	DJ HotBoyzZ	4:22
4.	"Fireworks"	Park Moon-chi; Oiaisle; Noday	Noday; Park Moon-chi; Oiaisle	Park Moon-chi	3:35
5.	"No More Love"	Atomik	Chimmi; Atomik	Chimmi; Atomik	3:21
6.	"Like Us" (이렇게 우리는; Ireoke urineun; 'This is how we')	Koh Young-bae	Koh Young-bae	Kim Dong-min; Lee Tae-wook; Koh Young-bae	3:30
7.	"A Letter in the Wind" (바람결에 날려 보아요; Baramgyeore nallyeo boayo; 'Let the wind blow')	ZigZag Note; Joni	ZigZag Note; Joni	ZigZag Note	4:28
Total length:					26:30

== Charts ==
Chart performance for Beautiful Night
Chart (2021)	Peak position
Japanese Albums (Oricon)	17
South Korean Albums (Gaon)	1

=== Monthly charts ===
Monthly chart performance for Beautiful Night
Chart (2021)	Peak position
South Korea Albums (Gaon)	9

== Release history ==
Release history for Beautiful Night
Region	Date	Format	Label	Ref
South Korea	May 3, 2021	CD; cassette	SM; Label SJ; Dreamus	
Various	May 3, 2021	Digital download; streaming	SM; Label SJ	
South Korea	May 21, 2021	LP	SM; Label SJ; Dreamus	
