= Here I Am (EP) =

- Here I Am album cover

EP by Yesung
- Released: April 19, 2016
- Recorded: 2016
- Studio: Doobdoob (Seoul); In Grid (Seoul); Seoul; SM Blue Cup (Seoul); SM Blue Ocean (Seoul); SM Concert Hall (Seoul); SM Yellow Tail (Seoul)
- Genre: R&B; K-ballad
- Length: 27:38
- Language: Korean
- Label: Label SJ; SM; KT
- Producer: Tak Young-jun; Yesung

Yesung chronology
Here I Am (2016)	Spring Falling (2017)

Singles from Here I Am
- 1. "Here I Am" Released: April 19, 2016

Here I Am is the first extended play by South Korean singer, Yesung. It was released on April 19, 2016 by SM Entertainment and Label SJ, and distributed by KT Music.

== Background and release ==
On April 12, 2016, S.M. Entertainment announced that Yesung would be releasing his first EP called Here I Am on April 19. On April 13, SM Entertainment revealed the album title track "Here I Am", produced by Brother Su and Yesung. On April 14, SM Entertainment released this album highlight medley video and confirming the participation of Exo's Chanyeol. On April 19, the title track "Here I Am" music video was released. Yesung made his solo debut stage on M Countdown on April 21.

== Track listing ==
Official track list
No.	Title	Lyrics	Music	Arrangement	Length
1.	"Here I Am" (문 열어봐; Mun yeoreobwa; 'Open the door')	Yesung; Brother Su	Yesung; Brother Su	Eco Bridge	4:28
2.	"Spring in Me" (벚꽃잎; Beotkkonnip; 'Cherry blossom petals'; Duet. Dalchong)	Polar Bear; Jerry L; Han Hee-jun	Polar Bear; Jerry L; Han Hee-jun	Polar Bear; Jerry L	4:31
3.	"Between"	Shin Agnes; Hwang Hyun (MonoTree)	Kim Yoo-seok; Chu Dae-kwan (MonoTree)	Kim Yoo-seok; Chu Dae-kwan (MonoTree)	3:26
4.	"We" (우리; Uri)	4th Hitter; NomNomNom	4th Hitter; NomNomNom	4th Hitter	3:41
5.	"Your Echo" (메아리; Meari; 'Echo')	Jo Yoon-kyung	ZigZag Note	ZigZag Note	4:39
6.	"Confession" (어떤 말로도; Eotteon mallodo; 'In no words'; feat. Chanyeol of EXO)	Yesung; Brother Su	Yesung; Brother Su	Hwang Seong-je	3:56
7.	"My Dear" (달의 노래; Darui norae; 'Song of the Moon')	Yesung; Yang Jae-seon	이방원사단	이방원사단	3:13

== Chart performance ==
=== Album charts ===
Chart (2016)	Peak position	Sales
South Korean Gaon Weekly Albums Chart	2	KOR: 42,721+
South Korean Gaon Monthly Albums Chart	7	KOR: 42,721+
South Korean Gaon Year-End Albums Chart		KOR: 42,721+

=== Single charts ===
Here I Am

Chart (2016)	Peak position	Sales
South Korean Gaon Weekly Singles Chart	43	60,777+
South Korean Gaon Weekly Download Chart	23	60,777+

=== Other charted songs ===
Title	Peak chart position	Sales
Title	KOR Gaon	Sales
"Confession"	133	KOR: 21,890+ (digital downloads only)
"Spring In Me"	182	KOR: 17,596 + (digital downloads only)
"Between"	250	KOR: 8,987+ (digital downloads only)
"We"	270	KOR: 8,614+ (digital downloads only)
"My Dear"	280	KOR: 8,233+ (digital downloads only)
"Your Echo"	294	KOR: 7,664+ (digital downloads only)

== Release history ==
Release history for Here I Am
Region	Date	Format	Label
South Korea	April 19, 2016	CD	SM; Label SJ; KT
Various	April 19, 2016	Digital download; streaming	SM; Label SJ
