= Label SJ =

South Korean record label

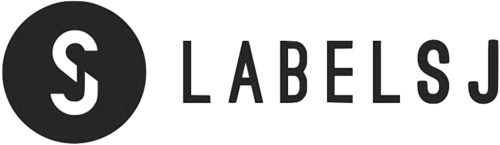
- Parent company: SM Entertainment
- Founded: 2015
- Defunct: 2023
- Status: Inactive
- Distributors: SM Entertainment; Genie Music (2015–2018); Dreamus (2018–2023)
- Genre: K-pop
- Country of origin: South Korea

Label SJ was an exclusive label established by South Korean record label SM Entertainment for boy band Super Junior on November 6, 2015.

== History ==
On 6 November 2015, Super Junior's 10th anniversary since their debut, SM Entertainment announced that Super Junior had their own exclusive label management, Label SJ. SM stated, "We established Label SJ to give Super Junior our wholehearted support and an ideal system for managing the group." Though the new label will be affiliated with SM, it will be independently and wholly responsible for Super Junior's management, producing their albums, and all group, unit, and individual activities.

In March 2023, with the implementation of SM 3.0 restructuring of the company's business strategy, Label SJ was folded back into SM and absorbed into the label's production center 5 (Wizard Production), which also manages Exo and Riize.

== Former Artists ==
Groups

- Kim Heechul & Kim Jungmo (2015–2019)
- Super Junior (2015–2023)

Sub-units

- Super Junior-D&E (2011–2023)
- Super Junior-K.R.Y. (2015–2023)
- Super Junior-T (2015–2023)
- Super Junior-M (2015–2023)
- Super Junior-H (2015–2023)

Soloists

- Donghae (2015–2023)
- Eunhyuk (2015–2023)
- Heechul (2015–2023)
- Henry (2015–2018)
- Kangin (Note: Although Kangin has departed from Super Junior, he remains signed under Label SJ.) (2015–2023)
- Kim Jung-mo (2015–2019)
- Kyuhyun (2015–2023)
- Ryeowook (2015–2023)
- Sungmin (2015–2023)
- Yesung (2015–2023)
- Zhou Mi (2015–2023)

== Discography ==
2016

Released	Title	Artist(s)	Type	Format
January 28	The Little Prince	Ryeowook	EP (Mini Album)	CD, Download
April 19	Here I Am	Yesung	EP (Mini Album)	CD, Download
July 12	Goody Bag	Kim Heechul & Kim Jungmo	EP (Mini Album)	CD, Download
July 19	What's Your Number?	Zhou Mi	EP (Mini Album)	CD, Download
November 10	Waiting, Still	Kyuhyun	EP (Mini Album)	CD, Download

2017

Released	Title	Artist(s)	Type	Format
February 16	"Blah Blah (Thai Ver.)"	Kyuhyun	Digital single	Download
March 18	"Girlfriend"	Henry	Digital single	Download
April 18	Spring Falling	Yesung	EP (Mini Album)	CD, Download
April 29	"Real Love"	Henry	Digital single	Download
May 10	"Real Love (Acoustic Version)"	Henry	Digital single	Download
May 24	"Goodbye For Now"	Kyuhyun	Digital single	Download
June 22	"I'm Good"	Henry	Digital single	Download
August 30	"That One"	Henry	Digital single	Download
November 6	Play	Super Junior	Studio album	CD, Download
November 28	Play (Pause Ver.)	Super Junior	Studio album	CD

2018

Released	Title	Artist(s)	Type	Format
February 2	"Monster"	Henry	Digital single	Download
April 12	Replay	Super Junior	Studio Album Repackage	CD, Download
April 20	"I Don't Care"	Zhou Mi	Digital single	Download
August 16	'Bout You	Super Junior-D&E	EP (Mini Album)	CD, Download
October 8	One More Time	Super Junior	EP (Mini Album)	CD, Download
December 17	"Whatcha Doin'"	Yesung, Chung Ha	Digital single	Download
December 19	"The Lonely Flame"	Zhou Mi	Digital single	Download

2019

Released	Title	Artist(s)	Type	Format
January 2	Drunk on Love	Ryeowook	EP (Mini Album)	CD, Download
April 14	Danger	Super Junior-D&E	EP (Mini Album)	CD, Download
April 24	"Old Movie"	Kim Hee-chul	Digital single	Download
May 9	"The Lonely Flame" (Japanese ver.)	Zhou Mi	Digital single	Download
May 14	"Time With You"	Kyuhyun	Digital single	Download
May 20	The Day We Meet Again	Kyuhyun	Single Album	CD, Download
June 18	Pink Magic	Yesung	EP (Mini Album)	CD, Download
October 14	Time_Slip	Super Junior	Studio Album	CD, Download
November 22	Orgel	Sungmin	EP (Mini Album)	CD, Download

2020

Released	Title	Artist(s)	Type	Format
January 28	Timeless	Super Junior	Studio Album Repackage	CD, Download
February 23	"Harmony"	Donghae (feat. BewhY)	Digital single	Download
February 28	"I'll Be There"	Zhou Mi (feat. Kun & Xiaojun of WayV)	Digital single	Download
June 8	When We Were Us	Super Junior-K.R.Y.	EP (Mini Album)	CD, Download
June 22	"Starry Night"	Zhou Mi (with. Ryeowook)	Digital Single	Download
July 23	"Dreaming"	Kyuhyun	Digital Single	Download
September 3	Bad Blood	Super Junior-D&E	EP (Mini Album)	CD, Download
October 8	"Daystar"	Kyuhyun	Digital Single	Download
November 11	"The Melody"	Super Junior	Digital Single	Download

2021

Released	Title	Artist(s)	Type	Format
January 26	"Moving On"	Kyuhyun	Digital Single	Download
March 16	The Renaissance	Super Junior	Studio Album	CD, Download
April 13	"Coffee"	Kyuhyun	Digital Single	Download
May 3	Beautiful Night	Yesung	EP (Mini Album)	Cassette, CD, LP record, Download
July 5	"Together"	Kyuhyun	Digital Single	Download
September 7	"Goodnight, Summer"	Sungmin	Digital Single	Download
October 13	"California Love"	Donghae	Digital Single	Download
October 20	"be"	Eunhyuk	Digital Single	Download
November 2	Countdown	Super Junior-D&E	Studio Album	CD, Download

2022

Released	Title	Artist(s)	Type	Format
January 25	Love Story (4 Season Project 季)	Kyuhyun	EP (Mini Album)	CD, Download
February 28	The Road : Winter for Spring	Super Junior	Single Album	CD, Download
May 3	A Wild Rose	Ryeowook	EP (Mini Album)	CD, Download
July 12	The Road : Keep on Going	Super Junior	Studio Album	CD, Download
December 15	The Road: Celebration	Super Junior	Studio Album	CD, Download

=== Wizard Production ===
Note: (Note: The Album was produced under the implementation of SM 3.0, Super Junior Album is taken care by Production Center 5 (Wizard Production))

2023

Released	Title	Artist(s)	Type	Format
January 25	Sensory Flows – The 1st Album	Yesung	Studio Album	CD, Download
February 27	Floral Sense – The 1st Album Special Ver.	Yesung	Studio Album Repackage	CD, Download

== Filmography ==
Year	Title	Network	Members	Ref.
2017–2021	SJ Returns (Season 1–4)	Naver TV, V Live, JTBC2	All without Kangin; Cameo: Sungmin	
2018	Super TV (Season 1, 2)	XtvN, tvN	All without Kangin, Sungmin and Kyuhyun	
