= List of songs written by Super Junior =

Super Junior (Korean: 슈퍼주니어; RR: Syupeojunieo) is a South Korean boy band. Formed in 2005 by producer Lee Soo-man of SM Entertainment, the group comprised a total of thirteen members at its peak. Super Junior originally debuted with twelve members, consisting of leader Leeteuk, Heechul, Hangeng, Yesung, Kangin, Shindong, Sungmin, Eunhyuk, Siwon, Donghae, Ryeowook and Kibum. Kyuhyun joined the group in 2006.

== Super Junior ==
Songs written for Super Junior
Year	Song	Album	Lyrics		Music		Notes
Year	Song	Album	Credited	written	Credited	Compose	Notes
2005	"Show Me Your Love"	Winter Single	Yes	Heechul, Shindong, Eunhyuk	No	—N/a	Rap written
2005	Twins	"Over"	Yes	Heechul, Eunhyuk	No	—N/a	Rap written
2005	Twins	"L.o.v.e"	Yes	Kibum, Eunhyuk	No	—N/a	Rap written
2005	Twins	"Rock This House"	Yes	Eunhyuk	No	—N/a	Rap written
2006	"U"	Digital Single	Yes	Eunhyuk	No	—N/a	Rap written
2007	"Sapphire Blue"	Don't Don	Yes	Eunhyuk	No	—N/a	Rap written
2007	"Disco Drive"	Don't Don	Yes	Eunhyuk, Shindong	No	—N/a	Rap written
2007	"Midnight Fantasy"	Don't Don	Yes	Eunhyuk	No	—N/a	Rap written
2007	"Mirror"	Don't Don	Yes	Eunhyuk, Donghae	No	—N/a	Rap written
2007	"Missin’ U"	Don't Don	Yes	Eunhyuk	No	—N/a	Rap written
2007	"Marry U"	Don't Don	Yes	Eunhyuk, Donghae	No	—N/a	Rap written
2007	"You’re My Endless Love"	Don't Don	Yes	Eunhyuk	No	—N/a	Rap written
2007	"Song For You"	Don't Don	Yes	Eunhyuk, Donghae	No	—N/a	Rap written
2007	"I Am"	Don't Don	Yes	Leeteuk, Eunhyuk, Sungmin, Donghae	No	—N/a	Written
2009	"Shining Star"	Sorry, Sorry	Yes	Eunhyuk	No	—N/a	Rap written
2009	"Reset"	Sorry, Sorry	Yes	Eunhyuk	No	—N/a	Rap written
2009	"She Wants It"	It's You	Yes	Eunhyuk	No	—N/a	Rap written
2009	"Love U More"	It's You	Yes	Ryeowook, Sungmin	Yes	Ryeowook	Written
2010	"Here We Go"	Bonamana	Yes	Eunhyuk	No	—N/a	Rap written
2010	"Boom Boom"	Bonamana	Yes	Eunhyuk	No	—N/a	Rap written
2010	"Shake It Up"	Bonamana	Yes	Eunhyuk	No	—N/a	Rap written
2010	"No Other"	No Other	Yes	Eunhyuk	No	—N/a	Rap written
2010	"A Short Journey"	No Other	Yes	Eunhyuk, Donghae	Yes	Eunhyuk, Donghae	
2010	"All My Heart"	No Other	No	—N/a	Yes	Leeteuk, Henry	
2011	"Oops!"	A-CHa	Yes	Shindong, Leeteuk, Donghae, Eunhyuk, Heechul	No	—N/a	Wrote their parts
2011	"White Christmas"	A-CHa	Yes	Eunhyuk	No	—N/a	Rap written
2011	"Y"	A-CHa	Yes	Donghae, Chance, Super D	Yes	Eunhyuk, Donghae	Written by Donghae, Chance + Rap written by Eunhyuk, Donghae
2011	"Andante"	A-CHa	No	—N/a	Yes	Leeteuk, Henry, Kim Kyu Won	
2012	"Gulliver"	Sexy, Free & Single	No	—N/a	Yes	Eunhyuk	Written
2012	"Haru"	SPY	Yes	Donghae, Kwon Soon Il	Yes	Donghae, Eunhyuk, Shindong, Kwon Soon Il	Written by Donghae, Kwon Soon Il + Rap written by Eunhyuk, Shindong
2012	"Outsider"	SPY	No	—N/a	Yes	Eunhyuk	Rap written
2012	"Only U"	SPY	Yes	Leeteuk, Lee Jae-myoung	Yes	Leeteuk, Donghae, Eunhyuk	Written by Leeteuk, Donghae + Rap written by Eunhyuk
2014	"Shirt"	Mamacita	Yes	Donghae, Team One Sound	Yes	Donghae, Team One Sound	Written
2014	"Don't Leave Me"	This Is Love	Yes	Choi Si-won, Iconic Sounds	Yes	Choi Siwon, 220, Iconic Sounds	
2015	"Don't Wake Me Up"	Devil	Yes	Donghae, Team One Sound	Yes	Donghae, Team One Sound	
2015	"Forever With You"	Devil	Yes	Zhou Mi	No	—N/a	
2015	"Alright"	Devil	Yes	Donghae, Eunhyuk, Team One Sound	Yes	Donghae, Team One Sound	
2015	"You Got It"	Magic	Yes	Leeteuk, Heechul, Eunhyuk, Team One Sound	No	—N/a	
2015	"Sarang♥"	Magic	Yes	Heechul, Team One Sound	Yes	Leeteuk, Team One Sound	
2017	"Scene Stealer"	Play	Yes	Eunhyuk	No	—N/a	
2017	"One More Chance"	Play	Yes	Donghae, J-dub, Eunhyuk	Yes	Donghae, J-dub	Written by Donghae, J-dub + Rap written by Eunhyuk
2017	"Good Day For a Good Day"	Play	Yes	Eunhyuk	No	—N/a	Rap written
2017	"Girlfriend"	Play	Yes	Eunhyuk	No	—N/a	Rap written
2017	"Spin Up!"	Play	Yes	Heechul, Eunhyuk	No	—N/a	Rap written
2017	"I do"	Play	Yes	Heechul	No	—N/a	Rap written
2017	"On and On"	On and On	No	—N/a	Yes	Siwon	
2018	"Lo Siento"	Replay	Yes	Heechul, Eunhyuk, Leslie Grace	No	Play-N-Skillz	Rap written
2018	"Hug"	Replay	Yes	Yesung	Yes	Yesung	
2018	"Super Duper"	Replay	Yes	Leeteuk, Team One Sound	Yes	Leeteuk, Team One Sound	
2018	"Me & U"	Replay	Yes	Eunhyuk	No	—N/a	
2019	"I Think I"	Time_Slip	Yes	Eunhyuk, January 8, Jo Yoon-kyung	No	—N/a	
2019	"Game"	Time_Slip	Yes	Heechul, Eunhyuk, ZNEE (153/Joombes), Jung Ku-ru & Kim Ji-soo (Jam Factory)	No	—N/a	
2019	"No Drama"	Time_Slip	Yes	Leeteuk, Oneway	Yes	Leeteuk, Oneway	
2020	"Rock Your Body"	Timeless	Yes	Donghae, J-Dub	Yes	Donghae, J-Dub	
2020	"I Think I -Japanese Version-"	I Think U	Yes	Eunhyuk, January 8, Jo Yoon-kyung, h.toyosaki	No	—N/a	
2020	"BLUE"	I Think U	No	—N/a	Yes	Leeteuk, Young Sky	
2020	"愛が教えてくれたこと" (Ai ga oshiete kureta koto)	I Think U	No	—N/a	Yes	Donghae, J-Dub	
2020	"The Melody"	The Renaissance	Yes	Leeteuk, Yesung, Min Yeon-jae	No	—N/a	
2022	"Always"	The Road : Keep on Going	Yes	Eunhyuk, U1 (153/Joombas), Yi Yi-jin	No	—N/a	
2025	"Finale"	Super Junior25	No	—N/a	Yes	Donghae, Rokstaxil, Jelly, 17, Ham Sung-hoon, Ryan Shin	

== Super Junior-T ==
Songs written for Super Junior-T
Year	Song	Album	Lyrics		Music		Notes
Year	Song	Album	Credited	written	Credited	Compose	Notes
2007	"Don’t go away"	Rokuko	Yes	Eunhyuk	No	—N/a	Rap written
2007	"First Express"	Rokuko	Yes	Eunhyuk	No	—N/a	Rap written
2007	"Rokuko"	Rokuko	Yes	Eunhyuk	No	—N/a	Rap written

== Super Junior-H ==
Songs written for Super Junior-H
Year	Song	Album	Lyrics		Music		Notes
Year	Song	Album	Credited	Written	Credited	Compose	Notes
2008	"Good Luck!!"	Cooking? Cooking!	Yes	Eunhyuk	No	—N/a	Rap written
2008	"Sunny"	Cooking? Cooking!	Yes	Eunhyuk, Shindong	No	—N/a	Rap written
2008	"Good Luck!!"	Cooking? Cooking!	Yes	Eunhyuk	No	—N/a	Rap co-written

== Super Junior-M ==
Songs written for Super Junior-M
Year	Song	Album	Lyrics		Music		Notes
Year	Song	Album	Credited	Written	Credited	Compose	Notes
2008	"Love Song (爱你爱你)"	Me	Yes	Zhou Mi	No	—N/a	Chinese lyrics
2008	"Marry U" (remake of Marry U Korean Vers.)"	Me	Yes	Zhou Mi	No	—N/a	Chinese lyrics
2008	"A Man In Love (渴望)" (remake of "A Man In Love (갈증)")	Me	Yes	Zhou Mi	No	—N/a	Chinese lyrics
2009	"Confession"	Super Girl	Yes	Zhou Mi	No	—N/a	Chinese lyrics
2009	"You and Me"	Super Girl	Yes	Zhou Mi	No	—N/a	Chinese lyrics
2011	"Off My Mind"	Perfection	Yes	Henry	Yes	Henry	
2011	"True Love"	Perfection	Yes	Zhou Mi	No	—N/a	Chinese Lyrics
2013	"Tunnel"	Break Down	Yes	Zhou Mi	No	—N/a	
2013	"Go"	Break Down	Yes	Zhou Mi	Yes	The NoizeBank (Henry + his friends)	
2013	"It’s You"	Break Down	Yes	Zhou Mi, Tina wang	Yes	The NoizeBank (Henry + his friends)	
2014	"Fly High"	Swing	Yes	Zhou Mi	No	—N/a	
2014	"Swing"	Swing	Yes	Zhou Mi	No	—N/a	

== Super Junior-D&E ==
Songs written for Super Junior-D&E
Year	Song	Album	Lyrics		Music		Notes
Year	Song	Album	Credited	Written	Credited	Compose	Notes
2011	"Oppa, Oppa"	Digital single	Yes	Donghae, Peter	Yes	Donghae, Peter	
2013	"Still You"	Digital single	Yes	Donghae, Team One Sound	Yes	Donghae, Team One Sound	Donghae, Team One Sound + Rap written by Eunhyuk
2014	"Ride Me"	Ride Me	Yes	Eunhyuk	No	—N/a	Rap written
2014	"Wonderland"	Skeleton	Yes	Donghae	Yes	Donghae	
2015	"Growing Pains"	The Beat Goes On	Yes	Donghae, Team One Sound	Yes	Donghae, Team One Sound	
2015	"Mother"	The Beat Goes On	Yes	Donghae, Team One Sound	Yes	Donghae, Team One Sound	
2015	"1+1=Love"	The Beat Goes On (Special Edition)	Yes	Donghae, Team One Sound	Yes	Donghae, Team One Sound	
2015	"Love That I Need"	The Beat Goes On (Special Edition)	Yes	Donghae, Eunhyuk	No	—N/a	
2015	"Let's Get It On"	Let's Get It On	No	—N/a	Yes	Henry, Neo Gen Rong, Mage	
2018	"If You"	Style	Yes	Donghae, Hasegawa	Yes	Donghae, JDUB	
2018	"Hot Babe"	Style	Yes	Eunhyuk, Gashima	Yes	Eunhyuk, Jake K	
2018	"'Bout You"	'Bout You	Yes	Donghae, Eunhyuk, JDUB	Yes	Donghae, JDUB	
2018	"Lost"	'Bout You	Yes	Donghae, JDUB	Yes	Donghae, JDUB	
2018	"Illusion (Obsessed)"	'Bout You	Yes	Eunhyuk	Yes	Eunhyuk, Jake K, Andreas Oberg, Chris Wahle	
2018	"Victory (*Special Track)"	'Bout You	Yes	Donghae, JDUB	Yes	Donghae, JDUB	
2019	"Danger"	Danger	Yes	Donghae, JDUB	Yes	Donghae, JDUB	
2019	"Gloomy"	Danger	Yes	Donghae, JDUB	Yes	Donghae, JDUB	
2019	"Dreamer"	Danger	Yes	Eunhyuk, Joombas	No	—N/a	
2019	"Sunrise (Korean Version)"	Danger	Yes	Donghae, Eunhyuk, JDUB	Yes	Donghae, JDUB	
2019	"If You (Korean Version)"	Danger	Yes	Donghae, JDUB	Yes	Donghae, JDUB	
2020	"B.A.D."	Bad Blood	Yes	Donghae, JDUB	Yes	Donghae, JDUB	
2020	"To You, Tomorrow"	Bad Blood	Yes	Eunhyuk, Joni, ZigZag Note	No	—N/a	
2020	"What Is Your Name?"	Bad Liar	Yes	Shindong, Eunhyuk, WithRu	No	—N/a	
2021	"ZERO (Korean Version)"	Countdown	Yes	Donghae, JDUB	Yes	Donghae, JDUB, PixelWave	
2021	"Home"	Countdown	Yes	Donghae, Eunhyuk, JDUB, 1iL	Yes	Donghae, JDUB	
2024	"GGB"	606	Yes	Donghae, Virgo	Yes	Donghae, Maxx Song, Park Jisan, Virgo	
2024	"ROSE"	606	Yes	Donghae, Virgo	Yes	Donghae, Virgo	
2024	"Hang Over"	606	Yes	Donghae, Rick Bridges	No	—N/a	
2024	"Like That"	You&Me	No	—N/a	Yes	Donghae, Virgo, 17, ber.ryko, Kim Jun-tae, Lee Jae-jun	
2024	"You&Me"	You&Me	No	—N/a	Yes	Donghae, Virgo, 17, ber.ryko, Kim Jun-tae, Lee Jae-jun	
2024	"Promise"	Promise	Yes	Donghae, Zhou Mi	Yes	Donghae, Kim Jun-tae, jelly	
2024	"Bokurano Story"	Bokurano Story	Yes	Donghae, Eunhyuk	Yes	Donghae, Kim Jun-tae, Lee Jae-jun, jelly, 17	
2024	"Break"	Inevitable	Yes	Donghae, ROKSTAXIL	Yes	Donghae, ROKSTAXIL, Kim Jun-tae, 17, jelly	
2024	"Go High"	Inevitable	Yes	Donghae, ROKSTAXIL	Yes	Donghae, ROKSTAXIL	
2024	"Only You"	Inevitable	Yes	Donghae, ROKSTAXIL	Yes	Donghae, ROKSTAXIL, Arte, Louis, Fascinador, Kim Jun-tae	
2024	"Run Away"	Inevitable	Yes	Donghae, ROKSTAXIL	Yes	Donghae, ROKSTAXIL, 17, jelly	
2024	"I Try"	Inevitable (Repackage)	Yes	Donghae, ROKSTAXIL	Yes	Donghae, ROKSTAXIL, 17, jelly	
2024	"24/7 Ride"	Inevitable (Repackage)	Yes	Donghae, ROKSTAXIL	Yes	Donghae, ROKSTAXIL, Rick Bridges, Deevan, 17, jelly	

== Super Junior-L.S.S. ==
Songs written for Super Junior-L.S.S.
Year	Song	Album	Lyrics		Music		Notes
Year	Song	Album	Credited	Written	Credited	Compose	Notes
2023	"Close The Shutter"	Close The Shutter	Yes	Shindong, PrismFilter, H.Toyosaki	Yes	Shindong, HeyFarmer, NiiHwa, PrismFilter	
2023	"Ceremony"	"Ceremony"	Yes	Leeteuk, Oneway, Masaki Fujiwara	Yes	Leeteuk, Oneway	
2024	"C'mon"	"C'mon"	Yes	Leeteuk, Kinsha, Oneway	Yes	Leeteuk, Oneway	
2024	"Joke"	"Joke"	Yes	Shindong, Kim Hye-jung, Gesture, Bir$day	Yes	Shindong, Bir$day, Gesture, Lee Beom-hun	

== Super Show ==
Year	Song	Album	Artist(s)	Lyrics		Music		Notes
Year	Song	Album	Artist(s)	Credited	Written	Credited	Compose	Notes
2008	"One Love"	Super Show 1	Super Junior-K.R.Y, Eunhyuk	Yes	Eunhyuk	No	—N/a	
2009	"Carnival"	Super Show 2	Super Junior	Yes	Kangin	No	—N/a	Cover of "Carnival" by Ch!pz
2009	"Sick of Love"	Super Show 2	Henry Lau	Yes	Henry Lau	Yes	Henry Lau	
2009	"Beautiful"	Super Show 2	Donghae	Yes	Donghae, Kim Tae Sung	Yes	Donghae, Kim Tae Sung	
2009	"Heartquake"	Super Show 2	Super Junior-K.R.Y, Eunhyuk	Yes	Eunhyuk	No	—N/a	Rap written
2011	"I Wanna Love You"	Super Show 3	Donghae & Eunhyuk	No	—N/a	Yes	Donghae	
2013	"Say My Name"	Super Show 4	Eunhyuk	Yes	Eunhyuk	Yes	Henry Lau	
2015	"So Cold"	Super Show 5	Eunhyuk, Henry Lau, Donghae, Siwon	Yes	Eunhyuk	Yes	The NoizeBank (Henry Lau + his friends)	
2015	"Dear Two"	Super Show 6	Eunhyuk	Yes	Eunhyuk, MQ	No	—N/a	

== Drama OST ==
Year	Song	Album	Artist(s)	Label	Lyrics		Music	
Year	Song	Album	Artist(s)	Label	Credited	Written	Credited	Compose
2010	"Just Like Now"	It's Okay, Daddy's Girl OST Part 3	Donghae, Ryeowook	Wellmade StarM	No	—N/a	Yes	Donghae
2011	"This is Love"	Skip Beat! OST	Donghae, Henry		No	—N/a	Yes	Donghae
2012	"Promise"	Ms Panda and Mr Hedgehog OST	Kwon Soon-il	Lion Fish	Yes	Donghae	Yes	Donghae
2012	"Loving You"	Ms Panda and Mr Hedgehog OST	Super Junior-K.R.Y.	Lion Fish	No	—N/a	Yes	Donghae, D2O
2018	"It Must Be Love"	Top Management OST	Donghae	Studio 329	Yes	Donghae, Jdub	Yes	Donghae, Jdub
2023	"Cracked"	Oh! Youngsim OST	Donghae	Mo Studio	Yes	Donghae, Jdub	Yes	Donghae, Jdub

== Other ==
Songs written for other artists
Year	Song	Album	Artist(s)	Lyrics		Music	
Year	Song	Album	Artist(s)	Credited	Written	Credited	Compose
2010	"Breaka Shaka"	Breaka Shaka	Kangta	Yes	Zhoumi	No	—N/a
2010	"Remember"	Breaka Shaka	Kangta	Yes	Zhoumi	No	—N/a
2010	"Many times"	Breaka Shaka	Kangta	Yes	Zhoumi	No	—N/a
2012	"Only U"	Only U	As One ft Donghae	Yes	Donghae, Eunhyuk, Esna	Yes	Donghae
2014	"My Thoughts, Your Memories"	At Gwanghwamun	Kyuhyun	No	Changmin	Yes	Kyuhyun, Hwang Sungje
2015	"Ways to Say Goodbye"	Fall, Once Again	Kyuhyun	No	—N/a	Yes	Kyuhyun
2017	"Darling U"	Darling U - SM STATION	Yesung, Seulgi	Yes	Yesung, Eunhyuk	Yes	Yesung, Choi Heejun
2017	"Perfect (Cardillac X Donghae)"	Perfect (Cardillac X Donghae)	Donghae	Yes	Donghae, JDUB	Yes	Donghae, JDUB
2018	"Whatcha Doin'"	Whatcha Doin' - SM STATION	Yesung, Chungha	Yes	Yesung	Yes	Yesung, Ginette Claudette, Andrew Choi
2019	"Aewol-ri"	The Day We Meet Again	Kyuhyun	Yes	Kyuhyun, Hong Seokmin	Yes	Kyuhyun, Hong Seokmin
2021	"California Love"	California Love	Donghae, Jeno	Yes	Donghae, JDUB	Yes	Donghae, JDUB
2021	"Blue Moon"	California Love	Donghae, Miyeon	Yes	Donghae, Onestar (MonoTree), 1iL, JDUB	Yes	Donghae, G-High (MonoTree), Onestar (MonoTree), 1iL, JDUB
2021	"be"	be	Eunhyuk	Yes	Eunhyuk	No	—N/a
2021	"Red Muhly"	be	Eunhyuk	Yes	Eunhyuk	No	—N/a

== Logo songs ==
- Kangin's Reckless Radio - Eunhyuk, Sungmin, Donghae, Shindong, Leeteuk, Ryeowook ~ composed by Ryeowook
- Sukira (1) - Eunhyuk, Ryeowook, Leeteuk, Sungmin ~ composed by Ryeowook
- Sukira (2) - Eunhyuk, Yesung, Kyuhyun, Ryeowook ~ composed by Leeteuk + written by Eunhyuk
- Yesung's Miracle for you - Eunhyuk, Donghae, Leeteuk, Kangin, Sungmin ~ composed by Ryeowook
- Kangin & Jo Jung Rin's Chin Chin - Donghae, Ryeowook, Yesung ~ composed by Ryeowook
- Sungmin & Soo Young's Chunji - Ryeowook ~ composed by Ryeowook + written by Ryeowook
- Sungmin & Soo Young's Chunji ~ composed by Sungmin
- Kangin & Taeyeon's Chin Chin (1) - Kangin, Taeyeon ~ composed by Ryeowook
- Kangin & Taeyeon's Chin Chin (2) ~ Composed by Ryeowook
- Kangin & Taeyeon's Chin Chin (3) - Kyuhyun, Ryeowook, Yesung ~ composed by Leeteuk
- Strong Heart ~ co-composed by Donghae
- ShimShimTamPa ~ composed by Donghae

== See also ==
- List of songs written by Kim Hee-chul
- List of songs written by Lee Donghae
