= List of songs written by Lee Donghae =

Lee Dong-hae (hangul: 이동해; hanja: 李東海; born October 15, 1986) referred as Donghae, is a South Korean singer, songwriter, model and actor. He is a member of the boy band Super Junior, the subgroups Super Junior-M, and Super Junior-D&E, as well as the dance-centered group SM The Performance.

== Songs ==
Year	Artist(s)	Album	Song	Lyrics		Music	
Year	Artist(s)	Album	Song	Credited	With	Credited	With
2007	Super Junior	Don't Don	"I Am"	Yes	Leeteuk, Eunhyuk and Sungmin	No	—N/a
2009	Super Junior	Super Show 2	"Beautiful"	Yes	—N/a	Yes	—N/a
2010	Super Junior	Bonamana (repackaged)	"A Short Journey"	No	—N/a	Yes	—N/a
2010	Super Junior	Strong Heart Logo Song	"Strong Heart"	Yes	—N/a	Yes	—N/a
2010	Donghae, Ryeowook	It's Okay, Daddy's Girl OST Part 3	"Just Like Now"	Yes	—N/a	Yes	—N/a
2011	Super Junior	Mr. Simple	"Y"	Yes	Chance	Yes	Chance and Super D
2011	Super Junior-D&E	Oppa, Oppa	"First Love"	Yes	—N/a	Yes	Peter (Team OneSound)
2011	Super Junior	A-CHA	"Oops!"	Yes	Leeteuk, Heechul, Shindong, Eunhyuk, Misfit	No	—N/a
2012	Super Junior-K.R.Y.	Miss Panda and Mr. Hedgehog OST	"Loving U"	No	—N/a	Yes	D2O
2012	Super Junior	SPY	"HARU"	Yes	Kwon Sun-il	Yes	Kwon Sun-il
2012	Super Junior	SPY	"Only U"	Yes	Leeteuk	Yes	Lee Jae-myoung
2012	Donghae, Henry	Skip Beat! OST	"This is Love"	No	—N/a	Yes	Chance
2012	—N/a	Shimshimtapa Logo Song	"Shimshimtapa"	No	—N/a	Yes	—N/a
2012	As One ft Donghae	Only U	"Only U"	Yes	—N/a	Yes	—N/a
2012	Kwon Soon-il	Miss Panda and Mr. Hedgehog OST	"Promise"	Yes	—N/a	Yes	—N/a
2013	Super Junior-D&E	The Beat Goes On (Special Edition)	"Still You"	Yes	Team OneSound	Yes	Team OneSound
2014	Super Junior-D&E	The Beat Goes On (Special Edition)	"1+1=LOVE"	Yes	Team OneSound	Yes	Team OneSound
2014	Super Junior-D&E	Skeleton	"Wonderland"	Yes	—N/a	Yes	—N/a
2014	Super Junior	Mamacita	"Shirt"	Yes	Team OneSound	Yes	Team OneSound
2015	Super Junior	Devil	"Alright"	Yes	Eunhyuk and Team OneSound	Yes	Team OneSound
2015	Super Junior	Devil	"Don't Wake Me Up"	Yes	Team OneSound	Yes	Team OneSound
2015	Super Junior-D&E	The Beat Goes On	"Mother"	Yes	Team OneSound	Yes	Team OneSound
2015	Super Junior-D&E	The Beat Goes On	"Growing Pains"	Yes	Team OneSound	Yes	Team OneSound
2017	Super Junior	Play	"One More Chance"	Yes	Jdub, Eunhyuk	Yes	Jdub
2017	Donghae	Donghae x Cadillac	"Perfect"	Yes	Jdub	Yes	Jdub
2018	Super Junior-D&E	'Bout You	"'Bout You"	Yes	Jdub, Eunhyuk	Yes	Team OneSound
2018	Super Junior-D&E	'Bout You	"Victory"	Yes	Jdub	Yes	Jdub
2018	Super Junior-D&E	'Bout You	"Lost"	Yes	Jdub	Yes	Jdub
2018	Super Junior-D&E	Style	"Sunrise"	Yes	Jdub, Eunhyuk, Ume	Yes	Jdub
2018	Super Junior-D&E	Style	"If You"	Yes	Jdub, HASEGAWA	Yes	Jdub
2018	Donghae	Top Management OST	"It Must Be Love"	Yes	Jdub	Yes	Jdub
2019	Heechul	Old Movie – Single	"Old Movie"	No	Heechul	Yes	Jdub
2019	Super Junior-D&E	Danger	"Danger"	Yes	Jdub	Yes	Jdub
2019	Super Junior-D&E	Danger	"Gloomy"	Yes	Jdub	Yes	Jdub
2020	Super Junior	I Think U	"Ai ga oshiete kureta koto"	No	Natsumi Kobayashi	Yes	Jdub
2020	Super Junior	Timeless	"Rock Your Body"	Yes	Jdub	Yes	Jdub
2020	Super Junior-D&E	Bad Blood	"B.A.D"	Yes	Jdub	Yes	Jdub
2020	Donghae, Bewhy	Harmony – Digital Single	"Harmony"	Yes	Jdub, Bewhy	Yes	Jdub
2021	Donghae ft Jeno of NCT	California Love – Digital Single	"California Love"	Yes	Jdub	Yes	Jdub
2021	Donghae ft Miyeon of (G)I-dle	California Love – Digital Single	"Blue Moon"	Yes	Onestar (MonoTree), 1iL, Jdub	Yes	G-high, Onestar (MonoTree), 1iL, Jdub
2021	Super Junior-D&E	Countdown	"Zero"	Yes	Jdub	Yes	Jdub, SQUAR (PixelWave)
2021	Super Junior-D&E	Countdown	"Home"	Yes	Jdub, Eunhyuk, 1iL	Yes	Jdub
2021	Super Junior-D&E	Countdown	"Need U"	Yes	Eunhyuk, Erik Gustaf Lidbom, Adam Jonsson	No	—N/a
2023	Donghae	Oh! Youngsim OST	"Cracked"	Yes	Jdub	Yes	Jdub
2024	Super Junior-D&E	606	"GGB"	Yes	Virgo	Yes	Maxx Song, Park Jisan, Virgo
2024	Super Junior-D&E	606	"ROSE"	Yes	Virgo	Yes	Virgo
2024	Super Junior-D&E	606	"Hang Over"	Yes	Rick Bridges	No	—N/a
2024	Super Junior-D&E	You&Me	"Like That"	No	—N/a	Yes	Virgo, 17, ber.ryko, Kim Jun-tae, Lee Jae-jun
2024	Super Junior-D&E	You&Me	"You&Me"	No	—N/a	Yes	Virgo, 17, ber.ryko, Kim Jun-tae, Lee Jae-jun
2024	Super Junior-D&E	Promise	"Promise"	Yes	Zhou Mi	Yes	Kim Jun-tae, jelly
2024	Super Junior-D&E	Bokurano Story	"Bokurano Story"	Yes	Eunhyuk	Yes	Kim Jun-tae, Lee Jae-jun, jelly, 17
2024	Super Junior-D&E	Inevitable	"Break"	Yes	ROKSTAXIL	Yes	ROKSTAXIL, Kim Jun-tae, 17, jelly
2024	Super Junior-D&E	Inevitable	"Go High"	Yes	ROKSTAXIL	Yes	ROKSTAXIL
2024	Super Junior-D&E	Inevitable	"Only You"	Yes	ROKSTAXIL	Yes	ROKSTAXIL, Arte, Louis, Fascinador, Kim Jun-tae
2024	Super Junior-D&E	Inevitable	"Run Away"	Yes	ROKSTAXIL	Yes	ROKSTAXIL, 17, jelly
2024	Super Junior-D&E	Inevitable (Repackage)	"I Try"	Yes	ROKSTAXIL	Yes	ROKSTAXIL, 17, jelly
2024	Super Junior-D&E	Inevitable (Repackage)	24/7 Ride	Yes	ROKSTAXIL	Yes	ROKSTAXIL, Rick Bridges, Deevan, 17, jelly
2025	Eunhyuk	Explorer	"EMPTY"	Yes	ROKSTAXIL	Yes	ROKSTAXIL, jelly, 17
2025	Super Junior	Super Junior25	"Finale"	No	—N/a	Yes	ROKSTAXIL, jelly, 17, Ham Seung-hun, Ryan Shin
2026	Donghae	ALIVE	"EAST COAST"	Yes	1iL, Kim Jun-tae	Yes	1iL, 17, jelly, Kim Jun-tae
2026	Donghae	ALIVE	"Good Day (Feat.Park Jae-beom, 1iL)"	Yes	Park Jae-beom, 1iL	No	—N/a
2026	Donghae	ALIVE	"HAErise"	Yes	1iL	Yes	1iL
2026	Donghae	ALIVE	"RACE"	Yes	1iL	Yes	1iL
2026	Donghae	ALIVE	"HELP"	Yes	1iL	Yes	1iL, 17, jelly
2026	Donghae	ALIVE	"ROCKET"	Yes	1iL	Yes	1iL, 17, jelly
2026	Donghae	ALIVE	"Goodbye (Feat.TABLO)"	Yes	TABLO, 1iL	Yes	TABLO, 1iL, 17, jelly
2026	Donghae	ALIVE	"TOO LATE"	Yes	1iL	Yes	1iL, 17, jelly
2026	Donghae	ALIVE	"FLOWER"	Yes	1iL, Kim Jun-tae	Yes	1iL, 17, jelly, Kim Jun-tae
2026	Donghae	ALIVE	"HBD"	Yes	1iL	Yes	1iL, 17, jelly, Ryan Shin
2026	Donghae	ALIVE	"BEAUTIFUL"	Yes	1iL	Yes	1iL, 17, jelly
