= Super Junior-D&E discography =

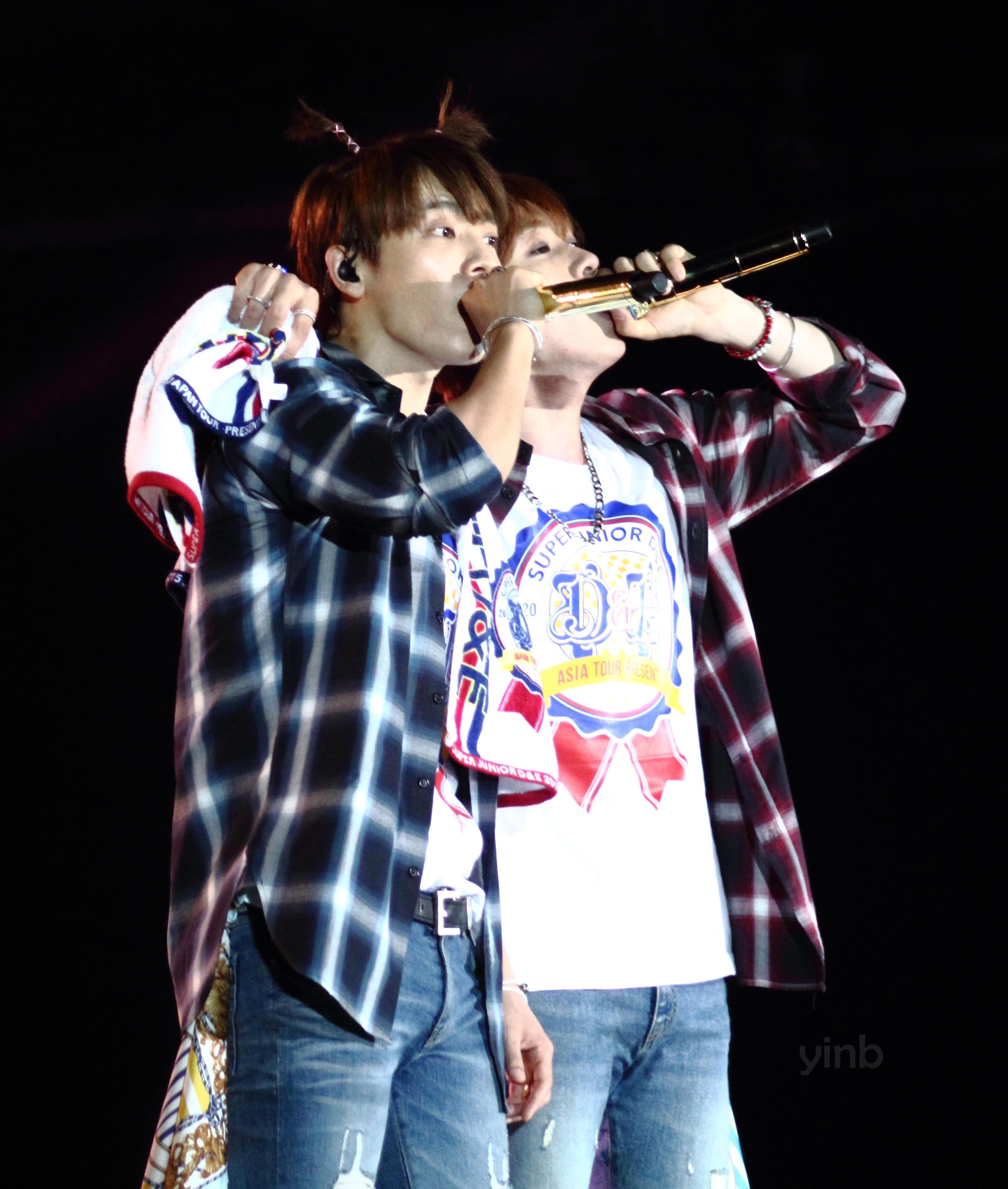
- Super Junior D&E performing in Hong Kong in 2015
- Studio albums: 3
- EPs: 8
- Singles: 21
- Music videos: 15

The discography of the South Korean boy group Super Junior the fifth sub-unit Super Junior-D&E consists of three studio albums, eight extended plays, and twenty one singles.

== Albums ==
=== Studio albums ===
List of studio albums, with selected details and chart positions
Title	Album details	Peak chart positions		Sales
Title	Album details	KOR	JPN	Sales
Ride Me	Released: February 26, 2014 (JPN); Label: Avex Trax; Formats: CD, CD+DVD	—	3	JPN: 50,152
Style	Released: August 8, 2018 (JPN); Label: Avex Trax; Formats: CD, CD+DVD	—	4	JPN: 35,478
Countdown	Released: November 2, 2021 (KOR); Label: SM Entertainment; Formats: CD, digital download	4 (Note: The Countdown version peaked at number 4, the Be version at number 5, and the California version at number 6.)	8	KOR: 233,892; JPN: 12,356
Countdown	Re-released (Countdown – Zero ver. (Epilogue)): December 10, 2021 (KOR); Label: SM Entertainment; Formats: CD, digital download	7	—	KOR: 19,694

== Extended plays ==
List of extended plays, with selected chart positions and sales
Title	EP details	Peak chart positions			Sales
Title	EP details	KOR	JPN	US World	Sales
The Beat Goes On	Released: March 9, 2015 (KOR); Label: SM Entertainment; Formats: CD, digital download	1	—	4	KOR: 107,572
The Beat Goes On	Re-released: March 24, 2015 (KOR); Label: SM Entertainment; Formats: CD, digital download	2	—	—	KOR: 107,572
Present	Released: April 1, 2015 (JPN); Label: Avex Trax; Formats: CD, CD+DVD	—	2	—	JPN: 69,142
'Bout You	Released: August 16, 2018 (KOR); Label: SM Entertainment; Formats: CD, digital download	1 (D&E Ver.); 2 (DH Ver.); 4 (EH Ver.)	—	—	KOR: 113,876; JPN: 5,179
Danger	Released: April 15, 2019 (KOR); Label: SM Entertainment; Formats: CD, digital download	2	23	—	KOR: 96,938; JPN: 2,995
Bad Blood	Released: September 3, 2020 (KOR); Re-released (Bad Liar): September 28, 2020; Label: SM Entertainment; Formats: CD, digital download, Kihno	1	12	—	KOR: 293,144; JPN: 8,124
606	Released: March 26, 2024 (KOR); Label: ODE Entertainment; Formats: CD, digital download	5	5	—	KOR: 199,882; JPN: 8,013
You&Me	Released: July 31, 2024 (JPN); Label: World Entertainment; Formats: CD, digital download	—	8	—	JPN: 12,071
Inevitable	Released: September 25, 2024; Label: ODE Entertainment; Formats: CD, digital download	5	42	—	KOR: 165,289; JPN: 822

== Singles ==
Title	Year	Peak chart positions			Sales (Note: Sales figures for tracks are based on digital downloads, except noted.)	Album
Title	Year	KOR	JPN	US World	Sales	Album
Korean
"Oppa, Oppa"	2011	13	—	—	KOR: 757,725+	The Beat Goes On (Note: Special Edition)
"Still You"	2013	51	—	—	KOR: 33,043+	The Beat Goes On
"Growing Pains"	2015	21	—	—	KOR: 45,425+	The Beat Goes On
"'Bout You"	2018	—	—	—	—N/a	'Bout You
"Danger"	2019	— (Note: Did not enter Gaon Digital Chart but peaked at number 28 on Gaon Download Chart)	—	—	—N/a	Danger
"B.A.D."	2020	129	—	—	—N/a	Bad Blood
"No Love"	2020	— (Note: Did not enter Gaon Digital Chart but peaked at number 33 on Gaon Download Chart)	—	—	—N/a	Bad Liar
"Zero"	2021	93	—	—	—N/a	Countdown
"Need U"	2021	— (Note: Did not enter Gaon Digital Chart but peaked at number 58 on Gaon Download Chart)	—	—	—N/a	Countdown - Zero ver. (Epilogue)
"GGB"	2024	187	—	—	—N/a	606
"Rose"	2024	— (Note: Did not enter Circle Digital Chart but peaked at number 118 on Circle Download Chart)	—	—	—N/a	606
"Go High"	2024	— (Note: Did not enter Circle Digital Chart but peaked at number 103 on Circle Download Chart)	—	—	—N/a	Inevitable
"Jingle Jingle"	2024	—	—	—	—N/a	Non-album singles
Japanese
"Oppa, Oppa"	2012	—	2	—	JPN: 79,183+ (Phy.)	Ride Me
"I Wanna Dance"	2013	—	3	—	JPN: 58,495+ (Phy.)	Ride Me
"Motorcycle"	2014	—	—	—	—N/a	Ride Me
"Skeleton"	2014	—	4	—	JPN: 39,314+ (Phy.)	Present
"Saturday Night"	2015	—	—	—	—N/a	Present
"Let's Get It On"	2015	—	6	—	JPN: 32,368+ (Phy.)	Star
"Here We Are"	2017	—	—	—		Style
"You don't go"	2017	—	—	—		Style
"If You"	2018	—	—	—		Style
"Circus"	2018	—	—	—		Style
"Lose It"	2018	—	—	—		Style
"Can I Stay..."	2018	—	—	—		Style
"Hot Babe"	2018	—	—	—		Style
"Sunrise"	2018	—	—	—		Style
"Wings"	2020	—	7	—		Non-album single
"Like That"	2024	—	—	—		YOU&ME
"You&Me"	2024	—	—	—		YOU&ME
"Bokurano Story"	2024	—	—	—		Non-album single
Chinese
"Promise" (with Siwon, Zhou Mi, Ryeowook, Kyuhyun)	2024	—	—	—		Non-album single

== Music videos ==
Title	Year	Director
Korean
"Oppa, Oppa"	2011	Shindong
"Still You"	2013	—N/a
"Growing Pains"	2015	Zanybros
"Chok Chok Dance"	2015	—N/a
"Bout You"	2018	37thDEGREE
"Danger"	2019	—N/a
"B.A.D"	2020	—N/a
"No Love"	2020	Gibeck Lee
"ROSE"	2024	Choi Young-ji (Pinklabel Visual)
"GGB"	2024	Choi Young-ji (Pinklabel Visual)
"Go High"	2024	Hong Jae-hwan, Lee Hye-su (SWISHER)
Japanese
"Oppa, Oppa"	2012	Zanybros
"I Wanna Dance"	2013	Zanybros
"Motorcycle"	2014	Zanybros
"Skeleton"	2014	Zanybros
"Saturday Night"	2015	Young Son, Sung-Jin Jun, Jae Hyeok Jang
"Let's Get It On"	2015	Young Son, Won Ki Hong
"Here We Are"	2017	Austin Will
"You don't go"	2017	—N/a
"If You"	2018	—N/a
"Can I Stay"	2018	—N/a
"Sunrise"	2018	Kevin Bao
"Polygraph"	2018	—N/a
"Wings"	2020	Myungbae
