= The D&E =

2019 concert tour by Super Junior-D&E

- Asia tour by Super Junior-D&E
- Concert tour promotional poster
- Associated album: Danger
- Start date: 13 April 2019
- End date: 28 August 2019
- Legs: 1
- No. of shows: 9 total
- Website: superjunior-dne.smtown.com

Super Junior-D&E concert chronology
- Super Junior-D&E Japan Tour 2018: Style (2018); The D&E (2019); DEparture (2024)

The D&E is the second Asia tour held by Super Junior's subunit Super Junior-D&E to promote their third Korean extended play album Danger, which was released two days after the start of this tour. The concerts in Seoul were the subunit's first domestic concerts in Korea.

The Seoul concerts for The D&E were first announced at the end of Super Show 7S on March 3, 2019. It was later announced on the group's official website on March 7. Tickets for the Seoul concert went on sale through YES24 on March 15 and the shows were sold out on both days.

The subunit performed 24 songs (in both Korean and Japanese) for three hours at the Seoul concert dates. They also said on stage "We have been excited and nervous to throw our first solo gig in Korea, but we enjoyed the moment on the stage thanks to your enthusiastic responses. Thank you very much and we will do our best to give good performances in the future, too."

The tour is directed by the subunit's member and leader, Eunhyuk, who also recently directed the main group Super Junior's Super Show 7 and Super Show 7S. During the press conference before the first concert in Seoul, Eunhyuk said he wanted to showcase the subunit's history and growth through their first domestic subunit concert. “I worry more for the ‘Super Show’ because I feel a lot of burden and responsibility in controlling the members. However, in the case of a D&E concert, we work out our ideas more easily. The preparation process is fast, so we had fun preparing for the concert," Eunhyuk said. Eunhyuk also stated that he tried to focus on performances and the duo's chemistry for the subunit's performances, unlike the Super Show concert series, where the members' individual charm was the focus. Donghae said that the subunit's music style differs from the main group, so fans can enjoy a variety of music styles during the concert.

Two days prior to the Seoul concert, a music video for the song "Gloomy" was released to promote the concert tour. The video was directed by Super Junior member Shindong, and the full version of the video was shown at each concert as an interlude.

== Tour dates ==
| Date | City | Country | Venue | Attendance |
|---|---|---|---|---|
| April 13, 2019 | Seoul | South Korea | Olympic Park Olympic Hall | 7,000 |
| April 14, 2019 | Seoul | South Korea | Olympic Park Olympic Hall | 7,000 |
| May 4, 2019 | Kuala Lumpur | Malaysia | Malawati Stadium | 12,000 |
| May 25, 2019 | Bangkok | Thailand | Thunder Dome | 5,000 |
| June 22, 2019 | Taipei | Taiwan | Xinzhuang Gymnasium | 10,000 |
| June 23, 2019 | Taipei | Taiwan | Xinzhuang Gymnasium | 10,000 |
| June 29, 2019 | Hong Kong | China | AsiaWorld Expo Hall 10 | 5,000 |
| August 27, 2019 | Tokyo | Japan | Makuhari Messe Event Hall | 16,000 |
| August 28, 2019 | Tokyo | Japan | Makuhari Messe Event Hall | 16,000 |

== Set list ==
- Keep Going! (Korean)
- Circus (Korean)

VCR #1

- 땡겨 (Danger) (Korean)
- Watch Out (Korean)

VCR #2

- Rum Dee Dee (Korean)
- Here We Are (Korean)

Ment

- 너는 나만큼 (Growing Pains) (Korean)
- 지독하게 (Lost) (Korean)
- Sweater & Jeans (Korean)

VCR #3

- 우울해 (Gloomy) (Korean)
- Illusion (Obsessed) (Korean)
- Hot Babe (Japanese)
- Take It Slow (Japanese)
- I Wanna Love You (Korean)

VCR #4

- Dancing Out (Korean)
- 머리부터 발끝까지 ('Bout You) (Korean)
- 여름밤 (I Love It) (Korean)
- 백야 (白夜) (Evanesce II) (Korean)

VCR #5

- Sunrise (Korean)
- Jungle (Korean)

VCR #6

- Motorcycle (Korean)
- I Wanna Dance (사네) (Korean)
- Oppa, Oppa (Korean)
- 촉이 와 (Can You Feel It?) (Korean)

Ment

- 1+1=Love (Korean)
- Hello (Korean)

Encore VCR

- The D&E (Korean)

Ment

- If You (Korean)
- Victory (Korean)

Ending

== Personnel ==
- Artist: Super Junior-D&E; Donghae and Eunhyuk
- Organizer tour: SM Entertainment, Label SJ
- Director: Eunhyuk
