= Hero (Super Junior album) =

- 2CD+DVD Version cover

Studio album by Super Junior
- Released: 24 July 2013
- Recorded: 2008–2013
- Studios: In Grid (Seoul); Supa Love (Tokyo); SM Booming System (Seoul); SM Blue Cup (Seoul); SM Concert Hall (Seoul); SM Yellow Tail (Seoul)
- Genres: J-pop; R&B; Electropop; dance; Hip hop; Eurohouse
- Length: 51:04
- Language: Japanese
- Label: Avex Trax
- Producers: Lee Soo-man; Max Matsuura

Super Junior chronology
Sexy, Free & Single (2012)	Hero (2013)	Mamacita (2014)

Singles from Hero
- 1. "Bijin (Bonamana)" Released: 8 June 2011; 2. "Mr. Simple" Released: 7 December 2011; 3. "Opera" Released: 9 May 2012; 4. "Sexy, Free & Single" Released: 22 August 2012

Hero is the debut Japanese studio album (seventh overall) of South Korean boy band Super Junior, released on 24 July 2013 under Avex Trax in Japan. The album placed first in the Oricon Daily Chart on its first day of sales.

== Background ==
After releasing a series of singles ("Bonamana", "Mr. Simple", "Opera", "Sexy, Free & Single"), the group released their first Japanese album on 24 July 2013, coinciding their Super Show 5 in Tokyo that same week. Although the singles were not considered by their management label SM Entertainment as their official Japanese promotional efforts, all the singles sold favorably. Most were within top two of the Oricon Weekly Singles Chart and three were certified Gold by the RIAJ for selling over a hundred thousand copies in Japan. Most of their Japanese releases came out to coincide with their concert in the country that week.

The album's first disc comprises thirteen tracks (with one being a bonus track). The second disc contains Japanese versions of the group's subgroup singles and its b-sides, and the DVD contains music videos, behind-the-scenes of music video making, and live performances from their recent concert in Japan, specifically from a-nation and subgroup Super Junior K.R.Y. Special Winter Concert.

== Promotion ==
Super Junior had release events in Tokyo and Osaka during August and promoted Hero during Super Show 5 at Tokyo Dome, Tokyo, 27 and 28 July, and through A-Nation. Super Junior had a meeting with E.L.F Japan official fan club members at Saitama Super Arena in September to promote the album. A day before the release, Shinjuku station was covered with Super Junior's promotional advertisements, as well Shibuya Tsutaya.

== Commercial performance ==
A month before the release, "Hero" was #3 in Tower Records pre-order charts. By 1 July, the CD-only version was sold out in E.L.F Japan store.

On 24 July 2013 the album debuted at number one in the Oricon Daily Album Chart, selling 52,232 copies on the first day. In the first week of sales "Hero" debuted at the second spot of the Oricon Weekly Albums chart with 102,224 copies, just behind rock group Ikimonogakari's "I" at the top spot by almost 10,000 copies.

== Track listing ==
=== CD ===
The version of the song Our Love is a Japanese remake of the re-arranged SS4 version of the original song off the Don't Don album. The original version of Hero, the twelfth track in this album, has vocals featuring member Yesung, while the "performance version" of the song (the bonus track) has all of Yesung's vocals replaced by other member Ryeowook, this being the one used in the music video of the song.

Hero CD1 track listing
No.	Title	Lyrics	Music	Arrangement	Length
1.	"Intro: Superman Prelude"		Yoo Young-jin	Yoo Young-jin	1:09
2.	"★BAMBINA★"	Sara Sakurai (T's Music)	Andreas Carlsson; Erik Lidbom	Erik Lidbom	4:24
3.	"Sexy, Free & Single" (Japanese version)	Leonn; Yoo Young-jin	Daniel "Obi" Klein; Thomas Sardorf; Lasse Lindorff	Daniel "Obi" Klein; Thomas Sardorf; Lasse Lindorff	3:44
4.	"Mr.Simple" (Japanese version)	Gorō Matsui; Yoo Young-jin	Yoo Young-jin	Yoo Young-jin	4:00
5.	"Opera" (Japanese version)	Masanori Nagaoka; Kenzie	Thomas Troelsen; Engelina Larsen	Kenzie	3:02
6.	"Wonder Boy" (Japanese version)	Sara Sakurai (T's Music); Groovie K; Park Joon-ha	Groovie K	Groovie K; Park Joon-ha	3:18
7.	"Our Love" (Japanese version)	Leonn; Kenzie; Yoo Jae-ha	Yoo Jae-ha	Kenzie; Yoo Jae-ha	6:11
8.	"A-Cha" (Japanese version)	Leonn; Kim Boo-min	Hitchhiker	Hitchhiker	3:19
9.	"Bonamana" (Bijin (Japanese: 美人; Japanese version))	Gorō Matsui; Yoo Young-jin	Yoo Young-jin	Yoo Young-jin	3:59
10.	"Tuxedo"	H.U.B	Joshua "J.D." Walker; Kelly Sheehan; Robert Mario	Joshua "J.D." Walker; Kelly Sheehan; Robert Mario	3:52
11.	"Way"	Hikari	Hikari	Hikari	4:47
12.	"Hero"	Natsumi Kobayashi	G'harah "PK" Degeddingseze (80hdmuzic); Jamie Jones (The Heavyweights); Jack Kugell (The Heavyweights); Jason Pennock (The Heavyweights)	The Heavyweights	4:40
13.	"Hero ― Performance Version" (Bonus track)	Natsumi Kobayashi	G'harah "PK" Degeddingseze (80hdmuzic); Jamie Jones (The Heavyweights); Jack Kugell (The Heavyweights); Jason Pennock (The Heavyweights)	The Heavyweights	4:40
Total length:					51:04

Hero CD2 track listing
No.	Title	Lyrics	Music	Arrangement	Length
1.	"I Wanna Dance" (Performed by Super Junior-D&E)	Hitchhiker (Team One Sound); Young Sky (Team One Sound); Peter Hyun (Team One Sound)	Hitchhiker (Team One Sound); Young Sky (Team One Sound); Peter Hyun (Team One Sound)	Team One Sound	3:27
2.	"Perfection" (Ōnokanbi (Japanese: 太完美; Japanese version)) (Performed by Super Junior-M)	Lee Won-geun; Huang Tsu-yin	Mikkel Remee Sigvardt; Thomas Troelsen	Mikkel Remee Sigvardt; Thomas Troelsen	3:25
3.	"Promise You" (Performed by Super Junior-K.R.Y.)	miyakei (FHR Inc.)	Daisuke Shikata; Zetton	Zetton	4:09
4.	"For Tomorrow" (明日のめに (Ashita no Tameni)) (Performed by Sungmin featuring Moeyan)	Chihiro Close	Chihiro Close	Chihiro Close	4:51
5.	"Destiny" ((Japanese: 命運線; Japanese version)) (Performed by Super Junior-M)	Liu Yuan	Kim Jin-hwan	Kim Jin-hwan	4:46
6.	"Oppa, Oppa" (Performed by Super Junior-D&E) (Japanese version)	Gorō Matsui; Young Sky (D2O); Peter Hyun (D2O)	Steven Greenberg; Young Sky (D2O); Peter Hyun (D2O)	D2O	3:17
7.	"Rock & Go" (Rokuko (ロクゴ!; Japanese version)) (Super Junior-T featuring Moeyan)	Yoon Myung-sun	Yoon Myung-sun	Yoon Myung-sun	2:59
8.	"Love That I Need" (Performed by Super Junior-D&E featuring Henry) (Japanese version)	miyakei (FHR Inc.); Super Junior-D&E	Henry (NoizeBank); Gen Neo (NoizeBank); Isaac Han (NoizeBank); Neil Nallas (NoizeBank)	NoizeBank	3:24
9.	"First Love" (Performed by Donghae) (Japanese version)	Donghae; Peter Hyun	Peter Hyun	Peter Hyun	2:06
10.	"Hana Mizuki" (Performed by Super Junior-K.R.Y.)	Yo Hitoto	Tatsuro Mashiko	Satoshi Takebe	5:05

=== DVD ===
Music Video
No.	Title	Length
1.	"Mr. Simple"
2.	"Opera"
3.	"Sexy, Free & Single"
4.	"Hero"
5.	"Oppa, Oppa"
6.	"Promise You"
7.	"I Wanna Dance"
8.	"I Wanna Dance" (Room Version)
9.	"Rokuko"
10.	"Hana Mizuki"

Making Clip
No.	Title	Length
1.	"Hero"

Live Clips [a-nation 2012 stadium fes.]
No.	Title	Length
1.	"Back Stage ～ Superman"
2.	"Mr. Simple"
3.	"Sorry, Sorry"
4.	"Sexy, Free & Single"

Live Clips [Super Junior-K.R.Y. Special Winter Concert @Kobe World Hall]
No.	Title	Length
1.	"Sorry Sorry Answer"
2.	"From U"
3.	"Hana Mizuki"
4.	"Loving You"

== Release history ==
Release history for Hero
Country	Date	Format(s)	Label	Edition(s)	Ref
Japan	24 July 2013	CD	Avex Trax	CD-only	
Japan	24 July 2013	CD; DVD	Avex Trax	2CD+DVD	
Japan	24 July 2013	CD; DVD	Avex Trax	E.L.F JAPAN version	
Various	24 July 2013	Digital download; streaming	Avex Trax	Digital version	
South Korea	14 August 2013	Digital download; streaming	Avex Trax; SM	Korean version	

== Chart ==
=== Oricon ===
Oricon Chart	Peak	Debut Sales	Sales Total	Ref
Daily Albums Chart	1	52,232	122,373+	
Weekly Albums Chart	2	102,224	122,373+	
Monthly Albums Chart	7	111,085	122,373+	
Yearly Albums Chart	49	122,373	122,373+	

=== Sales and certifications ===
Chart	Amount
Oricon physical sales	122,373+
RIAJ physical shipping certification	Gold
