= Super Junior D&E The 1st Asia Tour =

2015 concert tour by Super Junior-D&E

Super Junior D&E Asia Tour 2015 -Present-
- Asia tour by Super Junior-D&E
- Associated album: The Beat Goes On
- Start date: 6 June 2015
- End date: 12 August 2015
- Legs: 4
- No. of shows: 2 in Taiwan; 1 in Hong Kong; 1 in China; 1 in Thailand; 5 in total
- Website: superjunior-dne.smtown.com

Super Junior-D&E concert chronology
- Super Junior D&E Japan Tour 2015 -Present- (2015); Super Junior D&E Asia Tour 2015 -Present- (2015); Super Junior-D&E Japan Tour 2018 ~Style~ (2018)

Super Junior D&E Asia Tour 2015 -Present- is the first Asia tour held by Super Junior-D&E to promote their first Korean extended play The Beat Goes On that was released last March under SM Entertainment. Kicks off in Taipei on June 6, going through 4 Asia cities including Taipei, Hong Kong, Shanghai and Bangkok for 5 performances.

== Set list ==
Opening VCR

- Scary House
- Motorcycle
- Bari 5!

Ment

- Lights, Camera, Action!
- The Beat Goes On
- Skeleton

VCR #2

- 超Pressure
- Wonderland (Donghae solo)
- Say My Name (Eunhyuk solo)
- Way For Love
- Growing Pains

VCR #3

- Mother
- Love That I Need

Ment

- Still You
- Sweater & Jeans
- Breaking Up

VCR #4

- W I N E
- Full of Happiness
- I Wanna Dance (사네)
- Oppa, Oppa
- Saturday Night

Encore VCR

- Kiss Kiss Dynamite
- Can You Feel It?

Ment

- Hello
Ending

== Tour dates ==
Dates	City	Country	Avenue
June 6, 2015	Taipei	Taiwan	Baru-Central Gymnasium
June 7, 2015	Taipei	Taiwan	Baru-Central Gymnasium
June 20, 2015	Hong Kong	China	Asia World Arena
June 27, 2015	Shanghai	China	Shanghai Grand Stage
August 12, 2015	Bangkok	Thailand	Royal Paragon Hall

== Personnel ==
- Artist: Super Junior-D&E; Donghae and Eunhyuk
- Organizer tour: SM Entertainment
- Promotor tour: Dream Maker
