= Super Junior D&E The 2nd Japan Tour =

2015 concert tour by Super Junior-D&E

Super Junior D&E Japan Tour 2015 -Present-
- Japan tour by Super Junior-D&E
- Cover album for Super Junior-D&E Japan Tour 2015 -Present-
- Associated album: Present
- Start date: April 3, 2015
- End date: April 23, 2015
- Legs: 4
- No. of shows: 10

Super Junior-D&E concert chronology
- Super Junior D&E The 1st Japan Tour (2013–14); Super Junior D&E Japan Tour 2015 -Present- (2015); Super Junior D&E Asia Tour 2015 -Present- (2015)

Super Junior D&E Japan Tour 2015 -Present- is the second Japan Arena tour held by Super Junior-D&E. Commenced in Saitama continued to Osaka, Nagoya and Fukuoka with 10 shows in total and attracted over 100.000 fans. They performed 24 songs within 3 hours.

== Summary ==
On December 20, 2014 during Super Junior's Super Show 6 in Fukuoka it's announced that their subgroup, Super Junior-D&E will hold their 2nd Japan tour. On January 13, 2015, Super Junior Japan official website confirmed this news by releasing further information about the tour. It planned for 9 shows but then the organizer added 1 more show in Fukuoka. This show end successfully and attracted about 100.000 fans.

== Tour dates ==
Dates	City	Venue	Attendances
April 3, 2015	Saitama	Saitama Super Arena	45,000
April 4, 2015	Saitama	Saitama Super Arena	45,000
April 5, 2015	Saitama	Saitama Super Arena	45,000
April 9, 2015	Osaka	Osaka-Jo Hall	48,000
April 10, 2015	Osaka	Osaka-Jo Hall	48,000
April 11, 2015	Osaka	Osaka-Jo Hall	48,000
April 18, 2015	Nagoya	Nippon Galshi Hall Nagoya	20,000
April 19, 2015	Nagoya	Nippon Galshi Hall Nagoya	20,000
April 22, 2015	Fukuoka	Marine Messe Fukuoka	20,000
April 23, 2015	Fukuoka	Marine Messe Fukuoka	20,000

== Discography ==
Format	DVD Album
DVD	Super Junior D&E The 2nd Japan Tour 2015: Present - DVD/Blu-ray; Release: October 28, 2015; Version: DVD Normal Edition; DVD First Press Limited Edition; Blu-ray First Press Limited Edition

== Special features ==
- On April 18 – 22 2015 this tour aired live at SMTown@coexartium SMTown Theatre Surround Viewing.

== Personnel ==
- Artis: Super Junior-D&E; Donghae and Eunhyuk
- Organizer tour: SM Entertainment
- Promoter tour: Dream Maker
