= Growing Pains (Super Junior-D&E song) =

Single by Super Junior-D&E

from the EP The Beat Goes On
- Language: Korean; Japanese
- Released: March 5, 2015
- Recorded: 2015
- Studio: In Grid (Seoul); Lead (Seoul); SM Blue Ocean (Seoul)
- Genre: Pop rock
- Length: 3:21
- Label: SM; KT
- Composers: Lee Dong-hae; Team One Sound
- Lyricists: Lee Dong-hae; Team One Sound; Sara Sakurai (JP)
- Producers: Lee Dong-hae; Team One Sound

Super Junior-D&E singles chronology
"Skeleton" (2014)	"Growing Pains" (2015)	"Let's Get It On" (2015)

Music video
- "Growing Pains" on YouTube

"Growing Pains" (Korean: 너는 나만큼; RR: Neoneun namankeum; lit. 'You are as much as me') is a song recorded by South Korean duo Super Junior-D&E as the lead single from their first Korean EP, The Beat Goes On. It was released on March 5, 2015, by SM Entertainment and distributed by KT Music.

== Background ==
In 2014, Super Junior-D&E released their first Japanese studio album, Ride Me on March 12. They regrouped with the larger Super Junior-M subgroup for their third EP, Swing nine days later. In August, the duo had a Super Junior comeback through the release of Mamacita.

On February 25, 2015, SM Entertainment announced that the duo will have a comeback in March and added that they have finished recording and filming the music video. In the following day, the duo confirmed that they have been formed as Super Junior-D&E, as a new Super Junior subgroup, and the EP's name was revealed as The Beat Goes On, scheduled to be released on March 6.

"Growing Pains" was announced as the lead single of the EP on March 2 via a teaser video on SM Town's YouTube channel and their website. Another teaser video was uploaded the following day. The song and its music video were released on March 5.

== Composition ==
"Growing Pains" is categorized as a medium-tempo pop-rock song. It was composed by Donghae and Team One Sound, with a combination of electric and acoustic guitar, and piano melodies.

The lyrics were penned by Donghae and Team One Sound, expressing the sad feeling after a breakup.

The Japanese version of the song was penned by Sara Sakurai, and it was included in the duo's second Japanese EP, Present, which was released on April 1.

== Promotions ==
The duo performed the song during their showcase on March 5. They made an appearance at the following day's Music Bank. The duo then performed the song alongside the other song from the EP, "The Beat Goes On" during their March 7 appearance at Show! Music Core. During their Inkigayo appearance on March 8, Eunhyuk slipped during the choreography, but managed to finish the performance without further problems.

In 2019, the song was featured on the setlist of The D&E, the duo's second Asia tour. Later in July, the duo performed the song during the main group's first solo concert in Jeddah, Saudi Arabia as part of the Jeddah Season festival.

== Charts ==
Chart (2015)	Peak position
South Korea (Gaon)	21

== Credits ==
Credits adapted from both EP's liner notes.

Studio

- In Grid Studio − recording, digital editing
- Lead Sound − recording
- SM Blue Ocean Studio − recording
- SM Yellow Tail Studio − mixing
- Sterling Sound − mastering

Personnel

- SM Entertainment − executive producer
- Lee Soo-man − producer
- Super Junior-D&E − vocals
  - Lee Dong-hae − lyrics
- Team One Sound − producer, lyrics, composition, arrangement
  - Peter − background vocals, vocal direction
- Sara Sakurai − Japanese lyrics
- Jung Eun-kyung − recording
- Gu Jong-pil − mixing
- Tom Coyne − mastering

== Release history ==
Release history for "Growing Pains"
Region	Date	Version	Format	Label
South Korea	March 5, 2015	Korean	Digital download; streaming	SM; KT
Various	March 5, 2015	Korean	Digital download; streaming	SM
Japan	April 1, 2015	Japanese	Digital download; streaming	Avex Trax
Various	April 1, 2015	Japanese	Digital download; streaming	Avex Trax
