= Present (Super Junior-D&E EP) =

- CD+DVD Version cover

EP by Super Junior-D&E
- Released: April 1, 2015
- Studio: In Grid (Seoul); SM Blue Ocean (Seoul); SM Yellow Tail (Seoul)
- Genre: R&B; Electro house
- Length: 26:23
- Language: Japanese
- Label: Avex Trax

Super Junior-D&E chronology
The Beat Goes On (2015)	Present (2015)	Style (2018)

Singles from Present
- 1. "Skeleton" Released: 6 August 2014

Present is the second extended play (EP) of South Korean pop duo Super Junior-D&E, a subgroup of the boy band Super Junior. The EP was released on April 1, 2015 under Avex Trax in Japan.

== Track listing ==
CD1

CD
No.	Title	Lyrics	Music	Length
1.	"Saturday Night"	S-key-A	Henrik Nordenback, Christian Fast, Fernando Fuentes	3:26
2.	"Skeleton"	Shimura ushiro, Carlos Water Paco	Will Simms, Hayley Aitken, Iggy Strange-Dahl	3:24
3.	"Wine"	AKIRA	DWB, Will Simms	3:19
4.	"Wonderland"	AKIRA, Team One Sound	Lee Donghae, Team One Sound	4:05
5.	"Scary House"	AKIRA	Martin Hoberg Hedegaard, Fridolin Nordsoe Schjoldan, Frederik Tao Schjoldan, Simo Pirhonen, Snorre Forsgren, Henri Jouni Kristian Lanz, William Robert Rappaport, Roderick Kerr	3:48
6.	"Where Is She?"	Natsumi Kobayashi	Steve Mac, Claude Kelly	3:08
7.	"Growing Pains"	Sara Sakurai	Lee Donghae, Team One Sound	3:22
8.	"GIFT"	Sara Sakurai	SKY BEATZ, FAST LANE, Andrew Choi & 220	3:52
9.	"超プレッシャー (Super Pressure)" (CD Only Version Bonus Track)	SHIROSE	Command Freaks, Casper	3:27
10.	"Symphony" (E.L.F-JAPAN Version Bonus Track)	Sara Sakurai	James Winchester, Peter Boyes, Christopher Wortley	3:29
Total length:				26:23

DVD

- "Saturday Night" Music Video
- "Skeleton" Music Video
- "Saturday Night" Music Video Making Clip
- "Present" JK Making Clip

== Chart ==
Oricon Singles Chart, Japan
Chart	Period	Peak position	Reported sales
Weekly Album Chart	30 March - 5 April 2015	2	

== Awards ==
Year	Award	Category	Nominated work	Result	Ref.
2015	30th Japan Gold Disc Award | Album of the Year	Present	Won		
2015	30th Japan Gold Disc Award | Album of the Year	Present	Best 3 Album	Won	

== Release history ==
Release history for Present
Region	Date	Format	Label	Ref
Japan	April 1, 2015	CD; DVD	Avex Trax	
Various	April 1, 2015	Digital download; streaming	Avex Trax	—
