= Danger (EP) =

- Digital cover

EP by Super Junior-D&E
- Released: April 15, 2019
- Recorded: 2019
- Studios: Doobdoob (Seoul); In Grid (Seoul); SM Blue Cup (Seoul); SM Concert Hall (Seoul); SM LVYN (Seoul); SM Yellow Tail (Seoul); Sound Pool (Seoul)
- Genres: EDM trap; hip hop; R&B
- Length: 24:24
- Language: Korean
- Labels: SM; Label SJ; Dreamus
- Producers: Tak Young-jun; J-DUB; Jake K; Michael Polk; Luigie Gonzalez; Adam Kapit; Tha Aristocrats

Super Junior-D&E chronology
'Bout You (2018)	Danger (2019)	Bad Blood (2020)

Singles from Danger
- 1. "Danger" Released: April 15, 2019

Music video
- "Danger" on YouTube
- "Danger (Performance Ver.)" on YouTube

Danger is the third Korean EP by South Korean duo Super Junior-D&E, a sub-unit of the boy band Super Junior. The album was released on April 15, 2019, by SM Entertainment and Label SJ, and distributed by Dreamus. The album consists of seven tracks including the lead single of the same name and two previously released songs from their second Japanese full-length album that were re-recorded into Korean from Japanese.

== Background ==
On April 2, 2019, Label SJ released an image teaser and announced that Super Junior-D&E will have a Korean comeback on April 15, following their previous release last August with 'Bout You. Unlike their previous their usual colorful teaser photos, this time the label shows the members in a black-and-white photo, exuding a mysterious aura. In the same post, the label outlined the comeback schedule leading up to the album's offline release on April 15. During Donghae's teaser photo release on April 3, the label announced that the EP will come in two versions — "Red", and "Black", and two songs from their second full-length Japanese album, Style are going to be included in this release in their re-recorded Korean version due to their positive reception during their initial release. On April 4, teaser photos of Eunhyuk was released. On April 10, the highlight medley of the EP was uploaded on YouTube.

Before the album's release, the duo held their first solo concert in Olympic Hall, Seoul from April 13–14, marking their domestic concerts in South Korea.

On April 14, the music video for the lead single, "Danger" was released alongside the digital EP, followed by the physical copy of the EP the following day.

== Composition ==
The EP consists of seven tracks consisting of various genres ranging from trap, hip hop, nu-disco, and R&B. The band stated that they wanted to show their masculine side and be real men. Speaking of the album's black and red colors, Eunhyuk states that the former symbolizes charisma, while the latter is "sexiness." Donghae recounted the inspiration to write the EP came from horse racing, and invites the fans to run alongside them without looking sideways.

The opening track, "Danger" is an electro house song with trap influences to bring out the charismatic personalities of the members. Penned by Donghae and J-DUB, the song featured dark sounds with minor chord progression with its lyrics playfully likening the expression of "ding" as "danger." "Jungle" is a trap song with strong synthesizer sound, reminiscent to a jungle. The lyrics were written as a first-person who sees everything.

"Gloomy" is an R&B song with an 808 bass sound and a somber electric guitar melody to amplify the song's emotions. Its melancholic lyrics were penned by Donghae. The music video for the track was released on April 12, two days before their Seoul concert, and it was directed by their bandmate Shindong. "Watch Out" is a pop song with a groovy rhythm with its lyrics warning the listeners during one that fell in love with someone dangerous. "Dreamer" is a pop ballad song with mellow melody and a dynamic burst of sound in its chorus. The lyrics sympthasizes with someone suffering from anxiety. The track was written by Tha Aristocrats, the production team behind labelmate Exo's "Overdose."

The EP concludes with the Korean versions of "Sunrise" and "If You", the tracks that were previously released in Japanese.

== Promotion ==
The duo embarked on their second Asia tour, "The D&E", to promote the EP from April 13–August 28, visiting five countries, South Korea, Malaysia, Thailand, Taiwan, Hong Kong, and Japan. Its Seoul stops were held two days before the release of the EP, in which the duo performed several tracks of the EP — "Danger", "Watch Out", "Gloomy", and "Jungle", for the first time.

They performed "Watch Out" and "Danger" on Music Bank on April 19, followed by a return performance a week later on April 26 for the latter track. The duo performed "Gloomy" on MBC's Music Core on April 20.

== Track listing ==
Danger track listing
No.	Title	Lyrics	Music	Arrangement	Length
1.	"Danger" (땡겨; Ttaenggyeo; 'Pull')	Lee Dong-hae; J-DUB	Lee Dong-hae; J-DUB	J-DUB	3:14
2.	"Jungle"	Lee Seu-ran; Rick Bridges	Varien; Andreas Öberg; Sqvare; Jake K	Jake K	3:30
3.	"Gloomy" (우울해; Uulhae; 'I'm blue')	Lee Dong-hae; J-DUB	Lee Dong-hae; J-DUB	J-DUB	3:20
4.	"Watch Out"	Hwang Yoo-bin; Rick Bridges	Michael Polk; Luigie González; Keaton Stromberg; Spencer Sutherland; Tyler Shamy; Tova	Michael Polk; Luigie Gonzalez; Adam Kapit	3:16
5.	"Dreamer"	Ji Ye-won (153/Joombas); Lee Hyuk-jae	Tha Aristocrats; Taesung Kim; Zac Poor	Tha Aristocrats	3:21
6.	"Sunrise" (Korean version)	Lee Dong-hae; Lee Hyuk-jae; J-DUB	Lee Dong-hae; J-DUB	J-DUB	3:33
7.	"If You" (Korean version)	Lee Dong-hae; J-DUB	Lee Dong-hae; J-DUB	J-DUB	3:34
Total length:					24:24

== Sales ==
According to Gaon Chart, the EP debuted in 97th with over 1,100 sold copies in South Korea.

== Charts ==
Chart performance for Danger
Chart (2019)	Peak position
Japanese Albums (Oricon)	23
South Korean Albums (Gaon)	2

== Release history ==
Release history for Danger
Region	Date	Format	Label
Various	April 14, 2019	Digital download; streaming	SM; Label SJ
South Korea	April 15, 2019	CD	SM; Label SJ; Dreamus
