= Zetton =

Japanese hiphop record producer

- Born: 1980 (age 45–46)
- Origin: Japan
- Genres: Hip hop
- Occupation: Record Producer
- Instruments: Turntables, MPC3000, Synthesizer, Keyboard, Sampler, Drummachine
- Years active: 1996–present
- Labels: Nichion, INside-Muzic
- Website: Nichion Website、INSIDE-MUZIC Website

Zetton (ゼットン), stylized "ZETTON", is a Japanese hiphop record producer who emerged in 1996 from the underground hip hop scene in Fukuoka, Japan. Zetton is also the chief executive officer of Inside Muzic and Studio Lb12.

He is known for producing Rowshi and Brown Sugar, who made a lot of hit records. His production can also be found on major artists such as Nitro Microphone Underground, HI-D, Juju, Kana Nishino, Miliyah Iliyah Kato, Super-Junior-K.R.Y, Exile Atsushi, Generations, and Sandaime J Soul Brothers from Exile Tribe.

== Biography ==
- 1996 started his career as "Zetton"
- 2004 built his own studio "Studio Lb12"
- 2007 established Takaki Shoten/Inside-Muzic with Rowshi
- 2016 He release his new instrumental album "Beatz Hustler"
- 2016 "R.O.B" 7th instrumental album has out without announcement

== Discography ==
=== CD (5 titles) ===
- 『The Beat maker』
  - Remix CD off of M.O.P, Talib Kweli, Anthony Hamilton, Game, Common
    - 『The Beat maker 001』(2006)
    - 『The Beat maker -R&B remix- 002』(2006)
    - 『The Beat maker - 3Maeme Remix - 003』(2006)
    - 『The Beat maker 004』(2006)
    - 『da beat breaker 005』(2007)
- 『Beatz Hustler』(2016)
- 『R.O.B』(2016)

=== LP Record (4 titles) ===
- 『Mo Better EP』
  - Remix (12 inch vinyl) off of The Beatnuts, Pharcyde, Kool G Rap, Nas sold at Juno Record in UK
    - 『Mo Better EP 001』Zetton (2007)
    - 『Mo Better EP 002』Common Remixes (2007)
    - 『Mo Better EP 003』Zetton x Bach Logic (2008)
    - 『Mo Better EP 004』Zetton x Smith (2008)

== Single and album produced ==
Year	Artist	Title	Producer(s)	Writer(s)
2005	Rowshi-籠獅-	Album『Arashishi』	Zetton	Rowshi-籠獅-
2005	Bigiz' Mafia	調子上々	Zetton	Bigiz' MAFIA
2005	Bigiz' Mafia	宝	Zetton	Bigiz' Mafia
2006	Rowshi-籠獅-	Album『Dou-Dell』	Zetton	Rowhsi-籠獅-
2007	Brown Sugar	Album『Lovibe』	Zetton	Brown Sugar
2007	HI-D	Neva Giva	Zetton	Hi-D
2007	Nitro Microphone Underground	Bomber Man	Zetton	Nitro Microphone Underground
2008	Rowshi-籠獅-	Album『Pride』	Zetton	Rowshi-籠獅-
2008	Brown Sugar	Album『L.E.D』	Zetton	Brown Sugar
2008	Hi-D	Specialist	Zetton	Hi-D
2008	Bigiz' Mafia	Rock Da Mic	Zetton	Bigiz' Mafia
2008	Bigiz' Mafia	Ghetto Radio	Zetton	Bigiz' Mafia
2008	Bigiz' Mafia	Feel My Soul feat Mamushi MC's	Zetton	Bigiz' Mafia・Mamushi MC's
2008	Bigiz' Mafia	Requiem feat Shintai	Zetton	Bigiz' Mafia・Shintai
2009	Brown Sugar	Album『Destiny』	Zetton	Brown Sugar
2010	Rowshi-籠獅-	Album『SA - KE - BE』	Zetton	Rowshi-籠獅-
2010	Brown Sugar	Album『ballad』	Zetton	Brown Sugar
2010	福原美穂	Rising Like a Flame	Zetton	Zetton・Dee Adam・ISSA
2010	Juju	feel me, feel me	Zetton	Juju
2010	加藤ミリヤ	Free	Zetton	Miliyah
2010	西野カナ	You are the one	Zetton	Kana Nishino
2010	Rimie	My Way feat. Rowshi	Zetton	Rimie・Rowshi
2010	RSP	End Of Loop	Zetton・Marcus Dernulf	Kana Yabuki
2010	w-inds.	Fighting For Love	Zetton・Carl Sahlin・Erik Lidbom	shungo.
2011	Rowshi-籠獅-	Album『Affection & Hate』	Zetton	Rowshi-籠獅-
2011	Brown Sugar	Album『Inspire』	Zetton	Brown Sugar
2011	Big Ron	King of Hook feat. 籠獅	Zetton	Big Ron
2011	Da Pump	Can't get your love	Zetton	谷村奈南
2011	Da Pump	Let me get you now	Zetton	谷村奈南・Issa
2011	HI-D	Fantasy & Privacy	Zetton	Hi-D
2011	加藤ミリヤ	Roman	Zetton	Miliyah
2011	黒木メイサ	Go Ahead	Zetton・Darren Martyn	Yuhki Shirai
2011	真崎ゆか	Get Away	Zetton・Darren Martyn	Yuhki Shirai
2011	真崎ゆか	Summer Rain	Zetton・Fast Lane (Sonista)	Yuka Masaki
2011	w-inds.	Humanizer	Zetton・Fast Lane	shungo.
2011	w-inds.	Be As One	Zetton・Shikata・Mats Lie Skare	Natsumi Watanabe
2011	w-inds.	Rainbow Hill	Zetton・Fast Lane	Natsumi Watanabe
2011	w-inds.	Nothing Gonna Change It	Zetton・Fast Lane・Mats Lie Skare	Natsumi Watanabe
2011	w-inds.	Tribute	Zetton・Carl Sahlin・Erik Lidbom	shungo.
2011	w-inds.	You & I	Jack Rabbitz・Zetton	Jack Rabbitz
2011	w-inds.	Chillin' in the Daydream	Jack Rabbitz・Zetton	Jack Rabbitz
2012	Rowshi-籠獅-	Album『The Own Life』	Zetton	Rowshi-籠獅-
2012	Brown Sugar	Album『Ring Ring』	Zetton	Brown Sugar
2012	福原美穂	Open Eyes	Zetton・Fast Lane; Joveek Murphy・Momo"mocha"N.	Zetton・Fast Lane; Joveek Murphy・Momo"mocha"N.
2012	加藤ミリヤ	All I Want Is You	Zetton	Miliyah
2013	Rowshi-籠獅-	Album『Brother』	Zetton・Mathematics	Rowshi-籠獅-
2013	Brown Sugar	Album『Delight』	Zetton・Mathematics	Brown Sugar
2013	P.O.C.K.Y	Album『Blaze End』	Zetton・Mathematics	P.O.C.K.Y
2013	Big Ron	Survivor feat. Rowshi	Zetton	Big Ron・Rowshi
2013	Generations from Exile Tribe	Go On	Zetton・Fast Lane・Chris Hope・J Faith	Maria Okada
2013	Generations from Exile Tribe	Fallin'	Zetton・Fast Lane・Chris Hope・J Faith	Maria Okada
2013	平原綾香	You and I ...	Zetton・Fast Lane・Mats Lie Skare	Ayaka Hirahara
2013	Super Junior-K.R.Y.	Promise You	Zetton・Shikata・Mats Lie Skare	miyakei
2013	TOC	Birthday	TOC・Zetton	TOC
2014	安室奈美恵	Tsuki	Zetton・Fast Lane・Lisa Desmond	Tiger
2014	Super Junior-Donghae & Eunhyuk	君が泣いたら	Zetton・Darren Martyn・Shirose	Shirose
2014	Kazu	Album『Transform』	Zetton	Kazu
2014	Exile Atsushi	First Christmas	Zetton・Fast Lane・Chris Hope・J Faith	Atsushi・Doberman Infinity
2015	Generations from Exile Tribe	Sing it Loud	Zetton・Fast Lane・Chris Hoope・J Faith	Amon Hayashi
2015	三代目 J Soul Brothers from Exile Tribe	Storm Riders feat. Slash	Zetton・Shikata・Chris Hope	Takanori (LL Brothers)・Ally
