= SM The Performance =

2012–2013 South Korean dance group

- Origin: Seoul, South Korea
- Genres: Electro house; Dubstep
- Years active: 2012–2013
- Labels: SM
- Spinoffs: SM Town
- Members: U-Know; Eunhyuk; Donghae; Taemin; Minho; Kai; Lay

SM The Performance is a special dance project group formed by SM Entertainment in 2012. The group made their first appearance on SBS Gayo Daejeon in December 2012. The group consists of members of other groups of SM, the first formation being composed of U-Know (TVXQ), Eunhyuk (Super Junior), Donghae (Super Junior), Taemin (SHINee), Minho (SHINee), Kai (EXO) and Lay (EXO).

== History ==
The group made their first appearance on SBS Gayo Daejeon on December 29, 2012, featuring a dance number with the song "Spectrum" in collaboration with Zedd and performed by U-Know (TVXQ), Eunhyuk and Donghae (Super Junior), Taemin and Minho (SHINee), and Kai and Lay (EXO). The choreography was created by Tabitha and Napoleon D'umo, who have collaborated with Christina Aguilera, BoA in "Only One" and TVXQ in "Humanoids". The song was released as digital single the next day, debuting at #43 on the Gaon Digital Chart. The group performed at the SM Town Live World Tour III in Tokyo Special Edition between October 26 and 27, 2013.

== Discography ==
Title	Year	Peak chart positions		Sales	Album
Title	Year	KOR Gaon	US World	Sales	Album
"Spectrum" (with Zedd)	2012	43	—	KOR (DL): 58,298	Non-album releases
"Dream In A Dream" (夢中夢 / 몽중몽)	2017	—	5	US: 1,000	Non-album releases
