= 'Bout You =

- Digital cover

EP by Super Junior-D&E
- Released: August 16, 2018
- Recorded: 2017–18
- Studio: Doobdoob (Seoul); SM Big Shot (Seoul); SM Blue Cup (Seoul); SM Blue Ocean (Seoul); SM Concert Hall (Seoul); SM Yellow Tail (Seoul)
- Genre: Trap; hip hop; house; R&B
- Length: 27:21
- Language: Korean
- Label: SM; Label SJ; iRiver
- Producer: Tak Young-jun

Super Junior-D&E chronology
Style (2018)	'Bout You (2018)	Danger (2019)

Singles from 'Bout You
- 1. "'Bout You" Released: August 16, 2018

Music video
- "'Bout You" on YouTube

'Bout You is the second Korean extended play (EP) by South Korean duo Super Junior-D&E, a sub-unit of the boy band Super Junior. The album was released on August 16, 2018, by SM Entertainment and Label SJ. This is their second Korean comeback since The Beat Goes On in 2015.

== Background ==
On August 1, 2018, the duo announced that they were making their Korean comeback. The music video for the titular single track was taped in New York City during Super Junior's 2018 KCON performance in the nearby Newark, New Jersey.

During an interview with The Korea Herald, Donghae stated that the album was originally planned to be released in winter, but it was then decided to be released in August citing the duo's desire to meet the fans as soon as possible.

== Composition ==
Unlike most Super Junior songs, those on 'Bout You are primarily influenced by trap, hip hop, house and R&B.

"'Bout You" the title track of the album is written by both members; the song is categorized as a trap hip-hop song. The lyrics describe a man who fell in love at first sight. Donghae also stated that his friendship with Eunhyuk was the source of inspiration behind the song.

== Live performances ==
The single was performed live for the first time on August 17 with an appearance in Music Bank, with bandmates Ryeowook and Siwon also in the attendance.

== Commercial performance ==
The album debuted at number one on the Circle Album Chart, with three of its versions charting in the top five in its first week.

== Track listing ==
'Bout You track listing
No.	Title	Lyrics	Music	Arrangement	Length
1.	"'Bout You" (머리부터 발끝까지; Meoributeo balkkeutkkaji; 'From Head to Toe')	Donghae; J-Dub; Eunhyuk	Donghae; J-Dub	J-Dub	3:27
2.	"Rum Dee Dee"	Hong Soo-ji (153Joombas); Kim Soo-yeon (Jam Factory; Kyung Jin-hee (Jam Factory)	Patrick Hartman; Nico Stadi; Jamil "Digi" Chammas; MZMC	Nico Stadi	2:56
3.	"I Love It" (여름밤; Yeoreumbam; 'Summer night')	Cho Yuri (Jam Factory); Kim Bo-eun (Jam Factory)	Kyler Niko; Pete Kirkley; Oliver Leonard	Pete Kirkley; Oliver Leonard	3:34
4.	"Livin' In"	Seoro (Jam Factory); Kim In-hyung (Jam Factory)	Cory Nitta; Jay Sean; Daniel Beddingfield; Dan Farber; MZMC	Cory Enemy	3:35
5.	"Evanesce II" (백야; 白夜; Baegya; 'White night')	Jo Yoon-kyung; Jang Yeo-jin (lalala studio)	Maxx Song; Woodz; Jabong	Jabong; Maxx Song	3:29
6.	"Lost" (지독하게; Jidokhage; 'Severely') (performed by Donghae))	Donghae; J-Dub	Donghae; J-Dub	J-Dub	3:13
7.	"Illusion (Obsessed)" (performed by Eunhyuk)	Eunhyuk	Jake K (FullBloom); Andreas Öberg; Chris Wahle; Eunhyuk	Jake K (FullBloom)	3:19
8.	"Victory" (special track)	Donghae; J-Dub	Donghae; J-Dub	J-Dub	3:48
Total length:					27:21

== Charts ==
Chart performance for 'Bout You
Chart (2018)	Peak position
South Korean Albums (Circle)	1

== Release history ==
Release history for 'Bout You
Region	Date	Format	Label	Ref
South Korea	August 15, 2018	CD	SM; Label SJ; iRiver	
Various	August 16, 2018	Digital download; streaming	SM; Label SJ	

== See also ==
- Super Junior-D&E discography
