= Ride Me (album) =

- Ride Me, CD+DVD album cover

Studio album by Donghae & Eunhyuk
- Released: February 26, 2014
- Recorded: 2012–2014
- Genre: J-pop; Retro-disco; Synthpop
- Language: Japanese
- Label: Avex Trax

Donghae & Eunhyuk chronology
Ride Me (2014)	The Beat Goes On (2015)

Singles from Ride Me
- 1. "Oppa, Oppa" Released: April 4, 2012; 2. "I Wanna Dance" Released: June 19, 2013; 3. "Motorcycle" Released: February 26, 2014

Ride Me is the first Japanese studio album of South Korean pop duo Donghae & Eunhyuk, a subgroup of the boy band Super Junior. The album was released on February 26, 2014 under Avex Trax in Japan.

== Background ==
Donghae & Eunhyuk revealed during Super Show 5 in Osaka that they would release their first album, followed by their first tour, in Japan. Their first album, Ride Me was released on February 26, 2014. "Motorcycle" was the lead single of the album. The short version music video was released through Avex's YouTube channel on February 2. The song became the main theme of the Japanese TV show, 'Sukkiri'. The album also includes the song "Teenage Queen" which was originally created and written in English by 5 Seconds of Summer.

== Track listing ==
CD1
No.	Title	Lyrics	Music	Length
1.	"Bari 5 !"	H.U.B.	Warren David Meyers, Mathew Oscar Meyers, Daniel Thomas Boots, Ian Simpson	3:17
2.	"Oppa, Oppa"	Goro Matsui (Japanese Lyric)	Composed by Steven Greenberg; Arranged by PETER (Team One Sound)	3:18
3.	"Motorcycle"	Akira	Lars Pedersen, Remee S. Jackman, Nicky Fredrik Russell, Feras Agwa	3:25
4.	"Teenage Queen"	Amon Hayashi (Japanese Lyric)	Tiffany Vartanyan, Calum Hood, Luke Hemmings, David Musumeci, Anthony Egizii	3:35
5.	"君が泣いたら -Kimi ga Naitara- (When You Cry)"	Shirose	Zetton, Darren Martyn, Shirose	4:14
6.	"Kiss Kiss Dynamite"	Natsumi Kobayashi	Sam Gray	3:20
7.	"Android Syndrome"	Sara Sakurai	Neil Athale, Gustav Efraimsson, Mr. Success	3:06
8.	"Hello"	Sara Sakurai (Japanese Lyric)	PETER & YOUNG SKY & JINOO (Team One Sound)	3:36
9.	"Love That I Need" (feat. Henry of SJM)	Miyakei	NoizeBank (Henry Lau of Super Junior-M, Gen Neo, Issac Han, Neil Nallas)	3:26
10.	"I Wanna Dance"	Sara Sakurai, PETER & YOUNG SKY & JINOO (Team One Sound)	PETER & YOUNG SKY & JINOO (Team One Sound)	3:28
11.	"Ten years" (feat. Luna of f (x))	Miyakei	Michael Stockwell, Wesley Steed	3:52
12.	"Champagne Girl"	Sara Sakurai	Ricky Hanley, Daniel Sherman	4:04
13.	"Let It Go"	AKIRA	Kim Sangmi, Marco Borrero, Mica Gayle, R. Seragnoli	3:16

DVD

1. "Motorcycle" music video
2. "Oppa, Oppa" music video
3. "I Wanna Dance" music video
4. "Motorcycle" music video making clip
5. Ride Me JK making clip

== Oricon ==
Oricon Chart	Period	Peak	Debut sales	Total Sales
Daily Albums Chart	26 February 2014 (Released)	1	18,224	50,152+
Weekly Albums Chart	24 February - 2 March 2014	3	40,065	50,152+
Monthly Albums Chart	February 2014	8	40,065	50,152+

== Release history ==
Release history for Ride Me
Region	Date	Format	Label	Ref
Japan	February 26, 2014	CD; DVD	Avex Trax	
Various	February 26, 2014	Digital download; streaming	Avex Trax	—
