= The Beat Goes On (Super Junior-D&E EP) =

- The Beat Goes On album cover

EP by Super Junior-D&E
- Released: March 9, 2015
- Recorded: 2014–15
- Studio: Doobdoob (Seoul); In Grid (Seoul); SM Big Shot (Seoul); SM Blue Cup (Seoul); SM Blue Ocean (Seoul); SM Concert Hall (Seoul); SM Yellow Tail (Seoul); Sound Pool (Seoul)
- Genre: R&B; Electro house
- Length: 24:29
- Language: Korean
- Label: SM; KT Music
- Producer: Lee Soo-man; The Underdogs; Noizebank

Super Junior-D&E chronology
Ride Me (2014)	The Beat Goes On (2015)	Present (2015)

Singles from The Beat Goes On
- 1. "Oppa, Oppa" Released: 16 December 2011; 2. "Still You" Released: 13 December 2013; 3. "Growing Pains" Released: 5 March 2015

Music video
- "Growing Pains" on YouTube

The Beat Goes On is the first Korean extended play (EP) of South Korean pop duo Super Junior-D&E, a subgroup of the boy band Super Junior. The album was released on March 9, 2015 under SM Entertainment and distributed by KT Music.

== Background ==
Super Junior-D&E released short snippets and teaser videos of their music video for Growing Pains on March 2 and 3, 2015. On 4 March, Donghae and Eunhyuk shared snippets of all the songs on their unit group album, The Beat Goes On. The medley included pieces of the seven tracks on the album, including the title song, "Growing Pains". Donghae participated in the album production along with producers The Underdogs, Hitchhiker, NoizeBank and more. The showcase for The Beat Goes On took place at the SMTOWN Coex Artium on March 5 and the album released online on March 6 and offline on March 9.

They released the special edition album of The Beat Goes On on March 23, 2015. Including the seven tracks in the original album, Super Junior-D&E added on "Oppa, Oppa", "1+1=LOVE", "Still You", "Motorcycle", "Love that I Need", and I Wanna Dance" from its previous digital singles and Korean versions of Japanese hit songs for a total of 13 tracks in the special edition album.

== Track listing ==
No.	Title	Lyrics	Music	Length
1.	"The Beat Goes On"	Jo Yoon-kyung	The Underdogs; Patrick J. Que Smith; Dewain Whitemore; Adonis Shropshire	3:08
2.	"Growing Pains" (너는 나만큼; neoneun namankeum; lit. 'You're as much as me')	Lee Dong-hae; Team One Sound	Lee Dong-hae; Team One Sound	3:21
3.	"Sweater & Jeans"	Seo Ji-eum	Meagan Cottone; Nathan Duvall; Mich Hansen; Daniel Davidsen; Peter Wallevik	3:38
4.	"Breaking Up"	Goo Tae-woo	Ryan S. Jhun; Denzil "iDR" Remedios; Antwann Frost	3:40
5.	"Lights, Camera, Action!"	JQ (제이큐)	NoizeBank	3:17
6.	"Can You Feel It?" (촉이와; chog-iwa; lit. 'With a tick')	Lee Yoo-jin; Team One Sound; January 8th	Will Simms; Martin Mulholland; Nermin Harambašić	3:29
7.	"Mother"	Lee Dong-hae; Team One Sound	Lee Dong-hae; Team One Sound	3:56
Total length:				24:29

The Beat Goes On (Special Edition)
No.	Title	Lyrics	Music	Length
1.	"The Beat Goes On"	Jo Yoon-kyung	The Underdogs; Patrick J. Que Smith; Dewain Whitemore; Adonis Shropshire	3:08
2.	"Growing Pains" (너는 나만큼; neoneun namankeum; lit. 'You're as much as me')	Lee Dong-hae; Team One Sound	Lee Dong-hae; Team One Sound	3:21
3.	"Motorcycle"	JQ	Lars Pedersen; Remee S. Jackman; Nicky Fredrik Russell; Feras Agwa	3:26
4.	"1+1=Love"	Lee Dong-hae; Team One Sound	Lee Dong-hae; Team One Sound	3:32
5.	"Love That I Need" (feat. Henry of SJ-M)	Lee Dong-hae; Lee Hyuk-jae; Team One Sound	NoizeBank	3:27
6.	"I Wanna Dance" (사네; sane; lit. 'Sane')	Team One Sound	Team One Sound	3:28
7.	"Sweater & Jeans"	Seo Ji-eum	Meagan Cottone; Nathan Duvall; Mich Hansen; Daniel Davidsen; Peter Wallevik	3:38
8.	"Breaking Up"	Goo Tae-woo	Ryan S. Jhun; Denzil "iDR" Remedios; Antwann Frost	3:40
9.	"Can You Feel It?" (촉이와; chog-iwa; lit. 'With a tick')	Lee Yoo-jin; Team One Sound; January 8th	Will Simms; Martin Mulholland; Nermin Harambašić	3:29
10.	"Lights, Camera, Action!"	JQ (제이큐)	NoizeBank	3:17
11.	"Oppa, Oppa" (떴다 오빠; ddeotda Oppa; lit. 'Brother has risen')	Youngsky and Peter	Youngsky and Peter; Steve Greenberg	3:17
12.	"Mother"	Lee Dong-hae; Team One Sound	Lee Dong-hae; Team One Sound	3:56
13.	"Still You" (아직도 난; ajigdo nan; lit. 'Still I')	Lee Dong-hae; Team One Sound	Lee Dong-hae; Team One Sound	3:37
Total length:				45:19

== Charts ==
=== Album chart ===
==== Weekly chart ====
The Beat Goes On
Chart (2015)	Peak position
South Korean Weekly album (Gaon)	1
South Korean Weekly domestic album (Gaon)	1
US World Albums (Billboard)	4

The Beat Goes On (Special Edition)
Chart	Peak position
South Korean Weekly domestic album (Gaon)	2

==== Year-end chart ====
Chart	Position
2015 South Korean Albums (Gaon)	36

=== Single chart ===
Song	Peak chart position
Song	KOR
Song	Gaon Chart
"Growing pains"	23

== Album sales ==
Gaon Monthly Album Chart, South Korea
Year	Month	The Beat Goes On		The Beat Goes On (Special Edition)		Ref
Year	Month	Ranking	Sales	Ranking	Sales	Ref
2015	March	3	71,434	9	27,328	
2015	April	–	–	15	4,898	
2015	May	–	–	51	1,004	
2015	June	–	–	–	–	
2015	July	–	–	60	705	
2015	August	–	–	59	801	
2015	Sept	–	–	65	704	
2015	Total		107,159+			

== Awards and nominations ==
=== Music program awards ===
Song	Program	Date
"Growing Pains"	Music Bank (KBS)	March 20, 2015

== Release history ==
Release history for The Beat Goes On
Region	Date	Version	Format	Label	Ref
Various	March 6, 2015	The Beat Goes On	Digital download; streaming	SM	
South Korea	March 9, 2015	The Beat Goes On	CD	SM; KT Music	
South Korea	March 23, 2015	Special Edition	CD	SM; KT Music	
Various	March 23, 2015	Special Edition	Digital download; streaming	SM	
