= I Wanna Dance (Donghae & Eunhyuk song) =

- CD+DVD single cover

Single by Super Junior Donghae & Eunhyuk
- Language: Japanese
- B-side: "Love That I Need"
- Released: 19 June 2013
- Recorded: 2013
- Studio: In Grid (Seoul)
- Genre: Dance-pop
- Length: 3:30
- Label: Avex Trax
- Composer: Team One Sound
- Lyricists: Sara Sakurai; Team One Sound
- Producer: Team One Sound

Super Junior Donghae & Eunhyuk singles chronology
| "Oppa, Oppa" (2011) | "I Wanna Dance" (2013) | "Skeleton" (2014) |

Music video
- "I Wanna Dance (Short version)" on YouTube

I Wanna Dance is the second Japanese single by Super Junior's sub-group, Donghae & Eunhyuk, released on June 19, 2013 by Avex Trax.

== Lyrics ==
After an intro in English "Ladies and gentlemen i know you gonna dig this and the boys are back lets dance" the song lyrics commence:

"寝ている場合じゃない neteiru baai janai オールナイトは無条件 all night wa mujouken お嬢さんtonight一緒に来ない？

== Track listing ==
CD
| No. | Title | Lyrics | Music | Length |
|---|---|---|---|---|
| 1. | "I Wanna Dance" | Team One Sound | Team One Sound | 3:30 |
| 2. | "Love That I Need" (feat. Henry of Super Junior-M) | NoizeBank | NoizeBank | 3:26 |
| 3. | "I Wanna Dance" (Less Vocal) | Team One Sound | Team One Sound | 3:30 |
| 4. | "Love That I Need" (Less Vocal) | NoizeBank | NoizeBank | 3:26 |
| Total length: | | | | 13:52 |

DVD

1. "I Wanna Dance" music video
2. "I Wanna Dance" music video (Dance ver.)
3. "I Wanna Dance" music video making-of

== Chart ==
Oricon Albums Chart, Japan
| Chart | Period | Peak position | Reported sales |
|---|---|---|---|
| Daily Singles Chart | 19 June 2013 | 3 | 36,329 |
| Weekly Singles Chart | 17 – 23 June 2013 | 3 | 54,220 |
| Monthly Singles Chart | June 2013 | 12 | 56,450 |

Gaon Monthly Album Chart, South Korea
| Year | Month | I Wanna Dance (CD+DVD Version) | | I Wanna Dance (CD Version) | | Ref |
| Year | Month | Sales | Accumulative sales | Sales | Accumulative sales | Ref |
|---|---|---|---|---|---|---|
| 2013 | July | 3,800 | 3,800 | 2,498 | 2,498 | |
| Total | | 6,298+ | | | | |

== Release history ==
Release history for "I Wanna Dance"
| Region | Date | Format | Label |
|---|---|---|---|
| Japan | 19 June 2013 | CD; DVD | Avex Trax |
| Various | 19 June 2013 | Digital download; streaming | Avex Trax |
| South Korea | 26 June 2013 | Digital download; streaming | SM; KMP |
