= Super Junior-D&E =

Subgroup of the South Korean boy band Super Junior

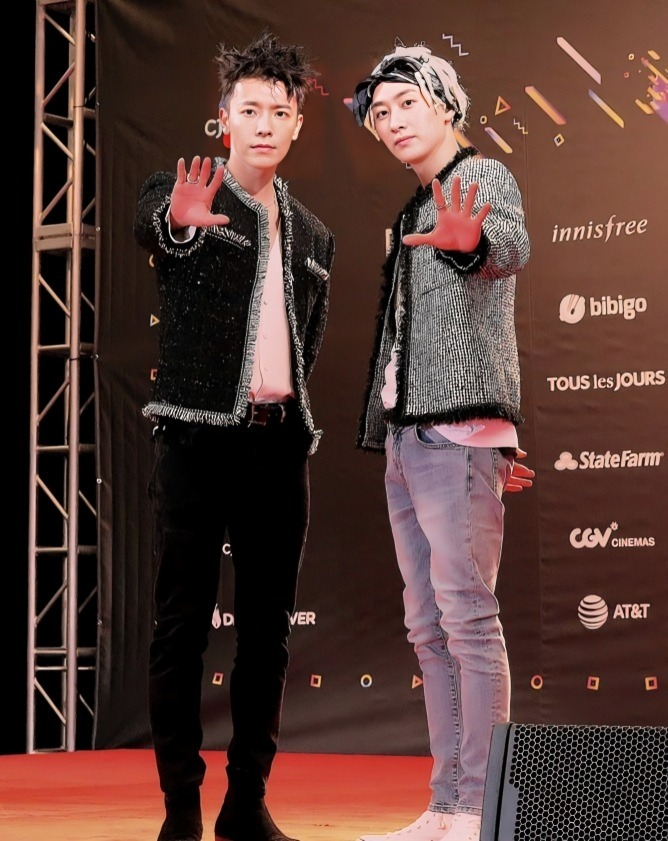
- Super Junior-D&E at KCON Los Angeles, in 2017

Background information
- Also known as: Donghae & Eunhyuk; D&E; SJ-D&E
- Origin: Seoul, South Korea
- Genres: K-pop; R&B; disco; house; electro hop; hip hop
- Years active: 2011–2015; 2017–present
- Labels: SM; Label SJ; Avex Trax; ODE; Warner Music Korea
- Spinoff of: Super Junior
- Members: Donghae; Eunhyuk
- Website: Japan Official Website

Super Junior-D&E (Korean: 슈퍼주니어-동해&은혁, also known as Donghae & Eunhyuk, D&E or SJ-D&E) is the fifth sub-unit of South Korean boy band Super Junior, composed of two Super Junior members: Donghae and Eunhyuk. The duo debuted on December 16, 2011, with their digital single "Oppa, Oppa".

== Career ==
=== 2011–2013: Formation and debut ===
Donghae and Eunhyuk were introduced publicly as a sub-unit for the first time by performing their song "Oppa Oppa" in Super Show 4 on November 19, 2011. Donghae & Eunhyuk officially debut with released digital single "Oppa, Oppa" on December 16, 2011. The music video were released in two version which the lead music video released on December 16 and the other music video released on December 21, directed by Shindong and starring Amber of f(x), Peter and Youngsky of One Way group with Sungmin and Shindong featured in the music video. The duo made their debuted stage on the same day in Music Bank.

The duo released a Japanese version of Oppa, Oppa on April 4, 2012. The single also contained lead single "Oppa, Oppa" and B-side single "First Love". "Oppa, Oppa" peaked at #2 on the Oricon single daily and weekly charts and #1 on the Tower Records single chart.

On June 19, 2013, the duo released their second Japanese single "I Wanna Dance" which also includes the B-side track "Love That I Need" featuring Super Junior-M member Henry.

They released their second digital single, "Still You" on December 18, 2013. The music video was filmed in London. They first performed "Still You" at SM Town Week: Super Junior Treasure Island on December 28 and 29.

=== 2014–2015: Ride Me, The Beat Goes On, Present and hiatus ===
The duo began promotions using the name Super Junior-D&E with the release of their first full-length Japanese album Ride Me on February 26, 2014. The album shortly peaked at #1 on the Oricon Daily Album. Avex previously released a short version of the "Motorcycle" promotional video (PV) on February 2. The song became the main theme of the Japanese TV show, 'Sukkiri'.

The duo kicked off their first Japan tour in Nagoya on 4 March 2014, visiting 8 cities including Osaka, Hiroshima, Fukuoka, Kobe, Niigata, Budokan and Tokyo for 22 performances. They sang a total of 22 songs, including "I Wanna Dance", "Oppa Oppa", and "BAMBINA". The duo wrapped up their concert tour from May 8 to 10 in Budokan, attracting a total of 100,000 fans for their 1st Japan Tour. Shortly after D&E 1st Japan Tour, the duo released their 3rd Japanese single titled "Skeleton" on August 6, 2014.

Their first EP, The Beat Goes On was released on March 6. They also held a comeback showcase at the SMTOWN Coex Artium one day before the release of the EP. Donghae participated in the album production along with producers The Underdogs, Hitchhiker, NoizeBank and more. The duo made their comeback performance on the music show Music Bank with the songs "Growing Pains" and "The Beat Goes On" on March 6, 2015, and kept promotions going on Music Core, Inkigayo and M! Countdown. On March 24, The duo released a special edition album for The Beat Goes On. Including the seven tracks in the original album, "Oppa, Oppa", "1+1=LOVE", "Still You", "Motorcycle", "Love That I Need", and "I Wanna Dance" from its previous digital singles and Korean versions of Japanese songs for a total of 13 tracks in the special edition album.

On April 1, they released their first Japanese EP titled Present, which contained a total of eight songs including the lead single "Saturday Night". They also held their second Japan tour Super Junior D&E The 2nd Japan Tour - Present- from April 3 till April 23 in four cities Saitama, Osaka, Nagoya and Fukuoka with 10 performances. The concerts concluded with a total attendance of more than 100,000 fans.

The duo held their Asia tour titled "Present" which kicked off in Taipei on June 6, following three other cities in Asia: Hong Kong, Shanghai and Bangkok with total five performances. The duo released their fourth Japanese single titled "Let's Get It On" on September 30.

On October 4, the Gangnam K-Pop Festival was held on Yeongdong Street in Seoul. It marked Donghae and Eunhyuk's final public appearance before heading to the army. As a result, the sub-group temporarily halted their activities during the members' enlistment. Eunhyuk and Donghae enlisted for their mandatory military service on October 13, 2015, and October 15, 2015, respectively.

=== 2017–2022: Style, Bout You, Danger, Bad Blood, and Countdown ===
Eunhyuk and Donghae were discharged from their mandatory military service on July 12 and July 14, respectively. Following their discharged, the duo held their fan meeting Hello Again on July 23 at Sejong University Daeyang Hall and later participated in SM Town Live World Tour VI in Japan on July 27–28.

The duo plans to release one Japanese song every month starting November 2017, ahead of releasing their upcoming full album sometime in 2018. On November 29, they released the first Japanese single of the series, titled "Here We Are". One month later, on December 26, D&E released the second Japanese single titled "You don't go".

On January 31, 2018, they released their third Japanese monthly single titled "If You", written and composed by Donghae. On February 28, 2018, their fourth Japanese monthly single "Circus". On March 28, 2018, their fifth Japanese monthly single titled "Lose It". The music video with the duo's toy model as main characters, was released in 3 episodes on March 28, 2018, March 30, 2018, and April 1, 2018. On April 2, 2018, the full version of the music video was released. Their sixth Japanese monthly single "Can I Stay..." was released on April 25, 2018. The seventh Japanese monthly single, "Hot Babe" was released on May 31, 2018.

In June 2018, D&E announced the release of their third full-length Japanese album titled STYLE on August 8, 2018, which contains every monthly song that had been released and also new songs, including the lead single "Sunrise" and "Polygraph". Following the release of the album, the Japan nationwide tour titled "Style" was held from September 2018 to November 2018 in seven cities: Yokohama, Kobe, Tokyo, Nagoya, Hiroshima, Fukuoka and Sapporo. D&E released their second Korean EP titled 'Bout You on August 16, 2018, with eight tracks including the lead single of the same name.

D&E held their first domestic concert The D&E on April 13 and 14 at the Olympic Hall, with an attendance of 7,000 fans. During their concert, the duo also released their third Korean EP Danger on April 14, 2019, with seven tracks.

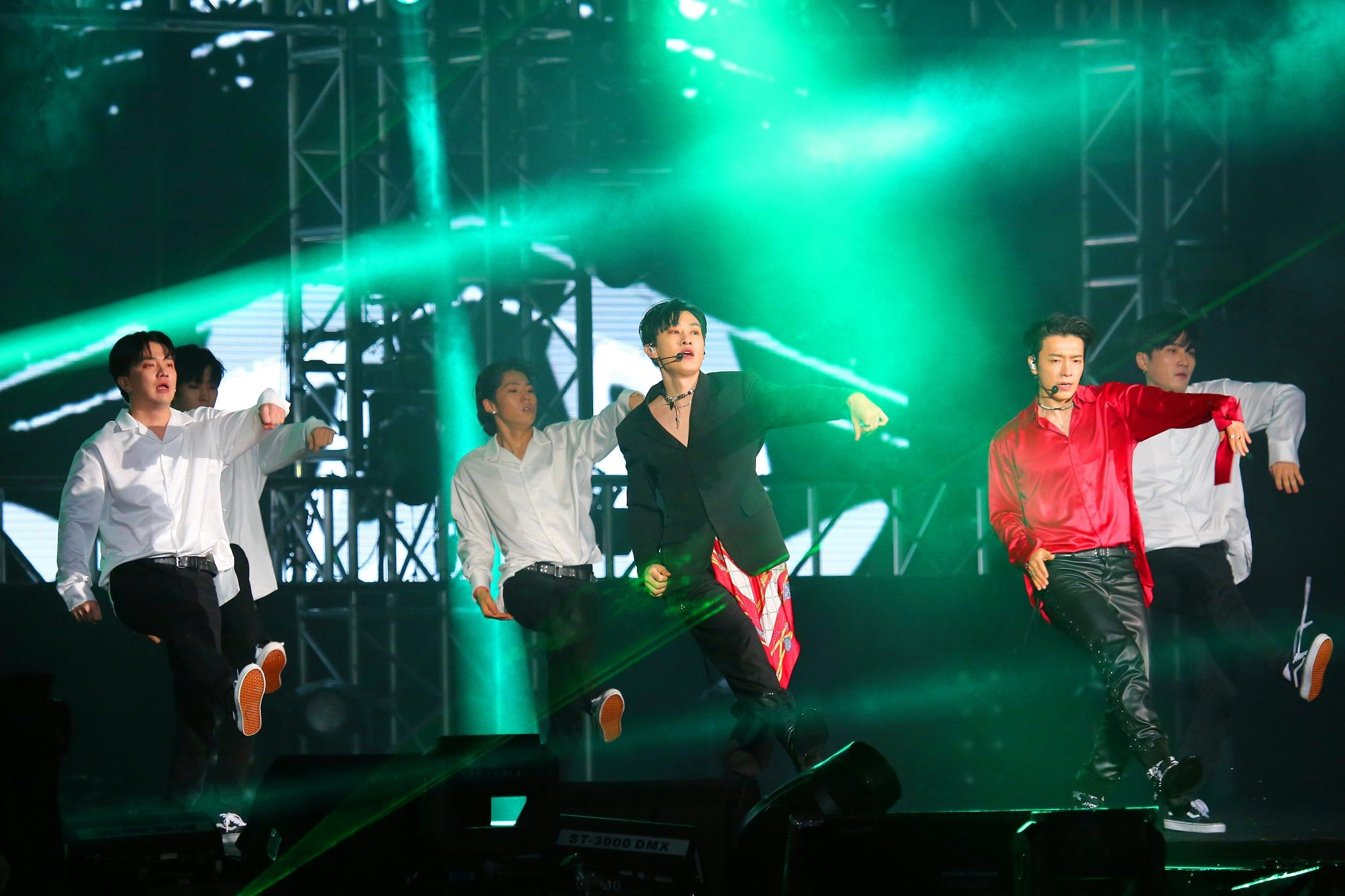
Super Junior-D&E performing in Taipei during the New Year's Eve in 2019

On December 31, 2019, they performed at Taipei New Year's Eve stage in Taiwan. They sang several of their hit singles, namely "Danger", "Growing Pains", "'Bout You" and "Oppa Oppa".

On September 3, 2020, their fourth EP, Bad Blood was released, alongside Bad Liar on September 28. On November 25, 2020, they released a Japanese single titled "Wings".

On November 2, 2021, D&E released their first Korean studio album Countdown. Donghae and Eunhyuk did solo songs as pre-release singles for their upcoming album. Donghae released the single "California Love" on October 13, featuring Jeno of NCT, while Eunhyuk released the single "Be" on October 20. On December 10, they released a special version of their studio album titled Countdown - Zero ver. (Epilogue).

=== 2023–present: First world tour and new label ===
The duo held their first fancon world tour, DElight Party, starting in June in South Korea and running with announced stops till December 2023. The tour includes stops in Asia, Oceania, and North America.

In July 2023, the duo's solo activities contract expired with SM, while their activities with Super Junior would remain under SM Entertainment. It was confirmed that the duo's future activities would continue with them under new label and then became the only sub-unit of Super Junior had managed under different label with Super Junior. On September 1, D&E founded their agency, ODE Entertainment, with Donghae and Eunhyuk serving as co-CEOs.

In January 2024, D&E announced plans to expand their activities in Japan, joining hands with Warner Music Korea, which would charge as their Japan's management and would launch an official Japanese fanclub site.

On March 11, 2024, it was announced that D&E would be releasing their fifth EP 606 on March 26 as their first release under their new label. The pre-release single "Rose" was released on March 19. The entire EP was released with six tracks, including the pre-release single and lead single "GGB".

On April 2, the duo announced the dates for their live tour in Japan, Departure, with shows scheduled between April 12 to June 26 across 9 cities. On April 10, their Japanese single "Like That" was released and announced as the pre-release single for their upcoming album. Later on June 24, D&E released another Japanese single "You&Me". On July 1, it was announced that their 2nd Japanese EP You&Me would be release on July 31.

On August 1, D&E revealed Asia continents for their upcoming World Tour Eclipse, with shows across 7 countries scheduled between September 28, 2024, to January 26, 2025. On August 5, D&E released Chinese single "Promise" with the remaining members of Super Junior-M : Siwon, Zhoumi, Ryeowook and Kyuhyun.

On September 12, it was announced that D&E would be releasing their sixth extended play Inevitable on October 25.

== Discography ==
Korean albums

- Countdown (2021)

Japanese albums

- Ride Me (2014)
- Style (2018)

== Tours and concerts ==
=== Asia tour ===
==== Super Junior D&E Asia Tour 2015 -Present- (2015) ====
Dates	City	County	Avenue
June 6, 2015	Taipei	Taiwan	Baru-Central Gymnasium
June 7, 2015	Taipei	Taiwan	Baru-Central Gymnasium
June 20, 2015	Hong Kong	China	Asia World Arena
June 27, 2015	Shanghai	China	Shanghai Grand Stage
August 12, 2015	Bangkok	Thailand	Royal Paragon Hall

==== The D&E (2019) ====
Date	City	Country	Venue	Attendance
April 13, 2019	Seoul	South Korea	Olympic Park Olympic Hall	Total 7,000
April 14, 2019	Seoul	South Korea	Olympic Park Olympic Hall	Total 7,000
May 4, 2019	Kuala Lumpur	Malaysia	Malawati Stadium	12,000
May 25, 2019	Bangkok	Thailand	Thunder Dome	5,000
June 22, 2019	Taipei	Taiwan	Xinzhuang Gymnasium	Total 10,000
June 23, 2019	Taipei	Taiwan	Xinzhuang Gymnasium	Total 10,000
June 29, 2019	Hong Kong		AsiaWorld Expo Hall 10	5,000
August 27, 2019	Tokyo	Japan	Makuhari Messe Event Hall	Total 16,000
August 28, 2019	Tokyo	Japan	Makuhari Messe Event Hall	Total 16,000

=== Japan tour ===
==== Super Junior D&E The 1st Japan Tour 2014 ====
Date	City	Country	Venue	Attendance
March 4, 2014	Nagoya	Japan	Nagoya International Exhibition Hall	4,500
March 5, 2014	Nagoya	Japan	Nagoya International Exhibition Hall	4,500
March 6, 2014	Nagoya	Japan	Nagoya International Exhibition Hall	4,500
March 8, 2014	Osaka	Japan	Osaka Castle Hall	26,000
March 9, 2014	Osaka	Japan	Osaka Castle Hall	26,000
March 12, 2014	Hiroshima	Japan	HGB Hall	4,000
March 13, 2014	Hiroshima	Japan	HGB Hall	4,000
March 17, 2014	Fukuoka	Japan	Fukuoka Sunpalace	6,900
March 18, 2014	Fukuoka	Japan	Fukuoka Sunpalace	6,900
March 19, 2014	Fukuoka	Japan	Fukuoka Sunpalace	6,900
April 11, 2014	Kobe	Japan	Kobe World Memorial Hall	10,000
April 12, 2014	Kobe	Japan	Kobe World Memorial Hall	10,000
April 13, 2014	Kobe	Japan	Kobe World Memorial Hall	10,000
April 17, 2014	Niigata	Japan	Niigata Prefectural Civic Center	3,400
April 18, 2014	Niigata	Japan	Niigata Prefectural Civic Center	3,400
April 22, 2014	Tokyo	Japan	Tokyo Dome City Hall	6,000
April 23, 2014	Tokyo	Japan	Tokyo Dome City Hall	6,000
April 28, 2014	Sapporo	Japan	Nitori Culture Hall	4,600
April 29, 2014	Sapporo	Japan	Nitori Culture Hall	4,600
May 8, 2014	Tokyo	Japan	Nippon Budokan	33,000
May 9, 2014	Tokyo	Japan	Nippon Budokan	33,000
May 10, 2014	Tokyo	Japan	Nippon Budokan	33,000

==== Super Junior D&E The 2nd Japan Tour ====
Dates	City	Country	Venue	Attendances
April 3, 2015	Saitama	Japan	Saitama Super Arena	45,000
April 4, 2015	Saitama	Japan	Saitama Super Arena	45,000
April 5, 2015	Saitama	Japan	Saitama Super Arena	45,000
April 9, 2015	Osaka	Japan	Osaka-Jo Hall	48,000
April 10, 2015	Osaka	Japan	Osaka-Jo Hall	48,000
April 11, 2015	Osaka	Japan	Osaka-Jo Hall	48,000
April 18, 2015	Nagoya	Japan	Nippon Galshi Hall Nagoya	20,000
April 19, 2015	Nagoya	Japan	Nippon Galshi Hall Nagoya	20,000
April 22, 2015	Fukuoka	Japan	Marine Messe Fukuoka	20,000
April 23, 2015	Fukuoka	Japan	Marine Messe Fukuoka	20,000

==== Super Junior-D&E Japan Tour 2018 ~Style~ ====
Dates	City	Country	Venue	Attendances
September 7, 2018	Yokohama	Japan	Pacifico Yokohama	—
September 8, 2018	Yokohama	Japan	Pacifico Yokohama	—
September 15, 2018	Kobe	Japan	World Memorial Hall	—
September 16, 2018	Kobe	Japan	World Memorial Hall	—
September 17, 2018	Kobe	Japan	World Memorial Hall	—
September 27, 2018	Tokyo	Japan	Tokyo International Forum	—
September 28, 2018	Tokyo	Japan	Tokyo International Forum	—
October 2, 2018	Tokyo	Japan	Tokyo International Forum	—
October 3, 2018	Tokyo	Japan	Tokyo International Forum	—
October 12, 2018	Nagoya	Japan	Century Hall	—
October 13, 2018	Nagoya	Japan	Century Hall	—
October 20, 2018	Hiroshima	Japan	HGB Park	—
October 21, 2018	Hiroshima	Japan	HGB Park	—
October 27, 2018	Fukuoka	Japan	Fukuoka Sunpalace	—
October 28, 2018	Fukuoka	Japan	Fukuoka Sunpalace	—
November 3, 2018	Sapporo	Japan	Sapporo Art Park	—
November 4, 2018	Sapporo	Japan	Sapporo Art Park	—
November 8, 2018	Tokyo	Japan	Nippon Budokan	—
November 9, 2018	Tokyo	Japan	Nippon Budokan	—

=== D&E World Tour Fancon "DElight Party" 2023 ===
Dates	City	County	Avenue
June 24, 2023	Seoul	South Korea	Olympic Hall
June 25, 2023	Seoul	South Korea	Olympic Hall
July 29, 2023	Taipei	Taiwan	Taipei International Convention Center
July 30, 2023	Taipei	Taiwan	Taipei International Convention Center
August 13, 2023	Hong Kong	China	AsiaWorld–Expo
August 19, 2023	Bangkok	Thailand	Thunderdome Stadium
August 20, 2023	Bangkok	Thailand	Thunderdome Stadium
August 26, 2023	Jakarta	Indonesia	Istora Gelora Bung Karno
September 2, 2023	Ho Chi Minh City	Vietnam	Phú Thọ Indoor Stadium
September 9, 2023	Kuala Lumpur	Malaysia	Mega Star Arena
September 30, 2023	Manila	Philippines	Smart Araneta Coliseum
October 7, 2023	Riyadh	Saudi Arabia	Boulevard Riyadh City
October 19, 2023	Auckland	New Zealand	—
October 21, 2023	Melbourne	Australia	Festival Hall
October 22, 2023	Sydney	Australia	Hordern Pavilion
November 8, 2023	Singapore		The Star Performing Arts Theatre
November 11, 2023	Dubai	United Arab Emirates	—
November 12, 2023	Vancouver	Canada	Harbour Event
November 18, 2023	Mexico City	Mexico	Frontón México
November 19, 2023	Mexico City	Mexico	Frontón México
November 21, 2023	San José	Costa Rica	Palacio de los Deportes
November 23, 2023	Santiago	Chile	Teatro Caupolicán
November 25, 2023	Monterrey	Mexico	
November 28, 2023	Toronto	Canada	Meridian Hall
December 2, 2023	Macau	China	—
December 3, 2023	Macau	China	—
December 16, 2023	Tokyo	Japan	Makuhari Messe

=== Supporting act ===
- 2015 FAMILY FESTIVAL 'K-WAVE CONCERT'
- 2018 Sweet 17 Trans Media

== Awards and nominations ==
Year	Award	Nominated work	Result	Ref.
Asia Model Awards
2015	Popularity Award	Super Junior-D&E	Won	
Japan Gold Disc Award
2016	Album of the Year	Present	Won	
2016	Best 3 Album	Present	Won	
