= Style (Super Junior-D&E album) =

2018 Japanese studio album by Super Junior-D&E

- CD only cover

Studio album by Super Junior-D&E
- Released: August 8, 2018
- Recorded: 2017–18
- Studio: In Grid (Seoul)
- Genre: J-pop; R&B
- Length: 37:28
- Language: Japanese
- Label: Avex Trax; SM Japan; Label SJ
- Producer: Nam So-young; Shinji Hayashi

Super Junior-D&E chronology
Present (2015)	Style (2018)	'Bout You (2018)

Singles from Style
- 1. "Here We Are" Released: November 29, 2017; 2. "You Don't Go" Released: December 26, 2017; 3. "If You" Released: January 31, 2018; 4. "Circus" Released: February 28, 2018; 5. "Lose It" Released: March 28, 2018; 6. "Can I Stay" Released: April 25, 2018; 7. "Hot Babe" Released: May 30, 2018

Music video
- "Here We Are" on YouTube "Sunrise" on YouTube

Style is the second Japanese studio album of Super Junior-D&E, a subgroup of the boy band Super Junior, released on August 8, 2018, under Avex Trax, SM Japan, and Label SJ. The album is their first Japanese comeback in three years following their second Japanese EP, Present. Style consists of 11 tracks, including lead singles "Here We Are" and "Sunrise". It was supported with the monthly release of seven singles lasting from November 2017 until May 2018, leading to the full release of the album.

== Background ==
Following their discharge from their mandatory military service, Donghae, and Eunhyuk held a fan meeting event called Hello Again on July 23 in Sejong University. The duo also made an appearance at SM Town Live World Tour VI in Tokyo from July 27–28.

The duo released one monthly Japanese single as they geared towards a full album release sometime in 2018. Starting from November 29, 2017, they released '"Here We Are", the first release of the series. A month later on December 26, the duo released "You Don't Go".

In 2018, the duo continued their monthly release by releasing "If You" on January 31. On February 28, the duo released "Circus". On March 31, the duo released their fifth Japanese single titled "Lose It". On April 25, the duo released their sixth Japanese single, titled "Can I Stay..." Their final monthly release came in the release of "Hot Babe" on May 30.

Label SJ confirmed in June that the duo would release Style on August 8 with four additional songs alongside the previously released singles. The label also confirmed that there will be a nationwide tour across Japan to promote the album.

== Promotion ==
The duo embarked on a nationwide tour titled Super Junior-D&E Japan Tour 2018: Style across Japan from September to November to promote the album. Along the way the tour stopped at Yokohama (September 7–8), Kobe (September 15–17), Tokyo (September 27–28, October 2–3), Nagoya (October 12–13, 21), Hiroshima (October 27–28), Fukuoka (November 3–4), and Sapporo (November 8–9).

== Track listing ==
Style track listing
No.	Title	Lyrics	Music	Arrangement	Length
1.	"Here We Are"	J-Hype; Amon Hayashi	J-Hype	J-Hype	3:17
2.	"Polygraph"	Ume	Andreas Öberg; Park Seul-gi; SQVARE	Andreas Öberg; Park Seul-gi; SQVARE	2:49
3.	"Sunrise"	Ume; Eunhyuk; J-Dub; Donghae	J-Dub; Donghae	Donghae; J-Dub	3:32
4.	"You Don't Go"	Akira	Eric Scullin; Rodnae 'Chikk' Bell; Shin Hyuk; Stephen Stahl; M Rey		3:46
5.	"Lose It"	H.Toyosaki	J-Hype	J-Hype	2:59
6.	"Circus"	Sakai	Scott Stoddart; Kyler Niko	Scott Stoddart; Kyler Niko	3:44
7.	"Hot Babe"	Gashima; Eunhyuk	Jake K; Eunhyuk	Jake K; Eunhyuk	3:57
8.	"Take It Slow"	H.Toyosaki	MonoTree; Hye-Jun Zo	MonoTree; Hye-Jun Zo	3:06
9.	"If You"	Jinoo; Hasegawa; Donghae	Jinoo; Donghae	Jinoo; Donghae	3:32
10.	"More Tightly" (More Tightly (もっとぎゅっと, Motto gyutto))	Hidenori Tanaka	Lee Won-jong; Oh Ja-hyun; Clef Crew	Lee Won-jong; Oh Ja-hyun; Clef Crew	3:22
11.	"Can I Stay..."	Ume	Jordan Weiner; Jenson Vaughan, B.K. (DEU); Craig Smart	Jordan Weiner; Jenson Vaughan, B.K. (DEU); Craig Smart	3:34
Total length:					37:28

== Charts ==
Weekly chart performance for Style
Chart (2018)	Peak position
Japan Hot Albums (Billboard Japan)	4

== See also ==
- Super Junior-D&E discography

== Release history ==
Release history for Style
Region	Date	Format	Label	Ref
Japan	August 8, 2018	CD; DVD; Blu-ray	Avex Trax	
Various	August 8, 2018	Digital download; streaming	Avex Trax	
