= One Way (South Korean band) =

South Korean boy band

- Origin: South Korea
- Genres: R&B, hip hop
- Years active: 2010–2016
- Label: independent
- Spinoffs: Detour
- Members: Peter; Sky
- Past members: Chance

One Way (Korean: 원웨이) is a contemporary South Korean R&B/hip hop group. The duo consists of vocalist Peter and rapper Sky. They made their debut on March 6, 2010 on MBC's Music Core with their promotional single, "Magic". Since their debut, they have appeared in many radio shows, such as MBC Starry Night, TBS K-popular hosted by As One, TBS Music Planet hosted by J.ae, and Arirang Evening Groove hosted by DJ Dorothy.

One Way is considered to be an up-and-coming R&B group that is garnering attention both in South Korea and internationally for composing their own music and their unique "one way sound". They have posted various covers on their official YouTube channel, such as Ne-Yo's "Sexy Love", and made their official debut on YouTube with their self-written track "U-Drag", which is also featured on their first episode called One Way Street.

== History ==
Peter and Sky first met in high school in Sydney, Australia. Later on, Sky moved to Los Angeles, California, where he met Chance in high school. All three members are fluent in English and Korean.

One Way's debut in the United States took place at Stony Brook University's Korean Night on April 7, 2011, followed by Rutgers University's ProjectKorea - IV on April 8, 2011.

In 2011, it was announced that Chance would be putting the group on hiatus.

The two members, Sky and Peter, later decided to make a sub-unit called "Detour". Former member Chance became a member of the music composing and production team Duble Sidekick as the leader and main composer. He was later successful and was able to collaborate with artists such as 2PM, B.A.P's Yongguk, MBLAQ, Haha&Skull, Baek Jiyoung, Huh Gak, Zia, B1A4, Dalmatian and The Seeya; his team also won the "Song Writer Award" in the MelOn Music Awards.

== Members ==
=== Current ===
- Peter
- Sky

=== Former ===
- Chance

== Discography ==
- One Way Remix (May 19, 2010)

CD Track list:

1. "U-drag"
2. "One-way"
3. "Magic"
4. "없는 번호" (Obneun Beonho)
5. "CASINO"
- One Way Street (March 4, 2010)

CD Track list:

1. "U-drag"
2. "One-way"
3. "Magic"
4. "없는 번호" (Obneun Beonho)
5. "CASINO"
6. "Magic" (R&B Remix)
7. "Magic" (instrumental)
8. "없는 번호" (Obneun Beonho) (instrumental)
- One Way Street Philippine Edition (August 6, 2010)

CD Track list:

1. "U-drag"
2. "One-way"
3. "Magic"
4. "없는 번호" (Obneun Beonho)
5. "CASINO"
6. "Magic" (R&B remix)
7. "Magic" (instrumental)
8. "없는 번호" (Obneun Beonho) (instrumental)

Bonus tracks and bonus DVD
Philippines only bonus tracks:

9. "Wrong Number" (English version)
10. "Wrong Number" (remix)
11. "Wrong Number" (Collaboration with Christian Bautista)

Bonus DVD – music videos of:

1. "Magic"
2. "Wrong Number"
3. "U Drag"
4. "One Way"
- "Rainy Days" (digital single) (August 6, 2010)
1. "Rainy Days" (Feat. Jun. K of 2PM)
2. "Rainy Days" (English unplugged ver.)
- Rainy Days (full album) (Jan 4, 2011)
1. "The Forecast" (feat. One Sound Choir)
2. "Rainy Days" (feat. Jun. K (준수) of 2PM)
3. "New Drag"
4. "빠져" (Ppajyeo)
5. "Forever"
6. "Flight 101" (feat. As One)
7. "Can't Stop"
8. "Coffee" (feat. J.ae)
9. "Rainy Days" (unplugged English version)
10. "A Thousand Words"
11. "Coffee" (Trumpet version) – bonus track
12. "Forever" (Harmonica version) – bonus track
13. "A Thousand Words" (Harmonica version) – bonus track
14. "Rainy Days" (radio edited version) – bonus track
- Beautiful Day (single MV) (June 4, 2013)
- Vibes (single) (Nov 23, 2016)
