= Oppa, Oppa =

2011 Single by Super Junior-D&E

Single by Donghae&Eunhyuk
- Language: Korean
- B-side: "First Love"
- Released: 16 December 2011
- Recorded: 2011
- Studio: SM Blue Ocean (Seoul)
- Genre: Dance-pop
- Length: 5:20
- Label: SM; Avex Taiwan; KMP Holdings
- Songwriter: Peter, Youngsky
- Producer: One Way

Donghae&Eunhyuk singles chronology
"Oppa, Oppa" (2011)	"Still You" (2013)

Oppa, Oppa (Korean: 떴다오빠; RR: Ddeotda Oppa, literally: Brother Has Risen) is a digital single by Super Junior sub-group, Donghae&Eunhyuk. It was released on-line on 16 December 2011 by SM Entertainment and distributed by KMP Holdings.

The single was digitally released in Taiwan on 21 December 2011 by Avex Taiwan. It was also released in Japan on 4 April 2012 by Avex Trax, as a CD single with Japanese and Korean versions of the songs.

== Background ==
The single comprises two songs, the title track "Oppa, Oppa" and ballad "First Love". "Oppa, Oppa", written and produced by frequent collaborators Youngsky and Peter of Korean R&B/hip-hop group One Way, is a track that features a "lively rhythm and beat in a retro dance atmosphere" with lyrics implying their group's popularity. The song also has a similar lyrical concept to the group's track with f(x), "Oops!", from the repackaged album A-Cha. It also contains an interpolation of the song "Funkytown" by Lipps Inc. "First Love" is a two-minute piano ballad written by Donghae which serves as a prelude to the title track.

The song was first performed at group's Super Show 4 Seoul concert on 19 November 2011. Then, a month after the performance, SM Entertainment announced that both Donghae and Eunhyuk will promote the song on music shows: Music Bank on 16 December, Music Core on 17 December and Inkigayo on 18 December.

== Music videos ==
The first music video was also released on 16 December, which features the performance of the song in Super Show 4. Another version was released on 21 December 2011 and was edited and directed by Super Junior member Shindong, marking it his directorial debut. In this video, there are cameo appearances by Amber of Korean girl group f(x), Youngsky, Peter of One Way, and Shindong.

== Track listing ==
No.	Title	Lyrics	Music	Length
1.	"First Love" (첫사랑)	Donghae	Peter (Team Onesound) and Donghae	2:06
2.	"Oppa, Oppa" (떴다 오빠)	Youngsky and Peter	Youngsky and Peter	3:17
Total length:				5:20

== Japanese release ==
"Oppa, Oppa"
- CD only cover

Single by Donghae&Eunhyuk

from the album Ride Me
- Language: Japanese
- Released: 4 April 2012
- Recorded: 2012
- Genre: Dance-pop
- Length: 10:40
- Label: Avex Trax
- Composer: Peter, Youngsky
- Producer: One Way

Donghae&Eunhyuk singles chronology
"Oppa, Oppa" (2012)	"I Wanna Dance" (2013)

The single was released in Japanese with an original Japanese music video on 4 April 2012. On the day of its release, it reached number two on Oricon Daily Chart with 42,114 copies sold. It debut at number two on Oricon Weekly Chart for the week of 2 to 8 April 2012 with 68,475 copies sold and number one on Tower Records' daily charts. The pair then held a fan meeting, Premium Mini Live Event, in support of the single on 11 April at Shibuya-AX, Tokyo.

=== Track listing ===
CD
No.	Title	Lyrics	Music	Length
1.	"First Love" (첫사랑)	Donghae	Peter (Team Onesound) and Donghae	2:06
2.	"Oppa, Oppa" (떴다 오빠)	Youngsky and Peter	Youngsky and Peter	3:17
3.	"First Love (Korean version)" (첫사랑)	Donghae	Peter (Team Onesound) and Donghae	2:06
4.	"Oppa, Oppa (Korean version)" (떴다 오빠)	Youngsky and Peter	Youngsky and Peter	3:17
Total length:				10:40

DVD

1. "Oppa, Oppa" music video
2. "Oppa, Oppa" music video (dance version type A)
3. music video making-of

== Chart ==
Chart	Period	Peak position	Reported sales
Oricon Daily Singles Chart	4 April 2012	2	42,114
Oricon Weekly Singles Chart	2 – 8 April 2012	2	68,475
