= Lee Donghae =

South Korean singer-songwriter and actor

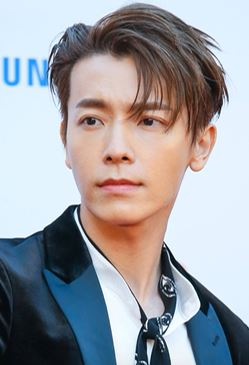
- Donghae in 2017
- Born: October 15, 1986 (age 40); Mokpo, South Korea
- Occupations: Singer; songwriter; actor
- Years active: 2005–present
- Musical career
- Genres: K-pop; R&B; soft rock; synthpop
- Labels: SM; Label SJ; ODE
- Member of: Super Junior; Super Junior-M; Super Junior-D&E; SM The Performance; SM Town
- Website: Official website

Korean name
- Hangul: 이동해
- RR: I Donghae
- MR: I Tonghae

Signature
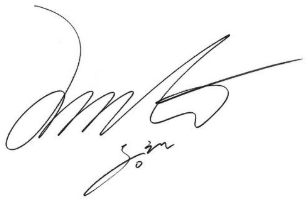

Lee Donghae (born October 15, 1986), known mononymously as Donghae, is a South Korean singer, songwriter, and actor. He became a trainee under SM Entertainment after winning a prize at SM's Youth Best Contest in 2001. After four years of training, Donghae debuted as a member of boy group Super Junior (and later its subgroup Super Junior-M and Super Junior-D&E) in November 2005. In July 2023, Donghae left SM Entertainment, although he remains as a member of Super Junior. Two months later, Donghae along with Eunhyuk, founded a new label under the name of ODE.en to manage his solo activities as well as D&E's activities. He is the co-founder of the label.

== Career ==
=== 1986–2011: Early life and career beginnings ===
Lee Donghae was born in Mokpo, South Korea. His grandmother helped his mother to deliver him. He has an elder brother named Lee Dong-hwa. When he was young, he wanted to become a football player. However, his father wanted him to be a singer since he gave up on his dream to become one himself. In 2001, Donghae signed with SM Entertainment after winning a prize at SM's Youth Best Contest. Under SM Entertainment, Donghae was put in singing, dancing, and acting lessons, and was then recruited into a five-member boy band Smile, with future bandmate Leeteuk, but the idea was soon dropped. In 2004, Donghae, along with Leeteuk, was put into a twelve-member boy band named Super Junior 05.

Donghae officially debuted as part of 12-member project group Super Junior 05 on November 6, 2005. He made his acting debut in Super Junior's horror documentary Mystery 6, broadcast in early 2006. The documentary surrounds Donghae and his peculiar ability to see and feel ghosts. In August 2006, Donghae played the role of a human turned cyborg in the Korean version of BoA's music video drama, "Key of Heart".

In 2007, he played a role in Attack on the Pin-Up Boys.

In April 2008, a Super Junior's Chinese subgroup Super Junior-M was formed with Donghae and fellow members Hangeng, Siwon, Ryeowook, Kyuhyun, Henry, Zhou Mi. Their debut album, Me, debuted in Korea's MIAK Monthly Charts as #10 and reached #1 in China's Top in Music chart.

In 2010, he played in a drama It's Okay, Daddy's Girl.

In April 2011, Donghae co-starred again with fellow member Siwon, in the Taiwanese drama Skip Beat! with Ivy Chen. He also sang the ending theme song, "This is Love," which also featured fellow Super Junior-M member Henry.

Donghae sang the theme song for the 2011 8th Asia Song Festival, "Dreams Come True", with Seohyun of Girls' Generation

On December 16, 2011, a Super Junior subgroup D&E was formed with Donghae and fellow member Eunhyuk. They began the project with released debut single Oppa, Oppa. The single was also released in Japanese, in April 2012.

=== 2012–2015: Acting roles, Lyrics Writing and Composing, Military enlistment ===
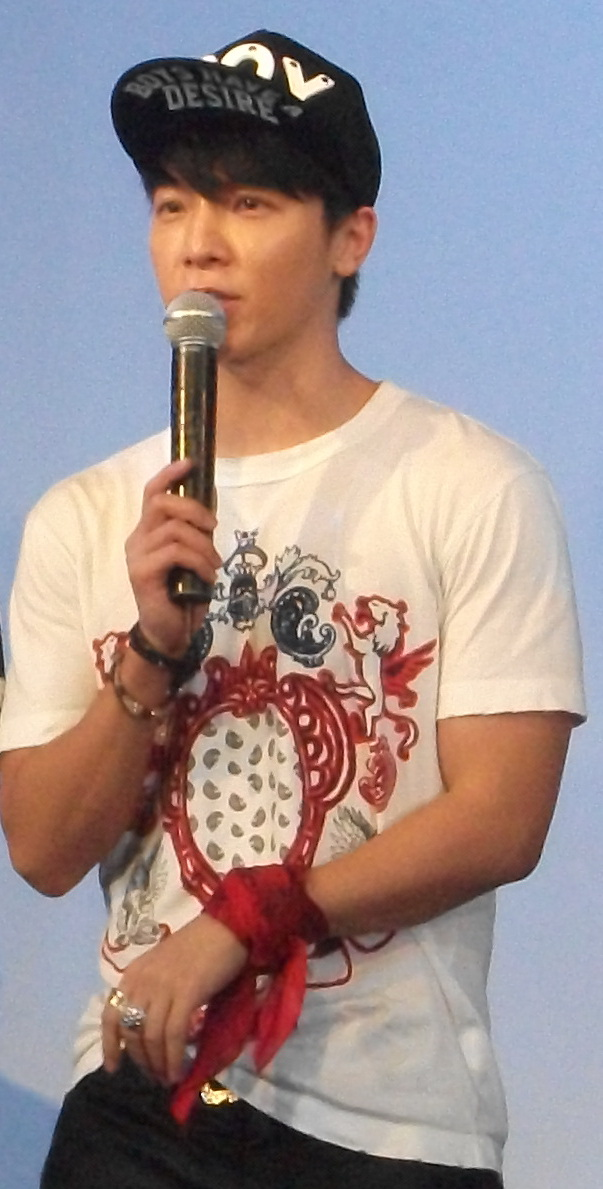
Lee Donghae at press conference of Super Junior-M Break Down in Bangkok

In May 2012, Donghae was cast in the title role of Mr. Hedgehog in the romantic comedy Miss Panda and Mr. Hedgehog. Donghae also sang his character Go Seung-gi's theme song "Plz Don't", which was released online on 20 August.

In June 2012, Donghae reunited with Super Junior for their sixth studio album, Sexy, Free & Single. In the repackaged edition of the album, re-titled Spy, Donghae co-wrote the lyrics for "Only U" with Leeteuk; and co-composed "Haru" with Urban Zakapa's Kwon Soon-il.

In December 2012, Donghae joined SM new dance project group, S.M. The Performance, contributing his dance skill to covered performance for Zedd's Spectrum on SBS Gayo Daejeon on December 29 and later the song released digitally on December 30.

Due to a scheduling conflict, Donghae turned down the casting offer for horror film 'Tunnel'; however, he was later cast as the star lead in the short film The Youth-The Rumor. Donghae was to join the cast of Quiz of God Season 4 as Han Si Woo, a medical researcher. The show aired its first episode on May 18.

In August 2014, Super Junior's seventh album, Mamacita was released, where Donghae also contributing music and lyrics to their second lead single, "Shirt".

In March 2015, D&E's first Korean album, The Beat Goes On was released. Donghae participated in the album production, teaming up with producers Team One Sound in writing lyrics and composing two songs, the lead single "Growing Pains" and side single "Mother" .

In July 2015, Super Junior special album, Devil was released to celebrate the group's 10th anniversary. Donghae also participated in the album production with writing lyrics and composing two songs, "Don't Wake Me Up" and "Alright".

On September 2, 2015, S.M. Entertainment announced that Lee Donghae would enlist as a conscripted policeman on October 15, 2015. Donghae entered through the Nonsan Army Training Center in South Chungcheong Province on his birthday.

=== 2017–present: Returning to Super Junior and Super Junior Promotions ===
Donghae completed his military service on July 14, 2017, after serving for 21 months. Following the completion of his mandatory military service, he and fellow Super Junior member Eunhyuk, held a fan meeting for Super Junior-D&E Hello Again on July 23 at Sejong University Daeyang Hall and participated on SM Town Live World Tour VI in Japan on July 27–28.

On September 27, 2017, Super Junior's website began a countdown to November 6 — the date of their 12th anniversary — announcing it as their comeback date for their 8th album. SJ Returns, a reality show featuring the idol group's development of their album, began airing on October 9. Donghae participated in the album production of where he co-wrote with Eunhyuk and JDUB as well as co-composed with JDUB for a pre-release single "One More Chance." On October 30, 2017, the music video for "One More Chance" was released as a pre-release track for the upcoming album. On November 6, 2017, Super Junior's eighth album Play was released in honor of Super Junior's 12th anniversary.

In 2017, Donghae and Eunhyuk announced their comeback as the duo group Super Junior-D&E in Japan, where they would kick off a series of monthly release of Japanese singles by releasing one song every month starting November 2017, and by sometime later 2018, compile all the released singles into a full Japanese album. On November 29, they released the first Japanese single of the series, titled "Here We Are." One month later, on December 26, D&E released the second Japanese single titled "You don't go." On January 31, 2018, Super Junior-D&E released the third Japanese single titled "If You," written and composed by Donghae. On February 28, 2018, Super Junior-D&E's released the fourth Japanese single titled "Circus." On March 28, 2018, the duo continued their ongoing Japanese series, the fifth single, titled "Lose It." The music video was released in 3 episodes. The episodes were released on March 28, 2018, March 30, 2018, and April 1, 2018. On April 2, 2018, the full version of the music video was later released.

In December 2017, Donghae collaborated with Cadillac for the promotional single "Perfect", which he also co-wrote.

Due to the success of SJ Returns, in January 2018, Donghae and his fellow Super Junior members started a new variety program Super Junior's Super TV in which varied entertainment formats are re-created and twisted in Super Junior's own way. The first season was released with 12 episodes where Donghae gained the nickname '0-hae' due to his lack of variety skills.

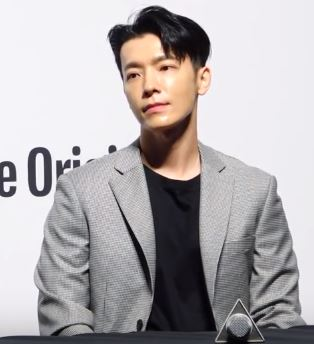
Donghae during Analog Trip press conference in September 2019.

In October 2022, Donghae was cast opposite Song Ha-yoon in the Genie TV romantic comedy series Oh! Youngsim, his first acting role since 2014.

On July 14, 2023, it was announced that Donghae, with his fellow band members Eunhyuk and Kyuhyun, had decided not to renew their contracts with SM, but will continue group activity for Super Junior with SM.

== Personal life ==
=== Military service ===
On September 2, 2015, SM Entertainment announced that Donghae would enlist as a conscripted policeman on October 15, 2015. Donghae entered through the Nonsan Army Training Center in South Chungcheong Province on his birthday. He was discharged on July 14, 2017.

== Discography ==
=== Studio albums ===
Title	Album details	Peak chart positions		Sales
Title	Album details	KOR	JPN	Sales
Alive	Released: April 20, 2026; Label: Arts & Artists, Universal Music; Formats: CD, digital download; Track listing: 1. "Alive (Skit)"; 2. "East Coast"; 3. "Good Day" (featuring Jay Park and 1iL); 4. "Haerise" (해 떴네); 5. "Race"; 6. "Help"; 7. "Rocket"; 8. "Goodbye" (featuring Tablo); 9. "Too Late"; 10. "Flower"; 11. "To You (Skit); 12. "HBD"; 13. "Beautiful"	6	16	KOR: 120,000; JPN: 3,008

=== Singles ===
Title	Year	Peak chart positions	Album
Title	Year	KOR	Album
"Happy Bubble" (with Kyuhyun, feat. Han Ji-min)	2009	—	Non-album single
"Jigeum Cheoreom" (with Ryeowook)	2010	—	It's Okay, Daddy's Girl OST Part. 3
"Gangsimjang" (with Chance of One Way)	2010	—	Strong Heart
"Only U" (with As One)	2011	—	Only U
"Dreams Come True" (with Seohyun)	2011	—	Asian Song Festival 2011 with UNICEF
"This Is Love" (這是愛) (with Henry)	2011	—	Skip Beat! OST
"Plz Don't"	2012	—	Miss Panda and Mr. Hedgehog OST Part. 1
"Gajima"	2012	—	Miss Panda and Mr. Hedgehog OST Part. 4
"Perfect" (Promotional single for Cadillac)	2017	—	Non-album single
"Sarang-ingabwa"	2018	—	Top Management OST
"Harmony" (feat. BewhY)	2020	96	Non-album single
"California Love" (feat. Jeno of NCT)	2021	179	Countdown (California Love ver.)
"Haerise" (해 떴네)	2026	157	Alive
"—" denotes releases that did not chart or were not released in that region.

=== Other appearances ===
List of non-single guest appearances, showing year released and album name
Title	Year	Album
"Spokes Man" (Yunho featuring Donghae)	2007	The 2nd Asia Tour Concert Album "O"
"My Everything"	2008	Super Show
"Beautiful"	2009	Super Show 2
"First Love" (Japanese version)	2013	Hero
"So Cold" (Studio ver.)	2015	Super Show 5
"Blue Moon" (feat. Miyeon of (G)I-dle)	2021	Countdown (California Love ver.)
"California Love" (Solo ver.)	2021	Countdown (California Love ver.)

== Tour ==
=== Alive (2026) ===
Tour dates
Date	City	Country	Venue
May 15	Seoul	South Korea	KBS Arena
May 16	Seoul	South Korea	KBS Arena
May 17	Seoul	South Korea	KBS Arena
May 29	Taipei	Taiwan	New Taipei City Exhibition Hall
May 30	Taipei	Taiwan	New Taipei City Exhibition Hall
May 31	Taipei	Taiwan	New Taipei City Exhibition Hall
June 27	Hong Kong	China	AsiaWorld–Expo Runway 11
June 28	Hong Kong	China	AsiaWorld–Expo Runway 11
July 4	Osaka	Japan	Grand Cube Osaka
July 5	Osaka	Japan	Grand Cube Osaka
July 18	Tokyo	Japan	Kanadevia Hall
July 19	Tokyo	Japan	Kanadevia Hall
July 20	Tokyo	Japan	Kanadevia Hall
July 25	Kaohsiung	Taiwan	Kaohsiung Music Center
August 15	Macau	China	Studio City Event Center
August 16	Macau	China	Studio City Event Center

== Filmography ==
=== Film ===
Year	Title	Role	Notes	Ref.
2007	Attack on the Pin-Up Boys	Ultra Junior member and Kibum's best friend		
2011	Super Show 3 3D	Himself		
2012	I AM.	Himself		
2013	Super Show 4 3D	Himself		
2014	The Youth aka The Rumor	Jung Woo		
TBA	You Belong Here	Hyun Soo / Jung Woo		

=== Television series ===
Year	Title	Role	Notes	Ref.
2009	Stage of Youth	Himself	Cameo (Episode 12)	
2010–2011	It's Okay, Daddy's Girl	Choi Wook-gi		
2011–2012	Skip Beat!	Shang Jie Yong / Bu Po Shang		
2012	Miss Panda and Mr. Hedgehog	Go Seung-ji		
2014	Quiz of God 4	Han Si-woo		
2023	Oh! Youngsim	Wang Kyung-tae / Mark Wang		
2023	Between Him and Her	Jung Hyun-seong		

=== Television shows ===
Year	Title	Role	Notes	Ref.
2007	Secret Reports Super Summer	Cast Member		
2011	2011 Chuseok Special Star Ae-eungchon	Cast Member	Chuseok Special	
2014	Super Junior's One Fine Day	Cast Member	On December 31, 2014	
2020–2021	Idol Challenge: Another Class	MC	Seasons 1, 2	

=== Web shows ===
Year	Title	Role	Notes	Ref.
2019	Analog Trip	Cast Member	A travel series, shot in Indonesia	
2021	Super Trip	Host	Travel show, with Leeteuk	
2023	Knight of the Lamp	Cast Member	with Leeteuk, Shindong, Eunhyuk, Ryeowook and Kyuhyun	

== Awards and nominations ==
Year	Award	Category	Nominated work	Result
2013	Singapore e-Awards 2013	Most Popular Korean Actor	Lee Donghae	Won
2021	The Fact Music Awards	Fan & Star Choice Award (Artist)	Lee Donghae	Nominated
