= List of songs recorded by Super Junior =

Songs recorded by South Korean boyband, Super Junior

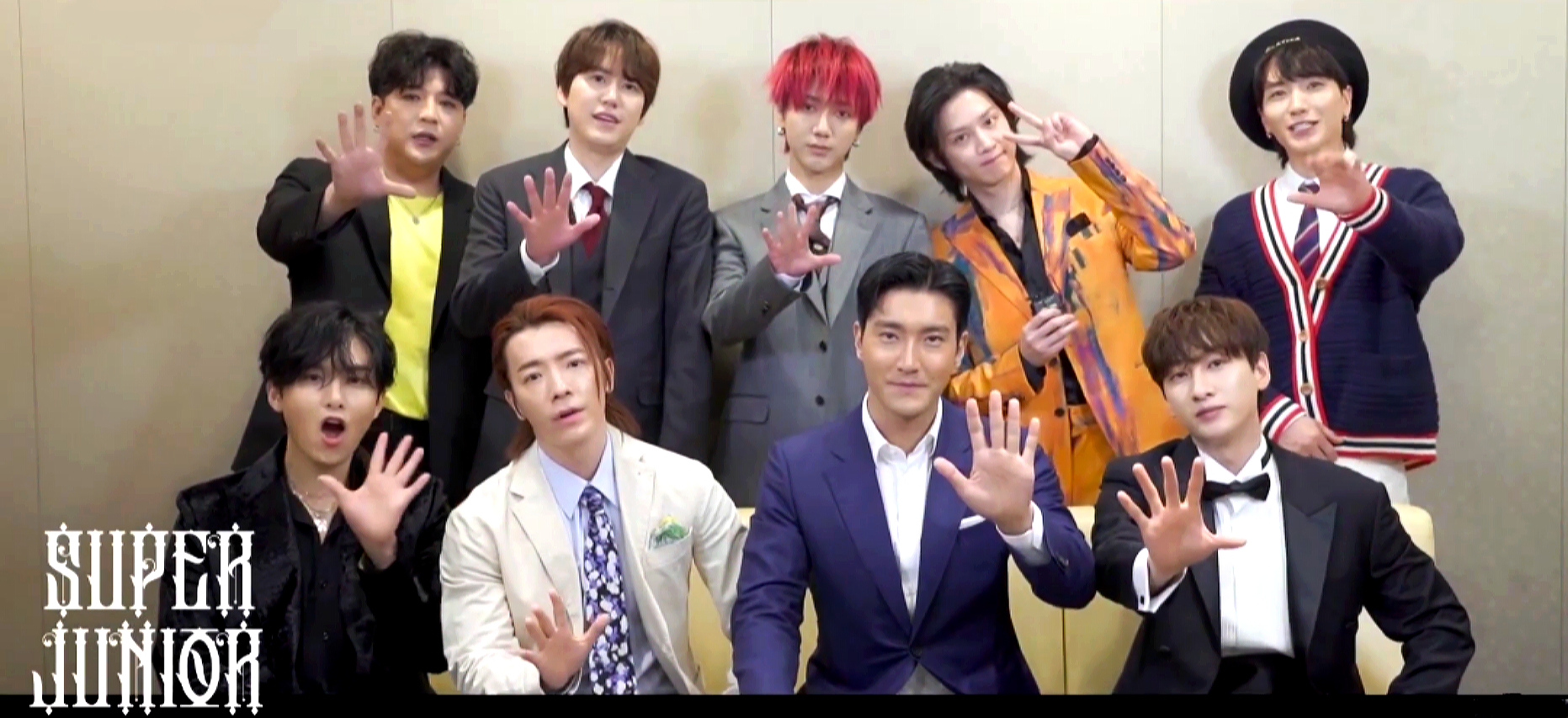
Members of Super Junior in 2021. Clockwise, standing from left: Shindong, Kyuhyun, Yesung, Heechul, Leeteuk, Eunhyuk, Siwon, Donghae, Ryeowook

Super Junior is a South Korean boy band which was formed in 2005 by the label SM Entertainment. They debuted under the name Super Junior 05 and was originally meant to be a band with rotational line-ups. Originally consist of twelve members; Leeteuk, Heechul, Han Geng, Yesung, Kangin, Shindong, Siwon, Sungmin, Eunhyuk, Donghae, Kibum and Ryeowook, the band changed its name permanently to Super Junior after the addition of final member Kyuhyun in 2006. As a large band, they uses the concept "separately and together" in their musical activities by forming subgroups which focuses on different genres; Super Junior-K.R.Y. which focuses on Korean ballad in 2006, Super Junior-T in 2007 which focuses on Trot, Super Junior-Happy in 2008, Super Junior-M with two unit-exclusive members Henry and Zhou Mi in 2008 which focuses on the Chinese Market, Super Junior-D&E in 2011, and Super Junior-L.S.S. in 2022. The band also performed in the musical assemble SM Town, which consists of signed artists under SM Entertainment. As of 2021, the band has nine active members.

They, as a full group has recorded materials in Korean, Japanese, Chinese and Spanish for their eleven studio albums. They had further released four studio albums under their subunits; Me (2008) and Break Down (2013) as Super Junior-M, and Ride Me (2014) and Style (2018) as Super Junior-D&E. Some of their earlier work, namely their first album, Twins (2005), the collaboration single with labelmate TVXQ, "Show Me Your Love" (2005) and their first single album, U, were released under the name Super Junior 05. The band's first seven Korean albums; Twins (2005), Don't Don (2008), Sorry, Sorry (2009), Bonamana (2010), Mr. Simple (2011), Sexy, Free & Single (2012), Mamacita (2014), and the compilation album Devil (2015) were released under the label SM Entertainment and produced by Lee Soo-man, while their sole Japanese album, Hero (2013) was released under Avex Trax in Japan.

On the band's 10th anniversary in 2015, the band's management were moved to the subsidiary label Label SJ. However, they did not release any material with the new management before going on hiatus in 2016 and most of 2017 due to most of the band members were fulfilling their mandatory military services. In late 2017, they released Play, their first self-produced album. They further released Time Slip (2019), Star (2021), a Japanese compilation album, The Renaissance (2021) and The Road: Winter for Spring (2022), their second single album.

Super Junior did not have any signature musical style, instead they had explore many genres in their long career. In 2018, they released "Lo Siento", a Latin-pop single featuring Leslie Grace which was sung in three language; Korean, Spanish and English. The song, a first of its kind, made them the first Korean artist to chart of Billboard Latin Digital Song Sales chart. The band had worked closedly with songwriter Yoo Young-jin who had written most of their Korean lead singles, notably the three title tracks known collectively as "SJ Funky" songs, "Sorry, Sorry" (2009), "Bonamana" (2010) and "Mr. Simple" (2011). The songs are considered as flagships K-pop songs, and has been covered by numerous artists. Super Junior had worked with many other songwriters such as Kenzie, Zico, Teddy Riley and One Way. They had also participate in writing some of their own songs.

Songs included in this list are from their studio albums, compilation albums, extended plays, single albums, live albums, and collaboration with other recording artists. Many of them were released as singles and have been successful both in South Korea and in international markets. Also included in this list are songs that were registered under their name in Korea Music Copyright Association (KOMCA) but were never officially released. This list is also inclusive of solo work released as tracks in the band's album.

== Released songs ==
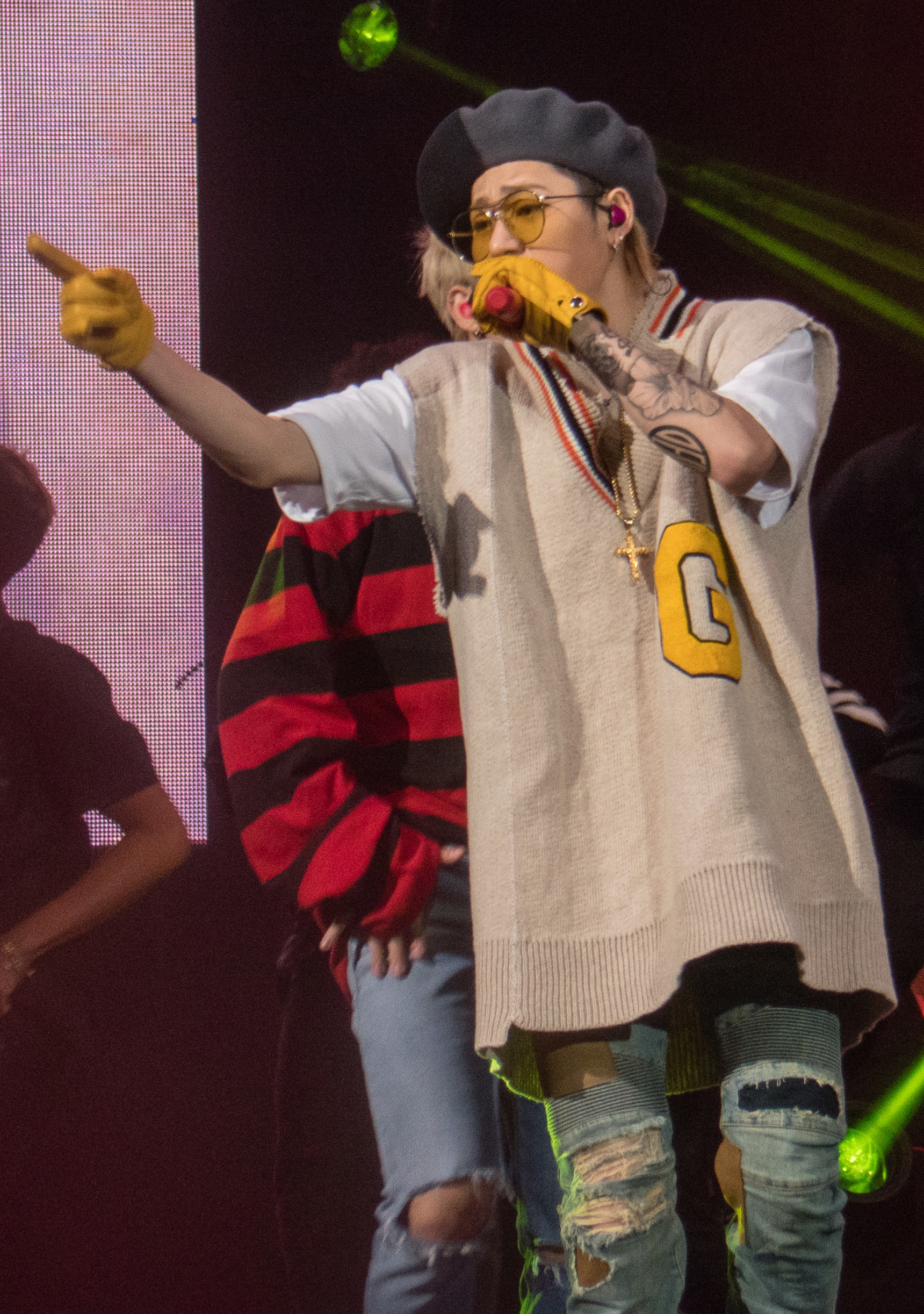
Zico co-wrote "2YA2YAO!" from Timeless

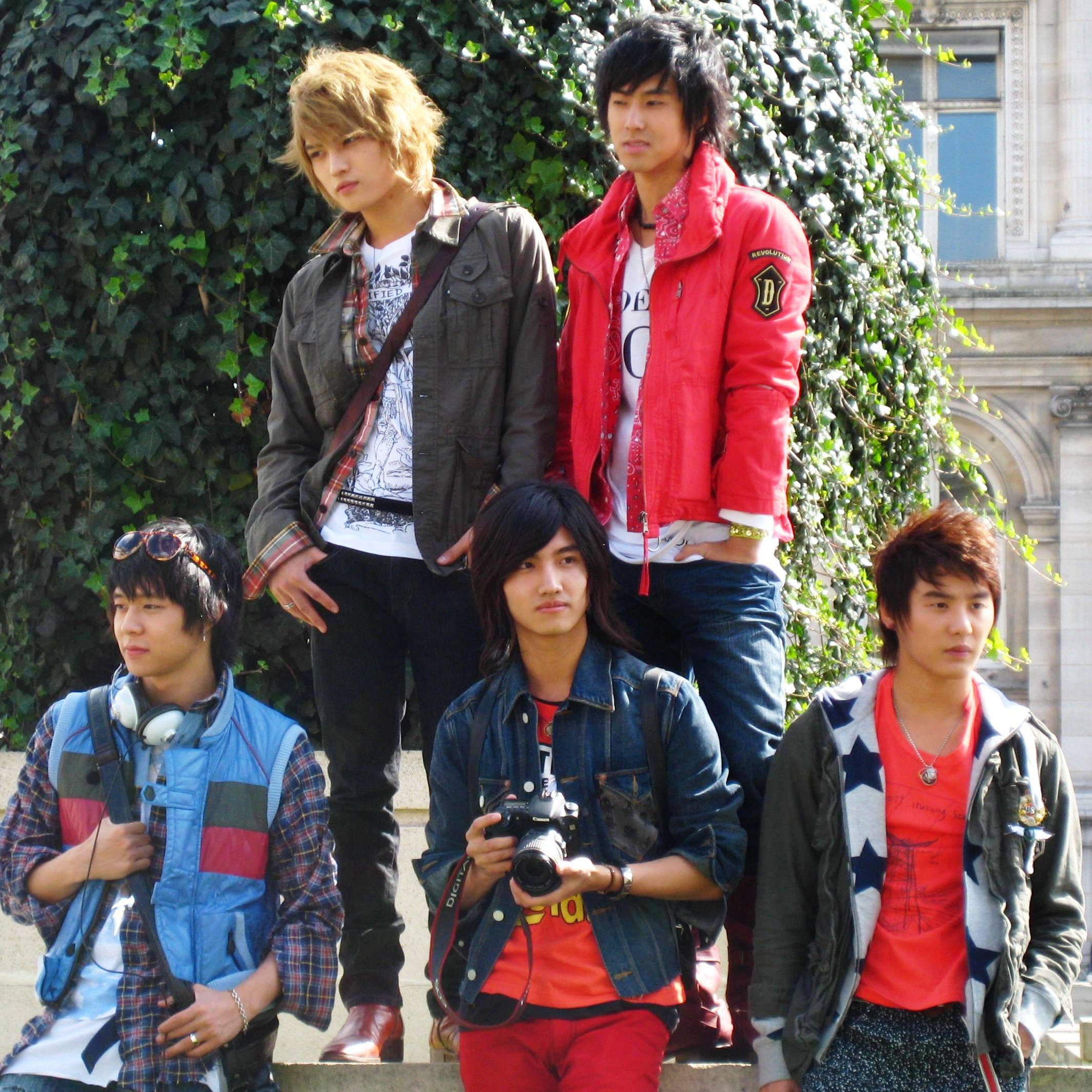
TVXQ collaborated with Super Junior on "Show Me Your Love" and "Magical"

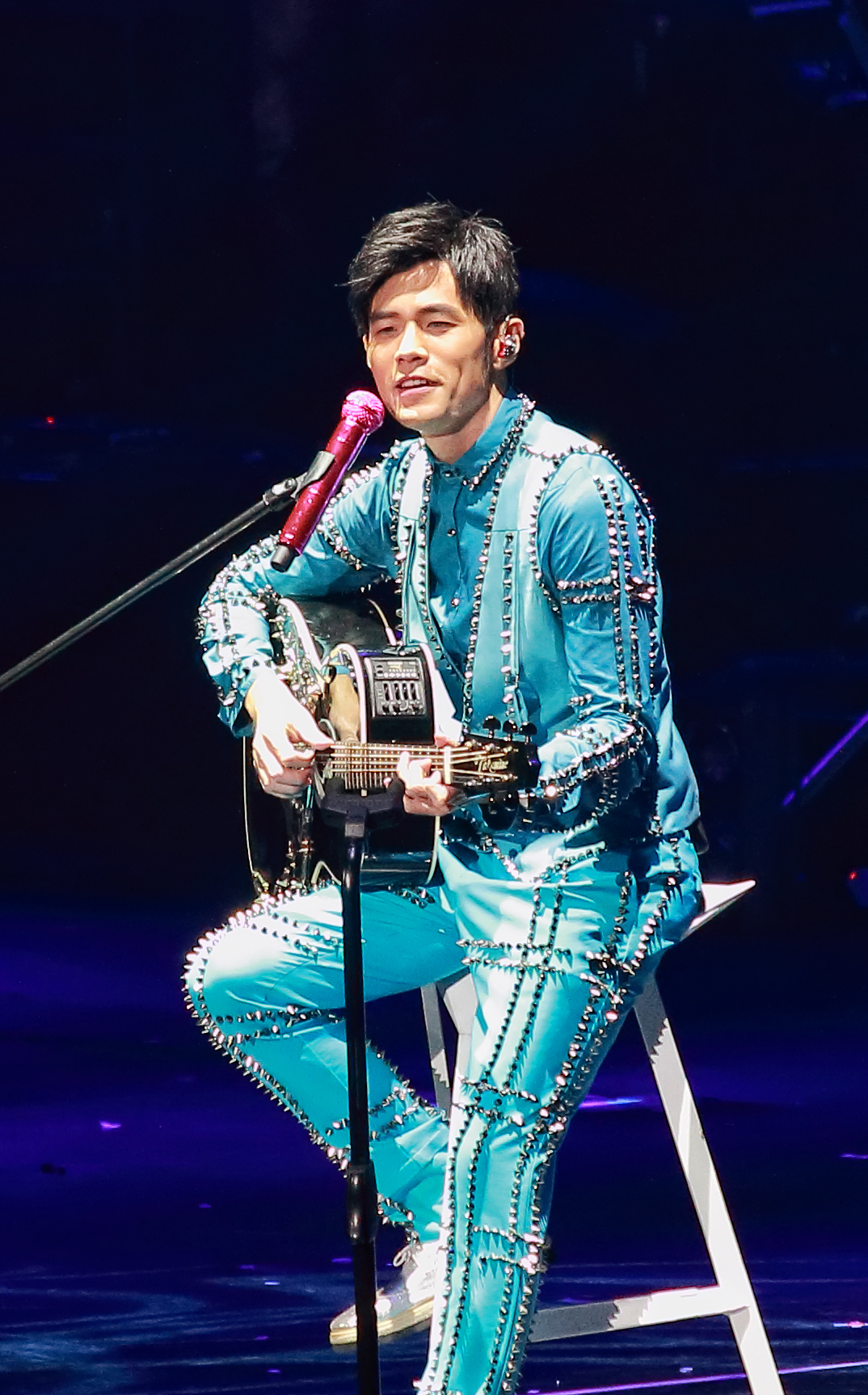
Jay Chou co-wrote "Xìngfú Wēi Tián (Love Is Sweet)" from Perfection

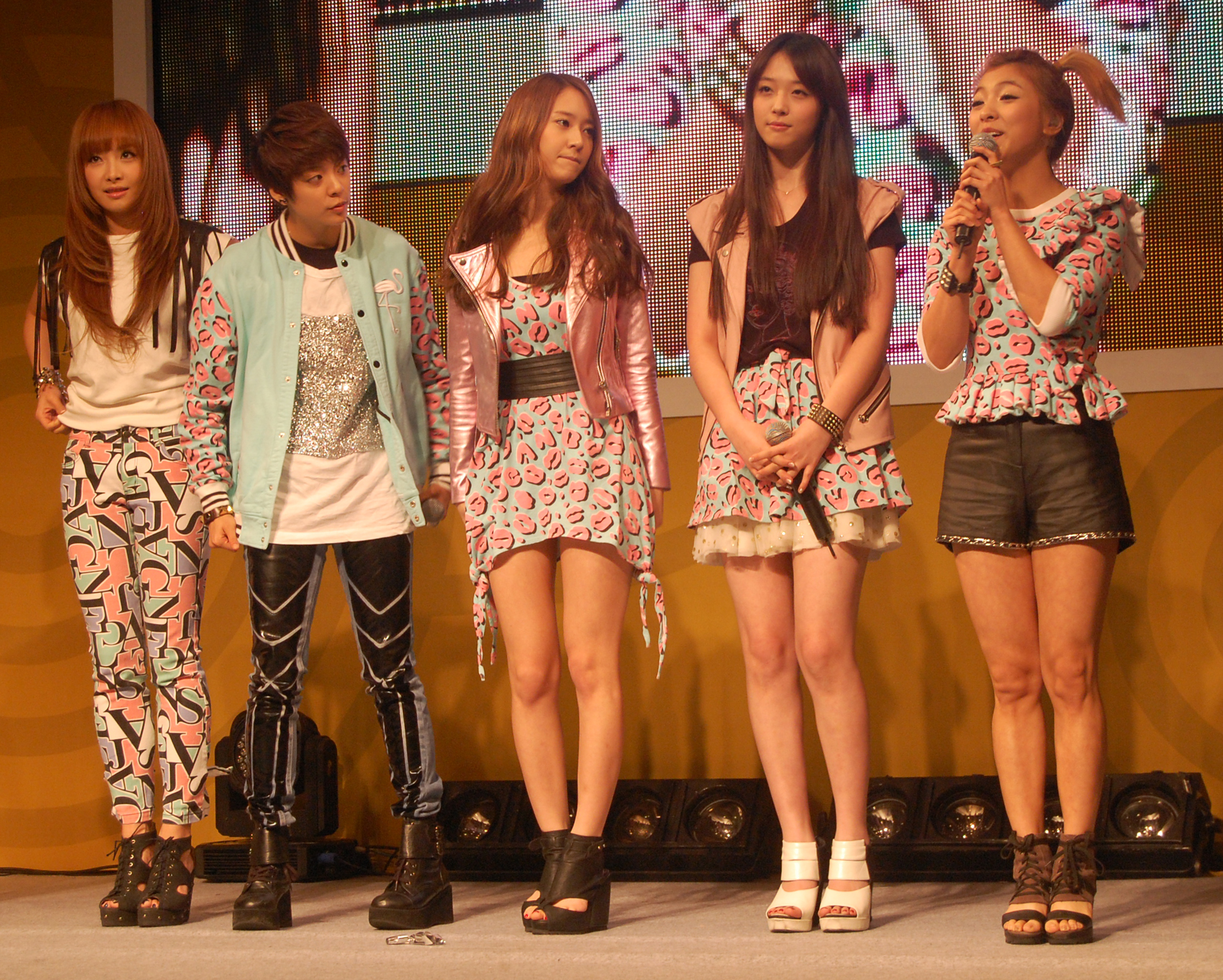
f(x) appears as featured artist on "Oops!!" from A-Cha

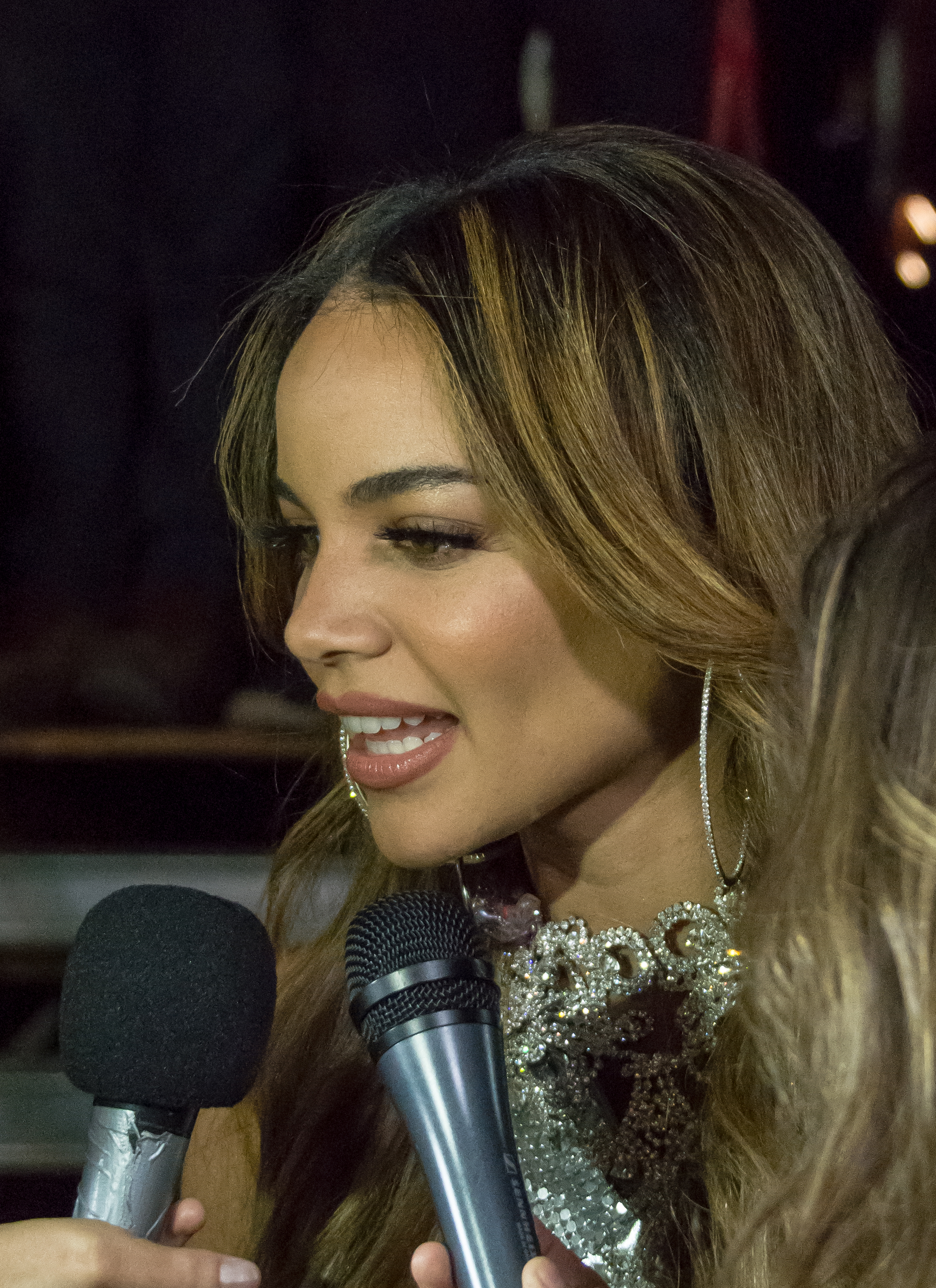
Leslie Grace co-wrote and appears as featured artist on "Lo Siento" from Play

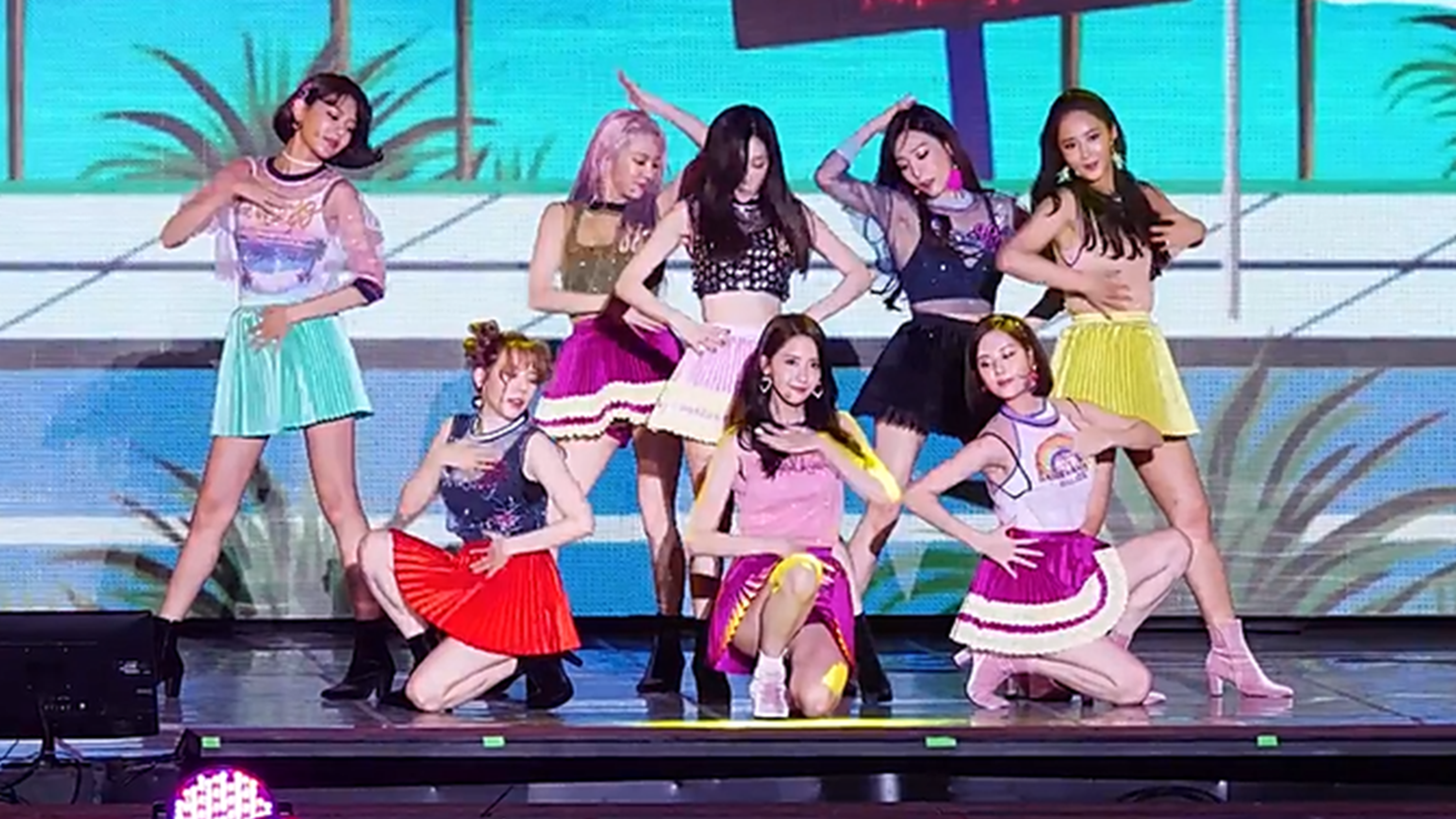
Girls' Generation collaborated with Super Junior on the promotional single "SEOUL"

Key
†	Indicates songs that were released as singles
‡	Indicates songs that were partially written by the band members
Indicates songs that were entirely written by the band members	Indicates songs that were entirely written by the band members

Name of song, featured performers, writers, originating album, language of song and year released.
Title (Note: Song titles which use Korean, Japanese or Chinese characters are written in revised romanization, Hepburn or Hanyu Pinyin, respectively)	Artist(s)	Writer(s)	Album	Language	Year	Ref.
"1+1=Love"	Super Junior-D&E	Donghae; Team One Sound; ‡	The Beat Goes On (Special edition)	Korean	2015	
"2YA2YAO!"† (Note: Korean pronunciation: [ijaijao])	Super Junior	Zico; Dem Jointz; Pop Time	Timeless	Korean	2020	
24Lovers	Super Junior-D&E	Carlos K; KAIKI	YOU&ME	Japanese	2024	
"A-Cha"†	Super Junior	Kim Bu-min; hitchhiker	A-Cha	Korean	2011	
"A-Cha" (Japanese ver.)	Super Junior	Leonn; hitchhiker	Hero	Japanese	2013	
"A-Oh!"	Super Junior-M	Tina Wang; Sean Alexander; The Euroz	Break Down	Chinese	2013	
"A-Oh!" (Korean ver.) (Studio ver.)	Super Junior	Lee Seu-ran; Alexander Sean Michael; Nadir Benkahla; Saeed Molavi	Super Show 5 – Super Junior World Tour Concert Album	Korean	2015	
"Addiction (Rùmí)"	Super Junior-M	Tina Wang; Jaakko Salovaara; Tommy Park; Casper; 220	Swing	Chinese	2014	
"Aenjella (Angela)"	Super Junior	Kim Jung-bae; Kenzie	Sorry, Sorry	Korean	2009	
"Ahora Te Puedes Marchar"	Super Junior	Mike Hawker; Ivor Raymonde; Luis Gómez-Escolar	One More Time	Spanish	2018	
"Ai Ga Oshiete Kureta Koto"	Super Junior	Natsumi Kobayashi; Donghae; J-DUB; ‡	I Think U	Japanese	2020	
"Ai Taeuda (Shadowless)"	Super Junior-K.R.Y.	Seo Ji-eum; Hwang Chan-hee; PJT; S2REN	Pause	Korean	2017	
"Ainiaini"	Super Junior-M	Lee Jae-myeong	Me	Korean	2008	
"Ajikdo Nan (Still You)"†	Donghae & Eunhyuk	Donghae; Team One Sound; ‡	The Beat Goes On (Special edition)	Korean	2013	
"Aju Meon Yennal (Song For You)"	Super Junior	Chun Tae-hyuk; Jinyong	Don't Don	Korean	2007	
"Alright"	Super Junior	Donghae; Eunhyuk; Team One Sound; ‡	Devil	Korean	2015	
"Always"	Super Junior	U1 (153/Joombas); Yi Yi-jin; Eunhyuk; l.vin (153/Joombas); NEUL; ‡	The Road: Keep on Going	Korean	2022	
"Ame Nochi Hare no Sora no Iro"	Yesung	Hajime Watanabe; Choi Hee-jun; Hwang Seung-chan; Yesung; ‡	Star	Japanese	2021	
"Anajulge (Hug)"	Super Junior	Yesung; Min Yeon-jae; Phenomenote; Kwon Doctor; ‡	Replay	Korean	2018	
"Analogue Radio"	Super Junior	KYUM LYK; Baek LYK; Jo Yoon-kyung	The Road: Winter for Spring	Korean	2022	
"Andante (Andante)"	Super Junior	Misfit; Leeteuk; Henry Lau; Kim Kyu-won; ‡	A-Cha	Korean	2011	
"Android Syndrome"	Donghae & Eunhyuk	Sara Sakurai; Neil Athale; Gustav Efraimsson; Mr. Success	Ride Me	Japanese	2014	
"Angel"†	Super Junior	Oh Jun-sung; Eun Jong-tae	Haru OST	Korean	2010	
"Angel" (Ballad ver.)	Super Junior	Oh Jun-sung; Eun Jong-tae	Haru OST	Korean	2010	
"Angmong (Ticky Tocky)"	Super Junior	Hwang Yoo-bin; Jihad Rahmouni; Deez; Gregory G. Curtis II	Timeless	Korean	2020	
"Animals"†	Super Junior	Chun Song-yi; Anton Dahlrot; Gionata Caracciolo	One More Time	Korean	2018	
"Ashita no Tameni"	Sungmin	c.close	non-album song (Note: Side track for the single"Rock & Go")	Japanese	2008	
"Ashita no Tameni"	Sungmin ft. Moeyan	c.close	Hero	Japanese	2008	
"Ayumio Tomete"	Super Junior-KRY	Kim Jin-ah; Park Jun-su	non-album song (Note: Side track for the promotional single "Marry U")	Japanese	2008	
"Ài Nǐ Ài Nǐ (Love Song)"	Super Junior-M	Zhou Mi; Lee Jae-myeong; ‡	Me	Chinese	2008	
"Àiqíng Jiēlì (You And Me)"	Super Junior-M	Zhou Mi; Lee Jae-myeong; ‡	Super Girl	Chinese	2009	
"B.A.D"†	Super Junior-D&E	Donghae; J-DUB; ‡	Bad Blood	Korean	2020	
"B.A.D" (Japanese ver.)	Super Junior-D&E	Hasegawa; Donghae; J-DUB; ‡	non-album song (Note: B-side track for the single "Wings")	Japanese	2020	
"Baegilmong (Evanesce)"†	Super Junior	Misfit; DOM; Kim Tae-sung; Andrew Choi; Teddy Riley	Mamacita	Korean	2014	
"Baegya (Baegya) (Evanesce II)"	Super Junior-D&E	Cho Yoon-kyung; Jang Yeo-jin; Nam Ja-hyun; Song Suh-ho; Cho Seung-youn	'Bout You	Korean	2018	
"BAMBINA" (Note: stylized as "★BAMBINA★")	Super Junior	Sara Sakurai; Andreas Carlsson; Erik Lidbom	Hero	Japanese	2013	
"Bari 5!"	Donghae & Eunhyuk	H.U.B.; Warren David Meyers; Matthew Oscar Meyers; Daniel Thomas Boots; Ian Simpson	Ride Me	Japanese	2014	
"be"†	Eunhyuk	Eunhyuk; Aton Ben-Horin; Christopher Ganoudis; Connor McDonough; Riley McDonough; Rodnae "Chikk" Bell; Ryan Jhun; ‡	Countdown (be version)	Korean	2021	
"Beautiful Liar"	Super Junior-D&E	Zaya; Hyuk Shin; JOONY; JJ Evans	Countdown	Korean	2021	
"Beautiful Star"	Super Junior-D&E	SHOW; Wolf Kid	YOU&ME	Japanese	2024	
"Because I Love You ~Taisetsuna Kizuna~"	Yesung	Yesung; h.toyosaki; Phenomenotes; ‡	Star	Japanese	2019	
"Believe"	Super Junior 05	Seiko Nagaoka; Heechul; ‡	Twins	Korean	2005	
"Bijin (Bonamana)"†	Super Junior	Goro Matsui; Yoo Young-jin	Hero	Japanese	2011	
"Biǎo Bái (Off My Mind)"	Henry Lau	Henry Lau; Gen Neo; Aalias; "Ryghteous Ryan" Tedder; Feleke Ross; DM; ‡	Perfection	Chinese	2011	
"Bicheoreom Gaji Mayo (One More Chance)"†	Super Junior	Donghae; J-DUB; Eunhyuk; ‡	Play	Korean	2017	
"Bit"†	Choi Bool-am, Yang Hee-eun, Kim Jang-hoon, Kim Jong-seo, JK Kim Dong-wook, Lim Jeong-hee, Jeon Je-deok, Big Mama, No Brain, Super Junior, Girls' Generation, Defconn, and Crown J	Kim Jong-seo	Bit (Note: Charity album)	Korean	2007	
"Bit (Hope from Kwangya)"†	SM Town	Kangta	2021 Winter SM Town: SMCU Express	Korean	2021	
"Black Suit"†	Super Junior	Lee Seu-ran; Jo Yoon-kyung; Oh Min-joo; Im Jung-hyo; ESBEE; Martin Hoberg Hedegaard; Coach & Sendo	Play	Korean	2017	
"Black Suit"	Super Junior	MEG.ME; Martin Hoberg Hedegaard; Coach & Sendo	Star	Japanese	2017	
"BLUE"	Super Junior	Young Sky; HASEGAWA; Leeteuk; ‡	I Think U	Japanese	2020	
"Blue Moon"	Donghae ft. Miyeon of (G)I-dle	Donghae; J-DUB; 1iL; G-high; One Star	Countdown (California Love version)	Korean	2021	
"Blue World"†	Super Junior	Amon Hayashi; Stephan Elfgren; Anders Wigelius	Star	Japanese	2013	
"Boku no Majimena Rabu Komedī"	Kyuhyun	Hidenori Tanaka	Star	Japanese	2017	
"Bokurano Story"†	Super Junior-D&E	Donghae; Eunhyuk; Kim Jun-tae; Lee Jae-jun; jelly; 17; ‡	Bokurano Story	Japanese	2024	
"Bomnal (One Fine Spring Day)"	Ryeowook	Kwon Yoon-jung; Magnus Andersson	Bonamana	Korean	2010	
"Break"	Super Junior-D&E	Donghae; ROKSTAXIL; Kim Jun-tae; 17; jelly; ‡	Inevitable	Korean	2024	
"Break Down"†	Super Junior-M	Zhou Weijie; Twice As Nice; Martin Mullohand; Nermin Harambasic	Break Down	Chinese	2013	
"Break Down" (Korean ver.)	Super Junior-M	Seo Ji-eum; Lee Seu-ran; Lee Hyo-min; Twice As Nice; Martin Mullohand; Nermin Harambasic	Break Down (Korean edition)	Korean	2013	
"Breaking Up"	Super Junior-D&E	Goo Tae-woo; Ryan S. Jhun; Denzil "IDR" Remedios; Antwann Frost	The Beat Goes On	Korean	2015	
"Burn The Floor"	Super Junior	Cho Yoon-kyung; Jisoo Park; 153CreatorsClub; Blair Taylor; Jake K	The Renaissance	Korean	2021	
"Busane Gamyeon (Way To Busan)"	Super Junior-K.R.Y.	Zeenan; OneTop; Oh Seung-eun	When We Were Us	Korean	2020	
"Byeori Tteunda (Stars Appear...)"	Super Junior	Epitone Project	Devil	Korean	2015	
"Byeorui Donghwa (Midnight Story)"	Super Junior-K.R.Y.	4Beontaja	When We Were Us	Korean	2020	
"C'mon (Jilreo)"†	Super Junior-L.S.S.	Leeteuk; KINSHA; OneWay; ‡	C'MON	Korean	2024	
"California Love"†	Donghae ft. Jeno of NCT	Donghae; J-DUB; ‡	Countdown (California Love version)	Korean	2021	
"California Love" (Solo ver.)	Donghae	Donghae; J-DUB; ‡	Countdown (California Love version)	Korean	2021	
"Callin'"†	Super Junior	Kenzie	The Road: Winter for Spring	Korean	2022	
"Can I Stay..."†	Super Junior-D&E	h.toyosaki; Justin Reinstein	Style	Japanese	2018	
"Candy"	Super Junior	AKIRA; DAICHII; Robin Ericsson; Jin Choi	non-album song (Note: B-side track for the single "Blue World")	Japanese	2013	
"Celebrate"†	Super Junior	Kang Eun-jeong; Henrik Nordenback; Christian Fast; Gabriel Brandes	The Road: Celebration	Korean	2022	
"Celebration ～Kimini Kakeru Hashi～"	Kyuhyun	SHIKATA; SKY BEATZ; Mats Lie Skare	Star	Japanese	2016	
"CEREMONY" †	Super Junior-L.S.S.	Oneway; Leeteuk; Masaki Fujiwara	Let's Standing Show	Japanese	2023	
"Chageunchageun (Way For Love)"	Super Junior 05	Lee Yoon-jae	Twins	Korean	2005	
"Champagne Girl"	Donghae & Eunhyuk	Sara Sakurai; Ricky Henley; Daniel Sherman	Ride Me	Japanese	2014	
"Change (Byeon Hwa)"	Super Junior-D&E	OUOW2	Bad Blood	Korean	2020	
"Cheonnune Banhaetsumnida (Love at First Sight)"	Super Junior-T	Kang Jun-woo	Devil	Korean	2015	
"Cheotbeonjjae Iyagi (Love U More)"	Super Junior	Sungmin; Ryeowook	Sorry, Sorry (Version C)	Korean	2009	
"Cheotcha"	Super Junior-T ft. Bang Silyi	Shin Sang-ho	Rokkugo	Korean	2007	
"Cheotsarang (First Love)"	Super Junior-D&E	Peter Hyun; Eunhyuk; Donghae; ‡	Oppa, Oppa	Korean	2011	
"Chogi Wa (Can You Feel It)"	Super Junior-D&E	Lee Yoo-jin; Team One Sound; January 8th; Will Simms; Martin Mullholland; Nermin Harambasic	The Beat Goes On	Korean	2015	
"Chonnuni Wa (First Snow)"	Super Junior	Kim Jung-bae; Kenzie	07 Winter SM Town	Korean	2007	
"Chou Pureshā"	Super Junior-D&E	SHIROSE; Command Freaks; Casper	Present	Japanese	2015	
"Chuī Yíyàng De Fēng" (Note: Chinese remake of "Sarangi Ireoke (My All Is In You)")	Super Junior-M	Zhou Weijie; Luther "Squeak" Jackson; Stephen Beckham	Perfection	Chinese	2011	
"Chumeul Chunda (Midnight Blues)"	Super Junior	Shin Jin-hye; Lee Yoo-jin; Jason Gill; Curtis Richa; Emanuel Olsson	Mamacita	Korean	2014	
"Circus"†	Super Junior-D&E	Ibuki Sakai; Kyler Niko; Scott Stoddart	Style	Japanese	2018	
"Closer"	Super Junior	Shin Agnes; Sam Merriefield; Daniel Schulz; Daniel Davidsen; Peter Wallevik	The Renaissance	Korean	2021	
"Club No. 1"	Super Junior ft. Lee Yeon-hee	Choi Gap-won; Gabe Lopez; Angela Peel	Sorry, Sorry	Korean	2009	
"Coming Home"	Leeteuk	Hajime Watanabe; Leeteuk; Peter Hyun; ‡	Star	Japanese	2021	
"Contact"	Super Junior-D&E	Lim Soo-ran; Lee Hyo-jae; Alexandra Veltri; Gabe Reali; Peder Etholm Idsoe	Bad Blood	Korean	2020	
"Dalkomsseupsseul (Bittersweet)"	Super Junior	Kim Jung-bae; Kenzie	Sexy, Free & Single	Korean	2012	
"Dancing Out"†	Super Junior	Taehoon; Fredrick Willstrand; Daniel Pandher; Svein Finnheide	2006 Summer SM Town	Korean	2006	
"Dào Le Mìngtiān (Blue Tomorrow)"†	Super Junior-M	Ma Zhi Yong; Park Ki-won	Super Girl	Chinese	2009	
"Dear My Family"†	SM Town	Yoo Young-jin; Yoo Chang-yong; Yoo Han-jin	I AM. OST	Korean	2012	
"Devil"†	Super Junior	Kenzie; The Stereotypes; Micah Powell	Devil	Korean	2015	
"Devil"†	Super Junior	Amon Hayashi; Kenzie; The Stereotypes; Micah Powell	Star	Japanese	2016	
"Disco Drive"	Super Junior	Yoon Jong-shin; Lee Keun-ho	Don't Don	Korean	2007	
"Don Don! (Don't Don)"†	Super Junior	Yoo Young-jin; Kim Sung-soo	Don't Don	Korean	2007	
"Don Don! (Don't Don)" (Rearranged) (Studio ver.)	Super Junior	Yoo Young-jin; Kim Sung-soo	Super Show 3 – The 3rd Asia Tour Concert Album	Korean	2011	
"Don't Don"	Super Junior-M	Qi Cheng; Yoo Young-jin	Me	Chinese	2008	
"Don't Leave Me"	Super Junior	Siwon; Iconic Sounds; 220; ‡	This Is Love	Korean	2014	
"Don't Wait"†	Super Junior	Lee Joo-hyun (153/Joombas); Andreas Moe; Freddie Liljegren; Henrik Moreborg	The Road: Keep on Going	Korean	2022	
"Don't Wake Me Up"	Super Junior-D&E	Donghae; Team One Sound; ‡	Devil	Korean	2015	
"Dongsinigie"	Super Junior-M	Davy Chan	Me	Korean	2008	
"Dorosi (Dorothy)"	Super Junior-K.R.Y.	Kim Jin-ah; Lee Sang-jun	Magic	Korean	2015	
"Dòngqíng (Only U)"	Super Junior-M	Huang De Jiang; Karen Poole; Greg Kurstin	Super Girl	Chinese	2009	
"Dreamer"	Super Junior-D&E	Eunhyuk; Ji Ye-won; The Aristocrats; Kim Tae-sung; Zac Poor; ‡	Danger	Korean	2019	
"Du Beonjjae Gobaek (I Do)"	Super Junior	Yoda; Min Yeon-jae; 1wol 8il; Heechul; Shin Hyuk; Jeff Lewis; Bae Min-soo; Sun; Mrey; ‡	Play	Korean	2017	
"Duri (You&I)"	Super Junior-Happy	Jin Sung; Ahn Eun-jin; Kwon Hyuk-sung; Lee Hee-sung	Cooking? Cooking!	Korean	2008	
"Eau De Perfume"	Super Junior-D&E	Yoo Eun-mi; Shin Kong; VINCENZO; Forever Noh; Jinho	Inevitable	Korean	2024	
"Endless Moment"	Super Junior	Cho Yoon-kyung; Elin Wrethov; Anders Wrethov	U	Korean	2006	
"Eoneusae Urin (Good Friends)"	Super Junior	Yoon Jong-shin	Mr. Simple	Korean	2011	
"Eongttunghan Sangsang (White Christmas)"	Super Junior	hitchhiker	Mr. Simple	Korean	2011	
"Eonjenganeun (Someday)"	Super Junior	Lee Sang-eun; Ahn Jin-woo	Sexy, Free & Single	Korean	2012	
"Eunggyeol (Coagulation)"	Super Junior-K.R.Y.	Park Chang-hyun	Bonamana	Korean	2010	
"Everyday"	Super Junior	Jeon Won-kyo (JamFactory); JeL; John Mars	The Road: Keep on Going	Korean	2022	
"Fēixiáng (Fly High)"	Super Junior-M	Zhou Mi; Sean Alexander; Beau Evans; ‡	Swing	Chinese	2014	
"First Love" (Japanese ver.)	Donghae	Goro Matsui; Peter Hyun; Donghae; ‡	Hero	Japanese	2012	
"First Love" (Korean ver.)	Donghae & Eunhyuk	Donghae; Peter Hyun; ‡	non-album song (Note: Side track for the Japanese single "Oppa, Oppa")	Korean	2012	
"Fly"†	Super Junior-K.R.Y.	Park Keun-tae	Superstar K 3	Korean	2011	
"Fly To The Moon"	Super Junior	Rie Tsukagoshi; Chris Meyer; Dani Paz; Aleks Wann	I Think U	Japanese	2020	
"Gachigeoreulkka (More Days With You)"	Super Junior	Hwang-Yoo-bin; Young Chance; Voradory	The Renaissance	Korean	2021	
"Galjeung (A Man In Love)" (Original ver.)	Super Junior	Yoo Young-jin	Don't Don (Repackaged edition)	Korean	2007	
"Galjeung (A Man In Love)" (Remix ver.)	Super Junior	Yoo Young-jin	Don't Don (Repackaged edition)	Korean	2007	
"Game"	Super Junior	ZNEE; Jung Ku-ru; Kim Ji-soo; Heechul; Eunhyuk; Davey Nate; ROVIN; ‡	Time Slip	Korean	2019	
"Gangsimjang (Strong Heart)"†	Super Junior	Donghae	SBS Strong Heart Logo Song	Korean	2010	
"Gàobái (Confession)"	Super Junior-M	Zhou Mi; Lee Jae-myeong; ‡	Super Girl	Chinese	2009	
"Geollibeo (Gulliver)"	Super Junior	Eunhyuk; Markus Bøgelund; Søren Juhl Holmager; Mick Muxoll Rasmussen; ‡	Sexy, Free & Single	Korean	2012	
"Georeumeul Momchugo"†	Super Junior-K.R.Y.	Kim Jin-ah; Park Jun-soo	Snow Flower OST	Korean	2006	
"Geoul (Mirror)"	Super Junior	Cho Yoon-jung	Don't Don	Korean	2007	
"Gesshoku -Lunar Eclipse-"	Super Junior	Hidenori Tanaka; Kenzie	non-album song (Note: B-side track for the single "Mamacita -Ayaya-")	Japanese	2014	
"Geugotppunieyo (Just You)"	Super Junior-K.R.Y.	Kenzie	2006 Winter SM Town–Snow Dream	Korean	2006	
"Geunyeoneun Wiheomhae (She Wants It)"	Super Junior	Sean Alexander; Jimmy Andrew Richard; Kim Young-hoo; Gabriel Steve Lopez; Michael Edward Synder	Sorry, Sorry (Version C)	Korean	2009	
"Geurimja Sarang (Shadow of You)"	Super Junior-K.R.Y.	Han Seong-ho; Lee Hyun-seung; TM	The King's Affection OST	Korean	2021	
"Gidae (Home)"	Super Junior-K.R.Y.	Son Ko-eun	When We Were Us	Korean	2020	
"Gieogeul Ttara (Memories)"	Super Junior	Park Jun-soo; Lee Yoon-jong	Mr. Simple	Korean	2011	
"GIFT"	Super Junior-D&E	Sara Sakurai; Sky Beatz; Fast Lane; Andrew Choi; 220	Present	Japanese	2015	
"Go"	Super Junior-M	Zhou Mi; NoizeBank; ‡	Break Down	Chinese	2013	
"Go" (Korean ver.) (Studio ver.)	Super Junior	Henry Lau; Lee Hyo-min; Zhou Mi; Han Ha-gyeong; Nallas Niel; Gen Rong Neo; ‡	Super Show 5 – Super Junior World Tour Concert Album	Korean	2015	
"Go High"†	Super Junior-D&E	Donghae; ROKSTAXIL; ‡	Inevitable	Korean	2024	
"Gongjeon (Mìngyùn Xiān: Destiny)" (Korean ver.) (Studio ver.)	Super Junior	Kim Jin-hwan	Super Show 4 – Super Junior World Tour Concert Album	Korean	2013	
"Good Day For A Good Day"	Super Junior	Jo Yoon-kyung; Park Sung-hee; Eunhyuk; Didrik Thott; Josef Melin; Chris Meyer; ‡	Play	Korean	2017	
"Good Love"	Super Junior	Kenzie; The Stereotypes; Micah Powell	Devil	Korean	2015	
"Growing Pains"†	Super Junior-D&E	Sara Sakurai; Donghae; Team One Sound; ‡	Present	Japanese	2015	
"Gyeoltu (Feels Good)"	Super Junior	Hong Ji-you; Denniz Jamm; Qwan	Mr. Simple	Korean	2011	
"Haebaragi (Sunflower)"	Super Junior	Hong Ji-you; Brandon Fraley	Mr. Simple	Korean	2011	
"Haengbok"†	Super Junior	Jang Yong-jin	2007 Summer SM Town–Fragile	Korean	2007	
"Hal Su Eomneun Il (I Can't)"	Super Junior-K.R.Y.	Youngjun; Jeon Hong-joon	When We Were Us	Korean	2020	
"Han Sarammaneul (The One I Love)"	Super Junior-K.R.Y	Wayne "Corey" Cros; Park Chang-hak	Hyena	Korean	2006	
"Hana Mizuki"	Super Junior-K.R.Y.	Yo Hitoto; Mashikota Tsurou	Hero	Japanese	2013	
"Hang Over"	Super Junior-D&E	Rick Bridges; Donghae; Strawberrybananaclub; ‡	606	Korean	2024	
"Happy Together"	Super Junior	Lee Jae-myung; Cho Sa-ra	Sorry, Sorry	Korean	2009	
"Haru (HARU)"	Super Junior	Donghae; Kwon Soon-il; ‡	SPY	Korean	2012	
"Harue (A Day)"	Super Junior	Kim Jung-bae; Kenzie	A-Cha	Korean	2011	
"Hate Christmas"	Super Junior	Maryjane; Mok Ji-min; Jonas Ekdahl; Rickard Bonde Truumeel; Mike Watson	The Road: Celebration	Korean	2022	
"Have A Nice Day"	Super Junior-D&E	Lee Hye-yung; Nicolas Farmakalidis; René Miller	Countdown	Korean	2021	
"Hayangeojinmal (Tell Me Baby)"	Super Junior	Im Soo-ran; Lee Hyo-jae; Zaydro	The Renaissance	Korean	2021	
"Heads Up"	Super Junior	Cho Yoon-kyung; Alexander Karlsson; Alexej Viktorovitch; Sandra Lyng	Time Slip	Korean	2019	
"Heeojineun Nal (A 'Good'bye)"	Super Junior	Park Chang-hyun	Sexy, Free & Single	Korean	2012	
"Hello"	Donghae & Eunhyuk	Sara Sakurai; Jinoo; Peter Hyun; Young Sky	Ride Me	Japanese	2014	
"Here We Are"†	Super Junior-D&E	Amon Hayashi; Justin Reinstein	Style	Japanese	2017	
"Here We Go"	Super Junior	Kim Ea-na; Carl Utbult; Tebey Ottoh; Fredrik Hult	Bonamana	Korean	2010	
"HERO"	Super Junior	Natsumi Kobayashi; G'haran "PK" Degeddingseze; Jamie Jones; Jack Kugell; Jason Pennock	Hero	Japanese	2013	
"HERO" (Performance ver.)	Super Junior	Natsumi Kobayashi; G'haran "PK" Degeddingseze; Jamie Jones; Jack Kugell; Jason Pennock	Hero	Japanese	2013	
"Hit Me Up"	Super Junior	Teddy Riley; DOM; Hyun Seung	This Is Love	Korean	2014	
"Hiteu (H.I.T)"	Super Junior	Kim Jung-bae; Kenzie	H.I.T OST	Korean	2007	
"Hoesang"	Super Junior-K.R.Y.	Yoon Il-sang; Lee Seung-ho	Yoon Il-sang 21st Anniversary I'm 21 Part 2	Korean	2012	
"Home"	Super Junior-D&E	Donghae; J-DUB; Eunhyuk; 1iL; ‡	Countdown	Korean	2021	
"Hot Babe"†	Super Junior-D&E	Eunhyuk; GASHIMA; Jake K; ‡	Style	Japanese	2018	
"House Party"†	Super Junior	Yoo Young-jin; Christian Fast; Didrik Thott; Sebastian Thott	The Renaissance	Korean	2021	
"Huālí De Dúxiù (S.O.L.O)"	Super Junior-M	Tim McEwan; Lars Halvor Jensen; Reed Vertelney; Zhou Weijie	Skip Beat! OST	Chinese	2011	
"Hwanjeolgi (Mid-season)"	Super Junior	Hwang Hyun	Mamacita	Korean	2014	
"I Am"	Super Junior	Leeteuk; Eunhyuk; Donghae; Sungmin; Greg Lynch; ‡	Don't Don	Korean	2007	
"I Think I"†	Super Junior	January8; Cho Yoon-kyung; Eunhyuk; Choi Jin-suk; Nermin Harambasic; Jakob Mihoubi; Rudi Daouk; ‡	Time Slip	Korean	2019	
"I Think I" (Japanese ver.)†	Super Junior	January8; Cho Yoon-kyung; Eunhyuk; h.toyosaki; Choi Jin-suk; Nermin Harambasic; Jakob Mihoubi; Rudi Daouk; ‡	I Think U	Japanese	2019	
"I Wanna Dance"	Donghae & Eunhyuk	Sara Sakurai; Peter Hyun; Young Sky; Jinoo	Hero and Ride Me	Japanese	2013	
"I Wanna Dance (Sane)"†	Super Junior-D&E	Team One Sound	The Beat Goes On (Special edition)	Korean	2015	
"I Wanna Love You" (Studio ver.)	Donghae and Eunhyuk	Chance	Super Show 3 – The 3rd Asia Tour Concert Album	Korean	2011	
"I'm Your Man"	Super Junior 05	Kenzie	Show Me Your Love	Korean	2005	
"Ibyeol... Neon Swimni (Heartquake)"	Super Junior-K.R.Y. ft. U-know Yunho and Micky Yoochun	Cho Joon-young; July	Sorry, Sorry	Korean	2009	
"If You"†	Super Junior-D&E	Hasegawa; Donghae; J-DUB; ‡	Style	Japanese	2018	
"If You" (Korean ver.)	Super Junior-D&E	Donghae; J-DUB; ‡	Danger	Korean	2019	
"Illusion (Obsessed)"	Super Junior-D&E	Eunhyuk; Jake K; Andreas Oberg; Chris Wahle; ‡	'Bout You	Korean	2018	
"Ippseureul Kkaemulgo"† (Note: Literally "Bite the Lips")	Super Junior	Oh Seung-eun; Bae Hwa-young	The President OST Part 1	Korean	2010	
"Islands"	Super Junior	Seo Ji-eum; Lee Yoo-jin; Cho Yoon-kyung; Ricky Hanley; Alex Holmgren; Andreas Johansson	Mamacita	Korean	2014	
"It's You"	Super Junior-M	Zhou Mi; Tina Wang; NoizeBank; ‡	Break Down	Chinese	2013	
"Jalhaebwa (Good Luck!!)"	Super Junior-Happy	ROZ	Cooking? Cooking!	Korean	2008	
"Jamdeulgo Sipeo (In My Dream)"	Super Junior	Kwon Yoon-jung; Kim Ji-hoo	Bonamana	Korean	2010	
"Jidokage (Lost)"	Super Junior-D&E	Donghae; J-DUB; ‡	'Bout You	Korean	2018	
"Jijibae (GGB)"†	Super Junior-D&E	Donghae; Virgo; Maxx Song; Park Ji-san; ‡	606	Korean	2024	
"Jinsim (All My Heart)"	Super Junior	Hong Ji-you; Leeteuk; Henry Lau; ‡	Bonamana (Version C)	Korean	2010	
"Joeun Saram (Good Person)"	Super Junior	Yoo Hee-yeol	Bonamana	Korean	2010	
"Jogaekkopjil Mukko"	SM Town	Yoon Hyung-jo	2007 Summer SM Town–Fragile	Korean	2007	
"Joke (Jokeudeunnyo)"†	Super Junior-L.S.S.	Lee Beom-hun; Bir$day; GESTURE; Kim Hye-jung; Shindong; ‡	Joke	Korean	2024	
"JOIN HANDS"†	Super Junior-K.R.Y.	Sara Sakurai; Fredrik Hult; Andreas Stone Johansson; Andreas Oberg; Steven Lee	Star	Japanese	2015	
"Jugeoinneun Geot (Dead At Heart)"	Super Junior	Park Chang-hyun	Sorry, Sorry	Korean	2009	
"Jung (...ing)"	Super Junior-K.R.Y.	Park Chang-hyun	This Is Love	Korean	2014	
"Jungle"	Super Junior-D&E	Lee Seu-ran; Rick Bridges; Jake K; Andreas Oberg; Drew Ryan Scott; Nick Kaelar	Danger	Korean	2019	
"Jù Lí De Yōng Bào"	Zhou Mi	Crystal Cheung; Michael Wong	Break Down	Chinese	2013	
"Kanibal (Carnival)"	Super Junior	Kangin; Elin Viktoria Wrethov; Anders Wrethov; Johan Rikard Deltinger; ‡	09 Summer SM Town	Korean	2009	
"Keep In Touch"	Super Junior 05	Hitoshi Harukawa; Cho Yoon-kyung	Twins	Korean	2005	
"Kěwáng (A Man In Love)"	Super Junior-M	Zhou Mi; Yoo Young-jin; ‡	Me	Chinese	2008	
"Kimi ga Naitara"	Donghae & Eunhyuk	SHIROSE; ZETTON; Darren Martyn	Ride Me	Japanese	2014	
"Kiss Kiss Dynamite"	Donghae & Eunhyuk	Natsumi Kobayashi; Sam Gray	Ride Me	Japanese	2014	
"Kkukdanji (Sunny)"	Super Junior-Happy	Kim Jung-bae; Kenzie	Cooking? Cooking!	Korean	2008	
"Kkumkkuneun Hioro"	Super Junior-K.R.Y.	Park Geun-tae; Kang Eun-kyung	Partner OST	Korean	2009	
"L.O.V.E."	Super Junior 05	Shin Ji-won; S. Finneide; Jens Thoresen	Twins	Korean	2005	
"La La La"	Super Junior-D&E	Lee Ji-yeon; Cesar Peralta; Didrik Thott	Countdown	Korean	2021	
"Let It Go"	Donghae & Eunhyuk	AKIRA; Kim Sang-mi; Marco Borrero; Mica Gayle; R Seragnoli	Ride Me	Japanese	2014	
"Let's Dance"	Super Junior	Seo Ji-eum; Im Kwang-wook; Ylva Dimberg; Nermin Harambasic	Mamacita	Korean	2014	
"Let's Get It On"†	Super Junior-D&E	Amon Hayashi; Henry Lau; GEN; Mage; ‡	Star	Japanese	2015	
"Lights, Camera, Action!"	Super Junior-D&E	JQ; NoizeBank	The Beat Goes On	Korean	2015	
"Like That"†	Super Junior-D&E	Hiromi; Donghae; Virgo; 17; ber.ryko; Kim Jun-tae; Lee Jae-jun; ‡	YOU&ME	Japanese	2024	
"Livin' In"	Super Junior-D&E	Kim In-hyang; Soro; Cory Enemy; Kamaljit Jhooti; Dan Farber; Daniel Bedingfield; MZMC	'Bout You	Korean	2018	
"Lo Siento"†	Super Junior ft. Leslie Grace	Kenzie; Heechul; Eunhyuk; Mario Caceres; Yasmil Maruffo; Leslie Grace; Daniel "Obi" Klein; Charli Taft; Andreas Oberg; Juan "Play" Salinas; Oscar "Skillz" Salinas; ‡	Replay	Korean, Spanish and English	2018	
"Lo Siento"	Super Junior ft. KARD	Kenzie; Heechul; Eunhyuk; Mario Caceres; Yasmil Maruffo; Leslie Grace; Daniel "Obi" Klein; Charli Taft; Andreas Oberg; Juan "Play" Salinas; Oscar "Skillz" Salinas; ‡	Replay (Digital edition)	Korean	2018	
"Lo Siento" (Play-N-Skillz remix ver.)	Super Junior ft. Leslie Grace	Kenzie; Heechul; Eunhyuk; Mario Caceres; Yasmil Maruffo; Leslie Grace; Daniel "Obi" Klein; Charli Taft; Andreas Oberg; Juan "Play" Salinas; Oscar "Skillz" Salinas; ‡	Replay	Korean, Spanish and English	2018	
"Lose It"†	Super Junior-D&E	h.toyosaki; Justin Reinstein	Style	Japanese	2018	
"Love That I Need"	Donghae & Eunhyuk ft. Henry Lau	Miyakei; NoizeBank	Hero and Ride Me	Japanese	2013	
"Love That I Need"	Super Junior-D&E ft. Henry Lau	Donghae; Eunhyuk; NoizeBank; ‡	The Beat Goes On (Special edition)	Korean	2015	
"Lovely Day"	Super Junior	Park Chang-hyun	U	Korean	2006	
"Lovely Day" (Rearranged) (Studio ver.)	Super Junior	Park Chang-hyun	Super Show 4 – Super Junior World Tour Concert Album	Korean	2013	
"Loving You"†	Super Junior-K.R.Y.	Donghae; D20; ‡	Ms Panda and Mr Hedgehog OST Part 2	Korean	2012	
"Magic"†	Super Junior	Yoon Kyung; Purple J; G-High; Thomas Sardorf	Magic	Korean	2015	
"Magic"†	Super Junior	AKIRA; Lee Joo-hyoung; G-High; Thomas Sardorf	Star	Japanese	2016	
"Magical"	TVXQ and Super Junior	Lee Seu-ran; William James 'Bleu' McAuley III; Mats Valentin; Tobias Norberg	2021 Winter SM Town: SMCU Express	Korean	2021	
"Majimak Seungbu (The Girl is Mine)"	Super Junior	Kim Jung-bae; Kenzie	Don't Don (Repackaged edition)	Korean	2007	
"Majuchiji Malja (Let's Not)"	Super Junior-K.R.Y.	Hwanhi; Cho Joon-young	Sorry, Sorry	Korean	2009	
"Make You Smile"	Super Junior	Natsumi Kobayashi; Jan Andersson; Peter Heden	non-album song (Note: Side track for the Japanese single "One More Time (Otra Vez) (ft. Reik)")	Japanese	2018	
"Mamacita (Ayaya)"†	Super Junior	Yoo Young-jin; DOM; Hyun-seung; Teddy Riley; J.SOL	Mamacita	Korean	2014	
"Mamacita -Ayaya-"†	Super Junior	Amon Hayashi; Teddy Riley; Yoo Young-jin; DOM	Star	Japanese	2014	
"Mango"†	Super Junior	Kang Eun-jeong; Ryan Jhun; Gustav Nyström; Moa Pettersson Hammar; Robin Stjernberg	The Road: Keep on Going	Korean	2022	
"Marry U"†	Super Junior	Kwon Yoon-jung; Lee Jae-myeong	Don't Don	Korean	2007	
"Marry U"	Super Junior-M	Zhou Mi; Lee Jae-myeong; ‡	Me	Chinese	2008	
"Marry U" (Japanese version)†	Super Junior	Kwon Yoon-jung; Lee Jae-myeong	Don't Don (Japanese edition)	Japanese	2009	
"Marry U" (New version)	Super Junior	Kwon Yoon-jung; Lee Jae-myeong	Don't Don (Repackaged edition)	Korean	2007	
"Me"†	Super Junior-M	Kàn Shì Lán Sè; Kenzie	Me	Chinese	2008	
"Me" (Korean version)	Super Junior-M	Kenzie	Me	Korean	2008	
"Me & U"	Super Junior	Lee Woo-jin; Song Min-joo; Cho Yoon-kyung; Eunhyuk; Jamil "Digi" Chammas; Justin Lucas; Michael (M.BRONX) San Filippo; Anthony Pavel; MZMC; ‡	Replay	Korean	2018	
"Meiunsen (Destiny)"	Super Junior-M	Goro Matsui; Kim Jin-hwan	Perfection (Japanese edition) and Hero	Japanese	2011	
"Meolli (Far Away)"	Super Junior-D&E	Rick Bridges; Deevan	Countdown	Korean	2021	
"Meomunda (Daydream)"	Super Junior	Ha Jung-ho; Storyteller	Sexy, Free & Single	Korean	2012	
"Meoributeo Balkkeutkkaji ('Bout You)"†	Super Junior-D&E	Donghae; Eunhyuk; J-DUB; ‡	'Bout You	Korean	2018	
"Měitiān (Forever With You)"	Super Junior-M	Zhou Mi; Andreas Oberg; Martin K; ILANG; ‡	Devil	Chinese	2015	
"Midnight Fantasy"	Super Junior	Park Chang-hyun	Don't Don	Korean	2007	
"Miina (Bonamana)"†	Super Junior	Yoo Young-jin	Bonamana	Korean	2010	
"Miina (Bonamana)" (Rearranged) (Studio ver.)	Super Junior	Yoo Young-jin	Super Show 4 – Super Junior World Tour Concert Album	Korean	2013	
"Miracle"†	Super Junior 05	Yoon Hyo-sang; Thomas Charles La Verdi; Daniel Pandher	Twins	Korean	2005	
"Miracle" (Rearranged) (Studio ver.)	Super Junior	Yoon Hyo-sang; Thomas Charles La Verdi; Daniel Pandher	Super Show 4 – Super Junior World Tour Concert Album	Korean	2013	
"Missin' U"	Super Junior	SHIRO; Ken Ingwersen	Don't Don	Korean	2007	
"Missing Pieces"	Super Junior-D&E	bay; Avenue 52; Sqvare	606	Korean	2024	
"Miwo (Hate U, Love U)"	Super Junior	Kim Jung-bae; Kenzie	Don't Don	Korean	2007	
"Mìngyùn Xiān (Destiny)"	Super Junior-M	Liu Yuan; Kim Jin-hwan	Perfection	Chinese	2011	
"Monster"	Super Junior	Mikkel Reme Sigvardt; Tim Kellett; Robin Taylor Firth; Peter Biker	Sorry, Sorry	Korean	2009	
"Mother"	Super Junior-D&E	Donghae; Team One Sound; ‡	The Beat Goes On	Korean	2015	
"Motto Gyutto"	Super Junior-D&E	Hidenori Tanaka; Lee Jung-won; Oh Ja-hyun; Ki Ryeon	Style	Japanese	2018	
"MOTORCYCLE"	Donghae & Eunhyuk	AKIRA; Lars Pedersen; Remee S. Jackman; Nicky Fredrik Russell; Feras Agwa	Ride Me and Star	Japanese	2014	
"Motorcycle"	Super Junior-D&E	JQ; Lars Pedersen; Remee S. Jackman; Nicky Fredrik Russell; Feras Agwa	The Beat Goes On (Special edition)	Korean	2015	
"Mr. Nice Guy"	Super Junior-D&E	Sara Sakurai; Team One Sound	non-album song (Note: B-side track for the single "Let's Get It On")	Japanese	2015	
"Mr. Simple"†	Super Junior	Yoo Young-jin	Mr. Simple	Korean	2011	
"Mr. Simple"†	Super Junior	Goro Matsui; Yoo Young-jin	Hero	Japanese	2011	
"Muse"	Super Junior-D&E	Rick Bridges; Rian Ball; Case Arnold; Sebastian Garcia	Countdown	Korean	2021	
"My Love, My Kiss, My Heart"	Super Junior-K.R.Y.	Kim Tae-sung; Denzil Remedios; Kibwe Luke; Sharif Slater; Ryan Jhun	Mr. Simple	Korean	2011	
"My Only Girl"	Super Junior	Hong Jin-you; Brandon Fraley; Joshua Welton	Bonamana	Korean	2010	
"My Wish"	Super Junior	Jisoo Park (153/Joombas); Hyuk Shin (153/Joombas); MRey (153CreatorsClub); Papi Lee (153/Joombas)	The Road: Keep on Going	Korean	2022	
"Mystery"	Super Junior	Kim Min-ji; Daniel Traynor; Jess Morgan; Jack Morgan; Coach & Sendo	The Renaissance	Korean	2021	
"Na Gateungeon Eomneungongayo"	Super Junior-T	Chu Ga-yeol	Rokkugo	Korean	2007	
"Naerimyon (Blue Tomorrow)" (Korean ver.)	Super Junior-M	Park Ki-won	Super Girl	Korean	2009	
"Nappeun Yeoja (Boom Boom)"	Super Junior	Kenzie; Hayden Bell; Wayne Backford; Ray Lavender	Bonamana	Korean	2010	
"Need U"†	Super Junior-D&E	Erik Lidbom; Adam Jönsson; Eunhyuk; Donghae; ‡	Countdown (Zero version) (Epilogue)	Korean	2021	
"Neo Gateun Saram Tto Eopseo (No Other)"†	Super Junior	Kenzie; SHARIF & SLATER; Kibwe Luke; Ryan Jhun	Bonamana (Version C)	Korean	2010	
"Neoegero (The Way Back To You)"	Super Junior-K.R.Y.	Lee Seu-ran; KAZEF; XLMT; YEL	When We Were Us	Korean	2020	
"Neoneun Namankeum (Growing Pains)"	Super Junior-D&E	Donghae; Team One Sound; ‡	The Beat Goes On	Korean	2015	
"Neorago (It's You)"†	Super Junior	E-TRIBE	Sorry, Sorry (Version C)	Korean	2009	
"Neorago (It's You)" (Rearranged) (Studio ver.)	Super Junior	E-TRIBE	The 2nd Asia Tour Concert Album Super Show 2	Korean	2009	
"Neorobuteo (From U)"	Super Junior	Yoo Young-jin; Yoo Han-jin	Sexy, Free & Single	Korean	2012	
"Neoui Ireumeun (What Is Your Name)"	Super Junior-D&E ft. Shindong	Shindong; Eunhyuk; With Ru; ‡	Bad Liar	Korean	2020	
"Neowa Na (Come a Little Closer)"†	Super Junior	Leeteuk; Peter Hyun; J-DUB; Max Changmin; ‡	Analog Trip OST	Korean	2019	
"Neoyeosseumyeon Cham Joketda... (If Only You)"	Super Junior	Yoo Hyun-jung	The Road: Celebration	Korean	2022	
"Neukkimjeoginneukkim (Feel That Feelin')"	Super Junior-D&E	Song Yu; Kim Su-min; Jeff Lewis; Brock Buchanan Westover; Jr.	Countdown	Korean	2021	
"New Balance"	Super Junior-D&E	Kim Me-a-ri; Micah Gordon; Henrik; Gus	606	Korean	2024	
"Niga Joeun Iyu (Why I Like You)"	Super Junior	SHIRO; Jimmy Burney; Steven Lee; Pascal "Claps" Guyon; Sean Michael Alexander	Sorry, Sorry	Korean	2009	
"Nǐ Shì Wǒ De Qíjì (Miracle)"	Super Junior-M	Ma Zhi Yong; Daniel Pandher; Thomas Charles La Verdi	Me	Chinese	2008	
"No Drama"	Super Junior	Leeteuk; Oneway; ‡	Time Slip	Korean	2019	
"No Love"†	Super Junior-D&E	Rick Bridges; Jonathan Gusmark; Ludvig Evers; Maxx Song; Bobii Lewis	Bad Liar	Korean	2020	
"Nom, Nom, Nom (You Got It)"	Super Junior	Leeteuk; Heechul; Eunhyuk; Team One Sound; The Stereotypes; THREE; ‡	Magic	Korean	2015	
"Noran Saram (Your Eyes)"	Super Junior	Kim Jung-bae; Kenzie	Bonamana	Korean	2010	
"NOW"	Super Junior	Kim Bu-min; hitchhiker	Sexy, Free & Single	Korean	2012	
"Off Line"	Super Junior-D&E	Lee Yi-jin; Brandon Hesson; Jake Lawson; Zac Lawson; Johnnie Harris IV; 153/Joombas	Bad Blood	Korean	2020	
"On and On"†	Super Junior	Amon Hayashi; Siwon; IMLAY; Noday; Kago Pengchi; ‡	Star	Japanese	2017	
"One Love" (Studio ver.)	Super Junior	Thomas Charles La Verdi; Daniel Pandher; Jay Pea; Eunhyuk; ‡	The 1st Asia Tour Concert Album Super Show	Korean	2008	
"One More Time (Otra Vez)"†	Super Junior ft. Reik	ZNEE; Pablo Preciado; Andreas Stone Johansson; Denniz Jamm; Jakob Mihoubi; Rudi Daouk	One More Time	Korean and Spanish	2018	
"One More Time (Otra Vez)"†	Super Junior ft. Reik	h.toyosaki; Andreas Stone Johansson; Denniz Jamm; Jakob Mihoubi; Rudi Daouk	Star	Japanese	2018	
"One More Time (Otra Vez)" (SJ ver.)	Super Junior	ZNEE; Andreas Stone Johansson; Denniz Jamm; Jakob Mihoubi; Rudi Daouk	One More Time	Korean	2018	
"Oneuri Jinago Namyeon (To You, Tomorrow)"	Super Junior-D&E	Joni; Eunhyuk; ZigZag Note; ‡	Bad Blood	Korean	2020	
"Only U"	Super Junior	Leeteuk; Donghae; Lee Jae-myung; ‡	SPY	Korean	2012	
"Only You"	Super Junior-D&E	Donghae; ROKSTAXIL; Arte; Louis; Fascinador; Kim Jun-tae; ‡	Inevitable	Korean	2024	
"Oops!!"	Super Junior ft. f(x)	Leeteuk; Heechul; Shindong; Eunhyuk; Donghae; Misfit; Kalle Engstrom; William J Fuller; ‡	A-Cha	Korean	2011	
"Opera (Opera)"	Super Junior	Kenzie; Thomas Troelsen; Engelina Larsen	Mr. Simple	Korean	2011	
"Opera" (Japanese ver.)†	Super Junior	Masanori Nagaoka; Thomas Troelsen; Engelina Larson	Hero	Japanese	2012	
"Oppa, Oppa" (Japanese ver.)†	Donghae & Eunhyuk	Goro Matsui; Steve Greenberg	Hero and Ride Me	Japanese	2012	
"Our Love" (Japanese ver.)	Super Junior	Leonn; Yoo Jae-ha	Hero	Japanese	2012	
"Outsider"	Super Junior	Kenzie; Herbie Crichlow; Adam Pallin; Thomas Troelsen	SPY	Korean	2012	
"Over"	Super Junior 05	Kim Young-hoo	Twins	Korean	2005	
"Pajamapati (Pajama Party)"†	Super Junior-Happy	Lee Seung-ho; Park Hae-won	Cooking? Cooking!	Korean	2008	
"Paradox"	Super Junior	jane; Rick Bridges; SQUAR; Lee A-il	The Renaissance	Korean	2021	
"Plausible Theory"	Super Junior-D&E	Kwon Da-eul; VINCENZO; Shin Kong; Adam Seuba	Inevitable	Korean	2024	
"Point of No Return"	Super Junior-K.R.Y.	S-KEY-A; Andreas Stone Johansson; Rebecca Walim	non-album song (Note: B-side track for the single "Join Hands")	Japanese	2015	
"Pokpung (Storm)"	Super Junior	Kim Jung-bae; Kenzie	Mr. Simple	Korean	2011	
"Polygraph"	Super Junior-D&E	Ume; Park Seul-ki; Andreas Oberg; Drew Ryan Scott	Style	Japanese	2018	
"Ppappiyong (Butterfly)"	Super Junior	Hwang Hyun; Shin Anise	Sexy, Free & Single	Korean	2012	
"Promise You"†	Super Junior-K.R.Y.	Miyakei; ZETTON; SHIKATA; Mats Lie Skare	Hero	Japanese	2013	
"Puff, the Magic Dragon" (Studio ver.)	Super Junior	Peter Yarrow; Leonard Lipton	The 2nd Asia Tour Concert Album Super Show 2	Korean	2009	
"Pureuge Binnadeon Uriui Gyejeol (When We Were Us)"†	Super Junior-K.R.Y.	4Beontaja	When We Were Us	Korean	2020	
"Rararara (Be My Girl)"	Super Junior	Kim Bu-min; Henri Jouni Kristian Lanz; William Rappaport; Aku Rannila; Julimar Santos	Mr. Simple	Korean	2011	
"Red Muhly"	Eunhyuk	Eunhyuk; basecamp; Colde; Khakii; ‡	Countdown (be version)	Korean	2021	
"Reset"	Super Junior	Park Chang-hak; Martin Sutton; Shridar Ashokkumar Salanki	Sorry, Sorry	Korean	2009	
"Rock This House"	Super Junior 05	Yoon Hyo-sang; Havid Engmark; Mark Lister	Twins	Korean	2005	
"Rock Your Body"	Super Junior	Donghae; J-DUB; ‡	Timeless	Korean	2020	
"Rock'n Shine!"	Super Junior	Kim Yoo-nah	Devil	Korean	2015	
"Rockstar"	Super Junior	D20; Peter; Young Sky	Sexy, Free & Single	Korean	2012	
"Rokkugo!!!"†	Super Junior-T	Yoon Myung-sun	Rokkugo	Korean	2007	
"Rokugo!!! (Rokuko)"†	Super Junior-T	c.close; Yoon Myoung-sun	Hero	Japanese	2008	
"Rose"	Super Junior-D&E	Donghae; Virgo; ‡	606	Korean	2024	
"RUM DEE DEE"	Super Junior-D&E	Hong Su-ji; Kim Su-yeon; Kyung Jin-hee; Patrick Hartman; Nico Stradi; Jamil "Digi" Chammas; MZMC	'Bout You	Korean	2018	
"Run Away"	Super Junior-D&E	Donghae; ROKSTAXIL; 17; jelly; ‡	Inevitable	Korean	2024	
"Runaway"	Super Junior	Shin Agnes; Onestar; Choo Dae-gwan; Jeok Jae	Play	Korean	2017	
"Ryōriō (Cooking? Cooking!)"	Super Junior-Happy	ROZ; Lee Sang-kyu	non-album song (Note: Side track for the promotional single "Marry U")	Japanese	2008	
"Sakura no Hanaga Saku Koro"	Ryeowook	Natsumi Kobayashi; Yoon Jong-sung; Naoto Okabe; Jong Jung-seok	Star	Japanese	2019	
"Santa U Are The One"†	Super Junior, Henry Lau and Zhou Mi	Ove Andre Brenna	2011 Winter SM Town – The Warmest Gift	English	2011	
"Sarang Hanalyo (Only Love)"	SM Town	Lim Seon-ah; Sean Hosein	07 Winter SM Town	Korean	2007	
"Sarang" (Note: Stylized as "Sarang♥")	Super Junior	Leeteuk; Heechul; Team One Sound; ‡	Magic	Korean	2015	
"Sarangi Ireoke (My All Is In You)"	Super Junior	Kwon Yoon-jung; Luther "Squeak" Jackson; Stephen Beckham	Bonamana	Korean	2010	
"Sarangi Jungneun Byeong (Love Disease)"	Super Junior	Hwi Sung; Jimmy Burney; Sean Alexander; Pascal "Claps" Guyon	Sorry, Sorry (Version C)	Korean	2009	
"Sarangi Meotji Anke (Raining Spell For Love)"	Super Junior	Jeong Ju-hee; DOM; Lee Hyun-seung; J.SOL; Teddy Riley	Mamacita and The Renaissance	Korean	2014	
"Sarangi Tteonada (She's Gone)"	Super Junior	Kwon Yoon-jung; Hwang Song-je	Don't Don	Korean	2007	
"Saturday Night"	Super Junior-D&E	S-KEY-A; Henrik Nordenback; Christian Fast; Fernando Fuentes	Present	Japanese	2015	
"Scary House"	Super Junior-D&E	AKIRA; Martin Hoberg Hedegaard; Fridolin Nordsoe; Frederik Tao Nordsoe; Simo Pirhonen; Snorre Forsgen; Henri Jouni Kristian Lanz	Present	Japanese	2015	
"Scene Stealer"	Super Junior	Eunhyuk; Joseph "Joe Millionaire" Foster; Davey Nate; Prince Chapelle; Phillip Guillory; MZMC; Otha "Vaksen" Davis III; ‡	Play	Korean	2017	
"Seaside Hyugeso (Boom Boom)"	SM Town	Yoon Hyo-sang; Anders Wrethov; Johan Rikard Deltinger	09 Summer SM Town	Korean	2009	
"SEOUL"† (Note: Also sometimes stylised as "S.E.O.U.L")	Super Junior and Girls' Generation	Lee Jae-myung	Seoul	Korean	2009	
"Sexy, Free & Single"†	Super Junior	Yoo Young-jin; Daniel "Obi" Klein; Thomas Sardorf; Lasse Lindorff	Sexy, Free & Single	Korean	2012	
"Sexy, Free & Single" (Jinbo Remix)"	Super Junior	Yoo Young-jin; Daniel "Obi" Klein; Thomas Sardorf; Lasse Lindorff	10 CC X SM Seoul Melody	Korean	2013	
"Sexy, Free & Single" (Japanese ver.)†	Super Junior	Leonn; Dicky "Obi" Klein; Thomas Sardorf; Lasse Lindorff	Hero	Japanese	2012	
"Shadow (Jyot Ha)"	Super Junior	Kim In-hyeong; Park Sung-hee; Hyuk Shin; Joony; MRey; Jeff Lewis; EVRYWHR	Timeless	Korean	2020	
"Shake It Up!"	Super Junior	Kim Young-hoo; Ryan Jhun; Antwann Frost; Ronald Frost; Michael Muncie; Denzil Remedios; Kibwe Luke	Bonamana	Korean	2010	
"Shake It Up!" (Remix ver.)	Super Junior	Kim Young-hoo; Ryan Jhun; Antwann Frost; Ronald Frost; Michael Muncie; Denzil Remedios; Kibwe Luke	Bonamana	Korean	2010	
"Share My Love"	Super Junior-D&E	danke; Chris Tsika Kabala; Jean Michel Sissoko	Countdown	Korean	2021	
"Shatta Shimero (Close The Shutter)"†	Super Junior-L.S.S.	H.Toyosaki; HeyFarmer; NiiHwa; Prism Filter; Shindong	Let's Standing Show	Japanese	2023	
"Shining Star"	Super Junior	Yoo Young-seok	Sorry, Sorry	Korean	2009	
"Shining Star" (Rearranged) (Studio ver.)	Super Junior	Yoo Young-seok	The 2nd Asia Tour Concert Album Super Show 2	Korean	2009	
"Shirt"	Super Junior	Donghae; Team One Sound; ‡	Mamacita	Korean	2014	
"Show"†	Super Junior	Kim Dong-ryul	Time Slip	Korean	2019	
"Show Me Your Love"†	TVXQ with Super Junior 05	Kenzie	Show Me Your Love	Korean	2005	
"Show Time"†	Super Junior	Chae Ji-hyo (Artiffect); Jo Yoon-kyung; Roonie Icon; Werdy; Jay Jay; Adile; Park Woo-jeong	Show Time	Korean	2024	
"Sigan Cha (Too Late)"	Super Junior	Seo Ji-eum; Cesar Peralta; Christopher Golighty; Francia Lopez; Anthony Lee	Play	Korean	2017	
"Simply Beautiful"	Super Junior	Cho Yoon-kyung; Hyuk Shin; DK; Marco Reyes; Jarah Gibson; Jeffrey Lewis	Devil	Korean	2015	
"Skeleton"†	Donghae & Eunhyuk	Ushiro Shimura; Carlos Water Parker; Will Simms; Hayley Aitken; Iggy Strange-Dahl	Present	Japanese	2014	
"SKY"†	Super Junior-K.R.Y.	Lee Sang-yeol; Park Geun-cheol	To the Beautiful You OST	Korean	2012	
"Skydive"	Super Junior	Lee Yoo-jin; FRANTS; Drew Ryan Scott; Sean Michael Alexander	Time Slip	Korean	2019	
"Smile!"	Super Junior	Kenzie	2006 Summer SM Town	Korean	2006	
"Snow Dream"	SM Town	Yoon Hyo-sang; S. Finneide	2006 Winter SM Town–Snow Dream	Korean	2006	
"Snow White"	Super Junior	Goro Matsui; HIKARI	non-album song (Note: B-side track for the single "Mr. Simple")	Japanese	2011	
"Snowman"	Super Junior	Peomkin (153/Joombas); Humbler; Davey Nate; Timothy "C Minor" Zimnoch	The Road: Celebration	Korean	2022	
"So Cold" (Studio ver.)	Eunhyuk, Donghae, Siwon and Henry	Henry Lau; Eunhyuk; Nallas Neil; Gen Neo; ‡	Super Show 5 – Super Junior World Tour Concert Album	Korean	2015	
"So I"	Super Junior 05	Kwon Ho-jung; Han Sang-won	Twins	Korean	2005	
"Somebody New"†	Super Junior	Seo Ji-eum; Hyuk Shin; MRey	Time Slip	Korean	2019	
"Soneul Jabayo"	Super Junior, Girls' Generation, SS501, Jewelry, Brown Eyed Girls, TGUS and Lee Hyun		2008 SBS Hope TV24	Korean	2008	
"Sorry, Sorry" (Japanese ver.)	Super Junior	c.close; Yoo Young-jin	Sorry, Sorry (Japanese edition)	Japanese	2009	
"Sorry, Sorry" (Remix) (Studio ver.)	Super Junior	Yoo Young-jin	The 2nd Asia Tour Concert Album Super Show 2	Korean	2009	
"Sorry, Sorry" (Rearranged) (Studio ver.)	Super Junior	Yoo Young-jin	Super Show 3 – The 3rd Asia Tour Concert Album	Korean	2011	
"Sorry, Sorry – Answer" (Studio ver.)	Super Junior	Yoo Young-jin	The 2nd Asia Tour Concert Album Super Show 2	Korean	2009	
"Sowoni Innayo (Sapphire Blue)"	Super Junior	Taehoon; Michael Scott Hartung; Thomas Charles La Verdi	Don't Don	Korean	2007	
"Spin Up!"	Super Junior	Jo Yoon-kyung; Heechul; Eunhyuk; Mike Woods; Kevin White; Hyuk Shin; Cameron Edward Neilson; MZMC; ‡	Play	Korean	2017	
"Splash"	Yesung	Hidenori Tanaka; DONNA; Ricky; CuzD	Star	Japanese	2019	
"Spotlight"	Super Junior	h.toyosaki; Erik Lidbom; SAMDELL	I Think U	Japanese	2020	
"SPY"†	Super Junior	Kenzie; Thomas Troelsen; Mikkel Remee Sigvardt; Irving Szathmary; Hwang Hyun	SPY	Korean	2012	
"Ssori Ssori (Sorry, Sorry)"†	Super Junior	Yoo Young-jin	Sorry, Sorry	Korean	2009	
"Star"	Super Junior	Natsumi Kobayashi; Caesar	Star	Japanese	2021	
"Stay With Me"	Super Junior	seizetheday; Le'mon; Trippy	Time Slip	Korean	2019	
"Strong (Qiángshì Rùqīn)"	Super Junior-M	Zhang You; Mei Zhi Hui; Liu Yuan; hitchhiker	Swing	Chinese	2014	
"Success"	Super Junior	Kwon Yun-jung; Shim Jae-hee; Park Jun-soo; Choi Sung-kwon	H.I.T OST	Korean	2007	
"Suit Up" †	Super Junior-L.S.S.	Adrian Mckinnon; Jeremy "Tay" Jasper; Kim Da-ye; Oh Min-joo; Park Seong-hee; Skylar Mones	Suit Up	Korean	2024	
"Sunrise"†	Super Junior-D&E	Donghae; J-DUB; Eunhyuk; Ume; ‡	Style	Japanese	2018	
"Sunrise" (Korean ver.)	Super Junior-D&E	Donghae; Eunhyuk; J-DUB; ‡	Danger	Korean	2019	
"SUPER"	Super Junior	JQ; Ahn Young-ju; Amelie; Kim Chang-rak; Kim Soo-bin	The Renaissance	Korean	2021	
"Super Clap"†	Super Junior	lalala Studio; Sebastian Thott; Andreas Oberg; Ninos Hanna	Time Slip	Korean	2019	
"Super Duper"†	Super Junior	Team One Sound; Leeteuk; ‡	Replay	Korean	2018	
"Super Girl"†	Super Junior-M	Ai Bi; Yoo Young-jin	Super Girl	Chinese	2009	
"Super Girl" (Korean ver.)	Super Junior-M	Yoo Young-jin	Super Girl	Korean	2009	
"Superman"	Super Junior	Yoo Young-jin	Mr. Simple (Version B)	Korean	2011	
"Intro -Superman Prelude-"	Super Junior	Yoo Young-jin	Hero	Japanese	2013	
"Sweater & Jeans"	Super Junior-D&E	Seo Ji-yong; Meagan Cottone; Nathan Duvall; Mich Hansen; Daniel Davidsen; Peter Wallevik	The Beat Goes On	Korean	2015	
"Swing" (Korean ver.)	Super Junior-M	Kim Jin-ah; Seo Ji-eum; Daniel Caesar; Ludwig Lindell; Olof Lindskog; Casper	Swing (Korean edition)	Korean	2014	
"Swing (Sīhǒu)"†	Super Junior-M	Zhou Mi; Daniel Caesar; Ludwig Lindell; Olof Lindskog; Casper; ‡	Swing	Chinese	2014	
"Taewanmi (Perfection)" (Korean ver.)	Super Junior-M	Lee Won-geum; Mikkel Reme Sigvardt; Thomas Troelsen	Perfection (Repackaged and Korean edition)	Korean	2011	
"Taeyangeun Gadeuki (Red Sun)"	SM Town	Kenzie	2006 Summer SM Town	Korean	2006	
"Taiwanmei (Perfection)"	Super Junior-M	m.C.A.T; Mikkel Remee Sigvardt; Thomas Troelsen	Perfection (Japanese edition) and Hero	Japanese	2011	
"Take It Slow"	Super Junior-D&E	h.toyosaki; Onestar; Cho Hye-joon	Style	Japanese	2018	
"Tài Wánměi (Perfection)"†	Super Junior-M	Huang Tsu Yin; Mikkel Remee Sigvardt; Thomas Troelsen	Perfection	Chinese	2011	
"Te-wo-hutte"	Super Junior-D&E	SHOW; Wolf Kid	YOU&ME	Japanese	2024	
"Teenage Queen"	Donghae & Eunhyuk	Amon Hayashi; Tiffany Vartanyan; Calum Hood; Luke Hemmings; David Musumeci; Anthony Egizii	Ride Me	Japanese	2014	
"Ten Years"	Donghae & Eunhyuk ft. Luna of f(x)	Miyakei; Michael Stockwell; Weley Steed	Ride Me	Japanese	2014	
"Thank You"	Super Junior	Sung Nak-ho; Kim Jo-han	Don't Don	Korean	2007	
"The Beat Goes On"	Super Junior-D&E	Jo Yoon-kyung; The Underdogs; Patrick J. Que Smith; Dewan Whitemore; Adonis Shropshire	The Beat Goes On	Korean	2015	
"The Crown"†	Super Junior	Lee Yoo-jin; danke; Jake K; Nick Kaelar; Andy Love	Time Slip	Korean	2019	
"The Lucky Ones	Super Junior	Seo Ji-eum; Jin Ri; Lee Paul Williams; Jörgen Kjell Elofsson; Anton Martensson	Play	Korean	2017	
"The Night Chicago Died"	Super Junior-K.R.Y.	Murray Mitch; Peter Callander	Hyena	Korean	2006	
"The One"	Super Junior-M	Huang De Jiang; Hong Suk	Me	Chinese	2008	
"This Is Love"†	Super Junior	Kim Ji-won; Cho Yoon-kyung; Kim Ji-hu; Park Seul-gi; Lola Fair; Nermin Harambasic	Mamacita	Korean	2014	
"This Is Love" (Stage ver.)	Super Junior	Kim Ji-won; Cho Yoon-kyung; Kim Ji-hu; Park Seul-gi; Lola Fair; Nermin Harambasic	This Is Love	Korean	2014	
"Tic! Toc!"	Super Junior	Cho Yoon-kyung; Michael Scott Hartung	2006 Winter SM Town–Snow Dream	Korean	2006	
"Too Many Beautiful Girls"	Super Junior	Kim In-hyung; Shin Jin-hye; Lee Seu-ran; Chris Young; Andy Jackson	Mamacita	Korean	2014	
"Traveler"†	Super Junior-K.R.Y.	Natsumi Kobayashi; Casa; Chicok; Nuplay	Non-album single	Japanese	2020	
"True Love"	Super Junior-M	Zhou Mi; Carl Utbult; Fredrik Hult; ‡	Perfection	Chinese	2011	
"Ttaenggyo (Danger)"†	Super Junior-D&E	Donghae; J-DUB; ‡	Danger	Korean	2019	
"Ttokttokttok (Knock Knock Knock)" (Studio ver.)†	Super Junior	ROZ	Super Show 3 – The 3rd Asia Tour Concert Album	Korean	2010	
"Ttottta Oppa (Oppa, Oppa)"†	Donghae & Eunhyuk	Team One Sound; Steve Greenberg	The Beat Goes On (Special edition)	Korean	2011	
"Tunnel"	Super Junior-M	Zhou Mi; Kenzie; Andrew Choi; ‡	Break Down	Chinese	2013	
"TUXEDO"	Super Junior	H.U.B.; JD Walker; Kelly Sheehan; Robert Mario Marchetti; Mauli Bonner	Hero	Japanese	2013	
"Twins (Knock Out)"†	Super Junior 05	Yoo Young-jin; Peer Astrom; Sven Anders Bagge; Reed Vertelney; Hector Wayne Anthony; Michael Berg Andersson	Twins	Korean	2005	
"Twisted"	Super Junior-D&E	Kim In-hyeong; CR Kim; SB; WON	606	Korean	2024	
"U"†	Super Junior	Taehoon; Ken Ingwersen; Kevin Simm	U	Korean	2006	
"U"†	Super Junior-M	Yi Zhen; Ken Ingwersen; Kevin Simm	Me	Chinese	2008	
"U" (Japanese version)	Super Junior	Ken Ingwersen; Kevin Simm	non-album song (Note: Bonus track for the promotional single "U/Twins")	Japanese	2008	
"U (Jiùshì Nǐ)" (Mandarin version)	Super Junior	Taehoon; Ken Ingwersen; Kevin Simm	U (Taiwan special edition)	Chinese	2007	
"Under The Sea"	SM Town	Howard Ashman; Alan Menken	2007 Summer SM Town–Fragile	Korean	2007	
"Urideurui Sarang (Our Love)"	Super Junior	Yoo Jae-ha	Don't Don	Korean	2007	
"Urideurui Sarang (Our Love)" (Drama ver.)	Super Junior	Yoo Jae-ha	Thirty Thousand Miles in Search of My Son OST	Korean	2007	
"Uriege (The Melody)"†	Super Junior	Leeteuk; Yesung; Min Young-jae; Niclas Kings; Didrik Thott; Andy Love; ‡	The Renaissance	Korean	2020	
"Uulhae (Gloomy)"	Super Junior-D&E	Donghae; J-DUB; ‡	Danger	Korean	2019	
"Victory"	Super Junior-D&E	Donghae; J-DUB; ‡	'Bout You	Korean	2018	
"Victory Korea"†	Super Junior	Park Seong-jin; Na Eui-hyun; Jeong Jin-seon; Hyeokseong	Dreams Come True OST	Korean	2010	
"Victory Korea (Uriminjok)" (OST ver.)	Super Junior	Park Seong-jin; Na Eui-hyun; Jeong Jin-seon; Hyeokseong	Dreams Come True OST	Korean	2010	
"Walkin'"	Super Junior	Misfit; Denzil Remedios; Kibwe Luke; Sharif Slater; Ryan Jhun	Mr. Simple	Korean	2011	
"Wanmijeokjaegyeon (Good Bye, My Love)"	Super Junior-M	Park Shi-yeon; DK4RG; Lee Sang-baek; Park Hae-moon; Park Hae-woon	Break Down (Korean edition)	Korean	2013	
"Watch Out"	Super Junior-D&E	Hwang Yu-bin; Rick Bridges; Tova Litvin; Tyler Shamy; Spencer Sutherland; Keaton Stromberg; Lugie Gonzalez; Michael Polk	Danger	Korean	2019	
"Way"	Super Junior	HIKARI	Hero	Japanese	2012	
"Wán Měi De Zài Jián (Good Bye, My Love)"	Super Junior-M	Lin Yuan; Park Hae-moon; Park Hae-woon	Break Down	Chinese	2013	
"We Can"	Super Junior-K.R.Y.	Lee Seung-hwan; Hwang Seong-je	Devil	Korean	2015	
"What If"	Super Junior	Kwon Yoon-jung; Sean Syed Hosein; Dane Anthony Deviller; Jörgen Kjell Elofsson; Andrew G Goldmark	Sorry, Sorry	Korean	2009	
"When We Were Us (Aoku Hikaru Kisetsu)"	Super Junior-K.R.Y.	4Beontaja; Hasegawa	non-album song (Note: B-side track for the single "Traveler")	Japanese	2020	
"Where Is She?"	Super Junior-D&E	Natsumi Kobayashi; Steve Mac; Claude Kelly	Present	Japanese	2015	
"White Love (Seukijangeso)"	Super Junior	Lee Seung-ho; Joo Young-hoon; Melange	The Road: Celebration	Korean	2022	
"WINE"	Super Junior-D&E	AKIRA; DWB; Will Simms	Present	Japanese	2015	
"Wings"†	Super Junior-D&E	Natsumi Kobayashi; Coach&Sendo; Andrew Choi	Non-album single	Japanese	2020	
"Wonder Boy"†	Super Junior	Park Jun-ha; Groovie. K	Attack on the Pin-Up Boys OST	Korean	2007	
"Wonder Boy" (Japanese ver.)	Super Junior	Sara Sakurai; Kim Sung-soo	Hero	Japanese	2013	
"Wonderland"	Donghae & Eunhyuk	AKIRA; Donghae; Team One Sound; ‡	Present	Japanese	2014	
"Wow! Wow!! Wow!!!"	Super Junior	MEG.ME; Christofer Erixon; Josef Melin	Star	Japanese	2018	
"Wǒ Bào Zhe Wǒ (In My Arms)"	Super Junior-M	Ma Zhi Yong; Ding Dou Dou	Me	Chinese	2008	
"Wǒ De Èr Fēn Zhīyī (Full of Happiness)"	Super Junior-M	Ma Zhi Yong; Jung Yong-jin	Me	Chinese	2008	
"Wǒ Tǐng Nǐ (Stand Up)"	Super Junior-M	Tina Wang; Eric Lidbom; Herbie Crichlow	Break Down	Chinese	2013	
"Wú Suǒwèi (My Love For You)"	Super Junior-M	Gen Neo; NoizeBank	Swing	Chinese	2014	
"Xīfēng De Huà"	Super Junior-M	Liao Fu Shu; Huang Zi	Perfection (Repackaged edition)	Chinese	2011	
"Xìngfú Wēi Tián (Love Is Sweet)"	Super Junior-M	Vincent Fang; Jay Chou	Perfection	Chinese	2011	
"Y"	Super Junior	Donghae; Chance; Super D; ‡	Mr. Simple	Korean	2011	
"Yeohaeng (A Short Journey)"	Super Junior	Eunhyuk; Donghae	Bonamana (Version C)	Korean	2010	
"Yeoreumbam (I Love It)"	Super Junior-D&E	Kim Bo-eum; Jo Yu-ri; Kyler Niko; Pete Kirtley; Oliver Leonard	'Bout You	Korean	2018	
"Yeppeo Boyeo (Girlfriend)"	Super Junior	Lee Seu-ran; Eunhyuk; DAVII; ‡	Play	Korean	2017	
"Yì Fēn Hòu (After a Minute)"	Super Junior-M	Huang Zhen Ying; Annakid; Kim Jin-hwan	Swing	Chinese	2014	
"Yohangeul Ttonayo"	SM Town	Ha Ji-young; Cho Yong-pil	2007 Summer SM Town–Fragile	Korean	2007	
"Yoriwang (Cooking? Cooking!)"†	Super Junior-H	ROZ	Cooking? Cooking!	Korean	2008	
"You&Me"†	Super Junior-D&E	toyosaki; Donghae; Virgo; 17; ber.ryko; Kim Jun-tae; Lee Jae-jun; ‡	YOU&ME	Japanese	2024	
"You Are The One"	Super Junior 05	Kenzie; Michael Abatzidis; Kathy Cantaluppi	Twins	Korean	2005	
"You Don't Go"†	Super Junior-D&E	AKIRA; Eric Scullin; Rodnae "Chikk" Bell; Hyuk Shin; Stephen "WonderBoy" Stahl; MRey	Style	Japanese	2017	
"You're My Endless Love (Malhajamyeon)"	Super Junior	Kim Young-hoo; Kwon Yoon-jung	Don't Don	Korean	2007	
"Yuē Dìng (with Siwon, Zhou Mi, Ryeowook, Kyuhyun)"†	Super Junior-D&E	Donghae; Zhou Mi; Kim Jun-tae; jelly; ‡	Yuē Dìng	Chinese	2024	
"ZERO"†	Super Junior-D&E	Donghae; J-DUB; PixelWave; ‡	Countdown	Korean	2021	
"ZERO" (English ver.)	Super Junior-D&E	Curtis Richardson; Adien Lewis; Donghae; J-DUB; PixelWave; ‡	Countdown	English	2021	
"Zhè Yì Miǎo (The Moment)"	Super Junior-M	Qi Cheng; Park Jun-su; Choi Sung-kwan	Me	Chinese	2008	
"Zhìshǎo Hái Yǒu Nǐ"	Super Junior-M	Lin Xi; Davy Chan	Me	Chinese	2008	

== Live recordings ==
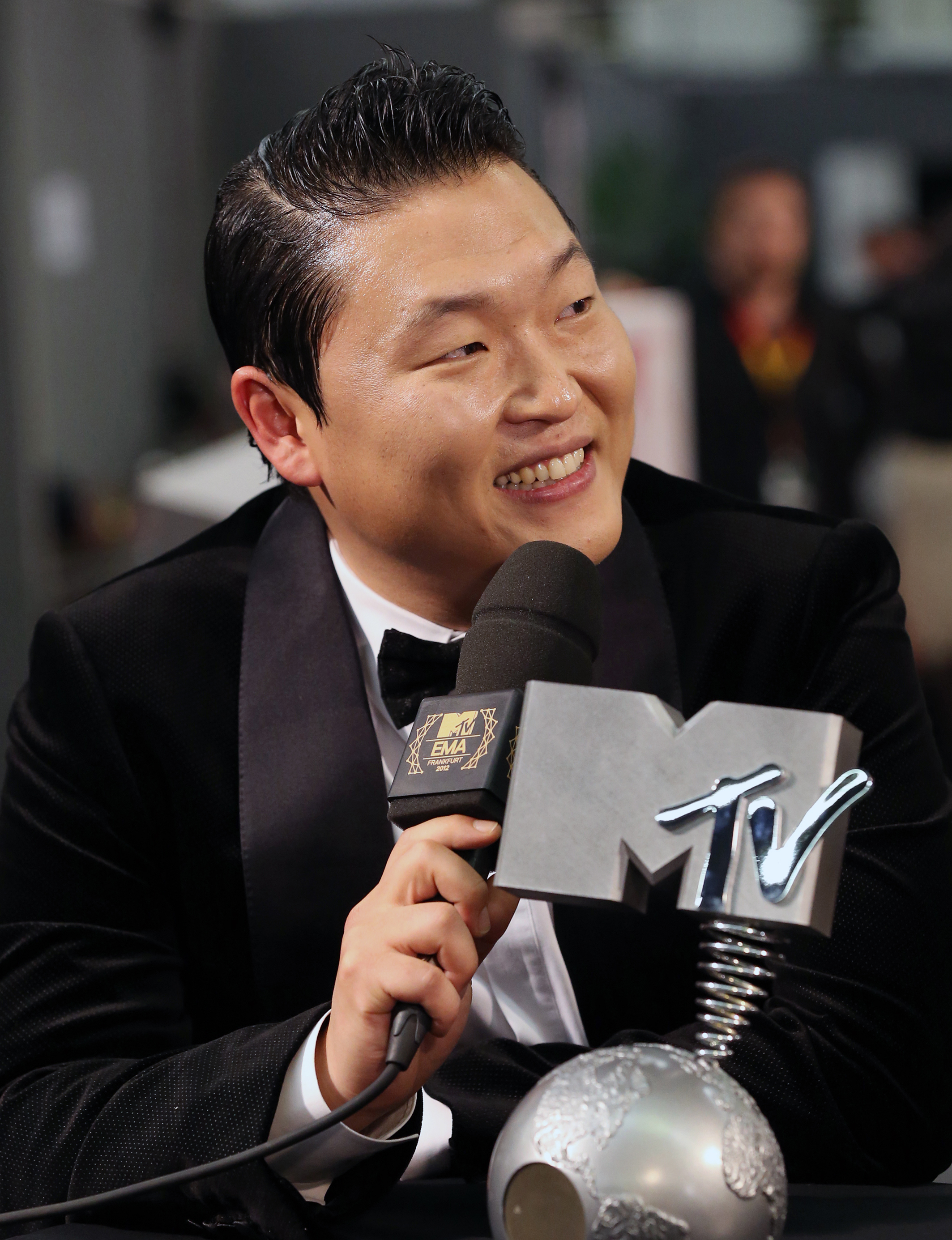
Psy's song "Champion" was covered by Super Junior's member Shindong in Super Show 3 – The 3rd Asia Tour Concert Album

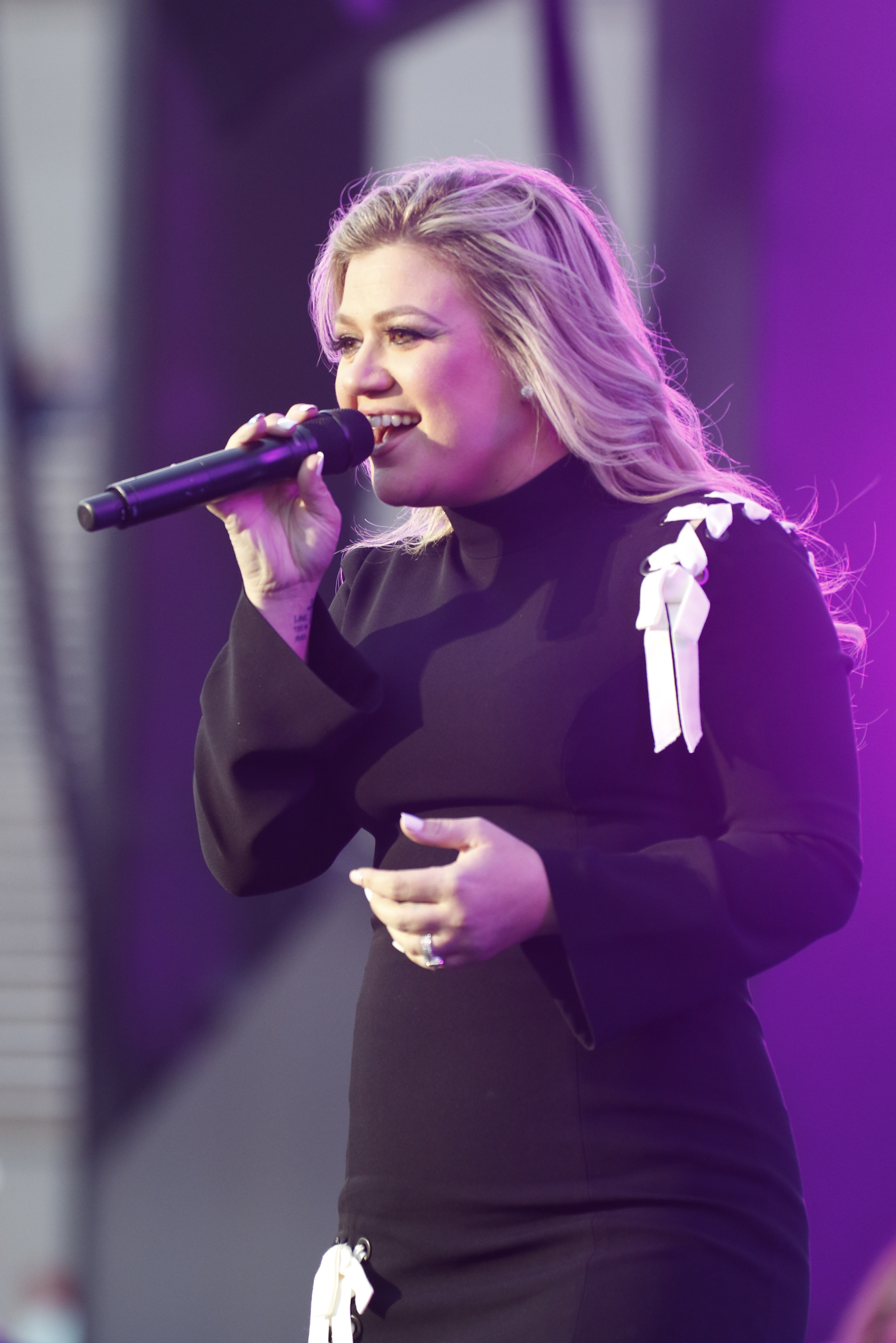
"Because of You" from Super Show 4 – Super Junior World Tour Concert Album is co-written and originally sung by Kelly Clarkson

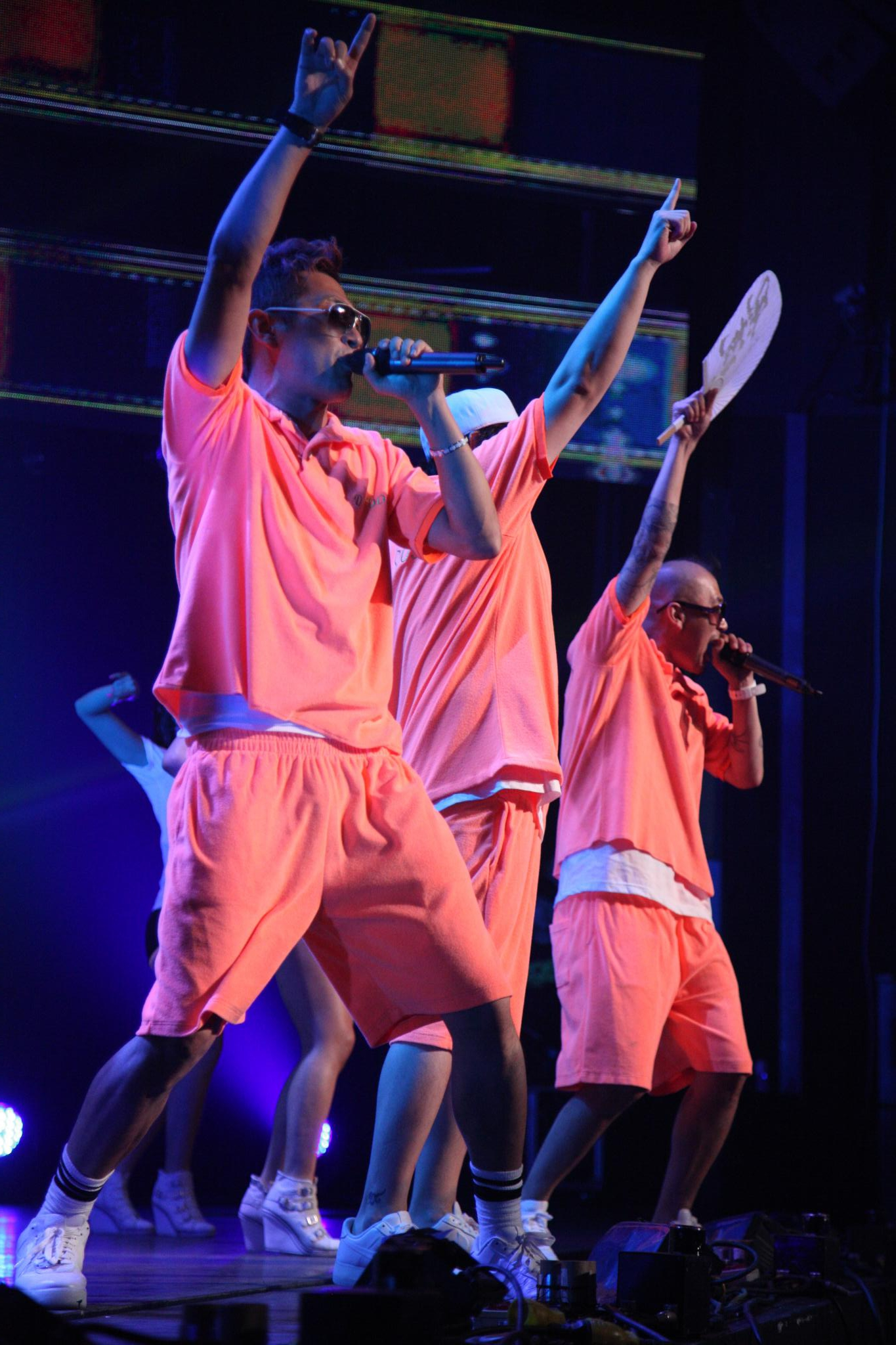
Super Junior's member Kangin sings the mashup of DJ Doc's songs "Doc Wa Chumeul" and "Run To You" in The 2nd Asia Tour Concert Album Super Show 2

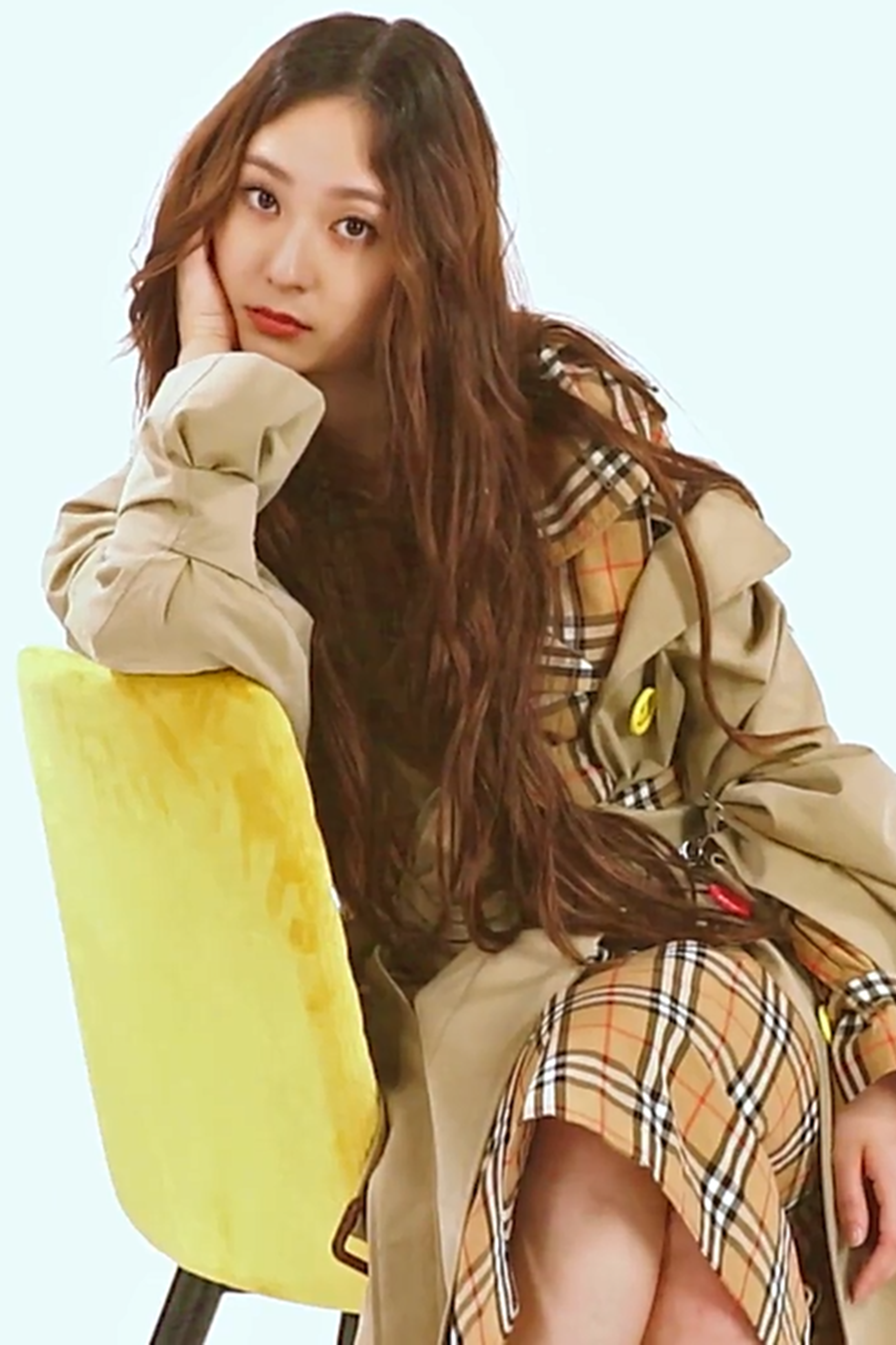
Krystal appears as featured artist in "Aidori Heeojineun Bangbeop" from Super Show 3 – The 3rd Asia Tour Concert Album

Key
‡	Indicates songs that were partially written by the band members
Indicates songs that were entirely written by the band members	Indicates songs that were entirely written by the band members

Name of song, featured performers, writers, originating album, language of song and year released.
Title	Artist(s)	Writer(s)	Album	Language	Year	Ref.
"7 Nyeonganui Sarang"	Kyuhyun	Yoo Young-seok	The 2nd Asia Tour Concert Album Super Show 2	Korean	2009	
"A-Oh!" (Korean ver.)	Super Junior	Lee Seu-ran; Alexander Sean Michael; Nadir Benkahla; Saeed Molavi	Super Show 5 – Super Junior World Tour Concert Album	Korean	2015	
"Aidori Heeojineun Bangbeop"	Heechul ft. Krystal of f(x)	Heechul; Yoo Dae-joon; ‡	Super Show 3 – The 3rd Asia Tour Concert Album	Korean	2011	
"Asian Freak Show"	Super Junior	Yoo Han-jin	The 1st Asia Tour Concert Album Super Show	Korean	2008	
"Baby"	Henry Lau	Justin Bieber; Christopher "Tricky" Stewart; Terius Nash; Christopher Bridges; Christina Milian	Super Show 4 – Super Junior World Tour Concert Album	English	2013	
"Baby Baby"	Sungmin	Lee Chi-yu	The 2nd Asia Tour Concert Album Super Show 2	Korean	2009	
"Beautiful"	Donghae	Donghae; Kim Tae-sung; ‡	The 2nd Asia Tour Concert Album Super Show 2	Korean	2009	
"Because of You"	Zhou Mi	Kelly Clarkson; David Hodges; Ben Moody	Super Show 4 – Super Junior World Tour Concert Album	English	2013	
"Chaempieon (Champion)"	Shindong	Harold Faltermeyer	Super Show 3 – The 3rd Asia Tour Concert Album	Korean	2011	
"Chenyeom"	Yesung	Lee Young-hyun	The 2nd Asia Tour Concert Album Super Show 2	Korean	2009	
"Cheoeum Neukkim Geudaero"	Kyuhyun	Kim Kwang-jin; Lee So-ra	The 1st Asia Tour Concert Album Super Show	Korean	2008	
"Dear. Two"	Eunhyuk	MQ; Eunhyuk; Shaun; Shim Jae-won; ‡	Super Show 6 – Super Junior World Tour Concert Album	Korean	2015	
"Do-Re-Mi"	Super Junior	Richard Rodgers; Oscar Hammerstein II	Super Show 4 – Super Junior World Tour Concert Album	English	2013	
"Doc Wa Chumeul + Run To You"	Kangin	Kim Chang-ryul; Park Hae-won; Lee Ha-neul; Frank Farian; Park Hae-moon	The 2nd Asia Tour Concert Album Super Show 2	Korean	2009	
"Don't Don" (Rearranged)	Super Junior ft. Trax	Yoo Young-jin; Kim Sung-soo	Super Show 3 – The 3rd Asia Tour Concert Album	Korean	2011	
"Fantastic"	Henry Lau	Kenzie; Will Simms	Super Show 6 – Super Junior World Tour Concert Album	Korean	2015	
"Gee"	Super Junior	Ahn Myung-won; Kim Young-deuk; E-TRIBE	The 2nd Asia Tour Concert Album Super Show 2	Korean	2009	
"Go" (Korean ver.)	Super Junior	Henry Lau; Lee Hyo-min; Zhou Mi; Han Ha-gyeong; Nallas Niel; Gen Neo; ‡	Super Show 5 – Super Junior World Tour Concert Album	Korean	2015	
"Gobaek (Confession)" (Korean ver.)	Super Junior	Lee Jae-myeong	Super Show 3 – The 3rd Asia Tour Concert Album	Korean	2011	
"Gongjeon (Mìngyùn Xiān: Destiny)" (Korean ver.)	Super Junior	Kim Jin-hwan	Super Show 4 – Super Junior World Tour Concert Album	Korean	2013	
"Hon (Hon)"	Heechul	Heechul; Kim Jung-mo; ‡	The 2nd Asia Tour Concert Album Super Show 2	Korean	2009	
"Honey"	Leeteuk	Park Jin-young	The 2nd Asia Tour Concert Album Super Show 2	Korean	2009	
"How Am I Supposed to Live Without You"	Sungmin, Ryeowook, Kyuhyun and Zhou Mi	Doug James; Michael Bolton	Super Show 5 – Super Junior World Tour Concert Album	English	2015	
"I Wanna Love You"	Donghae and Eunhyuk	Chance	Super Show 3 – The 3rd Asia Tour Concert Album	Korean	2011	
"Inhyeong (Doll)"	Leeteuk and Yesung	Kangta	The 1st Asia Tour Concert Album Super Show	Korean	2008	
"Insomnia"	Ryeowook	Craig David; Jim Beanz	The 2nd Asia Tour Concert Album Super Show 2	English	2009	
"Isn't She Lovely"	Kyuhyun	Stevie Wonder	Super Show 4 – Super Junior World Tour Concert Album	English	2013	
"Itji Marayo (Don't Forget Me)"	Shindong	Kim Do-hoon; Choi Kab-won; Lee Hyun-sueng	Super Show 6 – Super Junior World Tour Concert Album	Korean	2015	
"Jachebalgwang Boseongminam Lee Hyuk-jae"	Eunhyuk	Eunhyuk; Henry Lau	Super Show 4 – Super Junior World Tour Concert Album	Korean	2013	
"Kiss Me"	Yesung	Moth Jacob; Negrijn Thomas	Super Show 4 – Super Junior World Tour Concert Album	English	2013	
"Looking For The Day"	Siwon	Unknown	Super Show 3 – The 3rd Asia Tour Concert Album	English	2011	
"Meokji (Gray Paper)"	Yesung	Kangta	Super Show 5 – Super Junior World Tour Concert Album	Korean	2015	
"Moves Like Jagger"	Ryeowook	Adam Levine; Benny Blanco; Ammar Malik; Shellback	Super Show 4 – Super Junior World Tour Concert Album	English	2013	
"Muldeureo"	Sungmin	Jeong Ji-chan	Super Show 4 – Super Junior World Tour Concert Album	Korean	2013	
"My Everything"	Donghae	Justin Jeffre; Arnthor Birgisson; Anders Bagge; Nick Lachey	The 1st Asia Tour Concert Album Super Show	English	2008	
"Nae Yoksimi Manatta (Tài Tānxīn)"	Zhou Mi	Choi Hee-joon; Hwang Sung-chan; Cho Eun-hee; Im Heun Yup	Super Show 6 – Super Junior World Tour Concert Album	Chinese	2015	
"Naega Noe Gyote Jamsi Saratttaneun Gol (That I Was Once Your Side)"	Kyuhyun	Yoo Hee-yeol	Super Show 3 – The 3rd Asia Tour Concert Album	Korean	2011	
"Naui Saenggak, Neoui Gieok (My Thoughts, Your Memories)"	Kyuhyun	Changmin; Kyuhyun; Hwang Sung-je; ‡	Super Show 6 – Super Junior World Tour Concert Album	Korean	2015	
"Neo Animyeon Andwae (It Has To Be You)"	Yesung	Park Joon-soo; Lee Yoon-jong	Super Show 3 – The 3rd Asia Tour Concert Album	Korean	2011	
"Nothing On You"	Leeteuk	Philip Lawrence; B.o.B; Bruno Mars; Ari Levine	Super Show 6 – Super Junior World Tour Concert Album	English	2015	
"One Love"	Yesung, Eunhyuk, Ryeowook and Kyuhyun	Thomas Charles La Verdi; Daniel Pandher; Jay Pea; Eunhyuk; ‡	The 1st Asia Tour Concert Album Super Show	Korean	2008	
"Ruksembureukeu (Luxembourg)"	Kangin, Shindong and Leeteuk	Captain Rock	The 1st Asia Tour Concert Album Super Show	Korean	2008	
"Sangsim (Heartbroken)"	Kangin	Hong Jae-seon	Super Show 6 – Super Junior World Tour Concert Album	Korean	2015	
"Saranghandaneun Heunhan Mal (Never Got to Say That I Love You)"	Ryeowook	Lee Seung-min; Cho Kyu-man	Super Show 6 – Super Junior World Tour Concert Album	Korean	2015	
"Seoreunjeueume (Around 30s)"	Kangin	Kang Seung-won	Super Show 5 – Super Junior World Tour Concert Album	Korean	2015	
"She"	Leeteuk	Charles Aznavour; Herbert Kretzmer	Super Show 4 – Super Junior World Tour Concert Album	English	2013	
"So Cold"	Eunhyuk, Donghae, Siwon and Henry	Henry Lau; Eunhyuk; Nallas Neil; Gen Neo; ‡	Super Show 5 – Super Junior World Tour Concert Album	Korean	2015	
"Syupeomaen (Superman)"	Super Junior-T	PS Young-joon; DK	The 2nd Asia Tour Concert Album Super Show 2	Korean	2009	
"Ttokttokttok (Knock Knock Knock)"	Super Junior	ROZ	Super Show 3 – The 3rd Asia Tour Concert Album	Korean	2011	
"Twinkle, Twinkle, Little Star"	Shindong	Jane Taylor	Super Show 4 – Super Junior World Tour Concert Album	English	2013	
"Who Am I"	Siwon	Mark Hall	The 2nd Asia Tour Concert Album Super Show 2	English	2009	
"Y.M.C.A."	Super Junior	Jacques Morali; Victor Willis; Henri Belolo	The 1st Asia Tour Concert Album Super Show	English	2008	
"Yasaengma (Wild Horse)"	Siwon	DK	Super Show 6 – Super Junior World Tour Concert Album	Korean	2015	
"Your Grace Is Enough"	Siwon	Matt Maher	Super Show 4 – Super Junior World Tour Concert Album	English	2013	

== Unreleased songs ==
Key
‡	Indicates songs that were partially written by the band members

Name of song, featured performers, writers, language of song and song details.
Title	Artist(s)	Writer(s) (Note: Songwriters are adapted from Korea Music Copyright Association (KOMCA))	Language	Detail	Ref.
"Blue World" (Korean ver.)	Super Junior	Stephan Elfgren; Anders Wigelius	Korean	First performed during SMTOWN Week "Treasure Island" concert at Korea International Exhibition Center (KINTEX) in 2013	
"Gyeoul Ae (Winter Love)"	Super Junior-D&E	Jinoo; Peter Hyun; Eunhyuk; Donghae; Young Sky; ‡	Korean	Performed at the Super Junior 10th Anniversary Special Event Super Camp in 2015, as a goodbye song towards fans prior to Donghae's and Eunhyuk's mandatory military enlistment	
"Hairspray"	Super Junior	Peter Hyun; Leeteuk; Young Sky; ‡	Korean	Performed at the Super Show 8 concert tour and its performance was included in the video album Super Junior World Tour Super Show 8 released in 2020	
"Super Ranger"	Super Junior	Kevin Oppa	Korean	The song was used as background music at the Super Show 7 concert tour in between 2017 and 2018 and was included in its respective video albums (Note: Although Super Junior did not sing the song in the concert tour, they are credited as the performer on Korea Music Copyright Association website)	
"The D&E"	Super Junior-D&E	Eunhyuk; Jake K; ‡	Korean	Performed at The D&E concert tour in 2019.	
