= Cooking? Cooking! =

EP by Super Junior-H
- Released: June 5, 2008
- Recorded: 2008
- Studio: Coo (Seoul); SM Blue Ocean (Seoul); SM Concert Hall (Seoul); SM Yellow Tail (Seoul)
- Genre: K-pop; dance; novelty
- Language: Korean
- Label: SM
- Producer: Lee Soo-man

Singles from Cooking? Cooking!
- 1. "Cooking? Cooking!" Released: June 5, 2008; 2. "Pajama Party" Released: August 4, 2008

Cooking? Cooking! (요리왕; Yoriwang), is the only EP by South Korean boy band Super Junior-H, sub-unit of Super Junior. It was released on June 5, 2008, by SM Entertainment. The mini album sold close to 2,000 copies within one day of release. It was also released in Taiwan by Avex Taiwan on July 11, 2008.

== Background ==
Super Junior-H is Super Junior's fourth official sub-unit after Super Junior-K.R.Y, Super Junior-T, and Super Junior-M. They debuted on June 7, 2008, with the performance of their first promotional dance single, "Cooking? Cooking!", at the 2008 Dream Concert.

The subgroup released their second single, "Pajama Party" on August 3, 2008, on SBS's Popular Songs. The music video was released on August 4, 2008. "Pajama Party" promotions only lasted a month, and promotions for the EP officially ended on September 7, 2008.

== Composition ==
Their EP contains a total of five tracks, all of which display exhilarating music with cheerful dances, bringing happiness to listeners. Bubbly and blissful with playful and chatty lyrics, the title track "Cooking? Cooking!" is widely known to be reserved as the "Best Summer Song of the Year" by SM Entertainment. The lyrics deal of a fun episode that took place while eating the food a girlfriend cooked.

Other tracks, such as "Pajama Party", "You&I", and "Sunny" are other samples of the same bubbly genre, however, each song differ in style because of the unique sounds that are incorporated into each different track.

"You&I" is influenced by modern jazz/swing music while "Sunny" is an influence from retro, disco dance. The last track, "Good Luck!!" is a medium-tempo ballad with vocal harmonization, which also includes a brief a cappella performance by the members.

The EP's jacket photoshoots are also included in the album, compressing them into a 28-page long booklet. The themes of the photoshoots contain a variety of different themes, such as a fun pajama party, a pillow fight, and a cooking party.

== Track listing ==
Cooking? Cooking! track listing
No.	Title	Lyrics	Music	Arrangement	Length
1.	"Cooking? Cooking!" (요리왕; yoliwang; lit. 'Cooking king')	Roz	Roz	Lee Yong-min	3:43
2.	"Pajama Party" (파자마 파티; pajama pati)	Lee Seung-ho	Park Hae-won	Park Hae-won	3:32
3.	"You&I" (둘이; dul-i; lit. 'Two people')	Sung Jin; Ahn Eun-jin; Kwon Hyuk-sung	Lee Hee-sung; Sung Jin	Sung Jin	4:45
4.	"Sunny" (꿀단지; kkuldanji; lit. 'Honey pot')	Kim Jung-bae	Kenzie	Kenzie	3:24
5.	"Good Luck!!" (잘해봐; jalhaebwa; lit. 'Do you best')	Roz	Roz	Roz	3:33

== Charts ==
=== Monthly album sales (South Korea) ===
Derived from both offline and online sales.

Month	1 (June)
Position	4
Sales	24,013
Total	24,013

=== Chart positions ===
==== South Korea ====
Chart	Country	Peak position	Notes
Hanteo Charts	South Korea	1	
MIAK K-pop Charts	South Korea	4	
G-Music Combo Charts	Taiwan	4	
G-Music J-Pop Charts	Taiwan	1	11–17 July 2008; 21.02% sales

== Release history ==
Release history for Cooking? Cooking!
Region	Date	Format	Label	Ref
South Korea	June 5, 2008	CD	SM	—
Various	June 5, 2008	Digital download; streaming	SM	—
Taiwan	July 11, 2008	CD	Avex Taiwan	
Taiwan	September 12, 2008	CD; DVD	Avex Taiwan	
