= Super Junior-H =

Subgroup of the South Korean boy band Super Junior

- Also known as: Super Junior-Happy; SJ-Happy
- Origin: Seoul, South Korea
- Genres: K-pop; bubblegum pop; dance-pop; Novelty
- Years active: 2008
- Labels: SM; Label SJ; Avex Asia
- Spinoff of: Super Junior
- Members: Leeteuk; Yesung; Shindong; Sungmin; Eunhyuk
- Past members: Kangin
- Website: Official website

Super Junior-H (Korean: 슈퍼주니어-해피, also known as Super Junior-Happy or SJ-Happy), is the fourth official sub-unit of South Korean boy band Super Junior with consists of five Super Junior members: Leeteuk, Yesung, Shindong, Sungmin, and Eunhyuk. The unit is specialized of Bubblegum pop and Novelty-based sound, they officially debuted on June 5, 2008 with their only EP Cooking? Cooking! and only active in that year.

== History ==
=== 2008: Cooking? Cooking! and Pajama Party ===
By 2008, all of the Super Junior members have already been a member of at least one subgroup except Kibum. Super Junior-Happy consists of every previous member from Super Junior-T except Heechul, who is replaced by Yesung. Super Junior-Happy made an unofficial debut performance on May 3, 2008 at the Power Concert although they had not formally introduced themselves as the subgroup at the time.

On May 30, 2008, SM Entertainment released the official announcement of the subgroup through Newsen. The subgroup's only EP, Cooking? Cooking!, was released on June 5, 2008. The music video of their eponymous debut single was released on that same day.

Super Junior-H debuted on June 7, 2008, performing their first single, "Cooking? Cooking!" at the 2008 Dream Concert. On the day before their debut, the subgroup held their first sign fan meeting to celebrate the success of the sales of Cooking? Cooking! On the morning of June 6, over thousands of fans lined up for tickets to the fan meet, overcrowding the streets. Close to 10,000 copies were sold by the first week of release. According to the Music Industry Association of Korea, the EP sold 27,122 by the end of August and was ranked fifth in the monthly charts.

Super Junior-H performed their second single, "Pajama Party" on August 3, 2008, on SBS's Popular Songs. The music video was released on August 4, 2008. "Pajama Party" promotions only lasted a month, and promotions for the EP officially ended on September 7, 2008.

== Discography ==
Super Junior-Happy discography
- Extended plays: 1
- Singles: 1
- Music videos: 3

=== EPs ===
Title	Details	Peak chart positions		Sales
Title	Details	KOR Gaon	KOR MIAK	Sales
Cooking? Cooking!	Released: June 5, 2008; Label: SM Entertainment; Format: CD	5	4	KOR: 20,978

=== Singles ===
- Pajama Party (2008)

== Videography ==
Year	Track	Album	Released
2008	"Cooking? Cooking!"	Cooking? Cooking!	June 10
2008	"Pajama Party"	Cooking? Cooking!	August 4
2010	"Victory Korea"	Victory Korea	May 24

== Awards and nominations ==
=== Mnet Asian Music Awards ===
Year	Nominee / work	Award	Result
2008
2008	Super Junior-Happy	Artist of the Year	Nominated
2008	"Cooking? Cooking!"	Song of the Year	Nominated
2008	Cooking? Cooking!	Best Dance Performance	Nominated
2008	Super Junior-Happy	Auction Netizen Popularity	Nominated
2008	Super Junior-Happy	Netizen and Mobile Popularity	Nominated
