= B.A.D. (song) =

Single by Super Junior-D&E

from the EP Bad Blood
- Language: Korean; Japanese
- A-side: "Wings"
- Released: September 3, 2020
- Recorded: 2020
- Studio: Doobdoob (Seoul)
- Genre: Electronic hip-hop
- Length: 3:20
- Label: SM; Label SJ; Dreamus
- Composers: Lee Dong-hae; J-DUB
- Lyricists: Lee Dong-hae; J-DUB
- Producer: J-DUB

Super Junior-D&E singles chronology
"Danger" (2019)	"B.A.D." (2020)	"No Love" (2020)

Music video
- "B.A.D." on YouTube

"B.A.D." is a song recorded by South Korean duo Super Junior-D&E for their fourth Korean EP, Bad Blood. It was released as the lead single of the EP on September 3, 2020, by SM Entertainment and Label SJ, with Dreamus handling the distribution.

== Background ==
On August 24, 2020, Label SJ announced that the duo will have a comeback through the release of Bad Blood, after a year and five months since Danger. The EP plans to showcase deadly music and visuals never seen before. Four days later, the track list of the EP was revealed with "B.A.D." serving as the lead single, co-written by member Donghae and J-DUB. On the 31st, the duo uploaded a teaser for the song's music video. The song was released alongside the music video and the parent EP on September 3.

== Composition ==
"B.A.D." is an electronic hip-hop song co-written by Donghae and J-DUB, with the latter serving as co-composer and the arranger. The second half of the song features a Motown Funk-style ryhthm change. The song was composed in the key of G Minor with the tempo of 113 BPM.

The lyrics express the appearance of a beautiful opposite through the irony of the word "bad", according to Donghae. Eunhyuk added that the song was designed to be "addictive" and keep the listeners humming it even if they just listen to it once.

== Live performance ==
The duo debuted the song on Inkigayo on September 13. The song was later featured in the setlist Super Junior's sixth world tour concert Super Show 9: Road.

== Chart ==
Chart (2020)	Peak position
South Korea (Gaon)	129

== Credits ==
Credits adapted from the EP's liner notes.

Studio

- Doobdoob Studio – recording, digital editing
- SM SSAM Studio – engineered for mix
- SM Blue Cup Studio – mixing
- 821 Sound – mastering

Personnel

- Label SJ – executive producer
- SM Entertainment – executive supervisor
- Lee Soo-man – producer
- Tak Young-jun – production director
- Yoo Young-jin – music and sound supervisor
- J-DUB – producer, lyrics, composition, arrangement, programming, synthesizer, vocal directing
- Super Junior-D&E – vocals
  - Lee Dong-hae – lyrics, composition, background vocals, vocal directing
- Kim Hyun-gon – recording
- Eugune Kwon – recording
- Kang Eun-ji – engineered for mix, digital editing,
- Jang Woo-young – digital editing
- Jung Eui-sok – mixing
- Kwon Nam-woo – mastering

== Release history ==
Release history for "B.A.D."
Region	Date	Version	Format	Label
South Korea	September 3, 2020	Korean	Digital download; streaming	SM; Label SJ; Dreamus
Various	September 3, 2020	Korean	Digital download; streaming	SM; Label SJ
Japan	November 24, 2020	Japanese	Digital download; streaming	Avex Trax
Various	November 24, 2020	Japanese	Digital download; streaming	Avex Trax
