= Bad Blood (EP) =

- "Cold Blood" version cover

EP by Super Junior-D&E
- Released: September 3, 2020
- Recorded: 2020
- Studio: Doobdoob (Seoul); Golden Bell Tree Sound (Seoul); SM LVYIN (Seoul); SM Yellow Tail (Seoul)
- Genre: Hip house; hip-hop; dance
- Length: 18:02; 25:13 (Bad Liar - repackage)
- Language: Korean
- Label: SM; Label SJ; Dreamus
- Producer: Lee Soo-man; J-DUB; Jvke; Moonshine; OUOW; Peder Etholm Idsoe; WithRu; Zac Lawson; ZigZag Note

Super Junior-D&E chronology
Danger (2019)	Bad Blood (2020)	Countdown (2021)

Singles from Bad Blood
- 1. "B.A.D." Released: September 3, 2020

Singles from Bad Liar
- 1. "No Love" Released: September 28, 2020

Music video
- "B.A.D." on YouTube "No Love" on YouTube

Bad Blood (stylized as BAD BLOOD) is the fourth Korean EP by Super Junior-D&E, a subgroup of the boy band Super Junior. The album was released on September 3, 2020, under SM Entertainment and Label SJ. The EP contains five tracks, with the repackaged version entitled Bad Liar containing two more tracks, bringing the latter with seven tracks in total.

== Background ==
On August 4, 2020, the group announced that they would make a comeback by releasing their third Korean extended play release, following their 2019 release of Danger. The news was confirmed by Label SJ. On August 18, it was announced that the album would be named Bad Blood with September 3 as its scheduled release date. On August 20, teaser photos of Donghae and Eunhyuk were released. In August 2020, the jacket film of the album was released on YouTube. On August 25, individual teaser photos of Donghae were released, along with the news that the album will come in three variants: "Cold Blood", "Hot Blood", and "Balance." On August 26, individual teaser photos of Eunhyuk were released with SM Entertainment claiming that Eunhyuk was involved in writing one of the tracks in the upcoming album.

On September 3, the album was officially released with the re-released special edition of the Bad Blood album, called Bad Liar was released on September 28 with 2 additional tracks: "No Love" and "What Is Your Name?" the latter track featured their bandmate Shindong.

== Composition ==
The album is influenced by hip hop and dance music.

"B.A.D" is described as an electronic hip-hop genre and lyrically expresses the appearance of a beautiful opponent through the word 'BAD", the track was penned by Donghae.

The rock ballad, "To you, Tomorrow" has an electric guitar that amps up the song's vigor and a string melody that doubles the melancholy mood of the piano. The song's lyrics express a man's sadness at realizing how valuable the relationship was to him following their breakup. It was written by member Eunhyuk.

As one of the two new songs from the re-released album, "No Love" is classified into electronic dance music that has swing snares and flowy synths that blend in with different databases. Meanwhile, "What Is Your Name?" is a R&B song featuring their bandmate Shindong, with its lyrics describing sweetness and could be considered as a love song for the group's fanbase, "E.L.F. (Ever lasting friends)." Previously, they have performed the song together during Super Show 8: Infinite Time.

== Track listing ==
Credits are adapted from the official track listing.

Bad Blood version
No.	Title	Lyrics	Music	Arrangement	Length
1.	"B.A.D."	Donghae; J-DUB	Donghae; J-DUB	J-DUB	3:20
2.	"Contact"	Lim Soo-ran (lalala Studio); Lee Hyo-jae (lalala Studio)	Alexandra Veltri; Gabe Reali; Peder Etholm Idsoe	Peder Etholm Idsoe	3:17
3.	"To you, Tomorrow" (오늘이 지나고 나면; Oneuri jinago namyeon; 'After today passes')	Joni; Eunhyuk; ZigZag Note	ZigZag Note	ZigZag Note	4:04
4.	"Change" (變花; Biàn huā; "Flower")	OUOW	OUOW	OUOW	3:55
5.	"Off Line"	Yi Yi-jin (153/Joombas)	JVKE, 153/Joombas; Johnnie Harris IV; Zac Lawson; Brandon Hesson; Troshia Keeton; Jake Lawson	Jake Lawson; Zac Lawson; Troshia Keeton; Vurdell Miller	3:23
Total length:					18:02

Bad Liar – repackaged
No.	Title	Lyrics	Music	Arrangement	Length
1.	"No Love"	Rick Bridges; Bobii Lewis; Maxx Song; Moonshine	Bobii Lewis; Maxx Song; Moonshine	Moonshine	3:20
2.	"B.A.D."	Donghae; J-DUB	Donghae; J-DUB	J-DUB	3:20
3.	"Contact"	Lim Soo-ran (lalala Studio); Lee Hyo-jae (lalala Studio)	Alexandra Veltri; Gabe Reali; Peder Etholm Idsoe	Peder Etholm Idsoe	3:17
4.	"To you, Tomorrow" (오늘이 지나고 나면; Oneuri jinago namyeon; 'After today passes')	Joni; Eunhyuk; ZigZag Note	ZigZag Note	ZigZag Note	4:04
5.	"Change" (變花; Biàn huā; "Flower")	OUOW	OUOW	OUOW	3:55
6.	"Off Line"	Yi Yi-jin (153/Joombas)	JVKE, 153/Joombas; Johnnie Harris IV; Zac Lawson; Brandon Hesson; Troshia Keeton; Jake Lawson	Jake Lawson; Zac Lawson; Troshia Keeton; Vurdell Miller	3:23
7.	"What Is Your Name?" (너의 이름은; Neoui ireumeun; 'Your name is' featuring Shindong)	WithRu; Eunhyuk; Shindong	WithRu	WithRu	3:52
Total length:					25:13

== Charts ==
Chart performance for Bad Blood
Chart (2020)	Peak position
South Korean Albums (Circle)	2
Japan (Oricon)	12

Chart performance for Bad Liar
Chart (2020)	Peak position
South Korean Albums (Circle)	1

== Release history ==
Release history for Bad Blood
Region	Date	Version	Format	Label
South Korea	September 3, 2020	Bad Blood	CD	SM; Label SJ; Dreamus
South Korea	September 3, 2020	Cold Blood	CD	SM; Label SJ; Dreamus
South Korea	September 3, 2020	Hot Blood	CD	SM; Label SJ; Dreamus
Various	September 3, 2020	Bad Blood	Digital download; streaming	SM; Label SJ
South Korea	September 28, 2020	Bad Liar	CD	SM; Label SJ; Dreamus
Various	September 28, 2020	Bad Liar	Digital download; streaming	SM; Label SJ

== See also ==
- Super Junior-D&E discography
