= H.I.T. (soundtrack) =

Soundtrack album
- Released: April 6, 2007
- Genre: K-pop, R&B
- Language: Korean
- Label: Doremi Media

H.I.T. is the name of a soundtrack in 2007 for the MBC drama H.I.T. (히트), which stands for Homicide Investigation Unit.

The Super Junior members featured in this soundtrack are Yesung, Kang-in, Sungmin, Donghae, Ryeowook, and Kyuhyun.

== Track listing ==
1. Success - Super Junior
2. 통증 - Gummy (거미)
3. 그 사람 - JM
4. 마지막 사랑 - Kim Jung Min (김정민)
5. 그댈 위한 이별 - Lee Joon Kyung (이준경)
6. H.I.T. - Super Junior
7. H.I.T & Run
8. Human nature
9. Delightful Love
10. Instinct
11. Suorrowful Love
12. Urban Shock
13. So What
14. In A Heartbeat
15. Shotgun
16. Stormy Day
17. Arrest
