= Super Junior discography =

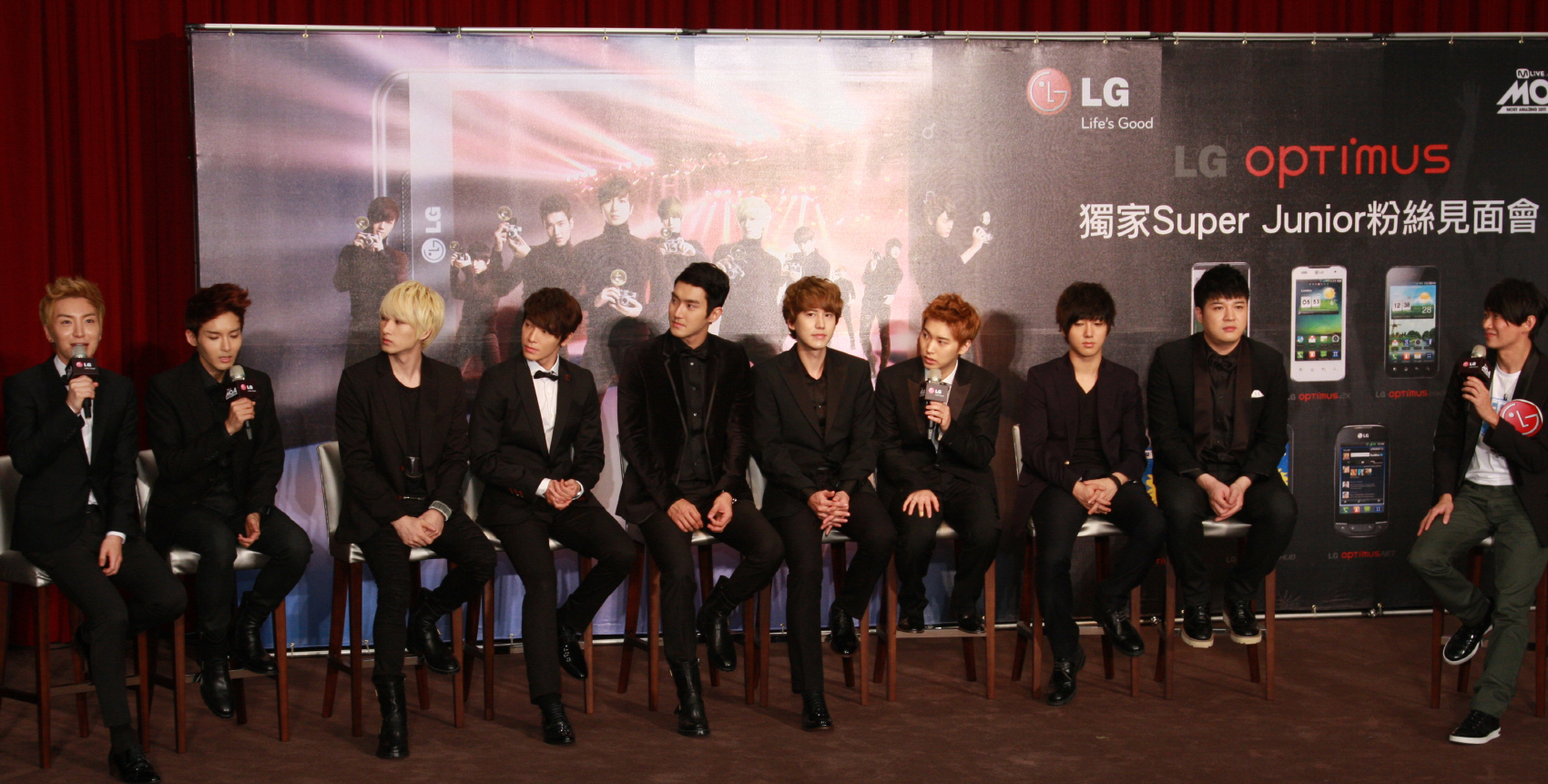
- Super Junior members at LG Optimus Super Junior Fan meeting at Chateau de Chine in Kaohsiung, Taiwan in November 2011.
- Studio albums: 12
- Extended plays: 2
- Live albums: 6
- Compilation albums: 2
- Singles: 41
- Video albums: 16
- Music videos: 51
- Soundtrack singles: 7
- Reissues: 9
- Single albums: 2

This is the discography of South Korean boy band, Super Junior, produced and managed by SM Entertainment. Super Junior has formed five sub-groups, which target different markets. Super Junior-T, for example, brought influence to the younger generation on trot-styled music, and Super Junior-M is credited as an influential group in the Chinese music industry.

The group has released twelve studio albums, two compilation albums, two extended plays, six live albums, and two single albums. The group also contributed in a total seven soundtracks and sixteen video albums. The releases below are music records officially released by Super Junior, although the group has also unofficially-released productions, such as opening themes for radio shows and television shows.

Their fourth album Bonamana is listed as the best-selling album of 2010 with 200,193 copies sold, and the repackaged version at ninth at 99,355 copies. On April 12, 2012, Gaon Chart announced that, up till the end of March 2012, their fifth studio album, Mr. Simple has sold a cumulative total of 548,164 copies in South Korea, the first to exceed half a million in four years in South Korea, hence making it the highest-selling album of their career.

== Albums ==
=== Studio albums ===
List of studio albums, with selected details, featuring members, chart positions, sales and certifications
Title	Album details	Peak chart positions							Sales	Certifications (Note: In April 2018, the Gaon Music Chart and the Korea Music Copyright Association introduced music recording certifications for albums, downloads and streaming numbers. Anything released prior to January 1, 2018, is unable to receive a certification.)
Title	Album details	KOR Circle	KOR RIAK (Note: The Recording Industry Association of Korea (RIAK) tracked physical album, EP, and singles sales and released a consolidated sales and ranking chart monthly from August 1998 to September 2008. It did not track digital-only sales.)	JPN	JPN Comb.	JPN Hot	US World	US Heat	Sales	Certifications
Super Junior 05	Released: December 5, 2005 (KOR); Label: SM Entertainment; Formats: CD, cassette, digital download, streaming	14 (Note: Released in 2005, the album entered the Gaon Album Chart in 2011 and peaked at number 14 for the week of August 7–13, 2011.)	3	—	—	—	—	—	KOR: 124,292	
Don't Don	Released: September 20, 2007 (KOR); Label: SM Entertainment; Formats: CD, cassette, DVD, digital download, streaming	17 (Note: Released in 2007, the album entered the Gaon Album Chart in 2012 and peaked at number 17 for the week of April 15–21, 2012.)	1	55	—	—	—	—	KOR: 199,735	
Sorry, Sorry	Released: March 12, 2009 (KOR); Label: SM Entertainment; Formats: CD, digital download, streaming	17 (Note: No chart tracking is available in 2009 but Sorry, Sorry was named as the top selling album of the year 2009. It entered Gaon Music Chart in 2011 and peaked at no 17)	—N/a (Note: Chart was discontinued in 2008)	33	—	—	—	—	KOR: 299,140	
Bonamana	Released: May 13, 2010 (KOR); Label: SM Entertainment; Formats: CD, DVD, digital download, streaming	1	—N/a	15	—	—	7	—	KOR: 216,518	
Mr. Simple	Released: August 3, 2011 (KOR); Label: SM Entertainment; Formats: CD, digital download, streaming	1	—N/a	17	—	—	3	41	KOR: 384,122; US: 5,000	
Sexy, Free & Single	Released: July 4, 2012 (KOR); Label: SM Entertainment; Formats: CD, digital download, streaming	1	—N/a	5	—	—	3	37	KOR: 370,496	
Hero	Released: July 24, 2013 (JPN); Label: Avex Trax; Formats: CD, DVD, digital download, streaming	10	—N/a	2	—	—	—	—	KOR: 3,495	RIAJ: Gold
Mamacita	Released: September 1, 2014 (KOR); Label: SM Entertainment; Formats: CD, digital download, streaming	1	—N/a	11	—	—	1	39	KOR: 279,656	
Devil	Released: July 16, 2015 (KOR); Label: SM Entertainment; Re-released (Magic): September 16, 2015; Formats: CD, digital download, streaming, Kihno	2	—N/a	8	—	11	—	—	KOR: 168,673; JPN: 33,401	
Play	Released: November 6, 2017 (KOR); Label: SM Entertainment; Formats: CD, digital download, streaming, Kihno	1	—N/a	16	—	9	3	15	KOR: 245,868; JPN: 23,419	
Time Slip	Released: October 14, 2019 (KOR); Label: SM Entertainment; Re-released (Timeline): November 6, 2019; Formats: CD, digital download, streaming	1	—N/a	7	6	9	9	—	KOR: 433,861; JPN: 24,677; US: 1,000	KMCA: Platinum
The Renaissance	Released: March 16, 2021 (KOR); Label: SM Entertainment; Formats: CD, digital download, streaming	1	—N/a	24	29	18	—	—	KOR: 442,742; JPN: 10,694	KMCA: Platinum
The Road	Released: January 6, 2023; Label: SM Entertainment, Label SJ; Format: CD, SMini, digital download, streaming	9	—N/a	42	—	43	—	—	KOR: 88,376; JPN: 1,174	
Super Junior25	Released: July 8, 2025; Label: SM Entertainment; Formats: SMini, digital download, streaming	2	—N/a	7	11	—	—	—	KOR: 388,516; JPN: 6,784	KMCA: Platinum
"—" denotes releases that did not chart or were not released in that territory.

=== Reissue albums ===
Title	Album details	Peak chart positions				Sales
Title	Album details	KOR	JPN	JPN Hot	US World	Sales
Don't Don (repackage)	Released: November 5, 2007 (KOR); Label: SM Entertainment; Formats: CD, digital download, streaming	16	—	—	—	
Sorry, Sorry (repackage)	Released: May 14, 2009 (KOR); Label: SM Entertainment; Formats: CD, digital download, streaming	26	—	—	—	
Bonamana (repackage)	Released: June 28, 2010 (KOR); Label: SM Entertainment; Formats: CD, digital download, streaming	1	—	—	—	KOR: 111,940
A-Cha	Released: September 19, 2011 (KOR); Label: SM Entertainment; Formats: CD, digital download, streaming	1	27	—	—	KOR: 180,336
Spy	Released: August 6, 2012 (KOR); Label: SM Entertainment; Formats: CD, digital download, streaming	1	10	—	—	KOR: 137,849
This Is Love	Released: October 27, 2014 (KOR); Label: SM Entertainment; Formats: CD, digital download, streaming	1	—	—	—	KOR: 151,935
Magic	Released: September 16, 2015 (KOR); Label: SM Entertainment; Formats: CD, digital download, streaming	1	—	43	—	KOR: 95,202
Replay	Released: April 12, 2018 (KOR); Label: SM Entertainment; Formats: CD, digital download, streaming	3	—	32	2	KOR: 114,457
Timeless	Released: January 28, 2020 (KOR); Label: SM Entertainment; Formats: CD, digital download, streaming	1	— (Note: Did not enter the Oricon Album Charts but peak at number 6 on Oricon Digital Albums Chart)	17	—	KOR: 121,293

=== Compilation albums ===
List of compilation albums, with selected details, featuring members, chart positions, sales and certifications
Title	Album details	Peak chart positions				Sales
Title	Album details	KOR	JPN	JPN Comb.	JPN Hot	Sales
Star	Released: January 27, 2021 (JPN); Label: Avex Trax; Formats: CD, digital download, streaming	—	5	5	5	JPN: 22,343

=== Single albums ===
List of single albums, with selected details, chart positions and sales
Title	Details	Peak chart positions		Sales
Title	Details	KOR Gaon	KOR RIAK	Sales
U	Released: June 3, 2006; Label: SM Entertainment; Format: CD	78 (Note: Released in 2006, the album entered the Gaon Album Chart in 2010 and peaked at number 78 for the week of August 15–21, 2010)	1	KOR: 83,010
The Road: Winter for Spring	Released: February 28, 2022; Label: SM Entertainment; Formats: CD, digital download, streaming	1		KOR: 190,869; JPN: 6,910
"—" denotes releases that did not chart or were not released in that territory.

=== Live albums ===
List of live albums, with selected details, chart positions and sales
Title	Album details	Peak chart positions			Sales
Title	Album details	KOR Gaon	KOR RIAK	JPN	Sales
Super Show - Super Junior The 1st Asia Tour Concert Album	Released: May 19, 2008; Label: SM Entertainment; Formats: CD	13 (Note: Released in 2008, Super Show - Super Junior The 1st Asia Tour Concert Album re-entered Gaon Music Chart in 2010 and peaked at no 13 on week July 4 to 10, 2010)	4	230	KOR: 20,862
Super Show 2 - Super Junior The 2nd Asia Tour Concert Album	Released: December 10, 2009; Label: SM Entertainment; Formats: CD	—		81	KOR: 25,954
Super Show 3 - Super Junior The 3rd Asia Tour Concert Album	Released: October 24, 2011; Label: SM Entertainment; Formats: CD	2		—	KOR: 30,951
Super Junior World Tour Super Show 4	Released: June 28, 2013; Label: SM Entertainment; Formats: CD	2		—	KOR: 20,263
Super Junior World Tour Super Show 5 Super Junior World Tour Super Show 6	Released: November 6, 2015; Label: SM Entertainment; Formats: CD, digital download, streaming	6		—	KOR: 38,475
"—" denotes releases that did not chart or were not released in that territory.

== Extended plays ==
List of extended plays, with selected chart positions and sales
Title	EP details	Peak chart positions				Sales
Title	EP details	KOR	JPN	JPN Comb.	JPN Hot	Sales
Super Junior Japan Limited Special Edition–Super Show 3 Kaisai Kinen Ban	Released: February 16, 2011(JPN); Label: Avex Trax; Formats: CD, CD+DVD	—	6	—	—	
One More Time	Released: October 8, 2018 (KOR); Label: SM Entertainment; Formats: CD, digital download	2	36	—	30	KOR: 142,534; JPN: 7,957
I Think U	Released: January 29, 2020 (JPN); Label: Avex Trax; Formats: CD, DVD, digital download, Blu-ray	—	2	2	2	JPN: 51,607
The Road: Keep On Going	Released: July 12, 2022 (KOR); Label: SM Entertainment; Formats: CD, digital download, streaming	3	8	9	7	KOR: 178,561; JPN: 14,445
The Road: Celebration	Released: December 16, 2022 (KOR); Label: SM Entertainment; Formats: CD, digital download	1	10	12	7	KOR: 188,304; JPN: 15,202

== Singles ==
=== Korean singles ===
List of Super Junior singles released in Korean
Title	Year	Peak chart positions					Sales	Album
Title	Year	KOR	KOR Hot	JPN Hot	TWN	US World	Sales	Album
"Twins (Knock Out)"	2005	—	—	—	—	—		Super Junior 05
"Miracle"	2006	—	—	—	—	—		Super Junior 05
"U"	2006	—	—	—	—	—	KOR: 1,700,000; KOR: 83,010 (phy.)	U
"Dancing Out"	2006	—	—	—	—	—		2006 Summer SMTown
"Full of Happiness" (행복)	2007	—	—	—	—	—		2007 Summer SMTown – Fragile
"Don't Don" (돈 돈!)	2007	—	—	—	—	—		Don't Don
"Marry U"	2007	—	—	—	—	—		Don't Don
"Sorry, Sorry" (쏘리 쏘리)	2009	—	—	—	—	9	KOR: 3,000,000	Sorry, Sorry
"It's You" (너라고)	2009	—	—	—	—	—	KOR: 1,225,000	Sorry, Sorry
"Bonamana" (미인아)	2010	8	—	—	—	18	KOR: 1,264,311	Bonamana
"No Other" (너 같은 사람 또 없어)	2010	20	—	—	—	5		Bonamana
"Knock Knock Knock" (똑똑똑)	2010	85	—	—	—	—		Non album-single
"Mr. Simple"	2011	4	5	—	—	—	KOR: 1,900,000; US: 48,000	Mr. Simple
"A-Cha"	2011	15	19	—	—	2	KOR: 710,531	Mr. Simple
"Santa U Are the One"	2011	64	—	—	—	—	KOR: 260,238	2011 Winter SMTown – The Warmest Gift
"Sexy, Free & Single"	2012	5	15	—	—	4	KOR: 872,657	Sexy, Free & Single
"Spy"	2012	10	20	—	—	5	KOR: 440,202	Sexy, Free & Single
"Mamacita" (아야야)	2014	11	—	—	—	4	KOR: 159,986	Mamacita
"This Is Love" (Stage version)	2014	62	—	—	—	8	KOR: 19,182	Mamacita
"Evansece" (백일몽)	2014	144	—	—	—	17		Mamacita
"Devil"	2015	21	—	—	—	6	KOR: 153,660	Devil
"Magic"	2015	87	—	—	—	13	KOR: 25,405	Devil
"One More Chance" (비처럼 가지 마요)	2017	85	—	—	—	—	KOR: 20,443	Play
"Black Suit"	2017	23	—	81	—	8	KOR: 92,923	Play
"Lo Siento" (featuring Leslie Grace)	2018	— (Note: Did not enter Gaon Digital chart but peaked at number 77 on Gaon Mobile ringtones chart)	—	—	—	2 (Note: Also charted on Latin Digital song sales and peaked at number 13)	US: 2,000	Replay
"Super Duper"	2018	—	—	—	—	—		Replay
"Animals"	2018	— (Note: Did not enter Gaon Digital Chart but peaked at number 83 on Gaon BGM chart, and at number 86 on Gaon Mobile ringback tones chart)	—	—	—	—		One More Time
"One More Time (Otra Vez)" (featuring Reik)	2018	—	28	15	—	4 (Note: Also charted on Latin Digital Song Sales and peaked at number 18)	US: 1,000	One More Time
"Show"	2019	—	—	—	—	—		Time Slip
"Somebody New"	2019	—	—	—	—	—		Time Slip
"The Crown"	2019	—	—	—	—	—		Time Slip
"I Think I"	2019	—	—	—	—	19		Time Slip
"Super Clap"	2019	83	—	—	—	20		Time Slip
"2YA2YAO!"	2020	188	93	—	—	14		Timeless
"The Melody" (우리에게)	2020	— (Note: Did not enter Gaon Digital Chart but peaked at number 155 on Gaon Download Chart)	—	—	—	—		The Renaissance
"House Party"	2021	107	99	—	—	21		The Renaissance
"Callin'"	2022	— (Note: Did not enter Gaon Digital Chart but peaked at number 10 on Gaon Download Chart)	—	—	—	—		The Road: Winter for Spring
"Mango"	2022	123	(Note: Chart was discontinued in 2022)	—	—	—		The Road: Keep On Going
"Celebrate"	2022	— (Note: Did not enter Circle Digital Chart but peaked at number 13 on Circle Download Chart)	(Note: Chart was discontinued in 2022)	—	—	—		The Road: Celebration
"Show Time"	2024	— (Note: Did not enter Circle Digital Chart but peaked at number 24 on Circle Download Chart)	(Note: Chart was discontinued in 2022)	—	—	—		Non-album single
"Express Mode"	2025	61	(Note: Chart was discontinued in 2022)	—	25	—		Super Junior 25
"—" denotes releases that did not chart or were not released in that region.

=== Japanese singles ===
List of Super Junior singles released in Japanese
Title	Year	Peak chart positions			Sales	Certifications	Album
Title	Year	JPN	JPN Hot	JPN RIAJ (Note: Sales figures for Chaku-Uta full (cellphone downloads), Chaku-Uta (ringtones) and regular digital downloads were compiled by the RIAJ Digital Track Chart until July 27, 2012.)	Sales	Certifications	Album
"U" / "Twins"	2008	8	—	—	JPN: 20,375		Non-album single
"Marry U"	2008	20	—	—	JPN: 8,705		Non-album single
"Bijin (Bonamana)" (美人)	2011	2	8	45	JPN: 59,262		Hero
"Mr. Simple"	2011	2	12	32	JPN: 110,608	RIAJ: Gold (physical)	Hero
"Opera"	2012	3	3	15	JPN: 184,469	RIAJ: Gold (physical)	Hero
"Sexy, Free & Single"	2012	2	3	—	JPN: 123,140	RIAJ: Gold (physical)	Hero
"Blue World"	2013	3	6	(Note: Chart was discontinued in 2012)	JPN: 77,026		Star
"Mamacita: Ayaya"	2014	1	20	(Note: Chart was discontinued in 2012)	JPN: 69,498		Star
"Devil" / "Magic"	2016	2	5	(Note: Chart was discontinued in 2012)	JPN: 65,819		Star
"On and On"	2017	—	36	(Note: Chart was discontinued in 2012)			Star
"One More Time"	2018	3	15	(Note: Chart was discontinued in 2012)	JPN: 48,758		Star
"I Think I"	2019	—	— (Note: Did not enter Billboard Japan Hot 100 but peaked at number 95 on Download Songs)	(Note: Chart was discontinued in 2012)			I Think U
"—" denotes releases that did not chart or were not released in that region. "*" denotes chart did not exist at that time.

=== Collaborations ===
Title	Year	Peak chart positions	Sales and certifications	Album
Title	Year	KOR	Sales and certifications	Album
"Show Me Your Love" (with TVXQ)	2005	28 (Note: Released in 2005, "Show Me Your Love" peaked at number one on the MIAK charts for the month of December 2005. It entered the Gaon Album Chart in 2010 and peaked at number 28 for the week of February 21–27, 2010.)	KOR (CD): 67,000	Non-album single
"Red Sun" (as SM Town)	2006	—		2006 Summer SMTown
"Snow Dream" (as SM Town)	2006	—		2006 Winter SMTown – Snow Dream
"Let's Go On a Trip" (as SM Town)	2007	—		2007 Summer SMTown – Fragile
"Only Love" (as SM Town)	2007	—		2007 Winter SMTown – Only Love
"Light" (빛) (with various artist (Note: with Big Mama, Crown J, JK Kim Dong-wook, Kim Jang-hoon, Kim Jong-seo, No Brain, Defconn, Girls' Generation, Yang Hee-eun, Lim Jeong-hee and Choi Bool-am))	2007	—		Non-album single
"Seoul" (with Girls' Generation)	2009	—		Non-album single
"Dear My Family" (as SM Town)	2012	—		Non-album single
"Dear My Family" (Live concert ver.) (as SM Town)	2017	—		SM Station
"Bit (Hope from Kwangya)" (as SM Town)	2021	— (Note: Did not enter Circle Digital Chart but peaked at number 41 on Circle Download Chart)		2021 Winter SM Town: SMCU Express

=== Soundtrack appearances ===
Title	Year	Peak chart positions	Album
Title	Year	KOR	Album
"Success"	2007	—	H.I.T OST
"H.I.T" (히트)	2007	—	H.I.T OST
"Wonder Boy"	2007	—	Attack on the Pin-Up Boys OST
"Our Love" (우리들의 사랑; drama version)	2007	—	Thirty Thousand Miles In Search of My Son OST
"Victory Korea"	2010	—	Dreams Come True OST
"Angel"	2010	99	Haru OST
"Bite the Lips" (입술을 깨물고)	2010	60	The President OST
"Come a Little Closer" (너와 나)	2019	—	Analog Trip OST
"—" denotes releases that did not chart or were not released in that region.

== Other charted songs ==
List of songs, with selected chart positions, sales and certifications, showing year released and album name
Title	Year	Peak chart positions		Sales	Album
Title	Year	KOR	US World	Sales	Album
"Boom Boom" (나쁜 여자)	2010	88	—		Bonamana
"Opera" (오페라)	2011	88	17		Mr. Simple
"Be My Girl" (라라라라)	2011	99	—		Mr. Simple
"A Day" (하루에)	2011	—	22		A-Cha
"Andante" (안단테)	2011	—	19		A-Cha
"Oops!" (featuring f(x))	2011	88	10		A-Cha
"From U" (너로부터)	2012	51	23	KOR: 141,293	Sexy, Free & Single
"Now"	2012	72	—	KOR: 78,309	Sexy, Free & Single
"Rockstar"	2012	77	—	KOR: 70,874	Sexy, Free & Single
"Gulliver" (걸리버)	2012	82	—	KOR: 62,727	Sexy, Free & Single
"Someday" (언젠가는)	2012	68	—	KOR: 84,424	Sexy, Free & Single
"Bittersweet" (달콤씁쓸)	2012	65	—	KOR: 86,267	Sexy, Free & Single
"Butterfly" (빠삐용)	2012	83	—	KOR: 63,141	Sexy, Free & Single
"Daydream" (머문다)	2012	76	—	KOR: 72,303	Sexy, Free & Single
"A 'Good'bye" (헤어지는 날)	2012	71	—	KOR: 82,293	Sexy, Free & Single
"Only U"	2012	86	15	KOR: 34,998	Spy
"Outsider"	2012	102	18	KOR: 31,412	Spy
"Haru" (하루)	2012	93	14	KOR: 31,412	Spy
"Midnight Blues" (춤을 춘다)	2014	151	—	KOR: 11,443	Mamacita
"Raining Spell for Love" (사랑이 멎지 않게)	2014	142	—	KOR: 17,128	Mamacita
"Shirt"	2014	132	—	KOR: 24,307	Mamacita
"Let's Dance"	2014	168	—	KOR: 10,671	Mamacita
"Too Many Beautiful Girls"	2014	164	—	KOR: 10,888	Mamacita
"Mid-Season" (환절기)	2014	147	—	KOR: 16,278	Mamacita
"Islands"	2014	152	—	KOR: 11,585	Mamacita
"Hit Me Up"	2014	291	—	KOR: 4,515	This is Love
"Don't Leave Me"	2014	279	—	KOR: 14,643	This is Love
"...Ing" (중)	2014	263	—	KOR: 5,084	This is Love
"Simply Beautiful"	2015	154	—	KOR: 18,947	Devil
"Stars Appear..." (별이 뜬다)	2015	143	—	KOR: 20,437	Devil
"Good Love"	2015	177	—	KOR: 16,733	Devil
"We Can"	2015	153	—	KOR: 18,612	Devil
"Don't Wake Me Up"	2015	161	—	KOR: 18,494	Devil
"Love at First Sight" (첫눈에 반했습니다)	2015	148	—	KOR: 20,499	Devil
"Forever with You" (每天)	2015	193	—	KOR: 11,252	Devil
"Rock'n Shine!"	2015	185	—	KOR: 12,331	Devil
"Alright"	2015	157	—	KOR: 22,938	Devil
"You Got It" (놈, 놈, 놈)	2015	308	—	KOR: 5,986	Magic
"Dorothy" (도로시)	2015	200	—	KOR: 9,228	Magic
"Sarang♥"	2015	298	—	KOR: 6,170	Magic
"Magical" (with TVXQ)	2021	— (Note: Did not chart in Gaon Digital Chart but chart at number 154 in the component Download Chart.)	—		2021 Winter SM Town: SMCU Express
"Burn the Floor"	2021	— (Note: Did not enter Circle Digital Chart but peaked at number 41 on Circle Download Chart)	—		The Renaissance
"Paradox"	2021	— (Note: Did not enter Circle Digital Chart but peaked at number 75 on Circle Download Chart)	—		The Renaissance
"Closer"	2021	— (Note: Did not enter Circle Digital Chart but peaked at number 71 on Circle Download Chart)	—		The Renaissance
"Raining Spell for Love" (사랑이 멎지 않게; remake version)	2021	— (Note: Did not enter Circle Digital Chart but peaked at number 63 on Circle Download Chart)	—		The Renaissance
"Mystery"	2021	— (Note: Did not enter Circle Digital Chart but peaked at number 77 on Circle Download Chart)	—		The Renaissance
"More Days with You" (같이 걸을까)	2021	— (Note: Did not enter Circle Digital Chart but peaked at number 57 on Circle Download Chart)	—		The Renaissance
"Tell Me Baby" (하얀 거짓말)	2021	— (Note: Did not enter Circle Digital Chart but peaked at number 73 on Circle Download Chart)	—		The Renaissance
"Super"	2021	— (Note: Did not enter Circle Digital Chart but peaked at number 78 on Circle Download Chart)	—		The Renaissance
"Analogue Radio"	2022	— (Note: Did not enter Circle Digital Chart but peaked at number 108 on Circle Download Chart)	—		The Road: Winter for Spring
"Don't Wait"	2022	— (Note: Did not enter Circle Digital Chart but peaked at number 114 on Circle Download Chart)	—		The Road: Keep On Going
"My Wish"	2022	— (Note: Did not enter Circle Digital Chart but peaked at number 141 on Circle Download Chart)	—		The Road: Keep On Going
"Everyday"	2022	— (Note: Did not enter Circle Digital Chart but peaked at number 132 on Circle Download Chart)	—		The Road: Keep On Going
"Always"	2022	— (Note: Did not enter Circle Digital Chart but peaked at number 136 on Circle Download Chart)	—		The Road: Keep On Going
"Hate Christmas"	2022	— (Note: Did not enter Circle Digital Chart but peaked at number 140 on Circle Download Chart)	—		The Road: Celebration
"Snowman"	2022	— (Note: Did not enter Circle Digital Chart but peaked at number 144 on Circle Download Chart)	—		The Road: Celebration
"White Love" (스키장에서)	2022	— (Note: Did not enter Circle Digital Chart but peaked at number 107 on Circle Download Chart)	—		The Road: Celebration
"If Only You" (너였으면 참 좋겠다...)	2022	— (Note: Did not enter Circle Digital Chart but peaked at number 129 on Circle Download Chart)	—		The Road: Celebration
"I Pray 4 U"	2025	— (Note: "I Pray 4 U" did not enter the Circle Digital Chart; it peaked at number 123 on the component Download Chart.)	—		2025 SM Town: The Culture, the Future
"—" denotes releases that did not chart or were not released in that region.

== Other appearances ==
List of non-single guest appearances, showing year released and album name
Title	Year	Album
"Smile!"	2006	2006 Summer SMTown
"Tic! Toc!"	2006	2006 Winter SMTown - Snow Dream
"Chonnuni Wa (First Snow)"	2007	2007 Winter SMTown - Only Love
"Soneul Jabayo (Holding Your Hand)"	2008	2008 SBS Hope TV24
"Seaside Hyugeso (Boom Boom)"	2009	2009 Summer SMTown - We Are Shining
"Carnival"	2009	2009 Summer SMTown - We Are Shining

== See also ==
- List of songs recorded by Super Junior
- Solo
  - Yesung discography
  - Kim Ryeowook discography
  - Cho Kyu-hyun discography
- Subgroups
  - Super Junior-K.R.Y.#Discography
  - Super Junior-T#Discography
  - Super Junior-M#Discography
  - Super Junior-H#Discography
  - Super Junior-D&E discography
  - Super Junior-L.S.S.#Discography
