= Super Show 10 =

2025–2026 concert tour by Super Junior

- World tour by Super Junior
- Official poster
- Location: Asia; Latin America
- Associated albums: Super Junior25
- Start date: August 22, 2025
- End date: April 5, 2026
- No. of shows: 33

Super Junior concert chronology
- Super Show Spin-Off: Halftime (2024); Super Show 10 (2025–2026)

Super Show 10 is a 20th anniversary tour by the South Korean boy band Super Junior, which started at KSPO Dome, South Korea on August 22, 2025, and ended on April 5, 2026, at the same venue. The final three concerts were promoted as the tour's encore and titled Super Show 10: SJ-Core. The concert tour featured songs from the boy band's latest album Super Junior25, as well as older songs from their music catalogue.

== Background ==
Super Junior debuted in November 2005 with the album Super Junior 05. In June 2024, they released the stand-alone single Show Time, signalling the start of activities leading up to the boy band's upcoming 20th anniversary. Shortly after, they embarked on a short Asian tour, the Super Show Spin-Off: Halftime which served as a build-up to the anniversary. On the final show of the tour in Jakarta, they revealed a new album and its tied-up tour is in the plan. In the closing VCR, they also teased that Heechul will be returning to the boy band's line-up on the upcoming tour. He had missed three of the band's previous tours, the Super Show 8: Infinite Time (2019), Super Show 9: Road (2022–2023), and Super Show Spin-Off: Halftime, due to difficulties in performing their choreographies as he continued to experience chronic leg pain after a 2006 car accident that rendered him disable.

In an episode of Im Won-hee's Gourmet Show aired in March 2025, Leeteuk revealed that the boy band is in the process of producing a new album. A news outlet then reported that the album would be released in early July. SM Entertainment, the band's label officially confirmed the album's release date to be on July 8 and revealed its title as Super Junior25, a homage to their debut album's title. "Express Mode", an uptempo club-pop song served as the album's title track. The agency also announced on June 12, 2025, that Super Junior will launch a world tour, the Super Show 10 to celebrate their 20th debut anniversary, as well as revealing concert dates for 16 cities. The tour started at KSPO Dome, Seoul in August 2025 and is projected to end in March 2026. In January 2026, Super Junior through their agency announced a 3-days encore concert entitled Super Show 10: SJ-Core to be held at KSPO Dome on April 3 to April 5, 2026, to top off the tour and conclude their 20th anniversary activities.

== Overview and production ==
Super Show 10 is the tenth edition of the boy band's tour series Super Show, which was first held in 2008. It featured nine members of Super Junior; Leeteuk, Heechul, Yesung, Shindong, Eunhyuk, Donghae, Siwon, Ryeowook, and Kyuhyun. It is the boy band's first concert tour in seven years to feature Heechul in the line-up. He last performed at the band's tour in March 2019 for Super Show 7. In the week leading up the tour, Super Junior launched a streaming event called Super Week, where they live streamed the band's previous tours on their YouTube channel. They released a promotional brand film for the tour on August 19, which was released in a public service announcement format. It portrayed the band members from different companies, SM, ODE, and Antenna reunited as Super Junior for the tour.

The elder five band members participated in the tour's production, with each member focusing on different aspects of the show. Eunhyuk, who had directed the band's previous tours Super Show 7 and Super Show 8: Infinite Time, devised the tour's setlist and performances. Shindong, who himself is a music video director and owns a production company, directed the VCR used in the concert. Leeteuk, the band leader who is also a television host, planned the audience interaction segment in the concert. Heechul was in charged of playing instrument, while Yesung gave styling ideas. The stage set featured an extended stage shaped as the letter X, a reference to the Roman numeral X which equalises to number 10. In Seoul stops, it also featured a 5 metres-high X-shaped Kinesis lighting system that doubled as an aerial stage.

Super Show 10 is held in celebration of Super Junior's 20th debut anniversary, and their will to share the milestone with their fan club, the ELF, which is an acronym for Ever Lasting Friends. Leeteuk said the tour's theme to be "a time to encompass the past, present, and future". The setlist crafted for the tour is described as a reinterpretation of Super Junior's discography spanning 20 years, including songs from their sub-units. Seven out of nine songs from their most recent album Super Junior25 (2025) is included in the setlist, as well as title tracks from their back catalogue. Super Junior reached a new career milestone during the tour by performing the band's 200th headlining concert on September 13, 2025, at the Jakarta stop.

== Ticket sales ==
Ticket sales for Super Show 10 are handled by various ticketing agencies around the world. As of January 2026, tickets were reportedly sold out across all dates. In South Korea, the tickets for the opening two-days concert in Seoul were sold on the platform Melon Tickets with prices ranging from ₩154,000 to ₩198,000. The ticketing were scheduled to be held on two days, on June 23 for fan club presales and on June 25 for general sales. However, the tickets were sold out after the presales alone, thus an additional day was added to the stop. These tickets were also sold out, including the restricted seats. Tickets for the Hong Kong two-days concert were sold via local ticketing platforms Fantopia and Beijing-based Damai.cn. The presale tickets that went on sale at noon on July 22 were sold out after 5 minutes. The tickets that went on general sales the next day also immediately sold out.

In Indonesia, iMe Indonesia who served as the tour promotion partner in that region announced that the tickets are priced from Rp 1.9 million to Rp 3.8 million, which sold out after they went on sale. In the Philippines, the ticket sales was handled by local promoter Pulp Live World. On September 10, 2025, they announced that the ticket for the upcoming show in Manila were sold out. In Taiwan, 80,000 customers virtually queued for the two days Taipei Dome concert tickets, which were sold out within 1 minute. In response, Super Junior announced an additional date for the stop, as well as its ticketing dates, September 20 for fan club members presales and September 21 for general sale. After the tickets were sold out, a third sale for additional seats, including those with restricted views was held on October 3, 2025.

OCESA was in charged of the concert promotion in both Mexico City and Monterrey, Mexico. After announcing the ticket sales dates without declaring its prices, tax fees and seating maps, the promoter was reported to the consumer protection agency PROFECO. OCESA subsequently revealed the ticket prices on July 3, ahead of the presales event. Fan presales were held on July 5, Citibanamex presales on July 10, and general sales on July 11, 2025, all through Ticketmaster platform. The prices for general tickets in both venues were priced up to N$3,300, while a VIP package which includes access to soundcheck was priced N$7,972.

Following the announcement of an additional three days encore concert in Seoul, tickets went on sale on the platform Melon Tickets in January 2026, and were immediately sold out.

== Concert summary ==
Super Junior appeared from an aerial structure, dressed in all-white suits embellished with rhinestones. They descended to the main stage before emerging amidst lasers and lights to perform their debut single "Twins (Knock Out)" (released in 2005) with eight members. Kyuhyun then entered the stage, joining the performance of "U" (2006), signifying his debut with Super Junior a year later. They performed "It's You", "Black Suit" and "Mamacita" back to back, followed by a VCR introducing the band members and their past activities. From Hong Kong stops onwards, "It's You" was dropped from the setlist.

They reappeared in black outfits and sitting on thrones before performing "Superman" against a backdrop of a fluttering red flag, followed by Korean version of "Super Girl", "Haircut", and "Say Less" before finally introducing themselves to the audience. The band made their signature greetings, shouting "We are Super Junior". After the segment, they perform either "Delight" or "Walkin'", followed by another VCR. A fan-centered video, it portrayed the story of a fan who recalled the times when she became a fan of the band, and her experiences in supporting and cheering for them for 20 years, delivering the message that Super Junior's 20th anniversary is also the fan's 20th.

Then they changed to casual outfits to perform slow-tempo and lyrical numbers. During the performances in Seoul, the band members were lifted into the air using the X-shaped aerial stage to get closer to the audiences in the second and third floor during the performance of "I Know" and "Our Love". Then, they came down to the audiences and performed "No Other" and "From U" in close settings, while also exchanging high-fives, handshakes and hugs with the fans. They return to the stage to perform "In My Dream" and "Dorothy" accompanied by LED backdrops showing an image of a large tree.

Next, they changed into animal-themed pajamas, and performed "Miracle", as well as songs from their sub-units, namely "Pajama Party" from Super Junior-Happy, "Me" from Super Junior-M, and "Rokkugo" from Super Junior-T. During the Latin American leg of the tour, this segment was scrapped and replaced with performances of their Latin-pop releases namely "One More Time (Otra Vez)", "Lo Siento", and "Ahora Te Puedes Marchar". These segments are followed by an intermission in which a massive intense laser show with EDM beats in the background were played. In the next segment, they performed a medley of "D.N.A", "Rockstar", and "A-Cha", which were also rearranged in EDM versions, against a backdrop of dazzling light effects. "A-Cha" was performed multiple times with Ryeowook belting its high notes over and over again.

In the next segment, they performed a catalogue of their title tracks with new arrangement that emphasises on beats, starting with their latest single "Express Mode". This is followed by performances of "Mr. Simple" and "Bonamana". Heechul then played the drums to the intro of "Sorry, Sorry", accompanied by Yesung's vocal before the boy band performed it together. They finished off the segment with "Don't Don".

They returned to the stage for the encore, opening with "Marry U", followed by "Haengbok", while walking across every corner of the stage to wave and interact with the audience. The members then delivered their closing remarks before performing "Finale". Beginning with the Seoul performances, the group concluded the show with a second encore of "Miracle". During the 2026 leg of the tour, "Don't Don" and "Stuck With You" were removed from the regular setlist, while "Miracle" became a permanent part of the encore. The encore concerts featured a substantially redesigned setlist, opening with "Burn the Floor", "Say Less", "It's You", and "Opera", followed by performances of "A Man in Love", "U", "Mr. Simple", "Mamacita", and "Devil". The concert also incorporated a ballad section featuring "Mirror", "Daydream", "Raining Spell for Love", "Storm", "Evanesce", "Mid-season", and "Angela", alongside special stages by Super Junior-L.S.S., Super Junior-K.R.Y., and Super Junior-D&E. The encore concerts concluded with "Shining Star", "Wonder Boy", "Miracle", and "Too Many Beautiful Girls". The duration of each concert was approximately three hours.

== Live broadcast ==
The opening concert on August 22, 2025, was broadcast live to selected cinemas across the world. The shows held on August 23 and 24 were live streamed through Weverse and Beyond Live. In Japan, the August 24 concert was also aired live on KNTV channel. The concert held at Belluna Dome, Saitama on March 8, 2026, was broadcast live on Fuji Television Two.

The encore concerts held in Seoul from April 4, 2026, were broadcast live on selected cinemas around the world, with Lotte Cinema acting as the broadcasting partner in South Korea. The concerts on April 4 and 5, 2026, also aired on pay-per-view platforms Weverse and Beyond Live.

== Setlist ==
South Korea (Kickoff)

Opening

- Twins (Knock Out) (without Kyuhyun)
- U (with Kyuhyun)
- It's You
- Black Suit (Super Show 7 Version)
- Mamacita (Super Show 7 Version)

Act 2

- Superman
- Super Girl (Korean Version)
- Haircut
- Say Less

Act 3

- Delight
- I Know
- Our Love
- No Other
- From U
- In My Dream
- Dorothy

Act 4

- Miracle
- Pajama Party
- Me (Korean Version)
- Rokkugo

Act 5

- DJ Remix Segment (Super Duper / Super Clap / Shake It Up!)
- D.N.A
- Rockstar
- A-Cha

Act 6

- Express Mode
- Mr. Simple
- Bonamana (Super Show 3 and Super Show 8 Version)
- Sorry, Sorry (Super Show 9 Version ft. Heechul and Yesung Pre-Performance)
- Don't Don

Encore

- Stuck With You
- Marry U
- Haengbok
- Finale
- Miracle (Day 3 only)
2025 Tour Stops

Opening

- Twins (Knock Out) (without Kyuhyun)
- U (with Kyuhyun)
- Black Suit (Super Show 7 Version)
- Mamacita (Super Show 7 Version)

Act 2

- Superman
- Super Girl (Korean Version)
- Haircut
- Say Less

Act 3

- Delight
- I Know
- Our Love
- No Other
- From U
- In My Dream
- Dorothy

Act 4

- Miracle
- Pajama Party
- Me (Korean Version)
- Rokkugo

Act 5

- D.N.A
- Rockstar
- A-Cha

Act 6

- Express Mode
- Mr. Simple (Half except October Stops except Manila)
- Bonamana (Super Show 3 and Super Show 8 Version) (Full except October stops except Manila)
- Sorry, Sorry (Super Show 9 Version ft. Heechul and Yesung Pre-Performance)
- Don't Don (Until Taiwan stop only)

Encore

- Marry U
- Haengbok
- Finale
- Miracle (Not all countries)
Latin America

Opening

- Twins (Knock Out)
- U
- Black Suit
- Mamacita

Act 2

- SUPERMAN
- Super Girl (SUPER JUNIOR-M cover) (Korean Version)
- Haircut
- Say Less

Act 3

- I Know
- Dorothy
- No Other
- From U
- One More Time (Otra Vez)

Act 4

- Lo Siento
- Ahora te puedes marchar (Luis Miguel cover)
- Language Adaptation of I Only Want to Be With You

Act 5

- D.N.A.
- Rockstar
- A-Cha

Act 6

- Express Mode
- Mr. Simple (Full)
- Bonamana (Half)
- Sorry, Sorry (No Drums)
- Don't Don

Encore

- Marry U
- Ai se eu te pego (Michel Teló cover)
- Miracle
2026 Tour Stops

Opening

- Twins (Knock Out)
- U
- Black Suit
- Mamacita

Act 2

- SUPERMAN
- Super Girl (SUPER JUNIOR-M cover) (Korean Version)
- Haircut
- Say Less

Act 3

- I Know
- Way
- No Other
- From U
- In My Dream
- Dorothy

Act 4

- Rokkugo (SUPER JUNIOR-T cover)
- Wow! Wow!! Wow!!!

Act 5

- D.N.A.
- Rockstar
- A-Cha

Act 6

- Express Mode
- Mr. Simple
- Bonamana
- Sorry, Sorry

Encore

- Marry U
- ★BAMBINA★
- Finale
- Miracle (band ver.)
Encore

Act 1

- Burn the Floor
- Say Less
- It's You (Super Show 9 Version - Shortened - With Heechul in 2nd Half)
- Opera

Act 2

- A Man in Love (Remix Ver).
- U
- Mr. Simple
- Mamacita (Super Show 7 Version)
- Devil

Act 3

- Mirror
- Daydream
- Raining Spell for Love
- Storm
- Evanesce
- Mid-season
- Angela

Act 4

- Joke (Super Junior-L.S.S.) (Unreleased)
- In the Middle of (...ing) (Super Junior-K.R.Y.) (Unreleased)
- ONSAEMIRO (Super Junior-83z - Leeteuk and Heechul) (Unreleased)
- Rocket (Super Junior-D&E) (Unreleased)

Act 5

- D.N.A
- Rockstar
- A-Cha
- Let's Dance

VCR SING-ALONG

- Twins (Super Show 1-4, 6, 10)
- Don't Don (Super Show 1-4, 7s, 10)

Act 6

- Express Mode
- Black Suit
- Bonamana (Super Show 3 and Super Show 8 Version)
- Sorry, Sorry (Super Show 9 Version ft. Heechul and Yesung Pre-Performance)

Encore

- Shining Star
- Wonder Boy
- Miracle
- Too Many Beautiful Girls

== Notes ==
1. Mr. Simple or Bonamana was performed in shortened versions beginning after the Seoul stops.
2. Heechul did not perform the drum segment during the Manila, Mexico, Peru, and Vietnam stops.

== Tour dates ==
2025 concert dates
Date (2025)	City	Country	Venue	Attendance	Ref
August 22	Seoul	South Korea	KSPO Dome	29,619	
August 23	Seoul	South Korea	KSPO Dome	29,619	
August 24	Seoul	South Korea	KSPO Dome	29,619	
September 5	Hong Kong	China	AsiaWorld-Arena	—	
September 6	Hong Kong	China	AsiaWorld-Arena	—	
September 13	Jakarta	Indonesia	Indonesia Convention Exhibition	—	
October 4	Manila	Philippines	SM Mall of Asia Arena	—	
October 12	Mexico City	Mexico	Palacio de los Deportes	15,400	
October 14	Monterrey	Mexico	Auditorio Banamex	—	
October 16	Lima	Peru	Estadio San Marcos	—	
October 18	Santiago	Chile	Movistar Arena	—	
November 14	Taipei	Taiwan	Taipei Dome	90,000	
November 15	Taipei	Taiwan	Taipei Dome	90,000	
November 16	Taipei	Taiwan	Taipei Dome	90,000	
November 29	Bangkok	Thailand	Impact Arena	22,000	
November 30	Bangkok	Thailand	Impact Arena	22,000	
December 13	Nagoya	Japan	Aichi Sky Expo	—	
December 14	Nagoya	Japan	Aichi Sky Expo	—	

2026 concert dates
Date (2026)	City	Country	Venue	Attendance	Ref
January 2	—N/a	Singapore	Singapore Indoor Stadium	—	
January 3	—N/a	Singapore	Singapore Indoor Stadium	—	
January 9	Macau	China	Galaxy Arena	30,000	
January 10	Macau	China	Galaxy Arena	30,000	
January 11	Macau	China	Galaxy Arena	30,000	
January 17	Kuala Lumpur	Malaysia	Axiata Arena	—	
January 23	Kaohsiung	Taiwan	Kaohsiung Arena	50,000	
January 24	Kaohsiung	Taiwan	Kaohsiung Arena	50,000	
January 25	Kaohsiung	Taiwan	Kaohsiung Arena	50,000	
March 7	Saitama	Japan	Belluna Dome	—	
March 8	Saitama	Japan	Belluna Dome	—	
March 21	Ho Chi Minh City	Vietnam	Saigon Exhibition and Convention Center Outdoor	—	
April 3	Seoul	South Korea	KSPO Dome	—	
April 4	Seoul	South Korea	KSPO Dome	—	
April 5	Seoul	South Korea	KSPO Dome	—	
Total				—	—

== Critical reception ==
Journalist Cheon Yoon-hye of MTN News complimented Super Junior vocals, saying "the members clear tones which swayed between dance and ballad tracks blended harmoniously". She also commended the show's diverse performances, consisting "intense group dances to sexy choreographies, amplified the unique charm of Super Show". Sports Seoul journalist Ham Sang-beom admired the boy band's stage presence, saying it "remain the same despite being aging idols" and noted how they have similar passion compared to their rookie days. Writing for IDN Times, journalist Elizabeth Chiquita Tuedestin Priwiratu praised the concert's production quality in Jakarta stop, describing the usage of fireworks and confetti as "not stingy". She also said that Super Show 10 is not just a concert, but a "nostalgic and togetherness celebration" between fans and the band.

== Incidents ==
During the final show of the Seoul leg on August 24, 2025, member Kyuhyun sustained an ankle injury after twisting his ankle while descending from the stage during the latter part of the concert. According to SM Entertainment, he suffered a pulled muscle but chose to continue performing without choreography for the remainder of the show. Kyuhyun was absent from the stage until the "Express Mode" segment of the concert, after which he returned and remained seated for the rest of the performance while completing the show. He also remained seated throughout the Hong Kong stop of the tour as he continued his recovery.

During the second night of the Seoul encore concert on April 4, 2026, member Donghae tripped over a rising stage platform and fell heavily during the performance of "Let's Dance", briefly shocking both the members and backup dancers. This causes the team to discontinue their dance and ending with Donghae walking out alongside the rest of the members, preparing for the next act. He was able to return to the stage and continue performing, and no official statement regarding injuries was released by SM Entertainment.

During the final night of the encore concerts, Super Show 10: SJ-CORE, on April 5, 2026, three audience members were injured after safety fences installed beside the audience area collapsed. Ryeowook, who witnessed the incident from the stage, immediately alerted staff and Siwon before leaving the stage to seek assistance, according to footage and media reports. The injured attendees were transported to a hospital and were diagnosed with sprains and contusions requiring approximately two weeks of rest. Ryeowook and Siwon later accompanied the injured audience members to the hospital, where they remained to comfort the fans. SM Entertainment issued a formal apology, pledged to provide full support for the injured audience members, and announced that it would strengthen its safety measures and audience management protocols to prevent similar incidents in the future.
