= Super Show 9: Road =

2022–23 concert tour by Super Junior

- World tour by Super Junior
- Promotional poster for the tour
- Location: Asia; South America
- Associated albums: The Renaissance; The Road
- Start date: July 15, 2022
- End date: April 16, 2023
- No. of shows: 25

Super Junior concert chronology
- Beyond the Super Show (2020); Super Show 9: Road (2022–23); Super Show Spin-Off: Halftime (2024)

Super Show 9: Road was the sixth world concert tour and ninth tour overall by South Korean boy band Super Junior, in support of their eleventh studio album, The Road. The world tour commenced with three shows in Seoul from July 15–17, 2022. This tour marks the return of the group on world concert tour after three years due to the COVID-19 pandemic. On June 13, Label SJ announced that Heechul would not be joining the tour due to ongoing health issues.

== Background ==
On June 3, 2022, Super Junior announced their dates for the tour Super Show 9, before the promotion of their eleventh studio album, The Road : Keep on Going. The concert on July 17, 2022 was broadcast via Beyond LIVE. On March 16, 2023, Super Junior announced their encore concert in Seoul, titled "Super Show 9 : Road Show". The second show (April 16) will also be live-streamed via Beyond LIVE.

== Critical reception ==
Jan Lee, writing for The Straits Times highlighted their stage presence, saying they "showcased the top-notch polish and showmanship" of a K-pop act and "unlike newer groups who perhaps still feel the pressure to be perfect, Super Junior were so comfortable and at home, it was akin to a meeting with old friends." Georgie Joseph from Harian Metro, in his review of the Malaysian stop said that Super Junior were "well prepared" for the concert. He elaborated that "they are ready to bring a performance concept that is rarely seen" and "to show off their different side". He also praised the "broadway segment" in the concert, in which the band wore English nobility costume, saying it was "quite entertaining".

== Setlist ==
South Korea

Opening VCR

- Burn The Floor
- The Crown
- Super
- Mr. Simple (Super Show 5 Version)

VCR

- Ticky Tocky
- Paradox
- Mystery

MENT

- Mango

VCR

- Corazón Perdido (Lost Heart) (Yesung Solo)
- Blue Moon + California Love (Donghae Solo)
- To Me + Dreams Come True (Ryeowook Solo)
- Be (Eunhyuk Solo)
- I Can't (Super Junior-K.R.Y.)

MENT

- My Wish
- Callin'

VCR

- Spy (Opera Version)
- Rokkugo (Opera Version)
- Mamacita (Ayaya) (Opera Version)

MENT

- Latte (Leeteuk, Shindong, Siwon)
- House Party
- Everyday
- Wonder Boy
- Let's Dance

MENT

- Devil
- Don't Wait

VCR

- At Gwanghwamun (Rock Version) (Kyuhyun Solo)
- B.A.D. + Danger (Super Junior-D&E)
- Black Suit
- Sorry, Sorry
- Bonamana

Encore VCR (Analogue Radio)

- More Days With You
- Walkin'

MENT

- Always

Ending

Thailand

Opening VCR

- Burn The Floor
- The Crown
- Super
- Mr. Simple (Super Show 5 Version)

VCR

- Ticky Tocky
- Paradox
- Mystery

MENT
VCR

- Corazón Perdido (Lost Heart) (Yesung Solo)
- Blue Moon + California Love (Donghae Solo)
- If I Were Him + Dreams Come True (Ryeowook Solo)
- Be (Eunhyuk Solo)
- I Can't (Super Junior-K.R.Y.)

MENT

- My Wish
- Callin'

VCR

- Spy (Opera Version)
- Rokkugo (Opera Version)
- Mamacita (Ayaya) (Opera Version)

MENT

- Latte (Leeteuk, Shindong, Siwon)
- House Party
- Everyday
- Wonder Boy
- Let's Dance

MENT

- Devil
- Don't Wait
- Mango

VCR

- At Gwanghwamun (Rock Version) (Kyuhyun Solo)
- B.A.D + Danger (Super Junior-D&E)
- Black Suit
- Sorry, Sorry
- Bonamana

Encore VCR (Analogue Radio)

- More Days With You
- Walkin'

MENT

- Happiness

Ending

Asia

Opening VCR

- Burn The Floor
- The Crown
- Super
- Mr. Simple (Super Show 5 Version)

VCR

- Ticky Tocky
- Paradox
- Mystery

MENT

- 2YA2YAO! ^{Excluding Singapore}

VCR

- Floral Sense (Yesung) ^{Vietnam}
- Hanamizuki (Super Junior-K.R.Y.) ^{Japan}
- I Can't (Super Junior-K.R.Y.) ^{+ If Only You... (Vietnam)}
- Believe

MENT

- My Wish
- Callin'
- Celebrate ^{Manila & Vietnam}

VCR

- Spy (Opera Version)
- Rokkugo (Opera Version)
- Mamacita (Ayaya) (Opera Version)

MENT

- Latte (Leeteuk, Shindong, Siwon)
- House Party
- Everyday
- Wonder Boy
- Let's Dance

MENT

- Devil
- Mango

VCR

- B.A.D + Danger (Super Junior-D&E)
- Black Suit
- Sorry, Sorry
- Bonamana

Encore VCR (Analogue Radio)

- More Days With You
- Walkin'

MENT

- Happiness ^{Excluding Japan}
- Bambina ^{Japan}

Ending

Latin America

Opening VCR

- Burn The Floor
- The Crown
- Super
- Mr. Simple (Super Show 5 Version)

VCR

- One More Time
- Lo Siento
- Devil
- Mango

MENT

- Mamacita

VCR

- Small Things (Yesung)
- If Only You... (Super Junior-K.R.Y.)
- Believe
- Callin'
- Celebrate

VCR

- B.A.D + Danger (Super Junior-D&E)
- Black Suit
- Sorry, Sorry
- Bonamana

Encore VCR (Analogue Radio)

- More Days With You
- Walkin'

MENT

- Wonder Boy
- Let's Dance
- Ahora Te Puedes Marchar

Ending

Manila (August 6, 2022)

Fan Meeting

- My Wish
- Callin'
- More Days With You

Notes

- The Manila leg of Super Show 9 was postponed following the death of Eunhyuk's father.
- Super Junior still appeared at the Mall of Asia Arena on August 6, 2022, to personally apologize to Filipino fans and hold a fan meeting instead of the concert.
- Eunhyuk was absent following his father's death, while Siwon was unable to attend after testing positive for COVID-19.
- The members expressed their apologies for the postponement and promised to return to Manila with Eunhyuk and Siwon.
- The six members who attended performed "My Wish," "Callin'" and "More Days With You" following their messages to fans.
- Leeteuk clarified that the concert was postponed rather than cancelled, and said he had requested that their next Manila concert be held over two days.
- Fans were advised to keep their tickets for the rescheduled concert.
- Source: ABS-CBN News (August 7, 2022)
South Korea (Encore)

Opening VCR

- Burn The Floor
- Ticky Tocky
- Paradox
- Mystery
- It's You (without Shindong)

MENT

- Mamacita (without Shindong)
- Mr. Simple (Super Show 5 Version - Shingdong limited performance)

VCR

- The One I Love (April 15) / When We Were Us (April 16) (Super Junior-K.R.Y.)
- One More Chance
- Memories
- At Least I Still Have You (Korean Version) (Super Junior-M)

MENT (Super Junior-M)

- Rewind (Korean Version) (Zhoumi)

VCR

- Super Clap (Trot Version)
- U (Trot Version)
- Spy (Trot Version)

VCR

- Dorothy (Leeteuk, Shindong, Siwon)
- Way For Love

MENT

- Magic
- Shake It Up!
- Let's Dance

VCR

- Zero + Danger (Super Junior-D&E)
- Black Suit
- Sorry, Sorry
- Bonamana

Encore VCR (The Melody)

- You & I

MENT

- Too Many Beautiful Girls
- Miracle

Ending

== Notes ==
- Yesung performed "Floral Sense" in Vietnam.
- Yesung performed "Choo Choo" in Vietnam.

== Tour dates ==
Date	City	Country	Venue	Audience
July 15, 2022	Seoul	South Korea	Jamsil Arena; Beyond Live (Note: July 17 only.)	—
July 16, 2022	Seoul	South Korea	Jamsil Arena; Beyond Live	—
July 17, 2022	Seoul	South Korea	Jamsil Arena; Beyond Live	—
July 30, 2022	Pak Kret	Thailand	Impact Arena	—
July 31, 2022	Pak Kret	Thailand	Impact Arena	—
August 6, 2022	Pasay	Philippines	SM Mall of Asia Arena (Fan meeting; concert postponed)	—
September 3, 2022	Singapore		Singapore Indoor Stadium	7,500
September 17, 2022	Tangerang	Indonesia	Indonesia Convention Exhibition	—
October 10, 2022	Kuala Lumpur	Malaysia	Axiata Arena	10,000
November 19, 2022	Hong Kong	China	AsiaWorld–Arena	28,000
November 20, 2022	Hong Kong	China	AsiaWorld–Arena	28,000
November 25, 2022	Taipei	Taiwan	Taipei Arena	—
November 26, 2022	Taipei	Taiwan	Taipei Arena	—
November 27, 2022	Taipei	Taiwan	Taipei Arena	—
December 17, 2022	Pasay	Philippines	SM Mall of Asia Arena	—
December 18, 2022	Pasay	Philippines	SM Mall of Asia Arena	—
February 7, 2023	Santiago	Chile	Movistar Arena	—
February 9, 2023	São Paulo	Brazil	Espaço Unimed	—
February 11, 2023	Lima	Peru	Estadio San Marcos	25,000
February 14, 2023	Mexico City	Mexico	Arena CDMX	14,000
February 15, 2023	Mexico City	Mexico	Arena CDMX	—
March 11, 2023	Ho Chi Minh City	Vietnam	Quân khu 7 Stadium	—
March 18, 2023	Tokorozawa	Japan	Belluna Dome	—
March 19, 2023	Tokorozawa	Japan	Belluna Dome	—
April 15, 2023	Seoul	South Korea	Jamsil Arena; Beyond Live (Note: April 16 only.)	—
April 16, 2023	Seoul	South Korea	Jamsil Arena; Beyond Live	—
Total				N/A

== Cancelled and rescheduled shows ==
List of cancelled, postponed, and relocated shows, showing the original date, city, country, venue, reason, and references
Date	City	Country	Venue	Details	Ref.
February 15, 2023	Mexico City	Mexico	Agustín Melgar Olympic Velodrome	The venue was changed following fan complaints and a boycott over the venue's facilities.	
August 6, 2022	Pasay	Philippines	SM Mall of Asia Arena	The concert was postponed following the death of Eunhyuk's father. Super Junior held a fan meeting at the venue on the original concert date, where the members apologized to fans and performed "My Wish", "Callin'" and "More Days With You". Eunhyuk and Siwon were absent from the fan meeting but joined the rescheduled concerts in December.	

== Personnel ==
- Artists: Super Junior members Leeteuk, Yesung, Shindong, Eunhyuk, Donghae, Siwon, Ryeowook, Kyuhyun
- Tour organizer: SM Entertainment
