= Mamacita (Super Junior song) =

- Japanese CD version cover

Single by Super Junior

from the album Mamacita
- Language: Korean; Japanese
- B-side: "Lunar Eclipse (JP)"
- Released: August 29, 2014; December 17, 2014 (JP)
- Recorded: 2014
- Studio: SM Booming System (Seoul)
- Genre: New jack swing
- Length: 3:28
- Label: SM; KT; Avex Trax
- Composers: Yoo Young-jin; Teddy Riley; Dominique "DOM" Rodriguez; Lee Hyun-seung; Jason J. "JSol" Lopez
- Lyricists: Yoo Young-jin (Korean); Tanaka Hidenori (Japanese)
- Producers: Teddy Riley; Yoo Young-jin

Super Junior singles chronology
| "Blue World" (2013) | "Mamacita" (2014) | "This Is Love" (2014) |

Music video
- "Mamacita" on YouTube

"Mamacita" is a song recorded in two languages (Korean and Japanese) by South Korean boy band Super Junior. The Korean version was released as the lead single of the group's seventh Korean studio album of the same name, through SM Entertainment on August 29, 2014, while the Japanese version was released on December 17, 2014, by Avex Trax.

In Japan, the single reached number-one on the weekly Oricon Singles Chart and sold over 69,000 copies.

== Background ==
On August 21, 2014, SM Entertainment posted teaser images and confirmed that Super Junior will release their seventh studio album at the end of the month. On August 23, another teaser image was revealed showing the group in cowboy theme and confirming "Mamacita" as the lead single. Two days later, SM uploaded an image teaser video and announced that the group will experiment with new music and performances that are different from their previous releases.

The Japanese version of "Mamacita (Ayaya)" was released on December 17, which contained on the B-Side song named "Lunar Eclipse". The single was released in three different editions: CD-only, CD+DVD and E.L.F JAPAN version.

== Composition ==
"Mamacita" features the vocals of ten Super Junior members — Leeteuk, Heechul, Kangin, Sungmin, Donghae, Shindong, Eunhyuk, Siwon, Ryeowook, and Kyuhyun. This is the first Super Junior single without Yesung's vocals as he was away on his mandatory military service, but he expressed his support for the other members. Similarly, this is Leeteuk's first appearance since "Spy" in 2012 after his discharge from the military service on July 29, 2014.

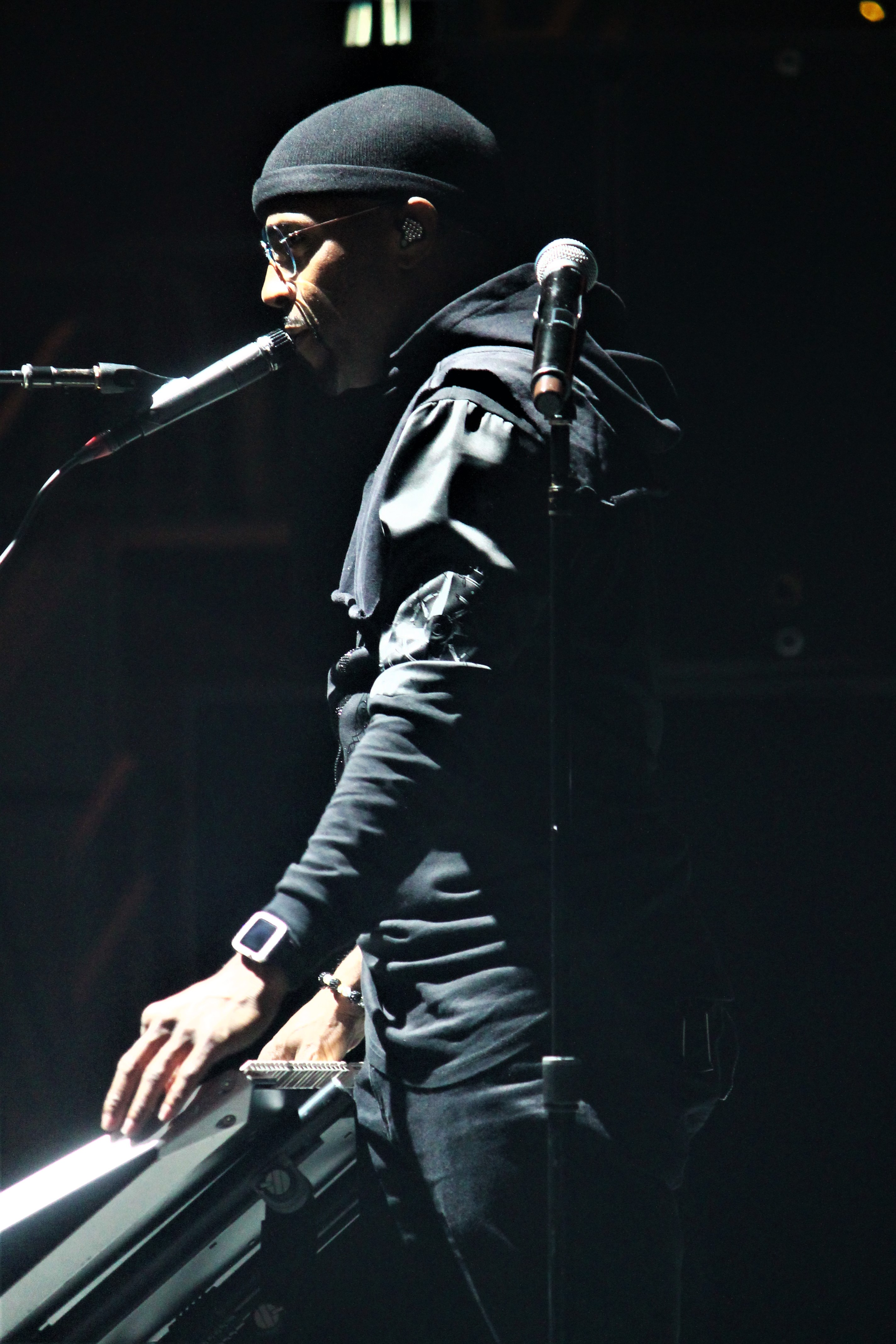
American record producer Teddy Riley (pictured in 2017) is credited as co-producer and the co-composer of the song

"Mamacita" is a new jack swing song with an impressive drum sound and piano melody based on Indian percussion rhythm. It was co-composed by SM's in-house songwriter and record producer Yoo Young-jin, Teddy Riley, DOM, Lee Hyun-seung, and "J.SOL" Lopez.

The lyrics were penned by Yoo in Korean with Tanaka Hidenori in Japanese version, narrating a scenario of sharing one's heart and appealing for sympathy for various problems and pains in the world.

== Music video ==
The music video was released on August 28. It was directed by Hong Won-ki and Leeteuk introduced it as "SM's first music video with a story."

The comedic music video is categorized as a western genre showing old west in the background. It features the band as they transformed into a sheriff, robber, matador, blacksmith, gambler, bartender, and fruit seller.

On September 12, Billboard ranked the music video in the first place of their "10 Most Viewed K-Pop Videos Around the World: August 2014" list.

On June 10, 2021, the music video became the fifth Super Junior music video to achieve 100 million views, joining their previous hits — "Mr. Simple", "Bonamana", "Sorry, Sorry", and "No Other".

== Live performances ==
Super Junior performed "Mamacita" live for the first time during their appearance at Music Bank on August 28. They performed the song on Show! Music Core on August 30 and at Inkigayo on the following day. The group returned to Show! Music Core on September 13.

The song appears on the setlist of the group's headlining concerts, Super Shows 6, 7, and 8, and 9. In particular, during their Super Show 9 concert, they performed the song in opera arrangement. In 2016, Yesung included the song as part of his first solo Japanese tour Super Junior medley set list. In 2025, the song was featured in the setlist of the group's 20th anniversary concert, Super Show 10.

== Track listing ==
Japanese CD single
| No. | Title | Lyrics | Music | Length |
|---|---|---|---|---|
| 1. | "Mamacita (Ayaya)" | Tanaka Hidenori | Yoo Young-jin; DOM; Lee Hyun-seung; J.SOL; Teddy Riley | 3:30 |
| 2. | "Lunar Eclipse" | Tanaka Hidenori | Kenzie | 4:10 |
| 3. | "Mamacita (Ayaya)" (Less Vocal) | | Yoo Young-jin; DOM; Lee Hyun-seung; J.SOL; Teddy Riley | 3:30 |
| 4. | "Lunar Eclipse" (Less Vocal) | | Kenzie | 4:10 |
| Total length: | | | | 15:20 |

Limited Edition DVD – Japanese
| No. | Title | Length |
|---|---|---|
| 1. | "Mamacita" (Music Video) |
| 2. | "Mamacita" (Music Video Making-of) |

== Charts ==
| Chart (2014) | Peak position |
|---|---|
| Japan Singles (Oricon) | 1 |
| South Korea (Gaon) | 11 |
| US World Digital Songs (Billboard) | 4 |

== Accolades ==
Music program awards
| Program | Date |
|---|---|
| Show Champion | September 10, 2014 |
| Show Champion | September 17, 2014 |
| M Countdown | September 11, 2014 |
| Music Bank | September 12, 2014 |
| Music Bank | September 19, 2014 |
| Show! Music Core | September 13, 2014 |
| Show! Music Core | September 20, 2014 |
| Inkigayo | September 14, 2014 |
| Inkigayo | September 21, 2014 |

== Credits and personnel ==
Credits adapted from album's liner notes.

=== Studio ===
- SM Booming System – recording, mixing, digital editing
- Sonic Korea – mastering

=== Personnel ===
- SM Entertainment – executive producer
- Lee Soo-man – producer
- Super Junior – vocals, background vocals
- Yoo Young-jin – Korean lyrics, producer, composition, vocal directing, background vocals, recording, mixing, digital editing, music and sound supervisor
- Teddy Riley – producer, composition, arrangement
- Hidenori Tanaka – Japanese lyrics
- Lee Hyun-seung – composition, arrangement
- Dominique "DOM" Rodriguez – composition, arrangement
- Jason J. "JSOL" Lopez – composition
- Jeon Hoon – mastering

== Release history ==
Release dates and formats
| Region | Date | Version | Format(s) | Distributor |
|---|---|---|---|---|
| South Korea | August 29, 2014 | Korean | Digital download; streaming | SM; KT |
| Various | August 29, 2014 | Korean | Digital download; streaming | SM |
| Japan | December 17, 2014 | Japanese | CD single; DVD | Avex Trax |
| Various | December 17, 2014 | Japanese | Digital download; streaming | Avex Trax |
