= The Road (Super Junior album) =

2022 studio album by Super Junior

- The Road: Keep On Going digital cover

Studio album by Super Junior
- Released: July 12, 2022 (Vol. 1); December 15, 2022 (Vol. 2); January 6, 2023 (Released)
- Studio: Golden Bell Tree Sound (Seoul); InGrid (Seoul); Prelude (Seoul); Seoul; SM Big Shot (Seoul); SM Concert Hall (Seoul); SM LVYIN (Seoul); SM SSSAM (Seoul); SM Starlight (Seoul)
- Genre: K-pop
- Length: 41:10
- Language: Korean
- Label: SM; Label SJ; Dreamus
- Producer: Lee Soo-man; Ryan S. Jhun; Gustav Nyström; Henrik Moreborg; 153/Joombas; 153CreatorsClub; Henrik Nordenback; Jonas Ekdahl; Joo Young-hoon; Yoo Hyun-jong

Super Junior chronology
The Road : Winter for Spring (2022)	The Road (2022)	Super Junior25 (2025)

Singles from The Road: Keep On Going
- 1. "Don't Wait" Released: June 29, 2022; 2. "Mango" Released: July 12, 2022

Vol. 2
- The Road: Celebration digital cover

Singles from The Road: Celebration
- 1. "Celebrate" Released: December 15, 2022

The Road is the twelfth Korean-language studio album (thirteenth overall) by South Korean boy band Super Junior released on January 6, 2023. The album was originally released in two parts, The Road: Keep On Going and The Road: Celebration. The former was released on July 12, 2022, while the latter was released on December 15, 2022, by SM Entertainment. The album features the vocals of nine Super Junior members, which are Leeteuk, Heechul, Yesung, Shindong, Eunhyuk, Donghae, Siwon, Ryeowook and Kyuhyun.

== Background ==
On June 13, 2022, Label SJ released the concept trailer for their eleventh album.

On June 28, 2022, Super Junior released the track list for Vol.1 of their eleventh album. Five tracks were included in Vol.1. The title song for the album was "Mango".

Super Junior released the music video for their second track, "Don't Wait", on June 29, 2022.

On November 28, SM released the first set of teasers for The Road Vol. 2: Celebration, with a set release date of December 16.

== Promotion ==
=== Super Show 9 ===
On July 15 to July 17, the group embarked on the album supporting tour, Super Show 9 at the Jamsil Arena in Seoul. They first performed "Celebrate" during the Philippines stop of the tour on December 17, 2022.

== Track listing ==
The Road: Keep On Going Vol.1 track listing
No.	Title	Lyrics	Music	Arrangement	Length
1.	"Mango"	Kang Eun-jeong	Ryan Jhun; Gustav Nyström; Moa Pettersson Hammar; Robin Stjernberg	Ryan Jhun; Gustav Nyström	3:19
2.	"Don't Wait"	Lee Joo-hyun (153/Joombas)	Andreas Moe; Freddie Liljegren; Henrik Moreborg	Henrik Moreborg	2:59
3.	"My Wish"	Jisoo Park (153/Joombas)	Jisoo Park (153/Joombas); Hyuk Shin (153/Joombas); MRey (153CreatorsClub); Papi Lee (153/Joombas)	Jisoo Park (153/Joombas); Hyuk Shin (153/Joombas); MRey (153CreatorsClub); Papi Lee (153/Joombas)	4:06
4.	"Everyday"	Jeon Won-kyo (JamFactory)	Alexander Karlsson (JeL); Alexej Viktorovich (JeL); John Mars	JeL; John Mars	2:59
5.	"Always"	U1 (153/Joombas); Yi Yi-jin; Eunhyuk	U1 (153/Joombas); l.vin (153/Joombas); NEUL	l.vin (153/Joombas)	3:52
Total length:					17:15

The Road: Celebration Vol.2 track listing
No.	Title	Lyrics	Music	Arrangement	Length
1.	"Celebrate"	Kang Eun-jeong	Henrik Nordenback; Christian Fast; Gabriel Brandes	Henrik Nordenback	3:33
2.	"Hate Christmas"	Maryjane; Mok Ji-min	Jonas Ekdahl; Rickard Bonde Truumeel; Mike Watson	Jonas Ekdahl; Rickard Bonde Truumeel	3:10
3.	"Snowman"	Peomkin (153/Joombas)	Humbler; Davey Nate; Timothy "C Minor" Zimnoch	Humbler	3:14
4.	"White Love"	Lee Seung-ho	Joo Young-hoon	Melange	2:51
5.	"If Only You" (Super Junior-K.R.Y.; special track)	Yoo Hyun-jong	Yoo Hyun-jong	Yoo Hyun-jong	3:51
Total length:					16:39

== Credits and personnel ==
Credits adapted from the album's liner notes.

Studio

The Road: Keep On Going Vol.1

- SM Big Shot Studio – recording (track 1–4), engineered for mix, mixing (track 4)
- SM Starlight Studio – recording (track 1, 4–5), digital editing, engineered for mix (track 1)
- SM SSAM Studio – recording (track 1, 3–4), engineered for mix (track 1, 3)
- SM LVYIN Studio – recording (track 2, 4–5), engineered for mix (track 3, 5), digital editing, mixing (track 5)
- SM Yellow Tail Studio – recording (track 3), engineered for mix (track 2)
- Prelude Studio – recording (track 3)
- Seoul Studio – recording (track 3)
- Doobdoob Studio – digital editing (track 1–3)
- Sound Pool Studio – digital editing (track 4)
- SM Blue Ocean Studio – mixing (track 1)
- SM Concert Hall Studio – mixing (track 2–3)
- 821 Sound – mastering (all tracks)

The Road: Celebration Vol.2

- Golden Bell Tree Sound – recording (track 1–4)
- SM Concert Hall Studio – recording, mixing (track 5)
- Ingrid Studio – recording, digital editing (track 5)
- Sound Pool Studio – digital editing (track 2), mixing (track 4)
- Doobdoob Studio – digital editing (track 3–4)
- SM Big Shot Studio – engineered for mix (track 1, 5), mixing (track 2)
- SM SSAM Studio – engineered for mix (track 2)
- SM LVYIN Studio – engineered for mix (track 3–4)
- SM Blue Ocean Studio – mixing (track 1)
- SM Starlight Studio – mixing (track 3)
- 821 Sound – mastering (all tracks)

Personnel

- Label SJ – executive producer
- Lee Soo-man – producer
- Lee Sung-soo – executive supervisor
- Tak Young-jun – production director, executive supervisor
- Yoo Young-jin – music and sound supervisor

The Road: Keep On Going Vol.1

- Super Junior – vocals (all tracks)
  - Eunhyuk – lyrics (track 5)
- Kang Eun-jeong – lyrics (track 1)
- Ryan Jhun – composition, arrangement (track 1)
- Gustav Nyström – composition, arrangement (track 1)
- Moa Pettersson Hammar – composition (track 1)
- Robin Stjernberg – composition (track 1)
- Lee Joo-hyun (153/Joombas) – lyrics (track 2)
- Andreas Moe – composition (track 2)
- Freddie Liljegren – composition (track 2)
- Henrik Moreborg – composition, arrangement (track 2)
- Jisoo Park (153/Joombas) – lyrics, composition, arrangement, vocal directing, background vocals, whistle (track 3)
- Hyuk Shin (153/Joombas) – composition, arrangement (track 3)
- MRey (153CreatorsClub) – composition, arrangement, synthesizer (track 3)
- Papi Lee (153/Joombas) – composition, arrangement (track 3)
- Jeon Won-kyo (JamFactory) – lyrics (track 4)
- Alexander Karlsson (JeL) – composition, arrangement, background vocals (track 4)
- Alexej Viktorovich (JeL) – composition, arrangement (track 4)
- John Mars – composition, arrangement (track 4)
- U1 (153/Joombas) – lyrics, composition (track 5)
- Yi Yi-jin – lyrics (track 5)
- l.vin (153/Joombas) – composition, arrangement, drums, bass, guitar, synthesizer (track 5)
- NEUL – composition (track 5)
- G-High – vocal directing (track 1–2)
- Lee Yoo-ra – background vocals (track 1–2)
- Jo Hyung-won – background vocals (track 1–2)
- Yoo Young-jin – background vocals (track 1)
- Josefine Wassler – background vocals (track 2)
- Jeon Seung-woo – vocal directing, background vocals (track 4–5)
- Cha I-hwan – bass (track 3)
- Joo Young-hoon – drums (track 3)
- Kang Gun-hoo – guitar (track 3)
- Gil Eun-kyung – piano (track 3)
- Nile Lee – strings conducting, strings arrangement (track 3)
- Yung – strings (track 3)
- Lee Min-kyu – recording (track 1–4), engineered for mix, mixing (track 4)
- Jeong Yoo-ra – recording (track 1, 4–5), digital editing, engineered for mix (track 1)
- Kang Eun-ji – recording (track 1, 3–4), engineered for mix (track 1, 3)
- Lee Ji-hong – recording (track 2, 4–5), engineered for mix (track 3, 5), digital editing, mixing (track 5)
- Noh Min-ji – recording (track 3), engineered for mix (track 2)
- Lee Chang-sun – recording (track 3)
- Jeong Ki-hong – recording (track 3)
- Choi Da-in – recording (track 3)
- Lee Chan-mi – recording (track 3)
- Choi Eun-mi – recording assistant (track 3)
- Jang Woo-young – digital editing (track 1–3)
- Jeong Ho-jin – digital editing (track 4)
- Kim Cheol-sun – mixing (track 1)
- Nam Koong-jin – mixing (track 2–3)
- Kwon Nam-woo – mastering (all tracks)

The Road: Celebration Vol.2

- Super Junior – vocals (track 1–4)
  - Super Junior-K.R.Y. – vocals (track 5)
- Kang Eun-jeong – lyrics (track 1)
- Henrik Nordenback – composition, arrangement (track 1)
- Christian Fast – composition (track 1)
- Gabriel Brandes – composition (track 1)
- Maryjane – lyrics (track 2)
- Mok Ji-min – lyrics (track 2)
- Jonas Ekdahl – composition, arrangement (track 2)
- Rickard Bonde Truumeel – composition, arrangement (track 2)
- Mike Watson – composition (track 2)
- Peomkin (153/Joombas) – lyrics (track 3)
- Humbler – composition, arrangement (track 3)
- Davey Nate – composition (track 3)
- Timothy "C Minor" Zimnoch – composition (track 3)
- Lee Seung-ho – lyrics (track 4)
- Joo Young-hoon – composition (track 4)
- Melange – arrangement, vocal directing (track 4)
- Yoo Hyun-jong – lyrics, composition, arrangement, vocal directing (track 5)
- G-High – vocal directing (track 1)
- Gesture – vocal directing (track 2)
- Jeon Min-kyung – vocal directing (track 3)
- Heron – background vocals (track 1)
- Kang Tae-woo a.k.a. Soulman – background vocals (track 2–3, 5)
- Onestar – background vocals (track 4)
- Seo Sang-hwan – bass (track 3)
- Park Joo-hoon – drums (track 3)
- Jeong Ki-woon – guitar (track 3)
- Kim Jin-soo – piano (track 3)
- Woo Sang-seok – harmonica (track 3)
- Choi Hoon – bass (track 5)
- Lee Seong-ryeol – guitar (track 5)
- Gil Eun-kyung – piano (track 5)
- Nile Lee – strings conducting, strings arrangement (track 5)
- Yung – strings (track 5)
- Jeong Il-jin – recording (track 1–3)
- Kim Kwang-min – recording (track 2–4)
- Nam Koong-jin – recording, mixing (track 5)
- Jeong Eun-kyung – recording, digital editing (track 5)
- Kang Sun-young – digital editing (track 1)
- Jeong Ho-jin – digital editing (track 2)
- Jang Woo-young – digital editing (track 3–4)
- Lee Min-kyu – engineered for mix (track 1, 5), mixing (track 2)
- Kang Eun-ji – engineered for mix (track 2)
- Lee Ji-hong – engineered for mix (track 3–4)
- Kim Cheol-sun – mixing (track 1)
- Jeong Yoo-ra – mixing (track 3)
- Kim Han-koo – mixing (track 4)
- Kwon Nam-woo – mastering (all tracks)

== Charts ==
=== Weekly charts ===
Weekly chart performance for The Road: Keep On Going
Chart (2022)	Peak position
Japanese Albums (Oricon)	8
Japanese Combined Albums (Oricon)	9
Japanese Hot Albums (Billboard Japan)	7
South Korean Albums (Circle)	3

Weekly chart performance for The Road: Celebration
Chart (2022–2023)	Peak position
Japanese Albums (Oricon)	10
Japanese Combined Albums (Oricon)	12
Japanese Hot Albums (Billboard Japan)	7
South Korean Albums (Circle)	1

Weekly chart performance for The Road
Chart (2023)	Peak position
Japanese Albums (Oricon)	42
Japanese Hot Albums (Billboard Japan)	43
South Korean Albums (Circle)	9

=== Monthly charts ===
Monthly chart performance for The Road: Keep On Going
Chart (2022)	Peak position
Japanese Albums (Oricon)	28
South Korean Albums (Circle)	13

Monthly chart performance for The Road: Celebration
Chart (2022–2023)	Peak position
Japanese Albums (Oricon)	22
South Korean Albums (Circle)	9

Monthly chart performance for The Road
Chart (2023)	Peak position
South Korean Albums (Circle)	24

=== Year-end charts ===
Year-end chart performance for The Road: Keep On Going
Chart (2022)	Position
South Korean Albums (Circle)	81

Year-end chart performance for The Road: Celebration
Chart (2022)	Position
South Korean Albums (Circle)	88

== Release history ==
Release history for The Road
Region	Date	Format	Version	Label	Ref
South Korea	July 12, 2022	CD	Vol. 1: Keep on Going	SM; Label SJ; Dreamus	
Taiwan	July 12, 2022	Digital download; streaming	Vol. 1: Keep on Going	Avex Taiwan	
Various	July 12, 2022	Digital download; streaming	Vol. 1: Keep on Going	SM; Label SJ	
South Korea	December 15, 2022	CD	Vol. 2: Celebration	SM; Label SJ; Dreamus	
Taiwan	December 15, 2022	Digital download; streaming	Vol. 2: Celebration	Avex Taiwan	
Various	December 15, 2022	Digital download; streaming	Vol. 2: Celebration	SM; Label SJ	
