= Callin' =

Single by Super Junior

from the album The Road: Winter for Spring
- Language: Korean
- B-side: "Analogue Radio"
- Released: February 28, 2022
- Studio: SM SSAM (Seoul); SM Yellow Tail (Seoul)
- Genre: Pop rock; alternative rock
- Length: 3:48
- Label: SM; Label SJ; Dreamus
- Songwriter: Kenzie
- Producer: Kenzie

Super Junior singles chronology
"House Party" (2021)	"Callin'" (2022)	"Mango" (2022)

Music video
- "Callin'" on YouTube

"Callin'" is a song recorded by South Korean boy band Super Junior for their single album, The Road: Winter for Spring. It was released alongside the single album on February 28, 2022, by SM Entertainment and Label SJ, with Dreamus handling the distribution.

== Background ==
In 2021, Super Junior released their 10th Korean studio album, The Renaissance, on March 16, 2021, fronted by singles "The Melody" and "House Party". On February 14, 2022, Label SJ announced that the group will release a single album as "welcome gift" for fans at home and abroad by capturing Super Junior's unique musical world. The release date for The Road: Winter for Spring was confirmed two days later, scheduled to be released on February 28. "Callin'" was announced as the lead single of the single album alongside the teaser music video few days later.

On the 22nd, more details of "Callin'" were announced: the song lies within pop rock genre, and written by long-time contributor, Kenzie, who was also the producer of the song. For the next two days, the label continues to release teaser images and teaser for the music video. An interview video was uploaded on the 25th, where the members introduced the track and commenting on its production. The single was released with its music video, in tandem with the single album on the 28th.

== Composition ==
"Callin'" is described as a pop rock song that was written and produced by long-time contributor Kenzie. She previously wrote the group's previous hits such as "No Other", "Opera", and "Devil". Rolling Stone India labeled the song as an alternative rock ballad.

The song was composed in the key of C Major with the tempo of 160 BPM. Built on delicate and "beautiful" melody, the lyrics narrate the characters do not want to miss a single day of love.

Member Siwon introduced the track as "an absolutely wonderful song", while Ryeowook recounted how the members instantly loved the song when they heard the demo. Leader Leeteuk mentioned how the song warms his heart, with Heechul adding that the fans can listen to the song during winter or spring.

Kenzie instructed Leeteuk to sing with more gravelly voice and remove the emotions, which he ended up recording in an indie band manner.

== Music video ==
Two music videos were released for the song. The "Winter for Spring" version featured an animation, while the "Winter" did not. The video shows a man who locks himself in a room of his heart with a woman waiting for him outside of the room, as the season changes.

During a radio interview with Kim Shin-young on MBC FM4U, Shindong initially thought the storyboard was awkward with the animations and its back and forth, before liking how it eventually turned out.

== Live performances ==
Super Junior debuted "Callin'" live on stage for the first time during their March 3 appearance on M Countdown. It was performed on Show! Music Core and Inkigayo afterwards.

The song was later featured in the setlist of their Super Show 9: Road world concert tour.

== Chart ==
Chart (2022)	Peak position
South Korea Downloads (Gaon)	10

== Credits ==
Credits adapted from the single album's liner notes.

Studio

- SM SSAM Studio – recording, digital editing
- SM Yellow Tail Studio – recording
- SM Starlight Studio – engineered for mix
- Doobdoob Studio – digital editing
- SM Blue Ocean Studio – mixing
- 821 Sound – mastering

Personnel

- Label SJ – executive producer
- SM Entertainment – executive supervisor
- Lee Soo-man – producer
- Tak Young-jun – production director
- Yoo Young-jin – music and sound supervisor
- Super Junior – vocals
- Kenzie – producer, songwriter, vocal directing, piano
- Jeong Su-wan – guitar
- Kang Eun-ji – recording, digital editing
- Noh Min-ji – recording
- Jeong Yoo-ra – engineered for mix
- Jang Woo-young – digital editing
- Kim Cheol-sun – mixing
- Kwon Nam-woo – mastering

== Release history ==
Release history for "Callin'"
Region	Date	Format	Label
South Korea	February 28, 2022	Digital download; streaming	SM; Label SJ; Dreamus
Various	February 28, 2022	Digital download; streaming	SM; Label SJ
