= Super Junior25 =

2025 studio album by Super Junior

- Digital cover

Studio album by Super Junior
- Released: July 8, 2025
- Studio: SM Aube (Seoul); SM Azure (Seoul); SM Droplet (Seoul); SM LVYIN (Seoul); SM Wavelet (Seoul); SM Yellow Tail (Seoul)
- Genre: K-pop; EDM; hip-hop; R&B
- Length: 28:15
- Language: Korean
- Label: SM; Kakao
- Producer: Dwilly; Foleyhats; Matthew Tishler; Crash Cove; Dino Medanhodzic; Kangta; Aftrshok (The Hub); DeadBear; Bluar; Rouno; Jelly; 17; Jake K (ARTiffect); Siwore (ARTiffect)

Super Junior chronology
The Road (2022)	Super Junior25 (2025)

Singles from Super Junior25
- 1. "Express Mode" Released: July 8, 2025

Super Junior25 is the thirteenth Korean-language studio album (fourteenth overall) by South Korean boy band Super Junior, released on July 8, 2025 by SM Entertainment. As part of their twentieth anniversary, the album features the vocals of nine Super Junior members, which are Leeteuk, Heechul, Yesung, Shindong, Eunhyuk, Donghae, Siwon, Ryeowook and Kyuhyun.

== Background ==
In June 2025, SM Entertainment announced that Super Junior would release a new full-length album the next month as part of the group's twentieth anniversary celebrations. The name Super Junior25 was chosen by the members of Super Junior as a callback to the name of their first album, Super Junior05, released in 2005.

== Composition ==
The album contains nine tracks and featured various genres: K-pop, EDM, hip-hop, R&B, and acoustic pop. Lead single "Express Mode" was described as a club-pop song.

== Promotion ==
On the day of the album's release, Super Junior hosted a live countdown event via YouTube and TikTok as well as an online showcase broadcast via YouTube and Beyond Live. They first performed title track Express Mode on Mnet's M Countdown on 10 July, also appearing on Music Bank, Show! Music Core and Inkigayo in the days following its release. On July 15, they appeared on Killing Voice to perform the single.

In August 2025, Super Junior began their world tour Super Show 10 with three concerts at the KSPO Dome in Seoul, performing songs from Super Junior25 in front of fans for the first time. Super Show 10 is set to visit 16 cities around the world before its conclusion in March 2026.

== Track listing ==
Super Junior25 track listing
No.	Title	Lyrics	Music	Arrangement	Length
1.	"Express Mode"	Rick Bridges; Lee Hyung-seok	David Wilson; Jason Hahs; Justin Starling	Dwilly	3:08
2.	"Haircut"	Lee Seu-ran	Ninos Hanna; Wiljam; Niklas Jarelius Persson; Adam Ben Yahia	Foleyhats	2:51
3.	"Air"	Yoon Ye-ji	Matthew Tishler; Hyun; Crash Cove	Tishler; Cove	3:11
4.	"Delight"	Lee Yi-jin	Dino Medanhodzic; Anne Judith Wik; Moa "Cazzi Opeia" Carlebecker; Kyle Wong	Medanhodzic	3:02
5.	"I Know"	PIT300	Kangta; PIT300	Kangta	4:00
6.	"Say Less"	Jung Hye-sun	Aftrshok (The Hub); DeadBear; Bluar; Jacob Aaron (The Hub); Justin David Joyce	Aftrshok (The Hub); DeadBear; Bluar	2:46
7.	"D.N.A."	Kang Eun-jeong	Avenue 52; Sqvare; Rouno	Rouno	3:00
8.	"Finale"	Yoo Ji-sang	Donghae; Rokstaxil; Jelly; 17; Ham Sung-hoon; Ryan Shin	Jelly; 17	3:11
9.	"Stuck with You" (우리의 꽃말; Uriui kkonmal; 'Our flower language')	Na Jeong-ah; Jiggy	Jake K (ARTiffect); Etham Basden; Boran; Hautboi Rich; Siwore (ARTiffect	Jake K (ARTiffect); Siwore (ARTiffect)	3:06
Total length:					28:15

== Credits and personnel ==
Credits adapted from the album's liner notes.

Studio

- SM LVYIN Studio – recording (track 1, 6, 9), mixing (track 3)
- SM Droplet Studio – recording (track 1–2, 6–9), digital editing, engineered for mix (track 1, 5, 7–8)
- SM Yellow Tail Studio – recording (track 2–9), digital editing, engineered for mix (track 2)
- SM Wavelet Studio – recording (track 2–3, 5, 7), digital editing, engineered for mix (track 3, 9)
- SM Azure Studio – recording (track 2–3, 6)
- SM Aube Studio – recording (track 4), digital editing, engineered for mix (track 6–7)
- SM Big Shot Studio – engineered for mix (track 4), mixing (track 4, 9)
- SM Concert Hall Studio – mixing (track 1, 8)
- SM Blue Ocean Studio – mixing (track 2, 6)
- SM Starlight Studio – mixing (track 5)
- SM Blue Cup Studio – mixing (track 7)
- 821 Sound – mastering (all tracks)

Personnel

- SM Entertainment – executive producer
- Super Junior – vocals (all tracks)
  - Donghae – composition (track 8)
- Rick Bridges – lyrics (track 1)
- Lee Hyung-seok – lyrics (track 1)
- David Wilson a.k.a. Dwilly – producer, composition, arrangement (track 1)
- Jason Hahs – composition (track 1)
- Justin Starling – composition (track 1)
- Lee Seu-ran – lyrics (track 2)
- Wiljam (Foleyhats) – producer, composition, arrangement (track 2)
- Niklas Jarelius Persson (Foleyhats) – producer, composition, arrangement (track 2)
- Adam Benyahia – composition (track 2)
- Yoon Ye-ji – lyrics (track 3)
- Hyun – composition, background vocals (track 3)
- Matthew Tishler – producer, composition, arrangement (track 3)
- Crash Cove – producer, composition, arrangement (track 3)
- Lee Yi-jin – lyrics (track 4)
- Dino Medanhodzic – producer, composition, arrangement (track 4)
- Anne Judith Wik – composition (track 4)
- Moa "Cazzi Opeia" Carlebecker – composition (track 4)
- Kyle Wong – composition (track 4)
- PIT300 – lyrics, composition (track 5), vocal directing (track 4–5, 7), background vocals (track 1–2, 4–5)
- Kangta – producer, composition, arrangement, synthesizer, programming (track 5)
- Jung Hye-sun – lyrics (track 6)
- Aftrshok (The Hub) – producer, composition, arrangement (track 6)
- DeadBear – producer, composition, arrangement (track 6)
- Bluar – producer, composition, arrangement (track 6)
- Jacob Aaron (The Hub) – composition (track 6)
- Justin David Joyce – composition (track 6)
- Kang Eun-jeong – lyrics (track 7)
- Rouno – producer, composition, arrangement (track 7)
- Sqvare – composition (track 7)
- Avenue 52 – composition (track 7)
- Yoo Ji-sang – lyrics (track 8)
- Ham Sung-hoon – composition, guitar (track 8)
- Rokstaxil – composition (track 8)
- Jelly – producer, composition, arrangement (track 8)
- 17 – producer, composition, arrangement, drums, bass (track 8)
- Ryan Shin – composition (track 8)
- Na Jeong-ah – lyrics (track 9)
- Jiggy – lyrics (track 9)
- Etham Basden – composition (track 9)
- Hautboi Rich – composition (track 9)
- Jake K (ARTiffect) – producer, composition, arrangement, drums, bass, piano, synthesizer, strings (track 9)
- Boran – composition (track 9)
- Siwore (ARTiffect) – producer, composition, arrangement, drums, piano, synthesizer (track 9)
- G-High – vocal directing (track 1)
- Fuxxy (MonoTree) – vocal directing (track 2–3)
- Paprikaa – vocal directing (track 6)
- Joowon – background vocals (track 6–8)
- Emily Yeonseo Kim – vocal directing (track 8–9)
- Kang Tae-woo a.k.a. Soulman – background vocals (track 9)
- Lee Ji-hong – recording (track 1, 6, 9), mixing (track 3)
- Kim Joo-hyun – recording (track 1–2, 6–9), digital editing, engineered for mix (track 1, 5, 7–8)
- Noh Min-ji – recording (track 2–9), digital editing, engineered for mix (track 2)
- Kang Eun-ji – recording (track 2–3, 5, 7), digital editing, engineered for mix (track 3, 9)
- Kim Jae-yeon – recording (track 2–3, 6)
- Kim Hyo-joon – recording (track 4), digital editing, engineered for mix (track 6–7)
- Jeon Boo-yeon – digital editing (track 4)
- Lee Min-kyu – engineered for mix (track 4), mixing (track 4, 9)
- Nam Koong-jin – mixing (track 1, 8)
- Kim Cheol-sun – mixing (track 2, 6)
- Jeong Yoo-ra – mixing (track 5)
- Jung Eui-seok – mixing (track 7)
- Kwon Nam-woo – mastering (all tracks)

== Charts ==
=== Weekly charts ===
Weekly chart performance for Super Junior25
Chart (2025)	Peak position
Japanese Albums (Oricon)	7
Japanese Combined Albums (Oricon)	11
Japanese Download Albums (Billboard Japan)	2
Japanese Top Albums Sales (Billboard Japan)	6
South Korean Albums (Circle)	2

=== Monthly charts ===
Monthly chart performance for Super Junior25
Chart (2025)	Peak position
Japanese Albums (Oricon)	29
South Korean Albums (Circle)	7

=== Year-end charts ===
Year-end chart performance for Super Junior25
Chart (2025)	Position
South Korean Albums (Circle)	72

== Certifications ==
Certifications for Super Junior25
Region	Certification	Certified units/sales
South Korea (KMCA)	Platinum	250,000^{^}
^{^} Shipments figures based on certification alone.

== Release history ==
Release history for Super Junior25
Region	Date	Format	Label
Various	July 8, 2025	Digital download; streaming	SM
South Korea	July 8, 2025	CD	SM; Kakao
