= The Road: Winter for Spring =

2022 special single album by Super Junior

- Digital cover

Single album by Super Junior
- Released: February 28, 2022
- Studio: Doobdoob (Seoul); SM SSAM (Seoul); SM Starlight (Seoul); SM Yellow Tail (Seoul)
- Genre: Pop; Rock
- Length: 14:26
- Language: Korean
- Label: SM; Label SJ; Dreamus
- Producer: Lee Soo-man (exec.); Kenzie; KYUM LYK; Baek LYK

Super Junior chronology
The Renaissance (2021)	The Road: Winter for Spring (2022)	The Road (2022)

Singles from The Road: Winter for Spring
- 1. "Callin'" Released: February 28, 2022

The Road: Winter for Spring is a Korean-language single album by South Korean boy band Super Junior, released on February 28, 2022. The single album features the vocals of nine Super Junior members, which are Leeteuk, Heechul, Yesung, Shindong, Eunhyuk, Donghae, Siwon, Ryeowook and Kyuhyun.

== Background ==
On February 14, 2022, the group released a promotional image for the single album. On February 16, 2022, the group announced that they would release it on February 28, 2022. The behind-the-scenes of the music video for the lead single, "Callin'", was released on Super Junior's official YouTube channel on March 2, 2022.

== Promotion ==
The group held a live event on their official YouTube channel on March 1, 2022. They performed the lead single, "Callin'", on M Countdown on March 3, 2022, marking their comeback. They also made appearances on Music Core and Inkigayo.

== Track listing ==
The Road: Winter for Spring track listing
No.	Title	Lyrics	Music	Arrangement	Length
1.	"Callin'"	Kenzie	Kenzie	Kenzie	3:48
2.	"Analogue Radio"	Jo Yoon-kyung	KYUM LYK (153/Joombas); Baek LYK	KYUM LYK (153/Joombas); Baek LYK	3:25
3.	"Callin'" (instrumental)		Kenzie	Kenzie	3:48
4.	"Analogue Radio" (instrumental)		KYUM LYK (153/Joombas); Baek LYK	KYUM LYK (153/Joombas); Baek LYK	3:25
Total length:					14:26

== Charts ==
=== Weekly charts ===
Weekly chart performance for The Road: Winter for Spring
Chart (2022)	Peak position
South Korean Albums (Circle)	1

=== Year-end charts ===
Year-end chart performance for The Road: Winter for Spring
Chart (2022)	Position
South Korean Albums (Circle)	77

== Credits ==
Credits adapted from the single album's liner notes.

Studio

- SM Yellow Tail Studio – recording (track 1)
- SM SSAM Studio – recording (all tracks), digital editing (track 2)
- SM Starlight Studio – recording (track 2), engineered for mix (all tracks)
- Doobdoob Studio – recording (track 2), digital editing (all tracks)
- SM Blue Ocean Studio – mixing (track 1)
- SM Concert Hall Studio – mixing (track 2)
- 821 Sound – mastering (all tracks)

Personnel

- Label SJ – executive producer
- Lee Soo-man – producer
- Tak Young-jun – production director
- SM Entertainment – executive supervisor
- Yoo Young-jin – music and sound supervisor
- Super Junior – vocals (all tracks)
- Kenzie – producer, lyrics, composition, arrangement, vocal directing, piano (track 1)
- KYUM LYK (153/Joombas) – producer, composition, arrangement, drums, bass, piano, programming (track 2)
- Baek LYK – producer, composition, arrangement, drums, bass, piano, programming (tracks 2)
- Jo Yoon-kyung – lyrics (track 2)
- Jeon Seung-woo – vocal directing (track 2)
- Kang Tae-woo a.k.a. Soulman – background vocals (track 2)
- Jeong Su-wan – guitar (track 1)
- Kim Jin-kyu – guitar (track 2)
- Noh Min-ji – recording (track 1)
- Kang Eun-ji – recording (all tracks), digital editing (track 2)
- Jeong Yoo-ra – recording (track 2), engineered for mix (all tracks)
- Jang Woo-young – digital editing (track 1)
- Kim Hyun-gon – recording (track 2)
- Eugene Kwon – recording (track 2), digital editing (track 2)
- Kim Cheol-sun – mixing (track 1)
- Nam Koong-jin – mixing (track 2)
- Kwon Nam-woo – mastering (all tracks)

== Release history ==
Release history for The Road: Winter for Spring
Region	Date	Format	Label
South Korea	February 28, 2022	CD	SM; Label SJ; Dreamus
Various	February 28, 2022	Digital download; streaming	SM; Label SJ
