= Mr. Simple (song) =

2011 single by Super Junior

- Japanese CD version cover

Single by Super Junior

from the album Mr. Simple
- Language: Korean; Japanese
- B-side: "Snow White" (JP)
- Released: August 2, 2011 (KR); December 7, 2011 (JP)
- Recorded: 2011
- Studio: SM Booming System (Seoul)
- Genre: Dance-pop; synthpop
- Length: 3:59
- Label: SM; Avex Trax
- Composer: Yoo Young-jin
- Lyricists: Yoo Young-jin (Korean); Goro Matsui (Japanese)
- Producer: Yoo Young-jin

Super Junior singles chronology
"No Other" (2010)	"Mr. Simple" (2011)	"A-Cha" (2011)

Music video
- "Mr. Simple" on YouTube

"Mr. Simple" is a song recorded in two languages (Korean and Japanese) by South Korean boy band Super Junior. The Korean version was released as the lead single off their fifth studio album of the same name digitally on August 2, 2011, via SM Entertainment. In Japan, the single was made available via Avex Trax on December 7, 2011.

"Mr. Simple" became the 85th best-selling single of 2011 in Japan according to the Oricon charts and is certified Gold by the RIAJ for 100,000 units shipped to Japanese music stores. The song was additionally used as a commercial tie-up for Japanese satellite communication holding company SKY Perfect JSAT Group, and as the ending theme song of TBS's Tsubo Musume in January 2012.

== Background ==
The song was released along with the rest of the album's tracks on August 2, 2011, and has topped online charts hours after its release. The song was written by Yoo Young-jin, which was also the writer of their previous lead singles "Twins (Knock Out)", "Don't Don", "Sorry, Sorry" and "Bonamana". SM Entertainment describes the song as:

The title song, 'Mr. Simple', is a 'SJ Funky' song created solely for Super Junior and it can be considered as the final version of 'SJ Funky' following 'Sorry, Sorry' and 'Bonamana' that swept the world. The lyric describes the reality where modern people living in a complicated world failing to achieve what they intended to and losing their love and dreams without the breadth of mind in a simple way with humorous and metaphorical words, meaning "There is no need for taking take everything very seriously. Simple and easy way can rather be a better choice for finding oneself" like the title, 'Mr. Simple.'

=== Japanese release ===
The Japanese version of the song was released as their second Japanese single on December 7, 2011, under Avex Trax. A b-side track of the single entitled "Snow White" was revealed via the group's official Japanese website on November 30, 2011. The single debuted at No. 2 in the Oricon Weekly Charts, selling 89,000 copies on its first week of release, outselling their previous Japanese single "Bijin (Bonamana)" which sold 59,000 on its first week and 67,000 on total sales, making it Super Junior's highest-selling Japanese release yet.

== Commercial performance ==
The single debuted at number three in the Oricon Daily Singles Chart on December 6, 2011, selling 17,000 copies. It plunged down to number six for three days and later peaked at number one by December 10, 2011, the day on which the group's Super Show 4 Osaka leg commenced, selling 36,000 copies, beating AKB48's Ue kara Mariko which sold 23,000 copies, at number two. The latter marks Super Junior's first time to have a release to peak at number one since debut. By the end of 2011, the single was ranked as the 85th best-selling single of 2011 in Japan according to the Oricon charts.

== Music video ==
The music video for the song was released on August 4, 2011, via SM Entertainment's official SMTOWN YouTube page while its Japanese version PV was released November 13, 2011, via Space Shower TV.

== Track listing ==
Japanese single

1. "Mr. Simple" – 3:59
2. "Snow White" – 4:07
3. "Mr. Simple" (Korean ver.) – 3:59
4. "Mr. Simple" (Instrumental) – 3:59 (CD Only)
5. "Snow White" (Instrumental) – 4:07 (CD Only)

CD+DVD Track list

1. "Mr. Simple"
2. "Mr. Simple" (Korean ver.)

CD+DVD limited pressing edition DVD track list

1. "Mr. Simple"
2. "Mr. Simple" (Dance ver.)
3. "Mr. Simple" (Korean ver.)
4. "Mr. Simple" (Korean ver.) [Type B]
5. Off Shot Clip

== Accolades ==
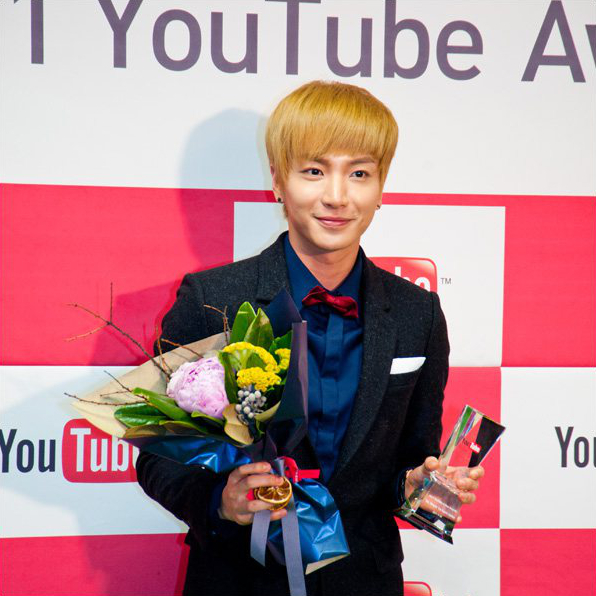
Leeteuk at the 2011 YouTube K-pop Awards

Awards and nominations
Year	Organization	Award	Result	Ref.
2011	Mnet Asian Music Awards	Best Dance Performance (Male)	Nominated	
2011	YouTube K-pop Awards	Most Viewed Video of The Year	Won	
2011	Korea in Motion Festival	Most Popular Music	Won	
2012	Myx Music Awards	Favorite K-Pop Video	Won	
2012	Hito Music Awards	JKpop Song of The Year	Won	

Music program awards
Program	Date
M! Countdown	August 11, 2011
M! Countdown	August 18, 2011
M! Countdown	August 25, 2011
Music Bank	August 12, 2011
Music Bank	August 19, 2011
Music Bank	August 26, 2011
Music Bank	September 2, 2011
Music Bank	September 9, 2011
Inkigayo	August 21, 2011
Inkigayo	August 28, 2011
Inkigayo	September 4, 2011

== Charts ==
=== Weekly charts ===
Chart (2011)	Peak position
Japan (Oricon)	2
South Korea (Gaon)	4
South Korea (K-pop Hot 100)	7

=== Year-end charts ===
Chart (2011)	Position
Japan (Oricon)	85
South Korea (Gaon)	95

== Sales and certifications ==
Region	Certification	Certified units/sales
Japan (RIAJ) Physical single	Gold	100,000^{^}
South Korea (Gaon)	—	1,900,000
^{^} Shipments figures based on certification alone.

== Credits ==
Credits adapted from album's liner notes.

Studio

- SM Booming System – recording, mixing
- Sonic Korea – mastering

Personnel

- SM Entertainment – executive producer
- Lee Soo-man – producer
- Super Junior – vocals, background vocals
- Yoo Young-jin – producer, Korean lyrics, composition, arrangement, vocal directing, background vocals, recording, mixing
- Goro Matsui – Japanese lyrics
- Jeon Hoon – mastering

== Release history ==
Release history for "Mr. Simple"
Region	Date	Version	Format	Label	Ref
Various	August 2, 2011	Korean	Digital download; streaming	SM; KMP	
Japan	December 7, 2011	Japanese	CD; DVD	Avex Trax	
Various	December 7, 2011	Japanese	Digital download; streaming	Avex Trax	
