= One More Time (Otra Vez) =

2018 Super Junior single

- Japanese CD and digital version

Single by Super Junior featuring Reik

from the EP One More Time
- Language: Korean; Spanish; Japanese
- B-side: "Wow! Wow!! Wow!!! (JP); Make You Smile (JP)"
- Released: October 8, 2018; November 28, 2018 (JP)
- Recorded: 2018
- Studio: Doobdoob (Seoul); Seoul
- Genre: Latin pop
- Length: 3:07
- Label: SM; Label SJ; iRiver; Avex Trax (JP)
- Composers: Rudi Daouk; Jakob Mihoubi; Denniz Jamm; Andreas Stone Johansson
- Lyricists: ZNEE; Pablo Preciado; Hideo Toyosaki (JP)
- Producers: Andreas Stone Johansson; Denniz Jamm

Super Junior singles chronology
"Animals" (2018)	"One More Time (Otra Vez)" (2018)	"Show" (2019)

Reik singles chronology
"Amigos Con Derechos" (2018)	"One More Time (Otra Vez)" (2018)	"Ráptame" (2019)

Super Junior Japanese singles chronology
"On and On/Black Suit" (2017)	"One More Time (Otra Vez)" (2018)	"I Think I" (2019)

Music video
- "One More Time (Otra Vez)" on YouTube

"One More Time (Otra Vez)" is a song recorded by South Korean boy band Super Junior featuring Mexican pop rock band Reik, that was released on October 8, 2018, by SM Entertainment and Label SJ, and distributed iRiver for the former's first EP, One More Time.

== Background ==
"One More Time (Otra Vez)" featured the vocals of the seven active Super Junior members — Leeteuk, Yesung, Donghae, Shindong, Eunhyuk, Siwon, and Ryeowook. Heechul did not participate in this release due to health concerns. Kyuhyun was in hiatus due to undergoing his mandatory military service since 2017.

On October 1, 2018, SM Entertainment announced that Super Junior would release a single called "One More Time (Otra Vez)" featuring Mexican pop rock band, Reik. This marked only the second time Super Junior had collaborated with a foreign artist, having done so previously with Leslie Grace for "Lo Siento", months prior.

In an interview with Billboard, both groups expressed their admiration for each other during the song's production. Super Junior's leader Leeteuk stated "Reik was highly recommended by everyone. They were so willing to collaborate, and we would like to express our appreciation to them." Reik's leader, Jesús Alberto Navarro Rosas said "It's very exciting to mix Korean and Latin music because they're having such a huge moment globally, and it's great that this collaboration happened."

On November 28, the song was re-released in Japanese along with four additional tracks, "Wow! Wow!! Wow!!!", and "Make You Smile", and their respective instrumental versions. All three tracks were featured in Super Junior's Japanese compilation album, Star in 2021.

== Composition ==
"One More Time (Otra Vez)" is classified as a Latin pop song with a reggaeton melody.

== Music video ==
The music video featured both groups performing the song in MGM Macau, with Reik's instrumental backing complementing Super Junior's choreography. The video shows an aura of luxury and sensuality as the choreography flows smoothly with the melody.

== Commercial performance ==
The song was performed live in Music Core on October 13, followed by a performance in Inkigayo the following day.

== Track listing ==
Credits adapted from Spotify.

One More Time track listing (Japanese version)
No.	Title	Writer(s)	Length
1.	"One More Time - Otra Vez" ((Featuring Reik) Japanese version)	ZNEE; Rudi Daouk; Pablo Preciado; Jakob Mihoubi; Denniz Jamm; Andreas Stone Johansson	3:05
2.	"Wow! Wow!! Wow!!!"	Christofer Erixon; Josef Lein; MEG.ME	3:21
3.	"Make You Smile"	Jan Andersson; Natsumi Kobayashi; Peter Heden	3:13
4.	"One More Time - Otra Vez" (Instrumental)	ZNEE; Rudi Daouk; Pablo Preciado; Jakob Mihoubi; Denniz Jamm; Andreas Stone Johansson	3:03
5.	"Wow! Wow!! Wow!!!" (Instrumental)	Christofer Erixon; Josef Lein; MEG.ME	3:21
6.	"Make You Smile" (Instrumental)	Jan Andersson; Natsumi Kobayashi; Peter Heden	3:15
Total length:			19:21

== Credits ==
Credits for the song "One More Time (Otra Vez)" is adapted from the EP's liner notes.

Studio

- Doobdoob Studio – recording
- Seoul Studio – recording
- SM Yellow Tail Studio – mixing
- Sterling Sound – mastering

Personnel

- Label SJ – executive producer
- SM Entertainment – executive supervisor
- Lee Soo-man – producer
- Yoo Young-jin – music and sound supervisor
- Super Junior – vocals
- Reik – performer
  - Jesús Navarro – vocals
  - Julio Ramírez – guitar
  - Gilberto "Bibi" Marín – guitar
- ZNEE – Korean lyrics
- Hideo Toyosaki – Japanese lyrics
- Pablo Preciado – Spanish lyrics
- Rudi Daouk – composition
- Jacob Mihoubi – composition
- Andreas Stone Johansson – producer, composition, arrangement, background vocals
- Denniz Jamm – producer, composition, arrangement, background vocals
- Button Pushers – arrangement
- ButterFly – vocal directing
  - Seo Mi-rae – digital editing
- Costa Leon – background vocals
- Ju Chan-yang (Iconic Sounds) – background vocals
- Kim Hyun-gon – recording
- Min Sung-soo – recording
- Jeong Ki-hong – recording
- Koo Jong-pil – mixing
- Chris Gehringer – mastering

== Charts ==
Chart performance for "One More Time (Otra Vez)"
Chart (2018)	Peak position
Japan (Japan Hot 100)	15
South Korea (Kpop Hot 100)	28
US Latin Digital Song Sales (Billboard)	18
US World Digital Songs (Billboard)	4

== Release history ==
Release dates and formats
Region	Date	Format(s)	Version	Distributor	Ref
Various	October 8, 2018	Digital download; streaming	Korean	SM; Label SJ; iRiver	
Japan	November 28, 2018	CD; DVD; Blu-ray	Japanese	Avex Trax	
Various	November 28, 2018	Digital download; streaming	Japanese	Avex Trax	

== See also ==
- List of songs recorded by Super Junior
- Super Junior discography
