= Bonamana =

- Digital and A version cover.

Studio album by Super Junior
- Released: May 13, 2010
- Recorded: 2009–2010
- Studio: BJJ (Seoul); SM Blue Ocean (Seoul); SM Concert Hall (Seoul); SM Booming System (Seoul); SM Yellow Tail (Seoul)
- Genre: K-pop; R&B; dance; electronica
- Length: 42:04 (version A and B); 56:53 (version C)
- Language: Korean
- Label: SM
- Producer: Lee Soo-man

Super Junior chronology
Sorry, Sorry (2009)	Bonamana (2010)	Mr. Simple (2011)

Bonamana second edition cover

Singles from Bonamana
- 1. "Bonamana" Released: May 10, 2010; 2. "No Other" Released: June 25, 2010

Music video
- "Bonamana" on YouTube "No Other" on YouTube

Bonamana (Korean: 미인아; RR: Miina; lit. 'Beauty') is the fourth studio album by South Korean boy band Super Junior. It is the first album with ten out of the original 13 members to take part, also marking the first album not to feature all active members. It was first released as Version A, on May 13, 2010, by SM Entertainment. This was followed by Version B on May 20, which included behind-the-scenes photos from their stage performances and music video shoots. A repackaged version C was released on June 28, with four new tracks including follow-up single "No Other".

The album was listed by Gaon Album Chart as the best-selling release of 2010 in South Korea, with 200,193 copies sold, with the repackaged version at ninth with 99,355 copies. Taken together, these sales made Bonamana the second best-selling album of the year, behind the combined total of 334,785 copies sold of Girls' Generation's Oh! and its repackage.

== Recording and production ==
The group first announced that they were working on their fourth full-length studio album in January 2010 while presenting an award at Thailand's KPN Awards. A week later, Kibum, who participated very little in the group's third studio album Sorry, Sorry due to acting pursuits, discussed the possibility of participating in the production of Bonamana during an interview. After a thorough discussion with producers, Kibum decided to continue his acting career instead. With Kangin fulfilling his two-year mandatory military service and Han Geng's lawsuit against SM Entertainment, only ten members were able to work on the album.

Shindong tweeted about preparing for the fourth album in early April. On April 19, SM Entertainment formally announced through online media outlets about the release and production of the album. After Super Junior finished their Super Show 2 Asia concert tour in the Philippines, the members postponed solo activities to fit more time on working in the album in time for a mid-May release.

== Composition ==
Super Junior consistently described the main concept style of Bonamana to be "mature" and "sophisticated". Following the music genre that they settled for in Sorry, Sorry, the music in Bonamana is largely mainstream and is composed of a variety of genres including R&B ballads, pop dances, and hip hop. However, unlike Sorry, Sorry, a majority of Bonamana maintains a handful of cheerful, medium-tempo pop songs that Super Junior had been known for performing since debut.

The album contains 11 tracks with title track "Bonamana", an upbeat electropop song. SM described that "Bonamana" is the "completion of the SJ Funky genre", a genre that Super Junior will pursue continuously since its development in Sorry, Sorry. Eunhyuk created the dance choreography for "Boom Boom," hip hop dance track characterized for its "dark and powerful groove." Super Junior invites Park Chang-hyun a fourth time to write the soft vocal ballad "Coagulation", performed by Super Junior-K.R.Y. Similar to "Coagulation" is "One Fine Spring Day", a solo song by Ryeowook. The fourth track, "Your Eyes" is described as a "regular Super Junior R&B ballad", with emphasized characterization on the differences between Yesung's and Kyuhyun's voices. Surprisingly, on the seventh track "Shake It Up," Han Geng who was currently in a lawsuit with SM Entertainment, did not have his vocals scratched out on the track. It was revealed later by the representative of SM Entertainment that this song was recorded before Han Geng filed the lawsuit. The album ends with the cheerful electropop song "Here We Go" that will "[refresh] the listeners' hearings."

For the repackaged album, Bonamana Version C, there are four new songs. The first one, "No Other," received great feedback, so it was followed up with a music video released on July 7, 2010. The next song, "All My Heart" is written by Leeteuk and Henry Lau, is an acoustic guitar ballad. The other Super Junior member, Eunhyuk and Donghae also wrote and compose the song "A Short Journey" as a tribute for fellow member Kangin who was serving in the military. This song is performed mainly by Kangin, accompanied by Donghae, Yesung, Kyuhyun, and Ryeowook.

=== Singles ===
Like most of Super Junior's past lead singles, the first track was announced on May 6, 2010, as title track "Bonamana". A music video teaser, was released on May 7, with a brief and blurred preview of the song's chorus, and available for digital download from May 10. The full MV was released on May 12. Naming the genre as "SJ Funky" (Super Junior Funky), "Bonamana" consists of "African rhythms, with catchy grooves and club house beats." The song is widely defined to be in an electropop funk style, and a majority of the song is concentrated on vocals. It won multiple music program awards.

The follow-up single "No Other", digitally released on June 25, is a dance-pop track. It was produced by New York-based producers Reefa, Denzil (DR) Remedios, Kibwe (12Keyz) Luke and Ryan Jhun, who have worked with other hip-hop artists such as Fabolous, Ludacris and The Game.

== Reception ==
=== Critical reception ===
Music critic So Seung-geun from IZM gave the album 2 stars out of 5, criticizing the group's vocals and overuse of autotune, as well as the "unnatural" incorporation of English lyrics in the title track "Bonamana". So additionally referred to "Bonamana" as a "recycled" version of "Sorry, Sorry".

=== Commercial performance ===
Over 200,000 copies were pre-ordered a week after the release date was announced, setting a new high record for the group. According to South Korea's Hanteo chart, version A of Bonamana, debuted at #1 on the charts, selling over 36,000 copies on the first day of release, making it the biggest opening day of the group's career. After four more days of release, over 70,000 copies were sold. Bonamana charted at #1 again on real time and daily charts after the release of version B, selling over 13,000 copies, totaling the offline sales to over 100,000.

The album peaked at number one on the Gaon Weekly Album Chart for the week of May 9 to 15, 2010 and also number one for May and June on the Gaon Monthly Album Chart. In February 2011, according to Gaon Chart's 2010 year-end summation chart, the album's A and B versions sold a cumulative total of 200,193 copies, awarding the album as the "best selling album of 2010". Meanwhile, the repackaged album sold 99,355 copies, ranking at the ninth spot in the same chart, bringing to a total of almost 300,000 units sold in South Korea. While in Taiwan, the album sold a cumulative total of 57,000 copies. In the Philippines, the album reached gold status after a week released on May 4 selling 7,500 copies.

== Promotion and live performances ==
Super Junior's first comeback performance was on May 14 with the performance of "Boom Boom" and "Bonamana" on KBS2TV's Music Bank,. The group performed again with the roster the following weekend on MBC's Show! Music Core on May 15 and on SBS's The Music Trend on May 16.

=== Super Show 3 ===
Super Show 3 is Super Junior's third Asia-wide concert tour; it commenced with two shows in Seoul in August 2010 and continued onto China, Taiwan, Japan and other Asian countries, with a total of 20 concerts in 13 cities. On February 24, 2011, a 3D film of the Seoul concert was released in 16 CJ CGV cinemas. In October 2011, a live album of the concert held in Seoul was released.

The following setlist is performed at the show in Bangkok on January 15 and 16, 2011. It is not intended to represent all shows throughout the tour.

1. "Sorry, Sorry"
2. "Super Girl"
3. "Don't Don"
4. "No Other"
5. "Rokkugo"
6. "One Fine Spring Day" (Ryeowook solo)
7. "New Endless Love" (Kyuhyun solo)
8. "Looking for the Day" (Siwon solo)
9. "I Wanna Love You" (Eunhyuk and Donghae duet)
10. "Baby" (Henry solo)
11. "Tok Tok Tok"
12. "You and I"
13. "Poker Face" (Heechul solo)
14. "Single Ladies" + "Crazy in Love"
15. "Lascia Ch'io Pianga"
16. "Bonamana"
17. "A Man in Love"
18. "U"
19. "Dancing Out"
20. "Cooking? Cooking!"
21. "Way For Love"
22. "You Are The One"
23. "Wonder Boy"

Tour dates
Date	City	Country	Venue	Attendance
August 14, 2010	Seoul	South Korea	Olympic Gymnastics Arena	20,000
August 15, 2010	Seoul	South Korea	Olympic Gymnastics Arena	20,000
August 28, 2010	Qingdao	China	Guoxin Gymnasium	—
October 23, 2010	Beijing	China	Capital Indoor Stadium	—
November 13, 2010	Nanjing	China	Nanjing Olympic Sports Center Gymnasium	—
December 25, 2010	Guangzhou	China	Yuexiushan Stadium	—
January 15, 2011	Bangkok	Thailand	Impact Arena	—
January 16, 2011	Bangkok	Thailand	Impact Arena	—
January 29, 2011	Singapore		Singapore Indoor Stadium	20,000
January 30, 2011	Singapore		Singapore Indoor Stadium	20,000
February 18, 2011	Yokohama	Japan	Yokohama Arena	36,000
February 19, 2011	Yokohama	Japan	Yokohama Arena	36,000
February 20, 2011	Yokohama	Japan	Yokohama Arena	36,000
February 26, 2011	Quezon City	Philippines	Araneta Coliseum	—
March 5, 2011	Shanghai	China	Mercedes-Benz Arena	—
March 11, 2011	Taipei	Taiwan	Taipei Arena	30,000
March 12, 2011	Taipei	Taiwan	Taipei Arena	30,000
March 13, 2011	Taipei	Taiwan	Taipei Arena	30,000
March 19, 2011	Kuala Lumpur	Malaysia	Putra Indoor Stadium	—
May 7, 2011	Thủ Dầu Một (Note: The city is labelled as Ho Chi Minh City on promotional materials and in media.)	Vietnam	Gò Đậu Stadium	9,000
Total				N/A

== Track listing ==
Bonamana Version A and B track listing
No.	Title	Lyrics	Music	Arrangement	Length
1.	"Bonamana" (미인아; Miina; 'Beauty')	Yoo Young-jin	Yoo Young-jin	Yoo Young-jin	3:58
2.	"Boom Boom" (나쁜 여자; Nappeun yeoja; 'Bad Girl')	Kenzie; Eunhyuk	Kenzie; Hayden Bell; Wayne Beckford; Ray Lavender	Kenzie	3:15
3.	"Coagulation" (응결; Eunggyeol; 'Condensation') (performed by Super Junior-K.R.Y.)	Park Chang-hyun	Park Chang-hyun	Park Chang-hyun	4:20
4.	"Your Eyes" (나란 사람; Naran saram; 'Someone Like Me') (duet performed by Yesung and Kyuhyun)	Kim Jeong-bae	Kenzie	Kenzie	3:41
5.	"My Only Girl"	Hong Ji-yoo	Kenzie; Brandon Fraley; Joshua Welton	Yoo Han-jin	3:09
6.	"My All Is In You" (사랑이 이렇게; Sarangi ireoke; 'Love Like This')	Kwon Yoon-jung	Luther "Squeak" Jackson; Stephen Beckham	Tesung Kim (Iconic Sound); Noday	3:36
7.	"Shake It Up!"	Young-hu Kim; Eunhyuk	Ryan S. Jhun; Antwann Frost; Ronald Frost; Micheal Muncie; iDR (C2); 12Keyz (C2)	Ryan S. Jhun; C2	3:02
8.	"In My Dreams" (잠들고 싶어; Jamdeulgo sipeo; 'Want To Go To Sleep') (performed by Yesung, Sungmin, Donghae, Ryeowook and Kyuhyun)	Kwon Yoon-jung	Kim Ji-hoo	Kenzie	5:02
9.	"One Fine Spring Day" (봄날; Bomnal; 'Spring Day') (solo performed by Ryeowook)	Kwon Yoon-jung	Magnus Andersson	Magnus Andersson	3:56
10.	"Good Person" (좋은 사람; Joeun saram)	You Hee-yeol	You Hee-yeol	Kenzie	4:04
11.	"Here We Go"	Kim Eana; Eunhyuk	Carl Utbult; Tebey Ottoh; Fredrik Hult (Firefly)	G-High (Monotree); Lee Joo-hyoung (MonoTree); Hwang Seong-je	3:50
Total length:					41:53

Bonamana Repackage track listing
No.	Title	Lyrics	Music	Arrangement	Length
1.	"Bonamana" (미인아)	Yoo Young-jin	Yoo Young-jin	Yoo Young-jin	3:58
2.	"No Other" (너 같은 사람 또 없어; Neo gateun saram tto eopseo; 'There's No Other Person Like You')	Kenzie	iDR (C2); 12Keyz (C2); Ryan S. Jhun; Reefa	C2; Ryan S. Jhun; Reefa; Tesung Kim (Iconic Sound)	4:16
3.	"Shake It Up!" (Remix)	Young-hu Kim; Eunhyuk	Ryan S. Jhun; Antwann Frost; Ronald Frost; Micheal Muncie; iDR (C2); 12Keyz (C2)	Ryan S. Jhun; C2	3:04
4.	"All My Heart" (진심; Jinsim; 'Sincerity')	Hong Ji-yoo	Henry; Leeteuk	Tesung Kim (Iconic Sound); Noday	3:41
5.	"A Short Journey" (여행; Yeohaeng; 'Travel')	Eunhyuk; Donghae	Super Junior-D&E	Tesung Kim (Iconic Sound); Noday; Kim Eun-young	3:44
6.	"Boom Boom" (나쁜 여자)	Kenzie; Eunhyuk	Kenzie; Hayden Bell; Wayne Beckford; Ray Lavender	Kenzie	3:15
7.	"Coagulation" (응결) (performed by Super Junior-K.R.Y.)	Park Chang-hyun	Park Chang-hyun	Park Chang-hyun	4:20
8.	"Your Eyes" (나란 사람) (duet performed by Yesung and Kyuhyun)	Kim Jeong-bae	Kenzie	Kenzie	3:41
9.	"My Only Girl"	Hong Ji-yoo	Kenzie; Brandon Fraley; Joshua Welton	Yoo Han-jin	3:09
10.	"My All Is In You" (사랑이 이렇게)	Kwon Yoon-jung	Luther "Squeak" Jackson; Stephen Beckham	Tesung Kim (Iconic Sound); Noday	3:36
11.	"Shake It Up!"	Young-hu Kim; Eunhyuk	Ryan S. Jhun; Antwann Frost; Ronald Frost; Micheal Muncie; iDR (C2); 12Keyz (C2)	Ryan S. Jhun; C2	3:02
12.	"In My Dreams" (잠들고 싶어) (performed by Yesung, Sungmin, Donghae, Ryeowook and Kyuhyun)	Kwon Yoon-jung	Kim Ji-hoo	Kenzie	5:02
13.	"One Fine Spring Day" (봄날) (solo performed by Ryeowook)	Kwon Yoon-jung	Magnus Andersson	Magnus Andersson	3:56
14.	"Good Person" (좋은 사람)	You Hee-yeol	You Hee-yeol	Kenzie	4:04
15.	"Here We Go"	Kim Eana; Eunhyuk	Carl Utbult; Tebey Ottoh; Fredrik Hult (Firefly)	G-High (Monotree); Lee Joo-hyoung (MonoTree); Hwang Seong-je	3:50
Total length:					56:38

Version D (asian special edition) DVD
No.	Title	Length
1.	""Bonamana" MV"
2.	""Bonamana" MV making-of"
3.	""No Other" MV"
4.	""No Other" MV making-of"

== Charts ==
=== Weekly charts ===
Chart (2010)	Peak position
Japanese Albums (Oricon)	15
South Korean Albums (Gaon)	1
US World Albums (Billboard)	7

=== Monthly charts ===
Chart (May 2010)	Peak position
South Korean Albums (Gaon)	1

=== Yearly charts ===
Chart (2010)	Position
South Korean Albums (Gaon)	1

== Sales and certifications ==
Region	Certification	Certified units/sales
Philippines (PARI)	Gold	7,500^{*}
South Korea (Gaon)	—	216,518
South Korea (Gaon) No Other repackage	—	111,940
Taiwan	—	57,000
^{*} Sales figures based on certification alone.

== Accolades ==
Awards and nominations for Bonamana
Year	Award	Category	Result	Ref.
2010	Golden Disc Awards	Disk Bonsang	Won	
2010	Golden Disc Awards	Disk Daesang	Nominated	
2010	Hanteo Awards	Album Award	Won	
2010	Mnet Asian Music Awards	Album of the Year	Nominated	
2011	Gaon Chart Awards	Top Selling Album of 2010	Won	
2011	Global Chinese Golden Chart Awards	Best Japanese & Korean Album	Won	

== Release history ==
Version	Region	Date	Distributing label	Format
A	South Korea	May 13, 2010	SM Entertainment	CD
A	Hong Kong	June 4, 2010	Avex Asia	CD
A	Taiwan	June 18, 2010	Avex Taiwan	CD
A	Philippines	July 3, 2010 (Special Release); July 9, 2010 (Official Release)	Universal Records	CD
B	South Korea	May 20, 2010	SM Entertainment	CD
B	Hong Kong	June 4, 2010	Avex Asia	CD
B	Taiwan	June 25, 2010	Avex Taiwan	CD
B	Philippines	July 3, 2010 (Special Release); July 9, 2010 (Official Release)	Universal Records	CD
C (Repackaged)	South Korea	June 28, 2010	SM Entertainment	CD
C (Repackaged)	Hong Kong	July 3, 2010	Avex Asia	CD
C (Repackaged)	Taiwan	July 23, 2010	Avex Taiwan	CD
C (Repackaged)	Philippines	August 28, 2010 (Special Release); September 3, 2010 (Official Release)	Universal Records	CD
--	Japan	July 21, 2010	Avex Trax, Rhythm Zone	CD
D (Asia Special Edition)	Taiwan	November 19, 2010	Avex Taiwan	CD+DVD

== See also ==
- Bonamana
  - Bonamana (Music Video) on YouTube
  - Bonamana (Teaser) on YouTube
  - Bonamana (Making Film 1) on YouTube
  - Bonamana (Making Film 2) on YouTube
- No Other
  - No Other (Music Video) on YouTube
