= No Other (song) =

Single by Super Junior

from the album Bonamana (repackaged)
- Language: Korean
- Released: June 25, 2010
- Recorded: 2009
- Studio: SM Yellow Tail (Seoul)
- Genre: Korean hip hop; Dance-pop
- Length: 4:16
- Label: SM
- Composers: C-2; Ryan S. Jhun; Reefa
- Lyricist: Kenzie
- Producers: C-2; Ryan S. Jhun; Reefa

Super Junior singles chronology
"Bonamana" (2010)	"No Other" (2010)	"Knock Knock Knock" (2010)

Music video
- "No Other" on YouTube

"No Other" (너 같은 사람 또 없어; Neo gateun saram tto eopseo; 'There's no other person like you') is a song recorded by South Korean boy band Super Junior that was released on June 25, 2010, by SM Entertainment as a single for the repackage edition of their fourth studio album, Bonamana.

== Background ==
"No Other" was first announced on June 22, 2010, by SM Entertainment as the follow-up single to "Bonamana" and would be selected as the lead single of the repackage edition of the album with the same name as the former single, scheduled to be released on June 25. The track was released digitally on music streaming services such as Melon and Cyworld on June 25 as a pre-release single.

== Composition ==
"No Other" is described as a Korean hip hop and a dance-pop song with beats based on Southern hip hop and a major synth riff. It features the vocals of ten active members — Leeteuk, Heechul, Yesung, Sungmin, Shindong, Eunhyuk, Donghae, Ryeowook, and Kyuhyun. Kangin did not participate in the production for the album (save from "A Short Journey") due to the postponement of his future activities caused by a DUI hit-and-run from October 2009. Han Geng departed the group after he filed a lawsuit against SM Entertainment and Kibum opted to focus on his acting career instead.

The song was written by SM's resident songwriter, Kenzie, the melody was composed by New York-based composers such as Reefa, C-2, and Ryan S. Jhun, who were producers for hip-hop artists such as Fabolous and Ludacris. The lyrics narrates feelings for a lover in a straightforward way.

== Music video ==
The music video for the song was released on July 7. By August 2020, the video has garnered more than 100 million views and becoming the fourth Super Junior song to achieve the feat. Member Eunhyuk expressed his gratitude for the fans via his Instagram upon hearing the news.

== Live performances ==
The song was part of Super Junior's third Asia concert, Super Show 3, and their fifth Asia concert Super Show 8: Infinite Time.

== Credits and personnel ==
Credits adapted from the album's liner notes.

Studio

- SM Yellow Tail Studio – recording, mixing
- SM Blue Ocean Studio – recording
- Sonic Korea – mastering

Personnel

- SM Entertainment – executive producer
- Super Junior – vocals
  - Eunhyuk – lyrics
- Kenzie – lyrics, vocal directing, recording
- C-2 – producer, composition, arrangement
- Ryan S. Jhun – producer, composition, arrangement
- Reefa – producer, composition, arrangement
- Tesung Kim – arrangement
- Koo Jong-pil – recording, mixing
- Lee Seong-ho – recording
- Jeon Hoon – mastering

== Charts ==
Chart performance for "No Other"
Chart (2010)	Peak position
South Korea (Gaon)	20
US World Digital Song Sales (Billboard)	5

== Release history ==
Release history for "No Other"
Region	Date	Format	Label
Various	June 25, 2010	Digital download; streaming	SM
