= Bonamana (song) =

2010 single by Super Junior

- Japanese CD single+DVD cover

Single by Super Junior

from the album Bonamana
- Language: Korean; Japanese
- Released: May 10, 2010; June 8, 2011 (JP)
- Studio: SM Booming System (Seoul)
- Genre: House
- Length: 3:59
- Label: SM; Avex Trax
- Composer: Yoo Young-jin
- Lyricists: Yoo Young-jin; Goro Matsui (JP)
- Producer: Yoo Young-jin

Super Junior singles chronology
"It's You" (2009)	"Bonamana" (2010)	"No Other" (2010)

Music video
- "Bonamana (Korean)" on YouTube

"Bonamana" (미인아; Miina; 'Beauty') is a song performed by South Korean boy band Super Junior. It is the lead single from the group's fourth studio album, Bonamana. The song was released as a digital single on May 10, 2010, three days before the South Korean release of Bonamana. The song was composed and arranged by Yoo Young-jin, who also penned the lyrics.

== Background ==
Made in the style "SJ Funky", which Super Junior had been exploring since the release of their third studio album, Sorry, Sorry, "Bonamana" draws influences from American electronica, funk and hip hop, incorporating African rhythms and club house beats into the melody, similar to the song's writer Yoo Young-jin, who later displayed the same style in Super Junior-M's "Super Girl" and Shinee's "Ring Ding Dong". The song incorporates the Afro tom, an African percussive instrument, and the riff of a Jupiter synth, a sound synthesizer. Vocals are also autotuned. The song is about the sincerity of a man who is trying to win a girl's love, with the lyrics having been described as witty and humorous.

== Japanese release ==
On April 25, 2011, it was announced that the single would be re-released in a Japanese version through the Japanese convenience store chain Circle K Sunkus. The song was released as a digital download on May 18, 2011, followed by a physical release on June 8, 2011, making it their first official Japanese single. An upcoming CM (commercial movie) for the tie-up was filmed in February 2011, with the Japanese lyrics recorded a month after, in March 2011. The single debuted at number two on the Oricon chart on its day of release. According to the Oricon Chart, Bonamana (美人) sold 27,168 units on its release day. In addition, the music video, which consists of videos from the Super Junior 3rd Asia Tour Super Show 3 in Japan held at Yokohama Arena in February, received over 300,000 views on the Japanese UCC website Nikoniko in a day.

== Promotion and reception ==
On May 6, 2010, "Bonamana" was announced to be the lead single from the group's fourth album. The full single was released via digital download on South Korean MP3 download sites on May 10. The song was first performed on KBS2TV's music show Music Bank on May 14, and their performance peaked at number 3 on Nate's top trending search. The group performed "Bonamana" on MBC's Show! Music Core on May 15 and on SBS's The Music Trend on May 16. After only one week in the charts, "Bonamana" surged to number 1 on Music Bank's K-Chart, making it Super Junior's fastest rise to the top of the chart for a lead single.

== Music video ==
The choreography in the first hook is inspired by Kim Yuna's "Danse Macabre" performance.

Directed by Jang Jae-hyuk, the music video was filmed in a filming set in Namyangju, Gyeonggi in late April 2010. The video is fairly low budget and was entirely shot in a disoriented sepia color, with shadows and alternating brighter lights shining on the members, consistently changing the lighting of the video. The video first begins with different angle shots of each member standing and slowly spinning around in a dark background with alternating backlighting, and then proceeds to a lighter tone when the song begins. A majority of the music video focuses on showing the group's various hip-hop dance formations and techniques. The choreography of the dance is inspired by speed skating, and the dance steps during the first hook of the song is inspired by Kim Yuna's "Danse Macabre" performance. Also, in the music video, there is a dance break performed by all members.

A minute-long teaser of the music video was revealed on May 7 through YouTube, and the full music video premiered on May 12 on Korea's GOMTV video site and through SM Entertainment's official YouTube account, attracting over 600,000 views on the first day of release. It currently has over 160 million views.

== Accolades ==
Music program awards
Program	Date	Ref.
Music Bank	May 21, 2010	
Music Bank	May 28, 2010	
Music Bank	June 4, 2010	
Inkigayo	May 30, 2010	
Inkigayo	June 6, 2010	
Inkigayo	June 13, 2010	

== Credits ==
Credits adapted from album's liner notes.

Studio

- SM Booming System – recording, mixing
- Sonic Korea – mastering

Personnel

- SM Entertainment – executive producer
- Lee Soo-man – producer
- Super Junior – vocals, background vocals
- Yoo Young-jin – producer, Korean lyrics, composition, arrangement, vocal directing, background vocals, recording, mixing
- Goro Matsui – Japanese lyrics
- Jeon Hoon – mastering

== Charts ==
=== Korean version ===
Chart (2010)	Peak position
South Korea (Gaon)	8
US World Digital Songs (Billboard)	18

=== Japanese version ===
Chart	Peak position	Reported sales
Japan Daily Singles (Oricon)	2	69,875
Japan Weekly Singles (Oricon)	2	69,875
Japan Monthly Singles (Oricon)	10	69,875
Japan Yearly Singles (Oricon)	110	69,875

== Release history ==
Release history for "Bonamana"
Region	Date	Version	Format	Label	Ref
Various	May 10, 2010	Korean	Digital download; streaming	SM	
Japan	May 18, 2011	Japanese	Digital download; streaming	Avex Trax	
Japan	June 8, 2011	Japanese	CD; DVD	Avex Trax	
