= List of Leeteuk performances =

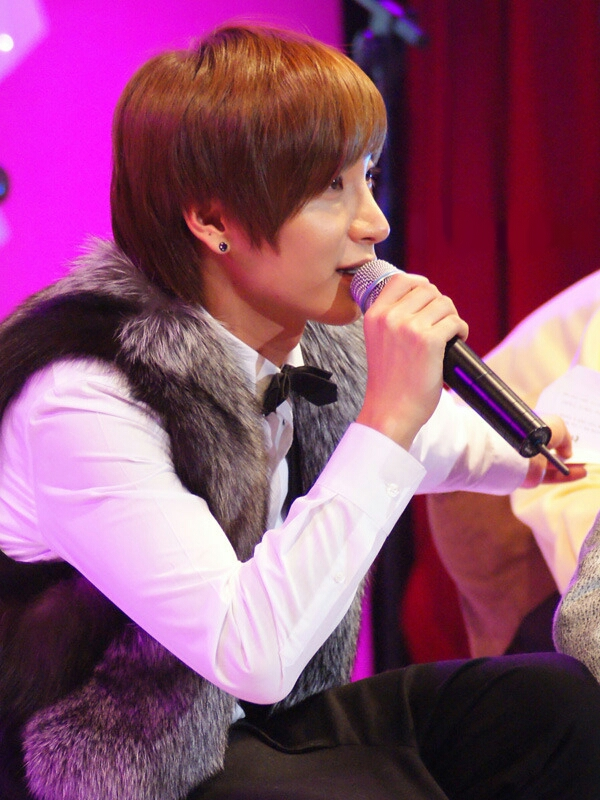
Leeteuk during Kiss The Radio public broadcast in 2009

Leeteuk is a South Korean singer-songwriter and television host. He is the leader of the K-pop boy band Super Junior and its subgroups, Super Junior-T, Super Junior-Happy, and Super Junior-L.S.S. He has hosted numerous television programs and award shows, and acted in several films and television dramas in cameo or supporting roles. He made his television debut with a bit part appearance in the drama All About Eve in 2000. He has since acted in Dream High (2011), All My Love For You (2011), My Bittersweet Life (2011), Salamander Guru and The Shadows (2012), Persevere, Goo Hae Ra (2015), Borg Mom (2017), Secret Queen Makers (2018) and Work Later, Drink Now (2021).

After debuting with the boy band Super Junior in 2005, he participated in several Super Junior–centric television shows; Super Junior Show (2005–2006), Super Adonis Camp (2006), Super Junior Mini-Drama (2006), and television dramas; Mystery 6 (2006) and Super Junior Unbelievable Story (2008). He made his film debut by acting in Attack on the Pin-Up Boys (2007) which featured all members of the boy band except Kyuhyun who was injured. He participated in the concert documentary films I Am (2012) and SM Town The Stage (2015), which were screened in selected cinemas. He became a radio DJ through the radio programs Leeteuk's Music Show which aired on TBS in 2006 and Super Junior Kiss the Radio (Sukira) which was aired on KBS Cool FM from 2006 until 2011, and for a few months in 2016.

He started his career as a host in the weekly music show M! Countdown from 2005 until 2008. He rose to prominence after co-hosting Strong Heart from 2009 until 2012, which led him to win the Best Newcomer Award in the variety show category at the 3rd SBS Entertainment Awards. He also hosted Star King (2011–2012) and participated in the third season of the reality show We Got Married (2012) until he enlisted in the military in October 2012 as an active duty soldier. While in the military, he participated in the musical theater The Promise, which was produced by the Ministry of National Defense to commemorate the 60th anniversary of the Korean War armistice. He won the Newcomer Award at the 7th Daegu International Musical Festival for his role as Miss Kim in the musical. He was also chosen to host the 2013 Military Service Award, an annual award ceremony to honour military personnel, during his enlistment.

After he was discharged from the military in 2014, he hosted the biannual celebrity sports competition, Idol Star Athletics Championships. He has hosted the program nine times; twice in 2015, 2018 and 2019, and once in 2016, 2020 and 2021. He started hosting I Can See Your Voice in 2015, which has since grown into a global television franchise and was adapted in other regions and languages. He is also the host of the longest-running South Korean cooking show The Best Cooking Secrets from 2017 until 2020, which airs on the educational channel EBS. Besides television works, he frequently hosts South Korean awards ceremony such as the Golden Disc Awards (2012, 2015 and 2016), Circle Chart Music Awards (Note: Known as Gaon Chart Music Awards before 2023) (2015–2018, 2020–2021, and 2024), and Asia Artist Awards (2016–2021). He has hosted multiple concert events such as the Asia Song Festival (2014–2018), Dream Concert (2015–2017, 2019–2021, and 2024), and 2018 Winter Olympics promotional concerts; K-Drama Festa in Pyeongchang (2017) and Dream Concert in Pyeongchang (2017).

== Films ==
Film performances
Year	Title	Role	Ref.
2007	Attack on the Pin-Up Boys	School panda mascot	
2010	Super Show 3 3D	Himself	
2012	I AM.	Himself	
2013	Super Show 4 3D	Himself	
2015	SM Town The Stage	Himself	
2025	Lee Soo Man: King of K-Pop	Himself	

== Television shows ==
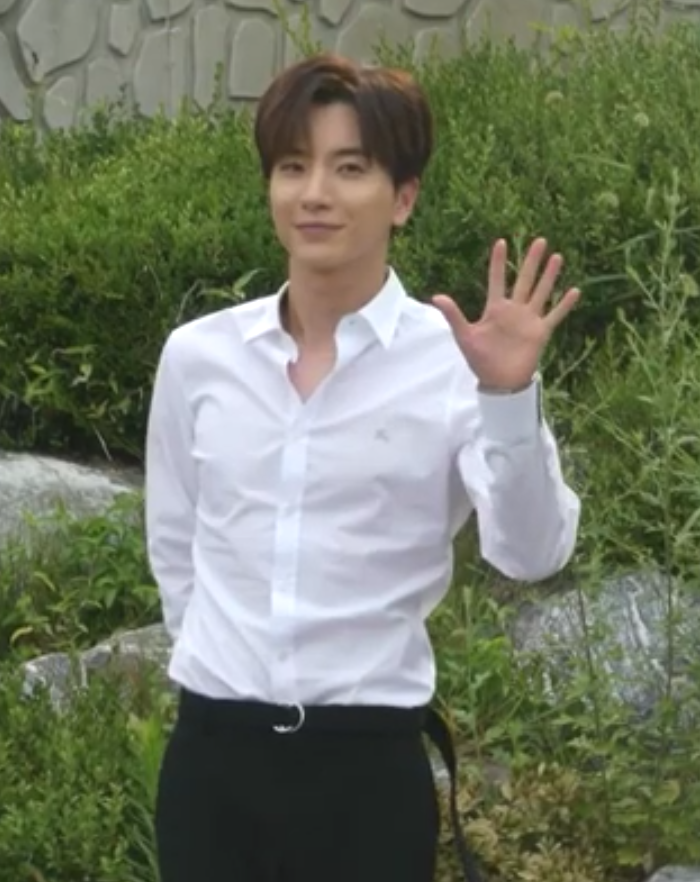
Leeteuk at the 2018 Idol Star Athletics Championships

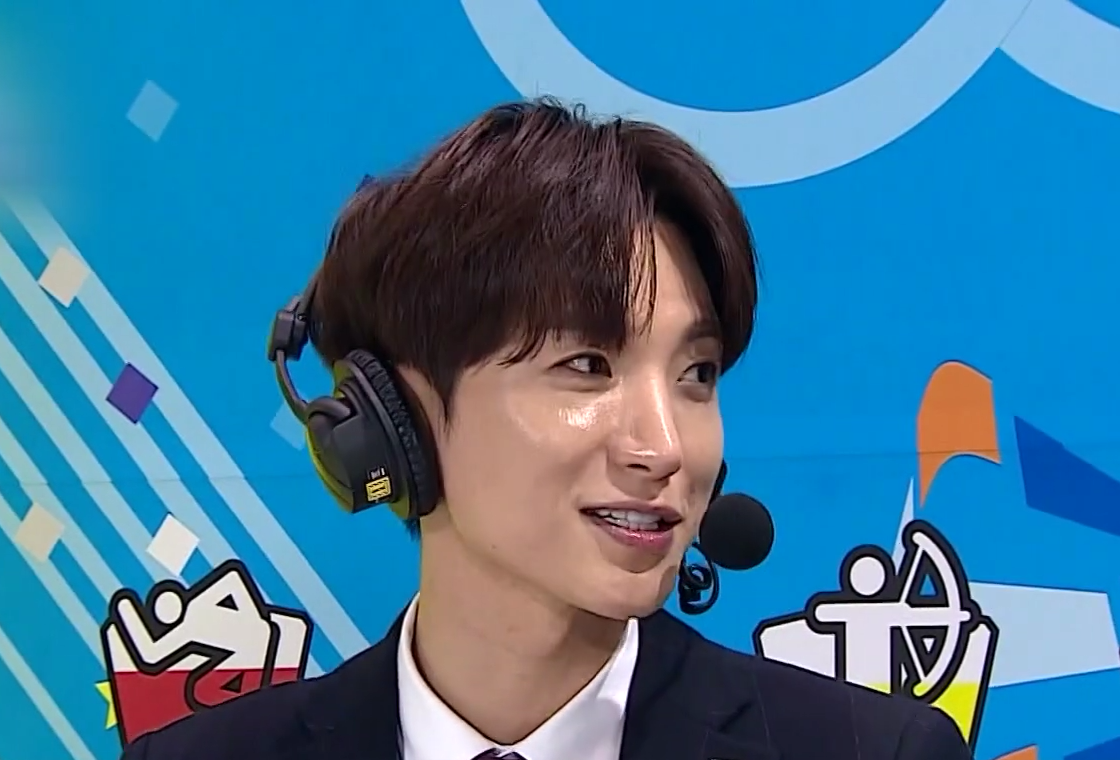
Leeteuk at the 2019 Idol Star Lunar New Year Athletics Championships

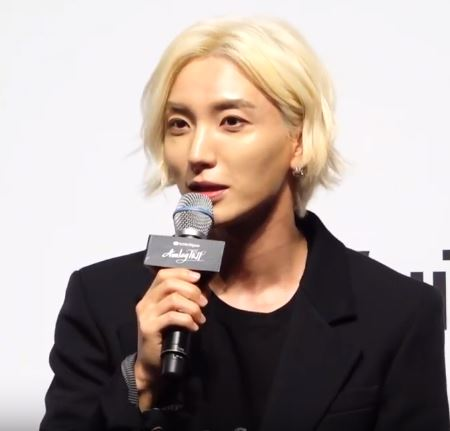
Leeteuk during Analog Trip press conference in 2019

Key
‡	Current programs
†	Works that have not yet been aired

Television performances
Year	Title	Role	Note	Ref.
2000	All About Eve	Moviegoer	Bit part appearance, credited as Park Jeong-su	
2005–2006	Super Junior Show	Himself	With the other members of Super Junior 05	
2005–2008	M! Countdown	Host	Alongside Shindong, Kangin (2005–2007), and Eunhyuk (2007–2008）	
2006	Mystery 6	Himself	A horror mockumentary in which the cast investigated the death of the former tenant of Super Junior's apartment	
2006	Super Adonis Camp	Himself	With Super Junior members	
2006	Princess Diary	Himself	Final episode, appeared with Super Junior	
2006	Full House	Himself	With Super Junior	
2006	Super Junior Mini-Drama	Various roles	With Super Junior	
2007–2008	Explorers of the Human Body	Himself	With Super Junior	
2007–2008	Leeteuk's Love Fighter	Host		
2008	The Comedy Bootcamp	Himself	Season 3, along with Super Junior members	
2008	Super Junior Unbelievable Story	Leeteuk	A 25-minute one-act drama, a part of MBC's Triple Drama slot	
2008	You Can Fly	Host	Episode 1	
2008	Bachelor While on a Date	Host		
2008	Idol Show	Host	Season 1, with members of Super Junior-H	
2008–2009	Road Show Quiz Expedition	Host		
2008–2010, 2014	Inkigayo	Host	Episodes 512–515, special host with Eun Ji-won and Han Seung-yeon; Episode 563 Winter Olympic special, with Heechul and Shindong; Episode 783, with Heechul and Lee Yu-bi	
2009	Challenge! Good Song	Host		
2009	Introducing a Star's Friend Survival	Himself		
2009	Human Network Miracle	Host		
2009	Lord of the Rings	Host		
2009	Challenge! Golden Ladder	Host		
2009–2010	Oh! Brothers	Host		
2009–2012	Strong Heart	Host		
2010	Waving the Taegukgi	Host	A special program to support and cheer for South Korea at the 2010 FIFA World Cup in South Africa	
2010	Love Chaser	Host		
2010–2011	Enjoy Today	Himself		
2010–2011	Super Junior's Foresight	Host		
2011	Dream High	Radio DJ Lee	Cameo appearance in episode 13	
2011	Fifty Million Questions	Host		
2011	All My Love For You	Blind date partner	Cameo appearance in episode 144	
2011	Sistar & LeeTeuk's Hello Baby	Himself		
2011	Strongest Couple	Host		
2011	My Bittersweet Life	Pedestrian	Appeared as an extra in episode 110	
2011–2012, 2016	We Got Married	Himself / Host	Partnered with Kang So-ra in season 3, in episodes 104–132; and appeared for two episodes in season 4 in episodes 133 and 134 Host on episode 338 (Chuseok special episode) in season 4, along with Park Mi-sun	
2011–2012, 2015–2016	Star King	Host		
2012	Salamander Guru and The Shadows	Television host	Cameo appearance in episode 4	
2012	Jewellery House	Host	Episodes 2–4	
2012, 2017	Saturday Night Live Korea	Host / Various roles	Host with Super Junior for two episodes; season 2 episode 12, and season 9 episode 32	
2014–2015	Super Junior One Fine Day	Himself	A travel show shot in Switzerland, with Eunhyuk and Donghae	
2015	Persevere, Goo Hae Ra	Leeteuk	Cameo appearance as a music show host in episode 5	
2015	2015 Idol Star Athletics Basketball Futsal Archery Championships	Host		
2015	Match Made in Heaven Returns	Host		
2015	Music Bank	Host	Episode 782, filling in for the regular host, Park Seo-joon	
2015	White Swan	Host		
2015	The Mickey Mouse Club	Host		
2015	Super Junior Devil's Feast	Himself	With Super Junior members	
2015	2015 Idol Star Athletics Ssireum Basketball Futsal Archery Championships	Host		
2015	The Friends in Switzerland	Himself	A travel show shot in Switzerland with Ryeowook	
2015–2023	I Can See Your Voice	Host	Season 1–10	
2016	2016 Idol Star Athletics Ssireum Futsal Archery Championships	Host		
2016	Hidden Camera Shot Battle	Host		
2016	The Birth of a Song	Host		
2016	27th Korean Children Song Contest	Host		
2016	Reform Show	Host		
2016	Law of the Jungle	Himself	Episodes 216–219 (Law of The Jungle in Papua New Guinea)	
2016	Star Show 360	Host		
2016	Super Junior Leeteuk no Hitori Tabi in Japan	Host	Japanese travel show	
2016	Talk Hero	Senior host		
2016–2017	Lucky Race	Himself		
2016–2017	Idol Party	Host		
2016–2018	Please Take Care of My Vanity	Host	Season 2 and 3	
2016, 2020, 2021	Weekly Idol	Host	Episodes 234 and 235, filling in for the regular host, Jeong Hyeong-don Episodes 475 and 533, filling in for Eunhyuk	
2017	Singderella	Host	Episode 10, filling in for the regular host, Lee Soo-geun	
2017	Missing 9	Host	Host for the special commentary episode, "Missing 9 The Beginning" with Lee Soo-geun	
2017	Girl Group Battle	Host		
2017	Sixth Sense Hit Show 1/N	Host		
2017	Hard Workers	Various roles		
2017	Produce 101 Season 2	Host	Episode 6, filling in for the regular host, BoA	
2017	We Have Delivery	Delivery man		
2017	Sherlock's Room	Investigator		
2017	The Super Rich Project 2	Host		
2017	2017 Quiz on Korea	Host		
2017	Borg Mom	Radio DJ	Cameo appearance in episode 7	
2017	Fearless Guys	Mentor		
2017, 2018	Super Market	Host	Special host for two episodes, with other members of Super Junior	
2017–2020	The Best Cooking Secrets	Host		
2018	2018 Idol Star Athletics Bowling Archery Rhythmic Gymnastics Aerobics Championships	Host		
2018	Super TV	Himself	Season 1 and 2, along with other members of Super Junior	
2018	Battle Trip	Host	Episodes 100–103	
2018	Real Life Men and Women	Host	Season 2	
2018	Sell to Return	Himself / Member of Thailand team	Shot in Thailand and Malaysia in collaboration with the local home shopping shows	
2018	2018 Quiz on Korea	Host		
2018	2018 Idol Star Athletics Bowling Archery Rhythmic Gymnastics Foot Volleyball Championships	Host		
2019	2019 Idol Star Lunar New Year Athletics Bowling Archery Rhythmic Gymnastics Penalty Shoot-out Championships	Host		
2019	Under Nineteen	Host	Filling in for Kim So-hyun on episode 12, and co-hosting the final episode with her	
2019	Super Junior–Leeteuk no Hitori Tabi: Kagoshima hen	Host	Japanese travel show shot in Kagoshima Prefecture, Kyushu	
2019	Beauty No.9	Host	A Thailand-based beauty talk show	
2019	2019 Chuseok Idol Star Championships	Host		
2019	Melody Bookstore	Host		
2019–2020	Analog Trip	Himself / First aider	A travel documentary shot in Jogjakarta, Indonesia	
2019–2021	Hidden Track	Host	Season 1–3	
2020	2020 Lunar New Year Idol Star Championships	Host		
2020	Favorite Entertainment	Manager		
2020	Home Cooking Live	Host	Episode 10, filling in for the regular host, Kyuhyun	
2020	2020 Miss Korea	Host		
2020–2021	Soo-mi's Side Dishes	Disciple		
2020–2021	People of Trot	Manager		
2020–2021	Neighbourhood Two-Top	Host		
2020–2022	Super Junior's Idol vs Idol	Host	Japanese variety show	
2021	Idol Star Championships: Hall of Fame	Host		
2021	Super Junior Comeback Show House Party	Himself	With other members of Super Junior	
2021	Don't be the First One!	Himself	Episode 42	
2021	K-Pop Evolution	Himself	Documentary series	
2021	The Great Home Cooking Research Institute	Host		
2021	Candy Singers	Host		
2021	MAMA: The Original K-Pop Awards	Himself	Documentary series	
2021	Work Later, Drink Now	Television host	Cameo in episodes 11 and 12	
2021–2022	Beauty and Luxury	Host	Season 6 and 7	
2022	Knowing Bros	Host / Yoo Jae-teuk (Note: Parody of Yoo Jae-suk)	Episodes 317, 318, 325 and 334	
2022	My Teenage Girl	Host	Lunar new year holiday special	
2022	My Boyfriend Is Better	Host	Episode 3, filling in for Lee Yong-jin	
2022	Gear GODs	Host		
2022	Boss in the Mirror	Boss		
2022	Terrace On	Host		
2022	Super Junior–Leeteuk no Hitori Tabi: Nagasaki hen	Host		
2022–2023	Birdie Boys	Golfer		
2023	The Queen	Host		
2023	Super Junior: The Last Man Standing	Himself	Super Junior's backstory documentary	
2023	K-Pop Generation	Himself		
2023	Show King Night	Judge		
2023	Fan Pick	Host		
2023	Super Junior-Leeteuk no Hitori Tabi: Tochigi hen	Host		
2024	Han Moon-cheol Blackbox Review	Host	1 episode	
2024	Field Marvel	Host		
2024	DNA Lover	Karaoke box owner	Episode 5	
2024	SCOOL	Host		
2024	Song Camp	Host / mentor		
2024	The Game Caterers	Himself	SM episode	
2024–2025	Super Junior-Leeteuk no Hitori Tabi: Kōchi hen	Host		
2024–2026	Chef's Unexpected Landing: Hakka Kitchen (Note: Chinese: 廚師的迫降:客家廚房; pinyin: Chúshī de pòjiàng: Kèjiā chúfáng)	Restaurant owner	A joint Taiwanese-Korean show, 2 seasons	
2025	K-Pop the Beginning: SMTown 30	Himself / interviewee		
2025	Mnet 30th Chart Show	Host	MAMA Awards behind-the-scenes	
2025	Woke Up to SuperTV	Himself		
2025	Nae Muttaero	Himself / panelist		
2026	Super Junior-Leeteuk no Hitori Tabi: Fuyu no Okinawa hen	Host		

== Web series ==
Performances in web series
Year	Title	Role	Note	Ref.
2016	my SMT	Host		
2017–2024	SJ Returns	Various roles	Season 1–5, along with other members of Super Junior	
2018	Secret Queen Makers	Leeteuk	Episodes 2 and 3	
2019	Money Investigation Unit	Host	Produced by Industrial Bank of Korea	
2020	SJ News	News anchor		
2020	War of Fame	Himself		
2021	SJ Global	Office worker		
2021	Super Junior Future Revolution Team	Player	Promotional show for Marvel Future Revolution	
2021–2022	Sajangnim Nice Shot	Host		
2021–2022	Super Trip	Host	Travel show, with Donghae and Ryeowook	
2022	World Boys	Global citizen	Produced by World Vision	
2023	Knight of the Lamp	Himself	with Super Junior	
2024	Let Me Tell You That	Host		
2024	Fall in Geobukseom	Host		
2025	Save Our Stocks	Host	Season 3	

== Radio shows ==
Radio performances
Year	Title	Network	Ref.
2006	Leeteuk's Music Show	TBS	
2006–2011, 2016	Super Junior Kiss the Radio	KBS Cool FM	
2020	Party B	Naver NOW	

== Stage ==
Stage performances
Year	Title	Role	Note	Ref.
2013	The Promise	Miss Kim	Performed at Haeoreum Theater, National Theater of Korea, from January 9–20, produced by the Ministry of National Defense	
2025	SM Classics Live 2025 in Tokyo	Moderator	Orchestra concert performed by the New Japan Philharmonic at Tokyo International Forum on September 15, 2025	

== Music videos ==
Appearances in music videos
Year	Title	Artist(s)	Note	Ref.
2011	"Ice Cream"	JOO and Leeteuk		
2014	"Salgosiptta"	Kim Jang-hoon		
2015	"Mokssori (Your Voice)"	None credited (Note: Originally sung by Noel)	Promotional music video for I Can See Your Voice	
2016	"My Hero"	Leeteuk, Suho and Kassy		
2020	"Siseongojeong"	Super Five		
2020	"Corona Igija"	Nam Jin, Lee Ja-yeon, Seol Woon-do, Jung Su-ra, Park Sang-min, Shin Yu, and Yuk Joong-wan	Jointly produced by Korea Singers Association and Federation of Korean Music Performers, a song about the COVID-19 pandemic	
2022	"The Cure"	Leeteuk, Kangta, BoA, U-Know, Taeyeon, Onew, Suho, Irene, Taeyong, Mark, Kun and Karina		

== Others ==
Leeteuk also hosted the following events:

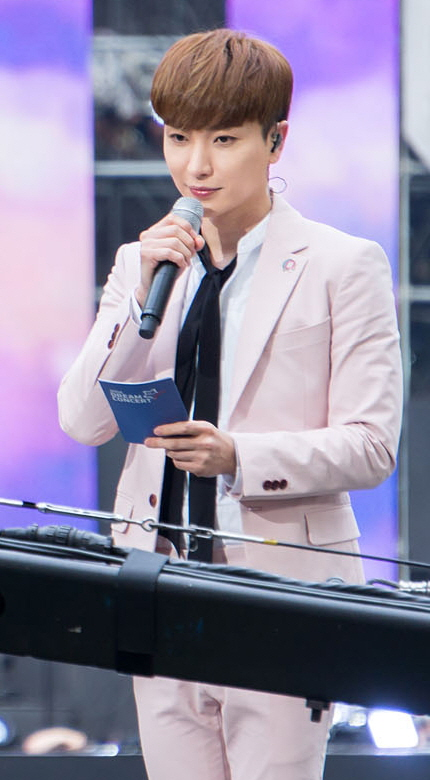
Leeteuk hosting the 2016 Dream Concert at the Seoul World Cup Stadium

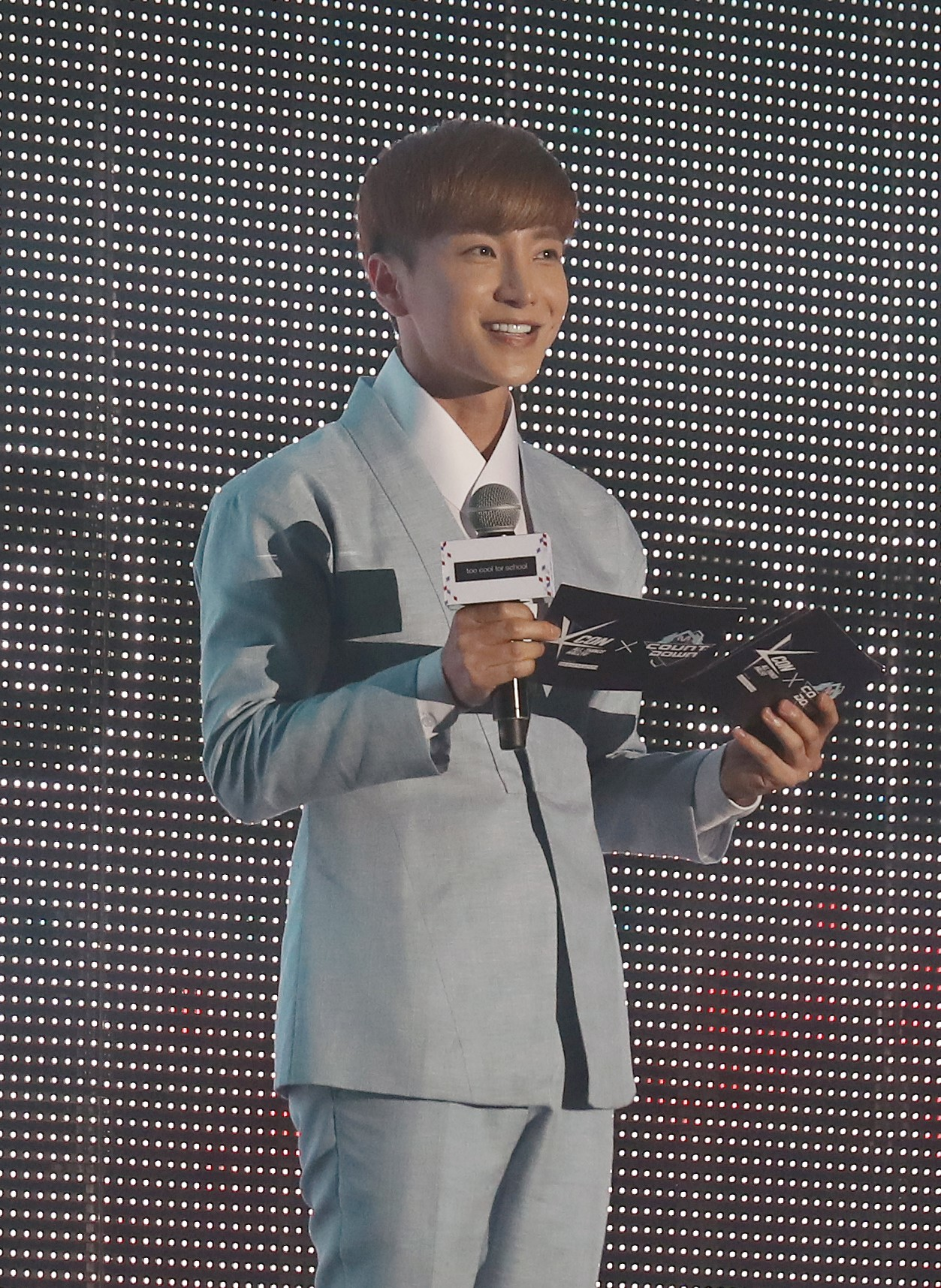
Hosting KCON Paris in 2016

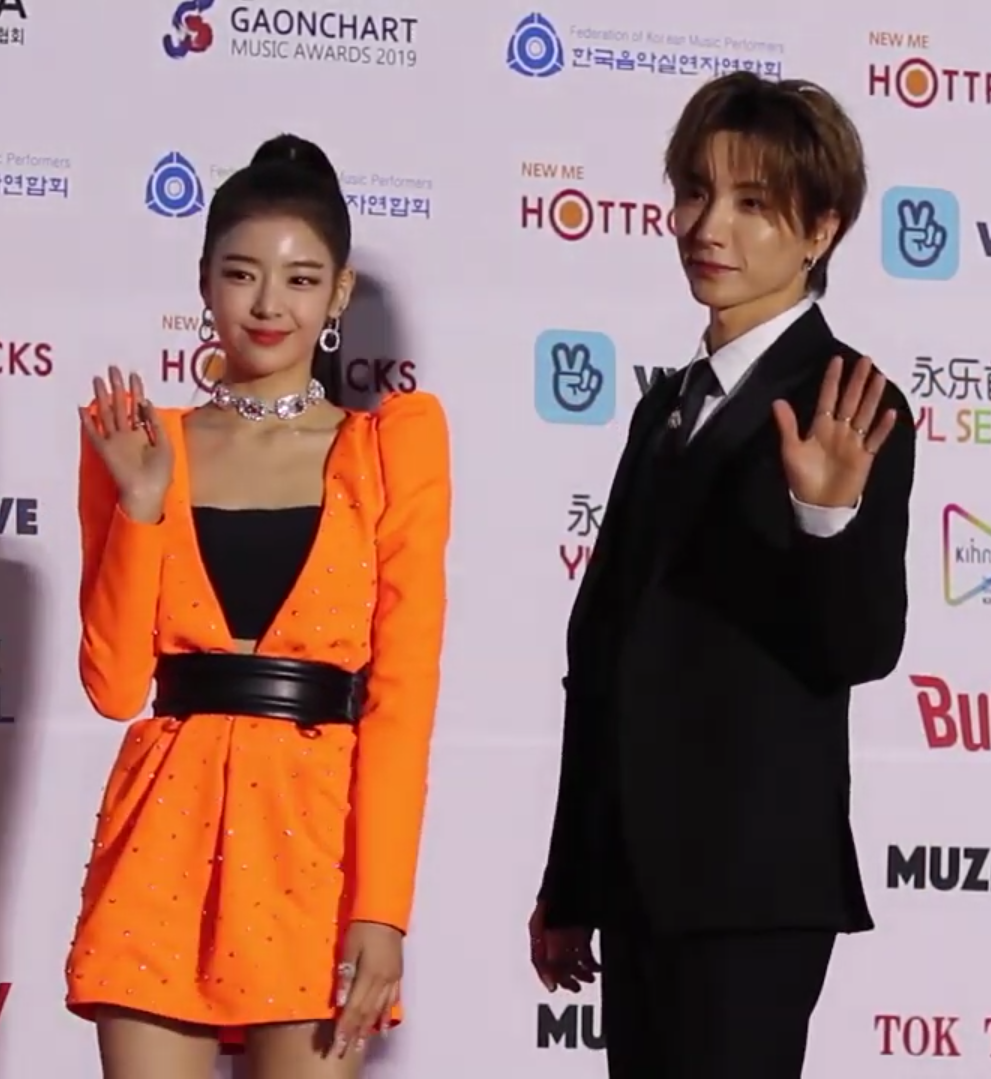
Leeteuk with co-host, Itzy's Lia (left), at the 9th Gaon Chart Music Awards red carpet

Other performances
Year	Event	Ref.
2009	f(x)'s debut showcase	
2011	2011 Melon Music Awards	
2012	26th Golden Disc Awards – Day 1	
2012	Exo's debut showcase	
2013	2013 Military Service Awards	
2014	2014 Asia Song Festival	
2015	29th Golden Disc Awards – Day 2	
2015	24th Seoul Music Awards	
2015	4th Gaon Chart Music Awards	
2015	Super Junior-D&E's The Beat Goes On showcase	
2015	2015 Dream Concert	
2015	2015 Asia Song Festival	
2016	30th Golden Disc Awards – Day 2	
2016	5th Gaon Chart Music Awards	
2016	8th Style Icon Asia	
2016	Power of K 2016: Korea TV Fes in Japan	
2016	KCON Paris	
2016	2016 Dream Concert	
2016	Exo's Ex'Act press conference	
2016	Exomentary Comeback Stage	(Note: Exo's Ex'Act showcase)
2016	2016 Asia Song Festival	
2016	KBS Youth Concert	(Note: A concert held in conjunction with 2016 Korea Happiness Education Fair, organised by the Ministry of Education of South Korea)
2016	See-Saw preview screening	(Note: See-Saw is a documentary film produced by SM C&C)
2016	2016 Asia Artist Awards	
2016	7 First Kisses press conference	
2017	K-Drama Festa in Pyeongchang	(Note: A concert event to promote Pyeongchang ahead of the 2018 Winter Olympics)
2017	6th Gaon Chart Music Awards	
2017	Going Together Concert	(Note: A concert held jointly by the Ministry of Culture, Sports and Tourism of Vietnam and Embassy of South Korea in Vietnam to commemorate the 25th anniversary of the diplomatic relations between the two countries)
2017	23rd 2017 Dream Concert	
2017	2017 Incheon Airport Sky Festival K-pop Concert	(Note: A part of the annual outdoor music festival held by the Incheon International Airport)
2017	2017 Asia Song Festival	
2017	2017 Dream Concert in Pyeongchang	(Note: A special Dream Concert held as part of the Cultural Olympiad to accompany the 2018 Winter Olympics in Pyeongchang)
2017	2017 Asia Artist Awards	
2018	7th Gaon Chart Music Awards	
2018	2018 Asia Song Festival	
2018	2018 MBN Hero Concert	
2018	2018 Asia Artist Awards	
2018	1st Korea Popular Music Awards	(Note: An award established in 2018 by the Korea Singers Association, the Korea Entertainment Producer's Association, the Recording Industry Association of Korea, the Federation of Korean Music Performers, and the Korea Music Copyright Association)
2019	25th Dream Concert	
2019	Super Junior-D&E's Danger press conference	
2019	2019 Asia Artist Awards in Vietnam	
2020	9th Gaon Chart Music Awards	
2020	K-Pop Global Donation Concert World Is One	(Note: A charity concert organised by Munhwa Broadcasting Corporation and World Vision Korea for COVID-19 pandemic relief fund)
2020	26th Dream Concert – Day 1	
2020	2020 Taekwondo Performance in Seoul	
2020	DMZ Concert	(Note: A concert event held at Goyang Stadium, which is a part of the 2020 Live in DMZ festival, a peace festival which was held at Imjingak near the Korean Demilitarized Zone (DMZ))
2020	K-Food Special Force	(Note: A part of 2020 K-Culture Festival organised by the Ministry of Culture, Sports and Tourism of South Korea, and Korean Foundation for International Cultural Exchange)
2020	2020 Asia Artist Awards	
2021	10th Gaon Chart Music Awards	
2021	Aespa's "Next Level" press conference	
2021	27th Dream Concert	
2021	Ontact 2021 Yeongdong-daero K-Pop Concert	(Note: A part of 2021 Gangnam festival)
2021	2021 Asia Artist Awards	
2022	Wemix 2022 KPGA Professional Golf Club League launching ceremony	
2022	2022 Asia Artist Awards in Japan	
2023	Riizing Day: Riize Premiere	
2023	2023 Riize 100 Days Party: Hello Briize	
2024	Kyuhyun's Restart showcase	
2024	Circle Chart Music Awards 2023	
2024	30th Dream Concert	
2025	K-Flow3 Concert in Taiwan	
2025	Riize's Odyssey showcase	
2026	35th Seoul Music Awards	

== See also ==
- Super Junior filmography
