= Super Junior filmography =

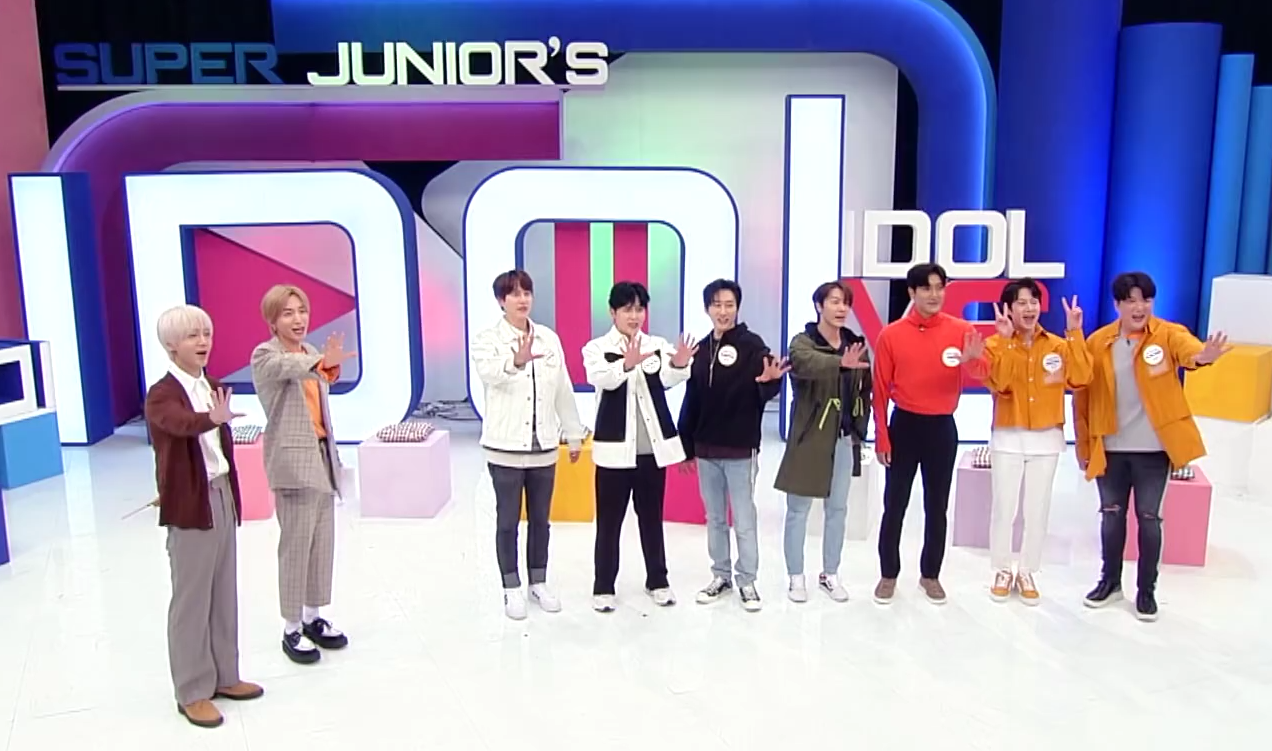
Super Junior at the set of Super Junior's Idol vs Idol

Super Junior is a South Korean boy band. Formed in 2005 by producer Lee Soo-man of S.M. Entertainment, the group comprised a total of thirteen members at its peak. Super Junior originally debuted with twelve members, consisting of leader Leeteuk, Heechul, Hangeng, Yesung, Kangin, Shindong, Sungmin, Eunhyuk, Siwon, Donghae, Ryeowook and Kibum. Kyuhyun joined the group in 2006.

== Film ==
Film performances
Title	Year	Role	Ref.
Attack on the Pin-Up Boys	2007	High school students	
Super Show 3 3D	2011	Themselves	
I AM.	2012	Themselves	
Super Show 4 3D	2013	Themselves	
SM Town The Stage	2015	Themselves	

== Television ==
Television appearances
Title	Year	Role	Note	Ref.
Super Junior Show	2005–2006	Cast members	Members of Super Junior 05	
Super Adonis Camp	2006	Cast members	Leeteuk, Han Geng, Yesung, Kangin, Shindong, Sungmin, Eunhyuk, Donghae, Ryeowook	
Princess Diary	2006	Cast members		
Anycall School Attack	2006	Musical guest		
Mystery 6	2006	Themselves	Members of Super Junior 05	
Full House	2006	Cast members		
Super Junior Mini-Drama	2006	Hosts	All members, with cameo appearances of Heechul, Han Geng, Siwon, Kibum	
Super Junior Unreleased Scene	2006–2007	Themselves		
Super Summer	2007		Siwon, Donghae, Kibum	
Disablitiy Festival – I Have a Dream	2007	Themselves/ Wheelchair basketball players		
TV Animal Farm	2007		Leeteuk, Yesung, Shindong, Sungmin, Eunhyuk, Donghae, Ryeowook	
Super Junior's Music Diary	2007	Hosts	Leeteuk, Yesung, Kangin, Shindong, Sungmin, Eunhyuk, Donghae	
Explorers of the Human Body	2007–2008	Cast members		
The Comedy Bootcamp	2008	Cast members	Season 3, Leeteuk, Yesung, Kangin, Shindong, Eunhyuk, Donghae, Sungmin	
Super Junior Unbelievable Story	2008	Leeteuk, Sungmin	Leeteuk, Sungmin	
Idol Show	2008	Hosts	Season 1, members of Super Junior-H	
Joseon Police 2	2008	Police officers	Cameo	
Human Network Miracle	2009	Hosts	Leeteuk, Shindong, Eunhyuk	
Super Junior in EXIT	2010	Themselves	A special program for MTV EXIT (End Exploitation and Trafficking) campaign	
Super Junior's Foresight	2010–2011	Hosts	Leeteuk, Eunhyuk, Kyuhyun	
Super Junior, K-Pop Jeonseol-eul Kkumkkuda!	2012	Themselves	Concert documentary	
Star Life Theater	2012		All members, except Heechul	
Saturday Night Live Korea	2012, 2017	Hosts	Season 2 episode 12, and season 9 episode 32	
Super Junior M's Guest House	2014–2015		Super Junior-M	
Super Junior One Fine Day	2014–2015	Cast members	A travel show shot in Switzerland, starring Leeteuk, Eunhyuk and Donghae	
Surplines Super Junior	2015		Leeteuk, Eunhyuk, Kyuhyun	
Super Junior Devil's Feast	2015	Cast members	Leeteuk, Heechul, Yesung, Kangin, Eunhyuk, Siwon, Donghae, Ryeowook, Kyuhyun	
Super TV	2018	Cast members	2 seasons; starring Leeteuk, Heechul, Yesung, Shindong, Eunhyuk, Donghae, Siwon, Ryeowook	
Analog Trip	2019–2020	Cast members	Travel documentary shot in Indonesia, featuring Leeteuk, Shindong, Eunhyuk, Donghae and TVXQ members	
Super Junior's Idol vs Idol	2020–2022	Hosts	Japanese variety show, Leeteuk and Yesung	
Super Junior Comeback Show House Party	2021	Cast members	To commemorate the release of their 10th album, The Renaissance	
Archive K	2021	Themselves	Episode "K-pop across the sea II"	
K-Pop Evolution	2021	Themselves	Cameo appearance in episode "K-Pop Goes Global"	
Super Junior The Last Man Standing	2023	Themselves	Super Junior's backstory documentary	
Knights of the Lamp	2023	Themselves	Travel show shot in Saudi Arabia featuring Leeteuk, Shindong, Eunhyuk, Donghae, Ryeowook and Kyuhyun	
Woke Up to Super TV	2025	Themselves		
Nightline	2025	Themselves	Only Leeteuk, Heechul and Eunhyuk	
Reply High School	2026	Themselves/students from SuJu High School		

== Web series ==
Appearances in web series
Title	Year	Role	Note	Ref.
SJ Returns	2017–2021	Cast members	Season 1–4; starring Leeteuk, Heechul, Yesung, Shindong, Eunhyuk, Donghae, Siwon, Ryeowook, Kyuhyun	
SJ News	2020	Media personnel		
War of Fame	2020	Themselves		
SJ Global	2021	Office workers		
Super Trip	2021	Cast members		

== Radio ==
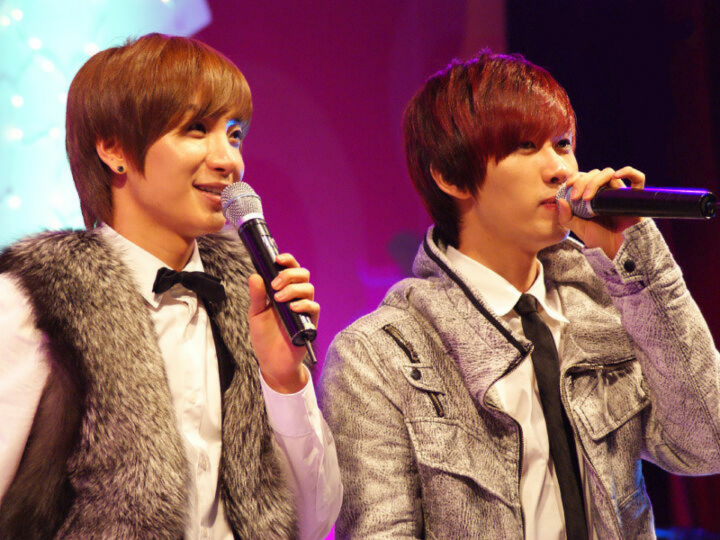
Leeteuk and Eunhyuk during Super Junior Kiss The Radio public broadcast in 2009

Radio appearances
Title	Year	Station	DJ(s)	Note	Ref.
Super Junior Kiss The Radio	2006–2011	KBS Cool FM	Leeteuk, Eunhyuk	Leeteuk missed 33 broadcasts in April and May 2007 due to injuries sustained in car accident	
Super Junior Kiss The Radio	2011–2013	KBS Cool FM	Sungmin, Ryeowook		
Super Junior Kiss The Radio	2013–2016	KBS Cool FM	Ryeowook		
Super Junior Kiss The Radio	2016	KBS Cool FM	Leeteuk		
Party B	2020	Naver NOW	Leeteuk, Shindong	Web radio	
D&E Show	2021–2022	Naver NOW	Donghae, Eunhyuk	Web radio	

== Commercials ==
Commercial film appearances
Company	Year	Promoting	Title	Song	Region	Ref.
Binggrae	2006	Ice cream: Deowisanyang	—N/a	—N/a	South Korea	
Ivy Club	2006	School uniform	—N/a	—N/a	South Korea	
Ivy Club	2008	School uniform	—N/a	—N/a	South Korea	
Haitai Beverage	2008	Sunkist Sweetieade	—N/a	—N/a	South Korea	
KOBACO	2008	Public service announcement: Blood donation	—N/a	—N/a	South Korea	
PepsiCo	2009	Pepsi	—N/a	—N/a	Greater China	
Seoul Metropolitan Government	2009	Seoul	"Infinitely yours, Seoul"	—N/a	Worldwide	
Korea Tourism Organization	2009	South Korea	"Korea, Sparkling-Four Seasons, Four Senses"	—N/a	Southeast Asia	
Yamaha Motor Company	2010	Motorcycle: Yamaha Fino	—N/a	—N/a	Thailand	
12 Plus	2011	12 Plus Sexy Cologne	"Twilight"	—N/a	Thailand	
Circle K Sunkus	2011	Korean food exhibitions	"Korea Fair with Super Junior"	"Bijin (Bonamana)"	Japan	
SKY Perfect JSAT Group	2011	SKY PerfecTV	"Sukapā! K-pop nan demo kan demo hen"	"Mr. Simple"	Japan	
Kyochon	2012	Fried chicken: Super Junior's K-Chicken	—N/a	—N/a	South Korea	
Kyochon	2013	Fried chicken	"Between Super Junior and Ailee"	—N/a	South Korea	
Tony Moly	2013	Cosmetics	—N/a	—N/a	Greater China	
Lotte Duty Free	2015	Jeju Island	"The beginning of lyrical journey in Jeju"	—N/a	South Korea	
Avajar	2018	Face slimming mask: Perfect V Lifting Premium Mask	"Change Yourself"	—N/a	South Korea	
Lotte Duty Free	2018	Duty-free shop	"Yum Super Junior"	—N/a	South Korea	
Lotte Duty Free	2019	Duty-free shop	"Let's Do something Fun"	—N/a	South Korea	
Lotte Duty Free	2023	Online and offline duty-free shop	"Must-visit place in Korea, Lotte Duty Free with Super Junior"	—N/a	South Korea	

== See also ==
- Super Junior videography § Filmography
- List of Leeteuk performances
- List of Kim Hee-chul performances
