= Ga-young =

- Hangul: 가영
- RR: Gayeong
- MR: Kayŏng

Ga-young is a Korean given name.

People with this name include:

- Kim Ga-young (pool player) (born 1983), South Korean professional pool player
- Kim Ga-young (actress) (born 1991), South Korean actress and singer
- Moon Ga-young (born 1996), German-born South Korean actress and model

Fictional characters with this name include:

- Moon Ga-young, in 2004 South Korean television series Sweet 18
- Park Ga-young, in 2006 South Korean television series Mystery 6
- Yoo Ga-young, in 2008 South Korean film Romantic Island
- Lee Ga-young, in 2012 South Korean television series Fashion King
- Seong Ga-young, in 2021 South Korean Netflix series Squid Game

== See also ==
- List of Korean given names
