= 2018 Idol Star Athletics Bowling Archery Rhythmic Gymnastics Foot Volleyball Championships =

- Also known as: 2018 Idol Star Athletics Championships Chuseok Special
- Genre: Sports; Variety show
- Written by: Kim Jeong-min; Byun Eun-jeong; Woo Eun-jeong; Kim Young-ri; Kim So-young; Nam Soo-hee
- Directed by: Choi Haeng-ho
- Presented by: Jun Hyun-moo; Leeteuk; Nayeon
- Country of origin: South Korea
- Original language: Korean
- No. of episodes: 2

Production
- Executive producer: Park Jeong-gyu
- Production locations: Goyang Gymnasium; Jungangro 1601, Ilsanseo-gu, Goyang, Gyeonggi-do
- Running time: 140 minutes

Original release
- Network: MBC
- Release: September 24 – September 26, 2018

The 2018 Idol Star Athletics Bowling Archery Rhythmic Gymnastics Foot Volleyball Championships (Korean: 2018 아이돌스타 육상 볼링 양궁 리듬 체조 족구 선수권 대회) was held at Goyang Gymnasium in Goyang, South Korea on August 20 and 27, 2018 and was broadcast on MBC on September 25 and 26, 2018.

== Synopsis ==
The show features male and female K-pop entertainers, which competes in various sports competitions. To shorten the competition, every competition (except 60 m individual sprints and 4x100 relay) had only four teams involved in a single knockout. Men's footvolley made its debut to competition, replacing Male Team Aerobics.

Footvolley is the only 4-on-4 competition where teams are composed of members from different idol groups, and non-idol coaches provide instructions for two teams from the same bracket, so they have less likelihood of facing each other. Teams can bounce once before having to attack or defend, and touch between two teammates before hitting to the other side. Coaches can review twice, where all umpires and line judges (five members in total) will discuss the ruling, majority voting wins. First to 15 wins the round, best of three rounds wins.

Archery reverts to full 10-shot format for all rounds. To avoid confusion, however, the elected ace member from each team takes the final four shots, while the other two take three each.

Ten-pin bowling was filmed on a separate location on a separate date. The scoring has also been simplified. A strike is 30 points, a spare, depending on the first attempt, is from 10–19 points. Consecutive strikes and spares do not add together, and no bonus frames after a strike on the 10th frame, so the perfect score remains at 300 points.

== Cast ==
=== Presenters ===
Jun Hyun-moo, Super Junior's Leeteuk and Twice's Nayeon hosted the show. Girl's Day Yura was the special host for male bowling.

=== Main ===
Full 2018 ISAC Chuseok's line-up

Male

Wanna One, Seventeen, Stray Kids, VIXX, NU'EST W, The Boyz, NCT, Astro, UNB, ONF, Blanc7, Golden Child, Myteen, 14U, and MXM, Shindong (Super Junior), Yang Sei-hyung.

Female

(G)I-dle, CLC, KHAN, H.U.B., Girlkind, GWSN, Nine Muses, Dreamcatcher, Limesoda, Red Velvet, Momoland, April, Pristin, ELRIS, GFriend, Cosmic Girls, Weki Meki, GBB, Twice, Fromis 9, Flashe, Hey Girls.

== Results ==
=== Men ===
Athletics

Event	Gold	Silver	Bronze
60 m	Y (Golden Child)	Jangjun (Golden Child)	No Winner
60 m	Y (Golden Child)	Jean Paul (Blanc7)	No Winner
4 × 100 m	Jangjun (Golden Child); Joochan (Golden Child); Seungmin (Golden Child); Y (Golden Child)	Hoshi (Seventeen); Dino (Seventeen); Wonwoo (Seventeen); DK (Seventeen)	Eric (The Boyz); Sangyeon (The Boyz); Jacob (The Boyz); Sunwoo (The Boyz) (UNB was disqualified due to the first runner veering off the team's own lane)

Archery

Event	Gold	Silver	Bronze
Men's Team	Hwall (The Boyz); Younghoon (The Boyz); Juyeon (The Boyz)	JinJin (Astro); Moonbin (Astro); Rocky (Astro)	No Winner

Bowling

Event	Gold	Silver	Bronze
Men's Team	Ravi & Ken (VIXX)	Shindong (Super Junior) & Yang Se-hyung	No Winner

Foot Volleyball

Event	Gold	Silver	Bronze
Foot Volleyball	JC Foot Volleyball King	Real Balladream	No Winner

=== Women ===
Athletics

Event	Gold	Silver	Bronze
60 m	Doori (GBB) (Lee Nagyung of Fromis 9 was disqualified due to line interference and made contact with Doori)	Yoohyeon (Dreamcatcher)	Eunseo (Cosmic Girls)
4 × 100 m	Cosmic Girls	Momoland	Weki Meki

Rhythmic Gymnastics

Event	Gold	Silver	Bronze
Women	Yukyung (Elris)	Seungyeon (CLC)	Naeun (APRIL)

Archery

Event	Gold	Silver	Bronze
Women's Team	Hana (Gugudan); Mina (Gugudan); Sejeong (Gugudan)	Wendy (Red Velvet); Yeri (Red Velvet); Irene (Red Velvet)	No Winner

Bowling

Event	Gold	Silver	Bronze
Women's Team	Gyeongree & Hyemi (Nine Muses)	Umji & Sowon (GFriend)	No Winner

== Ratings ==
Episode #	Original broadcast date	AGB Nielsen Ratings
Episode #	Original broadcast date	Nationwide
1	September 25, 2018	7.1%
2	September 26, 2018	7.9%
