= 2019 Idol Star Lunar New Year Athletics Bowling Archery Rhythmic Gymnastics Penalty Shoot-out Championships =

- Also known as: 2019 Idol Star Athletics Championships Lunar New Year Special
- Genre: Sports; Variety show
- Presented by: Jun Hyun-moo; Leeteuk; Twice
- Country of origin: South Korea
- Original language: Korean
- No. of episodes: 2

Production
- Production location: Samsan World Gymnasium
- Running time: 130 minutes

Original release
- Network: MBC
- Release: February 5 – February 6, 2019

The 2019 Idol Star Championships Lunar New Year Special (Korean: 2019 설특집 아이돌스타 육상 볼링 양궁 리듬체조 승부차기 선수권 대회) was held at Samsan World Gymnasium in Incheon and was broadcast on MBC on February 5 and 6, 2019.

== Cast ==
=== Presenters ===
Jun Hyun-moo, Super Junior's Leeteuk and Twice's Sana.

=== Participants ===
Full 2019 ISAC Lunar New Year's line-up

== Results ==
=== Men ===
Athletics

Event	Gold	Silver	Bronze
60 m	Y (Golden Child)	YunSung (Noir)	Lee Jang Jun (Golden Child)
4 × 100 m	Astro	Golden Child	Stray Kids

Archery

Event	Gold	Silver	Bronze
Men's Team	Seventeen	NCT 127	No Winner

Bowling

Event	Gold	Silver	Bronze
Men	Chanyeol (Exo)	Jaehyun (NCT 127)	No Winner

Foot Volleyball

Event	Gold	Silver	Bronze
Penalty Shoot-out	Astro	iKon	No Winner

=== Women ===
Athletics

Event	Gold	Silver	Bronze
60 m	YeonJung (Holics)	Lee Na Gyung (fromis 9)	JiHae (S.I.S)
4 × 100 m	Iz*One	Cosmic Girls	Gugudan

Rhythmic Gymnastics

Event	Gold	Silver	Bronze
Women	Rachel (APRIL)	YuKyung (Elris)	Shuhua((G)I-DLE)

Archery

Event	Gold	Silver	Bronze
Women's Team	Gugudan	Twice	No Winner

Bowling

Event	Gold	Silver	Bronze
Women's Team	Gugudan	Celeb Five	No Winner

== Ratings ==
Episode #	Original broadcast date	AGB Nielsen Ratings
Episode #	Original broadcast date	Nationwide
1	February 5, 2019	7.5%
2	February 6, 2019	6.1%
