= Super Junior-83z =

Subgroup of the South Korean boy band Super Junior

- Super Junior-83z in 2026

Background information
- Origin: Seoul, South Korea
- Genre: K-pop
- Years active: 2026–present
- Label: SM
- Spinoff of: Super Junior
- Members: Leeteuk; Heechul

Super Junior-83z is the seventh sub-unit of South Korean boy band Super Junior, formed and managed by SM Entertainment. The duo consists of two members: Leeteuk and Heechul. They debuted on July 13, 2026, with the extended play (EP) Promise.

The sub-unit was named "83z" because both members were born in 1983. With their distinct personalities and contrasting styles, the "chemistry arising from this contrast" is considered one of the sub-unit's defining characteristics.

== History ==
On April 3, 2026, 83z made a surprise debut appearance as a sub-unit during Super Junior's 20th-anniversary concert, *SUPER SHOW 10: SJ - CORE in SEOUL*, performing the new song "ONSAEMIRO" (meaning "always the same" or "consistent"), which sparked widespread attention and discussion among fans.

On April 13, 2026, Leeteuk and Heechul confirmed that they will be debuting as a new sub-unit Super Junior-83z as both were born in 1983. Concurrently, they would also launch an Asia-wide fan concert tour themed around "1983".

Due to the enthusiastic response to the Seoul show, organizers announced on April 27 that an additional performance would be held on July 24.

Additionally, during a phone call on a YouTube program on April 7, member Heechul mentioned a desire to reveal details about the project on July 1 (Leeteuk's birthday)—a remark that subsequently drew significant attention from fans and the media.

On July 1, 2026, it was officially announced that Super Junior-83z would make their official debut on July 13 with their first extended play (EP), Promise (Korean: 너를 위한 약속).

== Discography ==
=== Extended plays ===
List of extended plays, showing selected details, selected chart positions, sales figures, and certifications
Title	Details	Peak chart positions		Sales
Title	Details	KOR	JPN Oricon	Sales
Promise	Released: July 13, 2026; Labels: SM Entertainment; Formats: CD, digital download, streaming	2	— (Note: Promise did not enter the Oricon Albums Charts, but peaked at number 5 on the Oricon Digital Albums Chart.)	
