= Star Show 360 =

2016 South Korean television series

- Genre: Variety
- Country of origin: South Korea
- Original language: Korean

Production
- Production locations: Seoul, South Korea

Original release
- Network: MBC Every1
- Release: September 19 – November 7, 2016

Star Show 360 (Korean: 스타쇼 360) is a South Korean variety television show on MBC Every1, which aired Monday at 5:30 PM KST with a rerun at 11:10 PM KST. The show was hosted by Leeteuk, Tak Jae-hoon and Kim So-hye an I.O.I Member

== 2016 ==
Episode	Air Date	Guests
1	September 19	EXO
2	September 26	VIXX
3-4	October 3 & 10	I.O.I
5	October 17	Seventeen
6	October 24	Sistar
7	October 31	Apink
8	November 7	BTS
