= Explorers of the Human Body =

South Korean television series

- Also known as: Good Sunday - Explorers of the Human Body
- Genre: Comedy, Infotainment
- Starring: Shin Dong-yup; Super Junior
- Country of origin: South Korea
- Original language: Korean
- No. of episodes: 13

Production
- Running time: approx. 40 minutes

Original release
- Network: SBS
- Release: November 11, 2007 – February 3, 2008

Related
- Good Sunday

Explorers of the Human Body (Korean: 인체탐험대; Hanja: 人體探險隊) was one of the three shows of the newly revamped Good Sunday, a lineup of variety shows that airs every Sunday evening at 5:30 pm KST on SBS. The show's aim was to answer curious questions about the human body, where the Super Junior members perform the answers by doing experiments with their own bodies. The show succeeded in attracting a wide audience due to its comedic and educational content.

== Background ==
After previous popular shows X-Man and Reverse Drama ended, SBS's Good Sunday decided to air a new educational program, introducing the audience to the human body. Shin Dong-yup was chosen to be the lead MC, with the Super Junior members being regulars and co-MCs of the program. Ratings for the show became the highest of all three shows that aired in SBS's new Good Sunday lineup as the show is educational and entertaining to watch. It was also the first and currently the only variety show that included every member of Super Junior as regulars.

Each episode has a main topic to explore regarding the human body. In the first episode, which involved the tongue and blindness, the Super Junior members taste very hot peppers and extremely bitter-tasting drinks to test the mysteries of the tongue. The Super Junior members also test the blindness of their eyes by doing eye-fooling tests. Many episodes do not simply involve the physical features of the body. Episode six revolves around balance and episode eight deals with crying and tears.

== Episode summaries ==
=== Episode 1: Tongue & Eyes ===
Absentee: Kyuhyun

Tongue & Taste Buds

- Tea tasting: Yong Dam (bitter herbal tea)
- Drying and cool to numb the tongue
- Taste sensation
- chilli pepper tasting: Korean Chunhyang Pepper, Thai Prik ki nu Pepper, Mexican Habanero Pepper, and Indian Bhut Jolokia Pepper

Eyes & Change Blindness

- Spot the difference: flashing pictures on a screen
- Tricking the eyes: doctor switching (group prank)

=== Episode 2: Stomach ===
Absentee: Kyuhyun

- Co-MC: Shindong

Digestive system and the food that enters it

- swallowing food whilst upside down
- Eating dessert when stomach feels full
- Drinking beer and water

=== Episode 3: Strength Part I ===
Absentees: Kyuhyun and Heechul

- Co-MC: Eunhyuk
- Arm wrestling
- Electronic muscle stimulation

=== Episode 4: Strength Part II ===
Absentees: Kyuhyun, Heechul (first and last parts of the show) and Han Geng (last part of the show)

- Co-MC: Eunhyuk
- Weightlifting, the use of liquid ammonia and magnesium carbonate
- Long jumping; holding the golf balls and using tape on toe finger
- Lifting person with your fingers

=== Episode 5: Laughter ===
Absentees: Kyuhyun and Heechul

- Co-MC: Siwon
- laughing gas / Nitrous Oxide
- why is laughter contagious?
- laughter as exercise
- how to prevent the urge to laugh: natural salt, pulling the neck skin/fat, biting cheek fat, pressing the pressure points in the body

=== Episode 6: Balance ===
Absentees: Kyuhyun, Kangin, Yesung and Heechul (first half of the show)

- Co-MC: Shindong
- Sense of equilibrium
- Sense of balance
- Spinning machine
- Restoring the sense of balance after spinning by chewing on dried squid, holding balls of aluminium foil and spotting

=== Episode 7: Flexibility ===
This is the first episode in which Kyuhyun is present

- Co-MC: Heechul
- Improving flexibility in doing the splits: rubber banding the first two toes together, juggle (soccer) a hacky sack 10 times with your feet, and hitting the inner thighs in the horse-riding position.
- Enhancing flexibility and strength in your back: the grasshopper position (as seen in the Korean film, Oldboy).
- Improving flexibility in touching your toes: the "Octopus Dance," and massaging the ribs.
- Super Junior members try to contort into a 59 cm x 53 cm x 53 cm box after a demonstration by two Chinese contortionists.

=== Episode 8: Tears ===
- Co-MC: Ryeowook
- Slow-motion camera
- Acting out emotional scenes
- Two team stimulation with peppers/onions & fans
- Comparing saltiness of tears from stimulation & emotion
- Ryeowook & Eunhyuk Secret Camera

=== Episode 9: Reflexes Part I ===
The first of two episodes in which DBSK guests on the show along with Super Junior.

- Determining your reflex age with ruler dropping.
- Comparing reflex speeds of DBSK and Super Junior members by baseball sliding.
- The top 3 members from each group compete in a 1-on-1 dodgeball tournament.

=== Episode 10: Reflexes Part II ===
The second of two episodes in which DBSK guests on the show along with Super Junior.

- DBSK members taste the hottest peppers in the world (as seen in the first episode).
- DBSK and Super Junior members compete in a vertical leap test.
- DBSK and Super Junior members compete in how quickly the members are able to touch a falling ball (from 7m high) after running from a far distance (7-10m)

=== Episode 11: Archery ===
Absentees: Han Geng, Siwon (second half of the show)

- Two team separation (One to shoot moving target and Two to catch/deflect an arrow)
- Team One: Heechul, Kangin, Shindong, Kibum, Kyuhyun, Siwon
- Team Two: Leeteuk, Yesung, Sungmin, Eunhyuk, Donghae, Ryeowook

=== Episode 12: Breathing Underwater ===
Absentees: Siwon

- Two team separation (One to use props to breathe underwater and Two to exchange air underwater)
- Team One: Leeteuk, Heechul, Shindong, Donghae, Kibum, Kyuhyun
- Team Two: Han Geng, Yesung, Kangin, Sungmin, Eunhyuk, Ryeowook
- Team One contend against a Synchronized swimmer.
- Team One Method: A material object to seal in air.
- Team Two: Mouth-to-mouth.

=== Episode 13: Dogs' Sense of Smell ===
Absentees: Han Geng (first half of episode), Siwon (second half of episode)

- Testing the Police Dogs wearing special clothing
- Testing dog's sense of smell & comparing it to a human's
- Getting acquainted with the dogs/discussing how to fool sense of smell
- 30 minutes to find "fugitives" by smell
- Team One (Police): Leeteuk, Heechul, Donghae, Kibum, Kyuhyun, Siwon, Sungmin
- Team Two (fugitives): Yesung, Kangin, Eunhyuk, Ryeowook, Shindong, Han Geng

== End of first season ==
Due to Super Junior's busy schedules, the last episode before the program's hiatus aired on February 3, 2008. A new show, Find Mr.Kim, was the temporary replacement in the time slot, airing for three weeks.

It was later decided that instead of a hiatus, the program will end the season with thirteen episodes. Super Junior decided to leave the show due to their occupied schedules and busy preparations for their upcoming Asia-wide concert tour, Super Show. However, representatives of the program stated if there is a chance, a second season is considered. Change, the variety program hosted by Lee Hyo-ri and Shin Dong-yup with Noh Hong-chul, Kangin, Son Ho-young and Min Kyung-hoon as regulars, took over the time slot.

== See also ==
- Super Junior
- Seoul Broadcasting System
- Good Sunday
