= Super Junior Unbelievable Story =

- 슈퍼주니어의 기막힌 이야기
- Starring: Lee Sung-min; Leeteuk
- Country of origin: South Korea

Original release
- Network: MBC

Super Junior Unbelievable Story (Korean: 슈퍼주니어의 기막힌 이야기) is a 25-minute one-act drama starring Super Junior members Lee Sung-min and Leeteuk. It aired on MBC Every 1 on March 21, 2008 as part of MBC's Triple Drama lineup.

Although the drama surrounds Super Junior-T, only Sungmin and Leeteuk play themselves while the other members are played by comedians with very little resemblance.

== Plot ==
Super Junior-T are famous in South Korea for their song "Rokkugo", but Sungmin constantly feels overshadowed because of his lack of talent and good looks. Wandering the streets at night, the only person who recognizes him as a celebrity is an unattractive ahjumma. Sungmin meets a fortune teller and is given a magic skipping rope. Not knowing its secret, Sungmin uses it to try to get into shape. As he skips, he turns invisible just as the other members walk by. They voice their concerns about Sungmin's unwillingness right in front of him and they all walk away except Leeteuk. Offended by their lack of faith, Sungmin stops skipping and shocks Leeteuk with his sudden reappearance, causing him to pass out. Now knowing his ability, Sungmin goes on mischievous adventures such as trying to go into the women's bathing room.

One his way home he sees a woman (Enjel) being harassed by two men and decides to finally use his ability for a good deed. Right then, Leeteuk walks by just in time to see Sungmin turn invisible. Sungmin sneaks up on the thugs and scare them away. He, as well as Leeteuk, are immediately smitten by Enjel's beauty.

For the next few days, Sungmin uses his rope to follow her around until he becomes exhausted. Sungmin takes Enjel to the park where she tells him she has always wanted a puppy. Secretly, Sungmin uses his rope again and visits the fortune teller one more time. Leeteuk again passes by and sees Sungmin place the new puppy beside Enjel before disappearing. As Leeteuk looks on uncertainly, it is revealed to the audience that Leeteuk was actually the person who saved Enjel by throwing a can at the thugs. Not seeing him, they had thought that Sungmin had been the one to have physically thrown it, thinking him to be a ghost.

That night, Leeteuk takes the skipping rope from the sleeping Sungmin, saying it is for his own good. The next day, Sungmin discovers Enjel had not returned his calls, nor does she want to talk to him. Arriving at her house for answers, Enjel simply throws the rope back at him and calls him a liar. Leeteuk later confesses before a performance that he had visited Enjel and presumably told her the truth about the rope. Enraged by this revelation, Sungmin suddenly punches Leeteuk and lashes out about having trusted him as a leader and a brother. Leeteuk punches him back and exclaims that Super Junior-T is falling apart because of his aloof behavior, and that he should see what is in front of him. Sungmin angrily storms out, declaring he is quitting Super Junior-T.

Sungmin goes to Enjel's house one more time in hopes to catch one last glimpse of her before leaving. He peers through the door and hears someone singing. The unattractive ahjumma appears, singing about how she will deceive men tonight. She then transforms into Enjel. Horrified at what he sees, Sungmin runs away.

It appears that Leeteuk had been suspicious of the true identity and intentions of Enjel, and he had been right all along. Sungmin realizes the skipping rope had caused him more harm than good, and ultimately he throws it into the Han River.

The next day, holding his pride over the humiliation of knowing Enjel's secret, Sungmin still decides to leave Super Junior-T, much to the dismay of the members. As Sungmin walks away, Leeteuk tells him that they had promised to stay together till the end, and that Super Junior-T is nothing without him. Turning back, Sungmin tearfully confesses that he had been completely fooled, and hugs Leeteuk. The members all gather together as one group, now and for always.

Meanwhile, Enjel the ahjumma has retrieved the skipping rope from the Han River.
