= Analog Trip =

YouTube original series

- Official poster
- Also known as: Analog Trip in Indonesia
- Hangul: 아날로그 트립
- RR: Anallogeu teurip
- MR: Anallogŭ t'ŭrip
- Genre: Travel documentary
- Written by: Kim Hee-eun; Baek Joo-yeon; Shin Won-gyeom; Hwang Young-a; Kim Hye-hyeon
- Story by: Hwang Sun-young
- Directed by: Kim Ji-seon
- Starring: U-Know Yunho; Max Changmin; Leeteuk; Shindong; Eunhyuk; Donghae
- Country of origin: South Korea
- Original language: Korean
- No. of seasons: 1
- No. of episodes: 12+1 reunion episode

Production
- Executive producer: Lee Yea-jee
- Producer: Kim Ji-seon
- Production location: Indonesia
- Cinematography: Bae Yong-wook; Lee Chang-dae
- Editors: Jo Hyun-jung; Hwang Yun-chan; Heo A-bin; Choi So-mang; Lee Won-young; Cho Jung-young; Keum Yoon-jee
- Camera setup: Multi-camera
- Running time: 21 – 29 minutes
- Production company: SM C&C

Original release
- Network: YouTube Premium
- Release: 9 October 2019 – 1 January 2020

Related
- Analog Trip NCT 127: Escape From Magic Island

Analog Trip (Korean: 아날로그 트립) is a South Korean travel documentary that premiered on YouTube Premium on 9 October 2019. (Note: All episodes are available for free on SMTOWN YouTube channel starting 1 January 2020) The travel series was shot in Yogyakarta, Indonesia. It starred the members of the pop duo TVXQ; Changmin and Yunho, and boy band Super Junior; Leeteuk, Shindong, Eunhyuk, and Donghae.

== Premise ==
The cast has supposedly time travelled to the year 2002, when they were still trainees at SM Entertainment Starlight Academy. In order to return to 2019, they have to travel to several places in Yogyakarta, Indonesia and carry out tasks assigned to them. They also have to write diary entries, describing their daily experience during the travel and compose a theme song along the way. Their personal possessions were confiscated, and they were only supplied with a meager allowance, digital camera, MP3 players, old-fashioned mobile phones, backpacks and a guitar.

All episodes were shot in Indonesia except for episode 12, which was shot in South Korea and Japan.

== Cast ==
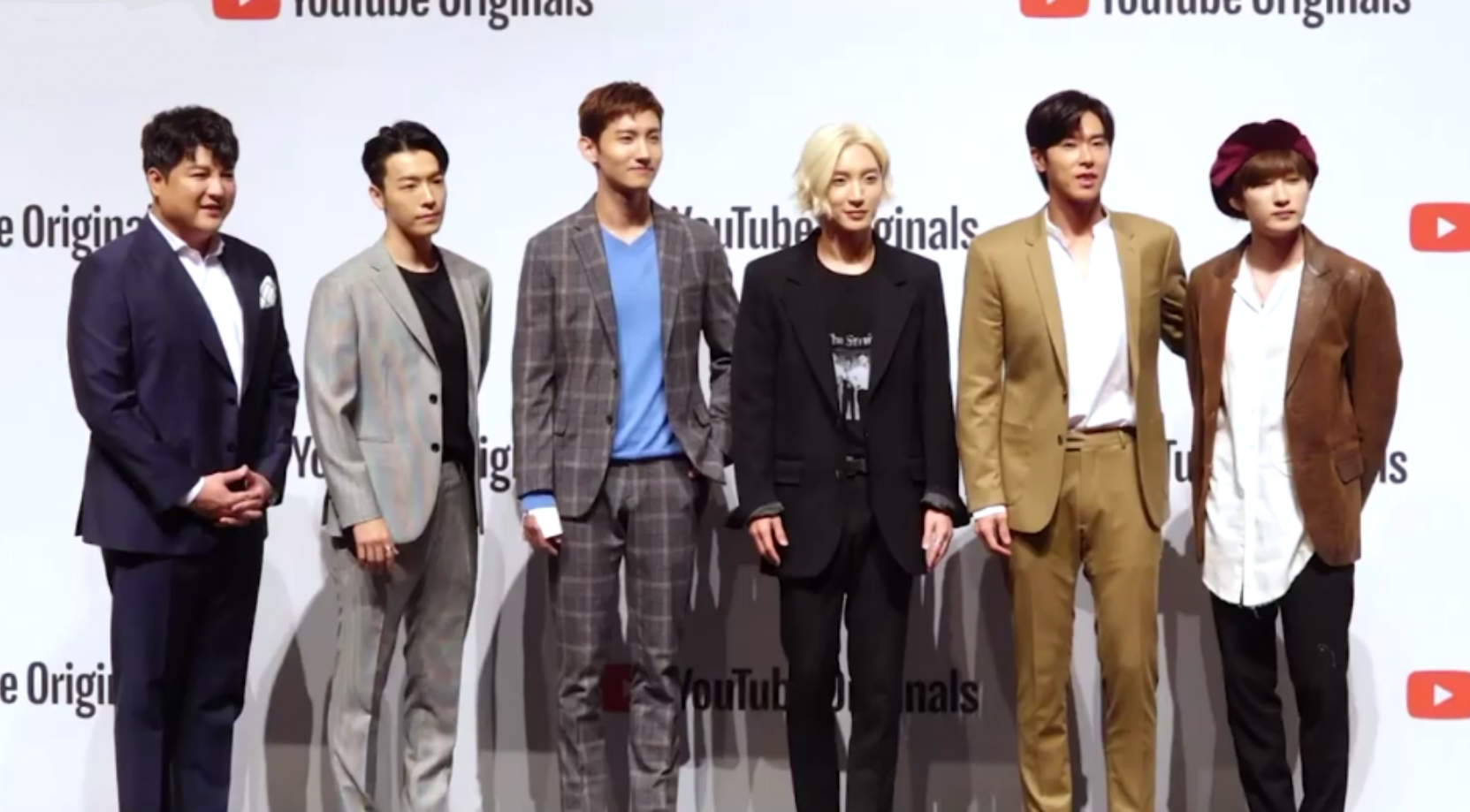
The cast members during Analog Trip press conference. From left to right: Shindong, Donghae, Changmin, Leeteuk, Yunho, and Eunhyuk

The cast are made up of the duo TVXQ and four members of the boyband Super Junior. All of them are signed artists under the company SM Entertainment.

Cast members:

- TVXQ's U-Know Yunho - He stated that his experience while filming the show "felt more like making real memories than working" as he had been only travelling for work and not for leisure.
- TVXQ's Max Changmin - He said that the journey was a time to reflect on their relationship with each other and how much they have changed compared to 15 or 16 years ago. He further said that the trip made each of them grow as a person.
- Super Junior's Leeteuk - He described his experience filming in Indonesia as hard and difficult as they have to be careful because they were shooting at cultural heritage sites. Despite that, he said that it was more memorable because of the challenges.
- Super Junior's Shindong - He exclaimed that he was excited for the show being aired on YouTube Premium as they had only participated in television shows before.
- Super Junior's Eunhyuk - He stated that as he has many memories of being trainees with Yunho, Changmin and Donghae, he felt it was less like a trip and more like a vacation at a holiday cottage.
- Super Junior's Donghae - He said that he has fond memories with Yunho as they lived in the same dorm during trainee days, and with Changmin as they enlisted in the military together, but this is the first time he had ever travelled with them. He said that "it was a fun experience" and is open to the idea of doing it again in the future.

== Episodes ==
=== Main episodes ===
No.	Title	Directed by	Original release date	Free view release date
1	"Travel back"	Kim Ji-seon	9 October 2019	9 October 2019
1	"The Reality of Analog Trip Travel"; Transliteration: "Anallogeu teurip yeohaeng-ui silche" (Korean: 아날로그 트립 여행의 실체)	Kim Ji-seon	9 October 2019	9 October 2019
The cast arrived at their hotel in Bali, Indonesia. They left their luggage in their shared living room and went to eat. When they returned to their room, they found that their luggage were missing and were replaced with backpacks. The cast were told that they had travelled back in time to 2002, when they were still trainees. Because of this, all their electronic devices were confiscated and exchanged with devices that are present in 2002 such as MP3 player and mobile phone. They were given instructions on how to return to the present time; by carrying out the tasks given to them, which includes filling up a photo album with photos taken at specific places, and composing a theme song for their trip.
2	"Ready, Set, Go!"	Kim Ji-seon	9 October 2019	23 October 2019
2	"'Analog Journey' Starts in Earnest"; Transliteration: "Bongyeokjeog-in 'anallogeu yeohaeng' sijak" (Korean: 본격적인 '아날로그 여행' 시작)	Kim Ji-seon	9 October 2019	23 October 2019
The cast assigned roles for each other to ease their trip. Changmin was in charge of the cast's allowances and spending, Shindong of photography and cameras, and Donghae of the guitar. Yunho was the porter; he kept their passports and was responsible for snacks, Leeteuk became their first aider and Eunhyuk was their tour guide. The next day, they took a flight to Yogyakarta. After settling in at the hotel, they booked a van for an easier mean of travel. Changmin started to feel pressured by his role as the production team only paid for their hotel but the cast had to pay for their transportation by themselves. The cast went to Borobodur, the biggest Buddhist temple in the world. Leeteuk tried to haggle for a cheaper entrance fee but he was not successful.
3	"Grandeur and Mystery"	Kim Ji-seon	9 October 2019	30 October 2019
3	"Step by Step, Greatness and Mystery"; Transliteration: "Hangeor-eum hangeor-eum geodaehamgwa sinbiham-eul" (Korean: 한걸음 한걸음 거대함과 신비함을)	Kim Ji-seon	9 October 2019	30 October 2019
The cast was amazed at the size of Borobodur. They climbed the steps to the peak of the temple, while admiring the carvings on the wall and the architectural build of the stupas. They took a picture at the stairs, checking off their first task. In the evening, they went to eat at a restaurant that served Korean food, after Changmin's protest of the food being expensive was dismissed through a majority vote. Donghae won the rock paper scissors game at the restaurant, and get to order a meal of his choosing on top of other meals. He ordered samgyeopsal, much to Changmin's chagrin.
4	"Off Road"	Kim Ji-seon	9 October 2019	6 November 2019
4	"Strong Taste of Off-Road"; Transliteration: "Gangnyeolhan opeurodeu-ui mat" (Korean: 강렬한 오프로드의 맛)	Kim Ji-seon	9 October 2019	6 November 2019
The cast reconvened at the hotel as the day ended. They started brainstorming about the theme song they were supposed to write. They also decided on a cheer for the trip. The next morning, Yunho was checking his stock of food when he realised one of the cup noodles was missing. During the journey to their next destination, Yunho confronted the rest of the cast about the cup noodle. Leeteuk, who had eaten it in the morning, tried to deflect the questions directed at him, making the cast correctly presumed he had eaten them. The cast arrived at the base camp of Mount Merapi. They rented jeeps and toured around the mountain. They visited the Sisa Hartaku Mini Museum, which displayed the recovered artifacts from the volcanic eruption in 2010.
5	"Heart to Heart"	Kim Ji-seon	9 October 2019	13 November 2019
5	"Honest Conversation"; Transliteration: "Jinsolhan daehwa" (Korean: 진솔한 대화)	Kim Ji-seon	9 October 2019	13 November 2019
The cast arrived at the Bunker Kaliadem and explored it for a while. Then, each of them took a picture with a tame owl. Leeteuk, who is afraid of birds managed to overcome his fear and completed the task. It was raining heavily as they went down the Mount Merapi. The cast experienced a rough terrain ride as they went to an off-roading course at the Kali Kuning river. In the evening, they went to have dinner at a restaurant at Jalan Malioboro. The cast talked about their rivalry and jealousy towards each other's group. Donghae and Yunho apologized to each other for ignoring each other's text when they were busy preparing for debut back then. The cast recalled on how watching the other's accomplishment always urging them to work harder as they are each other's pacemaker, and how lucky they are, to be able to laugh and talk about it without hard feelings years later as they had successful careers.
6	"To the Underwold"	Kim Ji-seon	9 October 2019	20 November 2019
6	"Is This Heaven or Hell?"; Transliteration: "Igos-eun cheongug-inga jiog-inga?" (Korean: 이곳은 천국인가 지옥인가?)	Kim Ji-seon	9 October 2019	20 November 2019
It is their third day in Yogyakarta. The cast departed early from the hotel to the next destination. During the journey, Leeteuk pretended he was hosting a morning radio show, with Yunho as guest, Eunhyuk as the foreign correspondent and Shindong as the weather presenter. They arrived at the entrance of the vertical cave, Goa Jomblang, which is located at Gunung Kidul Regency. The cast except Eunhyuk, hesitated to go down the cliff, especially when they saw that they will be lowered by ropes, which was operated by manual labour. The cast managed to curb their fear and went down without fanfares. Donghae admitted that it was quite difficult for him as he had both acrophobia and claustrophobia. The cast trekked for a while before arriving at the cave opening. In the post-credits scene, the cast were shown to take a group picture before their descent but nobody besides Eunhyuk was smiling.
7	"Light of Heaven"; Transliteration: "Cheongug-ui bit" (Korean: 천국의 빛)	Kim Ji-seon	9 October 2019	4 December 2019
The cast entered Goa Jomblang. The cave floor was muddy, making it very slippery. Leeteuk had muds entering his boots as he went knee-deep into the mud. The cast arrived at the part of the cave that was dubbed as "light of heaven" because it has a ceiling opening where light can shine through, which created a beautiful scenery. The cast took individual pictures under the light but they were unable to take a group picture as the light faded. During the returning trek, the cast realised that Yunho was being quiet. He denied that he was tired when asked by the worried cast members. During the confessional, Yunho admitted that he was experiencing headache, dizziness, and signs of panic attack. He said that the atmosphere in the cave reminded him of his near-death experience, when he was poisoned with super glue by an anti-fan back in 2006. He quickly recovered as they got out of the cave and ascended to the ground level. The cast departed to their next destination, the Kalisuci cave. They ate before starting their next activity, enjoying the lunch prepared by Yunho.
8	"Overcome"; Transliteration: "Geukbok" (Korean: 극복)	Kim Ji-seon	9 October 2019	4 December 2019
The cast were dressed in wetsuits as they prepared for river tubing at the Kalisuci cave, which is a river cave. Shindong, who is afraid of moving water, was determined to face his fear despite the cast assuring him that it is okay to opt out of the activity. Shindong took the lead in tubing after a short discussion among the cast. They all agreed that Shindong might be afraid to have a go if he saw how the others went ahead of him. The cast fulfilled their task of taking a picture in the river while forming a circle, holding hands and lying on their backs above the water. In the talking head interview, Shindong credited the mission's success to the cast members who kept encouraging him. After their activity ended, the cast were shocked that they have to climb many flight of stairs as they did not realise they went quite far downstream. Eunhyuk akin the experience as being back in the military boot camp.
9	"New Adventure"	Kim Ji-seon	9 October 2019	11 December 2019
9	"The Beginning of a New Challenge"; Transliteration: "Saero-un dojeon-ui sijak" (Korean: 새로운 도전의 시작)	Kim Ji-seon	9 October 2019	11 December 2019
In the evening of the third day, the cast went to have dinner at an open air restaurant, which had a great view of Yogyakarta. The cast took a picture there and wrote the day's diary memo detailing their experience. On the next day, they went to Parangtritis beach to do paragliding. Yunho, Donghae and Shindong, who had never paraglided before, were given priority to go first since they were under time constraints. Yunho was notably nervous about the mission as it was in his bucket list. As they were preparing at the top of the cliff, the instructor told them that they can't go as the wind is too strong and it is going to rain soon. The disappointed cast went to lunch nearby. As they eat, the sky cleared up. They quickly finished their meal and rushed back to the clifftop.
10	"Fly Together"	Kim Ji-seon	9 October 2019	18 December 2019
10	"Together"; Transliteration: "Hamkke" (Korean: 함께)	Kim Ji-seon	9 October 2019	18 December 2019
Donghae, Shindong and Yunho took turns paragliding. Donghae, who has acrophobia went first. Shindong, who went second, flew lower than the others as he was unlucky to have launched when it is not very windy. Yunho, who flew last is noticeably the most nervous out of everyone but he managed to carry out the activity without any problem. The rest of the cast decided not to paraglide because they might miss the sunset for the next task. Donghae, Shindong and Yunho went for a drink at a stall at the beach after they had landed but they had forgotten that Changmin had all of their money. Donghae borrowed some money from the crew to pay for the drinks. The cast reunited and discussed about writing their final diary memo to read out at the beach later. It turned out to be useless as it rained in the evening. Upon returning to the hotel room, they found that their smartphone and luggage were waiting in their rooms, indicating that they had returned to 2019 despite failing to carry out the final task.
11	"Come a Little Closer"	Kim Ji-seon	9 October 2019	25 December 2019
11	"You and Me"; Transliteration: "Neowa na" (Korean: 너와 나)	Kim Ji-seon	9 October 2019	25 December 2019
The cast were overjoyed that their electronic devices were returned to them. They held a discussion about the activity they are going to do on their final day in Indonesia. They decided to do a shooting for the music video of their soundtrack, even though they haven't finished writing the song. The next day, Shindong acted as the director of the music video and held a meeting with the cameramen to clarify which recording equipment were available. They departed to Prambanan temple for the activity. The cast chose their own preferred scene, with Shindong predicting that the end result will be chaotic. Afterwards, they went for lunch at a restaurant that overlooked the temple. They read letters that they had written towards each other, and reflect about their trip experience. They go through all the developed pictures and arranged them in an album. The episode end with them doing one final group cheer.
12	"Reunion"; Transliteration: "Jaehoe" (Korean: 재회)	Kim Ji-seon	9 October 2019	1 January 2020
The cast members returned to their busy life after they returned from Indonesia. During the lull in his schedule, Leeteuk met up with his frequent collaborator in composing, Team One Sound, (Note: Team One Sound consist of Peter Hyun, Young Sky and JDUB (Jinu), but only Peter and JDUB was credited as the composer for Analog Trip OST, "Come a little closer" along with Leeteuk.) to choose the music for the soundtrack from their list of compositions. They decided to use the music that Leeteuk previously used for his fanmeeting event in Japan. Changmin became their lyricist as he had shown his skill in writing rhyming lyrics during the travel. After the song is written, Leeteuk, Shindong, Eunhyuk and Donghae recorded the soundtrack. Yunho and Changmin did not participate because of their busy schedules. Shindong edited the music video at his production house office, the Walala Production. The cast, except Shindong who was ill, regrouped at the SMTown Live in Tokyo 2019 concert, which was held on 3 – 5 August 2019. In between the performances, they reunited backstage and watched the finished music video together, while reminiscing about their trip.
13	"Analog Trip After Party "Apa Kabar! Indonesia""	Kim Ji-seon	22 January 2020	18 February 2020
13	"TVXQ and Super Junior's "Analog Trip" After Party Live"; Transliteration: "Dongbangsingi-wa syupeojuni-eo-ui 'anallogeu teurip' dwipur-i ra-ibeu" (Korean: 동방신기와 슈퍼주니어의 '아날로그 트립' 뒤풀이 라이브)	Kim Ji-seon	22 January 2020	18 February 2020

=== Extras and behind the scenes ===
Title	Directed by	Original release date
"Introducing Analog Trip"	Kim Ji-seon	10 October 2019
"TVXQ and Super Junior's vlog Part 1"	Kim Ji-seon	11 October 2019
"TVXQ and Super Junior's vlog Part 2"	Kim Ji-seon	11 October 2019
"TVXQ and Super Junior's vlog Part 3"	Kim Ji-seon	11 October 2019
"Pick your roommate"	Kim Ji-seon	20 October 2019
"Poster shooting"	Kim Ji-seon	3 November 2019
"Private car talk Part 1"	Kim Ji-seon	10 November 2019
"Face close up shots"	Kim Ji-seon	17 November 2019
"Private car talk Part 2"	Kim Ji-seon	24 November 2019
"Private car talk Part 3"	Kim Ji-seon	1 December 2019
"'Mukbang' in Indonesia"	Kim Ji-seon	15 December 2019
"Yogyakarta tour guide"	Kim Ji-seon	22 December 2019
"'Come a Little Closer' MV"	Kim Ji-seon	27 December 2019
Analog Trip soundtrack, "Come a little closer" music video.
"Postcard read outs"	Kim Ji-seon	30 December 2019
"TVXQ! and SUPER JUNIOR Reacts to 'Come a little closer' MV"	Kim Ji-seon	3 January 2020

== Production ==
=== Development and casting ===
Director and producer, Kim Ji-seon said the idea of creating a program that showcase the raw and true appearances of the cast started back in 2018. She explained that while she was working with signed artists from SM Entertainment, she realised that they have a deeper and more meaningful relationships between them. It was more evident among the members of TVXQ and Super Junior who shared the same living quarters while they were still trainees, and grew into popularity together. Despite that, their relationship had never been documented on film before.

Kota Asakura, the director of YouTube Original for the APAC region said that both groups debuted at young age and does not have the opportunity to create memories, thus the travel documentary gave them chance to gain world experience. He further said the cast are chosen because they have good relationship and chemistry with each other. Kim stated that they chose travel documentary as the genre for Analog Trip as it combined the show format that was favoured by the South Korean yet did not alienate the international viewer even with the language barrier.

=== Filming ===
In March 2019, a circular by the Ministry of Tourism of Indonesia, dated 13 March 2019, was leaked online. It stated that a crew of 60 people from SM Production and Denise Production were to film around Yogyakarta from 20 to 24 March 2019, with the members of the duo TVXQ and boyband Super Junior as actors. The actual principal photography was carried out from 19 to 24 March 2019 in Indonesia. It was held at Bali on 19 March 2019 and Yogyakarta, from 20 to 24 March 2019. The cast stated that despite having travelled to Indonesia multiple times for work before, it was their first time going to Bali and Yogyakarta. Additional shooting for inserts was held for about ten days after the principal photography is finished.

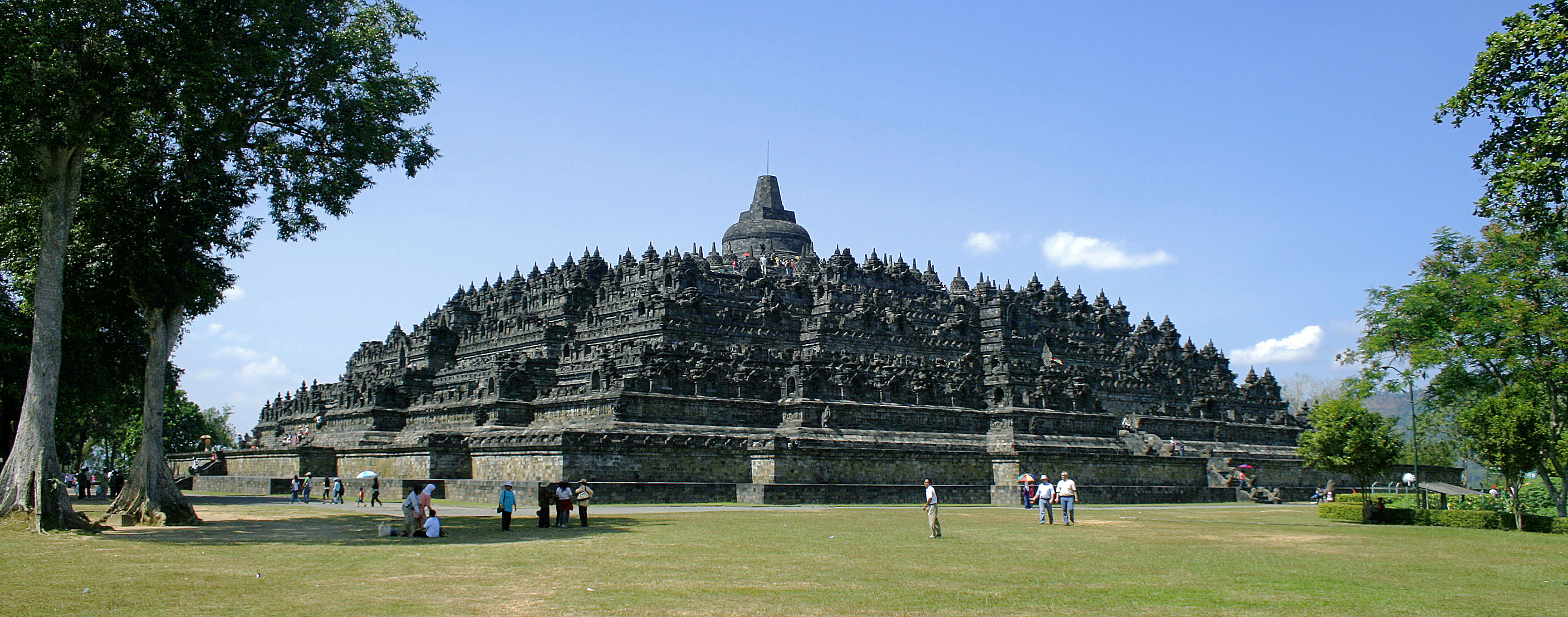
Borobudur temple

A few tourist attractions were featured in the series. They are Borobudur temple, Mount Merapi, Jomblang cave, Parangtritis beach and Prambanan temple. The producer, Kim Ji-seon said that she chose Indonesia as the setting due to the country's tendency of preserving the cultural heritages. She felt that it was a place where the cast could explore their friendship in the past and present, and have the experience of going for a school trip.

The documentary was shot in 4K resolution, making it the first Korean show to air on YouTube to do so. Because of this, the crew had to build new hard drives to accommodate the large size of the raw films. The post-production process took up to six months to finish as it had to go through four major editing processes.

== Soundtrack ==
Analog Trip OST

Soundtrack album by Super Junior (Leeteuk, Shindong, Eunhyuk, Donghae)
- Released: 15 November 2019
- Genre: Soundtrack
- Length: 3:37
- Label: SM Entertainment
- Producer: Dreamus

No.	Title	Lyrics	Music	Length
1.	"Neowa na (Come a little closer)"	Max Changmin	Leeteuk, Peter Hyun, JDUB	3:37
Total length:				3:37

The show's soundtrack was released on 15 November 2019 on several Korean online music store, music streaming services and Super Junior YouTube channel. The music video was released on 27 December 2019. The creation process of the track was shown on episode 12 of Analog Trip.

== Release ==
Analog Trip aired as a YouTube Original and premiered on YouTube Premium on 9 October 2019. All twelve episodes were immediately available for YouTube Premium subscribers, while new episodes were released every subsequent Wednesday for other viewers. The final episode was aired on 1 January 2020. A live stream entitled "Analog Trip After Party 'Apa Kabar! Indonesia'" was broadcast on 22 January 2020 at SMTown Youtube channel, featuring the cast members. In the live stream, they interacted with the audience by playing games, answering viewers' questions that were selected beforehand and giving insights of their experience filming the show. A photo of the cast was uploaded on TVXQ's and Super Junior's social media after the broadcast ended, with the caption expressing thanks to the viewers for watching and supporting the show. The live stream broadcast was posted on 18 February 2020 and listed as episode thirteen of Analog Trip.

The second and seventh episode that were scheduled to be aired on 16 October and 27 November 2019 were both delayed, to respect the death of the casts' label mate, Sulli and actress Goo Hara, who died on 14 October and 24 November 2019, respectively. The second episode aired on the following week, on 23 October while the seventh episode aired together with the eighth episode on 4 December 2019.

== Sequel ==
In the interview held on 30 September 2019, producer Kim Ji-seon said that it was too early to talk about a sequel. She also said that if there is a second season, it might be in a different place like Russia or with different cast. On 4 June 2021, it was announced that a second season starring boyband NCT 127 would be released in the second half of 2021. Its official title was announced as Analog Trip NCT 127: Escape From Magic Island and the first episode was released on 29 October 2021 on YouTube.
