= Kiss the Radio =

South Korean radio show

Kiss The Radio
- Genre: Comedy, talk, music
- Running time: 120 minutes, Every day, 10PM - 12AM KST
- Country of origin: South Korea
- Home station: KBS Cool FM
- Hosted by: Hanhae
- Created by: KBS Cool FM
- Original release: April 26, 2004

Kiss the Radio is a popular radio program broadcast on KBS Cool FM, airing from 22:10 to 00:00 KST every day.

== History ==
Kiss the Radio began broadcasting in 2004 with singer-rapper Danny Ahn of first-generation boy band g.o.d as its first DJ. As a radio show which mainly focuses on K-pop, the hosts have been singers from popular idol groups. From 2006 to October 2016, various members of Super Junior hosted the show, which became known as "Sukira", and were the longest-running hosts. Two weeks after Super Junior's last broadcast, on October 17, 2016 the hosting baton is finally passed to band F.T. Island frontman Lee Hong-gi, therefore making the program being called "Hongkira". Lee Hong-gi stepped down from host position in April 2018 to focus on music and TV broadcast activity. In November 2018, Young K of idol band Day6 hosted from November 2020 through October 12, 2021, during which the program was dubbed "Dekira." From November 1, 2021 to June 4, 2023, the host was Lee Min-hyuk of BtoB, with the program becoming known as "Bikira". On June 5, 2023, it was announced that Young K would return as the main host, beginning June 19.

== List of DJs ==
Year	DJ(s)	Note
April 26, 2004 – August 20, 2006	Danny Ahn	
August 21, 2006 – December 4, 2011	Leeteuk, Eunhyuk	Leeteuk missed 33 broadcasts in April and May 2007 due to injuries sustained in car accident
December 5, 2011 – April 7, 2013	Sungmin, Ryeowook	
April 8, 2013 – April 24, 2016	Ryeowook	
April 25, 2016 – October 2, 2016	Leeteuk	Between October 2 and October 17, a guest hosted the show
October 17, 2016 – April 15, 2018	Lee Hong-gi	
May 14, 2018 – December 16, 2018	Kwak Jin-eon	
December 17, 2018 – November 1, 2020	Park Won	Special DJs Eric Nam and Nucksal hosted the show from November 2–22, 2020
November 23, 2020 – October 10, 2021	Young K (Day6)	Special DJs Seungmin (Stray Kids), Kino (Pentagon), Joochan (Golden Child), and Beomgyu, HueningKai, Yeonjun, Taehyun, and Soobin (Tomorrow x Together) hosted the show from October 11–15, 16–17, 18–24, and 25–31, respectively.
November 1, 2021 – June 4, 2023	Lee Min-hyuk (BtoB)	
June 5, 2023 – June 11, 2023	Jeong Jin-woon	Special DJ for the week of June 5
June 19, 2023 – June 30, 2024	Young K (Day6)	
July 1, 2024 – June 29, 2025	I.M (Monsta X)	
July 7, 2025–present	Hanhae	

== Awards ==
Year	Award	Category	Recipient	Result	Ref.
2004	KBS Entertainment Awards	Radio DJ Award	Danny Ahn	Won	
2015	KBS Entertainment Awards	Radio DJ Award	Ryeowook	Won	
2022	KBS Entertainment Awards	DJ of the Year	Lee Min-hyuk (BtoB)	Won	
2023	KBS Entertainment Awards	DJ of the Year	Young K (Day6)	Won	

== See also ==
- Volume Up (Radio Show)
- KBS 2FM
