= Leeteuk =

South Korean singer-songwriter (born 1983)

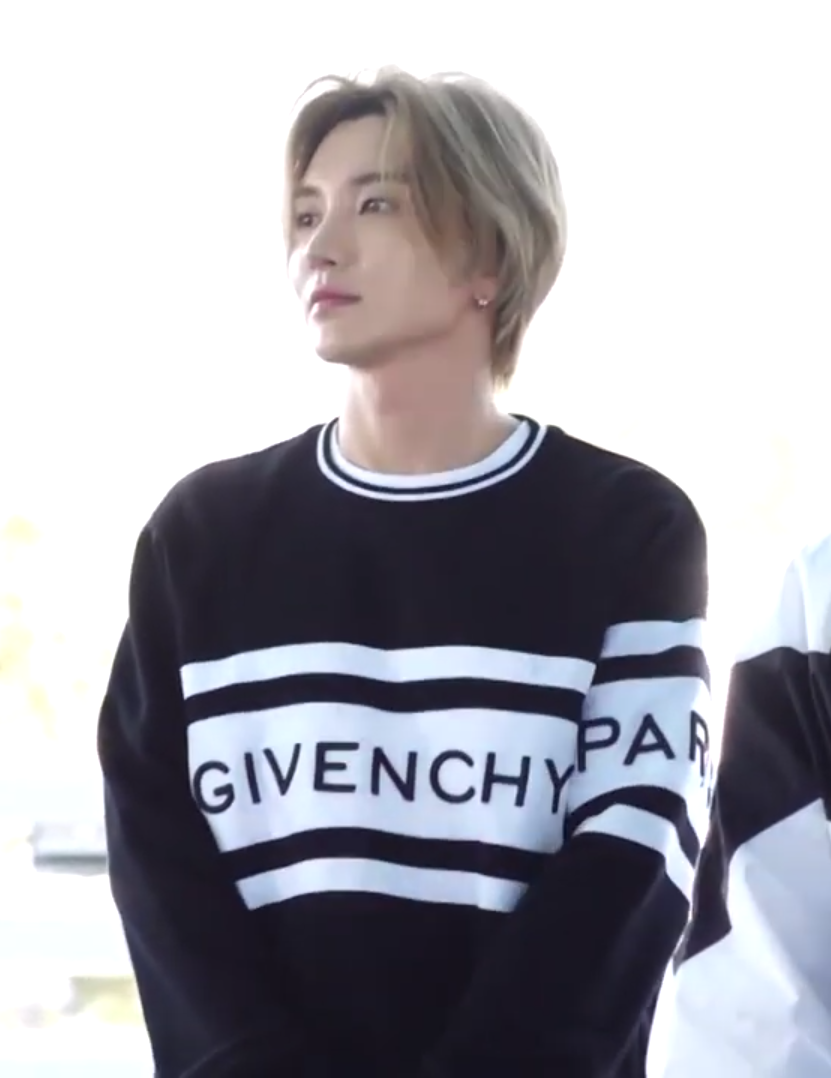
- Leeteuk in November 2019
- Born: Park Jeong-su; July 1, 1983 (age 43); Seoul, South Korea
- Occupations: Singer; songwriter; television presenter; radio personality; actor
- Television: I Can See Your Voice; Idol Star Athletics Championships
- Relatives: Park In-young (sister)
- Musical career
- Genres: K-pop; trot; R&B
- Instrument: Vocals
- Years active: 2005–present
- Labels: Label SJ; S.M.
- Member of: Super Junior; Super Junior-T; Super Junior-H; Super Junior-L.S.S.; SM Town; Super Junior-83z
- Website: Official website

Korean name
- Hangul: 박정수
- Hanja: 朴正洙
- RR: Bak Jeongsu
- MR: Pak Chŏngsu

Stage name
- Hangul: 이특
- Hanja: 利特
- RR: Iteuk
- MR: It'ŭk
- IPA: [itʰɯk̚]

Signature
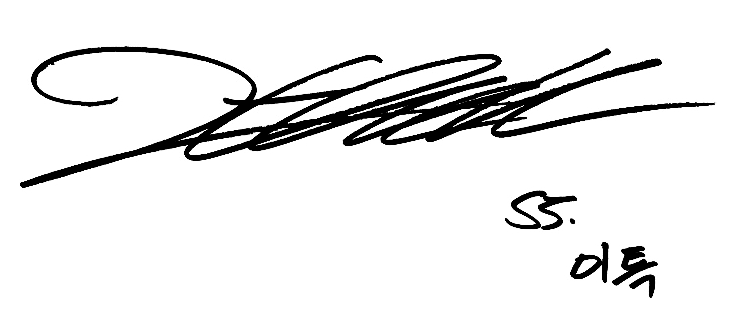

Park Jeong-su (Korean: 박정수; born July 1, 1983), known professionally as Leeteuk (이특; [itʰɯk̚]), is a South Korean singer, songwriter, presenter, radio personality, and actor. He debuted as the leader of the boy band Super Junior in November 2005 and since then has participated in its subgroups Super Junior-T, Super Junior-Happy, Super Junior-L.S.S., and Super Junior-83z. He began his career as a television presenter on the music show M! Countdown. He is best known for his role in presenting Strong Heart, Star King, The Best Cooking Secrets, I Can See Your Voice, and Idol Star Athletics Championships.

He is also a regular figure in the South Korean year-end awards; he has presented Golden Disc Awards three times, Gaon Chart Music Awards six times, and Asia Artist Awards six times. He regularly hosts the Dream Concert and the Asia Song Festival annual concerts.

== Early life ==
Leeteuk was born on July 1, 1983, as the second child of Park Yong-in and Yoo Suk-yeong. His elder sister, Park In-young, is a singer and an actress. His parents divorced in 1998. He has spoken about his parents' relationship publicly on several television shows. He attended Chungwoon University and graduated with a bachelor's degree. He is also an alumnus of Gachon University.

== Career ==
=== 2000–2005: Pre-debut ===
When Leeteuk traveled to Apgujeong-dong to sightsee in early 2000, a talent scout approached him and recommended he audition for SM Entertainment's Starlight Casting System. After several test recordings and performances, he signed with SM Entertainment and became a trainee. In the same year, he appeared as an extra in the drama All About Eve which aired on MBC TV, and briefly modelled for Pepsi in 2002. In 2003, he was put into the five-member boyband Smile with future bandmate Donghae, which aimed to rival the group TVXQ. The project was dropped, and they were put into the rotational group Super Junior along with ten other boys. Being older than the other trainees, Leeteuk became the group's leader.

Leeteuk has explained that he uses a stage name because of his desire to have a name with the same effects as Kangta, and to prevent confusion between veteran actress Park Jung-soo and himself. His stage name Leeteuk, means "special". He previously rejected two of the stage names designated for him by his agency. The agency's then-chairman, Lee Soo-man, called him "a special child" and said the name Leeteuk suited him better.

=== 2005–2012: Debut with Super Junior and sub-groups, MC roles and variety shows ===
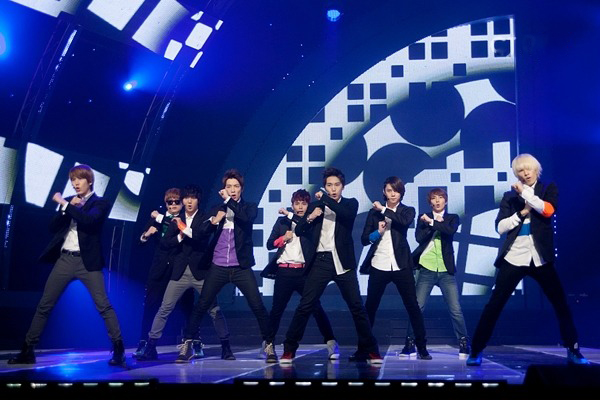
Leeteuk (second from right) performing on stage with Super Junior in 2011

Leeteuk officially debuted as part of the 12-member project group, Super Junior 05 on November 6, 2005, on Seoul Broadcasting System's (SBS) music program Popular Songs, performing their first single, "Twins (Knock Out)". Their debut album SuperJunior05 (Twins) was released a month later on December 5, 2005, and debuted at number three on the monthly MIAK K-pop album charts.

Originally, the band was meant to have rotational line-ups, much like the Japanese girl group Morning Musume, but the idea to form new generations of Super Junior was dropped after fans objected. Following the addition of a thirteenth member, Kyuhyun, the group dropped the suffix "05" and officially became Super Junior. The re-polished group's first CD single "U" was released on June 7, 2006, which was their most successful single until the release of "Sorry, Sorry" in March 2009. In February 2007, Leeteuk was placed in the trot-singing subunit, Super Junior-T. The subunit debuted with the single "Rokkugo", which quickly reached number one on the weekly music chart and held the spot for two consecutive weeks. A year later, Leeteuk became a member of Super Junior-H, a subunit focusing on bright and cheerful music, in contrast to the genre of the songs released by the core group. Besides music, he also participated in Super Junior-centric television shows like Mystery 6 and Full House. He made his first film appearance with Super Junior members in Attack on the Pin-Up Boys in 2007, playing the role of the school's panda mascot.

Apart from Super Junior activities, he has hosted several television shows. In 2005, he became the host of a weekly music show, M! Countdown, his first gig as a host, with bandmates Shindong and Kangin. This eventually landed him his first solo hosting act on the reality show Leeteuk's Love Fighter, which aired on the cable television channel Mnet in 2008. He received praise for his work as a newcomer and received a plaque of appreciation from the show's crew members on his last appearance on the show.

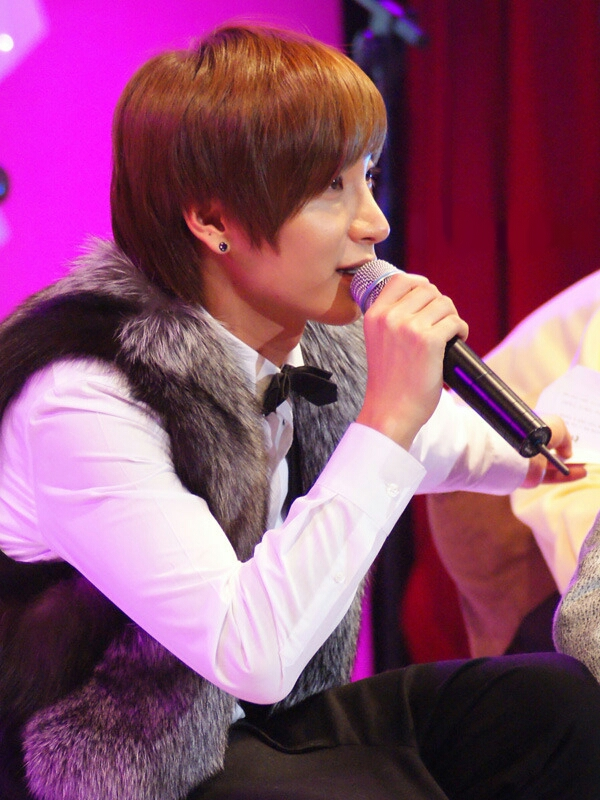
Leeteuk during Kiss the Radio public broadcast in 2009

Leeteuk became a radio DJ for KBS Super Junior's Kiss The Radio (Sukira) with Eunhyuk in August 2006. From March to June 2011, bandmate Yesung temporarily replaced Eunhyuk while he was away doing promotional activities for Super Junior-M's third EP Perfection. Leeteuk left the program in November 2011 because of conflicting work schedules.

Between 2008 and 2009, he hosted several television programs including three variety shows which aired on KBS2; Road Show Quiz Expedition, Challenge! Good Song, and Challenge! Golden Ladder—co-hosting with several senior television presenters such as Jee Seok-jin, Lee Hyuk-jae, Boom, and Kim Shin-young. From 2009 onwards, Leeteuk, Eunhyuk, and Shindong were regular guests on SBS's Strong Heart, where they hosted a special segment, Boom Academy, headed by Boom. In October 2009, when Boom enlisted for mandatory military service, Leeteuk took over his role and the segment's name was changed temporarily to Teukigayo, or Teuk's Academy. As of the April 10, 2012, broadcast, following the change in MCs and the departure of Shindong from Strong Heart, the show was re-vamped with Leeteuk and Eunhyuk billed as two of the 'six-fixed guests'.

In 2010, he appeared as one of many hosts of Waving the Taegukgi, a special program to support the South Korea national football team at the 2010 FIFA World Cup. In the same year, he became the new host for MBC's Enjoy Today, replacing Big Bang's Seungri who left the program to focus on his band's new album. He released the single "Grumbling", a duet with f(x)'s Krystal, through the show. Leeteuk was also the MC for MBC's Love Chaser and SBS's Oh! Brothers, further cementing his position as an emerging host for the country's terrestrial television channels.

Since 2009, he has been a frequent guest on Star King, with other Super Junior members. In 2011, following Kang Ho-dong's retirement from the entertainment industry, Leeteuk and Boom took over as co-hosts of Star King. From September to November, Leeteuk played the role of a father in Hello Baby season 4, a reality-variety show where the cast had to take care of a baby, with girl group Sistar becoming the baby's mothers. Leeteuk also became part of the MBC reality show We Got Married, half of a new on-screen couple, with actress Kang So-ra becoming his on-screen wife. In June 2012, he and Mir were cast as additional hosts to raise the ratings of Jewellery House but the show's rating continued to plummet, and it was cancelled after four episodes.

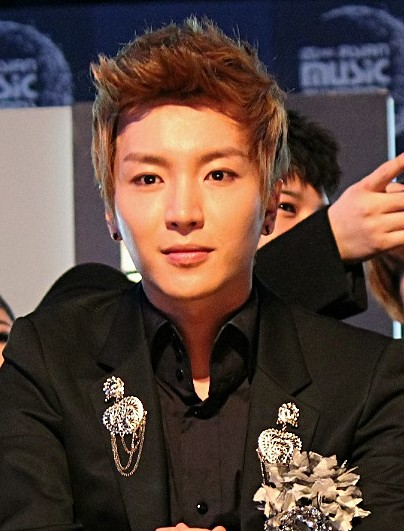
Leeteuk at the Mnet Asian Music Awards in 2011

He appeared in four television dramas in between 2011 and 2012, making cameo appearances as a radio DJ in Dream High, a blind date partner in All My Love For You, a television host in Salamander Guru and The Shadows, and as an extra in My Bittersweet Life to support Kang So-ra, who acted in the leading role. He also became the host of the 2011 Melon Music Awards show, his first year-end awards hosting gig.

=== 2012–2014: SM Town, military enlistment and returning to work ===
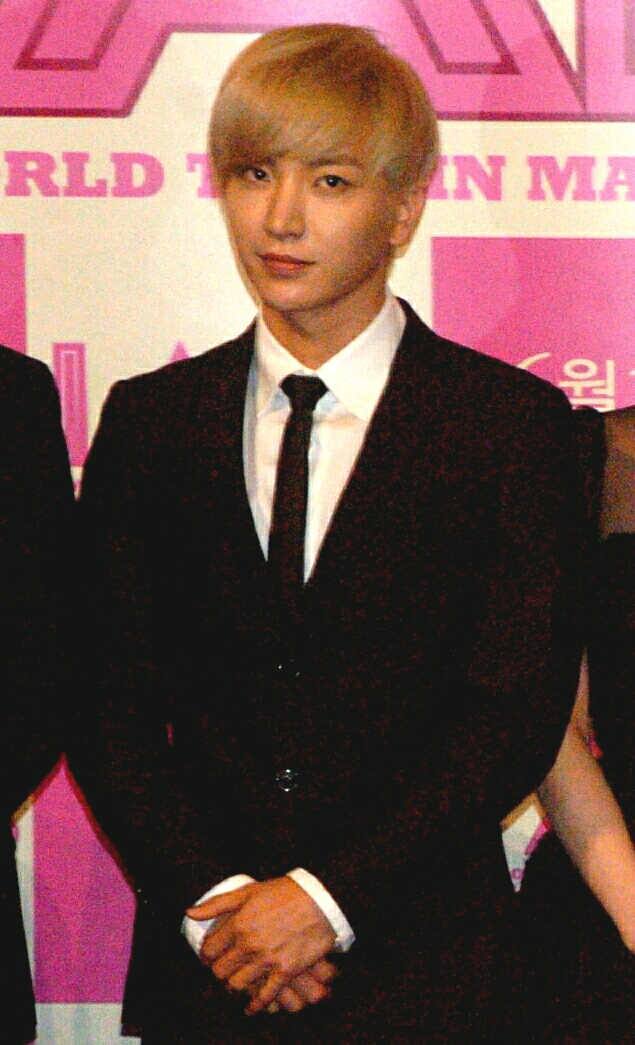
Leeteuk at the I Am. premiere in June 2012

Leeteuk returned to the silver screen by taking part in the documentary film I Am. directed by Choi Jin-sung as a member of SM Town, the collective title for artists signed under SM Entertainment. The film, which documented the singers' journey and experience during the SM Town Live '10 World Tour concert at Madison Square Garden in New York, was theatrically released on June 21, 2012. In July, Leeteuk reunited with his Super Junior bandmates for their sixth studio album, Sexy, Free & Single which was released on July 4, 2012, just over a month after the band's first world tour Super Show 4 was concluded. In the repackaged edition of the album, re-titled Spy, Leeteuk composed "Only U" and co-wrote the lyrics with Donghae. He participated in the concert tour SM Town Live World Tour III which began in May 2012 but did not appear at his supposed last appearance on the tour during its Indonesia leg on September 22. He apologized on his Twitter account the following day, revealing he could not perform with his label mates because of exhaustion and enteritis.

In September 2011, Leeteuk said he planned to enlist for his mandatory military service in 2012. He made his final appearance before enlistment at the Style Icon Awards on October 25, 2012. He took part in a photoshoot documenting the shaving of his hair for the male fashion magazine Geek before his enlistment, and was featured on the cover of its December 2012 issue. On October 30, 2012, he reported to the 306 Reserve Battalion training camp in Uijeongbu, Gyeonggi Province, to undergo five weeks of basic training, followed by active duty for 21 months. He was initially ineligible for active duty following a car crash in 2007 and an aggravated herniated disk, but after receiving treatment he was able to enlist for active duty. Strong Heart belatedly aired a special episode entitled "Goodbye Leeteuk" on November 13 for his departure from the series.

In January 2013, Leeteuk co-starred in the military musical The Promise. It was co-produced by the Republic of Korea's Ministry of National Defense and the Korea Musical Theatre Association to commemorate the 60th anniversary of the signing of the Korean War armistice. It ran from January 9 to 20 at the National Theater of Korea, co-starring actors Ji Hyun-woo, Kim Mu-yeol, Jung Tae-woo, and singers Yoon Hak of Supernova, and Lee Hyun of 8Eight. The musical centers around a group of soldiers who keep a promise made to each other during the Korean War. He won the Newcomer Award at the 7th Daegu International Musical Festival for his role as Miss Kim in the musical. In June 2013, he was selected to be the MC for the 2013 Military Service Award Ceremony, an annual military event.

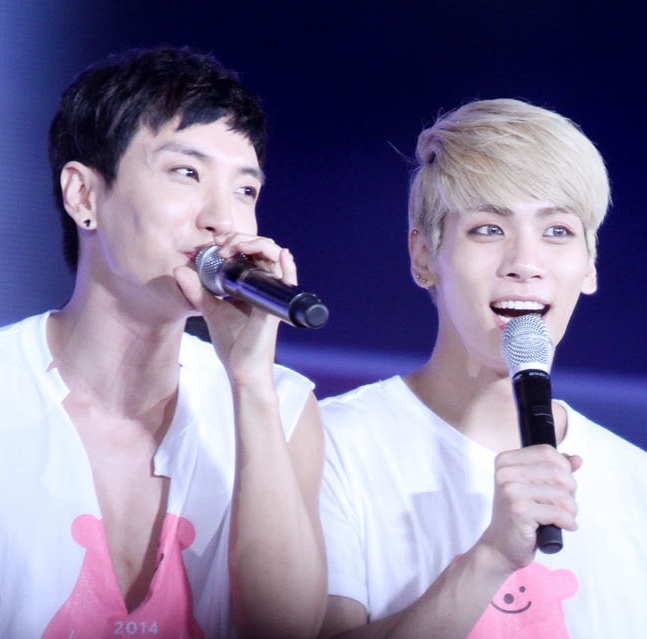
Leeteuk (left) with Jonghyun at the South Korean leg of SM Town Live World Tour IV

Leeteuk completed his military service and was discharged as a sergeant on July 29, 2014. He made his first stage appearance after being discharged at the South Korean leg of SM Town Live World Tour IV concert tour on August 15, 2014, performing "Sorry, Sorry" and "Mr. Simple" with Super Junior. He also returned to the band's line-up for the August performance on Music Bank, marking the first time he, Heechul and Kangin had been together in the line-up since they each completed their military service. He returned as a television presenter becoming the special MC in episode 783 of Inkigayo with Heechul and Lee Yu-bi, standing in for Baekhyun, Suho and Kwanghee who had conflicting work schedules.

=== 2015–2016: I Can See Your Voice, Idol Star Athletics Championships, and established presenter ===
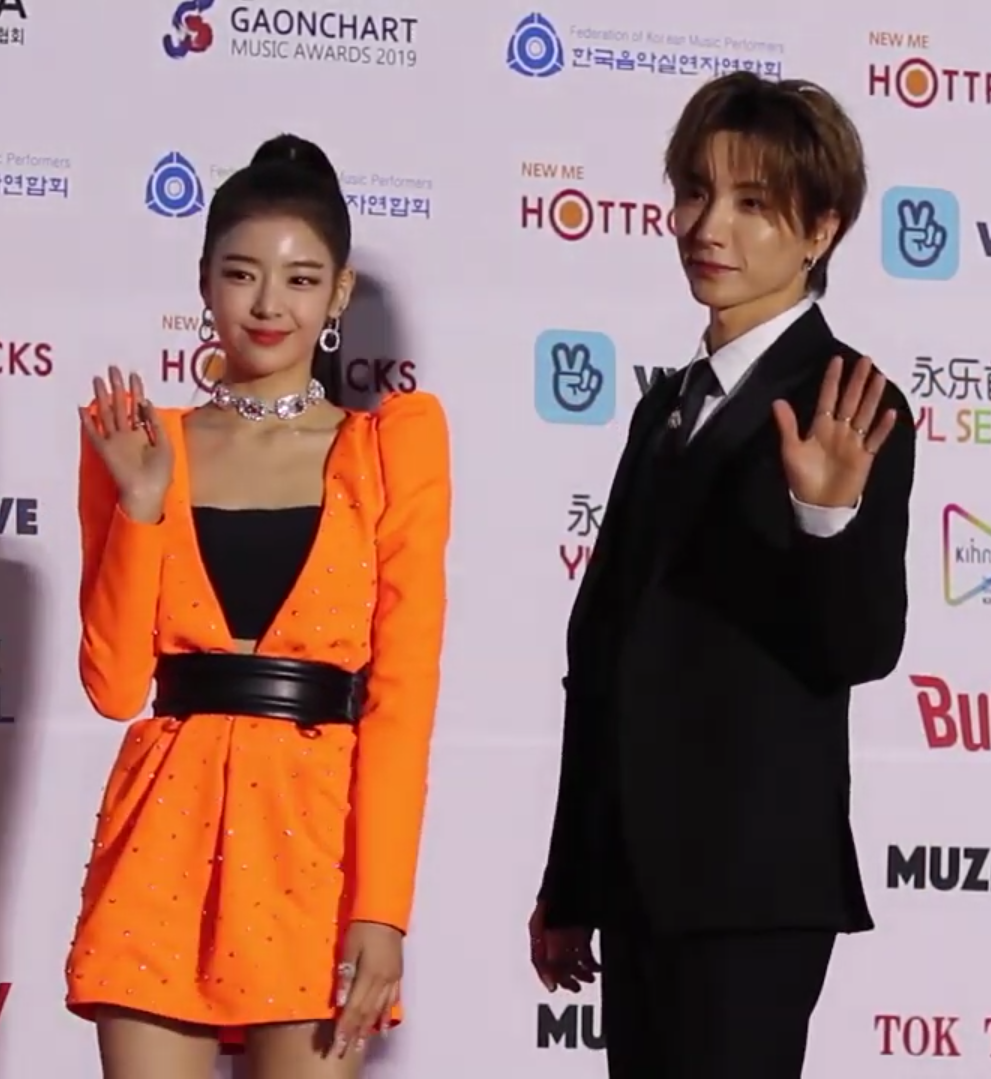
Leeteuk (right) at the 9th Gaon Chart Music Awards red carpet with Itzy's Lia

He hosted three awards ceremonies in January 2015—the 29th Golden Disc Awards with Jun Hyun-moo and Tiffany Young, the 4th Gaon Chart Music Awards with Hyeri, and the 24th Seoul Music Awards, also with Jun Hyun-moo and Soyou. He received praise for his witty remarks during the ceremonies. He was subsequently selected to host the 30th Golden Disc Awards with Jun Hyun-moo and Krystal Jung, and several more editions of the Gaon Chart Music Awards—the 5th edition with Yura, the 6th with Solar, the 7th with Dahyun, the 9th with Itzy's Lia, and the 10th edition, also with Lia.

He began hosting the biannual celebrity sports competition, Idol Star Athletics Championships in February 2015 by commenting on the 2015 Idol Star Athletics Basketball Futsal Archery Championships with Kim Sung-joo, Jun Hyun-moo, Kim Jung-geun and Kwanghee, followed by the 2015 Idol Star Athletics Ssireum Basketball Futsal Archery Championships in September 2015, again with Jun Hyun-moo, Kim Jung-geun and Kwanghee, as well as new co-hosts Jun Jin and Kim Young-chul. He had participated previously as a competitor in the series with other members of Super Junior in the 2010 and 2011 editions, during which he infamously disqualified himself during the 110 metres hurdles race in both competitions. He was a field reporter in the 2012 Swimming Championships. Since hosting the two editions in 2015, Leeteuk had become a fixture in the series along with senior presenter Jun Hyun-moo as he had hosted the program seven more times, once in 2016, twice in 2018, twice in 2019, once in 2020, and the special edition Idol Star Championships: Hall of Fame that aired in 2021 in lieu of the usual competition due to COVID-19 pandemic.

A week after he hosted his first Idol Star Athletics Championships in 2015, he appeared as the presenter on Mnet's new mystery music game show, I Can See Your Voice alongside Yoo Se-yoon and Kim Bum-soo. Kim left the program after three seasons to focus on his music career and was replaced by singer and entertainer Kim Jong-kook. As of 2021, Leeteuk has hosted all eight seasons of the series. When asked about the secret to the series' longevity, he said that although it "has a mild taste" compared to other entertainment shows, it is "full of charm". In a separate interview, he noted that the show's solid format has allowed it to air for a long time. Since its start, the program has grown into a global franchise, spawning shows in different countries and languages, including the UK and the US versions.

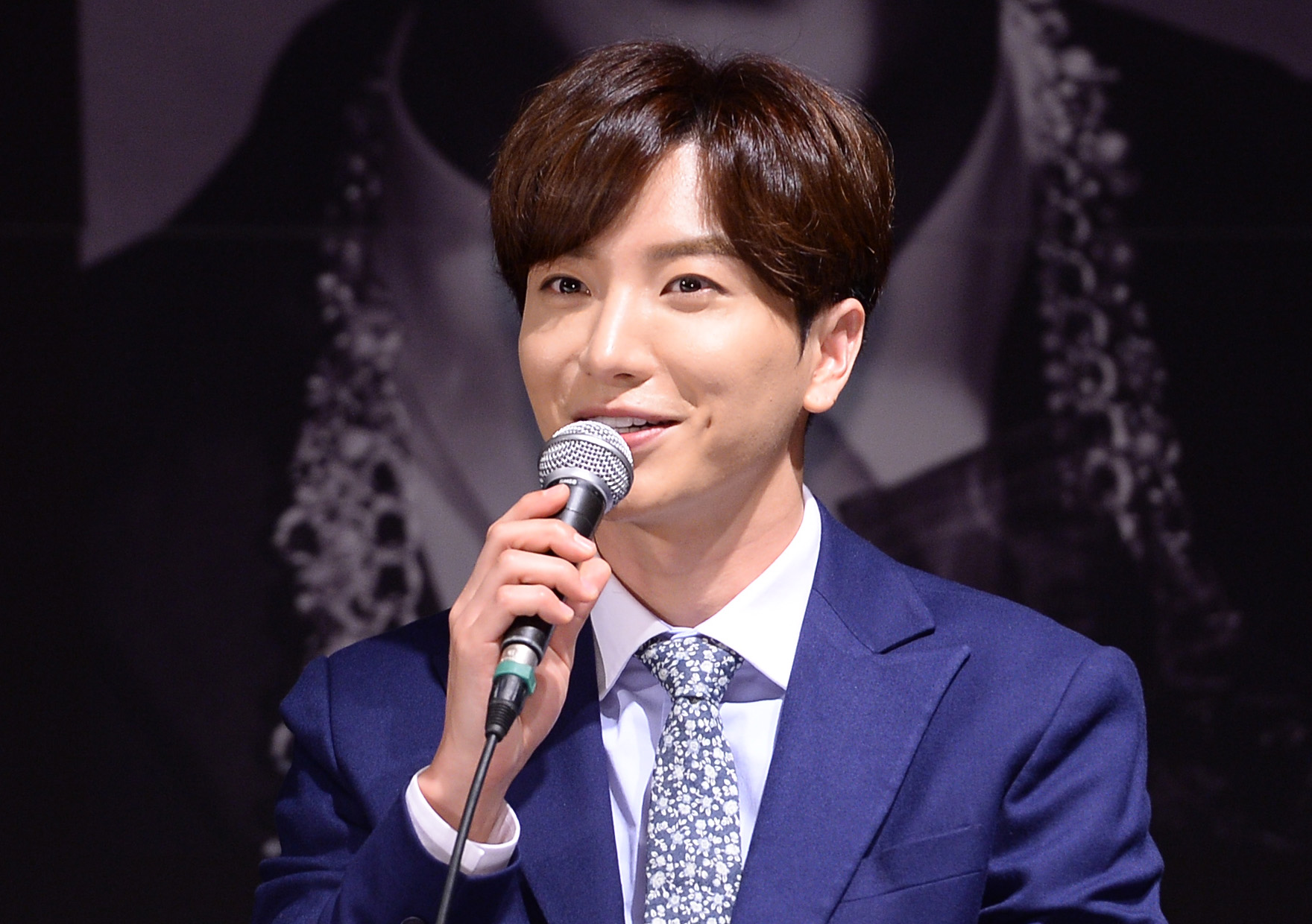
Leeteuk during the press conference for Devil in 2015

He appeared as host of several other programs in 2015 like Match Made in Heaven Returns with Lee Hwi-jae, a reboot of 2002 program Kang Ho-dong's Match Made in Heaven, White Swan with Lee Seung-yeon, The Mickey Mouse Club with SM Rookies as the Mouseketeers, and episode 782 of Music Bank, filling in for Park Seo-joon. He returned to the set of Star King, first as a special host for episode 400 in February 2015, then as a regular host beginning in April 2015, until its cancellation in August 2016. He made a cameo appearance as a music show host in episode 5 of television drama Persevere, Goo Hae-ra which aired in March 2015. That year, he participated in his first travel series Super Junior's One Fine Day with bandmates Eunhyuk and Donghae, followed by The Friends in Switzerland with Ryeowook, both of which were filmed in Switzerland. His band released a compilation album Devil in July 2015, followed by its repackaged version Magic in September. Leeteuk wrote the track "Sarang♥" on Magic, and sang it as a duet with Heechul. It was the band's last release before going on a hiatus because most of the band members were carrying out their mandatory military services. Leeteuk returned to hosting.

In 2016, he co-hosted the entertainment programs Hidden Camera Shot Battle with Lee Kyung-kyu and Noh Hong-chul, The Birth of a Song with Jung Jae-hyung and San E, and Reform Show with Lee Hwi-jae and Kwanghee. He made a return as radio DJ of Sukira in April 2016, replacing Ryeowook who had enlisted in the military. He celebrated the 10th anniversary of the radio show in August before leaving the program for good in October 2016. He took part in the reality-documentary show Law of the Jungle, filming for Law of The Jungle in Papua New Guinea. Despite it being his first time participating in an outdoor entertainment program, the program's director, Park Joong-won, praised his effort, commenting that he had worked hard during the filming process, and adapts easily for an urban person. He presented Star Show 360, season 2 of Please Take Care of My Vanity, and Idol Party, as well as participating in the variety show Lucky Race. He was slated to co-host Star Coming, a South Korea-China joint program in late 2016, but its production was abruptly cancelled following rising tensions between the two countries. His roles in the industry earned him the top three spots on the Idol MC of the Year list published by My Daily news portal. The journalist in charge of the list, Lee Seung-gil, praised him for his unique ability to make his guests or his co-hosts to stand out and considered him a "professional MC".

He moved out of his comfort zone of studio work by becoming the MC of 7 First Kisses' press conference, and the preview screening of the documentary film See-Saw. On top of that, he became a public speaker through SM Entertainment's cultural lecture series, The Moment, which featured lecture collaborations between SM artists and experts in various fields with the theme "Healing the wounded 2016 and welcoming the year 2017 happily": partnering with chef Lee Won-il for the lecture entitled "The Single Man's Lifestyle" in February 2016; with a mental health specialist, Yang Jae-jin for "Healing Counseling for Young People" in May; with Kim Ji-yoon, director of the Institute for Good Relationships for "Love and Romance" in September; and "Leeteuk's Unique Day with Webtoon Writer Lee Jong-beom" in December. In June 2016, he collaborated with Suho, Kassy and songwriter Cho Young-soo in a song titled "My Hero", part of SM Entertainment's music project SM Station, as a tribute to South Korean Olympians past and present in honor of the 2016 Summer Olympics. Leeteuk embarked on his first solo Asia fanmeeting tour, Star;Teuk, making stops in Shanghai, China, in September, and Taipei, Taiwan, in December 2016.

=== 2017–present: The Best Cooking Secrets, home shopping, reality shows and overseas works ===
Leeteuk became the host of The Best Cooking Secrets, the longest running cooking show in South Korea, in January 2017, replacing ZE:A's Kwanghee, who enlisted in the military. His first episode as host was broadcast on the Educational Broadcasting System (EBS) on January 30, 2017. He filled in for Lee Soo-geun and BoA as the host of episode 10 of Singderella and episode 6 of Produce 101 Season 2, respectively. He took part in several variety shows throughout the year including Hard Workers, as a courier in We Have Delivery, as a detective in Sherlock's Room, and as a celebrity mentor in Fearless Guys. As an actor, he made a cameo appearance as a radio DJ in episode 7 of the television drama Borg Mom, which aired on October 27, 2017.

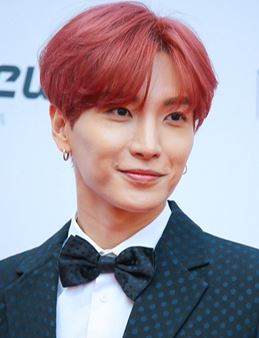
Leeteuk at the Asia Artist Awards in 2017

He became one of the special hosts with other members of Super Junior of the television home shopping program Super Market which aired on CJ O Shopping in November 2017, becoming the first idol to do so, . He hosted six concerts in 2017—the K-Drama Festa in Pyeongchang, a concert event to promote Pyeongchang ahead of the 2018 Winter Olympics; the Going Together Concert in April, a concert held jointly by the Ministry of Culture, Sports and Tourism of Vietnam and the Embassy of South Korea in Vietnam to commemorate the 25th anniversary of the diplomatic relations between the two countries; the 2017 Dream Concert in June; the 2017 Incheon Airport Sky Festival K-pop Concert in September, a part of the annual outdoor music festival held by the Incheon International Airport; the 2017 Asia Song Festival with Jackson Wang in September; and the 2017 Dream Concert in Pyeongchang in November, which was a special edition of Dream Concert held as part of the Cultural Olympiad to accompany the 2018 Winter Olympics in Pyeongchang.

Leeteuk joined Super Junior as part of the main cast of Super TV, which aired on the new television channel XtvN from January 28 until April 13, 2018. The show was immediately renewed and the second season aired from June 7 until August 23, 2018. He wrote the single "Super Duper" for Super Junior, and it became the 50th single of the project SM Station Season 2 after it was released on March 23, 2018. The song was later inserted into Super Junior eighth repackage album, Replay. He returned with his band for the second time to Super Market and sold out facemasks during the hour they were on air. After his appearances on the program, he was cast in the variety show Sell to Return, a collaboration with Thai and Malaysian home shopping channels.

He played a supporting role in the commercial web drama Secret Queen Makers in June 2018. The branded entertainment was well-received and has been watched over a hundred million times since its release. In August 2018, he joined the cast and hosted the second season of Real Life Men and Women, a program that looks into everyday life of celebrities and compares the differences between those of men and women. He hosted of the 2018 edition of Quiz on Korea alongside Sam Okyere in September, hosted the 2018 Asia Song Festival on October 2 and October 3, and the 1st Korea Popular Music Awards (KPMA) with Jin Se-yeon in December 2018.

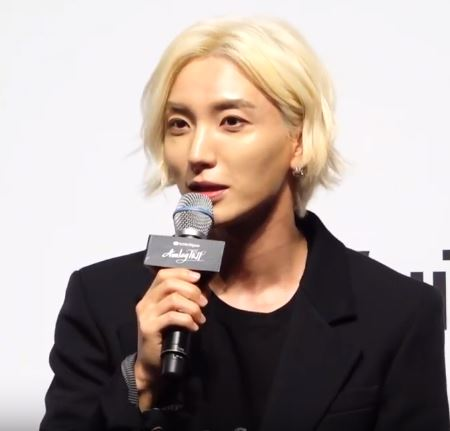
Leeteuk during Analog Trip press conference in September 2019

In January 2019, he appeared as a special host on the twelfth episode of the reality show Under Nineteen, filling in for the regular host Kim So-hyun, who had a conflicting work schedule. He also hosted the final episode of the show with Kim, which was broadcast live on February 9, 2019. He participated in a few programs which were filmed overseas for the next few months. In May, he appeared in a Japanese travelling show Leeteuk's Solo Travel, which showcased his trip to the Kagoshima Prefecture in Kyushu. From May to July 2019, Leeteuk hosted a Thailand-based talk show Beauty No. 9, which focused on Korean beauty products. His hosting act was well received by the locals and media. He starred in a YouTube Original series Analog Trip with fellow band members, Eunhyuk, Donghae and Shindong, as well as TVXQ's Yunho and Changmin in September 2019. The travel documentary which showcased the band members' close relationships was shot in Jogjakarta, Indonesia. He is credited as one of the composers of the show's soundtrack, "Come a Little Closer".

He was cast as a host for JTBC music show Melody Bookstore in October. He wrote the soundtrack for the show, "This Is Me", which is sung by Sunwoo Jung-a and Suran. In October 2019, he became the host of the music talk show Hidden Track, which focuses on introducing artists' lesser known songs. JTBC and KT produced the show jointly. It aired live on Olleh TV for eight weeks, beginning on October 2, 2019. The show was renewed for a second season in March 2020, and a third in April 2021. Leeteuk reprised his role in both seasons. He hosted the 4th Asia Artist Awards on November 26, 2019, which was held at Mỹ Đình National Stadium in Vietnam.

In August 2019, it was announced that Leeteuk would publish a cookbook targeted at single-person households. He became the first idol to do so. It was published on January 20, 2020. He appeared as a talent manager in Favorite Entertainment, a reality show aimed to produce a trot idol group, and began hosting the Japanese variety show Super Junior's Idol vs Idol with bandmate Yesung in July 2020. In the same month, he left The Best Cooking Secrets after being its host for more than three years. Following his departure, he appeared in several food related shows, as a chef in Home Cooking Live in August, as a host of Neighbourhood Two-Top in November, and as a cooking disciple in Soo-mi's Side Dishes between December 2020 to February 2021. He became a mentor for North Korean and overseas competitors in the reality competition People of Trot beginning in September 2020.

In October, he hosted the 2020 Miss Korea beauty pageant, which aired online because of the COVID-19 pandemic in South Korea. Many events were broadcast online instead of being held in public because of social distancing rules implemented during the pandemic, which include the banning of public gatherings. Leeteuk hosted events such as the K-Pop Global Donation Concert World Is One, a charity concert organised by the Munhwa Broadcasting Corporation and World Vision Korea for their COVID-19 pandemic relief fund, the 26th Dream Concert, the 2020 Taekwondo Performance in Seoul, and the DMZ Concert, a part of the 2020 Live in DMZ festival—a peace festival which was held at Imjingak near the Korean Demilitarized Zone (DMZ). He returned to radio hosting Party B, which aired on the web radio Naver NOW, from September to December 2020.

On July 5, 2023, Super Junior-L.S.S., a sub-unit group consisting of Super Junior bandmates Leeteuk, Siwon, and Shindong, debuted with their first Japanese single "Close The Shutter". The trio later made their official Korean debut on January 22, 2024 with the single "Suit Up".

== Personal life ==
=== Car accident ===
On April 19, 2007, almost two months after Super Junior-T's release of their first single "Rokkugo", Leeteuk was seriously injured in a car accident with Shindong, Eunhyuk, Kyuhyun, and two managers. Returning home after a recording of the radio show Super Junior Kiss the Radio, they were on the highway when the front left tire burst as the driver was switching lanes. The van ran into the guard rail on the driver's side and skidded for about 30 metres. At some point, the momentum caused the van to flip over on its right side.

While Shindong and Eunhyuk suffered minor injuries, Leeteuk and Kyuhyun sustained more serious injuries, which required both to be hospitalised. Leeteuk had glass shards embedded in his back and above his eyes, requiring over 170 stitches. He was discharged from the hospital on April 30, 2007. Because of the accident, Leeteuk made only a minor appearance in Super Junior's debut big-screen production, Attack on the Pin-Up Boys in 2007. He was credited as the panda mascot at the end of the film, although it was later confirmed that it had been Ryeowook who portrayed it throughout most of the film.

=== Death of father and grandparents ===
On January 6, 2014, while Leeteuk was in the military, news broke out that his father, Park Yong-in, and grandparents, Park Hyun-seok and Chun Kyung-tae, were found dead in their home. SM initially released a statement saying that the trio had died in a car accident. It was later revealed it had been a murder-suicide, with Park Yong-in strangling his parents and then hanging himself. A note left near the bodies read, "I will take my parents with me." The news reported that Park had been dealing with depression for a long time. He was also struggling with financial problems on top of having to take care of both his parents who were suffering from dementia. According to the police, Park had planned to admit his parents to a nursing home the next day but changed his mind. They concluded that it is highly likely that Park blamed himself for being unable to continue taking care of his parents. The funeral was held on January 8, with the Super Junior members in attendance. Leeteuk, who was granted emergency leave, resumed his mandatory military service on January 11, 2014, and was discharged on July 29, 2014.

=== Military service ===
Leeteuk enlisted for his mandatory military service as an active-duty soldier on October 30, 2012, entering the Army's 306th Replacement Battalion in Uijeongbu, Gyeonggi Province. Contemporary reports noted that a 2007 traffic accident had aggravated a pre-existing herniated disc, but that he underwent continued treatment before enlisting. In 2014, Leeteuk stated that he had originally received a supplementary-service classification but chose active-duty service partly because of public scrutiny and his position as the leader of Super Junior.

He completed five weeks of basic training at the 9th Infantry Division's recruit training center. During his training, he was selected as the company commander trainee. After completing his training in December, he was assigned to the 1st Infantry Division.

In January 2013, Leeteuk appeared in the military musical The Promise, which was jointly produced by the Ministry of National Defense, the Army and the Korea Musical Theatre Association to commemorate the 60th anniversary of the Korean Armistice Agreement. He was subsequently selected to serve in the Ministry of National Defense's public-relations support unit, whose members were commonly known as entertainment soldiers. The Ministry of National Defense abolished the entertainment-soldier system on July 18, 2013, after concluding that repeated controversies had damaged the military's image and public trust.

As part of the resulting reassignment of the unit's remaining personnel, Leeteuk's military occupational specialty was changed to rifleman and he was transferred to the 12th Infantry Division on August 2.

While serving with the 12th Infantry Division, Leeteuk was granted four nights and five days of bereavement leave following the deaths of his father and paternal grandparents on January 6, 2014. After attending their funeral, he returned to his unit on January 11 and resumed his service.

Leeteuk completed 21 months of active-duty service and was discharged from the 12th Infantry Division on July 29, 2014. During an October 2014 appearance on Radio Star, he acknowledged that he had at times regretted choosing active-duty service after experiencing several hardships in succession. He also recalled being transferred to another unit while holding the rank of private first class.

== Discography ==
=== Singles ===
List of collaboration singles with selected chart positions, showing year released and album name
Title	Year	Peak chart positions	Album
Title	Year	KOR	Album
"해주세요 (Please)" with Shindong	2011	—	SSN Carpe diem Trot Project
"투정 (Grumbling)" with Krystal	2011	46	SSN Carpe diem Ballad Project
"아이스크림 (Ice cream)" with JOO	2011	21	Non-album single
"크게 라디오를 켜고 (Turn on the Radio Loudly)" with The Koxx, Lee Hyun-woo, Choi Kang-hee, Danny Ahn and Eunhyuk	2011	—	KBS Cool FM 46th anniversary
"나의 영웅 (My Hero)" with Suho, Kassy, and Cho Yeong-su	2016	177	SM Station Season 1
"The Cure" with Kangta, BoA, U-Know, Taeyeon, Onew, Suho, Irene, Taeyong, Mark, Kun and Karina	2022	— (Note: Did not enter Circle Digital Chart but charted on Circle Download Chart and peaked at number 39)	2022 Winter SM Town: SMCU Palace
"Thank You" with Kangta, BoA, U-Know Yunho, Max Changmin, Ryeowook, Taeyeon, Hyoyeon, Key, Minho, Suho, Chanyeol, Seulgi, Joy, Doyoung, Ten, Mark, Jeno, Haechan, Yangyang, Karina, Winter, Wonbin, Sohee, Sion, Yushi	2025	— (Note: Did not enter Circle Digital Chart but charted on Circle Download Chart and peaked at number 96)	2025 SM Town: The Culture, the Future
"—" denotes releases that did not chart or were not released in that region.

=== Soundtrack ===
List of soundtrack appearance with selected chart positions, showing year released and album name
Title	Year	Peak chart positions	Album
Title	Year	KOR	Album
"Bravo" with Key	2012	—	History of a Salaryman OST
"Mr. Simple & I Got A Boy" with Luna, Suho, Xiumin and Jo Eun	2016	—	School OZ Hologram Musical OST
"—" denotes releases that did not chart or were not released in that region.

=== Other appearances ===
List of non-single guest appearances, showing year released and album name
Title	Year	Album
"좋은 사람 있으면 소개시켜줘 (A Perfect Match)" Yoona feat. Leeteuk and Shindong	2011	Girls' Generation 1st Asia Tour: Into the New World
"Coming Home"	2021	Star
"—" denotes releases that did not chart or were not released in that region.

== Lyrics and composition ==
List of songs written by Leeteuk (Note: Adapted from Korea Music Copyright Association, unless stated otherwise.)
Year	Song	Artist	Album	Lyrics		Music	
Year	Song	Artist	Album	Credited	With	Credited	With
2007	"I Am"	Super Junior	Don't Don		Greg Lynch; Sungmin; Eunhyuk; Donghae		—N/a
2007	"Leeteuk Logo 1"	Super Junior	Kiss The Radio		—N/a		—
2007	"Leeteuk Logo 2"	Super Junior	Kiss The Radio		—N/a		—
2009	"Be With You"	Yesung, Sungmin	Sang Geun's Wish		Sungmin		—N/a
2010	"All My Heart"	Super Junior	No Other		—N/a		Henry Lau
2011	"Oops!!"	Super Junior featuring f(x)	A-Cha		Misfit; Shindong; William Fuller; Eunhyuk; Donghae; Heechul; Karl Engstrom		—N/a
2011	"Andante"	Super Junior	A-Cha		—N/a		Kim Kyu-won; Henry Lau
2011	"Grumbling"	Leeteuk and Krystal	SSN Carpe Diem Ballad Project		Krystal		—N/a
2012	"Only U"	Super Junior	Spy		Donghae		Lee Jae-myoung
2015	"You Got It"	Super Junior (Note: Sung by Leeteuk, Heechul, Yesung, Eunhyuk and Donghae)	Magic	(Note: credited as Park Jung-soo)	Eunhyuk; Cho Jun-young; Heechul; Ray McCullough; Jeremy Reeves; Romulus Ray; Jonathan James Yip; Malcolm McDaniel		—N/a
2015	"Sarang♥"	Super Junior (Note: Sung by Leeteuk and Heechul)	Magic		—N/a		Jinoo; Peter Hyun
2018	"Super Duper"	Super Junior	Replay SM Station Season 2		Peter Hyun; Young Sky		Peter Hyun; Young Sky
2019	"No Drama"	Super Junior (Note: Sung by Leeteuk, Yesung, Eunhyuk, Ryeowook and Kyuhyun)	Time Slip		Peter Hyun; Young Sky		Peter Hyun; Young Sky
2019	"This Is Me"	Sunwoo Jung-a and Suran	Melody Bookstore Part 6 OST		Peter Hyun; Young Sky		Peter Hyun; Young Sky
2019	"Come a Little Closer"	Super Junior (Note: Sung by Donghae, Eunhyuk, Leeteuk and Shindong)	Analog Trip OST		J-Dub; Peter Hyun; Max Changmin		J-Dub; Peter Hyun
2020	"Blue"	Super Junior (Note: Sung by Leeteuk, Yesung, Shindong and Eunhyuk)	I Think U		—N/a		Young Sky
2020	"Hairspray"	Super Junior	SJ World Tour Super Show 8		Peter Hyun; Young Sky		Peter Hyun; Young Sky
2020	"Uriege (The Melody)"	Super Junior	The Renaissance		Yesung; Min Young-jae; Niclas Kings; Didrik Thott; Andy Dilbert (Note: Credited as Andy Love in the album photobook)		—N/a
2021	"Coming Home"	Leeteuk	Star		—N/a		Peter Hyun
2022	"Latte"	Leeteuk, Shindong and Siwon	Unreleased		Kinsha; Peter Hyun; Young Sky		Peter Hyun; Young Sky
2023	"Ceremony"	Super Junior-L.S.S.	Let's Standing Show		Peter Hyun; Young Sky; Fujiwara Masaki		Peter Hyun; Young Sky
2024	"C'mon (Jilleo)"	Super Junior-L.S.S.	Non-album single		Kinsha; Peter Hyun; Young Sky		Peter Hyun; Young Sky
2025	"Pon Pon"	Super Junior-L.S.S.	Non-album single		—N/a		AllThou; Peter; Young Sky

== Bibliography ==
- Iteugui teukbyeolhan siksa (이특의 특별한 식사) / Lee Teuk Cook Book - simple, easy recipes. Seoul: Geurigo Chaek, 2020. ISBN 9791196772031 and ISBN 1196772037; OCLC 1143741513. The title alone is in English as well as Korean.
- Super Junior Lìtè qīnshǒu zuò! Tè gē dì měiwèi liàolǐ mìjué (Super Junior利特親手做！特哥的美味料理祕訣) / Lee Teuk Cook Book - simple, easy recipes. Translated by Zhang Yuqi. Taiwan: China Times Publishing Company, 2020. ISBN 978-957-13-8268-5; OCLC 1195520860. Chinese version of Iteugui teukbyeolhan siksa with alternate cover and preface.

== Awards and nominations ==
Year	Award	Category	Nominated work	Result	Ref
2009	3rd SBS Entertainment Awards	Best Newcomer Award (Variety category)	Star King and Strong Heart	Won	
2011	5th SBS Entertainment Awards	Excellence Award (Talk Show category)	Strong Heart	Won	
2011	5th SBS Entertainment Awards	Netizen Popularity Award	Star King	Nominated	
2012	6th Mnet 20's Choice Awards	20's Variety Star	—N/a	Won	
2012	12th MBC Entertainment Awards	Popularity Award (Variety category)	We Got Married (season 3)	Won	
2012	6th SBS Entertainment Awards	Best Entertainer Award (Talk Show category)	Strong Heart	Won	
2013	7th Daegu International Musical Festival	Newcomer Award	The Promise	Won	
2020	2nd The Fact Music Awards	Fan N Star Choice Awards Individual	—N/a	Nominated	
2025	60th Golden Bell Awards	Best Host in a Reality or Game Show	Chef’s Unexpected Landing: Hakka Kitchen	Nominated	
