= Black Suit =

2017 single by Super Junior

Single by Super Junior

from the album Play
- Language: Korean
- Released: November 6, 2017
- Recorded: 2017
- Studio: Doobdoob, South Korea; The Vibe, South Korea
- Genre: Dance-pop
- Length: 3:21
- Label: SM; Label SJ; Genie
- Composers: Martin Hoberg Hedegaard; Coach & Sendo
- Lyricists: Lee Seu-ran; Jo Yoon-kyung; Oh Min-joo; Lim Jeong-hyo; ESBEE
- Producers: Coach & Sendo; Martin Hoberg Hedegaard

Super Junior singles chronology
| "One More Chance" (2017) | "Black Suit" (2017) | "On and On" (2017) |

Music video
- "Black Suit" on YouTube

"Black Suit" is a song recorded by South Korean boy band Super Junior for their album Play (2017). It was released as the album's title track on November 6, 2017, by SM Entertainment, Label SJ and Genie following the revelation of multiple video teasers. The song was composed by Martin Hoberg Hedegaard and Coach & Sendo, while its lyrics was penned by Lee Seu-ran, Jo Yoon-kyung, Oh Min-joo, Lim Jeong-hyo and ESBEE. The song told the story of a man who steal people's heart while wearing a black suit, inspired by the character Lupin.

A commercial success, the song peaked at number 23 on Gaon Digital Chart and was downloaded over 92,000 times in the month of its release in South Korea. An accompanying music video depicting a heist conducted by the band members during an auction of a black suit, directed by Rigend Film, premiered the same day as the song's release. The visual won the Myx Music Awards 2018 in International Music Video of The Year category. A staple in Super Junior's live concert, they had performed the song many times including at three of their headlining concert tours; Super Show 7, Super Show 8: Infinite Time and Super Show 9: Road.

== Background and release ==
In July 2015, Super Junior released the compilation album Devil to commemorate their ten years debut anniversary. A repackaged edition of the album, retitled as Magic, was released in September 2015. They underwent hiatus shortly afterwards due to most of the band members were undergoing their mandatory military enlistment. In January 2017, Star News reported that Super Junior are going to make a comeback later that year. In September 2017, Sports Dong-a reported that Super Junior would release a new album on their 12th debut anniversary on November 6, 2017, two years since the release of Devil. However, Label SJ denied the rumour, saying that although the band was preparing for an album, its release date has not been decided. At midnight of September 27, a photo containing the cryptic word "D-40" and "SJ Returns" was posted on Super Junior's social media accounts. The band's website also began a countdown to November 6, 2017, the date of their 12th anniversary.

On October 9, 2017, SJ Returns, a reality program that documented the band's 120 days of preparatory period leading up to the release of their upcoming album started airing on Naver TV and V Live. "Black Suit" was first introduced in episodes 17 and 18 of SJ Returns which aired on October 19, 2017, as one of the five songs shortlisted by their agency's A&R team as the lead single candidate of the upcoming album after conducting blind test involving over 100 demo tapes. An anonymous voting held among themselves resulted in the song being picked as the album's lead single. Super Junior released several video teasers for the track starting November 1, 2017. "Black Suit" and its music video was premiered in front of journalists, before it was released on the evening of November 6, 2017. The single featured the voice of seven out of eleven members of Super Junior, namely Leeteuk, Heechul, Yesung, Shindong, Eunhyuk, Siwon, and Donghae.

== Composition and lyrics ==
"Black Suit"
Excerpt from the song's chorus, showcasing the use of brass instruments.

"Black Suit" is a dance-pop song written with emphasise on synth and brass instruments. It is composed by the youngest winner of Danish version of X-Factor, Martin Hedegaard, and Coach & Sendo. It is composed in the key of F minor, with the tempo of 122 beats per minute. Its composition was described as a restrained melody played on top of a swing brass rhythm. Characterised by its cheerful melody and addictive chorus, the song reflected the K-pop trend during the moment of its release.

"Black Suit" lyrics told the story of a man in a black suit who stole hearts in the fleeting moment in the dark, inspired by the character Lupin. It was penned by Lee Seu-ran, Jo Yoon-kyung, Oh Min-joo, Lim Jeong-hyo and ESBEE. The band explained that the song portrayed the group's existing bright image but with addition of their maturity. Heechul described it as a dance song, while Yesung introduced it as a song that excites people.

== Choreography ==
The song's dance routine was choreographed by Tobias Ellehammer. Band member Eunhyuk said that "simple and easy movements have became Super Junior's signature performance", thus the song's choreography focused on movements that can be easily copied. The song's choreography was first performed by Super Junior on episode 100 of Knowing Bros, which aired on November 4, 2017, ahead of the song's official release. Heechul originally was not planning to join the band's line-up for "Black Suit" performance due to the worsening condition of his leg injury originated from a car accident in 2006 but decided to fill in the gap left by the band members who are serving in the army. The song was specially choreographed to take into account of his condition so that he would only appear at the latter part of the song. They are supported by backup dancers in their performances due to the band being reduced to half its size.

== Critical reception ==
Tamar Herman from Billboard described the song as "both dynamic and playful". She further said the song's release "proves that the aging group can still pull off a powerful K-pop dance track". The Korea Herald writer, Hong Dam-young, on her review said "[Super Junior's] powerful vocals blend well into the song's pulsating swing vibe". She commented on the similarity between the song and their previous single "Devil" (2015), concluding that the band "does not dare experiment with a new genre". She also opined that the song "may be a one-time hit that will not likely stand the test of time". Shin Mi-kyung, writing for Osen, said the song is "full of freewheeling energy", and despite its similarity to the band's previous releases, she found the "tension of the song [to be] attractive". Hwang Hye-jin from Newsen praised the song's arrangement, saying that it "starts with a simple sensation and gradually becomes powerful". Shin Mi-rae from MBN also commented on the song's composition, saying that "the melody of the chorus captivates the ears with its addictiveness that makes it imprinted on you the moment you hear it." News publication Ten Asia described the song as a result of the band "pursuing a more sophisticated style" yet still "showing some of their music colours".

== Commercial performance ==
"Black Suit" debuted and peaked at number 23 on the Gaon Digital Chart for the week of November 5–11, 2017, following its release. It stayed for three weeks on the chart, positioning at numbers 60 and 85 on the following weeks. The song also reached number 27 on the monthly Gaon Digital Chart, in the chart published for the month of November 2017. It reached number 51 on the monthly Gaon Download Chart, in the chart published for the month of November 2017. It was downloaded over 92,000 times during the month.

In Japan, the song entered the Billboard Japan Hot 100 at number 81 on the chart issue dated November 15, 2017. It was their only Korean-language song to enter the chart. The song debuted and peaked at number 8 on the World Digital Song Sales chart for the week of November 25, 2017. It stayed for three weeks on the chart, positioning at number 9 and 18 the following weeks.

== Music video ==
The music video of Black Suit, directed by Rigend Film is released on November 6, 2017, the same day as the single's release. It featured the band members plotting a heist to steal an expensive black suit in an auction, however the suit was stolen due to unforeseen circumstances. The visual started with a chaotic scene during an auction, then it flashed back to the day the band members meet to plan the heist. Returning to present day, the lights went out in the middle of the auction and the black suit disappeared and was stolen by a woman. Although the band members appeared frustrated during the event, they appeared to be celebrating in the aftermath, hinting that the woman is part of their group and the operation is a success.

The members of the band play various roles in the music video; Leeteuk as the auction host, Heechul as an investor, Yesung as a courier, Shindong as a rich man, Eunhyuk as an appraiser, Siwon as a client agent, and Donghae as a bodyguard. Siwon's part in the music video was retained despite his non-participation in the album promotion. The music video was filmed over a few days in September at a set located at Namyangju, Gyeonggi-do. The visual won the International Music Video of the Year award in Myx Music Awards 2018, making Super Junior the only Korean artist to win an award in the ceremony that year.

== Promotion and live performance ==
During promotion of Play in 2017, Super Junior performed "Black Suit" on music programs including M! Countdown on November 9, on Music Bank on November 10 and November 17, and on Inkigayo on November 12 and November 19, 2017. The live performances only featured six out of seven available band members as Siwon decided to step back from participating in the album's promotional activity. In an episode that aired on January 31, 2020, the band appeared on I Can See Your Voice season 7 as a musical guest. They sang "Black Suit" with the episode's winner. They performed the song on Indonesian television networks, Transmedia 20th anniversary celebration in December 2021.

They also performed the song on year-end awards ceremonies; the 2017 Mnet Asian Music Awards, the 27th Seoul Music Awards, the 2019 KKBox Music Awards, the 2020 Asia Artist Awards, and at the 2021 The Fact Music Awards. They performed the song on their world tour Super Show 7 and its encore Super Show 7S, where they performed while wearing flashy suits. The opening night of Super Show 7 on December 15, 2017, marked Siwon's first performance of the song with Super Junior. Super Junior also performed the song on their subsequent headlining tours Super Show 8: Infinite Time (2019–2020), and Super Show 9: Road (2022–2023). The song was performed for the first time with Ryeowook in the band's line-up in October 2018, during their showcase for One More Time, while Kyuhyun first performed the song with the band in SM Town Live 2019 in Tokyo in August 2019, both after they were discharged from their military service.

They also performed the song on music festivals such as the K-Wave 2 Music Festival in January 2018, the KCON 2018 New York, at the 2019 K-World Festa, and at KAMP LA 2022. They performed the song on online concert Beyond the Super Show in 2020, at the Super Junior Japan Special Event 2022: Return of the King, and at the affiliated concert tours SM Town Live 2022: SMCU Express, and SM Town Live 2023: SMCU Palace at Kwangya.

== Credits and personnel ==
Credits are adapted from the liner notes of Replay:

Studio

- Doobdoob Studio – recording
- The Vibe Studio – recording
- S.M. Concert Hall Studio – mixing
- Sterling Sound – mastering

Personnel

- Label SJ – executive producer
- SM Entertainment – executive supervisor
- Tak Young-jun – producer
- Super Junior – producer, vocals
- Yoo Young-jin – music and sound supervisor
- Lee Seu-ran – lyrics
- Jo Yoon-kyung – lyrics
- Oh Min-joo – lyrics
- Lim Jeong-hyo – lyrics
- ESBEE – lyrics
- Martin Hoberg Hedegaard – composition, arrangement
- Coach & Sendo – composition, arrangement
- Butterfly – vocal director
- Joo Chan-yang – background vocals
- Hwang Seong-jae – background vocals, digital editing
- Kim Dong-ha – trumpet, brass arrangement, brass conductor
- Jang Hyo-seok – tenor saxophone
- Lee Dae-nam – baritone saxophone
- Lee Han-jin – trombone
- Kim Hyun-gon – recording
- Ahn Chang-gyu – recording
- Kwak Jeong-shin – recording
- Jeong Mo-yeon – recording
- Seo Mi-rae – digital editing
- Nam Koong-jin – mixing
- Chris Gehringer – mastering

== Charts ==
Chart performance for "Black Suit"
| Chart (2017) | Peak position |
|---|---|
| South Korea (Gaon Digital Chart) | 23 |
| Japan (Billboard Japan Hot 100) | 81 |
| US World Digital Song Sales (Billboard) | 8 |

== Japanese version ==
"Black Suit"

Single by Super Junior
- Language: Japanese
- A-side: "On and On"
- Released: December 6, 2017
- Studio: Doobdoob, South Korea; The Vibe, South Korea
- Genre: Dance-pop
- Length: 3:22
- Label: Avex Trax; SM Japan
- Composers: Martin Hoberg Hedegaard; Coach & Sendo
- Lyricist: MEG.ME

Super Junior Japanese singles chronology
| "Devil" / "Magic" (2015) | "On and On" / "Black Suit" (2017) | "One More Time" (2018) |

The Japanese version of the song was released as the B-side track to "On and On" on December 6, 2017, a month after its Korean release. The single was released as fan exclusive, and was only sold on the Japanese fanclub official shop. The song was added as a track on the band's Japanese compilation album, Star which was released in January 2021.

== Release history ==
Release dates and formats for "Black Suit"
| Region | Date | Version | Format(s) | Label(s) | Ref. |
|---|---|---|---|---|---|
| South Korea | November 6, 2017 | Korean | Digital download; streaming | SM; Label SJ; Genie | |
| Various | November 6, 2017 | Korean | Digital download; streaming | SM; Label SJ | |
| Japan | December 6, 2017 | Japanese | CD; DVD | Avex Trax; SM Japan | |
| Various | December 6, 2017 | Japanese | Digital download; streaming | Avex Trax; SM Japan | |
