= Explorer (EP) =

- Digital cover

EP by Eunhyuk
- Released: January 27, 2025
- Recorded: 2024
- Studios: 821 Sound (Seoul); InGrid (Seoul); Warner (Seoul)
- Genres: Hip hop; new jack swing
- Length: 21:23
- Language: Korean
- Labels: ODE; Dreamus
- Producers: Super Junior-D&E; Avenue 52; Lyre; Shin Kung; Sqvare; Vincenzo

Eunhyuk chronology
| Explorer (2025) | Timescape (2025) |

Singles from Explorer
- 1. "Up n Down" Released: January 27, 2025

Explorer is the debut EP by South Korean singer and rapper Eunhyuk, a member of the boy band Super Junior and its subgroup Super Junior-D&E. It was released on January 27, 2025, ODE Entertainment and distributed by Dreamus. The EP consists of seven tracks with "Up n Down" serving as its lead single.

== Background ==
On July 23, 2023, SM Entertainment announced that Donghae, Eunhyuk, and Kyuhyun have decided not to renew their contract with the agency, but they will continue group activities with Super Junior under SM. On September 1, Super Junior-D&E announced that they have established their own agency called ODE Entertainment where the duo will serve as the Co-CEOs.

2024 was a productive year for the subgroup, with the release of EPs 606 in March, You&Me in July, and Inevitable in October. The duo also embarked on their first world tour concert "Eclipse" from September until January 2025.

Eunhyuk returned as a member Super Junior for SM Town Live concert in Seoul on January 12, where he revealed that he will release an EP on January 27. ODE made an announcement the following day that Eunhyuk will release his first EP Explorer on January 27.

The old-school themed track list was revealed on January 16, revealing all the seven tracks and the producers involved in the EP's production. The teaser photos were revealed on January 20 and 21, adopting a retro theme. The highlight medley was uploaded on January 24.

The EP and its lead single were released on January 27. Through the agency Eunhyuk said, "It feels like I'm debuting again after 20 years."

== Composition ==
The EP features old-school hip-hop and new jack swing genres that Eunhyuk grew up with.

The EP begins with a Eunhyuk-written song, "A-yo" to introduce the EP in a short and intense way. The second song is the lead single "Up n Down", which is described as a new jack swing song with funky synthesizer sounds reminiscent of the 1990s with the lyrics encouraging the listeners to enjoy the moment. The third song "Trap" is a new jack swing song with a synth and drum sound.

"You & I" is a dance-pop song with disco-style guitar and bass with guest vocals from Super Junior bandmate Cho Kyu-hyun. "Step By Step" is a modern take on new jack swing with its lyrics depicting taking small steps at a time. "Second Chances" is a medium-tempo pop song with a hopeful message. The EP concludes with R&B special track "Empty" which features Donghae as the lyricist and the composer, narrating the longing of a departing lover and reliving memories together.

== Chart performance ==
The EP debuted and peaked at No. 1 of the Circle Chart.

== Promotions ==
Eunhyuk appeared on Inkigayo where he performed "Up n Down" on February 2. On February 7, he performed "Up n Down" in Music Bank and jokingly stated that he would retire if the song went at number one, which it eventually did.

== Track listing ==
Explorer track listing
| No. | Title | Lyrics | Music | Arrangement | Length |
|---|---|---|---|---|---|
| 1. | "A-yo" | Lee Hyuk-jae | Vincenzo; Shin Kung; Rokstaxil | Vincenzo; Shin Kung | 1:06 |
| 2. | "Up n Down" | Kim Yang-ha | Vincenzo; Shin Kung; Cyrus Villanueva | Vincenzo; Shin Kung | 3:13 |
| 3. | "Trap" | Ellie Suh | Avenue 52; Sqvare; Hymax | Avenue 52; Sqvare; Hymax | 3:13 |
| 4. | "You & I" (featuring Cho Kyu-hyun) | Yoo Eun-mi | Avenue 52; Sqvare; Lyre; Scott Bruzenak; Oscar Free | Lyre; Scott Bruzenak; Oscar Free | 4:02 |
| 5. | "Step By Step" | Ko Hyeon-jeong; Jung Boy; Yoon Na-ra; Dahlia Kim | Melange; DRD; Chrizmatic | Melange; DRD | 3:06 |
| 6. | "Second Chances" | Jiwon (153/Joombas) | Avenue 52; Sqvare; Joacim Persson; Johan Alkenäs | Joacim Persson; Johan Alkenäs | 3:35 |
| 7. | "Empty" (있을까; iss-eulkka; lit. 'Could it be?') | Lee Dong-hae; Rokstaxil | Lee Dong-hae; Rokstaxil; Jelly; 17 | Jelly; 17 | 3:06 |
| Total length: | | | | | 21:23 |

== Accolades ==
Music show awards
| Song | Program | Date | Rank | Ref. |
|---|---|---|---|---|
| "Up n Down" | Music Bank (KBS) | February 7, 2025 | 1 | |

== Credits and personnel ==
Credits adapted from the EP's liner notes.

Studio

- 821 Sound Studio – recording
- Warner Music Korea – recording
- InGrid Studio – recording, mixing
- GLAB Studios – mixing
- Klang Studio – mixing
- Kobee Studio – mixing
- MadMix – mixing
- Supremo Studio – mixing
- 821 Sound Mastering – mastering

Personnel

- ODE Entertainment – executive producer and executive supervisor
- Super Junior-D&E – producer
- Back Koo-young – choreography
- J.Black – choreography
- Vincenzo – producer, composition, arrangement (1, 2), mixing
- Shin Kung – producer, composition, arrangement (1, 2)
- Lee Hyuk-jae – vocals, lyrics (1)
- Rokstaxil – composition (1, 7), lyrics (7)
- Kim Yang-ha – lyrics (2)
- Cyrus Villanueva – composition (2)
- Avenue 52 – producer, composition, arrangement (3, 4, 6)
- Sqvare – producer (3, 4), composition (3, 4), arrangement (3)
- Hymax – producer, composition, arrangement (3)
- Ellie Suh – lyrics (3)
- Lyre – producer, composition, arrangement (4)
- Scott Bruzenak – producer, composition, arrangement (4)
- Oscar Free – producer, composition, arrangement (4)
- Yoo Eun-mi – lyrics (4)
- Melange – producer, composition, arrangement (5)
- DRD – producer, composition, arrangement (5)
- Chrizmatic – composition (5)
- Ko Hyeon-jeong – lyrics (5)
- Jung Boy – lyrics (5)
- Yoon Na-ra – lyrics (5)
- Kim Dahlia – lyrics (5)
- Joachim Persson – producer, composition, arrangement (6)
- Johan Alkenäs – producer, composition, arrangement (6)
- Jiwon – lyrics (6)
- Jelly – producer, composition, arrangement (7)
- 17 – producer, composition, arrangement (7)
- Lee Dong-hae – lyrics (7)
- Kim Min-hee – recording
- Ahn Chang-gyu – recording
- Jeong Eun-kyung – recording
- Kobee – mixing
- Kwon Yoon-hwan – mixing
- Kwon Nam-woo – mastering
  - Yoo Eun-jin – mastering assistant

== Charts ==
=== Weekly chart ===
Chart performance for Explorer
| Chart (2025) | Peak position |
|---|---|
| South Korean Albums (Circle) | 1 |

=== Monthly chart ===
Monthly chart performance for Explorer
| Chart (2025) | Peak position |
|---|---|
| South Korean Albums (Circle) | 14 |

== Sales ==
| Region | Sales |
|---|---|
| South Korea | 67,908 |

== Release history ==
Release history for Explorer
| Region | Date | Format | Label | Ref. |
|---|---|---|---|---|
| Various | January 27, 2025 | Digital download; streaming | ODE; Dreamus | |
| South Korea | January 31, 2025 | CD | ODE; Dreamus | |
