= Super Show 7 =

2017–19 concert tour by Super Junior

- World tour by Super Junior
- Promotional poster for the tour
- Associated albums: Play; Replay; One More Time
- Start date: December 15, 2017
- End date: July 12, 2019
- Legs: 3
- No. of shows: 21
- Guests: Leslie Grace; Play-N-Skillz; Rossa

Super Junior concert chronology
- Super Camp (2015–16); Super Show 7 (2017–19); Super Show 8: Infinite Time (2019–20)

Super Show 7 was the third world concert tour and seventh tour overall by South Korean boy band Super Junior, in support of their eighth studio album, Play. The world tour commenced with three shows in Seoul from December 15 to 17, 2017 and hit a total of 120 concerts for its Super Show series.

This tour marks the return of members Siwon, Eunhyuk and Donghae, who had been away serving two years of mandatory military service. Ryeowook joined the tour in November 2018 following his military discharge.

== Concerts ==
The tour was announced on November 10, 2017, after Super Junior started the promotion for their eighth studio album, Play. Tickets for the December 16–17 "Super Show 7 Concert Tour" in Seoul, went on sale on November 21, 2017, and were sold out in nine minutes.

Later, the group added one more concert on December 15, 2017, due to high demand. The tickets went on sale on November 26. The concert on December 15, 2017, marked the 120th Super Show concert in the Super Show series.

The concert in Singapore was announced on December 1, by ONE Production. It had been two years since Super Junior had previously performed in Singapore. The Bangkok show on January 28 was played to 10,000 people and was sold out in five minutes.

== Setlist ==
South Korea (Opening Weekend)

Opening VCR

- "Black Suit"
- "Scene Stealer"
- "Mamacita"

First MENT

- "Shirt"

VCR #2

- "Girlfriend"
- "This is Love"
- "Too Late"
- "It's You"

VCR #3

- "One More Chance"
- "Memories"
- "Stars Appear..."

VCR #4

- Super Rangers (Power Rangers)
- "Rokkugo"

BAND INTRODUCTION AND LIVE PERFORMANCE (TWINS)

- "Twins (Knock Out)" (Band Ver.)

Second MENT

- "Runaway" (Band Ver.)
- "Too Many Beautiful Girls" (Band Ver.)
- "Magic" (Band Ver.)

VCR #5

- "Let's Dance" (Band Ver.)

Club Medley Mix
"Charm of Life"

- "On & On" (Band Ver.)
- "Super Duper" (Band Ver.)
- "Sorry, Sorry" (Band Ver.)
- "Mr. Simple" (Band Ver.)
- "Bonamana" (Band Ver.)

VCR #6

- "I do" (Band Ver.)
- "The Lucky Ones" (Band Ver.)
- "Shining Star" (Band Ver.)

Encore

- "Good Day for a Good Day"
- "Devil" (Band Ver.)
- "Spin Up!" (Band Ver.)
- "Now" (Band Ver.)

Ending MENT

- "Miracle" (Band Ver.)

Ending VCR

Latin America (Mexico)

Opening VCR

- "Black Suit"
- "Scene Stealer"
- "Mamacita"

First MENT

- "Shirt"
- "Girlfriend"
- "This is Love"
- "It's You"
- "One More Chance"
- "Memories"
- "Stars Appear..."
- "Lo Siento (ft. Leslie Grace, Play-N-Skillz)"

Second MENT

- "Dile" (Leslie Grace)
- "Duro y Suave" (Leslie Grace)
- "Si Una Vez" (Leslie Grace, Play-N-Skillz)
- "Runaway"
- "Rokkugo"
- "Sorry, Sorry"
- "Mr. Simple"
- "Bonamana"
- "I do"
- "Shining Star"

Encore

- "Good Day for a Good Day"
- "Magic"
- Miracle

Ending MENT

Asia

Opening VCR

- "Black Suit"
- "Scene Stealer"
- "Mamacita" (with Ryeowook solo entrance)

First MENT

- "Shirt"

VCR #2

- "Animals"
- "It's You"
- "One More Time (Otra Vez)" (JPN ver. with Korean choruses - TOKYO)

VCR #3

- "Aishiterutte Ienai" (Yesung solo) (TOKYO ONLY)
- "One More Chance"
- "The Little Prince" (Ryeowook solo)

VCR #4

- "'Bout You" (D&E)
- "Oppa, Oppa" (D&E)
- "Can You Feel It?" (D&E)

Second MENT

- "Runaway"
- "Too Many Beautiful Girls"
- "★BAMBINA★"

VCR #5

- "On & On" (JPN)
- "Super Duper"
- "Sorry, Sorry"
- "Mr. Simple"
- "Bonamana"

VCR #6

- "I do"
- "Make You Smile" (JPN)
- "Shining Star"

Encore

- "Devil"
- "Wow! Wow!! Wow!!!" (JPN)
- "Now"
South Korea (Encore)
- "Black Suit"
- "Mamacita"
- "Superman"
- "Don't Don"

MENT

- "Mr. Simple
- "One More Time (Otra Vez)
- "It's You"
- "U"
- "It has to be You" (Yesung solo)
- "Drunk in the Morning" (Ryeowook solo)
- "At Gwanghwamun" (KRY)
- "'Bout You" (Donghae solo)
- "Lost" (Donghae Solo)
- "'Bout You" (D&E)
- "Oppa Oppa" (D&E)
- "Can You Feel it?" (D&E)
- "Runaway"
- "Rokkugo"
- "Pajama Party"
- "Sweet Dream" (Heechul solo ft. Min Kyunghoon)
- "Siwon"
- "Cheer Man" (Shindong solo ft. UV)
- "Super Duper"
- "Rockatar"
- "Let's Dance"
- "Illusion" (Eunhyuk solo)
- "Sorry, Sorry" (Super Show 6 Version)
- "Bonamana" (Super Show 4 Version)
- "Marry Me" (Leeteuk solo)
- "I do"
- "You are the One"
- "Devil"
- "Wow! Wow!! Wow!!!"
- "Miracle (Band Ver.)"

== Tour dates ==
List of concert dates
Date	City	Country	Venue	Attendance
December 15, 2017	Seoul	South Korea	Jamsil Arena	25,000
December 16, 2017	Seoul	South Korea	Jamsil Arena	25,000
December 17, 2017	Seoul	South Korea	Jamsil Arena	25,000
January 27, 2018	Singapore		Singapore Indoor Stadium	7,500
January 28, 2018	Bangkok	Thailand	Impact Arena	10,000
February 10, 2018	Hong Kong	China	AsiaWorld–Arena	—
March 31, 2018	Taipei	Taiwan	Taipei Arena	22,000
April 1, 2018	Taipei	Taiwan	Taipei Arena	22,000
April 20, 2018	Buenos Aires	Argentina	Luna Park	35,000
April 22, 2018	Lima	Peru	Jockey Club del Perú	35,000
April 24, 2018	Santiago	Chile	Movistar Arena	35,000
April 27, 2018	Mexico City	Mexico	Mexico City Arena	35,000
May 12, 2018	Macau	China	Cotai Arena	—
June 30, 2018	Pasay	Philippines	SM Mall of Asia Arena	—
November 11, 2018	Bangkok	Thailand	Impact Challenger Hall	10,000
November 30, 2018	Tokyo	Japan	Tokyo Dome	100,000
December 1, 2018	Tokyo	Japan	Tokyo Dome	100,000
March 2, 2019	Seoul	South Korea	KSPO Dome	15,000
March 3, 2019	Seoul	South Korea	KSPO Dome	15,000
June 15, 2019	Jakarta	Indonesia	Indonesia Convention Exhibition	—
July 12, 2019	Jeddah	Saudi Arabia	King Abdullah Sports City Arena	15,000
Total				N/A

== Personnel ==
- Artists: Super Junior members Leeteuk, Heechul, Yesung, Shindong, Eunhyuk, Donghae, Siwon and Ryeowook (only from November Bangkok stop); Leslie Grace (Latin America); Play-N-Skillz (Peru, Chile and Mexico); Rossa (Indonesia)
- Tour organizer: SM Entertainment
- Tour promoter: Dream Maker Entercom

== Awards ==
Awards
Year	Organization	Award	Result	Ref.
2018	44th People's Choice Awards	The Concert Tour of 2018	Nominated	
2019	Premios Luces	Best Concert of the Year	Won	
