= Drunk on Love (EP) =

- Digital cover

EP by Ryeowook
- Released: January 2, 2019
- Recorded: 2018–2019
- Studio: lalala (Seoul); MonoTree (Seoul); Prelude (Seoul); Seoul (Seoul)
- Genre: R&B; pop ballad; Lounge
- Length: 27:06
- Language: Korean
- Label: SM; Label SJ; Dreamus
- Producer: Tak Young-jun; Basim; Jeppe Federspiel

Ryeowook chronology
The Little Prince (2016)	Drunk on Love (2019)	A Wild Rose (2022)

Singles from Drunk on Love
- 1. "One and Only" Released: November 28, 2018; 2. "I'm Not Over You" Released: January 2, 2019

Music video
- "One and Only" on YouTube
- "I'm Not Over You" on YouTube

Drunk on Love is the second extended play by South Korean singer, Ryeowook. It was released by SM Entertainment and Label SJ, and, distributed by Dreamus on January 2, 2019. The EP features seven tracks in total, including the lead single, "I'm Not Over You".

== Background ==
After enlisting for his mandatory military service on October 11, 2016, Ryeowook was discharged on July 10, 2018. He joined Super Junior's fifth world tour Super Show 7 starting from November 2018's Bangkok stop, and his vocals was featured in their first extended play, One More Time.

On November 27, Label SJ announced that Ryeowook will release his second mini album on December 10, this marked Ryeowook's solo release in two years. Pre-release single "One and Only" was released alongside the announcement.

However, the date of the EP's release was pushed back to January 2, 2019, after Ryeowook was diagnosed with Influenza A after returning from Bangkok.

On January 2, 2019, the EP was officially released alongside the music video of its lead single, "I'm Not Over You".

== Composition ==
Drunk on Love has a variety of genres in each song. Ballad tracks were present in lead single "I'm Not Over You", which features a gentle piano melody and melancholic strings in the buildup for its orchestral climax, and the last track, "The 2nd Story". "One and Only" leans toward lounge music. "Something Good", and "Sugar" have noticeable jazz flavors with their own respective identities. "Without You" has an R&B-esque sound with Latin pop melody.

In an interview with The Korea Times, Ryeowook recounted that he spent a lot of time thinking what musical genre of path he's going to pursue for the album during his conscription. He also stated that he would try writing and composing more songs by himself for his solo work and expressed his wishes for Drunk on Love to serve as the turning point for his solo career.

== Promotions ==
Ryeowook promoted the EP with a performance of "I'm Not Over You" in Music Bank on January 4.

== Track listing ==
Drunk on Love track listing
No.	Title	Lyrics	Music	Arrangement	Length
1.	"I'm Not Over You" (너에게; Neoege; 'To you')	danke (lalala studio); Jeon Bo-young	Sean Alexander; Andreas Öberg; Darden Smith; Darren Smith	Hwang Sung-jae; AVENUE 52; Andreas Öberg; ProducerDNA; Darren Smith	4:37
2.	"One and Only" (우리의 거리; Uriui geori; 'Our street')	Lee Seu-ran	Stefano Langone; Afsheen (musician); Josh Cumbee	NONFICTION	3:38
3.	"Drunk in the Morning" (취해; Chwihae; 'Drunk')	Jo Yoon-kyung; Kim Ryeo-wook; Cheon Songi	Dyson; Justin Gray; Boots	Jake K	3:30
4.	"Without You"	Bang Hye-hyun	CODE 9; Basim; Jeppe Federspiel	Basim; Jeppe Federspiel	3:26
5.	"Something Good"	Shin Agnes	Andy Love; David Amber	David Amber	3:32
6.	"Sugar"	G-High	G-High	G-High	3:32
7.	"The 2nd Story" (파란별; Paranbyeol; 'Blue star' (Special track))	Kim Ryeo-wook	Kang Min-goo; Kim Ryeo-wook	Shoulder Gang; Kang Min-goo	4:46
Total length:					27:06

== Critical reception ==
Writing for the South China Morning Post, Chris Gillett praised Ryeowook's vocals and the variety of genre available but criticized the album as "too safe" instead of trying to stand out.

== Charts ==
Chart performance for Drunk on Love
Chart (2019)	Peak position
South Korean Albums (Gaon)	2

== Release history ==
Release history for Drunk on Love
Region	Date	Format	Label
South Korea	January 2, 2019	CD	SM; Label SJ; Dreamus
Various	January 2, 2019	Digital download; streaming	SM; Label SJ
