= Inevitable (Super Junior-D&E EP) =

2024 extended play by Super Junior-D&E

- Digital cover

EP by Super Junior-D&E
- Released: September 25, 2024
- Recorded: 2024
- Studio: Ingrid Studio (Seoul); Vibe Music Studio606 (Seoul)
- Genre: Hip hop; rock; synth-pop
- Length: 18:33
- Language: Korean; English
- Label: ODE; Dreamus
- Producer: Super Junior-D&E

Super Junior-D&E chronology
You & Me (2024)	Inevitable (2024)

Singles from Inevitable
- 1. "Go High" Released: September 25, 2024

Music video
- "Go High" on YouTube

Repackaged edition cover
- Digital cover

Singles from Inevitable – Repackage
- 1. "I Try" Released: November 26, 2024; 2. "24/7 Ride" Released: November 26, 2024

Inevitable is the sixth Korean EP by Super Junior-D&E, a subgroup of the boy band Super Junior. The album was released on September 25, 2024. The EP contains six tracks.

== Background ==
On September 12, 2024, the duo announced their comeback in South Korea after 6 months since their last Korean album, 606. The duo dropped the track list of the album on September 13, 2024. It was revealed that the title for the album would be "Go High". On September 23, 2024, they dropped the highlight medley video containing parts of the tracks from the album.

On September 25, 2024, the album was released. The duo embarked on their world tour, starting from Seoul, on September 28 and 29, along with the release of the album.

== Track listing ==
Inevitable track listing
No.	Title	Lyrics	Music	Arrangement	Length
1.	"Go High"	Donghae; Rokstaxil	Donghae; Rokstaxil	Rokstaxil	2:45
2.	"Break"	Donghae; Rokstaxil	Donghae; Rokstaxil; Kim Jun-tae; 17; jelly	17; jelly	3:12
3.	"Run Away" (도망쳐; domangchyeo)	Donghae; Rokstaxil	Donghae; Rokstaxil; 17; jelly	17; jelly	3:14
4.	"Only You"	Donghae; Rokstaxil	Donghae; Rokstaxil; Vendors; Kim Jun-tae	Rokstaxil; Arte	3:28
5.	"Eau de Perfume"	Yoo Eun-mi	Shin Kong; Vincenzo; Forever Noh; Jinho	Shin Kong; Vincenzo	3:13
6.	"Plausible Theory" (그럴듯한 가설; geureoldeuthan gaseol)	Kwon Da-eul	Vincenzo; Shin Kong; Adam Seuba	Vincenzo; Shin Kong	2:41
Total length:					18:33

Inevitable Repackage track listing
No.	Title	Lyrics	Music	Arrangement	Length
1.	"I Try"	Donghae; Rokstaxil	Donghae; Rokstaxil; 17; jelly	17; jelly	3:19
2.	"24/7 Ride"	Donghae; Rokstaxil	Donghae; Rokstaxil; Rick Bridges; Deevan; 17; jelly	17; jell	3:03
9.	"Promise" (约定 (with Siwon, Zhoumi, Ryeowook, Kyuhyun))	Donghae; Zhoumi	Donghae; Kim Jun-tae; jelly	jelly; 17	3:54
Total length:					28:49

== Charts ==
=== Weekly charts ===
Chart performance for Inevitable
Chart (2024)	Peak position
Japanese Albums (Oricon)	42
South Korean Albums (Circle)	5

=== Monthly charts ===
Monthly chart performance for Inevitable
Chart (2024)	Peak position
South Korean Albums (Circle)	14

== Release history ==
Release history for Inevitable
Region	Date	Version	Format	Label
South Korea	September 25, 2024	Inevitable	CD	ODE; Dreamus
Various	September 25, 2024	Inevitable	Digital download; streaming	ODE; Dreamus
South Korea	November 26, 2024	Repackage	CD	ODE; Dreamus
Various	November 26, 2024	Repackage	Digital download; streaming	ODE; Dreamus
