= Lo Siento (Super Junior song) =

- Digital cover

Single by Super Junior featuring Leslie Grace and Play-N-Skillz

from the album Replay (Play Repackage)
- Language: Korean; Spanish; English
- Released: April 12, 2018
- Studio: SM Big Shot, Seoul; SM LVYIN, Seoul
- Genre: Latin-pop; dancehall
- Length: 3:46
- Label: SM; Label SJ; iriver
- Composers: Daniel "Obi" Klein; Charli Taft; Andreas Oberg; Juan "Play" Salinas; Oscar "Skillz" Salinas
- Lyricists: Kenzie; Heechul; Eunhyuk; Mario Caceres; Yasmil Marrufo; Leslie Grace
- Producers: Daniel "Obi" Klein; Play-N-Skillz

Super Junior singles chronology
"Super Duper" (2018)	"Lo Siento" (2018)	"Animals" (2018)

Music video
- "Lo Siento" on YouTube

"Lo Siento" (I'm Sorry) is a trilingual song that was recorded by South Korean boy band Super Junior. The song features Dominican-American singer Leslie Grace and producers Play-N-Skillz; it was released on Replay (2018), a repackaged version of the band's eighth studio album Play (2017). SM Entertainment, Label SJ and iriver released the track as the album's lead single on April 12, 2018. Daniel "Obi" Klein, Charli Taft, Andreas Oberg, and Juan "Play" and Oscar "Skillz" Salinas composed the song, and its lyrics were written in Korean, Spanish and English by Kenzie, Mario Caceres, Yasmil Marrufo, Grace, as well as Super Junior members Heechul and Eunhyuk. The song describes love at first sight; it marks the band's first collaboration with foreign artists and their first venture into Latin pop.

A version of the song featuring Kard instead of Grace was released on the digital-download version of Replay. In South Korea, Kard members Somin and Jiwoo promoted the song with Super Junior. A remixed version by Play-N-Skillz was released on the band's Latin-pop extended play (EP) One More Time in October 2018. "Lo Siento" became the first song by a Korean singer to chart on the Latin Digital Song Sales chart published by Billboard, debuting at number 13. It also won the Best Collaboration award at the 2018 edition of the Nickelodeon Mexico Kids' Choice Awards.

Lee Gi-baek directed the song's accompanying music video, which premiered the same day as the song's release. It was viewed over 20 million times on YouTube in the month after its release. Super Junior performed the song at KCON 2018 NY music festival and as part of their world tour Super Show 7, in which Grace appeared on its Latin-American leg.

== Background and release ==
Super Junior's album Play and a special edition subtitled (Pause version) was released on November 6, and November 28, 2017, respectively. SM Entertainment announced that the album's repackage edition Replay would be released on April 12, 2018 to complete the trilogy. The album's title track was described as a unique concept that is "180 degrees opposite" to the band's usual musical style. A teaser image was released on March 27, 2018, and it was announced new tracks "Lo Siento", "Me & U", "Super Duper" and "Hug" would be included on the repackaged album. It was also confirmed "Lo Siento", a Latin-pop song, would be the lead single. The single included only seven of the eleven members of Super Junior;Leeteuk, Heechul, Yesung, Shindong, Eunhyuk, Siwon and Donghae. Other band members did not participate for various reasons; Kyuhyun and Ryeowook were carrying out their mandatory military service while Kangin and Sungmin were on hiatus. Although Heechul appeared in the teaser image, Label SJ announced he would not participate in the album's promotion because of health issues. In a separate interview, Heechul said he had been having difficulties performing on stage since the release of "Sorry, Sorry" (2009) due to a leg injury. The song's release also marked Siwon's return to the band's line-up.

The single is the band's first collaboration with foreign artists; it was produced by Play-N-Skillz and features Dominican-American singer Leslie Grace. It is also the first collaboration between a Latin artist and K-pop band. Grace's part in the collaboration came from the recommendation of Play-N-Skillz. According to Grace:

They didn't know me, they were looking for a female voice that would fit this idea of doing a trilingual song in Korean, English and Spanish and the producers of the song are friends of mine and they said 'we know a girl who could fit', and that's how I came.

In another interview, Grace praised Super Junior's approach to the collaboration, saying the band were "open to learning about [Latin] culture, and why we use certain sounds". On April 6, 2018, it was announced a special version of "Lo Siento" featuring Kard would be released on the digital download version of Replay, and that Somin and Jiwoo of Kard would join Super Junior's promotion of the song in South Korean music programs. In October 2018, Super Junior released a remixed version of the song titled "Lo Siento (Play-N-Skillz Remix ver.) (Feat. Leslie Grace)" as the fifth track on their Latin-pop EP One More Time.

== Composition and lyrics ==
"Lo Siento"
Excerpt from the song's chorus, showcasing its trilingual lyrics, and the elements of dembow rhythm and Spanish guitar.

"Lo Siento" was originally composed by Daniel "Obi" Klein, Charli Taft and Andreas Oberg. SM Entertainment engaged producers Juan and Oscar Salinas, under their working name Play-N-Skillz, to produce the track for Super Junior. "Lo Siento" is a Latin-pop song with an addictive melody and a tropical rhythm. It has also been described as a dancehall pop song, and has elements of Spanish guitars and subtle dembow riddim. It is composed in the key of A major and has a tempo of 95 beats per minute. Tamar Herman of Billboard described the song as a "bold, upbeat dance track".

The song's lyrics are in Korean, Spanish and English. Most of its lyrics were written by Kenzie, and Super Junior members Heechul and Eunhyuk write the rap parts. The Spanish lyrics, including the chorus, were written by Grace in collaboration with Mario Caceres and Yasmil Marrufo. The song's title lo siento is a Spanish phrase that means "I'm sorry". The song's lyrics describe a couple who fall in love at first sight and later decided to take a slow approach in their relationship.

== Reception ==
Billboard's Tamar Herman stated "Lo Siento" stands out from other Latin-pop songs in the K-pop scene because it is a "full-fledged international production that was crafted by different songwriters". Jang Woo-young, writing for SpoTV News praised the song's composition, stating it is impressive "various guitar sounds harmonizes rhythmically with Rhodes electric piano in different sections" of the song. Yoon Gi-baek from Sports World stated the song stands out because it "maintains the Latin vibe, yet it did not lose the identity of Super Junior". He also commented on the song's lyrics, saying "the masculine sexiness that only [Super Junior] can show is permeated throughout the lyrics"; that the Korean lyrics are an excellent fit with the Spanish lyrics; and that the Spanish lyrics sound poetic, making them enjoyable to listen to. Electronic Times writer Park Dong-seon said along with other K-pop songs released in early 2018, "Lo Siento" "reveal[s] sophisticated refreshing looks with light yet elegant choreography and delicate emotional line of vocals".

Paper placed "Lo Siento" at number 10 in its top-20 K-pop songs of 2018, calling it "one of the year's most unexpected but greatest collaborations". The song was placed at number 11 in Billboard's 20 best K-pop songs of 2018, which were chosen by music critics. The publication stated the song is a "true representation of the diverse music industries [from which] all of the artists involved come from".

== Commercial performance ==
"Lo Siento" is the first K-pop song to chart on Billboard's Latin Digital Song Sales chart, debuting at number 13 on the chart released for the week of April 28, 2018. It also debuted and peaked at number two on the World Digital Song Sales chart for the week of April 28, 2018. It stayed for three weeks on the chart, positioning at number 12 and 18 the following weeks. In South Korea, the song did not enter the Gaon Digital Chart but it peaked at number 77 on the component Mobile Ringtone Chart issue dated April 15–21, 2018.

== Promotion and live performances ==
Label SJ revealed a teaser for "Lo Siento" music video on April 10, 2018, and released the single and its music video on April 12. The music video was filmed in March 2018 at Namyangju, Gyeonggi-do, and was directed by Lee Gi-baek of Tiger-Cave. The music video depicts sensuous settings by using vivid colors and colorful neon signs that complement the song's lyrics. It also portrays scenes in which a sexy, provocative woman acted by model Jess seduces the band members. Music magazine Billboard described it as the sexiest music video ever released by the band. The music video was viewed on YouTube more than 10 million times in four days, and 20 million times by the end of April 2018.

In the week following its release, Super Junior promoted "Lo Siento" with Kard on South Korean music programs including M Countdown on April 12, Music Bank on April 13, Show! Music Core on April 14, and Inkigayo on April 15, 2018. On April 12, Super Junior appeared on the home-shopping program Super Market and performed "Lo Siento" after selling 7,000 units of face mask sets amounting to ₩900 million in 55 minutes. The band performed "Lo Siento" with Leslie Grace, who appeared as guest along with Play-N-Skillz, during the Latin-American leg of the band's world tour Super Show 7 in April 2018. They performed to a combined audience of 35,000 during their shows in Buenos Aires, Argentina; Lima, Peru; Santiago, Chile; and Mexico City, Mexico. They also promoted the song on Mexican talk show Montse y Joe, in which they performed a mariachi version of "Lo Siento". At some venues, Super Junior promoted the song without a featured artist; these venues were Cotai, Macau, in May; Manila, Philippines, in June, and Bangkok, Thailand, in November 2018.

On June 22, 2018, Super Junior appeared on Good Day New York, in which they taught the song's choreography to the hosts. The next day, they performed the song with Grace at KCON 2018 NY festival at Prudential Center, New Jersey. The event was televised in South Korea in a special episode of M Countdown that aired on July 5, 2018. Super Junior also performed "Lo Siento" with label-mate Irene in SM Town concerts on July 29 and 30, 2018, at SM Town Live 2018 in Osaka, Japan; and on January 18 and 19, 2019, in SM Town Special Stage in Santiago, Chile. On August 11, 2018, they performed the song with Kard at the 2018 K-Flow Concert in Taiwan.

== Credits and personnel ==
Credits are adapted from the liner notes of Replay:

Recording

- SM Big Shot – recording, digital editing
- SM LVYIN – recording
- SM Yellow Tail – mixing
- Sterling Sound – mastering

Personnel

- Super Junior
  - Leeteuk, Yesung, Shindong, Siwon, Donghae – vocals
  - Heechul – vocals, lyrics, rap making
  - Eunhyuk – vocals, lyrics, rap making
- Leslie Grace – vocals, lyrics
- Kenzie – lyrics, vocal director
- Mario Caceres – lyrics
- Yasmil Marrufo – lyrics
- Daniel "Obi" Klein – composition, arrangement, producer
- Charli Taft – composition, background vocals
- Andreas Oberg – composition, guitar
- Play-N-Skillz – arrangement, producer
  - Juan "Play" Salinas – composition
  - Oscar "Skillz" Salinas – composition
- Lee Min-gyu – recording, digital editing
- Lee Ji-hong – recording
- Goo Jong-pil (Beat Burger) – mixing
- Chris Gehringer – mastering

== Charts ==
=== Weekly charts ===
Chart (2018)	Peak position
US Latin Digital Song Sales (Billboard)	13
US World Digital Songs (Billboard)	2

== Accolades ==
Year	Award	Category	Result	Ref.
2018	Nickelodeon Mexico Kids' Choice Awards	Best Collaboration	Won	

== Release history ==
Release dates and formats for "Lo Siento"
Region	Date	Version	Format(s)	Label(s)	Ref.
Various	April 12, 2018	Original	Digital download; streaming	SM; Label SJ; iriver	
Various	April 12, 2018	Featuring Kard	Digital download; streaming	SM; Label SJ; iriver	
Various	October 8, 2018	Play-N-Skillz remix	Digital download; streaming	SM; Label SJ; iriver	
