= One More Chance (Super Junior song) =

Single by Super Junior

from the album Play
- Language: Korean
- Released: October 30, 2017
- Recorded: 2017
- Studio: Doobdoob (Seoul); Seoul
- Genre: Pop rock; ballad
- Length: 4:15
- Label: SM; Label SJ; Genie
- Composers: Donghae; J-DUB
- Lyricists: Donghae; J-DUB; Eunhyuk
- Producer: J-DUB

Super Junior singles chronology
"Magic" (2015)	"One More Chance" (2017)	"Black Suit" (2017)

Music video
- "One More Chance" on YouTube

"One More Chance" (비처럼 가지 마요; Bicheoreom gaji mayo; 'Don't go like the rain') is a single released by the South Korean boy band Super Junior on October 30, 2017, for their studio album, Play.

This single marked the group's return from their two-year hiatus due to most of its members were undergoing their mandatory military service, and the first Super Junior single released under their exclusive label, Label SJ.

== Background and release ==
The single was recorded with only seven members present — Leeteuk, Heechul, Yesung, Donghae, Shindong, Eunhyuk, and Siwon. Ryeowook and Kyuhyun were undergoing their mandatory military service starting from October 11, 2016, and May 25, 2017, respectively.

Sungmin did not join the comeback after his discharge from the military in 2016 due to the backlash from the fans following his sudden marriage in 2014. Kangin was in hiatus after being caught drunk driving in 2016.

Following the discharge of Eunhyuk, Donghae, and Siwon in the middle of 2017, Sports Dong-a reported that the group would make a comeback at the 12th anniversary of the group on November 6, 2017. However, Label SJ denied the rumour, saying that although the band was preparing for an album, its release date has not been decided.

Label SJ announced the album title as Play on October 18. Donghae first revealed the track on the October 19 episode of SJ Returns and began reciting its lyrics. The October 25th episode revealed that the song was voted as the pre-release single over "Scene Stealer."

On October 30, "One More Chance" was released as a pre-release single ahead of the album's release on November 6.

== Composition ==
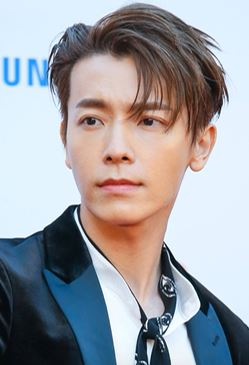
Donghae was credited as the co-lyricist and the co-composer

The song is classified as a pop rock ballad that features a subtle build to guide the song's melodic vocals. It is composed in the key of G Major, with the tempo of 74 beats per minute by the producer J-DUB and Donghae.

Donghae and J-DUB were credited as the co-lyricist, it was written during the former's mandatory military service and he said he wasn't planning for the song to be a title track. Member Eunhyuk was involved in writing the rap lyrics. He described the song as a retrospective track that evokes the maturity of Super Junior who were already in their second decade in the K-pop industry. Eunhyuk enjoyed his melodic and straightforward lyrics.

Heechul was surprised at Donghae's dedication and his ability to lead the team well during the recording. During Yesung's recording episode, he commented that Donghae's music style is based on analogy and requested that the former to squeeze out his vocal power.

== Music video ==
The teaser clip for the music video was released on social media two hours before the full music video release. The music video was uploaded on the midnight of October 31.

== Live performance ==
The song was performed live for the first time on Mnet's M Countdown on November 9. Followed by a performance on Inkigayo on November 12. On the 20th, the group performed the song on CJ O Shopping program, Super Market, fulfilling their pledge of hosting a home shopping show if the album sold over 200,000 copies.

The song was then featured as a setlist for their concert, Super Show 7 and Super Show 9: Road. New subunit Super Junior-L.S.S. included the song in the setlist of the "Let's Standing Show" fan meeting in 2023.

== Chart ==
Chart performance for One More Chance
Chart (2017)	Peak position
South Korea (Gaon)	64

== Credits ==
Credits adapted from the album's liner notes.

Studio

- Doobdoob Studio − recording, digital editing
- Seoul Studio − recording
- SM Blue Ocean Studio − mixing
- Sterling Sound − mastering

Personnel

- Label SJ − executive producer
- SM Entertainment − executive supervisor
- Tak Young-jun − producer
- Yoo Young-jin − music and sound supervisor
- Super Junior − producer, vocals
  - Donghae − lyrics, composition, vocal directing
  - Eunhyuk − lyrics
- J-DUB − producer, lyrics, composition, arrangement, vocal directing, background vocals, guitar, programming, digital editing
- Jang Sung-min − bass
- Yung − strings
- Nile Lee − strings conducting, strings arrangement
- Kim Hyun-gon − recording
- Jang Woo-young − recording, digital editing
- Ahn Chang-kyu − recording
- Jeong Ki-hong − recording
- Ji Yong-joo − recording
- Kim Cheol-sun − mixing
- Chris Gehringer − mastering

== Release history ==
Release dates and formats
Region	Date	Format(s)	Distributor
South Korea	October 30, 2017	Digital download; streaming	SM; Label SJ; Genie
Various	October 30, 2017	Digital download; streaming	SM; Label SJ
