= Play (Super Junior album) =

- Digital cover

Studio album by Super Junior
- Released: November 6, 2017
- Recorded: 2017
- Studios: 821 Sound (Seoul); Doobdoob (Seoul); In Grid (Seoul); MonoTree (Seoul); Seoul; SM Big Shot (Seoul); SM Blue Cup (Seoul); SM LVYIN (Seoul); SM Yellow Tail (Seoul); T (Seoul); The Vibe (Seoul)
- Genres: K-pop; synthfunk; R&B
- Length: 35:03; 52:41 (Replay - repackage)
- Language: Korean
- Labels: SM; Label SJ; Genie; IRIVER (repackage)
- Producers: Tak Young-jun; Super Junior

Super Junior chronology
Devil (2015)	Play (2017)	One More Time (2018)

Singles from Play
- 1. "One More Chance" Released: October 30, 2017; 2. "Black Suit" Released: November 6, 2017

Repackaged edition cover
- Digital cover

Singles from Replay
- 1. "Super Duper" Released: March 23, 2018; 2. "Lo Siento" Released: April 12, 2018

Play is the ninth Korean-language studio album (tenth overall) by South Korean boy band Super Junior, released on November 6, 2017, by SM Entertainment. The album features seven members, marking the return of Shindong, Eunhyuk, Donghae and Siwon after their mandatory military service. Ahead of the official release, SM Entertainment released the single "One More Chance" on October 30, 2017. The single "Black Suit" was released on the same day as the album.

The album features the vocals of only seven Super Junior members. Only six members promoted the album formally: Leeteuk, Heechul, Yesung, Donghae, Shindong, and Eunhyuk. Vocals belonging to Kyuhyun and Siwon can also be heard on the album. The album's repackage, Replay, was released on April 12, 2018. According to the music data provider Gaon, the album sold over 200,000 copies on its first week of release.

== Background ==
South Korean boyband Super Junior released compilation albums to commemorate their tenth debut anniversary in two parts, Devil in July 2015, and Magic in September 2015 through their label SM Entertainment. Devil went on to be nominated for Album of the Year at the 2015 Mnet Asian Music Awards, and won an award each at the 5th Gaon Chart K-Pop Awards, and the 30th Golden Disk Awards. The year also saw SM Entertainment creating a new custom label, Label SJ which would independently act both as recording and management label for the band. All members of Super Junior renewed their contract with SM Entertainment that year except for Kim Ki-bum who officially departed from the band in August 2015, in between the two albums' releases, leaving the band with eleven members. Super Junior underwent hiatus shortly after Magic's released due to most of their members were undergoing their mandatory military enlistment.

The members who had finished their mandatory military enlistment prior to the hiatus embarked on solo activities outside the band. Super Junior's leader Leeteuk went on to become a prominent television host, notably for presenting I Can See Your Voice, Idol Star Athletics Championships, and The Best Cooking Secrets. Heechul became a fixed cast member of the variety show Knowing Bros, and released a chart-topping rock song "Sweet Dream" (2016) with Universe Cowards. Meanwhile, Yesung released solo extended plays Here I Am (2016), and Spring Falling (2017), both to commercial success. Shindong, who enlisted prior to Devil's released in 2015 was discharged in December 2016. He founded the production company, Walala Production and directed the music videos for "Lemonade Love" by Parc Jae-jung and Mark Lee, "Marry Man" from his own collaboration with UV, and Red Velvet's "Rebirth" in 2017. The four of them performed on stage as Super Junior at the annual SM Town concert tour, SM Town Live Tour VI in Seoul in 2017, marking them as the group with the smallest line-up in the concert tour.

Sungmin who was discharged in 2016 was originally meant to join the band's line-up but he decided not to participate in the performance and the upcoming album due to negative fan backlash originated from his sudden marriage in 2014. Donghae, Eunhyuk, and Siwon enlisted in 2015 and were discharged in 2017. Kangin was in hiatus since he was caught drunk driving in 2016. The youngest band members Ryeowook and Kyuhyun enlisted in 2016 and 2017, respectively.

Star News reported in January 2017 that Super Junior were going to make a comeback later that year after Siwon was discharged in August. In May, the band opened their official Instagram account. In September 2017, Sports Dong-a reported that Super Junior would release a new album on their 12th debut anniversary on November 6, 2017, two years since the release of Devil. However, Label SJ denied the rumour, saying that although the band was preparing for an album, its release date has not been decided. While hosting the 2017 edition of Asia Song Festival on September 24, Leeteuk revealed that the band was in the final stage of their album's preparation and was in the process of filming a music video. At midnight of September 27, a photo containing the cryptic word "D-40" and "SJ Returns" was posted on Super Junior's social media accounts. The band's website also began a countdown to November 6, 2017, the date of their 12th anniversary, confirming their album's release date. Label SJ announced the album title as Play on October 18, as well as its dual meaning, to 'replay the music' and 'play excitedly'.

== Composition and production ==
Play was introduced as an album consisting of popular tracks. It is influenced by old-school R&B and synth funk. It also marked the band's departure from hook songs, and autotune. Super Junior stated that the album is a result of their desire to showcase their musical colours, and it has a more mature aspect than their previous album concepts. The album primarily featured the vocals of seven active members of the band namely Leeteuk, Heechul, Yesung, Shindong, Eunhyuk, Donghae, and Siwon. Kyuhyun's voice can be heard in two tracks, "Girlfriend" and "Too Late" as they were recorded prior to his enlistment in May 2017.

The band members actively participated in the album's production including in the selection process of the title track and writing lyrics for other tracks in the album. Yesung stated that the song he wrote did not make it to the album's final cut as it was outvoted by the other members. The absence of treble vocalists in the band's line-up influenced the tracks selection in the album. The selected tracks were noted to be in lower range than their previous releases. The album was produced by Super Junior and Tak Young-jun, and was mastered by Chris Gehringer. The record was the first album published by Label SJ for the band since its establishment in 2015. Heechul originally opposed releasing the record in physical form as he claimed that people does not use CD player anymore but yielded for the sake of their fans. The album jacket photoshoot was taken at Deokyang-gu, Goyang-si, Gyeonggi-do in September 2017.

The record consisted of 10 tracks. The opening track "Black Suit" is a dance-pop song written with emphasise on synth and brass instruments. Its composition was described as a restrained melody played on top of a swing brass rhythm. Characterised by its cheerful melody and addictive chorus, the song reflected the K-pop trend during the moment of its release. "Black Suit" lyrics told the story of a man in a black suit who stole hearts in the fleeting moment in the dark, inspired by the character Lupin. The band explained that the song portrayed the group's existing bright image but with addition of their maturity. Heechul described it as a dance song, while Yesung introduced it as a song that excites people. News publication Ten Asia described the song as a result of the band "pursuing a more sophisticated style" yet still "showing some of their music colours". It was picked over "Scene Stealer" as the album's title track through an anonymous voting carried out by the band and their production team, winning the vote marginally six to five. "Scene Stealer", which was originally titled "Party Over Here", is a funky dance song with pleasant rap and bold bass rhythm. The lyrics is penned solely by Eunhyuk.

"One More Chance" (Korean title: Bicheoreom Gaji Mayo; lit.: Please don't go like the rain) is a British pop and rock ballad song. It was released as a pre-release single on October 31, 2017, accompanied by a music video. The song was co-written by Donghae, who wrote it while serving in the military. A love song, Donghae cited his dating experience and the band members as inspirations for his writing. He further stated that the song deviates from Super Junior's usual musical style, and it is suitable to be listened to in autumn and winter. Its rap lyrics was penned by Eunhyuk. The song incorporated the imagery of silent rain as an analogy to breakup. Other tracks in the album include "Good Day for a Good Day", which is an uptempo song with vintage rock guitar riff and boom up sound, and "Runaway", a bright uptempo song with funky rhythm, guitar riff and brass, which encourage the listeners to escape from their busy daily life.

"The Lucky Ones" showcased Super Junior's clear vocals. It starts with a simple guitar riff leading to a rich sound and repeated synth after the chorus. The song conveys the belief that anyone who has someone to love are indeed lucky and how the listeners should not let them go. "Girlfriend" (Korean title: Yeppeo Boyeo; lit.: You look pretty), a medium tempo pop song with trendy synth explored someone's emotion as they became closer with their love interest. "Spin Up!" is a boom up disco track with brass and bass played on loop on top of bouncing rhythm. It is also categorised as a new jack swing song. The track compared the world to a spinning top that revolves involuntarily due to outside forces, and encourage the listeners to just walk in rhythm of the "spin". The ballad "Too Late" (Korean title: Sigan Cha; lit.: Time difference), incorporated emotional piano melody and strong drum sound. The song described the feelings of a man who regretted losing his lover. Xports News classified the song as the culmination of Super Junior's breakup ballad song. On the closing track "I do" (Korean title: Du Beonjjae Gobaek; lit.: Second confession), Super Junior conveyed their feelings towards their fans. It is a pop song with elements of hip hop based drum, and piano. The song is likened by fans and critics to the band's 2007 single "Marry U".

== Release and promotion ==
Super Junior launched a teaser of their web-reality show SJ Returns on streaming websites Naver TV and V Live on September 29, 2017. The show, which started airing on October 9, 2017, documented the band's 120 days of preparatory period leading up to the release of Play. The band then revealed two contrasting teaser images on October 17, 2017. One of the image was in black-and-white, depicting the band wearing suits while the other was a colourful image showing them wearing pastel-tone outfits. Individual teaser images of the band members were sequentially revealed between October 18 and October 20.

The first single from the album, "One More Chance" was released on October 30, 2017, with its accompanying music video on SM Town's YouTube channel. The music video depicted Super Junior members in various emotional scenes, notably some of which involved them running in the rain. Billboard described it as "emotive" and "melancholic". The band held the Catch SJ If You Can event for a week starting October 31, 2017, which involved fans taking picture of Super Junior's digital poster located at Konkuk University station, Jamsil station, Samseong station, and Sadang station in Seoul Subway Line 2, and uploaded them on social media for a chance to win a signed album. However, on October 31, 2017, Label SJ announced that Siwon will no longer participate in the album's promotion following an incident in which the CEO of a famous Korean restaurant died after being bitten by his family dog. Thus, the studio album would only be promoted by six members of the band, their smallest line-up since debut. Super Junior then released several video teasers for the title track "Black Suit" starting November 1, 2017.

Play was released on November 6, 2017. Super Junior held a press conference at the Grand InterContinental Seoul Parnas hotel on the same day to introduce their album. The band members noticeably were wearing black suit to the event. In the press conference, Eunhyuk pledged that if they managed to sell more than 200,000 copies of the album, the band will appear on a homeshopping program to sell black suits. The single "Black Suit" and its music video, which was directed by Rigend Film, was premiered in front of journalists, before it was released on the evening of November 6, 2017. It featured the band members plotting a heist to steal an expensive black suit in an auction, however the suit was stolen due to unforeseen circumstances. The band members play various roles in the music video; Leeteuk as the auction host, Heechul as an investor, Yesung as a courier, Shindong as a rich man, Eunhyuk as an appraiser, Siwon as a client agent, and Donghae as a bodyguard. Siwon's part in the music video was retained despite his non-participation in the album promotion. The music video was filmed over a few days in September at a set located at Namyangju, Gyeonggi-do. In the same day, the band held a commemorative event entitled SuJu and Elf Play Again, at SM Theatre located at Coex Artium with around 500 fans. The event was livestreamed on V Live.

Super Junior appeared on several entertainment programs to promote the album. They appeared on the 100th episode of Knowing Bros, a variety show co-hosted by Heechul, ahead of the album's release on November 4, 2017. They also appeared on Weekly Idol on November 8 and November 15, while band members Eunhyuk, Shindong, Donghae and Heechul appeared on Life Bar on November 9. Super Junior become the guest host on Saturday Night Live 9 on November 11, in which the band members took part in sketches and acted in various roles. They also appeared in variety show Running Man which aired on November 12, 2017. On November 9, 2017, the band guest hosted SBS Power FM radio program 2 O'Clock Cultwo Show. On November 20, they fulfill their pledge to appear on a homeshopping program and appeared on the special program Supermarket aired on CJ O Shopping channel to sell winter jackets. The products were sold out only in half an hour of broadcast, prompted them to fulfill another pledge where they filmed a music video for "One More Chance" at the set, directed by Shindong.

On November 28, it was released the 'Pause' version of the album that includes the song "Shadowless" from Super Junior's vocal subunit K.R.Y.

=== Live performances ===
Super Junior promoted the album on music programs shortly following its release. The band performed "Black Suit" and "One More Chance" on M! Countdown on November 9, on Music Bank on November 10, and on Inkigayo on November 12, 2017.

=== Super Show 7 ===
On December 15, 16 and 17, the group held its "Super Show 7" at Jamsil Gymnasium in southern Seoul.

== Reception ==
According to the music data provider Gaon, the album sold over 200,000 copies on its first week of release, making it their highest first week-sales number ever. Play debuted 3rd on Billboard World Albums chart for the week of November 25.

== Replay ==
On March 19, 2018, SM Entertainment announced that a repackage edition of the album entitled Replay will be released to complete the trilogy of Play–Pause–Replay. On March 23, 2018, a pre-released single "Super Duper" was released on SM Station season 2, marking it as the season's 50th release. A teaser image was released on March 27, 2018, alongside the announcement that four new tracks will be included in the album namely "Lo Siento", "Me & U", "Super Duper" and "Hug". The latin-pop track "Lo Siento" was also announced to serve as the album's title track. Shortly after, Label SJ announced that Heechul would not promote the album due to his leg injury while Siwon would return to the band's line-up.

On April 4, it was revealed Super Junior would collaborate with Leslie Grace, marking the group's first collaboration with a foreign artist.

== Track listing ==
"Black Suit" and "One More Chance" version
No.	Title	Lyrics	Music	Length
1.	"Black Suit"	Lee Seu-ran; Jo Yoon-kyung; Oh Min-joo; Im Jung-hyo; ESBEE	Martin Hedegaard; Coach & Sendo	3:21
2.	"Scene Stealer"	Eunhyuk	Joseph "Joe Millionaire" Foster; Davey Nate; Prince Chapelle; Phillip Guillory; MZMC; Otha "Vakseen" Davis III	3:25
3.	"One More Chance" (비처럼 가지 마요; Bicheoreom gaji mayo; 'Don't go like the rain')	Donghae; JDUB; Eunhyuk	Donghae; JDUB	4:15
4.	"Good Day for a Good Day"	Jo Yoon-kyung; Park Sung-hee; Eunhyuk	Didrik Thott; Josef Melin; Chris Meyer	3:05
5.	"Runaway"	Shin Agnes	Onestar; Choo Dae-gwan; Jeok-jae	3:26
6.	"The Lucky Ones"	Seo Ji-eum; Jin-ri	Lee Paul Williams; Jörgen Kjell Elofsson; Anton Martensson	3:38
7.	"Girlfriend" (예뻐 보여; Yeppeo boyeo; 'Looks pretty')	Lee Seu-ran; Eunhyuk	DAVII	3:23
8.	"Spin Up!"	Yoon-kyung; Heechul; Eunhyuk	Mike Woods; Kevin White; Shin-hyuk; Cameron Edward Neilson; MZMC	3:09
9.	"Too Late" (시간 차; Sigan cha; 'Time difference')	Seo Ji-eum	Cesar Peralta; Christopher Golighty; Francia Lopez; Anthony Lee	3:30
10.	"I Do" (두 번째 고백; Du beonjjae gobaek; 'Second confession')	Yoda; Min Yeon-jae; 1wol 8il; Heechul	Shin-hyuk; Jeff Lewis; Bae Min-soo; Sun; Mrey	3:31
Total length:				34:43

"Pause" version
No.	Title	Lyrics	Music	Length
11.	"Shadowless" (愛,태우다; ae,taeuda; lit. 'Love, burn' (CD Only) (performed by Super Junior-K.R.Y.))	Seo Ji-eum	Hwang Chan-hee; PJT; S2REN	3:51
Total length:				38:34

Replay – repackaged
No.	Title	Lyrics	Music	Length
1.	"Lo Siento" (featuring Leslie Grace and Play-N-Skillz)	Kenzie; Heechul; Eunhyuk; Mario Caceres; Yasmil Marrufo; Leslie Grace	Daniel "Obi" Klein; Charli Taft; Andreas Oberg; Juan "Play" Salinas; Oscar "Skillz" Salinas; Play N Skillz	3:46
4.	"Me & U"	Lee Woo-jin; Song Min-joo; Jo Yoon-kyung; Eunhyuk	Jamil "Digi" Chammas; Justin Lucas; Michael (M. Bronx) SanFilippo; Anthony Pavel; MZMC	3:21
8.	"Super Duper"	Team One Sound; Leeteuk	Team One Sound; Leeteuk	3:14
11.	"Hug" (안아줄게; Anajulge; 'I'll hug you')	Ye-sung; Min Yeon-jae	Yesung; Phenomenote; Kwon Doctor	3:46
Total length:				48:50

Replay – Digital version
No.	Title	Lyrics	Music	Length
15.	"Lo Siento" (featuring KARD)	Kenzie; Heechul; Eunhyuk; Mario Caceres; Yasmil Marrufo; Leslie Grace	Daniel "Obi" Klein; Charli Taft; Andreas Oberg; Juan "Play" Salinas; Oscar "Skillz" Salinas; Play N Skillz	3:46
Total length:				52:43

== Personnel ==
Credits for Play are adapted from the album's liner notes. Additional credits are adapted from Replay.

- Super Junior – producer
  - Leeteuk, Shindong, Siwon – vocals
  - Heechul – vocals, rap making (on "Spin Up!", "I Do", "Lo Siento")
  - Yesung – vocals, vocal direction (on "Hug")
  - Eunhyuk – vocals, rap making (on "One More Chance", "Good Day For a Good Day", "Girlfriend", "Lo Siento", "Me & U")
  - Donghae – vocals, vocal direction (on "One More Chance")
  - Kyuhyun – vocals (on "Girlfriend", "Too Late", "Shadowless"), background vocals (on "Too Late")
  - Ryeowook – vocals (on "Shadowless")
- Leslie Grace – vocals (on "Lo Siento")

Additional musicians

- Joo Chan-yang (Iconic Sounds) – background vocals (on "Black Suit")
- Hwang Seong-jae – background vocals (on "Black Suit", "Me & U"), digital editing (on "Black Suit")
- Davey Nate – background vocals (on "Scene Stealer")
- J-dub – background vocals, guitar, programming, digital editing (all on "One More Chance")
- Josef Melin – background vocals (on "Good Day For a Good Day")
- ESBEE – background vocals (on "Good Day For a Good Day")
- Onestar – background vocals (on "Runaway", "The Lucky Ones", "Spin Up!")
- Choo Dae-gwan – background vocals, keyboard (all on "Runaway")
- Byun Jang-mun – background vocals (on "The Lucky Ones", "I Do")
- Lee Williams – background vocals (on "The Lucky Ones")
- DAVII – background vocals, piano (on "Girlfriend")
- Hwang Chan-hee – background vocals (on "Shadowless")
- Noh Young-chae – background vocals (on "Shadowless")
- Charli Taft – background vocals (on "Lo Siento")
- Andreas Oberg – background vocals (on "Lo Siento")
- Anthony Pavel – background vocals (on "Me & U")
- Peter & Sky – background vocals (on "Super Duper")
- Kang Tae-woo – background vocals (on "Hug")
- TST Hornsection:
  - Kim Dong-ha – trumpet, brass arrangement, conductor (all on "Black Suit", "Runaway")
  - Jang Hyo-seok – tenor saxophone (on "Black Suit", "Runaway")
  - Lee Dae-nam – baritone saxophone (on "Black suit", "Runaway")
  - Lee Han-jin – trombone (on "Black Suit", "Runaway")
- Jung String – string (on "One More Chance", "Shadowless", "Hug")
- Lee Na-il – string arrangement and conducting (on "One More Chance", "Hug")
- Park In-young – string arrangement and conducting (on "Shadowless")
- Jang Sung-min – bass (on "One More Chance")
- Kim Byung-seok – bass (on "Runaway")
- Choi Hoon – bass (on "Shadowless", "Hug")
- Jeok Jae – guitar (on "Runaway")
- Im Min-ki – guitar (on "Girlfriend")
- Hong Jun-ho – guitar (on "Shadowless")
- Jung Soo-wan – guitar (on "Hug")
- Song Woo-jin (Chans Line) – piano (on "Shadowless")
- Cho Jae-bum (bighand joe) – percussion (on "Hug")

Technical personnel

- Tak Young-jun – producer
- Daniel "Obi" Klein – producer (on "Lo Siento")
- Play-N-Skillz – producer (on "Lo Siento")
- Butterfly – vocal direction (on "Black Suit", "Me & U"), digital editing (on "Me & U")
- Team One Sound – vocal direction (on "Scene Stealer", "Super Duper")
- J-dub – vocal direction (on "One More Chance")
- Kim Jin-han – vocal direction (on "Good Day For a Good Day")
- Onestar – vocal direction (on "Runaway")
- Choo Dae-gwan – vocal direction, recording, digital editing (all on "Runaway", "Too Late")
- LOGONE – vocal direction (on "The Lucky Ones")
- DAVII – vocal direction (on "Girlfriend")
- G-High – vocal direction, digital editing (all on "Spin Up!")
- GDLO – vocal direction, digital editing (all on "I Do")
- Hwang Chan-hee – vocal direction (on "Shadowless")
- Kenzie – vocal direction (on "Lo Siento")
- Phenomenote – vocal direction (on "Hug")
- Jung Eui-seok – recording, mixing (on "Scene Stealer", "Runaway", "Girlfriend", "Spin Up!")
- Lee Min-gyu – recording (on "Spin Up!", "Lo Siento"), digital editing (on "Lo Siento", "Super Duper"), mixing (on "Super Duper")
- Lee Ji-hong– recording (on "Girlfriend", "Lo Siento")
- Kim Hyun-gon – recording (on "Black Suit", "Scene Stealer", "One More Chance", "Good Day For a Good Day", "Runaway", "The Lucky Ones", "Girlfriend", "Spin Up!", "Too Late", "I Do", "Me & U", "Super Duper")
- Jang Woo-young – recording (on "One More Chance", "Good Day For a Good Day", "The Lucky Ones", "Spin Up!", "Too Late", "I Do", "Me & U"), digital editing (on "One More Chance", "Good Day For a Good Day", "Girlfriend", "Spin Up!", "I Do", "Shadowless", "Super Duper")
- Ahn Chang-kyu – recording (on "Black Suit", "Scene Stealer", "One More Chance", "Good Day For a Good Day", "Runaway", "The Lucky Ones", "Girlfriend", "Too Late", "I Do", "Super Duper")
- Min Sung-soo – recording (on "Me & U")
- Jeong Eun-kyung – recording (on "Scene Stealer", "The Lucky Ones", "I Do", "Shadowless", "Super Duper", "Hug"), digital editing (on "Scene Stealer", "Shadowless")
- Woo Min-jeong – recording (on "Scene Stealer", "The Lucky Ones", "Super Duper", "Hug")
- Jeong Ki-hong – recording (on "One More Chance")
- Ji Yong-joo – recording (on "One More Chance")
- Kwak Jeong-shin – recording (on "Black Suit", "Runaway")
- Jeong Mo-yeon – recording (on "Black Suit", "Runaway")
- Kim Min-hee – recording (on "Hug")
- Oh Seong-geun – recording (on "Hug")
- Seo Mi-rae – digital editing (on "Black Suit")
- Jung Yoo-ra – digital editing (on "The Lucky Ones")
- Heo Eun-sook – digital editing (on "Hug")
- PJT – programming (on "Shadowless")
- Nam Gung-jin – mixing (on "Black Suit", "Good Day For a Good Day", "Hug")
- Koo Jong-pil (BEAT BURGER) – mixing (on "Too Late", "I Do", "Shadowless", "Lo Siento")
- Kim Chul-soon – mixing (on "One More Chance", "Runaway", "The Lucky Ones", "Me & U")
- Chris Gehringer – mastering
- Son Jae-ik – art director
- Lee Jong-kyu – design
- Kim Do-yeon – design
- Jung Min-hee – design (Note: Only for Play)
- Kim Hye-soo – "Black Suit" photographer
- Han Jong-cheol – "One More Chance" photographer
- Ahn Yeon-hoo – photographer (Note: Only for Replay)
- Yoon Won-jun – assistant photographer
- Kwon Se-won – assistant photographer
- Jeongseol – stylist
- Kim Hye-yeon – hair stylist
- Han Hyo-eun – make-up artist

Studios

- SM Blue Cup – recording (on "Runaway"), mixing (on "Scene Stealer", "Girlfriend", "Spin Up!")
- SM Big Shot – recording (on "Spin Up!", "Lo Siento"), digital editing (on "Lo Siento", "Super Duper"), mixing (on "Super Duper")
- SM LVYIN – recording (on "Girlfriend", "Lo Siento")
- doobdoob – recording (on "Black Suit", "Scene Stealer", "One More Chance", "Good Day For a Good Day", "Runaway", "The Lucky Ones", "Girlfriend", "Spin Up!", "Too Late", "I Do", "Me & U", "Super Duper"), digital editing (on "One More Chance", "Good Day For a Good Day", "Girlfriend", "Spin Up!", "I Do", "Shadowless", "Super Duper")
- In Grid – recording (on "Scene Stealer", "The Lucky Ones", "I Do", "Shadowless", "Super Duper", "Hug"), digital editing (on "Shadowless")
- Seoul Studio – recording (on "One More Chance")
- The Vibe – recording (on "Black Suit", "Runaway")
- 821 Sound – recording (on "Hug")
- T Studio – recording (on "Hug")
- MonoTree – recording (on "Runaway"), digital editing (on "Spin Up!", "Too Late")
- Anemone – digital editing (on "The Lucky Ones")
- W Sound – digital editing (on "Hug")
- SM Concert Hall – mixing (on "Black Suit", "Good Day For a Good Day", "Hug")
- SM Yellow Tail – mixing (on "Too Late", "I Do", "Shadowless", "Lo Siento")
- SM Blue Ocean – mixing (on "One More Chance", "Runaway", "The Lucky Ones", "Me & U")
- Sterling Sound – mastering

== Charts ==
=== Album ===
Play weekly chart performance
Chart (2017)	Peak position
Japanese Albums (Oricon)	16
Japanese Hot Albums (Billboard Japan)	9
South Korean Albums (Gaon)	1
US Heatseekers Albums (Billboard)	15
US World Albums (Billboard)	3

Replay weekly chart performance
Chart (2018)	Peak position
Japanese Hot Albums (Billboard Japan)	32
South Korean Albums (Gaon)	3
US Heatseekers Albums (Billboard)	19
US World Albums (Billboard)	2

Annual chart positions
Chart	Position
South Korean Albums (Gaon) – 2017	16
South Korean Albums (Gaon) – 2018 Replay	41

=== Songs ===
Song chart performance
Title	Year	Peak chart positions			
Title	Year	KOR	JPN Hot	Latin Dig.	US World
"Black Suit"	2017	23	81	—	8
"One More Chance"	2017	85	—	—	—
"Lo Siento"	2018	—	—	13	2
"—" denotes releases that did not chart

== Release history ==
Release history for Play
Region	Date	Format	Version	Label	Ref
South Korea	November 6, 2017	CD	"Black Suit"	SM; Label SJ; Genie	
South Korea	November 6, 2017	CD	"One More Chance"	SM; Label SJ; Genie	
Various	November 6, 2017	Digital download; streaming	Digital	SM; Label SJ	
South Korea	November 28, 2017	CD	"Pause"	SM; Label SJ; Genie	
Taiwan	December 27, 2017	CD	"Black Suit"	Avex Taiwan	
Taiwan	December 27, 2017	CD	"One More Chance"	Avex Taiwan	
South Korea	April 12, 2018	CD	Repackage	SM; Label SJ; iRiver	
Various	April 12, 2018	Digital download; streaming	Repackage	SM; Label SJ	
South Korea	April 24, 2018	Kihno; Kit video	Repackage	SM; Label SJ; iRiver	
Taiwan	June 1, 2018	CD	Repackage	Avex Taiwan	
