= Countdown (Super Junior-D&E album) =

2021 studio album by Super Junior-D&E

- Digital cover

Studio album by Super Junior-D&E
- Released: November 2, 2021
- Recorded: 2021
- Studio: Doobdoob Studio; Golden Bell Tree Sound; MonoTree Studio; SM Big Shot Studio; SM Starlight Studio; SM SSAM Studio; SM Yellow Tail Studio; Sound Pool Studio; T-Studio
- Genre: Hip house; hip-hop; pop rock
- Length: 34:09; 37:40 (Zero ver. (Epilogue)); 34:39 (BE version); 38:18 (CALIFORNIA LOVE version)
- Language: Korean
- Label: SM; Label SJ; Dreamus
- Producer: Brock Buchanan Westover Jr.; Cesar Da Emperor; Deevan (X&); Erik Lidbom; J-DUB; Joony (153/Jombas); Lee Soo-man; Loogone; Nico The Owl; PixelWave; Rian Ball; Steeve Mad

Super Junior-D&E chronology
Bad Blood (2020)	Countdown (2021)	606 (2024)

Singles from Countdown
- 1. "California Love" Released: 13 October 2021; 2. "Blue Moon" Released: 16 October 2021; 3. "be" Released: 20 October 2021; 4. "Zero" Released: 2 November 2021

Alternative cover
- Digital cover

Singles from Countdown - Zero ver. (Epilogue)
- 1. "Need U" Released: 10 December 2021

Countdown (stylized as COUNTDOWN) is the first Korean studio album of South Korean pop duo Super Junior-D&E, a subgroup of the boy band Super Junior. The album was released on November 2, 2021.

== Background ==
On September 27, 2021, the group announced they would be releasing their first Korean full-length album. They dropped a concept spoiler at the same day on their official Twitter account. Before the official release of the album, the members released their solo singles. The first single, California Love, the solo singles by member Donghae, was released on October 13, 2021. A week later, Eunhyuk released his solo singles, be, on October 20, 2021.

On December 10, 2021, the group released an epilogue version of the album, with an additional new track, "Need U'". Both members involved in lyrics writing of the track.

== Track listing ==
Countdown – Standard version
No.	Title	Lyrics	Music	Arrangement	Length
1.	"ZERO"	Donghae; JDUB	Donghae; JDUB; PixelWave	JDUB; PixelWave	3:26
2.	"Beautiful Liar"	Zaya (153/Joombas)	Hyuk Shin (153/Joombas); Joony (153/Joombas); JJ Evans (153/Joombas)	Joony (153/Joombas)	3:18
3.	"Far Away" (멀리; meolli; lit. 'Far')	Rick Bridges	Rick Bridges; Deevan	Deevan	3:14
4.	"Feel that Feelin’" (느낌적인 느낌; neukkimjeog-in neukkim; lit. 'Feeling feeling')	Song Yu; Kim Su-min (153/Joombas)	Jeff Lewis; Brock Westover	Brock (153/Joombas)	2:59
5.	"La La La"	Lee Ji Yeon	Cesar Peralta; Didrik Thott	Cesar Da Emperor	3:23
6.	"Have a Nice Day"	Lee Hye-yum	Nicolas Farmakalidis (NUMBER K); René Miller	Nicolas Farmakalidis (NUMBER K)	3:28
7.	"Muse"	Rick Bridges	Rian Ball; Case Arnold; Sebastian Garcia	Rian Ball	3:25
8.	"Share My Love"	danke (lalala studio)	Chris Tsika Kabala; Jean Michel Sissoko	Chris Tsika Kabala; Jean Michel Sissoko; LOOGONE; $$AM (PAPERMAKER)	3:22
9.	"Home"	Donghae; JDUB; Eunhyuk; 1iL	Donghae; JDUB	JDUB	3:58
10.	"ZERO (English ver.)"	Curtis Richardson; Adien Lewis	Donghae; JDUB; PixelWave	JDUB; PixelWave	3:26
Total length:					34:09

Countdown – Zero ver. (Epilogue)
No.	Title	Lyrics	Music	Arrangement	Length
11.	"Need U"	Eunhyuk; Donghae	Erik Lidbom; Adam Jönsson	Erik Lidbom	3:31
Total length:					37:40

Countdown – BE version
No.	Title	Lyrics	Music	Arrangement	Length
1.	"be"	Eunhyuk	Ryan Jhun; Connor McDonough; Riley McDonough; Christopher Ganoudis; Aton Ben-Horin	Rodnae 'Chikk' Bell; Connor McDonough	3:49
2.	"Red Muhly"	Eunhyuk	Colde; Khakii; basecamp	basecamp	3:33
3.	"Beautiful Liar"	Zaya (153/Joombas)	Hyuk Shin (153/Joombas); Joony (153/Joombas); JJ Evans (153/Joombas)	Joony (153/Joombas)	3:18
4.	"Far Away" (멀리; meolli; lit. 'Far')	Rick Bridges	Rick Bridges; Deevan	Deevan	3:14
5.	"Feel that Feelin’" (느낌적인 느낌; neukkimjeog-in neukkim; lit. 'Feeling feeling')	Song Yu; Kim Su-min (153/Joombas)	Jeff Lewis; Brock Westover	Brock (153/Joombas)	2:59
6.	"La La La"	Lee Ji Yeon	Cesar Peralta; Didrik Thott	Cesar Da Emperor	3:23
7.	"Have a Nice Day"	Lee Hye-yum	Nicolas Farmakalidis (NUMBER K); René Miller	Nicolas Farmakalidis (NUMBER K)	3:28
8.	"Muse"	Rick Bridges	Rian Ball; Case Arnold; Sebastian Garcia	Rian Ball	3:25
9.	"Share My Love"	danke (lalala studio)	Chris Tsika Kabala; Jean Michel Sissoko	Chris Tsika Kabala; Jean Michel Sissoko; LOOGONE; $$AM (PAPERMAKER)	3:22
10.	"Home"	Donghae; JDUB; Eunhyuk; 1iL	Donghae; JDUB	JDUB	3:58
Total length:					34:39

Countdown – CALIFORNIA LOVE version
No.	Title	Lyrics	Music	Arrangement	Length
1.	"California Love" (Feat. Jeno of NCT)	Donghae; JDUB	Donghae; JDUB	JDUB	3:48
2.	"Blue Moon" (Feat. Miyeon of (G)I-dle)	Donghae; Onestar (MonoTree); 1iL; JDUB	Donghae; G-High (MonoTree); Onestar (MonoTree); 1iL; JDUB	G-High (MonoTree)	3:25
3.	"Beautiful Liar"	Zaya (153/Joombas)	Hyuk Shin (153/Joombas); Joony (153/Joombas); JJ Evans (153/Joombas)	Joony (153/Joombas)	3:18
4.	"Far Away" (멀리; meolli; lit. 'Far')	Rick Bridges	Rick Bridges; Deevan	Deevan	3:14
5.	"Feel that Feelin’" (느낌적인 느낌; neukkimjeog-in neukkim; lit. 'Feeling feeling')	Song Yu; Kim Su-min (153/Joombas)	Jeff Lewis; Brock Westover	Brock (153/Joombas)	2:59
6.	"La La La"	Lee Ji Yeon	Cesar Peralta; Didrik Thott	Cesar Da Emperor	3:23
7.	"Have a Nice Day"	Lee Hye-yum	Nicolas Farmakalidis (NUMBER K); René Miller	Nicolas Farmakalidis (NUMBER K)	3:28
8.	"Muse"	Rick Bridges	Rian Ball; Case Arnold; Sebastian Garcia	Rian Ball	3:25
9.	"Share My Love"	danke (lalala studio)	Chris Tsika Kabala; Jean Michel Sissoko	Chris Tsika Kabala; Jean Michel Sissoko; LOOGONE; $$AM (PAPERMAKER)	3:22
10.	"Home"	Donghae; JDUB; Eunhyuk; 1iL	Donghae; JDUB	JDUB	3:58
11.	"California Love" (Solo ver.)	Donghae; JDUB	Donghae; JDUB	JDUB	3:48
Total length:					38:18

== Charts ==
Chart performance for Countdown
Chart (2021)	Peak position
South Korean Albums (Gaon)	4
Japan (Oricon)	8

Chart performance for Countdown - Zero ver. (Epilogue)
Chart (2021)	Peak position
South Korean Albums (Gaon)	7

== Release history ==
Release history for Countdown
Region	Date	Version	Format	Label
South Korea	November 2, 2021	Countdown	CD	SM; Label SJ; Dreamus
Various	November 2, 2021	Countdown	Digital download; streaming	SM; Label SJ
South Korea	November 2, 2021	Countdown (be version)	CD	SM; Label SJ; Dreamus
South Korea	November 2, 2021	Countdown (California Love version)	CD	SM; Label SJ; Dreamus
South Korea	December 10, 2021	Countdown - Zero ver. (Epilogue)	CD	SM; Label SJ; Dreamus
Various	December 10, 2021	Countdown - Zero ver. (Epilogue)	Digital download; streaming	SM; Label SJ
