= Be (Eunhyuk song) =

"be"

Single by Eunhyuk

from the album Countdown (be Version)
- Language: Korean
- B-side: "Red Muhly"
- Released: October 20, 2021
- Recorded: 2021
- Studio: SM Yellow Tail (Seoul); Wavy (Seoul)
- Genre: K-pop; R&B
- Length: 3:49
- Label: SM; Label SJ; Dreamus
- Composers: Ryan S. Jhun; Connor McDonough; Riley McDonough; Christopher Ganoudis; Aton Ben-Horin
- Lyricist: Eunhyuk
- Producer: Connor McDonough

Eunhyuk singles chronology
"Today More than Yesterday" (2018)	"be" (2021)	"Mañana (Our Drama)" (2023)

Music videos
- "be" on YouTube
- "Red Muhly" on YouTube

"Be" (stylized in all lower caps) is the debut solo single released by South Korean singer-songwriter and rapper, Eunhyuk. The single was released on October 20, 2021, by labels SM Entertainment and Label SJ, and distributed by Dreamus as part of the pre-release promotions for Super Junior-D&E's debut Korean studio album, Countdown.

== Background ==
On October 15, Label SJ announced that there will be three versions of Super Junior-D&E's Countdown album and added that Eunhyuk would release his first digital solo single. Three days later, the teaser photos for "Be" was uploaded along with the announcement of B-side "Red Muhly".

On the 19th, the teaser video was uploaded on SM Town's YouTube, Naver TV, and V Live channels.

== Composition ==
"Be" is a pop song penned solely by Eunhyuk himself as it portrays his younger and dreamy self.

It is composed in the key of C# Major, with the tempo of 146 beats per minute by Ryan S. Jhun, Connor McDonough, Riley McDonough, Christopher Ganoudis, and Aton Ben-Horin.

"Red Muhly" is described as medium-tempo song with a variety of cozy synthesizers and bouncy synth bass.

== Music video ==
The music video for "Be" was released on October 20, 2021, showing Eunhyuk dancing across different sets, and showing a dreamy sequence between the present Eunhyuk and his past self. On October 22, Eunhyuk released a behind-the-scenes video of "Be" music video through Super Junior's YouTube channel.

On October 23, Eunhyuk released the music video for "Red Muhly" showing him driving and then dancing in an art gallery.

== Live performances ==
On October 22, Eunhyuk promoted the song for the first time on Music Bank, followed by a live appearance in Inkigayo two days later. On October 28, Eunhyuk performed the song on M Countdown.

"Be" was then included in the setlist of Super Junior's Super Show 9: Road concert.

== Track listing ==
No.	Title	Lyrics	Music	Arrangement	Length
1.	"be"	Eunhyuk	Ryan S. Jhun; Connor McDonough; Riley McDonough; Christopher Ganoudis; Aton Ben-Horin	Rodnae 'Chikk' Bell; Connor McDonough	3:49
2.	"Red Muhly"	Eunhyuk	Colde; Khakii; basecamp	basecamp	3:33
Total length:					7:22

== Chart ==
Chart performance for "be"
Chart (2021)	Peak position
South Korea Downloads (Gaon)	7

== Release history ==
Release dates and formats
Region	Date	Format(s)	Distributor
Various	October 21, 2021	Digital download; streaming	SM; Label SJ; Dreamus
