= One More Time (Super Junior EP) =

- Digital cover

EP by Super Junior
- Released: October 8, 2018
- Recorded: 2018
- Studio: Doobdoob (Seoul); Golden Bell Tree Sound (Seoul); Seoul; Prelude (Seoul); SM Big Shot (Seoul); SM LVYIN (Seoul); SM Yellow Tail (Seoul)
- Genre: Latin pop
- Length: 19:06
- Language: Korean; Spanish
- Label: SM; Label SJ; iRiver
- Producer: Tak Young-jun

Super Junior chronology
Play (2017)	One More Time (2018)	Time Slip (2019)

Singles from One More Time
- 1. "Animals" Released: September 27, 2018; 2. "One More Time" Released: October 8, 2018

Music videos
- "One More Time (Otra Vez)" on YouTube
- "Ahora Te Puedes Marchar" on YouTube

One More Time is the first extended play by South Korean boy band Super Junior, released on October 8, 2018, by SM Entertainment. The album is the group's first full Latin pop album, and marks the return of Ryeowook after his mandatory military service. Ahead of the official release, SM Entertainment released the single "Animals". Only seven members participated in the comeback; Leeteuk, Yesung, Shindong, Eunhyuk, Donghae, Siwon and Ryeowook. Heechul declined due to physical health issues, though he still participated in the album's recording. The same day as the release, SuJu held a music video showcase at MGM Theater Macao, on October 8, 2018.

== Background and release ==
On September 17, 2018, Super Junior released the first teaser for the album, alongside its title track and release date. This was the group's first release since Ryeowook's return from his military service. The album contains five tracks, and features Reik and Leslie Grace. Heechul and Eunhyuk helped in writing the lyrics for "Lo Siento (Play-N-Skillz Remix ver.)". The EP also contains a cover of Luis Miguel's Spanish cover version of Dusty Springfield's "I Only Want to Be with You", "Ahora Te Puedes Marchar".

In July 2018, Heechul announced on a Weibo live video, that he would not participate in the album's activities to continue recovery. However, along with the release of his teaser photo, Label SJ announced that Kim Hee-chul would take part in the recording, but not in the albums promotions.

== Track listing ==
No.	Title	Lyrics	Music	Arrangement	Length
1.	"One More Time (Otra Vez)" (featuring Reik)	ZNEE; Pablo Preciado	Andreas Stone Johansson; Denniz Jamm; Jakob Mihoubi; Rudi Daouk	Andreas Stone Johansson; Denniz Jamm; Button Pushers	3:07
2.	"One More Time (Otra Vez)" (SJ version)	ZNEE	Andreas Stone Johansson; Denniz Jamm; Jakob Mihoubi; Rudi Daouk	Andreas Stone Johansson; Denniz Jamm; Button Pushers	3:07
3.	"Animals"	Chun Song-yi	Anton Dahlrot; Gionata Caracciolo	Gionata Caracciolo	3:31
4.	"Ahora Te Puedes Marchar"	Mike Hawker; Ivor Raymonde; Luis Gómez-Escolar	Mike Hawker; Ivor Raymonde; Luis Gómez-Escolar	Hwang Sung-je	3:10
5.	"Lo Siento" (Play-N-Skillz remix) (featuring Leslie Grace)	Kenzie; Heechul; Eunhyuk; Mario Caceres; Yasmil Marrufo; Leslie Grace	Daniel "Obi" Klein; Charli Taft; Andreas Oberg; Juan "Play" Salinas; Oscar "Skillz" Salinas	Daniel "Obi" Klein; Play-N-Skillz	4:01
Total length:					17:00

== Charts ==
=== Weekly charts ===
Chart (2018)	Peak position
South Korean Albums (Gaon)	2

=== Year-end charts ===
Chart (2018)	Position
South Korean Albums (Gaon)	32

== Rankings ==
Publisher	Year	Listicle	Nominee/work	Placement	Ref.
The Things	2020	10 Best K-Pop Collaborations With North American Artists	"Otra Vez" – Super Junior ft. Reik	8th	

== Personnel ==
Credits for One More Time is adapted from its linear notes.

- Label SJ – executive producer
- Tak Young-jun – producer
- Lee Min-gyu – recorder
- Lee Ji-hong – recorder
- Kim Hyun-gon – recorder
- Jang Woo-young – recorder
- Min Sung-soo – recorder
- Jeong Ki-hong – recorder
- Ji Yong-joo – recorder
- Hong Sung-jun – recorder
- Kim Kwang-min – recorder
- Lee Chang-seon – recorder
- by Nam Gung-jin – mixer
- Koo Jong-pil (BEAT BURGER) – mixer
- Kim Chul-soon – mixer
- Lee Min-gyu – mixer
- Chris Gehringer – mastering
- BIRD – design
- Han Jong-cheol – photographer
- Park Ji-young – stylist
- Yang Hee-jin – stylist
- Kim Hye-yeon – hair stylist
- Han Hyo-eun – make-up artist

=== "One More Time" (ft. Reik and Super Junior version) ===
- Butterfly – vocal director
- Joo Chan-yang – background vocals
- Andreas Stone Johansson – background vocals
- Denniz Jamm – background vocals
- Costa Leon – background vocals

=== "Animals" ===
- Jeon Seong-woo – vocal director, background vocals
- Anton Dahlrot – background vocal

=== "Ahora Te Puedes Marchar" ===
- Butterfly – vocal director
- Hwang Seong-je – background vocals, brass arrangement and conductor
- Seo Mi-rae – background vocals
- Jung Dong-yoon – drum
- Baek Kyung-jin – bass
- Hong Jun-ho – guitar
- Lee Ing-wan – brass
- Choi Jin-hyun– brass
- Choi Jae-moon– brass

== Release history ==
Region	Date	Format	Label
South Korea	October 8, 2018	CD	SM; Label SJ; iRiver
Various	October 8, 2018	Digital download; streaming	SM; Label SJ
