= The Little Prince (EP) =

EP by Ryeowook
- Released: January 28, 2016
- Recorded: 2016
- Studios: Doobdoob (Seoul); In Grid (Seoul); Sound (Seoul)
- Genres: Pop; R&B
- Length: 23:03
- Language: Korean
- Labels: Label SJ; SM; KT
- Producer: Lee Soo-man

Ryeowook chronology
The Little Prince (2016)	Drunk on Love (2019)

Singles from The Little Prince
- 1. "The Little Prince" Released: January 28, 2016

Music video
- "The Little Prince" on YouTube

The Little Prince (Korean: 어린왕자; RR: Eorin Wangja) is the solo debut extended play (EP) by South Korean singer and actor Kim Ryeo-wook, a member from boy group Super Junior. It was released on January 28, 2016, by Label SJ, SM Entertainment and distributed by KT Music. The EP featured six tracks in total, including the lead single, "The Little Prince".

== Background ==
The release of The Little Prince was not only anticipated as Ryeowook's first official solo album since his debut 11 years ago but also because it was the first release under Super Junior's own label "Label SJ", established by SM Entertainment on November 6, 2015, during the group's 10th anniversary.

== Production and composition ==
The title track bearing the same name as the album was a ballad inspired by French author Antoine de Saint-Exupéry's novel "The Little Prince". The title track "The Little Prince" was a pop ballad song and a conversation between a man in pain from love and The Little Prince.

His album consists of songs that are very different in flavor. The lyrics for "POOM" was written by Ryeowook, and depicts the words that a son wants to tell his mother but doesn't know where to begin. "Foxy Girl" is a light mid-tempo dance song, and features rapper DinDin. Ballad song "Like a Star" help to bring out the clear vocals of Ryeowook, with orchestra and piano music. The album also includes a retro song "Hello" and the song "People you may know" which tells of one's feelings after seeing the photos of someone you have just broke up with appear on the social media recommendations.

== Promotion ==
=== Release ===
On January 19, 2016, the first two teasers were uploaded via SM Town. The Little Prince was officially available on January 28, through online and regular stores.

=== Live performance ===
Ryeowook hold his commemorative showcase for his mini-album release on the January 25 at 4 PM. During the event, he presented the first stages of the songs from The Little Prince as well as the episodes related to the album. He also hold his first broadcast stage via M Countdown on the day of release.

=== Solo Concert ===
In addition to Ryeowook's solo promotions and album release, he held his first solo concert through SMTOWN's The Agit series called "Ever Lasting Star - RyeoWook" from February 19 until the 21st for three days at the SMTOWN's Coex Artium in Samseong-dong, Seoul. Due to popular demand, an additional three concerts were held from March 11 through the 13th.

== Track listing ==
CD/Digital
No.	Title	Lyrics	Music	Arranger(s)	Length
1.	"Like a Star"	4th Hitter	4th Hitter	4th Hitter	3:33
2.	"The Little Prince" (어린왕자; Eorinwangja)	Red Head Anne; Oh Ja-hyun	Red Head Anne; Shin Yoon-soo	Hwang Seong-je	4:21
3.	"Hello" (그대; Geudae; 'You')	G-High; GDLO	G-High; GDLO	G-High; GDLO	3:21
4.	"People You May Know" (알 수도 있는 사람; Al sudo inneun saram; 'Someone who might know')	Park Chang-hyun	Park Chang-hyun	Park Chang-hyun	4:20
5.	"Foxy Girl" (featuring DinDin)	Ecobridge; HILO (Isaac Han); Aaron Kim	Ecobridge; HILO (Isaac Han); Aaron Kim	Ecobridge; HILO (Isaac Han); Aaron Kim	3:18
6.	"POOM" (품; Pum; 'Product')	Kim Ryeo-wook; G-High; Asher Park	G-High; Asher Park; Song Shi-yoon	G-High; Asher Park	4:10
Total length:					23:03

== Release history ==
Release history for The Little Prince
Region	Date	Format	Label
South Korea	January 28, 2016	CD	SM; Label SJ; KT
Various	January 28, 2016	Digital download; streaming	SM; Label SJ

== Chart performance ==
=== Album charts ===
Chart (2016)	Peak position	Sales
South Korean Gaon Weekly Albums Chart	1	KOR: 44,556+
South Korean Gaon Monthly Albums Chart	3	KOR: 44,556+
South Korean Gaon Year-End Albums Chart		KOR: 44,556+
US Billboard World Albums Chart	5	KOR: 44,556+

=== Single charts ===
A Little Prince

Chart (2016)	Peak position	Sales
South Korean Gaon Weekly Singles Chart	7	279,574+ (digital downloads only)
South Korean Gaon Monthly Download Chart	62	279,574+ (digital downloads only)
South Korean Gaon Year-End Download Chart		279,574+ (digital downloads only)

=== Other charted songs ===
Title	Peak chart position	Sales
Title	KOR Gaon	Sales
"Like A Star"	141	KOR: 17,532+ (digital downloads only)
"People You May Know"	161	KOR: 15,523 + (digital downloads only)
"POOM"	166	KOR: 15,136+ (digital downloads only)
"Hello"	174	KOR: 13,402+ (digital downloads only)
"Foxy Girl"	189	KOR: 12,799+ (digital downloads only)

== Covers ==
- The song was covered by Stray Kids youngest member I.N.
- Also covered by DK of Seventeen.
- Another covered by fellow member Kyuhyun.
- Covered again by BTOB's Eunkwang.
- This song dueting with Sohee from boy-group RIIZE.
- This song was covered by NCT members Doyoung and Taeil.
- In survival show Universe League episode 6 this song was covered by Park Han and JL.
