= 606 (EP) =

2024 extended play by Super Junior-D&E

- Digital cover

EP by Super Junior-D&E
- Released: March 26, 2024
- Recorded: 2024
- Studio: InGrid Studio (Seoul)
- Genre: K-pop
- Length: 19:12
- Language: Korean
- Labels: ODE; Dreamus
- Producers: Super Junior-D&E

Super Junior-D&E chronology
Countdown (2021)	606 (2024)	You&Me (2024)

Singles from 606
- 1. "Rose" Released: March 19, 2024; 2. "GGB" Released: March 26, 2024

Music video
- "Rose" on YouTube "GGB" on YouTube

606 is the fifth Korean EP by Super Junior-D&E, a subgroup of the boy band Super Junior. The album was released on March 26, 2024, under ODE Entertainment. The EP was the first EP released from the duo under their new label since their departure from SM Entertainment. The EP contains six tracks.

== Background ==
On March 11, 2024, the duo announced their comeback after 2 years and 4 months since the last release with their fifth Korean EP. They dropped their concept photos on March 14, 2024.

On March 19, 2024, they dropped the pre-release song from this album, entitled "Rose".

== Track listing ==
No.	Title	Lyrics	Music	Arrangement	Length
1.	"GGB" (지지배; jijibae)	Donghae; Virgo	Donghae; Maxx Song; Park Jisan; Virgo	Park Jisan; Maxx Song	3:27
2.	"Rose"	Donghae; Virgo	Donghae; Virgo	BLSSD	3:19
3.	"Hang Over"	Rick Bridges; Donghae	Strawberrybananaclub; Rick Bridges	Strawberrybananaclub	2:57
4.	"Twisted"	Kim In-hyeong	CR Kim; SB; WON	WON	3:09
5.	"New Balance"	Kim Me-a-ri	Micah Gordon; Henrik; Gus	Micah Gordon	2:32
6.	"Missing Pieces"	bay (153/Joombas)	AVENUE 52; SQVARE	AVENUE 52	3:48
Total length:					19:12

== Charts ==
Chart performance for 606
Chart (2024)	Peak position
South Korean Albums (Circle)	5
Japan (Oricon)	5

== Release history ==
Release history for 606
Region	Date	Format	Label
South Korea	March 26, 2024	CD	ODE; Dreamus
Various	March 26, 2024	Digital download; streaming	ODE; Dreamus

== See also ==
- Super Junior-D&E discography
