= Eunhyuk =

South Korean singer-songwriter, rapper and television personality

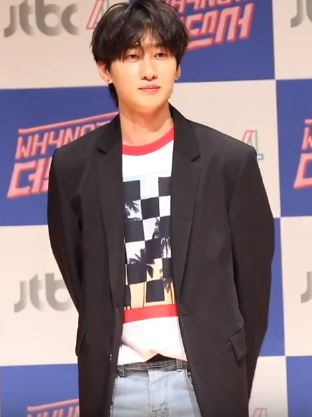
- Eunhyuk in 2018
- Born: Lee Hyuk-jae; April 4, 1986 (age 40); Incheon, South Korea
- Occupations: Singer; songwriter; rapper; actor; dancer; choreographer; concert director; musical director
- Musical career
- Genres: K-pop; electronic; R&B
- Instrument: Vocals
- Years active: 2005–present
- Labels: SM; Label SJ; ODE
- Member of: Super Junior; Super Junior-T; Super Junior-H; Super Junior-M; Super Junior-D&E; Younique Unit; SM the Performance; SM Town
- Website: Official website

Korean name
- Hangul: 이혁재
- Hanja: 李赫宰
- RR: I Hyeokjae
- MR: I Hyŏkchae

Stage name
- Hangul: 은혁
- Hanja: 銀赫
- RR: Eunhyeok
- MR: Ŭnhyŏk

Signature
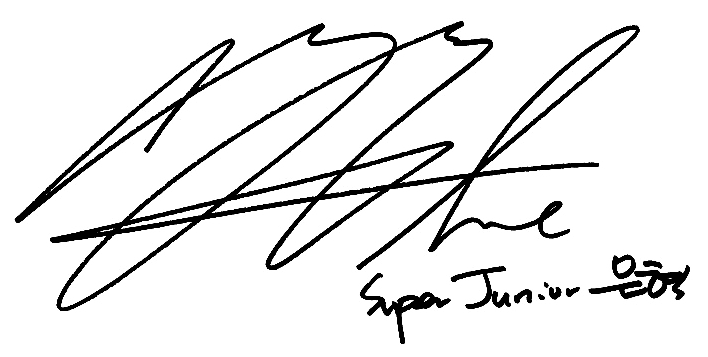

Lee Hyuk-jae (born April 4, 1986), known professionally as Eunhyuk, is a South Korean singer, songwriter, rapper, dancer, and television host. He is a member of the South Korean boy group Super Junior and its subgroups Super Junior-T and Super Junior-H. In 2011, he joined Super Junior's Mandopop subgroup Super Junior-M and the duo Super Junior-D&E, active in China and Japan respectively.

Gaining attention as the main dancer of Super Junior, he branched out with solo activities beginning as radio host through Super Junior's Kiss the Radio (2006–2011). Through television, Eunhyuk has also been a cast member in popular variety shows such as Star King (2009–11), Let's Go Dream Team 2 (2009–2011) and Strong Heart (2009–2013). After Super Junior's Devil promotions, he enlisted for military service between 2015 and 2017. Returning to work with a focus on more prominent roles, he was sanctioned as a concert director for various artists, transitioning to be a performance director and dance mentor in Under Nineteen (2018–2019) as well as become the main host of long-running idol program Weekly Idol (2020–2023).

== Early life ==
Eunhyuk was born in Incheon, South Korea, and moved to Ilsan, Gyeonggi-do at age 1. He has an older sister called Lee So-ra. Raised in a family that struggled financially, he was interested in street performing as a child. Inspired by the likes of H.O.T's Jang Woo-hyuk, Michael Jackson and singer-dancer Yoo Seung-jun, Eunhyuk trained himself at a young age. In elementary school he started a dance crew, 'SRD', which stood for Song Rap and Dance which consisted of him and his childhood friends Kim Junsu, Hwang Tae Jun, and Choi Min Seok. The crew's popularity prospered in their hometown; and when SRD appeared in a local newspaper, it was then that Eunhyuk cemented his dream to become a singer/performer.

In 1999, together with Junsu he auditioned for SM Entertainment through the company's Starlight Casting System at age 13. However he failed the audition in 1999 and entered again the following year and got in as a trainee. He began training in singing, dancing, acting, and had brief Mandarin Chinese language courses.

In the midst of trainee life in 2000, he reached SM's master dance class and won the Goyang citywide dance competition in 2000. In 2002, Eunhyuk, Kim Junsu, and another trainee Sungmin were placed in a project R&B group. A year later, the group along with three future members from TRAX (Jay Kim, No Minwoo, Kang Jungwoo) made a brief appearance in a show called Heejun vs. Kangta, Battle of the Century: Pop vs. Rock, in which Moon Hee-joon and Kangta taught them techniques on different types of singing. In 2003 the trio disbanded when Junsu went on to debut as a member of TVXQ. Eunhyuk and Sungmin were then placed in another project group with ten other male trainees, Super Junior 05, the first generation of rotational boy band Super Junior.

== Career ==
=== 2005–2006: Debut with Super Junior ===
Eunhyuk officially debuted as part of 12-member project group Super Junior 05 on November 6, 2005 on SBS's music programme Popular Songs, where the group performed their first single, "Twins (Knock Out)". Their debut album SuperJunior05 (Twins) was released a month later on December 5, 2005 and debuted at #3 on the monthly MIAK K-pop album charts.

In March 2006, SM Entertainment began to recruit new members for the next Super Junior generation. However, plans changed and the company declared a halt in forming future Super Junior generations. Following the addition of thirteenth member Kyuhyun, the group dropped the suffix "05" and became officially credited as Super Junior.

The re-polished group's first CD single "U" was released on June 7, 2006, which was their most successful single until the release of "Sorry, Sorry" in March 2009. Through their first official album, Eunhyuk helped produce as a lyricist and wrote the rap lyrics for a majority of Super Junior's songs. The rap lyrics to "Show Me Your Love" from the winter single with TVXQ was written by him, along with Heechul and Shindong, and "One Love", which became his solo performance in Super Junior's first concert, Super Show.

=== 2006–2009: MC-ing, sub-groups, variety shows ===
Eunhyuk was partnered with bandmate Leeteuk as radio DJs for KBS Super Junior's Kiss The Radio (aka SUKIRA) starting on August 21, 2006. With the exception of four months from March to June 2011, where bandmate Yesung temporarily replaced Eunhyuk, while he was away on promotional activities for Super Junior-M's third EP Perfection.

Eunhyuk replaced Kangin as MC on Mnet's music programme M! Countdown in late 2006. He hosted with bandmates Leeteuk and Shindong for two years and four months. In February 2007, Eunhyuk was placed in the trot-singing sub group Super Junior-T and released the single Rokkugo. A year later, he became a member of Super Junior-H.

From 2009, along with Leeteuk and Shindong, Eunhyuk was cast as a panel for Star King. In the midst of Super Junior's growing popularity through their 3rd studio album Sorry, Sorry, Eunhyuk became a variety member of Strong Heart, where they hosted special segment, Boom Academy with comedian Boom. He became a member on KBS' Dream Team, an athletic competition show and guested on Intimate Note, Fantasy Couple, Miracle and Introduce The Star's Friend. Super Junior's prominence nationally and overseas lead them to their second concert tour, Super Show II and line-ups in 2009 Asia Song Festival, Dream Concert, and premium live events in Japan, Singapore, and Thailand. It was then that Sorry, Sorry became critically and commercially successful hit in Asia; the first occasion in which the group won top honor at all of the local end-of-the-year music awards.

=== 2010–2011: Musical theatre and album releases ===
On February 26, 2010, Eunhyuk was diagnosed with H1N1 influenza, but was set to appear as a guest at label mate Girls' Generation's Into the New World encore concert in Seoul, hence had to pull out and was replaced by bandmates Leeteuk and Heechul. Super Junior released their 4th studio album, Bonamana, with similar success in Korea, sweeping awards in music programs after the release date. Their follow-up song, Boom Boom, was choreographed by Eunhyuk and performed on music programs Inkigayo and Music Core. On October 8, 2010, the digital single 'Angel' for HARU OST was released, with Eunhyuk featuring a rap verse.

In 2011, Eunhyuk, along with Sungmin was placed two new members of Super Junior-M. On September 27, 2011, he along with Yesung and Shindong filled in for bandmate Heechul, who enlisted for mandatory military service on September 1, during the performance on Music Bank and Show! Music Core of Kim Jang-hoon latest single, "Breakups are So Like Me". Heechul is featured in the song and starred in the music video, which was completed the day before he enlisted. Mr. Simple, Super Junior's award-winning 5th studio album, was promoted heavily with Eunhyuk participating in much of the album's production through choreography, and rap lyrics for the track, Oops. The album sold over 500,000 units and won the Disk Daesang Award at the 26th Golden Disk Awards and 21st Seoul Music Awards, as well as Album of the year at the 13th Mnet Asian Music Awards. The album is listed as the 2nd best-selling album as of the year 2011.

In November, Eunhyuk made his musical theatre debut in Fame, where he played Tyrone Jackson, along with Tiffany of Girls' Generation, Son Ho Young, Lina of The Grace and Kim Jung Mo of TRAX. It was on at the Woori Financial Art Hall from November 25, 2011, to January 29, 2012. It was announced on November 30, 2011, that after five years, he and Leeteuk would leave Super Junior's Kiss the Radio and was replaced by fellow members, Sungmin and Ryeowook on December 4, 2011.

=== 2011–2012: Oppa, Oppa and comeback with Super Junior ===
On December 16, 2011, Eunhyuk and Donghae released digital single Oppa, Oppa, where they first performed it at Super Junior's Super Show 4 Seoul concert on November 19, 2011. This marks the first release of their collaborations. The single was also released in Japanese with an original Japanese music video on April 4, 2012. On the day of its release, it reached number two on Oricon Daily Chart with 42,114 copies sold. While also preparing for Super Junior's first world tour Super Show 4, the pair held a fan meeting, Premium Mini Live Event, in support of the single on April 11 at Shibuya-AX, Tokyo.

Eunhyuk is MC for MBC every1's Super Junior Foresight, along with fellow members Leeteuk, Kyuhyun, Yesung and Shindong. From March 23, 2012, he took over as MC for the last three live shows of singing-survival program Great Birth 2, better known as MBC Star Audition, on MBC. As of the April 10, 2012 broadcast, following the change in MCs and the departure of Shindong from Strong Heart, the show was re-vamped with Leeteuk and Eunhyuk billed as two of the 'six-fixed guests'.

In June 2012, Eunhyuk reunited with his Super Junior bandmates for their sixth studio album, Sexy, Free & Single released on July 4. On June 21, 2012, the first teaser photo of Eunhyuk was released showing him in a white shirt, blue jeans, styled with a mullet-like hairstyle and blindfolded with white and pink flowers. In October SM Entertainment and Hyundai partnered up to release the "Maxstep" featuring Eunhyuk and other SM artists Super Junior-M's Henry Lau, SHINee's Lee Taemin, EXO-K's Kai, EXO-M's Luhan and Girl's Generation's Hyoyeon. The group became the official dance unit; Younique Unit. The official cover of Zedd's Spectrum was released via SBS Gayo Daejeon held on December 29, 2012, with Eunhyuk featuring. The single was performed by the members of SM The Performance and also included Donghae, along with TVXQ's Yunho, Shinee's Taemin and Minho and EXO's Kai and Lay.

=== 2013–2014: Comebacks with Super Junior-M, concerts, mini-albums ===
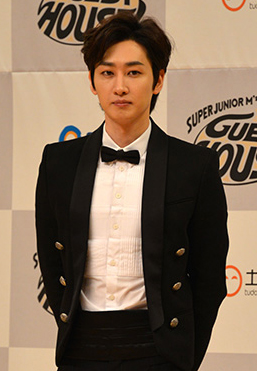
Eunhyuk during SJM's Guest House Press Conference in 2014

On January 7, 2013, Super Junior-M released their second album, Break Down, along with the music video for the lead single of the same name. A press conference took place in Beijing on January 7. They promoted the album in China. After returning to Korea, Eunhyuk heavily participated in variety shows, Come to Play (놀러와) and Barefooted Friends. Because of conflicting schedules due to Super Show 5: World Tour, Eunhyuk withdrew from both programs. Super Junior held 28 shows in total from March 2013 to February 2014, and toured in North America, South America, Europe and Asia.

In the midst of concerts, Eunhyuk returned to the studio for album recording. He and Donghae released I Wanna Dance on June 19, 2013, in Japan. The single peaked at #3 on both the Gaon and Oricon charts. Still You, the follow-up single, was released on December 18, 2013. Donghae & Eunhyuk then debuted their first studio album, Ride Me, on February 26, 2014, under Avex Trax. The song became the main theme of the Japanese TV show, 'Sukkiri' (爽快情報バラエティー スッキリ!!).

Eunhyuk returned to Super Junior-M promotions via Swing. The EP consists of six songs, which were released for digital download on March 21, 2014, in China and Taiwan by S.M. Entertainment. The group released the album in Korean music sites, such as MelOn, genie, Naver music and more, on March 31, 2014, and promoted on Korean music programs.

The first Japanese tour for sub-group Donghae & Eunhyuk, Super Junior D&E The 1st Japan Tour, kicked off in Nagoya on March 4, 2014. After touring numerous cities, he participated in a dance project with Beat Burger, entitled "Beat Burger Project x Eunhyuk". In August, the project released an official video, choreographed to Yoo Young Jin's song "Mo Jazzy".

In August 2014, it was announced that Eunhyuk and Super Junior would be making their comeback with the group's seventh album, Mamacita which was released online on August 29 and in stores on September 1. On the album, Eunhyuk contributed choreography to their second lead single, 'Shirt,' which received praises from Allkpop, "The track is one of the most energetic on the album beyond the title track." The group made their official comeback performance on the Korean music show Music Bank with the songs "Shirt" and "Mamacita" on August 29 and continued their promotions on Music Core, Inkigayo and M! Countdown while preparing for their new world tour Super Show 6 which would open on September 19 on Seoul.

=== 2015: Sub-group, main group comeback, military enlistment ===
In February 2015, Donghae & Eunhyuk first Korean album, The Beat Goes On was released on March 9, 2015. The album had seven tracks, including the title song, "Growing Pains". On April 1, Donghae & Eunhyuk released first Japanese mini-EP called Present, which contained a total of eight songs including the lead title "Saturday Night". The duo kicked off its concert tour "Super Junior D&E The 2nd Japan Tour" and "Super Junior-D&E Asia Tour" during April to August.

Super Junior special album, Devil was released on 16 July 2015 to celebrate the group's 10th anniversary. Eunhyuk participated in writing lyrics for song, "Alright".

On September 2, 2015, SM Entertainment announced that Eunhyuk enlisted for active duty military service on October 13, 2015.

=== 2017–present: Comeback to music and television, and debut EP ===
Eunhyuk was discharged on July 12, 2017. After his discharge from his enlistment, Eunhyuk participated in the songs writing and composing for Super Junior's 8th Album "Play", which was released on the group's 12th anniversary.

In November 2017, Eunhyuk and Donghae announced their comeback in Japan as the duo group Super Junior D&E.

Eunhyuk began to serve as the concert director of his group's concert tours through Super Show 7, Super Show 7S, and the subunit Super Junior-D&E's The D&E.

Starting in January 2018, Eunhyuk and his Super Junior members started a new variety program called "Super Junior's Super TV".

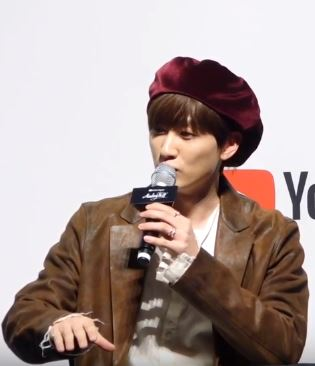
Eunhyuk during Analog Trip press conference in September 2019

On May 22, 2020, Super Junior held their press conference for their web reality show on V Live with Leeteuk as the main host. Fans were wondering why Eunhyuk was absent, and Shindong spoke up, saying, "Eunhyuk couldn't come because of personal reasons."

He is the current host of popular variety show, Weekly Idol, alongside Hwang Kwanghee, since April 2020.

On July 14, 2023, it was announced that Eunhyuk, with his fellow band members Donghae and Kyuhyun, had decided not to renew their contracts with SM, but will continue group activity with Super Junior.

On January 16, 2025, Eunhyuk uploaded the track list for his debut EP, Explorer, which was released on January 27.

== Personal life ==
=== Car accident ===
On April 19, 2007, almost two months after Super Junior-T's release of their first single "Rokuko", Eunhyuk was involved in a car accident, along with Shindong, Leeteuk, Kyuhyun, and two managers, when returning home following a recording of the radio show Super Junior Kiss the Radio. While they were on the highway, the front left tire burst as the driver was switching lanes and the van ran into the guard rail/median on the driver's side and skidded for about 30 metres. At some point, the momentum caused the van to flip over on its right side. While Shindong and Eunhyuk suffered minor injuries, Leeteuk and Kyuhyun sustained more serious injuries, which required both to be hospitalized.

=== Philanthropy ===
On April 4, 2023, Eunhyuk donated 40,000,000 won to The Green Umbrella Children's Foundation, aiming to help children and adolescents who care for family members who take the lead while caring for sick family members in need of care.

== Discography ==
=== Extended plays ===
| Title | Details | Peak chart positions | | Sales |
| Title | Details | KOR | JPN | Sales |
|---|---|---|---|---|
| Explorer | Released: January 27, 2025; Label: ODE Entertainment; Formats: CD, digital download, streaming | 1 | — | KOR: 125,263 |
| Timescape | Released: February 12, 2025; Label: World Entertainment; Formats: CD, digital download, streaming | — | 16 | JPN: 1,933 |

=== Singles ===
| Title | Year | Peak chart positions | Sales (DL) | Album |
| Title | Year | KOR | Sales (DL) | Album |
|---|---|---|---|---|
| "Keuge Radioreul Kyeogo" (with The Koxx, Lee Hyun-woo, Choi Kang-hee, Danny Ahn and Leeteuk) | 2011 | — | | KBS Cool FM 46th anniversary |
| "Maxstep" (as part of Younique Unit) | 2012 | — | | PYL Younique Volume 1 |
| "Spectrum" (as part of SM The Performance) | 2012 | 43 | KOR: 58,298 | Non-album single |
| "Fly Day" (with Baek Ji-young, Sunmi, Davichi, Jueun, Jung Chae-yeon, Jin Se-yeon, NRG, MoonBin (Astro), MJ (Astro), Ooon, Jae Yong, Hee Cheon, Heedo, Gunmin, Moon Jong-up, Youngjae, The One, Johan Kim) | 2017 | — | | Fly Day |
| "Jjameso Naoneun Baibu (Charm of Life)" (with Heechul, Shindong and Solar) | 2017 | — | | Non-album single |
| "Eojeboda Oneul Deo Neol" | 2018 | — | | Secret Queen Makers Original Soundtrack |
| "Be" | 2021 | — (Note: Did not enter Gaon Digital Chart but peaked at number 7 on Gaon Download Chart) | | Countdown (Be ver.) |
| "Mañana (Our Drama)" (with Zhou Mi) | 2023 | — | | Non-album single |
| "Up n Down" | 2025 | 133 | | Explorer |
"—" denotes releases that did not chart or were not released in that region.

=== Japanese singles ===
| Title | Year | Album |
|---|---|---|
| "Like This" | 2025 | Timescape |

=== Other appearances ===
List of non-single guest appearances, showing year released and album name
| Title | Year | Album |
|---|---|---|
| "One Love" (with Yesung, Ryeowook and Kyuhyun) | 2008 | Super Show |
| "Jachebalgwang Boseongminam Lee Hyuk-jae" | 2013 | Super Show 4 |
| "So Cold" (with Donghae, Siwon and Henry) | 2015 | Super Show 5 |
| "Dear. Two" | 2015 | Super Show 6 |
| "Red Muhly" | 2021 | Countdown (Be ver.) |
| "Jet" (with Hyoyeon, Taeyong, Jaemin, Sungchan, Giselle and Winter) | 2022 | 2022 Winter SM Town: SMCU Palace |

== Lyrics and composition ==
| Year | Song | Artist | Album | Note |
|---|---|---|---|---|
| 2005 | "Over" | Super Junior | Twins | Rap Lyrics |
| 2005 | "L.O.V.E." | Super Junior | Twins | Rap Lyrics |
| 2005 | "Rock This House" | Super Junior | Twins | Rap Lyrics |
| 2005 | "Show Me Your Love" | TVXQ, Super Junior | Show Me Your Love | Rap Lyrics |
| 2006 | "U" | Super Junior | U – single | Rap Lyrics |
| 2007 | "Rokuko" | Super Junior-T | Rokuko | Rap Lyrics |
| 2007 | "Don't Go Away" | Super Junior-T | Rokuko | N/A |
| 2007 | "First Express" | Super Junior-T | Rokuko | Rap Lyrics |
| 2007 | "Kangin's Reckless Radio" | Super Junior | Logo Song | Rap Lyrics |
| 2007 | "Disco Drive" | Super Junior | Don't Don | N/A |
| 2007 | "Sapphire Blue" | Super Junior | Don't Don | Rap Lyrics |
| 2007 | "Mirror" | Super Junior | Don't Don | Rap Lyrics |
| 2007 | "You're My Endless Love" | Super Junior | Don't Don | Rap Lyrics |
| 2007 | "Song for You" | Super Junior | Don't Don | Rap Lyrics |
| 2007 | "I Am" | Super Junior | Don't Don | N/A |
| 2007 | "Marry U" | Super Junior | Don't Don | Rap Lyrics, Co-written |
| 2008 | "Pajama Party" | Super Junior-H | Cooking? Cooking! | Rap Lyrics |
| 2008 | "Sunny" | Super Junior-H | Cooking? Cooking! | Rap Lyrics, Co-written |
| 2008 | "Good Luck!!" | Super Junior-H | Cooking? Cooking! | Rap Lyrics |
| 2008 | One Love | Eunhyuk with Super Junior-K.R.Y. | Super Show | Written, Composed |
| 2009 | "Reset" | Super Junior | Sorry, Sorry | Rap Lyrics |
| 2009 | "She Wants It" | Super Junior | Sorry, Sorry | N/A |
| 2009 | "Shining Star" | Super Junior | Sorry, Sorry | Rap Lyrics |
| 2010 | "A Short Journey" | Super Junior | Bonamana | Co-written |
| 2010 | "No Other" | Super Junior | Bonamana | Rap Lyrics |
| 2010 | "Here We Go" | Super Junior | Bonamana | N/A |
| 2010 | "Shake It Up" | Super Junior | Bonamana | Rap Lyrics |
| 2010 | "Boom Boom" | Super Junior | Bonamana | Rap Lyrics, Choreography |
| 2011 | "Oops!" | Super Junior | A-CHa | Co-written |
| 2011 | "I Wanna Love You" | Super Junior; Donghae & Eunhyuk | Super Show 3 | N/A |
| 2012 | "Only U" | As One | Only U - single | Co-written |
| 2012 | "Gulliver" | Super Junior | Sexy, Free & Single | Lyrics |
| 2013 | "Say My Name" | Eunhyuk | Super Show 4 | N/A |
| 2013 | "So Cold" | Eunhyuk with Donghae, Siwon and Henry | Super Show 5 | Co-written |
| 2013 | "Still You" | Super Junior; Donghae & Eunhyuk | Still You - single | Rap Lyrics |
| 2014 | "Ride Me" | Super Junior; Donghae & Eunhyuk | Ride Me | Rap Lyrics |
| 2014 | "Dear. Two" | Eunhyuk | Super Show 6 | Rap Lyrics, Choreography |
| 2015 | "Love That I Need" | Super Junior; Donghae & Eunhyuk | The Beat Goes On (Special Edition) | Lyrics |
| 2015 | "Alright" | Super Junior | Devil | Lyrics |
| 2015 | "You Got It" | Eunhyuk with Leeteuk, Heechul, Yesung and Donghae | Magic | Lyrics |
| 2016 | "Darling U" | Yesung and Kang Seul-gi (Red Velvet) | Darling U - single | Co-written |
| 2017 | "One More Chance" | Super Junior | Play (8th Album) | Rap Lyrics |
| 2017 | "Scene Stealer" | Super Junior | Play (8th Album) | Lyrics |
| 2017 | "Good Day for a Good Day" | Super Junior | Play (8th Album) | Rap Lyrics |
| 2017 | "Girlfriend" | Super Junior | Play (8th Album) | Rap Lyrics |
| 2017 | "Spin Up!" | Super Junior | Play (8th Album) | Rap Lyrics |
| 2018 | "Lo Siento" | Super Junior | Replay (Play Repackage) | Rap Lyrics |
| 2018 | "Me & U" | Super Junior | Replay (Play Repackage) | Lyrics |
| 2018 | 'Bout You | Super Junior-D&E | 'Bout You | Lyrics |
| 2018 | "Illusion" | Eunhyuk | 'Bout You | Full Lyrics |
| 2018 | "Hot Babe" | Super Junior-D&E | Hot Babe | Lyrics |
| 2019 | "Dreamer" | Super Junior-D&E | DANGER | Lyrics |
| 2019 | "Sunrise (Korean Version)" | Super Junior-D&E | DANGER | Lyrics (co-written) |
| 2019 | "I Think I" | Super Junior | Time Slip | Rap lyrics |
| 2019 | "Game" | Super Junior | Time Slip | Rap lyrics |
| 2021 | "be" | Eunhyuk | be | Lyrics |
| 2021 | "Red Muhly" | Eunhyuk | be | Lyrics |
| 2021 | "ZERO" | Super Junior-D&E | Countdown | Lyrics (co-written) |
| 2021 | "Home" | Super Junior-D&E | Countdown | Lyrics (co-written) |
| 2021 | "Need U" | Super Junior-D&E | Need U | Lyrics (co-written) |
| 2022 | "Always" | Super Junior | The Road: Keep on Going | Lyrics |

== Filmography ==
=== Film ===
| Year | Title | Role | Notes | Ref. |
|---|---|---|---|---|
| 2007 | Attack on the Pin-Up Boys | | | |
| 2011 | Super Show 3 3D | | screening in select theatres | |
| 2012 | I AM. | | | |
| 2012 | SMTOWN Live in Tokyo Special Edition in 3D | | | |
| 2013 | Super Show 4 3D | | screening in select theatres | |
| 2015 | SM Town The Stage | | | |

=== Television series ===
| Year | Title | Role | Notes | Ref. |
|---|---|---|---|---|
| 2005–2006 | Rainbow Romance | | Cameo | |
| 2011 | Dream High | | Cameo (episode 13) | |

=== Web series ===
| Year | Title | Role | Notes | Ref. |
|---|---|---|---|---|
| 2021 | ONAIR - Secret Contract | | Cameo | |

=== Television shows ===
| Year | Title | Role | Notes | Ref. |
|---|---|---|---|---|
| 2007 – 2008 | M! Countdown | Co-Hosted | with Leeteuk & Shindong | |
| 2009 | Human Network Miracle | Host | | |
| 2009 | Lord of the Rings | Host | | |
| 2009 – 2011 | Star King | Panel | | |
| 2009 – 2011 | Let's Go! Dream Team Season 2 | Full-Season Competitor | | |
| 2009 – 2013 | Strong Heart | Host | Season 1 | |
| 2009 – 2013 | Barefooted Friends | Cast | | |
| 2010 – 2012 | Star Audition : The Great Birth | Host | Season 1–2 | |
| 2012 | 2012 Idol Star Athletics Championship | Host | | |
| 2013 | Come to Play: Strange Mountain Cabin | Host | with Yoo Jae-suk, Eun Ji-won | |
| 2015 | Animals | Cast | Ok Farm | |
| 2015 | Shin Dong-yup’s Bachelor Party | Cast | with Kangin | |
| 2017 | Oppa Thinking | Cast | Team 1 | |
| 2018 | WHYNOT – The Dancer | Cast | | |
| 2018 | Looking For Trouble | Cast | Season 2 | |
| 2018 – 2019 | Under Nineteen | Performance Director | | |
| 2020 | Top 10 Student | Panel | | |
| 2020 | Eunhyuk's Clothing | Host | | |
| 2020–2023 | Weekly Idol | Host | with Hwang Kwang-hee | |
| 2021–present | Mr. House Husband 2 | Cast Member | | |
| 2021 | Job Estate | Cast Member | with Kang Ho-dong and Boo Seung-kwan | |
| 2021 | Back to the Idol 2 | Host | with Minhyuk | |
| 2022 | Street Man Fighter | Judge | | |
| 2022–2023 | Korea After School: Field Trip | Host | Season 1–2 | |
| 2024 | Scool | Host | with Yuju, Lee Hong-gi, Leeteuk, Choi Young-joon, Show Lo & Shou | |

=== Web shows ===
| Year | Title | Role | Notes | Ref. |
|---|---|---|---|---|
| 2019 | Analog Trip | Cast Member | | |
| 2020 | Back to the Idol | Host | alongside Minhyuk | |
| 2021–2022 | Idol Dictation Contest | Cast member | Season 1 & 2 | |
| 2023 | Knight of the Lamp | Cast member | with Leeteuk, Donghae, Shindong, Ryeowook and Kyuhyun | |

=== Hosting ===
| Year | Title | Notes | Ref. |
|---|---|---|---|
| 2009 | 12th Girl Scout Opening Ceremony | with Leeteuk | |
| 2012 | Ulsan Summer Festival | broadcast under Music Core | |
| 2013 | 10th Asia Song Festival | with Ok Taec-yeon and Kris Wu | |
| 2014 | 23rd Seoul Music Awards | | |
| 2014 | 20th Dream Concert | with Kangin, Baek Jin-hee | |
| 2020 | 26th Dream Concert | with Cha Eun Woo, Lia (Itzy) | |

=== Radio shows ===
| Year | Title | Role | Notes | Ref. |
|---|---|---|---|---|
| 2006–2011 | Super Junior Kiss the Radio | Host | | |
| 2021–2023 | D&E Show | Host | with Donghae | |

== Musical theatre ==
| Year | Title | Role | Notes | Ref. |
|---|---|---|---|---|
| 2011–2012 | Fame | Tyrone Jackson | 25 November 2011 to 29 January 2012 | |
| 2021 | Altar Boys | | Musical theater director | |

== Awards and nominations ==
Name of the award ceremony, year presented, category, nominee of the award, and the result of the nomination
| Award ceremony | Year | Category | Nominee / Work | Result | Ref. |
|---|---|---|---|---|---|
| Gaon Weibo Chart Awards | 2014 | Gaon Weibo Chart Individual Award | Eunhyuk | Won | |
| Golden Ticket Awards | 2012 | Musical Up and Comer Award | Fame | Nominated | |
| KBS Entertainment Awards | 2021 | Best Teamwork Award | Mr. House Husband 2 | Won | |
| SBS Entertainment Awards | 2009 | Best Newcomer | Strong Heart, Star King | Won | |
| The Fact Music Awards | 2019 | FAN N Star Hall of Fame (Artist) | Eunhyuk | Won | |
