= Kim Ryeo-wook =

South Korean singer-songwriter (born 1987)

Ryeowook
- 김려욱
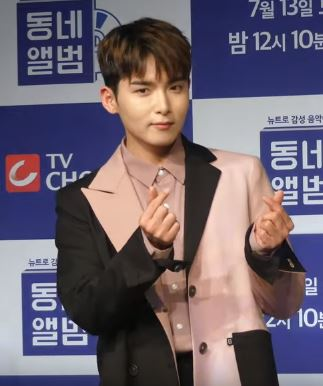
- Ryeowook in July 2019
- Born: 21 June 1987 (age 39); Incheon, South Korea
- Occupations: Singer; songwriter; actor; radio personality
- Spouse: Ari (m. 2024)
- Musical career
- Genres: K-pop; R&B; ballad
- Instruments: Vocals; piano
- Years active: 2005–present
- Labels: Label SJ; SM
- Member of: Super Junior; KRY; Super Junior-M; SM Town
- Website: Official website

Korean name
- Hangul: 김려욱
- Hanja: 金厲旭
- RR: Gim Ryeouk
- MR: Kim Ryŏuk

Signature
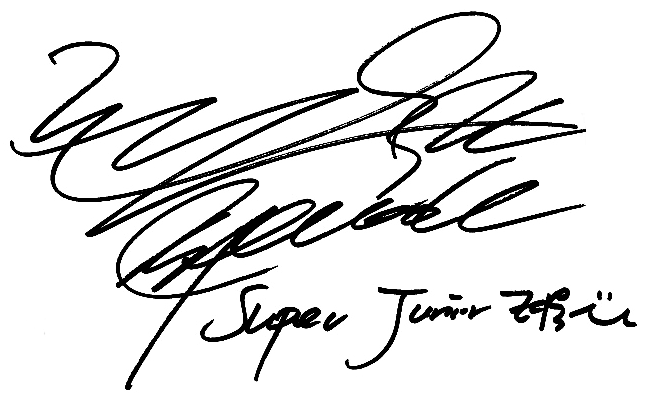

Kim Ryeo-wook (born 21 June 1987), better known by the mononym Ryeowook, is a South Korean singer, songwriter, and musical actor. He is best known as a member of boy group Super Junior and its subgroups, Super Junior-K.R.Y. and Super Junior-M. Along with four other Super Junior members, he is one of the first Korean artists to appear on Chinese postage stamps. He began a solo career in 2016 with his first EP The Little Prince.

== Career ==
=== Pre-debut ===
Ryeowook was discovered through the CMB Youth ChinChin Festival in 2004 and signed a contract with SM Entertainment soon afterwards, impressing the judges with his singing talent. Before Kyuhyun was added in 2006, Ryeowook was the last to join Super Junior several weeks before their debut in 2005.

=== 2006–2009: Debut with Super Junior, K.R.Y and Super Junior-M ===
Ryeowook made his debut as part of the 12-member project group Super Junior 05 on 6 November 2005 on SBS' music programme Popular Songs, performing their first single, "Twins (Knock Out)". Their debut album SuperJunior05 (Twins) was released a month later on 5 December 2005 and debuted at number three on the monthly MIAK K-pop album charts.

In late 2006, Ryeowook, along with fellow Super Junior members Kyuhyun and Yesung, formed a subgroup named Super Junior K.R.Y., a group specializing in R&B ballads. The trio debuted on 5 November 2006 on KBS' Music Bank, performing the Hyena soundtrack called "The One I Love". Ryeowook made his acting debut in 2007 in the film Attack on the Pin-Up Boys, a high-school comedy/mystery film, in which he plays the eccentric vice president of the student council. He was nominated for Best Supporting Actor and Best Comedic Performance at the Korean Movie Awards.

In April 2008, he was put into seven-member sub-group Super Junior-M, a Mandopop subgroup of Super Junior for the Chinese music industry. They debuted in China at the 8th Annual Music Chart Awards at the same time as the release of their first music video, "U", on 8 April 2008. This was followed by the release of the debut Chinese-language studio album Me in selected provinces in China on 23 April and 2 May in Taiwan.

In November 2012, Super Junior K.R.Y. held a concert tour in Japan, Super Junior K.R.Y. Special Winter Concert. They announced that they would be releasing their first single six years after debut. The teaser for Promise You was released on 21 November 2012, followed by the single on 23 January 2013. It debuted at number two on the Oricon's daily singles chart.

=== 2009–2018: Solo activities ===
Ryeowook's first composition to be officially released was "Love U More", in the repackaged Sorry, Sorry Version C. Ryeowook made his musical theatre debut in Temptation of Wolves alongside Park Hyung-sik of ZE:A and Lim Jeong-hee. It ran from 14 July to 30 October 2011 at the COEX Artium.

On 16 and 23 June, following the footsteps of bandmates Yesung and Kyuhyun, Ryeowook joined KBS' Immortal Songs 2 with Sunggyu of Infinite, where singers render their own versions of songs from music legends, and winners are selected by voting. He took first place in 11 August episode where singers Lee Sang-woo and Lee Sang-eun were guests. He recorded his last episode on 16 August, which was broadcast on 25 August.

=== 2016–present: Solo debut ===
Ryeowook made his solo debut on 28 January 2016.

Ryeowook's debut solo album's title is The Little Prince. The release of The Little Prince was anticipated not only as Ryeowook's first official solo album since his debut 11 years ago but also because it was the first release under Super Junior's own label, Label SJ, established by SM Entertainment in 2015 during the group's 10th anniversary. The title track, bearing the same name as the album, is a ballad inspired by French author Antoine de Saint-Exupéry's novel The Little Prince. The title track "The Little Prince" is a ballad song and a conversation between a man in pain from love and The Little Prince.

In addition to Ryeowook's solo promotions and album release, he held his first solo concert through SMTOWN's The Agit series called "Ever Lasting Star - RyeoWook" from 19 February until 21 February at the SMTOWN's Coex Artium in Samseong-dong, Seoul.

On 2 January 2019, Ryeowook released his second solo album, Drunk on Love.

On 3 May 2022, Ryeowook released his third solo album A Wild Rose.

== Artistry ==
With three octaves in his range, Ryeowook is a lyric tenor. He has also been known for his frequent usage of falsettos. South Korean operatic singer Sumi Jo, whom he collaborated with for a formal performance, praised his musicianship. She called his skills "outstanding" and acknowledged his professionalism on stage.

With his second EP, Drunk on Love, Young Post noticed a variety of genres and styles interpolated: from a pop ballad-like style; jazz; R&B; and to more of a style reminiscing of lounge music.

== Personal life ==
=== Education ===
Ryeowook received his secondary education from Deokwon Arts High School and graduated in February 2006. The same year, he entered Inha University and graduated on 24 February 2012, with a major in theater and film studies.

=== Military service ===
Ryeowook enlisted for his military service on 11 October 2016, and was discharged on 10 July 2018.

=== Marriage ===
Ryeowook first publicly acknowledged his relationship with Ari, a former member of Tahiti, in 2020. On 29 March 2024, Ryeowook announced their forthcoming marriage through an Instagram post, where he conveyed the news to his fans via a handwritten letter. The couple married on 26 May 2024.

== Discography ==
=== Extended plays ===
Title	Details	Peak chart positions			Sales
Title	Details	KOR	JPN	US World	Sales
The Little Prince	Released: 28 January 2016; Label: SM Entertainment; Formats: CD, digital download	1	—	5	KOR: 44,556
Drunk on Love	Released: 2 January 2019; Label: SM Entertainment; Formats: CD, digital download; Track listing: 1. "I'm Not Over You" (너에게); 2. "One and Only" (우리의 거리); 3. "Drunk in the Morning" (취해); 4. "Without You"; 5. "Something Good"; 6. "Sugar"; 7. "The 2nd Story" (파란별)	2	—	—	KOR: 25,821
A Wild Rose	Released: 3 May 2022; Label: SM Entertainment; Formats: CD, digital download; Track listing: 1. "Bluebird" (파랑새); 2. "My Dear"; 3. "Everlasting Love" (찬란한 나의 그대); 4. "Crying"; 5. "To Me" (나에게); 6. "Angel's Wing"; 7. "Hiding Words" (오늘만은)	7	14	—	KOR: 28,232; JPN: 1,498 (Phy.)
"—" denotes releases that did not chart or were not released in that region.

=== Single albums ===
Title	Details	Peak chart positions	Sales
Title	Details	KOR	Sales
Runaway	Released: 23 June 2026; Label: SM Entertainment; Formats: CD, digital download	7	KOR: 27,306

=== Singles ===
Title	Year	Peak chart positions		Sales (DL)	Album
Title	Year	KOR	JPN	Sales (DL)	Album
"The Little Prince"	2016	16	—	KOR: 279,574+	The Little Prince
"One and Only"	2018	—	—		Drunk on Love
"I'm Not Over You"	2019	—	—		Drunk on Love
"Drunk in the Morning"	2019	—	—		Drunk on Love
"Hiding Words" (오늘만은)	2022	— (Note: "Hiding Words" did not enter the Gaon Digital Chart, but debuted at number 83 on the Gaon Download Chart.)	—		A Wild Rose
"Bluebird" (파랑새)	2022	—	—		A Wild Rose
"It's Okay"	2023	—	—		Non-album single
"Lingering"	2023	—	—		Non-album single
"Runaway"	2026	—	—		Runaway
Japanese
"Sakura no Hana ga Sakukoro" (桜の花が咲く頃)	2019	—	22	JPN: 5,341+	Non-album single
"Akane Iro ni Somaru Sora no Shita" (茜色に染まる空の下)	2022	—	—		Non-album single
"僕のほし"	2026	—	—		Non-album single
"—" denotes releases that did not chart or were not released in that region.

=== Collaboration singles ===
Title	Year	Peak chart positions		Album
Title	Year	KOR	US World	Album
"Falling in Love with a Friend" (with Beige)	2010	49	—	Non-album single
"Cosmic" (with Bada)	2016	—	—	SM Station Season 1
"Starry Night" (with Zhou Mi)	2020	—	23	Non-album single
"—" denotes releases that did not chart or were not released in that region.

=== Soundtrack appearances ===
Title	Year	Peak chart positions		Sales (DL)	Album
Title	Year	KOR	KOR Hot.	Sales (DL)	Album
"Smile Again"	2010	—	—	—N/a	Home Sweet Home OST
"Biting My Lips" (with Kyuhyun, Sungmin)	2010	60	—	—N/a	The President OST
"Just Like Now" (with Donghae)	2010	97	—	—N/a	It's Okay, Daddy's Girl OST
"If You Love Me More"	2011	76	—	KOR: 64,801	Spy Myung-wol OST
"Start of Something New" (with Luna)	2013	—	—	—N/a	High School Musical OST
"Maybe Tomorrow"	2013	—	92	—N/a	The Queen's Classroom OST
"A Love Story of Country-side Boy"	2019	—	—	—N/a	Neighbourhood Album Chung Ju OST
"Starry Night"	2021	—	—	—N/a	Youth of May OST
"Goodbye"	2022	—	—	—N/a	Everything Was Misunderstanding
"—" denotes releases that did not chart or were not released in that region.

=== Other charted songs ===
Title	Year	Peak chart positions	Sales (DL)	Album
Title	Year	KOR	Sales (DL)	Album
"Like a Star"	2016	141	KOR: 17,532	The Little Prince
"People You May Know"	2016	161	KOR: 15,523	The Little Prince
"Poom"	2016	166	KOR: 15,136	The Little Prince
"Hello"	2016	174	KOR: 13,402	The Little Prince
"Foxy Girl"	2016	189	KOR: 12,799	The Little Prince

=== Other appearances ===
List of non-single guest appearances, showing year released and album name
Title	Year	Album
"Wish" (with TVXQ and Kyuhyun)	2008	Mirotic
"Where You Are" (with Onew, Doyoung, Chenle and Xiaojun)	2022	2022 Winter SM Town: SMCU Palace

=== Songwriting credits ===
All song credits are adapted from the Korea Music Copyright Association's (KOMCA) database unless noted otherwise.

Year	Song	Album	Artist(s)	Lyrics		Music	
Year	Song	Album	Artist(s)	Credit	With	Credit	With
2009	"Love U More"	Sorry, Sorry (Repackage)	Super Junior	Yes	Lee Sung-min	Yes	—
2016	"Poom"	The Little Prince	Ryeowook	Yes	G-High, Asher Park	No	
2019	"Drunk in the Morning"	Drunk on Love	Ryeowook	Yes	Jo Yoon-kyung, Cheon Song-yi, Kim Ra-hee, Lauren Dyson, Ottestad Per Kristian, Justin Gray	No	
2019	"The 2nd Story"	Drunk on Love	Ryeowook	Yes	—	No	

== Filmography ==
=== Film ===
Year	Title	Role
2007	Attack on the Pin-Up Boys	Student body vice president
2010	Super Show 3 3D	Himself
2012	I AM. - SM Town Live World Tour in Madison Square Garden	Himself
2013	Super Show 4 3D	Himself

=== Television ===
Year	Title	Role	Notes	Ref.
2014–2015	Super Idol Chart Show	Host		
2015	The Producers	DJ	Cameo in episode 9	
2015	The Friends in Switzerland	Cast member	With Leeteuk	
2015–2016	Enter-K	Host		
2016	Very Private TV	Cast member		
2016	Celebrity Bromance	Cast member	Season 3, with Park Hyung-sik	
2016, 2019	King of Mask Singer	Contestant		
2018	Sell to Return	Member of Thailand team	Filling in for Leeteuk	
2018	Global Request Show: A Song For You	Host	Season 5	
2019	Neighbourhood Album	Host	Season 2	
2021	ONAIR - Secret Contract	DJ Aron / Ahn Noo-ri		

=== Web shows ===
Year	Title	Role	Notes	Ref.
2023	Knight of the Lamp	Cast Member	with Leeteuk, Donghae, Eunhyuk, shindong and Kyuhyun	

=== Musical/Theatre ===
Year	Title	Role	Ref.
2011	Neukdaeui Yuhok (lit. Temptation of wolves)	Jung Tae-sung	
2013	High School Musical	Troy Bolton	
2014–2015	Yeosinnimi Bogogyesyeo (lit. Goddess is watching)	Ryu Sun-ho	
2015	Agatha	Raymond	
2015–2016	The Curious Incident of the Dog in the Night-Time	Christopher	
2018–2020	Gwangyeom sonata (Note: Adaptation of the novel of the same name written by Kim Dong-in, often translated into English as Sonata Appassionata)	J	
2021	Mary Shelley	Polidori	
2022	Fan Letter	Jung Se-hun	

== Awards and nominations ==
Year	Award	Category	Nominated work	Result	Ref.
2007	Korean Movie Awards	Best Supporting Actor	Attack on the Pin-Up Boys	Nominated	
2007	Korean Movie Awards	Best Comedic Performance	Attack on the Pin-Up Boys	Nominated	
2012	2011 Golden Ticket Awards	Musical Up and Comer Award	Temptation of the Wolves	Nominated	
2015	KBS Entertainment Awards	Radio DJ Award	Kiss The Radio	Won	
