= Cho Kyu-hyun discography =

Musical output of South Korean singer Cho Kyu-hyun

Kyuhyun discography
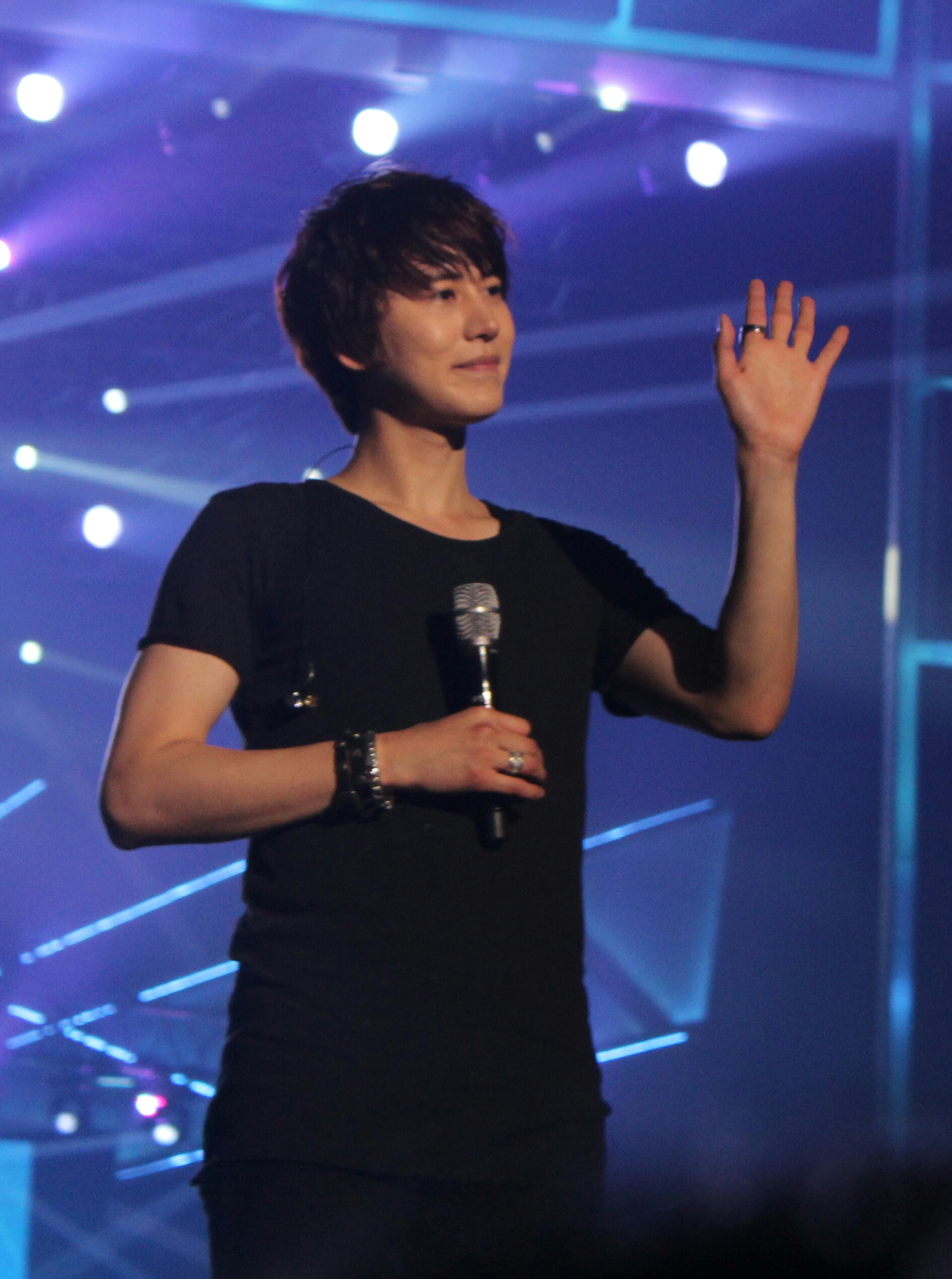
- Kyuhyun during Super Show 5 in Manila
- Studio albums: 2
- EPs: 7
- Singles: 16
- Music videos: 13
- Single albums: 2
- Soundtrack appearances: 24
- Promotional singles: 8

Cho Kyu-hyun (better known by his mononym Kyuhyun) is a South Korean singer. His discography consists of two studio albums, seven extended plays, two single albums, fourteen singles, three promotional singles, and twenty one soundtrack songs. He debuted as a member of South Korean boy band Super Junior in 2006 and subsequently became a part of its subgroup Super Junior-K.R.Y. in 2006 and Super Junior-M in 2008 as well as SM Entertainment's group SM the Ballad in 2010.

== Albums ==
=== Studio albums ===
List of studio albums, with selected details, chart positions and sales
Title	Details	Peak chart positions		Sales
Title	Details	KOR	JPN	Sales
One Voice	Released: February 8, 2017 (JPN); Label: Avex Trax; Formats: CD, digital download	—	1	JPN: 28,491
Colors	Released: November 27, 2024 (KOR); Label: Antenna; Formats: CD, digital download	11	22	KOR: 78,976

=== Single albums ===
List of single albums, with selected details, chart positions and sales
Title	Details	Peak chart positions	Sales
Title	Details	KOR	Sales
Goodbye for Now	Released: May 24, 2017; Label: SM Entertainment; Formats: CD, digital download	3	KOR: 25,997
The Day We Meet Again	Released: May 20, 2019; Label: SM Entertainment; Formats: CD, Kihno, digital download	3	KOR: 52,386

== Extended plays ==
List of extended plays, with selected details, chart positions and sales
Title	Details	Peak chart positions			Sales
Title	Details	KOR	JPN	US World	Sales
At Gwanghwamun	Released: November 13, 2014; Label: SM Entertainment; Formats: CD, digital download	1	41	2	KOR: 71,169
Fall, Once Again	Released: October 15, 2015; Label: SM Entertainment; Formats: CD, digital download	1	38	—	KOR: 45,387
Waiting, Still	Released: November 10, 2016; Label: SM Entertainment; Formats: CD, digital download	5	41	—	KOR: 44,567; JPN: 1,964
Love Story (4 Season Project 季)	Released: January 25, 2022; Label: SM Entertainment; Formats: CD, digital download	4	20	—	KOR: 55,774; JPN: 1,931 (Phy.)
Restart	Released: January 9, 2024; Label: Antenna; Formats: CD, digital download	8	18	—	KOR: 57,856; JPN: 3,347 (Phy.)
The Classic	Released: November 20, 2025; Label: Antenna; Formats: CD, digital download	7	—	—	KOR: 37,249
Continue	Released: November 11, 2026; Label: Antenna; Formats: CD, digital download	17	—	—	KOR: 52,628

== Singles ==
=== As lead artist ===
Title	Year	Peak chart positions	Sales (Note: Sales figures for tracks are based on digital downloads, except noted.; Gaon Music Chart no longer releases download sales figures from January 2018 onwards.)	Album
Title	Year	KOR	Sales	Album
"At Gwanghwamun" (광화문에서)	2014	2	KOR: 2,500,000+	At Gwanghwamun
"A Million Pieces" (밀리언조각)	2015	6	KOR: 496,844+	Fall, Once Again
"The Day We Felt Distance" (멀어지던 날)	2015	14	KOR: 300,112+	Non-album singles
"Celebration: Kimi ni Kakeru Hashi" (Celebration～君に架ける橋～)	2016	5	JPN: 31,302 (Phy.)	Non-album singles
"Blah Blah" (블라블라)	2016	18	KOR: 454,233+	Waiting, Still
"Still" (여전히 아늑해)	2016	24	KOR: 387,133+	Waiting, Still
"Goodbye for Now" (다시 만나는 날)	2017	18	KOR: 200,138+	Goodbye for Now
"Time with You" (그게 좋은거야)	2019	98	—N/a	Non-album single
"Aewol-ri" (애월리)	2019	117	—N/a	The Day We Meet Again
"Dreaming"	2020	112	—N/a	Love Story (4 Season Project 季)
"Daystar" (내 마음을 누르는 일)	2020	91	—N/a	Love Story (4 Season Project 季)
"Moving On" (마지막 날에)	2021	30	—N/a	Love Story (4 Season Project 季)
"Coffee" (커피)	2021	87	—N/a	Love Story (4 Season Project 季)
"Together" (투게더)	2021	106	—N/a	Love Story (4 Season Project 季)
"Love Story" (연애소설)	2022	92	—N/a	Love Story (4 Season Project 季)
"The Story Behind" (그렇지 않아)	2024	105	—N/a	Restart
"Unending Days"	2024	— (Note: "Unending Days" did not enter Circle Digital Chart but peaked at number 21 on Circle Download Chart)	—N/a	Colors
"Like First Snow" (첫눈처럼)	2025	— (Note: "Like First Snow" did not enter Circle Digital Chart but peaked at number 14 on Circle Download Chart)	—N/a	The Classic
"—" denotes songs that did not chart.

=== As featured artist ===
List of singles as featured artist, with selected chart positions, showing year released and album name
Title	Year	Peak chart positions	Sales	Album
Title	Year	KOR	Sales	Album
"Just For One Day" (하루만) (The Grace featuring Kyuhyun)	2007	—	—N/a	One More Time, OK?
"Miss You" (너무 그리워) (as part of S.M. The Ballad)	2010	16	—N/a	SM the Ballad Vol. 1 – Miss You
"Trap" (Henry featuring Kyuhyun and Taemin)	2013	28	KOR: 322,616	Trap
"Here She Comes" (그녀가 온다) (Lee Moon-se duet with Kyuhyun)	2015	—	—N/a	New Direction
"Two Men" (두 남자) (Parc Jae-jung featuring Kyuhyun)	2016	—	—N/a	Non-album single
"Pat Pat" (쓰담쓰담) (with Mino, P.O)	2019	—	—N/a	Kang's Kitchen 3
"Happy Together" (with Yoo Yeon-seok)	2023	—	—	Bro & Marble
"—" denotes songs that did not chart

=== Promotional singles ===
Title	Year	Peak chart positions	Sales	Album
Title	Year	KOR	Sales	Album
"Happy Bubble" (Note: "Happy Bubble" was used in a promotional campaign for the brand.) (with Donghae featuring Han Ji-min)	2009	—	—N/a	Non-album single
"7 Years of Love" (7년간의 사랑)	2009	—	—N/a	Yoo Young-suk's 20th Anniversary
"Late Autumn" (늦가을)	2011	43	KOR: 268,376	Yoon Jong Shin's The Monthly Melody
"Love Dust"	2013	46	KOR: 69,871	Hwang Sung Je's Project 'Super Hero' OST
"T'ple Couple Want It" (T플커플 Want It!) (Note: "T'ple Couple Want It" was used in a promotional campaign for the telecom brand SK Telecom.) (with Seohyun)	2013	—	—N/a	Non-album single
"I've Loved Just One Person" (한 사람을 사랑했네)	2016	38	KOR: 33,149	Two Yoo Project Sugar Man Part 21
"Samdado News" (삼다도 소식) (Note: "Samdado News" was used in a promotional campaign for the water brand Jeju Samdasoo.)	2016	—	—N/a	Thanks Band
"Like Rain, Like Music" (비처럼 음악처럼)	2020	—	—N/a	The Late Kim Hyun-sik's 30th Anniversary Memorial Album "Making Memories" Part 1
"—" denotes songs that did not chart

== Soundtrack appearances ==
Title	Year	Peak chart positions	Sales	Album
Title	Year	KOR	Sales	Album
"Smile"	2006	—	—N/a	Hyena OST
"Listen… To You" (듣죠… 그대를)	2010	—	—N/a	Pasta OST
"Hope Is a Dream That Doesn't Sleep" (희망은 잠들지 않는 꿈)	2010	40	—N/a	Bread, Love and Dreams OST
"Biting My Lips" (입술을 깨물고) (with Ryeowook and Sungmin)	2010	49	—N/a	The President OST
"The Way to Break Up" (헤어지는 방법)	2011	45	KOR: 120,706	Poseidon OST
"Edge of Rain" (인우 (刃雨))	2012	66	KOR: 132,215	God of War OST
"To the Beautiful You" (아름다운 그대에게)) (with Tiffany)	2012	27	KOR: 140,294	To the Beautiful You OST
"Just Once" (한번만)	2012	68	KOR: 42,499	The Great Seer OST
"Shine Your Way" (Korean version) (with Luna)	2013	—	—N/a	The Croods OST
"Until I Reach Your Star" (너의 별에 닿을 때까지)	2015	29	KOR: 30,823	Hogu's Love OST
"The Time We Loved" (우리가 사랑한 시간)	2015	9	KOR: 210,557	The Time We Were Not in Love OST
"Where Is My Heart" (내 맘은 어디에 두죠)	2016	47	KOR: 41,714	One More Happy Ending OST
"If You"	2017	—	—N/a	Hit the Top OST
"Serendipity" (우연히 그대) (with Gummy)	2019	—	—N/a	Love at First Song OST
"All Day Long" (하루종일)	2020	142	—N/a	When the Weather Is Fine OST
"Confession Is Not Flashy" (화려하지 않은 고백)	2020	8	—N/a	Hospital Playlist OST
"The Moment My Heart Flinched" (내 마음이 움찔했던 순간)	2020	8	—N/a	She Is My Type OST
"Love Beyond Words" (사랑은 말로 표현하는게 아니래요)	2021	122	—N/a	Soundtrack #1 OST
"Promise You"	2022	161	—N/a	Forecasting Love and Weather OST
"Departure from a Country" (출국)	2022	—	—N/a	Sh**ting Stars OST
"Do You Worry" (애태우나요)	2022	—	—N/a	Single's Inferno 2 OST
"What Do You Think" (그대는 날 어떻게 생각해)	2023	—	—N/a	Delivery Man OST
"Still Our Love Continue" (우리 사랑 이대로) (with Jung Eun-ji)	2023	72	—N/a	My Love OST
"—" denotes songs that did not chart

== Other appearances ==
List of non-single guest appearances, showing year released and album name
Title	Year	Peak chart positions	Album
Title	Year	KOR	Album
"하루만 (Just For One Day)" (The Grace ft. Kyuhyun)	2007	—	One More Time, OK?
"Wish"(소원) (TVXQ feat. Kyuhyun and Ryeowook)	2008	—	Mirotic
"Hot Times" (시험하지 말기) (as part of S.M. The Ballad)	2010	93	SM the Ballad Vol. 1 – Miss You
"Love Again" (다시… 사랑합니다) (as part of S.M. The Ballad)	2010	—	SM the Ballad Vol. 1 – Miss You
"Ordinary Day" (with Onew and Taeil)	2021	— (Note: "Ordinary Day" did not enter Gaon Digital Chart, but peaked at position 69 on component Download Chart.)	2021 Winter SM Town: SMCU Express
"You & I" (Eunhyuk feat. Kyuhyun)	2025	— (Note: "You & I" did not enter Circle Digital Chart but peaked at number 76 on Circle Download Chart)	Explorer
"—" denotes songs that did not chart

== Other charted songs ==
Title	Year	Peak chart positions	Sales	Album
Title	Year	KOR	Sales	Album
"At Close" (뒷모습이 참 예뻤구나)	2014	41	KOR: 255,855+	At Gwanghwamun
"Eternal Sunshine"	2014	44	KOR: 108,625+	At Gwanghwamun
"Moment of Farewell" (이별을 말할 때)	2014	49	KOR: 186,108+	At Gwanghwamun
"My Thoughts, Your Memories" (나의 생각, 너의 기억)	2014	56	KOR: 171,146+	At Gwanghwamun
"One Confession" (사랑이 숨긴 말들)	2014	57	KOR: 166,714+	At Gwanghwamun
"Flying, Deep in the Night" (깊은 밤을 날아서)	2014	61	KOR: 99,949+	At Gwanghwamun
"Remember Me" (좋은사람)	2015	41	KOR: 144,756+	Fall, Once Again
"Because I Miss You" (그냥 보고 싶어 그래)	2015	54	KOR: 123,916+	Fall, Once Again
"Autumn Sleeves" (긴 팔)	2015	76	KOR: 77,962+	Fall, Once Again
"Ways to Say Goodbye" (안녕의 방식)	2015	82	KOR: 79,908+	Fall, Once Again
"Piano Forest" (피아노 숲)	2015	83	KOR: 75,863+	Fall, Once Again
"Wind" (바람)	2015	89	KOR: 76,258+	Fall, Once Again
"Last Good-bye" (조용히 안녕)	2016	100	KOR: 98,619+	Waiting, Still
"Love In Time" (시절인연)	2016	—	KOR: 62,704+	Waiting, Still
"And We" (그리고 우리)	2016	—	KOR: 54,180+	Waiting, Still
"Fall In You" (네 안의 가을)	2016	—	KOR: 60,306+	Waiting, Still
"When with Me" (마음세탁소)	2016	—	KOR: 62,895+	Waiting, Still
"—" denotes songs that did not chart

== Songwriting credits ==
All song credits are adapted from the Korea Music Copyright Association's (KOMCA) database unless noted otherwise.

Year	Song	Album	Artist(s)	Lyrics		Music	
Year	Song	Album	Artist(s)	Credit	With	Credit	With
2014	"My Thoughts, Your Memories"	At Gwanghwamun	Kyuhyun	No		Yes	Hwang Sung-jae
2015	"Ways to Say Goodbye"	Fall, Once Again	Kyuhyun	No		Yes	—
2019	"Aewol-ri"	The Day We Meet Again	Kyuhyun	Yes	Hong Seok-min	Yes	Hong Seok-min
2024	"Prologue"	Colors	Kyuhyun	No		Yes	Hong Seok-min, Seo Dong-hwan
2024	"One Spring Day"	Colors	Kyuhyun	Yes	Hong Seok-min	Yes	Hong Seok-min

== Music videos ==
Title	Year
"At Gwanghwamun"	2014
"A Million Pieces"	2015
"The Day We Felt Distance"	2015
"Celebration: Kimi ni Kakeru Hashi"	2016
"Blah Blah"	2016
"Still"	2016
"One Voice"	2017
"Goodbye for Now"	2017
"Time with You"	2019
"Aewol-ri"	2019
"Dreaming"	2020
"Daystar"	2020
"Coffee"	2021
"Love Story"	2022
“The Story Behind"	2024
"Unending Days"	2024

== See also ==
- Super Junior discography
- SM the Ballad#Discography
- Super Junior-K.R.Y.#Discography
