= Super Junior-K.R.Y. Asia Tour 2015: Phonograph =

2015–16 concert tour by Super Junior-K.R.Y.

Super Junior-K.R.Y. Asia Tour: Phonograph
- Asia tour by Super Junior-K.R.Y.
- Promotional poster for Super Junior-K.R.Y. Asia Tour: Phonograph in Jakarta
- Associated album: Join Hands
- Start date: 22 August 2015
- End date: 3 January 2016
- Legs: 6
- No. of shows: 2 in South Korea; 1 in Thailand; 2 in Taiwan; 1 in China; 1 in Hong Kong; 1 in Indonesia; 9 in total
- Website: superjunior.smtown.com

Super Junior-K.R.Y. concert chronology
- Super Junior-K.R.Y. Japan Tour 2015: Phonograph (2015); Super Junior-K.R.Y. Asia Tour: Phonograph (2015); Super Junior-K.R.Y. – The Moment With Us (2020)

Super Junior-K.R.Y. Asia Tour 2015: Phonograph is the second solo concert held by Super Junior-K.R.Y. to promote their single Join Hands. The Asia tour commenced with two shows in Seoul from 22–23 August, continued in Taipei, Bangkok, Shanghai, Hongkong and ended in Tangerang.

== Summary ==
Super Junior-K.R.Y. during Super Show 6 Encore Concert in Seoul announced their Asia tour July 11–12. Official announcement released by SM Entertainment on 17 July 2015. Ticket went on sale after five days on July 22, 2015.

On November 15, 2015 the Indonesian promoter revealed Phonograph's Jakarta concert date. The Indonesian show guest is Leeteuk. Ryeowook sung local songs from Indonesian band Noah - Separuh Aku and Bebi Romeo - Bunga terakhir.

== Tour dates ==
Dates	City	Country	Venue
August 22, 2015	Seoul	South Korea	Olympic Hall
August 23, 2015	Seoul	South Korea	Olympic Hall
December 5, 2015	Taipei	Taiwan	Xinzhuang Gymnasium
December 6, 2015	Taipei	Taiwan	Xinzhuang Gymnasium
December 12, 2015	Bangkok	Thailand	Thunder Dome
December 13, 2015	Bangkok	Thailand	Thunder Dome
December 19, 2015	Shanghai	China	Shanghai Gymnasium
December 26, 2015	Hong Kong		AsiaWorld–Arena
January 3, 2016	Tangerang	Indonesia	ICE - BSD City

== Setlist ==
Seoul (Opening weekend)

- Opening VCR -

- Opening Medley
1. Hana Mizuki (KR) (Kyuhyun)
2. Coagulation (Ryeowook)
3. Let's Not... (Yesung)

- VCR #2 -

- My Love, My Kiss, My Heart
- 중 (...ing)

- Ment -

- Believe
- In My Dream
- Lunar Eclipse

- VCR #3 -

- Gray Paper ^{(22/08)} / Blind ^{(23/08)} (Yesung Solo)

- Ment (Yesung) -

- Confession ^{22/08} / It Has to be You^{(23/08)} (Yesung Solo)
- The Time We Weren't in Love (Kyuhyun Solo)

- Ment (Kyuhyun) -

- Wildflowers (Kyuhyun Solo)
- Maybe Tomorrow (Ryeowook Solo)

- Ment (Ryeowook) -

- 잠시만 안녕 (Ryeowook Solo)

- Ment + Band Introduction ^{(23 Aug)} -

- Remake Medley
1. Someday
2. Our Love
3. Good Person

- Ment ^{(22 Aug)} + Band Introduction ^{(22 Aug)} -

- Loving You ^{(22 Aug)}

- VCR #4-

- Love Disease
- Dorothy

- Ment -

- At Gwanghwamun
- Sky

- Encore VCR -

- From U

- Yesung's 32nd birthday celebration party (with Eunhyuk, Siwon) ^{(23 Aug)}-

- We Can

- Ment -

- The One I Love

- Ending -

- Ending VCR -
Bangkok

- Opening VCR -

- Opening Medley
1. Hana Mizuki (KR) (Kyuhyun)
2. Coagulation (Ryeowook)
3. Let's Not... (Yesung)

- VCR #2 -

- My Love, My Kiss, My Heart
- 중 (...ing)

- Ment -

- Believe
- In My Dream
- Lunar Eclipse

- VCR #3 -

- Gray Paper (Yesung Solo)

- Ment ([[(22 Aug) ]]) -

- Blind ([[(22 Aug) ]] Solo)
- A Million Pieces (Kyuhyun Solo)

- Ment (Kyuhyun) -

- ทุกอย่าง (Kyuhyun Solo)
- ทิ้งไว้กลางทาง (Ryeowook Solo)

- Ment (Ryeowook) -

- มันคงเป็นความรัก (Ryeowook Solo)

- Ment + Band Introduction -

- Remake Medley
1. Someday
2. Our Love
3. Good Person

- VCR #4 -

- Love Disease
- Dorothy

- Ment -

- At Gwanghwamun
- Sky

- Encore VCR -

- From U

- Ment -

- We Can

- Ment -

- The One I Love

- Ending -

- Ending VCR -
Shanghai

- Opening VCR -

- Opening Medley
1. Hana Mizuki (KR) (Kyuhyun)
2. Coagulation (Ryeowook)
3. Let's Not... (Yesung)

- VCR #2 -

- My Love, My Kiss, My Heart
- 중 (...ing)

- Ment -

- Believe
- In My Dream
- Lunar Eclipse

- VCR #3 -

- Gray Paper (Yesung Solo)

- Ment (Yesung) -

- It Has To be You (Yesung Solo)
- JJ Lin - She Says (Kyuhyun Solo)

- Ment (Kyuhyun) -

- A Million Pieces (Kyuhyun Solo)
- Maybe Tomorrow (Ryeowook Solo)

- Ment (Ryeowook) -

- Jam Hsiao - Forgive Me (Ryeowook Solo)

- Ment -

- Remake Medley
1. Someday
2. Our Love
3. Good Person)

- Ment + Band Introduction -

- Loving You

- VCR #4 -

- Love Disease
- Dorothy

- Ment -

- At Gwanghwamun
- Sky

- Encore VCR -

- From U

- Ment -

- We Can

- Ment -

- The One I Love

- Ending -

- Ending VCR -
Tangerang

- Opening VCR -

- Opening Medley
1. Hana Mizuki (KR) (Kyuhyun)
2. Coagulation (Ryeowook)
3. Let's Not... (Yesung)

- VCR #2 -

- My Love, My Kiss, My Heart
- 중 (...ing)

- Ment -

- Believe
- In My Dream
- Lunar Eclipse

- VCR #3 -

- Gray Paper (Yesung Solo)

- Ment (Yesung) -

- It Has To be You (Yesung Solo)
- Wildflower (Kyuhyun Solo)

- Ment (Kyuhyun) -

- A Million Pieces (Kyuhyun Solo)
- Separuh Aku (Ryeowook Solo)

- Ment (Ryeowook) -

- Bunga Terakhir (Ryeowook Solo)
- Hello (Leeteuk Special Stage

- Ment -

- Remake Medley
1. Someday
2. Our Love
3. Good Person

- Ment + Band Introduction -

- Loving You

- VCR #4 -

- Love Disease
- Dorothy

- Ment -

- At Gwanghwamun
- Sky

- Encore VCR -

- From U

- Ment -

- We Can

- Ment -

- The One I Love

- Ending -

- Ending VCR -

== Guest ==
Dates	Guest
August 23, 2015	Eunhyuk, Siwon
January 3, 2016	Leeteuk

== Discography ==
Format	DVD Album
DVD	Super Junior-K.R.Y. Asia Tour: Phonograph in Seoul DVD: Release: 23 September 2016

== Personnel ==
- Super Junior-K.R.Y. (Yesung, Ryeowook, Kyuhyun)
- Tour organizer: SM Entertainment
- Tour promoter: Dream Makers
