= Celebration (Kimi ni Kakeru Hashi) =

"Celebration～君に架ける橋～"
- CD Only cover

Single by Kyuhyun
- Language: Japanese
- A-side: "Celebration ～Kimini Kakeru Hashi～'
- B-side: "Lost My Way"; "Beautiful"
- Released: May 25, 2016
- Recorded: 2016
- Genre: J-pop
- Label: Avex Trax
- Composers: Erika Tsuchiya; Hajime Watanabe
- Lyricist: SHIKATA
- Producers: Nam So-young; Ryuhei Chiba; Sky Beatz

Kyuhyun singles chronology
"The Day We Felt Distance" (2015)	"Celebration～君に架ける橋～" (2016)	"Still" (2016)

Kyuhyun Japanese singles chronology
"Celebration ～Kimini Kakeru Hashi～" (2016)	"My Serious Love Comedy" (2017)

Celebration ～Kimini Kakeru Hashi～ is a debut Japanese single recorded by Super Junior's Kyuhyun. The single was released on May 25, 2016 by Avex Trax.

== Background and release ==
On April 21, it was announced that Kyuhyun will be released debut single in Japan named "Celebration ～Kimini Kakeru Hashi～", which was scheduled to be released in Japan on May 25, 2016. On May 11, further information regarding the single would be distributed under three formats: CD+Smapler, CD+DVD+Smapler and CD+DVD E.L.F Japan Edition. The accompanying music video for the single features Rina Kawaei, an actress and former member of AKB48, who acted as Kyuhyun's love interest. The single debuted at number 1 on the Japanese Oricon Singles Chart, selling 27,690 physical copies in its first day of release.

== Track listing ==
CD+Smapler/Digital download
No.	Title	Lyrics	Music	Length
1.	"Celebration ～Kimini Kakeru Hashi～" (Celebration～君に架ける橋～)	SHIKATA	Sky Beatz; SHIKATA; Mats Lie Skare	4:02
2.	"Lost My Way"	Erika Tsuchiya	Yu Song-yeon; Jay Lee; Cray Bin	3:55
3.	"Beautiful"	Hajime Watanabe	Lee San-jun; Cha Gil-wan	3:53
4.	"Celebration～君に架ける橋～" (Instrumental)		Sky Beatz; SHIKATA; Mats Lie Skare	4:02
5.	"Lost My Way" (Instrumental)		Yu Song-yeon; Jay Lee; Cray Bin	3:55
6.	"Beautiful" (Instrumental)		Lee San-jun; Cha Gil-wan	3:53

CD+DVD+Smapler
No.	Title	Length
1.	"Celebration ~Kimi ni Kakeru Hashi~" (Music video)
2.	"Celebration ~Kimi ni Kakeru Hashi~" (Music video and Jacket making)

CD+DVD - E.L.F-JAPAN Edition
No.	Title	Length
1.	"Celebration ~Kimi ni Kakeru Hashi~" (Recording making)

== Charts and sales ==
=== Chart ===
Chart (2016)	Peak position
Japan (Japan Hot 100)	26
Japan Singles Chart (Oricon)	5
Japan Top Single Sales (Billboard Japan)	12

=== Sales ===
Country	Sales
Japan (Oricon)	31,302

== Release history ==
Region	Release date	Format	Label	Ref
Japan	May 25, 2016	CD; DVD; Sumapura	Avex Trax	
Various	May 25, 2016	Digital download; streaming	Avex Trax	
