= Restart (EP) =

- Digital cover

EP by Kyuhyun
- Released: January 9, 2024
- Recorded: 2023–2024
- Studio: Antenna (Seoul)
- Genre: Pop rock
- Length: 23:52
- Language: Korean
- Labels: Antenna; Kakao

Kyuhyun chronology
Love Story (2022)	Restart (2024)	Colors (2024)

Singles from Restart
- 1. "The Story Behind" Released: January 9, 2024

Music video
- "The Story Behind" on YouTube

Restart is the fifth extended play by South Korean singer Cho Kyu-hyun. It was released on January 9, 2024, by Antenna, his first release with a new agency after departing from SM Entertainment after spending 17 years with them. The EP consists of six tracks in total, including the lead single, "The Story Behind".

== Background ==
On July 14, 2023, Kyuhyun and Super Junior bandmates Donghae and Eunhyuk announced that they had not decided to renew their contract with SM Entertainment, but will continue Super Junior group activity with SM. On August 7, Kyuhyun announced that he will join You Hee-yeol's Antenna as his new label.

On December 14, Antenna announced that Kyuhyun will release his first material with the agency with an EP titled Restart on January 9, 2024. The agency stated, "The new album is going to be a new starting point and marking Kyuhyun's musical growth." A week later, Antenna tweeted the track list of the EP, which includes title track "The Story Behind", and a song that featured Kyuhyun's Super Junior sub-group, Super Junior-K.R.Y.

On January 9, the EP was released alongside the music video for its title track.

== Composition ==
Although there are ballad tracks, the tracks featured on Restart are a departure from Kyuhyun's signature ballad sound. During the album's showcase in Seoul, Kyuhyun stated, "Fans are going to be surprised when they listen to the album since it has rock elements blended in with pop-style songs, which I haven't done before." He also stated that he listened to the label's executives to avoid sounding too similar to his previous works.

The opening track, "Restart" is a rock song that features the singer's exquisite and solid voice with hopeful lyrics, symbolizing the aura of a new beginning. "The Story Behind", the lead single of the EP falls under modern rock genre and was written by the label's founder, You Hee-yeol, and Humbler. The lyrics depict the excitement of seeing a loved one that has not been seen for a long time. The third track, "Slow, Slowly" is a ballad song that lyrically pertains to accepting a breakup slowly. "Was it Love" is a ballad track with minimalist arrangements of only vocals, piano, and strings, the lyrics themselves are about a calm confession. Kyuhyun recounted the song was the song he favored, and it momentarily caused some friction with CEO You. The fifth track, "Rainbow" is another ballad song, with a piano as its background melody. The last track of the album, "Thanks to You" is categorized as a R&B song. It is a special song recorded by Super Junior-K.R.Y. as a thank you and gift to the fans who had waited for the sub-group's team up for a long time.

== Promotion ==
The music video for its lead single was released on the same day as the album's release, where it featured Kyuhyun and actress Won Ji-an. On January 26, he uploaded a video showing the process of filming the music video on his YouTube channel.

=== Live performances ===
Kyuhyun began promoting the EP by performing "The Story Behind" live on Music Bank on January 12, January 13 on MBC's Show! Music Core, and January 14 on Inkigayo.

=== Concert tour ===
Shortly after the live promotions on music shows, on January 17, Antenna announced that Kyuhyun will embark on his first solo Asia tour called 2024 Kyuhyun Asia Tour Restart from March 8 until May 18.

== Sales ==
The EP reached a cumulative of 50,832 sales according to Circle Chart in South Korea on February. In Japan, in its physical release, the album was sold in 3,347 copies.

== Track listing ==
Restart track listing
No.	Title	Lyrics	Music	Arrangement	Length
1.	"Restart"	WDLM; Honey jar	Brian Cho; WDLM; Saimon	Saimon; Brian Cho	3:52
2.	"The Story Behind" (그렇지 않아; Geureochi ana; 'It is not so')	Humbler; You Hee-yeol	Humbler	Humbler	4:16
3.	"Slow, Slowly" (천천히, 느리게; Cheoncheonhi, neurige)	Hwang Hyun (MonoTree)	Humbler	Humbler	3:50
4.	"Was It Love" (사랑이었을까; Sarangieosseulkka)	Lisun; You Hee-yeol; Ecobridge	Lisun; Kim Ji-hoon	Kim Ji-hoon; Lisun; Kwon Young-chan	4:07
5.	"Rainbow"	Hwang Yoo-bin	Seo Dong-hwan	Seo Dong-hwan	4:25
6.	"Thanks to You" (너여서 그래; Neoyeoseo geurae; 'It's because of you'; performed by Super Junior-K.R.Y.)	minGtion; Junny	minGtion; Junny	minGtion	3:19
Total length:					23:52

== Charts ==
=== Album ===
Chart performance for Restart
Chart (2024)	Peak position
South Korean Albums (Circle)	8
Japan (Oricon)	18

=== Songs ===
Song chart performance
Title	Chart (2024)	Peak position
"The Story Behind"	Digital Chart (Circle)	108

== Release history ==
Release history for Restart
Region	Date	Format	Label
South Korea	January 9, 2024	CD	Antenna; Kakao
Various	January 9, 2024	Digital download; streaming	Antenna

== See also ==
- Cho Kyu-hyun discography
