= Super Junior-K.R.Y. The 1st Concert =

2010–11 concert tour by Super Junior-K.R.Y.

- Asia tour by Super Junior-K.R.Y.
- Promotional poster for Super Junior-K.R.Y. The 1st Concert
- Start date: 1 August 2010
- End date: 4 October 2011
- Legs: 4
- No. of shows: 12
- Website: superjunior.smtown.com

Super Junior-K.R.Y. concert chronology
- Super Junior-K.R.Y. The 1st Concert (2010–11); Super Junior-K.R.Y. Special Winter Concert (2010–13)

Super Junior-K.R.Y. The 1st Concert is the first concert tour and sixth international tour by South Korean boy band Super Junior sub group, Super Junior-K.R.Y. The Asia tour commenced with two shows in Tokyo from 1 to 2 August 2010 and hit a total of 12 concerts This concert gathering over 22,000 fans. Super Junior members Donghae, Sungmin, and Heechul along with label-mate Shinee and TRAX appeared as guests in the Seoul Concert.

== Setlist ==
Tokyo (Opening Weekend)

- Opening VCR -

- Dreaming Hero
- 걸음을 멈추고
- Let's Not...

- Ment -

- Heartquake (Feat. Donghae)
- What If

- VCR #2 -

- 듣죠... 그대를 (Kyuhyun Solo)
- Infection / 瞳を閉じて (눈을 감고)(Kyuhyun Solo)

- VCR #3 -

- One Fine Spring Day (Ryeowook Solo)
- 三日月(Ryeowook Solo)

- VCR #4 -

- It Has to Be You (Yesung Solo)
- 運命の人 (운명의 인간)(Yesung Solo)
- クルミ (호두나무)(Sungmn, Donghae)

- VCR #5 -

- H.I.T.
- Mirror
- In My Dream

- Ment -
- VCR #6 -

- Coagulation
- Just You
- The Night Chicago Died

- Ment -

- The One I Love
- Ending -
Seoul

- Opening VCR -

- Sorry, Sorry - Answer
- Dreaming Hero
- Just You

- Ment -

- Let's Not...
- Heartquake (Feat. Donghae)
- What If

- VCR #2 -

- That Man (O.S.T Secret Garden)(Kyuhyun Solo)
- 눈의 꽃(O.S.T Sorry, I Love You)(Kyuhyun Solo)

- VCR #3 -

- Smile Again (Ryeowook Solo)

- VCR #4 -

- 널 기다리며 (Yesung Solo)
- It Has to Be You (Yesung Solo)
- Blame It on the Girls (Ryeowook Solo)

- VCR #5 -

- The Night Chicago Died

- VCR #6 -

- Coagulation

- Ment -

- 西風的話 (서풍적화)
- 걸음을 멈추고

- VCR #7 -

- H.I.T.
- Mirror
- In My Dream

- Ment -

- The One I Love

- Encore -

- Super Junior Medley
1. U
2. Bonamana
3. Sorry, Sorry

- Ment -

- Angel
- Ending -
Nanjing

- Opening VCR -

- Sorry, Sorry - Answer
- Dreaming Hero
- Just You

- Ment -

- Let's Not...
- Heartquake (Feat. Donghae)
- What If

- VCR #2 -

- 희망은 잠들지 않는 꿈 (Kyuhyun Solo)

- Ment -

- 如果你也聽說 (If You Have Heard) (Kyuhyun Solo)

- VCR #3 -

- One Fine Spring Day^{CH}(Ryeowook Solo)

- VCR #4 -

- It Has to Be You (Yesung Solo)

- Ment -

- 단 하루만 (Yesung Solo)
- Blame It on the Girls (Ryeowook Solo)

- VCR #5 -

- The Night Chicago Died

- VCR #6 -

- Coagulation

- Ment -

- 西風的話 (서풍적화)
- 걸음을 멈추고

- VCR #6 -

- H.I.T.
- Mirror
- In My Dream

- Ment -

- The One I Love

- Encore -

- Super Junior Medley
1. Mr. Simple
2. Bonamana
3. Sorry, Sorry

- Ment -

- Angel
- Ending -

== Tour dates ==
Date	City	Country	Venue	Attendance
August 1, 2010	Tokyo	Japan	Tokyo International Forum Hall A	10,000
August 2, 2010	Tokyo	Japan	Tokyo International Forum Hall A	10,000
November 1, 2010	Kobe	Japan	Kobe World Memorial Hall	16,000
November 2, 2010	Kobe	Japan	Kobe World Memorial Hall	16,000
20 November 2010	Taipei	Taiwan	Taiwan National University Sports Centre	8,600
November 21, 2010	Taipei	Taiwan	Taiwan National University Sports Centre	8,600
December 1, 2010	Fukuoka	Japan	Fukuoka Sun Palace Hotel	4,632
December 2, 2010	Fukuoka	Japan	Fukuoka Sun Palace Hotel	4,632
February 11, 2011	Seoul	South Korea	Woori Finance Art Hall	5'000
February 12, 2011	Seoul	South Korea	Woori Finance Art Hall	5'000
February 13, 2011	Seoul	South Korea	Woori Finance Art Hall	5'000
October 4, 2011	Nanjing	China	Nanjing Olympic Sport Centre	13,000
Total				57,200

== Personnel ==
- Artists: Super Junior-K.R.Y.: Yesung, Ryeowook and Kyuhyun
- Tour organizer: SM Entertainment
- Tour promoter: Dream Maker Entercom
