= Super Junior-K.R.Y. Japan Tour 2015: Phonograph =

2015 concert tour by Super Junior-K.R.Y.

- Japan tour by Super Junior-K.R.Y.
- Album cover regular edition
- Start date: 2 June 2015
- End date: 2 July 2015
- Legs: 1
- No. of shows: 11
- Website: superjunior.smtown.com

Super Junior-K.R.Y. concert chronology
- Super Junior-K.R.Y. Special Winter Concert (2012-13); Super Junior-K.R.Y. Japan Tour 2015: Phonograph (2015); Super Junior-K.R.Y. Asia Tour 2015: Phonograph (2015)

Super Junior-K.R.Y. Japan Tour 2015: Phonograph is the first Japan arena tour of South Korean boyband Super Junior's first sub-unit, Super Junior-K.R.Y. The group held 11 concerts across Yokohama, Kobe, Fukuoka, and Nagoya and was attended by 90,000 fans. They performed over 24 songs including some of Super Junior's songs, original soundtracks, and songs from Japanese singers. The tour was in support of their 2nd Japanese single "Join Hands".

This tour marks the return of Yesung, who was discharged from mandatory military service in May 2015.

== Summary ==
On February 24, 2015, it was announced that Super Junior-KRY was to kick off their 2nd Japan tour, with Yesung rejoining Super Junior K.R.Y. after his military discharge. Ticket sales opened on April 17, 2015 in Yahoo Japan. Because of overwhelming response from fans, the tour concert then added two days more. The additional dates would be scheduled on 13 and 14 June and 2 July 2015, for which tickets went on sale on April 21, 2015.

For the first time Kyuhyun, Ryeowook and Yesung performed their newest single Join Hands in front of 26 thousand fans in Yokohama Arena.

== Setlist ==
Setlist

- Opening VCR -

- Opening Medley
1. Hanamizuki (Kyuhyun)
2. Coagulation (Ryeowook)
3. Let's Not...) (Yesung)

- VCR #2 -

- My Love, My Kiss, My Heart
- 중 (...ing)

- Ment -

- Believe
- 걸음을 멈추고
- Lunar Eclipse

- VCR #3 -

- Gray Paper (Yesung Solo)
- Confession (Yesung Solo)

- Ment (Yesung) -

- Aitakute Ima (Ryeowook Solo)
- Sakura (Kyuhyun Solo)

- Ment (Kyuhyun) -

- At Gwanghwamun (Kyuhyun Solo)
- つけまつける - 속눈썹 붙이자 (Ryeowook Solo)

- Ment -

- ひまわりの約束 - 해바라기의 약속 (Standby Me O.S.T.)
- 366日
- Loving You

- VCR #4 -

- Points of No Return
- Dorothy

- Ment -

- Promise You
- Sky

- Encore VCR -

- From U
- Join Hands

- Ment -

- The One I Love
- Ending -

== Tour dates ==
Dates	City	Venue	Attendance
June 2, 2015	Yokohama	Yokohama Arena	26,000
June 3, 2015	Yokohama	Yokohama Arena	26,000
June 11, 2015	Kobe	Kobe World Memorial Hall	24,000
June 12, 2015	Kobe	Kobe World Memorial Hall	24,000
June 13, 2015	Kobe	Kobe World Memorial Hall	24,000
June 14, 2015	Kobe	Kobe World Memorial Hall	24,000
June 17, 2015	Fukuoka	Marine Messe Fukuoka	20,000
June 18, 2015	Fukuoka	Marine Messe Fukuoka	20,000
June 30, 2015	Nagoya	Nippon Galshi Hall Nagoya	20,000
July 1, 2015	Nagoya	Nippon Galshi Hall Nagoya	20,000
July 2, 2015	Nagoya	Nippon Galshi Hall Nagoya	20,000
Total			90,000

== Discography ==
Format	DVD & Blu-ray Album
DVD & Blu-ray	Super Junior-K.R.Y. Japan Tour 2015: Phonograph: Rilis: December 2, 2015; Version: Regular Edition; Limited Edition; Blu-ray Limited Release

== Personnel ==
- Artists:Super Junior-K.R.Y (Yesung, Ryeowook, Kyuhyun)
- Tour organizer: SM Entertainment
- Tour promoter: Dream Makers
