= Super Junior-K.R.Y. Special Winter Concert =

2012–13 concert tour by Super Junior-K.R.Y.

- Japan tour by Super Junior-K.R.Y.
- Promotional poster for Super Junior-K.R.Y. Special Winter Concert
- Associated album: Promise You
- Start date: 19 November 2012
- End date: 24 January 2013
- Legs: 3
- No. of shows: 9
- Website: superjunior.smtown.com

Super Junior-K.R.Y. concert chronology
- Super Junior-K.R.Y. The 1st Concert (2010-11); Super Junior-K.R.Y. Special Winter Concert (2012-13); Super Junior-K.R.Y. Japan Tour 2015: Phonograph (2015)

Super Junior-K.R.Y. Special Winter Concert is Japan tour concert held by sub-group South Korean boy band Super Junior, Super Junior-K.R.Y. to promote their Japanese single "Promise You". The Japan tour commenced with three shows in Yokohama and end in Tokyo gathering over 72,000 fans.

== Setlist ==
Yokohama

- Opening VCR -

- Sorry Sorry Answer
- H.I.T
- From U
- Believe
- Hanamizuki
- Coagulation
- Just You

- VCR #2 -

- Silent Night
- Feliz Navidad
- Last Christmas
- クリスマス・イブ
- My Love, My Kiss, My Heart

- VCR #3 -

- The Night Chicago Died
- Mirror
- La La La Love Song（久保田利伸）
- 인우 (刃雨) (Kyuhyun Solo)
- この世界のどこかで(Kono sekai no dokokade) (Kyuhyun Solo)
- .残像(Hikari) (Kyuhyun Solo)
- Baby (Ryeowook Solo)
- ありがとう〜帰りたくなったよ(メドレー) (Ryeowook Solo)
- It Has to Be You (Yesung Solo)
- First Love (Yesung Solo)
- I Do (Yesung Solo)

- Ment -

- Your Eyes (RW Piano)
- Midnight Fantasy
- Loving You
- The One I Love

- Encore -

- Bittersweet
- Promise You
- Sky
- Promise You
- Sky
- Ending -
Tokyo
- Sorry Sorry Answer
- H.I.T
- From U
- Believe

- VCR #2 - - Ment -

- ハナミズキ (산딸기나무)
- Coagulation
- Just You

- VCR #2 -

- The Night Chicago Died
- Mirror
- La La La Love Song

- VCR #3 -

- この世界のどこかで (이 세상 어딘가에서) O.S.T (Kyuhyun Solo)
- 残像 (잔상) (Kyuhyun Solo)
- Baby (Ryeowook Solo)
- 三日月 (Ryeowook Solo)
- It Has to Be You (Yesung Solo)
- I Do (Yesung Solo)

- Ment -

- Your Eyes
- Midnight Fantasy
- Loving You
- The One I Love

- Encore -

- Bittersweet
- Promise You
- SKY
- Ending -

== Tour dates ==
Dates	City	Venue	Attendance
November 19, 2012	Yokohama	Pacifico Yokohama Convention Center	15,000
November 20, 2012	Yokohama	Pacifico Yokohama Convention Center	15,000
November 21, 2012	Yokohama	Pacifico Yokohama Convention Center	15,000
December 22, 2012	Kobe	Kobe world Memorial Hall	21,000
December 23, 2012	Kobe	Kobe world Memorial Hall	21,000
December 24, 2012	Kobe	Kobe world Memorial Hall	21,000
January 22, 2013	Tokyo	Budokan	36,000
January 23, 2013	Tokyo	Budokan	36,000
Januari 24 2013	Tokyo	Budokan	36,000
Total			72,000

== Personnel ==
- Artists: Super Junior-K.R.Y.: Yesung, Ryeowook and Kyuhyun
- Tour organizer: SM Entertainment
- Tour promoter: Dream Maker Entercom
