= Love Story (Kyuhyun EP) =

Love Story (4 Season Project 季)
- Digital cover

EP by Kyuhyun
- Released: January 25, 2022
- Recorded: 2020–2022
- Studios: In Grid (Seoul); SM Big Shot (Seoul); SM Blue Ocean (Seoul); SM LVYIN (Seoul); SM Yellow Tail (Seoul); T (Seoul)
- Genre: K-pop
- Length: 24:31
- Language: Korean
- Labels: SM; Label SJ; Dreamus
- Producer: Lee Soo-man

Kyuhyun chronology
One Voice (2017)	Love Story (4 Season Project 季) (2022)	Restart (2024)

Singles from Love Story (4 Season Project 季)
- 1. "Dreaming" Released: July 23, 2020; 2. "Daystar" Released: October 8, 2020; 3. "Moving On" Released: January 26, 2021; 4. "Coffee" Released: April 13, 2021; 5. "Together" Released: July 5, 2021; 6. "Love Story" Released: January 25, 2022

Music videos
- "연애소설 (Love Story)" on YouTube
- "커피 (Coffee)" on YouTube
- "투게더 (Together)" on YouTube
- "내 마음을 누르는 일 (Daystar)" on YouTube
- "Dreaming Special Clip" on YouTube
- "마지막 날에 (Moving On)" on YouTube

Love Story (4 Season Project 季) is the fourth extended play by South Korean singer and Super Junior member, Kyuhyun. The EP was released on January 25, 2022, by Label SJ, SM Entertainment and distributed by Dreamus Company, in Korea. It contains six tracks in total, which were released as a four-season project from 2020 to 2022. The release of the EP marked the finale of Project: 季.

== Background ==
Kyuhyun announced the release of Love Story (4 Season Project 季) at midnight on January 10, 2022, on Super Junior's Twitter account. He stated in the video uploaded via Twitter Media Studio that the track "Love Story" would conclude the series and aims to stimulate the emotions within a relationship during winter.

For this project, Kyuhyun wanted the listener to experience the different moods of love and genres representing each season.

Each of the music videos for "Love Story", "Coffee", "Together" and "Moving On" gives the audience a snippet of the love story between two schoolmates who stuck together until they became adults. The music videos starred actor Gong Myung and actress Chae Soo-bin.

Separately, the music video for "Daystar" starred Hospital Playlist actor Yoo Yeon-seok. Kyuhyun has known the actor through variety shows, working together in the musical Werther, and also sang the OST "Confession is Not Flashy" for the drama Hospital Playlist.

== Special performances ==
A remastered version of the song "Love Story" featuring artist Soyou, was released and performed on Hidden Singer Season 7, where Kyuhyun had appeared as a guest star, on August 17, 2022. The track is also now available on streaming platforms.

== Composition ==
The EP opens with "Love Story". It is a ballad song about yearning for a lover though the relationship is already part of the past. The lyrics speak about reminiscing the memories of a past relationship, as if flipping through a novel. Each track has an epilogue, in which all six tracks string together a storyline, in line with the title of the EP Love Story.

== Packaging ==
The Love Story (4 Season Project 季) physical album consists of two versions: "Letter" and "Story". The albums are structured like a novel with chapters, including pictures of Kyuhyun from photoshoots of the different music video locations, and each version comes with a bookmark.

== Track listing ==
Love Story track listing
No.	Title	Lyrics	Music	Arrangement	Length
1.	"Love Story" (Korean: 연애소설; RR: Yeonae Soseol; lit. 'Love Novel')	Kenzie	Kenzie	Kenzie	4:23
2.	"Coffee" (Korean: 커피; RR: Keopi)	Kenzie	Kenzie	Kenzie	3:42
3.	"Together" (Korean: 투게더; RR: Tugedeo)	Kenzie	Kenzie	Kenzie	3:26
4.	"Daystar" (Korean: 내 마음을 누르는 일; RR: Nae Maeumeul Nureuneun Il; lit. 'The Thing That Suppresses My Heart')	Seo Ji-eum; 1601	1601	1601	3:58
5.	"Dreaming"	Hong Seok-min	Hong Seok-min	Hong Seok-min	4:05
6.	"Moving On" (Korean: 마지막 날에; RR: Majimak Nare; lit. 'On the Last Day')	Hong Seok-min	Hong Seok-min	Jeon Da-eun	4:57
Total length:					24:31

== Charts ==
=== Weekly charts ===
Weekly chart performance for Love Story
Chart (2022)	Peak position
Japanese Albums (Oricon)	20
Japanese Combined Albums (Oricon)	48
Japanese Hot Albums (Billboard Japan)	31
South Korean Albums (Gaon)	4

=== Monthly charts ===
Monthly chart performance for Love Story
Chart (2022)	Peak position
South Korean Albums (Circle)	20

== Release history ==
Release history for Love Story
Region	Date	Format	Label
South Korea	January 25, 2022	CD	SM; Label SJ; Dreamus
Various	January 25, 2022	Digital download; streaming	SM; Label SJ
