= Brown Eyed Soul (band) =

South Korean R&B group

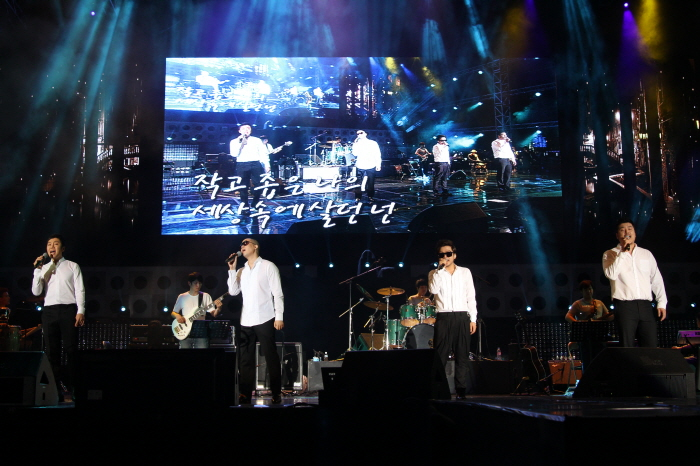

Background information
- Origin: South Korea
- Genres: K-pop, R&B
- Years active: 2003–present
- Members: Jungyup; Naul; Youngjun; Sung Hoon
- Website: Santa Music

Brown Eyed Soul (Korean: 브라운 아이드 소울) is a South Korean R&B music group.

== History ==
Brown Eyed Soul released their debut album, Soul Free, on September 17, 2003. From it the single Jeongmal Saranghaesseulkka (정말 사랑했을까) stayed in the top music charts for a while and won 1st place in KBS charts. In 2004, they had their first individual concert.

After their debut, they took 4 years to record their 2nd album The Wind, The Sea, The Rain, which was released on November 2, 2007. Their 2nd album sold about 100,000 copies. It helped them win the R&B award at the 5th Korean Music awards in 2008.

In 2010, they made their comeback to the music industry by releasing the 3 singles I’ll Make Way, Blowin My Mind on April 7, Love Ballad, Never Forget on May 10, & Can’t Stop Lovin’ You on July 6. In the music video of the song I’ll Make Way (a.k.a. I’ll Move), besides the actress Lee Da-hae, all the Brown Eyed Soul members made their appearance together for the first time. This MV also came in 2 versions: 1 Black & White, & the other a Colour version.

== Members ==
- Ahn Jung-yeop (안정엽)
- Yoo Na-ul (유나얼)
- Go Young-jun (고영준)
- Sung Hoon (성훈)

== Discography ==
=== Studio albums ===
Title	Album details	Peak chart positions	Sales
Title	Album details	KOR	Sales
Soul Free	Released: September 17, 2003; Label: CJ E&M; Formats: CD, digital download	11	KOR: 364,580
The Wind, The Sea, The Rain	Released: November 2, 2007; Label: CJ E&M; Formats: CD, digital download	15	KOR: 104,318
Browneyed Soul	Released: November 25, 2010; Label: In Next Trend, CJ E&M; Formats: CD, digital download	2	KOR: 11,692
Soul Cooke	Released: December 8, 2015; Label: In Next Trend, Santa Music, CJ E&M; Formats: CD, digital download	6	KOR: 13,770
It' Soul Right	Released: September 30, 2019; Label: In Next Trend; Formats: CD, digital download	7	KOR: 6,710
Soul Tricycle	Released: September 23, 2025; Label: Long Play Music; Formats: CD, digital download	25	KOR: 6,550

=== Live albums ===
Title	Album details	Peak chart positions	Sales
Title	Album details	KOR	Sales
Brown Eyed Soul Christmas Concert Live 2007	Released: December 4, 2008; Label: In Next Trend, Danal Entertainment; Formats: CD, digital download	—	—N/a
Soul Fever	Released: December 15, 2011; Label: In Next Trend, CJ E&M; Formats: CD, digital download	4	KOR: 5,048

=== Extended plays ===
Title	Album details	Peak chart positions	Sales
Title	Album details	KOR	Sales
Thank Your Soul	Released: December 19, 2013; Label: In Next Trend, CJ E&M; Formats: CD, digital download	—	—N/a
Thank Your Soul - Side A	Released: February 14, 2014; Label: In Next Trend, CJ E&M; Formats: CD, digital download	3	KOR: 17,693
Brown Eyed Soul Single Project	Released: May 7, 2015; Label: In Next Trend, CJ E&M; Formats: CD, digital download	—	—N/a
Right (feat. Sole)	Released: September 2, 2019; Label: In Next Trend; Formats: CD, digital download	—	—N/a

=== Single albums ===
Title	Album details	Peak chart positions	Sales
Title	Album details	KOR	Sales
I'll Move / Blowin My Mind	Released: March 25, 2010; Label: In Next Trend, CJ E&M; Formats: CD, digital download	2	—N/a
Love Ballad / Never Forget	Released: May 11, 2010; Label: In Next Trend, CJ E&M; Formats: CD, digital download	4	—N/a
Can't Stop Lovin' You	Released: July 6, 2010; Label: In Next Trend, CJ E&M; Formats: CD, digital download	3	—N/a
Always Be There	Released: October 31, 2013; Label: In Next Trend, CJ E&M; Formats: CD, digital download	—	—N/a

=== Singles ===
Title	Year	Peak chart positions	Sales (DL)	Album
Title	Year	KOR	Sales (DL)	Album
"I Would Love" (정말 사랑했을까)	2003	—	KOR: 26,863	Soul Free
"My Story"	2007	—		The Wind, The Sea, The Rain
"My Story" Live ver.	2008	—		Brown Eyed Soul Christmas Concert Live 2007
"Nothing Better" Live ver.	2008	46		Brown Eyed Soul Christmas Concert Live 2007
"I'll Move" (비켜줄께)	2010	3	KOR: 1,918,939	Browneyed Soul
"Love Ballad"	2010	5	KOR: 1,485,003	Browneyed Soul
"Can't Stop Lovin' You"	2010	21		Browneyed Soul
"That" (그대)	2010	15		Browneyed Soul
"If It's the Same" (똑같다면)	2010	1	KOR: 1,020,949	Browneyed Soul
"Let Me Go" (내려놔요)	2010	13		Athena OST
"Gone" Live ver.	2011	14	KOR: 559,838	Soul Fever
"Always Be There"	2013	3	KOR: 484,920	Soul Cooke
"You" (너를)	2013	3	KOR: 607,088	Soul Cooke
"Pass Me By"	2014	9	KOR: 202,203	Soul Cooke
"Melody of the Night" (밤의 멜로디)	2015	5	KOR: 332,079	Soul Cooke
"Home"	2015	11	KOR: 202,945	Soul Cooke
"Right" (featuring Sole)	2019	91	—N/a	It' Soul Right
"Night and Day" (그대의 밤, 나의 아침)	2019	45	—N/a	It' Soul Right
"Moments Like This" (우리들의 순간)	2025	83	—N/a	Soul Tricycle

=== Other charted songs ===
Title	Year	Peak chart positions	Sales (DL)	Album
Title	Year	KOR	Sales (DL)	Album
"Brown City"	2003	25	KOR: 447,153	Soul Free
"Blowin' My Mind"	2010	19	—N/a	I'll Move / Blowin My Mind
"Never Forget"	2010	39	—N/a	Love Ballad / Never Forget
"Love Ballad" Piano ver.	2010	98	—N/a	Love Ballad / Never Forget
"With Chocolate"	2010	22	—N/a	Browedeyed Soul
"Gone"	2010	34	—N/a	Browedeyed Soul
"Rainy"	2010	47	—N/a	Browedeyed Soul
"You"	2010	48	—N/a	Browedeyed Soul
"Tobacco Shop Girl" (담배가게 아가씨)	2010	56	—N/a	Browedeyed Soul
"He Is Real"	2010	67	—N/a	Browedeyed Soul
"Blowin' My Mind"	2010	73	—N/a	Browedeyed Soul
"Soul Breeze"	2010	86	—N/a	Browedeyed Soul
"Love Ballad"	2010	85	—N/a	Browedeyed Soul
"Your Song (Gratitude)"	2010	88	—N/a	Browedeyed Soul
"Can't Stop Loving You"	2010	89	—N/a	Browedeyed Soul
"Never Forget"	2010	91	—N/a	Browedeyed Soul
"I'll Move" (비켜줄께)	2010	94	—N/a	Browedeyed Soul
"I Would Love" (정말 사랑 했을까) Live ver.	2011	63	KOR: 201,988	Soul Fever
"You Are So Beautiful"	2013	44	KOR: 75,944	Thank Your Soul
"Philly Love Song"	2013	71	KOR: 33,246	Thank Your Soul
"How Much I Love You" (사랑의 말)	2015	30	KOR: 89,083	Soul Cooke
"What Words Say Love" (어떻게 너를 사랑하지 않을 수가 있겠어)	2015	31	KOR: 96,672	Soul Cooke
"You" (너를)	2015	37	KOR: 57,788	Soul Cooke
"Tender Eyes" feat. Tablo	2015	38	KOR: 55,862	Soul Cooke
"Stop.Stop" (그만.그만) feat. U Sung-eun	2015	42	KOR: 52,038	Soul Cooke
"Pass Me By"	2015	67	KOR: 39,927	Soul Cooke
"You Are So Beautiful"	2015	69	KOR: 39,270	Soul Cooke
"The Only Love"	2015	78	KOR: 37,981	Soul Cooke
"Rapture"	2015	80	KOR: 37,446	Soul Cooke
"Soul Cooke"	2015	83	KOR: 33,528	Soul Cooke
"Groove Midnight"	2015	84	KOR: 35,418	Soul Cooke
"Always Be There"	2015	89	KOR: 34,961	Soul Cooke
"BES Theme"	2015	91	KOR: 32,911	Soul Cooke
"Philly Love Song"	2015	95	KOR: 32,725	Soul Cooke
"Thank Your Soul"	2015	—	KOR: 30,334	Soul Cooke
"—" denotes releases that did not chart.

== Awards and nominations ==
Award	Year	Category	Nominee	Result	Ref.
Korean Music Awards	2008	R&B & Soul Musician of the Year – Netizen Vote	The Wind, The Sea, The Rain	Won	
Korean Music Awards	2008	Best R&B & Soul Album	The Wind, The Sea, The Rain	Nominated	
Korean Music Awards	2008	Best R&B & Soul Song	"My Story"	Nominated	
Korean Music Awards	2011	Best R&B & Soul Album	Browneyed Soul	Nominated	
Korean Music Awards	2011	Best R&B & Soul Song	"Never Forget"	Nominated	
Korean Music Awards	2020	Best R&B & Soul Song	"Night and Day" (그대의 밤, 나의 아침)	Nominated	
Mnet Asian Music Awards	2003	Best R&B Performance	"I Love You" (정말 사랑했을까)	Nominated	

== See also ==
- Brown Eyes
- Brown Eyed Girls
