= One Voice (Kyuhyun album) =

- Digital & CD only cover

Studio album by Kyuhyun
- Released: February 8, 2017
- Recorded: 2016
- Genre: J-pop
- Length: 42:26
- Language: Japanese
- Label: Avex Trax

Kyuhyun chronology
| Waiting, Still (2016) | One Voice (2017) | Goodbye for Now (2017) |

Singles from One Voice
- 1. "Celebration ～Kimini Kakeru Hashi～" Released: May 25, 2016; 2. "My Serious Love Comedy" Released: February 8, 2017

One Voice is the first Japanese album by South Korean singer Kyuhyun. It was released on February 8, 2017 through Avex Trax. The album reached number 1 on Oricon′s daily chart and it ranked number 1 on Oricon weekly album chart in less than a week. With this album, Kyuhyun became the first solo foreign male artist from a group to top the chart.

== Track listing ==
One Voice track listing
| No. | Title | Lyrics | Music | Length |
|---|---|---|---|---|
| 1. | "My Serious Love Comedy" (My Serious Romantic Comedy (僕のまじめなラブコメディー, Boku no majimena rabukomedī)) | Hidenori Tanaka | Hidenori Tanaka | 4:16 |
| 2. | "Celebration" (Kimi ni kakeru hashi (君に架ける橋, A Bridge to You)) | Shikata | Slipmats; Sky Beatz; Shikata | 4:01 |
| 3. | "Comet" (Hōkiboshi (箒星, Broom star)) | Kanata Okajima | Sweetch; Jerry.L; Suikon Blaz AD | 4:38 |
| 4. | "Terminal" | Hidenori Tanaka | Hide Nakamura; Yumiko Okada; Funk Uchino; Tom Diekmaier | 4:54 |
| 5. | "Lost My Way" | Erika Tsuchiya | Jay Lee; Cray Bin; Yoo Song-yeon | 3:55 |
| 6. | "Love to Love" | Hajime Watanabe | Zeenan-Jeong Jin Hwan; Andreas Bärtels | 3:12 |
| 7. | "Blah Blah" (Burabura (ブラブラ, Wandering around) (Japanese version)) | Hajime Watanabe; Yoon Jong-shin | Kang Hwa-sung | 4:34 |
| 8. | "Beautiful" | Hajime Watanabe | Cha Gil-wan; Lee Sang-jun | 3:52 |
| 9. | "At Gwanghwamun" (Kōkamon de (光化門で) (Japanese version)) | Kenzie; Natsumi Kobayashi | Kenzie | 4:46 |
| 10. | "In the Future We Meet Again by Chance" (Meguri au mirai de (めぐり逢う未来で, In the future we meet)) | Hidenori Tanaka | Kentaro Suzuki | 4:18 |
| Total length: | | | | 42:26 |

== Charts ==
Chart performance for One Voice
| Chart (2017) | Peak position |
|---|---|
| Japanese Albums (Oricon) | 1 |

== Release history ==
Release history for One Voice
| Region | Date | Format | Label | Ref |
|---|---|---|---|---|
| Japan | February 8, 2017 | CD; DVD | Avex Trax | |
| Various | February 8, 2017 | Digital download; streaming | Avex Trax | |
