= The Day We Felt Distance =

Single by Kyuhyun
- Released: 3 November 2015
- Recorded: 2015
- Studio: SM, Seoul, South Korea
- Genre: Pop; R&B; ballad
- Length: 4:02
- Songwriters: Mafly; ZigZagNote
- Producer: Lee Soo-man (executive)

Kyuhyun singles chronology
"A Million Pieces" (2015)	"The Day We Felt Distance" (2015)	"Blah Blah" (2016)

Music video
- "멀어지던 날 (The Day We Felt the Distance) on YouTube

"The Day We Felt Distance" (Korean: 멀어지던 날) is the first digital single by South Korean singer and actor Kyuhyun, a member from boy band Super Junior. It was released on November 3, 2015, by S.M. Entertainment.

== Composition ==
The song uses Bach's "Aria in G Minor" as a classical introduction, and is a ballad song that combines Kyuhyun's voice with a string orchestra. The song describes the departure of a couple's commitment towards each other. They were once lovers who had strong emotions and feelings towards one another, however after a long-term relationship they realises that the love they have for each other is no longer there, thus their relationship breaks apart. Through the emotional lyrics and instrumental, Kyuhyun aims to portray love in a sorrowful way. Colour contrast was also seen throughout the entire music video of "The Day We Felt The Distance" to express the change in feelings the lovers have for each other.

== Promotion ==
"The Day We Felt Distance" was released at midnight on 3 November 2015.

=== Solo concert ===
Kyuhyun's solo concert was held at the SMTOWN COEX Artium SMTOWN Theatre on November 6–8 and November 13–15, for a total of six shows. The tickets went on sale on October 1, 2015 (20:00KST) and was sold out within 46 seconds.

== Track listing ==
Digital
No.	Title	Lyrics	Music	Length
1.	"The Day We Felt The Distance" (멀어지던 날)	Mafly	ZigZagNote	04:02
Total length:				04:02

== Chart performance ==
Chart (2015)	Peak position	Sales
South Korean Gaon Weekly Singles Chart	14	326,114+ (digital downloads only)
South Korean Gaon Monthly Download Chart	40	326,114+ (digital downloads only)
