= When We Were Us (EP) =

- Digital cover

EP by Super Junior-K.R.Y.
- Released: June 8, 2020
- Recorded: 2020
- Studios: Doobdoob (Seoul); SM Big Shot (Seoul); SM Blue Cup (Seoul); SM LVYIN (Seoul); SM SSAM (Seoul); Vibe (Seoul)
- Length: 22:32
- Language: Korean
- Labels: SM; Label SJ; Dreamus
- Producer: Lee Soo-man

Singles from When We Were Us
- 1. "When We Were Us" Released: June 8, 2020

Music videos
- "When We Were Us" on YouTube

When We Were Us is the first extended play by South Korean boy band Super Junior-K.R.Y., a sub-unit of Super Junior. The EP is the group's first album since their debut in 2006.

== Track listing ==
No.	Title	Lyrics	Music	Arrangement	Length
1.	"When We Were Us" (푸르게 빛나던 우리의 계절; pureuge binnadeon uriui gyejeol; lit. 'Our Season Shined Blue')	4Beontaja	4Beontaja	4Beontaja; DG	4:07
2.	"Way to Busan" (부산에 가면; busane gamyeon; lit. 'If You Go To Busan')	Zeenan; OneTop; Oh Seung-eun	Zeenan; OneTop; Oh Seung-eun	Zeenan; OneTop	4:03
3.	"The Way Back to You" (너에게로; neoegero; lit. 'To You')	Lee Seu-ran	KAZFE; XLMT; YEL	KAZFE	3:29
4.	"I Can't" (할 수 없는 일; hal su eomneun il; lit. 'An Inability To Do')	Youngjun; Jeon Hong-joon	Youngjun; Jeon Hong-joon	Youngjun; Jeon Hong-joon	3:53
5.	"Home" (기대; gidae; lit. 'Expectation, Hope')	Son Ko-eun (MonoTree)	Son Ko-eun (MonoTree)	Son Ko-eun (MonoTree)	3:54
6.	"Midnight Story" (별의 동화; byeorui donghwa; lit. 'Star Fairy Tale')	4Beontaja	4Beontaja	4Beontaja	3:06
Total length:					22:32

== Charts ==
Weekly charts
Chart (2020)	Peak position
South Korean Albums (Gaon)	1
Japanese Albums (Oricon)	8
Japanese Hot Albums (Billboard Japan)	6
Japanese Download Albums (Billboard Japan)	2

== Release history ==
Release history for When We Were Us
Region	Date	Format	Label
South Korea	June 8, 2020	CD	SM; Label SJ; Dreamus
Various	June 8, 2020	Digital download; streaming	SM; Label SJ

== See also ==
- List of Gaon Album Chart number ones of 2020
