= Sung Hoon (singer, born 1980) =

South Korean singer (born 1980)

- 성훈
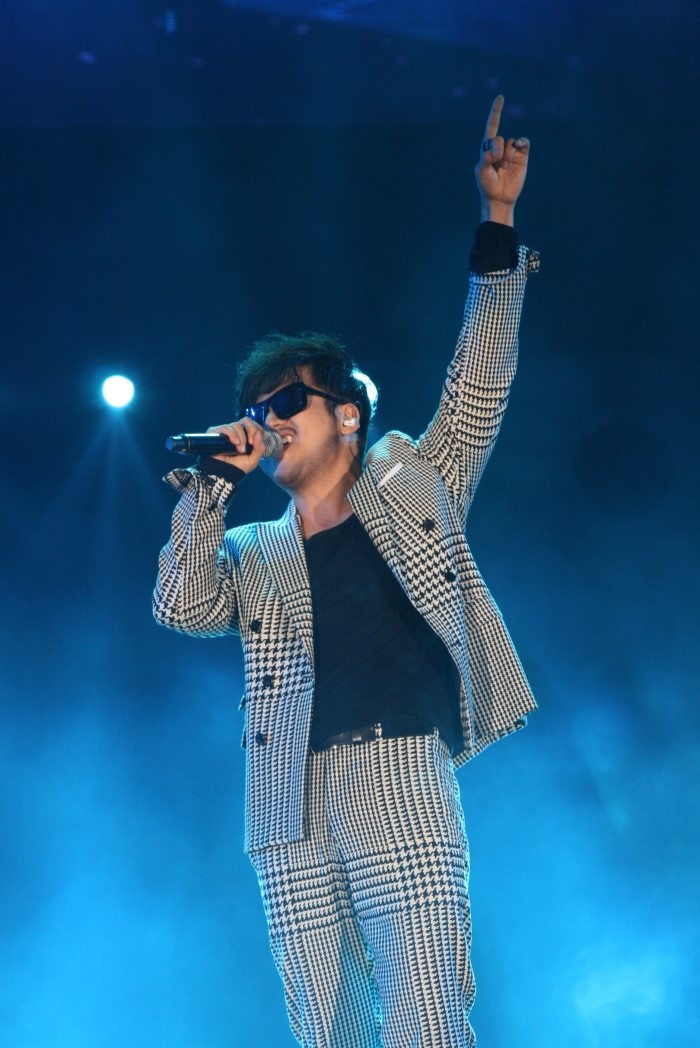
- Born: August 29, 1980 (age 45); Gyeryong, Chungcheongnam-do, South Korea
- Occupation: Singer
- Musical career
- Genres: R&B; ballad
- Instrument: Vocals
- Years active: 2003–present
- Label: In Next Music
- Member of: Brown Eyed Soul

Korean name
- Hangul: 성훈
- RR: Seong Hun
- MR: Sŏng Hun

Sung Hoon (Korean: 성훈, born August 29, 1980) is a South Korean singer and member of Brown Eyed Soul, signed under in Next Music. He released his debut solo album, Lyrics Within My Story, on September 22, 2011.

== Discography ==
=== Studio albums ===
Title	Album details	Peak chart positions	Sales
Title	Album details	KOR	Sales
Lyrics Within My Story	Released: September 22, 2011; Label: In Next Music, CJ E&M; Formats: CD, digital download	14	KOR: 1,892

=== Singles ===
Title	Year	Peak chart positions	Sales (DL)	Album
Title	Year	KOR	Sales (DL)	Album
"Rain U" with Sangsin, Hybrefine	2010	—	—N/a	non-album singles
"La Li La" (라리라) with Yeon	2011	71	—N/a	non-album singles
"Fail in Love"	2011	47	KOR: 319,109	Lyrics Within My Story
"Marry Me"	2011	45	KOR: 293,087	Lyrics Within My Story
"Ma Boo" feat. San E	2012	71	KOR: 66,297	non-album singles
"No Matter" (아무리) feat. Kim Jin-pyo	2012	38	KOR: 159,368	non-album singles
"I Love You" (널 사랑해)	2015	70	KOR: 49,758	Brown Eyed Soul Single Project
"Re-Luv" feat. Skull	2017	—	—N/a	non-album single
"—" denotes releases that did not chart.

=== Soundtrack appearances ===
Year	Title	Album
2012	"I See You" (그대를 봅니다)	Faith OST
2013	"Goodbye Is Coming" (이별이 오나 봐)	Man in Love OST
2017	"Something"	I'm Not a Robot OST
