= Hyena (soundtrack) =

Soundtrack album
- Released: November 3, 2006
- Genre: K-pop, jazz, blues
- Language: Korean
- Label: SM Entertainment
- Producer: Lee Soo-man

Hyena (하이에나) is the name of a soundtrack released in 2006 for the Korean drama of the same title, which aired on tvN and starred Kim Min-jong, Yoon Da-hoon, Oh Man-seok and Shin Sung-rok.

== Track listing ==
1. The Night Chicago Died - Super Junior-K.R.Y.
2. Go! Go! - TRAX
3. 한 사람만을 (The One I Love) - Super Junior-K.R.Y.
4. 0 (영; 零) - Seo Hyun-jin
5. Smile - Kyuhyun (Super Junior)
6. Bossa Cha Cha - Lee Yoon-jae
7. My Tears - TRAX
8. 그대 떠나가는 길에 (You Go Away on the Road) - Chu Ga-yeoul
9. Drive
10. 한 사람만을 (The One I Love) (Instrumental)
