= Youngjun =

South Korean singer (born 1978)

- 고영준
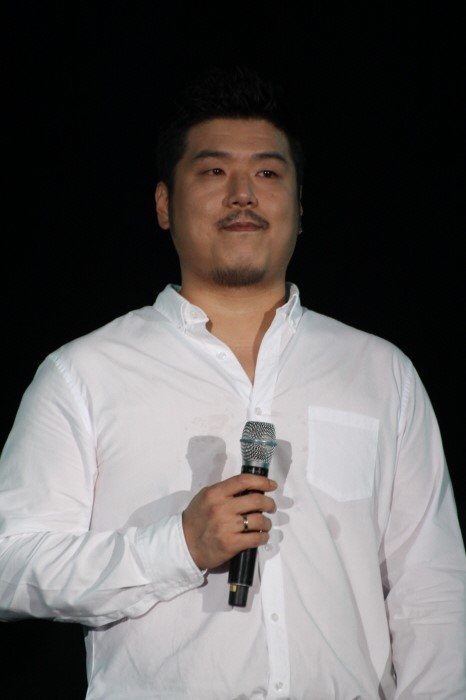
- Born: Go Young-jun; December 28, 1978 (age 46); Seoul, South Korea
- Occupation: Singer
- Musical career
- Genres: R&B; ballad
- Instrument: Vocals
- Years active: 2003–present
- Labels: In Next Music
- Member of: Brown Eyed Soul

Korean name
- Hangul: 고영준
- RR: Go Yeongjun
- MR: Ko Yŏngjun

Go Young-jun (Korean: 고영준, born December 28, 1978), better known by the mononym Youngjun (영준), is a South Korean singer and member of Brown Eyed Soul, signed under in Next Music. He released his debut solo album, Easy, on January 20, 2012.

== Discography ==
=== Studio albums ===
Title	Album details	Peak chart positions	Sales
Title	Album details	KOR	Sales
Easy	Released: January 20, 2012; Label: In Next Music, CJ E&M; Formats: CD, digital download	10	KOR: 1,547

=== Extended plays ===
Title	Album details	Peak chart positions	Sales
Title	Album details	KOR	Sales
Ames Room with Supreme Team	Released: October 1, 2010; Label: LOEN Entertainment; Formats: CD, digital download	4	—

=== Singles ===
Title	Year	Peak chart positions	Sales (DL)	Album
Title	Year	KOR	Sales (DL)	Album
"Why" (왜)	2008	—	—	Non-album single
"Why" (왜) with Supreme Team	2010	1	—	Ames Room
"Then Then Then" (그땐 그땐 그땐) with Supreme Team	2010	1	—	Ames Room
"Pray" feat. Molly D, Doohoon	2011	48	KOR: 190,242	Non-album single
"You Over Flowers" (꽃보다 그대가) feat. Simon Dominic	2011	5	KOR: 672,418	Easy
"Forget" (잊어요)	2012	17	KOR: 388,418	Easy
"Driving Road" feat. Paloalto	2013	53	KOR: 48,431	Non-album single
"Think Of You" (니 생각뿐) feat. Gary	2015	46	KOR: 67,881	Brown Eyed Soul Single Project
"Summer Of Beginning" (시작의 여름) feat. Ryu Su-jeong	2016	—	—	Non-album singles
"Moon Night" (달밤)	2016	—	—	Non-album singles
"Spring Rain" (봄비) feat. Soyee	2017	—	—	Non-album singles
"—" denotes releases that did not chart.

=== Soundtrack appearances ===
Year	Title	Album
2011	"Now" (이제)	Crying Fist OST
2012	"Song of Wind" (바람의 노래)	Faith OST
2014	"Is It Love?" (사랑이 된 걸까?)	My Secret Hotel
