= Colors (Kyuhyun album) =

- Digital cover

Studio album by Kyuhyun
- Released: November 27, 2024
- Studios: Antenna (Seoul); Bao Company (Seoul); Kara (Seoul); NYM (Seoul); Seoul
- Genres: K-pop; rock
- Length: 34:41
- Language: Korean
- Labels: Antenna; Kakao

Kyuhyun chronology
| Restart (2024) | Colors (2024) | The Classic (2025) |

Singles from Colors
- 1. "Unending Days" Released: November 27, 2024

Music video
- "Unending Days" on YouTube

Colors is the first Korean studio album (second overall) by South Korean singer Cho Kyu-hyun. It was released on November 27, 2024, by Antenna. The album consists of ten tracks in total, including the lead single, "Unending Days".

== Background ==
On October 28, 2024, Antenna announced that Kyuhyun would release his first full-length album on his tenth year solo debut anniversary. On November 8, 2024, Antenna dropped the timeline video which included the schedule for this album. Starting from November 12, 2024, Kyuhyun dropped the concept photos for his album, including calmness, maturity, yourself and keynote version.

On November 14, 2024, he released the track list of his album. He was involved in the composition of the first track and last track.

On November 24, the music video teaser of the title track, "Unending Days" was released.

== Promotion ==
The music video for its lead single was released on the same day as the album's release.

=== Concert tour ===
On the same day of the announcement of his first full-length album, Antenna also announced that Kyuhyun will embark on his tenth anniversary Asia tour of the same name. The tour would start in Seoul, South Korea from December 20 to December 22, 2024, with the tour set to continue through to April 2025, in other Asian countries such as Japan, Hong Kong, Taiwan, Indonesia, Thailand and the Philippines.

== Track listing ==
Colors track listing
| No. | Title | Lyrics | Music | Arrangement | Length |
|---|---|---|---|---|---|
| 1. | "Prologue" (어느 봄날; Eoneu bomnal; 'One spring day') | | Kyuhyun; Hong Seok-min; Seo Dong-hwan | Seo Dong-hwan | 1:08 |
| 2. | "Unending Days" (하루마다 끝도 없이; Harumada kkeutdo eopsi; 'Day after day endlessly') | Sim Hyun-bo | Robbin; Rick Bridges; Jonghan; Ji Woo-geun | Robbin; Ji Woo-geun | 3:07 |
| 3. | "Journey" (기지개; Gijigae; 'Stretch') | Kim Ji-hyang | Seo Jeong-jin | Seo Jeong-jin; Kim Woo-seong | 3:37 |
| 4. | "Universe" | Seion | Lee Min-yeong; Seion; Yeul | 1by1 | 3:38 |
| 5. | "Bring It On" | Siyeong; iHwak | iHwak; Royal Dive; Siyeong | Royal Dive | 3:16 |
| 6. | "Last Poem" | minGtion; Junny | minGtion; Junny | Junny | 3:59 |
| 7. | "Nights Without You" (슬픈 밤; Seulpeun bam; 'A sad night') | Hickee; You Hee-yeol | Hickee; Couch Peach; Lee Gyeong-rim | Hemiyola; Seo Dong-hwan | 3:47 |
| 8. | "Horizon" (수평선; Supyeongseon) | Kwon Soon-kwan | Kwon Soon-kwan | Kwon Soon-kwan | 4:21 |
| 9. | "Wishes" (지금 여기, 너; Jigeum yeogi, neo; 'Right now, here, you') | Kim Ah-hyeon | Humbler; Lee Seung-ho | Humbler; Lee Seung-ho | 4:26 |
| 10. | "One Spring Day" (어느 봄날; Eoneu bomnal) | Kyuhyun; Hong Seok-min | Kyuhyun; Hong Seok-min | Hong Seok-min | 3:22 |
| Total length: | | | | | 34:41 |

== Charts ==
=== Weekly charts ===
Weekly chart performance for Colors
| Chart (2024) | Peak position |
|---|---|
| Japanese Albums (Oricon) | 22 |
| Japanese Combined Albums (Oricon) | 43 |
| Japanese Download Albums (Billboard Japan) | 24 |
| South Korean Albums (Circle) | 11 |

=== Monthly charts ===
Monthly chart performance for Colors
| Chart (2024) | Position |
|---|---|
| South Korean Albums (Circle) | 40 |

== Release history ==
Release history for Colors
| Region | Date | Format | Label |
|---|---|---|---|
| South Korea | November 27, 2024 | CD | Antenna; Kakao |
| Various | November 27, 2024 | Digital download; streaming | Antenna |
