= Super Junior-K.R.Y. =

Subgroup of the South Korean boy band Super Junior

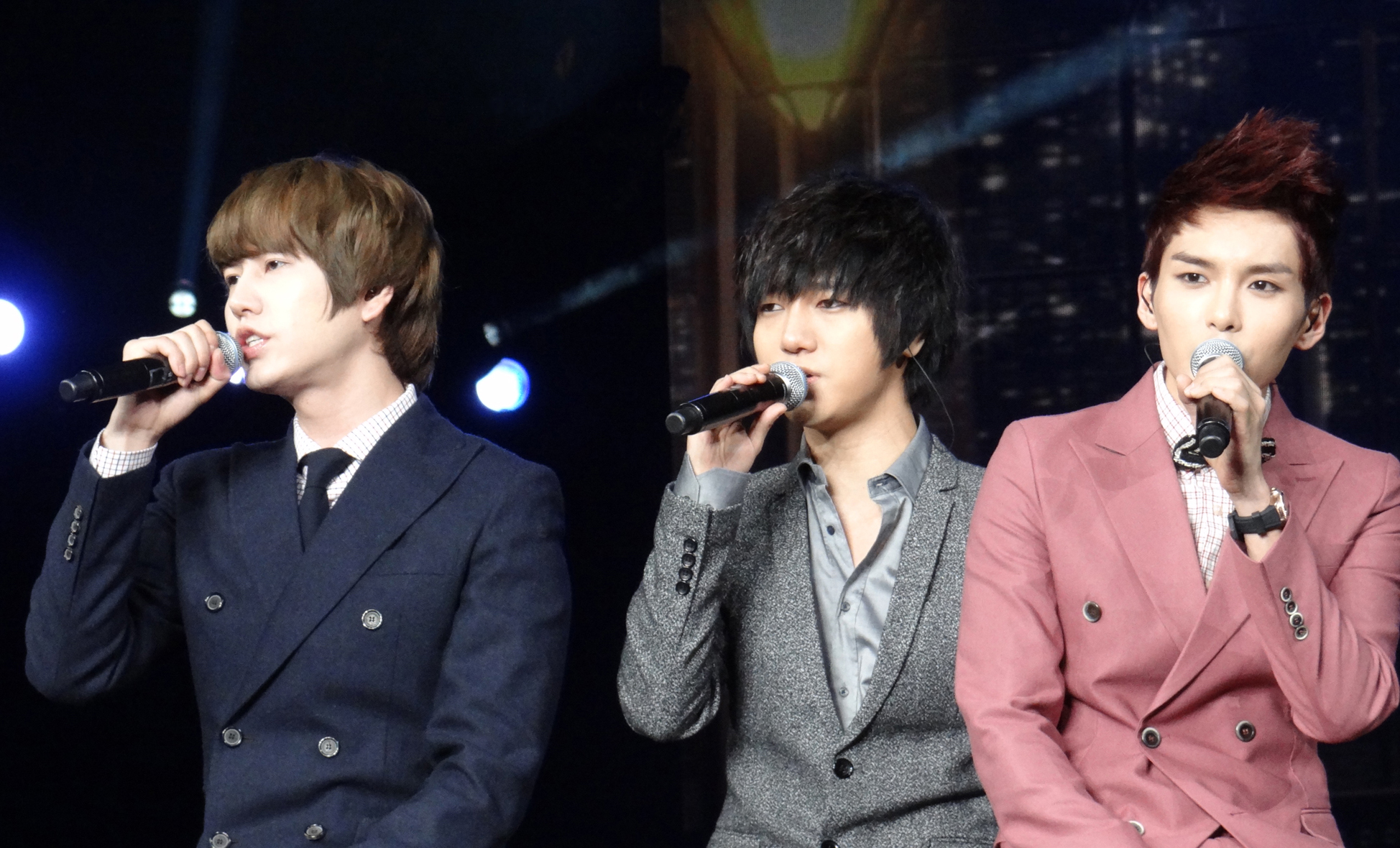
- Super Junior-K.R.Y. in 2011 (from left: Kyuhyun, Yesung & Ryeowook)

Background information
- Also known as: SJ-K.R.Y.; KRY
- Origin: Seoul, South Korea
- Genres: Pop; R&B; ballad; rock
- Years active: 2006–present
- Labels: SM; Label SJ; Avex Trax
- Spinoff of: Super Junior; SM Town
- Members: Yesung; Ryeowook; Kyuhyun
- Website: Official website superjunior-jp.net/kry

Super Junior-K.R.Y. is the first sub-unit of South Korean boy band Super Junior, composed of the three main vocalists of Super Junior: Kyuhyun, Ryeowook, and Yesung. The trio were widely known as the "First Sub-unit of K-pop".

== History ==
During the year 2006, Kyuhyun, Ryeowook and Yesung under the name Super Junior-K.R.Y. (from the first letter of the members' stage names) released two original soundtrack titled "The Night Chicago Died" and "The One I Love" for the tvN drama Hyena. On November 5, 2006, they debuted on the music program Music Bank with performing "The One I Love". Since then, they have released several original soundtracks for Korean television dramas. They made their first overseas performance on March 17, 2007, at the 6th Pattaya International Music Festival in Thailand, where they performed to 10,000 people.

Super Junior-K.R.Y. held their first concert tour in Asia in 2010–2011. The tour commenced in Tokyo in August 2010 and continued onto Kobe, Taipei, Fukuoka, Seoul, and concluding in Nanjing, China. Over 22,000 people attended the tour. Super Junior members Donghae, Sungmin and Heechul made special guest appearances at the Seoul concerts, as well as labelmates Shinee and TRAX.

Super Junior K.R.Y. Special Winter Concert 2012 was held in Yokohama on November 19–21 with 15,000 fans in the audience. Super Junior K.R.Y. released some tracks and a teaser video from their upcoming Japanese single "Promise You" for the first time at the concerts. Tickets for the concerts in Yokohama went on sale on October 27 and were sold out in three seconds. There were performances in Kobe and Tokyo in December and January. The tour mobilised 36,000 people in Tokyo, with a total of 72,000 in all three cities and nine concerts. The application for the tickets was over 1,500,000, and proved their popularity in Japan.

Super Junior-K.R.Y. released their first official single in Japan titled "Promise You" on January 23, 2013, and debuted at number two on Oricon's daily singles chart. In total, the single album sold 40,645 copies on its first day of sales on January 23. In the next day the single album ranked 1st place by selling 15,197 copies. In the first week of sales "Promise You" sold 69,067 copies, ranking 2nd place in Oricon Weekly Chart. On May 6, 2013, member Yesung was enlisted for his mandatory military service. It made the sub-group hiatus from their activities.

Yesung completed his mandatory military service on May 4, 2015. They continued their activities as a trio with held Japanese tour, starting in Yokohama on June 2–3 and had 11 total performances in arenas in Kobe, Fukuoka and Nagoya. In June 2015, the trio announced will be released their second Japanese single titled "Join Hands" on 5 August 2015. In July 2015, SM Entertainment announced Super Junior-K.R.Y. will be held their Asia tour started at the Seoul's Olympic Hall on August 22 and 23. Ryeowook enlisted for his military service on 11 October 2016 while Kyuhyun enlisted for his military service on May 25, 2017. As a result, the sub-group has temporarily halted their activities. Ryeowook and Kyuhyun were discharged on July 10, 2018, and May 7, 2019, respectively.

They made their comeback appearance at the Jeddah Season Festival on July 13, 2019. On December 31, 2019, they performed at Taoyuan New Year's Eve stage in Taiwan.

In May 2020, it was announced that Super Junior K.R.Y will have their first Korean release since their unit's debut in 2006, with an EP titled When We Were Us, which was released on June 8. The EP is part of a chain of activities to celebrate 15 years since formation for Super Junior, from 2005 till 2020. They subsequently released a Japanese single, "Traveler" on October 27, with the Japanese version of "When We Were Us" as its B-side. The single peaked at number one on Oricon Daily Singles Chart.

== Discography ==
Super Junior-K.R.Y. discography
- Extended plays: 1
- Singles: 4
- Music videos: 8
- Soundtracks: 8

=== Extended plays ===
Title	Album details	Peak chart positions		Sales
Title	Album details	KOR	JPN	Sales
When We Were Us	Released: June 8, 2020; Format: CD, digital download streaming; Label: SM Entertainment	1	8	KOR: 155,678; JPN: 5,003

=== Singles ===
Title	Year	Peak chart positions		Sales	Album
Title	Year	KOR	JPN	Sales	Album
"Promise You"	2013	— (Note: Did not enter Gaon Digital Chart but peaked at no 1 on Gaon Album Chart as a single album)	2	JPN: 76,457+ (DL)	Non-album single
"Join Hands"	2015	—	3	JPN: 34,152+ (DL)	Non-album single
"When We Were Us" (푸르게 빛나던 우리의 계절)	2020	143	—		When We Were Us
"Traveler"	2020	—	2	JPN: 16,394	Non-album single

=== Soundtrack appearances ===
Title	Year	Peak Chart Positions	Album
Title	Year	KOR	Album
"The Night Chicago Died"	2006	—	Hyena
"The One I Love"	2006	—	Hyena
"Stop Walking By"	2006	—	Snow Flower
"Just You"	2007	—	Billie Jean, Look at Me
"Dreaming Hero"	2009	—	Partner
"Fly"	2011	52	Superstar K3
"Sky"	2012	—	To the Beautiful You
"Loving You"	2012	—	Miss Panda and Mr. Hedgehog
"Shadow of You" (그림자 사랑)	2021	— (Note: "Shadow of You" did not enter the Gaon Digital Chart but peaked at number 55 on the component Download Chart.)	The King's Affection OST Part 1

=== Other appearances ===
Title	Year	Peak chart positions	Sales	Album
Title	Year	KOR	Sales	Album
"회상 (Reminiscence)"	2012	38	KOR (DL): 261,698	Yoon Il Sang 21st Anniversary 'I’m 21' Part 2

== Videography ==
Year	Track	Album
2006	"The one I love"	Hyena OST
2011	"Fly"	Superstar K3 OST
2012	"Reminiscence"	Yoon Il Sang's 21st Anniversary Album
2013	"Promise You"	Promise You
2013	"Hana Mizuki"	Hero
2015	"Join Hands"	Join Hands
2020	"When We Were Us"	When We Were Us
2020	"Traveler"	—N/a

== Concert tours ==
Asia Tour

- Super Junior-K.R.Y. The 1st Concert (2010–2011)
- Super Junior-K.R.Y. Asia Tour Phonograph (2015)

Japan Tour

- Super Junior-K.R.Y. Special Winter Concert (2012–2013)
- Super Junior-K.R.Y. Japan Tour Phonograph (2015)

Online concerts

- Super Junior-K.R.Y. - The Moment With Us (2020)

== Awards and nominations ==
The name of the award ceremony, year presented, nominee(s) of the award, award category, and the result of the nomination
Year	Award ceremony	Category	Nominee(s)	Result	Ref.
2021	Golden Disc Awards	Curaprox Popularity Award	Super Junior-K.R.Y	Nominated	
2021	Golden Disc Awards	QQ Music Popularity Award	Super Junior-K.R.Y	Nominated	
2021	Golden Disc Awards	Disc Bonsang	When We Were Us	Nominated	
