= At Gwanghwamun =

- Album cover for At Gwanghwamun

EP by Kyuhyun
- Released: November 13, 2014
- Recorded: 2014
- Studio: In Grid (Seoul); Seoul; Sound Pool (Seoul)
- Genre: Pop; R&B; soul
- Length: 28:57; 33:39 (digital download only)
- Language: Korean
- Label: SM; KT Music
- Producer: Lee Soo-man

Kyuhyun chronology
At Gwanghwamun (2014)	Fall, Once Again (2015)

Singles from At Gwanghwamun
- 1. "At Gwanghwamun" Released: November 13, 2014

Music video
- "At Gwanghwamun" on YouTube

At Gwanghwamun (Korean: 광화문에서; RR: Gwanghwamuneseo) is debut extended play by South Korean singer Kyuhyun. It was released on November 13, 2014, by SM Entertainment and distributed by KT Music. The EP features seven tracks in total, including the lead single which shares the same name as the title of the album.

== Background ==
On November 6, 2014, it was announced that Super Junior's youngest member Kyuhyun would be releasing his very first solo mini-album, At Gwanghwamun, which would be released on November 13, making him the fourth solo artist of S.M. Entertainment in a little over a year, following Super Junior-M's Henry (Fantastic), SHINee's Taemin (Ace), and Zhou Mi, another Super Junior-M member who recently had a solo debut stage with Rewind on November 3.

Along with releasing multiple autumn-themed teaser images, the singer has uploaded several short teaser snippets onto his official Twitter account. Each of the teasers were only a few seconds in length, but gave his fans an opportunity to sample the upcoming mini-album.

== Release ==
On November 13, 2014, Kyuhyun released his first EP through various music sites, and the title track on 12 midnight (KST). The lead single immediately took the first spot on nine of real time charts such as MelOn, Genie, Soribada, Daum Music, Naver Music, Mnet, Olleh Music, Bugs and Monkey3, thus achieving an "all-kill". Not only his title song hit the charts, but all of his tracks made their way to top 10 positions in most of the music sites.

On November 26, 2014, Kyuhyun released Chinese version for title track "At Gwanghwamun".

== Composition ==
The title track "At Gwanghwamun" (Korean: 광화문에서; RR: Gwanghwamun-eseo) was composed and written by well-known composer of S.M. Entertainment, Kenzie. It is a sad ballad song that talks about painful break-up, giving an autumn feeling that many listeners would love to hear. Kyuhyun's sweet and emotional voice could be heard in the song's background, accompanied by string instruments and drums.

The EP also gained a lot of attention for its track listing, which includes "Eternal Sunshine," composed by the world-famous pianist Yiruma along with 2FACE, as well as "My Thoughts, Your Memories" (Korean: 나의 생각, 너의 기억; RR: Naui Saenggak, Neoui Gieok) composed by the artist himself, with lyrics from TVXQ's Changmin who is known to be a good friend of his.

== Track listing ==
CD/Digital download
No.	Title	Lyrics	Music	Length
1.	"At Gwanghwamun" (광화문에서; Gwanghwamuneseo)	Kenzie	Kenzie	4:42
2.	"Eternal Sunshine"	Yang Jae Seon	Yiruma, 2Face	4:15
3.	"At Close" (뒷모습이 참 예뻤구나; Dwinmoseubi cham yeppeotguna; 'From the back, You looked very pretty')	Honeydew'O	Honeydew'O	3:56
4.	"Moment of Farewell" (이별을 말할 때; Ibyeoreul malhal ttae; 'The time to say goodbye')	Swan	Kim Tae Sung, Kim Yong Shin, 220	3:35
5.	"One Confession" (사랑이 숨긴 말들; Sarangi sumgin maldeul; 'Words hidden by love')	Yang Jae-seon	Yoon Young-jun	4:31
6.	"Flying, Deep in the Night" (깊은 밤을 날아서)	Lee Young-hoon	Lee Young-hoon, Kenzie	3:23
7.	"My Thoughts, Your Memories" (나의 생각, 너의 기억; Naui saenggak, neoui gieok)	Changmin	Kyuhyun, Hwang Sung-je	4:31
Total length:				28:57

Digital download only
No.	Title	Lyrics	Music	Length
8.	"At Gwanghwamun" (Chinese: 在光化门; pinyin: Zài Guānghuàmén; Chinese version)	Kenzie	Kenzie	4:42
Total length:				33:39

Notes

- Track 6 is a cover version of the song under the same title, which was originally performed by South Korean singer-songwriter Lee Moon-se, from his fourth studio album When Love Passes By released in 1987.

== Charts ==
Chart (2014)	Peak position	Sales
2014 Gaon Weekly Albums Chart	1	KOR: 72,824+
2014 Gaon Monthly Albums Chart	1	KOR: 72,824+
2014 Gaon Year-End Albums Chart	35	KOR: 72,824+
US Billboard World Albums Chart	2	KOR: 72,824+

== Awards and nominations ==
=== Annual music awards ===
Year	Award	Category	Recipient	Result
2015	24th Seoul Music Awards	Bonsang (Main Prize)	At Gwanghwamun	Nominated
2015	24th Seoul Music Awards	High1/Mobile Popularity Award	Kyuhyun	Nominated
2015	24th Seoul Music Awards	Hallyu Special Award	Kyuhyun	Nominated
2015	17th Mnet Asian Music Awards	Artist of the Year	Kyuhyun	Nominated
2015	17th Mnet Asian Music Awards	Best Male Artist	Kyuhyun	Nominated
2015	17th Mnet Asian Music Awards	Best Male Vocal Performance	At Gwanghwamun	Nominated
2015	17th Mnet Asian Music Awards	Song of the Year	At Gwanghwamun	Nominated
2016	30th Golden Disk Awards	Disk Bonsang	At Gwanghwamun	Nominated
2016	30th Golden Disk Awards	Digital Bonsang	At Gwanghwamun	Won

=== Music program awards ===
Song	Program	Date
"At Gwanghwamun"	M! Countdown (Mnet)	November 20, 2014
"At Gwanghwamun"	M! Countdown (Mnet)	November 27, 2014
"At Gwanghwamun"	Music Bank (KBS)	November 21, 2014
"At Gwanghwamun"	Show! Music Core (MBC)	November 22, 2014
"At Gwanghwamun"	Show Champion (MBC Music)	November 26, 2014

== Release history ==
Release history for At Gwanghamun
Region	Date	Format	Label
South Korea	November 13, 2014	CD	SM; KT Music
Various	November 13, 2014	Digital download; streaming	SM

== See also ==
- List of K-pop on the Billboard charts
- List of number-one albums of 2014 (South Korea)
