= Waiting, Still =

- Digital cover

EP by Kyuhyun
- Released: November 10, 2016
- Recorded: 2016
- Studio: Doobdoob (Seoul); In Grid (Seoul); Seoul; SM Blue Ocean (Seoul); SM Yellow Tail (Seoul)
- Genre: Pop
- Length: 28:59
- Language: Korean
- Label: SM; Label SJ; KT Music
- Producer: Tak Young-jun

Kyuhyun chronology
Fall, Once Again (2015)	Waiting, Still (2016)	One Voice (2017)

Singles from Waiting, Still
- 1. "Blah Blah" Released: November 10, 2016; 2. "Still" Released: November 10, 2016

Music video
- Blah Blah on YouTube; Still on YouTube

Waiting, Still is the third extended play by South Korean singer Kyuhyun, a member of Super Junior. It was released on November 10, 2016, by Label SJ, SM Entertainment and distributed by KT Music. The album contains with seven tracks, including the lead singles, "Blah Blah" and "Still".

== Track listing ==
Waiting, Still track listing
No.	Title	Lyrics	Music	Arrangement	Length
1.	"Blah Blah" (블라블라; Beullabeulla)	Yoon Jong-shin	Yoon Jong-shin; Kang Hwa-seong	Kang Hwa-seong	4:33
2.	"Last Good-bye" (조용히 안녕; Joyonghi annyeong; 'Silent goodbye')	Shim Eun-jee	Shim Eun-jee	Shim Eun-jee	4:32
3.	"Still" (여전히 아늑해; Yeojeonhi aneukhae; 'Still cozy')	Shim Eun-jee	Sung Si-kyung	Melodesign	4:03
4.	"Fall in You" (네 안의 가을; Ne anui gaeul)	G-High; GDLO (MonoTree)	G-High; GDLO (MonoTree)	G-High; GDLO (MonoTree)	3:38
5.	"Love in Time" (시절인연; Sijeorinyeon; 'Days of fate')	Nuplay	Nuplay	Nuplay	4:27
6.	"When with Me" (마음세탁소; Maeumsetakso; 'Heart laundromat')	CLEF Crew	CLEF Crew	CLEF Crew	4:04
7.	"And We" (그리고 우리; Geurigo uri)	CLEF Crew	CLEF Crew	CLEF Crew	4:22

== Charts ==
Chart performance for Waiting, Still
Chart (2016)	Peak position
Japanese Albums (Oricon)	41
South Korean Albums (Gaon)	5

== Release history ==
Release dates and formats for Waiting, Still
Region	Date	Format	Label
South Korea	November 10, 2016	CD	SM; Label SJ; KT Music
Various	November 10, 2016	Digital download; streaming	SM; Label SJ
