= Fall, Once Again =

- Digital cover

EP by Kyuhyun
- Released: 15 October 2015
- Recorded: 2015
- Studio: Doobdoob (Seoul); In Grid (Seoul); Seoul; Sound Pool (Seoul)
- Genre: Pop; R&B
- Length: 30:05
- Language: Korean
- Label: SM; KT Music
- Producer: Lee Soo-man

Kyuhyun chronology
At Gwanghwamun (2014)	Fall, Once Again (2015)	Waiting, Still (2016)

Singles from Fall, Once Again
- 1. "A Million Pieces" Released: October 15, 2015

Music video
- "A Million Pieces" on YouTube

Fall, Once Again (다시, 가을이 오면; Dasi, gaeuri omyeon) is the second extended play (EP) by South Korean singer Cho Kyu-hyun. It was released on October 15, 2015, by SM Entertainment and distributed by KT Music. The EP featured seven tracks in total, including the lead single, "A Million Pieces".

== Background ==
Kyuhyun established himself as the crown prince of ballads through his first solo album At Gwanghwamun, which swept music, album and music video charts, as well as music programs, when it was released in November 2014. Crowned the vocalist of fall with "At Gwanghwamun", Kyuhyun's second solo album Fall, Once Again garnered interest as one of the most-anticipated albums of the season.

Fall, Once Again was released at midnight on 15 October 2015, and was expected "to blow through the fall season like a gust of wind once again."

== Production and composition ==
"A Million Pieces" was written by Kenzie and the song compares a precious love to stars in the night sky to stimulate the fans' sense of fall; the classical and classy melody harmonized well with Kyuhyun's sweet voice. "A Million Pieces" is a seasonal ballad that features a refined melody and emotional lyrics brought to life by Kyuhyun's captivating voice.

== Promotion ==
=== Release ===
Ahead of the album release, Kyuhyun released a surprise comeback promo clip parodying a famous commercial that was debuted through Naver Starcast at noon on 8 October 2015. F(x) member Amber produced and appeared in the comical clip to support Kyuhyun in his comeback, further heightening anticipation for his upcoming album.

On 15 October 2015, the "A Million Pieces" music video was released through Kyuhyun's official website and SMTOWN's YouTube channel. It captured the viewer's attention with the film-like quality.

=== Live performance ===
Kyuhyun kicked off his comeback and performed his lead single "A Million Pieces" for the first time on the Korean music show M! Countdown on 15 October 2015.

=== Solo concert ===
Kyuhyun's solo concert was held at the SMTOWN COEX Artium SMTOWN Theatre from November 6–8 and November 13–15, for a total of six shows.

== Track listing ==
CD/Digital
No.	Title	Lyrics	Music	Length
1.	"A Million Pieces" (밀리언조각; Millieonjogak)	Kenzie	Kenzie	05:12
2.	"Remember Me" (좋은사람; Joeunsaram; 'Good person')	Jung Joon Il	Jung Joon Il	04:39
3.	"Autumn Sleeves" (긴 팔; Gin pal; 'Long arms')	Polar Bear	Polar Bear	03:54
4.	"Piano Forest" (피아노 숲; Piano sup)	4th Hitter	4th Hitter	03:45
5.	"Because I Miss You" (그냥 보고 싶어 그래; Geunyang bogo sipeo geurae; 'I just want to see you')	4th Hitter, Kim Seong Jong	4th Hitter, Kim Seong Jong	03:53
6.	"Wind" (바람; Baram)	Hwang Hyun & Shin Agnes (MonoTree)	Hwang Hyun (MonoTree)	03:21
7.	"Ways to Say Goodbye" (안녕의 방식; Annyeongui bangsik)	Hwang Seong Je	Cho Kyu-hyun	05:21
Total length:				30:05

== Charts ==
Chart (2015)	Peak position	Sales
South Korean Gaon Weekly Albums Chart	1	KOR: 45,441+
South Korean Gaon Monthly Albums Chart	6	KOR: 45,441+
South Korean Gaon Year-End Albums Chart	55	KOR: 45,441+

== Release history ==
Release history for Fall, Once Again
Region	Date	Format	Label
South Korea	October 15, 2015	CD	SM; KT Music
Various	October 15, 2015	Digital download; streaming	SM
