= Cho Kyu-hyun =

South Korean singer (born 1988)

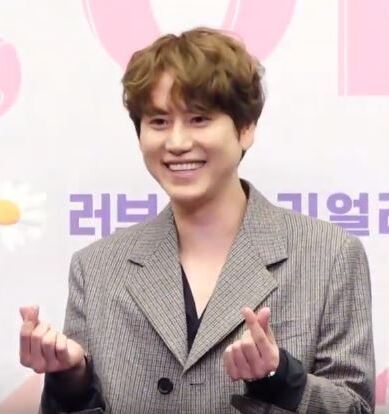
- Kyuhyun in 2019

Background information
- Born: February 3, 1988 (age 38); Seoul, South Korea
- Genres: K-pop; R&B
- Occupations: Singer; musical theatre actor; television host
- Instrument: Vocals
- Years active: 2006–present
- Labels: SM; Label SJ; Antenna
- Member of: Super Junior; Super Junior-K.R.Y.; Super Junior-M; SM Town
- Formerly of: SM the Ballad
- Website: Official website

Korean name
- Hangul: 조규현
- RR: Jo Gyuhyeon
- MR: Cho Kyuhyŏn

Signature
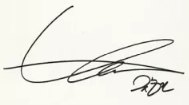

Cho Kyu-hyun (Korean: 조규현; born February 3, 1988), referred to as Kyuhyun, is a South Korean singer, musical theatre actor, and television host. He debuted as a new member of boy group Super Junior (and later its sub-groups Super Junior-K.R.Y. and Super Junior-M as well as former member of SM Entertainment project group SM the Ballad) in May 2006. Apart from his group's activities, he has established himself as a musical actor, notably through his participation in the original and Korean versions of stage musicals including The Three Musketeers, Catch Me If You Can, Moon Embracing the Sun, Singin' in the Rain, The Days, Robin Hood, Werther, Mozart!, The Man Who Laughs, Phantom, and Frankenstein. He was also cast in television shows including Radio Star, We Got Married, Mamma Mia, Fluttering India and in the third, fourth, seventh, and eighth seasons of New Journey to the West. He debuted as a solo artist with his debut mini album, At Gwanghwamun, on November 13, 2014, making him the first Super Junior member to debut as a solo artist.

He is one of the first four Korean artists to appear on Chinese postage stamps.

== Early life ==
Kyuhyun was born in Nowon District, Seoul, a northeastern part of the city. His father, Cho Young-hwan, worked for the Korean Housing Corporation before opening various educational institutes in Korea. Kyuhyun's mother, Kim Hanna, pursued business ventures such as establishing an art academy, as well as a guesthouse (MOM House) located in Myeongdong. Kyuhyun also has an older sister, Ara, a violinist who studied abroad in Vienna, Austria, before returning to Korea to teach the violin.

Kyuhyun was initially urged to study law by his parents and later said that it would have been his choice in career had he not become a singer. His original plans to go into law were abandoned once he joined a band in high school, where he realized his talents in singing. He went on to place third in the Chin Chin Singing Competition in 2005 and entered SM Entertainment the following year. He faced strong opposition from his father, but then later agreed to grant his blessings if Kyuhyun was accepted into a prestigious university. Kyuhyun subsequently enrolled in Kyunghee University with a major in Post-Modern Music and received his bachelor's degree in 2013. In 2016, he completed his master's degree in Post-Modern Music at the same university with master's dissertation entitled, "A Study on the Current Status and Future Development of K-POP: K-POP Advancement Strategies to America and Europe based on the Success Stories of K-POP in Japan and China".

== Career ==
=== 2006–2009: Career beginnings ===
Kyuhyun officially made his debut in 2006 as a new member of Super Junior (formerly Super Junior 05, the first generation of SM Entertainment's 12-member rotational boy band).

Kyuhyun made his first appearance as a part-time model of Super Junior in a news broadcast on May 23, where the group introduced their new single, U. He debuted a few days later on May 27 at SBS's I-Concert with "U", which was also the group's first comeback performance as a permanent group. The CD single "U" was released on June 7 and remained the group's most successful single until the release of "Sorry, Sorry" in 2009.

Shortly after his debut, Kyuhyun along with members Yesung and Ryeowook formed Super Junior's first sub-group, Super Junior-K.R.Y. The trio debuted on November 5 on KBS's weekly music program Music Bank. Kyuhyun subsequently released a solo track titled "Smile" for The tvN drama Hyena.

In 2008, Kyuhyun joined Super Junior Chinese sub-group Super Junior-M. The group debuted in China at the 8th Annual Music Chart Awards with the release of their first music video, "U" on April 8. The debut was followed by the release of the group's studio album, Me, in selected provinces throughout China and Taiwan. Kyuhyun also collaborated with the Grace in early 2008 to perform "Just For One Day" (하루만) for The Grace's first album Hanbeon Deo, OK?. Later that year, Kyuhyun, alongside member Ryeowook, featured in the song "Wish" (소원) in labelmate TVXQ's repackaged edition of Mirotic.

In 2009, Kyuhyun sang the remake of Yoo Young-suk's "7 Years of Love" (7년간의 사랑) for Yoo's 20th-anniversary tribute album. Kyuhyun first performed the song on the television program You Hee-yeol's Sketchbook. On June 30, the song was released as a digital single as well as on Yoo's tribute album, with all proceeds donated to UNICEF. Following the success of his solo track, Kyuhyun alongside bandmate Donghae and actress Han Ji-min appeared in the music video "Happy Bubble", a commercial theme song for facial wash product Happy Bath on August 20.

=== 2010–2013: Original soundtrack, S.M. The Ballad, Musical roles and Television roles ===
On January 6, 2010, Kyuhyun released his solo track "Listen To You" for the Korean drama Pasta. The song peaked at number one on real-time music portal charts. On August 5, Kyuhyun released his third solo song "Hope, a dream that never sleeps" (희망은 잠들지 않는 꿈) for the television drama Baker King, Kim Tak Goo.

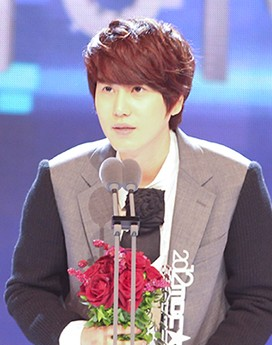
Cho Kyuhyun at the MBC Entertainment Awards, December 29, 2012

In November, Kyuhyun along with label mates TRAX's Jay, SHINee's Jonghyun, and newly debuted singer Jino (now a member of Pentagon) formed the project group SM The Ballad. The group was described as SM Entertainment's vocal unit group, but the original members would only promote that winter together. The group released their debut album, Miss You on November 29 and debuted on the music program Inkigayo the day before. The group remained inactive until 2014, when Kyuhyun along with TRAX's Jay and Jino left S.M.The Ballad, leaving Jonghyun as the only original member in the group.

From December 15, 2010, to mid-January 2011, Kyuhyun rotated as D'Artagnan with TRAX's Jay in The Three Musketeers at Chungmu Art Hall in Seoul, where the singers co-starred with Yoo Jun-sang, Im Ki-jun, Kim Mu-yul and Dana Hong. His performances as D'Artagnan placed him first in an online poll for the Musical Rising Star Award at the 2010 Golden Ticket Awards.

In 2011, Kyuhyun contributed to group mate Siwon's drama Poseidon with the track "The Way to Break Up". The single was composed by Yoon Jong-shin and was also included in Yoon's monthly project album. Kyuhyun sang "Late Autumn" for Yoon's November monthly project later that year. He also appeared on KBS's music competition program Immortal Songs 2, replacing group mate Yesung on the show. Kyuhyun went on to win two rounds.

Kyuhyun was one of four fixed MCs on Super Junior's show Foresight, and in September he replaced fellow member Heechul as an MC on MBC's Radio Star. He later appeared on We Got Married as part of Fighting Junior, supporting fellow member Leeteuk and his on-screen wife actress Kang So-ra.

In 2012, Kyuhyun was cast as Frank Abagnale Jr., rotating with Um Ki-joon, Kim Jeong-hoon, Park Gwang-hyun and Key of SHINee in the Korean production of the Broadway musical Catch Me If You Can. The musical ran from March 28 to June 10 at the Blue Square Samsung Card Hall in Hannam-dong, Seoul.

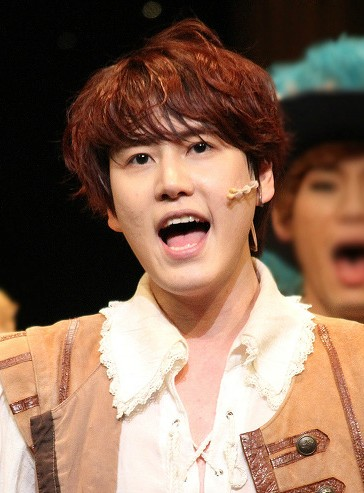
Kyuhyun in "The Three Musketeers", April 7, 2013

From December 2012 to February 2013, Kyuhyun was again cast as Frank Abagnale Jr. for the re-run of Catch Me If You Can. From March 2013 to April 2013, he was cast as D'Artagnan for the re-run of The Three Musketeers.

In May 2013, it was announced that Kyuhyun would replace labelmate SHINee's Minho as the new MC of KBS 2TV's Mamma Mia. Later in June, Kyuhyun featured in labelmate Henry's debut solo song "Trap" alongside SHINee's Taemin.

In August, Kyuhyun graduated from Kyunghee University's postmodern music department with a bachelor's degree. He enrolled for his master's the following month. News sources reported the graduations of Kyuhyun and classmate Kim Yeon-ji as unusual examples of entertainment stars taking their academic work seriously, to which Kyuhyun remarked, "I worked hard to get into university, so I was very attached".

=== 2014–2015: Solo debut with At Gwanghwamun and Fall, Once Again ===
From January 18 to February 23, 2014, Kyuhyun starred in the musical adaptation of MBC's Moon Embracing the Sun at the Seoul Arts Center, alongside Girls' Generation's Seohyun.

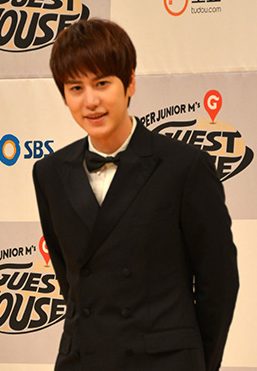
Kyuhyun in June 2014

In May, it was announced that Kyuhyun would star in the musical Singin' In The Rain as Don Lockwood, opposite Girls' Generation's Sunny. The musical was produced by SM C&C, a subsidiary of S.M. Entertainment, and ran from June 5 to 22 at Chungmu Art Hall in Seoul.

Later that month, Kyuhyun was cast in his fifth musical, The Days. He played the second lead character, Moo-yeong, a witty and free-spirited security guard at the Blue House. Kyuhyun rotated the character alongside actors Kim Seung-dae, Oh Jeong-hyuk, and Ji Chang-wook. The musical ran from October 21, 2014, to January 2015.

On November 13, 2014, Kyuhyun released his debut album, titled At Gwanghwamun, making him the first Super Junior member to debut alone. Kyuhyun made his first music show appearance on KBS2's Music Bank on November 14. Just 12 hours after the album's online release, the title track, "At Gwanghwamun", achieved an 'all-kill' by topping all nine digital Korean charts. All of the songs on his album eventually climbed to the top 10 on most music sites.

In December, it was announced that Kyuhyun would star as Prince Phillip for the musical Robin Hood. He rotated the role with Beast's Yoseob and actor Park Sung-hwan. The musical opened in January 2015 at the D-Cube Arts Center in Seoul.

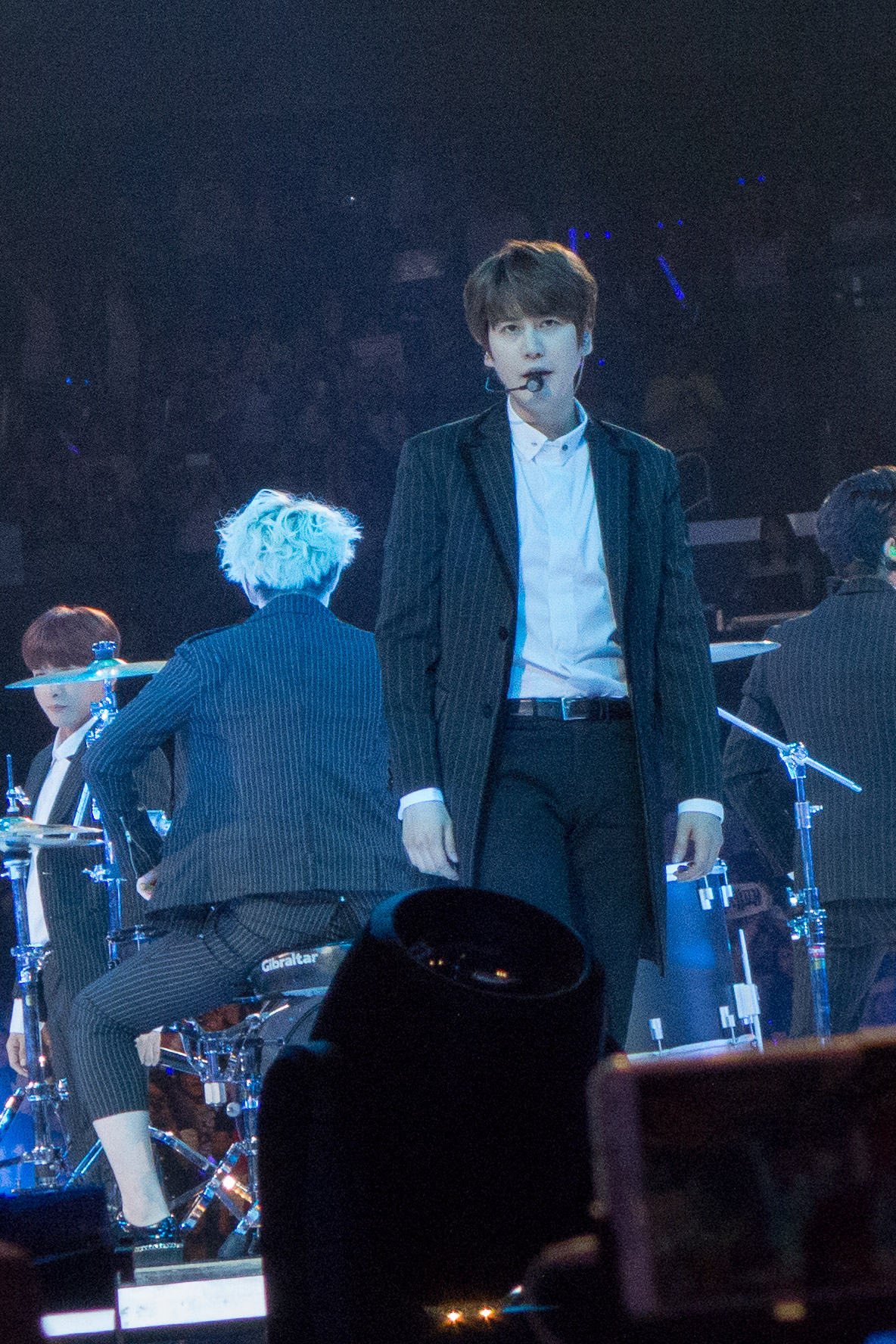
Kyuhyun performing at KCON 2015.

In early 2015, Kyuhyun was cast in news-based KBS reality show Fluttering India (두근두근 인도) alongside TVXQ's Changmin, Shinee's Minho, CNBLUE's Jonghyun, Infinite's Sungkyu and Exo's Suho. Filming took place in Mumbai throughout February and the first episode was released on April 10, 2015.

On March 25, it was announced that singer-songwriter Lee Moon-se chose Kyuhyun to be his duet partner in his new album, New Direction. The duo's duet track, "She is Coming" was released on April 7.

On October 14, 2015, Kyuhyun's second EP, Fall, Once Again with the title track "A Million Pieces, was released".

In November 2015, Kyuhyun held his first solo concert And it's Fall Again, as part of SM Entertainment's concert series The Agit at the SMTOWN Theatre in SMTOWN's Coex Artium. Kyuhyun held six concerts, and tickets sold out in 46 seconds. Later that month, he released his next single, "The Day We Felt The Distance".

From November 2015 to January 2016, Kyuhyun played the lead role in the 15th-anniversary production of the musical Werther. He rotated the role with actors Um Ki-joon and Cho Seung-woo. Kyuhyun also participated in the OST album of the musical.

=== 2016–2017: Japan promotions, Waiting, Still and military enlistment ===
From April 11 to June 5, 2016, Kyuhyun held his solo tour in Japan, titled Super Junior Kyuhyun Japan Tour 2016 ~Knick Knack~. He performed in several cities, including Fukuoka, Sapporo, Osaka, Hiroshima, Yokohama, Nagoya, and Tokyo. Following his tour, Kyuhyun also released his debut Japanese single titled "Celebration ~Bridge to You~", on May 25.

On August 22, SM Entertainment announced that Kyuhyun would take a break from his activities due to vocal cord nodules. He underwent surgeries and temporarily halted his activities, including his performance in an ongoing musical that he was cast in, Mozart, as well as two weeks of recording on Radio Star.

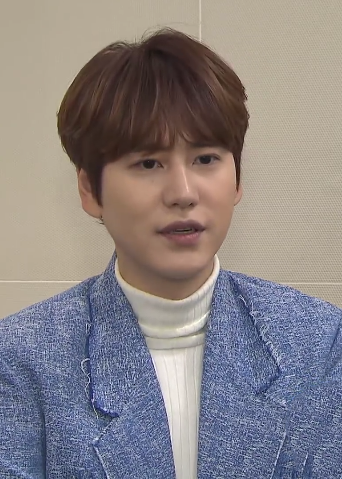
Kyuhyun in November 2016

In October 2016, it was announced that popular singer Sung Si-kyung would be a participating composer in Kyuhyun's upcoming album, which was scheduled to release within the year. Kyuhyun performed the new track at his concert Reminiscence of a novelist on October 29 to 30 at Ehwa Womans University and Busan from November 5 to 6 at Bexco Auditorium. His third EP, Waiting, Still, was released on November 10. The album includes the double title tracks, "Blah Blah" was produced by popular singer-songwriter Yoon Jong-shin and "Still" was produced by popular ballad singer Sung Si-kyung.

In December 2016, Kyuhyun confirmed he would release his first Japanese album One Voice on February 8, 2017 and held his second Japan tour, Super Junior-Kyuhyun Japan Tour 2017 ~One Voice~, from January 18 to March 5, 2017. One Voice reached number 1 on Oricon's daily chart, and it ranked number 1 on Oricon weekly album chart in less than a week. With this album, Kyuhyun became the first solo foreign male artist from a group to top the chart.

In May 2017, it was announced that Kyuhyun would release a single titled 'Goodbye for Now' on May 24, a day before his enlistment date.

=== 2019: Return from military, The Day We Meet Again, and King of Masked Singer ===
Following his discharge from his mandatory military service on May 7, 2019, Kyuhyun held a fan meeting, Meeting Again Today, on May 19 at the Peace Hall in Kyung Hee University. He declined to return as an MC of Radio Star; but returned as a cast member of New Journey to the West for its seventh season, and joined the second seasons of Salty Tour and Kang's Kitchen. He also participated in Super Junior's 9th Album Time_Slip.

On May 14, 2019, Kyuhyun released his first single since his discharge, "Time with You". He also released a new EP, The Day We Meet Again, featuring the lead single "Aewol-ri", on May 20, 2019. Since his discharge, he also started his own YouTube channel KYU TV.

Kyuhyun also competed in King of Mask Singer, first appearing in episode 211 (broadcast on July 14, 2019) as "Jinie". Kyuhyun obtained 5 consecutive wins as "Jinie", becoming the first male idol to win the title of "Mask King". Kyuhyun covered a variety of songs during the competition including Kim Dong-ryool's "Should I Say I Love You Again?", Park Hyo-shin's "Breath", Lee Hi's "Breath", Naul's "Memory of the Wind", Wanna One's "Energetic", Yoon Jong-shin ft. Jung-in's "Uphill Road" and Shinee Kim Jong-hyun's solo song "Y Si Fuera Ella".

On December 19, it was announced that Kyuhyun would return to the musical scene after four years since his last musical appearance. It was also his first musical appearance after being discharged from military service. He was cast in the musical "The Man Who Laughs", and was set to perform in January 2020.

=== 2020–2021: When We Were Us and Project: 季 ===
The song "All Day Long" was recorded by Kyuhyun as Part 3 of the OST for drama When The Weather is Fine. The song was released on March 16, 2020 and peaked at 142 in the Gaon Music Chart. The Super Junior member also recorded a remake version of the hit 1993 song "Confession Is Not Flashy" by Lee Seung Hwan for OST Part 4 of the popular tvN drama Hospital Playlist. The remake was released on April 3, 2020 and peaked at 8 on the Gaon Music Chart. Kyuhyun's remake of "Confession Is Not Flashy" was also nominated for the 30th Seoul Music Awards for Best OST.

In June 2020, Kyuhyun along with his fellow members of Super Junior K.R.Y released their first Korean EP since their debut in 2006 titled When We Were Us (EP) (푸르게 빛나던 우리의 계절). The album peaked at 1 on the Gaon Music Charts.

On July 23, 2020, Kyuhyun released the music video for his single "Dreaming" as the first part of his Project: 季 series. According to the concept of this project, Kyuhyun released a single for each season for a year with "Dreaming" being the single which represents Summer season.

On August 23, 2020, Toon Studio unveiled the OST "The Moment My Heart Flinched" recorded by Kyuhyun for the webtoon She Is My Type. The song peaked at 5 in the Gaon Music Chart.

The second single from Kyuhyun's Project: 季 series was released on October 8, 2020, and is titled as "Daystar". "Daystar" represents the Autumn season and the music video stars actor Yoo Yeon Seok.

On January 13, 2021, EMK Musical unveiled the cast teaser for the musical "Phantom" in which Kyuhyun has been cast in the titular role of "Phantom" alongside Park Eun-tae, Kai, and Jeon Dong-seok. "Phantom" is a musical based on Gaston Leroux's iconic 1909 novel "The Phantom of the Opera (Le Fantôme de l'Opéra)". Ticketing for the musical began on January 19, 2021, and is set to run from March 17, 2021, to June 27, 2021.

Kyuhyun returned with his new series 2021 Project: 季, starting with the first single "Moving On", released on January 26, 2021, representing the winter season. The music video stars actor Gong Myung and actress Chae Soo Bin.

The second single from the 2021 Project: 季 series, titled "Coffee", was released on April 13, 2021, representing the spring season.

The third single from the 2021 Project: 季 series, titled "Together", was released on July 5, 2021, representing the summer season.

On September 13, 2021, it was announced that Kyuhyun was cast to be in the musical "Frankenstein". He took up the role of "Victor Frankenstein", alongside Jeon Dong-seok and Min Woo-hyuk.

Kyuhyun released his fourth EP, Love Story (4 Season Project 季), featuring the lead single "Love Story", on January 25, 2022, to conclude the 2021 Project: 季 series.

=== 2022–2025: Soundtrack songs, departure from SM, new agency and new albums ===
The OST recorded by Kyuhyun for the drama Forecasting Love and Weather, titled "Promise You" was released on March 6, 2022. Kyuhyun also recorded an OST titled "Departure from a Country" for the drama Sh**ting Stars, which was released on May 21, 2022.

He participated in the release of Super Junior's eleventh album, The Road, in 2022. The album was released in three parts, which were The Road: Winter for Spring, The Road: Keep on Going and The Road: Celebration.

Kyuhyun appeared in the fifth episode of Hidden Singer Season 7 on September 16, 2022, as the singer of the episode. He was shockingly being eliminated in the second round, receiving 51 out of 100 votes from the audience.

On July 14, 2023, it was announced that Kyuhyun, along with his fellow group members Eunhyuk and Donghae, had decided not to renew their contracts with SM, but will continue group activities for Super Junior with SM. On August 7, Kyuhyun was announced to join Antenna as his new label.

On July 19, 2023, the official teaser for the musical "Ben-Hur" was released by EMK Musical, where Kyuhyun plays the lead role of Judah Ben-Hur, having been cast alongside Park Eun-tae and Shin Sung-rok. This news comes after an almost two year gap from his previous musical appearance. The musical premiered on September 2, 2023, and has its finale on November 19, 2023, at the LG Signature Hall at LG Art Centre Seoul. Musical Ben-Hur is based on the 1880 novel Ben-Hur: A Tale of the Christ by Lew Wallace, which tells the story of a hero, Judah Ben-Hur, who meets his childhood friend, Messala, leading to a series of events involving betrayal, slavery, revenge, compassion and forgiveness. During an appearance on SBS Power FM's "Cultwo Show" alongside Park Minsung and Choi Ji-hye, Kyuhyun revealed that he had injured his left foot during the musical.

On January 9, 2024, Kyuhyun released an extended play called Restart, marking his first release with Antenna.

Following his mini album, he released his first full album, Colors, in the same year, on 27 November.

On August 22, 2025, Kyuhyun began touring with the rest of Super Junior for their 20th Anniversary tour, "Super Show 10". The Asia tour is set to continue until early 2026, with its last tour stop in Saitama, Japan.

On September 19, 2025, an upcoming album was announced for a comeback slated for November 2025. A new EP or mini album, titled 'The Classic' was released on November 20, 2025. It included 5 new songs, with 'Like Our First Snow' as the title track. The music video was released at 6PM KST, featuring tripleS' Jiyeon and actors Chun Jongmin and Kim Namji. It showed the premise of a story where a young Kyuhyun, parted ways with a ballerina, his first love from high school, to debut as a singer.

=== 2026–present: Death Note: The Musical ===
On November 19, 2025, Kyuhyun was announced to be added to the cast of OD Company's Death Note: The Musical, a musical adaptation of the original anime series. He was cast as Light Yagami, with actor Kim Sung-cheol also cast as L. They will be officially added to the line-up schedule from January 27, 2026. The musical runs from October 14, 2025, to May 10, 2026 at D-cube Arts Center in Seoul.

== Artistry ==
=== Voice ===
Kyuhyun is a tenor, with a range spanning four octaves.

== Personal life ==
=== Religion ===
Kyuhyun is one of the six Super Junior members who are Christians.

=== Car accident ===
On the early morning of April 19, 2007, Kyuhyun along with Super Junior members Leeteuk, Shindong, Eunhyuk, and two managers were hospitalized due to a serious car accident while returning from a Super Junior Kiss the Radio show. The front tire reportedly burst, causing the car to hit a guard rail, spin twice, and flip over. Kyuhyun, who was sitting behind the driver's seat, suffered the most serious injuries including a fractured hip, broken ribs, and facial scratches and bruises. He subsequently developed pneumothorax from a broken rib piercing his lungs and remained in a coma for four days.

The doctor treating Kyuhyun at the time said that in order to repair Kyuhyun's pierced lungs he would have to pierce a hole into his neck, thus ending his career as a singer. Kyuhyun's father, who once vehemently opposed his son's career, was the first to immediately reject the operation, stating that Kyuhyun would rather die than not be able to sing. He pleaded that the doctor find another way to repair his son's lungs. In spite of this, doctors insisted that even with the surgery Kyuhyun "had about a 20 percent chance to live". After fierce debate between his parents and doctors, another surgeon named Dr. Wang Youngpil suggested an alternative operation that would instead make an incision in the ribs.

Kyuhyun spent six days in the ICU before he was transferred to a regular hospital room. After being moved, Kyuhyun no longer needed support from a respiratory machine, but he was not able to walk on his own until one month after the accident. He was discharged on July 5, 2007, after 78 days.

=== Vocal cord surgery ===
On August 23, 2016, Kyuhyun underwent vocal cord surgery to treat his vocal chord nodules. He subsequently took a break from all activities during recovery.

=== Military enlistment ===
On May 25, 2017, Kyuhyun began his mandatory military service. He received training at the Nonsan Army Training Center for four weeks before fulfilling his military duty as a social service worker. Kyuhyun is the last member of Super Junior to begin military service. Kyuhyun was discharged on May 7, 2019.

== Commercial endorsements ==
Together with Super Junior and Super Junior-M, Kyuhyun has endorsed various brands such as Pepsi, Yamaha, 12Plus, SPAO, Kyochon Chicken, LG phone, Tony Moly, Lotte Duty Free, and Bonrich. He was also the main spokesperson for Masita Seaweed from 2011 to 2016.

In 2013, Kyuhyun and label mates Yoona, Minho, Sulli, Seohyun, and Siwon were appointed as the main models for SK Telecom.

In 2016, Kyuhyun was chosen to be the representative of Samdasoo mineral water along with Girls' Generation's Taeyeon.

In 2022, Kyuhyun appeared in a commercial for Terra, a brand of Korean beer by HiteJinro. He appeared with Sunmi whom he was a judge with in the reality show Sing Again 2, and participating contestants Kim Ki-tae, Kim So-yeon, Yun Seong.

In 2024 and 2025, Kyuhyun became the Tourism Ambassador for Taiwan for two consecutive years. He filmed several short clips and appeared on posters advertising tourism for Taiwan.

== Discography ==
- One Voice (2017)
- Colors (2024)

== Filmography ==
=== Film ===
Year	Title	Role	Ref.
2010	Super Show 3 3D	Himself	
2012	I AM. – SM Town Live World Tour in Madison Square Garden	Himself	
2013	Super Show 4 3D	Himself	
2021	Musical Werther	Werther	
2021	Phantom: The Musical Live	Phantom	

=== Web series ===
Year	Title	Role	Ref.
2016	Bongsun, the Woman Who Dies if She Loves	Kim Joo-sung	

=== Television shows ===
Year	Title	Role	Note	Ref.
2011–2017	Radio Star	Host	Episodes 206–529	
2012	We Got Married	Cast member	Paired up with Lou Yixiao, Chinese version	
2013	Star Family Show Mamma Mia	Host		
2015	Fluttering India	Cast member	Episodes 1–5	
2015	King of Mask Singer	Contestant	as "Detective Cough" (Episode 29 & 30)	
2017, 2019–2020	New Journey to the West	Cast member	Seasons 2.5, 3, 4, 7–8	
2019	King of Mask Singer	Contestant	as "Genie" (Episodes 211–212, 214, 216, 218, 220 & 222)	
2019	Kang's Kitchen	Cast member	Seasons 2 and 3	
2019	RUN.WAV	Host		
2019	Fall in Love with Music	Host		
2019–2020	Salty Tour	Cast member	Season 2 (Episodes 79–121) and Season 2.5	
2020	Oh! My Part, You	Host		
2020	Home Cooking Live	Host		
2020–2021	Things That Make Me Groove	Host		
2020–2025	Sing Again	Judge	Season 1–4	
2021	Mystical Record Shop	Host		
2021	Tiki-taCAR	Host		
2021	Famous Singer	Host	Spin-off in Sing Again S1	
2021	Baek Jong-won's Four Seasons	Host	With Baek Jong-won	
2021	Drinking Guys	Host		
2021	Cooking - The Birth of a Cooking King	Contestant		
2022	Docuplex - One Year of Coup D'état, Myanmar Youth's Dream	Narrator	Documentary Democracy in Myanmar	
2022	Famous Singers	Host	Season 2	
2022	Goal-Striking Overnight	Cast Member		
2022	New Festa	Cast Member		
2022	Weekly Idol	Special MC		
2022	Things that Make Me Groove S2	Host	with Eun Ji-won and Song Min-ho	
2022–present	Han Moon-cheol's Black Box Review	Cast Member		
2022–present	Naked World History	Host		
2023	Walking Into the Fantastic	Host	with Park Na-rae	
2023	Peak Time	Judge	Lead judge	
2023	Phantom Singer	Judge	Season 4	
2023	Sing Again 3	Judge		
2024	Famous Singer 3	Host	Season 3 | Spin-off of Sing Again S3	
2024	Real or Reel	Host		
2024	Me Sing	Host	with Jung Jaehyung	
2025	The Devil's Plan 2	Contestant		
2025	Sing Again 4	Judge		
2025	Three Meals in Kenya	Cast Member	Spin-off of New Journey to the West	

=== Web shows ===
Year	Title	Role	Notes	Ref.
2019–2021	SJ Returns	Cast Member	Season 3–4	
2020–2021	MuSeezn	Host		
2021	Spring Camping	Cast Member		
2021	Mister Camper	Cast Member	with Lee Soo-geun	
2021–Present	Single's Inferno	Host	Season 1–Present	
2023	Nineteen to Twenty	Host	with Kim Ji-eun. Lee Su-hyun and Jeong Se-woon	
2023	Bro & Marble	Cast Member	with Lee Seung-gi, Yoo Yeon-seok, Lee Dong-hwi, Ji Seok-jin, Joshua and Hoshi	
2023	Knights of the Lamp	Cast Member	with Leeteuk, Donghae, Eunhyuk, Shindong and Ryeowook	

== Musical theatre ==
Year	Title	Role	Ref.
2010–2011, 2013	The Three Musketeers	D'Artagnan	
2012–2013	Catch Me If You Can	Frank Abagnale Jr.	
2014	Moon Embracing the Sun	King Leehwon	
2014	Singin' in the Rain	Don Lockwood	
2014	The Days	Moo-yeong	
2015	Robin Hood	Prince Phillip	
2015	Werther	Werther	
2016	Mozart!	Wolfgang Amadeus Mozart	
2020	The Man Who Laughs	Gwynplaine	
2020	Werther (20th anniversary)	Werther	
2021	Phantom	Erik	
2021	Frankenstein	Victor Frankenstein / Jacques	
2023	Ben-Hur	Judah Ben-Hur	
2024	Frankenstein	Victor Frankenstein / Jacques	^{[146]}
2025	The Man Who Laughs	Gwynplaine	
2026	Death Note	Light Yagami	

== Ambassadorship ==
- ACRC Public Relations Ambassador (2021)
- Taiwan Tourism Ambassador for the South Korean Market (2024 & 2025)

== Concert and tours ==
- And It's Fall Again (2015)
- Super Junior Kyuhyun Japan Tour 2016 ~Knick Knack~ (2016)
- Reminiscence of a novelist (2016)
- Super Junior Kyuhyun Japan Tour 2017 ~ONE VOICE~ (2017)
- 2024 Kyuhyun Asia Tour Restart (2024)
- Colors (2024–2025)

== Awards and nominations ==
Name of the award ceremony, year presented, nominee(s) of the award, award category, and the result of the nomination
Award ceremony	Year	Nominee/work	Category	Result	Ref.
Brand Customer Loyalty Awards	2021	Cho Kyuhyun	Best Male Variety Idol	Nominated	
Golden Disc Awards	2016	At Gwanghwamun	Disk Bonsang	Nominated	
Golden Disc Awards	2016	"At Gwanghwamun"	Digital Bonsang	Won	
Golden Ticket Awards	2011	The Three Muskeeters Musical	Musical Rising Star	Won	
Huading Awards	2016	Cho Kyuhyun	Global Best Singer	Won	
MBC Entertainment Awards	2011	Radio Star	Special Award in MC category	Won	
MBC Entertainment Awards	2012	Radio Star	Best Newcomer Award	Won	
MBC Entertainment Awards	2012	Radio Star	Friendship Award (shared with Radio Star members)	Won	
MBC Entertainment Awards	2014	Radio Star	Excellence Award in Music/Talk Show	Won	
MBC Entertainment Awards	2015	Radio Star	PD's Award (shared with Radio Star members)	Won	
MBC Entertainment Awards	2016	Radio Star	Excellence Award in Music/Talk Show (Male)	Nominated	
MBC Entertainment Awards	2017	Radio Star	Achievement Award (shared with Radio Star members)	Won	
Mnet Asian Music Awards	2015	Cho Kyuhyun	Artist of the Year	Nominated	
Mnet Asian Music Awards	2015	Cho Kyuhyun	Best Male Artist	Nominated	
Mnet Asian Music Awards	2015	"At Gwanghwamun"	Best Vocal Performance Male	Nominated	
Mnet Asian Music Awards	2015	"At Gwanghwamun"	Song of the Year	Nominated	
SBS MTV Best of the Best	2014	Cho Kyuhyun	Best Vocal Video	Won	
Seoul Music Awards	2015	At Gwanghwamun	Bonsang Award	Nominated	
Seoul Music Awards	2015	Cho Kyuhyun	High1/Mobile Popularity Award	Nominated	
Seoul Music Awards	2015	Cho Kyuhyun	Hallyu Special Award	Nominated	
Seoul Music Awards	2021	Cho Kyuhyun	Ballad Award	Nominated	
Seoul Music Awards	2021	"Confession Is Not Flashy"	OST Award	Nominated	
The Musical Awards	2013	The Three Muskeeters Musical	Popular Star Award	Won	
