= Super Junior videography =

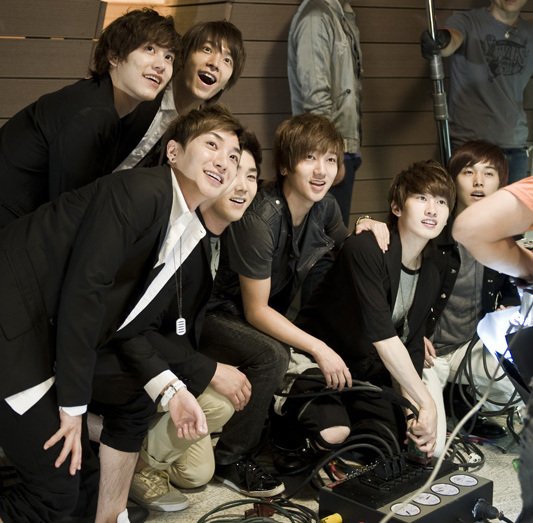
Super Junior filming for a television commercial in 2009.

South Korean boyband Super Junior had appeared in 83 music videos, most of which were in starring roles. Some of their music video has received recognition from critics and awarding bodies. The music video for "U", released in 2006, won the Popular Music Video Award at the 2006 edition of Golden Disc Awards. In 2009, they released the music video for "Sorry, Sorry" in support of their third album, Sorry, Sorry. The music video which features the song's dance routine was an instant hit in South Korea and skyrocketed their popularity in Asia. In 2020, it was listed as one of Globe Telecom's Iconic K-Pop Music Video. "Mr. Simple" music video, released in 2011 to support the album of the same name, won the 2011 Mashable Awards in the Viral Video of the Year category, won the 2012 Myx Music Awards's Favourite K-Pop Video, and was the recipient of the YouTube K-Pop Awards in the Most Viewed Video of The Year category. "Sexy, Free & Single" won three accolades; the 2013 Myx Music Awards's Favourite K-Pop Video, the Singapore's e-Awards in the Most Popular Music Video in K-pop category, and Favorite Asian Music Video in You2Play Awards. In 2018, music video for "Black Suit" won the International Video of the Year, also in the Myx Music Awards.

They had released eighteen video albums, and featured in further nine video albums as guest artist. Super Junior World Tour Super Show 4 Live in Japan was their best selling release in Japan, reaching number one in both Oricon DVD and Blu-Ray charts, selling more than 50,000 copies altogether in 2012.

== Music videos ==
=== 2000s ===
List of music videos released between the year 2000 until 2009
Title	Year	Other performer(s) credited	Director(s) and studio(s)	Description	Ref.
"Twins (Knock Out)"	2005	None	Chun Hyuk-jin	The music video shows Super Junior dances to the song in multiple rooms. It ends with the band members walking side by side to the camera while the building behind them is engulfed in fire.	
"Show Me Your Love"	2005	TVXQ	Chun Hyuk-jin	When Super Junior was feeling tired after a winter photoshoot with TVXQ, TVXQ brings up their spirit by singing the song, saying that TVXQ now has a new family member, Super Junior. The two groups sing together under the snow, in chapels, on ships, and other places that are surrounded by Christmas spirits.	
"Miracle"	2006	None	Chun Hyuk-jin	It shows Super Junior practicing the song's choreography in a dance studio, before boarding a bus to a music show filming set. They went on to perform the song in front of live audiences.	
"U"	2006	None	Chun Hyuk-jin	A young woman, played by Yoona of Girls' Generation, watches Super Junior dance to the song on multiple screens. It also marks the first appearance of Kyuhyun in Super Junior's music video since his addition to the group.	
"Taeyang-eun Gadeuki (Red Sun)" (Note: Korean: 태양은 가득히, lit. 'The sun is full')	2006	SMTown	Do!Dream	The artists are shown to be on a CGI-generated island called SM Town. As they sing, individual wanted posters bearing their names and pictures were shown.	
"Dancing Out"	2006	None	Do!Dream	The band members are walking around Kuala Lumpur and Putrajaya, Malaysia in the music video. The music video featured multiple landmarks including the Petronas Twin Towers, Perdana Putra and Putra Mosque.	
"Worldcup Song" (Note: Also known as 꼬레아리랑; KoreArirang)	2006	Clon, Lee Chae-yeon, SG Wannabe, Lee Seung-gi, Koyote, Jewelry, The Jadu, Boom, NRG, Noh Hong-chul and Lee Jung	Unknown	Originally sung by Clon and was released as a track in their album Funky Together (1999), it was covered by various artists in 2006 including Super Junior to cheer for the South Korea national football team at the 2006 FIFA World Cup. In the music video, the artists who are wearing the national team's jerseys are depicted in monochrome tone and sang in front of red coloured background.	
"Snow Dream"	2006	SM Town	Chun Hyuk-jin	SM Town artists including Super Junior are singing in multiple sets in Christmas-themed decoration while snows are falling	
"Wonder Boy"	2007	None	Lee Kwon	Soundtrack for the film Attack on the Pin-Up Boys. The music video portrays Super Junior and the other cast members dancing at a school field. At the end of the video, the school panda mascot took off his costume, revealing his identity as Leeteuk. (Note: Leeteuk was involved in a traffic accident prior to the film's shooting and was hospitalised. The face reveal was the only scene he filmed for the movie.)	
"Haengbok"	2007	None	Do!Dream	It shows the band members in multiple locations; the dressing room, gym and a clothing store. They are preparing for a free hug event, which they carry out in the middle of a street junction. A policeman who are calling for backups to control the crowd was pushed over by eager fans, but he later appears to be fine and receives hugs from the band members as well.	
"Don't Don"	2007	None	Lee Sang-gyu	The music video depicts Super Junior dancing to the song in an abandon building. Henry Lau appears as a violinist in the video, ahead of his debut in the band's subunit Super Junior-M.	
"Marry U"	2007	None	Heebok Lee	It portrays a woman, played by Yoona, who is going through her daily life while thinking about a marriage proposal. At the end of the video, she nods to the camera while wearing an engagement ring, indicating that she had accepted the marriage proposal. The video relies on CGI and was shot with Super Junior singing in front of a green screen.	
"Sarang Hanajyo"	2007	SM Town	Chun Hyuk-jin	SM Town artists were shown singing in the studios, interspersed with clips of people supporting each other while facing hardships in everyday life	
"One Love"	2008	None		The video featured clips of Super Junior's performance from their first headlining concert tour, Super Show.	
"Son-eul Jabayo" (Note: Korean: 손을 잡아요, lit. 'Hold your hand')	2008	Girls' Generation, SS501, Jewelry, Brown Eyed Girls, Lee Hyun and T.G.U.S.	Unknown	Clips of various artists recording the song in a studio	
"Sorry, Sorry"	2009	None	Jang Jae-hyuk	The music video is filmed in black and white, showcasing Super Junior singing and dancing to the song in several settings.	
"Sorry, Sorry" (Dance ver.)	2009	None	Jang Jae-hyuk	Alternative music video to the song, featuring the band members performing the song's choreography in one continuous shot	
"It's You"	2009	None	Cho Soo-hyun	The music video alternates between three scenes; Super Junior singing while sitting on stools, the band performing the song's choreography, and the band walking around the streets while in states of heartbreaks	
"It's You" (Drama ver.)	2009	None	Cho Soo-hyun	A woman returns a ring to Kibum, signalling their break up. Super Junior members are then seen working through their break ups in different ways.	
"Sorry, Sorry - Answer"	2009	None	Chun Hyuk-jin	Yesung, Kyuhyun and Ryeowook are singing the song while other band members are doing various works while waiting for something. When the time comes, they meet up and have a drink together, dressed up in formal suits. The music video is in black and white.	
"S.E.O.U.L."	2009	Girls' Generation	Unknown	Members of Super Junior and Girls' Generation acted as Seoulite who confessed their feelings towards their love interests.	

=== 2010s ===
List of music videos released between the year 2010 until 2019
Title	Year	Other performer(s) credited	Director(s) and studio(s)	Description	Ref.
"Bonamana"	2010	None	Jang Jae-hyuk	It shows the band members dancing to the song choreography, interspersed with clips of them singing against a wall in the dark with only a single lamp bulb lighting the area. The music video surpassed 100 million views on YouTube in June 2018.	
"Victory Korea"	2010	None	Community DoDream	Members of Super Junior in Red Devil's t-shirt lead a group of fans marching the street while cheering for South Korea national football team. It is shortlisted as the best eleven FIFA World Cup inspired song on ESPN.	
"No Other"	2010	None		The band members acted as college students who confessed their feelings towards their love interests.	
"Gangsimjang (Strong Heart)"	2010	None		In the video, Leeteuk, Shindong and Eunhyuk sit down in a living room to watch Strong Heart (2009–2013). (Note: The three of them are regular cast of the show.) Instead, they saw themselves and Donghae singing and dancing to the song on screen.	
"Angel"	2010	None	Park Myeong-cheon	Super Junior does not appear in the music video but their vocals are still heard. The video featured scenes from the web drama Haru.	
"Bijin (Bonamana)" (Note: Japanese: 美人, lit. 'Beauty')	2011	None	Hoshi Yasuyuki	Japanese version of "Bonamana". The video featured live performance from the Japanese leg of their concert tour Super Show 3.	
"Mr. Simple"	2011	None	Hong Won-ki (Zanybros)	Super Junior who are wearing colourful outifts perform the song's choreography on a disco dance floor. The music video reached 100 million views milestone on YouTube in November 2015, the band's first.	
"Superman"	2011	None		The music video consisted of clips from various Super Junior's live performances, Mr. Simple album jacket shooting, and "Mr. Simple" music video filming.	
"A-Cha"	2011	None	Hong Won-ki (Zanybros)	Super Junior sing and dance to the song in several places, primarily in two futuristic settings; one with bright background and another with dark background.	
"A-Cha" (Dance Ver. #1)	2011	None	Hong Won-ki (Zanybros)	The video features close-up shots of the band members as they dance to the song.	
"A-Cha" (Dance Ver. #2)	2011	None	Hong Won-ki (Zanybros)	The video showcases the band performing the song's full choreography. It was filmed using long take technique.	
"Mr. Simple"	2011	None	Hong Won-ki (Zanybros)	A music video for Japanese version of the song, it features the same visual as its Korean counterpart.	
"Santa U Are The One"	2011	Henry and Zhou Mi		The video showcases behind-the-scene clips from 2011 SM Town Winter – The Warmest Gift album jacket shooting, which features members of SM Town, and scenes of Super Junior members in the recording studio.	
"Mr. Simple" (LG ver.)	2012	None		Produced by LG electronics, the video features Super Junior dancing to the song primarily in front of a red and grey wall, which is the colour of the brand's logo. It was released in limited edition CDs.	
"Dear My Family"	2012	SMTown		The single is used as the soundtrack for the documentary film I Am starring SMTown. The music video consisted of clips from the film, which covers the background story of their performance at Madison Square Garden during the SM Town Live '10 World Tour.	
"Opera"	2012	None	Zanybros	The band sing and dance in a large mansion while wearing masquerade masks	
"Opera" (Dance version)	2012	None	Zanybros	Alternate music video for the song, where Super Junior performed the song's choreography. It was released on the DVD version of the single.	
"Sexy, Free & Single"	2012	None	Hong Won-ki (Zanybros)	Super Junior performed the song's choreography in the middle of a road junction, a greyscale room and a white toned room. It also features the band members singing while standing in the middle of thin structures that are jutting out of the ground.	
"Spy"	2012	None	Hong Won-ki (Zanybros)	The music video showcases the band members singing and dancing while wearing tuxedo, and features silhouette of a woman. It contains elements from the James Bond franchise.	
"Spy" (Dance ver.)	2012	None	Hong Won-ki (Zanybros)	Super Junior perform the song's full choreography while wearing black shirts and trousers, paired with white suit jackets and bowtie.	
"Sexy, Free & Single"	2012	None	Hong Won-ki (Zanybros)	A music video for Japanese version of the song, it features the same visual as its Korean counterpart.	
"Way" (Super Show 4 in Tokyo ver.)	2012	None	Tomoko Matsuda (D:Complex)	The video showcases the live recording from the band's performance at the Japanese leg of their world tour Super Show 4. It was released as a bonus video on "Sexy, Free & Single" Japanese single.	
"You're So Beautiful"	2013	Choi Ji-woo, Kim Hyun-joong, Jang Keun-suk, Lin Chi-ling, Song Seung-heon, 2PM and Supernova		The artists featured in the video act in different roles and in many places throughout the video. Super Junior act as tourists on a luxury cruise ship. It is a promotional music video for Lotte Duty Free.	
"Hero"	2013	None	Jae Hyuk Jang	The music video shows the band members sitting on a rooftop at night. During the day, a scaffolding with large letters spelling the word Hero attached to it is also shown to be on the rooftop. The video also shows scenes of the band performing the song's choreography, primarily in a golden coloured room equipped with stage lighting.	
"Blue World"	2013	None	Young Son	Super Junior are seen dancing in a dark room before it turns to blue during the chorus. The video eventually shows that the change originated from the band members' power.	
"Mamacita"	2014	None	Hong Won-ki (Zanybros)	The music video is set in a fictional cowboy town, where a criminal had escaped from detention. He and his associates then steal a crown jewel, before ended up being caught by the town sheriff.	
"Mamacita" (Drama ver.)	2014	None	Hong Won-ki (Zanybros)	A longer version of "Mamacita" music video which focuses more on the storyline than the dance choreography.	
"This Is Love"	2014	None	Hong Won-ki (Zanybros)	The band walks around in a circular room separated by several sections. The video is in black-and-white with only red tint being highlighted. The video is shot using one take technique.	
"Evanesce"	2014	None	Hong Won-ki (Zanybros)	A continuation from "This Is Love" video, the visual saw that the set from aforementioned video has been trashed.	
"Mamacita -Ayaya-"	2014	None	Jung Young Park, Young Son, Sung Jim Jeon, Won Ki Hong (Zanybros)	A music video for Japanese version of "Mamacita", it features the same visual as its Korean counterpart.	
"Mamacita -Ayaya-" (from Super Junior World Tour Super Show6 in Japan)	2015	None			
"Sorry, Sorry" (from Super Junior World Tour Super Show6 in Japan)	2015	None			
"Devil"	2015	None	Hong Won-ki (Zanybros)	In the music video, Super Junior members are seduced by the devil who appears as a woman. When they finally realised they had been lied to, they congregate to defeat her but she managed to blow up their headquarters. However, they are able to escape unharmed.	
"Devil" (Performance video)	2015	None		Filmed in a studio, the video showcased the band performing "Devil" choreography.	
"Magic"	2015	None	Won Ki Hong (Zanybros)	The band members show-off their magic tricks to compete for a woman's affection, played by Choi Gyu-ri.	
"Devil"	2016	None	Kenta Tanoue	A promotional video for Super Junior's Japanese double A-side single "Devil/Magic", the video featured footage from their headlining performance at the 2015 A-Nation stadium festival.	
"One More Chance"	2017	None	Seong Won-mo, Park Sang-woo (Digipedi)	Super Junior members are shown trapped in rooms filled with objects symbolising their personal struggles. Halfway through the video, Donghae and Yesung managed to escape from their respective rooms, and they run along a bridge crossing the Han River, seemingly looking for something. The video ends with Donghae approaching a girl at a beach, signaling that he still had a chance to return to her.	
"Black Suit"	2017	None	Shin Jae-yong (Rigend Film)	The music video portrays the band members planning and conducting a heist in an auction for a set of black suit by disguising as key staffs and bidders.	
"One More Chance"	2017	None	Shindong	Super Junior is standing around a filming set while wearing winter jackets. The video is recorded after the band sold out winter jackets at CJ O Shopping home shopping channel, as part of Play album promotion.	
"Dear My Family" (Live Concert Ver.)	2017	SM Town		Using footage from SM Town Live Tour V in Japan concert tour, the music video is also released as a tribute to Jonghyun who died in December 2017.	
"Super Duper"	2018	None		An animated video showing caricatures of Super Junior members as they dance to the song.	
"Lo Siento"	2018	Leslie Grace, Play-N-Skillz	Lee Gi-baek (Tiger-Cave)	A man reminisces about a woman that he previously met and spend a night together with before they parted way. Super Junior members take turns acting as the main character in the video.	
"Animals"	2018	None	Unknown	Described as a visual pack video, it is an animated video which portrays the band members as their zodiac animals.	
"One More Time (Otra Vez)"	2018	Reik	Darren Craig, Jeremy Sullivan, Hong Won-ki (Zanybros)	Super Junior and Reik are shown meeting up in a hotel before they sing together. The music video also portrays the symbolism of broken heart such as pricking one's finger on a rose thorn and broken glass.	
"One More Time (Otra Vez)"	2018	Reik	Darren Craig, Hong Won-ki (Zanybros)	An alternate music video featuring Japanese version of the song.	
"Ahora Te Puedes Marchar"	2019	None	Unknown	A parody of Luis Miguel's music video released in 1980. It was released as a special video preceding the band's encore tour Super Show 7S. Members of Super Junior take turns playing the role of Miguel in the music video.	
"Show"	2019	None		The music video shows clips from Super Junior's concert tour, Super Show 7 and its encore, Super Show 7S.	
"Somebody New"	2019	None		A candid music video, compiling clips from the band's training sessions at the dance studio leading up to the release of Time Slip.	
"The Crown"	2019	None		A lyrics video composed of clips from the photo shoot of the album jackets and photobooks for Time Slip.	
"I Think I"	2019	None	Lee Gi-baek (Tiger-Cave)	Super Junior walk around and explore an empty subway station with an exit leading to a 14th Street.	
"Super Clap"	2019	None	Kim Zi-yong (Fantazylab)	It portrays the band members in different roles; office workers, party goers, tennis players and arcade players. They eventually gather at a hangar and board an aeroplane to go to Carnegie Hall, leaving all their real life problems behind them.	
"Come a Little Closer"	2019	None	Shindong	Soundtrack for the YouTube Original series Analog Trip starring members of Super Junior and TVXQ. The music video portrays clips from the series.	

=== 2020s ===
List of music videos released from the year 2020 onwards
Title	Year	Other performer(s) credited	Director(s) and studio(s)	Description	Ref.
"I Think I (Japanese ver.)"	2020	None	Hong Won-ki (Zanybros)	Members of Super Junior are shown thinking about their love interests	
"2YA2YAO!"	2020	None	Hong Won-ki (Zanybros)	The music video features the band members standing alone in different rooms, interspersed with clips of them performing the song's choreography in a large room.	
"2YA2YAO!" (Performance ver.)	2020	None	Hong Won-ki (Zanybros)	The video showcases the band performing the song's choreography in three settings, in front of a red, a blue and a black coloured backdrops.	
"The Melody"	2020	None	Park Geon-su, Cha Hyun-ah (Panda Ground)	Super Junior are singing in a room containing minimal furniture while reminiscing about their 15 years journey as a group. The scenes are interspersed with footages from their concerts and activities throughout the years.	
"Raining Spell for Love (Remake ver.)"	2020	None	Han Tae-ho, Hwang Gyo-seong (Thoyarino)	Live performance clip showing Super Junior singing the song in a cafe	
"Burn The Floor"	2020	None	Kim Ja-kyoung (Flexible Pictures)	A performance video, the visual featured the band members dancing to the song in a dark setting before it is revealed that they are in a dance studio. The video was filmed with minimal crew due to COVID-19 pandemic social gathering rules.	
"Tell Me Baby"	2020	None	Lee Sang-hwa (Studio Sleeper)	A Christmas theme animated film, the video featured the band members as santa helpers or elves, who then go to a fan's house to leave presents for her under the Christmas tree.	
"Hope"	2021	SM Town	Donghyeok Seo (Flipevil)	Clips of Super Junior, alongside other members of SM Town singing the song. The video is released during the online concert SM Town Live Culture Humanity	
"Star"	2021	None		A lyrics video, the visual showcases behind-the-scene clips from the album jacket shooting of Star	
"House Party"	2021	None	Kim Ja-kyoung (Flexible Pictures)	Donghae was feeling trapped and bored at home as he was unable to socialise with his friend due to the COVID-19 pandemic. As he watches the television, he starts imagining his friends giving him encouragement to follow social distancing rules. He fell asleep and dreamt of being sniped by Eunhyuk as he tried to leave the house. When he wakes up, he realises that the pandemic is over and he is able to have his friends come over for his house party.	
"House Party" (House ver.)	2021	None	Shindong	The band members, dressed in pyjamas, dance to the song's choreography in an apartment that is hosting someone's 60th birthday party.	
"House Party" (Alone ver.)	2021	None	Shindong	Solo shots of the band member singing and dancing around a sofa in the same setting as shown in the House version of the music video	
"Hope from Kwangya"	2022	SM Town	Donghyeok Seo (Flipevil)	Members of SM Town including Super Junior are waiting to board the fictional train SMCU Express. The music video is released after the SM Town Live 2022: SMCU Express at Kwangya online concert.	
"Dear My Family"	2022	Yoo Young-jin		The music video compiles footages of SM Town artists, including Super Junior's various song recording sessions, dance practices, music video filmings and other activities, culminating with footages from their performances on SM Town Live concerts.	
"Callin'" (Winter for Spring ver.)	2022	None	Choi Young-ji (Pinklabel Visual)	Semi-animated music video describing the love story of a man by using the transition from winter to spring as a metaphor	
"Callin'" (Winter ver.)	2022	None	Choi Young-ji (Pinklabel Visual)	Alternate music video for "Callin'", without the animation sequence	
"Don't Wait"	2022	None	Choi Young-ji (Pinklabel Visual)	A group of greasers and dandies fall in love with the same woman. They enter a dance competition to win the right to confess their feelings to her. After winning the competition, Shindong approaches the woman, only to be surprised as she is a Leeteuk's look-alike.	
"Mango"	2022	None	Hong Won-ki (Zanybros)	Super Junior enter a building from its rooftop by using a key that was attached to a mango-shaped keychain. They pass the key to each other throughout the video before returning to the rooftop together.	
"Analogue Radio" (special video @ Super Show 9: Road)	2022	None		The video is first released as an interlude visual in Super Show 9: Road concert tour. It shows clips from the band's concert visuals filming, as well as behind-the-scenes shot from "Mango" and "Don't Wait" music videos.	
"Celebrate"	2022	None	Choi Young-ji (Pinklabel Visual)	The music video portrays the story of three couples; a pair of kids, a couple of young adult and a couple of elderly, who later gather together for Christmas dinner. Super Junior gather around and decorate a large Christmas tree at the end of the video.	
"Celebrate" (special video @ Super Show 9: Road in Manila)	2022	None		Clips of Super Junior's performance of the song from the Filipino stop of their world tour Super Show 9: Road	
"Hope from Kwangya" (SMCU Palace @ Kwangya ver.)	2023	SM Town	Flipevil	Members of SM Town including Super Junior are shown singing in a palace while wearing school uniforms. The music video is released after the SM Town Live 2023: SMCU Palace at Kwangya online concert.	
"Show Time"	2024	None	Hong MinHo (Studio Achilles)	Released to promote their tour Super Show Spin-Off: Halftime, the visual starts with showing members of L.S.S. being in a talk show set, D&E in a photo studio, and K.R.Y. in recording studios. When they receive alert notifications, the members gather to rehearse for the tour.	
"Express Mode"	2025	None	Lee Hyesu	Set in a futuristic airport, the band members separately received their flight tickets before travelling together in a warp drive.	

== Video albums ==
=== Concert tours ===
List of video albums as lead artist, with selected details, charts positions and sales
Title	Album details	Peak chart positions		Sales
Title	Album details	JPN		Sales
Title	Album details	DVD	Blu-ray	Sales
Super Junior 1st Premium Event in Japan	Released: September 24, 2008; Label: Rhythm Zone; Formats: DVD	41	—	
Super Junior 1st Premium Live in Japan	Released: January 6, 2010; Label: Rhythm Zone; Formats: DVD	24	—	
Super Junior 1st Concert DVD: Super Show	Released: August 2, 2010; Label: Taewon Entertainment; Formats: DVD	—	—	
Super Junior the 2nd Asia Tour: Super Show 2	Released: November 1, 2010; Label: SM Entertainment; Formats: DVD	—	—	
The 3rd Asia Tour–Super Show 3 in Japan	Released: November 16, 2011; Label: Avex Trax; Formats: DVD	5	—	JPN: 20,422
Super Junior - The 3rd Asia Tour: Super Show 3	Released: December 21, 2011; Label: SM Entertainment; Formats: DVD	—	—	
Super Junior World Tour Super Show 4 Live in Japan	Released: October 31, 2012; Label: Avex Trax; Formats: DVD, Blu-ray	1	1	JPN (DVD): 34,987; JPN (Blu-ray): 19,279
Super Junior Fanclub Event 2012 in Yokohama Akarenga	Released: March 20, 2013; Label: Avex Trax; Formats: DVD	–	–	
Super Junior World Tour: Super Show 4	Released: October 2, 2013; Label: SM Entertainment; Formats: DVD	—	—	
Super Junior World Tour Super Show 5 in Japan	Released: January 29, 2014; Label: Avex Trax; Formats: DVD, Blu-ray	3	3	JPN (DVD): 22,689; JPN (Blu-ray): 15,079
Super Junior World Tour in Seoul: Super Show 5	Released: December 8, 2014; Label: SM Entertainment; Formats: DVD	—	—	
Super Junior World Tour Super Show 6 in Japan	Released: March 11, 2015; Label: Avex Trax; Formats: DVD, Blu-ray	3	3	JPN (DVD): 13,009; JPN (Blu-ray): 9,363
Super Junior World Tour in Seoul: Super Show 6	Released: January 11, 2016; Label: SM Entertainment; Formats: DVD	—	—	
Super Junior Special Event Super Camp in Tokyo	Released: August 17, 2016; Label: Avex Trax; Formats: DVD	—	—	
Super Junior E.L.F-Japan Festival 2017: Super Sports Day	Released: February 21, 2018; Label: Avex Trax; Formats: DVD, Blu-ray	—	—	
Super Junior World Tour Super Show 7 in Japan	Released: March 6, 2019; Label: Avex Trax; Formats: DVD, Blu-ray	5	8	
Super Junior World Tour Super Show 7	Released: June 20, 2019; Label: SM Entertainment, Label SJ; Formats: DVD	—	—	
Super Junior World Tour Super Show 8: Infinite Time in Japan	Released: March 25, 2020; Label: Avex Trax; Formats: DVD, Blu-ray	5	10	JPN (DVD): 6,476
Super Junior World Tour Super Show 8: Infinite Time	Released: August 7, 2020; Label: SM Entertainment; Formats: Kit video	—	—	
E.L.F Japan 10th Anniversary: The Super Blue Party	Released: September 1, 2021; Label: Avex Trax; Formats: DVD, Blu-ray	—	—	
Super Junior Japan Special Event 2022: Return of the King	Released: October 12, 2022; Label: Avex Trax; Formats: DVD, Blu-ray	7	3	JPN (DVD): 1,272; JPN (Blu-ray): 6,132
Super Junior World Tour - Super Show 9: Road in Japan	Released: August 30, 2023; Label: Avex Trax; Formats: DVD, Blu-ray	5	7	JPN (DVD): 2,494; JPN (Blu-ray): 5,704
Super Junior Japan Special Event 2024: Blue World	Released: July 3, 2024; Label: Avex Trax; Formats: DVD, Blu-ray	9	8	JPN (DVD): 714; JPN (Blu-ray): 4,850
Super Show Anniversary Edition	Released: April 10, 2026; Label: SM Entertainment; Format: Online streaming	—	—	
"—" denotes releases that did not chart or were not released in that territory or format.

=== Featured releases ===
List of video albums as featured artist, with selected details, charts positions and sales
Title	Album details	Peak chart positions	
Title	Album details	JPN	
Title	Album details	DVD	Blu-ray
K-Pop Super Live in Saitama Super Arena	Released: May 4, 2007; Label: Taki Corporation; Format: DVD	—	—
K-Pop Dream Concert 2006	Released: May 25, 2011; Label: Interactive Media Mix; Format: DVD	160	—
K-Pop Dream Concert 2007	Released: May 25, 2011; Label: Interactive Media Mix; Format: DVD	73	—
K-Pop Dream Concert 2008	Released: June 29, 2011; Label: Interactive Media Mix; Format: DVD	22	—
K-Pop Dream Concert 2009	Released: June 29, 2011; Label: Interactive Media Mix; Format: DVD	20	—
K-Pop Dream Concert 2010 Spring	Released: July 27, 2011; Label: Interactive Media Mix; Format: DVD	30	—
K-Pop Dream Concert 2010 Autumn	Released: August 31, 2011; Label: Interactive Mix Media; Format: DVD	14	—
SM Town Live in Tokyo Special Edition	Released: February 22, 2012; Label: Avex Trax; Format: DVD	3	—
a-nation 2012 stadium fes.	Released: March 13, 2013; Label: Avex Trax; Format: DVD, Blu-ray	69	61
"—" denotes releases that did not chart or were not released in that territory or format.

== Filmography ==
=== Leading role ===
List of home medias of films and television shows with selected details, and charts positions
Title	Details	Peak chart positions		Sales
Title	Details	JPN		Sales
Title	Details	DVD	Blu-ray	Sales
Attack on the Pin-Up Boys	Released: September 20, 2007; Re-released: September 25, 2013; Label: SM Pictures, Avex Entertainment; Format: DVD, Blu-ray	54	160	KOR: 14,000
Super Junior's Miracle Box 1	Released: August 6, 2010; Label: KR Content Group; Format: DVD	159	—	
Super Junior's Miracle Box 2	Released: October 8, 2010; Label: KR Content Group; Format: DVD	162	—	
All About Super Junior 'Treasure Within Us'	Released: July 28, 2014; Label: SM Entertainment, SBS Viacom; Format: DVD	—	—	
Super Junior Leeteuk Ryeowook The Friends in Switzerland (Set 1 and 2)	Released: December 21, 2016; Label: TBS Dignet; Format: DVD	—	—	
Super Junior Returns	Released: December 21, 2018; Label: Avex Pictures; Format: DVD	22	—	
Super TV	Released: December 6, 2019; Label: Avex Pictures; Format: DVD	19	—	
SJ Returns 2: E.L.F's Dining Table	Released: July 17, 2020; Label: Avex Pictures; Format: DVD	10	—	JPN: 1,481
Super TV2	Released: February 26, 2021; Label: Stream Media Corporation; Format: DVD	10	—	JPN: 1,098
Super Junior Returns 3	Released: May 27, 2022; Label: Stream Media Corporation; Format: DVD	11	—	JPN: 1,444
"—" denotes releases that did not chart or were not released in that territory or format.

=== Featured role ===
List of home medias of films and television shows with selected details, and charts positions
Title	Details	Peak chart positions		Sales
Title	Details	JPN		Sales
Title	Details	DVD	Blu-ray	Sales
I Am - SM Town Live World Tour in Madison Square Garden	Released: October 3, 2012; Label: Avex Entertainment; Format: DVD, Blu-ray	1	2	JPN (DVD): 20,643; JPN (Blu-ray): 13,736
National Talk Show Annyeonghaseyo Male Idol Special	Released: February 8, 2013; Label: KBS Media; Format: DVD	52	—	
SM Town: The Stage	Released: January 20, 2016; Label: Avex Pictures; Format: DVD, Blu-ray	2	7	JPN (DVD): 10,368; JPN (Blu-ray): 11,010
"—" denotes releases that did not chart or were not released in that territory or format.

== Others ==
=== Other home medias ===
Other home medias with selected details
Title	Information
Super Junior Boys in City Kuala Lumpur	Released: September 4, 2006; Re-released: November 11, 2011; Label: SM Entertainment; Photobook released with a VCD; Reissued version was released with a DVD
Super Junior Boys in City Season2_Tokyo	Released: April 10, 2009; Label: SM Entertainment; Photobook released with a 64 minutes DVD
Super Junior Boys in City Season 3 Hong Kong	Released: May 14, 2010; Label: SM Entertainment; Photobook released with a 42 minutes DVD, narrated by Lee Sung-min and Cho Kyu-hyun
Super Junior Boys in City Season 4. Paris	Released: November 6, 2012; Label: SM Entertainment; Photobook released with a 28 minutes DVD
Super Junior's Experience Korea Vol.1	Released: August 20, 2013; Label: Woongjin Living House; Travel book released with accompanying AR Card
Super Junior's Experience Korea Vol.2	Released: August 20, 2013; Label: Woongjin Living House; Travel book released with accompanying AR Card
Super Junior / Memory in Hawaii - Aloha	Released: November 20, 2013; Label: SM Entertainment; Photobook released with a DVD
Super Junior / Memory in Hawaii - Mahalo	Released: December 11, 2013; Label: SM Entertainment; Photobook released with a DVD
Super Junior 2014 Season's Greetings	Released: December 14, 2013; Label: SM Entertainment; Calendar released with a region 3 DVD
Super Junior / Super Junior-M 2015 Season's Greetings	Released: January 7, 2015; Label: SM Entertainment; Calendar released with a region 3 DVD
Super Junior 2019 Season's Greetings	Released: December 8, 2018; Label: SM Entertainment; Calendar released with a 25 minutes DVD
Super Junior 2020 Season's Greetings	Released: December 18, 2019; Label: SM Entertainment; Calendar released with a 23 minutes DVD

== See also ==
- Subgroups
  - Super Junior-K.R.Y.#Videography
  - Super Junior-T#Videography
  - Super Junior-M#Videography
  - Super Junior-H#Videography
  - Super Junior-D&E discography#Music videos
