= Devil (Super Junior album) =

- Devil album cover

Studio album by Super Junior
- Released: July 16, 2015
- Recorded: 2015
- Studio: Doobdoob (Seoul); In Grid (Seoul); SM Big Shot (Seoul); SM Blue Cup (Seoul); SM Blue Ocean (Seoul); SM Yellow Tail (Seoul)
- Genre: K-pop; Dance; Rock
- Length: 36:36; 52:15 (repackaged)
- Language: Korean; Mandarin
- Label: SM; KT Music
- Producer: Lee Soo-man

Super Junior chronology
Mamacita (2014)	Devil (2015)	Play (2017)

Magic (Super Junior Special Album Part 2) front cover

Singles from Devil
- 1. "Devil" Released: July 16, 2015

Singles from Magic
- 1. "Magic" Released: September 16, 2015

Devil is the eighth Korean studio album (ninth overall) released by South Korean boy band Super Junior, released on July 16, 2015, by SM Entertainment. Released as a "special album", the album features nine members, marking the return of Yesung after his mandatory military service. This also marks the first album without Shindong and Sungmin, due to mandatory military service. Devil is the final release to feature Kangin before his hiatus and eventual departure from Super Junior in 2019.

== Background ==
After announcing that Super Junior returned with special album Devil on July 16 to celebrate the group's 10th anniversary, SM Entertainment released a comical trailer, heightening fans' anticipation for the comeback. The agency said, 'Friendship and trust among members along with gratitude toward fans' love are the foundation for the album.'

== Production and composition ==
Producing team the Stereotypes worked with SM's resident composer Kenzie on title song "Devil" for a trendy melody, effectively marking the departure of the group from its usual title track production with another resident SM songwriter-producer Yoo Young-jin, the one who writes for the group's title tracks since debut. The lyrics liken a man madly in love to the disposition of the devil. The performance for "Devil" was created by choreographer Tony Testa and SM's performance director BeatBurger. The Super Junior members also offered their own insights, leading to the creation of a fun, well-woven choreography with simple motions that showcase the group's laidback charms.

The album has a total of 10 tracks including the title song "Devil". The album involves many other singers for collaboration songs such as Lee Seung Hwan, and Kim Yoon Ah, Epitone Project and Kang Jun-Woo. Member Lee Donghae participated in writing lyrics and composing for the album. The tracks are partly classified by the group's subunits, which include Super Junior-K.R.Y., Super Junior-T, Super Junior-M and Super Junior-D&E.

== Promotion ==
=== Release ===
Super Junior held its press conference to commemorate its special album Devil release at SMTOWN COEX Artium in Samsung-dong, Seoul on July 15, 2015.

=== Live performances ===
The group made their comeback performance on the Korean music show M! Countdown with the songs "Devil" and "Don't Wake Me Up" on July 16, 2015, and kept promotions going on Music Bank, Music Core and Inkigayo. Super Junior first showcased its song during its encore concert Super Show 6 in Seoul, over two days from July 11 to 12. Super Junior performed 4 songs from the album, including the title song "Devil", "We Can", "Don't Wake Me Up" and "Alright".

== Awards and nominations ==
Year	Award	Category	Result	Ref.
2015	Mnet Asian Music Awards	Album of the Year	Nominated	
2016	Gaon Chart K-pop Awards	Album of the Year – 3rd Quarter	Won	
2016	Golden Disc Awards	Album Bonsang	Won	
2016	Golden Disc Awards	Album Daesang	Nominated	

== Track listing ==
No.	Title	Lyrics	Music	Arranger(s)	Length
1.	"Devil"	Kim Yeon-jung	Yeon-jung; Jonathan Yip; Raymond Romulus; Jeremy Reeves; Raymond Charles II; Micah Powell		3:36
2.	"Simply Beautiful"	Jo Yoon-kyung	Hyuk Shin; DK; Marco Reyes; Jarah Gibson; Jeffrey Lewis		4:03
3.	"Stars Appear..." (별이 뜬다; byeol-i tteun; lit. 'The star is out')	Epitone Project	Epitone Project	Epitone Project	3:45
4.	"Good Love"	Yeon-jung	Yeon-jung; Yip; Romulus; Reeves; Charles II; Powell		3:20
5.	"We Can" (performed by SJ-K.R.Y.)	Lee Seung-hwan	Seung-hwan; Hwang Seong-je		3:58
6.	"Don't Wake Me Up" (performed by SJ-D&E)	Lee Dong-hae; Team One Sound	Dong-hae; Team One Sound	Team One Sound	3:08
7.	"Love at First Sight" (첫눈에 반했습니다; cheosnun-e banhaessseubnida; lit. 'I fell in love with you at first sight.') (performed by SJ-T)	Kang Jun-woo	Jun-woo		3:44
8.	"Forever With You" (每天) (performed by SJ-M)	Zhou Mi	Andreas Oberg; Martin K; lLANG		3:12
9.	"Rock'n Shine!"	Kim Yoo-nah	Yoo-nah		3:55
10.	"Alright"	Dong-hae; Lee Hyuk-jae; Team One Sound	Dong-hae; Team One Sound		3:55
Total length:					36:36

Magic (repackaged edition)
No.	Title	Lyrics	Music	Arranger(s)	Length
1.	"Magic"	Yoon-kyoung	Purple J (이주형); G-High; Thomas Sardorf	Purple J (이주형); G-High; Sardorf	3:35
2.	"Devil"	Yeon-jung	Yeon-jung; Yip; Romulus; Reeves; Charles II; Powell		3:36
3.	"Simply Beautiful"	Yoon-kyoung	Shin; DK; Reyes; Gibson; Lewis		4:03
4.	"You Got It" (놈, 놈, 놈; nom, nom, nom; lit. 'That guy, that guy, that guy') (performed by Leeteuk, Heechul, Yesung, Eunhyuk and Donghae)	Park Jeong-su; Kim Hee-chul; Hyuk-jae; Team One Sound	Yip; Romulus; Reeves; Charles II; Three	Yip; Romulus; Reeves; Charles II; Three	4:23
5.	"Dorothy" (도로시; dolosi) (performed by SJ-K.R.Y.)	Kim Jin-ah	Lee Sang-jun	Cha Gil-wan	4:24
6.	"Sarang♥" (performed by Leeteuk and Heechul)	Hee-chul; Team One Sound	Jeong-su; Team One Sound	Team One Sound	3:17
7.	"Stars Appear..." (별이 뜬다; byeol-i tteun; lit. 'The star is out')	Epitone Project	Epitone Project	Epitone Project	3:45
8.	"Good Love"	Yeon-jung	Yeon-jung; Yip; Romulus; Reeves; Charles II; Powell		3:20
9.	"We Can" (performed by SJ-K.R.Y.)	Seung-hwan	Seung-hwan; Seong-je		3:58
10.	"Don't Wake Me Up" (performed by SJ-D&E)	Dong-hae; Team One Sound	Dong-hae; Team One Sound	Team One Sound	3:08
11.	"Love at First Sight" (첫눈에 반했습니다; cheosnun-e banhaessseubnida; lit. 'I fell in love with you at first sight.') (performed by SJ-T)	Jun-woo	Jun-woo		3:44
12.	"Forever With You" (每天) (performed by SJ-M)	Mi	Oberg; Martin K; lLANG		3:12
13.	"Rock'n Shine!"	Yoo-nah	Yoo-nah		3:55
14.	"Alright"	Dong-hae; Hyuk-jae; Team One Sound	Dong-hae; Team One Sound		3:55
Total length:					52:15

== Personnel ==
Credit for Devil are adapted from the album.

- S.M Entertainment Co., Ltd – Executive Producer
- Soo-man Lee – Producer
- Nam Soo-young – Director of Management
- Jung Chang-hwan – Director of Media Planning
- Lee Song-soo, Kwon Yoon-jung, Yoon Ji-hae, I Ga-won – A&R Direction & Coordinator
- Cho Min-kyung, Lee Seo-kyung – International Repertoire
- Jung Hyo-won, Kim Min-kyung, Oh Jung-eun, Park Mi-ji – Publishing & Copyright Clearance
- Vocal director, background vocals – Yoo Young-jin
- Super Junior: Leeteuk, Heechul, Yesung, Kangin, Eunhyuk, Donghae, Siwon, Ryeowook and Kyuhyun – Vocals, background vocals
- Goo Joung-pil (BEAT BURGER) – Recording, mixing (done at S.M. Yellow Tall Studio)
- Kim Chol-Sun – Recording, mixing (done at S.M. Blue Ocean Studio)
- Jang Eui-seok – Recording, mixing (done at S.M. Blue Cup Studio)
- Kim Hyun-goon, Lee Ji-Hyoong, Kim Kyu-yeoung – Recording (done at doobdoob Studio)
- Jang EunGyung – Recording (done at Grid Studio)
- Jag Ki-hoong – Recording (done at Seoul Studio)
- Kim Han-goo – Mixing at Sound Pool Studio
- Tom Coyne – Mastering (mastering done at Sonic Korea)
- Tak Yeong-jun, Kang Byeong-jun, Park Yeong-sin, Kim, Jung-hoon, Wan Yoong-sun, Song In-hoo, Lee Kyu-won, Park Yoong-suk, Lee Hoo-taek, KCho Bum-sun – Artist Management and Promotion
- Lee Seong-Soo, Yoon Hee-jun, Cho Yoo Eun – Artist Planning & Development
- Kim Eun-ah, Jung Sang-hee, Lee Ji-sun, Kwon Jung-ha, Lee Ji-hun – Public Relations & Publicity
- Kim Min Suk, Park Min-Kwon, Jung Kyung-sik – Media Planning
- Tak Young-jun, Hwang Sung-young, Beat Burger (Joe Sim, Greg Hwang) – Choreography Direction
- Toni Testa, Beat Burger (Greg Hwang), Mihawk Back, Hyuno Jin (Look) – Choreographer
- Choi Jung-min – International Marketing
- Steven Myungkyung Lee – English lyrics Supervisor
- Lee Jung-ah – Customer Relationship Management
- Park Jun-young, Sun Young, Jun Sung-jin – Music Video Direction
- Hoong Won-ki – Music Video Director
- Min Hee-jin – Visual & Art Director
- Mok Jung-ook – Photographer
- Kim Yae-min (Assistant, Lee Hye-ri) – Design
- Lee Won-hae – Stylist
- Kim Jung-eun, Kim Hye-yun – Hair Stylist
- Choi Hye-rin, Han Hyoo-eun – Make-up Artist
- Young-min Kim – Executive Supervisor

Credit for Magic are adapted from the album.

- S.M Entertainment Co., Ltd – Executive Producer
- Soo-man Lee – Producer
- Nam Soo-young – Director of Management
- Jung Chang-hwan – Director of Media Planning
- Lee Song-soo, Kwon Yoon-jung, Yoon Ji-hae, I Ga-won – A&R Direction & Coordinator
- Cho Min-kyung, Lee Seo-kyung – International Repertoire
- Jung Hyo-won, Kim Min-kyung, Oh Jung-eun, Park Mi-ji – Publishing & Copyright Clearance
- Vocal director, background vocals – Yoo Young-jin
- Super Junior: Leeteuk, Heechul, Yesung, Kangin, Eunhyuk, Donghae, Siwon, Ryeowook and Kyuhyun – Vocals, background vocals
- Goo Joung-pil (BEAT BURGER) – Recording, mixing (done at S.M. Yellow Tall Studio)
- Kim Chol-Sun – Recording, mixing (done at S.M. Blue Ocean Studio)
- Jang Eui-seok – Recording, mixing (done at S.M. Blue Cup Studio)
- Kim Hyun-goon, Lee Ji-Hyoong, Kim Kyu-yeoung – Recording (done at doobdoob Studio)
- Jang EunGyung – Recording (done at Grid Studio)
- Jag Ki-hoong – Recording (done at Seoul Studio)
- Kim Han-goo – Mixing at Sound Pool Studio
- Tom Coyne – Mastering (mastering done at Sonic Korea)
- Tak Yeong-jun, Kang Byeong-jun, Wan Young-sun, Kim Min-gun, Kim Si-young, Song In-ho, Park Yeong-suk – Artist Management and Promotion
- Lee Seong-Soo, Yoon Hee-jun, Cho Yoo Eun – Artist Planning & Development
- Kim Eun-ah, Jung Sang-hee, Lee Ji-sun, Kwon Jung-ha, Lee Ji-hun – Public Relations & Publicity
- Kim Min Suk, Park Min-Kwon, Jung Kyung-sik – Media Planning
- Tak Young-jun, Hwang Sung-young, Beat Burger (Joe Sim, Greg Hwang) – Choreography Direction
- Toni Testa, Beat Burger (Greg Hwang), Mihawk Back, Hyuno Jin (Look) – Choreographer
- Choi Jung-min – International Marketing
- Steven Myungkyung Lee – English lyrics Supervisor
- Lee Jung-ah – Customer Relationship Management
- Park Jun-young, Sun Young, Jun Sung-jin – Music Video Direction
- Hoong Won-ki – Music Video Director
- Min Hee-jin – Visual & Art Director
- JAworkshop – Design
- Kwon Hte-mi – Stylist
- Kim Jung-eun, Kim Hye-yun – Hair Stylist
- Choi Hye-rin, Han Hyoo-eun – Make-up Artist
- Lee Young-hak – Photographer
- Young-min Kim – Executive Supervisor

== Chart ==
=== Weekly charts ===
Chart (2015)	Peak position
Japanese Albums (Oricon)	8
Japanese Hot Albums (Billboard)	11
South Korean Albums (Gaon)	2
South Korean Albums (Gaon) Magic reissue	1

=== Monthly albums ===
Chart (2015)	Peak position
South Korean Albums (Gaon)	2
South Korean Albums (Gaon) Magic reissue	1

=== Year-end charts ===
Chart (2015)	Peak position
South Korean Albums (Gaon)	9
South Korean Albums (Gaon) Magic reissue	23

== Album sales ==
Region	Sales
South Korea (Gaon)	168,673 (Devil)
South Korea (Gaon)	95,202 (Magic)

== Release history ==
Release history for Devil
Country	Date	Format(s)	Label	Version	Ref
South Korea	July 16, 2015	CD	SM; KT Music	Devil	
Various	July 16, 2015	Digital download; streaming	SM	Devil	
Taiwan	August 14, 2015	CD	Avex Taiwan	Devil	
South Korea	September 16, 2015	CD	SM; KT Music	Magic	
Various	September 16, 2015	Digital download; streaming	SM	Magic	
Taiwan	October 30, 2015	CD	Avex Taiwan	Magic	

== See also ==
- Devil
  - Devil (Music Video) on YouTube
  - Devil (Performance Video) on YouTube
  - Devil (Music Video Teaser) on YouTube
  - Special Album "Devil" (Trailer ver.1) on YouTube
  - Special Album "Devil" (Highlight Medley) on YouTube
- Magic
  - Magic (Music Video) on YouTube
  - Magic (Music Video Teaser) on YouTube
