= Star (Super Junior album) =

2021 compilation album by Super Junior

- First press limited edition cover

Compilation album by Super Junior
- Released: 27 January 2021
- Recorded: 2013–2020
- Studio: 821 (Seoul); DCH (Tokyo); Doobdoob (Seoul); GaeNaRi Sound (Seoul); In Grid (Seoul); MonoTree (Seoul); Seoul; SM Booming System (Seoul); SM Big Shot (Seoul); SM Blue Ocean (Seoul); SM LVYIN (Seoul); SM Yellow Tail (Seoul); The Vibe (Seoul); Yiteh Sound (Seoul)
- Genre: J-pop
- Length: 1:47:13
- Language: Japanese; Korean
- Label: Avex Trax
- Producer: Nam So-young; Shinji Hayashi

Super Junior chronology
I Think U (2020)	Star (2021)	The Renaissance (2021)

Singles from Star
- 1. "Blue World" Released: 11 December 2013; 2. "Mamacita -Ayaya-" Released: 17 December 2014; 3. "Let's Get It On" Released: 30 September 2015; 4. "Devil/Magic" Released: 6 January 2016; 5. "Celebration ～Kimini Kakeru Hashi～" Released: 25 May 2016; 6. "On and On" Released: 6 December 2017; 7. "One More Time (Otra Vez) (feat. Reik)" Released: 28 November 2018; 8. "Sakura no Hanaga Sakukoro" Released: 20 March 2019

Star is a compilation album released by the South Korean boyband Super Junior on 27 January 2021 in Japan under the label Avex Trax. The album compiled the band's past Japanese and Korean singles that were released since 2013. It peaked at number 3 on Oricon Daily Chart on the day of its release.

== Background ==
Since the released of their last Japanese EP I Think U, the band Super Junior had released two singles through their subunits. Super Junior-K.R.Y. released Traveler in October 2020 and Super Junior-D&E released Wings in November 2020. Star was described as the final piece to be released to complete the trilogy.

Star was released on 27 January 2021, as a compilation album to celebrate the band's 15th anniversary. The album compiled the band's previous singles and featured two new tracks. The title track, "Star" is described as an up-tempo dance song with exciting beat and playful melody. The song's lyrics represent the beginning of a new adventure and aiming for the stars; expressing gratitude to their fans and wishes to continue their journey together. The other track is a solo song self-written by Leeteuk. The song was previously sung by the artist during his fan meeting tour in 2016 but was never officially released. The album peaked at number three on Billboard Japan Top Album Sales chart on its first week of sales, selling 24,200 copies.

== Track listing ==
Disc 1
No.	Title	Lyrics	Music	Length
1.	"Mamacita -Ayaya-"	Amon Hayashi	Teddy Riley; Yoo Young-jin; DOM	3:28
2.	"Black Suit"	MEG.ME	Martin Hedegaard; Coach & Sendo	3:22
3.	"Devil"	Amon Hayashi	Kenzie; The Stereotypes; Micah Powell	3:36
4.	"I Think I" (Japanese version)	h.toyosaki	JINBYJIN; Nermin Harambasic	3:21
5.	"One More Time (Otra Vez)" (feat. REIK)	h.toyosaki	Andrea Stone Johansson; Denniz Jamm	3:07
6.	"On and On"	Amon Hayashi	Siwon; IMLAY; Noday; Kago Pengchi	3:43
7.	"Blue World"	Amon Hayashi	Stephan Elfgren; Anders Wigelius	3:22
8.	"Magic"	AKIRA	Lee Joo-hyoung; Thomas Sardorf; G-High	3:36
9.	"Wow! Wow!! Wow!!!"	MEG.ME	Christofer Erixon; Josef Melin	3:22
10.	"Star"	Natsumi Kobayashi	Caesar	2:47
Total length:				33:44

Disc 2
No.	Title	Lyrics	Music	Length
1.	"This Is Love"	Kim Ji-won; Jo Yoon-kyung	Kim Ji-hu; Park Seul-gi; Lola Fair	3:49
2.	"Evanesce"	Misfit	DOM; Teddy Riley; Kim Tae-sung	3:45
3.	"One More Chance"	Donghae; J-DUB; Eunhyuk	Donghae; J-DUB	4:16
4.	"Lo Siento" (feat. Leslie Grace)	Kenzie; Heechul	Dicky "Obi" Klein; Charli Taft	3:46
5.	"Animals"	Cheon Song-yi	Anton Dahlrot; Gionata Caracciolo	3:32
6.	"Super Clap"	lalala Studio	Sebastian Thott; Andreas Oberg; Ninos Hanna	3:28
7.	"2YA2YAO!"	Zico; DemJointz; Pop Time	Zico; DemJointz; Pop Time	3:22
8.	"The Melody"	Leeteuk; Yesung; Min Young-jae	Niclas Kings; Didrik Thott; Andy Love	3:13
Total length:				29:11

Disc 3
No.	Title	Lyrics	Music	Length
1.	"MOTORCYCLE" (Super Junior-D&E)	AKIRA	Lars Pedersen; Renee S. Jackman; Nicky Fredrik Russell; Feras Agwa	3:25
2.	"Saturday Night" (Super Junior-D&E)	S-KEY-A	Henrik Nordenback; Christian Fast; Fernando Fuentes	3:18
3.	"JOIN HANDS" (Super Junior-K.R.Y.)	Sara Sakurai	Fredrik Hult; Andreas Stone Johansson; Andreas Oberg; Steven Lee	3:48
4.	"Let's Get It On" (Super Junior-D&E)	Amon Hayashi	Henry Lau; GEN; Mage	3:04
5.	"Celebration ～Kimini Kakeru Hashi～" (Kyuhyun)	SHIKATA; SKY BEATZ; Mats Lie Skare	SHIKATA; SKY BEATZ; Mats Lie Skare	4:01
6.	"Ame Nochi Hare No Sora No Iro" (Yesung)	Hajime Watanabe; Yesung	Choi Hee-jun; Hwang Seung-chan; Yesung	4:57
7.	"Boku No Majimena Rabu Komedī" (Kyuhyun)	Hidenori Tanaka	Hidenori Tanaka	4:17
8.	"Splash" (Yesung)	Hidenori Tanaka	DONNA; Ricky; CuzD	3:10
9.	"Sunrise" (Super Junior-D&E)	Donghae; J-Dub; Eunhyuk	Donghae; J-Dub; Eunhyuk; Ume	3:32
10.	"Because I Love You ~Taisetsuna Kizuna~" (Yesung)	Yesung; h.toyosaki; Phenomenotes	Yesung; h.toyosaki; Phenomenotes	3:32
11.	"Sakura No Hanaga Saku Koro" (Ryeowook)	Natsumi Kobayashi	Yoon Jong-sung; Naoto Okabe; Jong Jung-seok	3:27
12.	"Coming Home" (Leeteuk)	Hajime Watanabe	Leeteuk; Peter Hyun	3:34
Total length:				44:05

== Charts ==
Weekly sales chart performance for Star
Chart (2021)	Peak position
Japanese Albums (Oricon)	5
Japanese Hot Albums (Billboard Japan)	5
Japanese Download Albums (Billboard Japan)	29

== Release history ==
Release formats for Star
Region	Date	Format	Version	Catalog number	Label
Japan	27 January 2021	CD	First Press limited edition	AVCK-79728～30	Avex Trax
Japan	27 January 2021	CD	Regular edition	AVCK-79731～3	Avex Trax
Japan	27 January 2021	CD	E.L.F. Japan edition	AVC1-79734～6	Avex Trax
Various	27 January 2021	Digital download; streaming	—N/a	—N/a	Avex Trax
