= Rokkugo =

2007 single by Super Junior-T

- Single cover

Single by Super Junior-T
- Language: Korean
- A-side: "Rokkugo"
- B-side: "First Express"
- Released: February 23, 2007
- Recorded: 2006–2007
- Studio: ARCHE (Seoul); SM Concert Hall (Seoul); SM Yellow Tail (Seoul)
- Genre: K-pop; Trot; Novelty; Dance-pop
- Length: 17:12
- Label: SM; Avex Asia
- Producer: Lee Soo-man

Super Junior-T singles chronology
"Rokkugo" (2007)	"Rock & Go" (2008)

"Rokkugo" (Korean: 로꾸거!!!) is the first single by Super Junior-T, released on February 23, 2007. Over 45,997 copies were sold by the end of the year, marking it Korea's sixteenth best-selling record and best-selling single of 2007. "Rokkugo" has been one of Super Junior's most well-known songs.

Super Junior-T re-released this single in Japan on November 5, 2008, collaborating with the Japanese female comedy duo, Moeyan.

== Overview ==
Rokkugo, (로꾸거) is "gokkuro" (거꾸로) spelled backwards, a term meaning "backwards" or "opposite". The single is promoted as a trot single, although influences can be heard in each track, such as rap and stylized modern music rhythms, included K-pop. The music video features fellow label mate Isak as a comedic rabbit who was playing Whack A Mole with the members as the targets. Although trot music are usually more accepted by the older audience because of its older style of Korean popular music, Super Junior-T's "Rokkugo" has been well-accepted by young audiences as each track in the single are bending more towards a new style of trot to attract the attention of the young audience, hoping to make traditional trot music more accepting in mainstream music.

Three more EPs were released after the single was released in Taiwan. A music video and making video of "Rokkugo" is included in the package.

The second track from the single album, "First Express" is originally sung by the girl group Seoul Sisters. Bang Sil-i, a former member of the group, is featured in the Super Junior's cover of the song.

== Track listing ==
Rokkugo track listing
No.	Title	Lyrics	Music	Arrangement	Length
1.	"로꾸거!!! (Rokkugo)"	Yoon Myung-sun; Eunhyuk	Yoon Myung-sun	Yeom Chul-muk	2:59
2.	"첫차 (First Express)" (featuring Bang Sil-i)	Shin Sang-ho; Eunhyuk	Shin Sang-ho	Kim Jeong-bae	2:26
3.	"나 같은건 없는건가요 (Don't Go Away)"	Chu Ga-yeoul; Eunhyuk; Heechul	Chu Ga-yeoul	Ahn Ik-soo	3:12
4.	"로꾸거!!! (Rokkugo) [Instrumental]"		Yoon Myung-sun	Yeom Chul-muk	2:59
5.	"첫차 (First Express) Instrumental"		Shin Sang-ho	Kim Jeong-bae	2:26
6.	"나 같은건 없는건가요 (Don't Go Away) [Instrumental]"		Chu Ga-yeoul	Ahn Ik-soo	3:10
Total length:					17:12

== Credits ==
Credits adapted from album's liner notes. The instrumental version of the songs will not be added due to the same credits.

Studio

- SM Concert Hall Studio – recording, mixing (all tracks)
- SM Yellow Tail Studio – recording (track 1)
- ARCHE Studio – recording (track 3)
- Sonic Korea – mastering (all tracks)

Personnel

- SM Entertainment – executive producer
- Lee Soo-man – producer
- Kim Young-min – executive supervisor
- Super Junior-T – vocals, background vocals (all tracks)
  - Eunhyuk – lyrics (all tracks)
  - Heechul – lyrics (track 3)
- Bang Sil-i – featuring vocals, chorus (track 2)
- Yoon Myung-sun – lyrics, composition (track 1)
- Yeom Chul-muk – arrangement (track 1)
- Shin Sang-ho – lyrics, composition (track 2)
- Kim Jeong-bae – arrangement (track 2)
- Chu Ga-yeoul – lyrics, composition (track 3)
- Ahn Ik-soo – arrangement (track 3), vocal directing (track 3)
- Yoon Jong-shin – vocal directing (track 1)
- Yang Hyun-suk – vocal directing (track 2)
- Lee Jae-myung – guitar (track 1)
- Go Myung-jae – guitar (track 2)
- Sam Lee – guitar (track 3)
- Nam Koong-jin – recording, mixing (all tracks)
- Lee Seong-ho – recording (track 1)
- Oh Se-hyung – recording (track 3)
- Jeon Hoon – mastering (all tracks)

== Japanese release ==
"Rock & Go"

Single by Super Junior-T and Moeyan
- Language: Japanese
- A-side: "Rock & Go"
- B-side: "Ashita no Tameni (For Tomorrow)"
- Released: November 5, 2008
- Recorded: 2008
- Genre: J-pop; trot; dance-pop
- Label: Rhythm Zone

Super Junior-T and Moeyan singles chronology
"Rokkugo" (2007)	"Rock & Go" (2008)

"Rock & Go", also known as "65" (in Japanese language represents Japanese terms for numbers six (roku) and five (go)), is Super Junior-T's second single and first Japanese CD single. The single features Japanese comedic duo Moeyan. "Rock & Go" also marks Moeyan's first musical debut.

"Rock & Go" is the Japanese version of "Rokkugo", and was released in Japan on November 5, 2008. The single debuted at #19 on the Oricon Daily Charts and jumped to #2 three days later.

The single peaked at number fourteen in the Oricon Weekly Albums Chart and charted for two weeks.

=== Track list ===
==== CD ====
1. Rokkugo!
2. Ashita no Tameni (For Tomorrow) / Sungmin (SUPER JUNIOR-T) X Moeyan
3. Rokkugo! (Instrumental)
4. Ashita no Tameni (For Tomorrow) (Instrumental)
5. Ashita no Tameni (For Tomorrow) (Instrumental with Sungmin)

==== CD + DVD ====
1. Rokkugo! (video clip)
2. SUPER JUNIOR-T x Moeyan Trip (promotional clips)
