= Super Junior =

South Korean boy band

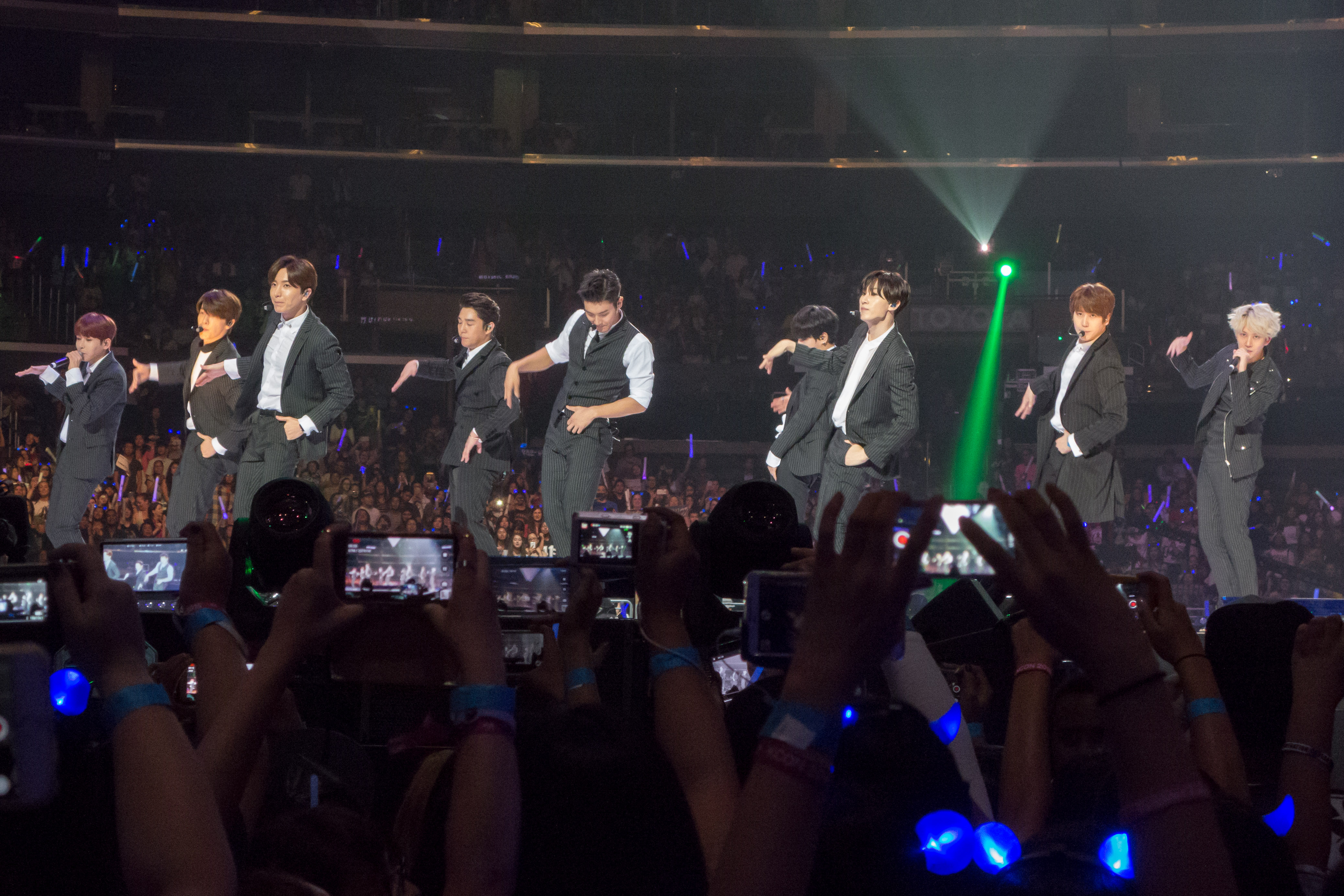
- Super Junior performing Mr. Simple at KCON 2015; From left to right: Ryeowook, Donghae, Leeteuk, Kangin, Siwon, Yesung, Eunhyuk, Kyuhyun, and Heechul

Background information
- Also known as: Super Junior 05 (2005–2006)
- Origin: Seoul, South Korea
- Genres: K-pop; dance-pop; electropop; R&B; hip hop
- Works: Discography; songs; videography; filmography; tours and live performances
- Years active: 2005–present
- Labels: SM; Label SJ; Avex Trax; Media Asia; UMG; ICM
- Member of: SM Town
- Spinoffs: Super Junior-K.R.Y.; Super Junior-T; Super Junior-M; Super Junior-H; Super Junior-D&E; Super Junior-L.S.S.; Super Junior-83z
- Members: Leeteuk; Heechul; Yesung; Shindong; Sungmin; Eunhyuk; Siwon; Donghae; Ryeowook; Kyuhyun
- Past members: Hangeng; Kangin; Kibum
- Website: Official website

Super Junior (Korean: 슈퍼주니어; stylized in all caps), also known as SJ or SuJu, is a South Korean boy band. The group is composed of Leeteuk, Heechul, Yesung, Shindong, Sungmin, Eunhyuk, Siwon, Donghae, Ryeowook, and Kyuhyun. Han Geng, Kibum, and Kangin were originally part of the group before departing in 2011, 2015 and 2019, respectively. The group was formed by the founder of SM Entertainment, Lee Soo-man in 2005 as a 12-piece group with rotational members but the concept was abandoned after the addition of Kyuhyun in 2006. They are also dubbed by the media as the "Kings of Hallyu Wave" due to their contributions in Korean Wave.

Super Junior launched into international recognition following the release of their best-selling single "Sorry, Sorry" in 2009, the title song of their most critically successful album, Sorry, Sorry. Over the years, they have been divided into smaller groups, simultaneously targeting different music industries and audiences. The members have also individually branched out into hosting, presenting and acting. Their successes and popularity as all-rounded entertainers have led other Korean entertainment managements to also begin training their music groups in other aspects of the entertainment industry.

Super Junior was the best-selling K-pop artist for four years in a row. The group has earned thirteen music awards from the Mnet Asian Music Awards, nineteen from the Golden Disc Awards, and are the second singing group to win Favorite Artist Korea at the 2008 MTV Asia Awards after jtL in 2003. In 2012, they were nominated for "Best Asian Act" in MTV Europe Music Awards. They won the "International Artist" and "Best Fandom" awards at the 2015 Teen Choice Awards. In March 2020, Super Junior broke their own record topping the Korean Album Chart of Taiwan's KKBOX for 122 consecutive weeks since 2017 with their 8th album Play, the 8th album repackage Replay in 2018, the 9th album Time_Slip from 2019, and 9th album repackage Timeless.

== Musical career ==
=== 2000–2005: Formation and debut ===
In 2000, SM Entertainment held their first overseas casting auditions in Beijing 101, China, and recruited Han Geng, who was selected among three thousand applicants. That same year, Leeteuk, Yesung, and Eunhyuk were recruited after auditioning for the company's annual casting system in Seoul. Sungmin and Donghae became trainees after jointly winning first place in an SM-sponsored contest in 2001. In 2002, Heechul and Kangin were recruited along with Kibum, who was discovered in Los Angeles, California by a casting agent. Siwon became a trainee after being scouted in 2003. Shindong became a trainee in 2004. Ryeowook won the 2004 Chin Chin Youth Festival singing competition and became a trainee just two months before debut in 2005. Kyuhyun then joined the group in 2006, after winning third place in the 2005 Chin Chin Youth Festival.

In February 2005, it was announced that SM Entertainment would be making a 12-member boy group to debut within the year. This singing group was named to be "The Gateway to Stardom of Asia," as most of the members in this group were chosen for their experiences as actors, MCs, models, and radio hosts prior to debut. Heechul and Kibum were already established actors at the time, and most of the other members had already made various kinds of appearances in television and media. Inspired by the rotational concept of Japan's girl group Morning Musume, Lee said that his new group would also experience line-up changes, with new members replacing selected members every year to keep the group constantly young and all-rounded. This concept was then newly introduced to the K-pop market. They were also modelled after Japanese boy band SMAP, who are also active as actors and entertainers besides being singers.

For a while the group was rumoured to be called O.V.E.R, the acronym for "Obey the Voice for Each Rhythm."^{[a]} However, before the group settled with their current name, the company simply referred to them as juniors, a representation of the members' young ages when they first became SM trainees. After the members showcased their different talents to the company at a picnic, the company finalized their group name to Super Junior, and the first generation of Super Junior officially became Super Junior 05. Super Junior 05 made their pre-debut performance on the Korean channel Mnet on September 11, 2005.^{[b]} At the showcase, they performed various styles of hip-hop dancing, where they danced to B2K's "Take It to the Floor". Han Geng, Eunhyuk, and Donghae also performed a separate dance together, dancing to Usher's "Caught Up." However, the performance did not air on television until May 16, 2006, as a segment in the Super Junior Show, the group's first television documentary.

The group officially debuted on SBS' music program Inkigayo on November 6, 2005, performing their first single "Twins (Knock Out)". Their debut album, Twins, was supposed to release the same day, but its release was delayed to late in November. A digital single with "Twins (Knock Out)" and "You Are the One" was released on November 11, followed by the release of Twins on November 28, 2005. The album sold 28,536 copies in the first month of release and debuted at number three in the monthly chart of December 2005.^{[c]}

=== 2006–2007: U, Don't Don, and commercial success ===
In February 2006, Super Junior 05 began performances for "Miracle", the second promotional single from their debut album. "Miracle" topped the music charts of Thailand, drawing interest from international markets. They were subsequently invited to perform at the Pattaya Music Festival in Thailand in March 2006, making it their first overseas gig. As promotions for "Miracle" ended, SM Entertainment began selecting new members for Super Junior's second generation, Super Junior 06. The company even prepared a list of chosen members that were to graduate from the group. However, the company abandoned the rotational concept after adding a thirteenth member, Kyuhyun, in 2006. The group then became known as just Super Junior, without the suffix "05".

After the addition of Kyuhyun, Super Junior released their single "U" for free download on May 25, 2006, on their official website. "U" exceeded 400,000 downloads within five hours of release and ultimately surpassed 1.7 million downloads, crashing the server. The physical single of "U" with a total of three tracks was released on June 6, eventually selling over 81,000 units in South Korea. The single became one of Korea's most popular songs of the year, taking up number one spots for five consecutive weeks on two of Korea's top music programs. By the end of the year, Super Junior collected over seven awards in five of South Korea's top music award ceremonies, and was one of the three Best Newcomer winners at the 21st Golden Disk Awards.

In late 2006, Kyuhyun, Ryeowook, and Yesung formed the subgroup Super Junior-K.R.Y., Super Junior's first sub-unit. They performed their first single "The One I Love", theme song to the Korean television drama Hyena, on the KBS music program Music Bank on November 5, 2006. In February 2007, Leeteuk, Heechul, Kangin, Sungmin, Shindong and Eunhyuk formed Super Junior-T, a trot-singing group. They released their first single "Rokkugo" on February 23, 2007, and made a debut performance on Popular Songs two days later.

Super Junior's second official album was intended for a late 2006 release, but due to several accidental setbacks, Don't Don was not released until September 20, 2007. Don't Don sold over 60,000 units the first day of release and debuted at number one on the monthly chart of September 2007. Although Don't Don received mixed reviews from critics, the album went to sell more than 160,000 copies by the end of the year, becoming the second best-selling record of 2007.^{[c]} Super Junior received seven nominations at the 2007 Mnet/KM Music Festival, winning three of them which included Artist of the Year, termed by many as the highest recognition of the ceremony. Super Junior collected two more recognitions at the 22nd Golden Disk Awards, including a Disk Bonsang award (Record of the Year).

=== 2008–2009: Sorry, Sorry and career breakthrough ===
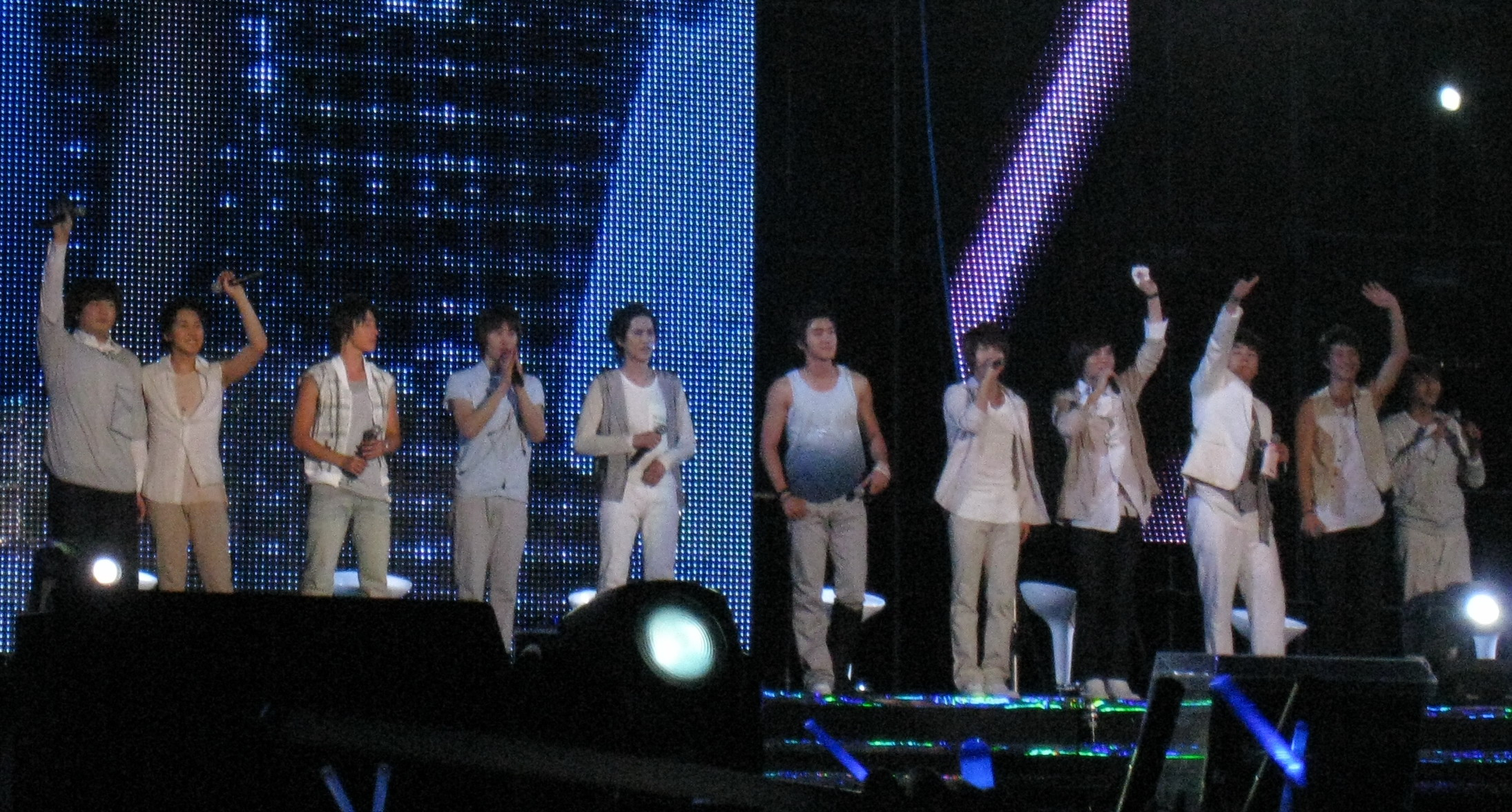
Super Junior performing at SMTown Live '08 in Bangkok, Thailand

Super Junior-M, Super Junior's Mandopop subgroup comprising members Han Geng, Siwon, Donghae, Kyuhyun, Ryeowook, and Super Junior-M members Henry and Zhou Mi, was formed in April 2008. Although the creation of the subgroup initially created a strife between the group's fans and their management,^{[d]} Super Junior-M went on to become Super Junior's most successful subgroup, selling out two concerts in Hong Kong, topping weekly ratings with their appearance on Chinese variety programs, and was the idol group with the most endorsement contracts in China. They won numerous awards at Chinese music festivals, and achieved critical acclaim after the release of their single "Super Girl" from their second record Super Girl, which garnered them a nomination for Best Vocal Group at the 21st Golden Melody Awards. A fourth Super Junior subgroup was created soon after Super Junior-M's debut. With five members from Super Junior-T and Yesung, they formed the subgroup Super Junior-H, releasing their first extended play (EP) Cooking? Cooking! on June 5, 2008. In November 2008, Super Junior-T made a debut in Japan, collaborating with Japanese comedy duo Moeyan. Their single "ROCK&GO", the Japanese – language version of "Rokuko", debuted at number 19 on the Oricon Daily Charts and ascended to number 2 three days later.

Super Junior's first Asia-wide concert tour, Super Show, started on February 22, 2008, in Seoul.^{[e]} The group held a successful two-day fan meeting in Japan at the Nippon Budokan in Tokyo, selling out 12,000 tickets in several days. The group released a compiled single "U/Twins", which includes the Japanese version of "U" in the limited release version, to complement the event. The single peaked at number four on Japan's Oricon Daily Chart on its first day of release, and dropped down four places on its second. The single broke a new record for being the first Korean single to have made within top 10 on Japan's Oricon Weekly Chart.

The group released their third studio album Sorry, Sorry on March 12, 2009. It was their first album to debut at number one on the Hanteo Charts, selling over 29,000 copies the first day. After only a month of release, the album became South Korea's best-selling album of 2009, and ultimately sold over 250,000 copies in South Korea. It became the best-selling K-pop album in Taiwan, Thailand, China, and the Philippines, in which the latter credited the album to be the first K-pop album to reach number one in music charts from the country. The album's title single "Sorry, Sorry" became an instant hit, collecting a total of ten number-one awards for ten consecutive weeks in Korea, and stayed as number one for a record-breaking 37 weeks in Taiwan's K-pop singles chart. "Sorry, Sorry" achieved national and international success, and has since been the group's best-selling single in South Korea. Sorry, Sorry won several accolades at the 24th Golden Disk Awards, including the Disk Daesang (Record of the Year).

After the success of Sorry, Sorry, Super Junior commenced their second Asia-wide concert tour Super Show 2, on July 17, 2009, in Seoul.

=== 2010–2011: Bonamana, lineup changes, and international recognition ===
Despite their critical and commercial success, the group was plagued by legal turmoils and lineup changes during their concert tour. Though Kibum was shown in the ads and promotional videos for Super Show 2, he did not officially participate in the concert tour, and he announced his temporary leave from the group to pursue his acting career. In October 2009, Kangin was charged with a DUI and hit-and-run after crashing into a parked taxi holding three passengers. In December 2009, Han Geng filed for contract termination from SM Entertainment, claiming that the provisions of his contract were unlawful, harsh, and against his rights. He parted with the group and released his solo album Geng Xin in July 2010, which sold over 510,000 copies. That same month, Kangin announced his hiatus to fulfill his two-year mandatory military service.

With only ten members left, Super Junior went off to release their fourth studio album, Bonamana in May 2010. Although the album did not fare as well as Sorry, Sorry critically, it sold over 300,000 copies in South Korea, outselling Sorry, Sorry. "Bonamana" was originally made by moves from Michael Jackson's MV's choreographed together. The album remained at the top of Taiwan's Korean-Japanese Music Charts for 61 weeks, breaking their own previous record of the said chart.

To promote the album, Super Junior embarked on their third Asia-wide tour Super Show 3 in 2010 and 2011, and they had sold-out concerts for each stop. In February 2011, Super Junior released a 3D movie version of their tour, Super Show 3 3D in all CGV and Primus movie theaters. The movie debuted at number six on the box office charts and went off to become the best-selling 3D movie in Korea. After touring in Japan, they released the Super Junior Japan 'Super Show 3' Opening Commemorative Album in February 2011, which debuted at number two on Japan's Tower Records online sales charts. The DVD version of Super Junior Japan Limited Special Edition – Super Show 3 also debuted at number two, while the CD version debuted at number 10. The album also debuted at number 5 and remained at number three spot on the Oricon Daily Chart for two consecutive days and number six on the Oricon Weekly Chart. Following their commercial success in Japan, the group released a Japanese version of Bonamana's self-titled single in June 2011, which debuted at number two on the Oricon Daily Singles chart, selling over 59,000 copies the first week of release, however, SM did not see the release as their official Japanese debut and has stated that their debut in Japan will occur at a later time.

Between Super Show 3 stops, the group took part in the SMTown Live '10 World Tour and toured in Los Angeles, Paris, Tokyo and New York City along with other SM Entertainment-managed artists, performing outside of Asia for the first time. Super Junior's performances were well received by the media, and they were honored as Korea's National Pop Culture Icon for their role in spreading the Hallyu Wave (Korean Wave), receiving the Minister of Culture Awards by the Ministry of Culture, Sports and Tourism at the Pop Culture Art Awards. They were featured on CNN's Talk Asia program, and talked about their popularity and strategy for advancing into the world music industry. The group has achieved recognition beyond Asia, reaching notability in Europe, North America, and South America. Peru's Top 30 ranking of The Sexiest Men in the World included all of the members on the list They gave exclusive interviews to Slovenian and Iranian magazines, and they were selected by Brazilian Hallyu fans to be the number-one Korean artist they want to visit Brazil. Both Mexico's TV Azteca and the United Kingdom's BBC acknowledged Super Junior to be the leading icon of the Hallyu effect.

=== 2011–2012: Mr. Simple and Super Show 4 ===
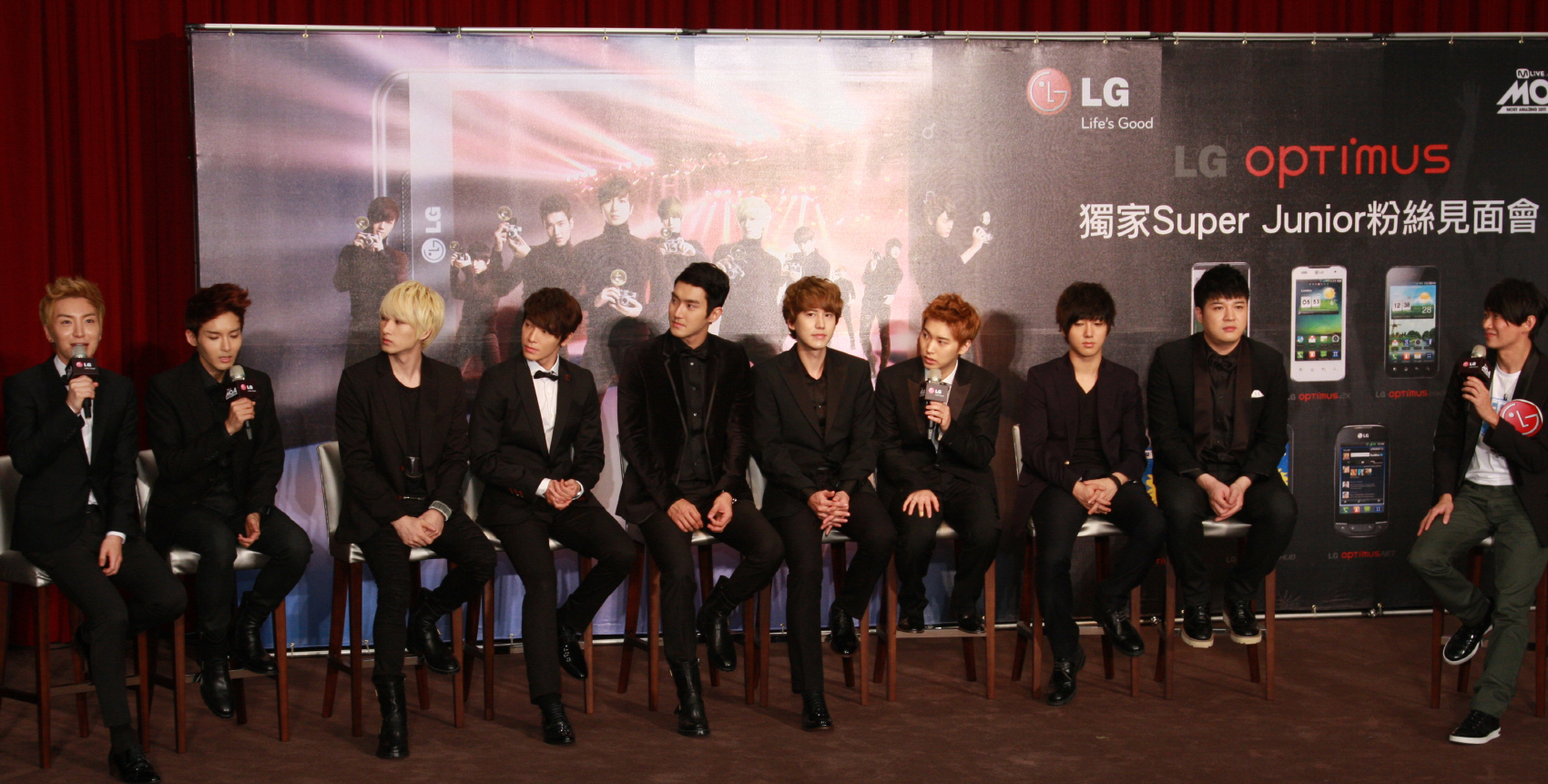
Super Junior members at LG Optimus Super Junior Fan meeting at Chateau de Chine in Kaohsiung, Taiwan in November 2011. (L-R: Leeteuk, Ryeowook, Eunhyuk, Donghae, Siwon, Kyuhyun, Sungmin, Yesung, Shindong)

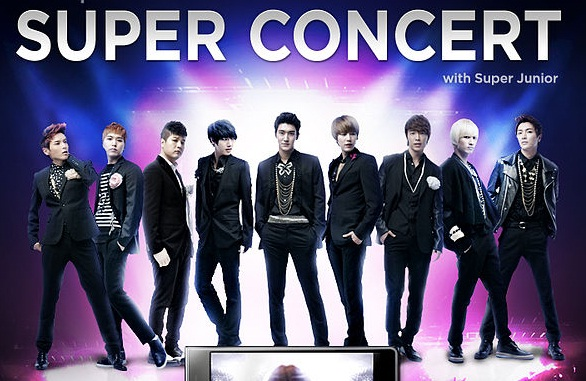
Super Junior

Mr. Simple debuted at number one on the South Korean Gaon Chart, selling 287,427 copies. The album stayed on the chart as number one for four weeks, and sold over 441,000 copies in South Korea by October 2011. It peaked at number three on the Billboard World Albums Chart and number 17 on Japan's Oricon Album's Chart. The album's title single Mr. Simple won first place on the first day of the group's comeback performance on the music show M!Countdown. In September 2011, Heechul left temporarily for military service. Super Junior began their first world tour, the Super Show 4 in November 2011. The group's second Japanese single, a Japanese version of "Mr. Simple", was released December 7, 2011, in Japan, however this was still not recognized by SM as their official Japanese promotional debut.

The group, with Super Junior-M members Zhou Mi and Henry, also recorded the song "Santa U Are The One" for the 2011 Winter SMTown – The Warmest Gift album, released on December 13, 2011. In addition, Donghae and Eunhyuk released their collaboration digital single "Oppa, Oppa" on December 16 and performed the single on Music Bank that same day.

On January 11, Super Junior participated at the 26th Golden Disk Awards which was held at the Kyocera Dome in Osaka, Japan. The group ended up bringing home four awards: Popularity Award, MSN Japan Award, Disk Bonsang and the grand prize Disk Daesang". This was followed by further successes at the Seoul Music Awards on January 19, at which they were awarded the Disk Bonsang and Disk Daesang.

On February 22, Super Junior won Album Of The Year for the 3rd Quarter at the Gaon Chart Awards. On March 13, 2013, Super Junior won Favorite K-Pop Video for "Mr. Simple" at the Myx Music Awards 2012.

Super Junior successfully completed their world tour Super Show 4 in 10 cities worldwide, including Seoul, Osaka, Taipei, Singapore, Macao, Bangkok, Paris, Shanghai, Jakarta, and Tokyo for six months, starting in November. Combined with their three Asia tours and Super Show 4, Super Junior's concert brand gathered a total of 900,000 audiences.

=== 2012–2013: Sexy, Free & Single and Super Show 5 ===
In June 2012, SM Entertainment announced that Kangin would re-join Super Junior for the group's sixth album, Sexy, Free & Single which was released online on July 1 and in stores on July 4, 2012. SM released the MV for Sexy, Free & Single on July 3. The Version B of album was released on July 16, having only a different cover. On August 7, Super Junior released the repackage album for Sexy, Free & Single called SPY, including four new songs, "SPY"; "Outsider"; "Only U", composed by Leeteuk; and "Haru", composed by Donghae. The MV was released on August 13.

Sexy, Free & Single ranked high on iTunes in several countries, including Australia, France, Peru, and Japan. It also ranked third on Billboard World Albums. The album debuted at first place on the South Korean Gaon Chart, selling 335,744 copies in one month. It stayed on the chart at first place for three weeks in a row, and 459,182 copies were sold in only two months (July–August). Sexy, Free & Single also debuted at 1st on Gaon Album Chart, with 356,431 copies sold in 2012. Super Junior ranked first place on Hanteo's "Top 5 K-Pop Artists" 2012, winning Hanteo "Singer Award". They also ranked first place in Hanteo "Album Award" 2012.

Sexy, Free & Single placed first for several weeks on the Taiwan KKBOX KPOP chart, having all album songs charted. The Japanese version of this single, which was released on August 22, has sold over 118,902 units, making the single gold certified.

Super Junior were nominated for "Best Asian Act" in MTV Europe Music Awards, showing again their popularity around the world. In October, Super Junior won "Teen Style Icon" award at the Style Icon Awards and in November they won the "Best Artist Group Award" the 19th Korean Entertainment Arts Awards. On November 30, Super Junior attended the Mnet Asian Music Awards where they won three awards, "Album of the Year", "Best Global Group – Male" and "Best Line Award". This the second year in row that Super Junior won "Album of the Year". Their Super Show 4 3D movie was awarded the "Work of Art Award" at the International 3D Festival; being the only singer together with Glam winning an award. On January 15 Super Junior won "Disk Daesang" at 27th Golden Disk Awards. This was the third "Disk Daesang" that Super Junior has won, and the second in a row (winning in 2011 for "Mr Simple").

Super Junior announced their world tour in February 2013. "The World Tour, Super Show 5" began in March starting with Seoul. The group then went to China, Japan, South America, North America, and Europe. making it the largest K-pop tour in South America yet.

On November 10, Eunhyuk, Kangin, Siwon, and Kyuhyun held a special lecture at the Oxford Union Debating Chamber of Oxford University, entitled "Super Junior: The Last Man Standing". The event was co-hosted by Oxford University Korea Society (OUKS), Oxford University Asia-Pacific Society (OUAPS), and Oxford Union.

=== 2014–2016: Mamacita, Super Show 6, Devil, Magic and Label SJ ===
In August 2014, SM Entertainment announced that the recently discharged Leeteuk and Heechul would re-join Super Junior for the group's seventh album, Mamacita, which was released online on August 29 and in stores on September 1. With only three days of sales, Mamacita ranked No.1 on Billboard's World Albums chart. Super Junior began their world tour Super Show 6 in September 2014, with the first stop at Seoul. They successfully completed their three-day concert at Jamsil Arena, Seoul from September 19 to 21, 2014 and marked their 100th concert worldwide on September 21, 2014. Super Junior are the first Korean artist to perform 100 concerts worldwide. On October 27, Super Junior released the special edition for Mamacita called This Is Love. There is a total of 13 tracks, including nine tracks from the seventh album, a rearranged "This Is Love (Stage Version)", as well as three other songs. This Is Love ranked number one on the real time charts of Hanteo Chart, Sinnara Records and more as soon as it was released.

On July 8, 2015, SM Entertainment announced that Yesung would re-join Super Junior for a special album, Devil, which was released online and in stores on July 16. It was also the best selling album for the week in the United World Charts. Super Junior first showcased its song during its encore concert Super Show 6 in Seoul, over two days from July 11 to 12. They performed four songs from the album, including the title song "Devil", "We Can", "Don't Wake Me Up" and "Alright". On August 16, Super Junior won two awards, "International Artist" and "Best Fandom" in the Teen Choice Awards. Two days later, Kibum (who had been on hiatus since 2009) announced his leave from SM Entertainment and Super Junior via Instagram. On January 24, 2021, Kibum revealed his real reasons for departure in a YouTube segment with Heechul, citing embarrassment and desire of self-harm over his participation in the group.

On September 10, 2015, SM Entertainment announced that Super Junior had released part two of its special 10th anniversary album, Magic on September 16. The album was planned to thank the fans who loved and supported the group, included the 10 previously released tracks from the original special album, Devil, as well as the lead single "Magic", "You Got It", "Dorothy" and "Sarang♥", for a total of 14 tracks. It was the last album released before Eunhyuk, Donghae and Siwon entered the military – Eunhyuk enlisted on October 13 serving active duty, Donghae on October 15 and Siwon on November 19, both as conscripted police officers.

On November 6, 2015, Super Junior's 10th anniversary since their debut, SM Entertainment announced that Super Junior had their own exclusive label management, Label SJ. SM stated, "We established Label SJ to give Super Junior our wholehearted support and an ideal system for managing the group." Though the new label will be affiliated with SM, it will be independently and wholly responsible for Super Junior's management, producing their albums, and all group, unit, and individual activities. On October 11, 2016, Ryeowook began his mandatory military service on active duty followed by Kyuhyun on May 25, 2017, as a public service officer.

=== 2017–2018: Play, One More Time, and Super Show 7 ===
On September 27, 2017, Super Junior's website began a countdown to November 6, – the date of their 12th anniversary – announcing it as their comeback date for their eighth album which would be without Ryeowook and Kyuhyun as they were fulfilling their military service. SJ Returns – Super Junior Real Comeback Story, a reality show featuring the idol group's development of their album, began airing on October 9. On October 30, the music video for "One More Chance" was released as a pre-release track for the forthcoming album. The song is described as a pop rock ballad featuring subtle builds to guide the song's vocals. On October 31, Super Junior's label management SJ Label announced that Choi Siwon would be sitting out of Play promotional activities due to a recent fatal incident involving a family pet dog.

On November 6, Super Junior held a press conference where they spoke about their eighth album, Play, released on the same day. The explanation of the word "Play" was a combination of two meanings—'replay the music' and 'play excitedly'. Play consists of a total of 10 tracks, with "Black Suit" being the lead single. On the same day, the music video for "Black Suit" was released, earning 3 million views in 24 hours. On December 11, Super Junior released their Japanese single album "On and On", which was composed solely by Siwon. In December 2017, Super Junior started their world tour, Super Show 7.

It was announced that a repackage of Play titled Replay would be released on April 12, 2018. The music video of its lead single, "Lo Siento" was released on the same day. It is a "trilingual dance track with tropical leanings", as it is sung in Korean, Spanish, and English. It was produced by Grammy Award-winning producers Play-n-Skillz and features American-born Hispanic singer Leslie Grace. "Lo Siento" debuted at No. 13 on Billboard's Latin Digital Song Sales chart, making Super Junior the first K-pop artist(s) to be featured on this chart. "Lo Siento" also debuted at No. 2 on the World Digital Song Sales Chart. On July 10, 2018, Ryeowook completed his mandatory enlistment. His discharge was shown in a special 2 part episode of Super TV also filmed on Jeju Island.

At the end of August, it was announced that Super Junior would perform at the closing ceremony of the 2018 Asian Games in Jakarta on September 2. Heechul was absent during the performance due to health issues and they performed with just seven members. On October 8, Super Junior released a special EP, One More Time, with its lead single of the same name featuring Mexican band Reik and also Ryeowook in his first group recording following his military discharge on July 10. "One More Time" debuted at No. 18 on the Latin Digital Song Sales chart and at No. 5 on the Latin Pop Digital Song Sales chart. "One More Time" also debuted at No. 4 on World Digital Song Sales chart.

=== 2019–2021: Kangin's departure, Time Slip, Super Show 8, 15th anniversary, Star and The Renaissance ===
On May 7, 2019, Kyuhyun fulfilled his mandatory enlistment, marking the end of Super Junior's military services. On July 11, Kangin voluntarily left Super Junior, although he will maintain his contract with SM and Label SJ. On July 12, 2019, Super Junior brought their Super Show 7S world tour to King Abdullah Sports City as part of the Jeddah Season festival, becoming the first Asian and K-Pop act to hold a solo concert in Saudi Arabia. The sub-units Super Junior-K.R.Y. and Super Junior-D&E also perform in the festival on July 13.

The nine-member lineup of Super Junior released their ninth studio album, Time Slip, on October 14, 2019, with Sungmin to have personal activities outside the group in the meantime. They temporarily halted performances and promotion due to the death of labelmate Sulli. The album is supported by four pre-release singles, "Show", "Somebody New", "The Crown", and "I Think I", and lead single "Super Clap". On October 12, the group embarked on their eighth tour ahead of their album release, Super Show 8: Infinite Time, starting in Seoul, South Korea. On October 20, Super Junior resumed their activities by appearing on Inkigayo to perform their lead single "Super Clap". However, Heechul did not participate with group due to his injury. The album also won first place in weekly music shows M Countdown and Music Bank. Time Slip received its platinum album certification on December 12, 2019.

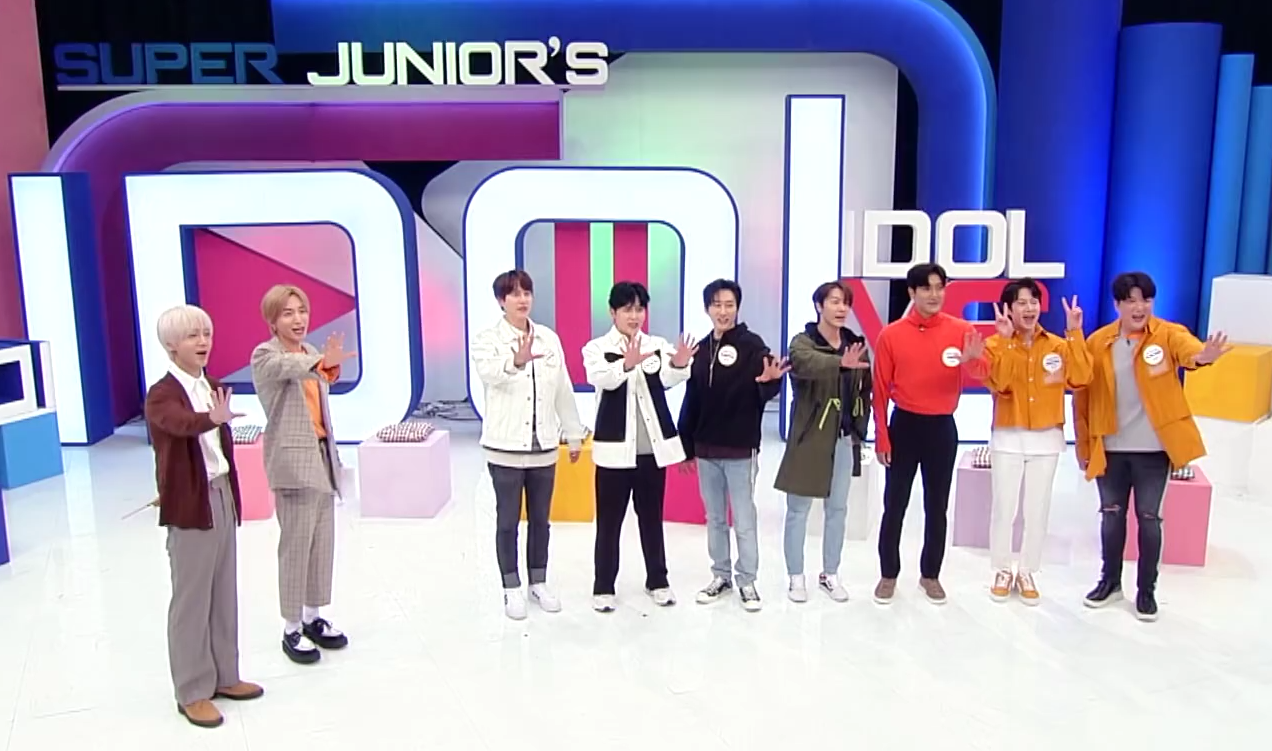
Super Junior appearing in Super Junior's Idol vs Idol in 2020, hosted by Yesung and Leeteuk.

They released their second Japanese mini-album, I Think U on January 29, 2020, which quickly rose to number one on Oricon Daily Albums Chart. In May 2020, it was announced that Super Junior would headline a live online concert – the sixth concert jointly organised by SM Entertainment and Naver as part of the world first high-tech online-dedicated live concert series Beyond Live. This was Super Junior's first concert after the cancellation of several Super Show 8 concerts in 2020 in Japan and other countries due to the impact of the COVID-19 pandemic, and was organized as part of a project of activities in 2020 to celebrate 15 years since the debut of the group. The live concert was held on May 31 and Super Junior played live to an audience of over 123,000 around the world. The concert revenue was estimated to be over 60 billion won. When finished, the main concert video as well as individual member cameras received a total of 2.8 billion hearts on Vlive, the highest record to date out of six concerts within Beyond Live series. During the concert, the hashtag #SUPERJUNIOR_BeyondLIVE' trended first in 13 countries and territories around the world spread across Asia, South America and the Middle East. During the concert, Super Junior played songs by the group and its sub-units. The concert also marked the first stage performance of "Home", the new unreleased track by sub-unit Super Junior K.R.Y from their first Korean album since debut of the sub-unit in 2006, which was released on June 8, 2020.

Super Junior was scheduled to release their tenth studio album, The Renaissance, in December 2020. A pre-release single titled "The Melody" was released on November 6, 2020, to celebrate the group's 15th anniversary. In the same month, the band signed with a US based talent and literacy agency, ICM Partners to represent them in other regions beside Asia. On December 10, it was announced that the release of their album would be delayed to January 2021 in order to improve the album's quality. Meanwhile, Super Junior unveiled a new unreleased single from their album during 2020's The Fact Music Awards on December 12. On January 8, it was announced that the album's new release date would be February 16. However, on February 1, it was announced that the album's release date was pushed back again to March 16.

On the other hand, the band also released a Japanese compilation album on January 27, 2021, in celebration of their 15th anniversary. The album, Star was released under their Japanese label Avex Trax and only featured two new tracks, "Star" and "Coming Home". The album was well received, peaking at number 3 on Oricon Daily Albums Chart on the day of its release, and at number 5 on Oricon Weekly Albums Chart.

=== 2022–present: The Road, Super Show 9 and documentary ===
On February 28, 2022, Super Junior released a special single album entitled The Road: Winter for Spring.

On June 13, 2022, Super Junior announced their first volume of the eleventh studio album The Road: Keep on Going, which was released on July 12. On July 15, the group embarked on their ninth tour ahead of their album release, Super Show 9: Road, starting in Seoul, South Korea. The second volume, entitled The Road: Celebration was released on December 15.

On December 27, 2022, Super Junior announced the release of their eleventh studio album, The Road, on January 6, 2023. The album contained compilation of tracks from their three previous album releases, including The Road: Winter for Spring, The Road: Keep on Going and The Road: Celebration.

On January 18, 2023, Super Junior released a documentary entitled Super Junior: The Last Man Standing on Disney+. The documentary showed the history of the group, with members sharing their inner thoughts and emotions through the documentary.

Super Junior-L.S.S., the sixth subgroup from Super Junior formed by members Leeteuk, Shindong and Siwon, held their first fanmeeting in Japan on November 30 and December 1, 2022. The subgroup released their first Japanese single, entitled Close The Shutter on July 5, 2023, right before their Japan fanmeeting on July 7–8.

On November 4, 2023, the group held a fan meeting to celebrate their 18th anniversary. The event featured all nine currently active members of the group and was streamed live to international audience.

On July 8, 2025, Super Junior released their twelfth studio album Super Junior25, to commemorate the group's 20th anniversary.

== Members ==
In December 2009, Han Geng departed from the group after filing a lawsuit against their agency SM Entertainment. He subsequently won the lawsuit in December 2010, though his departure from Super Junior was not made official until September 27, 2011, when SM Entertainment finally released a statement to that effect.

On August 18, 2015, Kibum announced via his personal SNS that his contract with SM Entertainment had ended and departed from the group. In July 2019, it was announced by Label SJ that Kangin left Super Junior, though he would maintain a contract with SM Entertainment.

All members completed their mandatory military service during the time period from September 2011 through May 2019. Heechul enlisted on September 1, 2011, and completed his service on August 30, 2013. Leeteuk enlisted on October 30, 2012, and completed his service on July 29, 2014. Yesung enlisted on May 6, 2013, and completed his service on May 4, 2015. Shindong enlisted on March 24, 2015, and completed his service on December 23, 2016. Sungmin enlisted on March 31, 2015, and completed his service on December 30, 2016. Eunhyuk enlisted for active duty military service on October 13, 2015. He was discharged on July 12, 2017. Donghae enlisted on October 15, 2015, and was discharged on July 14, 2017. Siwon enlisted on November 19, 2015, and was discharged on August 18, 2017. Ryeowook enlisted on October 11, 2016, and was discharged on July 10, 2018. Kyuhyun was the last member in military service; he enlisted on May 25, 2017, and was discharged on May 7, 2019.

Label SJ confirmed in a statement in March 2020 that although Heechul may not be able to perform on stage, he is still participating in Super Junior albums and other content by recording, as well as taking part in activities such as jacket photoshoots and MV filming.

Currently, Super Junior has nine active members: Leeteuk, Heechul, Yesung, Shindong, Eunhyuk, Siwon, Donghae, Ryeowook and Kyuhyun.

On July 14, 2023, it was announced that Donghae, Eunhyuk, and Kyuhyun had decided not to renew their contracts with SM, but they will still continue their activity as members of Super Junior along with other members.

Current

- Leeteuk (이특) – Leader
- Heechul (Note: Despite participating in the recording of albums and music videos, Heechul does not take part in promotions with the group as a result of injuries sustained in 2006.) (희철)
- Yesung (예성)
- Shindong (신동)
- Sungmin (성민, inactive since 2015)
- Eunhyuk (은혁)
- Donghae (동해)
- Siwon (시원)
- Ryeowook (려욱)
- Kyuhyun (규현)

Former

- Han Geng (한경)
- Kibum (기범)
- Kangin (강인)

== Subgroups ==
Since their debut, seven Super Junior subgroups have been formed. With the exception of Kibum, all of the members have been part of at least one subgroup. The subgroups were part of SM Entertainment's strategy to not limit Super Junior's activities while certain members focused on their individual careers. This allowed the group members greater freedom to focus on different elements of their careers, and gave the group opportunities to explore different musical styles and showcase different skills. The goal of the subgroup formations was also to show that Super Junior could accommodate and perform different musical genres. This strategy was later challenged by critics, as it has influenced an overwhelming number of music groups to create official and unofficial subgroups alike.

In September 2023, their fifth sub-unit Super Junior-D&E became their only sub-unit managed by a different label from Super Junior, following the unit members Donghae and Eunhyuk not renewing their individual contracts with SM Entertainment. When establishing their own label ODE Entertainment, they chose to take the sub-unit's future activities along with them.

On April 13, 2026, Leeteuk and Heechul confirmed that they will be debuting as a new sub-unit Super Junior-83z as both were born in 1983.

Subgroups

- Super Junior-K.R.Y. – Kyuhyun, Ryeowook, Yesung
- Super Junior-T – Leeteuk, Heechul, Shindong, Sungmin, Eunhyuk
- Super Junior-M – Sungmin, Eunhyuk, Siwon, Zhou Mi, Donghae, Ryeowook, Kyuhyun
- Super Junior-H – Leeteuk, Yesung, Shindong, Sungmin, Eunhyuk
- Super Junior-D&E – Donghae, Eunhyuk
- Super Junior-L.S.S. – Leeteuk, Shindong, Siwon
- Super Junior-83z – Leeteuk, Heechul

== Discography ==
Korean albums

- Super Junior 05 (2005)
- Don't Don (2007)
- Sorry, Sorry (2009)
- Bonamana (2010)
- Mr. Simple (2011)
- Sexy, Free & Single (2012)
- Mamacita (2014)
- Devil (2015)
- Play (2017)
- Time_Slip (2019)
- The Renaissance (2021)
- The Road (2022)
- Super Junior25 (2025)

Japanese albums

- Hero (2013)
- Star (2021)

== Artistry ==
=== Musical style ===
Super Junior's musical style has varied from album to album: they pursued bubblegum pop in Twins; alternative rock in Don't Don; pop and contemporary R&B in Sorry, Sorry and Bonamana; electropop and synthpop in Mr. Simple; Eurohouse in Sexy, Free & Single; neo soul and jazz-pop in Mamacita; Latin pop in repackage album of Play – Replay and One More Time; and hip-hop in their latest repackage album of Time Slip – Timeless. The group has also covered few songs in their albums. Their debut single "Twins (Knock Out)" is a cover of Triple Eight's "Knockout," which was released in 2003. In most of their covers, the original titles are kept, such as Cape's "L.O.V.E" and Exile's "Believe", both tracks from Twins. Super Junior works closely with Yoo Young-jin, who has produced and arranged most of the group's title singles since their debut. Yoo is also known for creating the renowned SMP style, a genre that includes a balanced infusion of rock, R&B, and rap, empowered by the sounds of electric guitar, bass, and other different percussion instruments. Super Junior prominently featured this SMP style in Don't Don. The group are also acclaimed for their vocal harmonization and unison as each member contributes a different range in their choruses, and often incorporate different types of vocal belting into their songs.^{[f]}

== Philanthropy ==
Super Junior were ambassadors to many bodies. They were selected to become the ambassador of Ansan city in 2007, and Gangnam District in 2012. They were also appointed as the goodwill ambassadors for the 2008 Korea and Thailand 50th Anniversary, honoring the good relationship between the two countries. On February 20, 2010, Super Junior were named as Taiwan's tourism ambassadors, and as the ambassadors for Korean tourism by Korea Tourism Organization on July 25, 2011. In May 2023, they were appointed as the public relation ambassador to the Saudi Arabia Tourism Authority.

Super Junior are also spokesmodels for the "Donate Blood" campaign at the Republic of Korea National Red Cross since 2007 and were appointed as goodwill ambassadors for World Blood Donor Day. On March 3, 2011, Super Junior were appointed by the Ministry of Food, Agriculture, Forestry and Fisheries of Korea as the 2011 Honorary Korean Food Ambassadors to promote Korean cuisine all over the world. On June 17, 2011, Super Junior were chosen to be the ambassadors of Seoul Summer Sale 2011. They have also been appointed to the same position for Seoul Summer Sale 2012, and 2016.

== Controversies ==
=== Expansion to China ===
Following the subgroups Super Junior-K.R.Y. and Super Junior-T, on October 2, 2007, SM Entertainment announced the birth of another Super Junior sub-unit project that would begin activities in China starting 2008. Zhou Mi and SM Entertainment's new Taiwanese-Canadian trainee Henry Lau, who was also featured in the music video of "Don't Don", were also members of the subgroup. The announcement brought in a huge wave of dissatisfaction and opposition from some fans of Super Junior after the announcement of two new members. Thousands of fans from Super Junior's official fanclub E.L.F. silently sat in front of the SM building and held signs that supported the group having thirteen members. After more rumors regarding adding another member to the subgroup, the fans decided to gain a legal representation as part of SM Entertainment's stockholders. As of March 20, 2008, Super Junior fans purchased 58,206 shares of SM Entertainment, holding 0.3% of the company's entire stock. The fans released a statement that they will take every opportunity to prevent SM Entertainment from adding new members and to keep Super Junior as only thirteen.

=== Conflict with MBC ===
A time-slot dispute occurred between SM Entertainment and MBC when SM insisted to have Kangin stay on SBS' Explorers of the Human Body instead of MBC's Sunday Night Dong-An Club (동안클럽) where Kangin has been a regular host. MBC temporarily banned the rest of Super Junior from appearing in any future performances and shows hosted by MBC. Kangin also lost his MC jobs to T.O.P. of Big Bang for the music show, Show! Music Core and also two more variety shows, which both soon canceled after Kangin left due to low ratings. MBC demanded an apology from SM Entertainment in order for Super Junior to appear on shows hosted by the channel again. However, MBC concluded that Super Junior's ban was never official, but just a decision for shows' producers to decide.

=== Han Geng's lawsuit and departure from group ===
On December 21, 2009, Han Geng filed for contract termination with S.M. Entertainment, unhappy with contract length and salary. On December 21, 2010, the Seoul Central District Court ruled in favor of Han Geng. On September 27, 2011, his departure was made official.

== Tours and concerts ==
Main tours

- Super Show (2008–09)
- Super Show 2 (2009–10)
- Super Show 3 (2010–11)
- Super Show 4 (2011–12)
- Super Show 5 (2013–14)
- Super Show 6 (2014–15)
- Super Show 7 (2017–19)
- Super Show 8: Infinite Time (2019–20)
- Super Show 9: Road (2022–23)
- Super Show 10 (2025–2026)

Fan meeting tours

- Super Camp (2015–16)

Affiliated tours

- SMTown Live '07 Summer Concert (2007)
- SMTown Live '08 (2008–09)
- SM Town Live '10 World Tour (2010–11)
- SM Town Live World Tour III (2012–13)
- SM Town Week – Treasure Island (2013)
- Music Bank World Tour (2013)
- SM Town Live World Tour IV (2014–15)
- SM Town Live World Tour V (2016)
- SM Town Live World Tour VI (2017–18)
- SM Town Live 2022: SMCU Express at Human City Suwon (2022)
- SM Town Live 2022: SMCU Express at Tokyo (2022)
- SM Town Live 2023: SMCU Palace at Kwangya (2023)
- SM Town Live 2023: SMCU Palace at Jakarta (2023)
- KCON (2023)
- SM Town Live 2025: The Culture, the Future (2025)

Online concerts

- Super Junior – Beyond the Super Show (2020)

Online fanmeetings

- Super Junior – 15th Anniversary Special Event: Invitation (2020)
- Super Junior - E.L.F. Japan 10th Anniversary ~The SUPER Blue Party~ (2021)

Online affiliated tours

- a-nation online 2020 (2020)
- 2020 K-Pop x K-Art Concert Super KPA (2020)
- SM Town Live Culture Humanity (2021)
- SM Town Live 2022: SMCU Express at Kwangya (2022)
- SM Town Live 2023: SMCU Palace at Kwangya (2023)

== Awards and recognition ==
The group's song "U", earned Super Junior their first music award, the SBS Popular Songs Mutizen Song in June 2006. The single earned the group four more distinctive song awards, and the group grabbed their first MKMF award from the Mnet/KM Music Festival in November 2006. In terms of recognition in other areas of Asia, Super Junior is the first overseas artist to win Asia's Artist of the Year at the Tencent Stars Magnificent Ceremony in China, and is also the second musical group to win Favorite Artist Korea at the MTV Asia Awards, after jtL in 2003. Super Junior have earned 20 music awards at the Golden Disc Awards, 13 at the Mnet Asian Music Awards and 12 at the Seoul Music Awards. Super Junior is the first Asian artist who won International Artist at the 2015 Teen Choice Awards.

Super Junior won Legend Award a special title given by Asia Artist Awards in November 2017 and also won Top of K-Pop Record in November 2019 due to their prominent contributions in Korean Wave leading K-pop to its current state of global awareness. In January 2019, Super Junior won "Artist of the Year Award" at the 14th KKBOX Music Awards in Taiwan. Super Junior is the first non-Chinese artist to receive the "Artist of the Year" award.

Super Junior have also gained recognition for their dress style and fashion throughout their career. They hailed as the best-dressed artist at the 2007 Summer Break 20's Choice Awards, and also earned a similar nomination the following year. The group have also earned titles for their dance choreography and popularity.

== See also ==
- List of best-selling albums in South Korea
- List of dancers
