= Devil (Super Junior song) =

- CD+DVD version cover

Single by Super Junior

from the album Devil
- Language: Korean; Japanese
- A-side: "Magic" (JP)
- Released: July 16, 2015; January 6, 2016 (Japan)
- Recorded: 2015
- Studio: Doobdoob (Seoul); InGrid (Seoul); SM Yellow Tail (Seoul)
- Genre: Dance-rock; funk rock
- Length: 3:36
- Label: SM; KT; Avex Trax
- Composers: Jonathan Yip; Raymond Romulus; Jeremy Reeves; Raymond Charles McCullough II; Micah Powell; Kenzie
- Lyricists: Kenzie; Amon Hayashi (JP)
- Producers: The Stereotypes; Kenzie

Super Junior singles chronology
"Evanesce" (2014)	"Devil" (2015)	"Magic" (2015)

Music video
- "Devil" on YouTube

"Devil" is a song recorded by South Korean boy band Super Junior that was released on July 16, 2015, by their label SM Entertainment and distributed by KT Music. It is the lead single of the album of the same.

The track featured the vocals of Yesung after he was discharged from his mandatory military service on May 4, 2015, and it's also served as the first single without the vocals of Sungmin and Shindong who were serving their mandatory military service at that time. The single charted at number 21 on the national chart Gaon Digital Chart and sold over 150,000 digital download on said Chart.

In Japan, "Devil" was released as a double A-side single titled "Devil / Magic" on January 6, 2016. It peaked at number two on the Oricon Singles Chart and sold over 65,000 copies.

== Background and release ==
Following the release of their commercially successful seventh studio album Mamacita the following year, Super Junior embarked on their sixth overall tour Super Show 6 from September 19, 2014, to July 12, 2015, for encore concerts in Seoul.

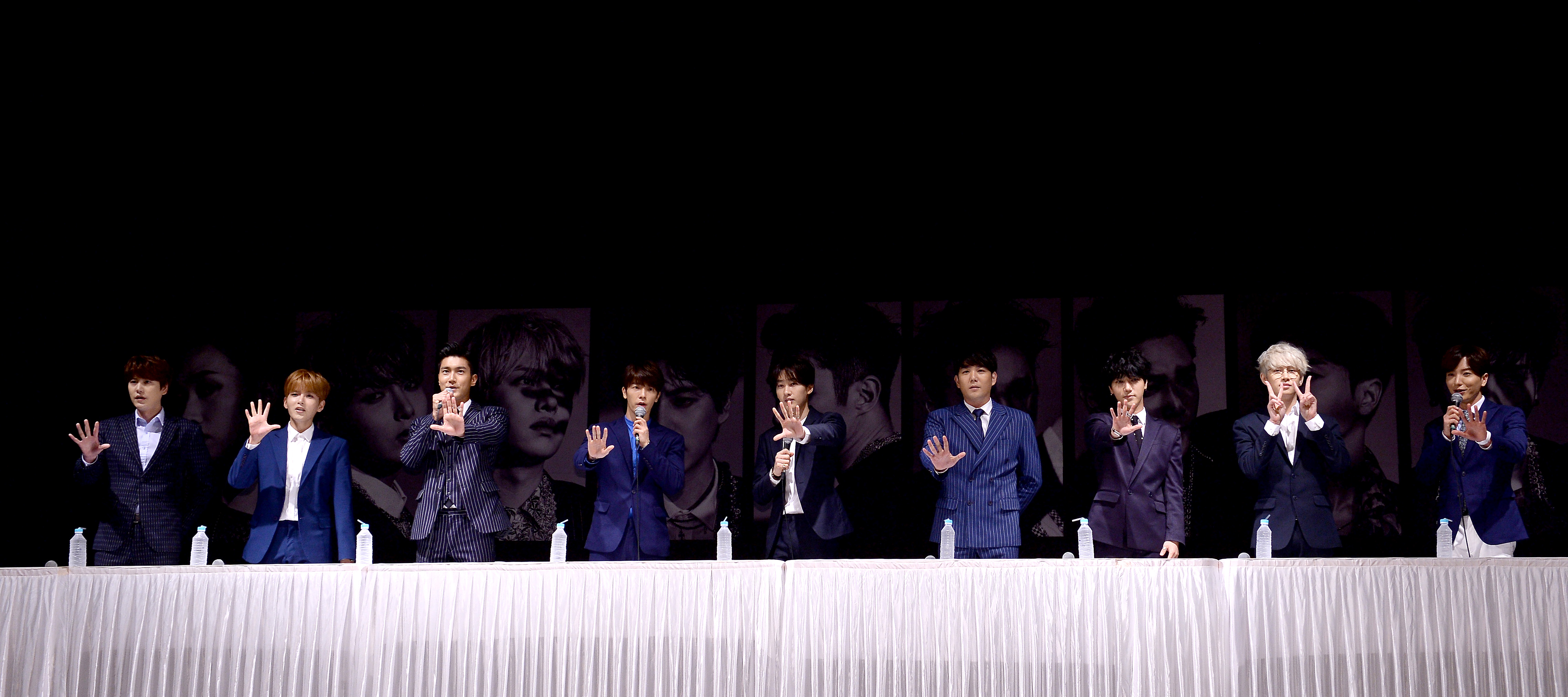
Super Junior members during Devil press conference on July 15

On July 8, SM Entertainment announced that Super Junior will have a comeback by releasing special album Devil on July 16 to commemorate the group's 10th anniversary. "Devil" was announced as the lead single on July 9, with American production team The Stereotypes collaborating with SM's in-house songwriter-producer Kenzie.

The Japanese version of the song was released on January 6, 2016, along with "Magic", the single from the repackage album of Devil (Magic). The song is included in the band's Japanese compilation album, Star. The single went to sell over 65,800 physical copies.

== Composition ==
"Devil" features the vocals of nine Super Junior members — Leeteuk, Heechul, Yesung, Kangin, Donghae, Eunhyuk, Siwon, Ryeowook, and Kyuhyun. Shindong and Sungmin's vocals were not featured as they were undergoing mandatory military service from March 24 and 31 respectively.

"Devil" is described as funk rock song with a trendy melody produced by American production team, The Stereotypes, and SM Entertainment's resident songwriter, Kenzie. Both of them also co-wrote the song with Micah Powell. The song marked the departure of Yoo Young-jin who wrote the group's title track since their debut. The lyrics illustrates a candid confession of a man who is madly in love.

During the press conference, Leeteuk introduced "Devil" as a different song from SJ Funky songs, while Eunhyuk said the song has both dark side and bright side, and allowed the group to show various charms through this release.

"Devil" was then re-released in Japanese version along with "Magic", the lead single from the Devil repackage album, Magic on January 11, 2016.

== Critical reception ==
Billboard columnist Jeff Benjamin praised the release of "Devil" and considered it the band's best release since "Mr. Simple" back in 2011.

== Music video ==
During the group's encore concert, Super Show 6 in Seoul on July 11, 2015, band leader Leeteuk announced to the fans that the music video for "Devil" will be the first-ever music video by SM Entertainment that is classified 19+. Leeteuk explained the change from the usual family-friendly songs citing the fans' grew up together with the band in the last 10 years. At the same concert, Leeteuk also went to explain that the band hoped that "Devil" would replace "Sorry, Sorry" as the band's signature track. The performance of "Devil" was crafted by choreographer Tony Testa and SM's performance director, BeatBurger. The music video was officially released on YouTube on July 15, 2015.

== Live performances ==
"Devil" was performed live for the first time on Super Show 6 encore concert on July 11 and 12. It was then featured in the setlist of Super Junior's Super Camp fan meeting tour. It has been a common setlist in Super Junior's headlining concerts Super Show 7, Super Show 8, and Super Show 9.

== Track listing ==
Japanese CD single

1. "Devil" – 3:37
2. "Magic" – 3:36
3. "Devil" (Instrumental) – 3:37
4. "Magic" (Instrumental) – 3:36

== Credits ==
Credits adapted from album's liner notes.

Studio

- SM Yellow Tail Studio – recording, mixing
- In Grid Studio – recording
- Doobdoob Studio – recording, digital editing
- Sterling Sound – mastering

Personnel

- SM Entertainment – executive producer
- Lee Soo-man – producer
- Super Junior – vocals
  - Yesung – background vocals
  - Ryeowook – background vocals
  - Kyuhyun – background vocals
- Kenzie – producer, Korean lyrics, composition, arrangement, vocal directing
- Amon Hayashi – Japanese lyrics
- Jonathan Yip (The Stereotypes) – producer, composition, arrangement
- Raymond Romulus (The Stereotypes) – producer, composition, arrangement
- Jeremy Reeves (The Stereotypes) – producer, composition, arrangement
- Raymond Charles McCullough II (The Stereotypes) – producer, composition, arrangement
- Micah Powell – composition, arrangement, background vocals
- Kye Bum-soo – background vocals
- Koo Jong-pil – recording, mixing
- Jeong Eun-kyung – recording
- Kim Hyun-gon – recording
- Lee Ji-hong – recording, digital editing
- Tom Coyne – mastering

== Charts ==
Weekly chart performance for "Devil"
Chart (2015–16)	Peak positions
Japan Hot 100 (Billboard Japan)	5
Japan (Oricon)	2
South Korea (Gaon)	21
US World Digital Song Sales (Billboard)	6

== Release history ==
Release dates and formats
Region	Date	Version	Format(s)	Label
South Korea	July 16, 2015	Korean	Digital download; streaming	SM; KT
Various	July 16, 2015	Korean	Digital download; streaming	SM
Japan	January 6, 2016	Japanese	CD; DVD	Avex Trax
Various	January 6, 2016	Japanese	Digital download; streaming	Avex Trax
