= Magic (Super Junior song) =

Single by Super Junior

from the album Magic
- Language: Korean; Japanese
- A-side: "Devil" (JP)
- Released: September 16, 2015; January 6, 2016 (Japan)
- Recorded: 2015
- Studio: SM Blue Ocean (Seoul)
- Genre: K-pop; Dance-funk
- Length: 3:35
- Label: SM; KT; Avex Trax
- Composers: Purple J; G-High; Thomas Sardorf
- Lyricists: Jo Yoon-kyung; Kim Hee-chul; Eunhyuk; Akira (JP)
- Producers: Purple J; G-High

Super Junior singles chronology
"Devil" (2015)	"Magic" (2015)	"One More Chance" (2017)

Music video
- "Magic" on YouTube

"Magic" is a single released by South Korean boy band Super Junior on September 16, 2015. It is the lead single of the repackage album of the same name. The single is the last single to feature the vocals of Kangin before his hiatus in 2017 and eventual departure from the group in 2019. Additionally, this single was the group's last release before the majority of its members are undergoing their mandatory military service.

The single was then released in Japanese on January 6, 2016, alongside "Devil", and both tracks were later featured on the band's Japanese compilation album, Star.

== Background ==
On July 16, 2015, Super Junior released their eighth overall album, Devil with its lead single of the same name.

On September 11, SM Entertainment announced that the album would be reissued as Magic with the lead single of the same name scheduled to be released on September 16. Three days later, SM uploaded the teaser video for the song's music video.

== Composition ==
"Magic" has the same love-related themes as the four new tracks on the repackaged album. The single has groovy sounds with funky guitars and bass.

== Music video ==
The music video for "Magic" was released on the same day as the single's release on September 16, 2015.

The music video shows the members trying to outdo one another to impress and grab a girl's attention. Eventually, Kangin won in the end.

== Live performances ==
"Magic" has been performed on the group's concerts — Super Camp, Super Show 7, and Super Show 9: Road.

== Track listing ==
Japanese CD single

1. "Devil" – 3:37
2. "Magic" – 3:36
3. "Devil" (Instrumental) – 3:37
4. "Magic" (Instrumental) – 3:36

== Charts ==
Weekly chart performance for "Magic"
Chart (2015–16)	Peak positions
Japan (Oricon)	2
South Korea (Gaon)	87
US World Digital Song Sales (Billboard)	13

== Credits ==
Credits adapted from album's liner notes.

Studio

- SM Blue Ocean Studio – recording
- MonoTree Studio – digital editing
- SM Concert Hall Studio – mixing
- Sterling Sound – mastering

Personnel

- SM Entertainment – executive producer
- Lee Soo-man – producer
- Kim Young-min – executive supervisor
- Super Junior – vocals, background vocals
  - Heechul – Korean lyrics
  - Eunhyuk – Korean lyrics
- Jo Yoon-kyung – Korean lyrics
- Akira – Japanese lyrics
- Thomas Sardorf – composition, arrangement
- Lee Joo-hyung a.k.a. Purple J – producer, composition, arrangement, digital editing
- G-High – producer, composition, arrangement, vocal directing, keyboards
- Hwang Hyun – arrangement
- Byun Jang-moon – background vocals
- Choi Hoon – bass
- Jeong Su-wan – guitar
- Kim Cheol-sun – recording
- Nam Koong-jin – mixing
- Tom Coyne – mastering

== Release history ==
Release dates and formats
Region	Date	Version	Format(s)	Distributor
South Korea	September 16, 2015	Korean	Digital download; streaming	SM; KT
Various	September 16, 2015	Korean	Digital download; streaming	SM
Japan	January 6, 2016	Japanese	CD; DVD	Avex Trax
Various	January 6, 2016	Japanese	Digital download; streaming	Avex Trax
