= Blue World (Super Junior song) =

- CD+DVD version

Single by Super Junior
- B-side: "Candy"
- Released: December 11, 2013
- Recorded: 2013
- Studio: In Grid (Seoul); Supalove (Tokyo)
- Genre: J-pop; Dance-pop
- Length: 3:24
- Label: Avex Trax
- Composers: Stephan Elfgren; Anders Wigelius
- Lyricist: Amon Hayashi
- Producer: Stephan Elfgren

Super Junior singles chronology
"Spy" (2012)	"Blue World" (2013)	"Mamacita (Ayaya)" (2014)

Music video
- "Blue World" (Short ver.) on YouTube

Blue World is the fifth Japanese language single of South Korean boy band Super Junior, released on 11 December 2013 by Avex Trax.

== Background ==
It was announced on September 26, 2013, during the event E.L.F-JAPAN FESTIVAL 2013 that Super Junior would be releasing their fifth official Japanese single, "Blue World", in December 2013. The song will be the first original Japanese release by the group. It was later revealed on October 23 the single was set for December 11, containing on the B-Side another song named "Candy". The single was released in three different editions: CD-only, 2CD+DVD, and E.L.F JAPAN version.

On November 8, 2013, Avex released a highlight medley of the upcoming single through YouTube with a preview of both songs and revealed the different covers from each edition of the single. This will be the first song of the group involving Heechul after he came back from the military service.

== Commercial performance ==
"Blue World" peaked on the daily Oricon Singles Chart at number two, having sold 46,968 copies. It charted at #2 in the Oricon Weekly Chart with 68,684 copies sold.

== Promotion ==
Super Junior made a collaboration with Tokyo JoyPolis named "Play the Blue World" with 3D technology, full color laser system and illumination stage until January 13, 2014, to promote the single. Super Junior also perform a live version of the song in their Super Show 5 in Kyocera Dome, Osaka in November 2013.

== Track listing ==
CD
No.	Title	Lyrics	Music	Arrangement	Length
1.	"Blue World"	Amon Hayashi	Stephan Elfgren; Anders Wigelius	Stephan Elfgren	3:24
2.	"Candy"	Akira	Daichi; Robin Ericsson; Jin Choi	Jin Choi	3:25
3.	"Blue World" (Less vocal)	Amon Hayashi	Stephan Elfgren; Anders Wigelius	Stephan Elfgren	3:24
4.	"Candy" (Less vocal)	AKIRA	Daichi; Robin Ericsson; Jin Choi	Jin Choi	3:25
Total length:					13:38

DVD

1. "Blue World" music video
2. "Blue World" music video making-of

== Credits ==
Credits adapted from single's liner notes.

Studio

- In Grid Studio – recording
- Supalove Studio – recording
- Prime Sound Studio – mixing
- Parasight – mastering

Personnel

- SM Entertainment – executive producer
- Avex Group – executive producer
- Super Junior – vocals, background vocals
- Amon Hayashi – lyrics
- Stephan Elfgren – producer, composition, arrangement
- Anders Wigelius – composition
- Tesung Kim – vocal directing
- Akihiro Kondo (Soulmatics) – background vocals
- Jeong Eun-kyung – recording
- Tak Miyazawa – recording
- Yuya Saito – additional sound operating
- Yoshiaki Onishi – mixing
- Hiromichi "Tucky" Takiguchi – mastering

== Charts and sales ==
=== Oricon ===
Chart (2013	Peak position	Sales
Daily Singles Chart	2	77,026+
Weekly Singles Chart	3	77,026+
Monthly Singles Chart	9	77,026+

== Release history ==
Release history for "Blue World"
Region	Date	Format	Label	Ref
Japan	December 11, 2013	CD; DVD	Avex Trax	
Various	December 11, 2013	Digital download; streaming	Avex Trax	
