= Super Junior-T =

Subgroup of the South Korean boy band Super Junior

- Origin: Seoul, South Korea
- Genres: K-pop; trot; novelty
- Years active: 2007–2008; 2015
- Labels: SM; Label SJ; Avex Asia; Rhythm Zone
- Spinoff of: Super Junior
- Members: Leeteuk; Heechul; Shindong; Sungmin; Eunhyuk
- Past members: Kangin
- Website: Official website

Super Junior-T (Korean: 슈퍼주니어-트; an initialism for Super Junior-Trot) is the second official sub-unit of South Korean boy band Super Junior, consists of Leeteuk, Heechul, Shindong, Sungmin and Eunhyuk. They are known as the first idol group for capitalizing trot music, the oldest form of Korean pop music.

Super Junior-T released their debut single "Rokuko" on 23 February 2007. Their debut single was listed as Korea's sixteenth best-selling record and the number one best-selling single of 2007, according to the Music Industry Association of Korea. In November 2008, the unit debut in Japan with released the Japanese version of "Rokuko".

== History ==
=== Pre-debut ===
Noticing the dying trend of trot music, Lee Soo Man decided to revive the style by producing an idol band that capitalizes this genre. Three months prior Super Junior-T's official debut, they first performance the song "Don't Go Away" at the M.NET KM Music Festival on November 25, 2006 along with Super Junior's Donghae.

=== 2007: Commercial success ===
In early February, SM Entertainment made the official announcement of a second Super Junior subgroup, Super Junior-T. The group released their debut single "Rokuko" on February 23, 2007 and on February 25, 2007, they officially debuted on SBS' Popular Songs, performing "Rokuko" and "First Express" with famous trot singer Bang Shilyi. The debut was also marked as Heechul's comeback performance after his injury from a car accident that occurred in August 2006.

"Rokuko" topped music charts three days after release. Two months later, the single topped Thailand-based music stations and remained in the same position for several weeks. By the end of 2007, the single sold almost 46,000 copies and was Korea's best-selling single of the year.

Two months later, Leeteuk, Shindong, and Eunhyuk were injured in a car accident, and all of Super Junior-T's schedules were completely canceled for two months. However, pre-recorded performances, such as the group's parody Palace T, continued to air on television and their single continued to top music charts. Schedules resumed in June, but only lasted a month.

=== 2008: Performance tours and Japan ===
On April 29, 2008, it was announced that Super Junior-T would make a comeback later in the year with their second single. However, a fourth Super Junior sub-unit, Super Junior-Happy, debuted instead, putting Super Junior-T in partial hiatus. Nonetheless, Super Junior-T remained partially active throughout the year as they still appear as a group in Super Junior's concert tour, Super Show and other similar functions. Despite the debut of Super Junior-Happy, a future full-length album is still in the works and is expected to arrive in the future. Super Junior-T's latest appearance before the debut of Super Junior-Happy was on May 17, 2008, performing as the opening act at the 6th Korean Music Festival in Los Angeles, California.

On November 5, 2008, Super Junior-T re-released "Rokuko", now titled "ROCK&GO", in Japan. Presenting this project to the Japanese comedy duo Moeyan, who are skilled in combining comedy with song and dance, Super Junior-T hopes that the duo will help them localize the single into Japanese. The collaboration was the duo's official debut as singers and Super Junior-T's entrance in the Japanese market. The single debuted at #19 on the Oricon Daily Charts and jumped to #2 three days later. Super Junior-T and Moeyan held two mini concerts on the same release date as the single in the C.C. Lemon Hall at Tokyo to promote the record.

=== 2015: "Love at First Sight" ===
In 2015, Super Junior returned with special album Devil on July 16 to celebrate the group's 10th anniversary. The album has a total of 10 tracks including the Track "Love at First Sight". The track is partly classified by Super Junior-T and Kang Junwoo writing lyrics and composing for it.

The group made their comeback performance on the Korean music show M! Countdown with the song "Love at First Sight" on July 16, 2015.

== Image ==
Super Junior-T is well known for their parodies, such as the short miniseries Palace T, a parody of the popular Korean drama Princess Hours, which aired on the channel M.NET, as a part of Idol World.

Due to Super Junior-T's active participance in trot music and their comedic appearances, the group gained outstanding attention from the older audience despite their well-known young idol images that was created for them in the main group Super Junior. Members of Super Junior-T explained that they wanted to change their idol appearance and hope that they would gain different fans from their new trot image.

== Discography ==
=== Single album ===
List of single albums, with selected details, chart positions and sales
Title	Details	Peak chart positions		Sales
Title	Details	KOR Gaon	KOR RIAK	Sales
Rokkugo	Released: February 23, 2007; Label: SM Entertainment; Format: Cassette, CD	33	2	45,000

=== Singles ===
List of singles as lead artist, with selected chart positions and sales, showing year released and album name
Title	Details	Peak chart positions		Sales	Album
Title	Details	KOR	JPN	Sales	Album
"Rokkugo" (로꾸거!!!)	Released: February 23, 2007; Language: Korean; Format: CD, DVD	—	–		Non-album single
"ROCK&GO" (with Moeyan)	Released: November 5, 2008; Language: Japanese; Format: CD, DVD	–	14	JPN: 11,443+	Non-album single
"—" denotes releases that did not chart or were not released in that territory.

== Videography ==
Year	Track	Album	Released
2007	"Rokuko"	Korean single	February 22
2008	"Rock & Go" (ft. Moeyan)	Japanese single	November 5
