= Super Show 2 =

2009–10 concert tour by Super Junior

- Tour by Super Junior
- Promotional poster for Super Show 2
- Associated album: Sorry, Sorry
- Start date: July 17, 2009
- End date: April 10, 2010
- No. of shows: 15 in total
- Website: superjunior.smtown.com

Super Junior concert chronology
- Super Show (2008–09); Super Show 2 (2009–10); Super Show 3 (2010–11)

Super Show 2 is the second Asia-wide live concert tour by the South Korean boy band Super Junior, to support their third studio album, Sorry, Sorry. The tour commenced with three shows in Seoul, South Korea in July 2009 and continued with one show in Hong Kong, five in China, two in Thailand, two in Taiwan, one in Malaysia and one in Philippines. A total of 15 shows in nine cities and six countries throughout Asia.

Live album Super Show 2 Tour Concert Album, recorded at the concerts held in Seoul from July 17 to 19, 2009, with 35 tracks and five studio version bonus tracks: remixed version of "Sorry, Sorry", R&B ballad "Sorry Sorry-Answer", re-arranged versions of "It's You" and "Shining Star" as well as classic pop track "Puff The Magic Dragon" was released on December 10, 2009.

== Concerts ==
On June 3, 2009, shortly after Super Junior began their promotions on "It's You", from the repackaged edition of their third album Sorry, Sorry, SM Entertainment announced the group's second Asia tour. Thus the promotions for "It's You" ended on June 21 in preparations for the start of the tour in July 2009.

Tickets for the July 17 concert in Seoul went on sale on June 16 at 20:00 and were sold out in 10 minutes. The second and third ticket batch went on sale on June 17 and 18 respectively and were also sold out in under 10 minutes.

The Hong Kong concert was the last Super Junior activity that member Kangin took part in before his activities were suspended following his involvement in a bar fight in the early hours of September 16 in Nonhyeon-dong, Gangnam-gu, Seoul.

The Shanghai concerts of the tour was the official opening performance of the 11th Shanghai International Art Festival, hosted by China's Ministry of Culture. For which they received a medal of appreciation from the city of Shanghai and the concert was attended by 12,000 people. The two Bangkok concerts was played to an audience of 32,000 and that 5,000 people queued overnight the day before the tickets went on sale."

== Setlist ==
South Korea (Opening Weekend)

Super Junior Intro

- "Galjeung (A Man in Love)" (Remix ver.)
- "U" (Remix ver.)
- "It's You" (Remix ver.)

First video interlude

- "She Wants It"
- MENT #1
- "Angela"
- "Miracle" (Rock remix)
- "Disco Drive" (Remix ver.)
- "Dancing Out" (Remix ver.)

Second video interlude

- "Baby Baby" – Sungmin
- "Soul" – Heechul (ft. Jungmo on guitar)
- "Beautiful" – Donghae (ft. Eunhyuk)
- "Resignation" – Yesung
- "Insomnia" – Ryeowook
- "Seven Years of Love" – Kyuhyun
- "What if" – Yesung, Sungmin, Ryeowook, Kyuhyun
- "Heartquake" – Yesung, Eunhyuk, Ryeowook, Kyuhyun
- "Honey" – Leeteuk
- "Dance with DOC/Run to you" – Kang-in, Leeteuk, Shindong, Sungmin, Eunhyuk, Donghae)

Third video interlude

- "Don't Don" (Remix ver.)
- "Twins (Knock Out)"

Fourth video interlude

- "Our Love"

Fifth video interlude

- Dance off (ft. Han Geng, Shindong, Eunhyuk, Donghae)
- "Who Am I" – Siwon (ft. Ryeowook on keyboard)
- "At Least There's Still You" – Super Junior-M
- "Me" – Super Junior-M
- "Super Girl Korean Version" Super Junior-M
- "Blue Tomorrow Korean Version" Super Junior-M

Sixth video interlude

- "Shining Star"
- "Puff The Magic Dragon - Kyuhyun Feat. Super Junior Members"

Seventh video interlude

- "Superman" (Norazo cover) – Super Junior-T
- "Rokuko" – Super Junior-T

Eighth video interlude - The Secret of "Gee" (featuring Girls' Generation)

- "Gee" (originally by Girls' Generation) – Leeteuk, Heechul, Kang-in, Sungmin, Eunhyuk, Donghae, Siwon, Ryeowook, Kyuhyun
- "Sunny" – Super Junior-Happy
- "Pajama Party" – Super Junior-Happy

Ninth video interlude ("Sorry, Sorry" R&B remix)

- "Sorry, Sorry"
- "Carnival"
- "Sapphire Blue"
- MENT #2
- "Marry U"
- "Wonder boy"
Hong Kong & Mainland China

Super Junior Intro

- "A Man in Love" (Remix ver.)
- "U" (Remix ver.)
- "It's You" (Remix ver.)

First video interlude

- "She Wants It"
- MENT #1
- "Angela"
- "Miracle" (Rock remix)
- "Disco Drive" (Remix ver.)
- "Dancing Out" (Remix ver.)

Second video interlude

- "Baby Baby" – Sungmin
- "Soul" – Heechul (ft. Jungmo on guitar)
- "Beautiful" – Donghae (ft. Eunhyuk)
- "Resignation" – Yesung
- "Betrayal" – Han Geng
- "Insomnia" – Ryeowook
- "Seven Years of Love" – Kyuhyun
- "What if" – Yesung, Sungmin, Ryeowook, Kyuhyun
- "Heartquake" – Yesung, Eunhyuk, Ryeowook, Kyuhyun
- "Honey" – Leeteuk
- "Dance with DOC/Run to you" – Kang-in, Leeteuk, Shindong, Sungmin, Eunhyuk, Donghae

Third video interlude

- "Don't Don" (Remix ver.)
- "Twins (Knock Out)"

Fourth video interlude

- "Our Love"

Fifth video interlude

- Dance off (ft. Han Geng, Shindong, Sungmin, Eunhyuk, Donghae)
- "Who Am I" – Siwon (ft. Ryeowook on keyboard)
- "Blue Tomorrow" – Super Junior-M
- "Super Girl" – Super Junior-M

Sixth video interlude

- "Shining Star"
- "Puff The Magic Dragon - Kyuhyun Feat. Super Junior Members"

Seventh video interlude

- "Superman" (Norazo cover) – Super Junior-T
- "Rokuko" – Super Junior-T

Eighth video interlude - The Secret of "Gee" (featuring Girls' Generation)

- "Gee" (originally by Girls' Generation) – Leeteuk, Heechul, Kang-in, Sungmin, Eunhyuk, Donghae, Siwon, Ryeowook, Kyuhyun
- "Sunny" – Super Junior-Happy
- "Pajama Party" – Super Junior-Happy

Ninth video interlude ("Sorry, Sorry" R&B remix)

- "Sorry, Sorry"
- "Carnival"
- "Sapphire Blue"
- MENT #2
- "Marry U"
- "Wonder Boy"

== Tour dates ==
Date	City	Country	Venue	Attendance
July 17, 2009	Seoul	South Korea	Olympic Fencing Gymnasium	20,000
July 18, 2009	Seoul	South Korea	Olympic Fencing Gymnasium	20,000
July 19, 2009	Seoul	South Korea	Olympic Fencing Gymnasium	20,000
September 18, 2009	Hong Kong	China	AsiaWorld–Arena	—
October 18, 2009	Shanghai	China	Yuanshen Sports Centre Stadium	12,000
November 28, 2009	Bangkok	Thailand	Impact Arena	32,000
November 29, 2009	Bangkok	Thailand	Impact Arena	32,000
December 12, 2009	Nanjing	China	Nanjing Olympic Sports Center Gymnasium	15,000
January 23, 2010	Beijing	China	Wukesong Arena	10,000
February 20, 2010	Taipei	Taiwan	Taipei Arena	—
February 21, 2010	Taipei	Taiwan	Taipei Arena	—
March 6, 2010	Shanghai	China	Shanghai Indoor Stadium	—
March 7, 2010	Shanghai	China	Shanghai Indoor Stadium	—
March 20, 2010	Kuala Lumpur	Malaysia	Putra Indoor Stadium	15,000
April 10, 2010	Quezon City	Philippines	Araneta Coliseum	—
Total				198,000

== Personnel ==
- Vocals/dancers: Super Junior
- Choreographers: Super Junior, Nick Bass, Trent Dickens, Hwang Sanghoon, Shim Jaewon
- Tour organizer: SM Entertainment
  - Overseas organizers: B4H Entertainment (Hong Kong), Pulp Live Productions (Philippines)
- Tour promoter: Dream Maker Entercom, Creazone
  - Overseas promoter(s): Midas Promotions (Hong Kong), True Music (Thailand), Red Star (Malaysia),
- Tour sponsor: Gmarket

== Live album ==
Super Show 2 - Super Junior The 2nd Asia Tour Concert Album
- Super Show 2 - Super Junior The 2nd Asia Tour Concert Album cover

Live album by Super Junior
- Released: December 10, 2009
- Recorded: July 17–19, 2009; Olympic Fencing Gymnasium
- Genre: K-pop, dance, R&B, hip hop, trot
- Language: Korean
- Label: SM Entertainment

Super Junior chronology
Super Show Concert Album (2008)	Super Show 2 - Super Junior The 2nd Asia Tour Concert Album (2009)	Super Show 3 Concert Album (2011)

Super Show 2 - Super Junior The 2nd Asia Tour Concert Album is the second live album of South Korean boy band Super Junior. It was released on December 10, 2009, by SM Entertainment. The album was recorded at their concerts held at the Olympic Fencing Gymnasium in Seoul, South Korea from July 17 to 19, 2009, the first stop of their 2nd Asia Tour – "Super Show 2".

The album includes 35 live tracks and five studio version bonus tracks: remixed version of "Sorry, sorry", R&B ballad "Sorry Sorry-Answer", re-arranged versions of "It's You" and "Shining Star" as well as classic pop track "Puff The Magic Dragon". "Sorry, Sorry-Answer" and "It's You" were also released online at Melon, Dosirak, and Cyworld before the album's release. A music video of "Sorry Sorry-Answer", was also released on December 10 in celebration of the live album. "Sorry, Sorry - Answer", peaked at number one for 2 weeks on the MYX international countdown.

The album was also released in Taiwan by Avex Taiwan on January 15, 2010. It debuted at number one on Taiwan's G-Music Weekly G-Music J-Pop/K-Pop Chart with percentage sales of 44.69%.

=== Track listing ===
CD 1

1. "A Man In Love" (5:35)
2. "U" (4:07)
3. "It's You" (Rearranged) (4:07)
4. "She Wants It" (3:58)
5. "Angela" (3:17)
6. "Miracle" (Rearranged) (2:38)
7. "Disco Drive" (Rearranged) (3:48)
8. "Dancing Out" (Rearranged) (3:14)
9. "Baby Baby" (Sungmin) (2:36)
10. "Hon" (Soul) (Heechul) (2:38)
11. "Beautiful" (Donghae) (3:04)
12. "Chenyeom" (Yesung) (3:12)
13. "Insomnia" (Ryeowook) (2:54)
14. "7 Nyeonganui Sarang" (7 Years of Love) (Kyuhyun) (5:31)
15. "What If" (3:24)
16. "Heartquake" (4:11)
17. "Honey" (Leeteuk) (2:27)
18. "Doc wa chumeul" + "Run to you" (Kangin) (3:40)
19. "Don't Don" (4:20)
20. "Twins (Knock Out)" (3:22)

CD 2

1. "Our Love" (Rearranged) (3:47)
2. "Who Am I" (Siwon) (3:27)
3. "Dangshinikie" (At Least I Still Have You) (4:18)
4. "Me" (3:59)
5. "Shining Star" (Rearranged) (4:21)
6. "Sorry Sorry" - Remix (4:46)
7. "Syupeomaen" (SuperMan) (3:24)
8. "Rokuko" (2:57)
9. "Gee" (3:24)
10. "Kkuldanji" (Sunny) (Rearranged) (3:06)
11. "Pajama Party" (Rearranged) (3:24)
12. "Carnival" (3:26)
13. "Sowoni Innayo" (Sapphire Blue) (2:58)
14. "Marry U" (3:18)
15. "Sorry, Sorry - Answer" (studio version) (4:58)
16. "Sorry, sorry" - Remix (studio version) (4:48)
17. "It's You" (Rearranged) (studio version) (4:08)
18. "Puff the Magic Dragon" (studio version) (3:35)
19. "Shining Star" (Rearranged) (studio version) (4:22)

=== Charts ===
Country	Chart	Period	Peak position	Sales
Taiwan	G-Music J-Pop/K-Pop Chart	January 15–21, 2010 (week 3)	1	44.69%
