= List of awards and nominations received by Super Junior =

Super Junior awards and nominations
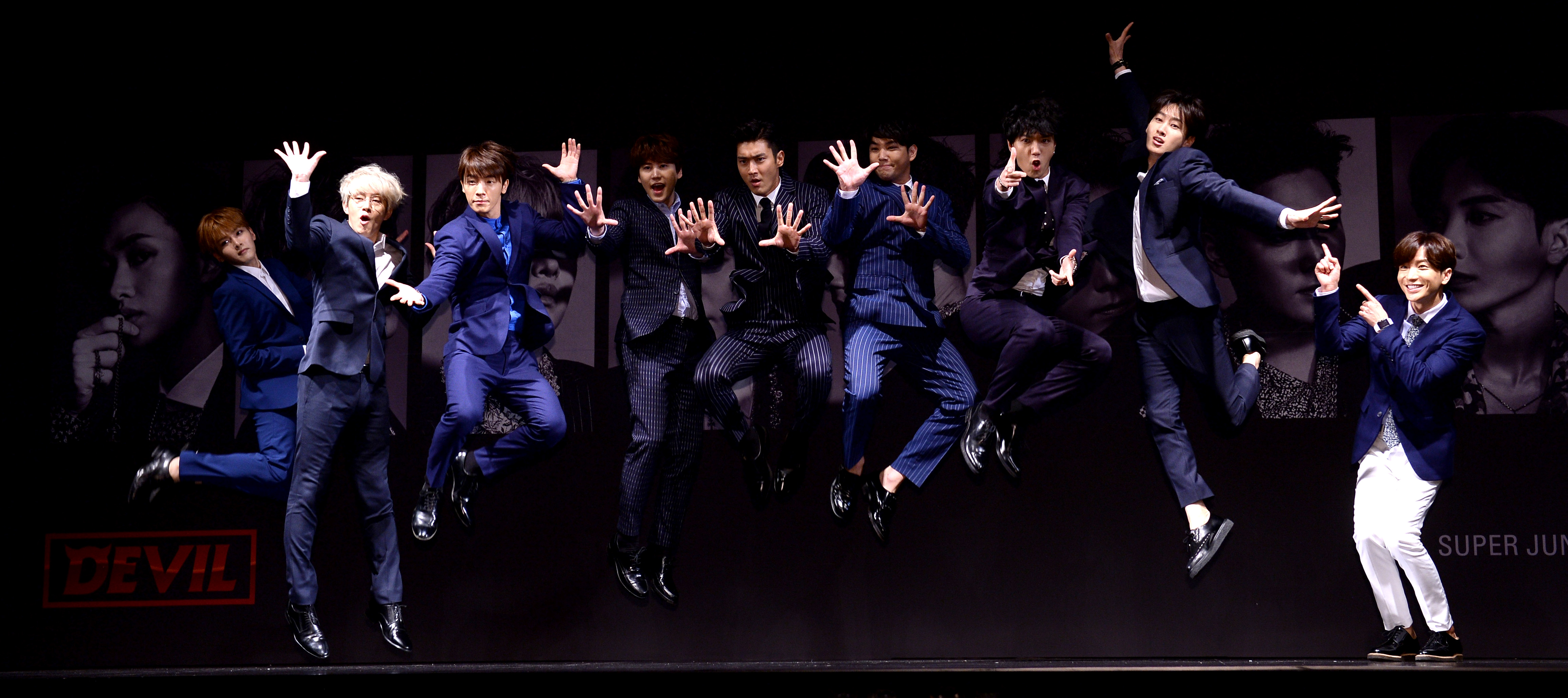
- Super Junior at COEX Artium in 2015
Awards and nominations
Award	Wins	Nominations
Anugerah Bintang Popular Berita Harian	1	2
ASAP Pop Viewers' Choice Awards	1	1
Asia Artist Awards	5	7
Asia Model Awards	1	1
Asia Song Festival	3	3
Bang Awards	2	2
Bugs Music Awards	1	1
E! People's Choice Awards	0	2
Edaily Culture Awards	0	1
Gaon Chart Awards	2	2
Gaon Chart Music Awards	6	8
Global Chinese Golden Chart Awards	1	1
Golden Disc Awards	20	28
Golden Melody Awards	2	2
Hito Music Awards	1	1
Hollywood Music Awards	1	1
Hong Kong Top Sales Music Awards	7	7
Huading Awards	1	1
Idol Awards	0	1
iF Product Design Award	1	1
International 3D Festival	1	1
J'Fest Awards	0	1
KKBox Music Awards	4	4
Korea Best Dresser Swan Awards	2	2
Korea in Motion Festival	1	1
Korea Popular Music Awards	1	1
Korean Culture & Entertainment Awards	0	1
Korean Entertainment and Arts Awards	4	4
Korean Popular Entertainment Awards	2	2
Korean Wave–China Awards	1	1
Latin Italian Music Awards	1	1
MAMA Awards	14	35
Mashable Awards	4	4
MBC Entertainment Awards	1	1
Melon Music Awards	5	11
Mnet 20's Choice Awards	4	7
MTN Broadcast Advertising Festival	1	1
MTV Asia Awards	1	1
MTV Europe Music Awards	0	1
MTV Italy Awards	1	2
MTV MIAW Awards	0	4
MTV Video Music Awards Japan	0	1
Myx Music Awards	3	3
Nickelodeon Mexico Kids' Choice Awards	1	1
Premios Luces	1	1
Red Dot Design Awards	1	1
SBS Gayo Daejeon	1	2
SBS MTV Best of the Best	2	7
SEED Awards	3	4
Seoul Music Awards	15	29
Singapore's e-Awards	7	8
Southeast Music Chart Awards	0	1
Style Icon Awards	1	1
Teen Choice Awards	2	5
Telehit Awards	1	2
Tencent Starlight Festival	1	1
The Fact Music Awards	14	15
Tower Records Japan K-pop Lovers Awards	5	5
V Chart Awards	4	4
Weibo Starlight Awards	0	1
World Music Awards	1	4
Yahoo! Asia Buzz Awards	8	8
You2Play Awards	2	2
YouTube K-Pop Awards	1	1

Totals (Note: Certain award groups do not simply award one winner. They acknowledge several different recipients, have runners-up, and have third place. Since this is a specific recognition and is different from losing an award, runner-up mentions are considered wins in this award tally. For simplification and to avoid errors, each award in this list has been presumed to have had a prior nomination.)
- Wins: 174
- Nominations: 264

This is a list of awards and nominations received by Super Junior, a South Korean boy band formed in 2005 by SM Entertainment. Super Junior has won numerous awards and recognitions since their K-pop debut in 2005, their introduction to the Mandopop industry in 2007 and to the J-pop industry in 2011. Super Junior won most of their awards in South Korea, but they have also won many awards and nominations globally. The group has recorded ten studio albums and seven CD singles, but they have released a total of 20 different kinds of records, including featurings and sub-unit recordings.

The band's most successful song is U, which earned Super Junior their first music award, the SBS Popular Songs Mutizen Song in June 2006. The single earned the band four more distinctive song awards, and the band grabbed their first MKMF award from the Mnet/KM Music Festival in November 2006. In terms of recognition in other areas of Asia, Super Junior is the first overseas artist to win Asia's Artist of the Year at the Tencent Stars Magnificent Ceremony in China, and is also the second musical group to win Favorite Artist Korea at the MTV Asia Awards, after jtL in 2003. Super Junior have earned 20 music awards at the Golden Disc Awards, 13 at the Mnet Asian Music Awards and 13 at the Seoul Music Awards. Super Junior is the first Asian artist who won International Artist at the 2015 Teen Choice Awards.

Super Junior won Legend Award a special title at the Asia Artist Awards in November 2017 and also won Top of K-Pop Record in November 2019 due to their prominent contributions in Korean Wave, leading K-pop to its current state of global awareness. In January 2019, the band won "Artist of the Year Award" at the 14th KKBOX Music Awards in Taiwan and became the first non-Chinese artist to receive it.

Super Junior have also gained recognition for their dress style and fashion throughout their career. They hailed as the best-dressed artist at the 2007 Summer Break 20's Choice Awards, and also earned a similar nomination the following year. The group have also earned titles for their dance choreography and popularity.

== Awards and nominations ==
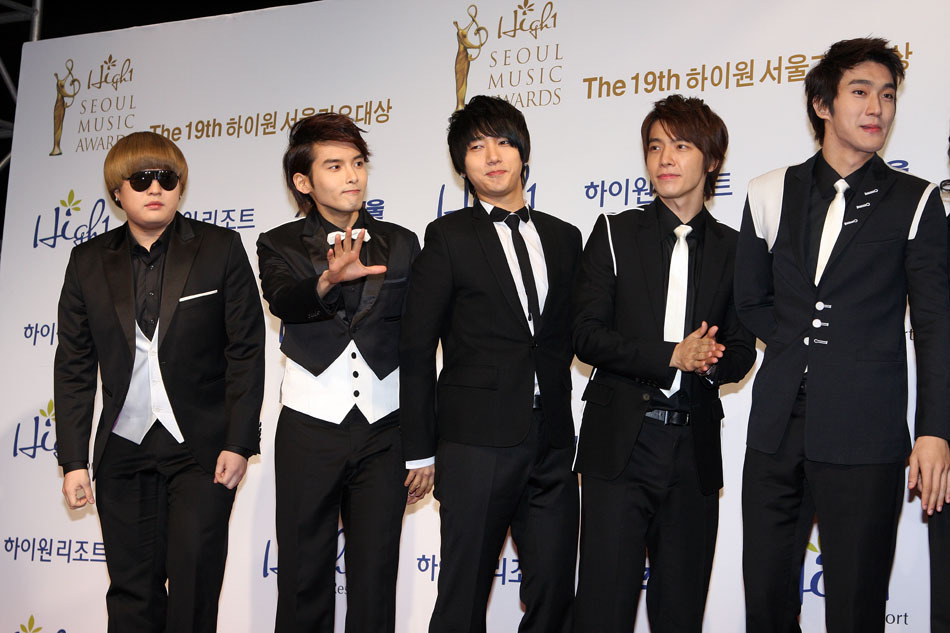
Super Junior at the 19th Seoul Music Awards in 2010

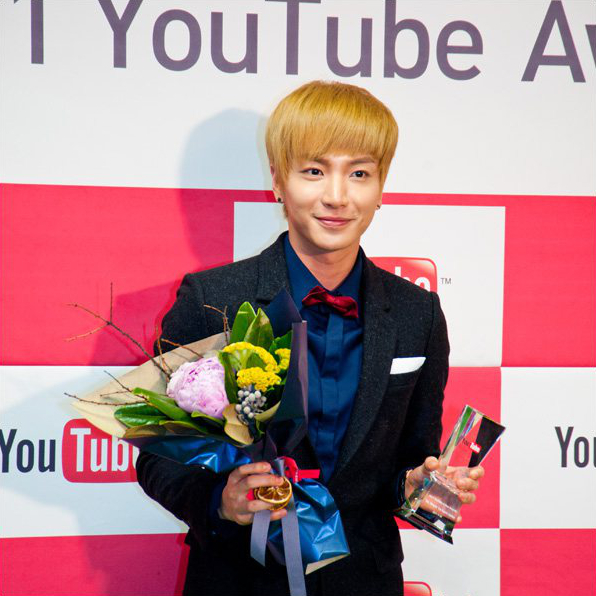
Leeteuk, a member of Super Junior at the 2011 YouTube K-Pop Awards

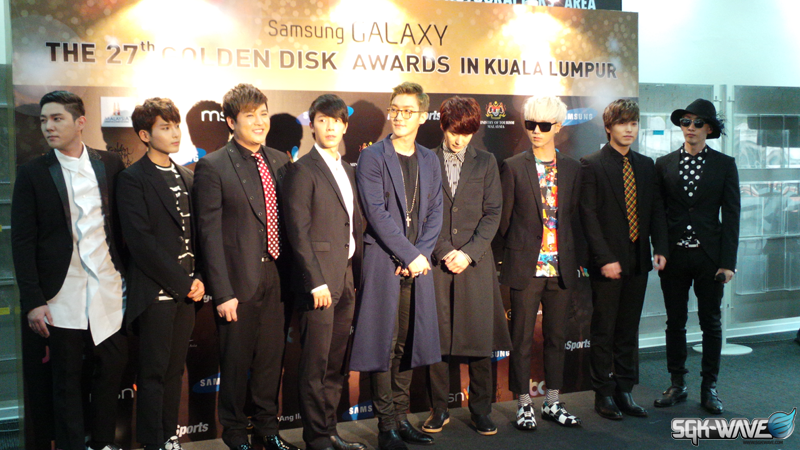
Super Junior at the 27th Golden Disc Awards in 2013

Name of the award ceremony, year presented, nominee(s) of the award, award category, and the result of the nomination
Award ceremony	Year	Category	Nominee/work	Result	Ref.
Anugerah Bintang Popular Berita Harian	2012	Most Popular Asian Celebrity	Super Junior	Won	
Anugerah Bintang Popular Berita Harian	2013	Most Popular Asian Celebrity	Super Junior	Nominated	
ASAP Pop Viewers' Choice Awards	2010	Pop K-pop	Super Junior	Won	
Asia Artist Awards	2016	Most Popular Artists (Singer)	Super Junior	Nominated	
Asia Artist Awards	2017	Most Popular Artists (Singer)	Super Junior	Nominated	
Asia Artist Awards	2017	AAA Fabulous Award	Super Junior	Won	
Asia Artist Awards	2017	Legend Award	Super Junior	Won	
Asia Artist Awards	2019	Dongnam Media & FPT Polytechnic Award	Super Junior	Won	
Asia Artist Awards	2019	Top of K-pop Record	Super Junior	Won	
Asia Artist Awards	2020	History of Songs Award	Super Junior	Won	
Asia Model Awards	2008	Entertainment: Asia Special Award	Super Junior	Won	
Asia Song Festival	2007	Appreciation Award	Super Junior	Won	
Asia Song Festival	2009	Asian Best Singer Award	Super Junior	Won	
Asia Song Festival	2011	Asian Best Singer Award	Super Junior	Won	
Bang Awards	2012	Favorite Asian Idol	Super Junior	Won	
Bang Awards	2013	Favorite Asian Idol	Super Junior	Won	
Bugs Music Awards	2009	Song of the Year	"Sorry, Sorry"	Won	
E! People's Choice Awards	2018	The Group of 2018	Super Junior	Nominated	
E! People's Choice Awards	2018	The Concert Tour of 2018	Super Show 7	Nominated	
Edaily Culture Awards	2014	Concert category	Super Show	Nominated	
Gaon Chart Awards	2010	Album of The Year	Sorry, Sorry	Won	
Gaon Chart Awards	2011	Top Selling Album of 2010	Bonamana	Won	
Gaon Chart Music Awards	2012	Album of the Year – 3rd Quarter	Mr. Simple	Won	
Gaon Chart Music Awards	2013	Album of the Year – 3rd Quarter	Sexy, Free & Single	Won	
Gaon Chart Music Awards	2015	Album of the Year – 3rd Quarter	Mamacita	Won	
Gaon Chart Music Awards	2015	Album of the Year – 4th Quarter	This Is Love	Won	
Gaon Chart Music Awards	2015	Gaon Chart Weibo Kpop Star Award	Super Junior	Won	
Gaon Chart Music Awards	2016	Album of the Year – 3rd Quarter	Devil	Won	
Gaon Chart Music Awards	2016	Popular Singer of the Year	Super Junior	Nominated	
Gaon Chart Music Awards	2020	Album of the Year – 4th Quarter	Time Slip	Nominated	
Global Chinese Golden Chart Awards	2011	Best Japanese and Korean Album of The Year	Bonamana	Won	
Golden Disc Awards	2006	Rookie of the Year	"Twins"	Won	
Golden Disc Awards	2006	Popular Music Video Award	"U"	Won	
Golden Disc Awards	2007	Disk Daesang	Don't Don	Nominated	
Golden Disc Awards	2007	Disk Bonsang	Don't Don	Won	
Golden Disc Awards	2007	TPL Anycall Popularity Award	Super Junior	Won	
Golden Disc Awards	2009	Disk Daesang	Sorry, Sorry	Won	
Golden Disc Awards	2009	Disk Bonsang	Sorry, Sorry	Won	
Golden Disc Awards	2009	Samsung YEPP Popularity Award	Super Junior	Won	
Golden Disc Awards	2010	Disk Daesang	Bonamana	Nominated	
Golden Disc Awards	2010	Disk Bonsang	Bonamana	Won	
Golden Disc Awards	2010	Popularity Award	Super Junior	Nominated	
Golden Disc Awards	2010	Asian Popularity Award	Super Junior	Won	
Golden Disc Awards	2012	Disk Daesang	Mr. Simple	Won	
Golden Disc Awards	2012	Disk Bonsang	Mr. Simple	Won	
Golden Disc Awards	2012	Popularity Award	Super Junior	Won	
Golden Disc Awards	2012	MSN Japan Popularity Award	Super Junior	Won	
Golden Disc Awards	2013	Disk Daesang	Sexy, Free & Single	Won	
Golden Disc Awards	2013	Disk Bonsang	Sexy, Free & Single	Won	
Golden Disc Awards	2013	MSN Southeast Asian Award	Super Junior	Won	
Golden Disc Awards	2014	Disk Daesang	Mamacita	Nominated	
Golden Disc Awards	2014	Disk Bonsang	Mamacita	Won	
Golden Disc Awards	2015	Disk Daesang	Devil	Nominated	
Golden Disc Awards	2015	Disk Bonsang	Devil	Won	
Golden Disc Awards	2018	Disk Daesang	Play	Nominated	
Golden Disc Awards	2018	Disk Bonsang	Play	Won	
Golden Disc Awards	2020	Disk Daesang	Time Slip	Nominated	
Golden Disc Awards	2020	Disk Bonsang	Time Slip	Won	
Golden Disc Awards	2022	Disk Bonsang	The Renaissance	Nominated	
Golden Melody Awards	2007	Best Group	Super Junior	Won	
Golden Melody Awards	2007	Best Performance Album	Super Junior	Won	
Hito Music Awards	2012	JKpop Song of The Year	"Mr. Simple"	Won	
Hong Kong Top Sales Music Award	2011	Best Sales Releases (Japanese and Korean)	ACHA	Won	
Hong Kong Top Sales Music Award	2012	Best Sales Releases (Japanese and Korean)	Sexy, Free & Single	Won	
Hong Kong Top Sales Music Award	2012	Best Sales Releases (Japanese and Korean)	Super Show 3 DVD	Won	
Hong Kong Top Sales Music Award	2013	Best Sales Releases (Japanese and Korean)	Super Show 4 DVD	Won	
Hong Kong Top Sales Music Award	2014	Best Sales Releases (Japanese and Korean)	Mamacita	Won	
Hong Kong Top Sales Music Award	2014	Best Sales Releases (Japanese and Korean)	This Is Love	Won	
Hong Kong Top Sales Music Award	2015	Best Sales Releases (Japanese and Korean)	Super Show 5 DVD	Won	
Huading Awards	2015	Global Best Group	Super Junior	Won	
Idol Awards	2009	Best Idol group	Super Junior	Nominated	
iF Product Design Award	2016	Discipline Packaging	This Is Love	Won	
International 3D Festival (I3DF)	2012	Work of Art Award	Super Show 4 Concert in 3D	Won	
KKBox Music Awards	2012	Best Korean Singer of the Year	Super Junior	Won	
KKBox Music Awards	2013	Best Korean Artist	Super Junior	Won	
KKBox Music Awards	2015	Best Korean Artist	Super Junior	Won	
KKBox Music Awards	2019	Artist of the Year	Super Junior	Won	
Korea Best Dresser Swan Awards	2007	Best Dressed Singer	Super Junior	Won	
Korea Best Dresser Swan Awards	2011	Best Dressed Singer	Super Junior	Won	
Korea in Motion Festival	2011	Most Popular Music	"Mr. Simple"	Won	
Korea Popular Music Awards	2018	Hallyu Performance Award	Super Junior	Won	
Korean Entertainment and Arts Awards	2006	Best Group	Super Junior	Won	
Korean Entertainment and Arts Awards	2007	Best Male Dance Group Awards	Don't Don	Won	
Korean Entertainment and Arts Awards	2008	Special Award	Super Junior	Won	
Korean Entertainment and Arts Awards	2012	Best Artist Group	Super Junior	Won	
Korean Popular Entertainment Awards	2007	New Generation Artist of the Year	Super Junior	Won	
Korean Popular Entertainment Awards	2007	Top Artist	Super Junior	Won	
Korean Wave–China Awards	2006	10 Most Popular Group	Super Junior	Won	
Latin Music Italian Awards	2015	International Male Artist	Super Junior	Won	
MAMA Awards (Note: In 2009, Super Junior's label, SM Entertainment and Inwoo Production boycotted the 2009 Mnet Asian Music Awards. SM stated that they have reservation regarding the standard of fairness and criteria used in their selections, citing that Girls' Generation had topped Korean music charts for nine consecutive weeks but was never placed first on Mnet's music show, and only debuted on their charts a month after the album was released. They also asked that their artists to be remove from a mobile poll which requires participants to pay fees in order to vote, saying they "do not want to see fans suffer any damage from the poll which has commercial intentions".)	2006	Best New Group	"U"	Won	
MAMA Awards	2006	Best Dance Performance	"U"	Nominated	
MAMA Awards	2007	Artist of the Year	Super Junior	Won	
MAMA Awards	2007	Auction Netizen Popularity	Super Junior	Won	
MAMA Awards	2007	Mobile Popularity	Super Junior	Won	
MAMA Awards	2007	Best Male Group	Super Junior	Nominated	
MAMA Awards	2007	Best Dance Performance	"Don't Don"	Nominated	
MAMA Awards	2009	Best Male Group	Super Junior	Nominated	
MAMA Awards	2009	Mobile Popularity Awards	Super Junior	Won	
MAMA Awards	2009	Netizen Popularity Awards	Super Junior	Won	
MAMA Awards	2009	Overseas Viewers Awards	Super Junior	Won	
MAMA Awards	2009	Best Dance Performance	"Sorry, Sorry"	Nominated	
MAMA Awards	2010	Album of the Year	Bonamana	Nominated	
MAMA Awards	2010	Best Dance Performance – Male	"Bonamana"	Nominated	
MAMA Awards	2010	Best Male Group	Super Junior	Nominated	
MAMA Awards	2011	Album of the Year	Mr. Simple	Won	
MAMA Awards	2011	Best Male Group	Super Junior	Won	
MAMA Awards	2011	Singapore's Choice Award	Super Junior	Won	
MAMA Awards	2011	Best Dance Performance – Male Group	"Mr. Simple"	Nominated	
MAMA Awards	2012	Album of the Year	Sexy, Free & Single	Won	
MAMA Awards	2012	Song of the Year	"Sexy, Free & Single"	Nominated	
MAMA Awards	2012	Artist of the Year	Super Junior	Nominated	
MAMA Awards	2012	Best Global Group – Male	Super Junior	Won	
MAMA Awards	2012	Best Male Group	Super Junior	Nominated	
MAMA Awards	2012	Best Line Award	Super Junior	Won	
MAMA Awards	2012	Best Dance Performance – Male	"Sexy, Free & Single"	Nominated	
MAMA Awards	2014	Album of the Year	Mamacita	Nominated	
MAMA Awards	2014	Artist of the Year	Mamacita	Nominated	
MAMA Awards	2014	Best Male Group	Super Junior	Nominated	
MAMA Awards	2015	Album of the Year	Devil	Nominated	
MAMA Awards	2015	Artist of the Year	Devil	Nominated	
MAMA Awards	2015	Best Male Group	Super Junior	Nominated	
MAMA Awards	2021	Worldwide Fans' Choice Top 10	Super Junior	Nominated	
MAMA Awards	2023	Worldwide Fans' Choice Top 10	Super Junior	Nominated	
MAMA Awards	2025	Inspiring Achievement	Super Junior	Won	
Mashable Awards	2010	Must Follow Personality	Super Junior	Won	
Mashable Awards	2011	Viral Video of the Year	Mr. Simple	Won	
Mashable Awards	2011	Must Follow Musician on Social Media	Super Junior	Won	
Mashable Awards	2011	Best Mobile Game	Super Junior SHAKE	Won	
MBC Entertainment Awards	2011	Special Award (Singer Division)	Super Junior	Won	
Melon Music Awards	2006	Rookie of the Year	Super Junior	Won	
Melon Music Awards	2009	Daesang Award	Sorry, Sorry	Nominated	
Melon Music Awards	2009	Song of the Year (Digital Daesang)	Sorry, Sorry	Nominated	
Melon Music Awards	2009	Top 10 Artist Winners (Bonsang)	Sorry, Sorry	Won	
Melon Music Awards	2009	Star of the Year	Super Junior	Nominated	
Melon Music Awards	2009	Mania of the Year	Super Junior	Nominated	
Melon Music Awards	2010	Netizen Popularity Award	Super Junior	Won	
Melon Music Awards	2011	Daesang Award	Mr. Simple	Nominated	
Melon Music Awards	2011	Top 10 Artist Winners (Bonsang)	Mr. Simple	Won	
Melon Music Awards	2011	Netizen Popularity Award	Super Junior	Won	
Melon Music Awards	2012	Global Star Award	Super Junior	Nominated	
Mnet 20's Choice Awards	2007	Blue Carpet Award	Super Junior	Won	
Mnet 20's Choice Awards	2007	Popular Group Singer	Super Junior	Won	
Mnet 20's Choice Awards	2007	Best Performer	Super Junior	Won	
Mnet 20's Choice Awards	2008	Hot Trend Musician	Super Junior	Nominated	
Mnet 20's Choice Awards	2009	Hot On-line Song	"Sorry, Sorry"	Nominated	
Mnet 20's Choice Awards	2009	Hot Performer	Super Junior	Nominated	
Mnet 20's Choice Awards	2012	20's Global Star	Super Junior	Won	
MTN Broadcast Advertising Festival	2010	Best Advertisement Model	Super Junior	Won	
MTV Asia Awards	2008	Korea's Most Popular Artist	Super Junior	Won	
MTV Europe Music Awards	2012	Best Asian Act	Super Junior	Nominated	
MTV Italy Awards	2013	Artist Saga	Super Junior	Nominated	
MTV Italy Awards	2014	Best Artist From The World	Super Junior	Won	
MTV MIAW Awards	2018	K-Pop Revolution	Super Junior	Nominated	
MTV MIAW Awards	2019	K-Pop Explosion	Super Junior	Nominated	
MTV MIAW Awards	2022	K-Pop Domination	Super Junior	Nominated	
MTV MIAW Awards	2023	K-Pop Domination	Super Junior	Pending	
MTV Video Music Awards Japan	2007	Best Buzz - South Korea	"U"	Nominated	
Myx Music Awards	2012	Favorite K-Pop Video	"Mr. Simple"	Won	
Myx Music Awards	2013	Favorite K-Pop Video	"Sexy, Free & Single"	Won	
Myx Music Awards	2018	International Video of the Year	"Black Suit"	Won	
Nickelodeon Mexico Kids' Choice Awards	2018	Best Collaboration	"Lo Siento" (ft. Leslie Grace, Play-N-Skillz)	Won	
Premios Luces	2019	Best Concert	Super Show 7	Won	
Red Dot Design Award	2014	Communication Design Award	Mr. Simple	Won	
SBS Gayo Daejeon	2006	Rookie of the Year	Super Junior	Won	
SBS Gayo Daejeon	2006	Top Artists	Super Junior	Nominated	
SBS MTV Best of the Best	2011	Best Rival (Live)	Super Junior vs Big Bang	Won	
SBS MTV Best of the Best	2011	Artist of the Year	Super Junior	Nominated	
SBS MTV Best of the Best	2011	Best Male Group	Super Junior	Nominated	
SBS MTV Best of the Best	2012	Best Global Video	Super Junior	Won	
SBS MTV Best of the Best	2012	Best Group Male	Super Junior	Nominated	
SBS MTV Best of the Best	2012	Artist of the Year	Super Junior	Won	
SBS MTV Best of the Best	2014	Best Male Group	Super Junior	Nominated	
SEED Awards	2007	Best New Asian Artist	Super Junior	Won	
SEED Awards	2008	Asia's Most Popular Artist	Super Junior	Nominated	
SEED Awards	2010	Best Asian Artist	Super Junior	Won	
SEED Awards	2011	Popular Asia Artist of The Year	Super Junior	Won	
Seoul Music Awards	2006	Rookie of the Year	Super Junior	Won	
Seoul Music Awards	2006	Mobile Popularity	Super Junior	Won	
Seoul Music Awards	2008	Daesang Award	Don't Don	Nominated	
Seoul Music Awards	2008	Bonsang Award	Don't Don	Won	
Seoul Music Awards	2008	Mobile Popularity	Super Junior	Won	
Seoul Music Awards	2010	Daesang Award	Sorry Sorry	Nominated	
Seoul Music Awards	2010	Bonsang Award	Sorry Sorry	Won	
Seoul Music Awards	2010	Mobile Popularity	Super Junior	Won	
Seoul Music Awards	2010	Hallyu Special Award	Super Junior	Won	
Seoul Music Awards	2011	Bonsang Award	Bonamana	Nominated	
Seoul Music Awards	2011	Popularity Award	Super Junior	Nominated	
Seoul Music Awards	2012	Daesang Award	Mr. Simple	Won	
Seoul Music Awards	2012	Bonsang Award	Mr. Simple	Won	
Seoul Music Awards	2012	Popularity Award	Super Junior	Nominated	
Seoul Music Awards	2013	Daesang Award	Sexy, Free & Single	Nominated	
Seoul Music Awards	2013	Bonsang Award	Sexy, Free & Single	Won	
Seoul Music Awards	2013	Hallyu Special Award	Super Junior	Won	
Seoul Music Awards	2015	Daesang Award	Mamacita	Nominated	
Seoul Music Awards	2015	Bonsang Award	Mamacita	Won	
Seoul Music Awards	2018	Daesang Award	Play	Nominated	
Seoul Music Awards	2018	Bonsang Award	Play	Won	
Seoul Music Awards	2018	Popularity Award	Super Junior	Nominated	
Seoul Music Awards	2018	Hallyu Special Award	Super Junior	Nominated	
Seoul Music Awards	2020	Daesang Award	Time Slip	Nominated	
Seoul Music Awards	2020	Bonsang Award	Time Slip	Won	
Seoul Music Awards	2020	Popularity Award	Super Junior	Nominated	
Seoul Music Awards	2020	K-Wave Award	Super Junior	Nominated	
Seoul Music Awards	2020	QQ Music Most Popular K-Pop Artist Award	Super Junior	Nominated	
Seoul Music Awards	2023	Daesang Award	The Road: Winter for Spring	Pending	
Seoul Music Awards	2023	Bonsang Award	The Road: Winter for Spring	Pending	
Seoul Music Awards	2023	Popularity Award	Super Junior	Pending	
Seoul Music Awards	2023	K-wave Award	Super Junior	Pending	
Seoul Music Awards	2026	K-Pop World Choice (Group)	Super Junior	Won	
Singapore's e-Awards	2012	Most Popular 'U-Weekly' Cover	Super Junior	Won	
Singapore's e-Awards	2012	Most Popular Korea Artist	Super Junior	Won	
Singapore's e-Awards	2012	Most Popular Group	Super Junior	Won	
Singapore's e-Awards	2013	Most Popular Music Video (K-pop)	"Sexy, Free & Single"	Won	
Singapore's e-Awards	2013	Most Popular Korean Singer	Super Junior	Won	
Singapore's e-Awards	2013	Most Popular 'U-Weekly' Cover	Super Junior	Nominated	
Singapore's e-Awards	2014	Most Popular Korean Singer	Super Junior	Won	
Singapore's e-Awards	2014	Most Popular 'U-Weekly' Cover	Super Junior	Won	
Southeast Music Chart Awards	2007	Most Popular Overseas Group	Super Junior	Nominated	
Style Icon Awards	2012	Top 10 Style Icon	Super Junior	Won	
Teen Choice Awards	2015	Choice International Artist	Super Junior	Won	
Teen Choice Awards	2015	Choice Fandom	Super Junior	Won	
Teen Choice Awards	2016	Choice International Artist	Super Junior	Nominated	
Teen Choice Awards	2016	Choice Fandom	Super Junior	Nominated	
Teen Choice Awards	2018	Choice International Artist	Super Junior	Nominated	
Telehit Awards	2018	Special Award	Super Junior	Won	
Telehit Awards	2019	Best K-pop of the Year	Super Junior	Nominated	
Tencent Starlight Festival	2007	Asia's Artist of the Year	Super Junior	Won	
The Fact Music Awards	2019	Fan N Star Choice Award	Super Junior	Won	
The Fact Music Awards	2019	Fan N Star Most Votes Award	Super Junior	Won	
The Fact Music Awards	2019	Fan N Star Hall of Fame	Super Junior	Won	
The Fact Music Awards	2020 (Note: The award ceremony for 2019 The Fact Music Award which was originally scheduled to be held on 29 February 2020 was cancelled due to the COVID-19 pandemic. Subsequently, the winners were announced on the award's website on 16 March 2020.)	Artist of the year	Super Junior	Won	
The Fact Music Awards	2020	Worldwide Icon	Super Junior	Won	
The Fact Music Awards	2020	Fan N Star Choice Singer	Super Junior	Won	
The Fact Music Awards	2020	Fan N Star Largest Vote Singer	Super Junior	Won	
The Fact Music Awards	2020 (Note: The award ceremony for 2020 The Fact Music Awards is held on 12 December 2020.)	Artist of The Year	Super Junior	Won	
The Fact Music Awards	2020	TMA Popularity Award	Super Junior	Won	
The Fact Music Awards	2020	Fan N Star Choice Award Singer	Super Junior	Won	
The Fact Music Awards	2020	Fan N Star Most Voted Singer	Super Junior	Won	
The Fact Music Awards	2021	Artist of the Year	Super Junior	Won	
The Fact Music Awards	2021	Fan N Star Choice Award (Group)	Super Junior	Won	
The Fact Music Awards	2021	Worldwide Icon	Super Junior	Won	
The Fact Music Awards	2021	Best ADs Award	Super Junior	Nominated	
Tower Records Japan K-pop Lovers Awards	2011	Artist of the year	Super Junior	3rd Place	
Tower Records Japan K-pop Lovers Awards	2011	Album of the year	Mr. Simple	3rd Place	
Tower Records Japan K-pop Lovers Awards	2012	Album of the year	Sexy, Free & Single	Won	
Tower Records Japan K-pop Lovers Awards	2012	Single of the year	Sexy, Free & Single	3rd Place	
Tower Records Japan K-pop Lovers Awards	2012	Artist of the year	Super Junior	Runner-up	
V Chart Awards	2013	Best Korean Group	Super Junior	Won	
V Chart Awards	2013	Favorite Korean Artist of the Year	Super Junior	Won	
V Chart Awards	2014	Best Korean Group	Super Junior	Won	
V Chart Awards	2014	Favorite Korean Artist of the Year	Super Junior	Won	
Weibo Starlight Awards	2019	Weibo Starlight Group	Super Junior	Nominated	
World Music Awards	2012	World's Best Group	Super Junior	Nominated	
World Music Awards	2013	World's Best Group	Super Junior	Nominated	
World Music Awards	2013	Best Live Act	Super Junior	Won	
World Music Awards	2014	World's Best Group	Super Junior	Nominated	
Yahoo! Asia Buzz Awards	2010	Top Buzz Overseas Group	Super Junior	Won	
Yahoo! Asia Buzz Awards	2011	Taiwan's Top Searched Group	Super Junior	Won	
Yahoo! Asia Buzz Awards	2011	Hong Kong's Top Searched Group	Super Junior	Won	
Yahoo! Asia Buzz Awards	2011	Korea's Top Searched Group	Super Junior	Won	
Yahoo! Asia Buzz Awards	2011	Asia's Top Searched Group	Super Junior	Won	
Yahoo! Asia Buzz Awards	2012	Asia's Top Searched Group Artists	Super Junior	Won	
Yahoo! Asia Buzz Awards	2012	Hong Kong's Top Searched Artists	Super Junior	Won	
Yahoo! Asia Buzz Awards	2012	Korea's Top Searched Group Artists	Super Junior	Won	
You2Play Awards	2013	Favorite Asian Artist	Super Junior	Won	
You2Play Awards	2013	Favorite Asian Music Video	Sexy, Free & Single	Won	
YouTube K-Pop Awards	2011	Most Viewed Video of The Year	"Mr. Simple"	Won	

== Other accolades ==
=== State and cultural honors ===
Name of country or organization, year given and name of honor or award
Country or organization	Year	Honor/Award	Ref.
China	2009	Medal of Appreciation	(Note: Awarded at the 11th Shanghai International Art Festival)
South Korea	2010	Minister of Culture, Sports and Tourism Commendation	(Note: Awarded at the Korean Popular Culture and Arts Awards)
South Korea	2026	Presidential Commendation	

=== Listicles ===
Name of publisher, year listed, name of listicle and placement
Publisher	Year	Listicle	Placement	Ref.
The Dong-a Ilbo	2016	Best Male Artists According to Experts	7th	
Forbes	2011	Korea Power Celebrity	16th	
Forbes	2012	Korea Power Celebrity	16th	
Forbes	2013	Korea Power Celebrity	10th	
Forbes	2015	Korea Power Celebrity	24th	
LiveAbout	2018	Top 30 Boy Bands of All Time	Placed	
