= Super Show =

2008–09 concert tour by Super Junior

- Asia tour by Super Junior
- Promotional poster for the tour
- Location: South Korea; Thailand; China
- Associated album: Twins; Don't Don
- Start date: February 22, 2008
- End date: March 7, 2009
- Legs: 3
- No. of shows: 10
- Guests: Xmas of TraxX
- Supporting act: Zhang Liyin
- Attendance: 86,000
- Website: superjunior.smtown.com

Super Junior concert chronology
- Super Show (2008–09); Super Show 2 (2009–10)

The Super Show was the first Asia-wide live concert tour by South Korean boy band, Super Junior. The tour commenced five months after the release of the group's second studio album, Don't Don. The concert covers most songs from the group's first two studio albums, including their hit single, "U," and also subgroup hits from Super Junior-K.R.Y., Super Junior-T, and Super Junior-M. The tour kicked off with three stops in South Korea and expanded its routes to Thailand and China.

== History ==
The Super Show Tour is the first Asia-wide concert tour by Super Junior since their debut in November 2005. The tour was first announced in January, four months after the release of their second studio album, Don't Don. 13,000 tickets for the concert in Seoul, South Korea were placed for auction online on January 22, 2008. As soon as the auction began at 5:00 PM, over 120,000 fans simultaneously loaded onto the site and crashed the server. As soon as the server was back in commission, all 13,000 tickets were sold out in 18 minutes. A second ticket auction occurred on January 28 at 8:00 PM for the remaining seats and was just as successful. Due to the success of the sales, the organizers decided to add an extra show on February 22, and the corresponding tickets were all sold out in five minutes.

The tour reached Bangkok, Thailand on July 12, 2008, and Shanghai on November 22, 2008. A portion of the tickets for Shanghai's concert were scalped for over ¥7 thousand. Two encore concerts were held in Seoul on the first weekend of January 2009 and two weeks later, the concert was held in Nanjing, China. Super Junior became the first Korean artist to hold a solo concert in Nanjing, having their tickets being scalped for ¥6 thousand. The Super Show Tour also broke the record for being the first concert ever in China to have a "standing" stage.

Super Show was also expected to tour Hong Kong, Taipei (Taiwan), and Tokyo (Japan), but due to schedule conflicts, the tour was unable to go to those cities. The last stop for Super Show was in Chengdu (China)in March 2009.

The live Super Show Tour Concert Album was released on May 19, 2008, in South Korea and the DVD was released on October 1, 2008, selling over 15,000 copies domestically.

== Opening acts and special appearances ==
Zhang Liyin was the opening act for the last Super Show concert in Chengdu on March 7, 2009, singing "I Will" and "The Left Shore of Happiness." X-Mas of TRAX was also the guest performer of the last Super Show, playing the guitar for Heechul's solo performance, "Crazy." Super Junior-M member Henry performed the violin bridge of "Don't Don" of every show, and along with Zhou Mi, performed with the rest of Super Junior-M in the China tour stops.

== Set list ==
Super Show set list

=== Songs ===
The following list is a list of songs covered at the tour, not in any order.

- "Twins (Knock Out)"
- "Rock this house"
- "Don't Don" (ft. Henry Lau)
- "A Man In Love" (Remix)
- "Mirror"
- "She's gone"
- "You're my endless love"
- "Dancing Out"
- "Hate U, Love U"
- "Marry U"
- "Y.M.C.A."
- "Wonder Boy"
- "First Snow"
- "The girl is mine"
- "U"
- "Full of Happiness"
- "Way for love"
- "Believe"
- "Miracle"

=== Sub-unit performances ===
The following is a list of small group performances covered at the tour, arranged in order.

==== Super Junior-K.R.Y ====
- "The Night Chicago Died"
- "Steps to stop"
- "Just You"

==== Super Junior-T ====
- "Rokkugo"
- "First Express"
- "Don't Go Away/There's No One Like Me/Is There Nothing Left Of Me"
- "First Express" (Remix)

=== Super Junior-M ===
- Henry violin solo (China only)
- "Me" (China only)
- "At Least There's Still You" (China only)
- "Love Song" (China only)

=== Others ===
- "My Everything" - Donghae - (originally by 98 Degrees)
- "The First Impression" - Kyuhyun (Ryeowook piano accompaniment)
- "A Doll" - Leeteuk and Yesung duet
- "Crying Nut" & "Luxemburg" - Kang-In feat. Leeteuk, Shindong (Sungmin electric guitar and Siwon drums accompaniment)
- "H.I.T" - Yesung, Kang-In, Sungmin, Donghae, Ryeowook, Kyuhyun
- "One Love" - Eunhyuk, Kyuhyun, Ryeowook, Yesung
- "SexyBack" - Han Geng, Shindong, Eunhyuk, Donghae
- "Pink Spider" - Heechul (Sungmin electric guitar and Siwon drums accompaniment)
- "Crazy" - Heechul (Sungmin electric guitar, Siwon drums, and X-mas guitar accompaniment) (Chengdu stop only)

== Tour dates ==
Date	City	Country	Venue	Attendance
February 22, 2008	Seoul	South Korea	Olympic Fencing Gymnasium	20,000
February 23, 2008	Seoul	South Korea	Olympic Fencing Gymnasium	20,000
February 24, 2008	Seoul	South Korea	Olympic Fencing Gymnasium	20,000
July 12, 2008	Bangkok	Thailand	Impact Arena	13,000
November 22, 2008	Shanghai	China	Shanghai Grand Stage	10,000
January 3, 2009	Seoul	South Korea	Olympic Fencing Gymnasium	13,000
January 4, 2009	Seoul	South Korea	Olympic Fencing Gymnasium	13,000
January 17, 2009	Nanjing	China	Nanjing Olympic Sports Center Gymnasium	20,000
January 18, 2009	Nanjing	China	Nanjing Olympic Sports Center Gymnasium	20,000
March 7, 2009	Chengdu	China	Chengdu Longquanyi Football Stadium	10,000
Total				86,000

== Personnel ==
- Super Junior – performers
- SM Entertainment – organizers
- DREAM MAKER ENTERCOM, CREAZONE – promoters
- True Music (Thailand) – overseas organizers

== Live album ==
Super Show - Super Junior The 1st Asia Tour Concert Album
- Super Show - Super Junior The 1st Asia Tour Concert Album cover

Live album by Super Junior
- Released: May 19, 2008
- Recorded: February 22–24, 2008; Olympic Fencing Gymnasium
- Genre: K-pop, dance, R&B, hip hop, trot
- Length: 128:18
- Language: Korean
- Label: SM Entertainment

Super Junior chronology
Super Show - Super Junior The 1st Asia Tour Concert Album (2008)	Super Show 2 Concert Album (2009)

Super Show - Super Junior The 1st Asia Tour Concert Album is the first live album of South Korean boy band Super Junior. It was released on May 19, 2008, by SM Entertainment. The songs in this album are direct recordings from their concerts at the Olympic Fencing Gymnasium in Seoul, South Korea from February 22 to 24, the first stop of their Super Show. It was also released in Taiwan by Avex Taiwan on June 27, 2008. It debuted at number one on Taiwan's G-Music Weekly G-Music J-Pop/K-Pop Chart with a percentage sales of 27.58%.

=== Track listing ===
CD 1

1. "Welcome To S.J.World"
2. "Twins (Knock Out)"
3. Intro + "Rock This House"
4. Intro + "돈돈! (Don't Don)"
5. "Asian Freak Show"
6. "갈증 (A Man In Love)"
7. "거울 (Mirror)"
8. Ment #1
9. "사랑이 떠나다 (She's Gone)"
10. "You're My Endless Love (말하자면)"
11. "Dancing Out"
12. Super Junior-K.R.Y – "The Night Chicago Died"
13. Donghae – "My Everything" (Note: Originally sung by 98 Degrees)
14. Kyuhyun, Ryeowook – "처음 느낌 그대로" (Note: Originally sung by Lee Sora.) (Note: Ryeowook plays piano accompaniment)
15. Leeteuk, Yesung – "인형 (Doll)" (Note: Originally sung by Shin Hyesung and Lee Jihoon.)
16. Super Junior-K.R.Y – "걸음을 멈추고"
17. Kang-In, Leeteuk, Shindong, Sungmin, Siwon – "룩셈부르크" (Note: Leeteuk and Shindong sings background vocals; Sungmin plays electric guitar accompaniment; Siwon plays drums accompaniment)

CD 2

1. Super Junior-T – "로꾸거!!! (Rokkuko)"
2. Super Junior-T – "첫차 (First Express)"
3. Super Junior-T – "나같은건 없는건가요 (Don't Go Away)"
4. "H.I.T. (히트)"
5. Eunhyuk, Super Junior-K.R.Y – "One Love"
6. "미워 (Hate U, Love U)"
7. Ment #2
8. "Marry U"
9. "Y.M.C.A."
10. "Wonder Boy"
11. "첫눈이 와 (First Snow)"
12. "Ment #3"
13. 마지막 승부 (The Girl Is Mine)"
14. "U"
15. "행복 (Full Of Happiness)"
16. "차근차근 (Way For Love)"
17. "Believe"
18. "Miracle"
19. [Bonus Track] "One Love" (Studio Ver.)

=== Charts ===
Country	Chart	Period	Position	Sales
South Korea	MIAK	May	4	15,016
Taiwan	G-Music J-Pop/K-Pop Chart	June 27 - July 3, 2008 (week 26)	1	27.58%
