= Me (Super Junior-M album) =

- Mainland China version cover

Studio album by Super Junior-M
- Released: April 23, 2008
- Recorded: 2007–2008
- Studios: Leadsound (Seoul); SM Booming System (Seoul); SM Concert Hall (Seoul); SM Yellow Tail (Seoul)
- Genres: Mandopop; R&B; dance; electropop
- Length: 46:05
- Language: Mandarin
- Labels: SM; Avex Taiwan
- Producer: Lee Soo-man

Super Junior-M chronology
Me (2008)	Super Girl (2009)

Singles from 迷 (Me)
- 1. "U" Released: April 8, 2008; 2. "Me" Released: September 14, 2008

Me (Chinese: 迷; pinyin: mí) is the first studio album by Mandopop boy band Super Junior-M. Me was released in CD stores in selected provinces of China starting April 23, 2008. A Korean version of the album with three bonus Korean tracks was released in South Korea on April 30, 2008. Modified versions of the album were distributed in Taiwan, Hong Kong, Malaysia, Thailand, Japan, and other Asian countries on May 2, 2008.

Avex Taiwan released an Asia Deluxe Edition repackage of the album on August 1, 2008, which not only includes the three bonus Korean tracks, but also a DVD.

== Overview ==
Super Junior-M is Super Junior's third official sub-unit after Super Junior-K.R.Y and Super Junior-T, and debuted in China on April 8, 2008, with the release of their first promotional single, "U", a Mandarin remake of Super Junior's 2006 best-selling Korean single, "U." The album was recorded in Korea and took over three months to complete. Henry, a new addition to Super Junior-M, contributed in the album with violin instrumentals while Zhou Mi, also a new addition to the group, composed the lyrics of three tracks.

Unlike the original version, the title song "U" involved new incorporations of a new jazz swing style, with new acoustic guitar arrangements and an added hip-hop dance bridge and violin bridge. Other remakes in the album, such as "Miracle", "Full of Happiness", "Don't Don", "Marry U" and "A Man In Love" are all previous hit singles by Super Junior, and are re-arranged to sound more suitable for the Chinese language, however nonetheless, keeping close to original K-pop vibe. "At Least There's Still You" (至少還有你) is a remake of Sandy Lam's 2000 hit single of the same name. The song is rearranged to a more elegant and modern arrangement, with gentle harmonization that the original single did not have. New tracks such as "Me", "Love Song", "In my Arms", and "The Moment" showcase a variety of music styles representing Super Junior-M's balance in pop music. "Me" is exhilarating modern rock style dance music with refreshing rhythm and an acoustic guitar accompaniment. It is also the album's second single. "Love Song" is a medium tempo dance song with light-hearted lyrics and melodies. "In My Arms" is a mellow R&B ballad with a powerful tempo drum beat; however, it brightens the song with a dreamlike melody and chorus. "The Moment" is a fast dance track with sensuous rap and splendid string incorporation. The last track, "The One", is a composition dedicated to the 2008 Beijing Olympics. The ballad incorporates a magnificent and rich chorus behind the melody of a grand violin accompaniment.

"At Least There's Still You" (2000)
The original ballad by Sandy Lam.

"At Least There's Still You" (2008)
Super Junior-M's rendition of the original, incorporated with more harmonization and modern instrumental.

== Commercial performance ==
In South Korea, Me charted at number 12 on the monthly Music Industry Association of Korea album chart for April 2008, selling 7,915 copies. The album later entered South Korea's weekly Gaon Album Chart in 2011 at number 35. It has sold a total of 12,820 copies in South Korea as of 2011. In Taiwan, Me debuted at number 2 on the Five Music Mandarin CD sales chart for the week starting May 2, 2008. It remained on the chart for five weeks.

In mainland China, Me peaked at number 1 on Sohu's Top in Music chart for the second week of June 2008. The chart is based on album sales, radio play, and netizen votes. In Thailand, Me debuted at number 1 on June 10, 2008, on the B2S Top 20, a chart that reflects album sales from Thailand's largest music retailer.

== Track listing ==
1. "迷 (Me)" – 3:59
2. "U" (remake of "U") – 4:08
3. "至少还有你" (remake of "至少還有你" by Sandy Lam) – 4:14
4. "你是我的奇迹 (Miracle)" (remake of "Miracle") – 3:19
5. "爱你爱你 (Love Song)" – 2:57
6. "我抱着我 (In my Arms)" – 3:44
7. "Don't Don" (remake of "돈 돈! (Don't Don)") – 4:12
8. "Marry U" (remake of "Marry U") – 3:17
9. "我的二分之一 (Full of Happiness)" (remake of "행복") – 3:29
10. "渴望 (A Man In Love)" (remake of "갈증 (A Man In Love)") – 4:33
11. "这一秒 (The Moment)" – 3:12
12. "The One" – 5:01
13. "迷 (Me)" (KOREAN VER.) ^{1} – 3:59 (Korea bonus track)
14. "당신이기에" ("至少还有你" KOREAN VER.) ^{1} – 4:14 (Korea bonus track)
15. "아이니아이니" ("爱你爱你" KOREAN VER.) ^{1} – 2:57 (Korea bonus track)

^{1} Tracks also appear on "Asia Deluxe Edition".

=== English track listing ===
1. "Charm (Me)" – 3:59
2. "U" (remake of "U") – 4:08
3. "At Least There's Still You" (remake of "At Least There's Still You") – 4:14
4. "You Are My Miracle (Miracle)" (remake of "Miracle") – 3:19
5. "Love You Love You (Love Song)" – 2:57
6. "I Hug Myself (In my Arms)" – 3:44
7. "Don't Don" (remake of "Money Money! (Don't Don)") – 4:12
8. "Marry U" (remake of "Marry U") – 3:17
9. "My Half (Full of Happiness)" (remake of "Full of Happiness") – 3:29
10. "Thirst (A Man In Love)" (remake of "Thirst (A Man In Love)") – 4:33
11. "This Second (The Moment)" – 3:12
12. "The One" – 5:01
13. "Charm (Me)" (KOREAN VER.) ^{1} – 3:59 (Korea bonus track)
14. "Because Of You" ("At Least There's Still You" KOREAN VER.) ^{1}– 4:14 (Korea bonus track)
15. "Ainiaini" ("Love Song" KOREAN VER.) ^{1}— 2:57 (Korea bonus track)

=== Asia Deluxe Edition DVD track listing ===
1. Debut short trailer clip – Han Geng
2. Debut short trailer clip – Siwon and Donghae
3. Debut short trailer clip – Kyuhyun and Henry
4. Debut short trailer clip – Ryeowook and Zhou Mi
5. "U - Music video", The Making (Traditional Chinese subtitles)
6. "U" - Music video" (Traditional Chinese subtitles)

== Personnel ==
=== Vocals ===
- Han Geng – except track 6
- Siwon – except track 6
- Donghae – except track 6
- Kyuhyun – all tracks
- Henry – except track 6
- Ryeowook – all tracks
- Zhou Mi – all tracks

Backing vocals

- Han Geng – tenor, rapper (tracks: 2, 6, 7, 10)
- Siwon – baritone (tracks: 2, 6, 7)
- Donghae – tenor, rapper (tracks: 2, 6, 7, 10)
- Kyuhyun – bass (tracks: 1, 2, 3, 5–9, 11, 12)
- Henry – tenor, rapper (tracks: 6, 7)
- Ryeowook – tenor (tracks: 1–3, 5–12)
- Zhou Mi – tenor, rapper (tracks: 1, 3, 5–12)
- Kenzie – backing vocals (track 1)
- Yesung (Super Junior) – baritone (track 2)
- Yoo Young-Jin – backing vocals (tracks: 2, 7, 10)
- Kim Hyeon-A – backing vocals (tracks: 6, 10)
- Hwang Sung-Je – backing vocals (track 9)
- Lee Joo-Hyoung – backing vocals (track 9)

=== Musicians ===
- Kim Jung-Bae – guitar (tracks: 1, 3)
- Min Jae-Hyun – bass (tracks: 1, 3, 5)
- Ham Chun-Ho – guitar (track 2)
- Song Gwang-Sik – electric piano (tracks: 2, 5)
- K-strings – strings (tracks: 2, 3, 5, 6, 8, 9, 11, 12)
- Henry – violin (tracks: 2, 7, 11, 12)
- Song Young-Joo – piano (track 3)
- Ko Tae-Young – guitar (tracks: 4, 11)
- Sam Lee – guitar (tracks: 5, 6, 8, 12)
- Groovie.K – electric guitar (track 7), acoustic guitar (track 10)
- Gil Eun-Kyung – keyboard (track 8)
- Lee Sung-Ryul – guitar (track 9)
- Yoo Young-Jin – acoustic guitar (track 10)

== Charts ==
=== Weekly charts ===
Chart (2011)	Peak position
South Korea (Gaon Album Chart)	35
South Korea (Gaon International Albums)	2

=== Monthly charts ===
Chart (2008)	Peak position
South Korea (MIAK)	12
Chart (2011)	Peak position
South Korea (Gaon International Albums)	11
