= Sorry, Sorry (Super Junior song) =

2009 single by Super Junior

- Promotional picture for "Sorry, Sorry"

Single by Super Junior

from the album Sorry, Sorry
- Language: Korean; Japanese
- Released: March 9, 2009
- Studio: SM Booming System (Seoul)
- Genre: Dance-pop
- Length: 3:52
- Label: SM
- Composer: Yoo Young-jin
- Lyricist: Yoo Young-jin
- Producer: Yoo Young-jin

Super Junior singles chronology
"Marry U" (2008)	"Sorry, Sorry" (2009)	"It's You" (2009)

Audio sample
- file; help

Music video
- "Sorry, Sorry" on YouTube

"Sorry, Sorry" (Korean: 쏘리 쏘리; RR: Ssori ssori) is a song performed by South Korean boy band Super Junior. It was released as a digital single on March 9, 2009, and was later included as the title single in the group's third studio album, Sorry, Sorry, released on March 12, 2009. This song was Super Junior's comeback single as a complete group since their subgroup activities in Mainland China and South Korea in 2008. It was Super Junior's most successful single on the music charts, winning a total of 10 recognitions during the song's promotional period.

== Composition ==
"Sorry, Sorry" was written by Yoo Young-jin, who wrote "Don't Don", the title track of Super Junior's second album Don't Don. Yoo reportedly wanted create a song which is both equally fun and easy to listen. The song is a "polished and trendy" dance song, with influences of American funk and contemporary R&B, stimulated with a heavy electronic beat that is the genre of "urban minimal funky", which is remarkably different than the band's previous releases. The lyrics revolve around a guy apologizing for his undying love for the girl. The song is composed in the key of B minor with a tempo of 130 beats per minute.

=== Sorry Sorry-Answer ===
Following the success of Super Junior's second Asia Tour, Super Show 2, a live album titled Super Show 2 Tour Concert Album was recorded at the concerts held in Seoul from July 17–19, 2009, and released on December 10, 2009. Included in the album is a studio version of "Sorry Sorry-Answer", an R&B remix of "Sorry, Sorry", which was digitally released ahead of the album's release on December 9, 2009. A music video for "Sorry Sorry-Answer" was released on the next day. The music video was directed by Chun Hyuk-jin and was filmed in Namyangju in August 2009.

The song was performed live by Super Junior-K.R.Y. on September 2–4, 2011 in front of 150,000 audiences at Tokyo Dome, Japan, and on October 23, 2011, at the sold-out concert at Madison Square Garden, New York during the SM Town Live '10 World Tour. Besides Super Show 2, the band also performed the song during their concert tour Super Show 8: Infinite Time which was held starting October 2019 until its cancellation due to the outbreak of COVID-19 pandemic.

== Reception ==
"Sorry, Sorry" peaked at number 1 on Mnet's M! Countdown chart in just a week. "Sorry, Sorry" achieved its first recognition as the number 1 song of KBS's Music Bank monthly pop chart on March 27, 2009, after only two weeks in the charts. The single won again for the April pop chart, and had two consecutive wins on the weekly pop chart in the first two weeks of May. "Sorry, Sorry" also won Mutizen song at SBS's Inkigayo for three consecutive weeks, earning a "Triple Crown" for the first time in the group's career. The single also became a song of the week on Mnet's M! Countdown on April 9 and 23, although Super Junior was not present at the program to receive their awards. "Sorry, Sorry" remained within the top 10 in Mnet's music chart for another 12 weeks. The song was also successful in the Philippines; peaking at number 6 in an international countdown by Myx Philippines. It was influential in increasing sales of 50 Cent's "Many Men" single. Super Junior also dominated Taiwan's radio channel 'Hit Fm' released the 100 singles chart for 2009, ranking number 1.

== Music video and promotion ==
=== Music video ===
Super Junior posing right before the first dance break in the beginning of "Sorry, Sorry".

The music video was filmed from February 28 to March 1, 2009. A 30-second teaser of the video was released on Super Junior's official website on March 6, 2009, and the complete video was released on March 13, the same day as Super Junior's comeback performance on KBS's Music Bank. The video was SM Entertainment's first anamorphic formatted music video with an aspect ratio of 2.39:1. Throughout most of the video, only eleven members are seen dancing to most of the choreography, although the video does include all thirteen members of Super Junior. Heechul appears to be in the dance towards the end of the video, and Kibum only appears in solo shots. The music video was published on SMTOWN's YouTube Channel on June 7, 2009.

The video starts off with an experimental scene, a woman's eye peeping through a key hole. She then pulls up her skirt, exposing her legs, and Super Junior member Kibum blindfolds himself; a small flame is burning an enclosed envelope, which is sealed with sealing wax. The woman then touches her lips and pulls off her pearl necklace. This scene is then engulfed to blackness and zooms to Super Junior, who are seen posing side by side in front of a white screen. Han Geng leads the group into a gentle sliding pose, and then they start dancing. In the song's dance bridge the members are tutting, with Eunhyuk in the lead. The whole music video is in black and white. The dance is choreographed by Nick Bass as well as Trent Dickens, who is known for working with international stars like Usher and Justin Timberlake. Another music video which focused on the song's choreography was released on April 3, 2009. The original music video surpassed 100 million views on YouTube in December 2018. On October 5, 2022, the original MV was officially remastered into 4K high-quality.

=== Promotion ===
Super Junior's members Leeteuk and Eunhyuk first revealed the key point of "Sorry, Sorry" choreography in Kiss The Radio on March 6, 2009, ahead of its release. Member Kibum did not participate in the promotional activities. Super Junior performed "Sorry, Sorry" on the music programs Music Bank, Music Core, and Popular Songs three times a week, starting March 13, 2009. On March 13, they performed the song live at Kiss The Radio. Promotional performances lasted for two full months, with the last performance carried out on May 16, 2009, on Music Core. The first overseas performance of "Sorry, Sorry" was in Beijing, China, on May 1, 2009, at the Beijing National Stadium. The single was also featured on Perez Hilton's blog. They also performed the song at the 20th Golden Melody Awards in Taiwan, after becoming the only foreign act invited to the ceremony.

== Covers ==
"Sorry, Sorry" has been covered multiple times by other K-pop groups, including on Korean television during special stages and at concerts. Girls' Generation covered the song on the August 8, 2009, edition of Show! Music Core, while Jessica and Tiffany covered Heechul's and Kangin's dance parts respectively in a video sketch called The Secret of "Gee", shown before Super Junior's "Gee" cover at Super Show 2. Girls' Generation and f(x) additionally covered the song at the 2009 SBS Gayo Daejeon. Exo covered the song on the March 8, 2014 broadcast of Show! Music Core, which marked the 400th episode in the show's history. Seventeen performed "Sorry, Sorry" on the September 12, 2015, edition of Show! Music Core while NCT performed it on the August 16, 2016, edition of M Countdown. At KCON 2017 in Los Angeles, SF9 and Cosmic Girls covered the song. Loona covered it on the March 5, 2020 broadcast of M Countdown. N.SSign performed a rock version of the song during Idol Radio Live in Japan concert on April 1, 2023.

== Cultural impact ==
The song's dance routine has been performed many times. In April 2009, professional volleyball player Kim Yeon-koung from Heungkuk Life announced that if her team would win the 2008–2009 NH Nonghyup professional volleyball championship, they would perform the dance routine of "Sorry, Sorry". Heungkuk Life won the championship and the players danced to the song at the award ceremony on April 12, 2009. A football player, Kim Seung-yong who played for FC Seoul danced to "Sorry, Sorry" after he scored a goal in a match against Seongnam Ilhwa Chunma in 2009 K League. Basketball players also danced to the song at the 2008–09 Dongbu Promy Professional Basketball season awards ceremony, which marked the end of the season in professional basketball league.

On May 4, 2009, the honor guard made up of South Korean Air Force danced to "Sorry, Sorry" and "Gee" ahead of the groundbreaking ceremony of Airforce Museum at Sanjicheon, Jeju City. In the same month, employees of Korean Air formed a parody group called Jikjjangin Super Junior (Korean:직장인 슈퍼주니어, lit. 'Office Workers Super Junior'). They performed "Sorry, Sorry" choreography at the Kalman Small Concert, an in-house concert held at Korean Air's headquarters on May 15, and subsequently released its music video online. The music video gained the attention of SBS's producers, and the group was invited to perform at the reality television show Star King. In the Philippines, a video clip of inmates, known as the CPDRC Dancing Inmates, from the Cebu Provincial Detention and Rehabilitation Center dancing to "Sorry, Sorry" went viral after it was uploaded on YouTube.

The drama The City Hall which aired on SBS TV has the song incorporated in its final episode, with the main characters performing the song's choreography while participating in a city festival.

== Accolades ==
"Sorry Sorry" on critic lists
Publisher	List	Rank	Year published
Mnet	Legend 100 Songs	—	2014
The Dong-a Ilbo	Best Male Idol Songs from the Past 20 Years	6	2016
Billboard	10 Greatest K-Pop Choruses of the 21st Century	6	2017
Melon	Top 100 K-pop Songs of All Time	12	2021
Rolling Stone	100 Greatest Songs in the History of Korean Pop Music	12	2023
Spin	21 Greatest K-Pop Songs Of All Time	15	2012
Globe Telecom	Iconic K-pop Music Videos	—	2020
Music Y	120 Greatest Dance Tracks of All Time	86	2014

Music program awards
Program	Date	Ref.
Music Bank	March 27, 2009	
Music Bank	April 24, 2009	
Music Bank	May 1, 2009	
Music Bank	May 8, 2009	
Music Bank	May 15, 2009	
Inkigayo	March 29, 2009	
Inkigayo	April 5, 2009	
Inkigayo	April 12, 2009	
M Countdown	April 9, 2009	
M Countdown	April 23, 2009	

== Credits ==
Credits adapted from album's liner notes.

Studio

- SM Booming System – recording, mixing
- Sonic Korea – mastering

Personnel

- SM Entertainment – executive producer
- Lee Soo-man – producer
- Super Junior – vocals, background vocals
- Yoo Young-jin – producer, Korean lyrics, composition, arrangement, vocal directing, background vocals, recording, mixing
- C.Close – Japanese lyrics
- Jeon Hoon – mastering

== Release history ==
Release history for "Sorry, Sorry"
Region	Date	Version	Format	Label	Ref
Various	March 9, 2009	Korean	Digital download; streaming	SM	
Japan	July 5, 2009	Japanese	Digital download; streaming	Avex Trax	
Various	December 10, 2009	Sorry, Sorry-Answer	Digital download; streaming	SM	
