= Sorry, Sorry (album) =

- Digital and A version cover.

Studio album by Super Junior
- Released: March 12, 2009
- Recorded: July 2008 – February 2009
- Studios: Lead (Seoul); Mojo Sound (Seoul); SM Blue Ocean (Seoul); SM Booming System (Seoul); SM Concert Hall (Seoul); SM Yellow Tail (Seoul); T-Studio (Seoul)
- Genres: K-pop; R&B; dance; electronica
- Length: 44:05; 58:29 (repackage)
- Language: Korean
- Label: SM
- Producer: Lee Soo-man

Super Junior chronology
Don't Don (2007)	Sorry, Sorry (2009)	Bonamana (2010)

Singles from Sorry, Sorry
- 1. "Sorry, Sorry" Released: March 3, 2009; 2. "It's You" Released: May 11, 2009

Music video
- "Sorry, Sorry" on YouTube "It's You" on YouTube

Sorry, Sorry is the third studio album by South Korean boy band Super Junior, released on March 12, 2009. Sorry, Sorry was a critically and commercially successful hit in Asia, becoming 2009's best-selling Korean-language album in South Korea, Taiwan, Thailand, China, and the Philippines. In less than a week after pre-orders were announced, over 150,000 copies were pre-ordered. According to South Korea's Hanteo Charts, it debuted at 1st on the charts with almost 30,000 copies sold on the first day. The album won a Disk Daesang (Album of the Year) at the 2009 Golden Disk Awards. Sorry, Sorry became the last album to feature the group's full 13 member lineup, with Han Geng departing by the end of the year, while Kangin and Kibum would begin a hiatus period before the next album.

== Recording and production ==
In July 2008, Super Junior announced the initial preparations for Sorry, Sorry. In November 2008, Kyuhyun wrote in his fancafe stating that he was preparing for the third album "bit by bit". During a press conference in January 2009 for a Super Show encore concert in Seoul, Kang-in stated that the album will be in a style that will make the audience see a different side of Super Junior. He further commented that while their second album Don't Don did well in 2007, activities promoting the album were lacking due to the activities of different subgroups. Therefore, there will be a concentrated effort to increase promotional activities in order to make Sorry, Sorry more successful. On March 2, SM announced the official release date to be March 12, 2009.

An image teaser of the album was released on March 4, 2009 and a video teaser of the album was released on March 6. "Sorry, Sorry" was released as a digital single through various Korean MP3 sites on March 9.

The album's second promotional single "It's You" was revealed on May 11, 2009. After only five hours of release, the single became the #1 song on Cyworld's Music Charts. A repackaged version of Sorry, Sorry, with four new bonus tracks which included "It's You", was released on May 14, 2009.

== Composition ==
Sorry, Sorry contains primarily pop music, with the album having a more mature approach in style in comparison to previous Super Junior albums. It contains more R&B-styled pop songs with lyrics that represent the evolution of "boys to men." Songs are less cheerful; melodic instruments play a huge part in most of the songs, showing maturity. Rap is also less presented in this album, having a majority of the songs dominated by R&B and harmonious vocals. Super Junior explained that this album is more strongly affiliated with Super Junior's own musical style unlike their previous albums, in which their music had been test-productions for various markets. The album shows its strong influence from contemporary dance and R&B. It draws from bubblegum pop to a lesser degree, unlike their previous albums.

The title song "Sorry, Sorry" was written by Yoo Young-jin, who wrote "Don't Don", the title track of Super Junior's second album Don't Don. Yoo reportedly wanted to create a song which is both equally fun and easy to listen. The song is a "polished and trendy" dance song, with influences of American funk and contemporary R&B, stimulated with a heavy electronic beat that is the genre of "urban minimal funky", a new style that the group has never tried before. Nick Bass, who has worked with international stars like Usher and Justin Timberlake, choreographed the dance for "Sorry, Sorry" with assistant staff Trent Dickens, showing the single's strong musical prominence. The second promotional single "It's You" was written by E-Tribe, famous for creating hits such as "Gee" and Lee Hyori's "U-Go-Girl". "It's You" similarly draws influences from electronic beats; however, it keeps a heavier emphasis on contemporary R&B.

TVXQ members U-Know and Micky wrote the rap and performed it in "Heartquake" and actress Lee Yeon-hee's vocals are also featured in "Club No.1."

== Promotion and reception ==
The year prior to the album's release was seen as a hiatus year for Super Junior, although sub-unit groups Super Junior-M and Super Junior-Happy had been promoting in both China and Korea for most of 2008. Although members of the group were popular on various Korean variety shows, they were falling behind musically, and the group felt that they should be judged on their musical merits before anything else. Through this album, Super Junior hoped that it would give the group a stronger musical impression in the media, confirming a style that is strictly Super Junior's own style of music. As soon as "Sorry, Sorry" was released via MP3 websites, it topped every music chart, confirming the single's popularity. Super Junior explained that "Sorry, Sorry" was not chosen because of popularity, but because they see the song as their own style.

Super Junior's first comeback performance was on March 13 with the performance of "Sorry, Sorry" and "Why I Like You" on KBS's Music Bank. That following weekend, they performed the same two songs on MBC's Show! Music Core and SBS's Popular Songs, and have been performing "Sorry, Sorry" on the same three programs every weekend until July 2009. "Sorry, Sorry" achieved its first recognition as the #1 song of KBS's Music Bank monthly pop chart on March 27 after only two weeks in the charts. The single won again for the April pop chart, and was the #1 song in its weekly pop chart for the first two weeks of May. In addition to other recognitions, the song won the Mutizen Song award on Popular Songs for three consecutive weeks (Triple Crown) and it also became a song of the week on Mnet's M! Countdown on April 9 and 23, although Super Junior was not present at the program to receive their awards. "It's You", however, only received two recognitions during its promotional period.

Outside of Korea, Sorry, Sorry was heavily promoted in other Asian communities. Fifty-one subway trains in Taipei were covered with Sorry, Sorry advertisements from April 17 through May 7 to promote the Taiwan release of Sorry, Sorry, which was released on April 17. One of the trains was the "Super Junior Train", in which the train was entirely covered with Super Junior posters. Taiwan also released an exclusive CD and DVD version of the album on August 14. Sorry, Sorry and its eponymous single was a huge hit in Taiwan, topping all available album and singles chart in the country. It debuted at #2 in Taiwan G-music's Combo chart, #1 in the International chart and #1 in Five Music's Korean chart.

On May 1, Super Junior performed "Sorry, Sorry" and "Why I Like You" for the first time overseas in Beijing, China for Jackie Chan's Bird's Nest concert, simultaneously promoting the Mainland China version of the album's release. Starting June 1, Mnet's sister channel in Japan aired Super Junior documentaries and live performances weekly for seven months. Sorry, Sorry also peaked at #1 on Thailand's international pop charts within two weeks after its release. The album topped Thailand's Channel V Asian Chart for eight consecutive weeks, setting a new record for the chart. Released in the Philippines on September 4, the album topped album charts of Music One that same weekend, outselling albums by Whitney Houston and Michael Jackson. It became the first #1 K-pop in the country, entering the Odyssey album chart one week after its release, and stayed in the charts for over ten consecutive weeks and eventually reached Gold status three months after its release in the country, selling 7,500 units. Both "Sorry, Sorry" and "It's You" became Arirang's Best 10 K-pop songs as #1 and #6 respectively.

Shortly after Super Junior began their promotions on "It's You", the group began preparing for their second Asia-wide tour in the summer of 2009. The tour was officially announced on June 3, 2009, almost three months after the release of Sorry, Sorry. The tour included songs from their previous albums and kicked off with three shows in Seoul, South Korea from July 17 to 19.

== Sales and impact ==
In just a few days, 150,000 copies of Sorry, Sorry were pre-ordered. The album debuted at #1 on the Hanteo Daily Charts, with approximately 30,000 copies sold, making it the biggest opening day for the group. By the end of the week, 36,000 copies had been sold through Hanteo, debuting at #2 on the Hanteo Weekly charts, selling only 4,000 copies less than Seo Taiji's single, which was released on March 10. Sorry, Sorry debuted at #2 on Hottracks Gayo Best 5 on the second week of March and jumped to #1 on the third week. As of May 15, 2009, over 215,000 units had been sold, being the first Korean-language album to do so in 2009.

Sorry, Sorry and both of its singles topped all of Taiwan's yearly, monthly, weekly, and daily Korean charts, thus becoming the best-selling Korean-language and international album in the country. Its long stay as #1 in Thailand's music charts broke records, and was also certified as a best-selling album. Super Junior was awarded with 'Best Selling Album' at the South Korea's Gaon's 2009 Top 100 albums chart. SM Entertainment announced on December 12, 2009, that the album sold 250,683 copies.

Surprisingly, the album made an appearance on the 99th rank of South Korea's Gaon's 2010 Top 100 albums chart, selling 14,581 copies.

== Accolades ==
Awards and nominations
Year	Award	Category	Result	Ref.
2009	Golden Disc Awards	Album Bonsang (Main Prize)	Won	
2009	Golden Disc Awards	Album Daesang (Grand Prize)	Won	
2010	Gaon Chart Awards	Album of the Year	Won	

== Track listing ==
Sorry, Sorry Version A and B track listing
No.	Title	Lyrics	Music	Arrangement	Length
1.	"Sorry, Sorry"	Yoo Young-jin	Yoo Young-jin	Yoo Young-jin	3:52
2.	"Why I Like You" (니가 좋은 이유; Niga joeun iyu)	Shiro	Jimmy Burney; Steven Lee; Sean Alexander (Avenue 52); Pascal Guyon	Steven Lee	3:45
3.	"Let's Not..." (마주치지 말자; Majuchiji malja) (performed by Super Junior-K.R.Y.)	Hwanhee; Young Sky	Hwanhee; Young Sky	Hwanhee; Young Sky	3:40
4.	"Angela" (앤젤라)	Kim Jeong-bae	Kenzie	Kenzie	3:21
5.	"Reset"	Park Chang-hak	Martin Sutton; Shridhar Solanki	Tesung Kim (Iconic Sounds)	3:43
6.	"Monster"	Kenzie	Mikkel Remee Sigvardt; Tim Kellett; Robin Taylor-Firth; Peter Biker	Mikkel Remee Sigvardt; Peter Biker	3:48
7.	"What If"	Sean Hosein (Sean & Dane); Dane DeViller (Sean & Dane); Jörgen Elofsson; Kwon Yoon-jung	Sean Hosein (Sean & Dane); Dane DeViller (Sean & Dane); Jörgen Elofsson; Andy Goldmark	Ferdie Marquez; Kenzie	3:26
8.	"Heartquake" (이별... 넌 쉽니; Ibyeol... neon swimni) (featuring U-Know and Yoochun)	Young Sky; July; U-Know; Yoochun	Young Sky; Cubase J	Young Sky	4:07
9.	"Club No.1" (featuring Lee Yeon-hee)	Choi Gap-won	Gabe Lopez; Angela Peel	Tesung Kim (Iconic Sounds)	3:09
10.	"Happy Together"	LeeOn; Cho Sa-ra	LeeOn	LeeOn	3:34
11.	"Dead at Heart" (죽어있는 것; Jugeoinneun geot)	Park Chang-hyun	Park Chang-hyun	Park Chang-hyun	4:09
12.	"Shining Star"	Yoo Young-suk	Yoo Young-suk	Seo J	3:25
Total length:					44:05

Sorry, Sorry Repackage track listing
No.	Title	Lyrics	Music	Arrangement	Length
1.	"Sorry, Sorry"	Yoo Young-jin	Yoo Young-jin	Yoo Young-jin	3:52
2.	"She Wants It" (그녀는 위험해; Geunyeoneun wiheomhae)	Young-hu Kim	Sean Alexander (Avenue 52); Jimmy Andrew Richard; Gabe Lopez; Michael Snyder	Avenue 52	3:55
3.	"It's You" (너라고; Neorago)	E-Tribe	E-Tribe	E-Tribe	3:51
4.	"Love Disease" (사랑이 죽는 병; Sarangi jungneun byeong)	Wheesung	Jimmy Burney; Sean Alexander (Avenue 52); Pascal Guyon	Avenue 52	3:30
5.	"Love U More" (첫번째 이야기; Cheotbeonjjae iyagi)	Ryeowook; Sungmin	Ryeowook	Ryeowook; Kenzie	3:08
6.	"Why I Like You" (니가 좋은 이유)	Shiro	Jimmy Burney; Steven Lee; Sean Alexander (Avenue 52); Pascal Guyon	Steven Lee	3:45
7.	"Let's Not..." (마주치지 말자) (performed by Super Junior-K.R.Y.)	Hwanhee; Young Sky	Hwanhee; Young Sky	Young Sky	3:40
8.	"Angela" (앤젤라)	Kim Jeong-bae	Kenzie	Kenzie	3:21
9.	"Reset"	Park Chang-hak	Martin Sutton; Shridhar Solanki	Tesung Kim (Iconic Sounds)	3:43
10.	"Monster"	Kenzie	Mikkel Remee Sigvardt; Tim Kellett; Robin Taylor-Firth; Peter Biker	Mikkel Remee Sigvardt; Peter Biker; Kenzie	3:48
11.	"What If"	Sean Hosein (Sean & Dane); Dane DeViller (Sean & Dane); Jörgen Elofsson; Kwon Yoon-jung	Sean Hosein (Sean & Dane); Dane DeViller (Sean & Dane); Jörgen Elofsson; Andy Goldmark	Ferdie Marquez; Kenzie	3:26
12.	"Heartquake" (이별... 넌 쉽니) (featuring U-Know and Yoochun)	Young Sky; July; U-Know; Yoochun	Young Sky; Cubase J	Young Sky	4:07
13.	"Club No.1" (featuring Lee Yeon-hee)	Choi Gap-won	Gabe Lopez; Angela Peel	Tesung Kim (Iconic Sounds)	3:09
14.	"Happy Together"	LeeOn; Cho Sa-ra	LeeOn	LeeOn	3:34
15.	"Dead at Heart" (죽어있는 것)	Park Chang-hyun	Park Chang-hyun	Park Chang-hyun	4:09
16.	"Shining Star"	Yoo Young-suk	Yoo Young-suk	Seo J	3:25
Total length:					58:29

Japanese edition bonus track
No.	Title	Lyrics	Music	Arrangement	Length
17.	"Sorry, Sorry" (Japanese version)	Yoo Young-jin	Yoo Young-jin	Yoo Young-jin	3:52
Total length:					62:21

Version D (DVD)
No.	Title	Length
1.	"Sorry, Sorry" (version A and B photoshoot)
2.	"Sorry, Sorry" (music video behind-the-scene)
3.	"Sorry, Sorry" (music video)
4.	"Sorry, Sorry" (version "C" cover photoshoot)
5.	"It's You" (music video behind-the-scene)
6.	"It's You" (music video)

== Personnel ==
Credits are adapted from the album liner notes. The tracks numbering is according to the repackage edition of the album.

Musicians

- Super Junior – vocals, background vocals (1, 2, 3)
  - Leeteuk
  - Heechul
  - Han Geng
  - Eunhyuk – rap making (2, 9, 16)
  - Kangin
  - Shindong
  - Sungmin – background vocals (16), lyrics (5)
  - Yesung – background vocals (4, 6, 7, 8, 9, 10, 11, 12, 13, 14, 16)
  - Donghae – background vocals (16)
  - Siwon
  - Ryeowook – background vocals (4, 6, 7, 8, 9, 10, 11, 12, 13, 14), lyrics (5), composition (5), arrangement (5), director (5)
  - Kibum
  - Kyuhyun – background vocals (4, 6, 7, 8, 9, 10, 11, 12, 13, 14, 16)
- TVXQ – vocals (12)
  - U-Know – rap making (12)
  - Micky – rap making (12)
- Lee Yeon-hee – vocals (13)

Additional musicians

- Yoo Young-jin – lyrics (1), composition (1), arrangement (1), director (1), background vocals (1)
- Young-hu Kim – lyrics (2)
- Gabe Lopez – composition (2, 13), arrangement (2, 13)
- Jimmy Andrew Richard – composition (2), arrangement (2)
- Michael Snyder – composition (2), arrangement (2)
- Sean Alexander – composition (2, 4, 6), arrangement (2, 4, 6), guitar (4, 6)
- Ko Tae-young – guitar (2, 5, 7, 12, 13)
- Tesung Kim – background vocals (2, 13), arrangement (9, 13), director (9, 13)
- E-Tribe – lyrics (3), composition (3), arrangement (3), director (3)
- Ko Myung-jae – guitar (3)
- Ener-One – synth programming (3), background vocals (3)
- Wheesung – lyrics (4)
- Jimmy Burney – composition (4, 6), arrangement (4, 6)
- Pascal Guyon – composition (4, 6), arrangement (4, 6)
- Ham Hyung-kyu – song director (4)
- Kenzie – arrangement (5, 8, 11), composition (8), director (8, 10, 11), background vocals (8), lyrics (10), additional arrangement (10)
- Min Jae-hyun – bass (5, 16)
- Song Young-ju – piano (5, 7, 11, 12)
- K-String – strings (5, 7, 10, 11, 12, 14, 15, 16)
- Lee Na-il – string arrangement (5, 7, 12), string conductor (5, 7, 12)
- Shiro – lyrics (6)
- Steven Lee – composition (6), arrangement (6)
- Lee Jae-myung – song director (6, 15), lyrics (14), composition (14), arrangement (14), director (14)
- Hwanhee – lyrics (7), composition (7), director (7)
- Young Sky – composition (7, 12), arrangement (7, 12), director (7), lyrics (12), song director (12)
- Kang Su-ho – drum (7, 16)
- Choi Hoon – bass (7)
- Han Won-jong – background vocals (7)
- Kim Jeong-bae – lyrics (8), guitar (8, 11)
- Choi Won-hyuk – bass (8, 11)
- Park Chang-hak – lyrics (9)
- Martin Sutton – composition (9)
- Shridar Solanki – composition (9)
- Lim Sun-ho – guitar (9, 16)
- Mikkel Remee Sigvardt – composition (10)
- Tim Kellett – composition (10)
- Robin Taylor-Firth – composition (10)
- Peter Biker – composition (10)
- Kwon Yoon-jung – lyrics (11)
- Sean Syed Hosein – composition (11)
- Dane Anthony DeViller – composition (11)
- Jörgen Elofsson – composition (11)
- Andrew Goldmark – composition (11)
- Shim Sang-won – string arrangement (11), string conductor (11)
- July – lyrics (12), song director (12), background vocals (12)
- Choi Gap-won – lyrics (13)
- Angela Peel – composition (13), arrangement (13)
- Cho Sa-ra – lyrics (14)
- Lee Sung-ryul – guitar (14)
- Gil Eun-kyung – keyboard (14)
- Jang Soo-nyeon – string arrangement (14), string conductor (14)
- Park Chang-hyun – lyrics (15), composition (15), arrangement (15), song director (15), background vocals (15)
- Yum Cheol-hee – song director (15)
- Shin Min – string arrangement (15), string conductor (15)
- Yoo Young-suk – lyrics (16), composition (16), director (16)
- Miho – arrangement (16), string arrangement (16), string conductor (16)

Technical personnel

- Soo-man Lee – producer
- Jeon Hoon at Sonic Korea – mastering
- Yoo Young-jin at SM Booming System – recording, mixing
- Lee Sung-ho at SM Yellow Tail Studio – recording, mixing
- KAT at SM Blue Ocean Studio – recording
- Tesung Kim at SM Blue Ocean Studio – recording
- Young Sky at SM Blue Ocean Studio – recording
- Kenzie at SM Blue Ocean Studio – recording
- Nam Goong-jin at SM Concert Hall Studio – mixing, recording
- Shin Ji-young at Mojo Sound – recording
- Jang Min at Mojo Sound – recording
- Oh Sung-keun at T-Studio – recording
- Lee Myung-sook at T-Studio – recording
- Kim Dong-hoon at T-Studio – recording
- Park Dong-won at T-Studio – recording
- Uhm Chan-yong at Lead Sound – recording
- Jung Eun-kyung at Rooby sound studio and Coo Sound – recording

== Charts ==
=== Weekly charts ===
Chart (2009, 2011)	Peak position
Japanese Albums (Oricon)	33
South Korean Albums (Gaon)	17
Taiwan Combo Albums (G-Music)	2
Taiwan East Asia Albums (G-Music)	1

=== Yearly charts ===
Chart (2009)	Position
South Korean Albums (Gaon)	1

== Sales and certifications ==
Region	Certification	Certified units/sales
Philippines (PARI)	Gold	7,500^{*}
South Korea (Gaon)	—	299,140
^{*} Sales figures based on certification alone.

== Release history ==
Region	Date	Edition	Format	Distributing label
South Korea	March 12, 2009	Sorry, Sorry	CD; digital download	SM Entertainment
Thailand	April 9, 2009	Sorry, Sorry	CD; digital download	GMM Grammy
Taiwan	April 17, 2009	Sorry, Sorry	CD; digital download	Avex Taiwan
Hong Kong	April 23, 2009	Sorry, Sorry	CD; digital download	Avex Asia
South Korea	May 14, 2009	It's You	CD; digital download	SM Entertainment
Hong Kong	May 18, 2009	It's You	CD; digital download	Avex Asia
Taiwan	June 19, 2009	It's You	CD; digital download	Avex Taiwan
Japan	July 15, 2009	Japanese	CD; DVD	Rhythm Zone
Taiwan	August 7, 2009	Sorry, Sorry DVD	CD; DVD	Avex Taiwan
Hong Kong	August 7, 2009	Sorry, Sorry DVD	CD; DVD	Avex Asia

== See also ==
- Sorry, Sorry
  - Sorry, Sorry (Music Video) on YouTube
  - Sorry, Sorry (Music Video - Dance Ver.) on YouTube
  - Sorry, Sorry (Music Video - Answer Ver.) on YouTube
- It's You
  - It's You (Music Video) on YouTube
  - It's You (Music Video - Dance Ver) on YouTube
  - It's You (Music Video - Drama Ver) on YouTube
