= Sung Min =

Sung Min may refer to:

- Seong-min, Korean given name
- Sung Min (swimmer)
