= It's You (Super Junior song) =

Single by Super Junior

from the album Sorry, Sorry
- Language: Korean
- Released: May 11, 2009
- Studio: SM Concert Hall Studio (Seoul)
- Genre: Dance-pop
- Length: 3:51
- Label: SM
- Composer: E-Tribe
- Lyricist: E-Tribe
- Producer: E-Tribe

Super Junior singles chronology
"Sorry, Sorry" (2009)	"It's You" (2009)	"Bonamana" (2010)

Music video
- "It's You" on YouTube

"It's You" (Korean: 너라고; RR: Neorago) is a digital single by Korean boy band Super Junior. It is the second promotional single for the group's third studio album Sorry, Sorry and was digitally released on May 11, 2009. Three new tracks were added to the single on May 14, 2009, the same day as the physical release of the repackaged version of Sorry, Sorry.

This is the last single to feature the full 13-member lineup. Han Geng filled contract termination later that year. Kibum would eventually be focusing on his acting career and was on indefinite hiatus from the group until his eventual departure from SM Entertainment in 2015.

== Composition ==
"It's You" is written, composed and arranged by E-Tribe, the same composer who wrote several chart-topping songs. The collaboration was first announced on April 21, in which the group described the song to be "a mellow but trendy dance song" and very unlike the lively songs that E-Tribe has previously written for female singers. The song incorporates heavy electronic influences to a MIDI sequence, and was expected to earn the same success as the urban funk song "Sorry, Sorry."

It is categorized as a dance song that combines acoustic R&B with retro Euro techno sounds.

== Music video ==
Super Junior members stand at the end of the video

The music video was directed by Cho Soo-hyun and filmed in a studio in Ilsan, Gyeonggi Province, South Korea in late April 2009. It premiered on the evening of May 12, 2009 on Cyworld with a positive reception. The music video was originally planned to be released on the same day as the repackaged album release, but because an unfinished version of it was illegally leaked on the morning of May 12, SM Entertainment decided to push forward the release time to 7 P.M. of that same day. There are slight differences in both versions. In the leaked unedited version, there are more scenes of Han Geng whispering the phrase "it's you" (너라고, Neorago) in Korean, while in the official release, those scenes are replaced with the Super Junior members assembling to their stools. Certain scenes are also shot at different angles, and more special effects are added into the dancing scenes.

A drama version of the music video, which excludes the intercut sequences of choreographed dancing, was released on May 15, 2009. The video opens with a scene of a girl returning her ring to Kibum. A loud heart beat sounds when Kibum painfully walks away with the ring in his hand. Kibum passes by Han Geng, who somberly looks down at his phone. He whispers "It's you, it's you, it's only you for me, it's you" in Korean and walks away. Donghae appears behind him and walks down the street, followed by Kyuhyun who walks after him. Kyuhyun walks past a car parked in a street intersection, and Yesung walks out of the street. Leeteuk appears behind Yesung, playing with a necklace. As he walks toward the end of the street, Siwon hesitantly walks toward a phone booth. Ryeowook rushes past him holding a bouquet of flowers. As he smells the flowers, he whips past Kangin who is sitting down at a table angrily reading a letter. Kyuhyun appears again and quickly unbuttons his jacket, checking the time on his watch. He walks by Eunhyuk, who is spraying graffiti on the wall with the words "Only 4 U." Kangin walks into a coffee shop and passes by Sungmin who is writing a letter. Shindong walks out of the coffee shop, passing by Ryeowook who has been waiting in front of the shop. Ryeowook angrily throws down his bouquet of flowers, looks at his watch, and walks away. He passes by Han Geng, who is emotionally talking through his phone. Han Geng walks past Yesung and Eunhyuk doing a handshake in an alleyway, and Yesung walks past Sungmin, who is now mailing his letter. Kyuhyun quickly walks past Sungmin and passes by Heechul in the middle of the street, who is sitting on his motorcycle and taking off his helmet. The rest of the Super Junior members appear walking by Heechul, and Siwon is now shouting through the phone. He slams the phone back and hits the phone booth. Donghae angrily walks by and steps back as the camera pans toward the rest of the Super Junior members standing behind Heechul. As Heechul whispers the same words Han Geng whispered in the beginning of the video, Kibum holds his ring to his heart and the rest of the members follow while stand at the end of the video.

== Promotion and chart performance ==
On May 9, the full-length single of "It's You" and screen shots of the respective music video were leaked on the internet. Despite the leak, the single was officially released as a digital single on May 11, and quickly became the #1 song on Cyworld after only four hours of release. Two days later, the single reached top 5 on Mnet's Top 300 Chart, ranking #4. The first promotional performance for "It's You" was on May 17, on the SBS music program, Inkigayo. On May 22, "It's You" was performed on Music Bank for the first, followed by the song's first award as #1 song of the week on the Music Bank weekly K-Chart. A week later, the song reached #1 on the Take 7 Chart for Popular Songs. The single also stayed as #1 in Thailand's Channel V Countdown Asia Chart for three consecutive weeks.

On October 7, in a daily countdown by MYX Philippines, "It's You" peaked at #1, with only a 0.53% lead with Taylor Swift's You Belong With Me, which ranked #2 on that day. While on MYX's international countdown, "It's You" peaked at #2, their highest ranking song on MYX, after "Sorry, Sorry" peaked only at #6 on the said countdown. It is also the 12th most voted international video on MYX's international year-end countdown, and 19th overall most voted music video of the year also in MYX's hit year-end countdown in 2009 (and the 3rd most voted K-Pop music video, second being "Nobody" by the Wonder Girls and the first being "Fire", by 2NE1).

The track is listed at number 11 on Hit Fm Taiwan's Hit Fm Annual Top 100 Singles Chart for 2009.

== Track listing ==
No.	Title	Lyrics	Music	Arrangement	Length
1.	"It's You" (너라고; Neorago)	E-Tribe	E-Tribe	E-Tribe	3:51
2.	"She Wants It" (그녀는 위험해; Geunyeoneun wiheomhae; 'She is dangerous')	Young-hu Kim	Sean Alexander (Avenue 52); Jimmy Andrew Richard; Gabe Lopez; Michael Snyder	Avenue 52	3:55
3.	"Love Disease" (사랑이 죽는 병; Sarangi jungneun byeong; 'Love is a dying disease')	Choi Whee-sung	Jimmy Burney; Sean Alexander (Avenue 52); Pascal Guyon	Avenue 52	3:3-
4.	"Love U More" (첫번째 이야기; Cheotbeonjjae iyagi; 'First story')	Kim Ryeo-wook; Lee Sung-min	Kim Ryeo-wook	Kim Ryeo-wook; Kenzie	3:08
Total length:					14:25

== Music show awards ==
Program	Date
Music Bank (KBS)	May 22, 2009
Inkigayo (SBS)	June 7, 2009

== Credits and personnel ==
Credits adapted from album's liner notes.

Studio

- SM Concert Hall Studio – recording, mixing
- Sonic Korea – mastering

Personnel

- SM Entertainment – executive producer
- Lee Soo-man – producer
- Super Junior – vocals, background vocals
- E-Tribe – producer, lyrics, composition, arrangement, vocal directing
- Ener-One – background vocals
- Go Myung-jae – guitar
- Nam Koong-jin – recording, mixing
- Jeon Hoon – mastering

== Release history ==
Release dates and formats
Region	Date	Format(s)	Distributor
Various	May 11, 2009	Digital download; streaming	SM
