= Pascal Guyon =

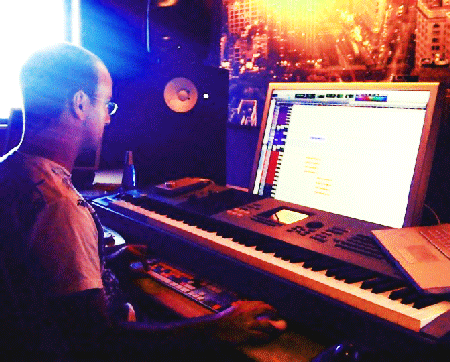

Background information
- Origin: France
- Genres: Pop, Classical, R&B, Latin, Hip Hop, Jazz
- Instrument: Piano
- Years active: 1999-present
- Website: pascalguyon.org

Pascal Guyon is a French musician, producer, songwriter and mixing engineer who contributed to three Grammy nominations. Guyon is also a coder and public speaker.

== Life and career ==
Guyon started his professional career as a mixing engineer at seventeen years old. He became a classical and jazz piano teacher by nineteen, teaching at two French conservatories while performing with various bands. Pascal started collaborating with international artists such as Timbaland's artist D.O.E. and K-pop boy band TVXQ in 2008.

Guyon worked on Spirit by Leona Lewis and The Point of It All by Anthony Hamilton within his first two weeks in Los Angeles. He has been making music for elite artists and brands all over the world : Raheem DeVaughn, Rostrum Records, Wynter Gordon, Jane Zhang, Kim Tae-yeon, Hyperloop Transportation Technologies.

In 2015, Guyon was a member of the judging panel for Music Tech Fest's hackathon in Scandinavia along with Owsla artist Phonat. Pascal occasionally writes songs with Forbes 30 Under 30 Nanxi Liu, co-founder and CEO of Enplug.

In 2017, Guyon programmed a "proof of concept" educational video game allowing instant monetization at no cost to the player by leveraging blockchain technology.

In 2020, Guyon was a featured speaker at Campus Digital organised by Le Barreau De Paris, an event about the future of the music industry, law and technology.

Pascal has been collaborating with Hyperloop Transportation Technologies as a software developer.

== Selected music credits ==
- 2020 "How Can I Fail" by NoTrace, featured in the NBA 2K21 video game
- 2020 "Fighter's Spirit" by NoTrace, featured in the NBA 2K21 video game
- 2020 "Making a Monster Out Of Me" by Katherine McNamara featured in the TV show The Stand (2020 miniseries) on CBS All Access
- 2017 "Rescue Me" by Kim Tae-yeon
- 2014 "Vadonatúj érzés" by Gigi Radics
- 2014 "Get Out Of My Life" by Jane Zhang
- 2011 "Putting it Out There" by Wynter Gordon
- 2011 "Blow Your Speakers" by Big Time Rush
- 2009 "Why I like you" & "Love Disease" by Super Junior
- 2009 "Turn It Out" by D.O.E., The Marc Pease Experience
- 2008 "You're my melody" by TVXQ, album Mirotic
- 2008 "She's Gone" by Anthony Hamilton
- 2007 "Here I Am" by Leona Lewis
