= Don't Don =

Studio album by Super Junior
- Released: September 20, 2007
- Recorded: 2006–2007
- Studios: Rui (Seoul); Silk (Seoul); SM Blue Ocean (Seoul); SM Concert Hall (Seoul); SM Booming System (Seoul); SM Yellow Tail (Seoul); T (Seoul)
- Genres: Pop; R&B; alternative rock; dance
- Length: 65:17
- Language: Korean
- Labels: SM; Avex Asia
- Producer: Lee Soo-man

Super Junior chronology
Twins (2005)	Don't Don (2007)	Sorry, Sorry (2009)

Singles from Don't Don
- 1. "Don't Don" Released: September 20, 2007; 2. "Marry U" Released: November 5, 2007

Don't Don (Korean: 돈 돈!) is the second studio album by South Korean boy band Super Junior. It was released in South Korea through SM Entertainment on September 20, 2007. It marked the first album as thirteen members with the addition of Kyuhyun a year prior. Stylistically, Don't Don encompasses various musical styles such as alternative rock, modern R&B and retro dance-pop, with almost all tracks in the album containing string sections. Two singles were spawned from the album: the title track "Don't Don" and "Marry U".

The album was commercially successful, selling 60,000 copies within the first week of release and 164,058 copies by the end of year. It was the second best-selling album in South Korea during 2007, with the first being SG Wannabe's The Sentimental Chord. Two different repackaged versions, one containing three new tracks with a remix and another containing a remixed track and a DVD, was released on November 5 and November 9, 2007, respectively in South Korea. A digital version of the album was made available on November 27, 2007.

== Background and release ==
When promotions for Super Junior's previous hit single, "U" completed, SM Entertainment announced that the group were processing on the beginning touches for their second full-length album, with an expected November 2006 release. However, due to Heechul's car accident on August 10, 2006, schedules regarding album recordings had to be postponed. Another car accident involving four other members on April 19, 2007, also affected the album schedules. Kyuhyun, the most injured out of the four, was not discharged from the hospital until July 5, 2007.

During a fan-meet in Shanghai on August 26, 2007, Han Geng revealed that recording schedules for the album were finally active and the album would be released in September, which was followed with Shindong's announcement that he would be on a short hiatus from hosting activities to work on the album. It was also announced through media outlets that Kyuhyun would join group activities for the album. A few days later, SM Entertainment released the album's first promotional image, which contains a silhouette of the thirteen members.

On September 13, 2007, the label announced an official date for the album release. Pre-orders began the following the day and ringtones of the tracks were released online on September 19. The official album was released on September 20, 2007.

=== Repackaged versions ===
Two repackaged versions of the album were released a month after the release of the album. The album's second version, the CD repackaged version, was released on November 5, 2007, with four new tracks: "Marry U" (New Ver.), "A Man In Love", "The girl is mine", and "A Man In Love" (Remix). Although the song "Marry U", was included in the original album, the CD repackaged version brought in a new version of the single, which became the album's second single. The remixed version of "A Man In Love" became a semi promo-single for the repackaged album and is one of the group's performance songs. The third album version, the CD+DVD repackaged version, was released on November 9, 2007. Although there are no new tracks added to the CD unlike the second version, an extra DVD is added to the album which contains music videos and behind-the-scene clips behind the production of the album.

== Composition ==
The title track "Don't Don" was chosen the album's first single. Transliterated to "Money, Money! (Don't Don)", the title is a pun, playing with the words "don," (돈), which means money, and "donda" (돈다), which means to go insane. "Don't Don" is introduced as a genre of SMP (SM Music Performance), a genre invented by the company, that consists of the strong mix of R&B, rock, rap, and hip hop. The musical style of "Don't Don" has the combination of heavy guitar riffs, fast drum rhythms, electric guitar, a violin solo, and other musical instruments that make the single a rare musical. "Marry U" was chosen to be the second single; it is a medium-tempo R&B ballad, reviving a classic image in contrast to the dark image of their first single. The rest of the album consists of soft ballads, string section focus, retro R&B, and 1980s style dance songs, marking a stylistic shift from their first album. However, the trend of bubblegum pop still remains in the album, such as the second track, "Sapphire Blue."

Many members contributed in the production of the album. Yesung, Ryeowook, Kyuhyun were active as background vocalists while Eunhyuk, one of the main rappers of the group, was in charge of most of the rap lyrics in the album. Leeteuk, Sungmin, Eunhyuk, and Donghae also wrote the lyrics for the dance/pop song, "I am," arranged by Yoon Jongshin. Famous musicians like Yoon Jongshin, Kim Johan, Kim Youngho, Hwang Sungjae, Kim Changhyun, etc. also participated in the production of the album.

== Album packaging and image ==
The packaging and image of Don't Don is darker than that of their first album. Don't Don came to stores with thirteen different covers, each cover featuring a different member. All thirteen covers of the members are included within the CD package, and the covers can be changed anytime. First impressions of the album were critical but well-accepted, as Super Junior transformed into a much edgier image than from their previous image in "U." The members sported bleached hair and had astounding hairstyles, which were influences from the combination of punk fashion and hip hop fashion. Some of the members also imprinted large temporary tattoos on their skin, which surrounded the arms, back, and stomach.

With the release of the album's second version, the group quickly transformed to a classical image to complement the second single, "Marry U". Hairstyles were slightly modified and their hair color were darker. The album's third version revived the group with a modern and fashionable boy band image.

== Commercial performance ==
Don't Don debuted at number one on the MIAK monthly album chart, selling more than Lee Soo-young's and Wheesung's new albums that were released at least two weeks prior. The album sold 66,678 copies within the first month of release and 164,058 copies by the end of December, making it the second best-selling album of 2007. The album also experienced success in Taiwan, peaking atop the Five Music J-pop/K-pop Chart and the G-Music J-pop Chart in Taiwan within the first week of release. The album also debuted at number tree on the G-Music Combo Chart, beating Taiwanese boy band K One who also released their album during the same week. Don't Don became the highest charting Korean album in Taiwan at the time.

== Promotion ==
Super Junior's first performance for Don't Don was on September 21, 2007, performing the first single "Don't Don" on KBS's Music Bank. It was their first performance in which the group performed together as thirteen after a whole year. Promotions for "Don't Don" lasted almost three months and aside Music Bank, Super Junior also performed on other music programs, such as on SBS's Inkigayo and Mnet's M Countdown. Not long after the release of the second single, "Marry U", Super Junior became co-hosts of a new SBS variety program, Explorers of the Human Body along with Shin Dongyup. The new program ranked as SBS's most-viewed program each Sunday. However, the first season quickly ended with thirteen episodes in February 2008 due to Super Junior's busy schedule with their first concert tour, Super Show.

== Accolades ==
Year	Award	Category	Result	Ref.
2007	Golden Disc Awards	Album Bonsang (Main Prize)	Won	
2007	Golden Disc Awards	Album Daesang (Grand Prize) (Note: Albums that won Bonsang award are automatically nominated for Daesang award)	Nominated	

== Track listings ==
Don't Don Digital and CD version track listing
No.	Title	Lyrics	Music	Arrangement	Length
1.	"Don't Don" (돈 돈!; Don Don!; lit. 'Money Money!')	Kim Sung-soo; Yoo Young-jin	Groovie K; Yoo Young-jin	Yoo Young-jin	4:11
2.	"Sapphire Blue" (소원이 있나요; Sowon-i Innayo; lit. 'Do you have a wish?')	Taehoon	Michael Scott Hartung; Tommy La Verdi	Ahn Ik-su	3:24
3.	"You're My Endless Love" (말하자면; Malhajamyeon; lit. 'As it were')	Kwon Yoon-jung; Young-hu Kim	Young-hu Kim	Young-hu Kim	4:32
4.	"Hate U, Love U" (미워; Miwo; lit. 'I hate you')	Kim Jeong-bae	Kenzie	Kenzie	3:47
5.	"Disco Drive"	Yoon Jong-shin	Yoon Jong-shin; Postino	Postino	4:07
6.	"Marry U^{[a]}"	Kwon Yoon-jung	LeeOn	LeeOn	3:18
7.	"I Am"	Sungmin; Donghae; Eunhyuk; Leeteuk	Greg Lynch	Kenzie	3:30
8.	"She's Gone" (사랑이 떠나다; Sarang-i Tteonada; lit. 'Love is gone')	Kwon Yoon-jung	Hwang Seong-je	Hwang Seong-je	4:38
9.	"Missin' U"	Shiro	Ken Ingwersen	G-High (Monotree); Lee Joo-hyoung (MonoTree); Hwang Seong-je	3:43
10.	"Mirror" (거울; Geo-ul)	Young Sky	Young Sky	Young Sky	4:01
11.	"Our Love" (우리들의 사랑; Urideul-ui Sarang)	Yoo Jae-ha	Yoo Jae-ha	Yoo Jae-ha; Kenzie	3:48
12.	"Midnight Fantasy"	Park Chang-hyun	Park Chang-hyun	Park Chang-hyun	4:00
13.	"Thank You"	Naco	Johan Kim	Don Spike	3:35
14.	"Song for You" (아주 먼 옛날; Aju Meon Yennal; lit. 'A long time ago') (Bonus track)	Cheon Tae-hyuk	Cheon Tae-hyuk	Young-hu Kim	3:40
Total length:					54:30

Don't Don Repackage track listing
No.	Title	Lyrics	Music	Arrangement	Length
4.	"Marry U" (New version)	Kwon Yoon-jung	LeeOn	LeeOn	3:18
5.	"A Man in Love" (갈증; Galjeung; lit. 'Thirst') (Original version)	Yoo Young-jin	Yoo Young-jin	Yoo Young-jin	3:32
10.	"The Girl is Mine" (마지막 승부; Majimak Seungbu; lit. 'The last match')	Kim Jeong-bae	Kenzie	Kenzie	3:17
16.	"A Man In Love" (갈증; Galjeung; lit. 'Thirst') (Remix version)	Yoo Young-jin	Yoo Young-jin	Yoo Young-jin	4:35
17.	"Song for You" (아주 먼 옛날; Aju Meon Yennal; lit. 'A long time ago') (Bonus track)	Cheon Tae-hyuk	Cheon Tae-hyuk	Young-hu Kim	3:40
Total length:					65:17

Don't Don Japanese edition track listing
No.	Title	Lyrics	Music	Arrangement	Length
18.	"Marry U" (Japanese version)	c.close; Kwon Yoon-jung	LeeOn	LeeOn	3:16

=== DVD ===
1. "Marry U" jacket sketch
2. Prologue
3. Relay Talk
4. Member Personal Story! "Talk to Myself!"
5. Epilogue
6. "Don't Don" MV Making Film
7. "Don't Don" MV
8. "Marry U" MV Making Film

Notes ^{^[a]} – CD version has the New version

== Personnel ==
Credits are adapted from the album liner notes. The tracks numbering is according to the repackage and Japanese edition of the album.

Musicians

- Super Junior – vocals, background vocals (1, 5, 16)
  - Leeteuk – lyrics (8)
  - Heechul – background vocals (16)
  - Han Geng
  - Yesung – background vocals (4, 7, 8, 9, 10, 11, 12, 13, 15, 18)
  - Kangin
  - Shindong – background vocals (16)
  - Sungmin – lyrics (8), background vocals (4, 8, 10, 18)
  - Eunhyuk – lyrics (8), rap making (2, 3, 4, 6, 11, 13, 14, 17, 18), rap lyrics (2, 3, 4, 6, 11, 13, 14, 17, 18)
  - Donghae – lyrics (8), rap making (4, 11, 17, 18), rap lyrics (4, 11, 17, 18)
  - Siwon
  - Ryeowook – background vocals (4, 7, 8, 9, 10, 11, 12, 13, 17, 18)
  - Kibum
  - Kyuhyun – background vocals (4, 7, 8, 9, 10, 12, 17, 18)

Additional musicians

- Yoo Young-jin – lyrics (1, 5, 16), composition (1, 5, 16), arrangement (1, 5, 16), rearrangement (16), director (1), rap making (1, 5, 16), rap lyrics (1, 5, 16) voice modeling guitar (1, 5, 16), violin conductor (1), background vocals (1, 5, 16), acoustic guitar (5, 16), remix (16)
- Tae Hoon – lyrics (2)
- Young-hu Kim – lyrics (3), composition (3), arrangement (3, 17), background vocals (3, 17)
- Kwon Yun-jung – lyrics (3, 4, 9, 18), director (18)
- Yoon Jong-shin – lyrics (6), composition (6)
- Kim Jeong-bae – lyrics (7, 10), guitar (3, 7, 8, 10, 12)
- Cho Jun-young – lyrics (11), composition (11), arrangement (11)
- Yoo Jae-ha – lyrics (12), composition (12)
- Shiro – lyrics (13)
- Park Chang-hyun – lyrics (14), composition (14), arrangement (14), background vocals (14)
- Seong Nak-ho – lyrics (15)
- Cheon Tae-hyuk – lyrics (17), composition (17)
- c.close – Japanese lyrics (18)
- Michael Scott Hartung – composition (2)
- Thomas Charles La Verdi – composition (2)
- Lee Jea-myoung – composition (4, 18), arrangement (4, 18)
- Lee Keun-ho – composition (6)
- Kenzie – composition (7, 10), arrangement (7, 8, 10, 12), additional composition (12), additional lyrics (12)
- Greg Lynch – composition (8)
- Hwang Sung-jae – composition (9), arrangement (9, 13), keyboard (13)
- Ken Ingwersen – composition (13)
- Kim Jo-han – composition (15), background vocals (15)
- An Ik-su – arrangement (2), guitar (2)
- Lee Jun-ho – arrangement (6), all sources programing (6)
- Lee Ju-hyong – arrangement (13), background vocals (13), synth (13)
- Yoo Ji-sang – arrangement (13), rhythm (13)
- Kim Min-soo – arrangement (15)
- Badook – rap making (1), rap lyrics (1)
- Hoonyhoon – rap making (5, 16), rap lyrics (5, 16), background vocals (5, 16)
- Groovie.K – electric guitar (1), acoustic guitar (5, 16)
- Henry – violin (1)
- Lee Soo-man – violin conductor (1)
- Sam Lee – guitar (4, 18)
- Lee Sung-ryul – guitar (6, 13)
- Hong Jun-ho – guitar (9, 15)
- Ko Tae-yong – guitar (11, 14, 17)
- Min Jae-hyun – bass (7, 8, 10, 12)
- Jeong Jae-il – bass (9)
- Lee Sang-min – drum (9, 15)
- Song Young-joo – piano (9)
- Gil Eun-kyung – keyboard (4, 18) piano (7)
- Jang Hyo-suk – alto saxophone (6)
- Moon Ji-hwan – background vocals (2)
- Kim Hyeon-a – background vocals (5, 16)
- Kang Tae-woo – background vocals (6)
- Byun Jae-won – background vocals (9, 13)
- Jang Jeong-woo – background vocals (11)
- Chun Dan-bi – background vocals (14)
- Kim Hyo-soo – background vocals (15)
- Shim Sang-won – strings arrangement and conductor (3, 8)
- Lee Na-il – strings arrangement and conductor (4, 7, 9, 12, 13, 18)
- Shin Min – strings arrangement and conductor (11)
- K-Strings – strings (3, 4, 7, 8, 9, 11, 12, 13, 18)
- Lee Ju-myong – vocal and chorus director (13)
- Toshio Fujiwara – director (18)

Technical personnel

- Lee Soo-man – producer
- Jeon Hoon at Sonic Korea – mastering (all)
- Hiroshi Kawasaki (FLAIR) – mastering (18)
- Yoo Young-jin at SM Booming System – recording, mixing
- Lee Sung-ho at SM Yellow Tail, SM Blue Ocean and SM Concert Hall – recording, mixing
- Nam Koong-jin at SM Concert Hall – recording, mixing
- Park Chang-hyun at SM Yellow Tail – recording
- Kat at SM Blue Ocean – recording
- Hwang Sung-jae at SM Blue Ocean and BJJ – recording
- Heo Jeong-hoe (KAT) at SM Blue Ocean – recording
- Young-hu Kim at SM Blue Ocean and SM Concert Hall – recording
- Kenzie at SM Blue Ocean – recording
- Park Kyung-joon at Rui – recording
- Kim Cheol-sun at Rui – recording
- Cho Chang-hee at Music Tower – recording
- Um Chan-yong at Lead Sound – recording
- Hong Seung-heun at Chungeum – recording
- Jang Min at Silk – recording
- Kim Min-hee at Silk – recording
- Oh Seung-geun at T-Studio – recording
- Kim Jo-han at DGHETTO – recording
- Hideaki Jinbu – recording
- Masahiro Kawata – recording

== Charts ==
All charts are derived from offline sales only.

=== Weekly charts ===
Chart (2007, 2011)	Peak position
Japanese Albums (Oricon)	55
South Korean Albums (Gaon)	16
Taiwan Combo Albums (G-Music)	3
Taiwan East Asia Albums (G-Music)	1

=== Monthly charts ===
Chart (2007)	Peak position
South Korean Albums (RIAK)	1

=== Year-end charts ===
Chart (2007)	Position
South Korean Albums (RIAK)	2

== Release history ==
Aside South Korea, Don't Don was re-released in other countries under different labels.

Version	Region	Date	Format	Label
A	South Korea	September 20, 2007	CD, cassette	SM Entertainment
A	Thailand	October 2007	CD	GMM Grammy
A	Taiwan	October 19, 2007	CD	Avex Taiwan
A	Hong Kong	October 25, 2007	CD	Avex Asia
A	China	March 2008	CD	Sky Music
A	Japan	May 2008	CD	Rhythm Zone
B	South Korea	November 5, 2007	CD	SM Entertainment
B	Taiwan	December 7, 2007	CD	Avex Taiwan
C	South Korea	November 9, 2007	CD+DVD	SM Entertainment
C	Taiwan	December 7, 2007	CD+DVD	Avex Taiwan
C	Philippines	May 14, 2010	CD+DVD	Universal Records
4	South Korea	November 27, 2007	Digital download	SM Entertainment
Japanese edition	Japan	February 25, 2009	CD+DVD	Rhythm Zone

== See also ==
- Don't Don
  - Don't Don (Music Video) on YouTube
- Marry U
  - Marry U (Music Video) on YouTube
