= Sung-min =

Name list

- Hangul: 성민
- RR: Seongmin
- MR: Sŏngmin

Sung-min, also spelled Seong-min, is a Korean given name. Sung-min was the eighth-most popular name for baby boys in South Korea in 1970, rising to second place in 1980, where it remained in 1990.

People with this name include:

Entertainers

- Lee Sung-min (actor) (born 1968), South Korean actor
- Hong Seong-min (born 1976), stage name Hong Kyung-min, South Korean singer and actor
- Lee Sung-min (1985), stage name Clara Lee, actress and model active in South Korea
- Lee Sung-min (singer) (born 1986), South Korean singer, member of boy band Super Junior
- Choi Sung-min (actor) (born 1995), South Korean singer and actor, member of boy band Speed
- Ahn Seongmin (born 2003), South Korean singer, member of Cravity

Footballers

- Kim Sung-min (footballer born 1981), South Korean football goalkeeper
- An Sung-min (born 1985), South Korean football midfielder
- Kim Sung-min (footballer born 1985), South Korean football forward
- Yoon Soung-min (born 1985), South Korean football midfielder
- Lee Sung-min (footballer) (born 1986), South Korean football striker
- Ha Sung-min (born 1987), South Korean football midfielder
- Jung Sung-min (born 1989), South Korean football forward
- Hwang Sung-min (born 1991), South Korean football goalkeeper

Other sportspeople

- Cho Sung-min (1973–2013), South Korean baseball player
- Moon Sung-min (born 1986), South Korean volleyball player
- Kim Sung-min (judoka) (born 1987), South Korean judoka
- Cho Sung-min (sailor) (born 1987), South Korean sailor

Other

- Chang Sŏng-min (born 1963), South Korean politician

== See also ==
- List of Korean given names
- Yoo Seong-min (유승민; born 1958), South Korean politician
