= Marry U =

2007 single by Super Junior

Single by Super Junior

from the album Don't Don
- Released: September 20, 2007
- Studio: SM Yellow Tail; SM Concert Hall; Lead Sound
- Genre: Pop; R&B
- Length: 3:16
- Label: SM; Rhythm Zone
- Composer: Lee Jae-myung
- Lyricists: Kwon Yoon-jung; C.close; Eunhyuk; Donghae
- Producer: Lee Jae-myung

Super Junior singles chronology
"Don't Don" (2007)	"Marry U" (2007)	"U / Twins" (2008)

Music video
- "Marry U" on YouTube

"Marry U" is a song by South Korean boy band Super Junior. The song is produced by Lee Jae-myung and co-written with Kwon Yoon-jung as the second single for Super Junior's second album, Don't Don. The song is a combination of soft contemporary R&B, simple pop ballad melodies, and also with elements of jazz and rap.

A new version of the ballad with extra vocals of Han Geng and Shindong was released in a repackaged version of Don't Don on November 5, 2007, which also became the promotional release of the single. The Japanese version was released on November 26, 2008, and peaked at number 20 on the Oricon Singles Chart.

== Background and release ==
"Marry U" was originally track 6 from the original album, Don't Don, which was released on September 20, 2007. However, a new version of "Marry U" was released on the first repackaged version of the album on November 5, 2007. "Marry U" is a light R&B ballad with soft rapping and gentle vocalization and harmonization. The theme of the song involves a sweet proposal and a confession of love, with repeating imagery of a bride and groom walking towards the moons and stars. The lyrics support long-lasting love and describes that although growing older, the love will never leave.

The only difference between the first and second version of "Marry U" are the switching of solo positions. In the original version, Han Geng, Shindong, and Kibum do not have solos. However, Han Geng and Shindong gained solos in the second version. Han Geng sings Heechul's original solo and Shindong raps to the second half of Eunhyuk's second solo. Heechul's solo is switched to rapping to the second half of Eunhyuk's first solo.

=== Japanese version ===
In Japan, the song served as the unofficial third CD single and the second special single by Super Junior. The single comes with two different jackets; the first of the jackets contains a CD and a DVD of making-of footage while the second jacket contains only a CD with a photobook. The single peaked at number 9 on the Oricon Daily Chart in its first day of release. The single is a compiled single with a total of four tracks, all which are title tracks from Super Junior, Super Junior-T, Super Junior-K.R.Y, and Super Junior-Happy.

== Music video ==
Different from previous works from the group, a majority of the music video is done with high-definite CG artwork effects instead of actual scenery. Super Junior filmed the video wearing white tuxedos, surrounded by green screen.

The music video begins with Super Junior sleeping on top of a graphical city, with Eunhyuk rapping, which is then followed by Heechul's rap. As Heechul continues rapping, the video merges into the city, with a yellow taxi cab driving in the streets. A girl, played by Girls' Generation's Yoona exits the taxi and arrives in front of a circus, and enters it. As the girl watches the performances, the camera closes onto her face and her head breaks apart, revealing a girl sitting on her bed in her room.

Super Junior appears between intervals every once in a while, singing and rapping to the song. As Donghae raps, the camera shows the girl sleeping on her desk. The video then showed water droplets growing into trees of ice, emitting a bright glow. A piece of outstretched cloth hovers above the tree, and hot air balloons, with phones attached to them, hang above the cloth, with the girl staring at it. The girl goes back into the taxi and arrived at the concert, watching Super Junior dance to the song in a fantasy-like surrounding.

Throughout the video, the scenery used subtly displays a story of which someone is holding a concert for a former lover, confessing love and re-committing themselves to each other. Unlike previous promo singles from Super Junior, "Marry U" is a mid-tempo ballad, and the song does not require extremely difficult dance choreography like what the group's previous singles required. In the first half of the music video, Super Junior is mainly shown sitting on high platforms singing to the song, with shots of the girl and also scenery composed of CG artworks. At the end of the video where the girl sits down to enjoy the group dancing, the group dances in a fantasy-like surrounding, with slow and gentle choreography. The ending scene shows the girl smiling and nodding, a diamond ring glinting on her finger.

== Promotion and reception ==
"Marry U" became the main title of Super Junior's first mini concert, Super Junior Marry U Mini Concert. The mini concert had two shifts, one in the afternoon and one in the night. The concert was held in Seoul Shindolim Technomart on November 15, 2007. Taking the theme of a marriage proposal, each of the thirteen members prepared rings to give to certain lucky fans, presenting it to them like how they would propose to their girlfriends. "Marry U" is also the first single from Don't Don to be performed overseas as Super Junior performed this song at the 2007 Tencent Stars Magnificent Ceremony in Beijing, China on November 17, 2007. Unlike previous performances where they danced to "Marry U", Super Junior performed the song sitting on bar stools.

Despite wide promotional uses of the single, "Marry U" did not meet the achievements like what the album's first single, "Don't Don," had set. The single failed to receive any music program awards.

== Track listing ==
CD

1. "Marry U" / Super Junior
2. "Rokkugo" / Super Junior-T
3. "歩みを止めて" / Super Junior-K.R.Y.
4. "Cooking? Cooking!" (料理王) / Super Junior-Happy

DVD

1. "Marry U" / Super Junior
2. "Rokkugo" / Super Junior-T
3. "Cooking? Cooking!" (料理王) / Super Junior-Happy
4. Making of Music Video (初回盤のみ)

== Credits and personnel ==
Credits adapted from album's liner notes.

Studio

- SM Yellow Tail Studio – recording, mixing
- SM Concert Hall Studio – recording
- Lead Sound – recording
- Sonic Korea – mastering

Personnel

- SM Entertainment – executive producer
- Lee Soo-man – producer
- Super Junior – vocals
  - Yesung – background vocals
  - Sungmin – background vocals
  - Eunhyuk – Korean lyrics
  - Donghae – Korean lyrics
  - Ryeowook – background vocals
  - Kyuhyun – background vocals
- Kwon Yoon-jung – Korean lyrics
- c.close – Japanese lyrics
- Lee Jae-myung – producer, composition, arrangement
- Sam Lee – guitar
- Gil Eun-kyung – keyboards
- Nile Lee – strings conducting, strings arrangement
- K-Strings – strings
- Lee Seong-ho – recording, mixing
- Nam Koong-jin – recording
- Eom Chan-yong – recording
- Jeon Hoon – mastering

== Charts ==
Chart (2008)	Peak position
Japan Singles (Oricon)	20
