= U (song) =

2006 song by Super Junior

- Korean single cover

Single by Super Junior
- Language: Korean; Chinese; Japanese
- Released: May 25, 2006
- Recorded: 2006
- Studio: BJ; Root Lab; SM Blue Ocean (Seoul)
- Genre: K-pop; dance
- Length: 3:45
- Label: SM; Avex Taiwan; Rhythm Zone
- Composers: Ken Ingwersen; Kevin Simm
- Lyricists: Tae Hoon; Eunhyuk
- Producer: Hwang Sung-jae

Super Junior singles chronology
"Miracle" (2006)	"U" (2006)	"Dancing Out" (2006)

Alternative cover
- Taiwanese special edition cover

Audio sample
- file; help

"U" is a song recorded in multiple languages by South Korean boy group Super Junior, with the original Korean version released through SM Entertainment on May 25, 2006. A CD single was released in South Korea on June 7 and peaked at number one on the monthly MIAK album chart in June 2006, selling copies over 83,000 by July 2007. The song won five first place awards on South Korean music programs.

"U" received additional releases in Mandarin and Japanese; the Mandarin version of "U" was released as a special Taiwan edition EP through Avex Taiwan on October 4, 2006. In Japan, it was released as a double A-side single titled "U" / "Twins" through Rhythm Zone on July 9, 2008, with the Japanese version of "U" included in the limited edition release. The single peaked at number four on the Oricon Singles Chart and sold over 21,000 copies in Japan.

Super Junior's Mandopop subgroup Super Junior-M released a cover of "U" on April 8, 2008. It served as the subgroup's debut single and marked the second version recorded in Mandarin and third remake of "U". The lyrics were altered from the previous versions with the addition of new jazz swing style instrumentations.

== Background and release ==
Prior to "U", Super Junior was known for their member line-up, a concept very similar to Japanese girl group Morning Musume. Certain members of Super Junior's first generation were to be switched out and new members were to be added, which would form a second Super Junior generation. However, after the addition of the thirteenth member, Kyuhyun, the group ended their status as a project group and began to release productions as a group with permanent status. "U" is Kyuhyun's debut single.

"U" was made available for download on May 25, 2006, via Super Junior's official website. The second track from the single, "Endless Moment", became available for download four days later. "U" had over 400,000 downloads within five hours of release and ultimately exceeded 1.7 million downloads with 12 days, crashing the server.

Composed by Norwegian composer Ken Ingwersen and British musician Kevin Simm with the arrangement of Korean musician Hwang Sung-jae, the song was promoted to be a song of "pure pop and dance" with contemporary R&B influences and harmonization. The rap lyrics of the song were written by Eunhyuk, in which the rap is divided to two solos, the first half for Eunhyuk and the second half for Kibum. Donghae also rapped in the background of Kibum's solo. The song lyrics was written by Tae Hoon, who also wrote the song lyrics for another Super Junior song, Dancing Out.

Several remixed versions of "U" were performed, but none of them were released as official singles. One remixed version of the song contains a dance bridge in the middle of the song right before the rap, and another version had the song completely mixed, creating a different pop vibe throughout the whole song.

== Music video ==
The music video for "U" contains only scenes of the Super Junior members performing their group dance. Yoona, later part of fellow SM Entertainment group Girls' Generation, provides the only female role in the music video. The four-minute video mainly consists of the thirteen members performing their choreographed dance. Much popping, sliding, and waving were used in the performance, like many of Super Junior's other street dancing techniques. Chest movements and hip movements are heavily used and the pelvic thrust is also used in the dance, which became a famous action in future "U" parody dances. The music video on SM Town's YouTube channel, originally uploaded on September 28, 2009, was remastered in high definition and in 4K on January 5, 2022.

== Reception ==
"U" received five first place music program awards on SBS's Inkigayo and Mnet's M Countdown. Super Junior won their first award since their debut on Inkigayo on June 25, 2006, and received two more awards on the program in the following weeks. On July 6, they received their first win on M Countdown. Before promotions for "U" ended, "Dancing Out" was released on July 23, 2006, as part of SM Town's annual summer album, grabbing two awards as soon as it was released. Commercially, "U" peaked at number one on the monthly MIAK album chart and sold 83,010 copies by 2007. The Taiwanese edition of "U" peaked at number five on the Five Music J-pop/K-pop Chart of Taiwan and charted in the top ten for six weeks. At the 2006 Mnet KM Music Festival on November 25, Super Junior won Best New Group while "U" received a nomination for Best Dance Performance.

== Accolades ==
Awards and nominations
Year	Award	Category	Result	Ref.
2006	Golden Disc Awards	Popular Music Video Award	Won	
2006	Mnet KM Music Festival	Best New Group	Won	
2006	Mnet KM Music Festival	Best Dance Performance	Nominated	
2007	MTV Video Music Awards Japan	Best Buzz – South Korea	Nominated	

Music program awards
Program	Date	Ref.
Inkigayo	June 25, 2006	
Inkigayo	July 9, 2006	
Inkigayo	July 16, 2006	
M Countdown	July 6, 2006	
M Countdown	July 20, 2006	

== Track listing ==
Korean CD single
No.	Title	Lyrics	Music	Arrangement	Length
1.	"U"	Tae Hoon; Eunhyuk	Ken Ingwersen; Kevin Simm	Hwang Sung-jae	3:45
2.	"Endless Moment"	Jo Yoon-kyung	Anders Wrethov; Elin Wrethov	Ahn Ik-soo	3:38
3.	"Lovely Day"	Eunhyuk; Park Chang-hyun	Park Chang-hyun	Park Chang-hyun; Yeom Chul-hee	3:02
Total length:					10:25

Taiwanese special edition EP
No.	Title	Length
1.	"U" (就是你) (Mandarin version)	3:45
2.	"Dancing Out"	3:43
3.	"U" (就是你) (Korean version)	3:45
4.	"Endless Moment" (無盡的時刻)	3:48
5.	"Lovely Day" (美好的一天)	3:02
6.	"U" (Instrumental)	3:45
7.	"Endless Moment" (無盡的時刻) (Instrumental)	3:45
8.	"Lovely Day" (美好的一天) (Instrumental)	3:45
Total length:		29:18

DVD – Taiwanese special edition
No.	Title	Length
1.	"U" (就是妳) (Music video)
2.	"Dancing Out" (Music video)
3.	"Making of U – Music Video"
Total length:		–

Japanese CD single
No.	Title	Lyrics	Music	Length
1.	"U"	Tae Hoon; Eunhyuk	Ken Ingwersen; Kevin Simm	3:45
2.	"Twins"	Yoo Young-jin	Anders Bagge; Peer Astrom; Reed Vertelney; Michael Berg Andersson; Wayne Hector; Yoo Young-jin	3:38
3.	"Miracle"	Yoon Hyo-sang	Daniel Pandher; Tommy La Verdi	2:56
4.	"Endless Moment"		Anders Wrethov; Elin Wrethov	3:38
5.	"U" (Japanese version) (Limited edition bonus track)		Ken Ingwersen; Kevin Simm	3:45
Total length:				21:49

DVD – Japanese version
No.	Title	Length
1.	"U" (Music video)
2.	"Making of U – Music Video"

== Credits and personnel ==
Credits adapted from U's liner notes.

Studio

- BJJ Studio – recording
- Root Lab – recording
- SM Blue Ocean Studio – recording
- SM Yellow Tail Studio – mixing
- Sonic Korea – mastering

Personnel

- Heo Jeong-hee a.k.a. KAT – recording
- Hong Jun-ho – guitar
- Hwang Sung-jae – producer, arrangement, recording
- Jeon Hoon – mastering
- Ken Ingwersen – composition
- Kevin Simm – composition
- Lee Seong-ho – mixing
- Lee Soo-man – producer
- SM Entertainment – executive producer
- Super Junior – vocals
  - Eunhyuk – Korean lyrics
- Tae Hoon – Korean lyrics
- Yoon Won-kwon – recording

== Charts ==
=== Weekly charts ===
Chart (2008)	Peak position
Japan Singles (Oricon)	4

=== Monthly charts ===
Chart (2006)	Peak position
South Korean Albums (MIAK)	1

== Sales ==
Country	Sales
South Korea	1,700,000 (digital)
South Korea (MIAK)	83,010 (physical)
Japan (Oricon)	21,379 (physical)

== Release history ==
Region	Date	Format(s)	Edition	Label(s)	Ref.
South Korea	May 25, 2006	Digital download	N/A	SM	
South Korea	June 7, 2006	CD single	N/A	SM	
Taiwan	October 4, 2006	CD	Limited deluxe edition	Avex Taiwan	
Taiwan	March 23, 2007	CD	Limited regular edition	Avex Taiwan	
Taiwan	June 15, 2007	CD+VCD	Special edition	Avex Taiwan	
Taiwan	July 13, 2007	CD+DVD	Special edition	Avex Taiwan	
Japan	July 9, 2008	CD, CD+DVD	N/A	Rhythm Zone	

== Super Junior-M version ==
"U"

Single by Super Junior-M

from the album Me
- Released: April 8, 2008
- Recorded: 2008
- Genre: Electropop; dance
- Length: 4:07
- Label: SM; Avex Asia
- Composers: Ken Ingwersen, Kevin Simm
- Lyricist: Yi Zhen (mandarin)

Super Junior-M singles chronology
"U" (2008)	"Me" (2008)

Audio sample
- file; help

"U" is the first promotional single for Super Junior-M, the third official sub-unit of Super Junior. The song and music video were released online in China on April 8, 2008, on the day of Super Junior-M's debut. The song, including the rap, is completely performed in Mandarin, which differs from the previous Mandarin version done by Super Junior, where the rap segment is performed in Korean. Although the lyrics convey a similar meaning, the lyrics of the two Mandarin versions are different.

"U" is one of the twelve tracks featured in Super Junior-M's debut studio album, Me, which was released in April 2008 in China and South Korea, and later throughout Asia in May 2008. Super Junior-M's modified version of "U" contains heavier bass instruments, a closer musical approach to hip hop and jazz. The song also has extra music bridges, such as a violin bridge performed by Henry (reminiscent of Super Junior's Don't Don) and an added dance bridge, which makes the song almost a minute longer than the original Korean release. Super Junior member Yesung appears in the song as a stock vocal as his parts are originally from the original Korean version of "U".

The dance choreography for Super Junior-M's "U" is also completely changed from the original. The choreography contains a variety of styles, such as different elements of street dancing and jazz dance to complement the maturity in the song, which slightly differs the image from the main group. The music video features the now f(x) member and leader Victoria, with her face dominating the mirrors, and the Super Junior-M members searching for her presence.

=== Credits and personnel ===
- Donghae – vocals (main, rap, background)
- Han Geng – vocals (main, chorus, background)
- Henry – vocals (main, rap, chorus, background)
- Ken Ingwersen – composition
- Kevin Simms – composition
- Kyuhyun – vocals (main, chorus, background)
- Ryeowook – vocals (main, chorus, background)
- Siwon – vocals (main, background)
- Yesung – stock background vocal
- Yi Zhen – Chinese lyrics
- Yoo Young-jin – background vocal, arrangement
- Zhou Mi – vocals (main, rap, background)
