= Don't Don (song) =

Single by Super Junior

from the album Don't Don
- Released: September 20, 2007
- Recorded: 2007
- Studio: SM Booming System (Seoul)
- Genre: Rock; dance-pop; R&B; rap
- Length: 4:11
- Label: SM
- Composers: Yoo Young-jin; Groovie K
- Lyricists: Ba Dook; Groovie K; Yoo Young-jin
- Producers: Lee Soo-man; Yoo Young-jin

Super Junior singles chronology
"Full of Happiness" (2007)	"Don't Don" (2007)	"Marry U" (2007)

Audio sample
- file; help

Music video
- "Don't Don" on YouTube

"Don't Don" (돈 돈!; lit. 'Money, Money!'), is an R&B/rock song written by Yoo Young-jin and Groovie K for the South Korean boy band Super Junior, which was released in their second album, Don't Don on September 20, 2007. The group made their first performance on KBS's Music Bank the following day, performing "Don't Don". The song debuted in most South Korean music charts and enjoyed success as part of the top 20 for weeks.

== Song history ==
"Don't Don" is the first track on Don't Don, a song with the music combination of rock, R&B, rap, and dance-pop. The song debuted in the top 20 on most South Korean music charts on the second week of October. Composed, arranged and written by Yoo Young Jin, the song is a type of SMP (SM Music Performance), with the combination of heavy guitar riffs, percussion patterns, and an electronic violin solo. The song features various raps and also a solo violin performance, performed by a Canadian-Chinese SM Entertainment trainee, Henry Lau, who was a member of Super Junior-M until 2018.

"Don't Don", pronounced as don don in Korean, is a play on the words "don", (Korean: 돈), which means money, and "donda", (Korean: 돈다), which means "to go insane". The lyrics speak about how money, hypocrisy, and the change of society has made the world into a twisted and greedy place to live. The lyrics urge listeners to transform the world into a place where the innocence of children can be preserved.

== Music video ==
The dance choreography for the song were choreographed by the members of Super Junior. A mature change in dance style, which includes pelvic thrusting that was first introduced in their last single, "U", robotic dancing, smooth transitions, and an exclusive addition of a solo dance segment presents Super Junior's dramatic change in image. In the music video, the Super Junior members dance in a war-like environment with explosive fire and hot air surrounding them. The members are seen running away from trucks and also jumping over large cracks as if escaping from danger. The music video came out with two versions, the second version with extra shots of Henry Lau, a featured artist, and a large sun hanging in the dark sky near the end of the music video. The theme of the video deals with chaos and confusion, similar to how the lyrics of the song expresses that money has made the world go crazy and become hypocritical. The theme of the video controls a dangerous habitat which sends off a dark message and warning to the audience, which is not any similar to Super Junior's previous music videos where the main theme of the song is not expressed as clearly. Henry Lau plays the violin during the dance break of the music video. Throughout most of the video, only twelve members are seen dancing to most of the choreography. Kyuhyun, due to his car accident injury, appeared only during his solo part.

== Reception ==
"Don't Don" debuted in weak positions at most online charts. It won its first music program award on SBS's Inkigayo on October 21, 2007, a month after its release. "Don't Don" won its second recognition on November 1, 2007 on Mnet's M Countdown, being the number one song of the week along with V.O.S.'s new single, "Everyday". Although the successful sales of Don't Don is reflected from the notability of the first single, "Don't Don" did not win as many achievements as the group's past single, "U".

Music program awards
Program	Date	Ref.
Inkigayo	October 21, 2007	
Music Bank	October 26, 2007	
M Countdown	November 1, 2007	

== Controversy ==
The featuring of Henry Lau, a Canadian-Chinese SM Entertainment trainee who plays the electronic violin during the violin solo segment in the song, created controversies with the fan base of Super Junior. Many fans of Super Junior initially supported Henry after seeing his pre-debut live performance while dancing with the violin at Super Junior's comeback performance on September 21, 2007, but after SM Entertainment announced Henry as part of the soon-to-debut Super Junior-M, a new subgroup of Super Junior, fans became furious with the label for adding a fourteenth member in Super Junior. Some fans begin to bash Henry and had plans to boycott SM Entertainment products. The fans even shouted "Thirteen!" during a solo performance of Henry while performing with Super Junior. However, SM Entertainment stepped up and said that Henry will not be affecting the official Super Junior, and will just be having activities with the subgroup.

== Credits and personnel ==
Credits adapted from album's liner notes.

Studio

- SM Booming System – recording, mixing
- Sonic Korea – mastering

Personnel

- SM Entertainment – executive producer
- Lee Soo-man – producer, violin conducting
- Super Junior – vocals, background vocals
- Yoo Young-jin – producer, lyrics, composition, arrangement, vocal directing, background vocals, voice modeling guitar, violin conducting, recording, mixing
- Groovie K – composition, electric guitar
- Ba Dook – lyrics
- Henry Lau – violin
- Jeon Hoon – mastering
