= By2 discography =

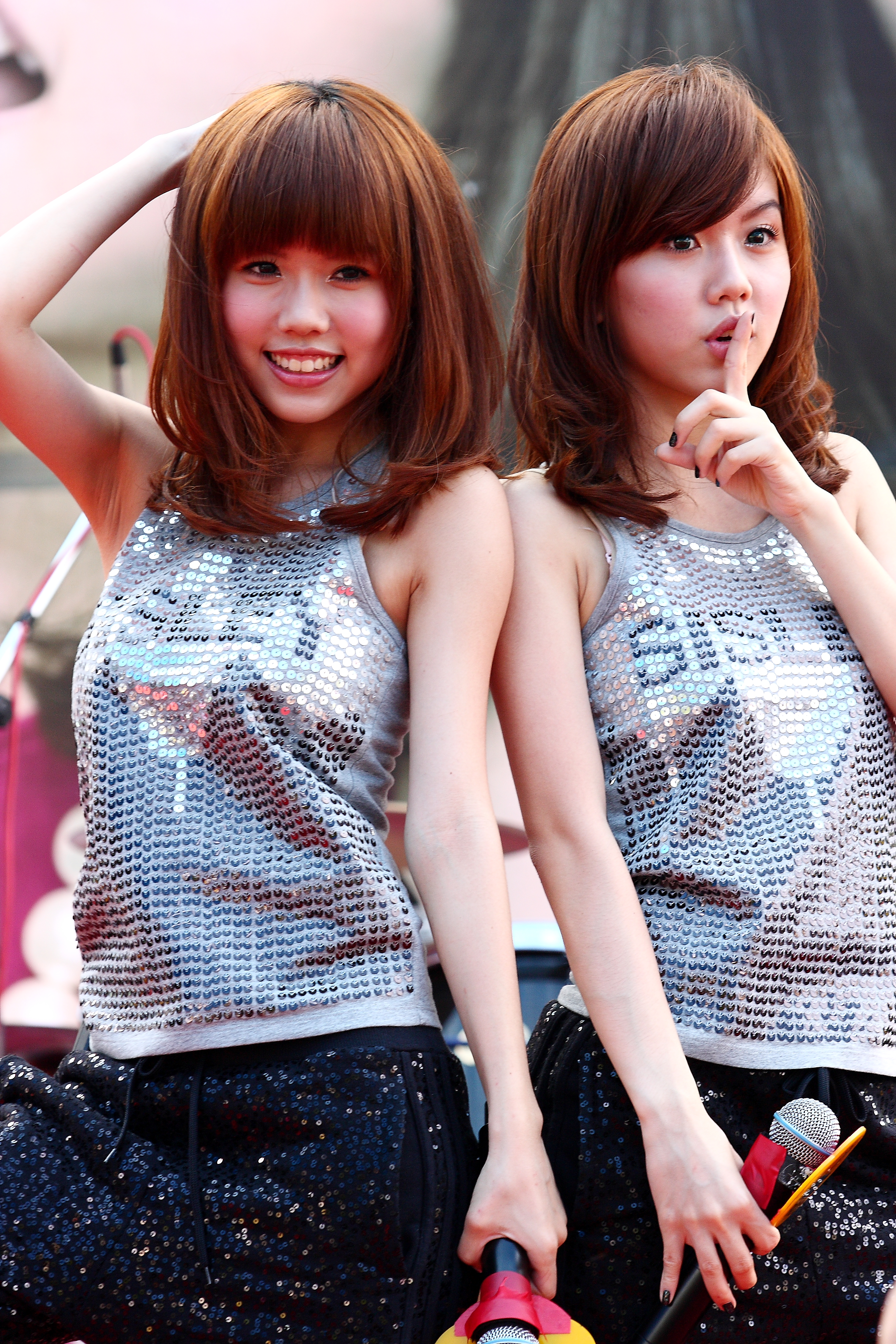
- By2 in 2009
- Studio albums: 6
- EPs: 1
- Compilation albums: 1
- Singles: 34
- Promotional singles: 4

The following is the discography for Singaporean girl group By2. They have released six studio albums, one extended play, and thirty-four singles to date.

== Studio albums ==
Title	Album details	Peak chart positions
Title	Album details	TWN
NC 16 (16未成年)	Released: 28 July 2008; Language: Mandarin; Label: Ocean Butterflies Music	5
Twins	Released: 10 April 2009; Language: Mandarin; Label: Ocean Butterflies Music	2
Grown Up (成人禮)	Released: 9 April 2010; Language: Mandarin, English; Label: Ocean Butterflies Music	1
90' Now (90' 鬧Now)	Released: 12 October 2011; Language: Mandarin, English; Label: Ocean Butterflies Music	9
Paradise (M.Y 遊樂園)	Released: 18 September 2013; Language: Mandarin, English; Label: Ocean Butterflies Music	6
Cat and Mouse	Released: 7 August 2015; Language: Mandarin, English; Label: Ocean Butterflies Music	—
Love and Love	Released: 3 March 2017; Language: Mandarin, English; Label: Ocean Butterflies Music	—

== Extended plays ==
Title	Album details
2020 Love You Love You (2020 爱你爱你)	Released: 3 August 2012; Language: Mandarin; Label: Ocean Butterflies Music

== Singles ==
Title	Year	Album
"Buy Buy Buy"	2008	NC 16
"Love Me ^O^ (Puppy Love Flavor)"	2008	NC 16
"Get Your Butt Off the Seat"	2008	NC 16
"Ai Ya Ai Ya"	2008	NC 16
"2 Young"	2008	NC 16
"Don't Go Away"	2009	Twins
"DNA"	2009	Twins
"Wo Zhidao"	2009	Twins
"Xin Shao Nu Qin Dao"	2009	Twins
"Wu Jie You"	2009	Twins
"Yong Gan"	2009	Twins
"Zhe Jiao Ai"	2010	Grown Up
"Daren De Shijie"	2010	Grown Up
"Aishang Ni"	2010	Grown Up
"Dai Wo Likai"	2010	Grown Up
"Shang Xin Nong Chang"	2010	Grown Up
"Cou Ra Neo"	2010	Grown Up
"You Mei You"	2011	90' Now
"Hong QuingTing"	2011	90' Now
"Yi Yang Ai Zhe Ni"	2011	90' Now
"Nao Nao Now"	2011	90' Now
"Kanbujian"	2011	90' Now
"Bu Shi Gu Yi"	2011	90' Now
"2020 Ai Ni Ai Ni"	2012	2020 Love You Love You
"Ni Bing Bu Ding Wo"	2012	2020 Love You Love You
"No Reason" (沒理由)	2013	Paradise
"No More Tears" (不哭了)	2013	Paradise
"The Fool" (傻呆呆)	2013	Paradise
"Is It Like This?" (就這樣嗎)	2013	Paradise
"Legend Of Daji" (雙面妲己)	2014	Paradise
"Back in the Days" (當時的我們)	2015	Cat and Mouse
"Cat and Mouse"	2015	Cat and Mouse
"Say You Love Me" (愛我就大聲說)	2015	Cat and Mouse
"Love Hurt" (溫柔最痛)	2015	Cat and Mouse
"Love Never Exist" (你沒愛過我)	2015	Cat and Mouse
"Peach Blossom" (桃花旗袍)	2017	Love and Love
"Love & Love" (愛又愛)	2017	Love and Love
"Mr. Dream"	2017	Love and Love
"Long Distance Lovers (異地戀人預告)"	2020	TBA
"Bad Girl (坏女孩)"	2021	TBA
"No Longer Afraid (不再懦弱)"	2021	TBA
"Please Listen (你还在听吗)"	2022	TBA
Non-album singles
"Don't Go Away" (English Version)	2009	Non-album single
"Every time I Look Into Your Eyes" (English Version)	2010	Non-album single
"Big Mouth" (烏鴉嘴)	2015	Non-album single
"The Policewoman Is Coming" (警花驾到)	2021	Non-album single

== Promotional singles ==
Title	Year	Album
"Love Me ^O^ (Sweet 16 Flavor)"	2008	NC 16
"Bye Bye Bye"	2009	Twins
"Ai De Shuangchong Mo Li"	2010	Grown Up
Stereo	2013	Paradise
