= Zhou Mi filmography =

- Film: 1
- Television series: 8
- Television show: 26
- Radio show: 3
- Hosting: 19
- Music videos: 10

Zhou Mi (Chinese name: 周覓, born April 19, 1986) is a Chinese singer, actor, songwriter, presenter, MC, and radio DJ based in South Korea and China. He is a member of the Boy band Super Junior's sub-unit Super Junior-M and SM Entertainment's project group SM the Ballad. Aside from group activities, he also participates in various television variety shows, radio shows, and dramas.

In 2011, Zhou Mi acted in a supporting role in the Chinese drama Melody of Youth, which become his debut in that industry.

In 2012, Zhou Mi was cast as the main role in the idol drama When Love Walked In alongside label-mate Victoria Song, and Calvin Chen of the group Fahrenheit.

In 2013, Zhou Mi was cast in the movie Rhythm of Rain (聽見下雨的聲音). He played as a big boy who has a bright personality and is very sincere. This movie directed by lyricist Vincent Fang.

From 2013–2015, Zhou Mi was a radio DJ on MBC's C-Radio Idol True Colour.

In 2014, Zhou Mi became an MC for season 4 of the SBS MTV's music program The Show with Park Ji-yeon (T-ara) and Hongbin (VIXX).

In 2015, Zhou Mi was cast in the drama Best Couple He played as Yan Xi Cheng, who comes from a poor background and through hard work becomes a top star. He finds himself emotionally involved with his first love, fake wife and admirer.

In 2025, Zhou Mi starred in The Monsoon of Love Passes By as Jifeng, a rich second generation man who came to the city to escape from marriage,

== Film ==
Title	Year	Role	Note	Ref
Rhythm of Rain (聽見下雨的聲音)	2013	Xiao Si (小四)	Cameo (first love female lead)	

== Television series ==
Title	Year	Role	Notes	Ref
Stage of Youth (青春舞台)	2009	Zhou Mi	Cameo	
Melody of Youth (青春旋律)	2011	Gao Da		
When Love Walked In (愛情闖進門)	2012	Li Shang Lin		
Entertainer (딴따라)	2016	Himself	Cameo (Ep.7): MC of The Show	
Best Lover (최고의 커플) (最佳情侣)	2016	Yan Xi Cheng		
The Monsoon of Love Passes By (爱的季风掠过)	2025	Jifeng		
The Mysterious Team (天枢之契约行者) (Note: This drama was filming in 2017.)	TBA	James		

== Hosting programs ==
Program	Year	Notes	Ref
Series
Korean Impressions (韓國印象)	2010	with Chen Lan	
Celebrity Tour Guides (韓國超級天團)	2011		
SJM for Yahoo Music (SJ-M x Yahoo 音樂特輯)	2011	with Henry Lau	
Strongest Group (最强天团)	2014	with Peng Yu and Victoria Song	
Super Junior M's Guest House	2014		
The Show (더 쇼)	2014–2016	Season 4: with Jiyeon and Hongbin Season 5: with Yerin	
Fashion King-Secret Box (中韩时尚王)	2015	with Linda, Seo In-Young, and Kim Jong Kook	
The Goddess Beauty Club (男神女神颜习社)	2016	with Patty Hou and Shana	
Non-series
China Southern Airlines Stewardess Pageant (南航空姐选秀2010)	2010		
CPOP-JPOP-KPOP Music Festival	2011	with Li Xia and Yang Guang	
H.E.C Best of Best in Nanjing	2014	with Zhang Shan	
Winter Festival	2014	with Jiyeon and Hyeri	
Summer KPOP Festival	2015	with Jiyeon and Hongbin	
Special One-Asia Seoul Mega Concert	2015	with Jiyeon and Hongbin	
Asia Culture Festival	2015	with Jiyeon	
Be The Idol (唱游天下)	2015		
Suwon K-POP Super Concert	2016	with Heechul, Momo & Chaeyoung	
Other events
Zhang Liyin's Debut Showcase	2008		
SuperStar SMTOWN	2015	with Zhang Yixing	
Kim Heechul & Kim Jungmo Showcase "Dear My Fan"	2016		

== Radio shows ==
Radio broadcasts
Program	Year	Radio Station	Role	Note	Ref
Idols' True Colors / C-Radio (偶像本色/우상본색)	2013–2015	MBC 900AM	Radio DJ	with Jia and Fei	
Super Junior Kiss Radio	2015	KBS Cool FM	Host Thursday's corner: "Language and the City"		
Horan's Power FM	2015	SBS Power FM	Host "Nihao China"		

== Variety shows ==
Program	Year	Role	Note	Ref
The Avenue of Stars (星光大道)	2011	Guest Judge		
Generation Show (年代秀)	2012, 2013	Contestant		
Men to the Left Women to the Right (男左女右)	2013	Panelists		
Immortal Song (不朽之名曲)	2014	Contestant		
Super Junior-M Guest House Final Audition	2014	Judge		
Super Junior-M Guest House	2014, 2015	Host		
Star Escape Room (星星的密室)	2014, 2015	Cast Member	Season 1-2	
Immortal Songs 2 (불후의 명곡 II - 전설을 노래하다)	2014, 2016	Contestant	2014 : with TRAX (Episodes 176-177) 2016 : with Heechul & Jungmo (Episode 263)	
Frozen Miracle (冰雪奇迹)	2016	Cast Member		
Zhou Mi: Attraction TV - Seoul Diary (셀럽스타일 랭킹)	2016	Host		
The Strongest Women Team (最強女團)	2016	Guest Judge		
That Sounds Delicious (听得到的美食)	2017	Guest Partner	Paired with Chef Dami	
Masked of Dancer (蒙面舞王)	2020	Contestant		
Let's Music Together (一起音乐吧)	2020	Contestant		
Masked of Singer (蒙面唱將) Season 5	2020–2021	Contestant	as "Big Daddy" (Episodes 7 & 9)	
King of Mask Singer (미스터리 음악쇼 복면가왕)	2023	Contestant	as "Fish Bowl" (Episode 412)	
You're My Guest (招待不周您客气)	2025	Host		
Hello Star Class (你好星课堂官微)	2026	Mentor		

== Music videos ==
Title	Year	Album	Language	Ref.
As lead artist
"Blind"	2014	SM the Ballad Vol. 2 – Breath	Chinese	
"Rewind" (featuring ZTAO)	2014	Rewind	Chinese	
"Rewind" (featuring Chanyeol)	2014	Rewind	Korean	
"What's Your Number"	2016	What's Your Number?	Korean	
"What's Your Number"	2016	What's Your Number?	Chinese	
"Empty Room"	2016	What's Your Number?	Chinese	
"I Don't Care"	2018	Non-album singles	Chinese	
"The Lonely Flame"	2018	Non-album singles	Chinese	
"Starry Night" (with. Ryeowook)	2020	Non-album singles	Chinese	
"Starry Night" (with. Ryeowook)	2020	Non-album singles	Korean	
"Mañana (Our Drama)" (featuring Eunhyuk)	2023	Non-album singles	Korean	
"Ex Games"	2024	Non-album singles	Korean	
Collaboration
"Santa U Are The One" (Super Junior with. Zhou Mi and Henry)	2011	2011 Winter SMTown – The Warmest Gift	English	
