= Zhou Mi discography =

Discography

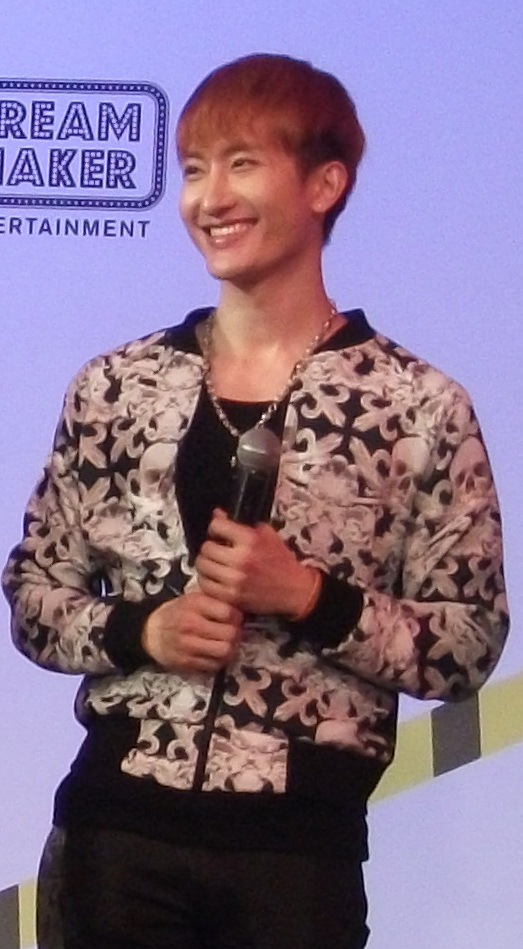
- Zhou Mi at SJM's Bangkok Fanmeeting
- EPs: 2
- Singles: 12
- Collaborations: 3
- Soundtrack appearances: 5
- Promotional singles: 7

Chinese singer and actor Zhou Mi has released two extended plays and ten singles. Debuting as a member of Super Junior-M in 2008, he branched out as a solo artist in 2014 with the release of his first EP Rewind. Besides write songs for his solo releases, he also write for his group and other artist.

== Extended plays ==
List of extended plays, with selected chart positions and sales
Title	Album details	Peak chart positions		Sales (DL)
Title	Album details	KOR	US World	Sales (DL)
Rewind	Released: October 31, 2014 (KOR); Label: SM Entertainment; Formats: CD, digital download; Track listing: 1. "Rewind" (featuring Chanyeol of EXO) (Korean Version) - 3:32; 2. "Why (Color-blind)" (Korean Version) - 3:33; 3. "Without You" - 3:39; 4. "Lovesick" (Chinese: 一人的寂寞 Yī Rén De Jì Mò) - 4:16; 5. "Loving You" (Chinese: 爱上你 Ài Shàng Nǐ) (featuring Victoria of f(x)) - 3:45; 6. "Love Tonight" (featuring Tao) - 3:30; 7. "Rewind" (featuring Tao of EXO) (Chinese Version) - 3:32; 8. "Why (Color-blind)" (Chinese Version) - 3:33; 9. "Lovesick" (Cantonese: 一人的寂寞 Jat Jan Di Zik Mok)(Cantonese version) - 4:15	5	12	KOR: 8,676
What's Your Number?	Released: July 19, 2016 (KOR); Label: SM Entertainment, Label SJ; Formats: CD, digital download; Track listing: 1. "What's Your Number?" (Korean Version) - 4:00; 2. "Empty Room" (이제는 없다) - 4:30; 3. "Half of Me" (半边脸) - 3:53; 4. "What's Your Number?" (Chinese Ver.) - 4:00; 5. "Empty Room" (空房间 Chinese Ver.) - 4:30	7	—	KOR: 3,524
"—" denotes items which were not released in that country or failed to chart.

== Singles ==
Title	Year	Peak chart positions			Sales	Album
Title	Year	KOR	US World	CHN Baidu Chart	Sales	Album
As lead artist
"Distance Embrace (距離的擁抱)"	2013	—	—	—	—N/a	Breakdown
"Blind (太贪心)"	2014	— (Note: "Blind" (Chinese version) did not enter the Gaon Digital Chart, but it peaked at number 55 on the Gaon International Digital Chart.)	—	—	—N/a	SM the Ballad Vol. 2 – Breath
"Rewind" (featuring Chanyeol)	2014	161	5	—	KOR: 19,371	Rewind
"Rewind" (featuring Z.Tao)	2014	—	—	17	—N/a	Rewind
"Loving You" (featuring Victoria Song)	2014	—	—	13	—N/a	Rewind
"Empty Room (空房间)"	2016	—	—	—	—N/a	What's Your Number?
"What's Your Number?"	2016	—	—	—	—N/a	What's Your Number?
"I Don't Care (我不管)"	2018	—	—	—	—N/a	Non-album singles
"The Lonely Flame (寂寞煙火)" (Note: "The Lonely Flame (Japanese ver.)" was released on April 23, 2019 in Japan as his first promotional single.)	2018	—	—	—	—N/a	Non-album singles
"Mañana (Our Drama)" (featuring Eunhyuk) (Note: Mañana (Our Drama)(Chinese ver.) was released on the same day. This song was also released as a Japanese version on July 24, 2023.)	2023	—	—	—	—N/a	Non-album singles
"Utopia" (featuring Hendery of WayV) (Note: Utopia (Chinese ver.) was released on the same day.)	2024	—	—	—	—N/a	Non-album singles
"Ex Games" (Note: Ex Games (Chinese ver.) was released on the same day.)	2024	—	—	—	—N/a	Non-album singles
"6570"	2026	—	—	—	—N/a	Non-album singles
Collaborations
"Santa U Are the One" (with Super Junior and Henry Lau)	2011	64	—	—	—N/a	2011 SMTown; Winter: The Warmest Gift
"I'll Be There (在你身旁)" (with Kun, Xiaojun)	2020	—	—	—	—N/a	Non-album singles
"Starry Night" (with. Ryeowook) (Note: Starry Night (Korean ver.) was released on the same day.)	2020	—	23	—	—N/a	Non-album singles
"And (그리고)" (with Shin Ye-young) (Note: This song was also released as a Chinese Version with the title "If (如果)".)	2024	—	—	—	—N/a	Casting in the Corner Project
"Please Don't Go (오늘은 가지마)" (with Zhang Liyin) (Note: This song was also released as a Chinese Version.)	2024	—	—	—	—N/a	Non-album singles
"Promise (约定)" (Super Junior-D&E with Siwon, Zhou Mi, Ryeowook, and Kyuhyun)	2024	—	—	—	—N/a	Non-album singles
"GBGN" (with Chanyeol)	2024	—	—	—	—N/a	Non-album singles
Soundtrack appearances
"Melody of Youth (青春旋律)"	2011	—	—	—	—N/a	Melody of Youth OST
"Dandelion (蒲公英)" (with. Ma Su, Yang Yang, Jiang Mengjie, Su Qing)	2011	—	—	—	—N/a	Melody of Youth OST
"Goodbye (不留紀念)"	2011	—	—	—	—N/a	Skip Beat! OST
"Best Lover (最佳情侣)" (with. Lee Da-hae)	2016	—	—	—	—N/a	Best Lover OST
"Perfect Love (完美愛情)"	2016	—	—	—	—N/a	Best Lover OST
"Puzzle (宣判)"	2023	—	—	—	—N/a	The Justice OST
"All Love"	2025	—	—	—	—N/a	The Monsoon of Love Passes By OST
"—" denotes releases that did not chart or were not released in that region.

== Appearances ==
Title	Year	Album	Ref.
Compilation appearances
"Today or Tomorrow (今天还是明天)"	2006	Challenge A Host (挑战主持人 80进40)	
"Everyday (天天)"	2008	SJ-M 100 Days Anniversary	
"Let's Go (放手)"	2009	OPPO Music Carnival Night	
"Finally Said It (終於說出口)"	2011	Exceptionally Unlike Another (非常不一班)	
"Remember (記)"	2011	100% Entertainment (娱乐百分百)	
"Wife (家後)"	2011	Big Brother (綜藝大哥大)	
"You Are A Song In My Heart (你是我心內的一首歌)" (with. Victoria Song)	2012	The Generation Show (年代秀)	
"Marry Me Today (今天妳要嫁给我)" (with. Victoria Song)	2012	The Generation Show (年代秀)	
"Love In Before Century (爱在西元前)" (with. Xiao Xin and Steelo Z. M.I.C. (MIC男团)	2013	The Generation Show (年代秀)	
"Freedom (自由)" (with. Calvin Chen)	2013	Happy Camp (快乐大本营)	
"Wild Lilies Also Have A Spring (野百合也有春天)"	2014	Immortal Song (不朽之名曲): Luo Dayou	
"Despite Your Smile (웃는 얼굴 다정해도)" (with. Trax)	2014	Immortal Songs: Singing the Legend (불후의 명곡: 전설을 노래하다): Lee Bong Jo	
"In A Dilemma (左右为难)" (with William So)	2014	Metro EPS IDO Concert	
"My Ear's Candy (내귀에 캔디)" (with. Jiyeon & Hongbin)	2015	Summer K - POP Festival	
"I Believe" (with. Alan)	2015	Be The Idol (唱遊天下)	
"Love Expert (戀愛達人)" (with. Fei)	2016	Happy Camp (快乐大本营)	
"Pro And Amateur (프로와 아마추어)" (with. Kim Heechul & Kim Jungmo)	2016	Immortal Songs: Singing the Legend (불후의 명곡: 전설을 노래하다) : Roo'ra	
"Exclusive Memory (独家记忆)"	2020	Global Chinese Music Chart (全球中文音乐榜上榜]歌曲)	
"Deep (無底洞)"	2020	Masked of Singer (蒙面唱將) Season 5	
"Full Name (連名帶姓)"	2021	Masked of Singer (蒙面唱將) Season 5	
"Don’t Forget (잊지 말기로해)"	2023	King of Mask Singer (미스터리 음악쇼 복면가왕)	
"Nights Into Days (혼자서 걸어요)"	2023	King of Mask Singer (미스터리 음악쇼 복면가왕)	
"Long Time No See (好久不见)"	2024	Let's Play Music Together (一起音乐吧]歌曲)	
"Courage (勇气)"	2024	Music Road Trip (位看音乐之旅)	
Other appearances
"Love Is Simple (愛, 很簡單)" (with. Ryeowook and Kyuhyun)	2008	SJM Show Hong Kong Concert	
"Just Want You To Be Happy (只要你快樂)"	2009	SJM Fan Party in Taiwan	
"Courage (勇气)"	2009	SJM Fan Meeting in Shanghai	
"Another Heaven (另一个天堂)" (with. Luna)	2010	SM Town Live '10 World Tour	
"I Will Always Love You"	2010	Super Show 3	
"Miss Chic (瀟灑小姐)"	2011	Super Show 3	
"3 O'clock In The Morning (凌晨三點鐘)"	2011	Hari Belia Concert at Malaysia Youth Day	
"The Sky Is Dark (天黑黑)"	2011	SJM Fan Party in Taiwan	
"When You (當你)"	2011	SJM Fan Meeting in Beijing	
"Love Doesn't Travel Alone (愛不單行)" (with. Ryeowook featuring Eunhyuk)	2012	Tainan Music Festival	
"Because of You"	2013	Super Show 4	
"The Summer Day That The Wind Blew Past (被风吹过的夏天)" (with. Victoria Song)	2013	SM Town Live World Tour III	
"Song Of Life (いのちの歌)" (with. Sungmin, Ryeowook, and Kyuhyun)	2014	Super Show 5	
"How Am I Supposed To Live Without You" (with. Sungmin, Ryeowook, and Kyuhyun)	2015	Super Show 5	
"My All Is In You (吹一樣的風)" (with. Sungmin, Ryeowook, and Kyuhyun)	2015	Super Show 5	

== Production discography ==
=== Writer-producer ===
- November 2024: "GBGN" by Zhou Mi with Chanyeol (Note: Credited with 米奇林 MCKY (ROMAD and 杜大发))
- April 2026: "6570"
- July 2026: "FADE" by Sehun (Note: Credited with David Du (杜大发))

=== Songwriting and composing credits ===
All credits below are sourced from Korea Music Copyright Association (search ID '10007155') and Music Copyright Society of China (search '周觅').

Indicates single release

Song	Year	Album	Artist	Lyrics		Music		Ref
Song	Year	Album	Artist	Credited	With	Credited	With	Ref
"Love Song (爱你爱你)"	2008	Me	Super Junior-M	Yes	—N/a	No	—	
"Marry U" (remake of Marry U Korean Vers.)"	2008	Me	Super Junior-M	Yes	—N/a	No	—	
"A Man In Love (渴望)" (remake of "A Man In Love (갈증)")	2008	Me	Super Junior-M	Yes	—N/a	No	—	
"Confession (告白)"	2009	Super Girl	Super Junior-M	Yes	—N/a	No	—	
"You and Me (愛情接力)"	2009	Super Girl	Super Junior-M	Yes	—N/a	No	—	
"Breaka Shaka / Love, Frequency (爱, 频率)"	2010	Breaka Shaka	Kangta	Yes	—N/a	No	—	–
"Remember (记得)"	2010	Breaka Shaka	Kangta	Yes	—N/a	No	—	–
"Many Times"	2010	Breaka Shaka	Kangta	Yes	—N/a	No	—	–
"True Love"	2011	Perfection	Super Junior-M	Yes	—N/a	No	—	
"Go"	2013	Break Down	Super Junior-M	Yes	—N/a	No	—	
"It's You"	2013	Break Down	Super Junior-M	Yes	Tina Wang	No	—	
"Tunnel"	2013	Break Down	Super Junior-M	Yes	—	No	—	
"Swing (嘶吼)"	2014	Swing	Super Junior-M	Yes	—	No	—	
"Fly High (飞翔)"	2014	Swing	Super Junior-M	Yes	—	No	—	
"Run (奔跑)"	2014	Overdose	Exo-M	Yes	—	No	—	–
"Addiction"	2014	Non-album single	Tasty	Yes	—	No	—	–
"Without You"	2014	Rewind	Zhou Mi	Yes	—	No	—	
"Lovesick (一人的寂寞)"	2014	Rewind	Zhou Mi	Yes	—	Yes	—	
"Loving You" (爱上你) (featuring Victoria Song)	2014	Rewind	Zhou Mi	Yes	—	No	—	
"Love Tonight" (featuring TAO)	2014	Rewind	Zhou Mi	Yes	Huang Zitao	No	—	
"Rewind" (Chinese Ver.) (featuring TAO)	2014	Rewind	Zhou Mi	Yes	Zhou Weijie	No	—	
"Why (Color-blind)" (Chinese Ver.)	2014	Rewind	Zhou Mi	Yes	—	No	—	
"Forever with You"	2015	Devil	Super Junior-M	Yes	—	No	—	
"What's Your Number" (Chinese Ver.)	2016	What's Your Number?	Zhou Mi	Yes	—	No	—	
"Empty Room (空房间)" (Chinese Ver.)	2016	What's Your Number?	Zhou Mi	Yes	—	No	—	
"The Lonely Flame (寂寞煙火)"	2018	Non-album single	Zhou Mi	Yes	—	Yes	Soh Jin, Chung Seung-hyun	
"I'll Be There (在你身旁)" (with. Kun, Xiaojun)"	2020	Non-album single	Zhou Mi	Yes	—	Yes	—	
"Starry Night" (with. Ryeowook)	2020	Non-album single	Zhou Mi	Yes	—	Yes	—	
"Mañana (Our Drama)"(Chinese Ver.) (featuring Eunhyuk)	2023	Non-album single	Zhou Mi	Yes	—	No	—	
"Promise (约定)" (with Siwon, Zhou Mi, Ryeowook. and Kyuhyun)	2024	Non-album single	Super Junior-D&E	Yes	Donghae	No	—	
"Utopia" (Chinese Ver.) (featuring Hendery of WayV)	2024	Non-album single	Zhou Mi	Yes	Ji Yewon and Ellie Suh	No	—	
"GBGN" (with Chanyeol)	2024	Non-album single	Zhou Mi	Yes	CoolZ / 李李	Yes	CoolZ	
"6570"	2026	Non-album single	Zhou Mi	Yes	—	Yes	CQ,Z	
