= By2 =

Singaporean pop duo

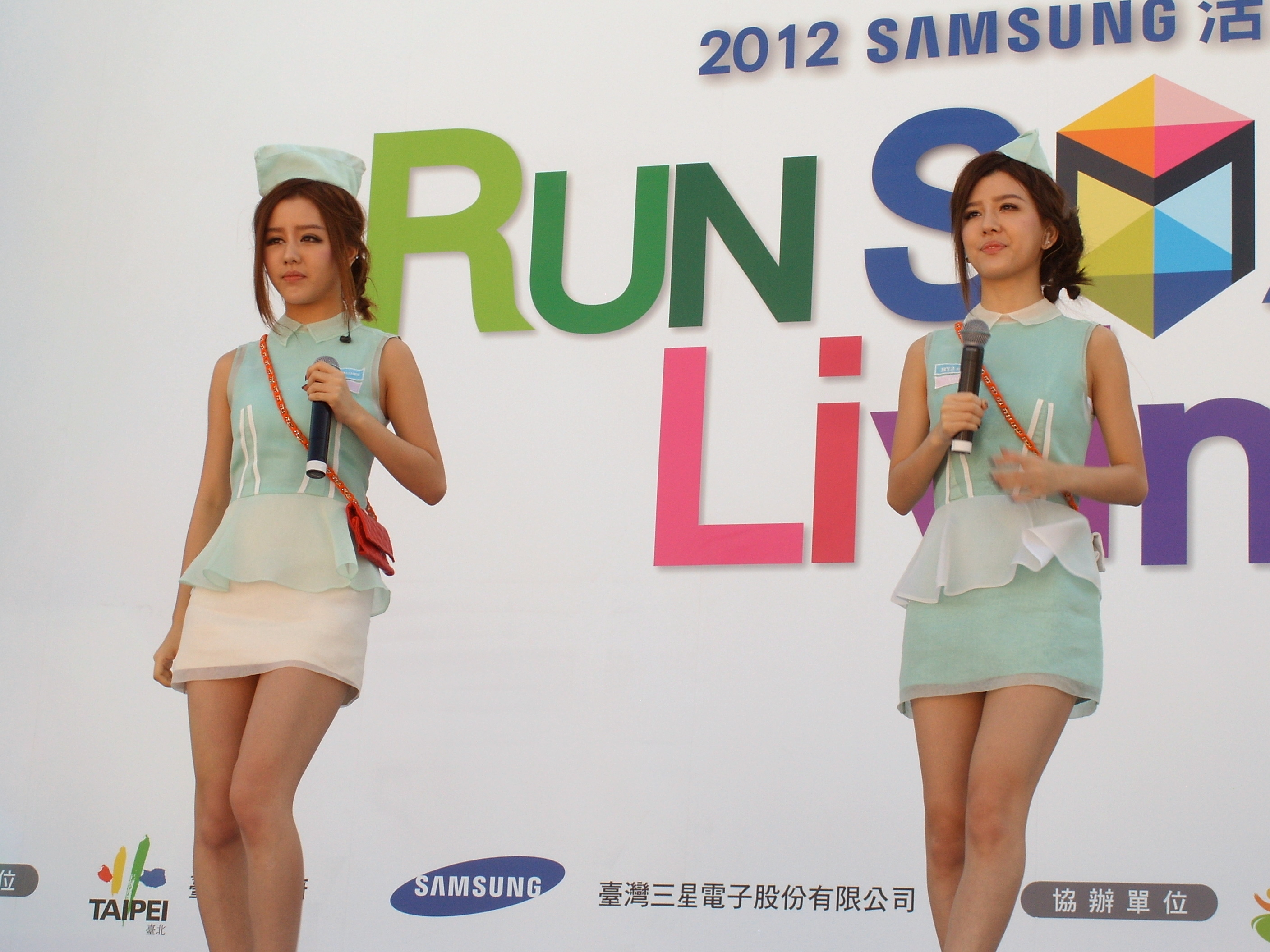
- By2 at the Taipei Samsung Running Festival in 2012

Background information
- Born: 23 March 1992 (age 34)
- Origin: Singapore
- Genres: Mandopop; dance-pop
- Years active: 2008–present
- Labels: Ocean Butterflies Music (2008–2019); By2 Studio (2019–present)
- Members: Miko Bai (孫涵); Yumi Bai (孫雨)
- Website: Official Blog

By2 is a Singaporean duo composed of twin sisters Miko Bai and Yumi Bai. They gained attention with their first two studio albums, NC 16 and Twins, but it was not until 2010 when they released their third studio album, Grown Up, for which gained them significant popularity. The album was responsible for 33 percent sales of albums in the Chinese market and 18 percent sales of albums in Taiwan during the week of 9 to 15 April 2010.

== Name ==
Their duo band was named "BY2" after their surname Bai and that they are twin sisters.

== Career ==
=== Pre-debut ===
From a young age, both sisters were exposed to performing arts and learned the violin, piano, ballet and many other styles of dancing. As they reached adolescence, their passion for performing grew and they picked up more performing skills. They joined the Chinese Folk Dance in their secondary school, Yio Chu Kang Secondary School, as part of their co-curricular activity. The sisters have been given different hairstyles for easy identification due to their uncanny resemblance. They claimed to have different personalities. Miko (Bai Wei-Fen) has been described as more introverted and quiet while her sister, Yumi (Bai Wei-Ling) has been described as a more extroverted and outgoing person. They moved to Taiwan in 2007 to further their career.

At the age of 13, both of them joined the Ocean Butterflies' Music Forest's V Singer ("非常歌手") training course. The course aims to teach aspiring singers how to perform on stage and techniques in singing and dancing. Their father died of cancer in 2007 when Miko and Yumi were 15 years old. Their father had hoped that Miko and Yumi would not give up on their dreams under any circumstances, thus encouraging them to actively pursue their aspiration of becoming singers. They graduated from the course clinching a "Best Costume Design" award. Billy Koh of Ocean Butterflies Music noticed their talent and gave them a 10-year record deal. They were sent to other regions such as Japan, China and Taiwan to gain exposure to different forms of dance styles and to receive further vocal training and stage presence.

=== Debut and breakthrough (2008–present) ===
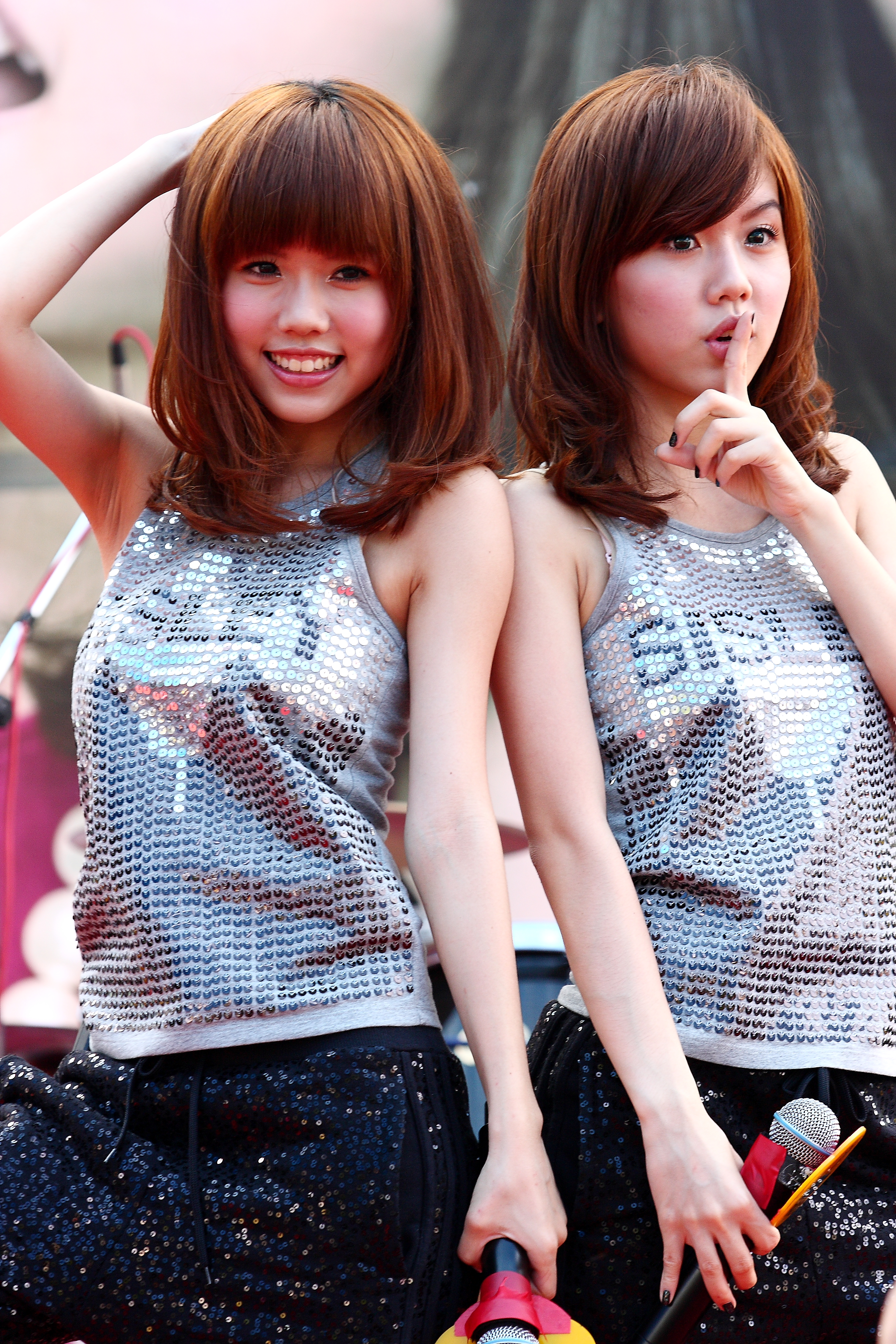
By2 at Tainan South Park, 2009

By2 released their debut studio album, NC 16, on 25 July 2008. consisting of 11 songs in total, with composers under their label composing the songs for the album. On 10 April 2009, the duo released their second studio album, Twins, with a total of 11 songs. This is the first album featuring a track written by the duo, titled "Don't Go Away", which was used as the opening theme for the Taiwanese airing of the Korean television series East of Eden. The song was also released in an English version. By2 released their third studio album, Grown Up, on 9 April 2010. The album was a commercial success, topping several album charts in mainland China and taking first place on Taiwan's G Music Chart. During the week of 9 to 15 April, the album was responsible for 33 percent of sales in the Mandarin language album market. The duo also went into writing, publishing their first book "Love Always" in 2011 with an Asia-wide release. The first edition was sold out in Taiwan within a week after the release date. The duo released their fourth studio album, 90' Now, on 19 October 2011. After completing these activities, the duo went on a musical hiatus that spanned for a year.

By2 released their first extended play, 2020 Love You Love You, on 3 August 2012. It had a total of 4 tracks including the 2 promotional tracks, "2020 Love You Love You" and "You Don't Know Me". "When Love Walked In" from the extended play was featured as the opening theme of Chinese-Taiwanese drama of the same name which stars Victoria Song, Calvin Chen and Zhou Mi. In September 2012, the duo represented Singapore in the Chinese reality singing talent show, Asian Wave. The duo released their fifth studio album, Paradise, on 18 September 2013. It peaked at number 6 on Taiwan's G-Music chart during the week of release from 14 to 20 September. They held various meet and greet sessions around Taiwan and China and also performed on various Taiwanese variety shows to promote the album and its two promotional singles, "No Reason" and "No More Tears".

By2 released their sixth studio album, Cat and Mouse, on 28 July 2015. The duo appeared on various TV shows in China to promote the album. The twins also made numerous stops all around China to perform songs from their album. On 26 November 2015, not too long after an album release, By2 released a new single for the Chinese-drama Miss Unlucky, on the Ocean Butterflies Music's official YouTube Channel, titled "Big Mouth". This single became the opening credits song for the drama. In January 2019, By2 revealed that they and Ocean Butterflies had parted ways.

In 2025, the twins were detained at a Beijing airport upon entry to China when officials mistakenly believed them to be the same individual, entering the country twice.

== Members ==
English name	Chinese name		Date of birth
English name	Romanized	Hanzi	Date of birth
Miko Peh Wei-fen (白偉芬)	Sun Han	孫涵	23 March 1992 (Older sister)
Yumi Peh Wei-ling (白偉玲)	Sun Yu	孫雨	23 March 1992 (Younger sister)

== Discography ==
Studio album

- NC 16 (2008)
- Twins (2009)
- Grown Up (2010)
- 90' Now (2011)
- Paradise (2013)
- Cat and Mouse (2015)
- Love and Love (2017)

Extended plays

- 2020 Love You Love You (2012)
