= Beautiful Secret =

- Drama poster
- Genre: Romance comedy; Musical
- Written by: Ru Ping
- Directed by: Ke Hanchen
- Starring: Victoria Song; Peter Ho; Zhang Xianzi; Shawn Wei
- Country of origin: China
- Original language: Mandarin
- No. of episodes: 37

Production
- Running time: 45 minutes
- Production companies: Shanghai Grand Media; Haoju Drama Co.Ltd; Shanghai Shimao Media Co., Ltd

Original release
- Network: Hunan TV
- Release: 21 December 2015 – 12 January 2016

Beautiful Secret (Chinese: 美丽的秘密) is a 2015–2016 Chinese television series starring Victoria Song and Peter Ho. It aired on Hunan TV from 21 December 2015 to 12 January 2016. The drama achieved the highest average viewership ratings for the first half of 2016 in China.

== Synopsis ==
The love story between music producer Guan Yi and aspiring singer Jiang Meili, who hides a shocking birth secret.

== Cast ==
- Victoria Song as Jiang Meili
- Peter Ho as Guan Yi
- Zhang Xianzi as Xu Roulin
- Shawn Wei as Cheng Weifeng
- Li Ying as Wang Xuan
- Ivy Shao as Jiang Meiyan
- Ji Ning as Zhang Quan
- Zhao Rui as Sun Jinsheng
- Huang Li as Jiang Weiguo
- Xiong Xiaowen as Chen Jingzhu
- Novia Lin as Sha Sha
- Li Zi as Song Yiqiang
- Xu He as CEO Li

== Soundtrack ==
Beautiful Secret - Original Television Soundtrack (美丽的秘密电视剧原声音乐大碟)
| No. | Title | Music | Length |
|---|---|---|---|
| 1. | "Star's Tears (星星泪)" (Opening theme song) | Victoria Song |
| 2. | "A Love That is Realised Eventually (后知后觉的爱)" (Ending theme song) | Peter Ho |
| 3. | "The Distance of a Single Step (差一步距离)" | Zhang Xianzi |
| 4. | "Dear Child (亲爱的小孩)" | Victoria Song & Jin Tiantian |
| 5. | "Do Not Bear to Leave (还舍不得别离)" | Zhang Xianzi & Meng Tingwei |
| 6. | "2501" | Zhang Xianzi |
| 7. | "Unfulfilled Lovers (幸福未满的恋人)" | Zhang Xianzi |
| 8. | "I Decided to Like Someone (我决定喜欢我自己)" | Weng Hangrong |

== Ratings ==
- Highest ratings are marked in red, lowest ratings are marked in blue

Hunan TV Ratings of Premiere
| Air date | Episode | CSM50 city network ratings | | | National Internet ratings | | |
| Air date | Episode | Ratings (%) | Audience share (%) | Rank | Ratings (%) | Audience share (%) | Rank |
|---|---|---|---|---|---|---|---|
| 21 December 2015 | 1-2 | 1.023 | 2.803 | 4 | 2.25 | 6.65 | 1 |
| 22 December 2015 | 3-4 | 1.067 | 2.961 | 4 | 2.18 | 6.69 | 1 |
| 23 December 2015 | 5-6 | 1.311 | 3.624 | 3 | 2.48 | 7.31 | 1 |
| 24 December 2015 | 7-8 | 1.342 | 3.747 | 3 | 2.71 | 8.16 | 1 |
| 25 December 2015 | 9 | 0.723 | 1.96 | 7 | 1.93 | 5.08 | 1 |
| 26 December 2015 | 10 | 0.879 | 2.3 | 5 | 2.12 | 5.52 | 1 |
| 27 December 2015 | 11-12 | 1.328 | 3.44 | 3 | 2.66 | 7.73 | 1 |
| 28 December 2015 | 13-14 | 1.235 | 3.38 | 3 | 2.85 | 8.33 | 1 |
| 29 December 2015 | 15-16 | 1.316 | 3.59 | 3 | 2.77 | 8.05 | 1 |
| 30 December 2015 | 17-18 | 1.494 | 4.05 | 3 | 2.83 | 8.31 | 1 |
| 31 December 2016 | — | — | — | — | — | — | — |
| 1 January 2016 | — | — | — | — | — | — | — |
| 2 January 2016 | 19 | 0.866 | 2.26 | 5 | 2.12 | 5.53 | 2 |
| 3 January 2016 | 20-21 | 1.133 | 3.05 | 4 | 2.13 | 6.55 | 3 |
| 4 January 2016 | 22-23 | 1.366 | 3.64 | 3 | 2.73 | 7.95 | 1 |
| 5 January 2016 | 24-25 | 1.3 | 3.44 | 4 | 2.68 | 7.66 | 1 |
| 6 January 2016 | 26-27 | 1.4 | 3.74 | 3 | 2.71 | 7.78 | 1 |
| 7 January 2016 | 28-29 | 1.327 | 3.64 | 4 | 2.73 | 7.97 | 1 |
| 8 January 2016 | 30 | 0.937 | 2.46 | 5 | — | — | — |
| 9 January 2016 | 31 | 1.176 | 3 | 4 | 2.3 | 5.77 | 1 |
| 10 January 2016 | 32-33 | 1.446 | 3.97 | 3 | 2.88 | 8.74 | 1 |
| 11 January 2016 | 34-35 | 1.83 | 5.05 | 1 | 3.31 | 9.59 | 1 |
| 12 January 2016 | 36-37 | 2.084 | 5.83 | 1 | 3.98 | 11.52 | 1 |
