= Grown Up (album) =

Studio album by By2
- Released: April 9, 2010
- Recorded: 2010
- Genre: Mandopop
- Length: 38:02
- Label: Ocean Butterflies Music

By2 chronology
Twins (2009)	Grown Up (2010)	90' Now (2011)

Singles from Grown Up
- 1. "Zhe Jiao Ai" Released: March 5, 2010; 2. "Adult World" Released: March 30, 2010; 3. "In Love With You" Released: April 8, 2010; 4. "Dai Wo Likai" Released: May 1, 2010; 5. "Take Me Away" Released: June 3, 2010; 6. "Join In The Fun" Released: July 23, 2010

Grown Up (Chinese: 成人礼), is the third studio album by Singaporean duo, By2. It was released on April 9, 2010 and contains 11 songs.

== Background ==
The album, which was released one month after By2's 18th birthday, follows the concept of them growing up, having passed their 18th birthday. Rather than their "cutesy" concept in their previous album, the album has a more "mature" concept.

== Commercial performance ==
Following the release of the album, "Grown Up" was an immediate success, taking first place on Taiwan's music chart, "G-Music", and other various music charts in mainland China. The album was responsible for 18 percent of all album sales in Taiwan during the week of April 9 to April 15 and was also the highest selling album for the same week for all Mandarin language album sales, with about 33 percent sales.

== Track listing ==
No.	Title	Length
1.	"Take Me Away 帶我離開 (Dài wǒ líkāi)"	3:42
2.	"Adult World 大人的世界 (Dàrén de shìjiè)"	3:53
3.	"In Love With You 愛上你 (Ài shàng nǐ)"	4:28
4.	"Sad Farm 傷心農場 (Shāngxīn nóngchǎng)"	3:07
5.	"Join in the Fun 湊熱鬧 (Còurènào)"	4:00
6.	"Free to Love 任由愛 (Rèn yóu ài)"	3:29
7.	"Big Adventure 大冒險 (Dà màoxiǎn)"	3:36
8.	"Love's Double Magic 愛的雙重魔力 (Ài de shuāngchóng mólì)"	3:25
9.	"Strange Silly Cat 好奇傻死貓 (Hàoqí shǎ sǐ māo)"	3:22
10.	"This Is Called Love 這叫愛 (Zhè jiào ài)"	3:30
