= When Love Walked In =

- Promotional poster
- Also known as: The Prince Who Lost His Castle
- Genre: Romance comedy
- Directed by: Chen Zhi; Han Feng
- Starring: Victoria Song; Calvin Chen; Zhou Mi
- Opening theme: When Love Walked In by By2
- Ending theme: Pass By by Jeanie Zhang
- Countries of origin: China; Taiwan
- Original language: Mandarin
- No. of episodes: 32

Production
- Producer: Meng Xue
- Production locations: Shanghai, Hainan, Taipei
- Production company: Shanghai Film Co.

Original release
- Network: GTV
- Release: 27 August – 2 November 2012

When Love Walked In (Chinese: 爱情闯进门; pinyin: ài qíng chuǎng jìn mén) is a 2012 Chinese-Taiwanese co-produced television series starring Victoria Song of f(x), Calvin Chen of Fahrenheit and Zhou Mi of Super Junior-M. The series premiered on GTV on 27 August 2012.

Victoria Song won the Best New Actress award at the China TV Drama Awards.

== Synopsis ==
Young, talented, and handsome Qin Yujiang (Calvin Chen) receives orders to look for Chairman Yuan's long lost granddaughter, Shen Yayin (Victoria Song). As grandfather tried every means to separate her and her father, Ya Yin often moved houses and hid away from her grandfather since she was young. When her father died, Ya Yin dislikes her grandfather as she feels that he has ruined her childhood happiness and was part of the cause contributing to her father's death. Ya Yin's guardian plotted a plan for her own daughter, Yu Ru (Ya Yin's cousin) to impersonate as Ya Yin to dupe Chairman Yuan into thinking that she is actually his long-lost granddaughter. Yu Jiang gradually enters Ya Yin's heart but refuses to admit his love for her because she's Chairman Yuan's granddaughter. Ya Yin's evil cousin also became an obstacle between Ya Yin and Yu Jiang's love.

== Cast ==
- Victoria Song as Shen Yayin
  - Xu Yuhan as young Ya Yin
- Calvin Chen as Qin Yujiang
  - Bian Cheng as young Yu Jiang
- Zhou Mi as Li Shanglin
- Sean Lee as Gu Qingfeng
- Tong Xiaoyan as Chen Yuru
- Emily Cao as Xiao Fen

== Soundtrack ==
When Love Walked In - Original Television Soundtrack (爱情闯进门电视剧原声音乐大碟)
No.	Title	Music	Length
1.	"When Love Walks In (爱情闯进门)"	BY2
2.	"Pass By (经过)"	Jeanie Zhang
3.	"Broken (分裂)"	Dong Cheng Wei
4.	"The One You Want Is Not Me (你要的不是我)"	JJ Lin
5.	"Tears (泪了)"	Pets Tseng
6.	"An Elegant Breakup (优雅的分手)"	Rynn Lim

== Ratings ==
Anhui TV ratings
Air date	Episode #	Ratings (%)	Audience share (%)	Rank
2012.08.27	1-2	0.76	2	8
2012.08.28	3-4	0.81	2.12	8
2012.08.29	5-6	0.81	2.14	8
2012.08.30	7-8	0.74	1.94	8
2012.08.31	9-10	0.72	1.87	7
2012.09.01	11-12	0.83	2.12	7
2012.09.02	13-14	0.79	2.04	7
2012.09.03	15-16	0.91	2.46	1
2012.09.04	17-18	0.99	2.73	1
2012.09.05	19-20	0.94	2.55	3
2012.09.06	21-22	0.91	2.45	5
2012.09.07	23-24	0.98	2.63	4
2012.09.08	25-26	0.92	2.57	4
2012.09.09	27-28	0.83	2.16	7
2012.09.10	29-30	1	2.64	5
2012.09.11	31-32	1.1	2.84	4
