= Love and Love =

Studio album by By2
- Released: March 3, 2017
- Genre: Mandopop
- Label: Ocean Butterflies Music

By2 chronology
Cat and Mouse (2015)	Love and Love (2017)	TBD (2023)

Singles from Love and Love
- 1. "Peach Blossom Cheongsam (桃花旗袍)" Released: January 13, 2017; 2. "Love and Love (愛又愛)" Released: March 1, 2017; 3. "Mr.Dream (夢先生)" Released: April 13, 2017

Love and Love (Chinese: 愛又愛), is the eight studio by Singaporean duo By2. It was released on March 3, 2017 with a total of 13 tracks consisting of three singles and ten remixes. The album's first single "桃花旗袍" received a lot of attention throughout Greater China with many fans performing dance covers and uploading them on YouTube, Instagram, and Weibo.

== Background and release ==
Prior to the release of the album, the title track, Peach Blossom Cheongsam (桃花旗袍) was released first on January 13, 2017 and the music video for the song was also uploaded on Ocean Butterflies's official YouTube channel. Following the release of the album, the music video of their second promotional single, Love and Love (愛又愛), was released on March 3, 2017. At last, the third album MV Mr. Dream (夢先生) was released on April 13, 2017.

== Commercial performance ==
The album single Peach Blossom Cheongsam (桃花旗袍) peaked at number 5 on Billboard's China's V Chart during the week of March 4, 2017. The title track Love and Love (愛又愛) also peaked at number 5 during the week of March 18, 2017. By2 held a fan meeting in Taipei, Taiwan on the day of the album release in Ximending. By2 did appear on Taiwanese variety shows to perform the album during the first weeks of March 2017. The rest of their live performances and fan meetings have only been in Mainland China.

== Composition ==
The studio album contains 13 tracks, including the title track, Peach Blossom Cheongsom (桃花旗袍). The track has influences from Traditional Chinese culture but, also has modern influences to be a dance a track. Love and Love's 10 non-single tracks are all remixes of previous By2 songs.

== Track listing ==
No.	Title	Length
1.	"Ài yòu ài (愛又愛; Love and Love)"
2.	"Táohuā qípáo (桃花旗袍; Peach Blossom Cheongsam)"
3.	"Mèng xiānshēng (夢先生; Mr.Dream)"
4.	"Ài shàng nǐ (愛上你 (Remix Version)"
5.	"Wǒ zhīdào (我知道 (Remix Version)"
6.	"Zhè jiào ài (這叫愛 (Remix Version)"
7.	"DNA (Remix Version)"
8.	"Yīyàng àizhe nǐ (一樣愛著你 (Remix Version)"
9.	"Èr líng èr líng ài nǐ ài nǐ (2020愛你愛你 (Remix Version)"
10.	"PP bié nián zài yǐ shàng (PP別黏在椅上 (Remix Version)"
11.	"Mǎi mǎi mǎi (買買買 (Remix Version)"
12.	"Yǒu méi yǒu (有沒有 (Remix Version)"
13.	"Dài wǒ líkāi (帶我離開 (Remix Version)"
