= SM the Ballad =

Ballad group

- Genres: K-pop; R&B; Jazz
- Years active: 2010; 2014
- Label: SM Entertainment
- Members: Max Changmin; Yesung; Kyuhyun; Zhou Mi; Taeyeon; Chen
- Past members: Jay Kim; Jino; Zhang Liyin; Jonghyun; Krystal
- Website: smtheballad.smtown.com

SM the Ballad (stylized as S.M. THE BALLAD) is a South Korean ballad project group composed of singers from SM Entertainment. The group released its first extended play, Miss You, in 2010 and its second extended play, Breath, in 2014.

== History ==
=== 2010: Debut and Miss You ===
"Miss You", the lead single of the unit's first EP, was originally titled "When It Began" and was written as a duet song for Shinee. When Shinee members Onew and Jonghyun recorded the song, which included the rap vocals of member Minho, S.M. Entertainment intended to include the duet in Shinee's 2008 debut album, Replay. Due to incompatibility with their album's image, Shinee planned to release the song as a separate single. After a few more image changes, it was decided that the single would be performed by Xia Junsu, Super Junior's Kyuhyun, and Jonghyun. Two months prior to the EP's release, Junsu left S.M. Entertainment. The final plan was to include Jay Kim of the TRAX and new SM trainee, Jino, and the song title officially became "Miss You". With Jonghyun, Kyuhyun, Jay Kim, and Jino in the final line-up, S.M. the Ballad debuted their first performance of "Miss You" on SBS' Inkigayo on November 28, 2010. They released their album, Miss You, on November 29, 2010.

=== 2014: Lineup changes and Breath ===
"Breath" (Korean Version)
A sample of Taeyeon & Jonghyun - "Breath"

On February 3, 2014, S.M. Entertainment revealed, TVXQ's Max Changmin, Super Junior's Yesung, Zhang Liyin, Girls' Generation's Taeyeon, Super Junior-M's Zhou Mi, f(x)'s Krystal and Exo's Chen gathered to release a new EP together with original member Jonghyun. S.M. explained, "SM the Ballad is indeed planning to comeback [sic] very soon. We're going to reveal the details soon". It was later announced that the track list would contain songs in Korean, Japanese and Chinese.

On February 12, 2014, the members of SM the Ballad – with the exception of Changmin and Yesung – held a joint recital concert, performing the new songs from their album. Breath was released on February 13, 2014.

== Members ==
=== 2010 lineups ===
- Jay Kim (TRAX)
- Kyuhyun (Super Junior)
- Jonghyun (Shinee)
- Jino

=== 2014 lineups ===
- Changmin (TVXQ)
- Yesung (Super Junior)
- Zhang Liyin
- Taeyeon (Girls' Generation)
- Jonghyun (Shinee)
- Zhou Mi (Super Junior-M)
- Krystal (f(x))
- Chen (Exo)

== Discography ==
=== Extended plays ===
Title	Album details	Peak chart positions	Sales
Title	Album details	KOR	Sales
Miss You	Released: November 29, 2010; Label: SM Entertainment; Formats: CD, digital download; Track listing: 1. 너무 그리워 (Miss You); 2. Hot Times (시험하지 말기); 3. 다시... 사랑합니다 (Love Again); 4. Don't Lie (feat. Henry); 5. 내일은... (Another Day)	1	KOR: 23,162
Breath	Released: February 13, 2014; Label: SM Entertainment; Formats: CD, digital download	1 (Note: The Korean version of Breath peaked at number one on the Gaon Album Chart, while the Chinese version of the album peaked at number four.)	KOR: 63,222

=== Singles ===
Title	Year	Peak chart positions	Sales	Album
Title	Year	KOR	Sales	Album
"Miss You" (너무 그리워)	2010	16		Miss You
"Breath" (숨소리) (sung by Taeyeon and Jonghyun)	2014	3	KOR: 464,673	Breath
"A Day Without You" (하루) (sung by Jonghyun and Chen)	2014	8	KOR: 138,388	Breath
"Set Me Free" (sung by Taeyeon)	2014	18	KOR: 119,358	Breath

=== Other charted songs ===
Title	Year	Peak chart positions	Sales	Album
Title	Year	KOR	Sales	Album
"Hot Times" (시험하지 말기)	2010	93		Miss You
"Blind" (내 욕심이 많았다) (sung by Yesung)	2014	56		Breath
"When I Was... When U Were..." (좋았던 건, 아팠던 건) (sung by Krystal and Chen)	2014	31	KOR: 83,820	Breath
"Breath" (呼吸) (Chinese ver., sung by Chen and Zhang Liyin)	2014	68	KOR: 29,288	Breath
"Breath" (Japanese ver., sung by Max and Krystal)	2014	— (Note: "Breath" (Japanese version) did not enter the Gaon Digital Chart, but it peaked at number 16 on the Gaon International Digital Chart.)	KOR: 17,023	Breath
"Blind" (僕のせいだよ) (Japanese ver., sung by Yesung)	2014	— (Note: "Blind" (Japanese version) did not enter the Gaon Digital Chart, but it peaked at number 47 on the Gaon International Digital Chart.)		Breath
"Blind" (太貪心) (Chinese ver., sung by Zhou Mi)	2014	— (Note: "Blind" (Chinese version) did not enter the Gaon Digital Chart, but it peaked at number 55 on the Gaon International Digital Chart.)		Breath

== Other media ==
On January 4, 2011, SM Entertainment, together with NEOWIZ Internet Corporation, Ltd, released an iPhone application which features S.M. the Ballad's first mini-album Miss You. The app includes preview tracks of the album, an image gallery and clock, as well as the music videos for "Miss You" and "Hot Times".
