= Paradise (By2 album) =

Studio album by By2
- Released: (Taiwan) September 18, 2013
- Genre: Mandopop
- Length: 34:59
- Label: Ocean Butterflies Music

By2 chronology
2020 Love You Love You (2012)	Paradise (2013)	Cat and Mouse (2015)

Singles from Paradise
- 1. "No Reason (沒理由)" Released: September 5, 2013; 2. "No More Tears (不哭了)" Released: September 23, 2013; 3. "The Fool (傻呆呆)" Released: October 15, 2013; 4. "Is It Like This? (就這樣嗎)" Released: December 12, 2013; 5. "Legend Of Daji (雙面妲己)" Released: January 8, 2014

Angel Edition

Devil Edition

Paradise (Chinese: MY.遊樂園), is the fifth studio album by Singaporean duo, By2. It was released on September 18, 2013, with a total of 10 tracks with 4 promotional singles. The album achieved immediate success shortly after its release.

== Background and release ==
Prior to the release of the album, the title track, No Reason (沒理由) was released first on September 5, 2013 and the music video for the song was also uploaded on Ocean Butterflies's official YouTube channel. The album was released in 3 editions; the Regular edition, the Devil edition and the Angel edition, with the Devil and Angel editions being pre-order editions only. Following the release of the album, the music video of their second promotional single, No More Tears (不哭了), was released on September 18, 2013. The music videos for the other four promotional singles were also released on YouTube through the label's official channel.

By2 held various meet and greet sessions around Taiwan and China and also performed on various Taiwanese variety shows to promote the album.

== Commercial performance ==
The album peaked at number 6 on Taiwan's G-Music chart during the week from September 14 to 20.

== Composition ==
The studio album contains 10 tracks, including the title track, No Reason (沒理由). The title track which is a dance pop track that garners influences from America’s house-pop style, a genre of electronic dance music. With the lyrics by Lin Tsu Chin, the song also has an English version titled Stereo. The second promotional track, Didn't Cry (不哭了), is a ballad track with lyrics about the imperfection of a relationship.

== Track listing ==
No.	Title	Length
1.	"Méi Lǐyóu (沒理由; No Reason)"
2.	"Bù Kū Le (不哭了; No More Tears)"
3.	"Shǎ Dāi Dāi (傻呆呆; The Fool)"
4.	"Shuāngmiàn Dájǐ (雙面妲己; Legend of Daji)"
5.	"Jiù Zhèyàng Ma (就這樣嗎; Is It Like This?)"
6.	"Àiqíng Lái Zhǎochá (愛情來找碴; Love Trouble)"
7.	"Guīmì Lèyuán (閨蜜樂園; Gal's Playground)"
8.	"Mèngxiǎng Bùnéng Děngdài (夢想不能等待; Dreams Can't Wait)"
9.	"Cáng Bùzhù (藏不住; Can't Hide)"
10.	"Stereo"
