= Cat and Mouse (album) =

Studio album by By2
- Released: (Taiwan) July 28, 2015
- Genre: Mandopop
- Length: 35:34
- Label: Ocean Butterflies Music

By2 chronology
Paradise (2013)	Cat and Mouse (2015)	Love and Love (2017)

Singles from Cat and Mouse
- 1. "Cat and Mouse" Released: July 28, 2015; 2. "Back in the Days (當時的我們)" Released: July 12, 2015; 3. "Say You Love Me (愛我就大聲說)" Released: August 11, 2015; 4. "Love Hurt (溫柔最痛)" Released: August 17, 2015; 5. "Love Never Exist (你沒愛過我)" Released: August 24, 2015

Cat and Mouse Album Photos

Cat and Mouse is the sixth studio album by Singaporean duo, By2. The album was released on July 28, 2015, with a total of 9 tracks and 5 singles. The album achieved immediate success upon its release.

== Background and release ==
Before the album was released By2's record label, Ocean Butterflies International, uploaded the music video of the album's first single "Back in the Days" (當時的我們) on their YouTube Channel on July 12, 2015. On the date of the album's release, the MV for the song "Cat and Mouse" was released on YouTube. Music videos for three other promotional singles were also released later through the label's official channel.

== Commercial performance ==
By2's single (當時的我們) "Back in the Days" reached the top 3 on Taiwan's KKBox music chart on August 12, 2015. By2 won an award for most popular group at the Kugou Asian Music Awards.

== Track listing ==
No.	Title	Length
1.	"Cat and Mouse"	3:48
2.	"Dāngshí De Wǒmen (當時的我們; Back in the Days)"	4:21
3.	"Ài Wǒ Jiù Dà Shēng Shuō (愛我就大聲說; Say You Love Me)"	4:12
4.	"Wēnróu Zuì Tòng (溫柔最痛; Love Hurt)"	3:49
5.	"Nà Nián Xia Xuě De Shíhòu (那年下雪的時候; The Year When It Snowed)"	3:42
6.	"Nǐ Piàn Wǒ (你騙我; You Lied to Me)"	4:09
7.	"Chāo Yǒnggǎn (超勇敢; Unbeatable)"	3:37
8.	"Nǐ Méi Àiguò Wǒ (你沒愛過我; You Never Loved Me)"	4:07
9.	"Zěnyàng Shuō Qīng Cǐkè De Xīnqíng (怎樣說清此刻的心情; Can't Express In Words)"	3:49
Total length:		35:34
