= Twins (By2 album) =

Studio album by By2
- Released: April 10, 2009
- Genre: Mandopop
- Length: 36:40
- Label: Ocean Butterflies Music

By2 chronology
NC 16 (2008)	Twins (2009)	Grown Up (2010)

Singles from Twins
- 1. "Don't Go Away" Released: March 6, 2009; 2. "DNA" Released: April 12, 2009; 3. "I Know (Remark: LG KF350 advertisement theme song)" Released: May 9, 2009; 4. "Girl Praying" Released: June 23, 2009; 5. "No Explanation" Released: July 4, 2009; 6. "Bravery" Released: August 8, 2009

Twins is the second studio album by the Singaporean duo, By2. It was released under Ocean Butterflies Music.

== Track listing ==
No.	Title	Length
1.	"DNA"	3:33
2.	"I Want to 我想要 (Wǒ xiǎng yào)"	3:28
3.	"Girl Praying 新少女祈祷 (Xīn shàonǚ qídǎo)"	3:55
4.	"I Know 我知道 (Wǒ zhīdào)"	4:10
5.	"No Explanation 无解呦 (Wú jiě yōu)"	3:28
6.	"Invincible Commander 无敌帅 (Wúdí shuài)"	3:32
7.	"What What? 什么什么 (Shénme shénme)"	3:44
8.	"Bravery 勇敢 (Yǒnggǎn)"	4:08
9.	"Bye Bye Bye"	3:31
10.	"Flash 快闪 (Kuài shǎn)"	3:37
11.	"Don't Go Away"	4:34
