= 90' Now =

Studio album by By2
- Released: October 19, 2011
- Recorded: 2011
- Genre: Mandopop
- Length: 38:02
- Label: Ocean Butterflies Music

By2 chronology
Grown Up (2010)	90' Now (2011)	2020 Love You Love You (2012)

Singles from 90' Now
- 1. "Isn't It (有沒有)" Released: May 3, 2011; 2. "I Am Still Loving You (一樣愛著你)" Released: June 14, 2011; 3. "Unintentional (不是故意)" Released: July 23, 2011; 4. "Unseen (看不見)" Released: August 26, 2011; 5. "Now Now Now (鬧鬧NOW)" Released: September 30, 2011; 6. "Red Dragonfly (紅蜻蜓 )" Released: October 16, 2011

90' Now (Chinese: 90'鬧Now), is the fourth studio album by Singaporean duo By2. It was released on October 19, 2011, with a total of 10 tracks and 6 promotional singles.

== Composition ==
The album has a total of 10 tracks, with 6 promotional singles. The title track of the album, Isn't It (有沒有), is a dance-pop, upbeat track.

== Track listing ==
No.	Title	Length
1.	"Yǒu Méiyǒu (有沒有)"
2.	"Bùshì Gùyì (不是故意)"
3.	"Yīyàng Àizhe Nǐ (一樣愛著你)"
4.	"Bái Tù Er Guāiguāi (白兔兒乖乖)"
5.	"Yǒu Nǐ Wǒ Bùpà (有你我不怕)"
6.	"Kànbùjiàn (看不見)"
7.	"Zǎo'ān Nánhái (早安男孩)"
8.	"Wǒ Bùxiǎng KNOW (我不想KNOW)"
9.	"Hóng Qīngtíng (紅蜻蜓)"
10.	"Nào Nào NOW (鬧鬧NOW)"
