= 2020 Love You Love You =

EP by By2
- Released: (Taiwan) August 3, 2012
- Recorded: 2012
- Genre: Mandopop, electropop, dance-pop
- Length: 13:11
- Label: Ocean Butterflies Music

By2 chronology
90' Now (2011)	2020 Love You Love You (2012)	Paradise (2013)

Singles from 2020 Love You Love You
- 1. "2020 Love You Love You" Released: July 17, 2012; 2. "You Don't Know Me" Released: July 27, 2012

2020 Love You Love You (Chinese: 2020愛你愛妳), is the first EP by Singaporean duo, By2. It was released on August 3, 2012, consisting of 4 new songs with two promotional singles.

== Background ==
Before the actual release date of the EP, a limited edition of the album was released first on July 3, 2012. On August 3, 2012, the album was released physically in two versions, a Miko and Yumi version. Both of the versions comes with a large photo albums. On August 10, 2012, By2 held a showcase in Beijing to promote the album.

== Composition ==
The EP features a total of 4 tracks with the title track of the same name as the EP written and composed by By2 themselves. The EP opens with 2020 Love You Love You (2020愛你愛妳), a bubblegum dance track, about having fun in the summer. The second track, You Don't Know Me (你並不懂我), is a ballad track, the lyrics of the song are about realisation at a man who does not know them despite being with them. The third track, Touching the Heart Touches Love (觸動心 觸動愛), is a fast-paced, bubblegum pop track and the last track, Love Broke In (愛情闖進門), is a track with saccharine-like melody and piano interlude. Both the third and fourth track are about having a crush on a boy and leave little impression.

== Track listing ==
※ Bold track title means it is the title track in the album.

No.	Title	Lyrics	Music	Length
1.	"2020 Love You Love You" (2020愛你愛妳)	By2, Zhang Yan-ning, Dr.Moon	By2	3:19
2.	"You Don't Know Me" (你並不懂我)	Mr Mars，Yang Yan-yan, Peng Xiao-ming	Pan Qin-jia	3:58
3.	"Touching the Heart Touching the Love" (觸動心 觸動愛)	Wang Shuai	Liu Yong-hui	3:22
4.	"When Love Walks In" (愛情闖進門)	Liu Yong-hui	Liu Yong-hui	3:29
Total length:				13:11
