= NC 16 (By2) =

Studio album by By2
- Released: (Taiwan) July 25, 2008
- Genre: Mandopop
- Length: 39:59
- Label: Ocean Butterflies Music

By2 chronology
NC 16 (2008)	Twins (2008)

Singles from NC 16
- 1. "Puppy Love Flavor" Released: April 22, 2008; 2. "2Young" Released: July 10, 2008; 3. "PP Get Off The Seat" Released: July 25, 2008; 4. "Buy Buy Buy" Released: October 19, 2008; 5. "2Far" Released: October 25, 2008; 6. "2Much" Released: November 22, 2008

NC 16 (Chinese: 16 未成年), is the first studio album by Singaporean duo By2. It was released on July 25, 2008, with a total of 11 tracks with 6 promotional singles.

== Commercial performance ==
Following the release of the album, the album peaked at number 6 on Taiwan's G-Music chart during the week from July 14 to 25.

== Composition ==
All the songs of the album was written by their label and By2.

== Track listing ==
No.	Title	Length
1.	"Puppy Love Flavor (好好愛^0^)"
2.	"2Young (不夠成熟)"
3.	"PP Get Off The Seat (PP別黏在椅上)"
4.	"Dazed (發呆)"
5.	"Buy Buy Buy (買買買)"
6.	"2Far (愛丫愛丫)"
7.	"You Say, I Say (你說我說)"
8.	"Grass Jelly(仙草蜜)"
9.	"2Much (太難搞)"
10.	"Sweet Donut (甜甜圈)"
11.	"Sweet 16 Flavor (好好愛^0^)"
