= Melody of Youth =

- Also known as: 青春旋律 qīng chūn xuán lǜ
- Genre: Drama
- Directed by: Sang Hua (桑華)
- Starring: Leo Ku; Yang Yang; Jiang Mengjie; Kim Hee Chul; Zhou Mi
- Opening theme: "Ma Yi 《蚂蚁》 (Ants)" by Leo Ku
- Ending theme: "Pu Gong Ying《蒲公英》(Dandelion)" by Zhou Mi, Ma Su, Yang Yang, Jiang Mengjie, Su Qing
- Country of origin: Republic of China (China)
- Original language: Mandarin
- No. of episodes: 10

Production
- Producer: Li Yu (李語)
- Production location: China

Original release
- Network: CCTV1
- Release: 8 February 2011

Melody of Youth (Chinese: 青春旋律; pinyin: qīng chūn xuán lǜ) is a Chinese drama starring Leo Ku, Yang Yang, Jiang Mengjie, Kim Hee Chul of Super Junior and Zhou Mi of Super Junior-M.

It was produced by Li Yu (Chinese: 李語) and directed by Sang Hua (Chinese: 桑華).

== Synopsis ==
On the verge of graduation, college senior Wang Yuhang (Leo Ku) has to face the harsh reality of an extremely competitive job market. Struggling to rise above the crowd to win their places in the workforce, Yuhang and his roommate Liao Bohan (Deep Ng) throw themselves at every opportunity that may get their careers going. Pu Xiaotang (Jiang Mengjie) a headstrong tomboy who earns her own livings and is a pro at video games, Ning Hao (Yang Yang), Dong Qianqian (Ma Su), the group of young friends will have to grit their teeth and brave any challenges ahead in order to pursue their dreams.

Shen Tai Yi (Heechul) is a gamer/chess player who everyone thinks is a poor Korean farmer boy when he's actually the son of a wealthy landlord. Gao Da (Zhou Mi) is a character from a wealthy family, and after graduating high school, starts his own company after overcoming a lot of problems. He also decided to enlist in the army.

== Cast ==
- Leo Ku as Wang Yu Hang (汪雨航)
- Jiang Mengjie as Pu Xiao Tang (濮曉唐)
- Yang Yang (楊洋) as Ning Hao (宁浩)
- Michelle Wai (詩雅) as Tian Hui (田惠)
- Kim Hee-chul as Shen Tai Yi (申泰一)
- Zhou Mi as Gao Da (高達)
- Deep Ng (吳浩康) as Liao Bohan (廖伯晗)
- Eva Huang as Tian Tian (甜甜)
- Ma Su (馬蘇) as Dong Qianqian (董芊芊)
