= SM the Ballad Vol. 2 – Breath =

- Korean version cover

EP by SM the Ballad
- Released: February 13, 2014
- Recorded: 2013–2014
- Studios: SM Big Shot (Seoul); SM Blue Cup (Seoul); SM Blue Ocean (Seoul); SM Yellow Tail (Seoul); Sound Pool (Seoul); T (Seoul)
- Genres: K-pop; ballad; R&B
- Languages: Korean; Mandarin; Japanese
- Labels: SM; KT
- Producer: Lee Soo-man

SM the Ballad chronology
Miss You – S.M. The Ballad Vol.1 (2010)	SM the Ballad Vol. 2 – Breath (2014)

Singles from SM the Ballad Vol. 2 – Breath
- 1. "Breath" Released: February 10, 2014; 2. "A Day Without You" Released: February 11, 2014; 3. "Set Me Free" Released: February 12, 2014; 4. "Blind" Released: February 19, 2014

SM the Ballad Vol. 2 – Breath is the second extended play by the South Korean project group SM the Ballad. It was released on February 13, 2014, with the song "Breath" as the lead single.

== Background ==
Two of the tracks are written in three different languages and have three versions, with the languages being Korean, Chinese, and Japanese. "Breath" is the first and most heavily promoted song of the two, the Korean version is sung by Taeyeon and Jonghyun; the Chinese version by Chen and Zhang Liyin, while the Japanese version is sung by Max Changmin and Krystal. The other less promoted song is "Blind", with both the Korean and Japanese versions sung by Yesung, and recorded prior to his military enlistment. The Chinese version of "Blind" is sung by Zhou Mi.

Taeyeon and Jonghyun's duet "Breath" (Korean version) was the first track to be released on 10 February, with Jonghyun and Chen's duet "A Day Without You" being released on the 11th, and Taeyeon's solo "Set Me Free" being released on the 12th. A Mandarin version of "Set Me Free" sung by Zhang Liyin was released exclusively online on Baidu Music on the 13th. The full EP was released on February 13, 2014.

== Promotions ==
Taeyeon and Jonghyun performed "Breath" for the first time on M Countdown on 13 February. Chen and Zhang Liyin also performed the Chinese version of "Breath" on the live broadcast of Chinese Hunan TV's The Lantern Festival the day after. The song was also promoted on the shows KBS's Music Bank, Music Core and Inkigayo in February.

== Track listing ==
=== Korean version ===
CD
No.	Title	Lyrics	Music	Arrangement	Length
1.	"Dear…"		Kim Tae-seong; Kim Yong-shin		1:01
2.	"Breath" (숨소리; sung by Taeyeon and Jonghyun)	Kim Tae-seong; Jang Yeon-jeong; Choi Hyun-joon (V.O.S)	Kim Tae-seong; Choi Hyun-joon (V.O.S)	Kim Tae-seong; Kim Yong-shin	4:37
3.	"Blind" (내 욕심이 많았다; sung by Yesung)	Hwang Seung-chan; Jo Eun-hee	Choi Hee-jun; Hwang Seung-chan	Shin Jeong-eun	3:56
4.	"Set Me Free" (sung by Taeyeon)	Jo Kyu-man	Jo Kyu-man	Jo Kyu-man	4:21
5.	"A Day Without You" (하루; sung by Jonghyun and Chen)	Park Chang-hyun	Daniel Per Falt; Lasse Lindorff; Kim Enk Zorde; Shogo; Taka	Daniel Per Falt; Lasse Lindorff; Kim Enk Zorde; Shogo; Taka	3:36
6.	"When I Was… When U Were…" (좋았던 건, 아팠던 건; sung by Chen and Krystal)	Jo Kyu-man	Jo Kyu-man	Jo Kyu-man; Park Won-joon	3:54
Total length:					21:25

=== Chinese version ===
CD
No.	Title	Lyrics	Music	Arrangement	Length
1.	"Dear…" (亲爱的…)		Kim Tae-seong; Kim Yong-shin		1:01
2.	"Breath" (呼吸; sung by Chen and Zhang Liyin)	Wang Yinkai	Kim Tae-seong; Choi Hyun-joon (V.O.S)	Kim Tae-seong; Kim Yong-shin	4:37
3.	"Blind" (太贪心; sung by Zhou Mi)	Lin Xinye	Choi Hee-jun; Hwang Seung-chan	Shin Jeong-eun	3:56
4.	"Set Me Free" (放过我 (Korean version); sung by Taeyeon)	Jo Kyu-man	Jo Kyu-man	Jo Kyu-man	4:21
5.	"A Day Without You" (一天 (Korean version); sung by Jonghyun and Chen)	Park Chang-hyun	Daniel Per Falt; Lasse Lindorff; Kim Enk Zorde; Shogo; Taka	Daniel Per Falt; Lasse Lindorff; Kim Enk Zorde; Shogo; Taka	3:36
6.	"When I Was… When U Were…" (回想 (Korean version); sung by Chen and Krystal)	Jo Kyu-man	Jo Kyu-man	Jo Kyu-man; Park Won-joon	3:54
Total length:					21:25

Bonus track
No.	Title	Lyrics	Music	Arrangement	Length
1.	"Set Me Free" (放过我 (Chinese version); sung by Zhang Liyin)	Zhou Weijie	Jo Kyu-man	Jo Kyu-man	4:21
Total length:					25:46

=== Complete version ===
Digital download, streaming
No.	Title	Lyrics	Music	Arrangement	Length
1.	"Dear…"		Kim Tae-seong; Kim Yong-shin		1:01
2.	"Breath" (숨소리; sung by Taeyeon and Jonghyun)	Kim Tae-seong; Jang Yeon-jeong; Choi Hyun-joon (V.O.S)	Kim Tae-seong; Choi Hyun-joon (V.O.S)	Kim Tae-seong; Kim Yong-shin	4:37
3.	"Blind" (내 욕심이 많았다; sung by Yesung)	Hwang Seung-chan; Jo Eun-hee	Choi Hee-jun; Hwang Seung-chan	Shin Jeong-eun	3:56
4.	"Set Me Free" (sung by Taeyeon)	Jo Kyu-man	Jo Kyu-man	Jo Kyu-man	4:21
5.	"A Day Without You" (하루; sung by Jonghyun and Chen)	Park Chang-hyun	Daniel Per Falt; Lasse Lindorff; Kim Enk Zorde; Shogo; Taka	Daniel Per Falt; Lasse Lindorff; Kim Enk Zorde; Shogo; Taka	3:36
6.	"When I Was… When U Were…" (좋았던 건, 아팠던 건; sung by Chen and Krystal)	Jo Kyu-man	Jo Kyu-man	Jo Kyu-man; Park Won-joon	3:54
7.	"Breath" (Japanese version; sung by Max and Krystal)	Junji Ishiwatari	Kim Tae-seong; Choi Hyun-joon (V.O.S)	Kim Tae-seong; Kim Yong-shin	4:37
8.	"Blind" (僕のせいだよ (Japanese version); sung by Yesung)	Natsuko Hamasaki	Choi Hee-jun; Hwang Seung-chan	Shin Jeong-eun	3:56
9.	"Breath" (呼吸; sung by Chen and Zhang Liyin)	Wang Yinkai	Kim Tae-seong; Choi Hyun-joon (V.O.S)	Kim Tae-seong; Kim Yong-shin	4:37
10.	"Blind" (太贪心; sung by Zhou Mi)	Lin Xinye	Choi Hee-jun; Hwang Seung-chan	Shin Jeong-eun	3:56
Total length:					38:31

== Charts ==
=== Single chart ===
Title	Peak positions	
Title	KOR	
Title	Gaon	Hot
"Breath" (숨소리)	3	6
"Blind" (내 욕심이 많았다)	56	—
"Set Me Free"	18	—
"A Day Without You" (하루)	8	—
"When I Was… When U Were…" (좋았던 건, 아팠던 건)	31	—

=== Album chart ===
Chart	Peak position
Gaon Weekly albums chart	1
Gaon Monthly albums chart	5
Gaon Yearly albums chart	

=== Sales and certifications ===
Chart (2014)	Amount
Gaon physical album sales (Korean Version)	41,506
Gaon physical album sales (Chinese Version)	21,716
Gaon digital download sales for "Breath" (Korean Version)	464,673
Gaon digital download sales for "Breath" (Chinese Version)	19,290

== Credits and personnel ==
- Max Changmin – vocals
- Yesung – vocals
- Zhang Liyin – vocals
- Taeyeon – vocals
- Zhou Mi – vocals
- Jonghyun – vocals
- Krystal – vocals
- Chen – vocals
