= Rewind (EP) =

EP by Zhou Mi
- Released: October 31, 2014
- Recorded: 2014
- Studios: Doobdoob (Seoul); Hub (Seoul); Iconic (Seoul); In Grid (Seoul); SM Blue Ocean (Seoul); Sound Pool (Seoul); T (Seoul)
- Genres: Dance; R&B
- Length: 33:31
- Languages: Korean; Mandarin; Cantonese
- Labels: SM; KT Music
- Producers: Lee Soo-man; Kangta

Zhou Mi chronology
Rewind (2014)	What's Your Number? (2016)

Singles from Rewind
- 1. "Rewind" Released: October 31, 2014

Rewind is the debut EP by Chinese artist and Super Junior-M member Zhou Mi. It was released online on October 31, 2014, by SM Entertainment and distributed by KT Music, with a physical release on November 3, 2014.

== Background and release ==
The mini album was officially released online on October 31, 2014, along with the music videos of "Rewind".

== Composition ==
All Chinese songs were written by Zhou Mi. The Korean version of "Rewind" was written by Lee Yoo-jin and Oh Min-joo, while the Chinese version was written by Zhou Mi, Zhou Weijie, and Huang Zitao (Tao, ZTAO). The Korean version features a rap verse by Chanyeol of EXO-K, while the Chinese version features a rap verse by Tao of EXO-M. "Loving You" is a duet with Victoria of f(x).

== Music video ==
The music video of the song features fellow label mates Chanyeol for the Korean version and Tao for the Chinese version. The video depicts Zhou Mi remembering moments with a previous girlfriend. Towards the end of the video, the girlfriend is shown destroying his room in a fit of anger, after reading what seem to be his diary.

== Track listing ==
Credits adapted from the official homepage.

※ Bolded tracks indicate singles from the album.

CD/Digital download
No.	Title	Lyrics	Music	Arrangement	Length
1.	"**Rewind**" (featuring Chanyeol of EXO) (Korean Version)	Lee Yoo-jin; Oh Min-joo (Jam Factory)	Daniel "Obi" Klein; Jakob Mihoubi; Rudi Daouk	Daniel "Obi" Klein; Jakob Mihoubi; Rudi Daouk	03:32
2.	"Why (Color-blind)" (Korean Version)	Jeon Kan-di	Hayley Aitken; Olof Lindskog; Caesar & Loui	Yoo Han-jin	03:33
3.	"Without You"	Zhou Mi	Steven Lee	Im Kwang-uk; Im Chae-seop	03:39
4.	"Lovesick" (Chinese: 一人的寂寞 Yī Rén De Jì Mò)	Zhou Mi	Zhou Mi	Song Kwang-sik	04:16
5.	"Loving You" (Chinese: 爱上你 Ài Shàng Nǐ) (featuring Victoria of f(x))	Zhou Mi	Jo Yong-hoon; Lee Jae-myung	Jo Yong-hoon; Lee Jae-myung	03:45
6.	"Love Tonight" (featuring Tao)	Zhou Mi, Huang Zitao	Hwang Hyun	Hwang Hyun	03:30
7.	"**Rewind**" (featuring Tao of EXO) (Chinese Version)	Zhou Mi; Zhou Weijie, Huang Zitao	Daniel "Obi" Klein; Jakob Mihoubi; Rudi Daouk	Daniel "Obi" Klein; Jakob Mihoubi; Rudi Daouk	03:32
8.	"Why (Color-blind)" (Chinese Version)	Zhou Mi	Hayley Aitken; Olof Lindskog; Caesar & Loui	Yoo Han-jin	03:33
Total length:					33:31

Hong Kong version
No.	Title	Lyrics	Music	Arrangement	Length
9.	"Lovesick" (Cantonese: 一人的寂寞 Jat Jan Di Zik Mok)(Cantonese version)	Vicky Fung	Zhou Mi	Song Kwang-sik	4:15

== Chart performance ==
=== Album ===
Country	Chart	Peak position
South Korea	Gaon Weekly Albums Chart	5
South Korea	Gaon Monthly Albums Chart	12
United States	Billboard World Albums	12

=== Singles ===
Song	Peak chart position		
Song	KOR Gaon Chart	US Billboard World	CHN Baidu Chart
"Rewind" (feat. Chanyeol)	161	5	—
"Loving You" (feat. Victoria Song)	—	—	13
"Rewind" (feat. ZTAO)	—	—	17

== Sales ==
Chart	Amount
Gaon physical sales	8,676+

== Release history ==
Release history for Rewind
Region	Date	Format	Label	Ref
Various	October 31, 2014	Digital download; streaming	SM	
South Korea	November 3, 2014	CD	SM; KT	
Taiwan	November 28, 2014	CD	Avex Taiwan	
