= What's Your Number? (EP) =

EP by Zhou Mi
- Released: July 19, 2016
- Recorded: 2016
- Studio: Doobdoob (Seoul); In Grid (Seoul); Seoul
- Genre: K-pop; Dance; Ballad
- Length: 20:13
- Language: Korean; Chinese
- Label: Label SJ; SM; KT Music
- Producer: Tak Young-jun

Zhou Mi chronology
Rewind (2014)	What's Your Number? (2016)

Singles from What's Your Number?
- 1. "Empty Room (Chinese Ver.)" Released: July 14, 2016; 2. "What's Your Number?" Released: July 19, 2016

Music video
- "Empty Room (Chinese Ver.)" on YouTube "What's Your Number?" on YouTube

What's Your Number? is the second extended play by Chinese singer Zhou Mi, released by Label SJ, SM Entertainment and distributed KT Music on July 19, 2016.

== Background and release ==
On July 12, SM Entertainment released teaser video for track Empty Room (Chinese Ver.). On July 14, The music video for Empty Room (Chinese Ver.) was released. In the same day, Zhou Mi was announced to be releasing his second extended play title What's Your Number? on July 19.

However, both music videos received a high rate of dislikes due to Zhou Mi's political involvement.

== Promotion ==
Zhou Mi began performing "What's Your Number?" on South Korean music television programs on July 19, 2016.

== Track listing ==
No.	Title	Lyrics	Music	Arrangement	Length
1.	"What's Your Number?"	Kenzie	Christian Fast; Didrik Thott; Henrik Nordenback	Christian Fast; Didrik Thott; Henrik Nordenback	4:00
2.	"Empty Room" (이제는 없다; ijeneun eobsda; lit. There is no more)	Kim Se-yeon	Kim Se-yeon	Kang Hwa-seong	4:30
3.	"Half of Me" (半边脸)	Xiao Heng Jia; Zhou Wei Jie	Xiao Heng Jia	Kim Seung-yeol; Groovie. K	3:53
4.	"What's Your Number?" (Chinese Ver.)	Zhou Mi	Christian Fast; Didrik Thott; Henrik Nordenback	Christian Fast; Didrik Thott; Henrik Nordenback	4:00
5.	"Empty Room" (空房间 Chinese Ver.)	Zhou Mi	Kim Se-yeon	Kang Hwa-seong	4:30
Total length:					20:13

== Charts ==
Chart performance for Rewind
Chart (2016)	Peak position
South Korean Albums (Gaon)	7

== Release history ==
Region	Date	Format	Label	Ref.
South Korea	July 19, 2016	CD	SM; Label SJ; KT Music	
Various	July 19, 2016	Digital download; streaming	SM; Label SJ	
