= Zhou Mi =

Chinese singer (born 1986)

- 周觅
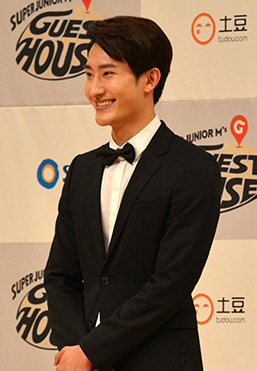
- Zhou Mi at press conference of Super Junior-M Guest House
- Born: April 19, 1986 (age 40); Wuhan, Hubei, China
- Education: Beijing Normal University - Broadcasting
- Occupations: Singer; songwriter; presenter; actor; entertainer; radio personality; author
- Musical career
- Genres: K-pop; Mandopop; R&B; Dance; Ballad
- Instrument: Vocals
- Years active: 2008–present
- Labels: SM; Label SJ; Zhou Mi Studio (Note: In 2016, Zhou Mi established a personal agency for his activities in China.); Baymon
- Member of: Super Junior-M; SM Town; SM The Ballad
- Website: Official website

Chinese name
- Traditional Chinese: 周覓
- Simplified Chinese: 周觅
Transcriptions
Standard Mandarin
- Hanyu Pinyin: Zhōu Mì
- Bopomofo: ㄓㄡㄇㄧ
- Wade–Giles: Chou Mi
- Tongyong Pinyin: Jhōu Mì
Yue: Cantonese
- Yale Romanization: Jāu Mik
- Jyutping: Zau1 Mik6

Korean name
- Hangul: 조미
Transcriptions
- Revised Romanization: Jo Mi
- McCune–Reischauer: Cho Mi

Signature
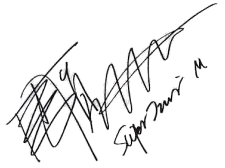

Zhou Mi (born April 19, 1986) is a Chinese singer active in South Korea and China signed under SM and co-managed with Baymon for his China-based activities. He debuted in 2008 as an exclusive member of the Super Junior's Chinese sub-group Super Junior-M, and later participated in SM Entertainment's project group SM the Ballad. Aside from group activities, he also participates in various television variety shows, radio shows, and dramas. He released his first solo EP entitled Rewind in 2014. In 2016, SM established its own management group for his activities in China, Zhoumi Studio (周觅工作室).

== Early life ==
Zhou Mi was born in Wuhan, Hubei province, China on April 19, 1986, the only child of his family. He has been interested in music since childhood.

Zhou Mi studied Broadcasting at Beijing Normal University at Xicheng District as well as a campus in Zhuhai Guangdong.

== Career ==
=== 2002–2007: Pre-debut ===
In 2002, at age 16, Zhou Mi attended and won his first large-scale singing competition, MTV's Second Annual National Newcomer Singing Competition. After winning the national championship, he was approached for a record deal but turned it down to continue his studies. This happened multiple times up until 2006.

In 2003, Zhou Mi won the title of Lively Star in the Wenquxing Star Ambassador Selection Competition. The contest earned him both a guest spot on Hunan TV's Happy Camp variety show and a spokesperson role for Wenquxing, an electronic dictionary maker.

At the Seventh Annual Shanghai Asian Music Festival Newcomer Singing Competition in 2004, Zhou Mi earned first place in the coastal region, as well as the National Newcomer Award.

Zhou Mi continued to participate in multiple singing competitions in 2005, even after moving from Beijing to Zhuhai, in southern Guangdong Province, for his studies. In 2005, he won four national championships and one regional championship, as well as a popularity contest at his university. He also was invited to sing at a Wang Leehom fanmeeting.

Zhou Mi made a name for himself in the Chinese entertainment scene by participating in competitions. In 2006, Zhou Mi joined CCTV's Challenging the Host, a televised national competition for aspiring MCs from all over China. As a representative of Guangzhou, Zhou Mi and 79 other contestants attended an offscreen training camp, learning about broadcasting from professionals and CCTV mentors. Zhou Mi proceeded to the next round easily during the 80 to 40 challenge (Guangzhou vs. Haarbin, aired May 25, 2006), and again during the 40 to 16 challenge aired July 30, 2006. Before the final 16 could compete, Zhou Mi received an offer from SM Entertainment and decided to put his studies on hold in order to go to Korea in late 2006. In 2007, Zhou Mi won the grand prize at the SM UCC Star Audition, although he didn't audition live. The auditions were conducted online from March 27 to early July 2007. His Korean friend, Kim Ki Hoon, signed him up to audition through the "Recommend a Friend" category, where he uploaded a video of Zhou Mi singing. he performed a song from South Korean Band Toy (토이) with the titled 내가 너의 곁에 잠시 살았다는걸 (That I was Once by Your Side), and then he signed a contract with SM Entertainment and began his trainee career.

Zhou Mi was appeared as MC the showcase of Zhang Liyin, and a few months later, he debuted in China as a member of Super Junior-M.

=== 2008–2009: Career beginnings ===
Zhou Mi debuted as the main vocalist of Super Junior-M in 2008. They debuted in China at the 8th Annual Music Chart Awards, simultaneously with the release of their first music video, "U" on April 8, 2008. Their first studio album, Me, was released on April 23, 2008. Their album debuted in Korea's MIAK Monthly Charts as #10 and reached #1 in China's Top in Music chart. For this album he wrote three songs: "Love Song", "A Man in Love", and "Marry U".

Super Junior-M's first mini-album, Super Girl, was released on September 23, 2009. For this album he wrote two songs entitled "Confession" and "You and Me". The mini-album won many awards and even earned the group a nomination for "Best Vocal Group" at the 21st Golden Melody Awards, the Chinese equivalent of the Grammy Awards.

=== 2010–2012: Hosting, comeback with Super Junior-M, and acting debut ===
In 2010, alongside his group activities, Zhou Mi also hosted a Chinese show entitled Korean Impression. This is a mainland travel-based show that focuses on Korea's latest news and cultural history. Each episode covers several cultural topics unique to Korea, including things like recent fashion trends, Kpop idols, cuisine, and cultural attractions. Zhou Mi wrote three songs for Kangta's Chinese EP Breaka Shaka in 2010 - the lead single "Breaka Shaka", "Remember", and "Many Times".

In February 2011, Zhou Mi played a supporting role in the Chinese drama Melody of Youth, which became his debut in that industry. He was also featured in the OST on the ending theme song "Youth Melody", and, along with other cast members, "Dandelion". Super Junior-M's second EP Perfection was released on February 23, 2011. For this album he wrote the song "True Love". The album was one of the best-selling albums of 2011 in Taiwan. He joined Super Junior-M with Henry Lau for the single "Santa U Are The One" taken from SMTown's eighth winter album, 2011 Winter SMTown – The Warmest Gift, which was released in December 2011. Zhou Mi participated in the OST for Siwon and Donghae's Taiwanese drama series Skip Beat! on the track "Goodbye (不留紀念)". This song was released on December 11, 2011.

In 2012, Zhou Mi was cast as the main role in the idol drama When Love Walked In alongside label-mate Victoria Song, and Calvin Chen of the group Fahrenheit. The drama premiered on August 27 on Anhui, Hubei, Shaanxi and Sichuan Satellite TV, and reached the number one spot in viewership ratings.

=== 2013–2014: Comeback group, SM The Ballad, and solo debut with Rewind ===
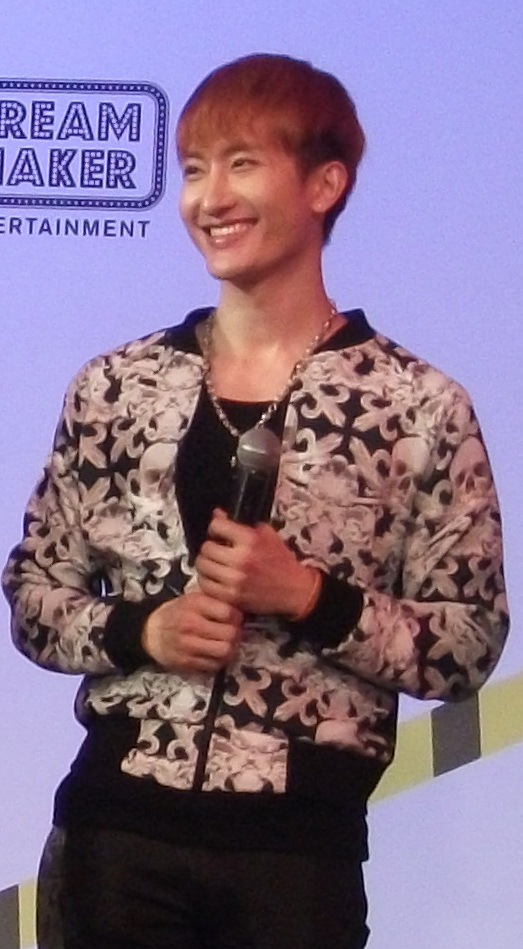
Zhou Mi at press conference of Super Junior-M Breakdown in Bangkok.

Super Junior-M's second studio album, Break Down, was released on January 7, 2013, along with a single by the same name. The album includes three songs written by Zhou Mi - "Go", "It's You" and "Tunnel". The music for these songs were composed by fellow Super Junior-M member Henry Lau and his team Noize Bank. Their Korean-language version of "Break Down" was released on January 31. On the same day, they made their official debut in Korea on Mnet's M Countdown. Malaysian singer and composer Michael Wong contributed to this album by composing a song for Zhou Mi, called "Distant Embrace", with lyrics by Hong Kong singer and actress Crystal Cheung. The lyrics of "Distant Embrace" are about the faint pain of a love. On April 7, 2013, Zhou Mi released a travel scrapbook entitled Thai Perfect which documented his travel experience in Thailand. Two versions of the book were released on December 5, 2013, one written in traditional Chinese, the other in simplified Chinese. In April 2013, Zhou Mi was cast in the movie Rhythm of Rain (聽見下雨的聲音). He played a big boy who has a bright personality who is very sincere. This movie was directed by lyricist Vincent Fang and was released on October 4, 2013. Later in 2013, Zhou Mi was chosen to be a radio DJ on MBC's C-Radio Idol True Colour with Miss A members Jia and Fei. The program on the new media platform showcases content produced by the network and targets the large number of 'hallyu' or 'Korean wave' fans in China. The network produced one episode each week, and the show was released to Chinese viewers on a Chinese video site such as Youku and Tudou, without going through a Chinese broadcasting station.

In February 2014, Zhou Mi became a new member of the ballad group SM The Ballad, initially formed in 2010. Zhou Mi participated in the group's second album, Breath, performing the Chinese version of "Blind". Zhou Mi performed his song at the S.M. The Ballad Joint Recital on February 12. He also performed this song on Arirang's music program Simply K-Pop, MBC M's music program Show Champion, and SBS MTV's music program The Show. In February 2014 Zhou Mi also appeared on music competition program Immortal Song (不朽之名曲), he performed Wild Lilies Also Have A Spring (野百合也有春天) by Michelle Pan. In March 2014, Super Junior-M's third mini album, Swing, was released. The EP consists of six songs, which were released for digital download on March 21, 2014, in China and Taiwan by S.M. Entertainment. In this album, Zhou Mi contributed lyrics to their lead single, "Swing", and another song entitled "Fly High". The group released the album on Korean music sites, such as MelOn, genie, Naver music and more, on March 31, 2014, and promoted it on Korean music programs. In July 2014, Zhou Mi was chosen to host the Korean-Chinese Variety Show titled Strongest Group with his labelmate Victoria Song. Zhou Mi then wrote the Chinese version of the track "Run" for another SM group, EXO's, second EP Overdose. In August 2014, Zhou Mi served as one of the main cast members and stood out as the universal interpreter or translator and a key facilitator on Super Junior-M’s Guest House. This is a Chinese-Korean reality/variety travel program produced by SBS in collaboration with Youku Tudou. It featured Super Junior-M members acting as tour guides and hosts, offering fans a special “guesthouse” experience with hidden spots, food, and cultural activities in Korea. He also hosted the “Auditions with Zhou Mi” segments where fans competed for the chance to join the show. These were humorous and highlighted his charming, witty personality. The program mixed travel reality with fan-interaction elements, and Zhou Mi’s bilingual abilities and easygoing charm made him a central figure. In September 2014, Zhou Mi and his labelmate Victoria and Amber made joint appearances in Taipei, Taiwan, representing the South Korean fashion retail group ELAND, which helped merge Korean streetwear trends with the local market. On October 22, 2014, Zhou Mi became an MC for season 4 of the SBS MTV's music program The Show with Park Ji-yeon (T-ara) and Hongbin (VIXX). His first solo EP Rewind was released on October 31, 2014. This single featured members of each sub-group of EXO as rappers - the Chinese version featured EXO-M's rapper Tao, and the Korean version featured EXO-K's rapper Chanyeol. All tracks on his debut album were written by Zhou Mi himself. In December 2014, Zhou Mi and his labelmate TRAX performed on Immortal Songs: Singing the Legend (불후의 명곡: 전설을 노래하다): Lee Bong Jo, they performed a song entitled "Despite Your Smile (웃는 얼굴 다정해도)" by Yoon Bok-hee.

=== 2015–2019: Acting role, What's Your Number?, and fanmeeting ===
Zhou Mi appeared as the Talk MC on the new season of fashion survival show Fashion King - Secret Box, which premiered on April 25, 2015. This was a survival show starring top Korean and Chinese celebrities. In 2015, Zhou Mi was cast in the drama Best Couple He played as Yan Xi Cheng, who comes from a poor background and through hard work becomes a top star. He finds himself emotionally involved with his first love, fake wife and admirer. This drama is set in the modern day Korean entertainment industry and is the first TV production project from China's e-commerce company Alibaba. This drama aired in China in early 2016, and garnered more than 100 million views. Zhou Mi also participated in Super Junior special album, Devil, was released to celebrate the group's 10th anniversary. He wrote lyrics for "Forever with You", which was sung by Super Junior-M.

In early 2016, it was confirmed that Zhou Mi would continue to host the 5th season of SBS MTV The Show with new co-MC, GFriend's Yerin. He stepped down from his MC position on August 2 of that year, having hosted The Show for almost two years. Zhou Mi hosted The Goddess Beauty Club alongside Patty Hou On February 23, 2016. Zhou Mi's second EP What's Your Number? was released on July 19, 2016. He wrote the Chinese lyrics for the lead single "What's Your Number?" and "Empty Room". Zhou Mi and his labelmate Kim Heechul & Kim Jungmo performed Pro And Amateur (프로와 아마추어) on Immortal Songs: Singing the Legend (불후의 명곡: 전설을 노래하다).

Zhou Mi came to the Hong Kong Convention and Exhibition Centre to attend the "2017 A & B Film and Celebrity Signing Conference" to spend White Day with his fans. On June 16 2017, it was announced that Zhou Mi hold his first fanmeeting in Japan in September 2017.

On April 19, 2018, Zhou Mi released a digital single entitled 'I Don't Care'. On the following day, he held a fan meeting in Beijing, China to celebrated his birthday with his fans. On December 26, 2018, Zhou Mi released a single entitled "The Lonely Flame", which was written and composed by himself. The music video was directed by fellow Super Junior member Shindong.

On May 6, 2019, Zhou Mi held a fan meeting in Tokyo, Japan, and the Japanese version of "The Lonely Flame" was released on November 23, 2019. Zhou Mi participated in the music event dedicated to the 70th anniversary of China and sang "Sing a Folk Song for the Party".

=== 2020–2025: Comeback to music and collaboration ===
On June 22, 2020, Zhou Mi collaborated with fellow Super Junior-M member Ryeowook for a song entitled "Starry Night". The Chinese version of the track was written and composed by himself. In 2020 and early 2021, Zhou Mi competed on Mystery Music Show: King of Mask Singer in China. Under "Big Daddy" he performed "Deep (無底洞)" by Tanya Chua and "Full Name (連名帶姓)" by A-Mei.

On April 8, 2022, Zhou Mi signed an exclusive contract with Bymon Entertainment who agreed to cooperate with SM Entertainment to manage his activities in China.

On June 1, 2023, Zhou Mi collaborated with fellow Super Junior-M member Eunhyuk to release a new single "Mañana (Our Drama)". The single was originally released in Korean and Chinese, the latter written by himself, and a Japanese version was released on July 24, 2023. On July 9, 2023, Zhou Mi competed on King of Mask Singer in South Korea. Under "Fish Bowl" he performed "Don’t Forget (잊지 말기로해)" by Jang Pil-soon & Kim Hyeon-cheol and "Nights Into Days (혼자서 걸어요)" by Taeyeon.

On January 1, 2024, Zhou Mi released the single "And" from the Casting in the Corner project with Sin Ye-young. "And" aimed to reinterpret the retro R&B of the 90s. On June 29, 2024, Zhou Mi collaborated with Zhang Liyin released a new single, "Don't Go Today", through Easy Entertainment, as a remake of the original by Ben and Im Se-jun. "Don't Go Today" was released in both Korean and Chinese. On August 5, 2024, Super Junior-D&E collaborated with Siwon, Zhou Mi, Ryeowook, and Kyuhyun to release a new single entitled "Promise". The lyrics were written by Zhou Mi in collaboration with Super Junior co-member Donghae. On September 11, 2024, Zhou Mi featured WayV Hendery to release a new single entitled "Utopia". "Utopia" is a pop genre song that combines bright, warm and grand sounds and rich vocals with positive energy, and the lyrics that capture the endless progress toward the utopia of one's dreams are impressive. The Chinese version of the track was written by himself. On October 30, 2024, Zhou Mi collaborated with Chanyeol to release a new singled entitled "Goodbye Goodnight (GBGN)". This track was written by himself. On November 13, 2024, it was announced that Zhou Mi would be releasing a new single "Ex Games" on November 21.

In 2025, Zhou Mi starred in The Monsoon of Love Passes By as Jifeng, a rich second generation man who came to the city to escape from marriage, which premiered in April 2025 on Youku. He also participated OST for this drama entitled "All Love". In July 2025, Zhou Mi was appointed as SM Entertainment's China Director. Zhou Mi had already started working in the first half of 2025. On December 17, 2025 he was invited to Sina Entertainment New Wave Forum Year End Session as a representative of SM Entertainment.

=== 2026-present: Comeback with 6570 and focus as SM Entertainment's China Director ===
Zhou Mi marked a heartfelt return to solo activities with the release of his new Chinese digital single titled "6570" on April 19, 2026 on his 40th birthday. This release is widely regarded as his first solo comeback in several years, and he turned it into a deeply personal gift to his fans by heavily involving himself in the creative process. He wrote the lyrics, co-composed the track alongside CQ and Z, served as the producer, handled the background vocals, and even directed the rap and vocal elements. All instruments were performed by CQ and Z, while the special video's animation and album cover were designed by Lee Sungho, adding a polished yet intimate touch to the project.The title "6570" draws from popular Chinese internet number slang, where the numbers phonetically represent the phrase "Do you still love me?". The song carries a sweet, romantic, and reflective vibe, blending heartfelt emotions with Zhou Mi's signature smooth vocals and a modern Mandopop sound. On April 26, 2026, Zhou Mi attended Weibo International Entertainment Award and represented SM Entertainment to accept the award for "Influential International Entertainment Company" on behalf of the company. Zhou Mi attend on SM Entertainment opened SMTOWN STORE Shanghai on May 1, 2026. Zhou Mi served as the producer and vocal producer for Sehun's first Mandarin solo single titled "Fade", which was released on July 29, 2026. On August 27, SM Entertainment announced that it had established STE, a joint venture with Tencent Music Entertainment Group (TME) in Beijing, China, and appointed Zhou Mi as its CEO.

== Artistry ==
=== Musical style ===
Zhou Mi's musical style primarily blends K-pop, Mandopop, R&B, and ballad elements, with a strong emphasis on smooth, melodic delivery and emotional storytelling.

=== Influences ===
Zhou Mi has cited Kangta as a major role model and mentor in his musical career. He has mentioned turning to Kangta for guidance, particularly when facing vocal difficulties or creative challenges during the production of his 2014 solo mini-album Rewind, where Kangta provided advice on song arrangement and vocal delivery. Zhou Mi's early interest in music was shaped by listening to a wide range of CDs as a child, and he drew inspiration from diverse sources including movies, personal life experiences, and love stories shared by friends when writing lyrics.

=== Voice and timbre ===
Zhou Mi typically operates in the tenor range, which often spans around C3 to C5, focusing on a brighter, higher register common in Mandopop ballads and K-pop performance which features a rich yet gentle resonance particularly well-suited to R&B, ballads, and mid-tempo pop tracks. His voice is often described as melodic and clear, with a distinctive tone that conveys warmth and vulnerability without heavy belting or sharp edges. As the main vocalist of Super Junior-M, he has demonstrated stable live delivery in both Mandarin and Korean, blending softness with subtle depth that allows for expressive phrasing and emotional performing.

=== Videos and stage ===
Zhou Mi's music videos and stage performances reflect his elegant and expressive artistry. His solo music videos, such as the 2014 title track "Rewind", typically feature stylish choreography with simple yet effective dance moves — including signature hand gestures like the "rewind" motion — combined with polished visuals, outfit changes, and narrative elements depicting emotional regret and longing. On stage, Zhou Mi is recognized for his strong live vocal ability, delivering crisp, emotive, and stable performances even during demanding Super Junior-M concerts, solo stages, and music show appearances.

== Public image and impact ==
As the native Mandarin speaker in group, Zhou Mi played a central role in helping the Korean members with their Mandarin pronunciation and lyrics delivery for SJ-M songs and Chinese versions of Super Junior tracks. Debuting in 2008 with Super Junior-M, Zhou Mi was among the early non-Korean members in a major SM group. Super Junior-M targeted the Chinese market with Mandarin songs, helping expand K-pop's reach in China during its formative international phase. He has been praised for facilitating communication between Korean and Chinese sides, contributing to lyrics, promotions, and cross-cultural understanding.

== Other ventures ==
=== Philanthropy ===
On December 14, 2018, The China Population Welfare Foundation (CPWF) held the ‘Healthy Together, Happy Together - Creating Happy Families Activity Theme Publicity Activity’ at the Beijing International Convention Centre. Zhou Mi was not only invited to attend the event as a volunteer representative, but was also honoured to receive the certificate of China Population Welfare Foundation's Ambassador of Love, which was presented by the foundation's leadership.

In 2020, Zhou Mi collaborated with two members of WayV, Kun and Xiaojun, on the single "I'll Be There", which was released on February 28, 2020. The track was written and composed by himself. "I'll Be There" was a tribute song for the frontline workers and those who were affected by COVID-19, especially in his hometown of Wuhan, China.

On May 11, 2022, during COVID-19 epidemic Zhou Mi serve as a volunteer in Beijing.

On October 19, 2024, Zhou Mi was invited by Half Smile Foundation to promote the art shirts derived from the paintings of by Autism Spectrum Disorder (ASD) children. The event aimed to promote art shirts designed with artwork created to highlighted their unique talents and fostering greater public understanding and inclusion of individuals with autism. The initiative also likely served as a fundraising or awareness campaign to support programs for autistic children.

On December 23, 2024, Zhou Mi was invited by The "Dream Planting Project" as a speaker which was held at a middle school in Altay City, Xinjiang, the event involved over 700 students and teachers. This is a charity activity focused on inspiring and supporting teenagers in remote areas. It aims to encourage self-exploration and ignite dreams through career-sharing sessions, guiding youths toward their future career paths.

On April 13, 2025, Zhou Mi was invited by Smile Guardian Warm Heart Meal program to deliver warm breakfasts to teenagers from struggling families. Every time a volunteer sells a coaster, they would be donate a breakfast to children in mountain areas.

In early March 2026, Zhou Mi and Ryeowook participated in a volunteer charity activity, where they helped paint a mural on the exterior wall of the Kkum Plus Center at Seoul Kkumna-mu Village. This center supports self-reliant young adults, often youth aging out of orphanages or care facilities with independence preparation programs.

== Discography ==
=== Extended plays ===
- Rewind (2014)
- What's Your Number? (2016)

== Bibliography ==
=== Scrapbook ===
Title	Year	Language	Author	Publisher	ISBN	Ref.
Thai Perfect (泰玩美) (Note: Traditional Chinese released: April 7, 2013 and Simplified Chinese released: December 5, 2013.)	2013	Chinese	Zhou Mi	China Field Publishing	ISBN 9789868592865	

== Fan meeting ==
Year	Date	Session	City	Country	Venue	Ref.
ELF-JAPAN Presents ZHOU MI FAN MEETING
2017	September 30	1	Tokyo	Japan	Yamano Hall	
2017	September 30	2	Tokyo	Japan	Yamano Hall	
2018	February 12	1	Osaka	Japan	Matsushita IMP Hall	
2018	February 12	2	Osaka	Japan	Matsushita IMP Hall	
2019	May 6	1	Tokyo	Japan	Yamano Hall	
2019	May 6	2	Tokyo	Japan	Yamano Hall	
ZHOU MI Birthday Party FAN MEETING
2018	April 19		Beijing	China	Beijing Station	
THE DAY with ZHOU MI
2019	October 28		Bangkok	Thailand	M THEATRE	
ZHOU MI Fan Meeting 「Falling Love」
2023	July 22	1	Tokyo	Japan	Yamano Hall	
2023	July 22	2	Tokyo	Japan	Yamano Hall	
2023	November 4	1	Osaka	Japan	Zepp Namba	
2023	November 4	2	Osaka	Japan	Zepp Namba	

== Awards and nominations ==
Name of the award ceremony, year presented, category, nominee of the award, and the result of the nomination
Award	Year	Category	Nominated work	Result	Ref.
9th China Music Festival	2013	Best Chinese Song	Distant Embrace (距離的擁抱)	Won	
9th China Music Festival	2013	Internet Popularity Award	Zhou Mi	Won	
9th China Music Festival	2013	Best Singer (Golden Melody Awards)	Zhou Mi	Won	
11th Asian Music Festival	2014	Best Singer in Asia	Zhou Mi	Won	
Apollo Oscar Music Awards	2014	Best Music Video	Rewind	Nominated	
HK Metro Radio Hits Music Awards	2015	Best Chinese Song Award	Rewind	Won	
HK Metro Radio Hits Music Awards	2015	Best Chinese Singer	Zhou Mi	Won	
HK Metro Radio Hits Music Awards	2015	Best Dancer of The Year	Zhou Mi	Won	
Mobile Video Festival	2016	Star of The Year	Zhou Mi	Won	
OK! Sing Style Music Awards	2017	Cross-boarded Idol Popular Award	Zhou Mi	Won	
SBS PopAsia Awards	2014	Best Solo Artist	Zhou Mi	Nominated	
Shanghai Silk Road Cohesion Awards	2018	Singer of The Year	Zhou Mi	Won	
Weibo Music Awards	2024	Stage Charm of The Year	Zhou Mi	Won	
Weibo Music Awards	2025	Promising Artist of The Year	Zhou Mi	Won	
Fashion Awards
COSMO Fashion Beauty Festival	2016	Breakthrough Idol of the Year	Zhou Mi	Won	
COSMO Fashion Beauty Festival	2017	Beauty Icon of the Year	Zhou Mi	Won	
Ruili Sunshine Fund	2017	A Model of Vibrant Philanthropy	Zhou Mi	Won	
Pre-Debut
China Mobile Moves the Land "Emotional New Voices" Competition	2005	Newcomer Award	Zhou Mi	Won	
China Mobile Moves the Land "Emotional New Voices" Competition	2005	Best Singer	Zhou Mi	Won	
Converse School Campus Music Festival	2005	Best Singer	Zhou Mi	Won	
Happy Camp: Wenquxing Crazy for the Stars Star Ambassador Selection Competition	2003	Energetic Star	Zhou Mi	Won	
Hosting Competition: Challenging the Host	2006	Best Choices (Guangzhou Area)	Zhou Mi	Won	
Hosting Competition: Challenging the Host	2006	Final Top 16	Zhou Mi	(Note: Dropped out of competition to go to Korea)	
MTV Music Nation Idol Competition	2005	Best Singer (Guangdong Area)	Zhou Mi	3rd	
MTV Music Nation Idol Competition	2005	Best Singer	Zhou Mi	Won	
MTV Olay New Talent Competition	2005	Best Performer (Guangdong Area)	Zhou Mi	Won	
MTV Pantene New Voices Competition	2002	Best Male Singer (Beijing Area)	Zhou Mi	Won	
MTV Pantene New Voices Competition	2002	Best Male Singer	Zhou Mi	Won	
MTV Samsung School Campus: Breath of Fresh Air Singing Competition	2005	University Idol Singer Award	Zhou Mi	Won	
Shanghai Asia Music Festival Newcomer Competition	2004	Best Male Singer (Beijing Area)	Zhou Mi	Won	
Shanghai Asia Music Festival Newcomer Competition	2004	Newcomer Award	Zhou Mi	Nominated	
S.M. UCC CONTEST Celebrity Challenge "Explosive! Category"	2007	Most Strongly Recommended	Zhou Mi	Won	
Warner Music Singing Competition	2005	Best Male Singer	Zhou Mi	Won	
