= Victoria Song =

Chinese singer and actress (born 1987)

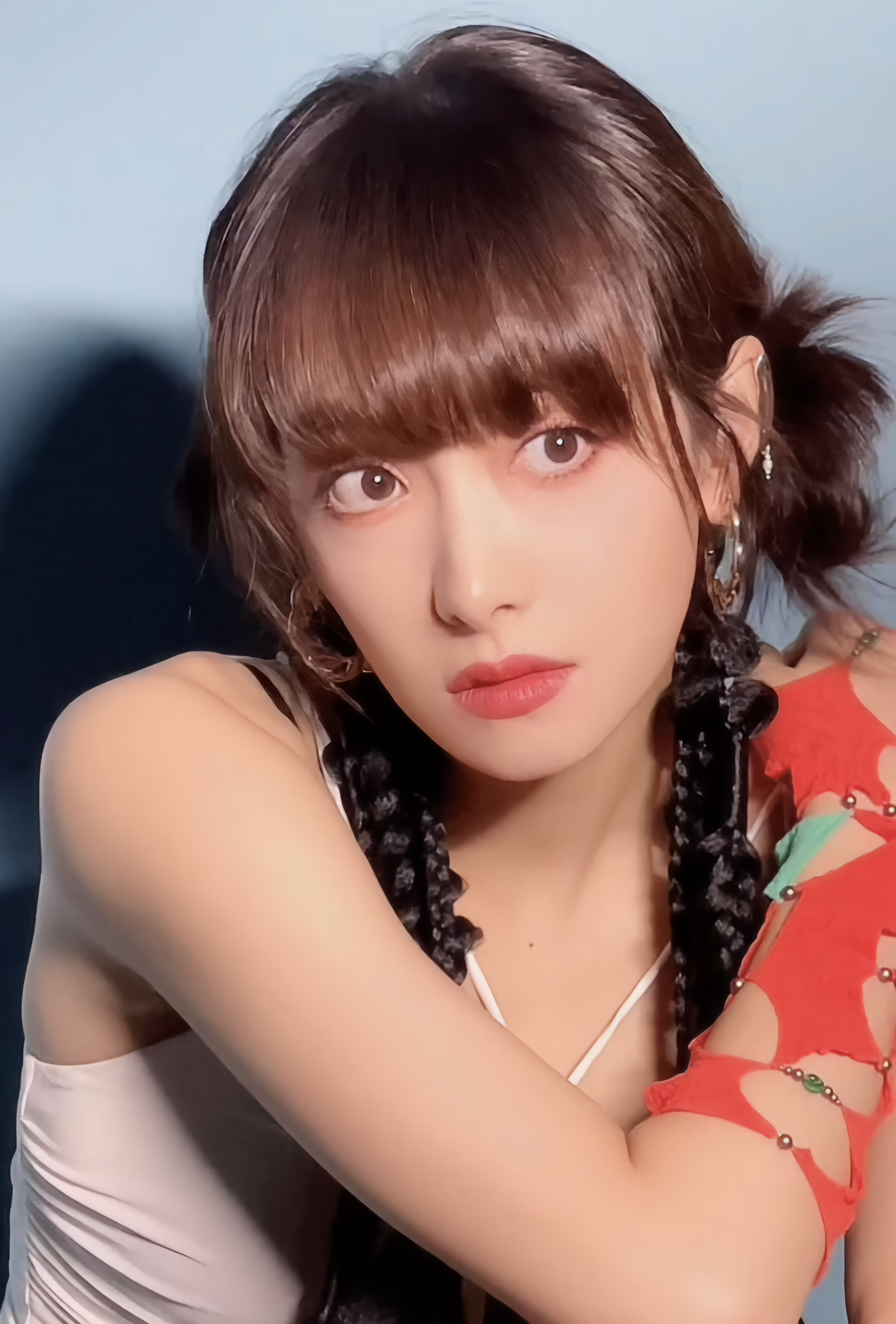
- Song in January 2024
- Born: Song Qian; February 2, 1987 (age 39); Qingdao, Shandong, China
- Occupations: Singer; dancer; actress; model; host; author
- Years active: 2009–present
- Agent: Victoria Studio
- Musical career
- Genres: K-pop; Mandopop; R&B; EDM
- Instruments: Vocals
- Label: SM
- Member of: f(x)

Chinese name
- Chinese: 宋茜
Transcriptions
Standard Mandarin
- Hanyu Pinyin: Sòng Qiàn
Yue: Cantonese
- Jyutping: Sung3 Sin6

Signature
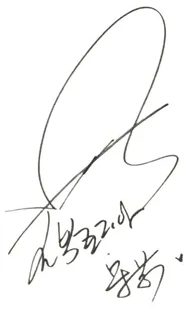

Song Qian (Chinese: 宋茜; born February 2, 1987), known professionally as Victoria or Victoria Song, is a Chinese singer, dancer, actress, model, host and author known for her work as the leader of South Korean girl group f(x). She made her solo debut in May 2020 with her eponymous studio album.

In South Korean television, Song gained fame as a cast member of We Got Married and Invincible Youth. She has also acted in various Chinese drama series such as When Love Walked In (2012), Beautiful Secret (2015), Ice Fantasy (2016), A Life Time Love (2017), Moonshine and Valentine (2018), Find Yourself (2020); and the films My New Sassy Girl (2016), My Best Friend's Wedding (2016), and Wished (2017).

Song ranked 74th on Forbes China Celebrity 100 list in 2017, 41st in 2019, and 14th in 2020.

== Life and career ==
=== 1987–2011: Early life and career beginnings ===
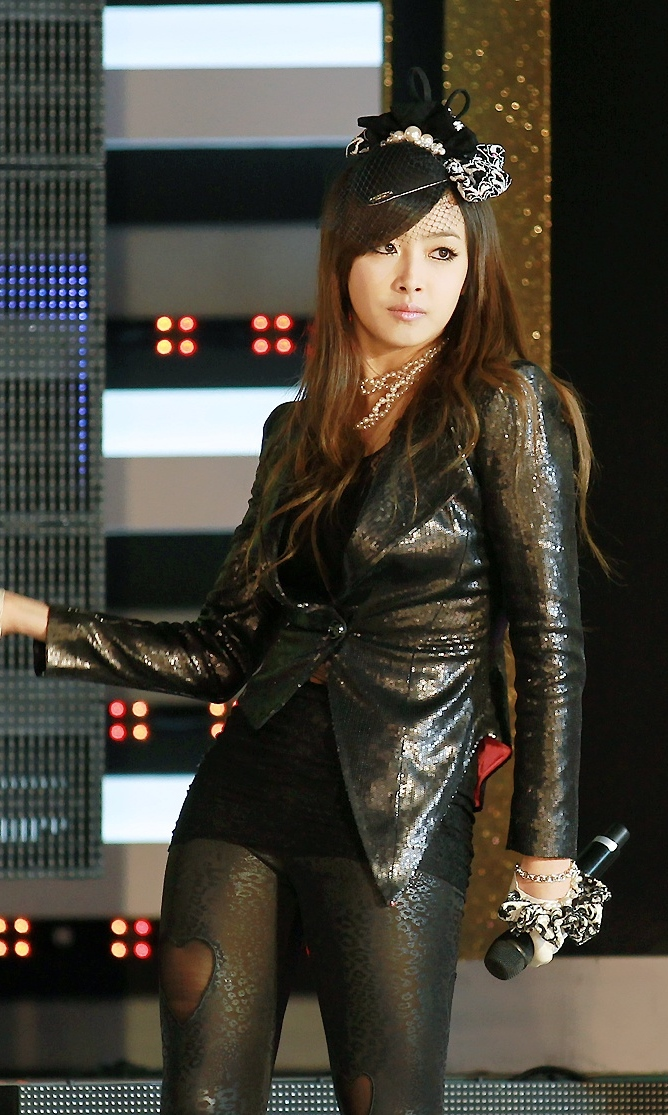
Song performing at the 2010 SBS Gayo Daejeon

Song Qian was born in Qingdao, Shandong. She left her hometown at a young age to study Chinese traditional dance at the Beijing Dance Academy. After her high school graduation, she was accepted to the Beijing Dance Academy and majored in Chinese ethnic dance. In September 2007, Song was first scouted by an SM Entertainment casting agent while in Beijing dance competition and eventually cast into SM Entertainment after passing the audition under SM Casting System. She was originally trained to prepare for her acting and modeling career in South Korea. Prior to debuting, Song was introduced to the public through various appearances in music videos and commercials; her first appearance was in a Spris commercial with Lee Joon-gi in early 2008. She made her official debut as a member of f(x) in September 2009.

In June 2010, Song became a cast member for the first season of KBS's variety show Invincible Youth in which she was a part of G7, consisting of 7 female idols from various groups. She was also cast on MBC's reality show We Got Married with Nichkhun of 2PM. The couple was collectively known as Khuntoria in the variety show. Nichkhun and Song both gained entertainment-wide popularity as a result of the show's success. At the end of the year, Song won the Popularity Award at the MBC Entertainment Awards for her stint in We Got Married.

=== 2012–2017: Acting roles and rise in popularity ===
In January 2012, Song was cast to play the lead role in the Chinese-Taiwanese co-production When Love Walked In, alongside label-mate Zhou Mi and Calvin Chen of the group Fahrenheit. The drama reached the number one spot in viewership ratings. She won the 'Best New Actress' award at the China TV Drama Awards for her performance. In December 2012, Song released a photo-essay book titled Victoria's Hong-Ma, which included her travel experiences in Hong Kong and Macao. The Chinese version of the book was subsequently released in 2013.

In 2013 she became the MC for KBS's program Glitter alongside actress Kim So-eun.

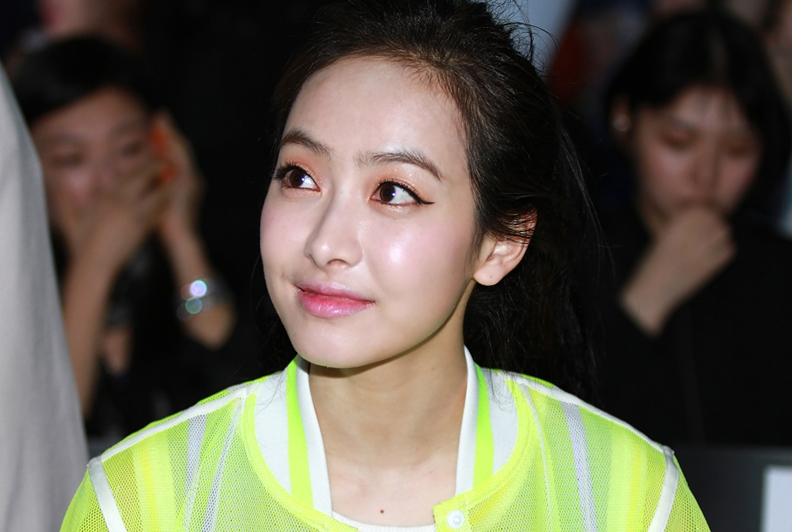
Song at the 2014 Seoul Fashion Week

In 2014, Song was chosen to host the Korean-Chinese variety show titled Strongest Group together with Zhou Mi. She was also featured in his solo album single, titled "Loving You". Song then starred in Zhang Liyin's music videos "Agape" and "Not Alone" as the lead female character alongside former EXO member Tao.

In 2015, it was also revealed that Song would team up with Chinese manager Jia Shikai for her local activities. Following the setup of her studio, Song starred in Hunan TV's music romance drama Beautiful Secret. She released a solo single titled "Star Tears" for the drama's soundtrack. The drama eventually went on to record the highest average viewership ratings for the first half of 2016 in China.

In 2016, Song starred in My New Sassy Girl with Cha Tae-hyun. The film, a remake of My Sassy Girl (2001), was released simultaneously in South Korea and China. She then appeared in the Chinese remake film of My Best Friend's Wedding, playing the role of Kimberly Wallace in the original film. The same year, Song starred in Ice Fantasy, an epic fantasy drama adapted from the novel of the same name by Guo Jingming. She sang an OST for Ice Fantasy, titled "Li Luo", which is also her character's name in the drama. Song was next cast in the modern romance drama Endless August by Anni Baobei alongside Rain.

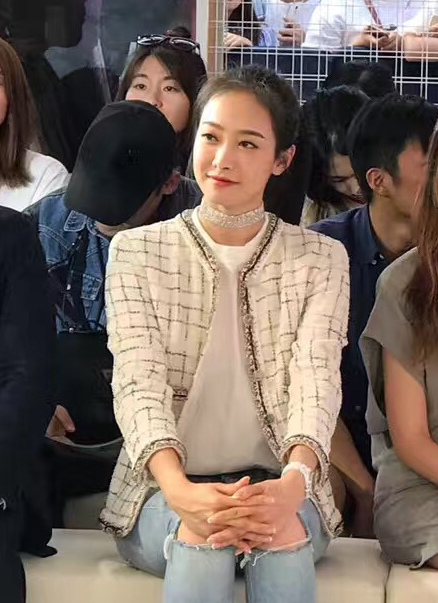
Song at a fashion show in 2017

From January to April 2017, Song co-hosted the variety program Ace vs Ace. She also became a fixed cast on Zhejiang TV's Beat The Champions, which started airing in April. In June, she starred alongside Huang Xiaoming in the fantasy romance drama A Life Time Love, based on the novel Once Promised by Tong Hua. In July, she co-starred in fantasy comedy film Wished, directed by Dayyan Eng, which garnered good reviews for Song and had the highest audience scores across the top 4 ticketing platforms for local Chinese comedies released that summer. In August, she joined the cast of Hunan TV's female-centric reality show Up Idol.

=== 2018–present: Solo debut, acting and debut album ===
In January 2018, Song starred in The Chronicles of Town Called Jian, a mystery period drama produced by Li Shaohong; based on the "Tarot Goddess Sleuths" series. The drama has previously completed filming in 2014.

On March 13, 2018, she released her debut solo single "Roof on Fire" along with its music video. She has also joined the dance-oriented variety show, Hot Blood Dance Crew, and talent scouting program The Next Top Bang as a mentor.

In May 2018, Song starred in fantasy romance drama Moonshine and Valentine alongside Huang Jingyu. The series received positive reviews, and Song was praised for her acting performance. In October she starred in the fantasy adventure film Legend of the Ancient Sword, based on the video game Gu Jian Qi Tan 2. The same year, she was cast in modern romance drama Broker alongside Luo Yunxi, playing an intelligent and beautiful scientist.

On September 5, 2019, Song announced that her contract with SM Entertainment had expired and that she would be leaving the company. On the same day, SM Entertainment announced that Song had not yet left the company, but rather the two were finding new ways to work together.

In 2019, Song starred in the modern romance dramas Love Under the Moon and sang the opening theme song "Practice To Be Friends". In 2020, Song starred in the romantic comedy drama Find Yourself. The drama was a huge hit and Song gained further recognition for her role as a working woman who is inexperienced in love.

On May 19, 2020, Song released her self-titled solo album digitally after being postponed since 2017. The album consists of ten tracks, including the previously released single "Roof on Fire" (2018) and three English-language tracks. The lead single, "Up To Me" was also released in the same day along with its music video. The album sold over 250,000 copies in its first 22 hours of pre-sale, making Victoria Song the fastest Chinese female artist to reach diamond certification on QQ Music in 2020. The album reached No. 1 place on QQ Music after sold over than 300,000 copies in the first weeks. In the next few weeks, she also released music videos for "怀念" and "官能支配 (Functional Control)".

In the summer of 2020, Song participated in the 2020 edition of the Chinese version of Produce 101, called Chuang 2020 where she was an MC and a mentor. She also performed on the show.

In August 2020, Song's female-centric drama Love Yourself was released both in China and Internationally. She stars as a television reporter who is lost about love.

In 2021, Song terminated her endorsement contract with the clothing manufacturer H&M after it criticized China for human rights violations against Uyghurs in the Xinjiang region of China where cotton for clothing products is grown. In April 2021, SM Entertainment announced that their contract with Song had ended.

In 2022, Song starred in Beloved Life as Du Di, a resident Ob-gyn.

In 2023, Song took the role of Han Lu in the film Post Truth. She had been on a roadshow around China to promote the film.

In 2024, she starred next to Chen Xingxu as Lin Xi in the business romance Our Interpreter, which aired in January 2024 on Hunan TV. In July 2024, she was announced the Global Ambassador and Face of the "I want Choo" fragrance line by Jimmy Choo.

== Philanthropy ==
In 2008, Song and Super Junior-M participated in a campaign for Chinese athletes during the 2008 Beijing Summer Olympics. In 2010, she and fellow f(x) members were appointed ambassadors for a blood donation campaign for "World Blood Donor Day". The following year, she participated in the press conference to promote awareness for a fundraising campaign to help children in Africa, which was jointly organized by the Red Cross and UNICEF.

In November 2012, she and Kangta also attended a cultural charity event in China, where they gave music and dance lessons to children in need. The event was organized by SM Entertainment and CJ E&M to celebrate 20 years of China and South Korea's diplomatic ties.

Towards the end of 2014, Song opened a flea market where she sold her personal items for charity. She donated all proceeds to UNICEF on December 31. In April 2015, she and other Beautiful Secret cast members launched "Beautiful Childhood Secret" to promote awareness for children with hearing disabilities. The members and crew ordered customized picture books for the disabled children. In the same month, Song also auctioned off a handmade doll, named "Song Song", on the UNICEF charity auction site and in June, she participated in UNICEF's "Help Nepal Children" charity bracelet project.

== Discography ==
=== Studio albums ===
Title	Album details	Sales
Victoria	Released: May 19, 2020; Label: Shanghai Song Qian Film and Television Culture Studio (Victoria Studio); Formats: Digital download, streaming	CHN: 513,100

=== Singles ===
Title	Year	Peak chart positions		Album
Title	Year	CHN		Album
Title	Year	Billboard	QQ	Album
"Roof on Fire" (屋顶着火)	2018	2	9	Victoria
"Up To Me"	2020	—	—	Victoria
"—" denotes releases that did not chart or were not released in that region.

=== Collaborations ===
Title	Year	Peak chart positions	Album
Title	Year	CHN Baidu Chart	Album
"Loving You" (Zhou Mi feat. Victoria Song)	2014	13	Rewind
"Salute to the Heroes" (致敬勇士) (with various)	2021	—	non-album single
"Wave" (浪潮) (with Xu Weizhou)	2022	—	China Winter Sports album
"Chinese Dream, My Dream" (中国梦·我的梦) (with various)	2022	—	non-album singles
"Our Song" (我们的歌) (with various)	2022	—	non-album singles

=== Soundtracks ===
Title	Year	Peak chart positions		Album
Title	Year	CHN Baidu Chart	CHN Billboard V Chart	Album
"Star Tears" (星星泪)	2015	1	10	Beautiful Secret OST
"Dear Child" (亲爱的小孩)	2015	—	—	Beautiful Secret OST
"I Believe"	2016	6	2	My New Sassy Girl OST
"Li Luo" (梨落)	2016	—	9	Ice Fantasy OST
"Jiu Long Jue" (九龙诀)	2016	—	—	Zhe Tian 3D Mobile Game Theme Song
"Peach Blossom Source" (桃花源)	2016	—	—	Tao Hua Yuan Ji 2 Online Game Theme Song
"Ace vs. Ace" (王牌对王牌) (with Wong Cho-lam & Roy Wang)	2017	—	—	Ace vs Ace Season 2
"You are an Idol" (你是偶像) (with Rosamund Kwan, Jiang Xin, Michelle Chen, Shen Mengchen, Tang Yixin, Wang Han & Wu Xiubo)	2017	—	—	Up Idol Season 2
"Heart Signal" (心动的信号)	2019	—	—	Heart Signal 2 Theme Song
"Practice To Be Friends" (练习当朋友) (with Oho Ou)	2019	—	—	Love Under the Moon OST
"I Want Your Love" (我要你的爱) (with Celina Jade, Zhang Jianing & Li Chun)	2020	—	—	Love Yourself OST
"Mirror City" (镜城) (with WXWZ)	2020	—	—	Honor of Kings Online Game Theme Song
"Long Wind" (长风送)	2021	—	—	Luoyang OST
"Happy Crying" (幸福的哭泣)	2022	—	—	Beloved Life OST
"Just Goodbye" (不过是，再见)	2022	—	—	Almost Lover OST
"Play" (出手)	2023	—	—	Game for Peace Mobile Game Theme Song
"Just 2023" (刚好2023) (with various)	2023	—	—	Wonderland 3 Theme Song
"A Person’s Piece of Blue" (一个人的一片蓝)	2024	—	—	Reblooming Blue OST
"Divas Hit The Road" (花儿与少年) (with Chen Hao, Liu Ye, Jin Chen, Zhou Yutong, Deng Enxi, Hou Minghao, Tian Jiarui & Rong Zishan)	2024	—	—	Divas Hit The Road 6 Theme Song
"—" denotes releases that did not chart or were not released in that region.

== Filmography ==
=== Film ===
Year	English title	Original title	Role	Notes/Ref.
2012	I AM.		Herself	
2015	SM TOWN Live: The Stage		Herself	
2016	My New Sassy Girl	我的新野蛮女友	Sassy	
2016	My Best Friend's Wedding	我最好朋友的婚礼	Meng Yixuan	
2017	Wished	反转人生	Ren Shanshan	Special appearance
2017	City of Rock	缝纫机乐队	Qian Qian	Cameo
2018	Legend of the Ancient Sword	古剑奇谭之流月昭明	Wenren Yu	
2021	The Pioneer	革命者	Chen Xiujuan	
2023	Post Truth	保你平安	Han Lu	
2026	Per Aspera Ad Astra	星河入梦	Li Simeng	

=== Television series ===
Year	English title	Chinese title	Role	Notes/Ref.
2012	When Love Walked In	爱情闯进门	Shen Yayin	
2015–2016	Beautiful Secret	美丽的秘密	Jiang Meili / Rou Rou	
2016	Ice Fantasy	幻城	Li Luo	
2017	Ice Fantasy Destiny	幻城凡世	Li Luo	Cameo
2017	A Life Time Love	上古情歌	Muqing Mo / Xuanyang Ruo	
2018	The Chronicles of Town Called Jian	茧镇奇缘	Du Chunxiao	
2018	Moonshine and Valentine	结爱·千岁大人的初恋	Guan Pipi	
2019	Love Under the Moon	山月不知心底事	Xiang Yuan	
2020	Find Yourself	下一站是幸福	He Fanxing	
2020	Love Yourself	他其实没有那么爱你	Sun Yihe	
2021	Lover or Stranger	陌生的恋人	Luo Qianyi / Xiao Dong	
2021	Broker	心跳源计划	Qiu Jianing	
2021	Luoyang	风起洛阳	Wu Siyue	
2022	Beloved Life	亲爱的生命	Du Di	
2022	Almost Lover	谁都知道我爱你	He Xiaoran	
2023	Warm and Sweet	温暖的甜蜜的	Nan Fei	
2024	The Interpreter	我们的翻译官	Lin Xi	
2024	Reblooming Blue	另一种蓝	Chen Xiaoman	
2025	Fight for Love	山河枕	Chu Yu	

=== Variety shows ===
Year	English title	Original title	Role	Notes/Ref.
2010	Invincible Youth	청춘불패	Cast member	Episodes 33–58
2010–2011	We Got Married 2	우리 결혼했어요	Cast member	with 2PM's Nichkhun (Episodes 52–91)
2011	We Got Married 3	우리 결혼했어요	Cast member	with 2PM's Nichkhun (Episodes 1–24)
2013	Glitter	글리터	Co-host	
2014	The Strongest Group	最强天团	Co-host	
2014	Superstar China	我的中国星	Judge	
2015	Sisters Over Flowers	花样姐姐	Cast member	
2017	Ace vs Ace	王牌对王牌	Co-host	
2017	Beat The Champions 2	来吧冠军2	Co-host	
2017	Up Idol 3	偶像来了	Cast member	
2018	Hot Blood Dance Crew	热血街舞团	Mentor	
2018	The Next Top Bang	下一站传奇	Mentor	
2019	Heart Signal 2	心动的信号2	Panelist	
2020	My Little One	我家那闺女2	Cast member	
2020	CHUANG 2020	创造营 2020	Mentor	
2024	Divas Hit the Road 6	花儿与少年6	Cast member	

== Bibliography ==
Year	Name	Language	ISBN
2012	Victoria's HongMa (Hong Kong & Macau)	Korean	978-89-01-15254-7
2013	宋茜的港澳隨筆	Chinese	978-71-22-18499-3

== Accolades ==
=== Awards and nominations ===
Year	Award	Category	Nominated work	Result	Ref.
2010	MBC Entertainment Awards	Popularity Award	We Got Married	Won	
2012	4th China TV Drama Awards	Best New Actress	When Love Walked In	Won	
2015	Powerstar Award Ceremony	Most Popular Actress	—N/a	Won	
2015	Sohu Fashion Awards	Most Popular Female Celebrity	—N/a	Won	
2015	4th iQIYI All-Star Carnival	Asian Popular Idol Award	—N/a	Won	
2016	18th Huading Awards	Best New Actress	Beautiful Secret	Nominated	
2016	19th Huading Awards	Best Actress (Contemporary Drama)	Beautiful Secret	Nominated	
2016	Jumei Award Ceremony	Fashion Icon Goddess Award	—N/a	Won	
2016	LeEco Night	Most Promising Actress	—N/a	Won	
2016	Weibo Fan Festival	Powerstar Ranking: Person of the Year	—N/a	Won	
2016	Mobile Video Festival	Broadcast Influencer Award	—N/a	Won	
2016	8th Macau International Movie Festival	Best Supporting Actress	My Best Friend's Wedding	Nominated	
2016	5th iQiyi All-Star Carnival	Popular Actress Award	Ice Fantasy	Won	
2016	8th China TV Drama Awards	Popular Actress Award	Ice Fantasy	Won	
2017	Weibo Night Awards	Breakthrough Actress Award	—N/a	Won	
2019	Golden Bud – The Fourth Network Film And Television Festival	Best Actress	Love Under The Moon	Nominated	
2019	Cosmo Glam Night	Person of the Year (Dream)	—N/a	Won	
2019	Tencent Video All Star Awards	Trendy Figure of the Year	—N/a	Won	
2019	11th China TV Drama Awards	Rising Actress	—N/a	Won	
2019	Jinri Toutiao Awards Ceremony	Most Anticipated Actress	—N/a	Won	
2020	Weibo Awards Ceremony	Popular Artist of the Year	—N/a	Won	
2020	30th China TV Golden Eagle Award	Audience's Choice for Actress	—N/a	Nominated	

=== Forbes China Celebrity 100 ===
Year	Rank	Ref.
2017	74th	
2019	42nd	
2020	14th	
