= Super Show 5 =

2013–14 concert tour by Super Junior

- World tour by Super Junior
- Promotion poster for Super Show 5
- Associated album: Sexy, Free & Single; Spy
- Start date: 23 March 2013
- End date: 22 February 2014
- Legs: 6
- No. of shows: 28
- Website: superjunior.smtown.com

Super Junior concert chronology
- Super Show 4 (2011–12); Super Show 5 (2013–14); Super Show 6 (2014–15)

Super Show 5 is the second world concert tour and fifth international tour by South Korean boy band Super Junior, in support of their sixth studio album, Sexy, Free & Single. The world tour commenced with two shows in Seoul in March 2013 and will continue onto South America, North America and Europe.

This tour marks the return of member Kangin, who was discharged from mandatory military service in April 2012, and the first one since Super Show 2 in 2009. However it is the second tour without Heechul, since Super Show 3, who enlisted in September 2011 and the first without leader Leeteuk, since Super Show 4, who enlisted on 30 October 2012.

== Concerts ==
On day two of the Seoul concerts, the nine members held a press conference at the Olympic Gymnastics Arena. Shindong said "the level of participation on our part was the highest in this concert. Our opinions were actively taken into account from choosing solo and group performances to picking stage costumes". Eunhyuk further explained "We participated in picking songs, organizing stages and choosing costumes", and that their agency took in their opinions. He added that they thought of fans who come to the show every year and decided to perform songs they have not done before. Former SM Entertainment and S.E.S. member Bada made a surprise appearance during Ryeowook's solo stage where he impersonated her.

Yesung announced at the Seoul concert that he will enlist for his mandatory military service in 2013. He enlisted on 6 May, and thus will not take part from the South American leg of the Tour onwards.

The South American leg of the tour marks the group's first exclusive concerts on the continent and the largest by a Korean artist. Super Junior's concert in Chile brought in 12,000 fans, and set a record as the largest audience for a Korean group in South America. Their concert in Brazil was the first independent concert by a Korean group in the country and was the only place that sold out in South America. They wrapped up the South American leg of the concert by performing in front of 40,000 fans overall.

The Super Show 5 concert held in Singapore brought the accumulated number of audience to witness "Super Show" concerts since 2008 to a million.

Super Junior's Super Show 5 held in Mexico on 7 November, sold out tickets in about 5 hours. It set the record of the largest audience for a "Super Show" performed outside of Asia as well as obtaining the record for most attended concert in Latin America for a Korean group, with 15,000 fans attending.

Super Show 5 drew to a very successful end on 22 February 2014, drawing in over 450,000 fans through the whole tour.

== Setlist ==
South Korea (Opening Weekend)

Super Junior Intro

- "Mr. Simple"
- "Bonamana"
- "Super Girl" (Korean ver.) - Super Junior-M with Yesung, Kangin and Shindong
- First MENT

First video interlude

- "It's You"

Second video interlude

- "Sexy, Free & Single" (Rearranged)
- "Boom Boom"
- "Club No.1"

Third video interlude

- "So Cold" - Eunhyuk, Donghae, Siwon, Henry
- 서른 즈음에 + 고향의 봄 ("About 30" + "Hometown's spring") - Kangin
- "How Am I Supposed to Live Without You" - Kyuhyun, Sungmin, Ryeowook, Zhoumi
- "Gray paper" - Yesung
- Dance Performance ft. "Harlem Shake" - Shindong, Eunhyuk, Donghae
- Cross dress performance:

"Saturday Night" of Son Dam-bi - Siwon
"Loving you" of S.E.S. - Ryeowook
"Bloom" of Gain - Kangin
"Ice Cream" of HyunA - Sungmin
"Alone" of Sistar - Siwon, Ryeowook, Kangin, Sungmin

Fourth video interlude

- "Break Down" (Korean ver.) - Super Junior-M
- "A-oh!" (Korean ver.) - Super Junior-M
- "Go" (Korean ver.) - Super Junior-M
- "Shake It Up!"
- "Rockstar"

Fifth video interlude

- 중 ("-ing") - Super Junior-K.R.Y
- "Daydream"
- Second MENT
- "Bittersweet" + "Someday" (medley)
- "Memories"

Sixth video interlude (Superheroes)

- "Dreaming Hero" with Zhoumi and Henry

Seventh video interlude (Dance tutorial)

- "Sunny" with Zhoumi and Henry
- "Wonder Boy" with Zhoumi and Henry

Eighth video interlude (SS1 Marry U)

- "Marry U"
- Third MENT

Encore

- "Sorry, Sorry"
- "Show Me Your Love" with Zhoumi and Henry
- "Sapphire Blue" with Zhoumi and Henry
- Fourth MENT
- "So I" with Zhoumi and Henry
Behind the scenes video
South America

Super Junior Intro

- "Mr. Simple"
- "Bonamana"
- "Super Girl" (Korean ver.) - Super Junior-M with Kangin and Shindong
- First MENT

First video interlude

- "It's You"

Second video interlude

- "Twins"
- "Galjeung (A Man in Love)"
- "Sexy, Free & Single" (Rearranged)
- "Spy"

Third video interlude

- "How Am I Supposed to Live Without You" - Kyuhyun, Sungmin, Ryeowook, Zhoumi
- "Oppa, Oppa" with Zhoumi and Henry
- "A-oh" (Korean ver.) - Super Junior-M
- "Ai se eu te pego" with Zhoumi and Henry

Fourth video interlude

- "Break Down" (Korean ver.) - Super Junior-M
- "Go" (Korean ver.) - Super Junior-M
- "Shake It Up!"
- "Rockstar"

Fifth video interlude

- "Daydream"
- Second MENT
- "Bittersweet" + "Someday" (medley)
- "Memories"

Sixth video interlude (Superheroes)

- "Dreaming Hero" with Zhoumi and Henry

Seventh video interlude (Dance tutorial)

- "Sunny" with Zhoumi and Henry
- "Wonder Boy" with Zhoumi and Henry
- Third MENT
- "So I" with Zhoumi and Henry

Encore

- "Sorry, Sorry"
- "Miracle" with Zhoumi and Henry
- "Dancing Out" with Zhoumi and Henry
- Fourth MENT
- "Marry U" with Zhoumi and Henry
Behind the scenes video
Tokyo, Japan

Super Junior Intro

- "Mr. Simple" (Japanese ver.)
- "Bonamana" (Japanese ver.)
- "Super Girl" (Korean ver.) - Super Junior-M with Kangin and Shindong
- First MENT

First video interlude

- "It's You"
- "Hero"

Second video interlude

- "Sexy, Free & Single" - Rearranged (Japanese ver.)
- "Boom Boom"
- "Club No.1"

Third video interlude

- "So Cold" - Eunhyuk, Donghae, Siwon, Henry
- "いのちの歌" - Kyuhyun, Sungmin, Ryeowook, Zhoumi
- Dance Performance ft. "Harlem Shake" - Shindong, Eunhyuk, Donghae
- Cross dress performance:

"Saturday Night" of Son Dam-bi - Siwon
"Loving you" of S.E.S. - Ryeowook
"Bloom" of Gain - Kangin
"Ice Cream" of HyunA - Sungmin
"Alone" of Sistar - Siwon, Ryeowook, Kangin, Sungmin

- "I Wanna Dance" - Super Junior-D&E

Fourth video interlude

- "Break Down" - Super Junior-M
- "A-oh!" - Super Junior-M
- "Go" - Super Junior-M
- "Shake It Up!"
- "Rockstar"

Fifth video interlude

- "Gray Paper" - Kyuhyun, Ryeowook
- "Daydream"
- Second MENT
- "Bittersweet" + "Someday" (medley)
- "Memories"

Sixth video interlude (Superheroes)

- "Tuxedo"
- "Wonder Boy" (Japanese ver.) with Zhoumi and Henry

Seventh video interlude (Dance tutorial)

- "Sunny" with Zhoumi and Henry
- "Dancing Out" with Zhoumi and Henry
- Third MENT
- "Marry U"
- Fourth MENT

Encore

- "Sorry, Sorry"
- "Bambina"
- "Sapphire Blue" with Zhoumi and Henry
- Fifth MENT
- "So I" with Zhoumi and Henry
Behind the scenes video
Mexico & London

Super Junior Intro

- "Mr. Simple"
- "Bonamana"
- "Super Girl" (Korean ver.)
- First MENT

First video interlude

- "It's You"

Second video interlude

- "Twins"
- "Galjeung (A Man in Love)"
- "Sexy, Free & Single" (Rearranged)
- "Spy"

Third video interlude

- "Isn't She Lovely" - Kyuhyun solo ft. Shindong
- Cross dress performance:

"Saturday Night" of Son Dam-bi - Siwon
"Loving you" of S.E.S. - Ryeowook
"Bloom" of Gain - Kangin
"Ice Cream" of HyunA - Sungmin
"Alone" of Sistar - Siwon, Ryeowook, Kangin, Sungmin

- "Hello" - Super Junior-D&E
- "Oppa, Oppa" - Super Junior-D&E ft. All Super Junior
- "A-oh" (Korean ver.) - Super Junior-M
- "Shake It Up!"
- "Rockstar"

Fifth video interlude

- "Gray Paper" - Kyuhyun, Ryeowook
- "Daydream"
- Second MENT
- "Bittersweet" + "Someday" (medley)
- "Memories"

Sixth video interlude (Superheroes)

- "Wonder Boy"

Seventh video interlude (Dance tutorial)

- "Sunny"
- Third MENT
- "So I"

Encore

- "Sorry, Sorry"
- "Miracle"
- "Dancing Out"
- Fourth MENT
- "Marry U"
Behind the scenes video

== Tour dates ==
Date	City	Country	Venue	Attendance
23 March 2013	Seoul	South Korea	Olympic Gymnastics Arena	20,000
24 March 2013	Seoul	South Korea	Olympic Gymnastics Arena	20,000
21 April 2013	São Paulo	Brazil	Credicard Hall	40,000
23 April 2013	Buenos Aires	Argentina	Luna Park	40,000
25 April 2013	Santiago	Chile	Movistar Arena	40,000
27 April 2013	Lima	Peru	Jockey Club del Perú	40,000
1 June 2013	Jakarta	Indonesia	Mata Elang International Stadium	—
2 June 2013	Jakarta	Indonesia	Mata Elang International Stadium	—
15 June 2013	Hong Kong	China	AsiaWorld–Arena	24,000
16 June 2013	Hong Kong	China	AsiaWorld–Arena	24,000
6 July 2013	Singapore		Singapore Indoor Stadium	7,000
27 July 2013	Tokyo	Japan	Tokyo Dome	110,000
28 July 2013	Tokyo	Japan	Tokyo Dome	110,000
3 August 2013	Bangkok	Thailand	Impact Arena	20,000
4 August 2013	Bangkok	Thailand	Impact Arena	20,000
10 August 2013	Taipei	Taiwan	Taipei Arena	30,000
11 August 2013	Taipei	Taiwan	Taipei Arena	30,000
12 August 2013	Taipei	Taiwan	Taipei Arena	30,000
24 August 2013	Shanghai	China	Mercedes-Benz Arena	10,000
14 September 2013	Guangzhou	China	Guangzhou International Sports Arena	10,000
24 October 2013	Manila	Philippines	SM Mall of Asia Arena	10,000
7 November 2013	Mexico City	Mexico	Mexico City Arena	15,000
9 November 2013	London	England	Wembley Arena	10,000
15 November 2013	Osaka	Japan	Kyocera Dome Osaka	90,000
16 November 2013	Osaka	Japan	Kyocera Dome Osaka	90,000
23 November 2013	Kuala Lumpur	Malaysia	Putra Indoor Stadium	—
30 November 2013	Macau	China	Cotai Arena	—
22 February 2014	Beijing	China	Capital Indoor Stadium	—
Total				450,000

== Personnel ==
- Artists:
  - Super Junior members: Heechul (From Manila but not London & Mexico), Yesung (Seoul Only), Kangin, Shindong, Sungmin, Eunhyuk, Donghae, Siwon, Ryeowook and Kyuhyun
  - Super Junior-M members: Zhou Mi and Henry Lau (Not London and Mexico)
- Tour organizer: SM Entertainment
- Tour promoter: Dream Maker Entercom

== Live album ==
Super Show 5 – Super Junior World Tour Concert Album

Live album by Super Junior
- Released: 6 November 2015
- Recorded: 23–24 March 2013
- Venues: Olympic Gymnastics Arena, Seoul, South Korea
- Genres: K-pop; R&B; Electropop; Synthpop; Dance; Hip hop; Rock; Trot
- Length: 67:05 (Disc 1); 46:00 (Disc 2)
- Languages: Korean; English
- Labels: SM Entertainment, KMP Holdings
- Producer: Lee Soo-man
- Compiler: SM Entertainment

Super Junior chronology
Super Show 4 Concert Album (2013)	Super Show 5 – Super Junior World Tour Concert Album (2015)	Super Show 6 Concert Album (2015)

Super Show 5 – Super Junior World Tour Concert Album is Super Junior's fifth live recorded album, released on 6 November 2015. This album contains two CDs with 31 live recordings from the Super Show 5 concerts held on March 23–24, 2013 at the Olympic Gymnastics Arena located in Seoul, South Korea.

=== Track listing ===
CD 1

1. Intro - Mission: SS5 (3:10)
2. Intro - Ladies & GentlemanIntro (2:08)
3. Mr. Simple (Rearranged) (4:15)
4. 미인아 (Bonamana) (4:38)
5. Super Girl (Korean Ver.) (4:00)
6. 너라고 (It's You) (3:49)
7. Sexy, Free & Single (4:21)
8. 나쁜 여자 (Boom Boom) (2:20)
9. Club No.1 (2:39)
10. So Cold - Eunhyuk, Donghae, Siwon, Henry(SJM) (3:54)
11. 서른즈음에 (Around 30s) - Kangin (4:07)
12. How Am I Supposed To Live Without You - Sungmin, Ryeowook, Kyuhyun, Zhou Mi(SJM) (4:25)
13. 먹지 (Gray Paper) - Yesung (4:38)
14. Break Down (Korean Ver.) (3:29)
15. A-Oh! (Korean Ver.) (3:43)
16. Go (Korean Ver.) (03:26)
17. 생각을 흔들어 (Shake It Up!) (3:03)
18. Rockstar (5:00)

CD 2

1. 머문다 (Daydream) (3:42)
2. 달콤씁쓸 (Bittersweet) (Rearranged) (1:47)
3. 기억을 따라 (Memories) (Rearranged) (4:14)
4. 꿈꾸는 히어로 (Dreaming Hero) (3:22)
5. 꿀단지 (Sunny) (3:12)
6. Wonder Boy (3:17)
7. Marry U (3:20)
8. Sorry, Sorry (4:48)
9. Show Me Your Love (Super Junior Ver.) (4:02)
10. So... I (3:45)
11. So Cold (Studio Ver.) (3:49)
12. A-Oh! (Korean Ver.) (Studio Ver.) (3:40)
13. Go (Korean Ver.) (Studio Ver.) (3:02)

== Media ==
Super Show 5 - Two reality television documentary on the South America leg of the tour. One was narrated by member Kangin, broadcast on cable channel MBC Music from 13 June 2013, for six weeks. The other was narrated by member Kyuhyun, broadcast on cable channel MBC on 8 June 2013.
