= 2014 Top Chinese Music Awards =

Organized by Enlight Media, the 14th Top Chinese Music Awards were held on April 13, 2014 at Shenzhen Bay Sports Center in Shenzhen, Guangdong, China. Theme of this event is “Because of Music•Together”. Famous musician Gao Xiaosong was appointed as the Chairman of the Jury Committee.

== Jury Committee Awards ==
=== Popular Music ===
- Best Male Singer: Wakin Chau "Jiang Hu (江湖)"
- Best Female Singer: 最佳女歌手 Bibi Zhou "Unlock"
- Best Singer-songwriter: Shang Wenjie "Graceland恩赐之地"
- Best New Artist: Wu Mochou
- Best Musical Band and Group: Yu Quan "再生"
- Best Album: Sandee Chan "低调人生"
- Best EP: Vision Wei "登“封”造极"

=== Production ===
- Best Lyrics: Jonathan Lee "Hills (山丘)"
- Best Composition: Jonathan Lee "Hills (山丘)"
- Best Arrangement: Sandee Chan "低调人生"
- Best Album Producer: Shang Wenjie "Graceland恩赐之地"
- Best Song Producer: Jonathan Lee "Hills (山丘)"

=== Folk/Rock/Dance/Electronica ===
- Best Electronica Artist: Sara Chang (张蔷)"别再问我什么是迪斯科"
- Best Dance Music Artist: Vision Wei "登“封”造极"
- Best Rock Artist: Tan Weiwei "Tortoise Called Achilles (乌龟的阿基里斯)"
- Best Folk Artist: Hao Yun (郝云) "活着"

=== Multipurpose ===
- Best Song Written for Visual Media Reno Wang(王铮亮) "时间都去哪了"
- Best Music Video Super Junior-M "Break Down"
- Best Album Planning Yu Quan "再生"

== Popular Votes Awards ==
- Favorite Male Singer of Mainland China: Jason Zhang
- Favorite Female Singer of Mainland China: Bibi Zhou
- Favorite Male Singer of Hong Kong and Taiwan: Jay Chou
- Favorite Female Singer of Hong Kong and Taiwan: G.E.M.
- Favorite New Artist: Oho Ou (欧豪)
- Favorite Artist of Multiple Careers (Singing, Acting, Etc.): Zhang Liang (张亮)
- Favorite Musical Band and Group: Super Junior-M

== Organizing Committee Awards ==
- Presidential Award: Wu Mochou
- Most Influential Figure in Music Industry: Lei Han (韩磊)
- 2013 Producer of the Year: Khalil Fong
- Most Progressive Award: Jason Zhang
- New Force of Music: Jike Junyi (吉克隽逸)
- Oversea Excellent Stage Performance Award: f(x)
