= Spy (Super Junior song) =

- Promotional picture for "Spy"

Single by Super Junior

from the album Spy (Sexy, Free & Single Repackage)
- Language: Korean
- Released: August 5, 2012
- Recorded: 2012
- Studio: SM Blue Ocean (Seoul)
- Genre: Dance-pop
- Length: 3:13
- Label: SM; KMP
- Composers: Thomas Troelsen; Mikkel Remee Sigvardt; Irving Szathmary; Hwang Hyun
- Lyricist: Kenzie

Super Junior singles chronology
"Sexy, Free & Single" (2012)	"Spy" (2012)	"Blue World" (2013)

Music video
- "Spy" on YouTube

"Spy" is a digital single by South Korean boy band Super Junior. It is the second promotional single for the group's sixth studio album Sexy, Free & Single and title track of the repackaged edition, titled Spy. It was digitally released on August 5, 2012, along with three other new tracks in the repackaged album, which was released offline on August 6.

== Background ==
"Spy" is a fast urban dance song that is reminiscent of a spy film. It samples a selection from the 1995 TV series "Get Smart". On 3 August, the teaser for the "Spy" music video was released on their official YouTube channel, and the music video was released on August 12. The group made their "Spy" stage debut on 9 August on Mnet's M! Countdown.

== Track listing ==
1. "Spy" - 3:13

== Credits and personnel ==
Credits adapted from album's liner notes.

Studio

- SM Blue Ocean Studio – recording
- SM Concert Hall Studio – mixing
- Sonic Korea – mastering

Personnel

- SM Entertainment – executive producer
- Lee Soo-man – producer
- Super Junior – vocals
- Kenzie – lyrics
- Thomas Troelsen – composition, arrangement
- Mikkel Remee Sigvardt – composition, arrangement
- Irving Szathmary – composition
- Hwang Hyun – composition, arrangement, vocal directing, recording
- Yoo Han-jin – arrangement
- Jeong Su-wan – guitar
- Lee Seong-ho – recording
- Nam Koong-jin – mixing
- Jeon Hoon – mastering

== Chart ==
Country	Chart	Peak Position	Ref
South Korea	Gaon Weekly Digital Singles Chart	10	
South Korea	Gaon Weekly Online Downloads Chart	8	

== Release history ==
Release history for Spy
Region	Date	Format	Label
Various	August 5, 2012	Digital download; streaming	SM; KMP
