= Break Down (album) =

Studio album by Super Junior-M
- Released: January 7, 2013
- Recorded: 2012
- Studios: In Grid (Seoul); SM Blue Cup (Seoul); SM Blue Ocean (Seoul); SM Concert Hall (Seoul); T (Seoul)
- Genre: Electropop
- Length: 37:57
- Language: Mandarin
- Labels: SM; KMP Holdings
- Producer: Lee Soo-man

Super Junior-M chronology
Perfection (2011)	Break Down (2013)	Swing (2014)

Singles from Break Down
- 1. "Break Down" Released: January 7, 2013

Break Down is the second studio album by Mandopop boy group Super Junior-M. It was released online on January 7, 2013 by S.M. Entertainment and distributed by KMP Holdings. It is their first release in nearly 2 years, since the release of their 2011 EP, Perfection, and their first studio album in nearly 5 years, since the release of their first 2008 studio album, Me.

== Background ==
After their second EP Perfection released in 2011, the Korean members returned to their activities as part of the main group, Super Junior. The main group released their 5th album Mr. Simple in 2011, in which Henry composed a song together with the leader Leeteuk, titled "Andante", for the repackaged version of the album, A-Cha. They also released their 6th album, Sexy, Free & Single, in 2012. Super Junior-M also performed at the main group's world tour Super Show 4. In 2012, Henry and Zhou Mi went on to act in a movie and a drama respectively. Henry was cast in the movie Final Recipe, alongside famous Malaysian actress Michelle Yeoh. Zhou Mi starred in the Chinese-Taiwanese drama When Love Walked In, alongside f(x)'s leader Victoria Song and Fahrenheit's Calvin Chen, as a main cast. In September 2012, it was revealed that Super Junior-M was preparing a comeback with a new album. At that time, the album was in preparation. Since this announcement, Super Junior-M participated in many concerts overseas in the latter half of 2012, including Taiwan, Malaysia and China as destinations. S.M. Entertainment revealed a promotional picture for the new lead single of Super Junior-M, "Break Down", announcing the comeback of the Chinese sub-unit to the Chinese music industry after nearly 2 years. Super Junior-M performed on December 31, 2012 at the 2013 Jiangsu Satellite New Year′s Eve Concert held in Jiangsu, China, and revealed for the first time the teaser for their new lead single "Break Down".

== Composition ==
"We are releasing this new album 2 years after our last album, so we have spent a lot of time on each aspect. We hope to be able to show a different style".

— Zhou Mi, talking about the group's album.

The lead single of the album, "Break Down", is described as an upbeat pop dance song, mixed with elements of dubstep and synth sounds. The song is produced and composed by Australian team Twice As Nice (consisting of Nick Audino & Lewis Hughes), Martin Mulholland and Nermin Harambasic from Dsign Music, while the lyrics are written by Zhou Weijie. It is a song about a man who can no longer hide his love for a woman, expressing his feelings to her. Nick Bass, who has worked with international stars such as Justin Timberlake, Janet Jackson, Beyoncé, Britney Spears, and Christina Aguilera, choreographed the dance for "Break Down". He was also the choreographer behind Super Junior's 2009 hit, "Sorry, Sorry". and also Bonamana in 2010.

For this album, Henry worked as a producer and composer with his production team Noize Bank, and collaborated with member Zhou Mi, who had already written songs for every album of Super Junior-M. Two songs were produced and composed by Noize Bank on this album, "Go" and "It's You", with the lyrics written by Zhou Mi. The track "Go" is described as an impressive song with a cheerful melody. The song expresses the feeling of falling in love, being confident and free about it. "It's You" is an energetic song with bubbly lyrics, a lively melody, and a medium tempo. The song "A-Oh!" is an electronic modern pop song.

Famous Malaysian singer and composer Michael Wong contributed to the album by composing a song for member Zhou Mi, called "Distant Embrace", while the lyrics are written by famous Hong Kong singer and actress Crystal Cheung. Super Junior-M requested a love song from Wong since the release of their first album Me, and sent him their profiles and songs, but he couldn't submit anything to them at that time. At first, he wanted to compose a song similar to the music of Taiwanese band Xiao Hu Dui, but they specifically requested a love song. The lyrics of "Distant Embrace" are about the faint pain of a love. The album contains R&B and ballad songs, including "Good Bye My Love" and "Tunnel". The song "Tunnel" was written by member Zhou Mi, and composed by Kenzie and Andrew Choi. It is a ballad with a dreamy sound.

"Stand Up", an upbeat track, will serve as the OST for upcoming Chinese movie Saving General Yang. Actors from the movie, including Adam Cheng, Vic Zhou, Ekin Cheng, Wu Chun, Li Chen, Raymond Lam, and Fu Xinbo, who play the roles of 7 brothers in the movie, will sing the Korean version of the song, against Super Junior-M who sing the Chinese version.

== Track listing ==
No.	Title	Lyrics	Music	Arrangements	Length
1.	"Break Down"	Zhou Weijie	Twice As Nice, Martin Mulholland, Nermin Harambasic	Twice As Nice	3:22
2.	"Go"	Zhou Mi	Noize Bank (Henry Lau / Gen Neo / Isaac Han / Neil Nallas)	Noize Bank (Henry Lau / Gen Neo)	3:02
3.	"Good Bye My Love" (Chinese: 完美的再见 wán měi de zài jiàn)	Liu Yuan	Park Hae-moon, Park Hae-woon	Park Hae-moon, Park Hae-woon	4:41
4.	"A-oh!"	Tina Wang	Sean Alexander, The Euroz	Team One Sound	3:42
5.	"It’s You"	Zhou Mi, Tina Wang	Noize Bank (Henry Lau / Gen Neo / Isaac Han / Neil Nallas)	Noize Bank	3:01
6.	"Distant Embrace" (Zhou Mi Solo)(Chinese: 距離的擁抱 jù lí de yōng bào)	Crystal Cheung	Michael Wong	Score	5:03
7.	"Tunnel"	Zhou Mi	Kenzie, Andrew Choi	Kenzie	3:43
8.	"Stand Up" (Chinese: 我挺你 wǒ tǐng nǐ)	Tina Wang	Erik Lidbom, Herbie Crichlow	Erik Lidbom, Herbie Crichlow	3:21
9.	"Break Down" (Instrumental)		Twice As Nice, Martin Mulholland, Nermin Harambasic	Twice As Nice	3:21
10.	"Good Bye My Love" (Instrumental)		Park Hae-moon, Park Hae-woon	Park Hae-moon, Park Hae-woon	4:41
Total length:					37:57

Korean Version
No.	Title	Lyrics	Music	Arrangements	Length
1.	"Break Down" (Korean version)	Seo Ji-eum, Lee Seu-ran, Lee Hyo-min	Twice As Nice, Martin Mulholland, Nermin Harambasic	Twice As Nice	3:22
2.	"Good Bye My Love" (Korean: 완미적재견 wan mi jeok jaeg yeon)	Park Shi-yeon, DK4RG, Lee Sang-baek	Park Hae-moon, Park Hae-woon	Park Hae-moon, Park Hae-woon	4:40
3.	"Break Down"	Zhou Weijie	Twice As Nice, Martin Mulholland, Nermin Harambasic	Twice As Nice	3:22
4.	"Go"	Zhou Mi	Noize Bank	Noize Bank	3:02
5.	"Good Bye My Love" (Chinese: 完美的再见 wán měi de zài jiàn)	Liu Yuan	Park Hae-moon, Park Hae-woon	Park Hae-moon, Park Hae-woon	4:41
6.	"A-oh!"	Tina Wang	Sean Alexander, The Euroz	Team One Sound	3:42
7.	"It’s You"	Zhou Mi, Tina Wang	Noize Bank	Noize Bank	3:01
8.	"Distant Embrace" (Zhou Mi Solo)(Chinese: 距離的擁抱 jù lí de yōng bào)	Crystal Cheung	Michael Wong	Score	5:03
9.	"Tunnel"	Zhou Mi	Kenzie, Andrew Choi	Kenzie	3:43
10.	"Stand Up" (Chinese: 我挺你 wǒ tǐng nǐ)	Tina Wang	Erik Lidbom, Herbie Crichlow	Erik Lidbom, Herbie Crichlow	3:21
11.	"Break Down" (Instrumental)		Twice As Nice, Martin Mulholland, Nermin Harambasic	Twice As Nice	3:21
12.	"Good Bye My Love" (Instrumental)		Park Hae-moon, Park Hae-woon	Park Hae-moon, Park Hae-woon	4:41
Total length:					45:59

== Charts ==
=== Album charts ===
Chinese Version

Country	Chart	Peak position	Ref
U.S.	Billboard World Albums	1	
U.S.	Billboard Heatseekers Albums	49	

Korean Version

Country	Chart	Peak position	Ref
South Korea	Gaon Weekly Chart	2	
South Korea	Gaon Monthly Chart	3	

=== Single chart ===
Chinese Version

Country	Chart	Peak position	Ref
Germany	German Asian Music Chart	3	
Taiwan	G-Music Combo Chart	3	
Taiwan	G-Music Mandarin Chart	2	
Thailand	True Music's 'Top 20 Chart'	1	

== Sales ==
Gaon Album Chart

Country	Year	Month	Sales	Accumulative sales	Ref
South; Korea	2013	February	40,696	40,696	
South; Korea	2013	March	8,650	49,346	
South; Korea	2013	April	1,159	50,505	
South; Korea	2013	May	794	51,299	
South; Korea	2013	June	319	51,618	
South; Korea	2013	July	791	52,409	
South; Korea	2014	June	783	2148	
Total	52,409+				

== Listicles ==
Publisher	Year	Listicle	Nominee/work	Placement	Ref.
Billboard	2018	The 100 Greatest Boy Band Songs of All Time: Critics' Picks	"It's You"	44th	

== Release ==
Region	Format	Date	Label	Distributor
Worldwide	Digital download	January 7, 2013	S.M. Entertainment	KMP Holdings
South Korea	Digital download	January 31, 2013	S.M. Entertainment	KMP Holdings
South Korea	CD	February 5, 2013	S.M. Entertainment	KMP Holdings
Taiwan	CD, digital download	February 19, 2013	S.M. Entertainment	Avex Taiwan
Hong Kong	CD, digital download	February 28, 2013	S.M. Entertainment	Avex Asia
Philippines	CD, digital download	June 7, 2013	S.M. Entertainment	Avex Asia, Universal Records
