= Perfection (Super Junior-M EP) =

2011 EP by Super Junior-M

- Standard edition cover

EP by Super Junior-M
- Released: 25 February 2011; 29 April 2011 (repackaged)
- Recorded: December 2010
- Studio: Hub (Seoul); SM Blue Ocean (Seoul); SM Concert Hall (Seoul); SM Yellow Tail (Seoul)
- Genre: Mandopop
- Length: 24:14
- Language: Mandarin
- Label: SM; Avex; Universal
- Producer: Lee Soo-man

Super Junior-M chronology
Super Girl (2009)	Perfection (2011)	Break Down (2013)

Singles from Perfection
- 1. "太完美 (Perfection)" Released: February 25, 2011

Perfection (Chinese: 太完美; pinyin: Tàiwánměi) is the second extended play and third overall release by Mandopop boy band Super Junior-M. It was released in Taiwan on 25 February 2011 by Avex Taiwan, to be followed by other Asian countries in March 2011. This is the group's second EP right after Super Girl in 2009 and their first release not to include Han Geng, but instead include two additional members from the main group, Super Junior: Sungmin and Eunhyuk.

The teaser photos of the group for the EP was released on Avex Taiwan's homepage on 12 February 2011. The lead single and title track, "Perfection" (which was written by the songwriters behind TVXQ's "Mirotic", BoA's "Eat You Up" and f(x)'s "Nu ABO") premiered for airplay on Hit Fm Taiwan on 14 February 2011. The music video teaser was unveiled on 14 February 2011 on SM's YouTube Channel, followed by the music video on 21 February 2011.

The EP was repackaged in April 2011 with a new track and Korean versions of the EP's songs. The Korean version of the title track was included as a bonus track in Super Junior's fifth studio album, "Mr. Simple".

The two main songs Perfection and Destiny have been released in multiple languages. Perfection has been released in Mandarin, Korean, and Japanese while Destiny was released in both Mandarin and Japanese.

The album was one of the best-selling albums of 2011 in Taiwan.

== Track listing ==
No.	Title	Lyrics	Music	Translation	Length
1.	"태완미" (Korean edition and repackaged only)	Lee Won-geun	Mikkel Sigvardt; Thomas Troelsen	Too Perfect (Perfection)	3:27
2.	"太完美 (Perfection)"	Huang Tsu-yin	Sigvardt; Troelsen	Too Perfect (Perfection)	3:27
3.	"命運線 (Mìngyùn Xiàn)"	Liu Yuan	Jin-hwan Kim	Destiny's Line (Destiny)	4:48
4.	"幸福微甜 (Xìngfú Wēi Tián)"	Vincent Fang	Jay Chou	Blissful Sweet (Love is Sweet)	4:34
5.	"表白 (Off My Mind)" (solo performed by Henry)	Henry Lau; Gen Neo	Aalias; Ryghteous Ryan Tedder; Lau; Feleke Ross; DM	Confession (Off My Mind)	3:40
6.	"True Love"	Zhou Mi	Carl Utbult; Fredrik Hult		4:14
7.	"吹一樣的風 (Chuī Yīyàng De Fēng)" (remake of Super Junior's 사랑이 이렇게; Sarangi ireoke)	Zhou Weijie	Squeak Jackson; Stephen Beckham	Blowing Like the Wind (My All is in You)	3:33
8.	"西風的話 (Xīfēng De Huà)" (The folk song of Taiwan, only released in the repackaged version)			The Whisper of West Wind	3:33

== Release date ==
Digital copies were released in Taiwan and South Korea on 25 February 2011. CD copies will be released in Taiwan on 4 March 2011, and in South Korea on 3 March 2011.

=== Japanese version of the album ===
The Japanese version of the EP contains Japanese versions of "Perfection" and "Destiny". It was released August 24, 2011 under Avex Trax in Japan and sold 16,000 units on its first week of release in the country, debuting and peaking at #5 in the Oricon charts. This version of the album has a different cover. It sold approximately 20,000 copies in Japan, charting for four weeks in the Oricon Weekly Albums Chart.

=== Music video for Perfection ===
The Perfection music video was released on separate dates on SM Entertainment's YouTube account, but the Chinese version has been constantly taken down due to minor typing errors in the subtitles of the early videos – the subtitle was displayed in mostly traditional Chinese characters but a few lines also had some Simplified Chinese characters mixed in with the traditional characters. The latest video was put up on February 28, 2011, with all of the Chinese characters in the subtitles fixed into traditional Chinese characters.

The music video features all members of Super Junior-M. However, the video only shows limited appearances of Choi Si-won during most of the video, due to his inability to learn the choreography partly because of a busy acting schedule for Athena: Goddess of War.

== Album sales ==
In Taiwan, "Perfection" has sold over 60,000 copies, making Super Junior M, the bestselling South Korean artist in Taiwan for 2011. The album was heavily promoted in Taiwan during 2011, due to the group's "long stay" of two months in Taiwan to study Mandarin and to accommodate the filming of Skip Beat! for Super Junior M members, Siwon and Donghae. The "long stay" allowed them to frequently appear and promote in Taiwan, which stimulated sales. Additional factors for the album's success in Taiwan included the fact that the pronunciation of title track 太完美 (Tàiwánměi, lit. "too perfect") in Mandarin was similar to that of 臺灣美 (Táiwān měi, lit. "Taiwan is beautiful") and "Taiwanese girl" in Mandarin.

== Chart ==
=== Album charts ===
Korea Version

Country	Chart	Peak position	Ref
South Korea	Gaon Weekly Chart	2	
South Korea	Gaon Monthly Chart	4	
South Korea	Gaon Yearly Chart	38	

== Sales ==
Korean version

Country	Cumulative Sales	Ref
South Korea	37,973+	

Mandarin version

Country	Cumulative Sales	Ref
Taiwan	60,000	

Gaon Monthly Album Chart
Year	Month	Perfection 太完美		Perfection 太完美 (repackaged edition)	
Year	Month	Sales	Cumulative sales	Sales	Cumulative sales
2011	February	16,655	16,655	–	–
2011	March	18,345	35,000	–	–
2011	April	2,973	37,973	18,800	18,800
2011	May	–	–	5,988	24,788
2014	January	–	–	120	120
2014	March	–	–	173	333
Total		63,094+			

== Release history ==
Region	Date	Distributing Label
Taiwan	February 25, 2011	Avex Taiwan
South Korea	February 28, 2011	SM Entertainment
Hong Kong	March 4, 2011	Avex Asia
Mainland China	April 2011	SM Entertainment
Philippines	July 30, 2011	Universal Records
Japan	August 24, 2011	Avex Trax
