= Swing (EP) =

EP by Super Junior-M
- Released: March 21, 2014
- Recorded: 2013–2014
- Studio: Doobdoob (Seoul); In Grid (Seoul); SM Blue Cup (Seoul); SM Blue Ocean (Seoul); SM Yellow Tail (Seoul); Sound Pool (Seoul)
- Genre: Mandopop; R&B; dance; electropop
- Length: 21:30
- Language: Mandarin
- Label: SM; Avex Taiwan; KT Music
- Producer: Lee Soo-man

Super Junior-M chronology
Break Down (2013)	Swing (2014)

Singles from Swing
- 1. "Swing" Released: March 21, 2014

Swing is the third extended play (EP) and fifth overall release by Mandopop boy band Super Junior-M, a sub-group of the South Korean band Super Junior. The EP consists of six songs, which were released for digital download on March 21, 2014, in China and Taiwan by S.M. Entertainment. The group released the album in Korean music sites, such as MelOn, Genie, Naver music and more, on March 31, 2014.

This is the final album to feature Henry as a member before his departure on April 30, 2018.

== Reception ==
The website UnitedKpop gave the album an 8/10 rating, praising its varied music styles and unique lyrical messages. According to the article, the album's title track "Swing" moves away from the "dubsteppy outlook" of their previous album, Breakdown, and instead offers a smoother, R&B-influenced sound. "Swing offers a more smooth, easy-to-listen to R&B sound with headbanging dance tracks with the occasional dubstep slipped in sneakily into it, of course."

Seoulbeats described "Swing" as a "fabulously familiar" track. The review praises the music video's concept of office workers breaking into dance as "plain old awesome" and highlights the choreography as "wild, fast and furious." The author also notes that the video's aesthetic, with its black, white, and yellow color palette, is reminiscent of the group's "Sorry, Sorry" era.

== Track list ==
No.	Title	Lyrics	Music	Length
1.	"Swing" (嘶吼)	Zhou Mi	Daniel Caesar, Ludwig Lindell, Olof Lindskog, Casper	3:42
2.	"Fly High" (飞翔)	Zhou Mi	Sean Alexander, Beau Evans	3:12
3.	"My Love For You" (无所谓)	Gen Neo	NoizeBank	4:16
4.	"Strong" (强势入侵)	长友美知惠 刘源	Hitchhiker	3:11
5.	"Addiction" (入迷)	Tina Wang	Jaakko Salovaara, Tommy Park, Casper, 220	2:51
6.	"After A Minute" (一分后)	黄贞颖 Annakid	Kim Jin Hwan	4:18
Total length:				21:30

Korean version
No.	Title	Lyrics	Music	Length
1.	"Swing" (Korean version)	Kim Jin-ah, Seo Ji-eum	Daniel Caesar, Ludwig Lindell, Olof Lindskog, Casper	3:42
2.	"Fly High" (飞翔)	Zhou Mi	Sean Alexander, Beau Evans	3:12
3.	"My Love For You" (无所谓)	Gen Neo	NoizeBank	4:16
4.	"Strong" (强势入侵)	长友美知惠 刘源	Hitchhiker	3:11
5.	"Addiction" (入迷)	Tina Wang	Jaakko Salovaara, Tommy Park, Casper, 220	2:51
6.	"After A Minute" (一分后)	黄贞颖 Annakid	Kim Jin Hwan	4:18
7.	"Swing" (嘶吼)(Chinese version)	Zhou Mi	Daniel Caesar, Ludwig Lindell, Olof Lindskog, Casper	3:42
Total length:				25:12

== Charts ==
Peak album positions
Chart (2014)	Peak position	Sales
South Korea (Gaon Monthly Albums)	5	46,115

== Release history ==
Region	Date	Format(s)	Label
China	March 21, 2014	Digital download; streaming	SM
Taiwan	March 21, 2014	Digital download; streaming	Avex Taiwan
Hong Kong	March 29, 2014	Digital download; streaming	Media Asia Music
South Korea	March 31, 2014	CD; digital download; streaming	SM; KT Music
