= Skip Beat! (Taiwanese TV series) =

2011 Taiwanese television series

- Promotional poster
- Also known as: Extravagant Challenge; Glamorous Challenge
- Genre: Teen drama
- Based on: Skip Beat! by Yoshiki Nakamura
- Developed by: Doze Niu
- Written by: Yoshiki Nakamura (manga); Tseng Li-ting; Wen Yu-fang; Huang Shin-kao; Peng Sheng-ching; Fang Ching-i; Ouyang Pai-lin
- Directed by: Jerry Feng
- Starring: Ivy Chen; Choi Si-won; Lee Donghae; Allen Chao; Bianca Bai; Charge Pu; King Chin
- Opening theme: "S.O.L.O." by Super Junior-M
- Ending theme: "That's Love" by Donghae with Henry
- Country of origin: Taiwan
- Original language: Mandarin
- No. of episodes: 15

Production
- Executive producers: Doze Niu; Chiu Shan-i; Tsai Jo-chin; Chen Chih-hao; Fang Ko-jen
- Producers: Jerry Feng; Kuo Tzu-chi; Fang Hsiao-jen; Kikuko Miyauchi
- Production locations: Taiwan; Tokyo, Japan
- Running time: 70 minutes
- Production companies: Gala Television; Formosa Television

Original release
- Network: FTV Main Channel; GTV Variety Show
- Release: 18 December 2011 – 1 April 2012

Related
- In Time with You; Absolute Boyfriend

Skip Beat!

Chinese name
- Traditional Chinese: 華麗的挑戰
- Simplified Chinese: 华丽的挑战
- Literal meaning: "challenge of splendor"
Transcriptions
Standard Mandarin
- Hanyu Pinyin: Huálì de Tiǎozhàn
- Wade–Giles: Hua-li te T'iao-chan
Yue: Cantonese
- Yale Romanization: Wa4-lai6 Dik1 Tiu1-jin3
- Jyutping: Waa4-lai6 Dik1 Tiu1-zin3
Southern Min
- Hokkien POJ: Hôa-lē ê Thiau-chiàn

Japanese name
- Kana: スキップ・ビート!
Transcriptions
- Romanization: Sukippu Bīto!

Skip Beat! (Chinese: 華麗的挑戰) is a Taiwanese television series based on the manga of the same name by Yoshiki Nakamura. It premiered on 18 December 2011 on FTV Main Channel and 24 December 2011 on GTV Variety Show. Skip Beat! is a joint production between Taiwan and Japan, and is produced by Gala Television under executive producer Doze Niu.

Development of Skip Beat! began on 1 January 2008 after the casting of Ariel Lin and Jerry Yan in the main roles. On 1 January 2009, Gala Television had to indefinitely postpone the production due to several financial setbacks and script rewrites, causing Yan to drop out of the project.

Skip Beat! was brought back into production following the signing of Super Junior members' Choi Si-won and Lee Donghae in the main roles on 1 May 2010. On 1 February 2011, one month before filming, Ivy Chen replaced Lin, who had already signed to film another production when Skip Beat! was languishing in development hell.

Filming officially began on 1 April 2011 with locations in Taipei and Tokyo. It entered post-production at the conclusion of filming on 1 July 2011.

== Plot ==
High school graduate Gong Xi gives up her chances for university in order to support her childhood friend and romantic goal, Bu Po Shang, in his pop idol career. Upon arriving in Taipei, Gong Xi starts working on multiple jobs in order to support Shang, whose popularity quickly rises, eventually becoming one of the top idols in Taiwan. One day, Gong Xi catches Shang flirting with his manager, and learns that he only used her so she can help him with his living expenses. Heart-broken and betrayed, Gong Xi vows to get revenge by becoming a bigger star. Gong Xi auditions for L.M.E., Taiwan's largest talent agency, and joins L.M.E.'s new-found department "Love Me" with Jiang Nanqin, also a new recruit. At L.M.E. famous actor Dun He Lian, disgusted by Gong Xi's reasons for joining the show business, consistently finds ways to annoy and taunt her. As Gong Xi's acting career starts to take off, she begins to discover a new sense of identity and purpose, separate from her initial plans of revenge. Lian also eventually warms up to her, and although at first in denial, he finds himself falling more and more in love with her.

== Cast ==
Actor	Character	Manga character
Ivy Chen	Gong Xi	Kyoko Mogami
Choi Si-won (voiced by Xie Kun Da [Episodes 1-2] and Nylon Chen [Episodes 3-15])	Dun Helian	Ren Tsuruga
Lee Donghae (voiced by Darren from "The Drifters")	Bu Po Shang / Shang Jieyong	Shō / Shotaro Fuwa
Bianca Bai	Jiang Nan Qin	Kanae Kotonami
Charge Pu	Shen Deyuan	Takenori Sawara
King Chin	Du Jin	Yukihito Yashiro
Ada Pan	Yangyang	Shoko Aki
Allen Chao	Luo Li	Lory Takarada
Frances (Wu Zhao Xian)	Maria	Maria Takarada
Lawrence Ko	Director Aragaki	Seiji Shingai
Lo Bei-an	Director Hei Long	Ushio Kurosaki
Li Yi Jin	Liuli'er	Ruriko Matsunai
Angus Chang	Fei Lihua	Erika Koenji
Cindy Sung	Kuang Meishen	Nanokura Mimori
Jessie Zhang	Xu Yongchun	Haruki Asami
Chang Shao-huai	Director Xu Fang	Director Ogata
Ke Shu-qin	Qing Jie	Hiroko Iizuka
Cherry Hsia	Yi Mei	Momose Itsumi
Willy Tsai	Sapphire	None
Xiao Bing	Emerald	None
Liu Guoshao	Ruby	None
Fu Xiancheng	Lin Ying	None
Wu Min	Shangguan Junzi	Kimiko Kamio
Chen Bozheng	Boss	Taisho (Kyoko's boss at Darumaya)
Ge Lei	Boss's wife	Taisho's wife
Tsai Yi-chen	Wanzi	None
Tang Zhi-wei	Shang Pengtang	Sho Fuwa's father
Yumi Kobayashi	Bu Po Shang's mother	Sho Fuwa's mother
Xie Qiong Nuan	Gong Xi's mother	Saena Mogami (Kyoko's mother)
Frankie Huang	'Bird Rock' program producer	

== Production ==
=== Development and pre-production ===
On 1 January 2008, Gala Television announced their development of Skip Beat! invited producer Kikuko Miyauchi from Japan to produce and Jyu You-ning to direct. On 1 April 2008, Ariel Lin, Jerry Yan and Joe Cheng were cast to portray Gong Xi, Dun Helian and Bu Po Shang respectively. On 1 July 2008, Cheng could not come to an agreement with the script and Cheng dropped out of the project following Cheng's withdrawal, Doze Niu replaced Jyu as director and producer.

On 1 November 2008, Niu Lin, and Yan held a press conference for Skip Beat! in Tokyo announcing that they would begin filming as soon as they find another actor to replace Cheng. Following the press conference, the script had to undergo a rewrite, and the drama's Japanese developers suffered a financial breakdown due to the restructuring of their joint venture company. On 1 January 2009, Lai Congbi, Deputy General Manager of Gala Television announced that filming will be pushed back. Yan who already signed to film a Chinese drama.

On 1 January 2010, Niu wanted to replace Yan with Wu Chun but Gala Television postponed the production indefinitely due to persistent financial problems. On 1 April 2010, Niu and Gala Television brought Skip Beat! back into production with Lin returning to star. On 1 May 2010, it was reported that Super Junior members Siwon and Donghae were cast to portray Dun Helian and Bu Po Shang respectively.

On 1 February 2011, Ivy Chen was cast to replace Lin, who withdrew from the project because she was already booked to film In Time with You when Skip Beat! was to begin filming. On 31 March 2011, a press conference was held for Skip Beat! in Chinese Taipei attended by over 100 reporters and fans. Niu announced that Jerry Feng will take his place to direct. Niu praised the drama's "too brilliant" script and that he "didn't want to leave it behind." On an estimated budget of over 80 million TWD (US$2.6 million) until each episode cost about 4 million TWD (US$132,000) to produce.

=== Filming and promotion ===
Filming commenced on 1 April 2011 in Republic of China and took 4-months to complete. The main cast filmed promotional photoshoots for the drama on 28 July 2011 and attended a wrap-up banquet hosted by the production crew afterwards. Post-production officially began on 29 July 2011. Because Siwon and Donghae filmed most of their scenes speaking in Korean instead of Chinese ex-Energy member Kunda and Darren from The Drifters are hired to dub their voices into Mandarin respectively. Nylon Chen was later hired to replace Kunda.

Gala Television spent 20 million WD (US$659,000) marketing the drama. Skip Beat! was first promoted at the 17th Shanghai Television Festival, in which a three-minute sales presentation trailer was aired to attract potential Chinese distributors. A distributor bought the copyrights for 191,000 yuan (US$30,000) and online distributors bought the rights for 63,800 yuan (US$10,000) becoming the most expensive Taiwanese drama to broadcast in Mainland China.

On 1 August 2011, it was reported that foreign distribution rights totaled 3.7 million TWD (US$120,000) per episode. The drama held its world premiere on 14 December 2011 in the LUX Cineplex Theater in Ximending, Taipei.

Viral marketing was one of the marketing campaigns employed for the drama. On 1 December 2011, the drama's official website revealed a poll of four different promotional posters for the drama, and had fans choose an official poster. 30 randomly selected voters were given a free poster, one was given a signed poster, and another was given a Bu Po Shang pillow. In addition to the poster voting campaign, a giveaway of many of the drama's official products will be given to those who could locate taxis painted with the drama's official art in Taipei.

== Music ==
Super Junior-M performed the opening theme "S.O.L.O." (Chinese title: 華麗的獨秀; lit. "Glamorous Solo Show") written by Tim McEwan, Lars Halvor Jensen, and Reed Vertelney, with lyrics penned by Zhou Weijie, who also helped write in Super Junior-M's EP Perfection. Donghae and Chance wrote the ending theme "That's Love" (Chinese title: 這是愛; lit. "This is Love"), with lyrics penned by Huang Tsu-yin. Donghae and Super Junior-M member Henry performed the ending. It is also reported that A-Lin and Super Junior-M member Zhou Mi also recorded solo songs in the drama's official soundtrack, which will be distributed by Avex Taiwan. The soundtrack debuted in 1st place on Taiwan's 5 Music's Chinese charts and in 5th place on Taiwan's G-Music Chinese charts.

== Broadcast ==
Formosa Television bought the rights to premiere the drama on its television channel on 18 December 2011. The cable GTV network aired the first episode on 24 December 2011. Singapore's cable operator StarHub TV bought the rights to premiere the drama on E City. In Hong Kong, TVB premiered the Cantonese-dubbed version on 25 December 2011. TVB previously aired the anime version of Skip Beat!.

== Reception ==
The first episode of Skip Beat! received mixed reviews. Gala Television received complaints concerning Dun Helian's voice actor Kunda, whose boyish voice is unfit for Dun Helian's deep, steady tone and proud demeanor. As a result, Nylon Chen was hired to replace Kunda.

=== Ratings ===
Formosa Television (民視) Ratings
Episode	Original Broadcast Date	Average	Rank	Remarks
1	18 December 2011	1.35	#2	
2	25 December 2011	1.17	#2	
3	1 January 2012	0.97	#2	
4	8 January 2012	1.18	#2	
5	15 January 2012	1.44	#2	
6	29 January 2012	1.32	#2	
7	5 February 2012	1.46	#2	
8	12 February 2012	1.19	#2	
9	19 February 2012	1.39	#2	
10	26 February 2012	1.82	#2	
11	4 March 2012	1.75	#2	
12	11 March 2012	1.85	#2	
13	18 March 2012	1.72	#2	
14	25 March 2012	1.50	#2	
15	1 April 2012	1.85	#2	

== Notes ==
- a. See Broadcast.
