= Sexy, Free & Single (song) =

- Japanese CD+DVD cover

Single by Super Junior

from the album Sexy, Free & Single
- Language: Korean; Japanese
- Released: July 1, 2012 (Korean); August 22, 2012 (Japanese)
- Recorded: 2012
- Studio: SM Booming System (Seoul)
- Genre: Eurohouse
- Length: 3:44
- Label: SM; KMP; Avex Trax
- Composers: Daniel "Obi" Klein; Thomas Sardorf; Lasse Lindorff
- Lyricists: Yoo Young-jin (Korean); Leonn (Japanese)
- Producer: Daniel "Obi" Klein

Super Junior singles chronology
"Opera" (2012)	"Sexy, Free & Single" (2012)	"Spy" (2012)

Music video
- "Sexy, Free & Single" on YouTube

"Sexy, Free & Single" is a song recorded in two languages (Korean and Japanese) by South Korean boy band Super Junior. The original Korean version was released as the group's thirteenth Korean single from their sixth studio album, Sexy, Free & Single on July 1, 2012 through SM Entertainment via digital download and streaming. The Japanese version was released through Avex Trax on August 22, 2012 as the group's fourth official Japanese single, and was distributed in two physical formats.

== Background and release ==
=== Korean version ===
The title track "Sexy, Free & Single", describes the sexy and free life of a single man in a soulful Eurohouse genre with an easy and infectious chorus. It is composed and arranged by Danish songwriters Daniel 'Obi' Klein, Thomas Sardorf and Lasse Lindorff, with the Korean version written by Yoo Young-jin and the Japanese version written by Leonn. The song was composed in the key of C# major, with a tempo of 115 beats per minute.

The group reportedly filmed a music video in Namyangju, Gyeonggi Province, with a Devin Jamieson choreographed dance for title track, "Sexy, Free & Single", who had worked with artists such as BoA, Michael Jackson, Britney Spears and Hilary Duff. In addition, their performance also benefit from the support provided by other choreographers such as Lyle Beniga, Nick Baga and Devon Perri.

On June 29, the teaser for the MV was released on their official YouTube channel, this was followed by the full music video on July 3.

=== Japanese version ===
On June 29, during the press conference at the Mnet 20's Choice Awards members of the group confirmed that they had recorded a Japanese version of title track, "Sexy, Free & Single", and an original Japanese MV, as well as other tracks. They did not announce plans for any promotional activities in Japan. On July 17, SM Entertainment announced that the track would be released on August 22, 2012, as their fourth Japanese single. On August 22, Super Junior officially released their fourth Japanese single "Sexy, Free & Single". After the first day of sales, the single placed second on the Oricon Daily Chart, selling 63,813 units. The following day, the Japanese version of "Sexy, Free & Single" placed second on the Oricon Weekly Chart by selling 109,821 units and later placed sixth on the Oricon Monthly Chart by selling 118,902 units. The song was certified gold in Japan for selling over 100.000 copies.

== Accolades ==
Awards for "Sexy, Free & Single"
Year	Organization	Award	Result	Ref.
2012	Mnet Asian Music Awards	Song of the Year	Nominated	
2012	Mnet Asian Music Awards	Best Dance Performance – Male	Nominated	
2013	Myx Music Awards	Favorite K-Pop Video	Won	

Music program wins
Program	Date
Show Champion	July 10, 2012
Show Champion	July 17, 2012
Show Champion	July 24, 2012
M Countdown	July 11, 2012
M Countdown	July 19, 2012
M Countdown	July 26, 2012
Music Bank	July 20, 2012
Music Bank	July 27, 2012

== Track listing ==
Digital download – Korean version

1. "Sexy, Free & Single" – 3:44

CD single / CD+DVD – Japanese version

1. "Sexy, Free & Single" – 3:48
2. "Our Love" – 6:11
3. "Sexy, Free & Single" (Korean version) (CD-only version) – 3:49

DVD track listing

1. Sexy, Free & Single - Music Video -
2. Sexy, Free & Single - Music Video - [Korean ver.]
3. Making Clip
4. Way - SUPER SHOW4 in TOKYO ver. -[Memorial Clip] (limited edition CD+DVD only)

== Chart performance ==
=== Korean version ===
Country	Chart	Peak position
South Korea	Gaon Digital Chart (overall)	5
South Korea	Gaon Digital Chart (download)	4

=== Japanese version ===
Oricon Chart	Peak	Debut Sales	Sales Total	Ref
Daily Albums Chart	1	63,813	123,140+	
Weekly Albums Chart	2	109,821	123,140+	
Monthly Albums Chart	6	118,902	123,140+	
Yearly Albums Chart	59	123,140	123,140+	

== Sales and certifications ==
Chart	Amount
Oricon physical sales	123,140+
RIAJ certification	Gold

== Credits and personnel ==
Credits adapted from album's liner notes.

Studio

- SM Booming System – recording, mixing
- Sonic Korea – mastering

Personnel

- SM Entertainment – executive producer
- Lee Soo-man – producer
- Kim Young-min – executive supervisor
- Super Junior – vocals, background vocals
- Leonn – Japanese lyrics
- Yoo Young-jin – Korean lyrics, vocal directing, background vocals, recording, mixing
- Daniel "Obi" Klein – producer, composition, arrangement
- Thomas Sardorf – composition, arrangement
- Lasse Lindorff – composition, arrangement
- Jeon Hoon – mastering

== Release history ==
Release history for "Sexy, Free & Single'"
Region	Date	Version	Format	Label	Ref
South Korea	July 1, 2012	Korean	Digital download; streaming	SM	—
Various	July 1, 2012	Korean	Digital download; streaming	SM	—
Japan	August 22, 2012	Japanese	CD; DVD	Avex Trax	
Various	August 22, 2012	Japanese	Digital download; streaming	Avex Trax	
