= Sexy, Free & Single =

- Digital and A version cover.

Studio album by Super Junior
- Released: July 4, 2012
- Recorded: May – June 2012
- Studio: Doobdoob (Seoul); In Grid (Seoul); SM Blue Cup (Seoul); SM Blue Ocean (Seoul); SM Concert Hall (Seoul); SM Booming System (Seoul); T (Seoul)
- Genre: K-pop; R&B; electro-pop; dance; hip-hop; Eurohouse
- Length: 35:38; 49:31 (Spy repackage)
- Language: Korean
- Label: SM; KMP
- Producer: Lee Soo-man

Super Junior chronology
Mr. Simple (2011)	Sexy, Free & Single (2012)	Hero (2013)

Singles from Sexy, Free & Single
- 1. "Sexy, Free & Single" Released: July 4, 2012

Repackaged edition cover

Singles from Spy
- 1. "Spy" Released: August 7, 2012

Sexy, Free & Single (reissue name Spy) is the sixth Korean studio album of South Korean boy band Super Junior. It was released on July 4, 2012, by SM Entertainment, distributed by KMP Holdings and available from online music portal sites at midnight on July 1, 2012. It is their first album in 11 months following Mr. Simple released in August 2011. This was followed by the release of Version B on July 16, with a different cover which features the 10 members in their teaser photo makeup. A repackaged edition, re-titled Spy was released on August 6, with four new tracks including follow-up single "Spy".

This album marks the return of member Kangin, who was discharged from his mandatory military service in April 2012, and the first time with Super Junior in three years since October 2009; but the first one without Heechul, who enlisted in September 2011, and the last with leader Leeteuk and Yesung before their military service, enlisting on October 30, 2012, and on May 6, 2013, respectively. This is the third album that features ten of the 13 members from the group, following Bonamana in 2010 and their fifth album Mr. Simple.

The album won Album of the Year at the 14th Mnet Asian Music Awards and Disc Daesang at the 27th Golden Disc Awards. According to the Gaon Album Chart, as of the end of December 2012, the album has sold a cumulative total of 510,000 copies domestically.

== Background ==
On June 21, 2012, the first teaser photo, showing the theme of 'Beautiful men' was released, showing Eunhyuk in a white shirt, blue jeans, styled with a mullet-like hairstyle and blindfolded with white and pink flowers. This was followed by Donghae's teaser photo on June 22, with him dressed in a black mesh shirt with a white lace veil over his head. On June 23, the teaser photos of Leeteuk, with platinum silver hair, a gold necklace and heavy black eye makeup; and Ryeowook with red hair and feathers, were released. The following day on June 24, Yesung's and Shindong's photos were released, in which Yesung is partially bare chested with a crown of branches on his head and Shindong is frozen with light blue highlights in his hair. The teasers continued on June 25, with the release of Kangin and Sungmin's photos, showing a slim downed Kangin with a frosty look and a net-like veil over his head; and a side-profiled Sungmin with a feminized look and long blonde hair holding a large bouquet of baby’s breath flowers. On the same day Leeteuk also tweeted another version of his teaser photo with the same outfit but in a different pose leaning on his hand looking as he was in a deep contemplation. The final teasers displaying Siwon and Kyuhyun were released on June 26, showing Siwon with long blonde hair under a dip-dyed hat that matches his green eyebrows; and lastly Kyuhyun in a side profile looking upwards with a pale white gold face.

== Music and video ==
Leeteuk expressed that they had wanted to try out different music and dance styles in this album, as the songs from their third to fifth albums have been similar. Sungmin further explained saying, "The songs on our previous albums mostly featured mechanical sounds effects and catchy rhythms, but this time we tried to diversify into various genres such as ballads, R&B, and covers of old songs, without relying on special audio effects as much".

The title track "Sexy, Free & Single" describes the sexy and free life of a single man in a soulful Eurohouse genre with an easy and infectious chorus. It is composed and arranged by Danish songwriters Daniel 'Obi' Klein, Thomas Sardorf and Lasse Lindorff. The second lead track is "From U", a med-tempo R&B track dedicated to their fans. It talks about their gratitude towards them and their bickering yet loving relationship. The third track "Now" is about taking a break away from everyday life and going to the beach and "Rockstar" is a club and electronic mixed track with hip hop. "Gulliver" is written by Eunhyuk and features rap by him, Leeteuk, Donghae and Shindong, with vocals by Ryeowook. The track "Someday" is a cover version of a Lee Sang-eun song, while "Bittersweet" is sung by Kyuhyun, Yesung, Sungmin and Ryeowook. On June 30, SM Entertainment released a minute-and-a-half highlight medley of tracks from the album on YouTube featuring previously unreleased teaser photos.

The group reportedly filmed a music video in Namyangju, Gyeonggi Province, with a Devin Jamieson-choreographed dance for "Sexy, Free & Single". Jamieson had previously worked with artists such as BoA, Michael Jackson, Britney Spears and Hilary Duff. In addition, their performance also benefited from the support provided by other choreographers such as Lyle Beniga, Nick Baga and Devon Perri.

On June 29, the teaser for the MV was released on their official YouTube channel, which was followed by the full music video on July 3. Sexy, Free & Single MV achieved 1 000 000 views in only 12 hours.

== Repackaged album ==
The repackaged edition, re-titled Spy, includes four new tracks with follow-up single "Spy", an urban dance track. "Only U" was composed by Leeteuk and Lee Jae-myoung (who previously wrote for the group's tracks "Marry U" and "Happy Together") with the lyrics by Leeteuk and Donghae. "Haru" was co-written by Donghae and Urban Zakapa's Kwon Sun-il while "Outsider" is a hip hop dance track. The MV teaser for "Spy" was released on August 3, followed by the full MV on August 13, 2012. The repackaged edition ranked number one on the Gaon Weekly Album Chart in its first week of release, remaining in the top three for five weeks, and ranking number one on the Gaon Monthly Album Chart of August.

== Promotion and reception ==
A press conference, attended by the 10 active members, was held on July 3 to launch the album. It attracted media and international reporters from Taiwan, China, Japan and Kazakhstan. It also marks Kangin's first official activity since being discharged. They made their official comeback on Mnet's M! Countdown on July 5, performing "Sexy, Free & Single" and "From U". This marks the on-stage reunion with Kangin and his first performance in two years. Further proving their global popularity, Super Junior’s press conference for their sixth album was recently covered by a popular Polish news station.

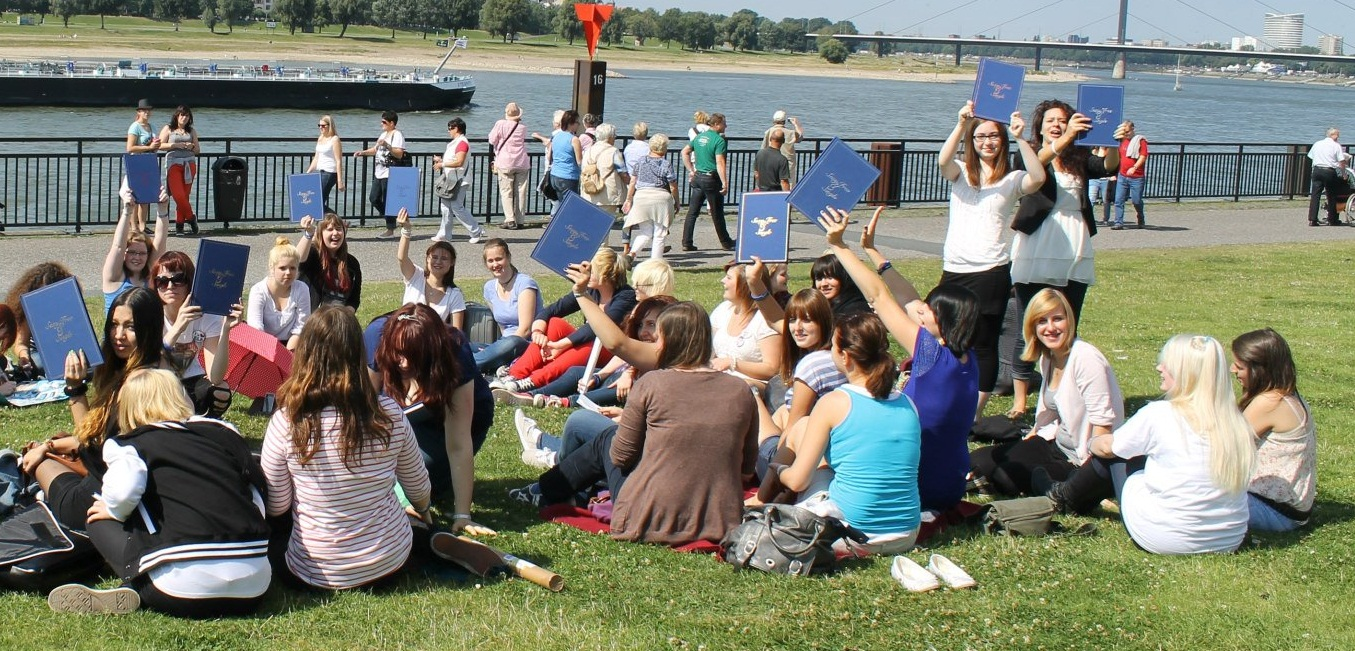
Fans holding the copies of the album in Düsseldorf.

The album peaked at number three on the Billboard World Albums chart. According to Hanteo, Super Junior became the first artist in 2012 to surpass 200,000 copies sold with Sexy, Free & Single. Sexy, Free & Single managed to sell 335,744 copies in one month according to Gaon, reaching 1st place on all albums charts. Super Junior ranked 1st place on Hanteo's "Top 5 K-Pop Artists" 2012, winning the Hanteo Singer Award, and also won the 2012 Hanteo Album Award. The Japanese version of the "Sexy, Free & Single" single, which was released on August 22, sold over 118,902 units and was certified Gold for selling over 100,000 units. The album won Album of the Year at the 14th Mnet Asian Music Awards and Disc Daesang at the 27th Golden Disc Awards.

== Accolades ==
Awards and nominations for Sexy Free & Single
Year	Award-giving Body	Category	Result	Ref
2012	Hanteo Awards	Album Award	Won	
2012	Hong Kong Top Sales Music Awards	Best Japanese & Korean Releases	Won	
2012	Mnet Asian Music Awards	Album of the Year	Won	
2012	Philippine K-pop Awards	Album of the Year	Won	
2012	Tower Records K-pop Lovers Awards	Album of the Year	Won	
2013	Gaon Chart K-Pop Awards	Album of the Year – 3rd Quarter	Won	
2013	Golden Disc Awards	Album Daesang	Won	
2013	Golden Disc Awards	Album Bonsang	Won	

== Track listing ==
Sexy, Free & Single Version A and B track listing
No.	Title	Lyrics	Music	Arrangement	Length
1.	"Sexy, Free & Single"	Yoo Young-jin	Daniel "Obi" Klein; Thomas Sardorf; Lasse Lindorff	Daniel "Obi" Klein; Thomas Sardorf; Lasse Lindorff	3:44
2.	"From U" (너로부터; Neorobuteo)	Yoo Young-jin	Yoo Young-jin; Yoo Han-jin	Yoo Young-jin; Yoo Han-jin	3:11
3.	"Gulliver" (걸리버)	Eunhyuk	Markus Bøgelund; Søren Holmager; Mick Rasmussen	Markus Bøgelund; Søren Holmager; Mick Rasmussen	3:25
4.	"Someday" (언젠가는; Eonjenganeun)	Lee Tzsche	Lee Tzsche; Ahn Jin-woo	Park Chang-hyun; Jung Min-ji	4:13
5.	"Now" (나우)	Kim Boo-min	Hitchhiker	Hitchhiker	3:53
6.	"Rockstar"	Peter Hyun (D2O); Young Sky (D2O)	D2O	D2O	3:11
7.	"Bittersweet" (달콤씁쓸; Dalkomsseupsseul)	Kim Jeong-bae	Kenzie	Kenzie; Nile Lee	3:26
8.	"Butterfly" (빠삐용; Ppappiyong^{[a]})	Hwang Hyun (MonoTree); Agnes Shin (MonoTree); Eunhyuk	Hwang Hyun (MonoTree)	MonoTree	3:08
9.	"Daydream" (머문다; Meomunda; lit. 'Stay')	Ha Jung-ho; Storyteller	Ha Jung-ho; Storyteller	Ha Jung-ho; Storyteller	3:44
10.	"A 'Good'bye" (헤어지는 날; He-eojineun Nal; lit. 'Parting day')	Park Chang-hyun	Park Chang-hyun	Park Chang-hyun; Park In-young	3:48
Total length:					35:38

SPY Repackage track listing
No.	Title	Lyrics	Music	Arrangement	Length
1.	"Sexy, Free & Single"	Yoo Young-jin	Daniel "Obi" Klein; Thomas Sardorf; Lasse Lindorff	Daniel "Obi" Klein; Thomas Sardorf; Lasse Lindorff	3:44
2.	"Spy"	Kenzie	Thomas Troelsen; Mikkel Remee Sigvardt; Irving Szathmary; Hwang Hyun (MonoTree)	Thomas Troelsen; Mikkel Remee Sigvardt; Hwang Hyun (MonoTree); Yoo Han-jin	3:13
3.	"From U" (너로부터; Neorobuteo)	Yoo Young-jin	Yoo Young-jin; Yoo Han-jin	Yoo Young-jin; Yoo Han-jin	3:11
4.	"Outsider"	Kenzie; Eunhyuk	Herbert St. Clair Crichlow; Adam Pallin; Thomas Troelsen	Kenzie	3:05
5.	"Only U"	Leeteuk; Super Junior-D&E	Leeteuk; LeeOn	LeeOn; Nile Lee	3:35
6.	"Haru" (하루)	Super Junior-D&E; Shindong; Kwon Sun-il	Donghae; Kwon Sun-il	D2O; Nile Lee	3:28
7.	"Now" (나우)	Kim Boo-min	Hitchhiker	Hitchhiker	3:53
8.	"Rockstar"	Peter Hyun (D2O); Young Sky (D2O)	D2O	D2O	3:11
9.	"Gulliver" (걸리버)	Eunhyuk	Markus Bøgelund; Søren Holmager; Mick Rasmussen	Markus Bøgelund; Søren Holmager; Mick Rasmussen	3:25
10.	"Someday" (언젠가는; Eonjenganeun)	Lee Tzsche	Lee Tzsche; Ahn Jin-woo	Park Chang-hyun; Jung Min-ji	4:13
11.	"Bittersweet" (달콤씁쓸; Dalkomsseupsseul)	Kim Jeong-bae	Kenzie	Kenzie; Nile Lee	3:26
12.	"Butterfly" (빠삐용; Ppappiyong^{[a]})	Hwang Hyun (MonoTree); Agnes Shin (MonoTree); Eunhyuk	Hwang Hyun (MonoTree)	MonoTree	3:08
13.	"Daydream" (머문다; Meomunda; lit. 'Stay')	Ha Jung-ho; Storyteller	Ha Jung-ho; Storyteller	Ha Jung-ho; Storyteller	3:44
14.	"A 'Good'bye" (헤어지는 날; He-eojineun Nal; lit. 'Parting day')	Park Chang-hyun	Park Chang-hyun	Park Chang-hyun; Park In-young	3:48
Total length:					49:31

Notes ^{^[a]} – Hangulization of French: Papillon, lit. 'Butterfly'

== Charts ==
=== Album charts ===
Sexy, Free & Single chart performance
Chart (2012)	Peak position
Japanese Weekly Albums (Oricon)	5
Japanese Monthly Albums (Oricon)	9
South Korean Weekly Albums (Gaon)	1
South Korean Yearly Albums (Gaon)	1
Taiwan Combo Albums (G-Music)	4
Taiwan J-pop Albums (G-Music)	1
US World Albums (Billboard)	3
US Heatseekers Albums (Billboard)	37

Spy chart performance
Chart (2012)	Peak position
South Korean Weekly Albums (Gaon)	1
South Korean Monthly Albums (Gaon)	1

=== Charted songs ===
Title	Peak positions		Digital sales
Title	KOR	KOR Hot	Digital sales
"Sexy, Free & Single"	5	17	KOR: 873,000
"Spy"	10	20	KOR: 440,000
"From U"	51	—	KOR: 141,000
"Bittersweet"	65	—	KOR: 86,000
"Someday"	68	—	KOR: 84,000
"A 'Good'bye"	71	—	KOR: 82,000
"Now"	72	—	KOR: 78,000
"Daydream"	76	—	KOR: 72,000
"Rockstar"	77	—	KOR: 71,000
"Gulliver"	82	—	KOR: 63,000
"Butterfly"	83	—	KOR: 63,000
"Only U"	86	—	KOR: 35,000
"Haru"	93	—	KOR: 31,000

== Sales ==
Region	Sales (2012)
Japan (Oricon) – Sexy, Free & Single	40,752
Japan (Oricon) – Spy	19,748
South Korea (Gaon) – Sexy, Free & Single	362,991
South Korea (Gaon) – Spy	132,876

== Personnel ==
As listed in the liner notes:

- Super Junior – vocals, background vocals
- Lee Soo-man – producer
- SM Entertainment – executive producer
- Yoo Young-jin – recording, mixing, background vocals (on "Sexy, Free & Single" and "From U"), director (on "Sexy, Free & Single" and "From U")
- Nam Gung-jin – recording, mixing
- Lee Seong-ho – recording
- Gu Jong-pil – recording, mixing
- Jeong Eui-seok – recording, mixing
- Jeong Eun-kyung – recording
- Oh Seung-geun – recording
- Kim Heon-gon – recording
- Jeon Hun - mastering
- Park Seong-in – stylist
- Yuna – make-up artist
- Park Nae-ju – make-up artist
- Choi Dae-kyun – hair stylist
- Hyeon Yun-soo – hair stylist
- Min Hee-jin – design
- Han Jong-cheol – photography
- Kim Young-min – executive supervisor

"Now"

- hitchhiker – director, guitar, bass guitar

"Rockstar"

- D20 (detour) Peter & Young Sky – director
- Jeong Su-wan – guitar

"Gulliver"

- hitchhiker – director, guitar, keyboard

"Someday"

- Park Chang-hyun – director
- Kang Su-ho – drums
- Choi Hoon – bass guitar
- Go Tae-young – guitar
- Jung – string
- Jeong Min-ji – string arrangement and conducting
- Jason Lee – brass, saxophone
- Jo Jung-hyun – brass
- Park Kyung-geon – brass

"Bittersweet"

- Kenzie – director, piano
- Choi Hoon – bass guitar
- Kim Jung-bae – guitar
- Jung – string
- Lee Na-il – string arrangement and conducting

"Butterfly"

- Hwang Hyun – director
- Jeong Su-wan – guitar

"Daydream"

- Ha Seong-ho – director
- Lee Su-jun – guitar
- Storyteller – keyboard
- Gil Sang-jun – background vocals

"A 'Good'bye"

- Park Chang-hyun – director
- Go Tae-young – guitar
- Jung – string
- Park In-young – string arrangement and conducting

== Release history ==
Country	Date	Format	Distributing label
South Korea	July 1, 2012; July 4, 2012 (Version A); July 16, 2012 (Version B); August 8, 2012 (Repackage Edition)	Digital download CD; CD; Digital download, CD	KMP Holdings
Taiwan	July 3, 2012; August 3, 2012 (Version A)	Digital download CD	Avex Taiwan
Japan	July 6, 2012 (imports)	CD	Avex Trax
Philippines	December 1, 2012	CD	Universal Records
