= Super Girl (Super Junior song) =

Single by Super Junior-M

from the EP Super Girl
- Language: Mandarin; Korean
- Released: 14 September 2009
- Recorded: 2009
- Studio: SM Booming System (Seoul)
- Genre: Electropop
- Length: 3:40
- Label: SM
- Composer: Yoo Young-jin
- Lyricists: Aibi (Chinese); Yoo Young-jin (Korean)
- Producer: Yoo Young-jin

Super Junior-M singles chronology
"Me" (2008)	"Super Girl" (2009)	"Blue Tomorrow" (2009)

Music video
- "Super Girl" (Korean ver.) on YouTube
- "Super Girl" (Chinese ver.) on YouTube

"Super Girl" is a song by Mandopop boy band Super Junior-M from their mini album, Super Girl. Written and produced by Yoo Young-jin, the single served as the mini album's first promotional single. The song was released on 14 September 2009, along with the release of its corresponding music video. It is one of Super Junior-M's critically successful singles, winning accolades at various Chinese music festivals.

The track "Super Girl" is listed at number 29 on Hit Fm Taiwan's Hit Fm Annual Top 100 Singles Chart for 2009.

== Music and lyrics ==
Written and produced by Yoo Young-jin, "Super Girl" was recorded in SM Booming System in Seoul, South Korea. The song has a quick electro-synth groove, with quick synthesizers and a techno melody. The composition of "Super Girl" carries a similar sultry beat as some of Yoo's previous works, such as Super Junior's "Sorry, Sorry" and later, Shinee's "Ring Ding Dong".

Quite the opposite of "Sorry, Sorry" lyrically, "Super Girl" deals with letting go of a blind relationship. The lyrics is in a point of view of a man, who wants to have "super girl" forget about those who have hurt her. He wants her to be aware of her own positive qualities, and that he will always cherish her as his super girl. In the second half of the song, the lyrics portray the other man pursuing super girl again, and the lyrics tell her that she should avoid him and not trust him, only to be hurt all over again.

== Music video ==
The music video for "Super Girl" was directed by Cho Soo-Hyun and filmed in a studio in Yangsu-ri, Gyeonggi-do, South Korea in August 2009. On 11 September, a 32-second teaser video of it was released throughout Asia, and the full version was released on 14 September on Super Junior's official YouTube channel, China's Sohu news portal, Taiwan's Avex Taiwan homepage and Thailand's GMM website.

The music video, including intercut sequences of choreographed dancing by Super Junior-M, tells a story of a nerd (played by Han Geng) who accidentally crashes into a house party. Warmly welcomed by the DJ and others, Han Geng begins taking random pictures of the people in the party with his cell phone. He comes upon a beautiful girl (Jessica Jung of Girls' Generation), and begins taking photos of her. Annoyed, Jessica pushes him away with a disgusted look. Rejected and hurt, Han Geng walks out of the party. Wanting to catch Jessica's attention one more time, he magically dresses into a suitable party boy attire and confidently walks back into the party, surprising Jessica with his cool appearance, and lures her into dancing with him.

== Credits ==
Credits adapted from album's liner notes.

Studio

- SM Booming System – recording, mixing
- Sonic Korea – mastering

Personnel

- SM Entertainment – executive producer
- Lee Soo-man – producer
- Super Junior-M – vocals
- Yoo Young-jin – producer, Korean lyrics, composition, arrangement, vocal directing, background vocals, recording, mixing
- Aibi – Chinese lyrics
- Jeon Hoon – mastering
