= Super Junior-M =

Subgroup of the South Korean boy band Super Junior

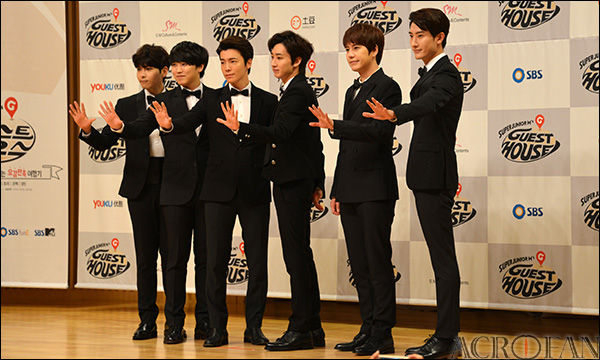
- Left to right: Ryeowook, Sungmin, Donghae, Eunhyuk, Kyuhyun, Zhou Mi. Not pictured: Siwon.

Background information
- Also known as: SJ-M
- Genres: Mandopop; dance; R&B; electronic
- Years active: 2008–2009; 2011–2015
- Labels: SM; Label SJ; Avex Taiwan
- Spinoff of: Super Junior
- Members: Sungmin; Eunhyuk; Siwon; Zhou Mi; Donghae; Ryeowook; Kyuhyun
- Past members: Han Geng; Henry
- Website: Official website

Super Junior-M (an initialism for Super Junior-Mandarin, also known as SJ-M), is the third sub-unit of the South Korean boy band Super Junior focusing on Chinese market, currently composed of six Super Junior members Sungmin, Eunhyuk, Siwon, Donghae, Ryeowook, Kyuhyun and special member Zhou Mi. The sub-unit is known as the first international music group in the Chinese music industry to have members of both Chinese and Korean descent. The sub-unit has released two studio albums and three EP's since their debut.

Formed in 2008, Super Junior-M became the third and most successful subgroup branched off from the Korean band Super Junior. The group was originally composed of seven members: leader Han Geng, Donghae, Siwon, Ryeowook, Kyuhyun and two additional members appearing exclusively to the subgroup, Zhou Mi and Henry. In December 2009, Han Geng filed a lawsuit against SM Entertainment and decided to leave the main group and sub-group, resulting in the sub-group's temporary disbandment.

After a year-long hiatus, the group returned with additional Super Junior members Eunhyuk and Sungmin, followed with the release of their second EP Perfection in February 2011. Following Han Geng's departure, Sungmin was speculated to be the new "leader", as he is the oldest member of the team.

Following Sungmin's military service enlistment in 2015, the sub-unit performed as a 7-member with a song titled "Forever with You" in the special album Devil. In April 2018, special member Henry left the sub-unit following his contract expiration with SM.

== Name ==
Before the official name of the subgroup was released, they were known by "Super Junior China". On April 3, 2008, SM Entertainment announced their official name to be Super Junior-M, with "M" representing the word "Mandarin". The "M" can also represent a list of other aspects, such as the first letter of their debut album Me, and also "mí" (Chinese: 迷), the pinyin for "charismatic" and "fan", the latter meaning referring to their desire to connect closer with fans.

== History ==
=== 2007: Formation and controversies ===
In October 2007, SM Entertainment announced that a new Super Junior subgroup would debut in China in 2008. Super Junior's original member Han Geng, and a new member Henry Lau, who performed the violin solo of Super Junior's "Don't Don", were announced to be the first two of seven members representing the subgroup. Some of Super Junior's official fanclub, E.L.F, signed online petitions and held protests to express their dissatisfaction and opposition of adding a fourteenth member to the group, fearing that a new member would mean one of the original lineup would get 'replaced'. Many fans boycotted Super Junior's products and held silent protests in front of SM Entertainment's main building in Seoul, holding signs of the "Only 13" slogan.

Over one thousand fans appeared in front of the SM Entertainment building on E.L.F's third protest on November 3, 2007. Instead of a silent protest, the fans sang various Super Junior songs and shouted "thirteen." Fans purchased 58,206 stocks of SM Entertainment, holding 0.3% of the company's entire stock. They released a statement through the media, stating that they would obtain all chances to prevent SM Entertainment from adding new members and to keep Super Junior as only thirteen. SM Entertainment later announced that they would not add the new subgroup members to the main group.

=== 2008–2009: Debut and commercial success ===
From April 4 to April 7, 2008, the seven members of Super Junior-M were individually announced to the Chinese media in a chain of short trailer clips. The first member, Han Geng, was announced to be the subgroup leader on April 4. On April 5, Siwon and Donghae were revealed to be the second and third members. On April 6, Kyuhyun was announced to be the fourth Super Junior-M member, following the new member, Henry, as the fifth. Ryeowook and another new member, Zhou Mi, were announced to be the final two members on April 7. A trailer of all seven members was released on the group's debut day, April 8. Super Junior-M's trailer clips exceeded 1.4 million views in less than four days.

Super Junior-M debuted in Beijing on April 8, 2008, at the 8th Annual Music Chart Awards, simultaneously with the release of their first music video, "U" on Sohu.com. "U" is a translated Chinese cover of the 2006 song "U", originally by Super Junior. They released their debut album Me in selected provinces of China starting April 23, 2008. A Korean version of the album with three bonus Korean-language tracks was released in South Korea on April 30, 2008. A modified version of the album was released in Hong Kong, Singapore, and Taiwan on May 2, 2008. Though a majority of the tracks in the album were Mandarin remakes of Super Junior's previous Korean hits, reviews were generally positive. Hong Kong Cantopop singer, Hins Cheung, critiqued the album favorably, saying that the album contains "international-level music" and that the group is "vocally-talented".

A month after their debut, Super Junior-M won their first award, Asia's Most Popular New Group, at the 5th annual Music King Awards in Macau on May 25. They took home another three awards that year. On December 27 and 28, Super Junior-M held their first concert, the Super Junior-M Show, in Hong Kong.

Following their debut performance in April 2008, the group made a few successful guest appearances in many chains of entertainment variety shows to promote their album. They appeared in an episode of the second season of TVB and HunanTV's collaboration show, Strictly Come Dancing, which made the show's ratings increase to 5.01%, ranking it the third most watched show ever in all of China. Super Junior-M's appearance in the talk show Behind Story (Chinese: 背後的故事) also increased ratings. The show had the highest ratings during their time slot, with a strong 4.05%. Separated into several weekly episodes, the group's appearance in their first episode on the challenging game show Bravely Going Forward (Chinese: 勇往直前) in early August gave the show the highest ratings during that time slot as well. In August 2008, Han was cast in the idol television drama Stage of Youth, a mini-drama dedicated to the 2008 Beijing Olympics. Han portrayed Xia Lei, a youth who aspires to be a famous dancer. Other members of Super Junior-M gave cameo appearances in the final episode.

In September 2009, Super Junior-M released their mini album, the EP Super Girl. The album garnered them a nomination for Best Vocal Group at the 21st Golden Melody Awards. The EP's title single "Super Girl" is Super Junior-M's most critically successful song to date, winning numerous accolades for its composition and performances.

=== 2010–2011: Lawsuit, lineup changes and Perfection ===
In December 2009, Hangeng filed for contract termination from SM Entertainment, claiming that the provisions of his contract were unlawful, harsh, and against his rights. Super Junior-M immediately canceled all of their future activities and performances in China and Taiwan. They returned to Korea to begin preparing for Super Junior's fourth studio album. Han, however, stayed in China and signed under a new management, releasing his debut solo album Geng Xin in July 2010. Although Super Junior-M remained largely inactive for most of 2010, they won several accolades for their song "Super Girl" at China's 2010 MusicRadio TOP Awards, including Most Popular Group, Golden Melody Award (Top 15), and Best Composition.

In December 2010, the Seoul Central District Court ruled in favor of Han. However, SM Entertainment announced that they will file an immediate appeal to reverse the decision. In September 2011, Han and SM Entertainment officially came to a mutual agreement regarding Han's contract, closing the case.

In February 2011, Super Junior-M resumed their activities with two new members from the main group, Eunhyuk and Sungmin, with the release of EP Perfection. It debuted at number 2 on Taiwan's G-music chart, and stayed on the chart for four weeks. The repackaged version of the album was released on April 29, debuted at number 2, and stayed on the chart for 10 weeks.

=== 2012–2018: Returned with Break Down, Swing, hiatus and Henry's departure ===
On October 2, 2012, Super Junior-M resumed their activities in China with performance in a special concert to mark the 20th anniversary of South Korea and China's diplomatic ties hosted by Shanghai Media Group. Later on, SM confirmed the group's plan to release a new album. On January 7, 2013, Super Junior-M released their second album, Break Down, along with the lead single of the same name. A press conference took place in Beijing on January 7 and started promotions of the album in China. They promoted the album in South Korean mutizens for a week as well different Fan Meetings in Asia. The song debuted at no.1 on the Billboard charts.

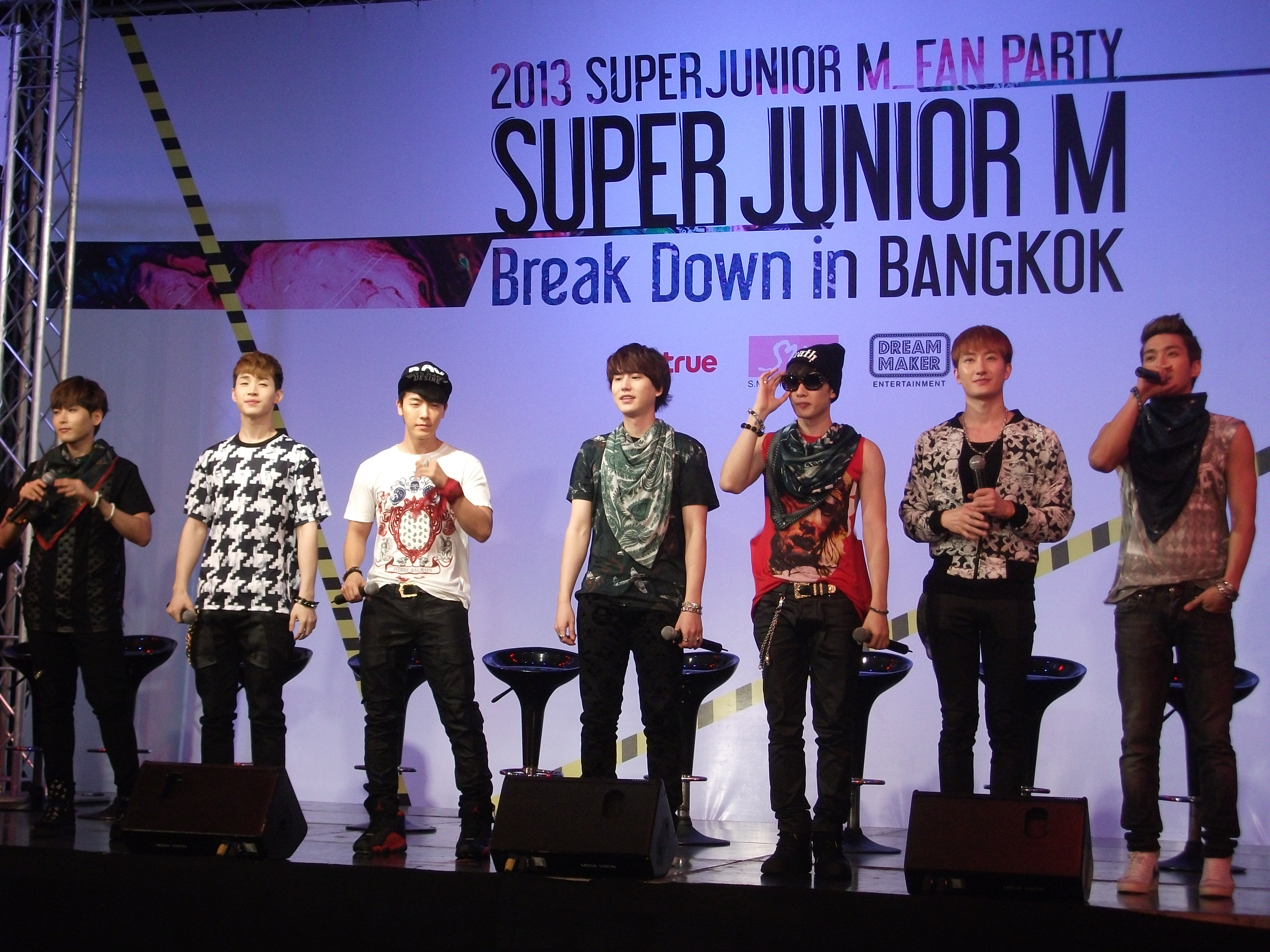
Super Junior-M promoting Break Down in Bangkok in February 2013

After one year and three months, Super Junior-M announced the release of their third EP Swing in China on March 21. To commemorate the release of their third EP, Super Junior-M held comeback press conference held at the Dine Theater located in the CBD (Central Business District) in Beijing on March 22, with the live broadcast viewed by 1.07 million users. The sub-unit also planned to make their comeback stage on China's CCTV music program on the same day. On March 29, they won the first place on China's CCTV music program. The next day, they made their comeback stage in Korea on SBS's Inkigayo. Their third EP was officially released in Korea on March 31, which contains seven-track including the Korean version of "Swing".

In July 2015, Super Junior released their 10th anniversary album Devil with Super Junior-M also participating with their new song "每天" (Forever with You) for the album.

On March 31, 2018, Super Junior-M's parent group, Super Junior, held its seventh world tour Super Show 7 in Taipei. Member Donghae mentioned that Super Junior-M planned to release new album after all members return to the team in 2019, but it never came to fruition following the fandom's boycott on Sungmin.

On April 30, 2018, Henry decided not to renew his contract with SM and left Super Junior-M.

== Members ==
In December 2009, Hangeng departed from the group after filing a lawsuit against their agency S.M. Entertainment. Hangeng subsequently won the lawsuit in December 2010.

In April 2018, Henry parted ways with the group after a decade. SM Entertainment revealed, “Henry’s exclusive contract recently expired, and we have ended on good terms.” Henry has completed his contract with SM Entertainment and he has decided to leave the agency.

Between March 2015 to August 2017, four members completed their mandatory military service: Sungmin enlisted for his service on 31 March 2015, and completed his service on 30 December 2016. Eunhyuk enlisted for his service on 13 October 2015 and was discharged on 12 July 2017. Donghae enlisted for his service on 15 October 2015 and was discharged on 14 July 2017. Siwon enlisted for his service on 19 November 2015 and was discharged on 18 August 2017.

From August 2017 to present, two members enlisted for mandatory military service. Ryeowook enlisted for his service on 11 October 2016 and was discharged 10 July 2018. Kyuhyun enlisted on 25 May 2017 and was discharged on 7 May 2019.

Current active members

- Eunhyuk
- Zhou Mi
- Donghae
- Siwon
- Ryeowook
- Kyuhyun

Current inactive members

- Sungmin (inactive due to him deciding not to participate in the group's return activities)

Former members

- Han Geng
- Henry

== Discography ==
=== Studio albums ===
Title	Album details	Peak chart positions			Sales
Title	Album details	KOR	KOR RIAK	US World	Sales
Me (迷)	Released: April 23, 2008; Label: SM Entertainment; Formats: CD, CD+DVD	35	12	—	KOR: 12,820
Break Down	Released: January 7, 2013; Label: SM Entertainment; Formats: CD, digital download	2	—	1	KOR: 54,095

=== Extended plays ===
Title	Album details	Peak chart positions			Sales
Title	Album details	JPN	KOR	US World	Sales
Super Girl	Released: September 23, 2009; Label: SM Entertainment; Formats: CD, CD+DVD, digital download	36	32	—	
Perfection (太完美)	Released: February 25, 2011; Label: SM Entertainment; Formats: CD, CD+DVD, digital download	5	2	—	KOR: 60,108; TWN: 60,000
Swing	Released: March 21, 2014; Label: SM Entertainment; Formats: CD, digital download	—	1	5	KOR: 66,012

=== Singles ===
Title	Year	Peak chart positions		Album
Title	Year	KOR	US World	Album
"U"	2008	—	—	Me
"Me" (迷)	2008	—	—	Me
"Super Girl"	2009	—	—	Super Girl
"Blue Tomorrow" (到了明天)	2009	—	—	Super Girl
"Perfection" (太完美)	2011	— (Note: The Korean version of "Perfection" peaked at number 88 on the Circle Digital Chart.)	—	Perfection
"Break Down"	2013	—	5	Break Down
"Swing"	2014	— (Note: The Korean version of "Swing" peaked at number 28 on the Circle Digital Chart.)	5	Swing

=== Soundtrack appearances ===
Title	Year	Album
"S.O.L.O" (華麗的獨秀)	2011	Skip Beat! OST
"Stand Up" (我挺你)	2013	Saving General Yang OST
"Goodbye My Love"	2013	A Wedding Invitation OST

== Videography ==
Year	Track	Album	Released
2008	"U"	Me	April 8
2008	"Me" (Chinese Version)	Me	September 13
2008	"Me" (Korean Version)	Me	September 15
2009	"Super Girl" (Chinese Version)	Super Girl	September 14
2009	"Super Girl" (Korean Version)	Super Girl	September 28
2009	"Blue Tomorrow"	Super Girl	November 6
2011	"Perfection" (Chinese Version)	Perfection	February 21
2011	"Perfection" (Korean Version)	Perfection	February 28
2013	"Break Down"	Break Down	31 December 2012 (Teaser); 7 January
2014	"Swing" (Chinese Version)	Swing	March 18 (Teaser 1); March 19 (Teaser 2); March 22
2014	"Swing" (Korean Version)	Swing	March 30

== Awards and nominations ==
Year	Award	Category	Nominated work	Result	Ref.
2008	5th Music King Awards	Asia's Most Popular New Group	Super Junior-M	Won	
2008	6th Southeast Music Chart Awards	Top Ten Golden Melody Award	Me	Won	
2008	6th Southeast Music Chart Awards	Most Popular Group	Super Junior-M	Won	
2008	9th CCTV-MTV Music Awards	Mainland's Best Group	Super Junior-M	Won	
2008	3rd Tencent Starlight Festival	Mainland's Best Group	Super Junior-M	Won	
2008	BQ2008 Popularity List	Asian Popular Group	Super Junior-M	Won	
2008	CCTV 2008 Chinese Entertainment Awards	Mainland's Best Album	Me	Won	
2008	CCTV 2008 Chinese Entertainment Awards	Mainland's Most Popular Group	Super Junior-M	Won	
2009	China Digital Music Awards	Most Downloaded Overseas Singer	Super Girl	Won	
2010	21st Golden Melody Awards	Best Vocal Group	Super Junior-M	Nominated	
2010	China Music Festival	Most Popular Group	Super Junior-M	Won	
2010	China Music Festival	Golden Melody Award (Album Award)	Super Girl	Won	
2010	China Music Festival	Composer Award	Super Girl (Yoo Young Jin)	Won	
2010	China Music Radio Top Awards	Most Popular Group	Super Junior-M	Won	
2011	Global Chinese Golden Chart Awards	Most Popular Group of The Year	Super Junior-M	Won	
2011	Global Chinese Golden Chart Awards	Best Male Group	Super Junior-M	Won	
2011	Singapore Hit Awards	Best Male Group	Super Junior-M	Won	
2012	Singapore's e-Awards	Most Popular Group	Super Junior-M	Won	
2012	Taiwan HITO Music Awards	Most Popular Group	Super Junior-M	Won	
2012	Yahoo! Asia Buzz Awards	Taiwan's Top Searched Artist	Super Junior-M	Won	
2013	Singapore's e-Awards	UFM 100.3 Most Popular Song	"S.O.L.O"	Won	
2013	Taiwan HITO Music Awards	Best Drama OST	"S.O.L.O"	Won	
2013	Baidu Music Awards	Best Group Award	Super Junior-M	Won	
2013	IFPI (Hong Kong Top Sales Music Award)	Best Sales Releases (Japanese and Korean)	Break Down	Won	
2014	Singapore's e-Awards	Most Popular Group	Super Junior-M	Won	
2014	14th Top Chinese Award	Favorite Musical Band and Group	Super Junior-M	Won	
2014	14th Top Chinese Award	Best Music Video	"Break Down"	Won	
2014	2nd YinYuenTai V-Chart Award	Album of The Year	Break Down	Won	
2014	Kugou Music Awards	Most Influential Group of the Year	Super Junior-M	Won	
