= Super Girl (EP) =

- Digital and Version A cover

EP by Super Junior-M
- Released: 23 September 2009
- Recorded: June–August 2009
- Studios: Hub (Seoul); SM Blue Ocean (Seoul); SM Booming System (Seoul); SM Concert Hall (Seoul); SM Yellow Tail (Seoul); T (Seoul)
- Genres: Mandopop; Synthpop; R&B; dance
- Languages: Mandarin; Korean
- Labels: SM; Avex Taiwan (Taiwan); Avex Asia (Hong Kong)
- Producer: Lee Soo-man

Super Junior-M chronology
Me (2008)	Super Girl (2009)	Perfection (2011)

Singles from Super Girl
- 1. "Super Girl" Released: 14 September 2009; 2. "Blue Tomorrow" Released: 6 November 2009

Super Girl is the first extended play (EP) and second overall release by South Korean Mandopop boy band Super Junior-M, sub-group of Super Junior. It was released by SM Entertainment on 23 September 2009. It was released in Taiwan on the same day by Avex Taiwan and in Hong Kong on 25 September by Avex Asia and also in mainland China. It was the last Super Junior-M album to feature Hangeng due to his lawsuit the same year.

The album features five tracks in Mandarin, with high-tempo dance track "Super Girl", written by Yoo Young-jin, as the first lead single and ballad "到了明天" (Blue Tomorrow) as second lead track. A deluxe version B was released on 18 December 2009 in Taiwan and Hong Kong with two bonus tracks of Korean version of "Super Girl" and "到了明天" (Blue Tomorrow), plus a DVD with three music videos and behind-the-scenes footage.

== Background ==
In July 2009, shortly after promotions concluded for Super Junior's third studio album Sorry, Sorry, several members of Super Junior-M wrote on their blogs that recordings of a new album for the subgroup has started, and that a few songs were already finished. Members Zhou Mi and Henry were seen returning to Seoul to participate in the recording.

== Reception ==
The album debuted at number one on Taiwan's G-Music Weekly Top 20 Mandarin and Combo Charts; and Five Music Mandarin Chart for the week of 18 to 24 September 2009, after three days of release. The track "Super Girl" is listed at number 29 on Hit Fm Taiwan's Hit Fm Annual Top 100 Singles Chart for 2009.

In 2010, the group was nominated for Best Vocal Group at 21st Golden Melody Awards, Taiwan for their work on this album.

== Track listing ==
No.	Title	Lyrics	Music	Translation	Length
1.	"Super Girl"	Aibi	Yoo Young-jin		3:40
2.	"到了明天 (Blue Tomorrow)"	Ma Zhiyong	Park-Ki Wan	Until Tomorrow	4:53
3.	"告白 (Confession)"	Zhou Mi	E-Tribe		3:19
4.	"動情 (Only U)"	Kenzie	Karen Poole/Greg Kurstin	Enamored	2:58
5.	"愛情接力 (You & Me)"	Zhou Mi	Lee-Jae Myoung	Love Relay	3:45

Version B (CD)
No.	Title	Lyrics	Music	Translation	Length
1.	"Super Girl"	Aibi	Yoo Young-jin		3:40
2.	"到了明天 (Blue Tomorrow)"	Ma Zhiyong	Park-Ki Wan	Until Tomorrow	4:53
3.	"告白 (Confession)"	Zhou Mi	E-Tribe		3:19
4.	"動情 (Only U)"	Kenzie	Karen Poole/Greg Kurstin	Enamored	2:58
5.	"愛情接力 (You & Me)"	Zhou Mi	Lee-Jae Myoung	Love Relay	3:45
6.	"Super Girl" (Korean Version)	Yoo Young-jin	Yoo Young-jin		3:37
7.	"내일이면 "Blue Tomorrow"" (Korean Version)	Park-Ki Wan	Park-Ki Wan		4:39

Version B (DVD)
No.	Title	Notes	Length
1.	"Super Girl MV"	Chinese version	3:40
2.	"Super Girl MV"	Korea version	3:40
3.	"到了明天 (Blue Tomorrow) MV"		3:19
4.	"Super Girl photoshoot"	Chinese subtitled
5.	"Super Girl MV behind-the-scene"	Chinese subtitled

== Music videos ==
Three music videos were produced in support of the album: "Super Girl" in Chinese and Korean version; and "到了明天" (Blue Tomorrow).

The music video for "Super Girl" was directed by Cho Soo-Hyun and filmed in a studio in Yangsu-ri, Gyeonggi-do, South Korea in August 2009. On 11 September, a 32-second teaser video of it was released throughout Asia, and the full version was released on 14 September on Super Junior's official YouTube channel, China's Sohu news portal, Taiwan's Avex Taiwan homepage and Thailand's GMM website.

The music video of "Super Girl", includes intercut sequences of choreographed dancing by Super Junior-M and that of a nerd (played by Han Geng) who accidentally crashes into a house party. Warmly welcomed by the DJ and others, Han begins taking random pictures of the people in the party with his cell phone. He comes upon a beautiful girl (Jessica of Girls' Generation), and begins taking photos of her. Annoyed, Jessica pushes him away with a disgusted look. Rejected and hurt, Han leaves. Wanting to catch Jessica's attention one more time, he changes into a suitable party boy attire and confidently walks back into the party, surprising Jessica with his new appearance, and wins her into dancing with him.

The music video for "到了明天" (Blue Tomorrow) was released on 7 November 2009. It features the seven Super Junior-M members sitting in a gray space in sad positions and in some scenes are shown singing the song in an empty white space that later has snows falling in the background. The theme of the video deals with a recent broken-up in a relationship. It also includes scenes with colourful objects, e.g. roses and what appears to be love notes with hearts, used for symbolizing a happy relationship being tossed in a fire.

== Release history ==
Country	Date	Format	Distributing label
South Korea	23 September 2009	CD	SM Entertainment
Taiwan	23 September 2009	CD	Avex Taiwan
Taiwan	18 December 2009	CD+DVD (Version B)	Avex Taiwan
Hong Kong	25 September 2009	CD	Avex Asia
Hong Kong	18 December 2009	CD+DVD (Version B)	Avex Asia
China	September 2009	CD	Sky Music
Philippines	18 November 2009	CD	Universal Records
Japan	24 February 2010	CD	Rhythm Zone

== Charts ==
Chart	Country	Period	Peak position	Notes/Ref
G-Music Combo Chart	Taiwan	Week 38 (18–24 September 2009)	#1	8.21% sales
G-Music Mandarin Chart	Taiwan	Week 38 (18–24 September 2009)	#1	16.88% sales
Five Music Mandarin Chart	Taiwan	Week 39 (18–24 September 2009)	#1	12.1% sales
China TOP Music Chart	China	–	#1	
Music One Top 25	Philippines	16–22 November	#1	
Countdown Asian Chart (V Channel)	Thailand	–	#1	
Oricon Weekly Albums	Japan	February 22-March 1, 2010	#36	

== Award and nominations ==
Year	Award	Category	Nominated work	Result
2009	China Digital Music Awards	Most Downloaded Overseas Singer	Super Girl	Won
2010	21st Golden Melody Awards	Best Vocal Group	Super Girl	Nominated
2010	China Music Festival	Most Popular Group	Super Girl	Won
2010	China Music Festival	Golden Melody Award (Album Award)	Super Girl	Won
2010	China Music Festival	Composer Award	Super Girl (Yoo Young Jin)	Won
2010	China MusicRadio Top Awards	Most Popular Group	Super Girl	Won
2011	Global Chinese Golden Chart Awards	Most Popular Group of The Year	Super Girl	Won
