= Irving Szathmary =

American musical composer (1907–1983)

Irving Szathmary

Irving Szathmary, born Isadore Szathmary (Quincy, Massachusetts, October 30, 1907 – Valletta, Malta, October 29, 1983) was an American musical composer and arranger most known for scoring the television series Get Smart.

== Biography ==
He was one of six children of Hungarian Jewish ancestry; his youngest brother was comedian Bill Dana. Szathmary was a child prodigy pianist from the age of five. Before graduating from Quincy High School in 1925, he adopted the name "Irving". At the same time he formed a band with his brother Albert, the Szathmary Symphonic Syncopaters. Al Szathmary later had a career as an actor and was a stand-in on Get Smart.

== Musical career ==
Szathmary began arranging for a variety of orchestras, including Benny Goodman in 1934, Emery Deutsch in 1935, Artie Shaw in 1936, and Andre Kostelanetz from 1936 to 1977 and from 1937, Paul Whiteman until joining Jack Teagarden in 1940.

During World War II he transcribed many orchestral pieces on V-Disc for American servicemen and began recording arrangements for featured singers such as Frank Sinatra and Mary Martin. He composed a hit song, "Leave It To Love", in 1948.

He composed the music for a 1950 United Nations radio program about drug addiction called The Shooting Gallery that was narrated by Gary Cooper. Later in the 1950s he arranged music for Your Hit Parade and The Ed Sullivan Show.

When his comedian brother Bill arrived in New York in the early 1950s, performing stand-up under his birth name Szathmary, Irving admonished him with "Don't you know that I have a reputation in music?" that led Bill to adopt the surname "Dana" after their mother "Dena". He sometimes used the names Szath-Myri and Irving Zathmary.

In 1959 he headed Citation Records.

== Television work ==
Bill Dana introduced his brother to comedy writer and television producer Leonard Stern to compose the music for Stern's television show I'm Dickens, He's Fenster. Stern suggested something like the Laurel and Hardy theme. Szathmary returned a day or two later with a theme. "I sensed there was something unique about it," says Stern, but Szathmary decided to prepare a more elaborate demonstration. Another day or two later, he returned with a bass player, drummer, saxophonist and even a vocalist with Irving playing piano. "Finally I started to hear the distinctive melody," says Stern. "So I hired him, and he made the arrangements and conducted the orchestra as well."

Szathmary also composed the music for an unsuccessful Stern 1963 television pilot Duncan Be Careful and composed the background music for his brother's The Bill Dana Show.

His collaboration with Stern led him to compose the theme and score all the episodes of Get Smart. He retired to Malta when the series left the air.
