= Orgel (EP) =

EP by Sungmin
- Released: November 22, 2019
- Recorded: 2019
- Studios: Doobdoob (Seoul); MonoTree (Seoul); SM Big Shot(Seoul); SM SSAM (Seoul); SM LVYIN(Seoul); SM Yellow Tail (Seoul)
- Genres: K-pop; K-ballad
- Length: 18:49
- Language: Korean
- Labels: Label SJ; SM; Dreamus
- Producer: Tak Young-jun

Singles from Orgel
- 1. "Orgel" Released: November 22, 2019

Music videos
- "Orgel" on YouTube

Orgel is the debut extended play of South Korean singer, Sungmin. The album released on November 22, 2019, under Label SJ, and was distributed by SM Entertainment and Dreamus. "Orgel" served as the album's lead single.

== Background and release ==
On July 6, 2017, Sungmin announced that he would be taking a hiatus from Super Junior due to fan boycotts regarding his marriage in 2014. Sungmin remained on hiatus from musical activities and Super Junior throughout 2018 and most of 2019, with his only solo release being "Daydream," via SM Station on March 2, 2018.

On November 3, 2019, Label SJ announced that Sungmin would be returning to make his solo debut in mid-November, marking his first official musical activity since Super Junior's Mamacita in 2014. On November 10, 2019, SM tweeted that Sungmin's mini-album would be titled "Orgel," with 5 tracks and a release date of November 22 at 6 PM KST. The album's tracklist was revealed on November 14 and a highlight medley was released on November 19. The album and its music video released on November 22.

== Reception ==
Orgel peaked at #14 on the Gaon Album Chart on its first week. The EP also sold 6,182 copies in Korea. Internationally, EP ranked #1 in iTunes top album chart in 11 countries.

== Track listing ==
All credits adapted from artist page.

No.	Title	Lyrics	Music	Arrangement	Length
1.	"Orgel" (오르골; oleugol; lit. Music Box)	MonoTree	MonoTree	MonoTree	3:34
2.	"Stay" (꽃말; kkochmal; lit. Flower Language)	정영아	이방원사단, 영국신사	이방원사단, 영국신사	3:45
3.	"Zzz..."	MilkyWave	MilkyWave, Denis Seo	Denis Seo	3:14
4.	"Rest" (쉼표; swimpyo)	메이져리거(CLEF), 오수연(CLEF), CLEF CREW	메이져리거(CLEF), 오수연(CLEF), CLEF CREW	메이져리거(CLEF), 오수연(CLEF)	4:15
5.	"I Pray"	Sungmin, Jo Yoon-kyung	Eric Ng, Keon Chia	Eric Ng	4:01
6.	"Day Dream (CD Only)" (낮 꿈; naj kkum)	정준호	어깨깡패	어깨깡패	3:52

== Charts ==
=== Weekly charts ===
Chart performance for Orgel
Chart (2019)	Peak position
South Korean Albums (Gaon)	14

=== Monthly charts ===
Monthly chart performance for Orgel
Chart (2019)	Peak position
South Korea (Gaon)	45

== Release history ==
Release history for Orgel
Region	Date	Format	Label
South Korea	November 22, 2019	CD	SM; Label SJ; Dreamus
Various	November 22, 2019	Digital download; streaming	SM; Label SJ
