= Evanesce (song) =

Single by Super Junior

from the album This Is Love
- Language: Korean
- Released: October 27, 2014
- Recorded: 2014
- Studio: SM Blue Ocean (Seoul)
- Length: 3:44
- Label: SM; KT
- Composers: Dominique "DOM" Rodriguez; Teddy Riley; Tesung Kim; Andrew Choi
- Lyricist: Misfit
- Producers: Red Rocket; Tesung Kim; Andrew Choi

Super Junior singles chronology
"This Is Love" (2014)	"Evanesce" (2014)	"Devil" (2015)

Music video
- "Evanesce" on YouTube

"Evanesce" (Korean: 백일몽; RR: Baegilmong; lit. 'Daydream') is a song recorded by South Korean boy band Super Junior. It was released as the second single from the repackage album, This Is Love, on October 27, 2014, by SM Entertainment and distributed by KT Music.

As of September 2025, this is the most recent single to feature Sungmin's vocals, before his enlistment the following year and his voluntary hiatus due to fan boycott over his marriage.

== Background ==
On August 27, "Evanesce" was first included as one of the B-sides of Super Junior's seventh Korean studio album, Mamacita, as its third track. On October 17, SM announced that Super Junior will release a repackage album This Is Love on October 27, fronted by "This Is Love" and "Evanesce" as its lead singles.

The song and its music video were released on October 27.

== Composition ==
"Evanesce" was penned by songwriter Misfit, expressing love that will soon disappear as daydream. The song was co-composed by Dominique Rodriguez, Teddy Riley, Tesung Kim, and Andrew Choi in the key of G Minor with the tempo of 107 beats per minute.

The song featured the vocals of 10 members: Leeteuk, Heechul, Kangin, Shindong, Sungmin, Eunhyuk, Donghae, Siwon, Ryeowook, and Kyuhyun. Yesung was absent from the recording due to mandatory military service.

== Music video ==
The music video for "Evanesce" was released on SM's official website, its YouTube channel and Naver TV, with the concept of sadness and emptiness, showing contrast with the preceding single "This Is Love". The part featuring member Eunhyuk with a female dancer was filmed using SM's one-take technique to capture the sensual choreography.

== Promotions ==
Super Junior performed "Evanesce" during their M Countdown appearance on October 23. The following day, the song was performed in Music Bank with an appearance in Inkigayo on the 26th.

The song was included in Super Junior's fourth Asia-wide concert tour, Super Show 6.

== Charts ==
Chart performance for "Evanesce"
Chart (2014)	Peak position
South Korea (Gaon)	144
US World Digital Song Sales (Billboard)	17

== Credits ==
Credits adapted from album's liner notes.

Studio

- SM Blue Ocean Studio – recording
- SM Yellow Tail Studio – mixing
- Sonic Korea – mastering

Personnel

- SM Entertainment – executive producer
- Lee Soo-man – producer
- Kim Young-min – executive supervisor
- Red Rocket – producer, composition, arrangement
  - Teddy Riley – composition, arrangement
  - Dominique Rodriguez – composition, arrangement
- Andrew Choi – producer, composition, arrangement, background vocals
- Tesung Kim – producer, composition, arrangement
- Super Junior – vocals
  - Ryeowook – background vocals
  - Kyuhyun – background vocals
- Moon Doo-ri a.k.a Misfit – lyrics
- Maxx Song – vocal directing, digital editing
- Kim Cheol-sun – recording
- Lee Ji-hong – digital editing
- Koo Jong-pil – mixing
- Jeon Hoon – mastering

== Release history ==
Region	Date	Format(s)	Distributor
Various	October 27, 2014	Digital download; streaming	SM; KT
