= This Is Love (Super Junior song) =

2014 Super Junior single

- Promotional photo for "This Is Love"

Single by Super Junior

from the album Mamacita and This Is Love
- Language: Korean
- Released: October 23, 2014
- Recorded: 2014
- Studio: In Grid (Seoul)
- Genre: R&B
- Length: 3:49; 4:07 (stage version)
- Label: SM; KT
- Composer(s): Kim Ji-hoo; Park Seul-gi; Lola Fair; Nermin Harambašić
- Lyricist(s): Kim Hee-chul; Kim Ji-won; Jo Yoon-kyung

Super Junior singles chronology
"Mamacita" (2014)	"This Is Love" (2014)	"Evanesce" (2014)

Music video
- "This Is Love" on YouTube

"This Is Love" is a song recorded by South Korean boy band Super Junior that was released by their label SM Entertainment and distributed by KT Music on October 23, 2014.

The track previously appeared in the Mamacita album as a B-side track, before being re-released in a remixed version called "Stage Version" as the lead single of the repackaged album of the same name as the track.

== Background ==
In August 2014, Super Junior had a comeback by releasing their seventh studio album, Mamacita, which included the lead single of the same name.

On October 17, SM Entertainment announced that Super Junior will have another comeback on October 23 with the digital version of repackage album This Is Love, with the physical version available on October 31. On October 20, SM uploaded a teaser video for "This Is Love" and its follow-up single "Evanesce" on their official website and YouTube channel.

The single and its music video was released on October 23.

== Composition ==
"This Is Love" features the vocals of ten Super Junior members — Leeteuk, Heechul, Kangin, Sungmin, Donghae, Shindong, Eunhyuk, Siwon, Ryeowook, and Kyuhyun. Yesung's vocals was not featured as he was on his mandatory military service.

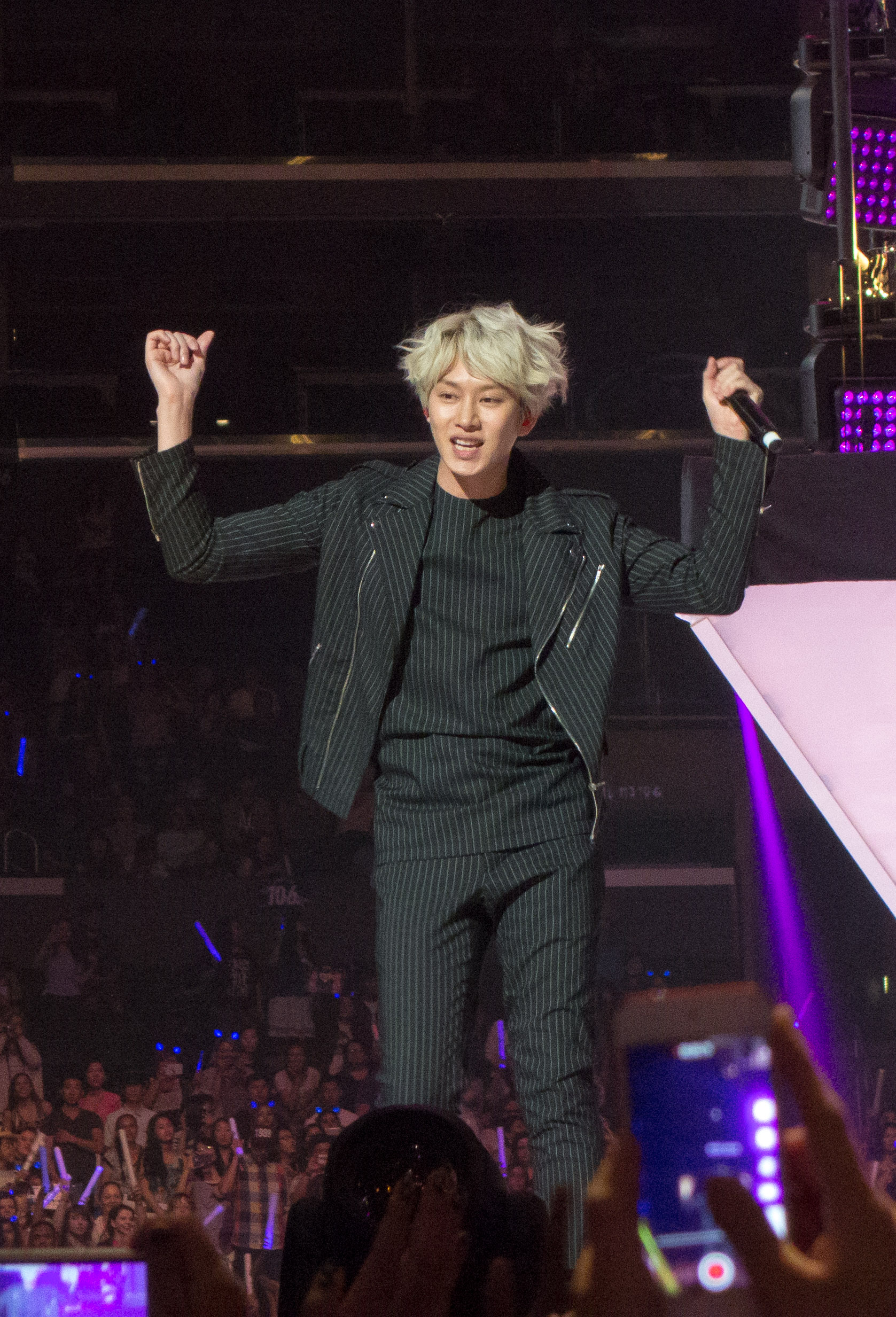
Member Heechul is one of the co-lyricists of the song

The track is described as an uptempo R&B song. It is composed and arranged in the key of D Major, with the tempo of 111 beats per minute by Kim Ji-hoo, Park Seul-gi, Lola Fair, and Nermin Harambašić.

Member Heechul was credited as the co-lyricists along with Jo Yoon-kyung and Kim Ji-won, narrating the lyrics that describe simple, yet true love.

== Music video ==
The music video of "This Is Love" begins with Kyuhyun entering a black-and-white Jazz bar where his bandmates have gathered. The Super Junior members danced to the song in suits. On the bridge section of the track, Donghae, and Eunhyuk had a solo dance under the spotlight. As the song reaches its climax, the video begins to gradually shift into colors.

It was directed by Hong Won-ki, who directed the music video for the preceding single "Mamacita". Shindong actively participated in stage direction, choreography, costumes, set, and props.

== Live performances ==
The group promoted the song on various shows in South Korea. They promoted the song in M Countdown on October 23, which marks Sungmin's first domestic live appearance after announcing his marriage in September. The following day, they appeared on Music Bank to perform the song along with "Evanesce", another single from the repackaged album. On October 26, the group promoted the song on Inkigayo.

The song would later be included in their set list for Super Show 6 and Super Show 7 concerts. In 2016, Yesung included the song as part of his first solo Japanese tour Super Junior medley set list.

== Charts ==
Weekly chart performance for "This is Love (Stage Version)"
Chart (2014)	Peak positions
South Korea (Gaon)	62
US World Digital Song Sales (Billboard)	8

== Accolades ==
Publisher	Year	Listicle	Nominee/work	Placement	Ref.
Billboard	2019	Top 100 Greatest K-Pop Songs of the 2010s	"This Is Love"	76th	

== Credits ==
Credits adapted from album's liner notes.

=== Studio ===
- In Grid Studio – recording
- SM Blue Ocean Studio – mixing
- Sonic Korea – mastering

=== Personnel ===
- SM Entertainment – executive producer
- Lee Soo-man – producer
- Kim Young-min – executive supervisor
- Super Junior – vocals
  - Heechul – lyrics
  - Ryeowook – background vocals
  - Kyuhyun – background vocals
- Kim Ji-won – lyrics
- Jo Yoon-kyung – lyrics
- Kim Ji-hoo – composition, arrangement
- Park Seul-gi – composition, arrangement
- Lola Fair – composition, arrangement
- Nermin Harambašić – composition, arrangement
- G-High – vocal directing, Pro Tools operating, digital editing
- Lee Ju-hyung – background vocals
- Gil Eun-kyung – keyboards
- Choi Hoon – bass
- Hong Jun-ho – guitar
- Jeong Eun-kyung – recording
- Kim Yong-geun – recording
- Kim Cheol-sun – mixing
- Jeon Hoon – mastering

== Release history ==
Release dates and formats
Region	Date	Format(s)	Version	Distributor
Various	August 29, 2014	Digital download; streaming	Original	SM; KT
Various	October 23, 2014	Digital download; streaming	Stage Version	SM; KT
