= The President (South Korean TV series) =

South Korean television series

- Promotional poster
- Hangul: 프레지던트
- RR: Peurejideonteu
- MR: P'ŭrejidŏnt'ŭ
- Genre: Drama, Political
- Based on: Eagle: The Making of an Asian-American President by Kaiji Kawaguchi
- Written by: Son Young-mok; Jung Hyun-min; Son Ji-hye
- Directed by: Kim Hyung-il
- Starring: Choi Soo-jong; Ha Hee-ra
- Country of origin: South Korea
- No. of episodes: 20

Production
- Producers: Shin Chang-suk; Kim Sang-hwi
- Camera setup: Multi-camera
- Running time: Wednesdays and Thursdays at 21:05 (KST)

Original release
- Network: KBS 2TV
- Release: December 15, 2010 – February 24, 2011

The President (Korean: 프레지던트) is a South Korean television series starring real-life married couple Choi Soo-jong and Ha Hee-ra as Korea's president and his first lady. This is their first acting collaboration. It aired on KBS2 from December 15, 2010, to February 24, 2011, on Wednesdays and Thursdays at 21:05 for 24 episodes.

== Plot ==
The drama follows the presidential election process to shed light on the right way of politics, the qualifications of a future Korean president, and also the personal tribulations and ambitions of politicians hidden behind the power struggles. Three months before the presidential nominating convention, Jang Il-joon, from the New Wave Party, declared his candidacy. On that same day, a woman died in a gas explosion in Sam-Chuk. There is little doubt that the accident and the nomination of Jang Il-joon are related. Meanwhile, Yoo Min-ki, a documentary producer, heard of his mother's sudden death and headed for Sam-Chuk. As he cast his mother's ashes in the sea, he thought of his childhood: his father always blurt out that Min-ki was not his own son whenever he was drunk. Min-ki believed that his father was telling the truth because he had seen his mother tearing up and looking at an old photograph of a man often. Min-ki discovered that the photograph was gone when he was cleaning up his mother's belongings. After the funeral, Min-ki returned to Seoul and Jang Il-joon asked Min-ki to work as a PR agent to record the election campaign process. Min-ki asked Il-joon why he was chosen, and Il-joon confessed that Min-ki was his son. The man in the picture Min-ki had seen was Jang Il-joon. However, Min-ki felt something had gone wrong as he realized that the picture had disappeared. Now Min-ki suspects that his mother's death was not an accident and that Jang Il-joon had actually killed her.

== Errors ==
=== Episode 9 ===
At the election in Gangwon-Do the total number of votes cast is 1,530. 6 of these votes are spoiled, so the total number of valid votes is 1,524. However, according to the English subtitles, the votes cast for the four candidates add up to 1,531.

== Casts ==
=== Main cast ===
- Choi Soo-jong as Jang Il-joon
- Ha Hee-ra as Jo So-hee
- Jay Kim as Yoo Min-ki
- Wang Ji-hye as Jang In-young
- Lee Sung-min as Jang Sung-min

=== Supporting cast ===
- Kang Shin-il as Lee Chi-soo
- Im Ji-eun as Oh Jae-hee
- Lee Doo-il as Hong Sung-goo
- Kim Heung-soo as Ki Soo-chan
- Park Mi-jin as Jang Se-bin
- Shin Choong-shik as Jo Tae-ho
- Choi Dong-joon as Jo Sang-jin
- Kim Ye-ryeong as Yoo Jung-hye
- Kang Shin-jo as Hwang Chul-woo
- Jung Han-yong as Lee Soo-myung
- Yang Hee-kyung as Choi Jung-im
- Byun Hee-bong as Go Sang-ryul
- Lee Ki-yeol as Park Eul-sub
- Kim Jung-nan as Shin Hee-joo
- Hong Yo-seob as Kim Kyung-mo
- Kim Kyu-chul as Baek Chan-ki

=== Guest cast ===
- Jung Dong-hwan as Han Dae-woon (cameo)
