= Lady Cha Dal-rae's Lover =

2018 South Korean TV series

- Promotional poster
- Hangul: 차달래 부인의 사랑
- RR: Cha Dalrae buinui sarang
- MR: Ch'a Tallae puinŭi sarang
- Genre: Family
- Created by: KBS Drama Production
- Written by: Choi Soon-sik
- Directed by: Ko Yang-tak
- Starring: Ha Hee-ra; Ahn Sun-young; Ko Eun-mi
- Country of origin: South Korea
- Original language: Korean
- No. of episodes: 100

Production
- Executive producers: Lee Myung-suk; Sohn Ok-hyun
- Running time: 40 minutes
- Production companies: Yein E&M

Original release
- Network: KBS2
- Release: September 3, 2018 – January 18, 2019

Lady Cha Dal-rae's Lover (Korean: 차달래 부인의 사랑) is a 2018 South Korean morning soap opera. It aired on KBS2 from September 3, 2018.

This followed the last-ever TV Novel drama, Through the Waves. It marked the revival of the KBS2 morning drama format, nearly seven years after Pit-a-pat, My Love was replaced by the TV Novel series in 2011. Due to low ratings averaging 7.3%, the morning drama timeslot was quickly cancelled again, and was replaced by reruns of KBS1's daily dramas.

== Plot ==
This is a drama which tells the life of three middle-aged woman who graduated from the same high school.

== Cast ==
=== Main ===
- Ha Hee-ra as Cha Jin-ok
- Ahn Sun-young as Oh Dal-sook
- Ko Eun-mi as Nam Mi-rae
- Kim Eung-soo as Kim Bok-man
- Kim Hyeong-beom as Tak Ho-se
- Jung Wook as Kam Sun-ho

=== Supporting ===
- Kim Ha-rim as Kim So-young
- Ahn Jae-sung as Kim Dae-young
- Kim Se-hee as Tak Il-ran
- Kim Ji-in as Tak Yi-ran
- Jun Ho-young as Kang Dong-hyun
- Hong Il-kwon as Baek Hyun-woo
- Kim Jung-min as Baek Ho

== Awards and nominations ==
Year	Award	Category	Recipient	Result	Ref.
2018	KBS Drama Awards	Excellence Award, Actress in a Daily Drama	Ha Hee-ra	Won	
2018	KBS Drama Awards	Excellence Award, Actor in a Daily Drama	Kim Eung-soo	Nominated	
