= Ha Hee-ra =

South Korean actress (born 1969)

- 하희라
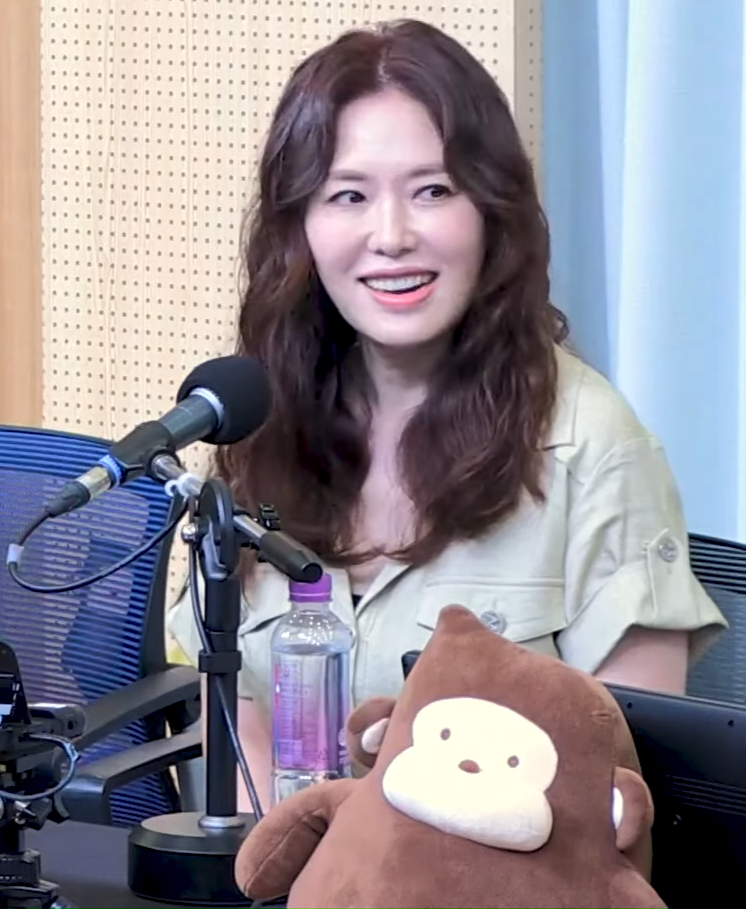
- Ha in August 2022
- Born: October 29, 1969 (age 57); Seoul, South Korea
- Education: Dongguk University (B.Ed.); Yonsei University (M.S.W.)
- Occupations: Actress; special professor
- Years active: 1981–present
- Agent: GH Entertainment
- Spouse: Choi Soo-jong (m. 1993)
- Children: 2

Korean name
- Hangul: 하희라
- Hanja: 夏希羅
- RR: Ha Huira
- MR: Ha Hŭira

Chinese name
- Traditional Chinese: 夏希羅
Transcriptions
Standard Mandarin
- Hanyu Pinyin: Xià Xīluó

Ha Hee-ra (Korean: 하희라; born October 29, 1969) is a South Korean actress. She began acting as a child in 1981, became known as a teen star in the 1980s and moved into adult roles with the 1990 drama What Women Want. Her television dramas include What Is Love (1991), Catching Up with Gangnam Moms (2007), The President (2010) and Make a Woman Cry (2015). She has also worked in musical theater and plays.

== Early life and education ==
Ha was born in Seoul on October 29, 1969. Her father was an ethnic Chinese resident of Korea, and her mother was Korean. She held Taiwanese nationality until her marriage, after which she became a South Korean citizen. She spoke Chinese as a child but later forgot most of it. On a television talk show in 2008, she said that schoolmates had teased her about her mixed background.

From the sixth grade of elementary school, Ha sang in the KBS children's choir, and she considered studying vocal music at university. In 1988, as a first-year university student, she performed in a production of Romeo and Juliet, which she later said was when she first became attached to the stage. She graduated from the Department of Education at Dongguk University. In 2010, she began graduate studies in social welfare at the Graduate School of Public Administration of Yonsei University.

== Career ==
=== 1981–1992: Early career ===
Ha began acting in 1981, and she went on to appear in the KBS series Diary of a High School Student and Windfall. She became known as a "high-teen" actress while still a teenager. In the late 1980s, she and Choi Soo-jong were both popular young stars, and they appeared together on the music program Youth March and in the films Puppy Love and You Know What? It's a Secret. She won the Baeksang Arts Award for Best New Actress in film in 1988.

Her first major adult role was the lively Young-chae in the 1990 drama What Women Want. She was also part of the cast of the 1991 MBC family drama What Is Love, written by Kim Soo-hyun, which reached a peak viewership rating of 64.8 percent.

=== 1993–2009: Stage and return to television ===
Ha starred in the musical Save the Last Dance for Me with Nam Kyung-joo and Choi Jung-won in 1994, and she received the Popular Star Award at the first Korea Musical Awards. In 1998, she played Sister Mary Amnesia in the musical Nunsense.

After four years away from television, Ha resumed her career in April 2002 with the film The Beauty in Dream. In July 2002, she returned to television in the KBS daily drama To Be with You, playing Moon-hee, the eldest of four sisters, who builds her own clothing brand. She won the Top Excellence Award for an actress at the MBC Drama Awards in 2006. In 2007, she played a mother preoccupied with her children's education in the SBS drama Catching Up with Gangnam Moms.

In 2008, she returned to musical theater after about ten years, playing Paula, a divorced former Broadway dancer, in the Korean premiere of The Goodbye Girl at the Baekam Art Hall in Seoul.

=== 2010–present ===
In December 2010, Ha played the first lady opposite her husband, who played the president, in the KBS drama The President. It was the first time that the couple had acted together in the same production since their marriage. She said that she had hesitated because she would be acting opposite her husband, but that she loved the character.

After two years away from television, Ha played the villainous Na Eun-soo in the 2015 MBC weekend drama Make a Woman Cry, which drew a viewership rating of about 20 percent. In 2018, after another two-year break, she played Cha Jin-ok, a housewife with a hidden tough side, in the KBS2 morning drama Lady Cha Dal-rae's Lover. She won the Excellence Award for an actress in a daily drama at the 2018 KBS Drama Awards for the role. In 2020, she played Han Ae-sook, the supportive mother of Park Bo-gum's character, in the tvN drama Record of Youth.

In September 2022, Ha returned to the stage after 14 years, playing the free-spirited painter Melissa in a Korean production of A. R. Gurney's two-person play Love Letters at the JTN Art Hall in Daehak-ro, Seoul. She reprised the role in 2024. In November 2026, she was scheduled to perform the play with Choi Soo-jong, their first stage production together since their marriage.

=== Television presenting and reality programs ===
In January 2021, Ha and Choi replaced Paeng Hyun-sook and Choi Yang-rak as the hosts of the KBS2 reality program Mr. House Husband 2. The couple received the Achievement Award at the 2021 KBS Entertainment Awards. From October 2022, they appeared in the KBS2 program Second House, in which cast members renovate abandoned country houses. The program's second season ended in August 2023, and the couple were made honorary residents of Jinan County. Ha also hosted the program Dear My Mother from 2023. In 2025, she and Choi appeared in the tvN program We Are Not a Lovey-Dovey Couple, playing husband and wife in dramatized reconstructions of real couples' problems.

== Personal life ==
Ha married Choi Soo-jong in 1993, and they have a son and a daughter. After her marriage, she converted from Buddhism to Presbyterianism.

== Philanthropy ==
In November 2007, Ha and Choi donated 100 million won to the relief organization Good Neighbors International to mark their 14th wedding anniversary. The donation was used to provide food, warm clothing and winter supplies to children in child care centers and welfare facilities across South Korea. In 2009, the couple supported a campaign against tuberculosis. In 2010, the National Tax Service appointed them as goodwill ambassadors for two years, citing their honest payment of taxes and their donations to people in need. In 2012, the couple pledged to donate their tissues after death.

== Filmography ==
=== Film ===
Year	Title	Role
1986	Great March of Tomboys	
1987	Exciting Lives of Three Girls	
1988	Miri, Mari, Wuri, Duri	Duri
1988	Campus Romance Seminar	Hye-ri
1988	If You Want	
1988	Puppy Love	
1989	Memories of Bal-bari	Eun-kyung
1990	You Know What? It's a Secret	Hye-na
1990	Days of Standing Alone	Hyun Eun-ji
1991	Back to You Once More	Kim Sung-hee
1991	The Night Full of Stars	Bo-ra
1992	A Foolish Lover	Hye-rin
2002	The Beauty in Dream	So-ra

=== Television series ===
Year	Title	Role
1981	Land	
1983	Diary of a High School Student	
1986	Windfall	
1987	Eldest Sister-in-law	
1988	Heaven Heaven	Lady Hyegyŏng
1988	The Story of Shim Chung	
1989	And So Flows History	
1989	People of Dangchu-dong	
1990	What Women Want	Young-chae
1990	Geom Saeng-yi's Daughter	
1991	Magpie Daughter-in-law	Seo Bong-hwa
1991	What Is Love	Park Ji-eun
1992	Rose Garden	Choi Young-joo
1992	Wind in the Grass	Mi-kyung
1993	The Break of Dawn	Song Bo-kyung/Ssang-soon
1995	A Place in the Sun	Im Cha-hee
1995	Dazzling Dawn	Empress Myeongseong
1997	Because I Really	Hong Eun-pyo
1997	Women	Seo Ki-nam
2002	To Be with You	Han Moon-hee
2005	My Love Toram	Jeon Sook-yeon
2005	I Love You, My Enemy	Myung Hae-kang
2006	Love Me When You Can	Oh Soon-ae
2007	Catching up with Gangnam Moms	Hyun Min-joo
2009	What's for Dinner?	Jo Young-ran
2010	I Live Without Incident	Hwang Se-ri
2010	The President	Jo So-hee
2012	Dummy Mommy	Kim Sun-young
2013	You Are the Boss!	Min Ji-soo/Min Ji-won
2015	Make a Woman Cry	Na Eun-soo
2016	The Dearest Lady	Na Bo-bae
2018	Lady Cha Dal-rae's Lover	Cha Jin-ok
2020	Record of Youth	Han Ae-sook, Sa Hye-jun's Mother

=== Television shows ===
Year	Title	Notes/Ref.
2012	Beautiful People	Documentary narration
2012	Mom and Dad, I Miss You	Documentary narration
2013	Children at Risk	
2013–2014	Global Homestay: The Way Home	
2018	Same Bed, Different Dreams 2: You Are My Destiny	
2022	Children These Days - My Golden Child	Special MC
2022	Second House	Cast Member
2023	Dear My Mother	Host

== Theater ==
Year	Title	Role
1991	I Ought to Be in Pictures	
1994	Save the Last Dance for Me	
1998	Nunsense	
2004	Why We Dream of Lovers	
2008	The Goodbye Girl	Paula McFadden
2022	Love Letter	Melissa

== Awards and nominations ==
Year	Award	Category	Nominated work	Result
1986	KBS Drama Awards	Excellence Award, Actress		Won
1988	24th Baeksang Arts Awards	Best New Actress (Film)	Campus Romance Seminar	Won
1988	KBS Drama Awards	Special Award		Won
1990	KBS Drama Awards	Excellence Award, Actress		Won
1990	KBS Drama Awards	Popularity Award		Won
1991	27th Baeksang Arts Awards	Best Actress (TV)	What Women Want	Won
1991	MBC Drama Awards	Excellence Award, Actress		Won
1992	28th Baeksang Arts Awards	Most Popular Actress (TV)	What Is Love	Won
1992	MBC Drama Awards	Excellence Award, Actress	What Is Love	Won
1993	KBS Drama Awards	Grand Prize (Daesang)	The Break of Dawn	Won
1995	1st Korea Musical Awards	Popular Star Award	Save the Last Dance for Me	Won
1995	KBS Drama Awards	Top Excellence Award, Actress	A Place in the Sun	Won
2005	SBS Drama Awards	Best Actress in a Drama Short	My Love Toram	Won
2006	MBC Drama Awards	Top Excellence Award, Actress	Love Me When You Can	Won
2007	SBS Drama Awards	Excellence Award, Actress in a Miniseries	Catching Up with Gangnam Moms	Won
2009	MBC Drama Awards	Excellence Award, Actress	What's for Dinner?	Nominated
2010	2nd Korea Sharing Awards	Special Chairman's Award	—N/a	Won
2011	3rd Korea Human Awards	Sharing Award	—N/a	Won
2012	1st Sharing Happiness Awards	Award from the Minister of Health and Welfare	—N/a	Won
2012	SBS Drama Awards	Top Excellence Award, Actress in a Serial Drama	Dummy Mommy	Nominated
2013	MBC Drama Awards	Top Excellence Award, Actress in a Serial Drama	You Are the Boss!	Nominated
2014	Miss Supertalent Season 4 Star Awards	Sharing Award	—N/a	Won
2018	KBS Drama Awards	Excellence Award, Actress in a Daily Drama	Lady Cha Dal-rae's Lover	Won
2021	19th KBS Entertainment Awards	Achievement Award	Mr. House Husband 2	Won
2021	19th KBS Entertainment Awards	Excellence Award in Reality Category	Mr. House Husband 2	Nominated
