= You Are the Boss! =

- Promotional poster
- Also known as: Good For You
- Genre: Family; Romance
- Written by: Park Ji-hyun
- Directed by: Lee Min-soo; Kim Yong-min
- Starring: Ha Hee-ra; Lee Hyung-chul; Shim Hyung-tak; Kim Bin-woo
- Composers: Choi Wan-hee; Kim Ester
- Country of origin: South Korea
- Original language: Korean
- No. of episodes: 108

Production
- Executive producer: Choi Chang-wook
- Cinematography: Kim Yeon-jung
- Editor: Bae Jung-hwa
- Production company: MBC C&I

Original release
- Network: Munhwa Broadcasting Corporation
- Release: May 6 – October 4, 2013

You Are the Boss! (Korean: 잘났어 정말; RR: Jallasseo jeongmal; lit. You're Great, Really!) is a 2013 South Korean television drama starring Ha Hee-ra, Lee Hyung-chul, Shim Hyung-tak and Kim Bin-woo. The morning soap opera aired on MBC from May 6 to October 4, 2013, on Mondays to Fridays at 7:50 a.m. for 108 episodes.

== Cast ==
Main characters

- Ha Hee-ra as Min Ji-soo / Min Ji-won
- Lee Hyung-chul as Cha Woo-sung
- Shim Hyung-tak as Lee Seon-nam
- Kim Bin-woo as Lee Seon-mi

Supporting characters

- Park Geun-hyung as Lee Dae-gwan
- Cha Joo-ok as Jung In-kyung
- Moon Young-mi as Kim Young-ok
- Jang Ye-seul as Bae Sa-rang
- Jang Hee-soo as Jang Ok-ja
- Park Sung-hoon as Yoo Deok-hwa
- Hwang Ji-ni as Heo Young-mi
- Park Joon-hyuk as Bae Ki-cheol
- Moon Seo-yeon as Do Do-hee
