= Kim Jung-nan =

South Korean actress (born 1971)

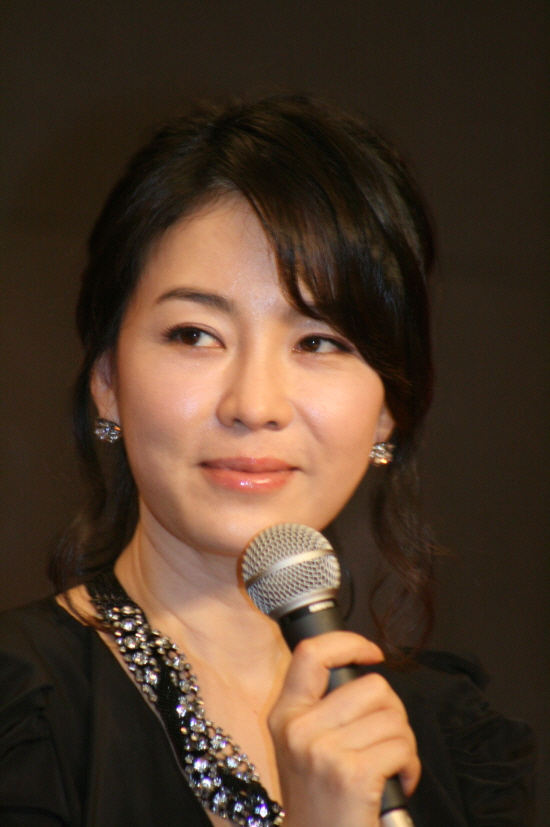
- Kim in July 2010
- Born: Kim Hyun-ah; July 16, 1971 (age 55); South Korea
- Education: Dongguk University (Theater and Film)
- Occupations: Actress; radio personality
- Years active: 1991–present
- Agent: K-star Entertainment

Korean name
- Hangul: 김정난
- RR: Gim Jeongnan
- MR: Kim Chŏngnan

Birth name
- Hangul: 김현아
- Hanja: 金賢雅
- RR: Gim Hyeona
- MR: Kim Hyŏna

Kim Jung-nan (Korean: 김정난; born July 16, 1971), birth born Kim Hyun-ah, is a South Korean actress. Kim made her acting debut in 1991, but received a new surge of popularity after starring in A Gentleman's Dignity in 2012.

== Filmography ==
=== Film ===
Year	Title	Role	Ref.
2001	Nabi	Traveling employee	
2005	Daddy-Long-Legs	Lee Ji-hyun	
2006	Tazza: The High Rollers	Se-ran	
2008	Santamaria	Yang-ja	
2008	Baby and I	Ms. Cho	
2009	Beetles	Jeon Hee-soo	
2011	Meet the In-Laws	Young-ja	
2012	Grape Candy	Jung-eun	
2024	Audrey	Oh Mi-yeon	

=== Television series ===
Year	Title	Role	Notes	Ref.
1991	Asphalt My Hometown			
1992	Tomorrow Love	Hwang Jin-sun		
1996	Their Embrace			
1997	The Mountain	Nam-hee		
1998	The King and the Queen	Jeong Gwi-in		
1999	Rising Sun, Rising Moon			
1999	Now is the Time to Love			
2000	Fireworks			
2000	Three Friends	Doctor/Florist	Cameo	
2000	Promise	Ji-soo		
2000	Daddy Fish	Yeo Jin-hee		
2001	Girls' High School	English teacher		
2002	Fox and Cotton Candy	Bong In-hwa		
2002	Album of Life	Lee Ae-rim		
2003	On the Prairie	Na Ae-ran		
2003	My Fair Lady	Yoon Jung-hee		
2003	Not Divorced	Yoo Seung-hye		
2003	Between Agasshi and Ajumma	Kim Jung-nan		
2004	My Lovely Family	Young-ran		
2004	Love is All Around	Park Se-mi		
2005	Dangerous Love	Yoon Soo-wan		
2005	That Woman	Ha Jung-sun		
2006	Thank You Life	Han Kyung-sook		
2006	Love Me When You Can	Jo Eun-soo		
2007	Mermaid Story	Nam Soo-hyun		
2007	Time Between Dog and Wolf	Yoo Kyung-hwa		
2007	Kid Gang	Young-sook		
2008	Why Did You Come to My House	Han Deuk-soo		
2008	You Are My Destiny	Ban So-young		
2009	Partner	Kim Young-suk		
2009	Creating Destiny	Kim Yoon-hee		
2010	OB & GY	Kim Min-sun	(guest, episodes 10-11)	
2010	Grudge: The Revolt of Gumiho	Lady Yang		
2010	KBS Drama Special: "Boy Meets Girl"	Gu Mi-young		
2010	The President	Shin Hee-joo		
2011	You're Fine That Way	Korean language teacher		
2012	A Gentleman's Dignity	Park Min-sook		
2012	Bridal Mask	Lee Hwa-gyung		
2012	KBS Drama Special: "The Flight of the Spoonbill"	Joo-hee		
2013	All About My Romance	Go Dong-sook		
2013	Thrice Married Woman	Jung Tae-hee		
2014	What Happens to My Family?	Noh Young-seol		
2015	Who Are You: School 2015	Shin Jung-min		
2015	Bubble Gum	Oh Se-young		
2016	Fantastic	Choi Jin-sook		
2017	Ms. Perfect	Na Hye-ran		
2018	Sky Castle	Lee Myung-joo		
2019	Doctor Prisoner	Oh Jung-Hee		
2019	Crash Landing on You	Ma Yeong-ae		
2020	Born Again	Jang Hye-mi		
2020	Tale of the Nine Tailed	Taluipa		
2021	Mouse	Seong Ji-eun		
2021	Snowdrop	Hong Ae-ra		
2022	Reborn Rich	Son Jeong-rae		
2023	Tale of the Nine Tailed 1938	Taluipa		
2024	Queen of Tears	Hong Beom-ja		
2024	Serendipity's Embrace	Baek Do-seon		
2025	Buried Hearts	Cha Deok-hee		
2026	To My Beloved Thief	Daebi Mama		

=== Radio shows ===
Year	Title	Role	Ref.
2007–present	Radio City with Kim Jung-nan	DJ	
2012-–2013	Sweet Nights in Your City	DJ	

=== Television shows ===
Year	Title	Role	Notes	Ref.
2013	Saturday Night Live Korea	Host	episode 22	
2013–2014	Veranda Show with Cultwo	Host		
2013	Housekeeping Chat Show - The Queen	Host		
2015	Some Guys, Some Girls	Cast member		
2019	Tell Me	Cast member		

== Awards and nominations ==
Year	Award	Category	Nominated work	Result
1993	7th KBS Drama Awards	Best New Actress	Tomorrow Love	Won
1994	30th Baeksang Arts Awards	Best New Actress	Tomorrow Love	Won
2008	22nd KBS Drama Awards	Excellence Award, Actress in a Daily Drama	You Are My Destiny	Won
2010	24th KBS Drama Awards	Excellence Award, Actress in a Miniseries	Grudge: The Revolt of Gumiho; The President	Nominated
2012	1st K-Drama Star Awards	Acting Award, Actress	A Gentleman's Dignity	Won
2012	20th SBS Drama Awards	Special Acting Award, Actress in a Weekend/Daily Drama	A Gentleman's Dignity	Won
2012	26th KBS Drama Awards	Best Supporting Actress	Bridal Mask	Nominated
2013	21st SBS Drama Awards	Special Acting Award, Actress in a Miniseries	All About My Romance	Nominated
2019	33rd KBS Drama Awards	Best Supporting Actress	Doctor Prisoner	Won
2019	33rd KBS Drama Awards	Best Couple Award with Jang Hyun-sung	Doctor Prisoner	Won
