= Super Show 6 =

2014–15 concert tour by Super Junior

- World tour by Super Junior
- Promotion poster for Super Show 6
- Associated album: Mamacita; This Is Love
- Start date: September 19, 2014
- End date: July 12, 2015
- No. of shows: 22

Super Junior concert chronology
- Super Show 5 (2013–14); Super Show 6 (2014–15); Super Camp (2015–16)

Super Show 6 is the fourth Asia-wide concert tour and sixth tour overall by South Korean boy band Super Junior, in support of their seventh studio album, Mamacita. The world tour commenced with three shows in Seoul from September 19 to 21, 2014 and hit a total of 100 concerts for its Super Show series.

This tour marks the return of leader Leeteuk, who was discharged from mandatory military service in July 2014, and is the most recent tour to feature Sungmin as of 2026.

== Concerts ==
The tour was announced on July 7, 2014, even before Super Junior started the promotion for their seventh studio album, Mamacita. Tickets for the September 20–21 concert in Seoul went on sale on August 7 and were sold out in 9 minutes. Later, the group added one more day on September 19 due to high demand and the tickets went on sale on August 21 at 8PM KST. The concert on September 21 marks the 100th Super Show concert in the Super Show series.

On October 29 and 30, 2014, Super Junior launched Super Junior World Tour in Tokyo in Tokyo Dome, gathering over 110,000 fans. Super Junior launched solo concerts in Tokyo Dome three years in a row since 2012 and sold out tickets to the two-day concert. The members communicated with the fans in Japanese and announced the release of Japanese single Mamacita (Ayaya) on December 17, 2014, as well as the launch of the Fukuoka Dome concert on December 30, 2014.

On November 29 and 30, 2014, Super Junior launched World Tour Super Show 6 in Taipei in Taipei Arena for 22,000 fans. Tickets were also sold out for both rounds of the concert and it was attended by numerous media outlets, such as TVBS, The China Times, The Liberty Times and more. The group concluded the tour in Bangkok over two days on January 10 and 11, 2015 at the Impact Arena.

On May 27, 2015, SM Entertainment announced that Super Junior would hold encore concerts for Super Junior World Concert Super Show 6, which took place on July 11 and 12 at the Olympic Park Gymnastics Hall in Seoul. Like the Super Show 6 that was held in September 2014, the encore concerts would showcase performances of hit songs for both the group and individual members. Yesung, who was recently discharged from the military, rose to the stage with Super Junior after two years and four months.

== Setlist ==
South Korea (Opening Weekend)

Super Junior Intro

- "Twins (Knockout)"
- "Bonamana" (Rock ver.)
- NANTA - Sungmin
- "Sorry, Sorry" (with Heechul on drums)

First video interlude

- "U"
- Dear. TWO - Eunhyuk
- "Midnight Blues"
- "그녀는 위험해 (She Wants It)"
- First MENT
- "Mr. Simple"

Second video interlude

- "Don't Leave Me" (Composed by Siwon)
- "Evanesce"
- Second MENT

Third video interlude (Kyuhyun and Changmin)

- "My Thoughts, Your Memories" - Kyuhyun (Composed and written by Kyuhyun and Changmin)
- "상심 (Heartbreak)" - Kangin
- "사랑한다는 흔한 말 (Love, The Common Word)" - Ryeowook
- "This Is Love"
- "Islands"

Fourth video interlude

- "Swing" - Super Junior-M
- "Fantastic" - Henry
- "太贪心 (Blind)" - Zhoumi
- "1+1=LOVE" - Donghae (feat. Eunhyuk)
- "Motorcycle" - Donghae & Eunhyuk (Korean ver.)
- "Hello" - Donghae & Eunhyuk (Korean ver.)
- "Oppa, Oppa" - Donghae & Eunhyuk

Fifth video interlude

- "Nothin' On You" - Leeteuk (feat. Sungmin on guitar)

Sixth video interlude

- "야생마 (Wild Horse)" - Siwon

Seventh video interlude

- Frozen cosplay stage
- "Rokkugo!!"

Eighth video interlude

- "잊지 말아요 (Don't Forget)" - Shindong
- Third MENT
- "Too Many Beautiful Girls"
- "Shirt"
- "Rockstar"
- "Let's Dance"

Encore

- "Mamacita"
- Fourth MENT
- "Walkin'"
- "너로부터 (From U)"
- Ending MENT
- "Haru"
Hong Kong

Super Junior Intro

- "Twins (Knockout)"
- "Bonamana" (Rock ver.)
- NANTA - Sungmin
- "Sorry, Sorry" (with Heechul on drums)

First video interlude

- "U"
- Dear. TWO - Eunhyuk
- "Midnight Blues"
- "그녀는 위험해 (She Wants It)"
- First MENT
- "Mr. Simple"

Second video interlude

- "Don't Leave Me" (Composed by Siwon)
- "Islands"
- Second MENT

Third video interlude (Kyuhyun and Changmin)

- "My Thoughts, Your Memories" - Kyuhyun (Composed and written by Kyuhyun and Changmin)
- "상심 (Heartbreak)" - Kangin
- "七里香" - Ryeowook
- "This is Love"
- "Evanesce"

Fourth video interlude

- "Swing" - Super Junior-M
- "Fantastic" - Henry
- "挽回 (Rewind)" - Zhoumi
- "1+1=LOVE" - Donghae (feat. Eunhyuk)
- "Motorcycle" - Donghae & Eunhyuk (Korean ver.)
- "Hello" - Donghae & Eunhyuk (Korean ver.)
- "Oppa, Oppa" - Donghae & Eunhyuk

Fifth video interlude

- "Nothin' On You" - Leeteuk (feat. Sungmin on guitar)

Sixth video interlude

- "야생마 (Wild Horse)" - Siwon

Seventh video interlude

- Frozen cosplay stage
- "Rokkugo!!"

Eighth video interlude

- "잊지 말아요 (Don't Forget)" Video ver. - Shindong
- Third MENT
- "Too Many Beautiful Girls"
- "Shirt"
- "Rockstar"
- "Let's Dance"

Encore

- "Mamacita"
- Fourth MENT
- "Walkin'"
- "너로부터 (From U)"
- Ending MENT
- "Haru"
- "一個人的寂寞 Canto Ver.(Love Sick)" - Zhoumi

== Tour dates ==
List of concert dates
Date	City	Country	Venue	Attendance
September 19, 2014	Seoul	South Korea	Jamsil Arena	25,000
September 20, 2014	Seoul	South Korea	Jamsil Arena	25,000
September 21, 2014	Seoul	South Korea	Jamsil Arena	25,000
October 29, 2014	Tokyo	Japan	Tokyo Dome	110,000
October 30, 2014	Tokyo	Japan	Tokyo Dome	110,000
November 8, 2014	Hong Kong	China	AsiaWorld–Arena	—
November 22, 2014	Beijing	China	MasterCard Center	—
November 29, 2014	Taipei	Taiwan	Taipei Arena	22,000
November 30, 2014	Taipei	Taiwan	Taipei Arena	22,000
December 5, 2014	Osaka	Japan	Kyocera Dome	135,000
December 6, 2014	Osaka	Japan	Kyocera Dome	135,000
December 7, 2014	Osaka	Japan	Kyocera Dome	135,000
December 20, 2014	Fukuoka	Japan	Fukuoka Dome	—
January 10, 2015	Bangkok	Thailand	Impact Arena	20,000
January 11, 2015	Bangkok	Thailand	Impact Arena	20,000
February 7, 2015	Shanghai	China	Mercedes-Benz Arena	10,000
March 1, 2015	Macau	China	Cotai Arena	—
March 29, 2015	Nanjing	China	Nanjing Olympic Sports Center Gymnasium	—
May 1, 2015	Singapore		Singapore Indoor Stadium	8,000
May 3, 2015	Tangerang	Indonesia	Indonesia Convention Exhibition	8,000
July 11, 2015	Seoul	South Korea	Olympic Gymnastics Arena	20,000
July 12, 2015	Seoul	South Korea	Olympic Gymnastics Arena	20,000
Total				N/A

== Personnel ==
- Artists:
  - Super Junior: Leeteuk, Heechul, Yesung (encore only), Kangin, Shindong (Seoul only), Sungmin (until Macau only), Eunhyuk, Donghae, Siwon, Ryeowook and Kyuhyun
  - Super Junior-M: Zhou Mi and Henry Lau
- Tour organizer: SM Entertainment, Shindong
- Tour promoter: Dream Maker Entercom, Shindong

== Live album ==
Super Show 6 – Super Junior World Tour Concert Album

Live album by Super Junior
- Released: November 6, 2015
- Recorded: September 19–21, 2014
- Venues: Jamsil Arena, Seoul, South Korea
- Genres: K-pop, R&B, electropop, synthpop, dance, hip hop, rock, trot
- Length: 58:44 (Disc 1); 60:05 (Disc 2)
- Languages: Korean, some English
- Labels: SM Entertainment, KMP Holdings
- Producer: Lee Soo Man
- Compiler: SM Entertainment

Super Junior chronology
Super Show 5 Concert Album (2015)	Super Show 6 – Super Junior World Tour Concert Album (2015)

Super Show 6 – Super Junior World Tour Concert Album is Super Junior's sixth live recorded album, released on 6 November 2015. This album contains two CDs with 36 live recordings from the Super Show 6 concerts held on September 19–21, 2014 at the Jamsil Arena located in Seoul, South Korea.

=== Track listing ===
CD 1

1. Intro-The Legend of SS6 (1:41)
2. Intro-Take Over The Stage (1:42)
3. Twins (Knock Out) (3:19)
4. 미인아 (Bonamana) (Rock Ver.) (3:05)
5. Sorry, Sorry (Drum Performance Ver.) (4:48)
6. U (3:56)
7. Dear. Two - Eunhyuk (2:44)
8. 춤을 춘다 (Midnight Blues) (4:21)
9. 그녀는 위험해 (She Wants It) (4:06)
10. Mr. Simple (4:16)
11. Don't Leave Me (3:44)
12. 백일몽 (Evanesce) (3:47)
13. 나의 생각, 너의 기억 (My Thoughts, Your Memories) - 규현 (2:55)
14. 상심 (Heartbroken) - Kangin (2:51)
15. 사랑한다는 흔한 말 (Never Got To Say That I Love You) - Ryeowook (3:08)
16. This Is Love (Stage Ver.) (3:48)
17. Islands (4:33)

CD 2

1. Swing (Korean Ver.) (3:44)
2. Fantastic - Henry(SJM) (3:42)
3. 내 욕심이 많았다 (太貪心) (Chinese Ver.) - Zhou Mi(SJM) (3:50)
4. 1+1=Love - Donghae (2:44)
5. Motorcycle (Korean Ver.) - Donghae & Eunhyuk (1:40)
6. Hello - Donghae & Eunhyuk (2:31)
7. 떴다 오빠 (Oppa, Oppa) - Donghae & Eunhyuk (4:01)
8. Nothing on You - Leeteuk (2:43)
9. 야생마 (Wild Horse) - Siwon (2:14)
10. 로꾸거!! (Rokuko) (3:02)
11. 잊지 말아요 (Don't Forget Me) - Shindong (4:13)
12. Too Many Beautiful Girls (3:21)
13. Shirt (Rearranged) (3:18)
14. Rockstar (Rearranged) (1:34)
15. Let's Dance (Rearranged) (3:32)
16. Mamacita (아야야) (3:27)
17. Walkin' (3:45)
18. 너로부터 (From U) (3:14)
19. 하루 (HARU) (3:30)
