= Sisters of the Sea =

- Also known as: Sea of Sisters
- Genre: Drama; Romance
- Written by: Lee Hee-woo
- Directed by: Im Hwa-min; Kim Geun-hong
- Starring: Go Jung-min; Lee Yoon-ji
- Country of origin: South Korea
- Original language: Korean
- No. of episodes: 155

Production
- Producer: Jang Geun-soo

Original release
- Network: Munhwa Broadcasting Corporation
- Release: August 1, 2005 – January 27, 2006

Sisters of the Sea (Korean: 자매바다; RR: Jamaebada) is a South Korean weekday morning television drama that aired on MBC from August 1, 2005 to January 27, 2006. The series followed the lives of the Song sisters.

== Cast ==
=== Main characters ===
- Go Jung-min as Song Jung-hee
  - Kim So-eun as young Song Jung-hee
- Lee Yoon-ji as Song Choon-hee
  - Lee Se-young as young Song Choon-hee
- Kim Chan-woo as Kang Dong-shin
  - Lee Sung-min as young Kang Dong-shin
- Lee Hyung-chul as Woo Choong-geun
  - Kim Seung-hyun as young Woo Choon-geun

=== Supporting characters ===
- Kim Hyun-joo as Kim Soon-young
- Yoon Gi-won as Kim Seok-goo
- Jung Won-jung as Jung Myeong-jin
- Yeo Woon-kay as Cho Han-bin
- Cha Joo-ok as Jung Min-ja
- Jang Tae-sung as Jung In-chul
- Noh Hyun-hee as Woo Choong-hee
- Jung Han-yong as Song Tae-il
- Kyeon Mi-ri as Lee Geum-bok
- Na Han-il as Jang Ho-sik
