= Lee Hyung-chul =

South Korean actor

- Born: February 19, 1971 (age 55); Gumi, South Korea
- Education: City University of New York
- Occupation: Actor
- Years active: 1991–present

Korean name
- Hangul: 이형철
- Hanja: 李亨哲
- RR: I Hyeongcheol
- MR: I Hyŏngch'ŏl

Lee Hyung-chul (born February 19, 1971) is a South Korean actor. He is best known for his supporting roles in television dramas, notably in Scent of Man (2003), Sisters of the Sea (2005), On Air (2008), City Hall (2009), Pasta (2010), War of the Roses (2011) and You Are the Boss! (2013). In 2008, Lee played Henry Higgins in the stage musical My Fair Lady.

== Filmography ==
=== Television series ===
| Year | Title | Role | Network |
|---|---|---|---|
| 1995 | Bold Men | | KBS2 |
| 1996 | Reporting for Duty | Jang Pan-kyo | KBS2 |
| 1996 | Power of Love | Moon Jung-hwi | MBC |
| 1999 | KAIST | guest | SBS |
| 2000 | The More I Love You | Son Kwang-ho | MBC |
| 2000 | Snowflakes | Chef Jang | SBS |
| 2001 | Flower Story | Sa Sa-ki | KBS1 |
| 2003 | KBS TV Novel: Buni | Bae Jin-hwan | KBS1 |
| 2003 | Scent of Man | Jung Hoe-ryong | MBC |
| 2003 | Desert Spring | Seung-mo / Ikarashi Hideo | MBC |
| 2005 | KBS TV Novel: Wind Flower | Kim In-pyo | KBS1 |
| 2005 | Sisters of the Sea | Woo Choong-geun | MBC |
| 2006 | Special of My Life | Kim Tae-jin | MBC |
| 2006 | Hwarang Fighter Maru | Park Won-kyung | KBS2 |
| 2006 | Over the Rainbow | Jeong Sang-hyun | MBC |
| 2007 | Dear Lover | Jang Hyun-seok | SBS |
| 2008 | On Air | Jin Sang-woo | SBS |
| 2009 | The City Hall | Lee Jung-do | SBS |
| 2010 | Pasta | Geum Seok-ho | MBC |
| 2011 | War of the Roses | Hwang Dong-tak | SBS |
| 2013 | Jang Ok-jung, Living by Love | Prince Boksun | SBS |
| 2013 | You Are the Boss! | Cha Woo-sung | MBC |
| 2015 | Flower of Queen | Seo In-chul | MBC |
| 2016 | Second to Last Love | Park Cheon-soo | SBS |
| 2023 | XO, Kitty | Mr. Han | Netflix |

=== Film ===
| Year | Title | Role |
|---|---|---|
| 1997 | The Last Defense | Han Jang-dol |
| 2002 | The Hidden Princess | Roy |
| 2004 | Hi! Dharma 2: Showdown in Seoul | Gu-man |
| 2006 | Love Phobia | Dr. Kang (cameo) |
| 2007 | Voice of a Murderer | Han Sang-woo |
| 2012 | Deranged | James Kim |
| 2019 | No Mercy | Ha Sang-man |
| 2027 | K-Pop: The Debut | TBA |

== Musical theatre ==
| Year | Title | Role |
|---|---|---|
| 2008 | My Fair Lady | Henry Higgins |

== Awards and nominations ==
| Year | Award | Category | Nominated work | Result |
|---|---|---|---|---|
| 2008 | SBS Drama Awards | Best Supporting Actor in a Drama Special | On Air | Nominated |
| 2009 | SBS Drama Awards | Best Supporting Actor in a Drama Special | City Hall | Nominated |
