= Love Me When You Can =

- Genre: Drama; Romance; Family
- Written by: Seo Young-myung
- Directed by: Jang Geun-soo; Kim Woo-sun
- Starring: Ha Hee-ra; Kim Yoon-seok; Kim Bo-ra; Lee Min-jung; Sunwoo Yong-nyeo
- Country of origin: South Korea
- Original language: Korean
- No. of episodes: 169

Production
- Producer: Yoon Jae-moon
- Production company: JS Pictures

Original release
- Network: Munhwa Broadcasting Corporation
- Release: July 17, 2006 – March 9, 2007

Love Me When You Can (Korean: 있을때 잘해; RR: Isseulttae jalhae) is a 2006 South Korean morning soap opera broadcast by MBC starring Ha Hee-ra, Kim Yoon-seok, Kim Bo-ra and Lee Min-jung. The series was directed by Jang Geun-soo and Kim Woo-sun. It premiered on July 17, 2006 and ended on March 9, 2007 airing every Mondays to Fridays at 7:50 a.m. for 169 episodes.

== Synopsis ==
After discovering her husband's affair, Oh Sun-ae (Ha Hee-ra) tries to start a new life, but when the past (along with the new woman) just won't go away, moving on is not easy. Still, Oh Sun-ae is determined.

== Cast ==
=== Ha family ===
- Ha Hee-ra as Oh Sun-ae (housewife for 13 years)
- Kim Yoon-seok as Ha Dong-gyu (husband, businessman)
- Kim Bo-ra as Ha Yoo-mi (daughter)
- Lee Min-jung as Ha Jung-hwa (Dong-gyu's sister)
- Sunwoo Yong-nyeo as Park Geum-rae (Dong-gyu's mother)

=== Oh family ===
- Park Hyung-joon as Oh Seung-hyun (Sun-ae's brother)
- Kim Jung-nan as Jo Eun-soo (Seung-hyun's wife)
- Shin Choong-sik as Sun-ae's father

=== Extended cast ===
- Byun Woo-min as Kang Jin-woo (child psychologist)
- Han Da-min as Lee Ji-hye (Jin-woo's nurse receptionist)
- Ji Soo-won as Bae Young-jo (model agency supervisor)
- Lee Hyun-kyung as Goh Yu-jin (single mom, Young-jo's best friend)
- Kyung Joon as Yoo Hwan (Ha Jung-hwa's boyfriend)
- Han Eun-sun as Jin-woo's arranged date
- Kim Dong-bum as Oh Hyun-soo

== See also ==
- List of South Korean dramas
