= My Love Toram =

- Hangul: 내사랑 토람이
- RR: Nae sarang Torami
- MR: Nae sarang T'orami
- Genre: Drama
- Written by: Yoon Young-mi
- Directed by: Han Jung-hwan
- Starring: Ha Hee-ra
- Country of origin: South Korea
- Original language: Korean
- No. of episodes: 2

Production
- Running time: Friday at 21:45 (KST)

Original release
- Network: Seoul Broadcasting System
- Release: January 7, 2005

My Love Toram (Korean: 내사랑 토람이) is a 2005 South Korean two-part SBS Special Drama starring Ha Hee-ra. It is based on the real Jun Suk-yeon's book about her beloved dog. Jun is the first woman in Korea to own a guide dog.

== Plot ==
Jeon Sook-yeon (Ha Hee-ra) is happily married with two children, but becomes blind in an accident. At first in despair, she finds new hope to live again through the help of her guide dog, Toram.

== Cast ==
- Ha Hee-ra as Jeon Sook-yeon
- Kim Young-ho as Kim Sung-min
- Kwon Hae-hyo as Yeom Dong-ho
- Kim Hak-joon as Kim Bum-young
- Ha Seung-ri as Kim Eun-bi
- Lee Dae-yeon as Kim Il-bong
