= Mamacita (album) =

- Digital and A version cover

Studio album by Super Junior
- Released: August 29, 2014
- Recorded: June – August 2014
- Studio: Doobdoob (Seoul); In Grid (Seoul); SM Big Shot (Seoul); SM Blue Cup (Seoul); SM Blue Ocean (Seoul); SM Booming System (Seoul); SM Yellow Tail (Seoul); Sound Pool (Seoul)
- Genre: K-pop; neo soul; R&B; jazz-pop
- Length: 37:44; 49:29 (This Is Love - repackage)
- Language: Korean
- Label: SM; KT Music
- Producer: Lee Soo-man

Super Junior chronology
Hero (2013)	Mamacita (2014)	Devil (2015)

Singles from Mamacita
- 1. "Mamacita" Released: August 29, 2014

This Is Love cover
- Ten different versions of the album cover forming the word "This Is Love"

Singles from This Is Love
- 1. "This Is Love" Released: October 23, 2014; 2. "Evanesce" Released: October 27, 2014

Mamacita (stylized as MAMACITA) is the seventh Korean studio album (eighth overall) of South Korean boy band Super Junior. It was released on September 1, 2014, by SM Entertainment and was released online on August 29, 2014. This is their first Korean album since Sexy, Free & Single was released in 2012. On October 16, 2014, it was announced that a special version of the album, named This is Love, would be released on October 27, 2014.

The album features 10 members, marking the return of members Leeteuk and Heechul after their mandatory military service. It features the vocals of Yesung in some songs, who was in mandatory military service during the production of the album. As of 2025, it is the most recent album from the group to feature Sungmin, who has been on hiatus since 2015.

== Background ==
The group went on hiatus for two years and one month while waiting for their leader, Leeteuk who was serving in mandatory military service. In 2013 and the beginning of 2014 the sub-units Super Junior-M and Donghae & Eunhyuk actively worked on their own albums and touring, while the full group successfully completed their World Tour Super Show 5 and achieved some accolades and records overseas.

With the discharge of Leeteuk coming sooner, the members of the group started to hint they were recording a new album and also some of them updated their SNS with pictures in the recording studio. A week before the discharge of Leeteuk, they also uploaded a picture of the full group rehearsing together, causing great excitement. One of the pictures revealed that the famous choreographer Tony Testa was working with them.

It was announced in August 2014 that the group would be making their comeback later that month with a full album and new world tour Super Show 6. The title of the album was revealed, increasing the anticipation, with around forty teaser images released in the following days. Finally the group released an image video teaser with a Western storyline, a music video teaser showcasing parts of the choreography and the chorus of the song and a Highlight Medley of the studio album.

== Production & composition ==
The album is full of new sounds, different beats, old school R&B and pop music. It was revealed that Teddy Riley, Jason J. Lopez and Yoo Young-jin worked on the title track, which is described as an "urban new jack swing track with an Indian percussion base and piano melody that is reminiscent of a DJ remix."

The album has a total of 10 songs, and features composers Don Spike, Team One Sound and Hitchhiker. Band member Donghae contributed music and lyrics to the song 'Shirt,' and also 'Islands' which is about the group's friendship and loyalty. Band member Siwon also wrote the lyrics to ‘Don't Leave Me’, which was found on the repackaged album.

== Promotion ==
=== Release ===
Super Junior held a press conference at the Imperial Palace Hotel in Gangnam, Seoul on August 28, 2014. A few hours later, the official music video was released and it quickly reached one million views in less than 9 hours and two million views in less than 22 hours. It ended up being the most viewed k-pop music video of August 2014 despite being released at the end of the month. On the Chinese site YinYueTai Super Junior became the second group on achieve a perfect 100.00 score for the music video (Super Junior-M's "Swing" music video, being the first one).

On August 29 at 00:00 (KST) the album was released in digital format in South Korea. Over the next few days, it also became available through iTunes for oversea fans. The physical version of the album was available for pre-order a week before and became sold out in Synnara Store. On September 1 the album hit the stores and peaked at No. 1 in charts right away, despite a controversy with an error in the second print run of the album.

=== Live performance ===
The group made their comeback performance on the Korean music show Music Bank with the songs "Shirt" and "Mamacita" on August 29 and kept promotions going on Music Core, Inkigayo and M! Countdown. On September 10, the group did two fan signing events at different locations in Seoul.

=== Super Show 6 ===
Super Junior kicked off their third World Tour on September 19 in Seoul. The tickets for the first dates in their hometown were sold out in just 9 minutes, and the group celebrated their 100th concert on September 21. They also confirmed five stops in Japan as well, in Tokyo Dome and Osaka Dome.

== Critical reception ==
Billboard released an article about Super Junior's new album highlighting the experimental variety of music styles. The website Critical Kpop also named 'Mamacita' a front-runner for album of the year in the 2014's K-Pop industry, praising it as "Every song on Mamacita fits seamlessly together, and more revealing, every song on Mamacita is better for being included together, in this smooth, sophisticated, funky package. Now that's an album". Allkpop also praised the album writing that composers "crafted a pretty masterful piece of work here."

== Commercial performance ==
The album hit the No. 1 spot on Hanteo chart, making it the best selling of the week with more than 65,000 copies sold. It became No. 1 on iTunes in many countries such as HongKong, Philippines, Singapore and Thailand and placed in the Top 10 in many countries such as Japan, Indonesia and México. The album topped Billboard's Album World Chart with just three days of sales, selling 1,000+ copies according to Nielsen SoundScan.

Super Junior also ranked high in other domestic charts in Asia, coming in at No. 1 on KKBOX Weekly chart in Taiwan and Hong Kong, No. 2 on Tower Records chart and No. 3 on Oricon charts, Japan.

== Track listing ==
Mamacita Version A and B track list
No.	Title	Lyrics	Music	Arrangement	Length
1.	"Mamacita" (아야야; Ayaya; lit. 'Ouch')	Yoo Young-jin	Yoo Young-jin; Teddy Riley (Red Rocket); Dominique "DOM" Rodriguez (Red Rocket); Lee Hyun-seung (Red Rocket); Jason J. Lopez	Red Rocket	3:27
2.	"Midnight Blues" (춤을 춘다; Chumeul Chunda; lit. 'Dance')	Shin Jin-hye; Lee Yoo-jin	Jason Gill; Curtis Richardson (WayBetta); Emanuel Olsson	Jason Gill; Curtis Richardson (WayBetta); Emanuel Olsson	4:21
3.	"Evanesce" (백일몽; Baegilmong; lit. 'Daydream')	Misfit	Dominique "DOM" Rodriguez (Red Rocket); Teddy Riley (Red Rocket); Tesung Kim (Iconic Sounds); Andrew Choi	Red Rocket; Tesung Kim (Iconic Sounds); Andrew Choi	3:44
4.	"Raining Spell for Love" (사랑이 멎지 않게; Sarang-i Meotji Ankye; lit. 'Let love never stop')	Jung Ju-hee; Eunhyuk	Teddy Riley (Red Rocket); Dominique "DOM" Rodriguez (Red Rocket); Lee Hyun-seung (Red Rocket); Jason J. Lopez	Red Rocket; Jason J. Lopez	3:22
5.	"Shirt"	Donghae; Hitchhiker (Team One Sound); Young Sky (Team One Sound); Peter Hyun (Team One Sound)	Donghae; Team One Sound	Donghae; Team One Sound	3:28
6.	"This Is Love"	Heechul; Kim Ji-won; Jo Yoon-kyung	Kim Ji-hoo; Park Seul-gi; Lola Fair; Nermin Harambašić	Kim Ji-hoo; Park Seul-gi; Lola Fair; Nermin Harambašić	3:49
7.	"Let's Dance"	Seo Ji-eum	Im Kwang-wook (Devine Channel); Ylva Dimberg (The Kennel); Nermin Harambašić	Hitchhiker; Im Kwang-wook (Devine Channel); Ylva Dimberg (The Kennel); Nermin Harambašić	3:45
8.	"Too Many Beautiful Girls"	Kim In-hyung; Shin Jin-hye; Lee Seu-ran	Chris Young (Chestnut Music Group); Andy Jackson	Chris Young (Chestnut Music Group); Andy Jackson	3:20
9.	"Mid-season" (환절기; Hwanjeolgi; lit. 'Changing seasons')	Eunhyuk; Heechul; Hwang Hyun (MonoTree)	Hwang Hyun (MonoTree)	MonoTree	4:01
10.	"Islands"	Seo Ji-eum; Lee Yoo-jin; Jo Yoon-kyung	Ricky Hanley; Alex Holmgren; Andreas Stone Johansson	Don Spike	4:27
Total length:					37:44

This Is Love special edition track listing
No.	Title	Lyrics	Music	Arrangement	Length
1.	"This Is Love" (stage version)	Heechul; Kim Ji-won; Jo Yoon-kyung	Kim Ji-hoo; Park Seul-gi; Lola Fair; Nermin Harambašić	Kim Ji-hoo; Park Seul-gi; Lola Fair; Nermin Harambašić	4:07
2.	"Hit Me Up"	Lee Chae-yoon	Teddy Riley (Red Rocket); Dominique "DOM" Garcia (Red Rocket); Lee Hyun-seung (Red Rocket); Daniel "Obi" Klein; Andreas "Mage" Maggiani (Devine Channel)	Red Rocket; Daniel "Obi" Klein; Andreas "Mage" Maggiani (Devine Channel)	3:24
3.	"Mamacita" (아야야; Ayaya; lit. 'Ouch')	Yoo Young-jin	Yoo Young-jin; Teddy Riley (Red Rocket); Dominique "DOM" Rodriguez (Red Rocket); Lee Hyun-seung (Red Rocket); Jason J. Lopez	Red Rocket	3:27
4.	"Midnight Blues" (춤을 춘다; Chumeul Chunda; lit. 'Dance')	Shin Jin-hye; Lee Yoo-jin	Jason Gill; Curtis Richardson (WayBetta); Emanuel Olsson	Jason Gill; Curtis Richardson (WayBetta); Emanuel Olsson	4:21
5.	"Don't Leave Me"	Siwon; Bumzu	Siwon; Kim Yong-sin (Iconic Sounds); Joseph "220" Park (Iconic Sounds)	Siwon; Iconic Sounds	3:41
6.	"...ing" (중; Jung) (performed by Super Junior-K.R.Y.)	Park Chang-hyun	Park Chang-hyun	Park Chang-hyun	4:16
7.	"Evanesce" (백일몽; Baegilmong; lit. 'Daydream')	Misfit	Dominique "DOM" Rodriguez (Red Rocket); Teddy Riley (Red Rocket); Tesung Kim (Iconic Sounds); Andrew Choi	Red Rocket; Tesung Kim (Iconic Sounds); Andrew Choi	3:44
8.	"Raining Spell for Love" (사랑이 멎지 않게; Sarang-i Meotji Ankye; lit. 'Let love never stop')	Jung Ju-hee; Eunhyuk	Teddy Riley (Red Rocket); Dominique "DOM" Rodriguez (Red Rocket); Lee Hyun-seung (Red Rocket); Jason J. Lopez	Red Rocket; Jason J. Lopez	3:22
9.	"Shirt"	Donghae; Hitchhiker (Team One Sound); Young Sky (Team One Sound); Peter Hyun (Team One Sound)	Donghae; Team One Sound	Donghae; Team One Sound	3:28
10.	"Let's Dance"	Seo Ji-eum	Im Kwang-wook (Devine Channel); Ylva Dimberg (The Kennel); Nermin Harambašić	Hitchhiker; Im Kwang-wook (Devine Channel); Ylva Dimberg (The Kennel); Nermin Harambašić	3:45
11.	"Too Many Beautiful Girls"	Kim In-hyung; Shin Jin-hye; Lee Seu-ran	Chris Young (Chestnut Music Group); Andy Jackson	Chris Young (Chestnut Music Group); Andy Jackson	3:20
12.	"Mid-season" (환절기; Hwanjeolgi; lit. 'Changing seasons')	Eunhyuk; Heechul; Hwang Hyun (MonoTree)	Hwang Hyun (MonoTree)	MonoTree	4:01
13.	"Islands"	Seo Ji-eum; Lee Yoo-jin; Jo Yoon-kyung	Ricky Hanley; Alex Holmgren; Andreas Stone Johansson	Don Spike	4:27
Total length:					49:23

== Personnel ==
Credit for Mamacita are adapted from the album.

- S.M Entertainment Co., Ltd – Executive Producer
- Soo-man Lee – Producer
- Nam Soo-young – Director of Management
- Jung Chang-hwan – Director of Media Planning
- Lee Song-soo, Kwon Yoon-jung, Yoon Ji-hae – A&R Direction & Coordinator
- Park Hae-in, Kim Dong-hoo, Cho Min-kyung, Lee Seo-kyung – International Repertoire
- Jung Hyo-won, Kim Min-kyung, Oh Jung-eun, Park Mi-ji – Publishing & Copyright Clearance
- Vocal director – Yoo Young-jin
- Super Junior: Leeteuk, Heechul, Yesung, Kangin, Shindong, Sungmin, Eunhyuk, Donghae, Siwon, Ryeowook and Kyuhyun – Vocals, background vocals
- Yoo Young-jin – Recorded at S.M. Boomingsystem
- Goo Joung-pil – Recorded at S.M. Yello Tall Studio
- Kim Chol-Sun – Recorded at S.M. Blue Ocean Studio
- Yoo Young-jin – Mixing (mixing done at S.M. Boomingsystem)
- Nam Koong-jin – Mixing at S.M. Concert Hall Studio
- Goo Jong-pil – Mixing at S.M. Yello Tall Studio
- Kim Cheol-sun – Mixing at S.M. Blue Ocean Studio
- Jang Eui-seok – Mixing at S.M. Blue Cup Studio
- Kim Han-goo – Mixing at Sound Pool Studio
- Jeon Hoon – Mastering (mastering done at Sonic Korea)
- Tak Yeong-jun, Kang Byeong-jun, Wan Young-sun, Kim Min-gun, Kim Si-young, Song In-ho, Park Yeong-suk – Artist Management and Promotion
- Lee Seong-Soo, Yoon Hee-jun, Cho Yoo Eun – Artist Planning & Development
- Kim Eun-ah, Jung Sang-hee, Lee Ji-sun – Public Relations & Publicity
- Kim Min Suk, Park Min-Kwon, Jung Kyung-sik – Media Planning
- Tak Young-jun, Hwang Sung-young, Beat Burger (Joe Sim, Greg Hwang) – Choreography Direction
- Toni Testa, Beat Burger (Joe Sim, Greg Hwang) – Choreographer
- Choi Jung-min – International Marketing
- Steven Myungkyung Lee – English lyrics Supervisor
- Lee Jung-ah – Customer Relationship Management
- Park Jun-young, Sun Young, Jun Sung-jin – Music Video Direction
- Min Hee-jin – Visual & Art Director
- Han Jung-cul – Photographer
- Cho Oh-chul, Yoon Jung-yoon, Kim Yae-min – Design
- Lee Won-hae (want) – Stylist
- Kim Jung-eun, Kim Hye-yun, Yae Won-sang, Kwak Dong-woo – Hair Stylist
- Choi Hye-rin, Han Hyoo-eun, SO Hyun-joo – Make-up Artist
- Young-min Kim – Executive Supervisor

== Charts ==
=== Weekly charts ===
Chart (2014)	Peak position
South Korean Albums (Gaon)	1
Japanese Albums (Oricon)	11
US World Albums (Billboard)	1
US Heatseekers Albums (Billboard)	39

=== Monthly charts ===
Chart (2014)	Peak position
South Korean Albums (Gaon)	1

=== Year-end charts ===
Chart	Position
South Korean Albums (Gaon)	8

== Album sales ==
Gaon Monthly Album Chart, South Korea
Year	Month	Mamacita		This Is Love (Repackaged Edition)		Ref
Year	Month	Sales	Accumulative sales	Sales	Accumulative sales	Ref
2014	September	237,646	237,646	–	–	
2014	October	32,728	270,354	114,216	114,216	
2014	November	–	–	28,644	142,860	
2014	December	–	265,781	655	143,515	
Total		409,296				

== Release history ==
Release history for Mamacita
Country	Date	Format(s)	Label	Edition(s)	Ref
Various	August 29, 2014	Digital download; streaming	SM	Digital	
South Korea	September 1, 2014	CD	SM; KT Music	Version A	
South Korea	September 12, 2014	CD	SM; KT Music	Version B	—
Various	October 23, 2014	Digital download; streaming	SM	This is Love (Special Edition)	
South Korea	October 27, 2014	CD	SM; KT Music	This is Love (Special Edition)	
Taiwan	December 24, 2014	CD; DVD	Avex Taiwan	This is Love (Special Edition)	

== Awards ==
Year	Award	Category	Nominated work	Result	Ref
2014	Golden Disk Awards	Disk Bonsang	Mamacita	Won	
2014	Golden Disk Awards	Disk Daesang	Mamacita	Nominated	
2014	Mnet Asian Music Awards	Album of the Year	Mamacita	Nominated	
2014	Mnet Asian Music Awards	Daesang Award	Mamacita	Nominated	
2014	Gaon Chart K-Pop Awards	Artist of the Year (Album) – 3rd Quarter	Mamacita	Won	
2014	Gaon Chart K-Pop Awards	Artist of the Year (Album) – 4th Quarter	This Is Love	Won	
2014	Hong Kong Top Sales Music Award	Best Sales Releases (Japanese and Korean)	Mamacita	Won	
2014	Hong Kong Top Sales Music Award	Best Sales Releases (Japanese and Korean)	This Is Love	Won	
2016	iF Product Design Award	Discipline packaging	This Is Love	Won	

== Listicles ==
Publisher	Year	Listicle	Nominee/work	Placement	Ref.
Billboard	2019	Top 100 Greatest K-Pop Songs of the 2010s	"This Is Love"	76th	

== See also ==
- Mamacita
  - Mamacita (Music Video) on YouTube
  - Mamacita (Music Video (Drama ver.)) on YouTube
  - Mamacita (Music Video Teaser) on YouTube
  - Mamacita (Music Video Teaser 2) on YouTube
  - Album "MAMACITA" (Highlight Medley) on YouTube
- Music Video Event!!
  - "MAMACITA" (Notification) on YouTube
  - "MAMACITA" (MAMACITA Dance Tutorial) on YouTube
  - "MAMACITA" (SJ T-shirts event) on YouTube
  - "MAMACITA" (High-Five Event) on YouTube
  - "MAMACITA" (Photoshoot Making Film) on YouTube
  - "MAMACITA" (The Message from SJ) on YouTube
  - "MAMACITA" (SJ Behind) on YouTube
  - "MAMACITA" (MV Making Film) on YouTube
- This Is Love x Evanesce
  - This Is Love (Music Video) on YouTube
  - Evanesce (Music Video) on YouTube
  - This Is Love x Evanesce (Music Video Teaser) on YouTube
