= Lee Sung-min (singer) =

South Korean singer and actor (born 1986)

- 이성민
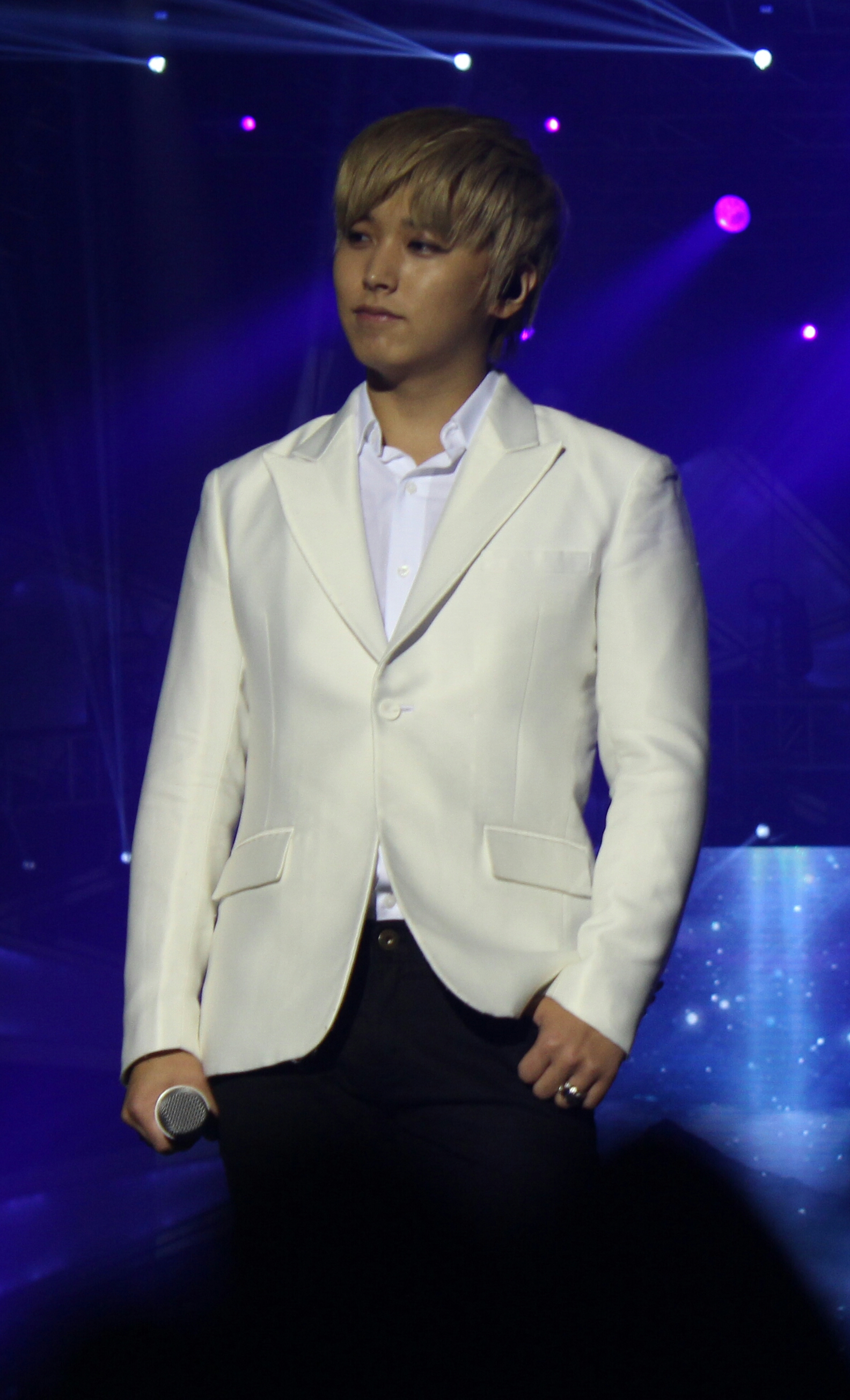
- Sungmin during Super Show 5 in Manila in October 2013
- Born: January 1, 1986 (age 40); Ilsan-gu, Goyang, South Korea
- Education: Myongji University
- Occupations: Singer; actor; songwriter
- Spouse: Kim Sa-eun (m. 2014)
- Children: 1
- Musical career
- Genres: K-pop; Electronic; R&B; Ballad; Trot
- Instrument: Vocals
- Years active: 2005–present
- Labels: SM; Label SJ
- Member of: Super Junior; Super Junior-T; Super Junior-H; Super Junior-M
- Formerly of: SM Town
- Website: Official website

Korean name
- Hangul: 이성민
- Hanja: 李晟敏
- RR: I Seongmin
- MR: I Sŏngmin

YouTube information
- Channel: LIUstudio
- Subscribers: 121K
- Views: 2.3M
- Last updated: September 17, 2025

Signature
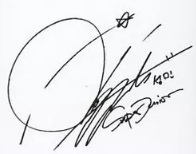

Lee Sung-min (Korean: 이성민; born January 1, 1986), known mononymously as Sungmin and also LIU, is a South Korean singer, songwriter, and actor. He is a member of the South Korean boy band Super Junior and its sub-groups Super Junior-T, Super Junior-H, and Super Junior-M, though he hasn't performed with the group since 2014.

== Early life ==
Sungmin was born in Ilsan District, Goyang, South Korea. He has a younger brother, Lee Sung-jin. Sungmin's father Lee Chun-hwa, is the CEO of two companies: SendBill, which creates e-tax software, and Network Mania, an analytics company.

In 2001, he entered the SM Youth Best Contest and jointly won first place for the Best Outward Appearance award with future bandmate Donghae. Together, they signed a contract with SM Entertainment and received training in singing, dancing, and acting.

== Career ==
=== Pre-debut ===
Sungmin was placed in a project R&B group with Junsu and future bandmate Eunhyuk. In 2002, along with Typhoon, Rose and Attack, the six of them made their first television appearance in a show called Heejun vs. Kangta, Battle of the Century: Pop vs. Rock. Moon Hee-jun taught Typhoon, Rose and Attack on to sing rock while Sungmin, Xiah, and Eunhyuk were taught other singing techniques by Kangta. The six trainees separated a year later, then Typhoon, Rose, and Attack debuted as members of rock band TRAX. The trio separated when Junsu went on to debut as a member of TVXQ. Then Sungmin and Eunhyuk joined ten other trainees to form Super Junior 05, the first generation of rotational boy band Super Junior.

In 2005, he played young Kang Dong-shin in MBC drama Sisters of the Sea.

=== 2005–2009: Debut, acting debut and sub-groups ===
Sungmin debuted as part of 12-member rotational group Super Junior 05 on 6 November 2005, on SBS' music programme Inkigayo, performing their first single, "Twins (Knock Out)". Their debut album SuperJunior05 (Twins) was released a month later on December 5, 2005, and debuted at number three on the monthly MIAK K-pop album charts.

In March 2006, SM Entertainment began to recruit new members for the next Super Junior generation. However, plans changed and the company declared a halt in forming future Super Junior generations. Following the addition of thirteenth member Kyuhyun, the group dropped the suffix "05" and became officially credited as Super Junior. The re-polished group's first CD single "U" was released on 7 June 2006, which was their most successful single until the release of "Sorry, Sorry" in March 2009.

Sungmin guest starred in SBS' Banjun Theatre drama Finding Lost Time and played Yoochun's high school friend.

In February 2007, Sungmin was placed in sub-group trot-singing Super Junior-T. In July, Sungmin participated with fellow Super Junior members in Attack on the Pin-Up Boys, a SM Pictures production. He played the role of a pretty school boy attacked by an unknown criminal. He replaced bandmate Kangin as one of the DJs at Reckless Radio, with Girls' Generation members from June 2007 to July 2008.

In 2008, he became a member of sub-group Super Junior-H and participated in a short half-hour drama Super Junior Unbelievable Story with Leeteuk. Sungmin played himself, a member of Super Junior-T, who is constantly overshadowed by his members.

In 2009, he starred as male lead, Ro, in musical Akilla at the Hanjeon Art Center in Seoul from October 9 to November 8.

=== 2010–2012: DJ, musical theatre, and comeback with Super Junior ===
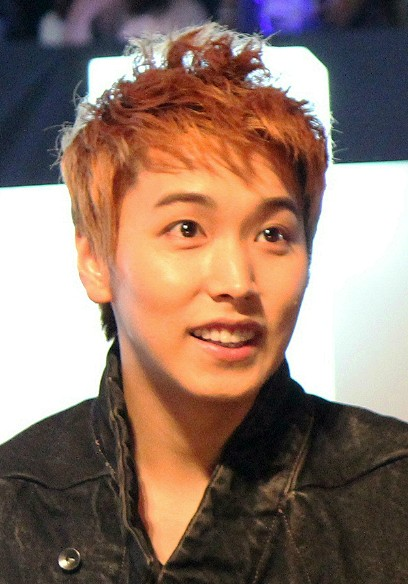
Lee Sung-min at Mnet Asian Music Awards in Singapore, 29 November 2011

In 2010, Sungmin starred in the title role of musical Hong Gil Dong, alongside group mate Yesung who also played the historical figure Hong Gildong. The musical ran at the Woori Financial Art Hall at the Olympic Park from February 18, 2010, for two months.

In October, Sungmin was one of 20 South Korean singers selected to record the theme song, "Let's Go", for the 2010 G-20 Seoul summit. He provided vocals along with labelmates Seohyun, Jonghyun and Luna. In December, he starred in KBS drama The President as Jang Sungmin, the ambitious son of Jang Il Joon the president.

In January 2011, he was placed in Mandopop sub-group Super Junior-M, as one of two new members along with Eunhyuk. They spent the next few months promoting their third EP Perfection in Taiwan and China. In July and August, Sungmin performed as the male lead Daniel, rotating with Ahn Jae-wook, Um Ki-joon, and Lee Ji-hoon, in the musical Jack the Ripper at Chungmu Arts Hall.

In 2012, Sungmin took part in We Got Married's spin-off program with Sistar's Hyorin called "Pit-a-Pat Shake" to air as a Lunar Year special. Sungmin along with bandmate Ryeowook, took over Super Junior's Kiss the Radio, when former DJs Leeteuk and Eunhyuk left due to their busy schedules. On 29 March 2012, Sungmin released his first solo digital single, "Oh Wa", the ending theme song for KBS sitcom, We Need a Fairy.

In September and October 2012, Sungmin reprised his role of Daniel, with Ahn Jae-wook, in the Korean musical Jack the Ripper and held its Japanese tour at Aoyama Theater in Tokyo, Japan. The musical was well-received and, due to its popularity, it was brought back to Japan for another run at the Kanagawa Arts Theatre in Yokohama the following year. Japanese media noted that the impact of the Hallyu Wave in general and specifically the casting of Sungmin helped build popularity for the show in 2012.

2012 was considered a successful year of musicals for Sungmin due to his performance in Jack the Ripper musical, he was ranked by OBS's Unique Entertainment News as the second most powerful musical idol of the year, after Kim Junsu, based on the number of tickets sold.

In June 2012, Sungmin reunited with his Super Junior bandmates for their sixth studio album, Sexy, Free & Single released on July 4. On June 25, his teaser photo was released showing a side-profile of Sungmin with a feminine look and long blond hair holding a large bouquet of baby's breath flowers.

=== 2013–2015: Success in acting and further activities ===
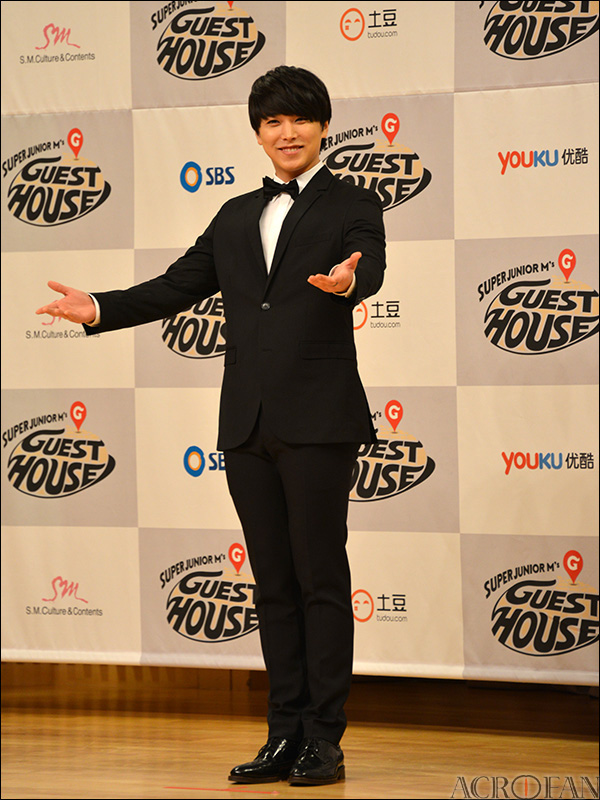
Sungmin in 2014

On January 7, 2013, Super Junior-M released their second album, Break Down, along with the music video for the lead single of the same name. A press conference took place in Beijing on January 7, and they would promote the album in China.

On February 14, 2013, Super Junior's fifth World Tour: Super Show 5 was announced, along with eight active members, excluding Yesung from SS5 Seoul's last date, and Heechul made comeback in SS5 Manilla Sungmin participated in all Super Shows from March 23, 2013, to February 22, 2014. On December 14, 2013, it was announced that Sungmin would be participating in his new Musical "The Three Musketeers" after group member Kyuhyun's last appearance. He worked along with label mate Key from Shinee as the same character d'Artagnan. The first showings of The Three Musketeers ended on January 25, 2013, and returned in March 2014.

Sungmin continued participating in musicals, with a comeback in Summer Snow which was held in Taiwan for three consecutive days. Sungmin held a press conference on the same day as his Summer Snow Musical, which was on January 16, 2014.

After one year and three months since their second album Break Down, Super Junior-M released their third EP, Swing in China on March 21. Previously on March 18, 2014, Super Junior-M had unveiled the teaser image for the EP.
Sungmin returned to another showing of The Three Musketeers Musical just before comeback promotions for Swing, which started on March 14 and ended on March 19.

In February 2014, Sungmin applied to enlist as a Seoul Metropolitan Police, which would make him enlist in August 2014 but he postponed his enlistment date due to his musicals and seventh album comeback plans. On July 1, 2014, it was announced that Sungmin would be acting as the main character in Vampire musical as Dracula. Due to former label-mate Junsu's musical Dracula, the musical title Dracula was renamed to VAMPIRE, as the two musicals were under the same management, but with different plots and casts. On August 5, 2014, Super Junior World Tour Super Show 6 was announced to be held in Seoul on September 21, 2014, as its usual starting tour in Seoul.

Sungmin returned on the musical stage on August 10, 2014, and returned with a comeback as a Super Junior member between Aug–Oct 2014 with their seventh album Mamacita.

Before beginning his mandatory military service on March 31, 2015, he continued to perform in Super Show 6 until the tour's stop in Macau in early March.

=== 2017–2025: Continued solo activities and solo debut ===
After completing his military service and getting discharged at the end of 2016, Sungmin resumed his musical solo activities. In January 2017, it was announced that he had been cast in the musical Boys Over Flowers for his first comeback musical role. The musical was scheduled for showing from February 25 to May 7.

In March 2018, Sungmin released a solo ballad "Day Dream" as the 47th track of 'SM Station' project; this was his first solo track since 2012 with the release of "Oh Wa" as an original soundtrack for the Korean drama "I Need a Fairy."

In January 2018, Lee Sungmin started his own YouTube channel under the SM label, and by February 2018 he took on the name Liu and named his channel Liu Studio. He does a variety of shows, from answering letters sent in by fans to advertising different products he discovers, vlogs, video games and composing music. In March 2018, he introduced his new composed group along with his friend Haeun called "MilkyWave". They have collaborated on several songs together: Toward the Moon, You are You, Seu~Reu~Reu (Zzz), and Make the Earth Move.

In November 2019, Sungmin made his debut with his first mini-album, Orgel, meaning "Music box". The album and title song music video were released on November 22. All five tracks on the album were acoustic tracks. The mini ranked #1 in iTunes top album chart in 11 countries.

In January 2020, Sungmin was featured in the title digital singer "As it is" released by Korean composer Lee Haeun, a song which he also took part in writing and composing.

On September 7, 2021, Sungmin released the digital single "Goodnight, Summer".

On May 10, 2023, Sungmin released his first trot-themed single "Lovesick".

=== 2025–present: Departure from SM ===
Sungmin departed SM Entertainment in April 2025, upon the conclusion of his contract with the company. He had been with SM for over 20 years.

== Personal life ==
=== Marriage and family ===
On September 24, 2014, Sungmin confirmed that he was dating actress Kim Sa-eun. They got married on December 13, 2014, in a private wedding. On July 16, 2024, Lee announced that the couple was expecting their first child after ten years of marriage. The couple welcomed their first child, a son, on September 13, 2024.

=== Military service ===
On March 31, 2015, Sungmin enlisted for his mandatory military service. He was discharged from his military duty on December 30, 2016, after serving 21 months of active duty at the 17th division in Incheon.

== Discography ==
=== Extended plays ===
Title	Details	Peak chart positions	Sales
Title	Details	KOR	Sales
Orgel	Released: November 22, 2019; Label: Label SJ; Formats: CD, digital download, streaming	44	KOR: 6,182

=== Singles ===
Title	Year	Album
"Daydream"	2018	Non-album singles
"Orgel"	2019	Orgel
"Goodnight Summer"	2021	Non-album singles
"Lovesick"	2023	Non-album singles
"Yo.Yo.Yo."	2024	Non-album singles

=== Soundtrack and singles contributions ===
Year	Album	Track	Artist
2007	Student's Cheer Song	"Power"	Sungmin
2008	ROCK&GO	"For Tomorrow"	Sungmin, Moeyan
2008	Sanggeunie's Hope Album	"Now We Go to Meet"	Yesung, Sungmin
2009	The Royal Musical OST	"I Akilla You"	Sungmin
2010	The President OST	"Biting My Lips"	Sungmin, Ryeowook, Kyuhyun
2010	2010 G-20 Seoul summit Theme Song	"Let's Go"	Sungmin, Group of 20 (G20 summit artists)
2012	We Need a Fairy OST	"Oh Wa"	Sungmin
2018	SM Station Season 2	"Day Dream"	Sungmin
2021	Goodnight, Summer	"Goodnight, Summer"	Sungmin
2023	Lovesick	"Lovesick"	Sungmin

=== Songwriting credits ===
All song credits are adapted from the Korea Music Copyright Association's (KOMCA) database unless noted otherwise.

Year	Song	Album	Artist(s)	Lyrics		Music	
Year	Song	Album	Artist(s)	Credit	With	Credit	With
2007	"I Am"	Don't Don	Super Junior	Yes	Lee Dong-hae, Leeteuk, Eunhyuk	No	
2008	"Now We Go to Meet"	Sang-Geun's Wish	Yesung and Sungmin	Yes	Leeteuk	No	
2009	"Love U More"	Sorry, Sorry (Repackage)	Super Junior	Yes	Kim Ryeo-wook	No	
2018	"Please"	The First	Yoo Dong-ju	Yes	Haeun (MilkyWave)	Yes	Haeun (MilkyWave)
2019	"I Pray"	Orgel	Sungmin	Yes	Jo Yoon-kyung, Huang Yun Ren, Jia Wang	No	
2019	"Zzz"	Orgel	Sungmin	Yes	Haeun (MilkyWave)	Yes	Haeun (MilkyWave), Denis Seo
2020	"As It Is Now"	Non-album single	Lim Ha-eun	Yes	Haeun (MilkyWave)	Yes	Haeun (MilkyWave)
2021	"Blooming"	Goodnight, Summer	Sungmin	Yes	Haku	Yes	Haku, Sso

== Filmography ==
=== Film ===
Year	Title	Role
2007	Attack on the Pin-Up Boys	Flower Boy
2010	Super Show 3 3D	Himself
2012	I AM.	Himself
2013	Super Show 4 3D	Himself

=== Television dramas ===
Year	Title	Role	Network
2005	Sisters of the Sea	young Kang Dong-shin	MBC
2005	Charnel House Boy	young baseball player boy	KBS
2006	Finding Lost Time	Yoochun's best friend (cameo)	SBS
2010-11	The President	Jang Sung-min	KBS

=== Television shows ===
Year	Title	Network
2005-06	Hello Chat	Mnet
2006	Show Music Tank	KMTV
2009	Oppa Band	MBC
2011	Celebrity Leading the Way	Dongfeng TV
2021	Taste of Wife	TV Chosun

=== Host ===
Year	Title
2013	7th Daegu International Musical Festival

=== Musical theatre ===
Year	Title	Role
2009	Royal Musical Akilla	Ro
2010	Hong Gildong	Hong Gildong
2011–2013	Jack the Ripper	Daniel
2013–2014	Summer Snow	Jinha
2013–2014	The Three Musketeers	D'Artagnan
2014	Vampire	Drácula
2017	Boys Over Flowers	Hanazawa Rui
2018–2019	At the Age of 30	Hyonshiku

=== Radio shows ===
Year	Name
2007–2008	Chunji Reckless Radio (천방지축 라디오)
2011–2013	Super Junior Kiss the Radio (Sukira)
