= Key discography =

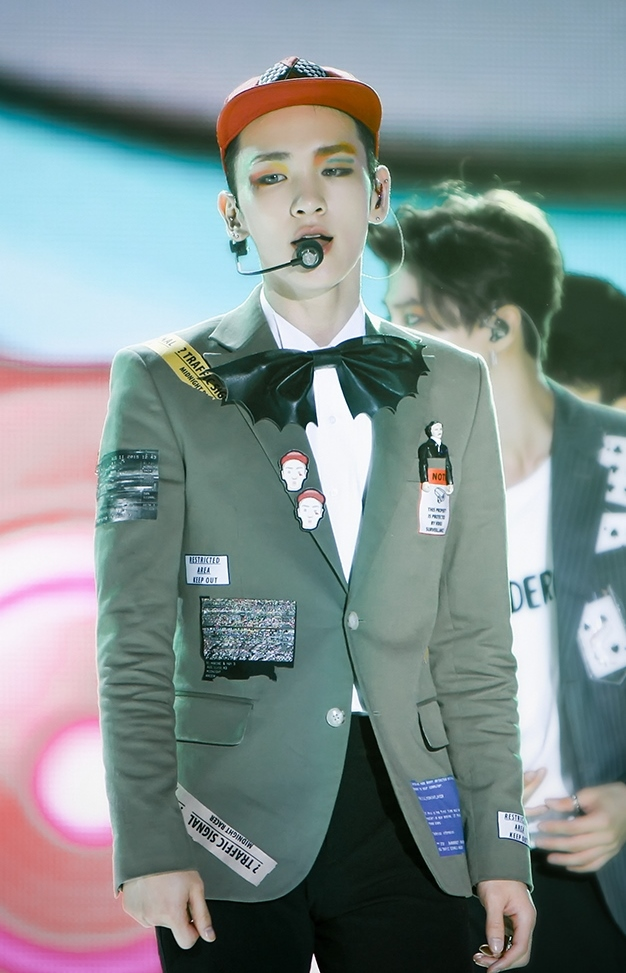
- Key performing at Korea Music Festival in Sokcho, in August 2015
- Studio albums: 3
- EPs: 4
- Soundtrack albums: 1
- Singles: 11
- Reissues: 2
- Collaborations: 4
- Soundtrack appearances: 3
- Music videos: 10

The discography of the South Korean singer Key consists of three studio albums (the first two of which were re-released under a different title), three extended plays, one soundtrack album, fourteen singles (including three as featured artist) and three appearances on soundtracks.

Key made his debut as a solo artist on November 6, 2018, with the release of the single "Forever Yours". He released his first studio album, titled Face, on November 26, 2018, containing 10 songs in total, including the title track "One of Those Nights" and his first single "Forever Yours". On December 26, 2018, he released his first Japanese extended play, titled Hologram, containing a total of five tracks, including a Japanese version of "One of Those Nights". On February 14, 2019, he released the song "Cold" for the Station project. On March 4, Key released the repackaged album I Wanna Be. On September 27, 2021, Key released his first Korean extended play Bad Love. On August 30, 2022, he released his second studio album Gasoline. The album's reissue, Killer, was released on February 13, 2023. Key released his second Korean extended play, Good & Great, on September 11, 2023. He released the Japanese single "Tongue Tied" in June 2024. He released his third Korean extended play, Pleasure Shop, on September 23, 2024. His third studio album, Hunter, was released on August 11, 2025.

== Albums ==
=== Studio albums ===
List of studio albums, with selected details and chart positions
Title	Album details	Peak chart positions					Sales
Title	Album details	KOR	FRA Dig.	JPN	JPN Hot	US World	Sales
Face	Released: November 26, 2018; Label: SM Entertainment; Formats: CD, digital download, streaming	5	195	18	13	9	KOR: 61,805; JPN: 4,543
Gasoline	Released: August 30, 2022; Label: SM Entertainment; Formats: CD, digital download, streaming	1	—N/a	26	24	—	KOR: 132,317; JPN: 2,523
Hunter	Released: August 11, 2025; Label: SM Entertainment; Formats: CD, digital download, streaming	3	—N/a	27	—	—	KOR: 108,845; JPN: 1,949
"—" denotes releases that did not chart or were not released in that region.

=== Reissues ===
List of reissues, with selected chart positions and sales
Title	Album details	Peak chart positions			Sales
Title	Album details	KOR	JPN	JPN Hot	Sales
I Wanna Be	Released: March 4, 2019; Label: SM Entertainment; Formats: CD, digital download, streaming, SMC	3	—	35	KOR: 30,099
Killer	Released: February 13, 2023; Label: SM Entertainment; Formats: CD, digital download, streaming, SMC	6	24	33	KOR: 122,539; JPN: 3,247 (Phy.)
"—" denotes releases that did not chart or were not released in that region.

=== Soundtrack albums ===
List of soundtrack albums
Title	Album details
School Oz – Hologram Musical OST	Released: January 20, 2016; Label: SM Entertainment; Formats: Digital download, streaming; Track listing: 1. "One Day One Chance" (Max, Luna, Suho, Key, Xiumin, Jo Eun); 2. "One Fine Day" (Max, Luna, Suho, Seulgi, Key, Xiumin, Jo Eun); 3. "Mama" (Max, Luna, Suho, Seulgi, Key, Xiumin, Jo Eun); 4. "Genie" (Max, Luna, Suho, Seulgi, Key, Xiumin, Jo Eun); 5. "Intro-Destination" (Max, Luna, Suho, Seulgi, Key, Xiumin, Jo Eun); 6. "Atlantis Princess" (Seulgi); 7. "Pretty Girl" (Luna, Seulgi); 8. "Evil" (Seulgi, Kim Jae Hwa); 9. "Mr. Simple" / "I Got a Boy" (Leeteuk, Luna, Suho, Xiumin, Jo Eun); 10. "Twinkle" (Max, Key); 11. "Evil (Reprise)" (Seulgi, Kim Jae-hwa); 12. "Sherlock (Clue + Note)" (Max, Luna, Suho, Key, Xiumin, Jo Eun); 13. "One Day One Chance (OST Ver.)" (Max, Luna, Suho, Key, Xiumin, Jo Eun); 14. "One Dream" (Max, Luna, Suho, Seulgi, Key, Xiumin, Jo Eun); 15. "One Day One Chance (Reprise)" (Max, Luna, Suho, Seulgi, Key, Xiumin, Jo Eun); 16. "Hope" (Max, Luna, Suho, Seulgi, Key, Xiumin, Jo Eun); 17. "Growl" / "Mirotic" (Max, Lun, Suho, Seulgi, Key, Xiumin, Jo Eun)

== Extended plays ==
List of extended plays, with selected chart positions and sales
Title	Details	Peak chart positions			Sales
Title	Details	KOR	JPN	JPN Hot	Sales
Hologram	Released: December 26, 2018 (JPN); Label: EMI Records Japan, Universal Music Japan; Formats: CD, digital download, streaming	—	4	5	JPN: 26,314 (Phy.)
Bad Love	Released: September 27, 2021 (KOR); Label: SM Entertainment; Formats: CD, digital download, streaming, cassette tape, LP	3	28	16	KOR: 148,486; JPN: 2,400 (Phy.)
Good & Great	Released: September 11, 2023 (KOR); Label: SM Entertainment; Formats: CD, digital download, streaming	4	35	19	KOR: 121,508; JPN: 1,031 (Phy.)
Pleasure Shop	Released: September 23, 2024 (KOR); Label: SM Entertainment; Formats: CD, digital download, streaming	6	21	37	KOR: 130,900; JPN: 2,287
"—" denotes releases that did not chart or were not released in that region.

== Singles ==
=== As lead artist ===
List of singles as lead artist, with selected chart positions, showing year released and album name
Title	Year	Peak chart positions					Sales	Album
Title	Year	KOR	KOR Hot	JPN	JPN Hot	US World	Sales	Album
"Forever Yours" (featuring Soyou)	2018	— (Note: "Forever Yours" did not enter the Gaon Digital Chart, but peaked at number 18 on the Gaon Download Chart.)	—	—	—	14		Face
"One of Those Nights" (센 척 안 해) (featuring Crush)	2018	— (Note: "One of Those Nights" did not enter the Gaon Digital Chart, but peaked at number 17 on the Gaon Download Chart.)	99	—	—	20		Face
"Hologram"	2018	—	—	—	—	—		Hologram
"Cold" (Note: "Cold" was originally released as part of the SM Station project in February 2019, and the following month included on the album I Wanna Be as a bonus track.) (featuring Hanhae)	2019	— (Note: "Cold" did not enter the Gaon Digital Chart, but peaked at number 82 on the Gaon Download Chart.)	—	—	—	—		Non-album single
"I Wanna Be" (featuring Soyeon)	2019	122	—	—	—	13		I Wanna Be
"Hate That..." (featuring Taeyeon)	2021	46	72	—	—	5		Bad Love
"Bad Love"	2021	34	87	—	—	13		Bad Love
"Gasoline"	2022	39	—N/a	—	—	—		Gasoline
"Killer"	2023	58	—N/a	—	—	10		Killer
"Good & Great"	2023	37	—N/a	—	—	—		Good & Great
"Tongue Tied"	2024	—	—N/a	7	55	—	JPN: 20,104	Non-album single
"Pleasure Shop"	2024	2	—N/a	—	—	—		Pleasure Shop
"Hunter"	2025	13	—N/a	—	—	—		Hunter
"—" denotes releases that did not chart or were not released in that region.

=== As featured artist ===
List of singles as featured artist, with selected chart positions and sales, showing year released and album name
Title	Year	Peak chart positions		Sales	Album
Title	Year	KOR	KOR Hot	Sales	Album
"One Dream" (BoA featuring Henry and Key)	2012	34	76	KOR: 170,825	Only One
"Hold On" (Axodus featuring Key)	2015	—	—	—N/a	Non-album release
"If You're Over Me" (Remix) (Years & Years featuring Key)	2018	—	—	—N/a	Palo Santo
"—" denotes releases that did not chart or were not released in that region.

== Collaborations ==
List of collaborations, with selected chart positions, showing year released and album name
Title	Year	Peak chart positions		Album
Title	Year	KOR	US World	Album
"Healing" (치유) (Trax featuring Key)	2010	—	—	Let You Go
"Boys & Girls" (화성인 바이러스) (Girls' Generation featuring Key)	2010	25	—	Oh!
"Barbie Girl" (Jessica featuring Key)	2010	—	—	1st Asia Tour "Into The New World"
"Two Moons" (두 개의 달이 뜨는 밤; 双月之夜) (Exo-K/Exo-M featuring Key)	2012	—	14	Mama
"—" denotes releases that did not chart or were not released in that region.

== Soundtrack appearances ==
List of soundtrack appearances, with selected chart positions, showing year released and album name
Title	Year	Peak chart positions	Album
Title	Year	KOR	Album
"Bravo" (with Leeteuk)	2011	—	History of Salary Man OST Part 2
"Key of Secret"	2016	—	Magic Adventure - The Crystal of Dark OST
"Cool" (with Doyoung)	2016	281	Squad 38 OST Part 2
"—" denotes releases that did not chart or were not released in that region.

== Videography ==
=== Video albums ===
List of video albums, with selected chart positions and notes
Title	Album details	Peak chart positions	Sales
Title	Album details	JPN BD	Sales
Key Concert – G.O.A.T. (Greatest of All Time) in the Keyland Japan	Released: April 26, 2023; Labels: Universal Music Japan; Formats: DVD, Blu-ray	10	JPN: 5,606

=== Music videos ===
List of music videos, showing year released and directors
Title	Year	Director	Ref.
Korean
"Forever Yours" (Feat. Soyou)	2018	Korlio (August Frogs)	
"One of Those Nights" (센 척 안 해) (Feat. Crush)	2018	Lee Junwoo (Salt Film)	
"Cold" (Feat. Hanhae)	2019	Lee Junwoo (Salt Film)	
"I Wanna Be" (Feat. Soyeon of (G)I-dle)	2019	Paranoid Paradigm (VM Project Architecture)	
"Hate That..." (featuring Taeyeon)	2021	Shin Hee-won (ST-WT)	
"Bad Love"	2021	Sam Son (HighQualityFish)	
"Gasoline"	2022	Sam Son (HighQualityFish)	
"Killer"	2023	Yeom Woo-jin	
"Good & Great"	2023	Sam Son (HighQualityFish)	
"Pleasure Shop"	2024	Kim Joo-ae (Rigend Film)	
Japanese
"Tongue Tied"	2024	Lee In-hoon (SEGAJI)	
