= List of songs written by Kenzie =

This list contains songs written by South Korean composer Kenzie, including those where she is credited as co-author.

== Songs ==
Key
‡	Indicates songs solely written by Kenzie

=== 2000s ===
Name of song, featured performers, writer(s), original release, and year of release
Year	Artist	Song	Album	Written with	Ref.
2002	Isak N Jiyeon	"The Sign"	Tell Me Baby	Sole writing ‡	
2003	SMTOWN	"All My True Love"	2003 Summer Vacation in SMTown.com	Sole writing ‡	
2003	SMTOWN	"Hello! Summer!"	2003 Summer Vacation in SMTown.com	Sigurd “Ziggy” Røsnes; Niklas Johansson; Johansson Axelius; Mikael Erik; Jo Yoon-kyung	
2003	SMTOWN	"Snowflake" (Korean: 두번째 겨울)	2003 Summer Vacation in SMTown.com	Sole writing ‡	
2003	Dana	"Maybe"	Maybe	Sole writing ‡	
2003	BoA	"Milky Way"	Atlantis Princess	Sole writing ‡	
2003	BoA	"Time To Begin"	Atlantis Princess	Sole writing ‡	
2004	BoA	"I Kiss"	My Name	Sole writing ‡	
2004	BoA	"My Name"	My Name	Sole writing ‡	
2004	BoA	"Lollipop"	2004 Summer Vacation in SMTown.com	Sole writing ‡	
2004	SMTOWN	"Hotmail" (Korean: 여름편지)	2004 Summer Vacation in SMTown.com	Park Yoo-chun	
2004	TraX	"On the Road"	The Trax	DK4RG (EZLIFE)	
2004	TVXQ	"Like Now" (Korean: 지금처럼)	Tri-Angle	Sole writing ‡	
2004	TVXQ	"Hey, Kid"	Tri-Angle	Yoon Jung; Jeff Franzel; Jon Rydningen; Ken Ingwersen; Marjorie Maye	
2005	TVXQ	"One"	Rising Sun	Sole writing ‡	
2005	TVXQ	"Hi Ya Ya Yeoreumnal"	Hi Ya Ya Yeoreumnal	Emotional Girl	
2005	TVXQ	"I Wanna Hold You"	Show Me Your Love	Sole writing ‡	
2005	TVXQ & Super Junior	"Show Me Your Love"	Show Me Your Love	Sole writing ‡	
2005	Super Junior	"I'm Your Man"	Show Me Your Love	Sole writing ‡	
2005	Super Junior	"You Are the One"	Super Junior '05	Sole writing ‡	
2005	BoA	"Garden In The Air" (Korean: 공중정원)	Girls on Top	Sole writing ‡	
2005	BoA	"Moto"	Girls on Top	BoA	
2005	Ivy	"Do It"	My Sweet and Free Day	Kim Jung-bae	
2005	The Grace	"Can't Help Falling in Love"	Too Good	George David Weiss; Hugo & Luigi	
2005	The Grace	"Too Good"	Too Good	Ingrid Skretting; Ahn Ik-soo	
2005	Jang Woo-hyuk	"F.A.S.T Love"	No More Drama	Seo Jung-hwan	
2006	SMTOWN	"Snow Dream"	06 Winter SM Town – Snow Dream	Yoon Hyo-sang; Svein Finneide; Hwang Sung-jae	
2006	SMTOWN	"Red Sun" (Korean: 태양은 가득히)	06 Winter SM Town – Snow Dream	Sole writing ‡	
2006	Super Junior K.R.Y.	"Just You" (Korean: 그것뿐이에요)	06 Winter SM Town – Snow Dream	Sole writing ‡	
2006	Super Junior	"Smile!"	06 Summer Vacation	Sole writing ‡	
2006	TVXQ	"Oasis"	06 Winter SM Town – Snow Dream	Sole writing ‡	
2006	TVXQ	"When We'll Be Together" (Korean: 내가 그대없이)	06 Winter SM Town – Snow Dream	Sole writing ‡	
2006	TVXQ	"Balloon"	"O"-Jung.Ban.Hap.	Lee Doo-heon; Kim Sung-ho	
2006	TVXQ	"Phantom" (Korean: 환영; Hanja: 幻影)	"O"-Jung.Ban.Hap.	Kim Jung-bae	
2006	TVXQ	"Remember"	"O"-Jung.Ban.Hap.	Kim Jung-bae	
2006	BoA	"Dotch"	Key of Heart/ Dotch	Watanabe Natsumi	
2006	BoA	"People Say.." (Korean: 슬픔은 넘쳐도)	Everlasting	Sole writing ‡	
2006	Seo Hyun-jin	"Give Me a Little Try"	Princess Hours OST	Kim Jung-bae	
2006	Zhang Liyin	"Timeless"	I Will	Anders Bagge; Peer Åström; Oscar Merner; Karen Poole; Henrik Norberg	
2007	The Grace	"One More Time, OK?" (Korean: 한번 더, OK?)	One More Time, OK?	Sole writing ‡	
2007	The Grace	"Sweet Emotion"	One More Time, OK?	Kim Jung-bae	
2007	TraxX	"Cold Rain" (Korean: 초우)	Cold Rain	H U B	
2007	TVXQ	"Harudal" (Korean: 하루달)	Air City OST	Kim Jung-bae	
2007	Girls' Generation	"Perfect for You"	Into the New World	Ingrid Skretting; Kwon Yun-jeong	
2007	Girls' Generation	"Into The New World"	Girls' Generation	Kim Jung-bae	
2007	Girls' Generation	"Girls' Generation"	Girls' Generation	Lee Seung-chul; Song Jae-joon	
2007	Girls' Generation	"Merry-Go Round"	Girls' Generation	Kim Jung-bae	
2007	Girls' Generation	"Tinkerbell"	Girls' Generation	Jo Yoon-kyung; Ingrid Skretting	
2007	Girls' Generation	"Honey" (소원; Sowon; lit. Wish) (Perfect for You)	Girls' Generation	Won Yoon-jung; Ingrid Skretting	
2007	Super Junior	"Hate U, Love U" (Korean: 미워)	Don't Don	Kim Jung-bae	
2007	Super Junior	"The Girl is Mine" (Korean: 마지막 승부)	Don't Don	Kim Jung-bae	
2007	Super Junior	"I Am"	Don't Don	Sungmin; Donghae; Eunhyuk; Leeteuk; Greg Lynch	
2007	Super Junior	"Our Love" (우리들의 사랑; Urideul-ui Sarang)	Don't Don	Yoo Jae-ha	
2007	Super Junior	"Full of Happiness"	2007 Summer SMTOWN - Fragile	Jang Yong-jin; Hwang Sung-jae; Lee Ju-hyung; Jang Woo-hyuk; Lee Jae-won	
2007	Super Junior	"Chonnuni Wa" (Korean: 첫눈이 와)	2007 Winter SM Town – Only Love	Sole writing ‡	
2007	BoA	"On December 27th" (Korean: 12월 27일)	2007 Winter SM Town – Only Love	BoA	
2008	Girls' Generation	"Haptic Motion"	—N/a	Sole writing ‡	
2008	Shinee	"Graze" (Korean: 화장을 하고)	The Shinee World	Kim Jung-bae	
2008	Shinee	"Y Si Fuera Ella" (Jonghyun solo)	The Shinee World	Alejandro Sanz	
2008	Shinee	"Real"	Replay	Kim Jung-bae	
2008	Super Junior-H	"Sunny" (Korean: 꿀단지)	Cooking? Cooking!	Kim Jung-bae	
2008	TVXQ	"Rainbow" (Korean: 무지개)	Mirotic	Kim Jung-bae	
2008	Super Junior-M	"Me" (迷)	Me	Sole writing ‡	
2009	f(x)	"La Cha Ta"	Hot Summer	Sole writing ‡	
2009	Girls' Generation	"Way to Go!"	Gee	Kim Jung-bae	
2009	Girls' Generation	"Girlfriend" (Korean: 여자친구)	Genie	Kim Jung-bae	
2009	Girls' Generation	HaHaHa	—N/a	Sole writing ‡	
2009	Shinee	"Señorita" (Korean: 세뇨리따)	Romeo	Kim Jung-bae	
2009	Shinee	"Jojo"	2009, Year of Us	Sole writing ‡	
2009	Super Junior	"Angela" (Korean: 앤젤라)	Sorry, Sorry	Kim Jung-bae	
2009	Super Junior	"Monster"	Sorry, Sorry	Remee; Tim Kellett; Robin Anthony; Peter Biker; Robin Taylor-Firth	
2009	Super Junior	"Love U More" (첫번째 이야기; Cheotbeonjjae Iyagi)	Sorry, Sorry	Ryeowook; Sungmin	
2009	Super Junior	"What If"	Sorry, Sorry	Sean Hosein; Dane DeViller; Jörgen Elofsson; Kwon Yoon-jung; Andy Goldmark; Ferdie Marquez	
2009	Super Junior-M	"Only U" (動情)	Super Girl	Karen Poole; Greg Kurstin	
2009	Super Junior & Girls' Generation	"Seoul"	—N/a	Lee Jae-myung	

=== 2010s ===
Name of song, featured performers, writer(s), original release, and year of release
Year	Artist	Song	Album	Written with	Ref.
2010	BoA	"Hurricane Venus"	Hurricane Venus	BoA; Hong Ji-yu; Erik Lidbom; Anne Judith Wik; Martin Hansen	
2010	BoA	"M.E.P (My Electronic Piano)"	Hurricane Venus	Kim Jung-bae	
2010	BoA	"Copy & Paste"	Copy & Paste	Kang Ji-won; Kim Bu-min; Jens Gad; Lamenga Kafi; Erik Lewander	
2010	f(x)	"Mr. Boogie"	Nu ABO	Fredrik Fencke; Emilh Tigerlantz	
2010	Girls' Generation	"Oh!"	Oh!	Kim Jung-bae	
2010	Girls' Generation	"Mistake"	Hoot	Kwon Yu-ri; Cheryl Yie; Jean Na	
2010	Shinee	"Life"	Lucifer	Kim Jung-bae	
2010	Super Junior	"Your Eyes" (Korean: 나란 사람)	Bonamana	Kim Jung-bae	
2010	Super Junior	"Boom Boom"	Bonamana	Eunhyuk; Hayden Bell; Wayne Beckford; Ray Lavender	
2010	Super Junior	"My Only Girl"	Bonamana	Brandon Fraley; Hannah Welton; Joshua Welton; Yoo Han-jin	
2010	Super Junior	"In My Dreams"	Bonamana	Kwon Yoon-jung; Kim Ji-hoo	
2010	Super Junior	"Good Person"	Bonamana	You Hee-yeol	
2010	Super Junior	"No Other"	Bonamana	iDR (C2); 12Keyz (C2); Ryan S. Jhun; Reefa; Tesung Kim (Iconic Sound)	
2011	f(x)	"Pinocchio (Danger)"	Pinocchio	Misfit; Dwight Watson; Jeff Hoeppner; Alex Cantrall; Hitchhiker	
2011	f(x)	"Dangerous"	Pinocchio	Nermin Harambašić; Robin Jenssen; Ronny Svendsen; Anne Judith Wik	
2011	f(x)	"Hot Summer"	Hot Summer	Thomas Troelsen; Mikkel Remee Sigvardt	
2011	The Grace	"One More Chance" (Korean: 나 좀 봐줘)	—N/a	Sole writing ‡	
2011	Girls' Generation	"Oscar"	The Boys	Kim Jung-bae	
2011	Girls' Generation	"Diamond"	2011 Winter SM Town – The Warmest Gift	Sole writing ‡	
2011	Super Junior	"A Day" (Korean: 하루에)	A-Cha	Kim Jung-bae	
2011	Super Junior	"Opera"	Mr. Simple	Thomas Troelsen; Engelina Larsen	
2011	Super Junior	"Storm" (Korean: 폭풍)	Mr. Simple	Kim Jung-bae	
2011	Shinee	"Stranger" (Japanese version)	The First	Natsumi Kobayashi; Choi Min-ho	
2011	TVXQ	"She"	Before U Go	Sole writing ‡	
2012	TVXQ	"Gorgeous"	Catch Me	Kim Jung-bae; Andrew Choi	
2012	TVXQ	"Like A Soap"	Catch Me	Kim Jung-bae	
2012	TVXQ	"Viva"	Catch Me	Sole writing ‡	
2012	TVXQ	"Humanoids"	Humanoids	Lee Kyung-nam; Lee Sol-bi; Thomas Troelsen	
2012	BoA	"The Shadow"	Only One	BoA	
2012	Girls' Generation-TTS	"OMG (Oh My God)"	Twinkle	Kim Jung-bae	
2012	Jessica & Krystal	"Butterfly"	To the Beautiful You OST	Matthew Tishler; Andrew Ang; Susan Markle	
2012	Taeyeon	"Closer"	To the Beautiful You OST	Kim Jung-bae	
2012	f(x)	"Jet"	Electric Shock	Sole writing ‡	
2012	Shinee	"Stranger" (Korean: 낯선자)	Sherlock	Kim Jung-bae; Choi Min-ho	
2012	Super Junior	"Bittersweet" (Korean: 달콤씁쓸)	Sexy, Free & Single	Kim Jung-bae	
2012	Super Junior	"Spy"	Sexy, Free & Single	Thomas Troelsen; Mikkel Remee Sigvardt; Irving Szathmary; Hwang Hyun (MonoTree); Yoo Han-jin	
2012	Super Junior	"Outsider"	Sexy, Free & Single	Eunhyuk; Herbert St. Clair Crichlow; Adam Pallin; Thomas Troelsen	
2013	Exo	"Wolf"	XOXO	Will Simms; Nermin Harambašić	
2013	Exo	"Baby"	XOXO	Kim Jung-bae	
2013	Exo	"The First Snow"	Miracles in December	Kim Jung-bae	
2013	f(x)	"Signal"	Pink Tape	Sole writing ‡	
2013	Girls' Generation	"Dancing Queen"	I Got A Boy	Duffy; Yoon Hyo-sang; Jessica; Tiffany Young; Steve Booker	
2013	Girls' Generation	"Express 999"	I Got A Boy	Kim Jung-bae	
2013	Shinee	"Why So Serious?"	Why So Serious?	Kim Jung-bae	
2013	Shinee	"Evil"	Why So Serious?	Fridolin Nordsø; Frederik Nordsø	
2013	Shinee	"Green Rain"	The Queen's Classroom OST	Sole writing ‡	
2013	Shinee	"Queen of New York"	Everybody	Kim Jeong-bae; Andrew Choi	
2014	Chen	"Up RIsing"	Exology Chapter 1: The Lost Planet	Sole writing ‡	
2014	Exo-K	"Overdose"	Overdose	Jeon Ji-eun; Hwang Seon-jeong; Kim Jeong-mi; Harvey Mason Jr. Damon Thomas; Chaz Jackson; Orlando Williamson; Britt Burton; Rodnae "Chikk" Bell	
2014	f(x)	"Milk"	Red Light	Lee Hyun-seung; Teddy Riley; DOM; Engelina Larsen	
2014	f(x)	"Red Light"	Red Light	Bryan Jarett; Daniel Ullmann; Maegan Cottone; Allison Kaplan; Sherry St. Germain	
2014	f(x)	"Vacance"	Red Light	Sole writing ‡	
2014	Girls' Generation	"Europa"	Mr.Mr.	Sole writing ‡	
2014	Henry	"Need You Now"	Fantastic	Sole writing ‡	
2014	Henry	"Fantastic"	Fantastic	Will Simms	
2014	J-Min	"My Everyday"	Shine	Sole writing ‡	
2014	Kyuhyun	"At Gwanghwamun"	At Gwanghwamun	Sole writing ‡	
2014	Kyuhyun	"Flying, Deep in the Night"	At Gwanghwamun	Lee Young-hoon	
2014	Super Junior	"Lunar Eclipse"	—N/a	Hidenori Tanaka	
2014	Taemin	"Wicked"	Ace	DOM; Lee Hyeon-seung; Teddy Riley; Mage	
2014	TVXQ	"Your Man"	Tense	Kim Jung-bae	
2015	Exo	"Sing for You"	Sing for You	Matthew Tishler; Felicia Barton; Aaron Benward	
2015	Exo	"Transformer"	Exodus	Jonathan Yip; Jeremy Reeves; Ray Romulus; Ray McCullough	
2015	f(x)	"Cash Me Out"	4 Walls	David Dawood; Mark Pellizzer; Makeba Riddick	
2015	f(x)	"Papi"	4 Walls	Greg Bonnick; Hayden Chapman; Shaun; Ylva Dimberg	
2015	Girls' Generation	"Fire Alarm"	Lion Heart	Johan Gustafson; Fredrik Häggstam; Sebastian Lundberg	
2015	Kyuhyun	"A Million Pieces"	Fall, Once Again	Sole writing ‡	
2015	Max Changmin	"Rise as One"	Rise as God	VACK; KooKing; Flash Finger; AFSHEEN; Josh Cumbee; Toby Gad	
2015	Red Velvet	"Something Kinda Crazy"	Ice Cream Cake	Lee Hyeon-seung; Teddy Riley; DOM; Charli Taft	
2015	Red Velvet	"Huff n Puff"	The Red	Alex Ganne Preven; Will Gray; Jaden Michaels	
2015	Red Velvet	"Lady's Room"	The Red	Daniel "Obi" Klein; Oliver McEwan; Ylva Dimberg	
2015	Shinee	"Love Sick"	Odd	Harvey Mason Jr. Damon Thomas; Mike Daley; Dewain Whitmore Jr.	
2015	Shinee	"Trigger"	Odd	Deez; Rodnae "Chikk" Bell	
2015	Shinee	"Love"	Your Number	Sara Sakurai	
2015	Shinee	"Savior"	Married To The Music	Zak Waters; Alexander DeLeon	
2015	Super Junior	"Devil"	Devil	Jonathan Yip; Ray Romulus; Jeremy Reeves; Raymond Charles II; Micah Powell	
2015	Super Junior	"Good Love"	Devil	Jonathan Yip; Ray Romulus; Jeremy Reeves; Raymond Charles II; Micah Powell	
2016	Amber & Luna (feat. Ferry Corsten & Kago Pengchi)	"Heartbeat"	SM Station Season 1	Ko Chung-won; Phoebe Sharp; Wright Todd Edgar; Ferry Corsten	
2016	Exo	"For Life"	For Life	Matthew Tishler; Aaron Benward	
2016	Exo	"Monster"	Ex'Act	Deepflow; Greg Bonnick; Hayden Chapman; Rodnae "Chikk" Bell	
2016	Exo-CBX	"Rhythm After Summer"	Hey Mama!	Joseph "Joe Millionaire" Foster; Kameron "Grae" Alexander; MZMC; Otha "Vakseen" Davis III	
2016	J-Min	"Ready for Your Love"	Ready for Your Love	Sole writing ‡	
2016	Kangta	"If I Told Ya"	Home - Chapter 1	Andreas Öberg; Simon Petrén; Gustav Karlström	
2016	NCT Dream	"Chewing Gum"	—N/a	Mark Lee; Moon Seol-ri; Jeong Min-ji; Jo Yoon-kyung; Troelsen Thomas	
2016	Red Velvet	"Cool Hot Sweet Love"	The Velvet	Daniel "Obi" Klein; Charli Taft; Michael Nordmark; Thomas Sardorf	
2016	Red Velvet	"First Time"	The Velvet	Sole writing ‡	
2016	Red Velvet	"Lucky Girl"	Russian Roulette	Hayley Aitken; Ollipop	
2016	Red Velvet	"Some Love"	Russian Roulette	Sole writing ‡	
2016	Shinee	"Rescue"	1 and 1	Harvey Mason Jr. Mike Daley; Dewain Whitmore Jr.	
2016	Shinee	"Shift"	1 of 1	Greg Bonnick; Hayden Chapman; Adrian McKinnon	
2016	Seulgi & Kim Jae-hwa	"Evil"	School OZ - Hologram Musical (Original Soundtrack)	Fridolin Nordsø; Frederik Nordsø	
2016	Seulgi & Kim Jae-hwa	"Evil (Reprise)"	School OZ - Hologram Musical (Original Soundtrack)	Fridolin Nordsø; Frederik Nordsø	
2016	Taemin	"Sexuality"	Press It	Jodi Marr; Eric Bazilian; Ryan S. Jhun	
2016	Kim Bum-soo	"Pain Poem"	SM Station Season 1	Sole writing ‡	
2016	Yoon Mi-rae	"Because of You"	SM Station Season 1	Matthew Tishler; Aaron Benward; Felicia Barton; Park In-young	
2016	Zhoumi	"What's Your Number?"	What's Your Number?	Christian Fast; Didrik Thott; Henrik Nordenback	
2017	BoA	"Spring Rain"	SM Station Season 2	Sole writing ‡	
2017	D.O	"For Life" (English Version)	Exo Planet #4 - The Elyxion [dot]	Sole writing ‡	
2017	Exo	"Forever"	The War	Greg Bonnick; Hayden Chapman; Adrian McKinnon	
2017	Exo	"What U Do?"	The War	Ronny Vidar Svendsen; Justin Stein	
2017	Gain	"Kiss or Kill"	Missing 9 OST	Sole writing ‡	
2017	Onestar & Kenzie	"Mr. Seo (Vocal Version)"	Missing 9 OST	Nile Lee	
2017	Kenzie & Nile Lee	"Blue Water"	Missing 9 OST	Nile Lee	
2017	Kenzie & Nile Lee	"Sunday"	Missing 9 OST	Nile Lee	
2017	Kenzie & Nile Lee	"Rule the Island"	Missing 9 OST	Nile Lee	
2017	Kenzie & Nile Lee	"Mr. Seo (Recorder Version)"	Missing 9 OST	Nile Lee	
2017	Kenzie & Nile Lee	"Bonghee"	Missing 9 OST	Nile Lee	
2017	Kenzie & Nile Lee	"Remember"	Missing 9 OST	Nile Lee	
2017	Kenzie & Nile Lee	"What's Next?"	Missing 9 OST	Nile Lee	
2017	Kenzie & Nile Lee	"Can't Hate"	Missing 9 OST	Nile Lee	
2017	Kenzie & Nile Lee	"Evil Comes Home"	Missing 9 OST	Nile Lee	
2017	Kenzie & Nile Lee	"Sunday"	Missing 9 OST	Nile Lee	
2017	Kenzie & Nile Lee	"Missing 9"	Missing 9 OST	Nile Lee	
2017	Kenzie & Nile Lee	"Midnight of Waltz"	Missing 9 OST	Nile Lee	
2017	Kenzie & Nile Lee	"There Will Be"	Missing 9 OST	Nile Lee	
2017	Kenzie & Nile Lee	"Play Me"	Missing 9 OST	Nile Lee	
2017	Kenzie & Nile Lee	"Sterling (Opening Title)"	Missing 9 OST	Nile Lee	
2017	Kenzie & Nile Lee	"Deep Wave"	Missing 9 OST	Nile Lee	
2017	Kenzie & Nile Lee	"Tima"	Missing 9 OST	Nile Lee	
2017	Kenzie & Nile Lee	"Nine Tears"	Missing 9 OST	Nile Lee	
2017	Girls' Generation	"All Night"	Holiday Night	Ollipop; Daniel Caesar; Ludwig Lindell; Hayley Aitken	
2017	Girls' Generation	"Fan"	Holiday Night	Sole writing ‡	
2017	Girls' Generation	"Light Up The Sky"	Holiday Night	Erik Lidbom	
2017	Namie Amuro	"Strike A Pose"	—N/a	Tiger; Lasse Lindorff; Fridolin Nordsoe Schjoldan	
2017	NCT 127	"Limitless"	Limitless	Harvey Mason Jr. Kevin Randolph; Patrick "J. Que" Smith; Britt Burton; Dewain Whitmore Jr. Andrew Hey	
2017	NCT Dream	"We Young"	We Young	Greg Bonnick; Hayden Chapman; Ylva Dimberg	
2017	Red Velvet	"Attaboy"	Perfect Velvet	The Stereotypes; Ylva Dimberg	
2017	Red Velvet	"Peek-a-Boo"	Perfect Velvet	Jonatan Gusmark; Ludvig Evers; Cazzi Opeia; Ellen Berg	
2017	Red Velvet	"Red Flavor"	The Red Summer	Daniel Caesar; Ludwig Lindell	
2017	Seohyun	"Don't Say No"	Don't Say No	Matthew Tishler; Felicia Barton	
2017	Taeyeon	"I Got Love"	My Voice	Thomas Troelsen; Eyelar	
2017	Taeyeon	"Lonely Night"	My Voice	Sole writing ‡	
2017	Taeyeon	"Sweet Love"	My Voice	The Stereotypes; Racquelle "Rahky" Anteola	
2018	BoA	"Good Love"	Woman	Jamil "Digi" Chammas; Adrian McKinnon; MZMC	
2018	Exo	"24/7"	Don't Mess Up My Tempo	Harvey Mason Jr. The Wavys; The Wildcardz; Aaron Berton; Andrew Hey	
2018	Exo-CBX	"Playdate"	Blooming Days	Andreas Öberg; Yoo Young-jin; Martin Kleveland; Ilanguaq Lumholt	
2018	Fairies	"Fashionable"	Jukebox	Sole writing ‡	
2018	Hyolyn	"Spring Watch"	Black Knight: The Man Who Guards Me OST	Nile Lee	
2018	Kwon Sun-il	"Daydream"	Black Knight: The Man Who Guards Me OST	Nile Lee	
2018	Kenzie & Nile Lee	"Antique Garden"	Black Knight: The Man Who Guards Me OST	Nile Lee	
2018	Kenzie & Nile Lee	"Guard"	Black Knight: The Man Who Guards Me OST	Nile Lee	
2018	Kenzie & Nile Lee	"Black Knight"	Black Knight: The Man Who Guards Me OST	Nile Lee	
2018	Kenzie & Nile Lee	"White Castle"	Black Knight: The Man Who Guards Me OST	Nile Lee	
2018	Kenzie & Nile Lee	"Sharon's Room"	Black Knight: The Man Who Guards Me OST	Nile Lee	
2018	Kenzie & Nile Lee	"Imperial"	Black Knight: The Man Who Guards Me OST	Nile Lee	
2018	Kenzie & Nile Lee	"The Person"	Black Knight: The Man Who Guards Me OST	Nile Lee	
2018	Kenzie & Nile Lee	"Jade"	Black Knight: The Man Who Guards Me OST	Nile Lee	
2018	Kenzie & Nile Lee	"Breeze"	Black Knight: The Man Who Guards Me OST	Nile Lee	
2018	Kenzie & Nile Lee	"Tear Drop"	Black Knight: The Man Who Guards Me OST	Nile Lee	
2018	Kenzie & Nile Lee	"Moon Walking"	Black Knight: The Man Who Guards Me OST	Nile Lee	
2018	Kenzie & Nile Lee	"Green Light"	Black Knight: The Man Who Guards Me OST	Nile Lee	
2018	Kenzie & Nile Lee	"Silica"	Black Knight: The Man Who Guards Me OST	Nile Lee	
2018	Kenzie & Nile Lee	"Mirage"	Black Knight: The Man Who Guards Me OST	Nile Lee	
2018	Kenzie & Nile Lee	"Karna"	Black Knight: The Man Who Guards Me OST	Nile Lee	
2018	Kenzie & Nile Lee	"Mutation"	Black Knight: The Man Who Guards Me OST	Nile Lee	
2018	Kenzie & Nile Lee	"Mean Time"	Black Knight: The Man Who Guards Me OST	Nile Lee	
2018	Kenzie & Nile Lee	"Punch"	Black Knight: The Man Who Guards Me OST	Nile Lee	
2018	Key	"One of Those Nights"	Face	Noah Conrad; Jake Torrey; Riley Thomas Donnell; Daniel Doran Henig; Adrian McKinnon	
2018	Nature	"Allegro Cantabile"	Girls and Flowers	Suemitsu Atsushi; Seo Jeong-heun; Yong Seong-ji	
2018	NCT Dream	"We Go Up"	We Go Up	Mark Lee; MZMC; Andrew Bazzi; Mike Woods; Kevin White	
2018	Onew	"Blue"	Voice	Rocoberry	
2018	Red Velvet	"Mr. E"	Summer Magic	Sebastian Lundberg; Fredrik Häggstam; Johan Gustafsson; Courtney Woolsey	
2018	Red Velvet	"Power Up"	Summer Magic	Jonatan Gusmark; Ludvig Evers; Cazzi Opeia; Ellen Berg	
2018	Red Velvet	"Really Bad Boy (RBB)"	RBB	Timothy "BOS" Bullock; Sara Forsberg; MZMC	
2018	Red Velvet	"Sassy Me"	RBB	Jonatan Gusmark; Ludvig Evers; Anne Judith Wik	
2018	Shinee	"All Day All Night"	The Story of Light	Delly Boi; Davey Nate; Peter Tambakis	
2018	Shinee	"Our Page"	The Story of Light	Onew; Lee Tae-min; Key; Choi Min-ho; Mike Woods; Kevin White; Andrew Bazzi; MZMC; Yoo Young-jin	
2018	Sunny & Henry	"U&I"	SM Station Season 2	Gen Neo; Andreas Öberg; Charli Taft; Daniel "Obi" Klein; Henry Lau; Sunny	
2018	Super Junior & Leslie Grace	"Lo Siento"	Replay	Heechul; Eunhyuk; Mario Caceres; Yasmil Marrufo; Leslie Grace; Daniel "Obi" Klein; Charli Taft; Andreas Öberg; Juan "Play" Salinas; Oscar "Skillz" Salinas	
2018	Taeyeon	"All Night Long" (feat. Lucas)	Something New	Michael Woods; Kevin White; MZMC; Yinette Claudette Mendez	
2018	TVXQ	"Sooner than Later"	New Chapter #2: The Truth of Love	The Quiett; Digi; Micahfonecheck; Styalz Fuego; James Patterson; Ben Ruttner; MZMC	
2019	Baekhyun	"Betcha"	City Lights	The Stereotypes; August Rigo	
2019	BoA	"Think About You"	Starry Night	Sophia Ayana; Caesar & Loui	
2019	Chen	"Love Words"	April, and a flower	Sole writing ‡	
2019	Chen	"Shall We?"	Dear My Dear	Sole writing ‡	
2019	CIX	"Like It That Way"	Hello Chapter 1: Hello, Stranger	JQ; Amelie; Andrew Bazzi; Anthony Russo; Mike Woods; Kevin White; MCMZ; Jay Kim	
2019	Exo	"Obsession"	Obsession	Dem Jointz; Cristi "Stalone" Gallo; Asia'h Epperson; Adrian McKinnon; Yoo Young-jin; Ryan S. Jhun	
2019	Exo	"Ya Ya Ya"	Obsession	Dem Jointz; Ryan S. Jhun; David Brown; Charles "Prince Charlez" Hinshaw; Allen "Allstar" Gordon Jr. Cheryl Gamble; Tamara Johnson; Andrea Martin; Ivan Matias	
2019	Kenzie & Nile Lee	"Two Rocks"	My Lawyer, Mr. Jo 2: Crime and Punishment OST	Nile Lee	
2019	Kenzie & Nile Lee	"Aggression"	My Lawyer, Mr. Jo 2: Crime and Punishment OST	Nile Lee	
2019	Kenzie & Nile Lee	"Why Me"	My Lawyer, Mr. Jo 2: Crime and Punishment OST	Nile Lee	
2019	Kenzie & Nile Lee	"Cowboy Jo"	My Lawyer, Mr. Jo 2: Crime and Punishment OST	Nile Lee	
2019	Kenzie & Nile Lee	"Long River"	My Lawyer, Mr. Jo 2: Crime and Punishment OST	Nile Lee	
2019	Kenzie & Nile Lee	"Mercury"	My Lawyer, Mr. Jo 2: Crime and Punishment OST	Nile Lee	
2019	Kenzie & Nile Lee	"Lotus"	My Lawyer, Mr. Jo 2: Crime and Punishment OST	Nile Lee	
2019	Kenzie & Nile Lee	"Peppers"	My Lawyer, Mr. Jo 2: Crime and Punishment OST	Nile Lee	
2019	Kenzie & Nile Lee	"Not the End"	My Lawyer, Mr. Jo 2: Crime and Punishment OST	Nile Lee	
2019	Kenzie & Nile Lee	"Shufal"	My Lawyer, Mr. Jo 2: Crime and Punishment OST	Nile Lee	
2019	Kenzie & Nile Lee	"Manic Mood"	My Lawyer, Mr. Jo 2: Crime and Punishment OST	Nile Lee	
2019	Kenzie & Nile Lee	"Ella"	My Lawyer, Mr. Jo 2: Crime and Punishment OST	Nile Lee	
2019	Kenzie & Nile Lee	"Follow Me"	My Lawyer, Mr. Jo 2: Crime and Punishment OST	Nile Lee	
2019	Kenzie & Nile Lee	"The Queen's Waltz"	My Lawyer, Mr. Jo 2: Crime and Punishment OST	Nile Lee	
2019	Kenzie & Nile Lee	"She's Gonna Kill All"	My Lawyer, Mr. Jo 2: Crime and Punishment OST	Nile Lee	
2019	Red Velvet	"Carpool"	The ReVe Festival: Day 2	Sophia Ayana; Nathan Cunningham; Marc Sibley; Palm Trees	
2019	Red Velvet	"Jumpin'"	The ReVe Festival: Day 2	Ylva Dimberg; Ludwig Lindell; Daniel Caesar	
2019	Red Velvet	"In & Out"	The ReVe Festival: Finale	Jonatan Gusmark (Moonshine); Ludvig Evers (Moonshine); Cazzi Opeia	
2019	Red Velvet	"Psycho"	The ReVe Festival: Finale	Andrew "Druski" Scott; Cazzi Opeia; EJAE	
2019	SuperM	"I Can't Stand the Rain"	SuperM	Thomas Troelsen; Sam Martin	
2019	SuperM	"Let's Go Everywhere"	—N/a	Sole writing ‡	
2019	Taemin	"Want"	Want	Tooji Keshtkar; JFMee; Saima Irén Mian; Anne Judith Wik; Nermin Harambasic; Ronny Vidar Svendsen; Martin Mulholland; Jonas Bjørdal	
2019	Taeyeon	"Four Seasons"	Purpose	Josh Cumbee; Afshin Salmani; Andrew Allen	
2019	Taeyeon	"Love You Like Crazy"	Purpose	LDN Noise	
2019	Taeyeon	"Spark"	Purpose	Anne Judith Wik; Ronny Svendsen	

=== 2020s ===
Name of song, featured performers, writer(s), original release, and year of release
Year	Artist	Song	Album	Written with	Ref.
2020	Baekhyun	"Candy"	Delight	Mike Daley; Mitchell Owens; Deez; Adrian McKinnon	
2020	Baekhyun	"Poppin'"	Delight	Jonathan Yip; Ray Romulus; Jeremy Reeves; Ray Charles McCullough II; August Rigo	
2020	Baekhyun	"R U Ridin'?"	Delight	Mike Daley; Mitchell Owens; Wilbart "Vedo" McCoy III	
2020	Baekhyun	"Garden in the Air"	SM Station - Our Beloved BoA	Sole writing ‡	
2020	Red Velvet	"Milky Way"	SM Station - Our Beloved BoA	Sole writing ‡	
2020	BoA	"Cut Me Off"	Better	Leon Paul Palmen; Emilie Adams	
2020	BoA	"L.O.V.E"	Better	BoA; LDN Noise	
2020	Itzy	"Be In Love"	Not Shy	Caesar & Loui; Cazzi Opeia	
2020	NCT U	"90's Love"	NCT 2020 Resonance	Jia Lih; Jeremy "Tay" Jasper; Jayden Henry; Adrian McKinnon; Jordain Johnson; Julien Maurice Moore; Timothy "Bos" Bullock; Hautboi Rich	
2020	NCT U	"All About You"	NCT 2020 Resonance	Zayson; Im Ga-in	
2020	NCT U	"Light Bulb"	NCT 2020 Resonance	Kim Dong-hyun; Jonathan Yip; Ray Romulus; Jeremy Reeves; Ray McCullough II	
2020	NCT U	"Outro: Dream Routine"	NCT 2020 Resonance	Dem Jointz; Keynon Moore	
2020	NCT U	"Raise the Roof"	NCT 2020 Resonance	Jakob Dorof; Karen Poole; Bobii Lewis; Sonny J Mason	
2020	NCT U	"Work It"	NCT 2020 Resonance	Mike Daley; Mitchell Owens; VEDO	
2020	NCT 2020	"Resonance"	NCT 2020 Resonance	Wilston Jordain Johnson; Timothy “Bos” Bullock; DAMIAN; Penomeco; VEDO; Maurice Moore; Karen Poole; Bobii Lewis; Hautboi Rich; Jakob Dorof; JYDN HILL; Jia Lih; Tay Jasper; Adrian McKinnon; Mike Daley; Mitchell Owens; Sonny J Mason	
2020	NCT 127	"Music, Dance"	NCT 2020 Resonance	Mike Daley; Mitchell Owens; Adrian McKinnon	
2020	NCT 127	"Non Stop"	Neo Zone: The Final Round	LDN Noise; Adrian McKinnon	
2020	NCT 127	"Punch"	Neo Zone: The Final Round	Dem Jointz; Keynon "KC" Moore	
2020	NCT 127	"White Night"	Neo Zone: The Final Round	Ji Yu-ri; Kim Hye-jung; JQ; The Wildcardz; Harvey Mason Jr. Kevin Randolph; Dewain Whitmore	
2020	Red Velvet - Irene & Seulgi	"Monster"	Monster	Yaakov "Yash" Gruzman; Delaney Jane; Jenson David Aubrey Vaughan; Yoo Young-jin	
2020	SF9	"The Stealer (The Scene)"	KINGDOM <RE-BORN>, Pt. 1	Sunwoo; Coach & Sendo; Theo Lawrence; Yuki; Youngbin; Zuho; Hwiyoung; Chani	
2020	SuperM	"Infinity"	Super One	Adrian McKinnon; Bobii Lewis; Jonatan Gusmark; Ludvig Evers	
2020	SuperM	"Monster"	Super One	Adrian McKinnon; Wilbart "Vedo" McCoy III; Jonatan Gusmark; Ludvig Evers	
2020	SuperM	"One (Monster & Infinity)"	Super One	Adrian McKinnon; Wilbart "Vedo" McCoy III; Bobii Lewis; Jonatan Gusmark; Ludvig Evers	
2020	Taeyeon	"What Do I Call You"	What Do I Call You	Linnea Södahl; Caroline Pennell; David Pramik	
2020	The Boyz	"Shake You Down"	Reveal	Andrew Choi; Moonshine	
2020	The Boyz	"Shine Shine"	Chase	Daniel "Obi" Klein; Charli Taft	
2020	The Boyz	"The Stealer"	Chase	Sunwoo; Coach & Sendo; Theo Lawrence; Yuki	
2020	Twice	"Believer"	Eyes Wide Open	Greg Bonnick; Hayden Chapman; Alice Penrose	
2021	Aespa	"I’ll Make You Cry"	Savage	Kirsten Collins; Timothy "BOS" Bullock; Brandon Green; Hautboi Rich	
2021	Baekhyun	"All I Got"	Bambi	Tone Stith	
2021	Baekhyun	"Cry For Love"	Bambi	Stephan Benson; Greg Bonnick; Hayden Chapman	
2021	Exo	"Don't Fight the Feeling"	Don't Fight the Feeling	Mike Jiminez; Damon Thomas; Tesung Kim; Tha Aristocrats; Tiyon "TC" Mack; Moon Kim	
2021	Joy	"Hello"	Hello	Park Hye-kyung; Kang Hyun-min; Park Ji-won	
2021	Key	"Bad Love"	Bad Love	Adrian McKinnon	
2021	Kriz	"Ready for Your Love"	High Class OST	Nile Lee	
2021	Kyuhyun, Onew & Taeil	"Ordinary Day"	2021 Winter SM Town: SMCU Express	Sole writing ‡	
2021	NCT	"OK!"	Universe	Maurice Moore; Jeremy "Tay" Jasper; Timothy "Bos" Bullock; Hautboi Rich	
2021	NCT	"Universe (Let's Play Ball)"	Universe	Mark Lee; Dem Jointz; Carlos Battey; Ryan S. Jhun; Breyan Isaac; Wayne Hector; Alexandru Cotoi; Marcel Botezan	
2021	NCT 127	"Favorite (Vampire)"	Favorite	Rodney "Darkchild" Jerkins; Rodnae "Chikk" Bell	
2021	NCT 127	"Gimme Gimme"	Loveholic	Meg.Me; Ludwig Evers; Jonatan Gusmark; Bobii Lewis; Cazzi Opeia	
2021	NCT Dream	"Bungee"	Hello Future	Jonatan Gusmark; Ludvig Evers; Stephan Benson	
2021	NCT Dream	"Hello Future"	Hello Future	Jonatan Gusmark; Ludvig Evers; Adrian McKinnon	
2021	NCT Dream	"Diggity"	Hot Sauce	Jonatan Gusmark; Ludvig Evers; Cazzi Opeia	
2021	Red Velvet	"Pushin' N Pullin'"	Queendom	Mike Daley; Mitchell Owens; Nicole Cohen	
2021	Shinee	"CØDE"	Don't Call Me	Jonatan Gusmark; Ludvig Evers; Adrian McKinnon	
2021	Shinee	"Don't Call Me"	Don't Call Me	Dem Jointz; Rodnae "Chikk" Bell	
2021	Shinee	"Heart Attack"	Don't Call Me	Andrew Choi minGtion; Dvwn	
2021	Shinee	"Seasons"	Superstar	Adrian McKinnon; Sara Sakurai	
2021	Wendy	"Like Water"	Like Water	Yoo Young-jin; Coach & Sendo; Anne Judith Wik	
2022	Apink	"Holy Moly"	Horn	Son Na-eun	
2022	Kyuhyun	"Love Story"	Love Story	Sole writing ‡	
2022	Kyuhyun	"Coffee"	Love Story	Sole writing ‡	
2022	Kyuhyun	"Together"	Love Story	Sole writing ‡	
2022	Girls' Generation	"Forever 1"	Forever 1	Sole writing ‡	
2022	Itzy	"365"	Checkmate	Deez; Yunsu; Ylva Dimberg	
2022	Key	"Gasoline"	Gasoline	Key; Moonshine; Keynon "KC" Moore; Ninos Hanna	
2022	Nayeon	"Pop!"	Im Nayeon	LDN Noise; Ellen Berg; Lee Seu-ran	
2022	NCT 127	"Crash Landing"	2 Baddies	IMLAY; JUNNY	
2022	NCT Dream	"Sorry, Heart"	Beatbox	Matthew Tishler	
2022	NCT Dream	"Candy"	Candy	Jang Yong-jin	
2022	NCT Dream	"Graduation"	Candy	Benjamin 55; JUNNY; Zayson	
2022	Oasiso	"Clink Clink"	WSG WANNABE 1st Album	Coach & Sendo; Karen Poole; Gabriel Brandes; Phat Fabe	
2022	Red Velvet	"Bye Bye"	The ReVe Festival 2022 – Birthday	Ludwig Evers; Jonatan Gusmark; Moa "Cazzi Opeia" Carlebecker; Ellen Berg	
2022	Super Junior	"Callin'"	The Road: Winter for Spring	Sole writing ‡	
2022	Taeyeon	"Set Myself On Fire"	INVU	Alna Hofmeyr; Michael Dunaief; Ryland Holland; Hamid Bashir	
2023	BAE173	"GT"	Peak Time	Mike Daley; Owens Mitchell; Adrien McKinnon	
2023	DKB	"Coco Colada"	Peak Time	JINBYJIN; Ronny Svendsen; Anne Judith Wik; E-CHAN; GK	
2023	Dowha, Elly, Hwiseo, Jiwoo, Juri, Yeeun & Yeoreum	"Last Piece"	Queendom Puzzle Final	Adrian Mckinnon; Jonathan Gusmark; Ludvig Evers	
2023	Nana, Suyun, Yeonhee, Wooyeon, Yuki, Jihan & Kei	"Billionaire"	Queendom Puzzle Final	Courtney Woolsey; Greg Bonnick; Hayden Chapman	
2023	Key	"Intoxicating"	Good & Great	Adrian McKinnon; Timothy “Bos” Bullock	
2023	Key	"Good & Great"	Good & Great	Boy Matthews; Ferras; Will Leong	
2023	NCT 127	"Ay-Yo"	Ay-Yo	Calixte; Adrian McKinnon; Dem Jointz; Tropkillaz	
2023	NCT 127	"Be There for Me"	Be There For Me	Andrew Bazzi; Jackson Lee Morgan; Kaelyn Behr; Kevin White; Landon Sears; Manifest; Mike Woods; MZMC; Rudy Sandapa	
2023	NCT Dream	"ISTJ"	ISTJ	Adrian Thesen; Anne Judith Wik; Bobii Lewis; Ronny Svendsen	
2023	NCT Wish	"Hands Up"	Steady	Jonatan Gusmark; Ludvig Evers; Adrian McKinnon; H.Toyosaki	
2023	Nmixx	"Just Did It"	Expérgo	Lee Seu-ran; Hezen; Phat Fabe; Harry Sommerdahl; Ylva Dimberg	
2023	Red Velvet	"Chill Kill"	Chill Kill	Ellen Berg; Jonatan Gusmark; Ludvig Evers; Moa "Cazzi Opeia" Carlebecker	
2023	Riize	"Memories"	Get a Guitar	Ronny Svendsen; Adrian Thesen; Anne Judith Wik; Bobii Lewis; Pizzapunk	
2023	Shinee	"Hard"	Hard	Andrew Choi; No2zcat	
2023	Shinee	"Juice"	Hard	Dem Jointz; Adrian McKinnon	
2023	Swan	"The End"	My Lovely Boxer OST	Jeong Joo-ae; Baek Han-na (KaLeT); Kim Yu-hyeon; Nile Lee	
2023	Taeyeon	"To. X"	To. X	Stephen Puth; Dazy; Kristin Carpenter	
2023	The Boyz	"Roar"	Be Awake	Deez; Yunsu; Saay	
2023	TVXQ	"Rebel"	20&2	Cazzi Opeia; Adrian McKinnon; Jonatan Gusmark; Ludvig Evers	
2024	Aespa	"Bahama"	Armageddon	Cazzi Opeia; Ellen Berg; Moonshine	
2024	Aespa	"Supernova"	Armageddon	Dem Jointz; Paris Alexa	
2024	Aespa	"Hot Mess"	Hot Mess	Moonshine; Cazzi Opeia; Ellen Berg; H.Toyosaki	
2024	Bang Ye-dam & Winter	"Officially Cool"	—N/a	Andrew Choi no2zcat Jsong	
2024	Doyoung	"Dallas Love Field"	Youth	Sole writing ‡	
2024	Doyoung	"The Story"	—N/a	Doyoung; Seo Dong Hwan	
2024	Irene	"Calling Me Back"	Like A Flower	Mike Daley; Mitchell Owens; Adrian McKinnon	
2024	NCT 127	"Can’t Help Myself"	Walk	Peter Wallevik; Daniel Davidsen; Benjamin Samama; David Arkwright	
2024	Key	"Fresh"	Tongue Tied	H. Toyosaki; Greg Bonnick; Hayden Chapman; Adrian McKinnon	
2024	Red Velvet	"Cosmic"	Cosmic	Jonatan Gusmark; Ludvig Evers; Adrian McKinnon; Ellen Berg	
2024	TWS	"Keep On"	Summer Beat	BUMZU; Jeon Jin (PRISMFILTER); Heon Seo	
2024	WayV	"Give Me That"	Give Me That	Pan Yan Ting; Courtlin Jabrae; Pontus Petersson; TBHits; Ludwig Lindell	
2024	Wendy	"Wish You Hell"	Wish You Hell	Nate Campany; Chloe Angelides; Jesse Saint John; Andre Davidson; Sean Davidson	
2024	Zerobaseone	"Good So Bad"	Cinema Paradise	Andrew Choi no2zcat Jsong	
2024	WayV	"Go Higher"	The Highest	Keynon Moore; Jonatan Gusmark; Ludvig Evers	
2024	Riize	"Combo"	Riizing: Epilogue	Ronny Svendsen; Heffybeluga; Anne Judith Wik; Bobii Lewis	
2024	NCT Wish	"Wish"	Wishful	Jeanjinn.jane dress Heon Seo; George Gershwin; Ira Gershwin	
2024	NCT Wish	"Touchdown"	Wishful	McKinnon; Pangemanan; Ludvig Evers (Moonshine); Jonatan Gusmark (Moonshine)	
2024	NCT Wish	"Steady"	Steady	Karen Poole; Georgia Ku; Lewis Jankel; No2zcat	
2024	DearALICE	"Life is a Movie"	Made in Korea	Heffybeluga; Bobii Lewis; Ronny Svendsen; Anne Judith Wik	
2024	Project 7	"Psycho"	Project 7 Final	Sole writing ‡	
2025	SMTOWN	"Thank You"	2025 SM Town: The Culture, The Future	Andrew Choi; No2zcat; Jsong; Kim Yoo-hyun	
2025	Hearts2Hearts	"The Chase"	The Chase	No2zcat; Lauren Faith; Hannah Yadi; Jorja Douglas; Renée Downer; Stella Quaresma	
2025	Hearts2Hearts	"Focus"	Focus	dwilly Michael Matosic; Dewain Whitmore; Hailey Collier	
2025	Hearts2Hearts	"Flutter"	Focus	Andrew Choi no2zcat Jsong	
2025	Hearts2Hearts	"Style"	Focus	Mike Daley; Mitchell Owens; Adrian McKinnon; Sara Forsberg	
2025	Seulgi	"Baby, Not Baby"	Accidentally on Purpose	Stela Cole; Becca Krueger; Charlie Snyder; Erick Serna	
2025	INI	"Potion"	The Origin	Andrew Choi; Jsong no2zcat Rikito	
2025	NCT Wish	"Poppop"	Poppop	Jackson Lee Morgan; JBach; Amelia Moore; Pink Slip; Inverness; MZMC	
2025	NCT Wish	"Melt Inside My Pocket"	Poppop	Andrew Choi; Jsong; Rouno	
2025	NCT Wish	"Color"	Color	Andrew Choi; Jsong; Rouno	
2025	NCT Wish	"Cheat Code"	Color	Andrew Choi; Jsong; Rouno	
2025	Zerobaseone	"Blue"	Blue Paradise	Andrew Choi; Jsong; Noz2cat	
2025	Zerobaseone	"Long Way Back"	Never Say Never	Erik Lidbom; Andrew Choi	
2025	Zerobaseone	"Extra"	Never Say Never	Andrew Choi; Jsong; Noz2cat	
2025	Zerobaseone	"I Know U Know"	Never Say Never	Matthew Tishler	
2025	Riize	"Ember to Solar"	Odyssey	Woomin Lee "Collapsedone"; Justin Reinstein; Jyll; Andreas Ringblom	
2025	Riize	"Inside My Love"	Odyssey	Daniel Davidsen; Peter Wallevik; David Arkwright; Ben Samama; PhD	
2025	Red Velvet – Irene & Seulgi	"Girl Next Door"	Tilt	Jonatan Gusmark; Ludvig Evers; Cazzi Opeia; Adrian McKinnon; Moonshine	
2025	Park Bo-gum	"On My Way"	—N/a	Andrew Choi no2zcat Jsong	
2025	NCT Dream	"BTTF"	Go Back to the Future	Benjamin 55; Stary 55; Jeffrey Paul Allen; Duii; Ninos Hanna; WILJAM	
2025	NCT Dream	"Chiller"	Go Back to the Future	Andrew Choi no2zcat Jsong	
2025	NCT Dream	"Cold Coffee"	Beat It Up	Ronny Svendsen; Heffybeluga; Anne Judith Wik; Bobii Lewis	
2025	WayV	"Your Song"	Big Bands	Wang Jing Yun; Andrew Choi; Bobii Lewis; Ronny Svendsen; Heffybeluga	
2025	Key	"Infatuation"	Hunter	Jonatan Gusmark; Ludvig Evers; Adrian McKinnon; Moonshine	
2025	Key	"Hunter"	Hunter	Moonshine; Jonatan Gusmark; Ludvig Evers; Cazzi Opeia; Adrian McKinnon	
2025	Key	"Glam"	Hunter	Jonatan Gusmark; Ludvig Evers; Cazzi Opeia; Henrik Heaven; Moonshine	
2025	Idntt	"Storm"	˂unevermet˃	Andrew Choi no2zcat Jsong	
2025	Aespa	"Angel #48"	Rich Man	Wilhelmina; Greg Bonnick; Hayden Chapman	
2025	Twice	"Me+You"	Ten: The Story Goes On	Charli Taft; Daniel “Obi” Klein; Nayeon; Jeongyeon; Momo; Sana; Jihyo; Mina; Dahyun; Chaeyoung; Tzuyu	
2025	Itzy	"DYT"	Tunnel Vision	Jsong; Rouno	
2025	Alpha Drive One	"Formula"	Euphoria	Jonatan Gusmark; Ludvig Evers; Adrian McKinnon	
2026	Shinee	"Atmos"	Atmos	Eldon; Andrew Choi; Rouno	
2026	Shinee	"Hours"	Atmos	Hayden Chapman; Greg Bonnick; Adrian McKinnon	
2026	Riize	"Soar"	II	Ronny Svendsen; Heffybeluga; Anne Judith Wik; Adrian McKinnon	
2026	Riize	"Like a Bomb"	II	Chikk; Chaz Jackson; Kosmic	
2026	Hearts2Hearts	"Lemon Tang"	Lemon Tang	Andrew Choi no2zcat Jsong; Rouno	
2026	Hearts2Hearts	"Iconic Heart"	—N/a	Ronny Svendsen; Natsumi Kobayashi; Adrian Thesen; Anne Judith Wik; Bobii Lewis	
2026	Red Velvet	"Hot Girls Cold Vibe"	Velvet Summer	Ronny Svendsen; Adrian Thesen; Anne Judith Wik; Bobii Lewis	
2026	Girls' Generation-HRS	"Skibidi"	—N/a	Jinbyjin; Hwang Hyun; Cazzi Opeia	
2026	NCT Wish	"Hubble Time"	I Spy	August Rigo; Dem Jointz	
2026	Plave	"Rewind"	Hyperdrive	Yejun; Noah; Bamby; Hamin; Eunho no2zcat Jsong; Rouno	
