= Bad Love =

Bad Love may refer to:

== Albums ==
- Bad Love (album), a 1999 album by Randy Newman
- Bad Love (EP), 2021

== Songs ==
- "Bad Love" (Eric Clapton song), 1989
- "Bad Love" (Key song), 2021
- "Bad Love" (Pake McEntire song), 1986
- "Bad Love", by 45 Grave from Sleep in Safety, 1983
- "Bad Love", by AAA, 2019
- "Bad Love", by Krokus from Painkiller, 1978
- "Bad Love", by Lita Ford from Dangerous Curves, 1991
- "Bad Love", by Sean Paul from Mad Love the Prequel, 2019
- "Bad Love", by Tokio Hotel from 2001, 2022

== Other media ==
- Bad Love or Cruel Love, a 2007 South Korean drama
- Bad Love, a 1994 Alex Delaware novel by Jonathan Kellerman
