= Hologram (EP) =

- Digital and Regular edition cover

EP by Key
- Released: December 21, 2018
- Studio: InGrid (Seoul)
- Genre: J-pop
- Length: 17:30
- Language: Japanese
- Label: EMI Records
- Producer: Nozumu Tsuchiya; Avenue 52; Kevin Charge; Gabe Lopez; Lee Soo-man; Fredrik Thomander; Toyo

Key chronology
Face (2018)	Hologram (2018)	Bad Love (2021)

Singles from Hologram
- 1. "Hologram" Released: December 21, 2018

Hologram is the first Japanese extended play by South Korean singer Key. It was released digitally on December 21, 2018, through EMI Records, with its physical release following on December 26, 2018.

== Background and release ==
Key made his debut as a solo artist in November 2018 with the studio album Face. On December 5, 2018, it was revealed that he was planning to release his first Japanese extended play, including four original Japanese songs and the Japanese version of his Korean single "One of Those Nights". The cover artwork was designed by the illustrator Chocomoo in collaboration with Key. The songs "Hologram" and "Why Are You Here" were broadcast on J-Wave on December 12 and 13. The digital edition was released on December 21 and the physical edition was released on December 26. To promote the EP, Key held a live event titled Key Land at World Memorial Hall in Kobe on December 22 and Yokohama Arena on December 25.

== Composition ==
Lead single and title track "Hologram" is retro-inspired, setting the tone for the rest of the EP. "Why Are You Here" is a duet with CoCo, and the lyrics concern romantic misunderstandings between a man and a woman. "Power" was written and composed by L'Arc-en-Ciel member Tetsuya, and is described as "hybrid rock groove". "City Girl" is about the feeling of being in love from the perspective of a city boy.

== Track listing ==
Hologram track listing
No.	Title	Lyrics	Music	Arrangement	Length
1.	"Hologram"	Meg.Me	Sean Alexander; Drew Ryan Scott; Gabriel Steve Lopez	Lopez; Avenue 52	3:11
2.	"Why Are You Here" (featuring CoCo)	Junji Ishiwatari	Andreas Öberg; Fredrik Thomander; Maria Marcus	Thomander	3:18
3.	"Power"	Tetsuya	Tetsuya; Obi Mhondera; Kyler Niko; Kevin Charge	Charge	3:57
4.	"City Girl"	Meg.Me	Alexander; Scott; Toyo	Toyo	3:53
5.	"One of Those Nights" (Japanese version)	Kenzie	Noah Conrad; Jake Torrey; Riley Thomas Donnell; Daniel Doran Henig; Adrian McKinnon	Conrad; Torrey	3:11
Total length:					17:30

== Charts ==
Chart performance for Hologram
Chart (2019)	Peak position
Japan Hot Albums (Billboard Japan)	5
Japanese Albums (Oricon)	4

== Release history ==
Release history and formats for Hologram
Region	Date	Format(s)	Label	Ref.
Various	December 21, 2018	Digital download; streaming	EMI Records	
Japan	December 26, 2018	CD; CD+DVD	EMI Records	
