= Gasoline (Key album) =

- Digital and VHS version cover

Studio album by Key
- Released: August 30, 2022
- Genre: K-pop
- Length: 36:56
- Languages: Korean; English
- Labels: SM; Dreamus

Key chronology
Bad Love (2021)	Gasoline (2022)	Good & Great (2023)

Singles from Gasoline
- 1. "Gasoline" Released: August 30, 2022

Killer cover
- Digital cover

Singles from Killer
- 1. "Killer" Released: February 13, 2023

Gasoline is the second studio album by South Korean singer Key. It was released on August 30, 2022, through SM Entertainment. It consists of eleven tracks, including lead single "Gasoline". The album was commercially successful, debuting at number one on South Korea's Circle Album Chart, and received positive reviews from music critics. A reissue, titled Killer, was released on February 13, 2023. It features three new songs, including the lead single of the same name. Gasoline and Killer form the second and third parts of the "retro trilogy" Key started with his 2021 EP Bad Love.

== Background ==
Gasoline was Key's first solo release in nearly a year, following his 2021 EP Bad Love. His first studio album Face was released in 2018. He began developing the album while working on Bad Love, and took inspiration from various retro horror films, such as Friday the 13th, Gremlins and Mars Attacks!. Born in 1991, he grew up before the introduction of computer-animated films, and was influenced by the hand-drawn designs associated with the films of his childhood. Key stated that he wanted to show a different, more "powerful" side with this album, describing it as "Something that only Key can do". He wrote four of the eleven songs himself, saying he wanted "to give life to the album" by including autobiographical stories.

== Composition ==
Lead single "Gasoline" is a hip hop dance song that features chanting laid over brass and drum sounds. The lyrics, written by Key, express his determination to forge his own path like gasoline. "Bound" is an uptempo pop song with a heavy bass and various club sounds. The lyrics describe his desire to overcome his limitations. "Villain" features Jeno of NCT, and contains rhythmic synths and FX sounds. It is about a villain who has aspirations of becoming the hero. "Burn" is a pop song that features piano riffs, a strong bass and rhythmic electric guitar sounds. Lyrically, it is described as an "emotional" song about the burning flames of a relationship. "Guilty Pleasure" is a synthwave song that utilises synthesizers and bass. "G.O.A.T (Greatest of All Time)" is a pop ballad about the hardships and concerns of adulthood. It includes bells, synths and soft bass sounds, with an orchestra in the second half. "I Can't Sleep" is an uptempo pop song with electric guitar riffs. The lyrics describe feelings of insomnia. "Ain't Gonna Dance" is a midtempo pop song with rhythmic 808 bass and drum loops. It depicts the relationship between two people who are cautious about expressing their attraction to each other. "Another Life" is an electropop dance song with synth sounds. Written in English, the lyrics describe wanting to travel to another dimension in pursuit of eternal love. "Delight" is a retro-inspired disco pop song that features keyboards, organ, bass and drums. R&B song "Proud" contains autobiographical themes and was inspired by passages from Key's mother's diary. It incorporates hip hop drum beats, 808 bass, piano and guitar sounds.

"Killer" is an uptempo dance song based on 1980s new wave and synth-pop. Synthesizers and drums combine to create a dark mood, and the lyrics describe being unable to forget a partner after a break-up. "Heartless" is a rock-based dance song with electric guitar and strong timpani and bass sounds. It is about the creature created by the mad scientist that appears on the jacket of Gasoline. Finally, "Easy" is a midtempo pop song that features heavy 808 bass, sub-bass and drums, with strings in the second half.

== Release and promotion ==
On August 9, 2022, Key's agency SM Entertainment announced the album's release through the publication of a teaser poster on Shinee's social media accounts. It was confirmed to contain eleven tracks, including lead single "Gasoline", with the release date set for August 30. Promotional materials, including concept images and videos, were revealed from August 16 onwards, showcasing a gothic theme. Key performed the lead single for the first time at the SM Town Live 2022: SMCU Express concert at Suwon World Cup Stadium. A music video for album track "Another Life" was released on August 26, followed by a lyric video for "Proud" the next day". Key hosted a countdown livestream on August 30 through Shinee's YouTube and TikTok channels to celebrate the album's release. The set where he shot the teaser images for Gasoline was available as a photo zone for fans at SM's Seongsu-dong office until September 13.

The album was reissued under the title Killer on February 13, 2023. The reissued edition added three new songs: "Heartless", "Easy" and lead single "Killer". His agency stated that it would form the final part of his "retro trilogy". Ahead of its release, Key collaborated with graphic designer DHL on an art exhibition themed around the Year of the Rabbit. The artwork was created using artificial intelligence and took inspiration from Killer.

== Critical reception ==
Professional ratings
Review scores
Source	Rating
IZM	3/5 stars
NME	4/5 stars

Gasoline received generally positive reviews from music critics. Writing for IZM, Yeom Dong-gyo felt that Gasoline solidified Key's identity as a solo artist. He believed that it was a strong follow-up to Face, highlighting the album's autobiographical themes. NME reviewer Tanu I. Raj praised Key's songwriting abilities, stating that the songs he contributed lyrics to were particular standouts. South Korean music webzine Idology selected it as one of the best albums of 2022.

== Track listing ==
Gasoline track listing
No.	Title	Lyrics	Music	Arrangement	Length
1.	"Gasoline" (Korean: 가솔린; RR: Gasollin)	Key; Kenzie	Kenzie; Moonshine; Keynon "KC" Moore; Ninos Hanna	Moonshine; Kenzie	3:11
2.	"Bound"	Park Tae-won	Bram Inscore; Sarah Hudson; Dale Anthoni; Manu Ríos	Inscore; Imlay	3:04
3.	"Villain" (featuring Jeno of NCT)	Lee Hyung-seok	Rollo; Max Frost; Ian Kirkpatrick	Rollo; Frost; Imlay	3:07
4.	"Burn"	Lee Seu-ran	Ryan S. Jhun; Etham Basden; Lauren Aquilina; Luke Fitton	Jhun; Fitton	3:51
5.	"Guilty Pleasure"	Lee Hyung-seok	Greg Bonnick; Hayden Chapman; Adrian McKinnon; Deez	LDN Noise; Deez	3:48
6.	"G.O.A.T (Greatest of All Time)"	Key; Kang Eun-jeong	David Amber (153/Joombas); August Rigo	Amber	3:15
7.	"I Can't Sleep"	Key	Jhun; Nathan Cunningham; Marc Raymond Ernest Sibley; Wyatt Sanders; Nolan Sipe	Jhun; Cunningham; Sibley	3:51
8.	"Ain't Gonna Dance"	Lee Yeon-ji	Jack Morgan; Rug Wilson; Will Lansley; John Morgan	Punctual	2:57
9.	"Another Life"	Curtis Richardson; Adien Lewis	Matt Thomson; Max Lynedoch Graham; Richardson; Lewis; James F. Reynolds	Arcades; Richardson; Lewis; TAK	3:38
10.	"Delight"	Jo Yoon-kyung	Sam Klempner; Scott Quinn	Klempner	2:59
11.	"Proud"	Key	Mike Daley; Tido Nguyen; Jeffrey Okyere-Twusami; Stephan Lee Benson	Daley; Tido	3:15
Total length:					36:56

Killer track listing
No.	Title	Lyrics	Music	Arrangement	Length
1.	"Killer"	Hwang Yu-bin	Christoph Cronauer; Simon Klose; Rita Bavanati; Thilo Berndt	Klosely	3:50
2.	"Heartless"	Kang Eun-jung	Galeyn Tenhaeff; Catalina Schweighauser; Jon Hällgren; Lukas Hällgren	Jon Hällgren; Lukas Hällgren	3:07
3.	"Gasoline" (Korean: 가솔린; RR: Gasollin)	Key; Kenzie	Kenzie; Moonshine; Keynon "KC" Moore; Ninos Hanna	Moonshine; Kenzie	3:11
4.	"Bound"	Park Tae-won	Bram Inscore; Sarah Hudson; Dale Anthoni; Manu Ríos	Inscore; Imlay	3:04
5.	"Villain" (featuring Jeno of NCT)	Lee Hyung-seok	Rollo; Max Frost; Ian Kirkpatrick	Rollo; Frost; Imlay	3:07
6.	"Easy"	Park Tae-won	Hayden Chapman; Greg Bonnick; JQ Smith; Dewain Whitmore Jr.	LDN Noise	3:56
7.	"Burn"	Lee Seu-ran	Ryan S. Jhun; Etham Basden; Lauren Aquilina; Luke Fitton	Jhun; Fitton	3:51
8.	"Guilty Pleasure"	Lee Hyung-seok	Greg Bonnick; Hayden Chapman; Adrian McKinnon; Deez	LDN Noise; Deez	3:48
9.	"G.O.A.T (Greatest of All Time)"	Key; Kang Eun-jeong	David Amber (153/Joombas); August Rigo	Amber	3:15
10.	"I Can't Sleep"	Key	Jhun; Nathan Cunningham; Marc Raymond Ernest Sibley; Wyatt Sanders; Nolan Sipe	Jhun; Cunningham; Sibley	3:51
11.	"Ain't Gonna Dance"	Lee Yeon-ji	Jack Morgan; Rug Wilson; Will Lansley; John Morgan	Punctual	2:57
12.	"Another Life"	Curtis Richardson; Adien Lewis	Matt Thomson; Max Lynedoch Graham; Richardson; Lewis; James F. Reynolds	Arcades; Richardson; Lewis; TAK	3:38
13.	"Delight"	Jo Yoon-kyung	Sam Klempner; Scott Quinn	Klempner	2:59
14.	"Proud"	Key	Mike Daley; Tido Nguyen; Jeffrey Okyere-Twusami; Stephan Lee Benson	Daley; Tido	3:15
Total length:					47:49

== Personnel ==
- Key – vocals, background vocals
- Kenzie – vocal directing (tracks 1, 5)
- Keynon "KC" Moore – background vocals (track 1)
- Ninos Hanna – background vocals (track 1)
- Xydo – background vocals (track 1)
- Lee Ji-hong – recording (tracks 1, 5), mixing (track 8)
- No Min-ji – digital editing (tracks 1, 3–5, 8, 11), recording (tracks 3–4, 11), engineering for mix (track 8)
- Kim Cheol-sun – mixing (track 1)
- Kim Yeon-soo – vocal directing (tracks 2, 9)
- Byeon Jang-mun – background vocals (tracks 2–3, 8)
- Jeong Ho-jin – recording (track 2)
- Woo Min-jeong – recording (tracks 2–3, 8), digital editing (track 3)
- Kwon Yu-jin – digital editing (tracks 2, 8–10), recording (track 5)
- Kang Eun-ji – engineering for mix (tracks 2, 8), recording (tracks 6–7, 9), digital editing (tracks 6, 8–10)
- Nam Gung-jin – mixing (track 2)
- Kriz – vocal directing (track 3)
- Jeno – vocals, background vocals (track 3)
- Max Frost – background vocals (track 3)
- Lee Min-gyu – mixing (tracks 3, 6–7), recording (tracks 7, 10), digital editing (track 7)
- minGtion – vocal directing (tracks 4, 7)
- Etham Basden – background vocals (track 4)
- An Chang-gyu – digital editing (tracks 4–6, 10)
- Jeong Eui-seok – mixing (tracks 4, 11)
- Ju Chan-yang – background vocals (track 5), vocal directing (track 8)
- Adrian McKinnon – background vocals (track 5)
- Gu Jong-pil – mixing (tracks 5, 9)
- Jeon Seong-woo – vocal directing (tracks 6, 10)
- Kang Tae-woo – background vocals (tracks 6, 10)
- August Rigo – background vocals (track 6)
- Junny – background vocals (tracks 7, 9)
- Jack Morgan – background vocals (track 8)
- Adien Lewis – background vocals (track 9)
- Curtis Richardson – background vocals (track 9)
- Jeong Yu-ra – mixing (track 10)
- Maxx – vocal directing (track 11), digital editing (track 11)
- Kwon Nam-woo – mastering

== Charts ==
=== Weekly charts ===
Weekly chart performance for Gasoline
Chart (2022)	Peak position
Japanese Albums (Oricon)	26
Japanese Combined Albums (Oricon)	46
Japanese Hot Albums (Billboard Japan)	24
South Korean Albums (Circle)	1
UK Album Downloads (Official Charts)	70

Weekly chart performance for Killer
Chart (2023)	Peak position
Japanese Albums (Oricon)	24
Japanese Combined Albums (Oricon)	42
Japanese Hot Albums (Billboard Japan)	33
South Korean Albums (Circle)	6

=== Monthly charts ===
Monthly chart performance for Gasoline
Chart (2022)	Peak position
South Korean Albums (Circle)	11

Monthly chart performance for Killer
Chart (2023)	Peak position
South Korean Albums (Circle)	16
