= Hate That... =

Single by Key featuring Taeyeon

from the EP Bad Love
- Language: Korean; English
- Released: August 30, 2021
- Studio: SM SSAM (Seoul); Sound Pool (Seoul)
- Genre: R&B
- Length: 3:05
- Label: SM; Dreamus
- Composers: Stephen Puth; Lauren Mandel; Eric Potapenko
- Lyricist: Hwang Yu-bin

Key singles chronology
"I Wanna Be" (2019)	"Hate That..." (2021)	"Bad Love" (2021)

Taeyeon singles chronology
"Weekend" (2021)	"Hate That..." (2021)	"Little Garden" (2021)

Music video
- "Hate That..." on YouTube

"Hate That..." is a song by South Korean singer Key featuring Taeyeon. It was released digitally on August 30, 2021, by SM Entertainment as the first single from Key's extended play Bad Love. The song is written by Hwang Yu-bin and composed by Stephen Puth, Lauren Mandel, and Eric Potapenko.

== Background and release ==
On August 24, 2021, it was announced that Key would be pre-releasing a digital single titled "Hate That..." prior to the release of a new album at the end of September. On August 26, it was announced that Taeyeon would be featured on the song. On August 28, the music video teaser was released. On August 30, the song together with the music video was released.

== Composition ==
"Hate That..." was written by Hwang Yu-bin and composed by Stephen Puth, Lauren Mandel, and Eric Potapenko. Musically, the song is described as an R&B song characterized by a "sentimental guitar melody and sophisticated rhythm" with lyrics about "expressing the hope that the other person will not forget about them after a breakup" in monologue format. "Hate That..." was composed in the key of A-flat minor, with a tempo of 77 beats per minute.

== Commercial performance ==
"Hate That..." debuted at position 46 on South Korea's Gaon Digital Chart in the chart issue dated August 29 – September 4, 2021. The song also debuted at positions 2, 120, and 60 on the Gaon Download Chart, Gaon Streaming Chart, and Gaon BGM Chart, respectively, in the chart issue dated August 29 – September 4, 2021. The song debuted at positions 5 and 72 on Billboard World Digital Song Sales and the K-pop Hot 100, respectively, in the chart issue dated September 11, 2021.

== Promotion ==
Prior to the song's release, on August 30, 2021, Key held a live event called "Key 'Hate That...' Countdown Live" on V Live to introduce the song and communicate with his fans.

== Credits and personnel ==
Credits adapted from Melon.

Studio

- SM SSAM Studio – recording, digital editing
- Sound POOL Studios – recording
- SM Big Shot Studio – engineered for mix, mixing
- 821 Sound – mastering

Personnel

- Key – vocals, background vocals
- Taeyeon – vocals, background vocals
- Hwang Yu-bin – lyrics
- Stephen Puth – composition, arrangement, background vocals
- Lauren Mandel – composition, background vocals
- Eric Potapenko – arrangement
- Emily Yeonseo Kim – vocal directing
- Kang Eun-ji – recording, digital editing
- Jeong Ho-jin – recording
- Lee Min-kyu – engineered for mix, mixing
- Kwon Nam-woo – mastering

== Charts ==
Weekly chart performance for "Hate That..."
Chart (2021)	Peak position
South Korea (Gaon)	46
South Korea (K-pop Hot 100)	72
US World Digital Song Sales (Billboard)	5

== Accolades ==
Listicles for "Hate That..."
Publisher	List	Placement	Ref.
South China Morning Post	The 20 best K-pop songs of 2021	5th	
Teen Vogue	The 54 Best K-Pop Songs of 2021	Placed	

== Release history ==
Release dates and formats for "Hate That..."
Region	Date	Format	Label	Ref.
Various	August 30, 2021	Digital download; streaming	SM; Dreamus	
