= Good & Great =

EP by Key
- Released: September 11, 2023
- Genre: K-pop
- Length: 19:26
- Languages: Korean; English
- Label: SM

Key chronology
Gasoline (2022)	Good & Great (2023)	Pleasure Shop (2024)

Singles from Good & Great
- 1. "Good & Great" Released: September 11, 2023

Professional ratings
Review scores
Source	Rating
NME	4/5 stars

Good & Great is the second Korean extended play (EP) by South Korean singer Key. It was released on September 11, 2023, through SM Entertainment. The EP features an office theme, and contains six songs from various genres, including the title track as the lead single.

== Background ==
In May 2023, Key's agency, SM Entertainment, released an earnings report revealing that he was scheduled to release a new EP in the third quarter of the year. The EP follows his "retro trilogy" series, consisting of Bad Love (2021), Gasoline (2022) and Gasoline's reissue Killer (2023).

== Composition ==
The EP consists of six songs from various genres. Lead single "Good & Great" is a dance-pop song with a rhythmic piano melody. The song is aimed at office workers, and contains lyrics about Key taking pride in his work. "Can't Say Goodbye" is a retro pop song that combines guitar, synths, slap bass and drums to create a "funky" mood. The lyrics are about being unable to say goodbye to someone. The third track, "Intoxicating", is an uptempo house-pop song about falling in love. It features rhythmic synth beats, strong 808 bass and "dynamic" vocal melodies composed of alternating low and high notes. "Live Without You" is a dance-pop song containing funk guitar and repetitive bass riffs. It compares trying to erase memories of an ex-partner to drinking alcohol. "CoolAs" is an English song belonging to the electro-dance genre, containing a low-pitched bassline and synths. Finally, R&B track "Mirror Mirror" features guitar riffs, whistling sounds and soft synth bell arpeggios. The lyrics, penned by Key, are about his feelings when looking in the mirror.

== Release and promotion ==
Good & Great was announced on August 21, 2023, through the release of a teaser image showing an employee ID badge. Pre-orders began the same day. A schedule for promotional content was revealed using the productivity application Notion, fitting the office theme. Key released a series of teaser videos titled "Work Week", depicting him as a tired employee working in an office. He launched a website where users could have their own virtual desk and leave each other messages. The EP was released on September 11, and Key held a live broadcast to commemorate its release through Shinee's social media accounts.

== Track listing ==
Good & Great track listing
No.	Title	Lyrics	Music	Arrangement	Length
1.	"Good & Great"	Kenzie	Will Leong; James "Boy Matthews" Norton; Ferras	Leong	3:19
2.	"Can't Say Goodbye"	Park Tae-won	Daniel Davidsen; Peter Wallevik; Iain James; Chelsea Grimes	PhD	3:23
3.	"Intoxicating"	Kenzie	Adrian McKinnon; Timothy "Bos" Bullock; Kenzie	Bullock	3:11
4.	"Live Without You"	Jo Yoon-kyung	Max Margolis; Howard Lawrence; KODA; DonnyBravo	Margolis; DonnyBravo; Lawrence	3:24
5.	"CoolAs"	Tony Ferrari	David Wilson; Orion Meshorer; Dewain Whitmore Jr.; Patrick "J. Que" Smith	Dwilly; Meshorer	2:58
6.	"Mirror, Mirror"	Key	Manifest; Jackson Morgan; Jonathan Hoskins; MZMC	Hoskins; MZMC	3:11
Total length:					19:26

== Personnel ==
- Key – vocals, background vocals
- minGtion – vocal directing (tracks 1, 4)
- Junny – background vocals (tracks 1, 3–4, 6)
- Lee Min-gyu – recording (tracks 1, 3–6), digital editing (tracks 1, 6), engineering for mix (track 6), mixing (track 6)
- Jeong Yu-ra – recording (tracks 1–4), digital editing (tracks 3–4), mixing (track 3)
- Nam Gung-jin – mixing (track 1)
- 1Take (Newtype) – vocal directing (tracks 2, 6), background vocals (track 2), recording (track 2)
- Iain James – background vocals (track 2)
- Lee Ji-hong – digital editing (track 2), engineering for mix (track 2), mixing (track 2)
- Kenzie – vocal directing (track 3)
- Adrian McKinnon – background vocals (track 3)
- No Min-ji – digital editing (track 3)
- Koda – background vocals (track 4)
- Kim Cheol-sun – mixing (track 4)
- Young Chance – vocal directing (track 5)
- Dewain Whitmore Jr. – background vocals (track 5)
- Patrick "J. Que" Smith – background vocals (track 5)
- Jeong Eui-seok – digital editing (track 5), mixing (track 5)
- Manifest – background vocals (track 6)
- Jackson Morgan – background vocals (track 6)
- Jang Woo-young – recording (track 6)
- Chris Gehringer – mastering

== Charts ==
=== Weekly charts ===
Weekly chart performance for Good & Great
Chart (2023)	Peak position
Japanese Albums (Oricon)	35
Japanese Combined Albums (Oricon)	49
Japanese Hot Albums (Billboard Japan)	19
South Korean Albums (Circle)	4
UK Album Downloads (Official Charts)	95

=== Monthly charts ===
Monthly chart performance for Good & Great
Chart (2023)	Position
South Korean Albums (Circle)	14
