= Stephen Puth =

American singer (born 1994)

- Born: Stephen Carl Puth; April 13, 1994 (age 32)
- Origin: New Jersey, U.S.
- Genres: Pop
- Occupation: Singer-songwriter
- Labels: Arista, Columbia

Stephen Carl Puth (born April 13, 1994) is an American singer. He signed with Arista Records in 2018 and has released four singles, "Sexual Vibe", "Half Gone", "Look Away", and "Crying My Eyes Out". Puth began his career as a songwriter for other musicians. He is the younger brother of Charlie Puth.

== Early life and education ==
Stephen Carl Puth is from Rumson, New Jersey. His parents are Debra, a music teacher who also wrote commercials for HBO, and Charles Otto Puth Sr., a builder and real estate agent. Puth's father is Catholic and his mother is Jewish.

He graduated from the Hill School before studying history at Gettysburg College. During his last semester, his older brother, Charlie Puth suggested he write songs. He took time off of school to work full-time in finance but discovered that despite enjoying his coworkers, he was not great at the job. He started an internship in Los Angeles at a record company where he used a music editing program and wrote songs for musicians.

== Career ==
Puth began his career as a songwriter and signed a publishing deal before being offered a record deal. He has written songs for The Vamps, Pretty Much, Daniel Skye, Jack & Jack, and Stanaj. Puth signed with Arista Records in 2018. He released his debut single, "Sexual Vibe" in December 2018. Producer David Massey pushed Puth to try singing. He released ballad "Half Gone" on March 1, 2019. The music video for the song, which was inspired by his brother, was released in early March 2019. He released the pop song, "Look Away" on June 14, 2019, with the music video following on June 26. The video was directed by Jason Lester and was filmed in a desert outside of Los Angeles. The song was the first he had co-written with his brother. Puth was the opening act for Astrid S in Los Angeles and New York.

=== Artistry ===
Growing up, Puth was a fan of Van Morrison, Led Zeppelin, The Beatles, Carly Simon, James Taylor, Otis Redding, and Bill Withers. He was classically trained on the piano and taught himself how to play guitar.

== Discography ==
=== Singles ===
- "Sexual Vibe" (2018)
- "Half Gone" (2019)
- "Look Away" (2019) (#39 Billboard Pop Airplay)
- "Crying My Eyes Out" (2019)
- "Watching You Walk Away" (2020)
- "Whose Arms" (2020)
- "Close Your Eyes" (with Tribbs and Lucas Estrada) (2024)
- "River" (with Tribbs) (2024)

=== Songwriting credits ===
- "Hate that..." Key ft. Taeyeon (2021)
- "To. X" Taeyeon (2023)
