= Bad Love (EP) =

- Digital and "Space Ray Gun" version cover

EP by Key
- Released: September 27, 2021
- Studios: Doobdoob (Seoul); SM Big Shot (Seoul); SM LVYIN (Seoul); SM SSAM (Seoul); Sound Pool (Seoul)
- Genre: K-pop
- Length: 20:12
- Languages: Korean; English
- Labels: SM; Dreamus

Key chronology
Hologram (2018)	Bad Love (2021)	Gasoline (2022)

Singles from Bad Love
- 1. "Hate That..." Released: August 30, 2021; 2. "Bad Love" Released: September 27, 2021

Bad Love is the first Korean extended play by South Korean singer Key. It was released on September 27, 2021, through SM Entertainment. Marketed as his first "mini album" release, it consists of six songs, including the singles "Hate That..." and "Bad Love". The EP was Key's first solo release since returning from the military. Conceptually, it follows a retro space theme, inspired by the science fiction films of the 1980s and 1990s. It peaked at number three on South Korea's Gaon Album Chart and received positive reviews from music critics.

== Background ==
Key made his debut as a solo artist in 2018 with the studio album Face. This was followed by two more releases in quick succession, Japanese EP Hologram (2018) and Face reissue I Wanna Be (2019), after which he took a hiatus due to his compulsory military enlistment. On August 23, 2021, SM Entertainment announced the release of Key's new single, titled "Hate That...", on August 30, ahead of a new EP. The song, which is a duet with Key's labelmate Taeyeon, came almost three years after his previous releases. On September 6, it was revealed that the EP, titled Bad Love, would be released on September 27. It contains six tracks, including the lead single of the same name and "Hate That...".

Key had first conceptualised Bad Love 14 years previously. It marked the first time he had taken charge of the creative direction of an album, and he clashed with his label at various points during the production process. The EP follows a retro space theme, inspired by the science fiction films of the 1980s and 1990s. Key viewed it as the culmination of his interests and experiences, stating, "I finally became 'me'. I have a chance to show the audience that this is me. This album is the album-version of Key."

== Composition ==
Lead single "Bad Love" was written by Kenzie. It is described as a "dance-pop song that creates a retro mood with a strong synth sound and a lively beat". "Yellow Tape" is a dance-pop song that compares the process of getting to know someone to a profiler examining the scene of an incident. A layer of tension is added through the use of a siren sound at the beginning of the song, in addition to various other FX sounds. "Hate That..." is an R&B song with a sentimental guitar melody. The lyrics concern hoping an ex-partner isn't doing well after a break-up but still wanting to be remembered by them. Pop song "Helium" has an energetic beat, playful topline and funky bass riff. Written in English, it compares the excitement of being with a loved one to inhaling helium and floating into space. It features references to Judy Jetson and distorted sounds that resemble "alien growl[s]" and "robotic panting". The final two songs on the EP, "Saturday Night" and "Eighteen (End of My World)", feature lyrics written by Key. "Saturday Night" is an 80s-style disco song featuring synths and a rhythmic bass line. It is about navigating a break-up during the COVID-19 pandemic, and the lyrics describe the loneliness of "being lost in a sea of lovers and clubbers". "Eighteen (End of My World)" is a pop song with a warm, nostalgic atmosphere that Key described as a letter to his 18-year-old self. He explained, "When I debuted, I was 18, so I just wanted to cheer up 18-years-old Key. At the end of the song, [the lyrics] turn to, 'I would love to watch the end of my world with you.'"

== Release and promotion ==
Promotional materials, including video and image teasers, were revealed via Shinee's social media accounts beginning September 13, showcasing a retro space theme. Key debuted songs from the EP at his Beyond Live concert, Groks in the Keyland, on September 26. The concert was also broadcast live in theaters. On September 27, Key hosted a live broadcast on Shinee's YouTube channel to commemorate the EP's release. He promoted the EP with performances on M Countdown, Music Bank, Show! Music Core and Inkigayo. He also guested on various variety shows, including Comedy Big League, MMTG and Sixth Sense, as well as performing on You Hee-yeol's Sketchbook. On October 6, a performance video of "Bad Love" was released on YouTube.

== Critical reception ==
Professional ratings
Review scores
Source	Rating
NME	5/5 stars

Bad Love received generally positive reviews from critics. Abby Webster of NME gave it five stars, writing that it "is at its best when it leans into the strangeness and vast possibility presented by its 20th century inspirations". She named the title track as a particular highlight, stating that it "set the bar astronomically, unreachably high". Writing for Clash, Tássia Assis called the EP "one of the most ravishing releases of the year". Korean music critic Kim Yun-ha praised Key's vocal performance and his commitment to realising his creative vision. PopMatters critic Ana Clara Ribeiro described Bad Love as "electrifying". She opined that although it built on existing trends in pop music, it incorporated its retro influences "in such an involving way" that it was able to stand on its own merits.

=== Year-end lists ===
Bad Love on year-end lists
Critic/Publication	List	Rank	Ref.
Idology	Top 10 Albums of the Year	Placed	
NME	The 25 best Asian albums of 2021	8	
Nylon	The Top K-Pop Albums of 2021	Placed	
PopMatters	The 20 Best K-Pop Albums of 2021	2	
Rolling Stone India	10 Best K-Pop Albums of 2021	3	
South China Morning Post	25 Best K-pop Albums of 2021	2	

== Track listing ==
Bad Love track listing
No.	Title	Lyrics	Music	Arrangement	Length
1.	"Bad Love"	Kenzie	Kenzie; Adrian McKinnon	Kenzie	3:25
2.	"Yellow Tape"	Jo Yoon-kyung	Imlay; McKinnon; Rick Annema; Cimo Fränkel	Imlay	3:28
3.	"Hate That..." (featuring Taeyeon)	Hwang Yu-bin	Stephen Puth; Lauren Mandel	Puth; Eric Potapenko	3:05
4.	"Helium"	Coffee Clarence Jr.; Evan Bogart; realmeee; Sophiya	Sylvester Willy Sivertsen; Clarence; Bogart	Sivertsen; Clarence; Bogart	3:20
5.	"Saturday Night"	Key	Mich Hansen; Jacob Uchorczak; Danny Shah; Violet Skies	Cutfather & Ubizz	3:05
6.	"Eighteen (End of My World)"	Key	August Rigo; Jaicko Lawrence; Oluwayomi Emmanuel; Oredein	Rigo	3:46
Total length:					20:12

== Personnel ==
Credits adapted from the EP liner notes.

- Key – vocals, background vocals
- Kenzie – directing (track 1)
- Junny – background vocals (tracks 1, 4–5), vocal directing (track 4)
- Adrian McKinnon – background vocals (tracks 1–2)
- Lee Min-gyu – recording (tracks 1, 4–5), engineering for mix (tracks 3–4), mixing (track 3), digital editing (track 4)
- Jeong Yu-ra – digital editing (tracks 1–2, 5)
- No Min-ji – engineering for mix (tracks 1, 6)
- Nam Gung-jin – mixing (tracks 1, 4)
- Ju Chan-yang – vocal directing (track 2)
- On Seong-yun – recording (track 2)
- Kang Eun-ji – engineering for mix (tracks 2, 5), recording (tracks 3–4), digital editing (track 3)
- MasterKey – mixing (track 2)
- Kim Yeon-seo – vocal directing (track 3)
- Taeyeon – vocals (track 3), background vocals (track 3)
- Stephen Puth – background vocals (track 3)
- Lauren Mandel – background vocals (track 3)
- Jeong Ho-jin – recording (track 3)
- Coffee Clarence Jr. – background vocals (track 4)
- Deez – vocal directing (track 5)
- Lee Ji-hong – recording (tracks 5–6), mixing (track 5)
- Jeon Seung-woo – vocal directing (track 6)
- Heritage – background vocals (track 6)
- August Rigo – background vocals (track 6)
- Jang Woo-young – recording (track 6), digital editing (track 6)
- Kim Cheol-sun – mixing (track 6)
- Kwon Nam-woo – mastering

== Charts ==
=== Weekly charts ===
Weekly chart performance for Bad Love
Chart (2021)	Peak position
Japan Hot Albums (Billboard Japan)	16
Japanese Albums (Oricon)	28
South Korean Albums (Gaon)	3

=== Monthly charts ===
Monthly chart performance for Bad Love
Chart (2021)	Peak position
South Korean Albums (Gaon)	8

=== Year-end charts ===
Year-end chart performance for Bad Love
Chart (2021)	Position
South Korean Albums (Gaon)	83

== Release history ==
Release history and formats for Bad Love
Region	Date	Format	Label	Ref.
South Korea	September 27, 2021	CD; digital download; streaming	SM; Dreamus	
Various	September 27, 2021	Digital download; streaming	SM	
South Korea	October 5, 2021	Cassette tape	SM; Dreamus	
South Korea	February 28, 2022	LP	SM; Dreamus	
