= Gasoline (Key song) =

Single by Key

from the album Gasoline
- Language: Korean
- Released: August 30, 2022
- Studio: SM LVYIN Studio (Seoul)
- Genre: Hip hop; dance
- Length: 3:11
- Label: SM
- Composers: Kenzie; Moonshine; Keynon "KC" Moore; Ninos Hanna
- Lyricists: Key; Kenzie
- Producers: Moonshine; Kenzie

Key singles chronology
| "Bad Love" (2021) | "Gasoline" (2022) | "Killer" (2023) |

Music video
- "Gasoline" on YouTube

"Gasoline" (Korean: 가솔린; RR: Gasollin) is a song by South Korean singer Key. It served as the lead single for his second studio album Gasoline, and was released on August 30, 2022, through SM Entertainment. A hip hop dance song, "Gasoline" was written by Key, Kenzie, Moonshine, Keynon "KC" Moore and Ninos Hanna, and produced by Moonshine and Kenzie.

== Background ==
Key experienced difficulties finding a lead single for his second studio album, and therefore requested SM's in-house songwriter Kenzie write a song for him based on his specifications. According to Key, "Everything was in my brain. I explained the instrumental that I wanted, literally, with my mouth [makes beat sounds] and imitated the sounds. I explained all the concepts of the music video. And they made it into "Gasoline"." Key penned the lyrics himself at Kenzie's suggestion. The song was originally titled "A-list", but Key decided he preferred "Gasoline", despite 27 out of 30 SM staff voting against it.

== Composition ==
"Gasoline" is a hip hop dance song that combines chanting with brass and drum sounds. It has also been described as electro-trap, and features an "addictive hook" in the chorus. The production is "loud and boisterous" and layers "the electric sounds of 808s" with Key's vocals. In the lyrics, Key compares himself to the fiery power of gasoline to illustrate his desire to carve out his own path. He explained, "I heard the static spark can ignite gasoline vapors and cause a flash fire. I wanted to show my energy and confidence." Divyansha Dongre of Rolling Stone India described the song as having a "celebratory atmosphere", adding that it conveys the message that Key's ambitions "are not driven by accolades or trophies and are instead fueled by sheer passion and dedication to his craft."

== Release and promotion ==
"Gasoline" was announced as the album's lead single on August 9, 2022. Key performed the song for the first time at the SM Town Live 2022: SMCU Express concert at Suwon World Cup Stadium. Ilgan Sports reporter Jung Jin-young praised his performance, stating, "I thought "Bad Love" was the best song in the world. Until I saw the performance of "Gasoline". A music video teaser was uploaded to Shinee's YouTube channel on August 29, and the song was released alongside the music video the next day. Key promoted the song with performances on M Countdown, Music Bank, Show! Music Core and Inkigayo.

== Music video ==
Key spent two days developing the concept for "Gasoline", with the goal of creating something that had not been seen before in his agency. He wanted to embody the image of a god, and initially received feedback that the concept was too aggressive, before eventually obtaining his company's approval. With regard to the styling, his aim was to create "a look that can impact and influence all genders". In the music video, Key portrays a character with "celestial characteristics", and performs the choreography on various sets including a desert, a giant birdcage and a throne room, all while wearing a series of elaborate costumes. The video closes with him surrounded by a ring of fire.

== Critical reception ==
Sarina Bhutani of MTV described Key as "an artist who refuses complacency". She praised him for "pushing his boundaries as both a sonic and visual artist", noting that "the scope in which he presents his worldview widens each time he returns". Writing for South China Morning Post, Tamar Herman described the song as "performance art put to music at its very best".

=== Year-end lists ===
"Gasoline" on year-end lists
| Critic/Publication | List | Rank | Ref. |
|---|---|---|---|
| CNN Philippines | Our favorite K-pop songs of 2022 | —N/a | |
| Dazed | The best K-pop tracks of 2022 | 10 | |
| Teen Vogue | The 79 Best K-Pop Songs of 2022 | —N/a | |

== Credits and personnel ==
Credits adapted from the liner notes of Gasoline.

Studio

- SM LVYIN Studio – recording
- SM Yellow Tail Studio – digital editing
- SM Blue Ocean Studio – mixing
- 821 Sound – mastering

Personnel

- Key – vocals, lyrics, background vocals
- Kenzie – producer, lyrics, composition, arrangement, vocal directing
- Moonshine – producer, composition, arrangement
- Keynon "KC" Moore – composition, background vocals
- Ninos Hanna – composition, background vocals
- Xydo – background vocals
- Lee Ji-hong – recording
- No Min-ji – digital editing
- Kim Cheol-sun – mixing
- Kwon Nam-woo – mastering

== Charts ==
Chart performance for "Gasoline"
| Chart (2022) | Peak position |
|---|---|
| South Korea (Circle) | 39 |

== Release history ==
Release dates and formats for "Gasoline"
| Region | Date | Format | Label | Ref. |
|---|---|---|---|---|
| Various | August 30, 2022 | Digital download; streaming | SM; Dreamus | |
