= Bad Love (Key song) =

Single by Key

from the EP Bad Love
- Language: Korean
- Released: September 27, 2021
- Studio: SM Big Shot Studio (Seoul)
- Genre: Dance-pop
- Length: 3:25
- Label: SM Entertainment
- Songwriters: Kenzie; Adrian McKinnon
- Producer: Kenzie

Key singles chronology
"Hate That..." (2021)	"Bad Love" (2021)	"Gasoline" (2022)

Music video
- "Bad Love" on YouTube

"Bad Love" is a song recorded by South Korean singer Key serving as the second single for his 2021 extended play of the same name. It was released on September 27, 2021, through SM Entertainment as the album's lead single.

== Background and release ==
On September 6, 2021, SM Entertainment announced the upcoming release date of Key's first Korean-language extended play, Bad Love, led by the single of the same name. The first single from the EP, "Hate That...", had already been released a month prior. Key showcased the song for the first time at his Beyond Live concert, Groks in the Keyland, on September 26, 2021, before releasing it alongside the album on the next day. Two music video teasers were released on September 25 and September 26, respectively. The song together with the music video were released on September 27.

== Composition ==
"Bad Love" was written by Kenzie and Adrian McKinnon, while Kenzie produced the song. Musically, the song is described as a dance-pop song that creates a retro mood with a strong synth sound and a lively beat. The lyrics revolve around "a tale of ecstatic love turned toxic".

== Critical reception ==
"Bad Love" on year-end lists
Critic/Publication	List	Rank	Ref.
Bollywood Hungama	25 Korean Songs that Defined 2021	Placed	
Dazed	The best K-pop tracks of 2021	2	
Marie Claire	The 20 Best New K-Pop Songs of 2021	Placed	
NME	The 25 best K-pop songs of 2021	3	
Paper	The 40 Best K-Pop Songs of 2021	5	
PhilStar Life	21 K-pop Title Tracks That Defined 2021	20	
The Ringer	The Best K-pop Songs of 2021	1	
Teen Vogue	21 Best K-Pop Music Videos of 2021	Placed	
Tone Deaf	The best K-pop songs of 2021	Placed	

== Accolades ==
Music program wins for "Bad Love"
Program	Date	Ref.
Show! Music Core (MBC)	October 9, 2021	

== Credits and personnel ==
Credits adapted from the liner notes for Bad Love.

Studio

- SM Big Shot Studio – recording
- SM Yellow Tail Studio – engineered for mix
- SM Starlight Studio – digital editing
- SM Concert Hall Studio – mixing
- 821 Sound – mastering

Personnel

- Key – vocals, background vocals
- Kenzie – producer, lyrics, composition, arrangement, vocal directing
- Adrian McKinnon – composition
- Junny – background vocals
- Lee Min-kyu – recording
- Jeong Yoo-ra – digital editing
- Noh Min-ji – engineered for mix
- Nam Koong-jin – mixing
- Kwon Nam-woo – mastering

== Charts ==
Weekly chart performance for "Bad Love"
Chart (2021)	Peak position
South Korea (Gaon)	34
South Korea (K-pop Hot 100)	87
US World Digital Song Sales (Billboard)	13

== Release history ==
Release history and formats for "Bad Love"
Region	Date	Format	Label	Ref.
Various	September 27, 2021	Digital download; streaming	SM Entertainment; Dreamus	
