= Key (entertainer) =

South Korean singer (born 1991)

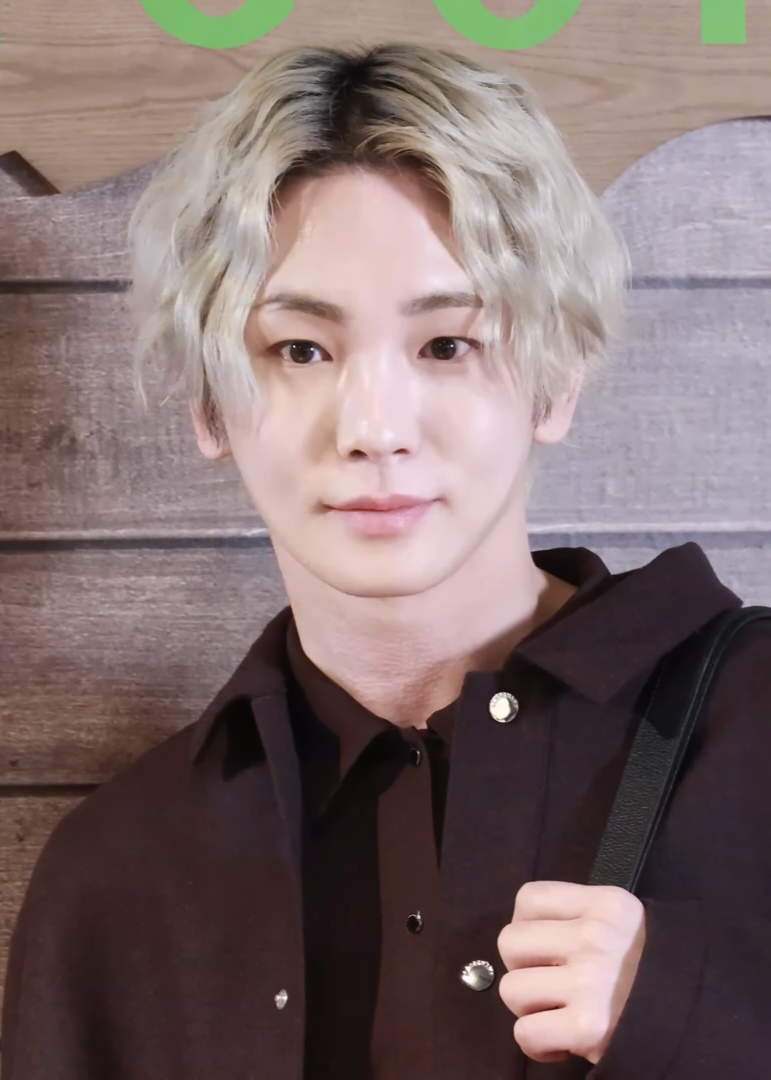
- Key in November 2025
- Born: Kim Ki-bum; September 23, 1991 (age 35); Daegu, South Korea
- Education: Myongji University; Woosuk University
- Occupations: Singer; songwriter; television personality
- Musical career
- Genres: K-pop; PBR&B; J-pop; electronic music
- Instrument: Vocals
- Years active: 2008–present
- Labels: SM; Universal
- Member of: Shinee; SM Town
- Formerly of: Toheart
- Website: Official website

Korean name
- Hangul: 김기범
- Hanja: 金起範
- RR: Gim Gibeom
- MR: Kim Kibŏm

Signature
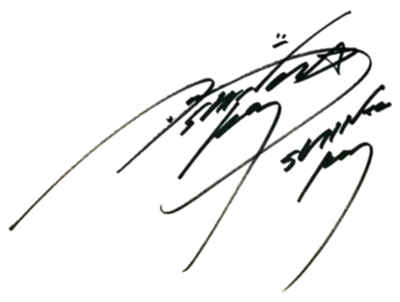

Kim Ki-bum (Korean: 김기범; born September 23, 1991), known professionally as Key (키), is a South Korean singer, songwriter and television personality. Born and raised in Daegu, South Korea, he joined SM Entertainment in 2005 after a successful audition. In May 2008, Key debuted as a member of South Korean boy band Shinee, who later went on to become one of the best-selling artists in South Korea. Key is widely recognized as a singer and dancer, but he has also ventured into different careers, notably as a television personality.

As a singer, he has collaborated with various artists, and formed the duo Toheart with Woohyun of Infinite. He made his debut as a soloist in November 2018 with the release of the digital single "Forever Yours", and his first studio album, Face, was released later that month. Subsequent releases include Bad Love (2021), Gasoline (2022), Good & Great (2023), Pleasure Shop (2024), and Hunter (2025). Key has also contributed to songwriting for himself and Shinee. As an actor, he has been cast in multiple musicals, such as Bonnie & Clyde (2013), Zorro (2014), and Chess (2015), and in television dramas like Drinking Solo (2016) and The Guardians (2017).

In 2015, Key became active as a fashion designer and took part in numerous projects. For instance, he collaborated with Bridge Shop House to design Shinee concert outfits, and worked with model Irene Kim and the brand Charm's to design fashion apparel. Due to the success of his works, Key was appointed as a fashion director for the group. Since 2020, he has gained prominence as a television personality, appearing on the variety shows DoReMi Market and I Live Alone as a cast member. He has received the Excellence Award from the MBC Entertainment Awards in recognition of his variety performances.

== Life and career ==
=== 1991–2011: Early life and career beginnings ===
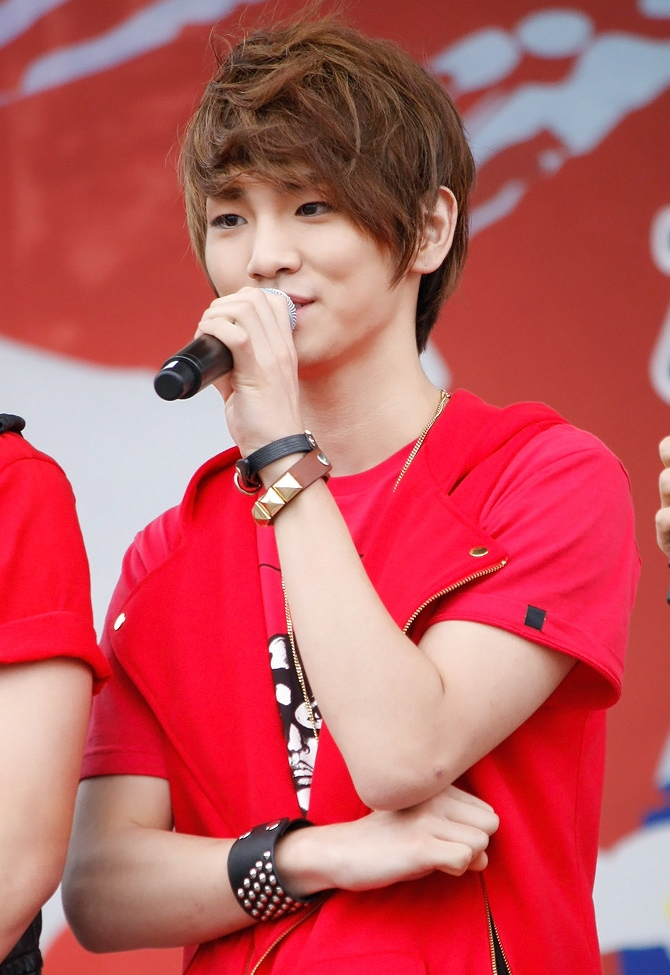
Key in 2010

Key was born on September 23, 1991, in Daegu, South Korea, as an only child. His mother is a nurse and his father is a financial investment advisor. Key was raised by his grandmother from birth; his mother was sick after giving birth and his father was busy with work. His parents wanted him to pursue a medical career, but he aspired to become a singer instead and secretly studied dance at school. In 2005, he auditioned for SM Entertainment behind his parents' backs and was accepted as a trainee; his parents eventually accepted his decision after three sleepless nights. Key took a two-hour train ride to Seoul every weekend to train, returning to Daegu at the end. In 2008, he was chosen as a member of the group Shinee. The group released their first extended play, Replay, on May 22, peaking at number eight on the charts. They held their first performance on May 25, 2008, on the SBS program Inkigayo.

Key participated in labelmate Xiah's solo performance of "Xiahtic" in TVXQ's concert 2009: The 3rd Asia Tour Mirotic in Seoul. In 2010, he featured on the song "Healing" on TRAX's EP Let You Go, and on Girls' Generation's song "Boys & Girls" for their second studio album, Oh!. He was a cast member of the show Raising Idol along with Dongho from U-KISS and Thunder from MBLAQ. In 2012, Key collaborated with Leeteuk of Super Junior on a song called "Bravo" for the drama History of a Salaryman. He also took part in Exo's song "Two Moons" on their debut EP, Mama, and BoA's song "One Dream" as the theme song for SBS K-pop Star with labelmate Henry of Super Junior-M.

=== 2012–2015: Toheart and theatrical debut ===
In 2012, Key was cast as Frank Abagnale Jr. in the Korean production of Broadway musical Catch Me If You Can, marking his theatrical debut. He rotated the role with Um Ki-joon, Kim Jeong-hoon, Park Gwang-hyun and labelmate Kyuhyun. The musical ran from March 28 to June 10 at the Blue Square, Samsung Card Hall, in Hannam-dong, Seoul. In October, it was announced that Key would participate in the return of the musical. The production started on December 14, 2012, and continued until February 9, 2013, at the Opera House in the Seongnam Arts Center. Key also made a cameo appearance in SBS sitcom Salamander Guru and The Shadows.

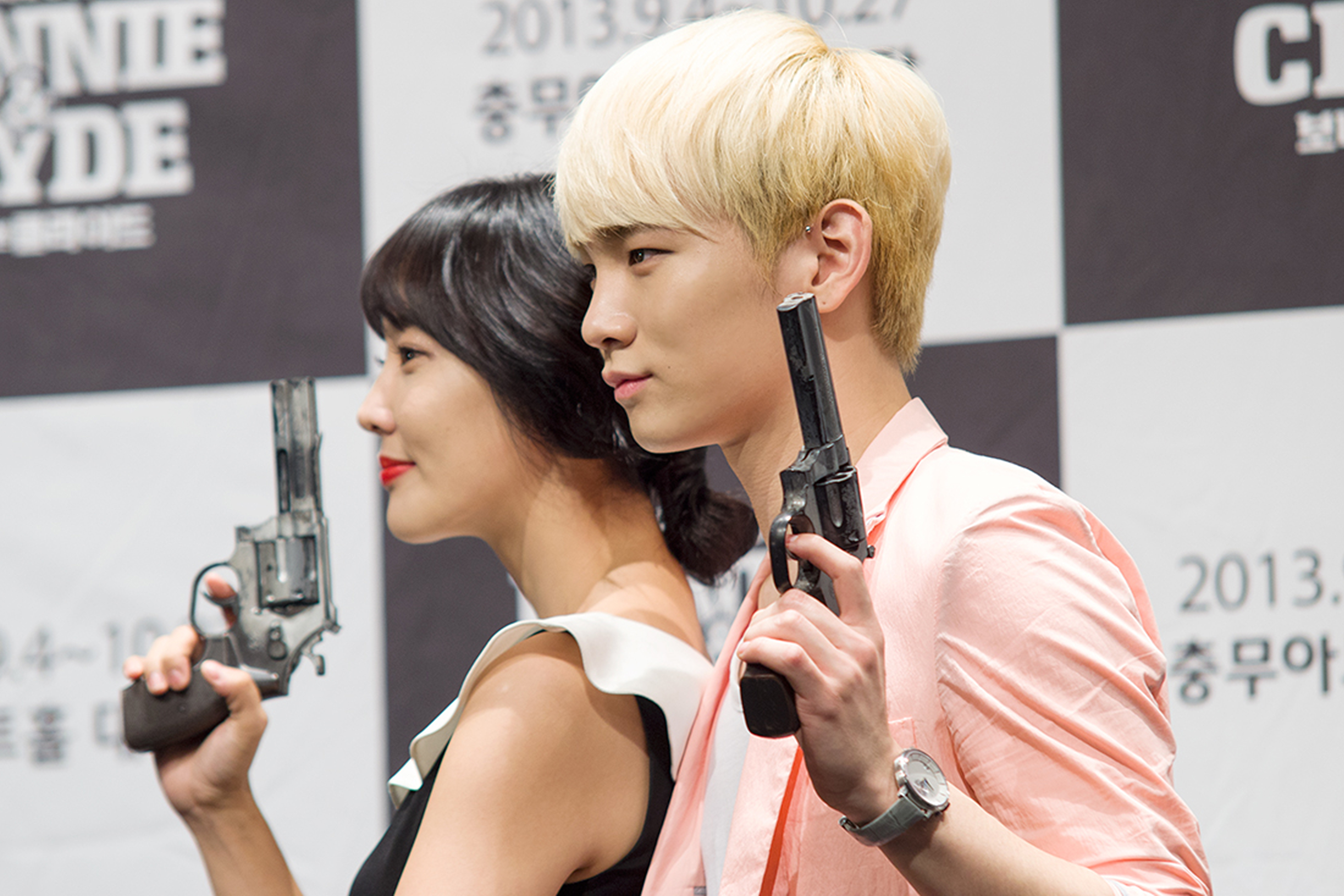
Dana Hong and Key at the press conference of musical Bonnie & Clyde on August 19, 2013.

On July 18, 2013, it was announced that Key was cast as Clyde in the Korean production of Bonnie & Clyde, alongside the cast Kim Min-jong, Um Ki-joon, Dana of The Grace, and Hyungsik of ZE:A. The performance ran at the Chungmu Art Hall in Seoul from September 4 until October 27, 2013. Shortly after, he was cast in The Three Musketeers as D'Artagnan.

In 2014, Key formed the duo Toheart with Woohyun from Infinite, a collaboration between SM Entertainment and Woollim Entertainment. According to the members, it was their idea to form a duo since they were close friends, but they weren't thinking of a musical collaboration, instead of photoshoots and similar activities. The duo was well received, winning the Popularity Award at the 29th Golden Disc Awards. Jeff Benjamin from Billboard praised their vocals, as well as their choreography and on-screen charisma. In the same year, Key was cast as the lead role in the musical Zorro, sharing the role with singer Wheesung and Beast's Yoseob. Zorro ran from August 27 to October 26 at the Chungmu Art Hall in Seoul. Key also participated in the MBC variety show We Got Married Global Edition. He was partnered with Alissa Yagi, a Japanese model.

In January 2015, Key joined the cast of SM Entertainment's hologram musical School Oz. In March 2015, Key and CNBLUE's Jung-shin were appointed as the main presenters of Mnet's M Countdown. In the same year, Key collaborated with Axodus, a duo formed by Don Spike and DJ Hanmin. Key provided vocals for the track "Hold On", which they performed together at the Ansan Valley Rock Festival on July 25, 2015. He took further musical roles in Chess and In the Heights, the latter of which was later performed with Japanese subtitles at Kanagawa Arts Theatre in Yokohama in 2016. Key starred in his first play as Byeong-gu in Save the Green Planet!, based on the 2003 film of the same name. He also had his own web show entitled Key's Know How produced by Mnet.

=== 2016–2017: Acting roles ===
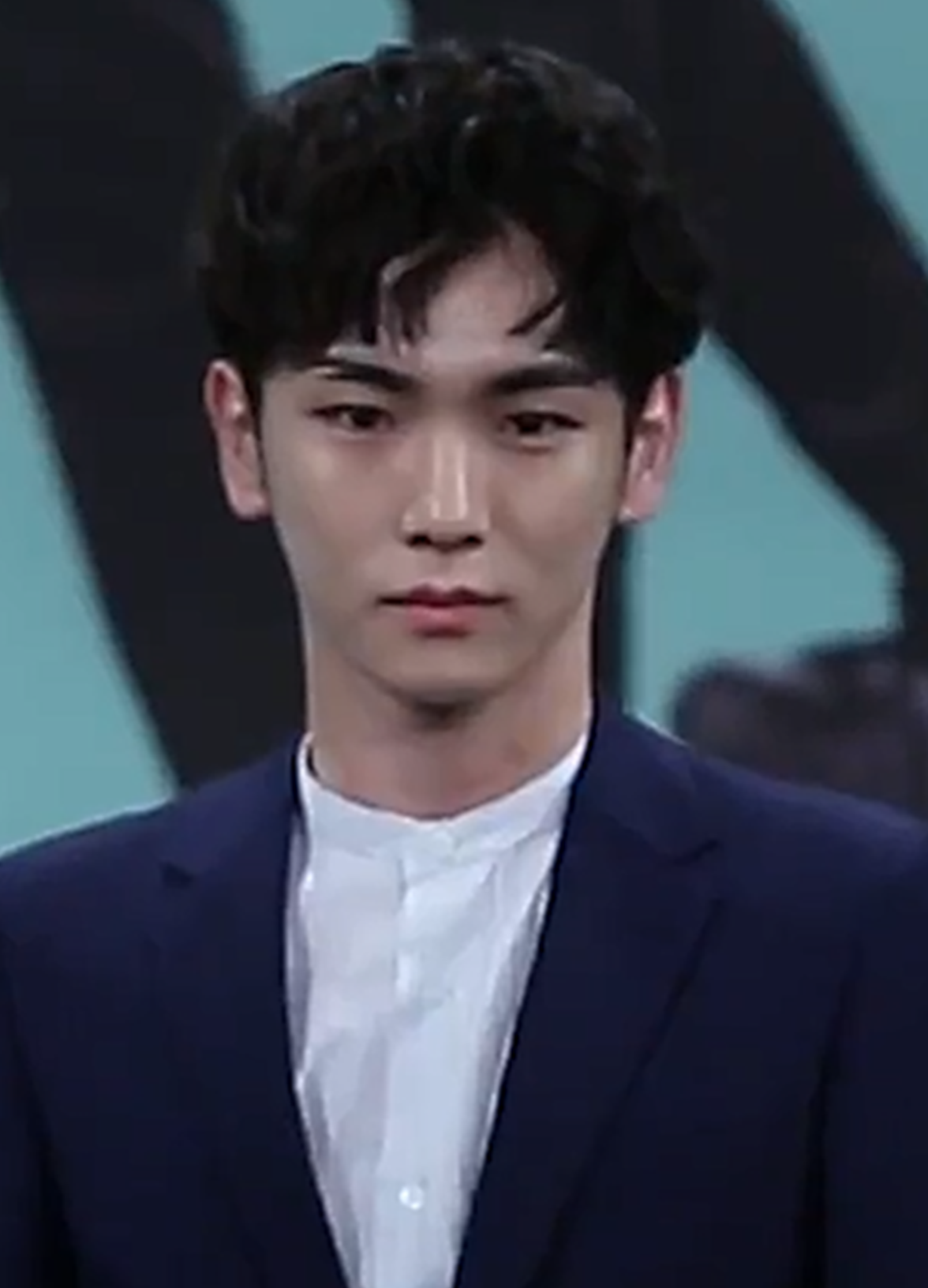
Key at the press conference of The Guardians in May 2017

In September 2016, Key made his official acting debut in the tvN drama Drinking Solo which aired from September 5 to October 25. He took the role of a student who had been studying for the civil service exam for three years. Although this was Key's first time acting in a television series, his acting was well received by the production team, stating: "Key is someone who works hard. He prepared a lot beforehand and as an actor, he comprehensively analysed his character role. He is receiving much praise and love from the staff. Despite having no experience in dramas at the time of his audition, his acting gave off a very fresh vibe. Furthermore, his acting and his enunciation were good and so we decided to cast him."

In April 2017, Key was announced as one of the main characters for the new MBC drama The Guardians. In the drama, Key plays the role of Gong Kyung-soo, a skater and a hacker whose mother went missing due to a crime and received positive reviews for his acting skills. He subsequently received the Best New Actor Award at the 2017 Grimae Awards.

=== 2018–2019: Solo debut and military enlistment ===
Key joined the variety show DoReMi Market as a cast member in February 2018. He featured on Years & Years' remix of their single "If You're Over Me", which was released on July 6, 2018. Key sings in both Korean and English over the original melody alongside the British pop trio. The original Korean verses reflect the song's overall meaning, as Key asks a lover to stop pushing-and-pulling and were written by the singer himself.

On October 11, 2018, SM Entertainment announced that Key would make his solo debut in late November. Shortly after, on October 20, Key performed a special stage at Charm's fashion show during Seoul Fashion Week. He performed a new song called "Chemicals", which was later included in his album. Two weeks later, the single "Forever Yours", featuring Key's close friend and former Sistar member Soyou, was pre-released on November 6 along with a music video. On November 26, his first studio album, titled Face, was released, alongside a music video for the lead single "One of Those Nights", featuring Crush. Out of the ten songs included in the album, Key wrote the lyrics to four of them himself.

Following his solo debut, Key released his first Japanese extended play, Hologram, on December 26, 2018. The EP contains a total of five tracks, including title track "Hologram" and a Japanese version of "One of Those Nights". To celebrate his Japanese debut, Key held two live shows, titled Key Land, in Kobe and Yokohama on December 22 and December 25, respectively. His first solo concert in South Korea, titled The Agit: Key Land, was held in February 2019 in Seoul and consisted of 11 sold-out performances.

I Wanna Be, a repackaged version of Face, was released on March 4, 2019; the album was preceded by the single "Cold", featuring Hanhae, and the title track "I Wanna Be", which featured Soyeon of (G)I-dle. On the same day the album was released, Key enlisted for his mandatory military service as a member of the military band.

=== 2020–present: Solo albums and variety roles ===
Key went on his final military leave on September 24, 2020, without returning to the army due to military protocols regarding the COVID-19 pandemic, before officially being discharged on October 7. He returned as a regular cast member for DoReMi Market on its November 21 episode. In July 2021, he joined I Live Alone as a cast member following a guest appearance several months prior. On August 30, 2021, Key released the single "Hate That...", featuring Taeyeon, serving as the pre-release for his upcoming album in September. He held an online Beyond Live concert, titled Groks in the Keyland, on September 26. The concert was also broadcast live in theaters. His first Korean extended play, Bad Love, was released on September 27, with the lead single of the same name. On October 9, Key received his first music show win as a solo artist on MBC's Show! Music Core.

On August 30, 2022, Key released his second studio album Gasoline, with the lead single of the same name. He held a concert titled G.O.A.T. (Greatest of All Time) in the Keyland at Jangchung Arena in Seoul on October 22–23, and at Pia Arena MM in Yokohama on November 19–20. He held additional performances in Osaka in March 2023. On February 13, he released a reissue of Gasoline titled Killer. His second Korean EP, Good & Great, was released on September 11. He held a concert titled 2024 Keyland On: And On at the SK Olympic Handball Gymnasium in Seoul on January 27–28, 2024. The tour later extended to various countries across Asia, including Japan, Indonesia and Thailand. He appeared in TVING's Crime Scene Returns in February 2024. He released his first Japanese single, "Tongue Tied", digitally on June 26. The physical edition was released on August 7. His third Korean EP, Pleasure Shop, was released on September 23.

In July 2025, Key co-hosted the idol talk show Salon de Idol alongside BtoB member Changsub. The show was a spin-off of Salon Drip, and reunited Key with DoReMi Market producer Lee Tae-kyung. On August 11, he released his third studio album, Hunter, consisting of ten songs, including the lead single of the same name. He embarked on a concert tour, titled 2025 Keyland: Uncanny Valley, on September 26, beginning with shows in Asia. He later expanded the tour to cover the United States for the first time. He began hosting a web series called The Closet Detective: Reboot, in which he explored the closets of various guests.

In December 2025, while on tour in the United States, Key became linked to a woman known as the "injection aunt", who was accused of practicing medicine without a license. Pictures of Key's dog and home appeared on the woman's social media accounts, leading to public backlash. In a statement, SM Entertainment said that Key had first met the woman at a clinic in Gangnam and was unaware that she was operating without a medical license. They said that he received treatment both at the clinic and at home, which he did not know was inappropriate, and that he was "deeply regretful of his ignorance". Key stepped down from all of his television shows, and pulled out of hosting the MBC Entertainment Awards.

== Personal life and education ==
Key represented Yeong Shin Middle School in his hometown as a water-skier and competed in water-skiing competitions. He graduated from Myongji University with a degree in Film and Musicals. He attended Woosuk University for his postgraduate degree, majoring in Culture and Education Contents Development. He participated in a project on youth self-concept development started by students in his major. He conducted special seminars at Iksan Namseong Middle School, North Jeolla Province, and Gimje Girls' Middle School in Seoul. His thesis is titled "The Influence of Styling Education on Appearance Satisfaction and Self-Esteem of Korean Adolescents".

== Other ventures ==
=== Fashion ===
"The important thing is to not be bound by style in and of itself, but one attitude when it comes to fashion. Matching a fashion item to my own style in and of itself is fun." — Key

Key is considered one of the best dressed men in his country. His "unique and unconventional" style often mixes patterns and colors. In the media, his fashion has been compared to that of fellow idol G-Dragon; both are known to eschew trends in favor of pursuing their own distinct style. Key has stated that he enjoys trying new things to look different from others and that instead of being constrained by fashion, he cares more about the attitude towards fashion. He views fashion as a form of self-expression and prefers not to distinguish between masculine and feminine styles. Kim Eun-joo, a professor at the University of Seoul, has cited him as an example of non-traditional gender performance.

Key has ventured into the fashion industry. For instance, he collaborated with designer Ko Tae-yong on self-designed sweatshirts depicting his dogs and sold them for charity. In addition, he was appointed one of SM Entertainment's fashion directors and has been designing Shinee's concert outfits since 2015. The costumes for Shinee's 2015 single "View" were based on Key's ideas, adopting a vintage, skater-inspired aesthetic at a time when other groups mostly wore uniforms. In 2016, Key collaborated with Japanese illustrator Bridge Ship House for Shinee's fifth Korean concert tour Shinee World V. His primary goal was to achieve a balance between Shinee's identity as a group and each member's individual identities. Key also became a special editor for the Korean Elle, sharing his personal lifestyle in a column called "Key Story", which was released bi-weekly by the magazine. In it, he shared tips on coloured contact lenses, cameras, applications, and more. In March 2017, Key worked with model Irene Kim to design new products for fashion brand Charm's.

=== Endorsements ===
Key has endorsed a number of brands, starting with Jill Stuart Accessory in 2016. A representative explained that Key was chosen as a model because he had promoted professionally in a variety of areas such as music and broadcasting, which showed his artistic side, and because he fit the brand's "sensual and trendy style". In 2021, he was selected as a model for health and beauty store Olive Young alongside labelmate Taeyeon, in a campaign targeting younger consumers. He also launched a skincare line named Key: Face in collaboration with Youlief, for which he personally designed the products.

He has been appointed an ambassador for make-up brand Espoir, health supplement MgLab, lifestyle brand Longtake and laundry detergent Perwoll. In 2025, he collaborated with Hello Kitty on a line of products featuring characters from Key's albums. He has featured in advertising campaigns for McDonald's and Google Gemini.

=== Philanthropy ===
Key is a supporter of World Vision. In 2009, he began sponsoring four children living in Uganda, India, Ethiopia and Bosnia, regularly sending them gifts and letters. He later donated 2.113 tons of rice and 550 coal briquettes, sent to him by fans during his run in Catch Me If You Can, to World Vision, which he asked to be directed to undernourished children and elderly people. He collaborated with designer Ko Tae-yong on a line of sweatshirts depicting his dogs. All proceeds (approximately 12.5 million won) were donated to the Animal Freedom Union. Key participated, alongside his SM Entertainment labelmates, in the 2016 "Make a Promise" campaign organised by UNICEF and Louis Vuitton, whereby 40% of the proceeds were donated through UNICEF to children in need. In 2022, he donated products from his Youlief skincare line worth 12 million won to the Korean Unwed Mothers' Families Association. He donated 50 million won to help residents of his hometown recover from the March 2025 South Korea wildfires.

Key has made several donations to Kyungpook National University Hospital, where his mother was employed as a nurse. He visited the hospital in 2019 ahead of his military enlistment and made a donation of 10 million won to support treatment costs. In 2023, an online commenter drew attention in the media after thanking Key for covering the cost of their son's blood-cancer medication. Key made a further donation of 50 million won to commemorate his mother's retirement.

== Discography ==
- Face (2018)
- Gasoline (2022)
- Hunter (2025)

=== Songwriting credits ===
All songwriting credits are adapted from the Korea Music Copyright Association.

List of songs credited as lyricist
Song	Year	Artist	Album	Co-written with
"Get Down"	2009	Shinee	2009, Year of Us	Minho, JQ, Bigtone, Ryan S. Jhun, Script Shepherd, Antwann Frost
"Get It"	2010	Shinee	Hello	Ceejay, Gilme, Minho
"Girls, Girls, Girls"	2013	Shinee	Dream Girl – The Misconceptions of You	Jeon Gan-di, Minho
"Orgel" (오르골)	2013	Shinee	Why So Serious? – The Misconceptions of Me	Jonghyun, Minho
"Odd Eye"	2015	Shinee	Odd	Jonghyun
"Alive"	2015	Shinee	Odd	Kim Eana, MC Meta
"Don't Let Me Go" (투명 우산)	2016	Shinee	1 of 1	Jo Yoon-kyung, Minho
"Don't Stop"	2016	Shinee	1 of 1	Jonghyun, Minho
"Good Evening" (데리러 가)	2018	Shinee	The Story of Light EP.1	Jo Yoon-kyung, Minho
"You & I" (안녕)	2018	Shinee	The Story of Light EP.1	—N/a
"Our Page" (네가 남겨둔 말)	2018	Shinee	The Story of Light EP.3	Shinee, Kenzie
"I Will Fight" (feat. Vinxen)	2018	Key	Face	Vinxen
"Easy to Love"	2018	Key	Face	JQ, Moon Hee-yeon
"The Duty of Love" (미워)	2018	Key	Face	—N/a
"This Life"	2018	Key	Face	—N/a
"Cold" (feat. Hanhae)	2019	Key	I Wanna Be	Cody J, Hanhae
"Saturday Night"	2021	Key	Bad Love	—N/a
"Eighteen (End of My World)"	2021	Key	Bad Love	—N/a
"Gasoline" (가솔린)	2022	Key	Gasoline	Kenzie
"G.O.A.T (Greatest of All Time)"	2022	Key	Gasoline	Kang Eun-jeong
"I Can't Sleep"	2022	Key	Gasoline	—N/a
"Proud"	2022	Key	Gasoline	—N/a
"Mirror, Mirror"	2023	Key	Good & Great	—N/a
"Pleasure Shop"	2024	Key	Pleasure Shop	Jo Yoon-kyung, Lee Hyung-suk (PNP), Park Tae-won

== Filmography ==
=== Film ===
Year	Title	Role	Notes	Ref.
2007	Attack on the Pin-Up Boys	Backup dancer	Cameo	
2012	I Am	Himself	SM Town documentary	
2015	SM Town The Stage	Himself	SM Town concert film	
2016	Seoul Fashion	Himself	Documentary; collaboration between JTBC and CeCi	
2019	Hit-and-Run Squad	Dong-soo		

=== Television ===
Year	Title	Role	Notes	Ref.
2011	Moon Night '90	Lee Hyun-do	Deux episode	
2012	Salamander Guru and The Shadows	Himself	Cameo	
2016	Drinking Solo	Kim Ki-bum		
2017	The Guardians	Gong Kyung-soo		

=== Variety shows ===
Year	Title	Role	Notes	Ref.
2010	Raising Idol	Cast member	with Dongho from U-KISS and Thunder from MBLAQ	
2014	7 Hungry Houseguests	Cast member	Ethiopia Episode	
2014	Stargazing	Cast member	with Kang Ho-dong	
2014	We Got Married Global Edition	Himself	with Alissa Yagi	
2015	Make An Order	Co-host	with Jun Hyun-moo	
2015	My Little Television	Cast member	broadcast on Lifestyle & Pet	
2015–2017	M Countdown	Host		
2017	Master Key	Cast member		
2018	Keyword#BoA	Himself		
2018	Breakers	Host		
2018	Cheongdam Key-chin	Host		
2018–2019 2020–2025	DoReMi Market	Cast member		
2021–2025	I Live Alone	Cast member		
2021–2023	SBS Gayo Daejeon	Host		
2023	Boys Planet	Star master	Episodes 8–10	
2024	Crime Scene Returns	Cast member	Season 4	
2025	Salon de Idol	Host	with Changsub	

=== Web shows ===
Year	Title	Notes	Ref.
2015	Key's Knowhow	broadcast on Mnet's official YouTube channel	
2018	Key-log		
2021	TaengKey Box	with Taeyeon	
2025	The Closet Detective: Reboot		

== Theatre ==
Year	Title	Role	Notes	Ref.
2012	Catch Me If You Can	Frank Abagnale, Jr.	Korean version	
2013	Bonnie and Clyde	Clyde Chestnut Barrow	Korean version	
2013–14	The Three Musketeers	D'Artagnan	Korean version	
2014	Zorro	Zorro	Korean version	
2015	School Oz	David	Hologram musical	
2015	Chess	Anatoly Sergievsky	Korean version	
2015–16	In the Heights	Usnavi	Korean version	
2016–17	Save the Green Planet!	Byeong-gu	Korean version	

== Concerts ==
=== Headlining ===
- Key Land (2018)
- The Agit: Key Land (2019)
- G.O.A.T. (Greatest of All Time) in the Keyland (2022–2023)
- 2024 Keyland On: And On (2024)
- 2025 Keyland: Uncanny Valley (2025)

== Awards and nominations ==
Name of the award ceremony, year presented, category, nominee of the award, and the result of the nomination
Award ceremony	Year	Category	Nominee / Work	Result	Ref.
Baeksang Arts Awards	2022	Best Male Variety Performer	Key	Nominated	
Baeksang Arts Awards	2022	TikTok Popularity Award	Key	Nominated	
Brand Consumer Loyalty Award	2021	Male Variety – Idol	Key	Won	
Brand Consumer Loyalty Award	2022	Best Male Idol Entertainer	Key	Won	
Brand Consumer Loyalty Award	2023	Male Solo Singer	Key	Won	
Brand Consumer Loyalty Award	2025	Best Male Idol Entertainer	Key	Won	
Brand of the Year Awards	2021	Entertainer Idol of the Year – Male	Key	Won	
Brand of the Year Awards	2022	Best Male Idol Entertainer	Key	Won	
Brand of the Year Awards	2023	Best Male Idol Entertainer	Key	Won	
Grimae Awards	2017	Best New Actor	The Guardians	Won	
MAMA Awards	2024	Song of the Year	"Pleasure Shop"	Nominated	
MAMA Awards	2024	Best Dance Performance – Male Solo	"Pleasure Shop"	Nominated	
MAMA Awards	2024	Fans' Choice Male	Key	Nominated	
MAMA Awards	2025	Song of the Year	"Hunter"	Nominated	
MAMA Awards	2025	Best Dance Performance – Male Solo	"Hunter"	Nominated	
MBC Drama Awards	2017	Best New Actor	The Guardians	Nominated	
MBC Entertainment Awards	2021	Best Couple Award	Key (with Kian84); I Live Alone	Nominated	
MBC Entertainment Awards	2021	Popularity Award	Key	Won	
MBC Entertainment Awards	2022	Excellence Award, Variety Category – Male	I Live Alone	Won	
MBC Entertainment Awards	2024	Special Producer Award	I Live Alone	Won	
Seoul Music Awards	2024	Bonsang Award	Key	Nominated	
Seoul Music Awards	2024	Popularity Award	Key	Nominated	
Seoul Music Awards	2024	K-Wave Special Award	Key	Nominated	
Seoul Music Awards	2024	Male Singer – Solo	Key	Nominated	
