= Face (Key album) =

Studio album by Key
- Released: November 26, 2018
- Recorded: 2018
- Studios: Doobdoob (Seoul); Hannambling (Seoul); InGrid (Seoul); OREO (Seoul); SM Big Shot (Seoul); SM LVYIN (Seoul); SM Yellow Tail (Seoul); Sound Pool (Seoul)
- Genres: K-pop; pop; electronica
- Length: 34:28
- Language: Korean
- Labels: SM; IRIVER
- Producers: Lee Soo-man; John Asher; Bhav; C-no; Choi Jin-suk; Noah Conrad; Tom Doherty; Vaughn Elsas; Ryan S. Jhun; DallasK; Daecolm; Deez; Imlay; Valentino Khan; Woong Kim; LDN Noise; Rice N' Peas; R!OT; Skrillex; Tak; Jake Torrey; Thomas Troelsen; Chris Wahle

Key chronology
Face (2018)	Hologram (2018)

Singles from Face
- 1. "Forever Yours" Released: November 6, 2018; 2. "One of Those Nights" Released: November 26, 2018

Repackaged edition cover
- Digital album cover for I Wanna Be

Singles from I Wanna Be
- 1. "I Wanna Be (feat. Jeon So-yeon)" Released: March 4, 2019

Face is the debut studio album by South Korean singer Key. It was released on November 26, 2018, through SM Entertainment. "One of Those Nights" and "Forever Yours" (featuring Crush and Soyou, respectively) served as the album's lead singles.

On February 25, 2019, it was announced that the album would be repackaged as I Wanna Be on March 4.

== Background and release ==
On October 11, 2018, SM Entertainment announced that Key would be the third member of Shinee to make a solo debut, with an estimated release date of November. On November 7, 2018, the album's first lead single, "Forever Yours" was released, featuring former Sistar member, Soyou.

The first image teasers for the album dropped on November 19, along with the title and tracklist. The teaser for lead single "One of These Nights" featuring Crush was released on November 25. The album and MV were released the following day.

On February 25, it was revealed that the title of the re-packaged album was I Wanna Be and that it would be released on March 4, 2019, with three new songs, including the title track "I Wanna Be" featuring (G)I-dle's Soyeon.

== Commercial performance ==
Face peaked at number five on Korea's Gaon Album Chart, number 18 on Japan's Oricon Albums Chart, number 195 on the French SNEP download albums chart, and number 9 on the US World Albums chart.

== Critical reception ==
Face on year-end lists
Critic/Publication	List	Rank	Ref.
Idology	The Best Albums of 2018	3	
Refinery29	The 12 Best K-Pop Albums of 2018	2	
Weiv	The Best Albums of 2018	7	

== Track listing ==
Face track listing
No.	Title	Lyrics	Music	Arrangement	Length
1.	"One of Those Nights" (센 척 안 해; featuring Crush)	Kenzie	Noah Conrad, Jake Torrey, Riley Thomas Donnell, Daniel Doran Henig, Adrian McKinnon	Conrad, Torrey	3:10
2.	"Good Good"	Cho Yoon-kyung	Diederik Van Elsas, Justin Jesso, Scotty Grand, Thomas Leithead-Docherty, Ryan S. Jhun	Van Elsas, Leithead-Docherty, Jhun	3:01
3.	"Honest"	Zaya (153/Joombas)	Jon Asher, Dylan Bernard, Michael "R!ot" Wyckoff	Asher, Wyckoff	3:39
4.	"Forever Yours" (featuring Soyou)	Cho	LDN Noise, Daecolm Diego Holland	LDN Noise, Holland	3:27
5.	"Imagine"	McKinnon	McKinnon, 탁 (TAK)	탁 (TAK)	3:22
6.	"Chemicals"	Kang Eun-jung	Imlay, Skrillex, Valentino Khan, Cimo Fränkel, Rik Annema, Jantine Annika Heji	Imlay	3:12
7.	"I Will Fight" (featuring Vinxen)	Key, Vinxen	Bhavik Pattani, Chelcee Grimes	Pattani	3:58
8.	"Easy to Love"	Key, JQ, Moon Hee-yeon	Mike Woods, Kevin White, Andrew Bazzi, MZNC	Rice n' Peas	3:08
9.	"The Duty of Love" (미워)	Key	Chris Meyer, Chris Wahle	Wahle	3:19
10.	"This Life"	Key	Choi Jin-suk, Nermin Harambašić, Anne Judit Stokke Wik, Ronny Vidar Svendsen, Alex Karlsson	Choi	3:40
Total length:					34:28

I Wanna Be track listing
No.	Title	Lyrics	Music	Arrangement	Length
1.	"I Wanna Be" (featuring Soyeon)	Park Seong-hui (Jam Factory), Soyeon ((G)I-dle)	DallasK, Deez, Theron Thomas	DallasK, Deez	3:13
2.	"Show Me"	Danke (lalala studio)	Thomas Troelsen, Bonnie McKee, E. Kidd Bogart	Troelsen	3:06
3.	"One of Those Nights" (센 척 안 해; featuring Crush)	Kenzie	Noah Conrad, Jake Torrey, Riley Thomas Donnell, Daniel Doran Henig, Adrian McKinnon	Conrad, Torrey	3:10
4.	"Good Good"	Cho Yoon-kyung	Diederik Van Elsas, Justin Jesso, Scotty Grand, Thomas Leithead-Docherty, Ryan S. Jhun	Van Elsas, Leithead-Docherty, Jhun	3:01
5.	"Honest"	Zaya (153/Joombas)	Jon Asher, Dylan Bernard, Michael "R!ot" Wyckoff	Asher, Wyckoff	3:39
6.	"Forever Yours" (featuring Soyou)	Cho	LDN Noise, Daecolm Diego Holland	LDN Noise, Holland	3:27
7.	"Imagine"	McKinnon	McKinnon, 탁 (TAK)	탁 (TAK)	3:22
8.	"Chemicals"	Kang Eun-jung	Imlay, Skrillex, Valentino Khan, Cimo Fränkel, Rik Annema, Jantine Annika Heji	Imlay	3:12
9.	"I Will Fight" (featuring Vinxen)	Key, Vinxen	Bhavik Pattani, Chelcee Grimes	Pattani	3:58
10.	"Easy to Love"	Key, JQ, Moon Hee-yeon	Mike Woods, Kevin White, Andrew Bazzi, MZNC	Rice n' Peas	3:08
11.	"The Duty of Love" (미워)	Key	Chris Meyer, Chris Wahle	Wahle	3:19
12.	"This Life"	Key	Choi Jin-suk, Nermin Harambašić, Anne Judit Stokke Wik, Ronny Vidar Svendsen, Alex Karlsson	Choi	3:40
13.	"Cold" (featuring Hanhae; bonus track)	Key, Cody J, Hanhae	Cody J, c-no (Oreo), Woong Kim (Oreo)	c-no (Oreo), Kim (Oreo)	3:52
Total length:					44:07

== Charts ==
Chart performance for Face and I Wanna Be
Chart (2018–2019)	Peak position	
Chart (2018–2019)	Face	I Wanna Be
French Download Albums (SNEP)	195	—
Japan Hot Albums (Billboard Japan)	13	35
Japanese Albums (Oricon)	18	—
South Korean Albums (Gaon)	5	3
US World Albums (Billboard)	9	—
