= Into the New World Tour =

2009–10 concert tour by Girls' Generation

- Asia tour by Girls' Generation
- Promotional poster
- Location: Asia
- Associated album: Various
- Start date: December 19, 2009
- End date: October 17, 2010
- No. of shows: 7

Girls' Generation concert chronology
- Into the New World Tour (2009–2010); The First Japan Arena Tour (2011–2012)

Into the New World Tour is the first Asian concert tour of South Korean girl group Girls' Generation. It commenced with two shows in December 2009 in Seoul, followed by two encore shows in February 2010, before the Asian legs in Shanghai and Taipei. Additionally, on August 25, 2010, the group visited Tokyo, Japan for their Premium Showcase Live in Ariake Colosseum. This was their first ever concert performance in Japan, and it launched their debut in Japan.

== Overview ==
The tour was announced by SM Entertainment in November 2009. The tickets for the tour went on sale on November 19, and they were sold out in 3 minutes.

We are happy and nervous to bring you our first solo concert. We will practice hard to give you a memorable and charismatic performance.

At the Taipei Arena concert in Taiwan on the 16th and 17th, around 24,000 people attended. The tickets to both of Girls' Generation concerts were sold out, establishing a record for having the most people in attendance for a foreign female artist (at that time).

The tour initially consisted of two Korean shows on December 19 and 20, 2009. It was later announced that the group would play two "Encore" shows on February 27 and 28, 2010. The Encore concert on February 27 and 28 was different from their concert in December 2009, in terms of set list. Super Junior member Eunhyuk was set to appear as a guest at the encore concert but had to pull out because he was diagnosed with H1N1 influenza on February 26 thus replaced by Leeteuk and Heechul.

The concert in Bangkok, originally scheduled for July 24, 2010, was postponed indefinitely due to the 2010 Thai political protests. The live album Into the New World was recorded in Seoul released on December 30, 2010, in South Korea.

== Set list ==
South Korea ( December 19/20, 2009)

Main Set:

1. "소원을 말해봐" ("Tell Me Your Wish (Genie)") (Remix)
2. "Show! Show! Show!"
3. "소녀시대" ("Girls' Generation")
4. "Beginning" (Remix)
5. "It's Fantastic"
6. "Etude"
7. "울랄라" ("Ooh La La")
8. "Kissing You" (Remix)
9. "One Year Later" (Jessica and Onew)
10. "Umbrella" (Tiffany's solo)
11. "Hush Hush" (Taeyeon's solo)
12. "좋은 사람 소개시켜줘 ("Introduce Me a Good Person") (Yoona's solo feat. Shindong & Eunhyuk)
13. "Sunny" (Sunny's solo)
14. "Chocolate Love"
15. "Destiny"
16. "Honey"
17. "Merry Go Round"
18. "Dear. Mom"
19. "Day by Day"
20. "동화" ("My Child")
21. "Barbie Girl" (Jessica's solo feat. Key)
22. "Santa Baby" (Sooyoung's solo)
23. "16 Going on 17" (Seohyun's solo)
24. "Singin' in the Rain"
25. "Over the Rainbow"
26. "Chu~♡" f(x)
27. "1, 2 Step" (Yuri's solo feat. Amber)
28. "Tell Me Your Wish" (Poppin Remix) and "Tipsy" (Hyoyeon's dance solo)
29. ""Rhythm Nation" (Dance Battle feat. Yoona, Sooyoung, Yuri & Hyoyeon)
30. "다시만난세계" ("Into the New World")
31. "Be Happy"
32. "힘내" ("Him Nae (Way to Go)")
33. "Gee"
34. "Touch the Sky"

Encore:

35. "앵콜첫곡" ("Naengmyun")
36. "하하하송" ("HaHaHa")
37. "Complete"
38. "더블앵콜" ("Baby Baby")
39. "Oh!"
Shanghai Concert (April 17, 2010)

Main Set:
[Clip: Opening]

1. "Tell Me Your Wish (Genie) (Remix ver.)"
2. "Show! Show! Show!"
3. "Girls' Generation"

[Transition clip: Wanted]

1. "Beginning"

[Self introduction : Jessica, Yoona, Sunny, Sooyoung, Hyoyeon, Yuri, Seohyun, Tiffany, Taeyeon]

1. "It's Fantastic!"
2. "Etude (Remix ver.)"
3. "Ooh la la"
4. "Kissing You (Remix ver.)"

[Clip: SNSD's daily life]

1. "One Year Later" (Jessica and Onew)
2. "Umbrella" (Tiffany's solo)
3. "Hush Hush" (Taeyeon's solo)
4. "Introduce A Good Person" (Yoona's solo feat. SHINee's Key and Taemin)
5. "Sunny" (Sunny's solo)

[Clip: Tough Angels]

1. "Chocolate Love (Retro-pop version)"

[Clip: Girls' Diary]

1. "Honey"
2. "Dear Mom"
3. "Forever"

[Clip: Good Morning]

1. "Day By Day"
2. "My Child"

[Clip: Cinderella Story]

1. "Barbie Girl" (Jessica's solo feat SHINee's Key)
2. "16 Going On 17" (Seohyun's solo)
3. "Singin' In The Rain"
4. "Somewhere Over The Rainbow" (Taeyeon, Jessica, Sunny, and Seohyun)

[SHINee - "Ring Ding Dong"]

1. "If U Seek Amy" (Sooyoung's solo)
2. "Genie (Dance ver.)" + "So Sick" (Hyoyeon's dance solo)
3. "1, 2 Step" (Yuri's solo feat. SHINee's Minho)
4. "Rhythm Nation" (Hyoyeon, Yoona, Yuri, and Sooyoung showdown)

[Clip: Beautiful Girl]

1. "Into The New World (Remix ver.)"
2. "Be Happy"
3. "Way To Go"
4. "Gee"
5. "Touch The Sky"

[Clip: Goodbye/Encore#1]

1. "Naengmyun"
2. "Hahaha"

[Talk]

1. "Complete"

[Encore #2]

1. "Baby Baby"
2. "Oh!"
Japan Concert (August 25, 2010)

Main Set:
[Clip: Opening]

1. "소원을 말해봐" ("Tell Me Your Wish (Genie)")
2. "Oh!"

[Self introduction : Jessica, Yoona, Sunny, Sooyoung, Hyoyeon, Yuri, Seohyun, Tiffany, Taeyeon]

1. "Run Devil Run"
2. "Into The New World"

[Talk] [Closing]

1. "Gee"
Taiwan Concert ( October 16/17, 2010)

Main Set:
[Clip: Opening]

1. "Tell Me Your Wish (Genie) (Rock Tronic Remix ver.)"
2. "Show! Show! Show!"
3. "Girls' Generation"

[Transition clip: Wanted]

1. "Beginning"

[Self introduction : Jessica, Yoona, Sunny, Sooyoung, Hyoyeon, Yuri, Seohyun, Tiffany, Taeyeon]

1. "It's Fantastic!"
2. "Etude (Remix ver.)"
3. "Ooh la la"
4. "Kissing You (Remix ver.)"

[Clip: SNSD's daily life]

1. "Umbrella" (Tiffany's solo)
2. "Hush Hush" (Taeyeon's solo)
3. "Introduce A Good Person" (Yoona's solo feat. Super Junior's Leeteuk and Donghae)
4. "Sunny" (Sunny's solo)

[Clip: Tough Angels]

1. "Chocolate Love (Retro-pop version)"

[Clip: Girls' Diary]

1. "Honey"
2. "Dear Mom"
3. "Forever"

[Clip: Good Morning]

1. "Day By Day"
2. "My Child"

[Clip: Cinderella Story]

1. "Barbie Girl" (Jessica's solo feat Super Junior's Donghae)
2. "16 Going On 17" (Seohyun's solo)
3. "Singin' In The Rain"
4. "Somewhere Over The Rainbow" (Taeyeon, Jessica, Sunny, and Seohyun)
5. "If U Seek Amy" (Sooyoung's solo)
6. "카라멜 커피 (Talk to Me)"(Jessica and Tiffany's duet)
7. "1, 2 Step" (Yuri's solo feat. Tiffany)
8. "Rhythm Nation" (Hyoyeon, Yoona, Yuri, and Sooyoung showdown)

[Clip: Beautiful Girl]

1. "Into The New World (Remix ver.)"
2. "Be Happy"
3. "Way To Go"
4. "Gee"
5. "Touch The Sky"

[Clip: Goodbye/Encore#1]

1. "Naengmyun"
2. "Hahaha"

[Talk]

1. "Complete"

[Encore #2]

1. "Baby Baby"
2. "Oh!"
[Ending]

== Tour dates ==
Date	City	Country	Venue	Attendance
December 19, 2009	Seoul	South Korea	Olympic Fencing Gymnasium	13,000
December 20, 2009	Seoul	South Korea	Olympic Fencing Gymnasium	13,000
February 27, 2010	Seoul	South Korea	Olympic Fencing Gymnasium	13,000
February 28, 2010	Seoul	South Korea	Olympic Fencing Gymnasium	13,000
April 17, 2010	Shanghai	China	Shanghai Indoor Stadium	—
October 16, 2010	Taipei	Taiwan	Taipei Arena	24,000
October 17, 2010	Taipei	Taiwan	Taipei Arena	24,000
Total				50,000

== DVD ==
Girls' Generation 1st Asia Tour: Into the New World

Video by Girls' Generation
- Released: August 18, 2011
- Recorded: 2009
- Genre: K-pop
- Label: SM Entertainment

Girls' Generation chronology
All About Girls' Generation: Paradise in Phuket (2011)	Girls' Generation 1st Asia Tour: Into the New World (2011)	The 1st Japan Tour DVD (2012)

Girls' Generation 1st Asia Tour: Into the New World is the fourth DVD release from South Korean girl group Girls' Generation. It was released on August 18, 2011, in South Korea.

=== History ===
Girls' Generation kicked off their first Asia tour Into the New World in Seoul on December 19–20, 2009. The two-disc concert release is a live recording of their February 2010 encore concert at Seoul's Olympic Park Fencing Stadium. Other than performing hits like Gee, Genie, Chocolate Love, and Baby Baby, the DVD contains special performances and solo stages, including Sooyoung Santa Baby, Taeyeon Hush Hush, Sunny's Sunny, Yuri's 1, 2 Step, Yoona "Introduce Me a Good Man", Jessica and Tiffany's duet Caramel Coffee, Seo Hyun's Sixteen Going on Seventeen, and Hyoyeon's dance special.

The DVD set includes making-of features (rehearsal, backstage, interview) and a concert photobook.

=== Track list ===
Disc 1
No.	Title	Length
1.	"Nine Angels"
2.	"소원을 말해봐 (Genie) - Rock Tronic Remix Ver."
3.	"Show! Show! Show!"
4.	"소녀시대 (Girls' Generation)"
5.	"Beginning"
6.	"멤버소개 (Members Introduction)"
7.	"It'S Fantastic"
8.	"Etude"
9.	"Ooh La-La!"
10.	"Kissing You"
11.	"1년 後 [One Year Later]_제시카, 온유"
12.	"좋은 사람 있으면 소개시켜줘 (A Perfect Match) [윤아] feat.이특, 신동"
13.	"Sunny [써니]"
14.	"Umbrella [티파니]"
15.	"Hush Hush; Hush Hush[태연]"
16.	"Chocolate Love"
17.	"Honey (소원)"
18.	"Dear. Mom"
19.	"영원히 너와 꿈꾸고 싶다 (Forever)"
20.	"사랑은 선율을 타고 (Day By Day)"
21.	"동화 (My Child)"

Disc 2
No.	Title	Length
22.	"Barbie Girl [제시카] feat. Key (SHINee)"
23.	"Santa Baby [수영]"
24.	"라벨: 모음곡 「거울」제 4 곡 「어릿광대의 아침노래」[서현] (Ravel, Miroirs mvmt. 4 "Alborada del gracioso")"
25.	"Sixteen Going On Seventeen [서현]"
26.	"Singin' In The Rain"
27.	"Over The Rainbow"
28.	"Hyoyeon Dance"
29.	"1, 2 Step [유리] feat. Amber (f(x))"
30.	"BEAUTIFUL GIRLS FEAT.유영진"
31.	"다시 만난 세계 (Into the new world)"
32.	"웃자 (Be Happy)"
33.	"힘 내! (Way To Go)"
34.	"Gee"
35.	"Touch The Sky"
36.	"냉면 (Cold Noodles)(차가운 니 얼굴) FEAT.소녀시대"
37.	"하하하송 (HaHaHaSong)"
38.	"멘트 (Moment)"
39.	"Complete"
40.	"Baby Baby"
41.	"Oh!"
42.	"Closing Ment"

Bonus Track
No.	Title	Length
43.	"카라멜 커피 (Talk To Me)_제시카, 티파니"
44.	"Barbie Girl [제시카] feat. Kim Hee-chul (Super Junior)"

=== Release history ===
Country	Date	Distributing label	Format
South Korea	August 18, 2011	SM Entertainment	DVD
Hong Kong	October 17, 2011	Universal Music	DVD
Taiwan	October 25, 2011	Universal Music	DVD
