= The First Japan Arena Tour (Girls' Generation) =

2011 concert tour by Girls' Generation

- Japan tour by Girls' Generation
- Location: Japan
- Associated album: Girls' Generation
- Start date: May 31, 2011
- End date: July 18, 2011
- No. of shows: 14

Girls' Generation concert chronology
- Into the New World Asia Tour (2009–10); The First Japan Arena Tour (2011); Girls' Generation Tour (2011–12)

The First Japan Arena Tour is the first Japanese concert tour by South Korean girl group Girls' Generation to promote their 2011 self-titled album in Japanese.

== Background ==
It was announced on March 7, 2011, that Girls' Generation would embark on their first nationwide Japan tour on May 18, 2011, at Yoyogi National Stadium in Tokyo, with a total of seven stops in Tokyo, Nagoya, Osaka and Fukuoka. The start of the tour was postponed to May 31, 2011, because of the 2011 Tōhoku earthquake and tsunami. Due to overwhelming demand with up to 300,000 applicants applying for tickets, additional stops were added to the tour.

The tour covered Osaka, Saitama, Tokyo, Hiroshima, Nagoya, and Fukuoka with total of fourteen performances. The tour attracted about 140,000 fans.

== Commercial performance ==
Tickets for the First Japan Arena Tour were priced at ¥9,300 (₩124,500). Star News estimated the total gross revenue from the tour at ₩18.7 billion (US$17.5 million), with merchandise sales bringing the total revenue to over ₩20 billion ($18.8 million).

== Media coverage ==
Various Japanese media, including Mezamashi TV, covered the start of their concert with detailed reports. NHK's Music Japan presented a Girls' Generation special, detailing their meteoric rise in Korea and subsequent debut in Japan, with an interview session interspersed with footage from the Osaka stop of the First Japan Arena Tour. Girls' Generation First Japan Arena Tour in 3D was broadcast on Japan's SkyPerfectTv on August 21.

== Set list ==
Main set

1. "Genie (Japanese ver.)"
2. "You-aholic"
3. "Mr. Taxi"
4. "I'm In Love With The Hero"
5. "Let It Rain"
6. "Snowy Wish"
7. "Etude"
8. "Kissing You"
9. "Oh! (House ver.)"
10. "Almost" (Jessica's solo)
11. "Lady Marmalade" (Taeyeon & Tiffany's duet)
12. "3" (Sunny's solo)
13. "Don't Stop the Music" (Hyoyeon's solo)
14. "The Great Escape"
15. "Bad Girl"
16. "Devil's Cry" (Taeyeon's solo)
17. "Run Devil Run (Japanese ver.)"
18. "Beautiful Stranger"
19. "Hoot (Japanese ver.)"
20. "If" (Yuri's solo)
21. "4 Minutes (Yoona's solo)
22. "Stuff Like That There" (Seohyun's solo)
23. "Sway" (Sooyoung's solo)
24. "Danny Boy
25. "Complete"
26. "My Child"
27. "Cold Noodles"
28. "HaHaHa"
29. "Gee (Japanese ver.)"
30. "Born To Be A Lady"

Encore

1. "Into the New World"
2. "Way To Go"
3. "It's Fantastic" (Japanese ver.)
Notes
- During the second show in Saitama, Sunny left the stage during "Etude" due to overwork, but returned for "It's Fantastic" after receiving treatment shortly from the hospital.

== Tour dates ==
List of concert dates
Date	City	Venue	Attendance	Revenue
May 31, 2011	Osaka	Osaka-jō Hall	140,000	$17,578,000
June 1, 2011	Osaka	Osaka-jō Hall	140,000	$17,578,000
June 4, 2011	Saitama	Saitama Super Arena	140,000	$17,578,000
June 5, 2011	Saitama	Saitama Super Arena	140,000	$17,578,000
June 17, 2011	Tokyo	Yoyogi National Gymnasium	140,000	$17,578,000
June 18, 2011	Tokyo	Yoyogi National Gymnasium	140,000	$17,578,000
June 28, 2011	Tokyo	Yoyogi National Gymnasium	140,000	$17,578,000
June 29, 2011	Tokyo	Yoyogi National Gymnasium	140,000	$17,578,000
July 2, 2011	Hiroshima	Hiroshima Green Arena	140,000	$17,578,000
July 3, 2011	Hiroshima	Hiroshima Green Arena	140,000	$17,578,000
July 6, 2011	Nagoya	Nippon Gaishi Hall	140,000	$17,578,000
July 7, 2011	Nagoya	Nippon Gaishi Hall	140,000	$17,578,000
July 17, 2011	Fukuoka	Marine Messe Fukuoka	140,000	$17,578,000
July 18, 2011	Fukuoka	Marine Messe Fukuoka	140,000	$17,578,000
Total			140,000	$17,578,000

== DVD ==
Girls' Generation First Japan Tour

Video by Girls' Generation
- Released: December 14, 2011
- Recorded: 2011
- Genre: K-pop, J-pop
- Length: approx. 120 minutes
- Label: Nayutawave Records

Girls' Generation chronology
Girls' Generation - The 1st Asia Tour: Into the New World (2011)	Girls' Generation First Japan Tour (2011)	Girls' Generation Complete Video Collection (2012)

Girls' Generation First Japan Tour is the fifth DVD and Blu-ray release from South Korean girl group Girls' Generation. Following their announcement that Girls' Generation will be releasing their First Japanese photobook titled 'Holiday' on November 30, 2011, they also released a Blu-ray/DVD for their First Japanese Concert Tour on December 14.

=== History ===
The DVD contains performances and footage from their first Japan tour, which began on May 31, 2011, and took the girls through six cities in Japan for 14 performances. The Blu-ray/DVD included two editions, the 'limited edition' which will come with the special footage, photobook and a pin badge set. The Blu-ray and DVD copies included special footage but the 36-paged photobook will differ. The limited edition included a special caramel box, digipak for the disk case, and a special cosmetic case holding the ten pin badges (Blu-ray: Gold color / DVD: Silver color).

=== Track list ===
1. Genie
2. You-aholic
3. Mr. Taxi
4. I'm in Love With the Hero
5. Let It Rain
6. Snowy Wish
7. Etude
8. Kissing you
9. Oh!
10. The Great Escape
11. Bad Girl
12. Run Devil Run intro
13. Run Devil Run
14. Beautiful Stranger
15. Hoot
16. Complete
17. My Child
18. Ice Boy
19. HaHaHaSong
20. Gee
21. Born to Be Lady
22. Into the New world
23. Way to Go
24. It's Fantastic! (Japanese ver.)

First Press Limited Edition

1. Bonus video recording

=== Chart performance ===
Girls’ Generation's ‘Japan First Arena Tour Girls’ Generation’ which was released on December 14 took the no.1 spot on December 14's Oricon Daily DVD Combined Chart, Blu-ray Chart and DVD Music Chart. According to the Oricon Charts, the DVD version of the “Japan First Tour” has placed first for the week of December 12 through the 18th in both the “Music DVD” category and in total DVDs sold. Since its release on December 14, the DVD of Girls’ Generation's successful concert tour in Japan has sold 69,000 copies. The Blu-ray version of the “Japan First Tour” placed first for the “Music Blu-ray” category and second in total Blu-ray sales for the week. The Blu-ray, released at the same as the DVD, has to date sold 37,000 copies. Girls’ Generation is the only foreign artist to place first on the Oricon Weekly Charts for both the “Music DVD” and “Blu-ray DVD” categories at the same time.

=== Charts ===
Chart	Peak position
Japanese DVD Chart (Oricon)	1
Japanese Blu-ray Chart (Oricon)	1

=== Certifications ===
Region	Certification	Certified units/sales
Japan (RIAJ)	Gold	100,000^{^}
^{^} Shipments figures based on certification alone.

=== Release history ===
Country	Date	Format	Label
Japan	December 14, 2011	DVD, Blu-ray Disc	Nayutawave Records
Taiwan	April 27, 2012	DVD	Universal Music
Hong Kong	April 27, 2012	DVD	Universal Music
Thailand	June 30, 2012	DVD	Universal Music
Philippines	August 29, 2012	DVD	MCA Music
Indonesia	November 16, 2012	DVD	Universal Music
