= Girls' Generation Tour =

2011–12 concert tour by Girls' Generation

2011 Girls' Generation Tour
- Asia tour by Girls' Generation
- Promotional Poster for Singapore Show
- Location: Asia
- Associated album: Various
- Start date: July 23, 2011
- End date: February 12, 2012
- No. of shows: 9

Girls' Generation concert chronology
- The First Japan Arena Tour (2011); Girls' Generation Tour' (2011–12); Girls & Peace: 2nd Japan Tour (2013)

Girls' Generation Tour is the second concert tour by South Korean girl group Girls' Generation. (Note: Starting 2012, the tour was renamed to "2012 Girls' Generation Tour" for the Hong Kong stop and later simply as "Girls' Generation Tour" for the final stops, without referencing the year.) The concert tour kicked off in Seoul and continued in Taipei and Singapore. Girls' Generation performed their first ever concert in Hong Kong on January 15, 2012.

== Background ==
The tour was announced by SM Entertainment in June 2011, following the success of the group’s First Japan Arena Tour. During the press conference, the concert was described as an opportunity to present a more mature image of the group through a variety of performances throughout the show. The tour was also positioned as part of the group’s global expansion, as audiences of various nationalities attended the concerts, and information displayed during the tour was presented in multiple languages. To accommodate international fans, the Korea Tourism Organization reportedly to have assisted with ticketing and travel for the group performance in Seoul.

The tour commenced in Seoul immediately after the conclusion of their Japan Arena Tour. As a result, it featured staging, costumes, and a setlist similar to those used in Japan. Songs that had Korean-language versions were performed in Korean rather than Japanese.

During the final concert date in Seoul, it was announced that the next stop of the tour would be Taipei on September 9–11, 2011. On October 11, 2011 it was announced that the tour will visit Singapore on December 9, 2011 and later additional date were added. This was the first Korean girl group to hold a solo concert in Singapore. Starting 2012, the group visited Hong Kong on January 15, 2012, which their first time performing solo there. The last stop of the tour was in Bangkok, Thailand on February 12, 2012.

== Concert synopsis ==
To showcase a variety of performances with different concepts, the concert featured large LED screens, laser effects, and new elements such as trapeze performances. Additionally, two custom-built stages were connected by three walkways. For the Singapore stop, it was reported that the stage construction cost the promoter at least S$1.8 million, making it the most expensive K-pop solo concert production in the country at the time.

The concert lasted for three hours and was divided into six acts. It opened with "Genie," as the group appeared from a diamond-shaped box at the center of the stage that suddenly opened, and they began performing the song wearing white lacy jackets, shorts and knee high boots. This was followed by "I'm in Love with the Hero," during which the members performed suspended from wires, giving the impression of flying. After the opening act, the group continued with duet and solo performances. The concert then transitioned into rock-style performances in a black costume decorated with feathers for "The Great Escape," "Run Devil Run," and "Hoot," showcasing the group’s maturity. Following this, the group performed ballads such as "Danny Boy," "Complete," and "My Child" in a fairy-tale-like setting wearing small crowns, with a boat circling the stage. The concert ended with an encore act, started with the group debut song "Into the New World" and followed by another two to three songs depending on the stop.

== Commercial performance ==
The tour was generally successful. Held under the umbrella of the "Girls' Generation Tour," including their stops in Japan, the tour attracted a total of 230,000 spectators.

Due to high demand, additional stops were added to the tour. The Taiwan stop was originally scheduled for one day but was later extended to a three-day run. This marked the first time a foreign girl group had held a three-day concert at the Taipei Arena, and the shows set a record for ticket sales at the venue at that time. This also happened in Singapore, after the first initial announcement in October 11, 2011, the organizer on October 30, 2011 announced that another date was added after the first night and ticket for second night was sold out in four minutes. The group also broke the record for the fastest concert to sell out in Thailand. The highest priced tickets sold out in ten minutes. All 11,000 concert tickets were sold in twenty minutes, setting the record for the concert to be sold out the fastest in Thailand.

== Set list ==
This set list was taken from the show in Seoul. It does not represent all shows throughout the tour.

Act I – Opening - The Girl's Carnival

1. "Genie" (소원을 말해봐) (lit. 'Tell me your wish'))
2. "You-aholic"
3. "Mr. Taxi"
4. "I'm in Love with the Hero"
5. "Let It Rain"
6. "Snowy Wish" (첫눈에...) (lit. 'First snow...'))
7. "Sweet Talking Baby" (뻔 & Fun...)
8. "Kissing You"
9. "Oh!"

Act II – Solo

10. "Don't Stop the Music" (Hyoyeon)
11. "Almost" (Jessica)
12. "3" (Sunny)
13. "Lady Marmalade" (Taeyeon & Tiffany's duet)

Act III

14. "The Great Escape"
15. "Bad Girl"
16. "Devil's Cry" (Taeyeon)
17. "Run Devil Run"
18. "Beautiful Stranger"
19. "Hoot" (훗)

Act IV – Solo

20. "If" (Yuri)
21. "Sway" (Sooyoung)
22. "Stuff Like That There" (Seohyun)
23. "4 Minutes (Yoona)

Act V

24. "Danny Boy"
25. "Complete
26. "My Child" (동화) (lit. 'Fairytale'))

Act VI

27. "Ice Boy" (냉면) (lit. 'Cold noodles')))
28. "Hahaha Song" (하하하송)
29. "Gee"
30. "Forever" (영원히 너와 꿈꾸고 싶다) (lit. 'I want to dream with you forever'))

Encore

31. "Into the New World" (다시 만난 세계) (lit. 'The world we met again'))
32. "Way To Go" (힘내!) (lit. 'Cheer up!'))
33. "Baby Baby"
34. "It's Fantastic"

=== Alterations ===
- During the Taipei stop, Sooyoung was involved in a car accident on the morning of August 28. Consequently, she was unable to participate in the concert; her solo was therefore not performed.
- “Hoot” was performed in a rock-style arrangement, while “Mr. Taxi” and “Let It Rain” were performed in Korean.
- At the Singapore, Hong Kong, and Bangkok shows, “Sweet Talking Baby” and “Baby Baby” were not performed and “The Boys” was added to the setlist and performed in English following “Beautiful Stranger.”

== Tour dates ==
List of concert dates
Date	City	Country	Venue	Attendance	Revenue
July 23, 2011	Seoul	South Korea	Olympic Gymnastics Arena	20,000	$1,600,000
July 24, 2011	Seoul	South Korea	Olympic Gymnastics Arena	20,000	$1,600,000
September 9, 2011	Taipei	Taiwan	Taipei Arena	31,000	$3,160,000
September 10, 2011	Taipei	Taiwan	Taipei Arena	31,000	$3,160,000
September 11, 2011	Taipei	Taiwan	Taipei Arena	31,000	$3,160,000
December 9, 2011	Singapore		Singapore Indoor Stadium	14,000	—
December 10, 2011	Singapore		Singapore Indoor Stadium	14,000	—
January 15, 2012	Hong Kong	China	AsiaWorld–Arena	10,000	—
February 12, 2012	Bangkok	Thailand	Impact Arena	11,000	—
Total				86,000	N/A

== Recording ==
S.M. Entertainment released a concert film on DVD on November 30, 2012. The release includes two DVDs, a poster, and a photobook. Behind-the-scenes footage from the performance, along with member interviews is also included.

=== 2011 Girls' Generation Tour (DVD) ===
Girls' Generation Tour

Video by Girls' Generation
- Released: November 30, 2012
- Recorded: 2011
- Genres: K-pop; J-pop
- Length: 3:28:00
- Languages: Korean, English
- Label: S.M. Entertainment

Girls' Generation chronology
Girls' Generation Complete Video Collection (2012)	Girls' Generation Tour (2012)	Girls & Peace: 2nd Japan Tour (2013)

This recording features performances from the final day of the Seoul concert, while the behind-the-scenes footage covers both days. The DVD also includes rehearsal footage prior to the concert and . This release does not include Yoona’s and Seohyun’s solo performances.

==== Track list ====
Track lists are adapted from the DVD's liner notes.

Disc 1 2011 Girls' Generation Tour
No.	Title	Length
1.	"Intro" (Opening)
2.	"Genie" (소원을 말해봐)
3.	"You-aholic"
4.	"Mr.Taxi" (Korean version)
5.	"I'm in Love with the Hero"
6.	"Let It Rain" (Korean version)
7.	"Members Introduction" (멤버소개)
8.	"Snowy Wish" (첫눈에...)
9.	"Sweet Talking Baby" (뻔&Fun)
10.	"Kissing You"
11.	"Oh!"
12.	"Don't Stop the Music" (Hyoyeon's solo)
13.	"Almost" (Jessica's solo)
14.	"Three" (Sunny's solo)
15.	"Lady Marmalade" (Taeyeon & Tiffany's duet)
16.	"The Great Escape"
17.	"Bad Girl"
18.	"Devil's Cry" (Run Devil Run Intro)
19.	"Run Devil Run"
20.	"Beautiful Stranger"
21.	"Hoot"
22.	"If" (Yuri's solo)
23.	"Sway" (Sooyoung's solo)
Total length:		01:43:43

Disc 2 2011 Girls' Generation Tour
No.	Title	Length
24.	"Danny Boy"
25.	"Complete"
26.	"My Child" (동화)
27.	"Ice Boy" (냉면 - 차가운 니 얼굴)
28.	"Hahaha Song" (하하하송)
29.	"Gee"
30.	"Ment" (멘트)
31.	"Forever" (영원히 너와 꿈꾸고 싶다)
32.	"Into the New World" (다시 만난 세계)
33.	"Way To Go!" (힘 내!)
34.	"Ment" (멘트)
35.	"It's Fantastic" (멘트)
36.	"Closing" (클로징 멘트)
37.	"Concert Making Film"
Total length:		01:16:11

=== 2011 Girls' Generation Tour - Live ===
2011 Girls' Generation Tour – Live

Live album by Girls' Generation
- Released: April 11, 2013
- Venue: KSPO Dome
- Genre: K-pop
- Length: 2:08:00
- Labels: SM; KT Music; Dreamus
- Producer: Lee Soo-man

Girls' Generation chronology
I Got a Boy (2013)	2011 Girls' Generation Tour – Live (2013)	Love & Peace (2013)

A live album titled 2011 Girls’ Generation Tour – Live was also released on April 11, 2013. The album covers most of the performances and includes a studio version of “Danny Boy” and a Korean version of “Let It Rain.” Like the concert film, the live album was recorded on the final day of the Seoul concert and does not include Yoona’s and Seohyun’s solo performances.

==== Track list ====
Track lists are adapted from the CD's liner notes.

Disc 1 2011 Girls' Generation Tour - Live
No.	Title	Length
1.	"Girl's Carnival" (Opening)	6:15
2.	"Genie" (소원을 말해봐)	4:34
3.	"You-aholic"	3:33
4.	"Mr.Taxi" (Korean version)	3:33
5.	"I'm in Love with the Hero"	2:53
6.	"Let It Rain" (Korean version)	3:42
7.	"Snowy Wish" (첫눈에...)	3:21
8.	"Sweet Talking Baby" (뻔&Fun)	3:27
9.	"Kissing You"	3:19
10.	"Oh!"	3:44
11.	"Don't Stop the Music" (Hyoyeon's solo)	3:34
12.	"Almost" (Jessica's solo)	2:46
13.	"Three" (Sunny's solo)	3:26
14.	"Lady Marmalade" (Taeyeon & Tiffany's duet)	4:23
15.	"The Great Escape"	3:51
16.	"Bad Girl"	4:52

Disc 2 2011 Girls' Generation Tour - Live
No.	Title	Length
1.	"Devil's Cry"	2:09
2.	"Run Devil Run"	4:04
3.	"Beautiful Stranger"	3:32
4.	"Hoot"	4:09
5.	"If" (Yuri's solo)	3:34
6.	"Sway" (Sooyoung's solo)	3:12
7.	"Danny Boy"	3:51
8.	"Complete"	3:58
9.	"My Child" (동화)	4:41
10.	"Ice Boy" (냉면 - 차가운 니 얼굴)	3:38
11.	"Hahaha Song" (하하하송)	3:17
12.	"Gee"	3:22
13.	"Forever" (영원히 너와 꿈꾸고 싶다)	4:24
14.	"Into the New World" (다시 만난 세계)	4:26
15.	"Way To Go!" (힘 내!)	3:06
16.	"It's Fantastic" (멘트)	3:38
17.	"Let It Rain" (Korean version - Studio)	3:39
18.	"Danny Boy" (Studio version)	3:49

=== Notes ===
- "Mr.Taxi" is stylized as "MR.TAXI".
- "I'm in Love with the Hero" is stylized as "I'm In Love With The HERO".

=== Charts ===
==== Monthly charts ====
Monthly chart performance for "2011 Girls' Generation Tour - Live"
Chart (2013)	Position
South Korea (Circle)	3

==== Year-end charts ====
Year-end chart performance for "2011 Girls' Generation Tour - Live"
Chart (2013)	Position
South Korea (Circle)	76

==== Release history ====
List of release dates showing region, date, formats, and label
Region	Date	Format(s)	Label	Ref.
South Korea	November 30, 2012	DVD	S.M. Entertainment	
Singapore	January 4, 2013	DVD	Universal Music	
Taiwan	January 18, 2013	DVD	Universal Music	
Various	April 11, 2013	Streaming	S.M. Entertainment	
South Korea	April 11, 2013	CD	S.M. Entertainment, KMP Holdings	
Thailand	June 17, 2013	CD	SM True	
