= Sowoneul Malhaebwa =

Sowoneul Malhaebwa may refer to:

- Tell Me Your Wish (Genie), a 2009 extended play by Girls' Generation
  - "Tell Me Your Wish (Genie)", the title track
- Make Your Wish, a 2014 South Korean drama series
