= Girls' Generation (2007 album) =

Studio album by Girls' Generation
- Released: November 1, 2007
- Recorded: 2006–2007
- Genre: Bubblegum pop
- Length: 39:34
- Language: Korean
- Labels: SM; Dreamus

Girls' Generation chronology
Girls' Generation (2007)	Gee (2009)

Singles from Girls' Generation
- 1. "Into the New World" Released: August 2, 2007; 2. "Girls' Generation" Released: November 1, 2007; 3. "Kissing You" Released: January 14, 2008

Baby Baby reissue cover
- Digital and A version cover

Singles from Baby Baby
- 1. "Baby Baby" Released: March 17, 2008

Girls' Generation (소녀시대; Sonyeo Sidae) is the debut studio album by South Korean girl group Girls' Generation, released by SM Entertainment on November 1, 2007. Recorded in Korean with minor phrases in English, Girls' Generation is a pop album with bubblegum influences. It spawned three singles: "Into the New World" in August 2007 as their debut single, the title track released simultaneously with the album, and "Kissing You" in January 2008.

Following the album's release, Girls' Generation was ranked as the second best-selling album of November 2007, selling just over 49,400 copies. It was the 12th best-selling album of the year overall in South Korea, with sales of 56,800 copies; The CD single of "Into the New World" additionally sold over 22,800 copies within the year. A reissue titled Baby Baby, with its single of the same name, was subsequently released on March 13, 2008.

== Singles ==
"Into the New World" was initially released as Girls' Generation's debut single album, on August 2, 2007. The group started promoting the song on the SBS's Inkigayo on August 5, and subsequently had it reached number one on Mnet's M Countdown on October 11. It was later included on this album. The lead single, "Girls' Generation", written and produced by Lee Seung-chul and Song Jae-jun, was released on November 1, 2007. The song was originally sung by Lee Seung-chul in the 1980s. The original singer later appeared on M Countdown with the group to perform the song together.

In early 2008, Girls' Generation began promoting the single, "Kissing You". The song won the group their first K-chart win, after achieving the number one position on KBS's Music Bank February chart. It also achieved the number one spot on three major music program chart rankings—Inkigayo, M Countdown and Music Bank. "Baby Baby" was released on March 17, 2008, and was the lead single of the repackaged album of the same name. The music video for the song contained scenes of the making of video of the "Girls' Generation" music video, and footage of the members working on the debut album.

== Reception ==
Within its first month of release, the album sold 49,438 copies and was the 2nd best-selling album of November 2007 in South Korea, only behind Super Junior's Don't Don. The album sold a total of 56,804 copies in 2007, becoming the 12th best-selling album of the year in the country. It received a nomination for Album Bonsang (Main Prize) at the 22nd Golden Disc Awards.

The album surpassed 100,000 sales mark in March 2008; in doing so, Girls' Generation became the first girl group to achieve the feat after S.E.S. in six years. As of September 2008, the album's total sales figures combined with those of the reissue, Baby Baby, have exceeded sales of over 126,269 units.

== Live performances ==
The tour Into the New World Tour was used to promote the album, along with music shows promotion before the tour, which started on December 19, 2009, in Olympic Fencing Gymnasium, Seoul, South Korea, ended in Taipei Arena, Taipei, Taiwan on October 17, 2010.

== Track listing ==
Credits adapted from Naver.

Girls' Generation track listing
No.	Title	Lyrics	Music	Arrangement	Length
1.	"Girls' Generation" (소녀시대; Sonyeosidae)	Lee Seung-chul	Song Jae-joon	Kenzie	3:50
2.	"Ooh La-La!"	Yoon Hyo-sang	Steve Hyunkyu Lee	Ahn Ik-Soo	3:54
3.	"Baby Baby"	Hwang Seong-je	Hwang Seong-je	Hwang Seong-je	3:11
4.	"Complete"	Jo Yoon-kyung	Ingrid Skretting; Jan Lysdahl	Hong-seok	3:56
5.	"Kissing You"	LeeOn; Kwon Yoon-jung	LeeOn	LeeOn	3:18
6.	"Merry-Go-Round"	Kim Jeong-bae	Kenzie	Kenzie	3:14
7.	"Tears" (그대를 부르면; Geudaereul Bureumyeon; lit. 'When I Call You')	Kim Seok-hyun	Park Ki-wan	Park Ki-wan	3:52
8.	"Tinkerbell"	Jo Yoon-kyung	Ingrid Skretting	Kenzie	2:56
9.	"7989" (Kangta & Taeyeon)	Kangta	Kangta	Kangta	3:31
10.	"Honey" (소원; Sowon; lit. 'Wish') (Perfect for You)	Kwon Yoon-jung	Ingrid Skretting	Kenzie	3:15
11.	"Into the New World" (다시 만난 세계; Dasi Mannan Segye)	Kim Jeong-bae	Kenzie	Kenzie	4:25
Total length:					39:22

Baby Baby – Repackage (bonus tracks)
No.	Title	Lyrics	Music	Arrangement	Length
12.	"Kissing You" (Skool Rock Remix)	Kwon Yoon-jung; LeeOn	LeeOn	LeeOn	3:05
13.	"Let's Go Girls' Generation!! (Long version)" (Let's Go 소녀시대!! (길게 듣기))				9:47
14.	"Let's Go Girls' Generation!! (Short version)" (Let's Go 소녀시대!! (짧게 듣기))				6:18

== Personnel ==
Credits for Girls Generation are adapted from AllMusic.

- Girls' Generation – primary artist
- K Strings – performer, strings
- Sam Lee – guitars

== Charts ==
=== Weekly charts ===
Chart (2010)	Peak position
South Korean Albums (Gaon)	16
South Korean Albums (Gaon) Baby Baby reissue	11

=== Monthly charts ===
Chart (2007–2008) (Note: Prior to the Gaon Music Chart, which launched in 2010, the Music Industry Association of Korea (MIAK) compiled sales figures for music releases until 2008.)	Peak position
South Korean Albums (MIAK)	2
South Korean Albums (MIAK) Baby Baby reissue	1

=== Year-end charts ===
Chart (2007)	Position
South Korean Albums (MIAK)	12

Chart (2010)	Position
South Korean Albums (Gaon)	61
South Korean Albums (Gaon) Baby Baby reissue	54

== Release history ==
Region	Date	Version	Format	Label
South Korea	November 1, 2007	Girls' Generation	CD; cassette	SM Entertainment
Taiwan	November 30, 2007	Girls' Generation	CD	Avex Asia
South Korea	March 13, 2008	Baby Baby reissue	CD; DVD	SM Entertainment
Taiwan	May 2, 2008	Baby Baby reissue	CD; DVD	Avex Asia
