= Oh! (Girls' Generation album) =

Album by Girls' Generation

Studio album by Girls' Generation
- Released: January 28, 2010
- Genre: K-pop
- Length: 43:40
- Language: Korean
- Labels: SM; Dreamus

Girls' Generation chronology
Genie (2009)	Oh! (2010)	Hoot (2010)

Singles from Oh!
- 1. "Oh!" Released: January 25, 2010

Run Devil Run reissue cover

Singles from Run Devil Run
- 1. "Run Devil Run" Released: March 17, 2010

Oh! is the second studio album by South Korean girl group Girls' Generation, released by SM Entertainment on January 28, 2010. It features the single "Oh!". A repackaged version, Run Devil Run was released on March 17, 2010, with the song "Run Devil Run" serving as the follow-up single.

Both Oh! and Run Devil Run were commercially successful in South Korea; Oh! ranked as the second best-selling release of 2010 on the Gaon Album Chart, with sales of 197,934 copies. Run Devil Run additionally ranked as the fourth best-selling release of the year, with 136,851 copies sold. Taken together, these sales made Oh! the best-selling album of the year, exceeding the combined total of Super Junior's Bonamana and its repackage. Accordingly, at the 25th Golden Disc Awards, Girls' Generation became the first female group to win the Album Daesang prize in the ceremony's history with Oh!.

== Background and release ==
Initial interest for Oh! was high, as physical and online pre-orders of the album totaled 150,000 copies. Upon the album's full release, various album tracks charted in the top ten of various charts. In April 2010, one of the songs in their album entitled, "Forever" was featured on the OST of the drama Pasta. On its first day of sale, Oh! sold 30,000 copies. The album was released internationally via iTunes on February 8, 2010. The group began promoting their album on MBC's Show! Music Core on January 30. The group also performed "Show! Show! Show!" as a part of their special comeback performance on Show! Music Core and Inkigayo. The album is credited as being the first K-pop album to include photocards.

A repackaged version of the album, titled Run Devil Run, contained a new concept based around a "Dark Girls' Generation" theme. The new single "Run Devil Run" was released as a digital single on March 17, 2010. The demo version of the song was originally recorded by Kesha; however, the song's rights were then sold to SM Entertainment and subsequently given to Girls' Generation. The music video was released on March 18, with the group's first comeback performance taking place on Music Bank.

== Singles ==
Kenzie, a songwriter who previously composed the group's debut single "Into the New World", also composed "Oh!". "Oh!" was released to digital music sites on January 25, 2010, and quickly topped various digital music charts within 10 minutes of release. It reached number one on the Gaon Digital Chart.

"Run Devil Run" was written by American songwriters, Alex James and Busbee, with Swedish songwriter Kalle Engström. The song was first recorded by American singer-songwriter Kesha in 2008 while pre-production of her debut album, Animal (2010) was underway; however, Kesha never included the song on the album. The song remained untouched for the next two years until executives at Universal Music Group sold the rights of the song to SM Entertainment. After this, Korean songwriter Hong Ji-yoo was brought on to translate and rearrange the English version of the song into Korean.

"Run Devil Run" received its first music show award on Music Bank, where it won over Kara's "Lupin" and 2AM's "I Was Wrong". It was ranked at number one on the Gaon Digital Chart for two weeks, making it their second number-one single on the chart. The B-side tracks also showed strong chart performance, with "Star Star Star" recording 1,480,417 digital downloads while "Show Show Show" recorded 1,020,710 digital downloads in 2010.

== Critical reception ==
Han Dong-yoon of IZM felt that "Oh" was less interesting musically compared to "Gee" and "Genie". Han also gave Run Devil Run a negative review, where he questioned the group's abrupt change in concept by writing "The person who used to cutely cling to you and call you Yeon-buk oppa has now changed her attitude 180 degrees, saying she will now kick you to the curb". Seong Won-ho of the same publication gave the single "Run Devil Run" 1.5 stars out of 5, feeling that the translated Korean lyrics and vocals were a downgrade from the original version by Kesha.

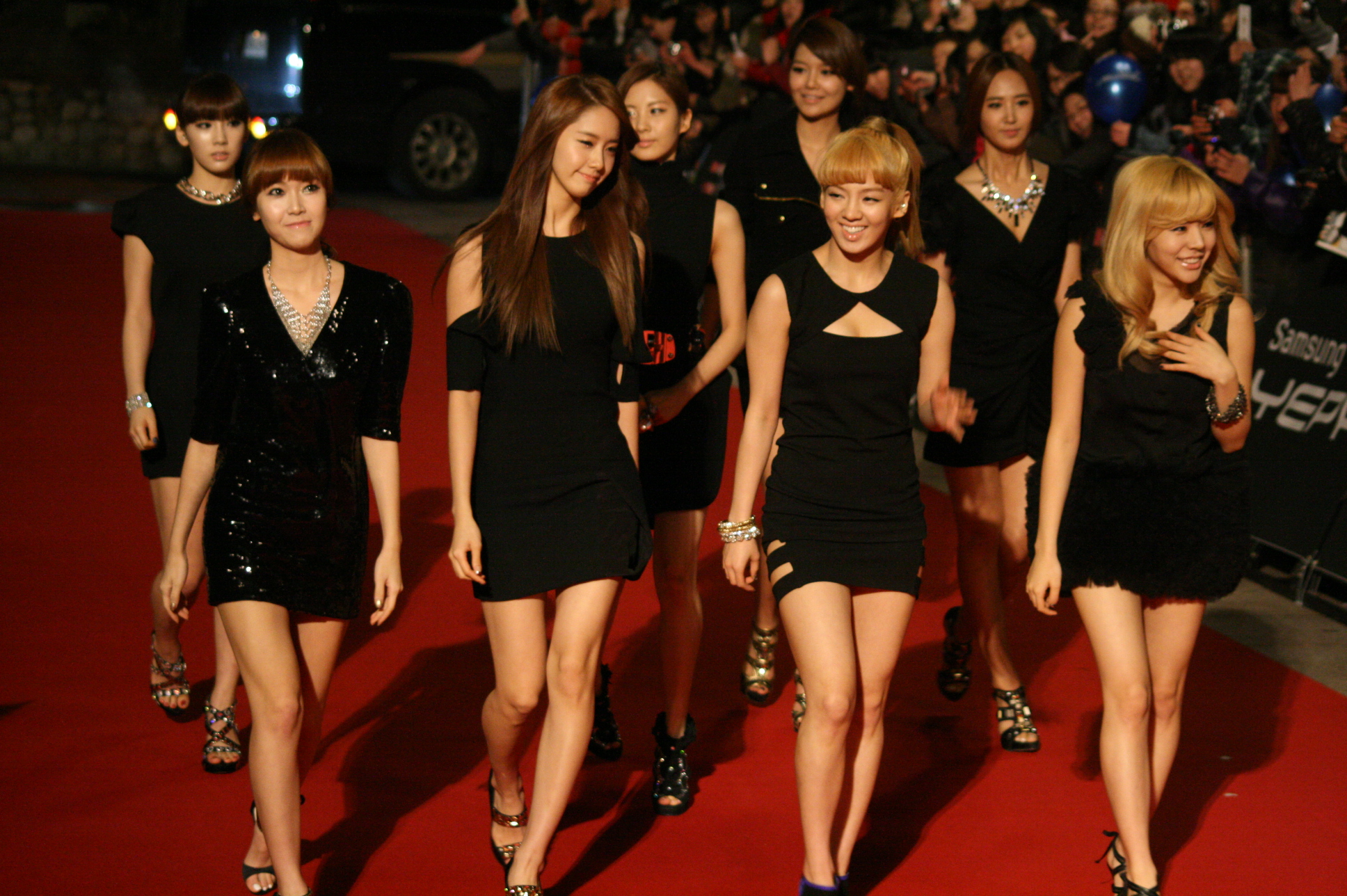
Girls' Generation at the 25th Golden Disc Awards, where they won Album Daesang with Oh!

=== Accolades ===
Awards and nominations
Organization	Year	Category	Result	Ref.
Golden Disc Awards	2010	Album Daesang (Grand Prize)	Won	
Golden Disc Awards	2010	Album Bonsang (Main Prize)	Won	
Melon Music Awards	2010	Album of the Year	Nominated	
Taiwan KKBox Awards	2011	Album of the Year (for Run Devil Run)	Won	

== Promotion and live performances ==
"Oh!" was first performed live on January 30, 2010, on MBC's Music Core, as part of their "comeback stage". They also performed "Show! Show! Show!" However, there was a technical error in MBC's broadcast, with a few seconds of dead air near the end of the performance; the network was subsequently flooded with complaints. The incident was then parodied on YouTube, mixing in clips of the Korean drama IRIS, receiving attention from Korean netizens. The group followed up with their second performance on Inkigayo the following day.

Starting from March 11, 2010, photos of the members were released online showcasing a dark concept, so called Black SoShi. In the run of promotions for the song, an official iPhone application was released, available in free and paid versions. The free version has 30-second previews for all the songs on the album, a music video for “Run Devil Run” and a few photographs. The paid version has full tracks for all the songs on the album, music videos for "Run Devil Run", "Gee", "Oh!" and "Genie", and a photo gallery. They concluded their song promotions by the May 2, 2010, on Inkigayo. Beginning in 2011, the group embarked on their Girls' Generation Tour, which started on July 23, 2011, at the Olympic Gymnastics Arena in Seoul and ended at the Impact Arena in Bangkok on February 12, 2012.

== Track listing ==
Oh! track listing
No.	Title	Lyrics	Music	Arrangement	Length
1.	"Oh!"	Kim Jeong-bae; Young-hu Kim	Kenzie	Kenzie	3:08
2.	"Show! Show! Show!"	Kim Boo-min	Hitchhiker	Hitchhiker	3:38
3.	"Sweet Talking Baby" (Korean: 뻔 & Fun; RR: Ppeon & Fun)	Song Jae-won	Song Jae-won	Song Jae-won	3:30
4.	"Forever" (영원히 너와 꿈꾸고 싶다; Yeongwonhi neowa kkumkkugo sipda; lit. 'I Want to Dream With You Forever')	Kim Jin-hwan	Kim Jin-hwan	Kim Jin-hwan	4:29
5.	"Be Happy" (웃자; Utja)	Kim Young-deuk; Ahn Myung-won	Kim Young-deuk; Ahn Myung-won	E-Tribe; Jang Jun-ho (Duble Kick Entertainment); Gong Hyun-sik (Duble Kick Entertainment	3:30
6.	"Boys & Girls" (화성인 바이러스; Hwaseong-in Baireoseu; lit. 'Martian Virus') (Featuring Key of SHINee)	Hwang Chan-hee; Jo Eun-hee	Hwang Chan-hee	Park Joon-ho	3:45
7.	"Talk to Me" (카라멜 커피; Karamel Keopi; lit. 'Caramel Coffee') (Jessica and Tiffany duet)	Machan Taylor; Kim Hee-won (Duble Kick Entertainment)	Machan Taylor	Machan Taylor	3:26
8.	"Star Star Star" (별별별; Byeolbyeolbyeol)	Kim Young-deuk; Ahn Myung-won	Kim Young-deuk; Ahn Myung-won	E-Tribe; Go Myung-jae	4:29
9.	"Stick wit U" (무조건 해피엔딩; Mujogeon Haepiending; lit. 'Unconditional Happy Ending')	LeeOn	LeeOn	LeeOn	2:46
10.	"Day by Day" (좋은 일만 생각하기; Joheun Ilman Saenggakhagi; lit. 'Only Thinking About Good Things') (Performed by Taeyeon, Jessica, Tiffany, Seohyun, and Sunny)	Yoo Young-seok	Yoo Young-seok	Miho (Miso Diary)	3:50
11.	"Gee" (bonus track)	Kim Young-deuk; Ahn Myung-won	Kim Young-deuk; Ahn Myung-won	E-Tribe	3:20
12.	"Genie" (소원을 말해봐 (지니); Sowoneul Malhaebwa (Jini); lit. 'Tell Me Your Wish') (bonus track)	Yoo Young-jin	Anne Judith Stokke Wik; Robin Jenssen; Ronny Vidar Svendsen; Nermin Harambašić; Fridolin Nordsø; Yoo Young-jin	Yoo Han-jin	3:49
Total length:					43:40

Run Devil Run – repackage (bonus tracks)
No.	Title	Lyrics	Music	Arrangement	Length
1.	"Run Devil Run"	Hong Ji-yoo	Michael Busbee; Alex James (Alex Read); Kalle Engström	Michael Busbee; Alex James (Alex Read); Kalle Engström	3:21
2.	"Oh!"	Kim Jeong-bae; Young-hu Kim	Kenzie	Kenzie	3:08
3.	"Echo"	Taehoon	Thomas Troelsen; Mikkel Remee Sigvardt; Lucas Secon	Thomas Troelsen; Mikkel Remee Sigvardt; Lucas Secon	3:30
4.	"Star Star Star (Acoustic R&B version)" (Korean: 별별별; RR: Byeolbyeolbyeol)	Kim Young-deuk; Ahn Myung-won	Kim Young-deuk; Ahn Myung-won	E-Tribe; Go Myung-jae	4:28
5.	"Show! Show! Show!"	Kim Boo-min	Hitchhiker	Michael Busbee	3:38
6.	"Sweet Talking Baby" (뻔 & Fun; Ppeon & Fun)	Song Jae-won	Song Jae-won	Song Jae-won	3:30
7.	"Forever" (영원히 너와 꿈꾸고 싶다; Yeongwonhi neowa kkumkkugo sipda; lit. 'I Want to Dream With You Forever')	Kim Jin-hwan	Kim Jin-hwan	Kim Jin-hwan	4:29
8.	"Be Happy" (웃자; Utja)	Kim Young-deuk; Ahn Myung-won	Kim Young-deuk; Ahn Myung-won	E-Tribe; Jang Jun-ho (Duble Kick Entertainment); Gong Hyun-sik (Duble Kick Entertainment	3:30
9.	"Boys & Girls" (화성인 바이러스; Hwaseong-in Baireoseu; lit. 'Martian Virus') (Featuring Key of SHINee)	Hwang Chan-hee; Jo Eun-hee	Hwang Chan-hee	Park Joon-ho	3:45
10.	"Talk to Me" (카라멜 커피; Karamel Kapi; lit. 'Caramel Coffee') (Jessica and Tiffany duet)	Machan Taylor; Kim Hee-won (Duble Kick Entertainment)	Machan Taylor	Machan Taylor	3:26
11.	"Star Star Star" (별별별; Byeolbyeolbyeol)	Kim Young-deuk; Ahn Myung-won	Kim Young-deuk; Ahn Myung-won	E-Tribe; Go Myung-jae	4:29
12.	"Stick wit U" (무조건 해피엔딩; Mujogeon Haepiending; lit. 'Unconditional Happy Ending')	LeeOn	LeeOn	LeeOn	2:46
13.	"Day by Day" (좋은 일만 생각하기; Joheun Ilman Saenggakhagi; lit. 'Only Thinking About Good Things') (Performed by Taeyeon, Jessica, Tiffany, Seohyun, and Sunny)	Yoo Young-seok	Yoo Young-seok	Miho (Miso Diary)	3:50
14.	"Gee" (bonus track)	Kim Young-deuk; Ahn Myung-won	Kim Young-deuk; Ahn Myung-won	E-Tribe	3:20
15.	"Genie" (소원을 말해봐 (지니); Sowoneul Malhaebwa (Jini); lit. 'Tell Me Your Wish') (bonus track)	Yoo Young-jin	Anne Judith Stokke Wik; Robin Jenssen; Ronny Vidar Svendsen; Nermin Harambašić; Fridolin Nordsø; Yoo Young-jin	Yoo Han-jin	3:49
Total length:					55:40

== Charts ==
=== Weekly charts ===
Chart (2010)	Peak position
Japanese Albums (Oricon)	54
South Korean Albums (Gaon)	1
South Korean Albums (Gaon) reissue Run Devil Run	1

=== Year-end charts ===
Chart (2010)	Position
South Korean Albums (Gaon)	2
South Korean Albums (Gaon) reissue Run Devil Run	4

Chart (2011)	Position
South Korean Albums (Gaon)	76
South Korean Albums (Gaon) reissue Run Devil Run	44

== Sales ==
Sales for Oh! and Run Devil Run
Region	Sales amount
Japan (Oh!)	9,318
Japan (Run Devil Run)	26,751
South Korea (Oh!)	247,520
South Korea (Run Devil Run)	191,779

== Release history ==
Region	Date	Version	Distributing label	Format
South Korea	January 28, 2010	Oh!	SM Entertainment	CD
Japan	February 2, 2010	Oh!	Rhythm Zone	CD
Hong Kong	February 19, 2010	Oh!	Avex Asia	CD
Thailand	March 9, 2010	Oh!	GMM Grammy (2010–2011); SM True (2012–present)	CD
Taiwan	March 12, 2010	Oh!	Avex Taiwan	CD
Philippines	March 19, 2010	Oh!	Universal Records	CD
South Korea	March 22, 2010	Run Devil Run	SM Entertainment	CD
Taiwan	April 23, 2010	Run Devil Run	Avex Taiwan	CD
Philippines	May 22, 2010 (special release)	Run Devil Run	Universal Records	CD
Philippines	May 29, 2010 (official release)	Run Devil Run	Universal Records	CD
