= Gee (EP) =

2009 EP by Girls' Generation

EP by Girls' Generation
- Released: January 7, 2009
- Recorded: November – December 2008
- Studio: SM Studios (Seoul)
- Genre: K-pop
- Length: 18:06
- Language: Korean
- Labels: SM; Dreamus
- Producer: Lee Soo-man

Girls' Generation chronology
Girls' Generation (2007)	Gee (2009)	Genie (2009)

Singles from Gee
- 1. "Gee" Released: January 5, 2009

Gee is the first extended play (EP) by South Korean girl group Girls' Generation. It was released on January 7, 2009, by SM Entertainment.

== Single ==
A week after its release, "Gee" went number one on Music Bank; however, questions were raised when the group did not appear on the program for unknown reasons, with rumors spreading regarding a possible rift between SM Entertainment and KBS. "Gee" also went to number one on SBS's Inkigayo a week after their return.

"Gee" first tied with "Nobody" by the Wonder Girls for the longest-running number one on music portal M.Net (6 weeks). The song then broke the record by staying on top a seventh week, and remained in the position for an eighth week. It also tied then broke the record for longest-running number one on KBS's Music Bank, beating the 7-week record previously set by Jewelry in 2008 with "One More Time". "Gee" achieved its ninth number one on the show on March 13, 2009 and received its 10th number one win on June 26, 2009.

The track also showed strength on other charts, topping the Mujikon, Melon and Mnet charts for eight consecutive weeks, the Dosirak chart for seven weeks, the Muse chart for six weeks, and the Baksu chart for four weeks. "Gee" topped Cyworld's hourly music chart on the release day. The song also went number one on all major digital music charts within two days. "Gee" was also ranked as the number one song of the decade by one of Korea's most popular online music websites, MelOn.

== Commercial performance ==
SM Entertainment stated that over 100,000 copies of the mini-album were shipped to stores while sales analyst company Hanteo reported sales in excess of 30,000 copies within the first 10 days of its release. According to their agency SM Entertainment, the album sold nearly 65,000 copies. Gee was able to sell more than 100,000 copies.

== Track listing ==
Credits adapted from Naver

Gee track listing
No.	Title	Lyrics	Music	Arrangement	Length
1.	"Gee"	E-Tribe	E-Tribe	E-Tribe	3:20
2.	"Way to Go!" (힘내!; Himnae!)	Kim Jeong-bae	Kenzie	Kenzie	3:04
3.	"Dear Mom"	The Lighthouse	NODAY; Taesung Kim (Iconic Sounds)	NODAY; Taesung Kim (Iconic Sounds)	4:05
4.	"Destiny"	Choi Gap Won	Alex James (Alex Read); Louis Read (Alex Read)	Ahn Ik-soo	3:26
5.	"Let's Talk About Love" (힘들어하는 연인들을 위해; Himdeureohaneun yeonindeureul wihae; 'For Those in Need')	Young-hu Kim	Young-hu Kim	Young-hu Kim	4:11
Total length:					18:06

== Personnel ==
- Girls' Generation – main and backing vocals
- Lee Soo-man – producer

== Release history ==
Country	Date	Label	Format
South Korea	January 7, 2009	SM Entertainment	CD
Philippines	January 29, 2009	Universal Records	CD
Taiwan	February 13, 2009	Avex Taiwan	CD
