= Girls' Generation Complete Video Collection =

Video by Girls' Generation
- Released: September 26, 2012
- Recorded: 2007 – 2012
- Genre: K-pop, pop, dance-pop, teen pop, bubblegum pop, J-Pop, electropop
- Length: 163 min. and 6 sec.
- Language: Korean, English, Japanese
- Label: S.M. Entertainment, Nayutawave Records

Girls' Generation chronology
The 1st Japan Tour DVD (2011)	Girls' Generation Complete Video Collection (2012)	Girls' Generation Tour DVD (2012)

Girls' Generation Complete Video Collection is the sixth music DVD and Blu-ray release from South Korean girl group Girls' Generation. It was released on September 26, 2012 in Japan.

== History ==
The Blu-ray/DVD features all their music videos, Japanese, Korean and English, as well as performances from their first Japanese tour. It will be released in four versions; regular Blu-ray and DVD editions coming with a poster (first press only) and limited Blu-ray and DVD boxsets housed in a film can, including a bonus disc with interview footage of the members talking about their music videos, two deluxe booklets, playing cards, a mobile earphone jack, a ballpoint pen with a projector playing with a member's image (one randomly chosen between nine kinds), and 10 postcards. Comes in a large tin case (Diameter: 28 cm approx.). First Press Comes with Poster.

== Track list ==
=== DVD 1 (Interview) [First Press edition] ===
No.	Title	Length
1.	"Long interview with nine members"	57:00
Total length:		57:00

=== DVD 2 (Japanese Ver.) ===
No.	Title	Length
1.	"Genie (Japanese Ver.)"	4:26
2.	"Genie (Dance ver.)"	3:32
3.	"Gee (Japanese Ver.)"	3:36
4.	"Gee (Dance Ver)"	3:22
5.	"Run Devil Run (Japanese Ver.)"	3:37
6.	"Run Devil Run (Japanese Dance Ver.)"	3:25
7.	"Mr. Taxi"	3:46
8.	"Mr. Taxi (Dance Ver.)"	3:38
9.	"Bad Girl"	4:05
10.	"Time Machine"	5:39
11.	"Paparazzi"	6:37
12.	"Mr. Taxi ≪from Japan 1ST Tour Re-EDIT≫ "	3:53
13.	"The Great Escape ≪from Japan 1ST Tour Re-EDIT≫ "	3:51
14.	"Gee ≪from Japan 1ST Tour Re-EDIT≫ "	3:40
Total length:		57:07

=== DVD 3 (Korean Ver.) ===
No.	Title	Length
1.	"Into The New World"	4:53
2.	"Girls' Generation"	3:56
3.	"Kissing You"	3:21
4.	"Gee"	3:54
5.	"Genie"	4:02
6.	"Oh!"	3:34
7.	"Run Devil Run"	3:28
8.	"Run Devil Run (Story Ver.)"	3:47
9.	"Hoot"	4:13
10.	"Hoot (Dance Ver.)"	3:11
11.	"The Boys"	5:20
12.	"The Boys ≪English Ver.≫"	5:20
Total length:		48:59

== Chart performance ==
The DVD and Blu-ray for “Girls’ Generation Complete Video Collection” reached number one on the “Oricon Weekly DVD” and “Oricon Weekly Blu-Ray” charts, with 40,000 DVDs and 19,000 Blu-ray discs sold. This is the first time Girls’ Generation earned first-place rankings on the single and Blu-ray charts since their Japanese debut in September 2010. They are the first female artist or group to reach number one on all three charts — Oricon's Weekly Single, DVD, and Blu-ray Rankings — in the same week. The only other group to accomplish this same feat was Mr. Children, a Japanese pop rock band formed in 1988.

=== Charts ===
Chart	Peak position	Chart Run
Oricon Daily DVD Chart	1	25 weeks
Oricon Weekly DVD Chart	1	25 weeks

=== Sales and certifications ===
Chart	Amount
Oricon physical sales	88,620+
RIAJ physical shipping certification	Gold (100,000+)

== Release history ==
Country	Date	Distributing label	Format
Japan	September 26, 2012	Nayutawave Records	DVD, Blu-ray
Hong Kong	November 6, 2012	Universal Music	DVD, Blu-ray
Taiwan	November 16, 2012	Universal Music	DVD, Blu-ray
Thailand	November 27, 2012	Universal Music	DVD, Blu-ray
