= On Stage Everybody =

1945 film by Jean Yarbrough

- Directed by: Jean Yarbrough
- Production company: Universal Pictures
- Distributed by: Universal Pictures
- Release date: July 13, 1945
- Running time: 75 minutes
- Country: United States
- Language: English

On Stage Everybody is a 1945 American musical film directed by Jean Yarbrough and starring Jack Oakie, Peggy Ryan, and Johnny Coy. Also appearing are Otto Kruger, Esther Dale, Milburn Stone, Wallace Ford, Julie London, and The King Sisters, who sang "Stuff Like That There".

== Plot ==
Private detective Fitzgerald recounts the story of vaudeville performer Tim Sullivan and his daughter Molly. The two struggle to make a living as a stage act, in part because Tim refuses to have anything to do with radio, which he sees as a threat to vaudeville. Unknown to them, Fitzgerald has been hired by an anonymous benefactor to help them financially.

Fitzgerald gets Tim and Molly an engagement in Fulton's Follies, but Tim is dismissed when he refuses to appear on the radio. After losing their hotel room, they return to Ma Cassidy's boarding house and reunite with fellow performers Emmet Rogers and his son Danny. Tim later takes a job at Emmet's department store, only to find himself assigned to its radio department. He destroys the radio equipment and is jailed, but bailed out by James Carlton, a radio executive who is also Molly's grandfather.

Tim then learns that Carlton has been the source of the money Fitzgerald has been providing. Carlton argues that Molly would be better off with his family, and Tim reluctantly sends her to live with them. Although Molly initially struggles with the family's more formal way of life, she wins them over after revealing her ability as a performer.

Tim moves into an Actors' Home, where listening to the World Series on the radio begins to soften his opposition to the medium. With Molly's encouragement, he develops a radio variety program built around unemployed vaudeville acts. Carlton agrees to arrange a trial broadcast for the proposed show, On Stage Everybody, but prospective sponsors object that Tim is not a sufficiently well-known host. When listener mail supports the program, Tim is retained as its host and the broadcast becomes successful.

== Cast ==
- Ilene Woods as Talent Show Winner

== Stuff Like That There ==
The film includes the song "Stuff Like That There", performed by The King Sisters. The music was written by Jay Livingston and lyrics by Ray Evans. It was also recorded and released as a single by Betty Hutton in December 1945.

In 1991, the song was performed by Bette Midler in the motion picture For the Boys. It was later performed by Kelly Clarkson on Big Band night, American Idol season 1, and by Seohyun of South Korean girl group Girls' Generation during their first Japanese Tour and second Asia tour.
