= Gee (Girls' Generation song) =

2009 single by Girls' Generation

- Japanese version cover

Single by Girls' Generation

from the EP Gee and the album Oh! and Girls' Generation
- Released: January 5, 2009 (South Korea); October 20, 2010 (Japan)
- Studio: SM Concert Hall; SM Yellow Tail (Seoul)
- Genre: Bubblegum; electropop; Europop
- Length: 3:21
- Label: SM; Nayutawave
- Composer: E-Tribe
- Lyricists: E-Tribe; Kanata Nakamura (Japanese version)
- Producer: E-Tribe

Girls' Generation singles chronology
"Baby Baby" (2008)	"Gee" (2009)	"Genie" (2009)

Girls' Generation Japanese singles chronology
"Genie" (2010)	"Gee" (2010)	"Hoot" (2010)

Music video
- "Gee" on YouTube

"Gee" is a song by South Korean girl group Girls' Generation, who originally recorded a Korean-language version for an extended play (EP) that was released in South Korea by SM Entertainment on January 5, 2009. Nayutawave Records released a Japanese-language version of "Gee" on October 20, 2010, as the group's second single in Japan. Music duo E-Tribe wrote and produced the track, and Kanata Nakamura wrote additional Japanese lyrics.

"Gee" is primarily a bubblegum track with an electropop and Europop sound brought by prominent techno- and hip hop-influenced synthesizers and beats. The lyrics are about first love from a young female perspective. The song was supported by a music video depicting the group members as mannequins who, after the shop owner leaves, come to life and perform the choreography in colored skinny jeans. It became the first girl-group video to amass 100 million views on YouTube.

In South Korea, "Gee" was the number-one song on the music program Music Bank for nine consecutive weeks in 2009 and the top-performing song of the 2000s decade on the digital music platform Melon. According to a 2009 poll by Gallup Korea, it was the year's most popular song. In Japan, it peaked at number two on the Oricon Singles Chart and number one on the RIAJ Digital Track Chart, and the Recording Industry Association of Japan (RIAJ) certified that it sold over one million digital copies.

"Gee" won Song of the Year at both the Melon Music Awards and the Korean Music Awards, and received the Digital Daesang at the 24th Golden Disc Awards in 2009. Music critics have recognized "Gee" as a K-pop standard that helped define the contemporary bubblegum pop sound, attributing its enduring popularity in part to its music video. Rolling Stone named it the greatest song in the history of Korean pop music in 2023, and one of the 250 greatest songs of the 21st century in 2025, ranking it at number 170.

== Background and release ==
South Korean entertainment agency SM Entertainment launched Girls' Generation, a nine-member idol girl group, in August 2007. In November, SM released the group's debut studio album, which was supported by singles including "Into the New World" and "Girls' Generation"; the latter of which was among the top three most popular songs of 2007 according to a Gallup Korea public poll. The album was succeeded with a reissue titled Baby Baby in March 2008. Girls' Generation sold over 100,000 copies of their debut album in South Korea, ranking among the period's commercially successful idol groups.

On January 5, 2009, SM released Gee, the group's first extended play (EP) (known in South Korea as "mini album"). SM had planned to release "Dancing Queen", a cover version of Duffy's single "Mercy (2008), as the title track. The plan was inspired by the "retro" music trend caused by fellow idol group Wonder Girls' hit single "Nobody" (2008). It was scrapped due to copyright issues. Production duo E-Tribe, who wrote "Gee", pitched the song to SM, who thought the lyrics were childish and the melody weak. E-Tribe maintained their position, and SM selected "Gee" as the title track. It was released as the lead single onto South Korean digital music platforms.

After Girls' Generation's domestic success, SM extended their promotional activities to Japan. In September 2010, the group signed with Universal Music Japan-owned Nayutawave Records. Their first Japanese single was the Japanese-language version of "Genie", which had been released in South Korea prior. Nayutawave released the Japanese-language version of "Gee" on October 20, 2010, as the group's second Japanese single.

== Music and lyrics ==
"Gee"
"Gee" is a bubblegum song with an electropop and Europop sound. The production incorporates techno- and hip hop-influenced synthesizers and beats.

"Gee" was written, arranged, and produced by E-Tribe, a production duo consisting of Ahn Myung-won and Kim Young-deuk. It was recorded at SM's Concert Hall and Yellow Tail Studios in Seoul, South Korea. The track is three minutes and 21 seconds long. The Japanese version's lyrics were written by Kanata Nakamura.

"Gee" is an upbeat track that uses dense synthesizers. Rolling Stone described the synthesizers as "glittering Shibuya-kei", and Billboard found them to be influenced by techno. The track is accentuated with chimes at the beginning and pulsing electropop beats throughout. Music critics categorized the sound as bubblegum, Europop, and electropop. The A.V. Club characterized the track as "a three-minute aural mélange of techno, bubblegum pop, and hip-hop". The group members sing in high-registered vocals accentuated with electronic processing including bleeps and clicks. According to musicologist Michael Fuhr, this vocal technique demonstrates aegyo, a Korean concept for cuteness in an adolescent, feminine way. The lyrics talk about the girls' feelings when they fall in love.

== Music video ==
The music video for the Korean version of "Gee" begins with the nine members being displayed as mannequins at a clothing store and coming to life after the store's male staff (played by Minho of Shinee) leaves. The members then discover the surroundings and find out the portrait of Minho being "the employee of the month". Scenes of the members performing the choreography are juxtaposed with the storyline. At the end of the video, the members leave the store and Minho returns realizing the mannequins have disappeared. The video became the first video by a girl group to achieve over 100 million views on YouTube. Another music video for the Japanese version was also released, which also features Minho as the male staff, but does not portray the members as mannequins but Minho's fellow female staff.

== Reception ==
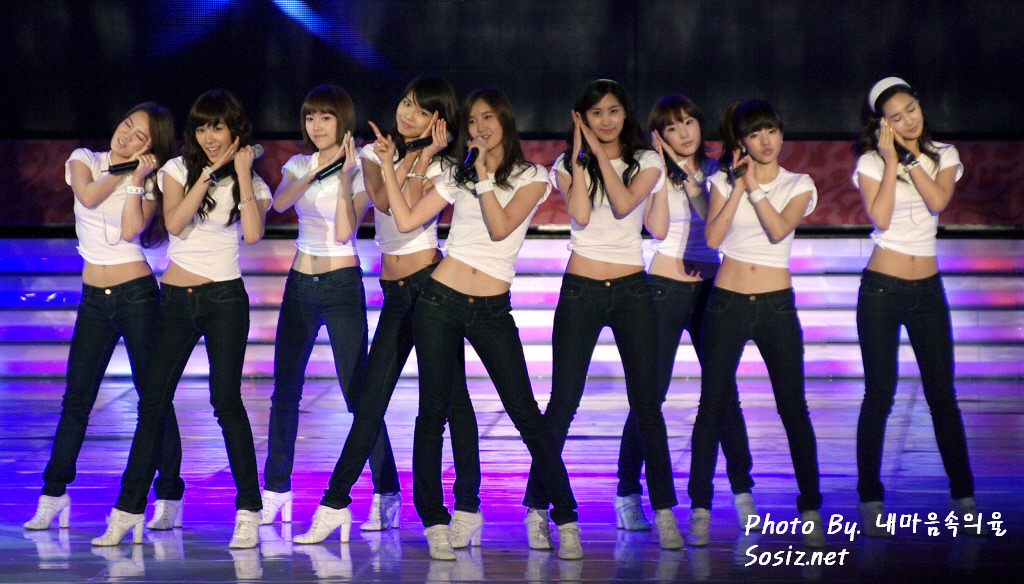
Girls' Generation performing "Gee" on February 27, 2009.

Girls' Generation had their first promotional activity for the song on MBC's music show Music Core on January 10, 2009. "Gee" eventually became a hit, achieving nine consecutive weeks at number one on KBS's Music Bank, and eight consecutive wins on the Mnet's chart, setting a record at the time. It was named as the Song of the Decade by South Korea's online music website Melon, and chosen to be the most popular song of 2009 on Music Bank. The song has also won several major awards such as Digital Daesang and Digital Bonsang at the 24th Golden Disc Awards, the Daesang and Digital Music awards at the 19th Seoul Music Awards, and Song of the Year at the 7th Korean Music Awards.

The Japanese version sold 130,145 physical copies in 2010, becoming the 49^{th} best-selling single of the year in Japan. The song reached number one on the RIAJ's weekly digital track chart on October 26, and eventually was ranked fifty-seventh and twenty-third on Billboard's 2010 & 2011 Japan Hot 100 charts, respectively. In January 2014, "Gee" was certified "Million" by the RIAJ, achieving more than one million digital downloads. The song is also the group's best-selling single in the US with 80,000 downloads sold as of May 2020.

== Accolades ==
"Gee" won 14 first place music program awards in South Korea, and received a record nine consecutive wins on Music Bank until Psy's "Gangnam Style" in 2012.

Awards and nominations for "Gee"
Year	Organization	Award	Result	Ref.
2009	Bugs Music Awards	Song of the Year	Nominated	
2009	Cyworld Digital Music Awards	Song of the Month – January	Won	
2009	Cyworld Digital Music Awards	Bonsang Award (Top 10)	Won	
2009	Golden Disc Awards	Digital Bonsang	Won	
2009	Golden Disc Awards	Digital Daesang	Won	
2009	KBS Song Festival	Song of the Year	Nominated	
2009	Melon Music Awards	Song of the Year	Won	
2009	Melon Music Awards	Odyssey Award	Won	
2009	Mnet 20's Choice Awards	Hot Online Song	Nominated	
2009	Mnet Asian Music Awards	Best Dance Performance	Nominated	
2009	Mnet Asian Music Awards	Best Female Group	Nominated	
2009	Philippine K-pop Awards	Music Video of the Year	Won	
2010	Korean Music Awards	Best Dance & Electronic Song	Nominated	
2010	Korean Music Awards	Song of the Year	Won	
2010	Seoul Music Awards	Best Song	Won	
2010	Seoul Music Awards	Popularity Award	Nominated	

Music program awards
Program	Date	Ref.
Music Bank	January 16, 2009	
Music Bank	January 23, 2009	
Music Bank	January 30, 2009	
Music Bank	February 6, 2009	
Music Bank	February 13, 2009	
Music Bank	February 20, 2009	
Music Bank	February 27, 2009	
Music Bank	March 6, 2009	
Music Bank	March 13, 2009	
Music Bank	June 26, 2009	
Music Bank	December 25, 2009	
Inkigayo	January 18, 2009	
Inkigayo	February 1, 2009	
Inkigayo	February 8, 2009	

== In popular culture ==
A parody of "Gee", called "Hee", has gained popularity among Korean citizens. It is a combination of the instrumental of 'Gee' and confrontational dialogue from the drama Temptation of Wife.

In 2009 and 2010, SM labelmates Super Junior regularly included a cover of "Gee" on their Super Show 2 tour, introduced by a comedic video interlude featuring both groups. "Gee" was the opening theme song of the film "To All the Boys: Always and Forever".

== Legacy ==
In 2009, the success of songs such as "Gee" and Super Junior's "Sorry Sorry" helped raise interest in K-Pop as the Korean wave began spreading across Asia through digital media and online sharing sites.

"Gee" has been widely recognized as a K-pop classic and the group's signature song.

The song's choreography, built around a repeated pointing hook that fans nicknamed the 'crab dance,' circulated widely, and the brightly colored skinny jeans the members wore in the video influenced fashion trends in South Korea.

On writing the group's biography for AllMusic, Chris True selected "Gee" as one of their outstanding songs. Chuck Eddy from Spin ranked the single fifth on his list of the 21 greatest K-pop songs of all time in 2012, opining that the song has set up the group's "huge deals" ever since. Pitchfork Media editor Jakob Dorof included the song on his list of 20 essential K-pop songs in 2014, noting it for being the "magnum opus" of modern Korean bubblegum pop genre, which he regarded as K-pop's "comfort zone." Dorof also described the song as "formally irrefutable" and credited it, in hyperbolic terms, with briefly easing long-standing cultural tensions between South Korea and Japan. Abigail Covington writing for The A.V. Club regarded Girls' Generation as the K-pop "premier, ubiquitous provider," particularly with "Gee", which she said showcased Korean music's potential, noting that K-pop had predated the group's 2007 debut. Billboard magazine labelled "Gee" "arguably the most iconic K-pop song in the past ten years."

In 2016, "Gee" was voted the top K-pop girl group song in the past 20 years in a poll involving 2,000 people and 30 music industry experts by South Korean magazine Dong-a Ilbo, web magazine Idology and research company M Brain. In a panel of 35 music critics and industry professionals organized by Melon and newspaper Seoul Shinmun, "Gee" was ranked the fifth best idol song of all-time, crediting the song as one of the catalysts of the popularization of idol/K-pop. Music critic Jiseon Choi believed that "through the rise of 'Gee', the year 2009 was heated up and became the protagonist of a nationwide syndrome." In 2023, Rolling Stone named "Gee" the greatest song in the history of Korean pop music, referring to it as "a pure distillation of the giddiness of infatuation".

"Gee" on select critic lists and polls
Publication	Year	List	Rank	Ref.
Billboard	2017	10 Greatest K-pop Choruses of the 21st Century	1	
Billboard	2017	Every Girls' Generation Single Ranked	3	
Billboard	2018	The 100 Greatest Music Videos of the 21st Century	92	
The Dong-a Ilbo	2016	Best Female Idol Songs in the Past 20 Years	1	
Gallup Korea	2009	Most Popular Songs of 2009	1	
Gallup Korea	2024	10 Most Beloved K-pop Songs of the 21st Century	6	
Melon	2021	Top 100 K-pop Songs of All Time	5	
Mnet	2014	Legend 100 Songs	No order	
Music Y	2014	120 Best Dance Tracks of All Time	5	
Pitchfork	2014	20 Essential K-pop Songs	No order	
Research Panel Korea	2013	Best hit idol songs of all time	3	
Rolling Stone	2023	100 Greatest Songs in the History of Korean Pop Music	1	
Rolling Stone	2025	The 250 Greatest Songs of the 21st Century	170	
Spin	2012	The 21 Greatest K-pop Songs of All Time	5	
Star News	2014	10 Best Digital Hit Songs in the Past 10 Years	No order	

== Track listing ==
CD single — Japanese version
No.	Title	Lyrics	Music	Length
1.	"Gee" (Japanese version)	Kanata Nakamura	E-Tribe	3:23
2.	"Gee" (Korean version)	E-Tribe	E-Tribe	3:23
3.	"Gee" (without main vocal)		E-Tribe	3:21
Total length:				10:05

DVD — Japanese version
No.	Title	Length
1.	"Gee" (music video)
2.	"Gee" (Dance version)

== Credits and personnel ==
Credits adapted from album's liner notes.

Studio

- SM Concert Hall Studio – recording, mixing
- SM Yellow Tail Studio – recording
- Sonic Korea – mastering

Personnel

- SM Entertainment – executive producer
- Lee Soo-man – producer
- Girls' Generation – vocals, background vocals
- E-Tribe – producer, Korean lyrics, composition, arrangement, vocal directing
- Kanata Nakamura – Japanese lyrics
- Sugarflow – background vocals
- Go Myung-jae – guitar
- Nam Koong-jin – recording, mixing
- Lee Seong-ho – recording
- Jeon Hoon – mastering

== Charts ==
=== Weekly charts ===
Chart (2010)	Peak position
Japan (Oricon)	2
Japan (Japan Hot 100)	2
Japan Adult Contemporary (Billboard)	1
Japan Digital (RIAJ)	1
South Korean Albums (Gaon) (Note: The Korean version of "Gee" was released in 2009, therefore it did not enter the Gaon Digital Chart, which launched in 2010. The Japanese version peaked at number three on the Gaon Album Chart in 2011.)	3

=== Year-end charts ===
Chart (2010)	Position
Japan (Oricon)	49
Japan (Japan Hot 100)	57
Japan (RIAJ Digital Track Chart)	42
Japan Adult Contemporary (Billboard Japan)	71

Chart (2011)	Position
Japan (Japan Hot 100)	23
South Korean Int'l Albums (Gaon)	8

== Certifications ==
Region	Certification	Certified units/sales
Japan (RIAJ) physical single	Gold	100,000^{^}
Japan (RIAJ) Ringtone	2× Platinum	500,000^{*}
Japan (RIAJ) Full-length ringtone	3× Platinum	750,000^{*}
Japan (RIAJ) PC Download	Platinum	250,000^{^}
Japan (RIAJ) Digital single	Million	1,000,000^{*}
Streaming
Japan (RIAJ)	Gold	50,000,000^{†}
^{*} Sales figures based on certification alone.^{^} Shipments figures based on certification alone.^{†} Streaming-only figures based on certification alone.

== See also ==
- List of number-one digital singles of 2010 (Japan)
