= Girls' Generation (song) =

1989 song by Lee Seung-chul

Song by Lee Seung-chul

from the album Lee Seung-chul: Part 2
- Released: December 10, 1989
- Recorded: 1989
- Genre: K-pop
- Length: 4:38
- Label: Asia Records, WEA Korea
- Songwriters: Lee Seung-chul; Song Jae-joon
- Producer: Song Jae-joon

Girls' Generation (Korean: 소녀시대; RR: Sonyeo Sidae) is a South Korean song sung by several artists. The song was originally sung by Lee Seung-chul in 1989, released on his self-titled album Lee Seung-chul: Part 2.

It was covered by Maya in 2005 and girl group Girls' Generation in 2007, whose band name is derived from the song's. Gil Hak-mi also performed the song at Superstar K in 2009 and it was released on Love which contains songs by the first Superstar K Top 10.

== Background ==
"Girls' Generation" was included on Lee Seung-chul's second studio album, Lee Seung-chul: Part 2 (이승철 1집 Part 2), which was released on December 10, 1989.

== Girls' Generation version ==
"Girls' Generation"

Single by Girls' Generation

from the album Girls' Generation
- Released: November 1, 2007
- Recorded: 2007
- Genre: K-pop
- Length: 3:50
- Label: S.M. Entertainment
- Composers: Song Jae-joon; Kenzie (Note: Kenzie was credited to the remake for her contribution of the additional lyrics and composition.)
- Lyricists: Lee Seung-chul; Kenzie

Girls' Generation singles chronology
"Into the New World" (2007)	"Girls' Generation" (2007)	"Kissing You" (2008)

Music video
- "Girls' Generation" on YouTube

The remake of "Girls' Generation" was newly arranged by Kenzie. It was released on November 1, 2007, and served as the lead single for the group's debut album, Girls' Generation. The music video for "Girls' Generation" was released on November 1. To celebrate this cover, Lee Seung-chul appeared on M Countdown with the girls performing the song. The song was also used in episode 76 of You Are My Destiny, a drama series that starred Yoona.

=== Promotions ===
Girls' Generation held their comeback performance on M Countdown, on November 1, 2007. The group also performed the song on various music shows such as Music Bank, Show! Music Core and Inkigayo in November and December.

Music programs awards
Program	Date
Inkigayo	November 25, 2007
Inkigayo	December 2, 2007
M Countdown	December 6, 2007
M Countdown	December 20, 2007

=== Credits and personnel ===
Credits adapted from album's liner notes.

Studio

- SM Yellow Tail Studio – recording
- SM Concert Hall Studio – recording, mixing
- Sonic Korea – mastering

Personnel

- SM Entertainment – executive producer
- Lee Soo-man – producer
- Kim Young-min – executive supervisor
- Girls' Generation – vocals, background vocals
- Lee Seung-chul – lyrics
- Song Jae-joon – composition
- Kenzie – additional lyrics, additional composition, arrangement, vocal directing, recording
- Kim Jeong-bae – guitar
- Choi Won-hyuk – bass
- K String – strings
- Shim Sang-won – strings conducting, strings arrangement
- Lee Seong-ho – recording
- Nam Koong-jin – recording, mixing
- Jeon Hoon – mastering
