= Lee Seung-chul =

South Korean singer (born 1966)

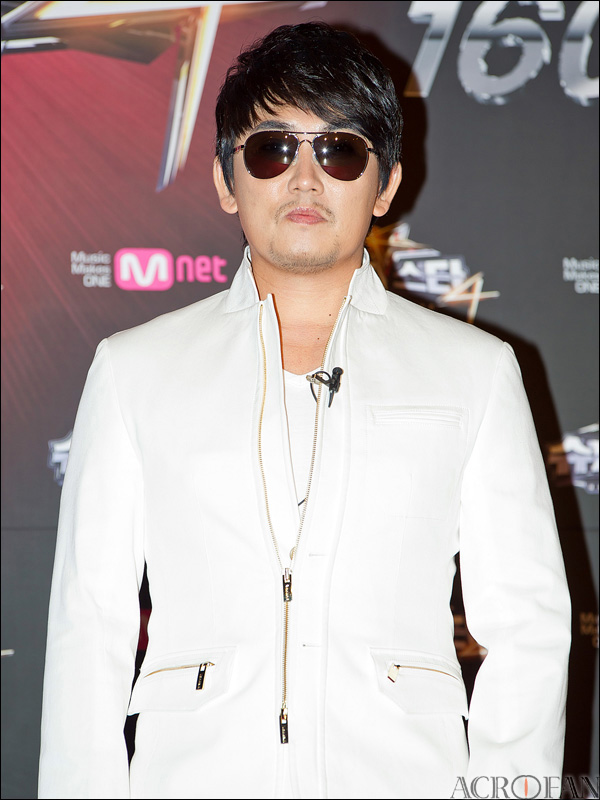
- Lee in 2012

Background information
- Also known as: Rui (in Japan)
- Born: December 5, 1966 (age 59); South Korea
- Genres: Soft rock; pop rock; Korean ballad
- Occupation: Singer
- Years active: 1985–present (Korea); 2006–present (Japan)
- Labels: MLD; Universal (A&M)

- Korean name
- Hangul: 이승철
- Hanja: 李承哲
- RR: I Seungcheol
- MR: I Sŭngch'ŏl

Lee Seung-chul (Korean: 이승철; born December 5, 1966) is a South Korean singer best known for the hit songs, "My Love", "Never Ending Story", and "Girls' Generation". Currently an artist of Kakao Entertainment's label Flex M, he debuted in 1985 as the vocalist of the rock band Boohwal, which he left in 1989 to release his first solo album, Don't Say Good-Bye. He has released 12 Korean studio albums in total. He is also active in Japan, where he is known by the stage name Rui.

Lee has won several major awards, including the Album Bonsang at the 1989, 2004, and 2009 Golden Disc Awards; and Musician of the Year (Male) at the 2005 Korean Music Awards.

== Discography ==
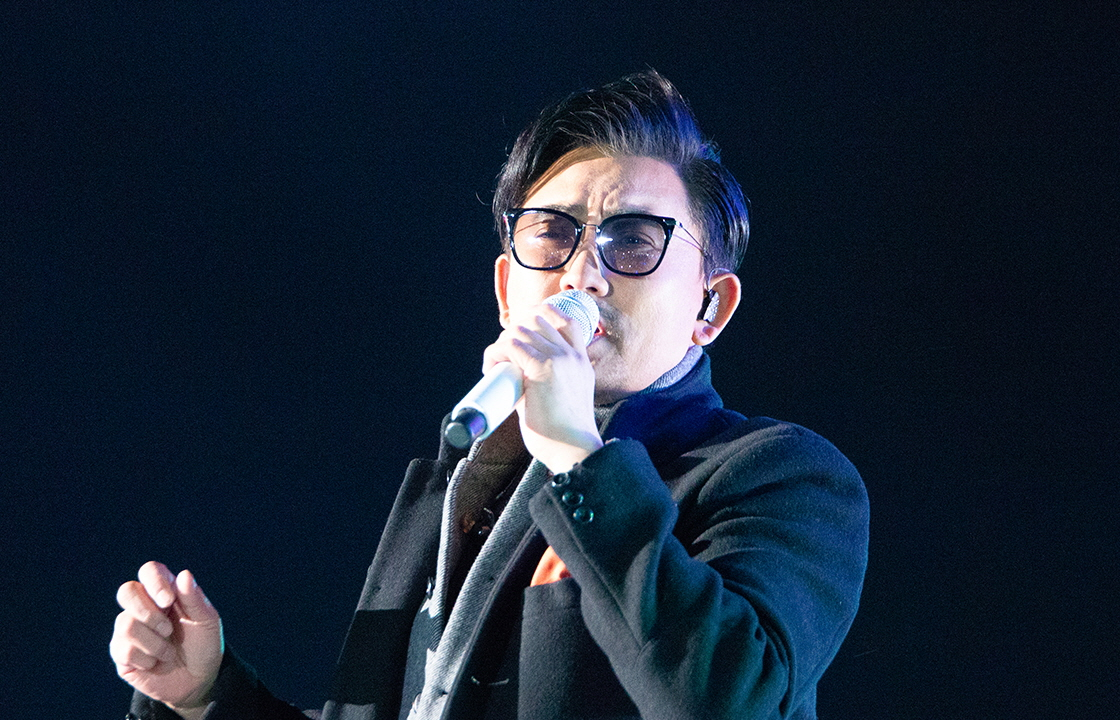
Lee performing in 2018

=== Studio albums ===
| Title | Album details | Peak chart positions | | Sales |
| Title | Album details | KOR | JPN | Sales |
Korean
| Don't Say Goodbye (안녕이라고 말하지마) (Part 1) | Released: July 1, 1989; Label: Asia Records; Track listing: 1. 안녕이라고 말하지마; 2. 마지막 나의 모습; 3. 잠도 오지 않는 밤에; 4. 희야; 5. 사랑하고 싶어; 6. 아무런 느낌도 받을 수 없어; 7. 낮잠자는 아이; 8. 떠나는 저녁; 9. 안녕이라고 말하지마 (Inst.); 10. 잠도 오지 않는 밤에 (Inst.) | —N/a | — | —N/a |
| Last Concert (마지막 콘서트) (Part 2) | Released: December 10, 1989; Label: Asia Records; Track listing: 1. 마지막 콘서트; 2. 소녀시대 (Girls' Generation); 3. 슬픈 사슴; 4. 떠나야 할땐; 5. 마지막 콘서트 (Inst.); 6. 비와 당신의 이야기; 7. 그녀는 새침떼기; 8. 회상; 9. 작은 창가; 10. 희야 | —N/a | — | —N/a |
| 노을, 그리고 나 / Ballerina-Girl (Glow, and me/Ballerina-Girl) | Released: September 1, 1990; Label: Asia Records; Track listing: 1. 노을 그리고 나 2. Irony!; 3. 그대가 나에게; 4. 실수 투성이; 5. 친구의 친구를 사랑했네; 6. Ballerina Girl; 7. 얼만큼?; 8. 외면; 9. 이 순간을 언제까지나; 10. 풍경화속의 거리; 11. Ballerina Girl II | —N/a | — | —N/a |
| The Wandering (방황) | Released: March 20, 1991; Label: Jigu Records; Track listing: 1. 방황; 2. 검은 고양이; 3. 나의 하루; 4. 방황 (Remix); 5. 넌 또다른 나 6. 추억이 같은 이별; 7. 가까이 와봐; 8. 후회 | —N/a | — | —N/a |
| The Secret of Color | Released: September 24, 1994; Label: Jigu Records; Track listing: 1. 색깔속의 비밀; 2. 겨울 그림; 3. 봄의 향기; 4. 웃는 듯 울어버린 나 5. 작은평화; 6. 착각; 7. 누구나 어른이 되서; 8. 사각의 시간; 9. 독신일기; 10. 소나기; 11. 흑백논리 | —N/a | — | —N/a |
| The Bridge of Sonic Heaven | Released: September 13, 1996; Label: Jigu Records; Track listing: 1. 오늘도 난 2. 비애; 3. 다시 날 그리워 할쯤엔; 4. 나 이제는; 5. 널 닮은 하늘에게; 6. 나의 하루; 7. 사실은; 8. 나의 고백 (故 유재하 음악제 대상곡); 9. 오늘도 난 (CLUB MIX) | —N/a | — | —N/a |
| 1999 | Released: March 11, 1999; Label: Cream Records; Track listing | 5 | — | KOR: 209,064 |
| The Live Long Day | Released: July 3, 2004; Label: Rui Entertainment; Track listing: 1. Intro; 2. 신의 질투; 3. 긴 하루; 4. 언덕위의 풍경; 5. 무정; 6. 나쁜 사람; 7. 니가 흘러내려; 8. Too Young to Love; 9. 처음 만난 날처럼; 10. 더 늦기전에; 11. I Will; 12. 그것만으로; 13. 나만의 세상 속에서; 14. 신의 질투 (Inst.); 15. 친구의 친구를 사랑했네 | 1 | — | KOR: 352,323 |
| Reflection of Sound | Released: September 27, 2006; Label: T Entertainment; Track listing: 1. 하얀새; 2. 소리쳐; 3. Annie; 4. 나를 믿어줘; 5. Wish; 6. 작은 기대; 7. 우리; 8. 시계; 9. 저.. 있잖아요; 10. 우린 사랑을 해요; 11. 떠나지마 | 4 | — | KOR: 91,047 |
| The Secret of Color 2 | Released: October 18, 2007; Label: T Entertainment; Track listing: 1. Part Time Lover; 2. 아무 말도; 3. 사랑한다; 4. Propose; 5. 눈물자욱; 6. 그날... 그 기억; 7. 더 사랑하니까; 8. 하고 싶은 말 9. 너의 하늘 | 9 | — | KOR: 34,092 |
| Mutopia: Land of Dreams | Released: May 7, 2009; Label: Jin & Won Music Works; Track listing: 1. 손톱이 빠져서; 2. In the Love; 3. 뒤돌아보면; 4. Reggae Night; 5. 너 때문에 눈물 흘린다; 6. 사랑아; 7. 얼마나 더 울어야해; 8. Love Is; 9. 넌 잊었는지; 10. My Girl; 11. 듣고있나요; 12. 그런 사람 또 없습니다; 13. Movin Star | 1 | — | |
| My Love | Released: June 18, 2013; Label: Jin & Won Music Works; Track listing: 1. 사랑하고 싶은 날 2. My Love; 3. 그런 말 말아요; 4. Run Way; 5. 늦장 부리고 싶어; 6. Rain Drops; 7. 40분 차를 타야해; 8. Beach Voice; 9. 손닿을 듯 먼 곳에; 10. 소원 | 2 | — | KOR: 53,704 |
| Time Goes Fast Like an Arrow (시간 참 빠르다) | Released: May 26, 2015; Label: Jin & Won Music Works; Track listing: 1. Intro; 2. 시련이 와도; 3. 마더; 4. 시간 참 빠르다; 5. 달링; 6. 비 오는 거리에서; 7. 사랑한다구요; 8. 한번 더 안녕; 9. 그리움만 쌓이네; 10. 사랑한다구요 (Acoustic Ver.); 11. 달링 (프로듀사 OST) | 5 | — | KOR: 16,074 |
| The Gold (Original Recording Remastered) | Released: June 28, 2016; Label: Shinchon Music; Track listing: 1. 풍경화 속의 거리; 2. 안녕이라고 말하지 마 3. 소녀시대; 4. 비와 당신의 이야기; 5. 희야; 6. 잠도 오지 않는 밤에; 7. 아무런 느낌도 받을 수 없어; 8. 마지막 콘서트; 9. 그대가 나에게; 10. 노을 그리고 나 11. IRONY; 12. 마지막 나의 모습; 13. 친구의 친구를 사랑했네; 14. 사랑하고 싶어; 15. 떠나야 할 땐 16. 외면 | — | — | |
Japanese
| For Japan | Released: March 22, 2006; Label: Universal/A&M; Track listing: 1. 因縁（「火の鳥」オリジナル・サウンドトラック）; 2. きみが流れ落ちる; 3. 10を数えてみる; 4. はじめて会った日のように; 5. 長い1日; 6. そのまま（「ローズマリー」オリジナル・サウンドトラック）; 7. Never Ending Story; 8. 永遠に; 9. 小さな平和; 10. 悲哀; 11. Too Young To Love; 12. I Will; 13. 想い出 | — | — | |
| Sound of Double | Released: April 26, 2006; Label: Universal/A&M; Track listing: 1. さよなら3; 2. たとえば; 3. Hee Ya; 4. 二重奏; 5. Too Young To Love; 6. Endless Letter~神の嫉妬; 7. 初雪~love Me In Your Heart~; 8. Close; 9. I Will; 10. Last Concert | — | 274 | |
"—" denotes album did not chart or was not released in that region.

=== Live albums ===
| Title | Album details | Peak chart positions | |
| Title | Album details | KOR | JPN |
Korean
| 이승철 라이브 (Lee Seung Chul Live) | Released: August 1, 1991; Label: K & C Music; Track listing: 1. 소녀시대; 2. 떠나야할땐; 3. 안녕이라 말하지마; 4. 그녀는 새침떼기; 5. 사랑하고 싶어; 6. 아무런 느낌 받을 수 없어; 7. 낮잠 자는 아이들; 8. Ballerina-Girl; 9. 그대가 나에게; 10. 마지막 Concert | —N/a | — |
| '91 Irony Live Lee Seung Chul | Released: June 4, 1992; Label: Dream on Music; Track listing: 1. 아이러니 + 소녀시대; 2. 그대가 나에게; 3. 외면; 4. 풍경화 속의 거리; 5. 희야; 6. 마지막 나의 모습; 7. 안녕이라고 말하지마; 8. 노을 그리고 나 9. 얼만큼; 10. 실수투성이; 11. 친구의 친구를 사랑했네; 12. 마지막 콘서트; 13. 이순간을 언제까지나; 14. 발레리나걸 | —N/a | — |
| Serious Live 93 | Released: January 1, 1993; Label: Earth Record; Track listing: 1. Include Video; 2. Good Eveing; 3. 비와 당신의 이야기; 4. 희야; 5. 이 순간을 언제까지나; 6. 슬픈 사슴; 7. 가까이 와봐; 8. 발레리나 걸 9. 방황; 10. 후회; 11. 추억이 같은 이별; 12. 넌 또다른 나 13. 검은 고양이; 14. 마지막 콘서트 | —N/a | — |
| 97 Heaven Live Hall in Sejong IV | Released: March 1, 1997; Label: Dream on Music; Track listing Disc 1: 1. 방황; 2. 희야; 3. 추억이 같은 이별; 4. 안녕이라고 말하지마; 5. 그대가 나에게; 6. 다시 날 그리워할쯤엔; 7. 잠도 오지 않는 밤에; 8. 마지막 콘서트; Disc 2: 1. 비애; 2. 이순간을 언제까지나; 3. 친구의 친구를 사랑했네; 4. 가까이 와봐; 5. 흑백논리; 6. 소녀시대; 7. 오늘도 난 8. 검은 고양이; 9. 나 이제는 | —N/a | — |
| 6집 1999 & Live Best (Vol. 6, 1999 & Live Best) | Released: March 21, 1999; Label: CJ E&M; Track listing Disc 1: 1. Prologue (서툰이별); 2. Hey! You; 3. 오직 너뿐인 나를...; 4. 이별의 무게; 5. 외면; 6. 사랑이란; 7. 애원; 8. 이름모를 소녀; 9. 그대 먼훗날에; 10. 오직 너뿐인 나를 (Dance Remix); Disc 2: 1. 검은 고양이 (Live); 2. 비애 (Live); 3. 그대가 나에게 (Live); 4. 가까이와봐 (Live); 5. 잠도 오지 않은 밤에 (Live); 6. 마지막 콘서트 (Live); 7. 친구의 친구를 사랑했네 (Live); 8. 오늘도 난 (Live); 9. 나 이제는 (Live); 10. 추억이 같은 이별 (Live); 11. 널 보낸 이유 (Live) | —N/a | — |
| Live Best | Released: October 27, 2005; Label: C&C Media; Track listing Disc 1: 1. Intro; 2. 너 뿐이야; 3. 비애; 4. 떠나야 할 땐 5. 안녕이라고 말하지마; 6. 사랑아닌 친구; 7. 그냥 그렇게; 8. 방황; 9. 마지막 콘서트; Disc 2: 1. 소녀시대; 2. 오늘도 난 3. Drum Solo; 4. 나 이제는; 5. 비와 당신의 이야기; 6. 이 순간을 언제까지나; 7. Never Ending Story; 8. Member Recommend; 9. 넌 또 다른 나 | —N/a | — |
| 20th Anniversary Live In 2005 | Released: November 3, 2005; Label: Cream Records; Track listing: 1. 마지막 콘서트; 2. 가까이 와봐; 3. 이 순간을 언제까지나; 4. 희야; 5. 긴 하루; 6. 안녕이라고 말하지마; 7. 방황; 8. 난 행복해; 9. 다 가기 전에; 10. 가로수 그늘 아래 서면; 11. 비처럼 음악처럼; 12. 인연; 13. 친구의 친구를 사랑했네; 14. 샴푸의 요정; 15. Never Ending Story | —N/a | — |
| Lee Seung Chul Live + Sound Of Double | Released: March 21, 2007; Label: T Entertainment; Track listing Disc 1: 1. 하얀새; 2. 소리쳐; 3. Annie; 4. 나를 믿어줘; 5. Wish; 6. 작은기대; 7. 우리; 8. 시계; 9. 저 있잖아요; 10. 우린 사랑을 해요; 11. 떠나지마; Disc 2: 1. 이 순간을 언제까지나; 2. 가까이 와봐; 3. 희야; 4. 긴 하루; 5. 안녕이라고 말하지마; 6. 방황; 7. 하얀새; 8. 잠도 오지않는 밤에; 9. 소리쳐 | —N/a | — |
| He's Coming | Released: July 23, 2008; Label: Cornerstone; Track listing: 1. Intro; 2. Oriental Canyon; 3. 희야; 4. 검은 고양이; 5. 안녕이라고 말하지마; 6. 잠도 오지 않는 밤에; 7. 이순간을 언제까지나; 8. 가까이 와봐; 9. 마지막 콘서트; 10. 긴 하루; 11. 방황; 12. 비와 당신의 이야기; 13. 친구의 친구를 사랑했네; 14. 샴푸의 요정; 15. Never Ending Story | —N/a | — |
| 2008: Lee Seung Chul Live - Moving Star | Released: 2008; Label: Track listing CD 1: 1. moving star 2. WELCOME TO TIMEMACHINE; 3. 방황; 4. 안녕이라고 말하지마; 5. 검은 고양이; 6. 잠도 오지 않는 밤에; 7. 가까이 와봐; 8. 마지막 콘서트; 9. 눈물자욱; 10. 긴 하루; CD 2: 1. 희야; 2. 인연; 3. DREAM FORWARD TO SUCH A DAY; 4. 하얀새; 5. PART TIME LOVE; 6. BAND SOLO; 7. BACK TO THE FUTURE; 8. 소녀시대; 9. 소리쳐 | —N/a | — |
| 이승철 25주년 기념 공연실황 DVD & Live 오케스트 락 (Lee Seung Chul's 25th Anniversary Live Performance DVD & Live Orchestra) | Released: May 31, 2011; Label: Jin & Won Music Works; Track listing: 1. Over Ture; 2. 안녕이라고 말하지마; 3. 방황; 4. Amore; 5. 사랑 참 어렵다; 6. 이순간을 언제까지나; 7. 마지막 콘서트; 8. 희야; 9. 인연; 10. 듣고 있나요; 11. 말리꽃; 12. 그런 사람 또 없습니다; 13. 손톱이 빠져서; 14. Band + Orchestra Solo; 15. Never Ending Story; 16. 소녀시대; 17. 소리쳐 | — | — |
| 이승철 골든 라이브 (95 Secret Live) (Lee Seung Chul Golden Live (95 Secret Live)) | Released: April 28, 2015; Label: Oasis record company; Track listing: 1. 이순간을 언제 까지나; 2. 그대가 나에게; 3. 가까이 와봐; 4. 안녕이라고 말하지마; 5. 색깔속의 비밀; 6. 마지막 콘서트; 7. 웃는듯 울어버린 나 8. 겨울 그림; 9. 작은 평화; 10. 흑백논리; 11. 소녀시대; 12. 방황; 13. 착각 | — | — |
| Lee Seung Chul: The Best Live (World Tour) | Released: May 3, 2016; Label: Jin & Won Music Works; Track listing: 1. MY LOVE; 2. 잊었니; 3. 사랑한다구요; 4. 인연; 5. 그 사람; 6. 그런 사람 또 없습니다; 7. 시간 참 빠르다; 8. 사랑하나봐; 9. 말리꽃; 10. 그날에; 11. Finale; 12. 일기장 | 15 | — |
"—" denotes album did not chart or was not released in that region.

=== Best albums ===
| Title | Album details | Peak chart positions | |
| Title | Album details | KOR | JPN |
Korean
| Hit Bank: The Best Of Song Festival | Released: May 1, 1992; Label: K & C Music; Track listing: 1. Ballerina-Girl I 2. 안녕이라고 말하지마; 3. 외면; 4. 회상 I 5. 떠나야 할땐; 6. Ballerina-Girl II; 7. 그대가 나에게; 8. 실수투성이; 9. 소녀시대; 10. 마지막 콘서트 | —N/a | — |
| Lee Seung Chul vs Park Kwang Hyun Vol.2 Best Of Best Panda Mix | Released: September 29, 1997; Re-released: February 18, 1999; Label: K & C Music; Track listing: 1. Intro; 2. 안녕이라고 말하지마 (Do not say goodbye); 3. 노을 그리고 나 (And I glow); 4. 풍경화속의 거리 (distance in the landscape); 5. 한송이 들국화처럼 (Like that one wild chrysanthemum); 6. 마지막 콘서트 (The last concert); 7. 그대가 나에게 (You are to me,); 8. 떠나야할 땐 (When I have to leave); 9. 비의 이별 (parting of non); 10. 마지막 나의 모습 (My last look); 11. 외면 (exterior); 12. 재회 (Reunion); 13. 비와 당신의 이야기 (Rain and your story); 14. 희야 (hee); 15. Irony; 16. 후회 (regrets); 17. 소녀시대 (Girls' Generation); 18. Outro | —N/a | — |
| King And King | Lee Seung-chul's and Park Sang-min's Best Album; Released: May 3, 2001; Label: Yedang Entertainment Company; Track listing Disc 1: 1. 하나의 사랑; 2. 무기여 잘 있거라; 3. 애원; 4. 미인박명; 5. 지중해; 6. 청바지 아가씨; 7. 비원; 8. 니 멋대로 살아라; 9. 너 떠난 뒤 10. 멀어져간 사람아; 11. I Love You; 12. 첫사랑; 13. 은하수; 14. 날 버린 나 15. 세상에 온 이유; Disc 2: 1. 마지막 콘서트; 2. 잠도 오지 않는 밤에; 3. 안녕이라고 말하지마; 4. 희야; 5. 소녀시대; 6. 그녀는 새침때기; 7. 회상; 8. 슬픈사슴; 9. 친구의 친구를 사랑했네; 10. 발레리나 걸 11. 그대가 나에게; 12. 사랑하고 싶어; 13. 실수투성이; 14. 마지막 나의 모습; 15. 떠나야 할때; 16. 외면 | —N/a | — |
| Best of Best: Forever Love | Released: December 1, 2003; Label: D Sound Cooperation; Track listing: 1. 안녕이라고 말하지마; 2. 희야; 3. 비와 당신의 이야기; 4. 사랑하고 싶어; 5. 마지막 나의 모습; 6. 노을 그리고 나 7. 다시 날 그리워 할쯤엔; 8. 오늘도 난 9. 소녀시대; 10. 발레리나 걸 1; 11. 아이러니; 12. 그대가 나에게; 13. 외면; 14. 슬픈 사슴; 15. 안녕이라고 말하지마 (Live); 16. 마지막 콘서트; 17. 오직 너뿐인 나를; 18. 친구의 친구를 사랑했네; 19. 회상; 20. 잠도 오지 않는 밤에; 21. 이순간은 언제나; 22. 발레리나 걸 2; 23. 실수 투성이; 24. 떠나야 할땐; 25. 낮잠자는 아이; 26. 얼만큼; 27. 그녀는 새침떼기; 28. 떠나는 저녁; 29. 작은 창가; 30. 마지막 콘서트 (Live) | —N/a | — |
| 20th Anniversary - A Walk To Remember | Released: June 9, 2005; Label: Aiins Digital Co., Ltd.; Track listing: 1. 기억 때문에; 2. 작은 연못; 3. 난 행복해; 4. 열을 세어 보아요 (Lotte Gas Boiler CF Lee Min-young); 5. 가로수 그늘 아래 서면; 6. 다 가기 전에; 7. 비 개인 오후; 8. 샴푸의 요정; 9. 비처럼 음악처럼; 10. 사람들은 모두 변하나봐; 11. 한계령; 12. 축복합니다 | —N/a | — |
| 이승철 베스트 (Lee Seung Chul Best) | Released: January 7, 2007; Label: C&D Media; Track listing Disc 1: 1. 희야; 2. 안녕이라고 말하지마; 3. 그대가 나에게; 4. 비와 당신의 이야기; 5. 사랑하고 싶어; 6. 마지막 나의 모습; 7. 노을 그리고 나 8. 발레리나 걸 I 9. 소녀시대; 10. 아이러니; 11. 외면; 12. 슬픈사슴; 13. 떠나야 할땐; 14. 아무런 느끼 받을 수 없어 (Live); 15. 안녕이라고 말하지마 (Live); Disc 2: 1. 친구의 친구를 사랑했네; 2. 잠도 오지 않는 밤에; 3. 마지막 콘서트; 4. 회상; 5. 이순간은 언제나; 6. 아무런 느낌도; 7. 낮잠 자는 아이; 8. 작은창가; 9. 풍경 속의 거리; 10. 발레리나 걸 II; 11. 실수토성이; 12. 얼만큼; 13. 그녀는 새침떼기; 14. 떠나는 저녁; 15. 마지막 콘서트 (Live) | —N/a | — |
| Golden Ballads & Special Live Best | Released: May 1, 2010; Label: RIAK; Track listing Disc 1: 1. 안녕이라고 말하지마; 2. 친구의 친구를 사랑했네; 3. 비와 당신의 이야기; 4. 회상; 5. 그대가 나에게; 6. 사랑하고 싶어; 7. 희야; 8. 얼만큼; 9. 잠도 오지 않는 밤에; 10. 노을 그리고 나 11. 마지막 나의 모습; 12. 슬픈사슴; 13. 풍경화속의 거리; 14. 외면; 15. 떠나는 저녁; Disc 2: 1. 마지막 콘서트; 2. 그대가 나에게; 3. 소녀시대; 4. 안녕이라고 말하지마; 5. 사랑하고 싶어; 6. 발레리나 걸 7. 아무런 느낌 받을 수 없어; 8. 그녀는 새침떼기; 9. 낮잠자는 아이들; 10. 떠나야 할땐; 11. 작은창가; 12. 마지막 콘서트 (Inst.); 13. 안녕이라고 말하지마 (Inst.) | — | — |
Japanese
| Rui:The Best Great Hits | Released: March 24, 2006; Label: Yedang Entertainment Company; Track listing: 1. 因縁 (「火の鳥」オリジナル・サウンドトラック) ("Phoenix" OST); 2. きみが流れ落ちる; 3. 10を数えてみる; 4. はじめて会った日のように; 5. 長い1日; 6. そのまま (「ローズマリー」オリジナル・サウンドトラック) ("Rosemary" OST); 7. Never Ending Story; 8. 永遠に; 9. 小さな平和; 10. 悲哀; 11. Too Young To Love; 12. I Will; 13. 想い出 | —N/a | — |
"—" denotes album did not chart or was not released in that region.

=== Other albums ===
| Title | Album details | Peak chart positions | | Sales |
| Title | Album details | KOR | JPN | Sales |
Korean
| Lee Seung Chul vs Park Kwang Hyun - Best Of Best Remix | Released: December 27, 2011; Label: Shinchon R&B Music; Track listing: 1. INTRO; 2. 안녕이라고 말하지 마 3. 노을 그리고 나 4. 풍경화 속의 거리; 5. 한 송이 저 들국화처럼; 6. 마지막 콘서트; 7. 그대가 나에게; 8. 떠나야 할 땐 9. 비의 이별; 10. 마지막 나의 모습; 11. 외면; 12. 재회; 13. 비와 당신의 이야기; 14. 희야; 15. Irony; 16. 후회; 17. 소녀시대; 18. OUTRO | —N/a | — | |
| Boohwal & Lee Seung Chul Joint Concert at Hilton Hotel Part 1 | Re-released: D95; Re-released: January 1997; Label: DoReMi Records; Track listing: 1. 소나기; 2. 회상 II; 3. 흑백영화; 4. 별 (Instrument); 5. Member 소개; 6. 기억상실; 7. 흐린비가 내리며는; 8. 사랑할수록; 9. 천국에서; 10. 지나온 날들에게; 11. 마지막 콘서트 | —N/a | — | |
| Boohwal & Lee Seung Chul Joint Concert at Hilton Hotel Part 2 | Released: April 1995; Label: DoReMi Records; Track listing: 1. 천국에서; 2. 지나온 날들에게; 3. 소녀시대; 4. 희야; 5. 안녕이라고 말하지마; 6. 가까이 와봐; 7. 그대가 나에게; 8. 발레리나 걸 9. YOU'RE SO BEAUTIFUL; 10. 방황; 11. 검은고양이; 12. 마지막 콘서트 | —N/a | — | |
| Deep Blue | Total Remake Album; Released: April 1, 1998; Label: Hansol; Track listing: 1. The Poison (검은고양이 II) (Euro Mix); 2. 비애 (Blues Mix); 3. 널 보낸 이유 (New Version); 4. 친구의 친구를 사랑했네 (Club Mix); 5. 마지막 콘서트 (Classical Swing Mix); 6. 아름다운 날에는 (Ner Version); 7. 노을 그리고 나 (Morden Pop Mix); 8. 소녀시대 (Hip Hop Mix); 9. 안녕이라고 말하지마 (Jazz Groove Mix); 10. 하늘이 준 우연 (New Version); 11. 가까이 와봐 (Progressive Mix) | —N/a | — | |
| Confession | Album with new songs, remakes and hits from the past.; Released: March 21, 2001; Label: CJ E&M; Track listing Disc 1: 1. 우리 영원토록; 2. 니가 흘러내려; 3. 고백; 4. 빈터; 5. 안녕; 6. 아름다운 나라; 7. 그냥 그렇게; 8. 가까이 하기에 너무 먼 당신; 9. 겨울바다; Disc 2: 1. 소녀시대; 2. 친구의 친구를 사랑했네; 3. 방황; 4. 외면; 5. 오늘도 난 6. 나 이제는; 7. 이 순간을 언제까지나; 8. 말리꽃 | —N/a | — | |
| No.1 (2008 Original Recording Remastered) | Unreleased songs from 90s remastered.; Released: October 8, 2008; Label: Shinchon R&B Music; Track listing: 1. 풍경화속의 거리; 2. 안녕이라고 말하지마; 3. 친구의 친구를 사랑했네; 4. 마지막 나의 모습; 5. 사랑하고 싶어; 6. 아무런 느낌도 받을 수 없어; 7. 그대가 나에게; 8. 소녀시대; 9. 잠도 오지 않는 밤에; 10. 실수투성이; 11. 비와 당신의 이야기; 12. 외면; 13. 마지막 콘서트; 14. 노을 그리고 나 15. 떠나야 할 땐 | —N/a | — | |
| 사랑 참 어렵다 (이승철 10th 리패키지) (Love is so hard (Lee Seung Chul 10th Repackage)) | Repackage album; Released: September 4, 2009; Label: Windmill ENT; Track listing: 1. 사랑 참 어렵다; 2. 손톱이 빠져서; 3. In The Love; 4. 뒤돌아보면; 5. Reggae Night; 6. 너 때문에 눈물 흘린다; 7. 사랑아; 8. 얼마나 더 울어야해; 9. Love Is; 10. 넌 잊었는지; 11. My Girl; 12. 듣고있나요; 13. 그런 사람 또 없습니다; 14. Moving Star | 27 | — | KOR: 2,533 |
| 이승철 25주년 기념 앨범 (Lee Seung Chul 25th Anniversary Album) | Remake album; Released: May 4, 2010; Label: Stone Music Entertainment; Track listing: 1. 25번째 프로포즈 (Feat. Tiger JK) (remake); 2. 너에게 물들어간다; 3. 그때로 돌아가자; 4. 소녀시대 (Vocal Girls' Generation) (remake); 5. 희야 (Feat. Henry) (Vocal Kim Tae-woo) (remake); 6. 안녕이라고 말하지마 (Vocal JYP) (remake); 7. 긴 하루 (With Ivy) (remake); 8. 떠나지마 (Vocal Kim Bum-soo) (remake); 9. 마지막 콘서트 (Inst.); 10. 방황 (Vocal Hwangje Baendeu, Henry) (remake) | 1 | — | |
| All That Masterpiece/Lee Seung Chul - Part 1 + 2 | The first 2 albums remastered box; Released: February 22, 2012; Label: JTL Music; Track listing Disc 1: 1. 안녕이라고 말하지마; 2. 사랑하고 싶어; 3. 마지막 나의 모습; 4. 아무런 느낌도 받을 수 없어; 5. 안녕이라고 말하지마 (연주곡); 6. 잠도 오지 않는 밤에; 7. 낮잠자는 아이; 8. 떠나는 저녁; 9. 희 야 10. 잠도 오지 않는 밤에 (연주곡); Disc 2: 1. 마지막 콘서트; 2. 소녀시대; 3. 슬픈사슴; 4. 떠나야 할 땐 5. 마지막 콘서트 (연주곡); 6. 비와 당신의 이야기; 7. 그녀는 새침떼기; 8. 회 상 I 9. 작은 창가; 10. 희야 | — | — | |
"—" denotes album did not chart or was not released in that region.

=== Video albums ===
| Title | Album details |
|---|---|
| Lee Sung Chul with Boo-Hwal | Released: May 2, 2003; Label: Spectrum DVD; Track listing: 1. Intro; 2. 새벽; 3. 너뿐이야; 4. 슬픈 사슴; 5. 회상 I 6. 사랑아닌 친구; 7. Jill's Theme; 8. 회상 II; 9. 안녕이라고 말하지마; 10. Never Ending Story; 11. 희야; 12. 마지막 콘서트; 13. 소녀시대; 14. 오늘도 난 15. 비와 당신의 이야기; 16. 사랑할수록; Special Features: 1. Interview (인터뷰); 2. @Studio (스튜디오 현장모습); 3. Unplugged 'Never Ending Story'; 4. Rehearsal; 5. Gallery (사진모음); 6. '무시로'; 7. Music Video: 'Never Ending Story'(뮤직비디오) |
| 이승철 25주년 기념 공연실황 DVD & Live 오케스트 락 (Lee Seung Chul's 25th Anniversary Live Performance DVD & Live Orchestra) | Released: February 8, 2011; Label: Jin & Won Music; Track listing: 1. OVER TURE; 2. 안녕이라고 말하지마; 3. 방황; 4. 검은 고양이; 5. Amore; 6. 사랑 참 어렵다; 7. 이순간을 언제까지나; 8. 가까이 와봐; 9. 마지막 콘서트; 10. 희야; 11. Nocturn (Music by Shopin); 12. 인연; 13. 듣고 있나요.; 14. 말리꽃; 15. Harp Interlude; 16. 그런 사람 또 없습니다.; 17. 손톱이 빠져서; 18. Band + Orchestra Solo; 19. 비와 당신의 이야기; 20. 친구의 친구를 사랑했네+샴푸의 요정; 21. Never Ending Story; 22. March Of Victory; 23. 소녀시대; 24. 소리쳐; 25. Finale |
| Lee Seung Chul - 30 Years Anniversary | Released: October 10, 2016; Label: Stone Music Entertainment (CJ E&M); Track listing: 1. INTRO; 2. My Love; 3. 안녕이라고 말 하지마; 4. 잊었니; 5. 마지막 콘서트; 6. 무정; 7. 사랑한다구요; 8. 가까이 와 봐 9. 인연; 10. 그 사람; 11. 손톱이 빠져서; 12. 방황; 13. 일기장; 14. 이 순간을 언제까지나; 15. 그런 사람 또 없습니다; 16. 희야; 17. 소녀시대; 18. Never Ending Story; 19. 말리꽃; 20. 그날에; 21. Finale |

== Filmography ==
=== Film ===
| Year | Title | Role | Note |
|---|---|---|---|
| 1992 | The Moon Is... the Sun's Dream | Mu-hoon | leading role |
| 2009 | More than Blue | singer A | cameo |

=== Television shows ===
| Year | Title | Role | Notes/Ref. |
|---|---|---|---|
| 2019-2020 | Stars' Top Recipe at Fun-Staurant | himself | judge |
| 2021 | My Name is Caddy | Host | |
| 2022 | Groom's Class | Cast Member | |

== Awards and nominations ==
| Award ceremony | Year | Category | Nominee / work | Result | Ref. |
|---|---|---|---|---|---|
| Golden Disc Awards | 1989 | Album Bonsang (Main Prize) | Don't Say Goodbye | Won | |
| Golden Disc Awards | 2004 | Album Bonsang (Main Prize) | The Live Long Day | Won | |
| Golden Disc Awards | 2009 | Album Bonsang (Main Prize) | Mutopia: Land of Dreams | Won | |
| Korean Music Awards | 2005 | Musician of the Year (Male) | Lee Seung-chul | Won | |
| Mnet Asian Music Awards | 2004 | Best Ballad Video | "The Livelong Day" (긴 하루) | Nominated | |
| Mnet Asian Music Awards | 2004 | Best OST | "Fate" (Phoenix) | Nominated | |
| Mnet Asian Music Awards | 2006 | Best Male Artist | "Scream" | Nominated | |
| Mnet Asian Music Awards | 2006 | Best Ballad Video | "The Livelong Day" (긴 하루) | Nominated | |
| Mnet Asian Music Awards | 2009 | Best Male Solo Artist | "Broken Fingernails" | Nominated | |
| Mnet Asian Music Awards | 2009 | Best OST | "No More Love Like This" (Blue Love Story) | Nominated | |
| Mnet Asian Music Awards | 2013 | Best Male Artist | "My Love" | Nominated | |
| Mnet Asian Music Awards | 2013 | Best Music Video | "My Love" | Nominated | |
| Mnet Asian Music Awards | 2013 | Best Vocal Performance - Male | "My Love" | Nominated | |
| Mnet Asian Music Awards | 2013 | Best Concert Performer | Lee Seung-chul | Won | |
