= Baby Baby (Girls' Generation song) =

Single by Girls' Generation

from the album Baby Baby
- Released: March 17, 2008
- Recorded: 2007
- Genre: K-pop; teen-pop; bubblegum pop
- Length: 3:11
- Label: SM
- Composer: Hwang Sung-jae
- Lyricists: Hwang Sung-jae; Jenny Yoo

Girls' Generation singles chronology
"Kissing You" (2008)	"Baby Baby" (2008)	"Gee" (2009)

Music video
- "Baby Baby" on YouTube

"Baby Baby" is a song by South Korean girl group Girls' Generation, released on March 17, 2008, through SM Entertainment as the lead single off of the repackaged edition of their debut studio album Girls' Generation, also titled Baby Baby.

== Background and release ==
It was the lead single of the repackage of Girls' Generation, titled Baby Baby who was released on March 17, 2008. The album was released in two versions, each edition features the same contents, however the cover art used for one of them was used as back cover for the other one, and the other way around. A MV for "Baby Baby" was released as well, containing scenes of the Making of video of the Girls' Generation MV, and footage of the girls working on their first album.

The song was produced by Hwang Sung-jae (BJJ), who also co-wrote with Jenny Yoo.

== Music video and promotion ==
The music video for "Baby Baby" was released on March 17. The Music Video consists of behind the scene footage from other music videos.

Girls' Generation had their comeback performance on Music Bank, on March 21, 2008. The group also performed "Baby Baby" on various music shows such as Music Core, Inkigayo and M! Countdown in March and April. The album promotions was concluded on April 13, 2008, at Inkigayo.

== Awards and nominations ==
Music programs awards
Program	Date
M Countdown	April 10, 2008
Show! Music Core	April 12, 2008

== Credits and personnel ==
Credits adapted from album's liner notes.

Studio

- SM Blue Ocean Studio – recording
- SM Concert Hall Studio – recording, strings recording, mixing
- T_BJJ Studio – recording
- Sonic Korea – mastering

Personnel

- SM Entertainment – executive producer
- Lee Soo-man – producer
- Kim Young-min – executive supervisor
- Girls' Generation – vocals, background vocals
- Jenny Yoo – lyrics
- Hwang Sung-jae – lyrics, composition, arrangement, keyboards, piano, recording
- Lee Ju-hyung – vocal directing, line makeup, Pro Tools editor, recording
- Kim Bo-ah – background vocals
- Lee Seong-ryeol – guitar
- Shin Hyun-kwon – bass
- Yoo Ji-sang a.k.a. G-High – keyboards, piano, rhythm programming, sound effect, recording
- K String – strings
- Nile Lee – strings conducting, strings arrangement
- Heo Jeong-hee a.k.a. KAT – recording
- Nam Koong-jin – recording, strings recording, mixing
- Jeon Hoon – mastering
