= Genie (Girls' Generation song) =

Single by Girls' Generation

- Japanese single cover

Single by Girls' Generation

from the EP Genie and the album Girls' Generation
- Released: June 22, 2009; September 8, 2010 (Japan)
- Studio: SM Studios (Seoul)
- Genre: Electropop; dance-pop; bubblegum pop
- Length: 3:52
- Label: SM; Nayutawave Records
- Composers: Anne Judith Wik; Robin Jenssen; Ronny Svendsen; Nermin Harambašić; Fridolin Nordsø; Yoo Young-jin
- Lyricists: Yoo Young-jin; Kanata Nakamura (JP)
- Producer: Yoo Young-jin

Girls' Generation singles chronology
"Gee" (2009)	"Genie" (2009)	"Oh!" (2010)

Japanese singles chronology
"Run Devil Run" (2010)	"Genie" (2010)	"Gee" (2010)

Music video
- "Genie" on YouTube

"Genie" (Korean: 소원을 말해봐; RR: Sowoneul malhaebwa; lit. 'Tell Me Your Wish') is a song recorded by South Korean girl group Girls' Generation for their second extended play (EP) of the same name (2009), released on June 22, 2009. Written and composed by Dsign Music, Fridolin Nordsø and produced by Yoo Young-jin, the song is the group's first collaboration with Western composers and producers.

Musically, "Genie" carried on the group's phase of bubblegum pop music from their debut. Lyrically, the song discusses the elements of love and relationships, alongside granting the wishes of their partner. It received generally positive reviews from music critics, many of whom highlighted the track as one of the highlights on the EP. The single was well received domestically, achieving the top spots on music programs Inkigayo and Music Bank.

A Japanese-language version of the song was recorded for the group's eponymous Japanese debut album and was released as their debut single in Japan on September 8, 2010. It was a commercial success in the country, peaking at number four on the Oricon Singles Chart and number eight on the RIAJ Digital Track Chart. The single received certifications by the Recording Industry Association of Japan on three platforms—physical sales (gold), digital sales (platinum), and chaku-uta (platinum). The song was included on the setlists of Girls' Generation's several concert tours, including Into the New World (2010), The First Japan Arena Tour (2011), and Girls' Generation Tour (2011).

== Background and composition ==
"Genie" – Girls' Generation
"Genie" is a bubblegum pop song, akin to the group's early releases.

"Genie" was composed by Norwegian production team Dsign Music members Anne Judith Wik, Robin Jenssen, Ronny Svendsen, and Nermin Harambašić, alongside Fridolin Nordsø and Yoo Young-jin. The Korean lyrics was written by Yoo Young-jin, while the Japanese lyrics was written by Kanata Nakamura. Dsign Music had originally composed the song for Congolese-Dutch singer Nathalie Makoma, however, SM Entertainment bought the rights to the original demo composition and rewrote and re-arranged it for the Korean market, and it was eventually given to Girls' Generation. Makoma eventually released the original song as a single on June 18, 2010 under Sony Music.

The song was originally composed in English as "I Just Wanna Dance". Both versions were the groups' first singles to be composed and produced by Western producers, and had continued with future musical releases. Musically, both versions carried on the groups phase of bubblegum pop music since their debut in 2007.

According to Chucky Eddy from Spin, he found that the composition was inspired by "super-light-footed Italo disco..." A staff reviewer from CD Journal noticed musical elements of electropop and said the lyrics incorporates metaphorical uses of a lamp, genie, and Aladdin as themes of love and lust. Critic Lee Mun-won says that the song employs inspirations from trance and writes that the song itself is "more sophisticated than authentic europop."

== Release ==
"Genie" was released digitally on June 22, 2009, in South Korea. In Japan, the song was released on September 8, 2010, as the group's debut Japanese single. The Japanese Maxi CD and DVD format of the single contains the Japanese version, the Korean version, and the karaoke version of the former. A limited edition CD and DVD format was released in both Japan and Taiwan; it featured a 14-paged booklet of photos, lyrics, and credits to the single, the original Japanese Maxi CD and DVD tracks, all housed in a digipak. The cover sleeve for both formats features Girls' Generation in different black and gold dresses, all standing in front of a white backdrop.

== Reception ==
"Genie" received generally positive reviews from music critics. Chucky Eddy from Spin highlighted "Genie" as one of the best tracks from their self-titled album. A staff reviewer from CD Journal reviewed the group's debut greatest hits album The Best. The reviewer commended the track by labelling it an "impressive 'lets dance'" track with "high quality" vocal performances by each member. Another reviewer from the same publication reviewed the single's release, and labelled it "sophisticated". Chris True from AllMusic reviewed the groups biography, and selected "Genie" as one of the best tracks throughout their career. Billboard ranked the song as the best single in their career.

Commercially, the song peaked at number four on the weekly Oricon Singles Chart in Japan. The single sold 115,575 physical copies by the end of 2010 and was ranked the 58th best-selling single of the year. It was selected by iTunes Japan as the "breakthrough pop album of the year".

== Music video ==
Rino Nakasone Razalan choreographed the dance in all the videos. Like the album, the girls were given a "military" concept for their performance of "Genie", dressing mostly in tight military jackets, miniskirts, and/or hot pants. The colours were mostly white navy shirts, khaki brown, and red, although various uniforms were shown. The group wished to show a mature image, in comparison to the innocence portrayed during "Gee". Much of the choreography was focused on synchronization and seductive images; parts of it became popular in Korea, including the "Jegi-kicking dance" (제기차기 춤) and the "Leg-beauty dance" (각선미 춤).

=== Original video ===
The teaser video was released on June 19, 2009. Later, the original video was released on June 26, 2009. In this version, Yoona appears first sitting in a large lamp, the other members sitting around her. The music video cuts back and forth between the group performing the choreography and scenes from three separate rooms occupied by three different members each. Yoona, Yuri and Jessica are in a large pink bedroom, Tiffany, Taeyeon and Sunny are in a disco bar, while Sooyoung and Hyoyeon are in a room with a large cake from which Seohyun then pops out.

Two runway-like stages were used, one with a large heart in the background and the other featuring the words "GIRLS' GENIE" in the background; the girls wear white uniforms consisting of marine hats, coats, short-shorts, and heels on the former, while they don khaki uniforms in the latter. The music video frequently shows the girls interacting with the camera and with arms that sometimes extend from either side of the screen to give the impression that the girls are interacting with the viewer personally whereas stage sequences have heavy, flashy lights and moving spotlights to give strong and bright effects. The music video was uploaded on SMTOWN's YouTube channel on February 26, 2010.

=== 3D version ===
On October 24, 2010, a 3D music video of the Korean version, was released for Samsung PAVV LED TV. The video begins with all nine girls sitting down, looking into crystal balls, then cutting into the beginning of the song with "Girls Generation" written in pink, sparkly lettering. The video features three dance sequences, one of which features a floor with cosmic-like sparkles coming out of it. During the video, it cuts to solo scenes of the girls playing with the crystal balls, inside are a man and a woman standing awkwardly beside each other at a bus stop, beside them is a poster with "I Wish" printed on it, and a red Mini Convertible is below it. The girls are then seen changing the couples clothes, and making the Mini appear out of the poster, signifying the girls are 'genies' and granting their wishes. The video ends with the girls waving goodbye to the couple, who then drive off in the car, with the number '37' printed on the side. Like the original video, the "marine girl" concept is used, with the reuse of the white uniforms and the navy blue uniforms replacing the khakis.

=== Japanese version ===
The music video teaser was released August 16, 2010, and the full music video was released August 25, 2010, it was also their first video to be filmed in Japan. It begins with a young boy (Exo's Chanyeol) who found an old lamp and a scale model of a circus tent in an old attic. After rubbing the lamp, the camera zooms inside the tent where the Girls' Generation can be seen coming to life as the song begins to play. The girls then alternately switch to different costumes as the boy rubs the lamp once again, where in they are seen on an old television screen with a huge candy cane and colorful balloons. The music video ends with the boy rubbing the lamp again before magically disappearing into another scene where he is walking out of a limousine with Girls' Generation members meeting him on the red carpet at a premiere event. It is implied that his wish had been granted by lamp.

== Live performances ==
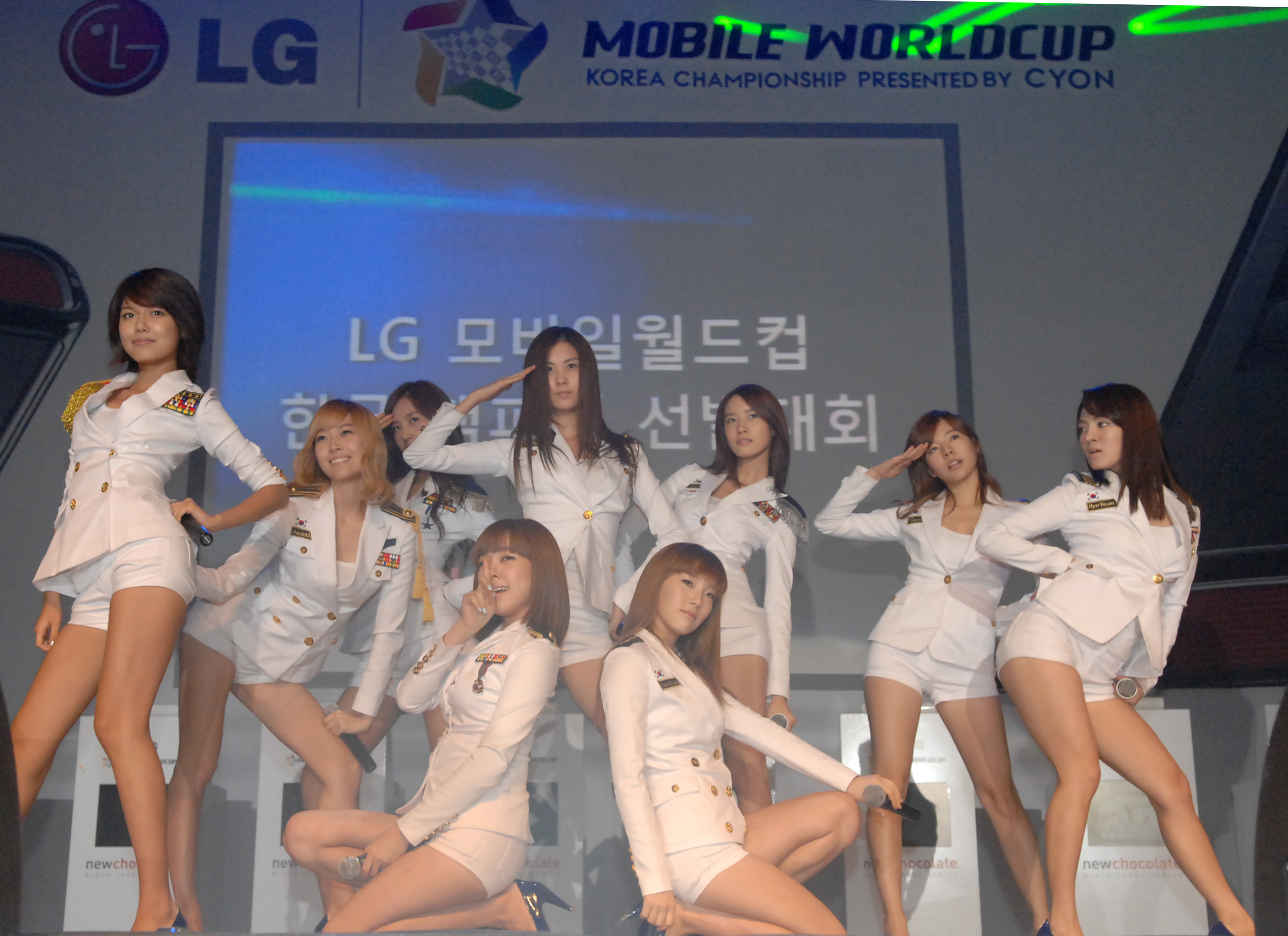
Girls' Generation performing "Genie" in November 2009

The song has been performed on two SM Town tours, In 2010, using the "Rock Tronic" remix, which was also used on their first tour, and then again in 2011 for the continuation of the 2010 SMTown tour. The remix contains a rock inspired dance-break, where the girls perform in-sync routines. The group's first performance for the mini-album was on June 26 on Music Bank. Within a few days, the song topped on 10 different digital music charts. The song also topped the weekly ringtone downloads chart.

"Genie" was featured as the opening number for the Girls' first Japan tour, and on the 2nd Asia tour. The performance begins with the girls appearing from an odd-shaped cocoon-like prop, where they are assembled in the shape of a pyramid.

== Other versions and plagiarism issues ==
Issues of plagiarism were caused by Uzbek singer Dineyra's song "Raqsga Tushgin." It was revealed that although the release of her song preceded the release of Girls' Generation's second mini-album, the Uzbekistan singer's song was recorded without obtaining proper permission from Universal Music, thus plagiarizing "Genie". On June 3, 2011, British singer C.J. Lewis released an English version of "Genie".

By popular demand, developer Riot Games created an official equivalent based on it, Popstar Ahri, which was released worldwide on November 25, 2013, and has the dance from "Genie" as the dance emote.

== Awards ==
Awards and nominations for "Genie"
Year	Organization	Award	Result	Ref.
2009	Melon Music Awards	Song of the Year	Nominated	
2010	Korean Music Awards	Best Pop Song	Nominated	
2011	MTV Video Music Awards Japan	Video of the Year	Nominated	
2011	MTV Video Music Awards Japan	Best Group Video	Won	
2011	MTV Video Music Awards Japan	Best Karaoke Song	Won	
2011	Space Shower Music Awards	Best Pop Music Video	Won	

Music program awards
Program	Date	Ref.
Music Bank	July 10, 2009	
Inkigayo	July 12, 2009	
Inkigayo	July 19, 2009	

== Track listing ==
CD single – Japanese version

1. "Genie" (Japanese version) – 3:44
2. "Genie" (Korean version) – 3:49
3. "Genie" (Without main vocal) – 3:44

DVD – Japanese version

1. "Genie" (Music video)
2. "Genie" (Music video – Dance version) (First Press only)

== Credits and personnel ==
Credits are adapted from Korean album and Japanese CD single liner notes.

Studio

- Recorded and mixed at SM Booming System
- Mastered at Sonic Korea

Personnel

- SM Entertainment – executive producer
- Girls' Generation – vocals, background vocals
- Yoo Young-jin – producer, Korean lyrics, composition, mixing, recording, vocal directing, background vocals, synthesizer, programming
- Kanata Nakamura – Japanese lyrics
- Yoo Han-jin – arrangement, background vocals
- Shigeki Fujino – Japanese mastering
- Nermin Harambašić – composition
- Fridolin Nordsø – composition
- Anne Judith Wik – composition
- Robin Jenssen – composition
- Ronny Svendsen – composition
- Kim Hyun-ah – background vocals
- Jeon Hoon – Korean mastering

== Charts ==
=== Weekly charts ===
Chart (2010–11)	Peak position
Japan (Japan Hot 100)	4
Japan (RIAJ Digital Track Chart)	8
Japan (Oricon)	4
South Korean Albums (Gaon) (Note: "Genie" was released in South Korea in 2009, therefore it failed to enter the Gaon Singles Chart, which launched in 2010. Nonetheless, the Japanese version of the song entered the Gaon Album Chart at number two in 2011.)	2

=== Year-end charts ===
Chart (2010)	Position
Japan (Oricon)	58
Japan (RIAJ Digital Track Chart)	78

Chart (2011)	Position
South Korean International Albums (Gaon)	7

== Certifications ==
Region	Certification	Certified units/sales
Japan (RIAJ) physical single	Gold	151,042
Japan (RIAJ) PC download	Platinum	250,000^{*}
Japan (RIAJ) Full-length ringtone	Platinum	250,000^{*}
^{*} Sales figures based on certification alone.
