= Genie (EP) =

- Revised cover

EP by Girls' Generation
- Released: June 29, 2009
- Recorded: February–June 2009
- Length: 21:52
- Language: Korean
- Labels: SM; Dreamus
- Producers: Dsign Music; Yoo Young-jin; Kenzie

Girls' Generation chronology
| Gee (2009) | Genie (2009) | Oh! (2010) |

Singles from Genie
- 1. "Genie" Released: June 22, 2009

Genie (소원을 말해봐 (Genie); Sowoneul Malhaebwa (Genie); lit. 'Tell Me Your Wish (Genie)') is the second extended play by South Korean girl group Girls' Generation. The EP was released on June 29, 2009, by SM Entertainment. Composers Dsign Music, Yoo Young-jin, Kenzie, Hwang Seong-je and Kim Jin-hwan joined the production of the EP. Girls’ Generation started their official promotions on Music Bank, on June 26, 2009, ending their promotions on August 15.

== Background and release ==
In late June, SM Entertainment announced that Girls' Generation would be making a comeback with a new single and showing a "Marine Girl" concept; "Genie" was then released digitally on June 22, 2009. The group's first performance for the album was on June 26 on KBS Music Bank. The song topped single and ringtone charts. The EP was released on June 29, 2009. Their first win for their single "Genie" was obtained at the July 10, 2009, episode of KBS Music Bank. Their second award was claimed at the July 12, 2009, episode of SBS Inkigayo. The group finished promotions for "Genie" in August 2009. The music video was released a little later and features the group members dancing in Navy uniforms.

== Composition ==
This album contains a total of six songs including the lead single of the same title. The only single off the album, "Genie", is an electronica-style pop song influenced by the European dance genre, featuring a heavily synthesized intro. The song was originally composed in English by Dsign Music as "I Just Wanna Dance" originally written for the US Idol Jennifer Sparks. Later the lyrics was adapted to Korean by Yoo Young-jin. The lyrics' theme is exposed by the subtitle "Genie", which is the metaphorical symbol of "Goddesses of Luck" (Korean: 행운의 여신). "Girlfriend" is a 1980s disco-style song while "Boyfriend" is a dance-pop song, bringing electro elements. "My Child" is with a piano-played intro in a gospel and classical style. "One Year Later" is a soft pop ballad duet sung by Jessica and Onew of Shinee. The duet was also featured in MBC TV drama Pasta.

== Commercial performance ==
The album sold an estimated 50,000 copies in its first week after release (almost double the first-week sales of Gee), an unusual feat for any Korean girl group.

== Controversy ==
The physical release of Genie was originally slated for June 25, 2009, but was delayed by SM Entertainment in order to redo the album art. Notable changes included correcting a plummeting plane used as an apostrophe into making it fly upward, the removal of both a World War II Imperial Japanese A6M Zero fighter, and the revision of a slightly modified eagle insignia of the Nazi Party on the cover. As a result, the EP was officially released 4 days later on June 29, 2009. In addition, the original release date for the album coincided with the death of Michael Jackson.

== Track listing ==
Genie track listing
| No. | Title | Lyrics | Music | Arrangement | Length |
|---|---|---|---|---|---|
| 1. | "Genie" (소원을 말해봐; Sowoneul Malhaebwa) | Yoo Young-jin | Anne Judith Stokke Wik; Robin Jenssen; Ronny Vidar Svendsen; Nermin Harambašić; Fridolin Nordsø; Yoo Young-jin | Yoo Han-jin | 3:50 |
| 2. | "Etude" | Hwang Seong-je (BJJMusic) | Hwang Seong-je (BJJMusic) | Hwang Seong-je (BJJMusic) | 3:13 |
| 3. | "Girlfriend" (여자친구; Yeojachingu) | Kim Jeong-bae | Kenzie | Kenzie | 3:19 |
| 4. | "Boyfriend" (남자친구; Namjachingu) | Kim Ji Hoo | Carsten Lindberg (Great Dane Productions); Joachim Svares (Great Dane Productions) | Great Dane Productions | 3:50 |
| 5. | "My Child" (동화; Donghwa) | Hwang Seong-je (BJJMusic) | Hwang Seong-je (BJJMusic) | Hwang Seong-je (BJJMusic) | 3:36 |
| 6. | "One Year Later" (1년 後) (sung by Jessica and Onew) | Kim Jin-hwan | Kim Jin-hwan | Kim Jin-hwan | 4:01 |
| Total length: | | | | | 21:52 |

== Release history ==
| Country | Date | Distributing label | Format |
|---|---|---|---|
| South Korea | June 29, 2009 | SM Entertainment | CD |
| Thailand | July 30, 2009 | GMM Grammy | CD |
| Taiwan | August 7, 2009 | Avex Taiwan | CD |
| Philippines | October 2, 2009 | Universal Records | CD |
