= Kissing You (Girls' Generation song) =

- Rhythmer Remix Edition

Single by Girls' Generation

from the album Girls' Generation
- Released: January 13, 2008
- Recorded: 2007
- Genre: K-pop
- Length: 3:19
- Label: SM
- Composer: Lee Jae-myung
- Lyricists: Lee Jae-myung; Kwon Yoon-jung

Girls' Generation singles chronology
"Girls' Generation" (2007)	"Kissing You" (2008)	"Baby Baby" (2008)

Music video
- "Kissing You" on YouTube

"Kissing You" is the third single by South Korean girl group Girls' Generation, from their debut album, Girls' Generation (2007). Released in early 2008, the single hit number one on both SBS' Inkigayo and Mnet's M Countdown. The song was also won the "Song of the Month" award in February 2008 on KBS' Music Bank.

== Music video ==
The music video for "Kissing You" was released on January 13, 2008. It followed a candy theme, with the group members dressed in white and dancing whilst holding a lollipop. The music video featured a cameo from Super Junior's Donghae as the group members' shared love interest.

== Rhythmer Volume 1 remix single ==
In January 2008, it was announced that people could submit their remixes of "Kissing You" to a website for a chance to have them officially released. The four chosen remixes were then digitally released in March 2008. The Skool Rock Remix Version, the top choice in the competition, was included in the re-release of their debut album, Baby Baby (2008).

== Awards and nominations ==
Year	Date	Category	Result	Ref.
2008	Mnet 20's Choice Awards	Hot Sweet Music Award	Won	

Music programs awards
Program	Date
Inkigayo	February 3, 2008
Inkigayo	February 17, 2008
M Countdown	February 14, 2008
M Countdown	February 28, 2008
Music Bank	February 29, 2008

== Covers ==
"Kissing You" has been covered by other K-pop groups multiple times, including live on Korean music shows as part of special stages. Wonder Girls covered the song on the July 4, 2008 edition of Music Bank, corresponding with Girls' Generation covering Wonder Girls' "Tell Me" on the same show. SM labelmates f(x) covered it in conjunction with Seohyun and Sooyoung, on the New Year's Day 2010 edition of Music Bank. Jessica's younger sister Krystal, a member of F(x), sang Jessica's parts. (Note: aslotuss48 (December 27, 2010). f(x) special - Kissing You w/ SNSD Sooyoung Seohyun Jan 1, 2010 1/2 GIRLS' GENERATION Live HD – via YouTube.)

Lovelyz covered "Kissing You" on the May 19, 2016 edition of M Countdown. Twice's Dahyun, Red Velvet's Yeri, Lovelyz's Kei, GFriend's Umji, Oh My Girl's Arin, (G)I-dle's Yuqi performed the song on the 2018 edition of the KBS Song Festival.

== Track listing ==
- Digital download
1. "Kissing You" – 3:18
- Kissing You – Rhythmer Remix, Volume 1
1. "Kissing You" (Skool Rock Remix) (by 정구현) – 3:06
2. "Kissing You" (House Remix) (by 기현석) – 2:58
3. "Kissing You" (Groovy Candy Remix) (by Philtre) – 2:57
4. "Kissing You" (Funk Remix) (by shoon) – 3:21

== Credits and personnel ==
Credits adapted from album's liner notes. (Note: Girls' Generation (CD liner notes) (in Korean). Girls' Generation. SM Entertainment. 2007. SMK0076.)

Studio

- SM Blue Ocean Studio – recording
- SM Concert Hall Studio – recording, strings recording, mixing
- Sonic Korea – mastering

Personnel

- SM Entertainment – executive producer
- Lee Soo-man – producer
- Kim Young-min – executive supervisor
- Girls' Generation – vocals, background vocals
- Kwon Yun-jeong – lyrics
- Lee Jae-myung – lyrics, composition, arrangement, vocal directing, recording
- Kim Hyo-soo – background vocals
- Lee Seong-ryeol – guitar
- Park Jae-hyun – keyboards
- K String – strings
- Nile Lee – strings conducting, strings arrangement
- Nam Koong-jin – recording, strings recording, mixing
- Jeon Hoon – mastering
