= List of awards and nominations received by Shinee =

Shinee awards and nominations
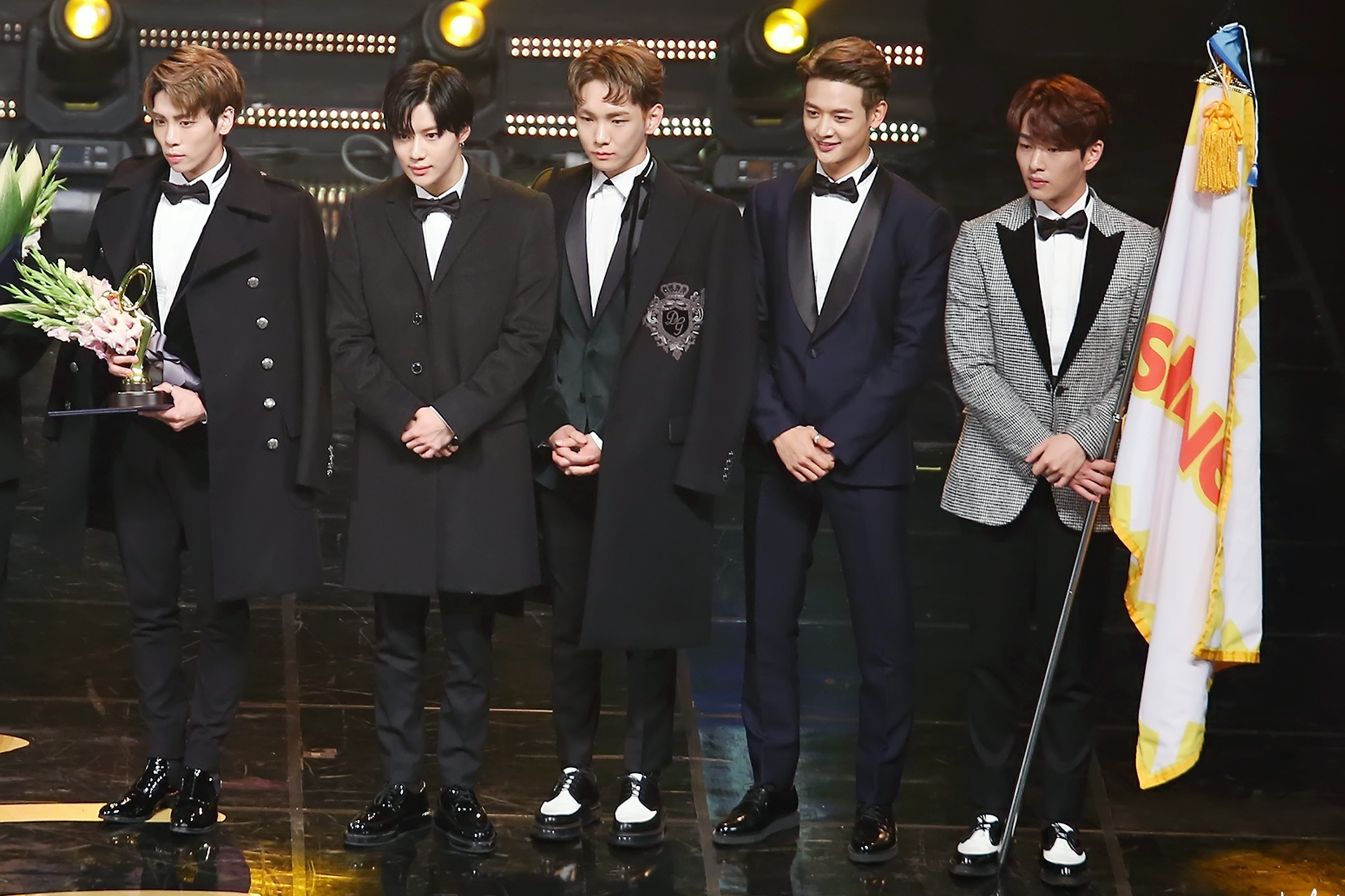
- Shinee during the Korean Popular Culture and Arts Awards in 2016
Awards and nominations
Award	Wins	Nominations
Asia Song Festival	1	1
Brand Customer Loyalty Award	1	1
Brand of the Year Awards	0	1
Channel V Thailand Music Video Awards	0	1
Cyworld Digital Music Awards	2	2
DongFang Music Awards	1	1
Gaon Chart Music Awards	2	4
Golden Disc Awards	13	26
Japan Gold Disc Award	1	1
Korea Culture Entertainment Awards	2	2
Korea Entertainment Arts Awards	2	2
Korean Music Awards	0	5
KU Asian Music Awards	1	1
MAMA Awards	4	24
MBC Entertainment Awards	1	1
MBC Plus X Genie Music Awards	0	3
Melon Music Awards	5	19
Mnet 20's Choice Awards	2	3
MTV Video Music Awards Japan	0	1
Myx Music Awards	0	1
Red Dot Design Award	4	4
SBS MTV Best of the Best	4	4
Seoul Music Awards	12	20
Singapore Entertainment Awards	1	5
Soribada Best K-Music Awards	0	4
Style Icon Awards	2	3
Tower Records Awards	2	2

Totals (Note: Certain award groups do not simply award one winner. They acknowledge several different recipients, have runners-up, and have third place. Since this is a specific recognition and is different from losing an award, runner-up mentions are considered wins in this award tally. For simplification and to avoid errors, each award in this list has been presumed to have had a prior nomination.)
- Wins: 63
- Nominations: 142

South Korean boy group Shinee have received several awards and nominations for their music work. The group was formed by SM Entertainment in 2008 and released their first full-length album, The Shinee World, on August 28, 2008, which won the Newcomer Album of the Year at the 23rd Golden Disk Awards. The first single released from the album was "Love Like Oxygen", which won first place on M Countdown on September 18, 2008, making it the group's first win on Korean music shows since debut. Their second album Lucifer (2010) produced two singles, "Lucifer" and "Hello". For their outstanding choreography the group was nominated for the Best Dance Performance Award at the Mnet Asian Music Awards in 2010. Lucifer also won the Disk Bonsang Award at the 25th Golden Disk Awards, as well as the Popularity Award. On March 21, 2012, the group released their fourth EP Sherlock, for which the group was awarded another Disk Bonsang Award at the 27th Golden Disc Awards and the Bonsang Award at the 22nd Seoul Music Award. Following the success of the lead single, it was nominated for Song of the Year at the 2012 Mnet Asian Music Awards.

Following Shinee's successful promotions for their third Korean studio album, which was divided into two parts, the group was crowned Artist of the Year at the Melon Music Awards in 2013—one of the biggest award ceremonies in the country, which hands out prizes based on digital sales and online votes. The group has gained recognition for their fashion style, like the Ceci Asia Icon Award at the 28th Golden Disk Awards, as well as for their unique dance performances, winning the Best Dance Performance Award at the Mnet Asian Music Awards three times in a row. The group has also been awarded the Communication Design Award Package at the Red Dot Design Award several times for their album design.

== Awards and nominations ==
Name of the award ceremony, year presented, category, nominee(s) of the award, and the result of the nomination
Award ceremony	Year	Category	Nominee / work	Result	Ref.
Asia Song Festival	2008	Best New Asian Artist	Shinee	Won	
Brand Customer Loyalty Awards	2021	Male Idol	Shinee	Won	
Brand of the Year Awards	2021	Boy Idol of the Year	Shinee	Nominated	
Channel V Thailand Music Video Awards	2009	Popular Asian Artist	Shinee	Nominated	
Cyworld Digital Music Awards	2008	Rookie of the Month (May)	"Replay"	Won	
Cyworld Digital Music Awards	2009	Ting's Choice Artist (November)	"Ring Ding Dong"	Won	
DongFang Music Awards	2016	Asia's Best Group Award	Shinee	Won	
Gaon Chart Music Awards	2016	Album of the Year – 2nd Quarter	Odd	Nominated	
Gaon Chart Music Awards	2017	Hallyu World Star	Shinee	Won	
Gaon Chart Music Awards	2022	Song of the Year – February	"Don't Call Me"	Won	
Gaon Chart Music Awards	2022	Album of the Year – 1st Quarter	Don't Call Me	Nominated	
Golden Disc Awards	2008	Rookie of the Year – Album	The Shinee World	Won	
Golden Disc Awards	2008	Disc Bonsang	The Shinee World	Nominated	
Golden Disc Awards	2008	Rookie of the Year – Digital Music	"Replay"	Nominated	
Golden Disc Awards	2008	Popularity Award	Shinee	Nominated	
Golden Disc Awards	2009	Popularity Award	Shinee	Won	
Golden Disc Awards	2009	Digital Bonsang	"Ring Ding Dong"	Nominated	
Golden Disc Awards	2010	Popularity Award	Shinee	Won	
Golden Disc Awards	2010	Disk Bonsang	Lucifer	Won	
Golden Disc Awards	2010	Disk Daesang	Lucifer	Nominated	
Golden Disc Awards	2013	Popularity Award	Shinee	Won	
Golden Disc Awards	2013	Disk Bonsang	Sherlock	Won	
Golden Disc Awards	2013	Disk Daesang	Sherlock	Nominated	
Golden Disc Awards	2014	Ceci Asia Icon Award	Shinee	Won	
Golden Disc Awards	2014	Popularity Award	Shinee	Won	
Golden Disc Awards	2014	Disk Bonsang	Dream Girl – The Misconceptions of You	Won	
Golden Disc Awards	2014	Disk Daesang	Dream Girl – The Misconceptions of You	Nominated	
Golden Disc Awards	2016	Popularity Award	Shinee	Won	
Golden Disc Awards	2016	Disk Bonsang	Odd	Won	
Golden Disc Awards	2016	Disk Daesang	Odd	Nominated	
Golden Disc Awards	2016	Digital Bonsang	"View"	Nominated	
Golden Disc Awards	2017	Popularity Award	Shinee	Won	
Golden Disc Awards	2017	Disk Bonsang	1 of 1	Won	
Golden Disc Awards	2017	Disk Daesang	1 of 1	Nominated	
Golden Disc Awards	2022	Digital Bonsang	"Don't Call Me"	Nominated	
Golden Disc Awards	2022	Disk Bonsang	Don't Call Me	Nominated	
Golden Disc Awards	2022	Seezn Most Popular Artist Award	Shinee	Nominated	
Hanteo Music Awards	2024	Artist of the Year	Shinee	Nominated	
Japan Gold Disc Award	2018	Best 3 Albums (Asia)	Five	Won	
Korean Culture and Entertainment Awards	2008	Top 10 New Generation Singer Award	Shinee	Won	
Korean Culture and Entertainment Awards	2012	Best Male Vocalist	Shinee	Won	
Korean Entertainment Arts Awards	2008	Best Newcomer	Shinee	Won	
Korean Entertainment Arts Awards	2010	Male Group Award	Shinee	Won	
Korean Music Awards	2010	Best Pop Song	"Ring Ding Dong"	Nominated	
Korean Music Awards	2010	Group Musician of the Year Netizen Vote	Shinee	Nominated	
Korean Music Awards	2014	Best Dance & Electronic Album	The Misconceptions of Us	Nominated	
Korean Music Awards	2014	Group Musician of the Year Netizen Vote	Shinee	Nominated	
Korean Music Awards	2022	Best K-Pop Album	Atlantis	Nominated	
KU Asian Music Awards	2016	Asia's Best Group Award	Shinee	Won	
MAMA Awards	2008	Best New Male Group	Shinee	Won	
MAMA Awards	2010	Best Dance Performance – Male Group	"Lucifer"	Nominated	
MAMA Awards	2012	Best Dance Performance – Male Group	"Sherlock (Clue + Note)"	Won	
MAMA Awards	2012	Song of the Year	"Sherlock (Clue + Note)"	Nominated	
MAMA Awards	2013	Best Dance Performance – Male Group	"Dream Girl"	Won	
MAMA Awards	2013	Best Male Group	Shinee	Nominated	
MAMA Awards	2013	Artist of the Year	Shinee	Nominated	
MAMA Awards	2013	Song of the Year	"Dream Girl"	Nominated	
MAMA Awards	2013	Album of the Year	Dream Girl – The Misconceptions of You	Nominated	
MAMA Awards	2015	Best Dance Performance – Male Group	"View"	Won	
MAMA Awards	2015	Song of the Year	"View"	Nominated	
MAMA Awards	2015	Best Male Group	Shinee	Nominated	
MAMA Awards	2015	Artist of the Year	Shinee	Nominated	
MAMA Awards	2015	Album of the Year	Odd	Nominated	
MAMA Awards	2015	Best Music Video	"Married to the Music"	Nominated	
MAMA Awards	2016	Best Male Group	Shinee	Nominated	
MAMA Awards	2016	Artist of the Year	Shinee	Nominated	
MAMA Awards	2016	Album of the Year	1 of 1	Nominated	
MAMA Awards	2018	Best Music Video	"Good Evening"	Nominated	
MAMA Awards	2021	Song of the Year	"Don't Call Me"	Nominated	
MAMA Awards	2021	Best Dance Performance – Male Group	"Don't Call Me"	Nominated	
MAMA Awards	2021	Worldwide Fans' Choice Top 10	Shinee	Nominated	
MAMA Awards	2023	Worldwide Fans' Choice Top 10	Shinee	Nominated	
MAMA Awards	2025	Fans' Choice Top 10 – Male	Shinee	Nominated	
MBC Entertainment Awards	2013	Popularity Award	Shinee	Won	
MBC Plus X Genie Music Awards	2018	Song of the Year	"Good Evening"	Nominated	
MBC Plus X Genie Music Awards	2018	Dance Track (Male)	"Good Evening"	Nominated	
MBC Plus X Genie Music Awards	2018	Genie Music Popularity Award	Shinee	Nominated	
Melon Music Awards	2008	Best Newcomer	Shinee	Won	
Melon Music Awards	2009	Bonsang	Shinee	Nominated	
Melon Music Awards	2009	Star Award	Shinee	Nominated	
Melon Music Awards	2010	Netizens Popularity Battle Award	"Lucifer"	Nominated	
Melon Music Awards	2010	Bonsang	Shinee	Nominated	
Melon Music Awards	2012	Global Star Award	Shinee	Nominated	
Melon Music Awards	2013	Bonsang	Shinee	Won	
Melon Music Awards	2013	Artist of the Year	Shinee	Won	
Melon Music Awards	2013	Album of the Year	Dream Girl – The Misconceptions of You	Nominated	
Melon Music Awards	2013	Netizen Popularity Award	Shinee	Nominated	
Melon Music Awards	2015	Bonsang	Shinee	Won	
Melon Music Awards	2015	Artist of the Year	Shinee	Nominated	
Melon Music Awards	2015	Netizen Popularity Award	Shinee	Nominated	
Melon Music Awards	2015	Album of the Year	Odd	Nominated	
Melon Music Awards	2021	Bonsang	Shinee	Nominated	
Melon Music Awards	2021	Album of the Year	Don't Call Me	Nominated	
Melon Music Awards	2021	Best Male Group	Shinee	Nominated	
Melon Music Awards	2023	Millions Top 10	Shinee	Nominated	
Melon Music Awards	2023	Stage of the Year	Shinee World VI: Perfect Illumination	Won	
Mnet 20's Choice Awards	2008	Hot New Star	Shinee	Won	
Mnet 20's Choice Awards	2012	20's Performance	"Sherlock (Clue + Note)"	Nominated	
Mnet 20's Choice Awards	2013	20's Performance	"Dream Girl"	Won	
MTV Video Music Awards Japan	2012	Best Choreography	"Lucifer"	Nominated	
Myx Music Awards	2014	Favorite K-pop Video	"Everybody"	Nominated	
Red Dot Design Award	2014	Communication Design Award Package	Sherlock	Won	
Red Dot Design Award	2014	Communication Design Award Package	Dream Girl – The Misconceptions of You	Won	
Red Dot Design Award	2014	Communication Design Award Package	Why So Serious? – The Misconceptions of Me	Won	
Red Dot Design Award	2014	Communication Design Award Package	The Misconceptions of Us	Won	
SBS MTV Best of the Best	2011	Global Star	Shinee	Won	
SBS MTV Best of the Best	2012	Live Performance	Shinee	Won	
SBS MTV Best of the Best	2012	Best Group Male	Shinee	Won	
SBS MTV Best of the Best	2013	Artist of the Year	Shinee	Won	
Seoul Music Awards	2009	Best Newcomer	Shinee	Won	
Seoul Music Awards	2009	Popularity Award	Shinee	Nominated	
Seoul Music Awards	2010	Bonsang Award	2009, Year of Us	Won	
Seoul Music Awards	2011	Bonsang Award	Lucifer	Won	
Seoul Music Awards	2011	Popularity Award	Shinee	Won	
Seoul Music Awards	2013	Bonsang Award	Sherlock	Won	
Seoul Music Awards	2013	Popularity Award	Shinee	Won	
Seoul Music Awards	2014	Bonsang Award	Dream Girl – The Misconceptions of You	Won	
Seoul Music Awards	2014	Popularity Award	Shinee	Won	
Seoul Music Awards	2014	Hallyu Special Award	Shinee	Won	
Seoul Music Awards	2016	Bonsang Award	Odd	Won	
Seoul Music Awards	2017	Popularity Award	Shinee	Won	
Seoul Music Awards	2019	Popularity Award	Shinee	Won	
Seoul Music Awards	2022	Bonsang Award	Don't Call Me	Nominated	
Seoul Music Awards	2022	Popularity Award	Shinee	Nominated	
Seoul Music Awards	2022	K-Wave Special Award	Shinee	Nominated	
Seoul Music Awards	2024	Bonsang Award	Hard	Nominated	
Seoul Music Awards	2024	Popularity Award	Shinee	Nominated	
Seoul Music Awards	2024	K-Wave Special Award	Shinee	Nominated	
Seoul Music Awards	2024	Male Singer – Group	Shinee	Nominated	
Singapore Entertainment Awards	2010	New Generation Artist	Shinee	Won	
Singapore Entertainment Awards	2011	Korean Artist Popularity Award	Shinee	Nominated	
Singapore Entertainment Awards	2012	Most Popular Korean Artist	Shinee	Nominated	
Singapore Entertainment Awards	2013	Most Popular Korean Singer	Shinee	Nominated	
Singapore Entertainment Awards	2013	Most Popular Music Video	"Sherlock (Clue + Note)"	Nominated	
Soribada Best K-Music Awards	2017	Bonsang Award	Shinee	Nominated	
Soribada Best K-Music Awards	2018	Bonsang Award	Shinee	Nominated	
Soribada Best K-Music Awards	2018	Popularity Award (Male)	Shinee	Nominated	
Soribada Best K-Music Awards	2018	Global Fandom Award	Shinee	Nominated	
Style Icon Awards	2008	New Icon Award	Shinee	Won	
Style Icon Awards	2013	10 Style Icons	Shinee	Nominated	
Style Icon Awards	2016	Awesome Asian Choice Award	Shinee	Won	
Tower Records Awards	2011	Artist of the Year	Shinee	Won	
Tower Records Awards	2011	Single of the Year	"Replay (Kimi wa Boku no Everything)"	Won	

== Other accolades ==
=== State and cultural honors ===
Name of country or organization, year given, and name of honor
Country or organization	Year	Honor	Ref.
South Korea (Note: Honors are given at the Korean Popular Culture and Arts Awards, arranged by the Korea Creative Content Agency and hosted by the Ministry of Culture, Sports and Tourism. They are awarded to those who have contributed to the arts and South Korea's pop culture.)	2012	Minister of Culture, Sports and Tourism Commendation	
South Korea	2016	Prime Minister's Commendation	

=== Listicles ===
Name of publisher, year listed, name of listicle, and placement
Publisher	Year	Listicle	Placement	Ref.
The Dong-a Ilbo	2016	Best Male Artists According to Experts	3rd	
Forbes	2014	Korea Power Celebrity	8th	
Forbes	2016	Korea Power Celebrity	12th	
