= SM Town Live '10 World Tour =

2010–11 concert tour by SM Town

- World tour by SM Town
- Promotional image for SM Town Live '10 World Tour in Seoul
- Location: Asia; North America; Europe
- Start date: 21 August 2010
- End date: 23 October 2011
- No. of shows: 7 in Asia; 2 in North America; 2 in Europe; 11 in total

SM Town concert chronology
- SM Town Live '08 (2008–09); SM Town Live '10 World Tour (2010–11); SM Town Live World Tour III (2012–13)

SM Town Live '10 World Tour was the 2010–11 worldwide live concert tour by SM Town. The tour commenced with one show in Seoul in August 2010 and continued on to the United States, Japan, China and France.

== Background ==
SM Town is the name for the artists under the Korean record label SM Entertainment. Each year the company organizes its artists to come together and perform on a four to six hours long concert that tours around the world.

== Concerts ==
The first concert in Seoul reportedly lasted for six hours and featured 80 songs by various SM artists, as well as performances by the actors Kim Min-jong, Go Ara and Lee Yeon-hee. The Shanghai concert on 11 September 2010 was played to an audience of 25,000 people including performances of 54 songs. It also included a celebration for Kangta's 15th anniversary in the music industry, with a special video of his past activities.

The concert at Staples Center in Los Angeles was attended by 15,000 fans. SM Entertainment hired the 3D movie production specialist Cameron Pace Group (a James Cameron company), which brought in the popular live music director Keith Hobelman to capture the evening's performance. The show was shown in theaters in 3D and there was also a Blu-ray DVD format made for retail. It was placed at #10 on the US Billboard Boxcore chart, with ticket sales at over US$1 million. It was the first time that Asian artists charted in the top 10.

The first two-day Tokyo concert at Yoyogi National Stadium attracted an audience of 24,000. The second leg of the concert in Tokyo was originally scheduled for 9 and 10 April but was postponed until September, out of respect after the 2011 Tōhoku earthquake and tsunami in March.

== Performers ==
Seoul (21 August 2010)

Performers

- BoA
- f(x) (except Amber)
- Girls' Generation
- The Grace (except Stephanie)
- J-Min
- Kangta
- Shinee
- Super Junior
- Super Junior-M
- TRAX
- TVXQ
- Zhang Li Yin
- Kim Min-jong
- Go Ara
- Lee Yeon-hee
Los Angeles (4 September 2010)

Performers

- BoA
- f(x) (except Amber)
- Girls' Generation
- The Grace (only Dana and Sunday)
- J-Min
- Kangta
- Shinee
- Super Junior
- Super Junior-M
- TRAX
- TVXQ
- Zhang Li Yin
- Kim Min-jong
- Go Ara
- Lee Yeon-hee
Shanghai (11 September 2010)

Performers

- BoA
- f(x) (except Amber)
- Girls' Generation
- Kangta
- Shinee
- Super Junior
- Super Junior-M
- TRAX
- TVXQ (only Max and U-Know)
- Zhang Li Yin
Tokyo (25/26 January 2011)

Performers

- 72
- BoA
- f(x) (except Amber)
- Girls' Generation
- J-Min
- Kangta
- Shinee
- Super Junior
- Super Junior-M
- TRAX
- TVXQ (only Max and U-Know)
Paris (10/11 June 2011)

Performers

- f(x)
- Girls' Generation
- Shinee
- Super Junior
- TVXQ (only Max and U-Know)
Tokyo (2/3/4 September 2011)

Performers

- BoA
- f(x)
- Girls' Generation (except Sooyoung)
- The Grace (only Dana and Sunday)
- J-Min
- Kangta
- Kim Min Jong
- Shinee
- Super Junior (except Heechul)
- Super Junior-M
- TVXQ (only Max and U-Know)
New York (23 October 2011)

Performers

- BoA
- f(x)
- Girls' Generation
- Kangta
- Shinee
- Super Junior (except Heechul and Siwon)
- Super Junior-M
- TVXQ (only Max and U-Know)

== Set list ==
Los Angeles (4 September 2010)

Performers

1. "Shine" (J-Min)
2. "Don't Cry" (J-Min)
3. "Angels" (Sunday)
4. "Out of Sight, Out of Mind" (Dana)
5. "My Everything" (Dana & Sunday-The Grace)
6. "La Cha Ta" (f(x))
7. "Tik Tok" (Krystal & Jessica)
8. "Chu~♡" (f(x))
9. "I Will" (Zhang Liyin)
10. "Moving On" (Zhang Liyin)
11. "Pine Tree" + "Polaris" (Kangta)
12. "7989" (Kangta and Ara)
13. "Beautiful Heartache" (Kim Min Jong)
14. "Stand By Me" (Shinee)
15. "Replay" (Shinee)
16. "Get Down" (Shinee)
17. "Juliette" (Shinee)
18. "Let You Go" (TRAX)
19. "Oh My Goddess" (TRAX)
20. "Slow Motion" (Lee Yeon Hee and Taemin)
21. "Another Heaven" (Zhou Mi and Luna)
22. "Sonata of Temptation" (Heechul, Henry and Jay)
23. "Call With All My Heart" (Kyuhyun and Seohyun)
24. "Sea of Love" (Jonghyun and Yesung)
25. "A-Yo" (Key, Minho, Eunhyuk and Shindong)
26. "Run Devil Run" (Girls' Generation)
27. "Kissing You" (Girls' Generation)
28. "Super Girl" (Super Junior)
29. "No Other" (Super Junior)
30. "Bonamana" (Super Junior)
31. "Way To Go!" (Girls' Generation)
32. "Dancing Out" (Super Junior)
33. "My Name" (BoA)
34. "I Did It for Love" (BoA and Key)
35. "Sorry, Sorry" (Super Junior)
36. "Genie" (Girls' Generation)
37. "Ring Ding Dong (Shinee)
38. "Nu ABO" (f(x))
39. "A Man in Love" (Super Junior)
40. "Mr. Boogie" (f(x))
41. "Paradox" (TRAX feat. Heechul)
42. "Up and Down" (Shinee)
43. "Oh!" (Girls' Generation)
44. "Quasimodo" (Shinee)
45. "The Name I Loved" (Onew and Ryeowook)
46. "Dangerous" (BoA)
47. "Stand By" (BoA)
48. "Energetic (BoA)
49. "The Way You Are"/"Rising Sun"/"Mirotic"/"Purple Line" (TVXQ)
50. "Big Time" (MAX)
51. "Keep Your Head Down" (U-Know)
52. "Don't Don" (Super Junior, MAX and TRAX)
53. "Maximum" (TVXQ)
54. "Lucifer" (Shinee)
55. "Gee" (Girls' Generation)
56. "U" (Super Junior)
57. "Hurricane Venus" (BoA)
58. "Hope" (SM Town)
Paris (10/11 June 2011)

Performers

1. "La Cha Ta" (f(x))
2. "Tik Tok" (Krystal & Jessica)
3. "Chu~♡" (f(x))
4. "Stand By Me" (Shinee)
5. "Replay" (Shinee)
6. "Get Down" (Shinee)
7. "Juliette" (Shinee)
8. "Sorry, Sorry Answer" (R&B Remix) (Super Junior K.R.Y.)
9. "Way Back Into Love" (Kyuhyun and Seohyun)
10. "Single Ladies" + "Poker Face" + "Crazy In Love" (Shindong, Eunhyuk, Leeteuk and Heechul)
11. "A-Yo" (Key, Minho, Eunhyuk and Shindong)
12. "Run Devil Run" (Girls' Generation)
13. "My Child" (Girls' Generation)
14. "Kissing You" (Girls' Generation)
15. "Super Girl" (Super Junior)
16. "No Other" (Super Junior)
17. "HaHaHa Song" (Girls' Generation)
18. "Way To Go!" (Girls' Generation)
19. "Miracle" (Super Junior)
20. "Dancing Out" (Super Junior)
21. "Genie" (Girls' Generation)
22. "Nu ABO" (f(x))
23. "Ring Ding Dong (Shinee)
24. "Sorry, Sorry" (Super Junior)
25. "Don't Don" (Super Junior)
26. "Gangsta Boy" (f(x))
27. "Hello" (Shinee)
28. "Ready or Not" (Shinee)
29. "A.Mi.Go" (Shinee)
30. "Hoot" (Girls' Generation)
31. "Oh!" (Girls' Generation)
32. "Nessun Dorma" (Onew)
33. "The Way You Are"/"Mirotic" (TVXQ)
34. "Maximum" (TVXQ)
35. "Before U Go" (TVXQ)
36. "Keep Your Head Down" (TVXQ)
37. "Bonamana" (Super Junior)
38. "A Man in Love" (Super Junior)
39. "Pinocchio (Danger)" (f(x))
40. "Lucifer" (Shinee)
41. "Gee" (Girls' Generation)
42. "U" (Super Junior)
43. "Rising Sun" (TVXQ)
44. "Sorry, Sorry" (SM Town)
45. "Hope" (SM Town)
New York (23 October 2011)

Performers

1. "La Cha Ta" (f(x))
2. "Tik Tok" (Krystal & Jessica)
3. "Chu~♡" (f(x))
4. "Pine Tree" + "Polaris" (Kangta)
5. "7989" (Kangta, Sulli and Onew)
6. "Stand by Me" (Shinee)
7. "Replay" (Shinee)
8. "Get Down" (Shinee)
9. "Juliette" (Shinee)
10. "Sorry, Sorry Answer" (R&B Remix) (Super Junior K.R.Y.)
11. "My First Kiss" (Key and Krystal)
12. "Way Back Into Love" (Kyuhyun and Seohyun)
13. "A-Yo" (Key/Minho, Eunhyuk and Shindong)
14. "Run Devil Run" (Girls' Generation)
15. "Kissing You" (Girls' Generation)
16. "Oh!" (Girls' Generation)
17. "Bonamana" (Super Junior)
18. "Perfection" (Super Junior-M)
19. "HaHaHaSong" (Girls' Generation)
20. "Way to Go!" (Girls' Generation)
21. "Miracle" (Super Junior)
22. "Dancing Out" (Remix) (Super Junior)
23. "Look Who's Talking" (BoA)
24. "I Did It for Love" (BoA and Key)
25. "Genie" (Girls' Generation)
26. "Sorry, Sorry" (Super Junior)
27. "Ring Ding Dong" (Shinee)
28. "Nu ABO" (f(x))
29. "Mr. Simple" (Super Junior)
30. "Don't Don" (Super Junior)
31. "Breaka Shaka" (Kangta)
32. "Hot Summer" (f(x))
33. "Hoot" (Girls' Generation)
34. "Ready or Not" (Shinee)
35. "A.Mi.Go" (Shinee)
36. "The Boys <English Version>" (Girls' Generation)
37. "Nessun Dorma" (Onew)
38. "Eat You Up" (BoA)
39. "Copy & Paste" (BoA)
40. "Energetic (BoA)
41. "The Way You Are"/"Mirotic" (TVXQ)
42. "Maximum" (TVXQ)
43. "Before U Go" (TVXQ)
44. "Keep Your Head Down" (TVXQ)
45. "Pinocchio (Danger)" (f(x))
46. "Lucifer" (Shinee)
47. "Gee" (Girls' Generation)
48. "U" (Super Junior)
49. "Rising Sun" (TVXQ)
50. "Hurricane Venus" (BoA)
51. "Hope" (SM Town)

== Tour dates ==
Date	City	Country	Venue	Attendance	Revenue
Asia
21 August 2010	Seoul	South Korea	Seoul Olympic Stadium	35,000	—N/a
North America
4 September 2010	Los Angeles	United States	Staples Center	15,015	$1,101,582
Asia
11 September 2010	Shanghai	China	Hongkou Stadium	25,000	—N/a
25 January 2011	Tokyo	Japan	National Yoyogi Stadium	24,000	—N/a
26 January 2011	Tokyo	Japan	National Yoyogi Stadium	24,000	—N/a
Europe
10 June 2011	Paris	France	Le Zénith	14,000	—N/a
11 June 2011	Paris	France	Le Zénith	14,000	—N/a
Asia
2 September 2011	Tokyo	Japan	Tokyo Dome	150,000	₩26,500,000,000
3 September 2011	Tokyo	Japan	Tokyo Dome	150,000	₩26,500,000,000
4 September 2011	Tokyo	Japan	Tokyo Dome	150,000	₩26,500,000,000
North America
23 October 2011	New York City	United States	Madison Square Garden	11,439	$1,600,000
Total				274,454	$2,701,582

== Media ==
DVD

- SM Town Live in Tokyo Special Edition (2011)

Film

- I AM. - SM Town Live World Tour in Madison Square Garden (10 May 2012 but postponed to 21 June 2012, due to audio issues)

Television

- SM Town Live in Tokyo on MBC 9 April 2012 for 90-minute, featured backstage interviews.
