= The First (Shinee album) =

Studio album by Shinee

- Digital cover

Studio album by Shinee
- Released: December 7, 2011
- Recorded: April–October 2011
- Studios: Doobdoob (Seoul); Hub (Seoul); SM Blue Ocean (Seoul); SM Booming System (Seoul); SM Concert Hall (Seoul)
- Genre: J-pop
- Length: 43:59
- Languages: Japanese; English
- Labels: EMI; Virgin
- Producers: San-e Ichii; Akira Miyake; Lee Soo-man

Shinee chronology
Lucifer (2010)	The First (2011)	Sherlock (2012)

Singles from The First
- 1. "Replay (Kimi wa Boku no Everything)" Released: June 22, 2011; 2. "Juliette" Released: August 29, 2011; 3. "Lucifer" Released: October 12, 2011

The First is the first Japanese studio album by South Korean boy group Shinee. The album was scheduled for release on November 23, 2011; however, it was delayed to December 7, 2011, in Japan under EMI Music Japan. The album features three previously released singles, "Replay", "Juliette" and "Lucifer", all of which ranked within the top three on the Oricon Singles Chart.

== Release ==
Three of the songs from the album have been released as A-side singles: "Replay", "Juliette" and "Lucifer". On January 13, 2012, The First was certified Gold by RIAJ for selling over 100,000 copies.

The album was released in three versions: a "special box", a limited edition and a regular edition. The special box contains a DVD, an 88-page photo book, a can badge type MP3 player including all the album tracks, and an original 2012 calendar. The DVD includes digest of "Japan Debut Premium Reception Tour" and jacket photo shooting. The limited edition contains a DVD, a 68-page photo book, and a desktop calendar for 2012. The DVD includes digest of "Japan Debut Premium Reception Tour in Japan" and digest of "Japan Debut Premium Reception Tour in London". The regular edition contains a bonus song, "Stranger", the main theme of the TV drama series Strangers 6. It also comes with a 44-page photo book.

== Singles ==
=== "Replay (Kimi wa Boku no Everything)" ===
Shinee's debut Japanese single was released on June 22, 2011. It is a remake of their debut Korean single "Replay", included on their Korean debut extended play of the same name. The B-side is the Japanese version of their Korean single "Hello", part of their second repackage album. The single was released in two CD+DVD versions. The limited version was packed in a digipack including two bonus tracks, a 68-page photobook and a random (1 of 6) trading card. The regular version contains a different 44-page photobook and a postcard (for first press only).

In the first week of sales, the single sold 91,419 copies and reached number two on the Oricon Weekly Chart. It was the highest sales a Korean idol group had recorded for their debut single in the first week. It was certified gold by RIAJ for having 100,000 physical copies shipped in June 2011, a first for a debut single by a Korean male group. It also won Single of the Year at the 2011 K-Pop Lovers! Awards, hosted by Tower Records Online.

=== "Juliette" ===
"Juliette" was released on August 29, 2011, as Shinee's second Japanese single, with an original Japanese song, "Kiss Kiss Kiss", as the B-side.

=== "Lucifer" ===
On October 12, 2011, a Japanese version of "Lucifer" was released as Shinee's third Japanese single. The B-side is the Japanese version of their Korean single "Love Like Oxygen", from their first album, The Shinee World. It was released in three versions: a limited edition type A, which included a can badge-type MP3 player including the song "Lucifer", a bonus DVD, a 68-page photo book, a trading card, and digipack; a limited edition type B with the same contents as type A but minus the MP3 player; and a regular edition including a bonus DVD and a 44-page photo book. It was Shinee's third single to rank inside the top three of the Oricon charts, following their debut "Replay" and "Juliette," setting a new record for a foreign artist in the country.

== Promotion ==
Shinee were scheduled to hold a surprise event where they would perform songs from the album on December 7 in Shibuya, Tokyo. However, it was cancelled due to safety reasons after it attracted heavy crowds. They held a concert to celebrate the successful release of their first Japan album on December 24 at the Tokyo International Forum Hall A. They performed the concert three times in order to accommodate the 15,000 fans that won the lottery to attend. Onew opened the concert by shouting out, "Let’s have some fun with Shinee today!". They performed a total of six songs, including their debut single, "Replay -Kimi wa Boku no Everything-" and "Lucifer", as well as a new song from their album called "To Your Heart". They followed the concert with a 20 performance tour, Shinee World 2012, hitting seven locations around Japan. The tour attracted 200,000 concert-goers, setting a new attendance record for the first Japan tour of a Korean artist.

== Track listing ==
The First track listing
No.	Title	Lyrics	Music	Arrangement	Length
1.	"Lucifer" (Japanese version)	STY (Digz Inc.); Yoo Young-jin; Bebe Rexha	Rexha; Ryan S. Jhun; Yoo; Adam Kapit	Rexha; Jhun; Kapit	3:54
2.	"Amigo" (Japanese version)	Shōko Fujibayashi; Yoo	Jimmy Andrew Richard; Sean Alexander (Avenue 52); Gabe Lopez; Michael Snyder	Yoo	2:58
3.	"Juliette" (Japanese version)	Natsumi Kobayashi; Jonghyun; Minho	Mikkel Remee Sigvardt; Jay Sean; Mich Hansen; Joseph Belmaati	Cho Yong-hoon; Jeon Hong-sung	3:25
4.	"Better"	Sara Sakurai (T's Music); Minho	Steven Lee; Alexander; Drew Ryan Scott	Lee; Alexander; Scott	3:11
5.	"To Your Heart"	Kanata Okajima; Minho	Erik Lidbom; Jon Hällgren	Lidbom; Hällgren	3:21
6.	"Always Love"	Kobayashi	iDR; Jhun; 12keyz	iDR; Jhun; 12keyz	3:44
7.	"Replay (Kimi wa Boku no Everything)" (Replay -君は僕のeverything-, Replay (You Are My Everything)) (Japanese version)	Hiro (Digz Inc.); Young-hu Kim	Jack Kugell (The Heavyweights); Jason Pennock (The Heavyweights); Tchaka Diallo (The Heavyweights)	The Heavyweights; Yoo	3:35
8.	"Start"	Sakurai	Josef Salimi; Scott; Sammy Naja	Salimi; Scott; Naja	3:56
9.	"Love Like Oxygen" (Japanese version)	Kobayashi; Young-hu Kim; Kwon Yoon-jung; Minho; JQ (Makeumine Works)	Lucas Secon; Thomas Troelsen; Sigvardt	Cho	3:02
10.	"Hello" (Japanese version)	Kobayashi; Kim Eana; Minho	Tim "Data" McEwan; Jess Cates; Lars Halvor Jensen	Park Bum-geum	3:04
11.	"The Shinee World" (Japanese version)	Nakamura Kanata; Yoo	Yoo	Yoo	3:55
12.	"Seesaw"	Okajima	Shaffer Smith; Christopher James Brenner	Smith; Brenner	2:41
13.	"Stranger" (Bonus track)	Kobayashi; Minho	Kenzie	Kenzie	3:13
Total length:					43:59

DVD
No.	Title	Length
1.	"Japan Debut Premium Reception Digest Movie in Japan"
3.	"Jacket Shooting Sketch" (Limited edition Special Box only)

== Charts ==
Chart performance for The First
Chart (2011–2012)	Peak position
Japanese Albums (Oricon)	4
South Korean Albums (Gaon)	3
Taiwanese Albums (G-Music)	4

== Release history ==
Release dates and formats for The First
Region	Date	Format	Label
Various	December 2, 2011	Digital download; streaming	EMI
Japan	December 7, 2011	CD	EMI
South Korea	February 29, 2012	Digital download; streaming	SM; KMP
