= Shinee World 2012 =

2012 concert tour by Shinee

- Japan tour by Shinee
- The official logo of the tour
- Location: Japan
- Associated album: The First
- Start date: April 25, 2012
- End date: July 1, 2012
- No. of shows: 20

Shinee concert chronology
- Shinee World (2010–2011); Shinee World 2012 (2012); Shinee World II (2012)

Shinee World 2012 (promoted as THE FIRST JAPAN ARENA TOUR "SHINee WORLD 2012") was the first Japan nationwide concert tour by South Korean boy group Shinee to support their first Japanese studio album, The First. The tour kicked off in Fukuoka on April 25, 2012, and ended in Hiroshima on July 1, 2012, with a total of 20 concerts in seven cities. It attracted 200,000 concert-goers, setting a new attendance record for the first Japan tour of a Korean artist.

== History ==
On December 24, 2011, Shinee held a live showcase at the Tokyo International Forum to commemorate the release of their debut Japanese album, The First. At the event, they announced that they would embark on their first Japan nationwide concert tour, titled The First Japan Arena Tour "Shinee World 2012". The tour started on April 25, 2012, with a total of seven stops in Fukuoka, Sapporo, Nagoya, Osaka, Kobe, Tokyo and Hiroshima.

Due to the demand for tickets, it was announced on February 13, 2012, that six additional dates had been added to the line-up. This included one concert in Nagoya, three concerts in Osaka, and two concerts in Tokyo, for a total of 20 concerts. However, as even these dates sold out, additional seats with a restricted view of the stage were added. These also sold out as soon as the tickets went on sale.

The tour attracted 200,000 people during its run. This marked the first time a Korean artist's first Japan arena concert tour had achieved these attendance figures, bringing in revenue of over 25 billion won (US$22 million). On July 28, 2012, Fuji TV broadcast the concert with live video and original interviews.

== Setlist ==
1. "Lucifer" (Japanese ver.)
2. "Amigo" (Japanese ver.)
3. "Juliette" (Japanese ver.)
4. "The Shinee World" (Japanese ver.)
5. "Always Love"
6. "Hello" (Japanese ver.)
7. "Replay (Kimi wa Boku No Everything)"
8. "Get Up!" (Korn feat. Skrillex cover) – Taemin
9. "Turn Up The Music" (Chris Brown cover) – Minho
10. "Friend" (Anzen Chitai cover) (later it was changed to "Itoshiki Hibiyo" (Hirai Ken cover) and then changed back again to "Friend") – Onew
11. "Firework" (Katy Perry cover) (later it was changed to mash-up song "Hair / Judas" (Lady Gaga) – Key
12. "Driver's High" (L'Arc-en-Ciel cover) – Jonghyun
13. "Seesaw"
14. "Sherlock" (Japanese ver.)
15. "Love Like Oxygen" (Japanese ver.)
16. "Better"
17. "Amazing Grace"
18. "Hyeya (Y Si Fuera Ella)" – Jonghyun
19. "Start"
20. "JoJo"
21. "Stranger" (Japanese ver.)
22. "Ready or Not"
23. "Ring Ding Dong"
24. "To Your Heart"
25. "Lucifer" (Japanese ver.)
26. "Kiss Kiss Kiss"
27. "Bodyguard" (Japanese ver.)
28. "Stand By Me" (Japanese ver.)
29. "Keeping Love Again"

== Tour dates ==
List of concerts, showing date, city, country, venue, and attendance
Date	City	Venue	Attendance
April 25, 2012	Fukuoka	Marine Messe Fukuoka	200,000
April 29, 2012	Sapporo	Makomanai Ice Arena	200,000
May 3, 2012	Nagoya	Nippon Gaishi Hall	200,000
May 4, 2012	Nagoya	Nippon Gaishi Hall	200,000
May 5, 2012	Nagoya	Nippon Gaishi Hall	200,000
May 8, 2012	Osaka	Osaka Jo-Hall	200,000
May 9, 2012	Osaka	Osaka Jo-Hall	200,000
May 10, 2012	Osaka	Osaka Jo-Hall	200,000
May 12, 2012	Kobe	World Memorial Hall	200,000
May 13, 2012	Kobe	World Memorial Hall	200,000
May 26, 2012	Osaka	Osaka Jo-Hall	200,000
May 27, 2012	Osaka	Osaka Jo-Hall	200,000
May 30, 2012	Tokyo	Yoyogi National Gymnasium	200,000
May 31, 2012	Tokyo	Yoyogi National Gymnasium	200,000
June 2, 2012	Tokyo	Yoyogi National Gymnasium	200,000
June 3, 2012	Tokyo	Yoyogi National Gymnasium	200,000
June 23, 2012	Tokyo	Yoyogi National Gymnasium	200,000
June 24, 2012	Tokyo	Yoyogi National Gymnasium	200,000
June 30, 2012	Hiroshima	Hiroshima Green Arena	200,000
July 1, 2012	Hiroshima	Hiroshima Green Arena	200,000

== DVD ==
Shinee The First Japan Arena Tour "Shinee World 2012"
- Limited Edition DVD Cover

Video by Shinee
- Released: December 12, 2012
- Recorded: 2012
- Genre: J-pop
- Label: EMI Music Japan

Shinee The First Japan Arena Tour "Shinee World 2012" (promoted as SHINee THE FIRST JAPAN ARENA TOUR "SHINee WORLD 2012") is the third DVD and first Blu-ray by South Korean boy group Shinee. Following the announcement that Shinee would be releasing their sixth Japanese single titled "1000-nen, Zutto Soba ni Ite...' on December 12, 2012, it was also announced that they would be releasing a DVD/Blu-ray for their Shinee World 2012 tour on the same day.

The live DVD features their performance at Yoyogi National Gymnasium on June 23 and 24, 2012, from their first arena tour in Japan, Shinee World 2012. The limited edition includes a bonus movie featuring rehearsal and backstage footage. Set contains 2 live DVDs, a live photo book (100 pages), an original diary 2013, Shinee World 2012 replica bill set (5 pieces), and an original plastic sheet featuring member's solo shot randomly selected from 5 kinds. Features special packaging with a twin tray and a case. The regular edition contains 2 live DVDs, a live photo book (16 pages) in a tall case and documentary of Shinee World 2012 as special features. The live Blu-ray set contains 2 live Blu-ray discs, a live photo book (16 pages) in a BD case and also documentary of Shinee World 2012 as special features.

=== Track listing ===
DISC 1:

1. Opening
2. "Lucifer" (Japanese ver.)
3. "Amigo" (Japanese ver.)
4. "Juliette" (Japanese ver.)
5. "The Shinee World" (Japanese ver.)
6. MC-1
7. "Always Love"
8. "Hello" (Japanese ver.)
9. "Replay (Kimi wa Boku no Everything)"
10. "Seesaw"
11. "Sherlock" (Japanese ver.)
12. "Love Like Oxygen" (Japanese ver.)
13. "Better"
14. "Amazing Grace"
15. "Y Si Fuera Ella"
16. "Tie A yellow Ribbon Round The Ole Oak Tree"
17. "Start"
18. "JoJo"
19. "Stranger" (Japanese ver.)
20. "Ready or Not"
21. "Ring Ding Dong"
22. "To Your Heart"
23. "Lucifer" (Japanese ver.) (Only the high part of the song)
24. Message from Shinee
25. "Kiss Kiss Kiss"

DISC 2: [Encore]

1. "Stand By Me" (Japanese ver.)
2. "Bodyguard" (Japanese ver.)
3. MC-2
4. "Keeping Love Again"
5. Finale

=== Chart performance ===
Released	Oricon Chart	Peak	Sales Total
December 12, 2012	DVD Daily Ranking	1	40,264+
December 12, 2012	DVD Weekly Ranking	2	40,264+
