= The First Japan Arena Tour =

The First Japan Arena Tour may refer to:

- The First Japan Arena Tour (Girls' Generation), 2011
- The First Japan Arena Tour (Shinee), 2012
