= 2009, Year of Us =

EP by Shinee
- Released: October 19, 2009
- Recorded: August–October 2009
- Studios: SM Booming System (Seoul); SM Concert Hall (Seoul); SM Yellow Tail (Seoul)
- Genre: K-pop
- Length: 22:18
- Languages: Korean; English
- Label: SM

Shinee chronology
Romeo (2009)	2009, Year of Us (2009)	Lucifer (2010)

Singles from 2009, Year of Us
- 1. "Ring Ding Dong" Released: October 14, 2009

2009, Year of Us is the third extended play (EP) by South Korean boy group Shinee. It consists of six tracks and it incorporates alternative rock and hip-hop music genres. The digital version of the album was released on October 19, 2009, with a physical release on October 22. The title track, "Ring Ding Dong", was released on October 14, 2009, through various music sites.

== Songs ==
The EP contains six songs, including the title track "Ring Ding Dong", which is an afro-electro song that combines the beat of African congo drums with the sound of an electro synthesizer. It is the work of Yoo Young-jin. The lyrics of the song describe the situation of unconsciously falling in love with someone. The phrase "ring ding dong", which is repeated numerous times throughout the song, is a cartoon-like expression for a bell ringing in someone's head at the very moment of falling in love. In an interview with Big Communications representative Jung Young-jin, it was revealed that because of its catchy hooks and repetitive nature, "Ring Ding Dong" was named the number one banned song before college entrance exams in South Korea. In addition, the album contains songs of various genres such as "JoJo", a eurodance song composed by Kenzie, and the swingbeat song "Shinee Girl". The EP also features Onew's first solo song, "The Name I Loved", a ballad song based on alternative rock featuring veteran singer Kim Yeon-woo. Luna of f(x) also makes an appearance on the hip-hop song "Get Down" with Key and Minho.

== Release and reception ==
2009, Year of Us was Shinee's first release after a five month long absence from the K-pop scene. It was their third EP, with their last being Romeo in May 2009, and was supposed to show a new style for the group as well as the vocal talent of the members. The digital version of the EP was released on October 19, 2009, with a physical release on October 22. Before its release the album recorded 60,000 pre-orders.

The lead single, "Ring Ding Dong", was released digitally on October 14 and charted atop of several Korean music charts and gained popularity all over Asia. It was written by Yoo Young-jin. The group had their debut performance of the song on October 16, on KBS' Music Bank. Misha Gabriel, who previously worked on the group's song "Amigo" in 2008, also choreographed "Ring Ding Dong". The music video was shot in early October on a set in Namyangju, Gyeonggi Province, and was directed by Cho Soo-hyun. "JoJo" was promoted alongside "Ring Ding Dong" as the second promotional track from the album.

The EP was released in Japan on January 20, 2010, with an alternative cover and a bonus DVD. The release peaked at number 40 on the weekly Oricon chart, charting for three weeks.

== Track listing ==
2009, Year of Us track listing
No.	Title	Lyrics	Music	Arrangement	Length
1.	"Y.O.U. (Year of Us)"	Young-hu Kim	Alex Cantrall; Don Sellers Jr.	Cantrall; Sellers	3:49
2.	"Ring Ding Dong"	Yoo Young-jin	Yoo	Yoo	3:52
3.	"JoJo"	Kenzie	Kenzie	Kenzie	3:38
4.	"Get Down" (Key & Minho) (featuring Luna)	Minho; Key; JQ (Makeumine Works); Bigtone; Ryan S. Jhun; Script Shepherd; Antwann Frost	Jhun; Solomon Cortes; Shepherd; Charley Paige	Cortes	3:03
5.	"Shinee Girl"	Park Joon-ha	Park	Park	3:16
6.	"The Name I Loved" (Korean: 내가 사랑했던 이름; RR: Naega saranghaetdeon ireum) (Onew featuring Kim Yeon-woo)	Lee Sung-soo	Lee	Lee	4:36
Total length:					22:18

== Charts ==
Chart performance for 2009, Year of Us
Chart (2010)	Peak position
Japanese Albums (Oricon)	40

== Release history ==
Release history and formats for 2009, Year of Us
Region	Date	Format	Label	Ref.
Various	October 19, 2009	Digital download; streaming	SM	
South Korea	October 22, 2009	CD	SM	
Taiwan	November 13, 2009	CD	Avex Taiwan	
Japan	January 20, 2010	CD	Rhythm Zone	
