= Lucifer (Shinee album) =

- Digital and A version cover

Studio album by Shinee
- Released: July 19, 2010
- Recorded: December 2009 – June 2010
- Studios: Booming Sound (Seoul); Mojo Sound (Seoul); Raoby Sound (Seoul); SM Blue Ocean (Seoul); SM Booming System (Seoul); SM Concert Hall (Seoul); SM Yellow Tail (Seoul)
- Genre: K-pop
- Length: 47:59
- Languages: Korean; English
- Labels: SM; Avex Trax

Shinee chronology
2009, Year of Us (2009)	Lucifer (2010)	The First (2011)

Singles from Lucifer
- 1. "Lucifer" Released: July 19, 2010

Alternative cover
- Repackage album cover as Hello

Singles from Hello
- 1. "Hello" Released: September 30, 2010

Lucifer is the second studio album by South Korean boy band Shinee, released on July 19, 2010, in South Korea. It features "Lucifer" as the lead single. It was re-released as Hello on October 4, 2010. The album is listed by Gaon Album Chart as the sixth best-selling album of 2010 in South Korea, with over 120,000 copies sold.

== Background and composition ==
Lucifer was Shinee's second studio album, coming two years into their career. It marked the first time they were given significant input in the creative direction of an album, from the music to the styling. Member Jonghyun commented, "The public's perception of idols is that we are 'made-up.' In this regard, our company gave us a lot of room [to give more input] during the making of this second album." The group, previously known for their youthful sound, adopted a more adult, "masculine" image as a result.

The album has been described as possessing an "electronica-inspired K-pop sound with a tinge of vintage '80s synth". Lead single "Lucifer" is a 1980s-inspired electronica song that compares a two-faced lover to the devil. "Electric Heart" features "soft, whispering vocals" laid over electronic beats and a guitar chorus. Key named the song his favourite on the album, citing its difference from the band's existing work. Member Onew made his debut as a lyricist on track 9, "Your Name", while Jonghyun contributed lyrics for the second time (after writing lyrics for "Juliette"). "Shout Out" was co-written by all of the members. "Love Still Goes On" is viewed as "kind of a sequel" to "Love Should Go On" from the group's debut mini-album Replay. Minho wrote the raps to "Up & Down", "Obsession", "Your Name", and co-wrote the songs "Wowowow" with JQ and "Shout Out" with the fellow members and Misfit. In the repackaged album Hello, he wrote the rap for the title track "Hello", and co-wrote the raps for "One" and "Get It".

"Ready or Not" was written and composed by Will Simms, a French music producer who made his debut in SM Entertainment with this song. Risto Asikainen and Setä Tamu also contributed to the song and Misfit penned the lyrics.

== Release and reception ==
Teaser images of the band's members were released online from July 8 to July 12. A highlight medley containing snippets of the album tracks was also posted on Shinee's official website on July 15, showcasing the variety of genres. The album was released on July 19, and within hours, topped various physical and digital sales charts in South Korea. The songs on the album "were more carefully selected than ever", and the album itself is said to "[give] listeners a great chance to experience the diverse musical characters and more mature vocal skills of the members".

"Lucifer" was choreographed by Rino Nakasone, who choreographed Shinee's early songs like "Replay" in 2008. For its choreography, "Lucifer" was nominated for the Best Dance Performance Award at the Mnet Asian Music Awards in 2010. Lucifer also became the sixth best-selling album of 2010 in South Korea, selling over 120,000 copies. In the US, the single "Lucifer" charted on Billboard's World Digital Song Sales chart for 57 weeks.

Shinee released a repackaged album of Lucifer called Hello on October 4, 2010. The lead single, also titled "Hello", was released a few days earlier on September 30. The repackaged album Hello sold 63,118 copies in 2010 according to the Korean sales chart Gaon.

On November 26, 2010, the track "Obsession" was announced as the theme song for the film, The Warrior's Way. The lead single "Lucifer" was also featured on the January 29, 2018 episode of Fox's popular TV series, Lucifer.

== Track listing ==
Lucifer – Standard edition
No.	Title	Lyrics	Music	Arrangement	Length
1.	"Up & Down"	Misfit; Jonghyun	Carl Seanté McGrier II (wiidope); Kofi Owusu-Ofori (wiidope); Kyuwon "Q" Kim (wiidope)	wiidope	3:33
2.	"Lucifer"	Yoo Young-jin	Bebe Rexha; Ryan S. Jhun; Yoo; Adam Kapit	Rexha; Jhun; Kapit	3:54
3.	"Electric Heart"	Kim Boo-min	Hitchhiker	Hitchhiker	3:19
4.	"A-Yo"	Ha Jung-hyun	iDR (C2); 12Keyz (C2); Erin Reid	C2; Reid	4:27
5.	"Obsession" (Korean: 욕; Hanja: 慾; RR: Yok)	Jonghyun; Minho	John Ho; Sean Alexander (Avenue 52); Jimmy Burney	Ho	4:08
6.	"Quasimodo" (Korean: 화살; RR: Hwasal; lit. 'Arrow')	Jo In-hyung	Michael Lee	Michael Lee	4:08
7.	"Shout Out" (Korean: 악; RR: Ak)	JQ (Makeumine Works); Shinee; Misfit	Steven Lee; Drew Ryan Scott; Sean Alexander (Avenue 52)	Steven Lee	2:53
8.	"Wowowow"	Kim Jin-hee; Minho; JQ	Will Simms; Emma Stevens	Simms; Stevens	3:11
9.	"Your Name"	Onew; Minho	Brandon Fraley	Fraley	4:06
10.	"Life"	Kim Jeong-bae	Kenzie	Kenzie	4:38
11.	"Ready or Not"	Misfit	Mikko Tamminen; Risto Asikainen; Simms	Tamminen; Asikainen; Simms	3:03
12.	"Love Pain"	Tesung Kim (Iconic Sounds)	Tesung Kim; Noday	Tesung Kim; Noday	3:43
13.	"Love Still Goes On" (Korean: 사.계.후; RR: Sa.Gye.Hu)	Lee Yoon-jae; JQ	Lee Yoon-jae	Rado	2:56
Total length:					47:59

Hello – Repackage edition
No.	Title	Lyrics	Music	Arrangement	Length
1.	"Lucifer"	Yoo; Rexha	Rexha; Jhun; Yoo; Kapit	Rexha; Jhun; Kapit	3:54
2.	"Hello"	Kim Eana; Minho	Tim "Data" McEwan; Jess Cates; Lars Halvor Jensen	Park Bum-geum	3:04
3.	"One" (Korean: 하나; RR: Hana)	Park Sung-soo; Minho	Park Sung-soo	Park Sung-soo; Loomboy; NG.K	3:34
4.	"Get It"	Ceejay (Fresh Boys); Gilme; Minho; Key	Nicolas Scapa; J Read Fasse; Jhun; iDR; 12Keyz	Jhun; Remedios; 12Keyz	3:23
5.	"Up & Down"	Misfit; Jonghyun	McGrier; Owusu-Ofori; Kyuwon "Q" Kim	wiidope	3:33
6.	"Electric Heart"	Kim Boo-min	Hitchhiker	Hitchhiker	3:19
7.	"A-Yo"	Ha	iDR; 12Keyz; Reid	C2; Reid	4:27
8.	"Obsession" (Korean: 욕; Hanja: 慾; RR: Yok)	Jonghyun; Minho	Ho; Alexander; Burney	Ho	4:08
9.	"Quasimodo" (Korean: 화살; RR: Hwasal; lit. 'Arrow')	Jo	Michael Lee	Michael Lee	4:08
10.	"Shout Out" (Korean: 악; RR: Ak)	JQ; Shinee; Misfit	Steven Lee; Scott; Alexander	Steven Lee	2:53
11.	"Wowowow"	Kim Jin-hee; Minho; JQ	Simms; Stevens	Simms; Stevens	3:11
12.	"Your Name"	Onew; Minho	Fraley	Fraley	4:06
13.	"Life"	Kim Jeong-bae	Kenzie	Kenzie	4:38
14.	"Ready or Not"	Misfit	Tamminen; Asikainen; Simms	Tamminen; Asikainen; Simms	3:03
15.	"Love Pain"	Tesung Kim	Tesung Kim; Noday	Tesung Kim; Noday	3:43
16.	"Love Still Goes On" (Korean: 사.계.후; RR: Sa.Gye.Hu)	Lee Yoon-jae; JQ	Lee Yoon-jae	Rado	2:56
Total length:					57:53

== Charts ==
=== Weekly charts ===
Weekly chart performance for Lucifer and Hello
Chart (2010)	Peak position	
Chart (2010)	Lucifer	Hello
Japanese Albums (Oricon)	14	—
South Korean Albums (Gaon)	1	1

=== Monthly charts ===
Monthly chart performance for Lucifer and Hello
Chart (2010)	Peak position	
Chart (2010)	Lucifer	Hello
South Korean Albums (Gaon)	1	5

=== Year-end charts ===
Year-end chart performance for Lucifer and Hello
Chart (2010)	Position	
Chart (2010)	Lucifer	Hello
South Korean Albums (Gaon)	6	17

== Certifications and sales ==
Chart	Album	Total
Gaon physical sales	Lucifer	255,276
Gaon physical sales	Hello	255,276

== Accolades ==
Awards and nominations for Lucifer
Ceremony	Year	Category	Result	Ref.
Golden Disc Awards	2010	Album Bonsang	Won	
Golden Disc Awards	2010	Album Daesang	Nominated	

Music program awards
Song	Program	Date	Ref.
"Lucifer"	Music Bank	July 30, 2010	
"Lucifer"	Music Bank	August 6, 2010	
"Lucifer"	Inkigayo	August 8, 2010	
"Lucifer"	Inkigayo	August 15, 2010	
"Hello"	Music Bank	October 15, 2010	
"Hello"	Inkigayo	October 17, 2010	

== Release history ==
=== Lucifer ===
Release dates and formats for Lucifer
Region	Date	Version	Format(s)	Label(s)
South Korea	July 19, 2010	A	CD	SM Entertainment
Hong Kong	August 13, 2010	A	CD	Avex Asia
Taiwan	August 13, 2010	A	CD	Avex Asia
Philippines	September 18, 2010 (special release); September 24, 2010 (official release)	A	CD	Universal Records
South Korea	July 28, 2010	B	CD	SM Entertainment
Hong Kong	August 18, 2010	B	CD	Avex Asia
Philippines	September 18, 2010 (special release); September 24, 2010 (official release)	B	CD	Universal Records
Japan	September 15, 2010	Japanese Version	CD+DVD	Avex Trax, Rhythm Zone

=== Hello ===
Release dates and formats for Hello
Region	Date	Format(s)	Label(s)
South Korea	October 4, 2010	CD	SM Entertainment
Hong Kong	2010	CD	Avex Asia
Taiwan	2010	CD+DVD	Avex Asia
Philippines	November 27, 2010 (special release); December 3, 2010 (official release)	CD	Universal Records
Japan	March 2011	CD+DVD	EMI Music Japan
