= Nu ABO =

- Digital cover

EP by f(x)
- Released: May 4, 2010
- Recorded: 2009–2010
- Studios: SM Studios, Seoul
- Genres: Pop; hip-hop; electronic; electropop
- Length: 19:34
- Language: Korean
- Labels: SM; Avex Asia; Universal

F(x) chronology
Nu ABO (2010)	Pinocchio (2011)

Singles from Nu ABO
- 1. "Nu ABO" Released: May 3, 2010

Nu ABO (Korean: Nu 예삐오; Nu Yeppioh) is the debut extended play by South Korean girl group f(x). It was released on May 4, 2010, in South Korea under the record label of SM Entertainment and distribution label of KMP Holdings. The extended play spawned the title track of the same name. Commercially, the EP peaked at number two on the Gaon Album Chart and sold over 54,000 copies by 2016.

== Background ==
The title is a play on words meaning "New Blood Type": A, B and O are blood types, and if the letters are said in succession, it sounds like "ye-bbi-oh" ("예삐오").

== Promotions ==
The title track from the EP, "Nu ABO", was chosen as the lead single. "Mr. Boogie" was re-released as a digital single on July 17, 2010 for follow-up promotions. Live performances of both "Nu ABO" and "Mr. Boogie" were broadcast on various local music shows Music Bank, Show! Music Core and Inkigayo during the promotional cycle. "Me+U" was also performed during the 2010 Dream Concert and on Wave K with its own choreography. A remix version of "Ice Cream" by Idiotape was also released on March 27, 2013. The title track was also used for the Korean-American film Make Your Move (2013), and was subsequently included on its soundtrack.

== Commercial performance ==
The extended play debuted and peaked at number 2 on the Gaon Album Chart for the week ending May 8, 2010. In its second week the album fell to number 19 and to number 21 in its third week. The album rose to number 13 in its fourth week. The extended play was the 8th best-selling album in May 2010 in South Korea. It was the 53rd best-selling album in the country during 2010, with 27,281 copies sold.

== Critical reception ==
The single "Nu ABO" was ranked amongst the best K-pop songs of all time by Spin at number 12, Music Y at number 87, and Melon at number 45. Stereogum included it in their 2012 list of The 20 Best K-pop Videos at number 16. It was named one of the best female idol songs since 1996 by The Dong-a Ilbo at number 5.

== Track listing ==
No.	Title	Lyrics	Music	Arrangement	Length
1.	"Nu ABO" (Nu 예삐오; Nu Yeppioh)	Yoo Young-jin	Mich Hansen; Jose "Mynority" Aguirre Lopez; Thomas Troelsen; Engelina Larsen; Yoo Young-jin	Cutfather; Mynority; Thomas Troelsen	3:44
2.	"Mr. Boogie"	Kenzie	Fredrik Fencke; Emilh Tigerlantz	Fredrik Fencke; Emilh Tigerlantz	3:00
3.	"Ice Cream" (아이스크림)	Kim Bu-min	Hitchhiker	Hitchhiker	3:06
4.	"Me+U"	Young-hu Kim	Cho Hun-young	Cho Hun-young	3:16
5.	"Surprise Party"	Shim Eun-ji	Shim Eun-ji	Shim Eun-ji	2:43
6.	"Sorry (Dear Daddy)" (Luna and Krystal duet)	Kim Hee-young	Shim Eun-ji; Lee Min-young	Shim Eun-ji; Lee Min-young	3:41

== Charts ==
=== Weekly charts ===
Chart (2010)	Peak position
South Korean Albums (Gaon)	2

=== Year-end charts ===
Chart (2010)	Position
South Korean Albums (Gaon)	53

== Release history ==
Country	Date	Format	Distributing label	Ref.
South Korea	May 4, 2010	CD; digital download	SM Entertainment; KMP Holdings	
Hong Kong	May 18, 2010	CD	Avex Asia	
Taiwan	May 28, 2010	CD	Avex Asia	
Philippines	June 25, 2010	CD	Universal Records	
