= Romeo (EP) =

- Regular cover

EP by Shinee
- Released: May 25, 2009
- Studios: Coo (Seoul); SM Blue Ocean (Seoul); SM Concert Hall (Seoul); SM Yellow Tail (Seoul); XP (Seoul); T (Seoul); Vound (Seoul)
- Genre: K-pop
- Length: 23:14
- Languages: Korean; English
- Label: SM

Shinee chronology
The Shinee World (2008)	Romeo (2009)	2009, Year of Us (2009)

Singles from Romeo
- 1. "Juliette" Released: May 18, 2009

Romeo (Korean: 로미오) is the second extended play (EP) by South Korean boy group Shinee. It was released on May 25, 2009, in South Korea, under SM Entertainment. The EP consists of six tracks, including the lead single, "Juliette", and was Shinee's first Korean release after a seven-month hiatus. On August 29, 2011, a Japanese version of "Juliette" was released as Shinee's second Japanese single with the original Japanese song "Kiss Kiss Kiss" as a B-side. The release peaked at number three on the weekly Oricon chart.

The album was commercially successful in South Korea—it topped the Hanteo Album Chart for three consecutive weeks. However, there are no known cumulative chart records for albums sold in 2009. Prior to the establishment of the Gaon Music Chart in 2010, South Korea's music charts were supplied by the Music Industry Association of Korea (MIAK), which stopped compiling data in 2008. According to Gaon, the EP has sold over 20,000 copies since 2011.

== Background and release ==
Romeo was Shinee's first Korean release since the reissue Amigo on October 31, 2008. The EP was originally scheduled for release on May 21 but was delayed to May 25 due to Onew damaging his teeth. The choreography for the title song is the work of Rino Nakasone, who also choreographed previous Shinee songs such as "Replay" and "Love Like Oxygen". The lead single "Juliette" is a remake of "Deal with It" by Jay Sean and Corbin Bleu. Executives at SM Entertainment bought the rights to the song from Hollywood Records. The song was slightly re-arranged by Cutfather and, as the original song's lyrics were not purchased, the Korean lyrics were penned by Shinee members Jonghyun and Minho. On May 22, the group started their official promotions and performed the title song for the first time on Music Bank. The Korean music video was released on May 22 and features f(x)'s Krystal as the female lead, while the song's Japanese music video features actress Go Ara. The Korean music video was shot in early May in Seoul and Ilsanseo-gu and was directed by Lee Sang-kyu.

== Concept and composition ==
"We want to showcase music that is colourful and yet full of personality, and a group that leads the trend and brings to everyone many different unique sides."

— Jonghyun about the group's new album.

The album concept was inspired by William Shakespeare's tragedy Romeo and Juliet. The band members portray the Romeo of the 21st century, confessing their love to their Juliet. The album consists of six tracks, and songwriters such as Kenzie, Young-hu Kim, Jung Yeop and Eco Bridge participated in their composition. Two of the six songs are named after Romeo and Juliet—the title song "Juliette" and the last track on the album, "Romeo + Juliette". The title track, which is described as an urban dance song with "sophisticated" rhythm and acoustic drums, is written by Jonghyun, who took on the job of writing lyrics for the first time since debut. He stated that after listening to the demo of the title track he went to look for a romance story that "will make everyone interested but also a story which everyone can identify with" and was inspired by the classic movie Romeo and Juliet.

SM's creative director Min Hee-jin, who had worked with the group since the beginning, called Romeo a turning point for the group, visually as well as musically, saying, "The visualisation of the album reflected their identity the best. I aimed to put the group's signature colour (pearl aqua) on the map, as well as each member's individual style." In the music video for the title song "Juliette", the members wear bright clothes and clashing accessories to accentuate their youthfulness.

== Track listing ==
Romeo track listing
No.	Title	Lyrics	Music	Arrangement	Length
1.	"Talk to You" (니가 맘에 들어; Niga mame deureo; 'I Like You')	Tesung Kim (Iconic Sounds)	Carol Borjas	Borjas	3:27
2.	"Juliette" (줄리엣)	Jonghyun; Minho	Mikkel Remee Sigvardt; Jay Sean; Mich Hansen; Joseph Belmaati	Cho Yong-hoon; Jeon Hong-sung	3:25
3.	"Hit Me" (차라리 때려; Charari ttaeryeo; 'Might as Well Just Hit Me')	Young-hu Kim	Borjas	Borjas	3:56
4.	"Señorita" (세뇨리따)	Kim Jeong-bae	Kenzie	Kenzie	3:32
5.	"Please, Don't Go" (잠꼬대; Jamkkodae; 'Sleep Talking') (Jonghyun & Onew)	Jungyup	Jungyup; Eco Bridge	Eco Bridge	4:10
6.	"Romeo + Juliette" (소년, 소녀를 만나다; Sonyeon, sonyeoreul mannada; 'Boy Meets Girl')	Lee Sung-soo	Lee	Lee; Jeon	4:44
Total length:					23:14

== Accolades ==
Music program awards
Song	Program	Date	Ref.
"Juliette"	Music Bank	June 5, 2009	
"Juliette"	Music Bank	June 19, 2009	
"Juliette"	Inkigayo	June 28, 2009	
"Juliette"	Inkigayo	July 5, 2009	

== Release history ==
Release dates and formats for Romeo
Region	Date	Format	Label	Ref.
South Korea	May 25, 2009	CD; digital download	SM	
Taiwan	June 28, 2009	CD	Avex	
Japan	July 29, 2009	CD+DVD	Rhythm Zone	
