= Lucifer (Shinee song) =

- Japanese Digital/regular cover

Single by Shinee

from the album Lucifer and The First
- Language: Korean; Japanese
- B-side: "Love Like Oxygen" (Japanese Version)
- Released: July 19, 2010
- Studio: SM Booming System (Seoul)
- Genre: Electronic
- Length: 3:53
- Label: SM
- Composers: Bebe Rexha; Adam Kapit; Ryan S. Jhun; Yoo Young-jin
- Lyricist: Yoo Young-jin

Shinee singles chronology
| "Fly High" (2010) | "Lucifer" (2010) | "Hello" (2010) |

Music video
- "Lucifer" on YouTube

"Lucifer" is a song by South Korean boy band Shinee. It was released on July 19, 2010, through SM Entertainment and served as the lead single for the album of the same name. An electronic song, "Lucifer" was composed and arranged by Yoo Young-jin, Ryan S. Jhun, Adam Kapit and Bebe Rexha, with lyrics penned by Yoo. The song was commercially successful, peaking at number two on the Gaon Digital Chart and selling over one million downloads in South Korea in 2010.

== Composition ==
"Lucifer" is a 1980s-inspired electronic song with synthesizer effects. SM Entertainment described it as "urban electronica", while music critics have characterised it as dance, electropop and Europop. It is considered an example of SM's characteristic music style, SMP (SM music performance), and has been labelled "rougher and edgier" than Shinee's previous work. The lyrics compare a two-faced lover to the devil, and contain lines such as "Her whisper is the Lucifer" and the "militaristic" refrain of "loverholic, robotronic".

== Release and promotion ==
"Lucifer" came nine months after Shinee's 2009 single "Ring Ding Dong", serving as the lead single for their second studio album. Ahead of its release, teaser images of each member were released sequentially through Shinee's official website from July 8 to July 12. Shinee were originally scheduled to hold their first performance of the song on Music Bank on July 16; however, it was postponed by a week due to a leg injury Minho sustained while filming the variety show Let's Go! Dream Team Season 2. The song was released alongside the album on July 19, with the music video premiering the following day. Shinee promoted the song with performances on various music programs, starting with Music Bank on July 23. Minho was unable to participate in the choreography due to his injury.

A Japanese version of "Lucifer" was released on October 12, 2011, with the Japanese version of "Love Like Oxygen" as a B-side. It was later included on Shinee's first Japanese studio album, The First.

== Critical reception ==
"Lucifer" has received mostly positive reviews from music critics, with some exceptions. Writing for GQ, Taylor Glasby called it a "classic single", and highlighted the lack of vocal processing that was a feature of many K-pop songs at the time. On the other hand, IZM's Lee Jong-min was critical of the departure from Shinee's fresh sound, previously found in songs like "Replay", and felt that it veered too close to the typical SM boy group style. Tamar Herman of Billboard praised the song's "forceful charisma", describing it as a "game-changing tune" that is one of Shinee's "most dynamic pieces". The publication listed it among the best boy group songs of all time and best K-pop songs of the 2010s. Spin named it one of the greatest K-pop songs of all time, with staff writer David Bevan calling it "a total romp".

"Lucifer" on critic lists
| Publication | List | Rank | Ref. |
|---|---|---|---|
| Billboard | The 100 Greatest Boy Band Songs of All Time | 67 | |
| Billboard | The 100 Greatest K-Pop Songs of the 2010s | 47 | |
| GQ | The Game-Changers From a Decade of K-Pop | —N/a | |
| Rolling Stone | The 100 Greatest Songs in the History of Korean Pop Music | 16 | |
| Spin | The 21 Greatest K-Pop Songs Of All Time | 20 | |
| Stereogum | The 20 Best K-Pop Videos | 20 | |

== Accolades ==
Awards and nominations for "Lucifer"
| Ceremony | Year | Category | Result | Ref. |
|---|---|---|---|---|
| Melon Music Awards | 2010 | Netizen Popularity Award | Nominated | |
| Mnet Asian Music Awards | 2010 | Best Dance Performance – Male Group | Nominated | |
| MTV Video Music Awards Japan | 2012 | Best Choreography | Nominated | |

Music program awards for "Lucifer"
| Program | Date | Ref. |
|---|---|---|
| Music Bank | July 30, 2010 | |
| Music Bank | August 6, 2010 | |
| Inkigayo | August 8, 2010 | |
| Inkigayo | August 15, 2010 | |

== Commercial performance ==
"Lucifer" debuted at number two on the weekly Gaon Digital Chart. It recorded 1,431,431 downloads in South Korea in 2010 and ranked number 60 on the year-end Gaon Digital Chart. It also peaked at number three on Billboard World Digital Song Sales and charted for fifty-seven weeks. "Lucifer" is Shinee's best-selling song in the United States, with over 67,000 downloads sold, as of 2017. The Japanese version ranked second on the Oricon Singles Chart, selling approximately 50,000 copies in the first week. It was Shinee's third single to enter the top three, following "Replay (Kimi wa Boku no Everything)" and "Juliette", making Shinee the first foreign artist to reach the top three with each of their first three singles.

== Music video ==
The music video for "Lucifer" was directed by Cho Soo-hyun and filmed in Namyangju in early July 2010. A teaser video was released on July 16, filmed using bullet time, followed by the music video on July 20. The music video was noted for showing a more mature image compared to Shinee's previous youthful concepts. The members sport "haircuts that seem like they leaped straight from a William Gibson novel". The choreography has a strong emphasis on isolations and was the work of Rino Nakasone and Shim Jae-won. It has received nominations from the Mnet Asian Music Awards and the MTV Video Music Awards Japan.

== Credits and personnel ==
Credits adapted from the liner notes of Lucifer.

Studio

- Recorded and mixed at SM Booming System
- Mastered at Sonic Korea

Personnel

- Shinee – vocals
- Yoo Young-jin – lyrics, composition, arrangement, vocal directing, background vocals, recording, mixing
- Ryan S. Jhun – composition, arrangement
- Adam Kapit – composition, arrangement
- Bebe Rexha – composition, arrangement
- Jeon Hoon – mastering

== Charts ==
=== Korean version ===
Chart performance for "Lucifer"
| Chart (2010) | Peak position |
|---|---|
| South Korea (Gaon) | 2 |
| US World Digital Song Sales (Billboard) | 3 |

=== Japanese version ===
Chart performance for "Lucifer" (Japanese ver.)
| Chart (2011) | Peak position |
|---|---|
| Japan (Japan Hot 100) | 4 |
| Japan (Oricon) | 2 |

== Release history ==
Release dates and formats for "Lucifer"
| Region | Date | Format | Version | Label | Ref. |
|---|---|---|---|---|---|
| South Korea | July 19, 2010 | Digital download | Original | SM | |
| Japan | October 12, 2011 | CD; DVD | Japanese | EMI | |
