= MTV Video Music Award Japan for Best Choreography =

Annual Japanese music award

Best Choreography (最優秀振付け賞)

== Results ==
The following table displays the nominees and the winners in bold print with a yellow background.

=== 2010s ===
Year	Artist	Video	Choreographer
**2012** (11th)	**Perfume**	**"Laser Beam (レーザービーム)"**	**Mikiko**
**2012** (11th)	Beyoncé	"Run the World (Girls)"	Frank Gatson, Sheryl Murakami and Jeffrey Page
**2012** (11th)	Chris Brown	"Yeah 3x"	
**2012** (11th)	LMFAO	"Party Rock Anthem"	Hokuto Konishi
**2012** (11th)	Shinee	"Lucifer"	Rino Okinawa and Jaewon Dancing
**2013** (12th)	Chris Brown	"Turn Up the Music"	Anwar "Flii" Burton
**2013** (12th)	Momoiro Clover Z	"Saraba, Itoshiki Kanashimitachi yo" (サラバ、愛しき悲しみたちよ)	
**2013** (12th)	Pink	"Try"	The Golden Boyz
**2013** (12th)	Willy Moon	"Yeah Yeah"	Olivier Casamayou and Carine Charaire
**2013** (12th)	WORLD ORDER	"Permanent Revolution"	WORLD ORDER

== See also ==
- MTV Video Music Award for Best Choreography
