= 25th Golden Disc Awards =

2010 South Korean music awards ceremony

- Official poster for the 25th Golden Disc Awards
- Date: December 9, 2010
- Location: Korea University, Seoul
- Country: South Korea
- Hosted by: Tak Jae-hoon; Choi Song-hyun
- Website: goldendisc.co.kr

The 25th Golden Disc Awards were held December 9, 2010. They recognized accomplishments by musicians from the previous year.

== Presenters ==
- Joo Sang-wook
- Lee Tae-im
- Lee Young-ah
- Yoon Shi-yoon
- Song Chang-eui
- Seo Ji-hye
- Min Hyo-rin
- Lee Si-young
- Lee Chae-young
- Park Min-young
- Nam Gyu-ri
- Lee Yeon-hee
- Yoo Ah-in

== Winners and nominees ==
=== Main awards ===
Winners and nominees are listed in alphabetical order. Winners are listed first and emphasized in bold.

Digital Daesang (Song of the Year)	Disc Daesang (Album of the Year)
**2AM – "Can't Let You Go Even If I Die"**; CNBLUE – "I'm a Loner"; IU – "Nagging" (with Lim Seul-ong); Lee Seung-gi – "Love Taught Me To Drink"; Miss A – "Bad Girl Good Girl"	**Girls' Generation – Oh!**; BoA – Hurricane Venus; DJ DOC – Pungnyu; Shinee – Lucifer; Super Junior – Bonamana
Digital Song Bonsang	Album Bonsang
**2AM** **– "Can't Let You Go Even If I Die"**; **CNBLUE – "I'm a Loner"**; **IU – "Nagging" (with Lim Seul-ong)**; **Lee Seung-gi – "Love Taught Me To Drink"**; **Miss A – "Bad Girl Good Girl"**; 2PM – "I'll Be Back"; 4Men – "I Can't"; Davichi – "Please Stop Time"; DJ DOC – "I'm this kind of Guy"; Gain – "Irresistable"; Girls' Generation – "Run Devil Run"; Girls' Generation – "Oh!"; Hot Potato – "Confession"; Kara – "Lupin"; MC Mong – "Sick Enough to Die"; Psy – "Right Now"; Rain – "Love Song"; SG Wannabe – "Sunflower"; T-ara – "Bo Peep Bo Peep"; Wonder Girls – "Two Different Tears"; Yesung – "It Has To Be You"; Zia – "Just Laugh"	**BoA – Hurricane Venus**; **DJ DOC – Pungnyu**; **Girls' Generation – Oh!**; **Shinee – Lucifer**; **Super Junior – Bonamana**; 2NE1 – To Anyone; Bobby Kim – Heart & Soul; Epik High – Epilogue; K.Will – Missing You; Kim Jong-kook – Eleventh Story; Lee Juck – Love; Lee Seung-hwan – Dreamizer; Lucid Fall – Les Miserables; Supreme Team – Supremier; T-ara – Breaking Heart; Taeyang – Solar; U-KISS – Only One; Verandah Project – Day Off; Vibe – Vibe in Praha; Younha – Part B: Growing Season
Best Hip Hop Award	Best Rock Award
**Supreme Team** **– "Dang Dang Dang"**; DJ DOC - "I'm A Guy Who Lived Like This"; Eun Ji-won - "Siren"; MC Mong - "Sick Enough to Die"; Outsider - "Acquaintance"	**F.T. Island – "Love Love Love"**; CNBLUE - "I'm A Loner"; Come Back Madonna Band - "Comeback Madonna"; Hot Potato - "Confession"; Namgyeok Band - "I love you, I love you"
Best New Artist Award	Popular Artist Award
**Beast** **– "Shock"**; **Secret** **– "Magic"**; **Sistar – "Push Push"**; CNBLUE - "I'm A Loner"; G.NA - "I'll Back Off So You Can Live Better"; Gil Hak-mi - "Super Soul"; Miss A - "Bad Girl Good Girl"; Seo In-guk - "Love U"; Supreme Team - "Dang Dang Dang"; ZE:A - "Mazeltov"	**Girls' Generation – "Run Devil Run"**; **Shinee – "Lucifer"**; **Super Junior – "Bonamana"**

=== Other awards ===
- Lifetime Achievement Award: Park Choon-seok (composer)
- Record Producer of the Year: Hong Seung-sung (Cube Entertainment)

== Gallery ==
Award ceremony gallery

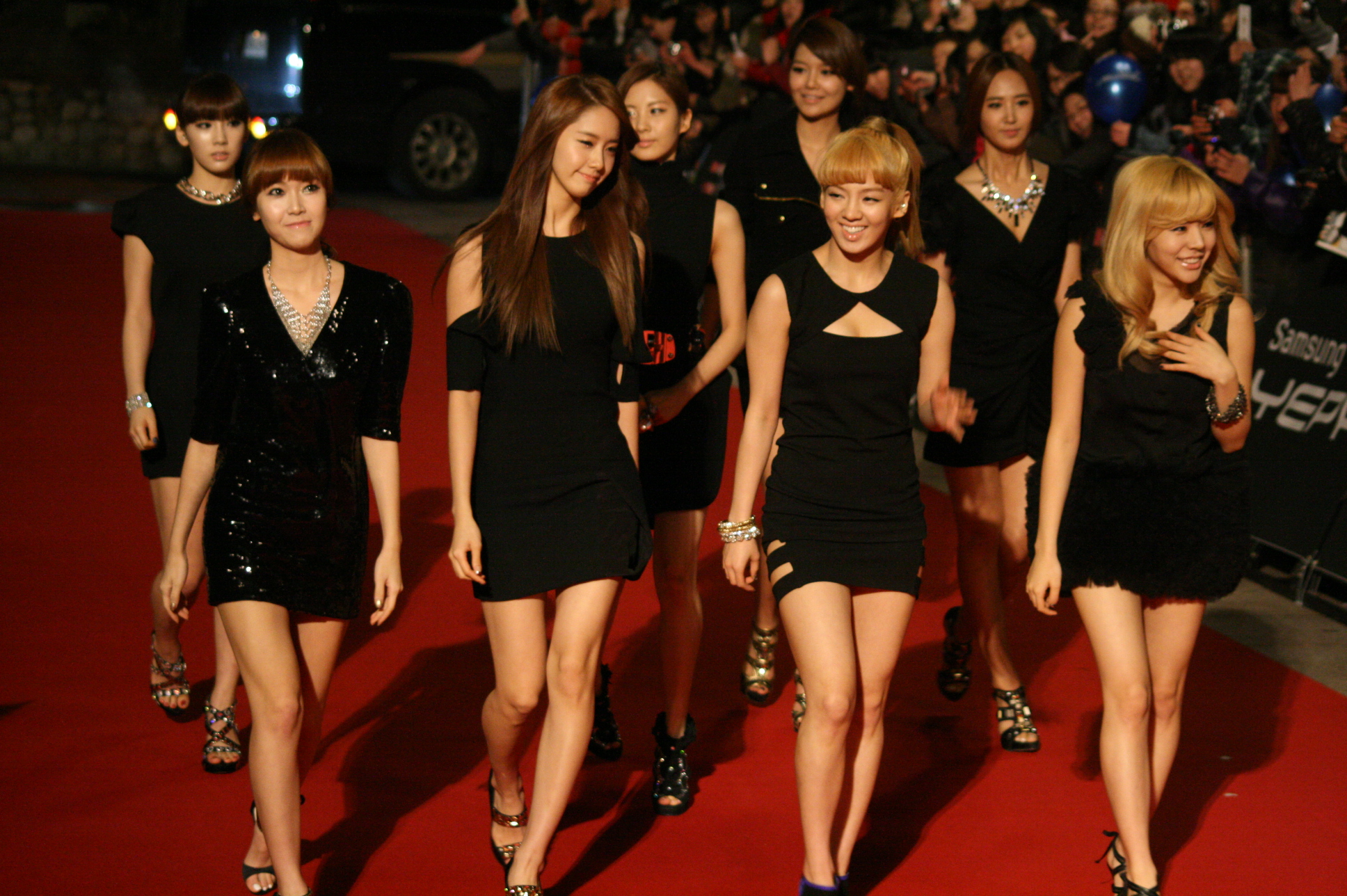
Girls' Generation

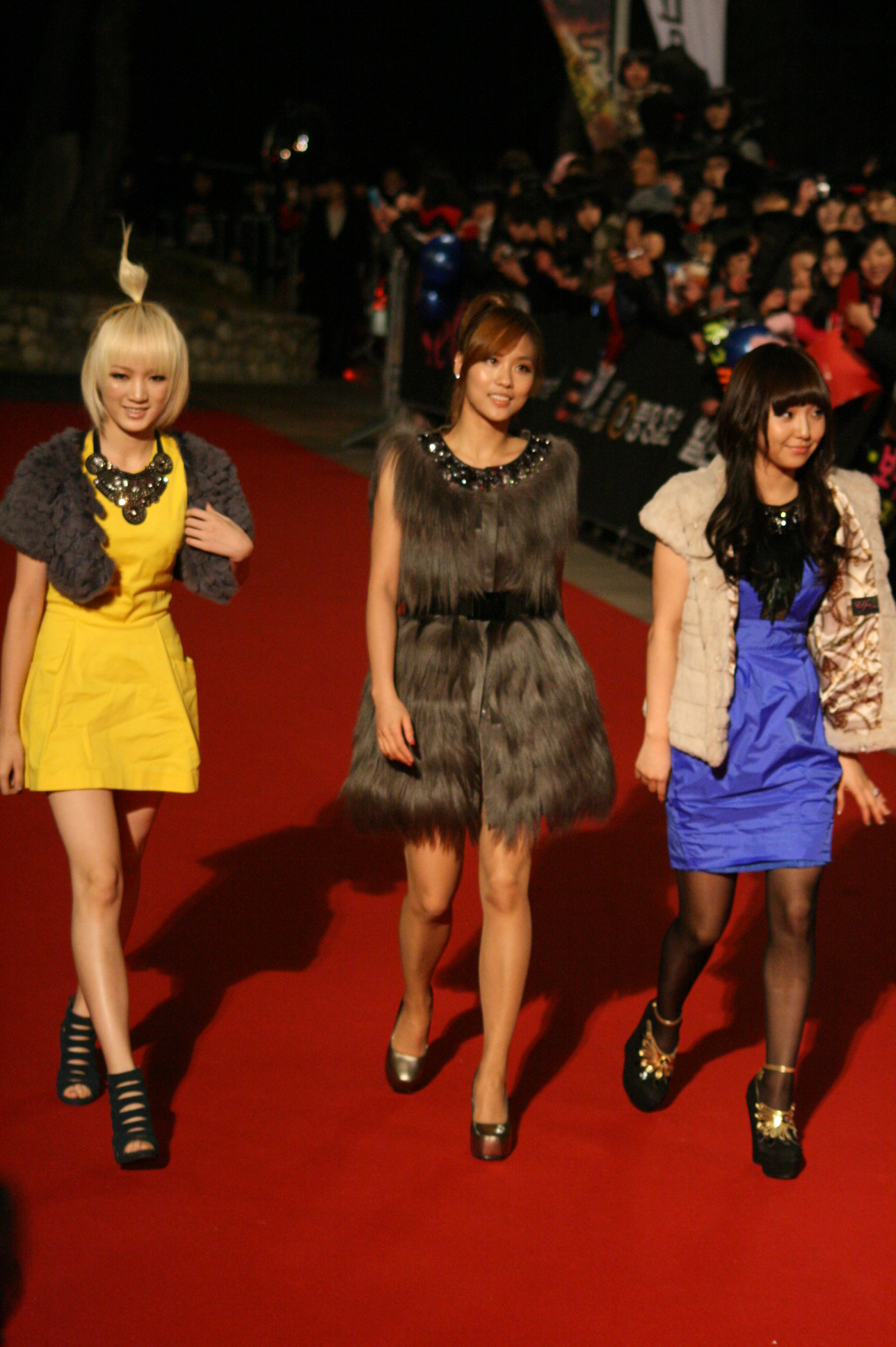
Miss A

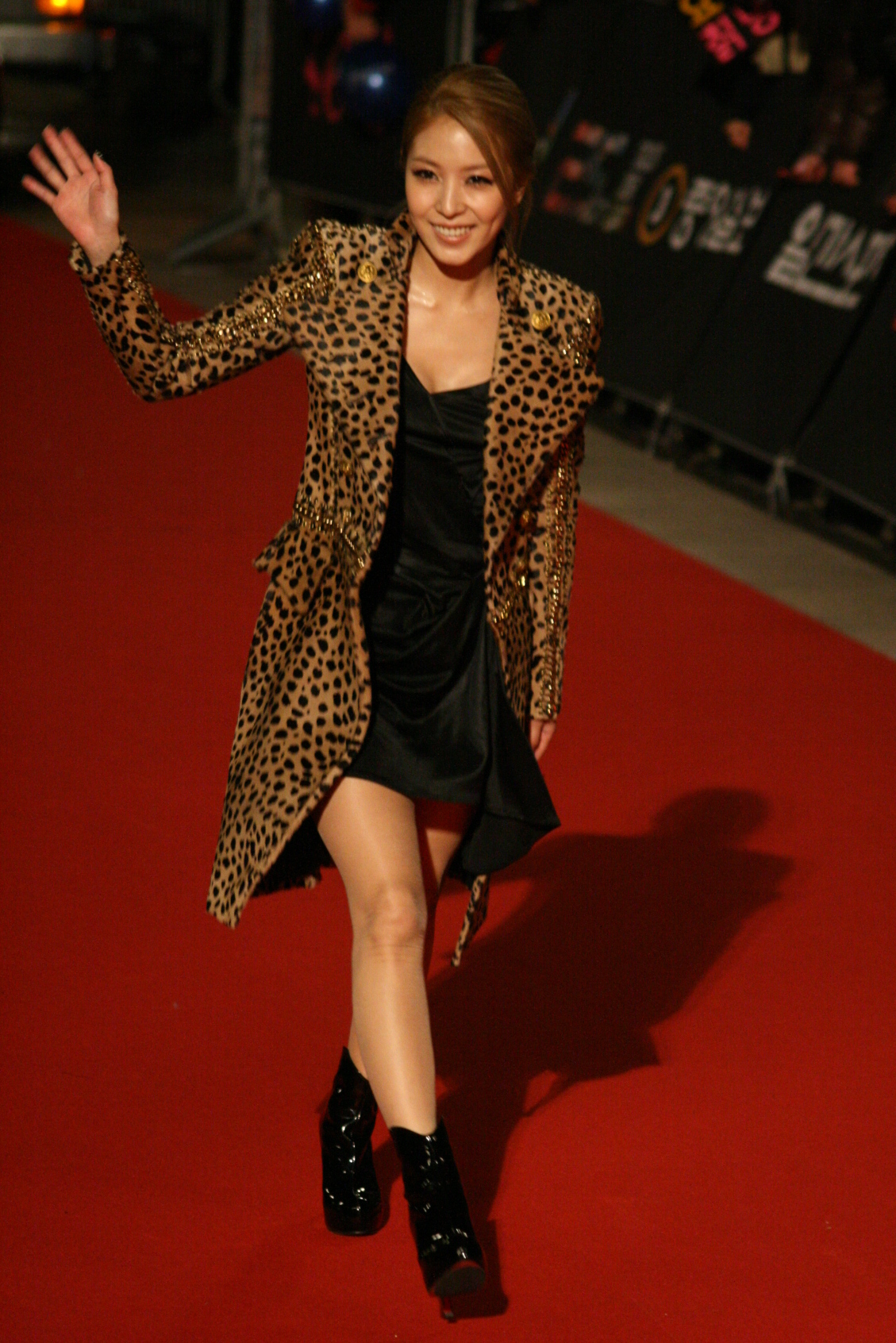
BoA

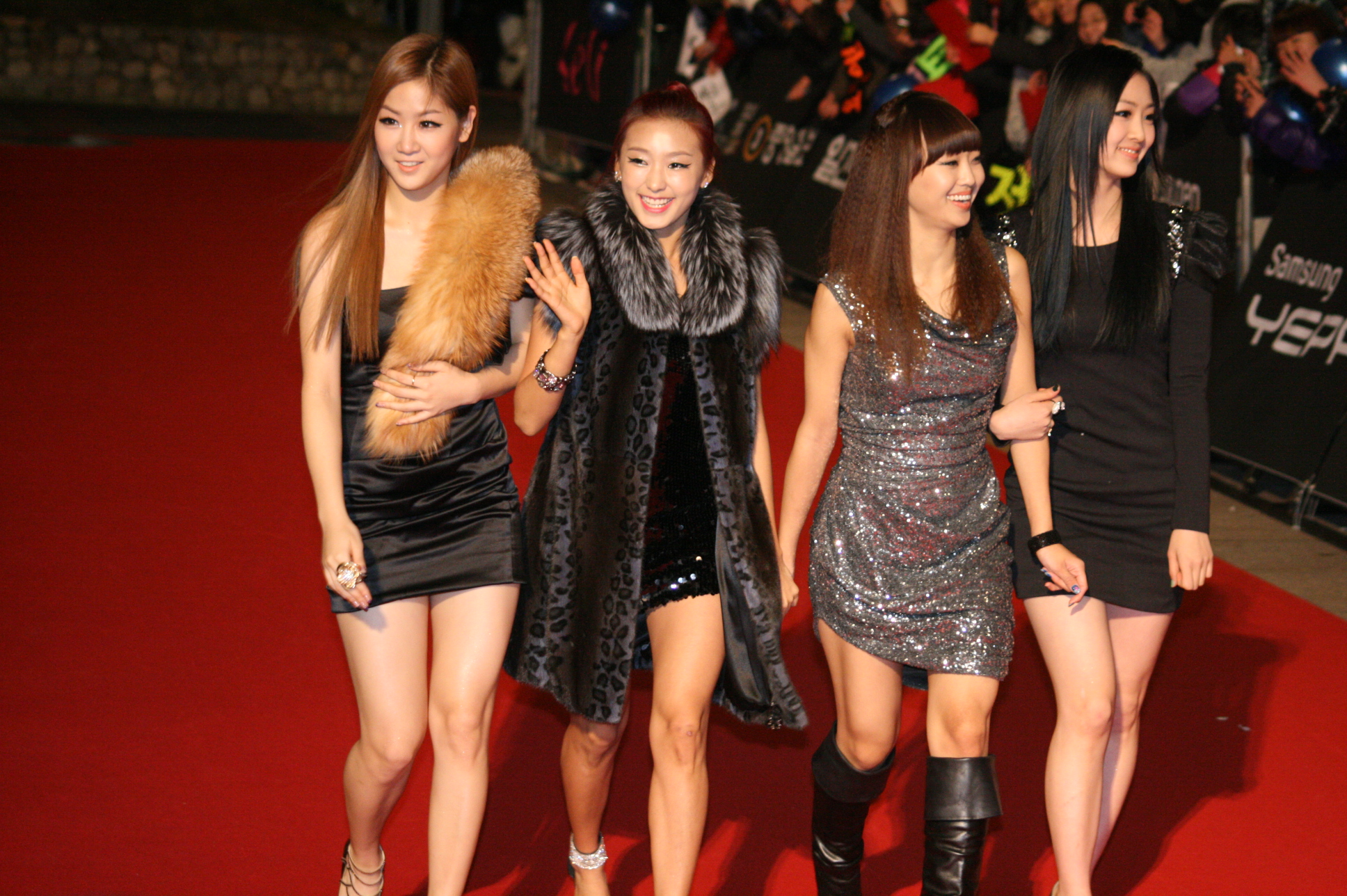
Sistar

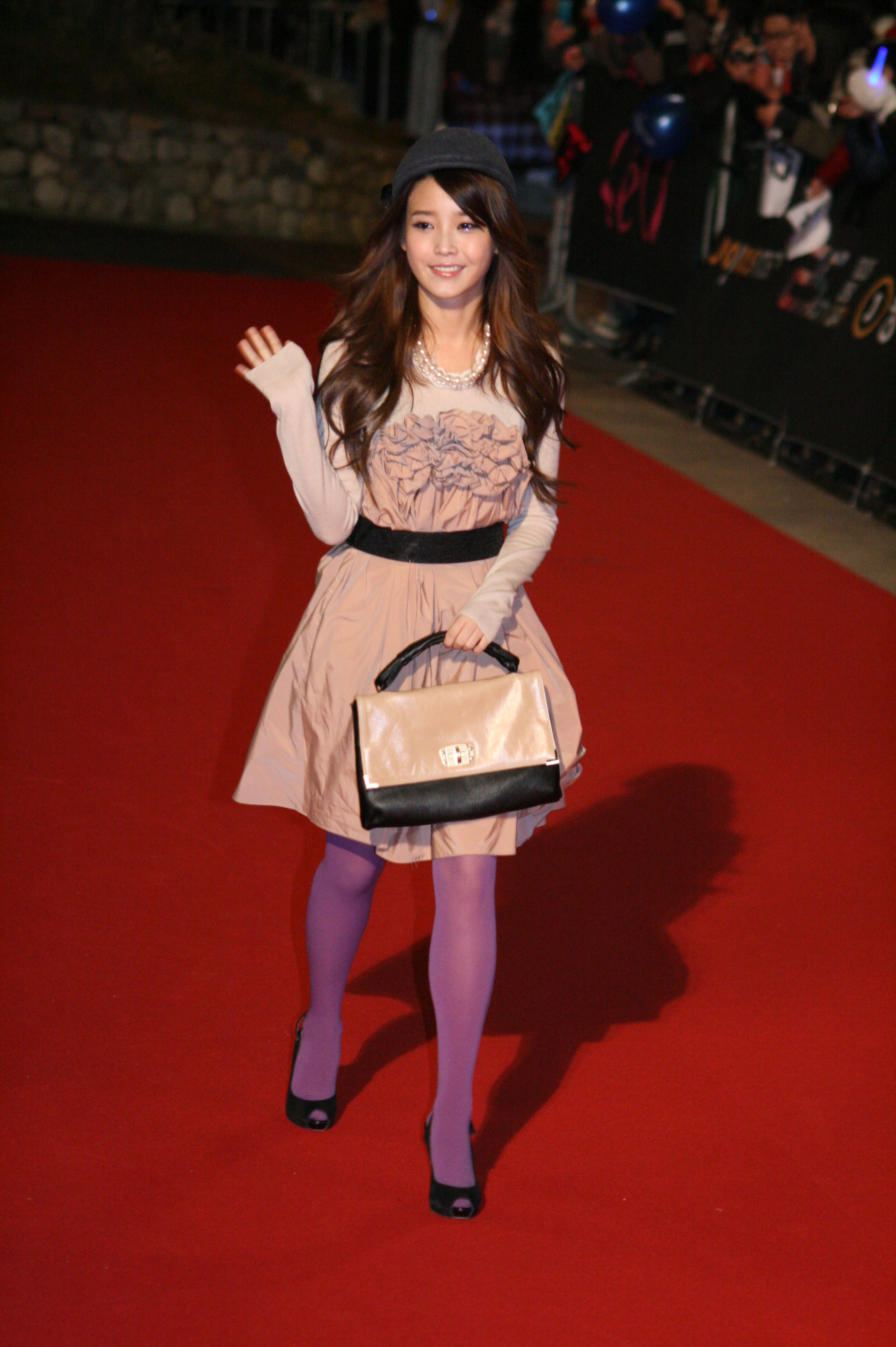
IU

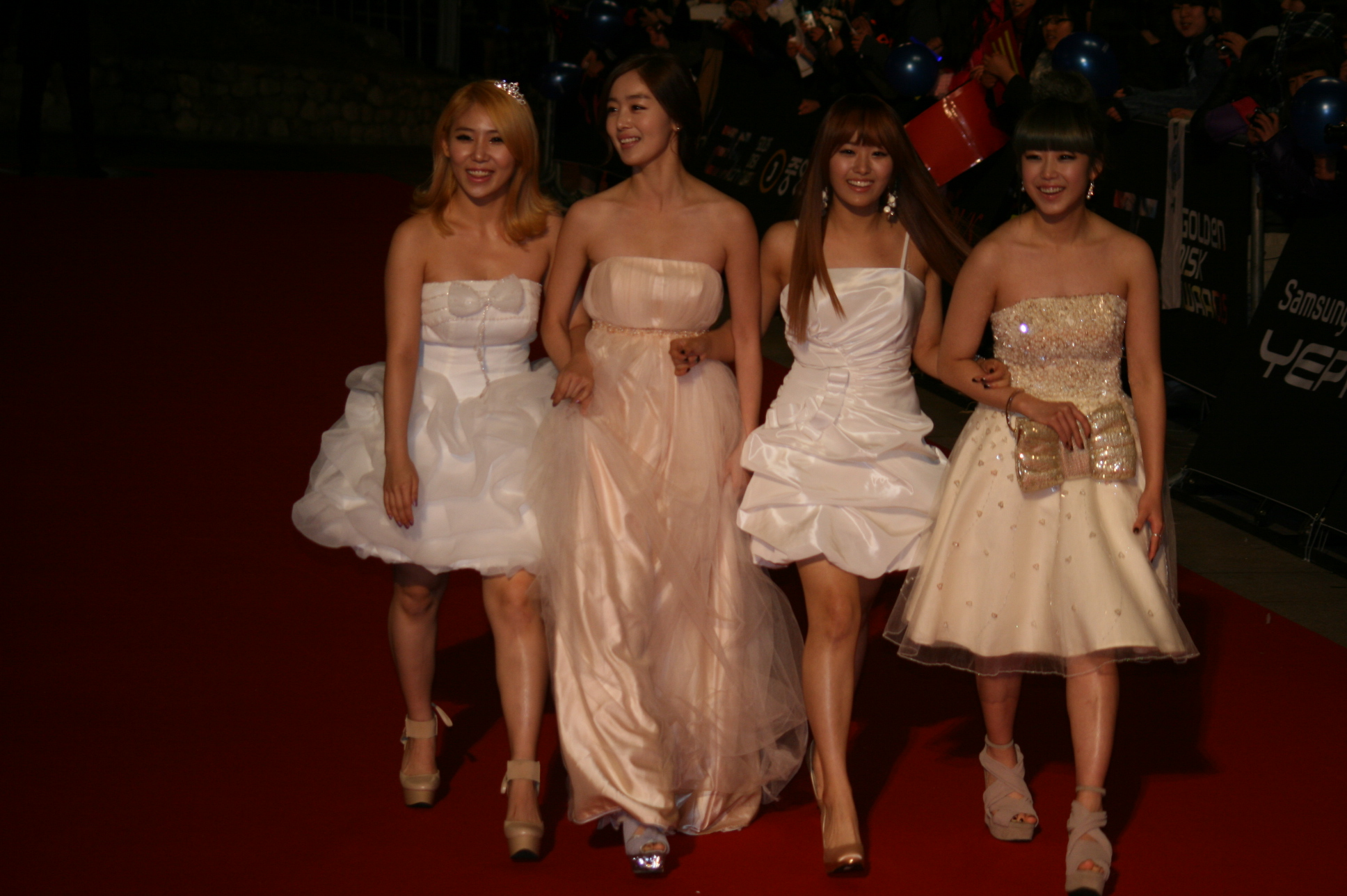
Secret

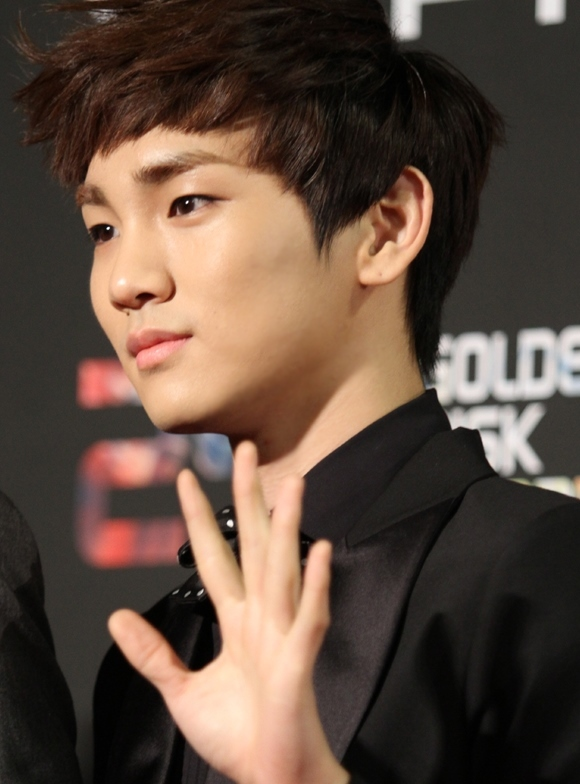
Shinee's Key

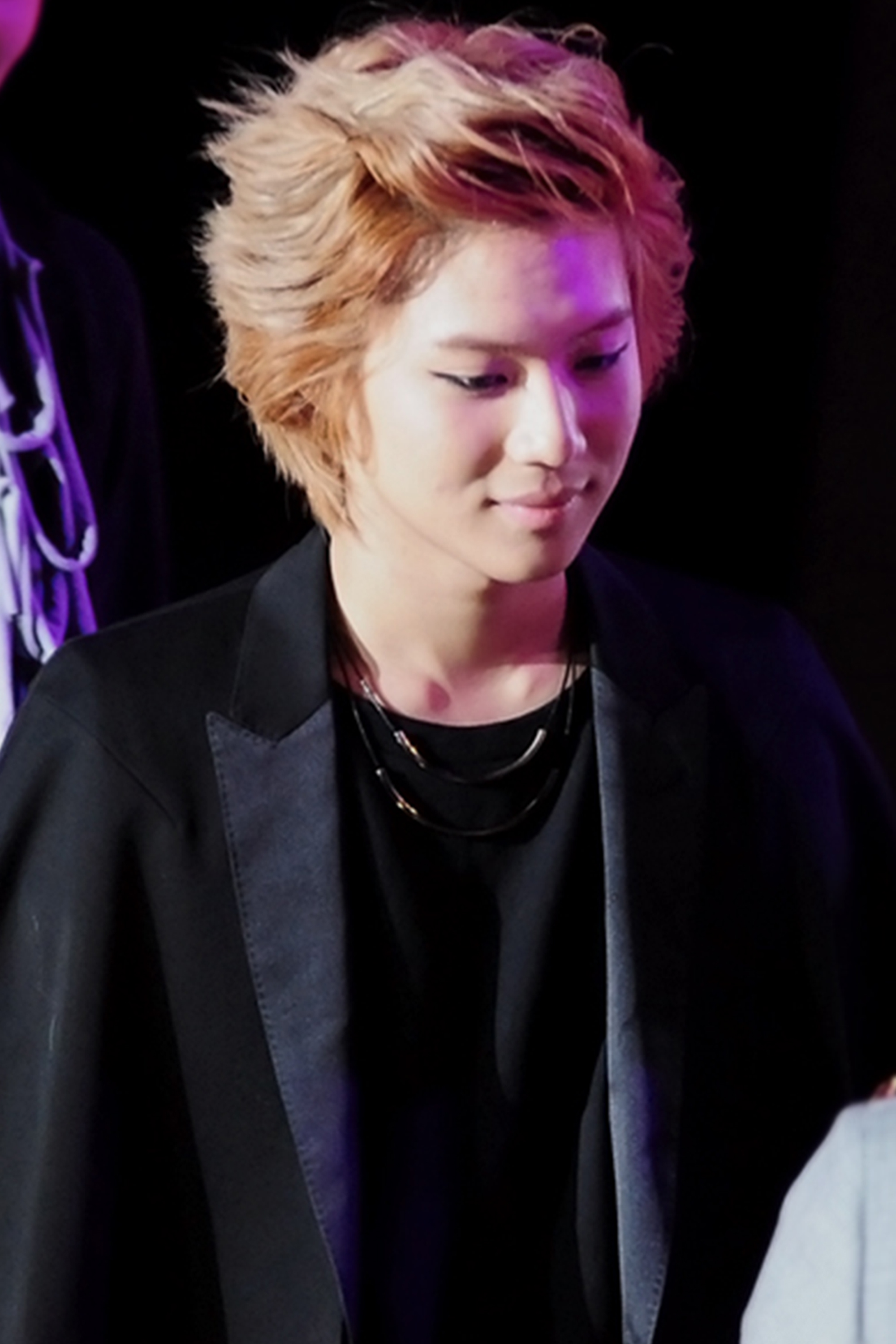
Shinee's Taemin

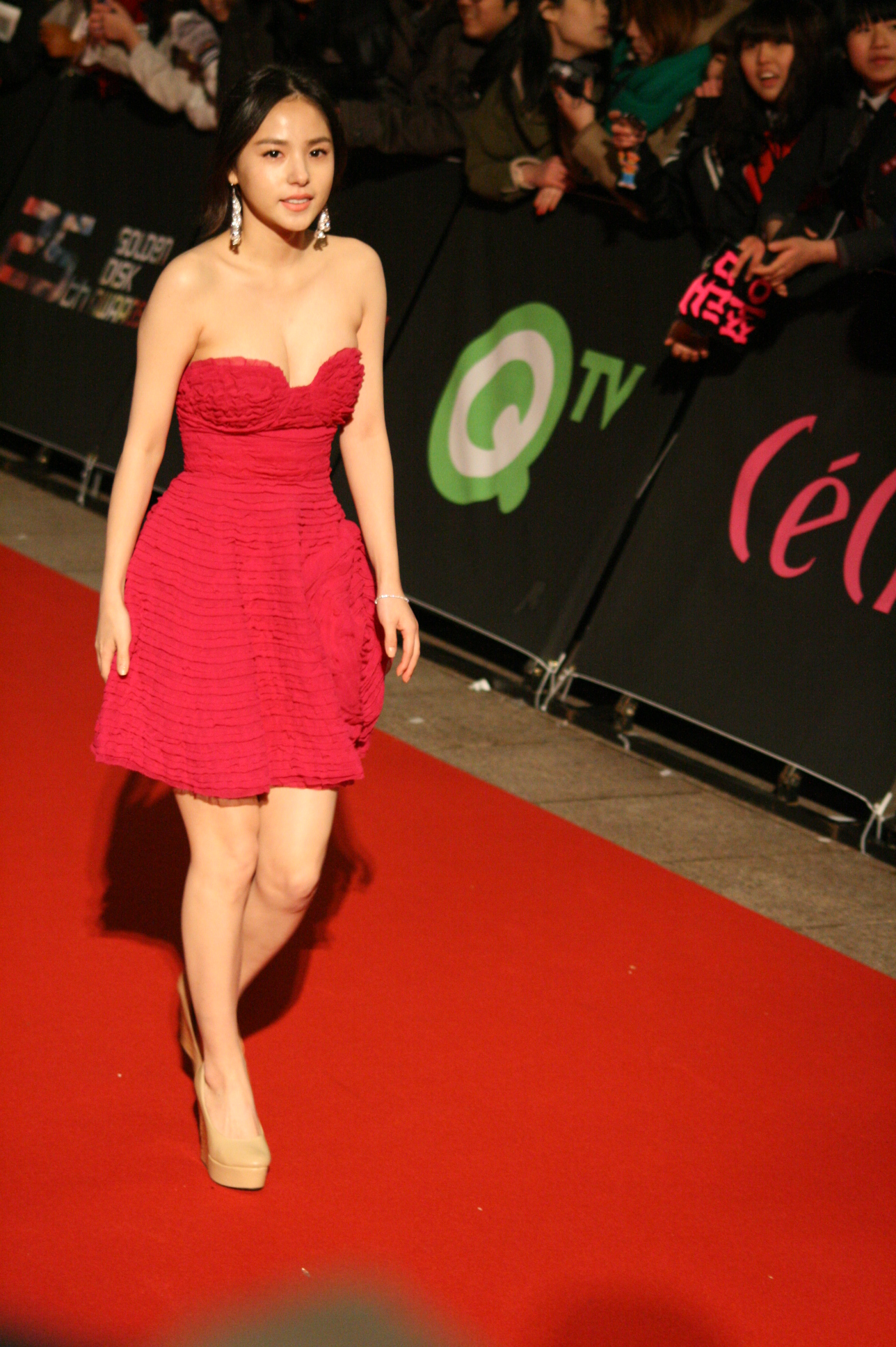
Min Hyo-rin

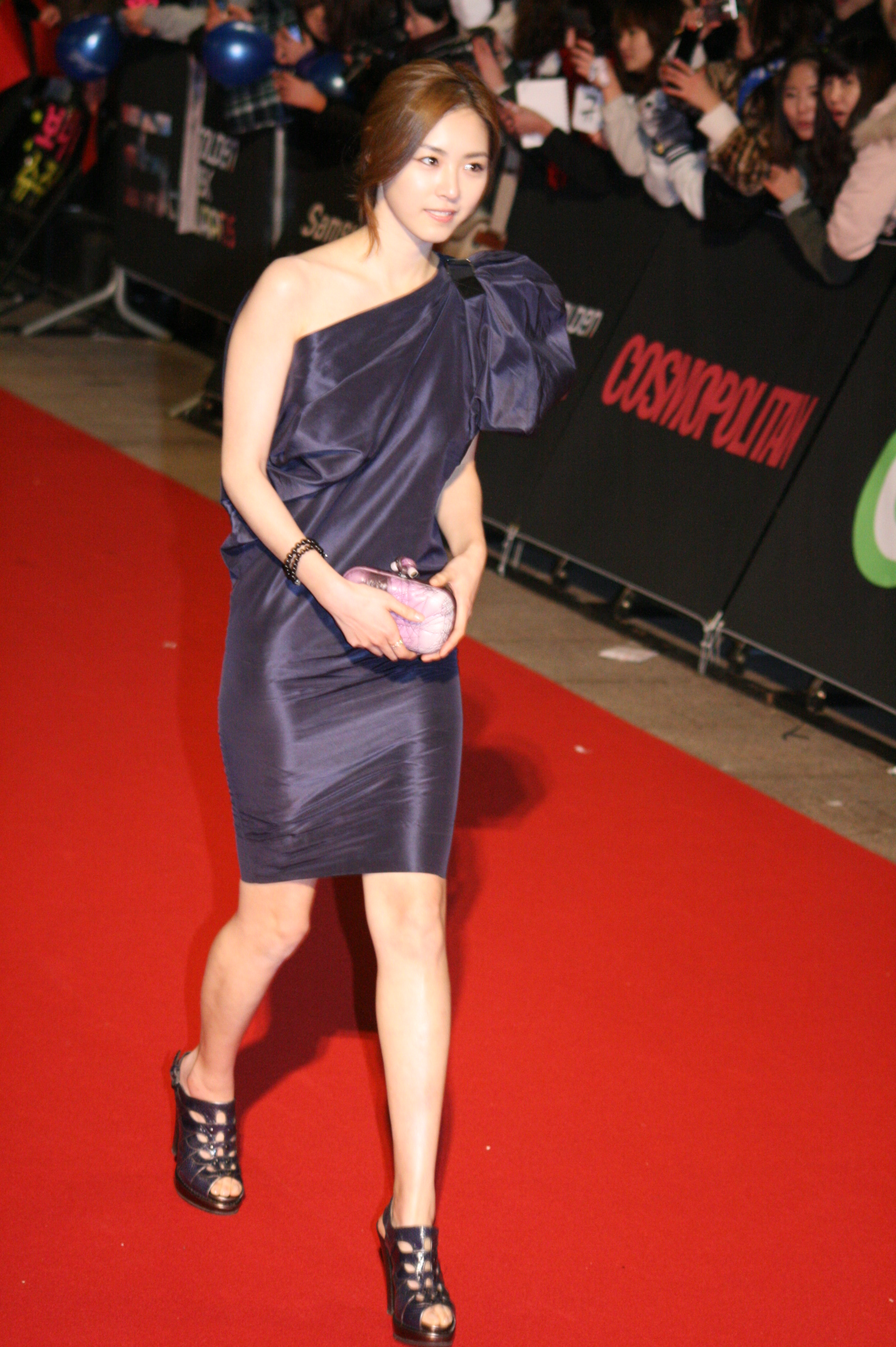
Lee Yeon-hee

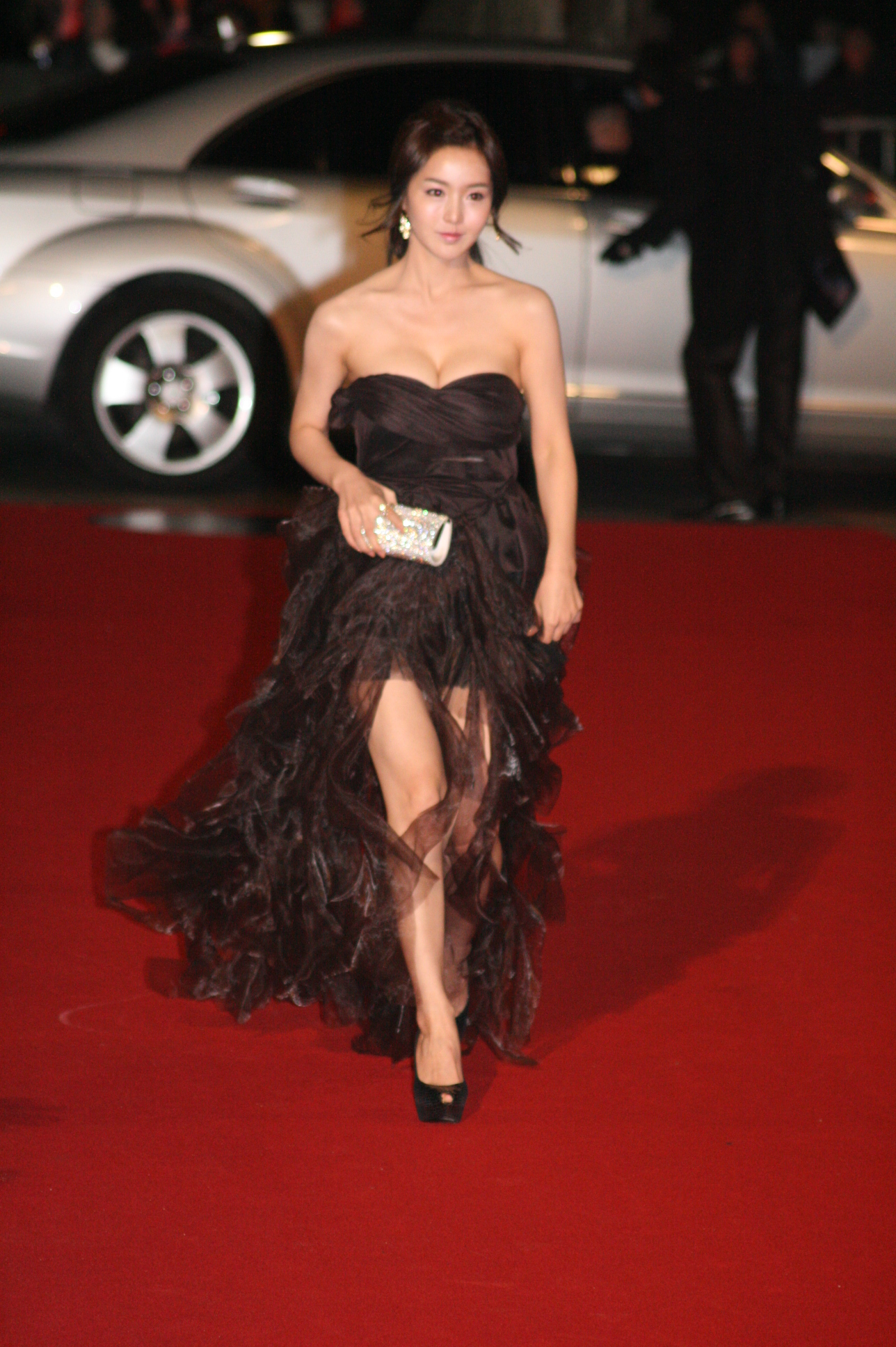
Nam Gyu-ri

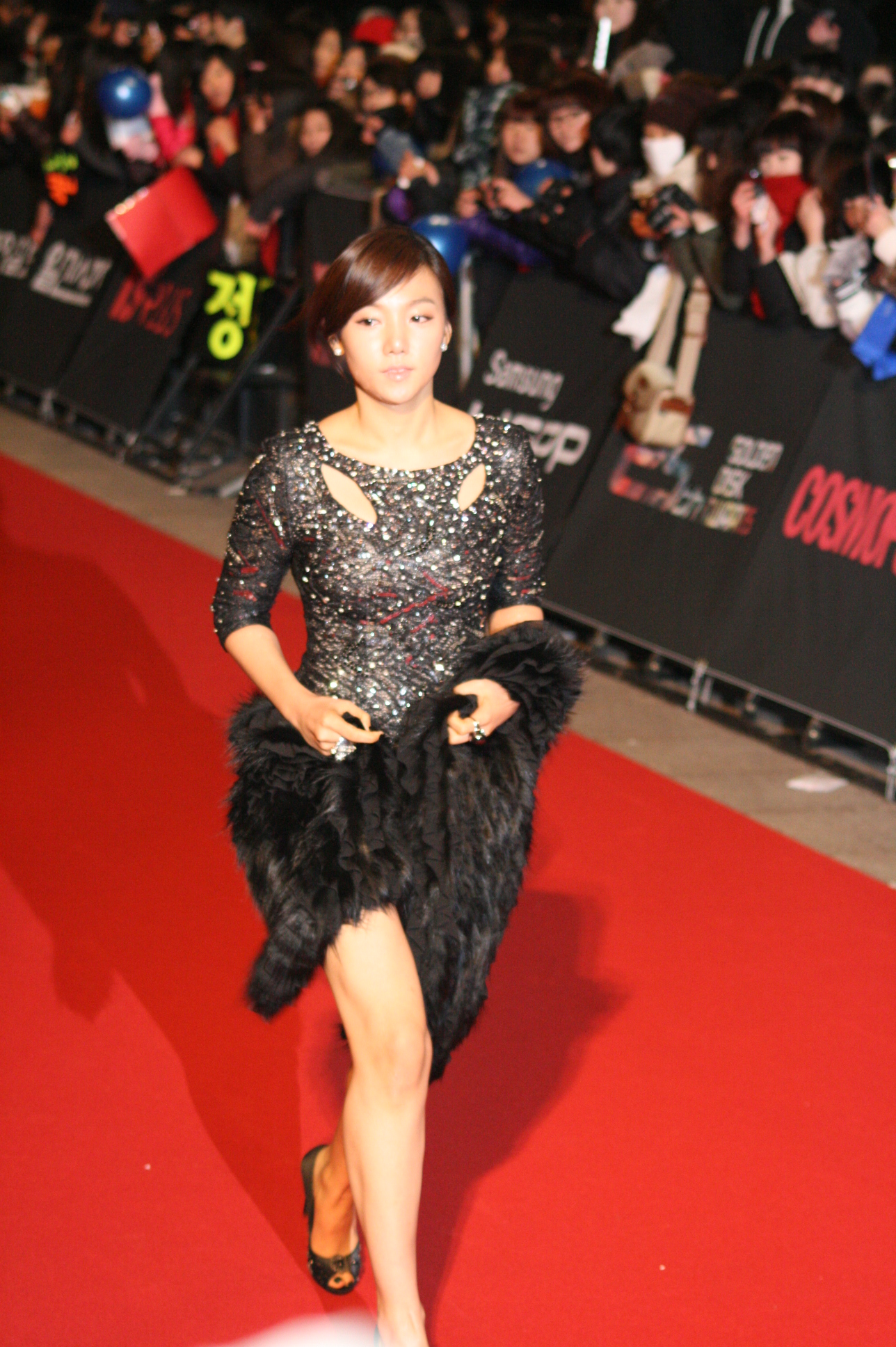
Lee Chae-young
