= Replay (EP) =

EP by Shinee
- Released: May 22, 2008 (South Korea)
- Recorded: April – May 2008
- Genres: Pop; R&B; dance
- Length: 18:50
- Languages: Korean; English
- Label: SM Entertainment

Shinee chronology
Replay (2008)	The Shinee World (2008)

Singles from Replay
- 1. "Replay" Released: May 22, 2008

Replay (Korean: 누난 너무 예뻐; lit: Noona (Older Girl) Is So Pretty) is the debut EP of South Korean boy group Shinee, released on May 22, 2008 through their label SM Entertainment. The lead single, "Replay", was created by producer Yoo Young-jin with a contemporary, sophisticated R&B feel and rhythm. The EP consists of five tracks and debuted at number 10 on the MIAK charts (Music Industry Association of Korea), peaking at number eight. The lead single became a hit, especially with the adult female demographic, because of its line, "Noona (older sister), you’re so pretty". Rino Nakasone worked on the choreography for the title song. The Korean music video included f(x)'s Victoria as the female lead, while the song's Japanese music video featured Yoona of Girls' Generation.

== Background and release ==
On May 22, 2008, Shinee released their first EP under SM Entertainment which contains five tracks, including a remix version of their title song. The eponymous title track was choreographed by Rino Nakasone, a Japanese dancer and choreographer. The Korean music video includes f(x)'s Victoria as the female lead. The Japanese music video, which was released in 2011, features Yoona of Girls' Generation.

After the release the title song gained huge success, especially with the older female demographic. The EP debuted at number 10 on the Korean music chart MIAK, which compiled sales figures for music releases until 2008, and peaked at number eight, selling 17,957 copies in the first half of 2008. Also, Shinee's fashion style, which was created by designer Ha Sang-beg and features high-top sneakers, skinny jeans, and colorful sweaters, gained a lot of attention. Their style created a fashion trend amongst students which the media dubbed the "Shinee Trend". Following the success of their debut, Shinee were chosen as endorsers for several brands, such as the cosmetic brand Nana's B and the sports brand Reebok.

On June 22, 2011, Shinee debuted in Japan and released the Japanese version of "Replay", selling more than 91,000 copies in the first week. It was subsequently certified Gold by RIAJ for selling over 100,000 copies. As of 2011, it was also the highest sales a Korean idol group had achieved for their debut in their first week of sales.

== Composition ==
Shinee were introduced as a contemporary R&B boy group and debuted with a mini-album which includes a variety of genres mixed to create a total of five diverse R&B songs. Songwriters Yoo Young-jin and Kenzie participated in the composition of the album to create a "sophisticated sound with a wide range of vocals".

== Track listing ==
Replay track listing
No.	Title	Lyrics	Music	Arrangement	Length
1.	"Replay" (Korean: 누난 너무 예뻐; RR: nunan neomu yeppeo; lit. 'Noona, You're So Pretty')	Young-hu Kim	Jack Kugell (The Heavyweights); Jason Pennock (The Heavyweights); Tchaka Diallo (The Heavyweights)	The Heavyweights; Yoo Young-jin	3:35
2.	"In My Room"	Young-hu Kim	David Kater; Tesung Kim (Iconic Sounds)	Tesung Kim	4:47
3.	"Real"	Kim Jeong-bae	Kenzie	Kenzie	3:33
4.	"Love Should Go On" (Korean: 사.계.한; RR: sa.gye.han)	Lee Yoon-jae	Lee	Lee	3:08
5.	"Replay" (Boom track)	Young-hu Kim	Kugell; Pennock; Diallo; RaVaughn; James Burney II	The Heavyweights; Yoo	4:28
Total length:					18:50

== Release history ==
Release dates and formats for Replay
Region	Date	Format	Label	Ref.
South Korea	May 22, 2008	CD; digital download	SM	
Taiwan	June 27, 2008	CD	Avex	
