= The Shinee World =

- Digital and A version cover

Studio album by Shinee
- Released: August 28, 2008
- Recorded: April – August 2008
- Genres: K-pop; pop; R&B
- Length: 47:32
- Languages: Korean; English
- Labels: SM; Avex Asia

Shinee chronology
Replay (2008)	The Shinee World (2008)	Romeo (2009)

Singles from The Shinee World
- 1. "Love Like Oxygen" Released: August 22, 2008

Repackage cover
- Digital and regular cover

Singles from Amigo
- 1. "Amigo" Released: October 24, 2008

The Shinee World (stylized as The SHINee WORLD) is the first studio album recorded by South Korean boy band Shinee. It was released on August 28, 2008, under SM Entertainment. The album contains twelve songs, including the lead single, "Love Like Oxygen". On October 29, 2008, the album was re-released under the title Amigo with three additional tracks.

== Concept and composition ==
For their first studio album, Shinee showed a more mature and masculine image compared to their debut concept. Many top producers and songwriters such as Yoo Young-jin, Kenzie and Wheesung participated in the production of the album. It includes twelve songs with different genres such as R&B, urban and pop.

The lead single, "Love Like Oxygen", is a remake of a song by Danish singer Martin Hoberg Hedegaard, originally titled "Show the World". It features a disco-based funky rhythm that is reminiscent of Michael Jackson and a drum pattern that commonly appears in American R&B music. The lyrics compare changes in love to ice, water, and oxygen in order to express the pain of letting go of someone. Yoo Young-jin's song "The Shinee World (Doo-Bop)" is characterized by a powerful beat and melody. Jonghyun's first solo "Hyeya (Y Si Fuera Ella)" is a cover of "Y, ¿Si Fuera Ella?", originally sung by the Spanish singer-songwriter Alejandro Sanz in 1997. "One for Me" is an urban R&B style song written by Wheesung.

== Release and reception ==
The Shinee World was released on August 28, 2008, preceded by lead single "Love Like Oxygen" on August 22. With "Love Like Oxygen", the group took first place on M Countdown on September 18, 2008, which brought them their first win on a South Korean music show since debut.

On October 29, 2008, the album was reissued under the title Amigo with three additional tracks: the title track, "Forever or Never" and a plugged version of "Love Should Go On". The title track was released digitally on October 24. In addition to meaning "friend" in Spanish, "Amigo" (아.미.고; a.mi.go) is a shortened version of the Korean phrase "You will suffer if you fall in love with a beautiful woman" (아름다운 미녀를 좋아하면 고생한다; areumdaun minyeoreul joahamyeon gosaenghanda). "Amigo" was choreographed by Misha Gabriel, an American dancer, choreographer, and actor.

The album was commercially successful in South Korea; it debuted at number three on the MIAK monthly music chart, selling 30,000 copies. Since its release, The Shinee World has sold over 80,000 copies. The album was awarded Newcomer Album of the Year at the 23rd Golden Disc Awards in 2008.

== Track listing ==
The Shinee World track listing – Standard edition
No.	Title	Lyrics	Music	Arrangement	Length
1.	"The Shinee World (Doo-Bop)"	Yoo Young-jin	Yoo	Yoo	3:55
2.	"Love's Way" (사랑의 길; sarangui gil)	Wheesung; Minho^{[a]}; JQ (Makeumine Works)^{[a]}	Alex Cantrall	Cantrall	3:29
3.	"Love Like Oxygen" (산소 같은 너; sanso gateun neo)	Young-hu Kim; Kwon Yoon-jung; Minho^{[a]}; JQ^{[a]}	Lucas Secon; Thomas Troelsen; Mikkel Sigvardt	Cho Yong-hoon	3:02
4.	"Romantic" (너 아니면 안되는 걸; neo animyeon andoeneun geol; lit. 'I Can't Be Without You')	Yoo	Yoo	Yoo	4:55
5.	"One for Me" (그녀가 헤어졌다; geunyeoga heeojyeotda)	Wheesung; Minho^{[a]}; JQ^{[a]}	Cantrall	Cantrall	3:25
6.	"Graze" (화장을 하고; hwajangeul hago)	Kim Jeong-bae; Minho^{[a]}; JQ^{[a]}; John Hyunkyu Lee^{[a]}	Kenzie	Kenzie	3:37
7.	"Last Gift (In My Room – Prelude)" (마지막 선물)	Ivy	David Kater; Tesung Kim (Iconic Sounds)	Tesung Kim	3:53
8.	"Best Place" (내 곁에만 있어; nae gyeoteman isseo)	Hong-seok; Park Hae-hyung; Minho^{[a]}; JQ^{[a]}	Hong-seok	Hong-seok	3:44
9.	"Y Si Fuera Ella" (혜야; hyeya) (Jonghyun solo)	Kenzie	Alejandro Sanz	Kenzie	5:15
10.	"Four Seasons" (눈을 감아보면; nuneul gamabomeyeon)	Jang Yeon-jeong; Tesung Kim	Martin Kember	Kember	4:06
11.	"In My Room" (Unplugged remix)	Young-hu Kim	Kater; Tesung Kim	Tesung Kim	4:25
12.	"Replay" (누난 너무 예뻐; nunan neomu yeppeo; lit. 'Noona, You're So Pretty')	Young-hu Kim	Jack Kugell (The Heavyweights); Jason Pennock (The Heavyweights); Tchaka Diallo (The Heavyweights); RaVaughn; James Burney II	The Heavyweights; Yoo^{[b]}	3:34
Total length:					47:49

Amigo track listing – Repackage edition
No.	Title	Lyrics	Music	Arrangement	Length
1.	"Amigo" (아.미.고 (아름다운 미녀를 좋아하면 고생한다); a.mi.go (areumdaun minyeoreul johahamyeon gosaenghanda); lit. 'If you like beauty, you suffer')	Yoo	Jimmy Andrew Richard; Sean Alexander (Avenue 52); Gabe Lopez; Michael Snyder	Yoo	2:58
2.	"Forever or Never"	Im Seo-hyun	Troelsen; Sigvardt	Ahn Ik-soo	3:06
3.	"Love Like Oxygen" (산소 같은 너; sanso gateun neo)	Young-hu Kim; Kwon; Minho^{[a]}; JQ^{[a]}	Secon; Troelsen; Sigvardt	Cho	3:02
4.	"Love Should Go On (plugged by DJ OneShot)" (사.계.한; sa.gye.han)	Lee Yoon-jae	Lee Yoon-jae	DJ OneShot	3:20
5.	"Replay" (누난 너무 예뻐; nunan neomu yeppeo; lit. 'Noona, You're So Pretty')	Young-hu Kim	Kugell; Pennock; Diallo; RaVaughn; Burney	The Heavyweights; Yoo^{[b]}	3:34
6.	"Romantic" (너 아니면 안되는 걸; neo animyeon andoeneun geol; lit. 'I Can't Be Without You')	Yoo	Yoo	Yoo	4:55
7.	"Love's Way" (사랑의 길; sarangui gil)	Wheesung; Minho^{[a]}; JQ^{[a]}	Cantrall	Cantrall	3:29
8.	"One for Me" (그녀가 헤어졌다; geunyeoga heeojyeotda)	Wheesung; Minho^{[a]}; JQ^{[a]}	Cantrall	Cantrall	3:25
9.	"Graze" (화장을 하고; hwajangeul hago)	Kim Jeong-bae; Minho^{[a]}; JQ^{[a]}; John Hyunkyu Lee^{[a]}	Kenzie	Kenzie	3:37
10.	"Last Gift (In My Room – Prelude)" (마지막 선물)	Ivy	Kater; Tesung Kim	Tesung Kim	3:53
11.	"Best Place" (내 곁에만 있어; nae gyeoteman isseo)	Hong-seok; Park; Minho^{[a]}; JQ^{[a]}	Hong-seok	Hong-seok	3:44
12.	"Y Si Fuera Ella" (혜야; hyeya) (Jonghyun solo)	Kenzie	Sanz	Kenzie	5:15
13.	"Four Seasons" (눈을 감아보면; nuneul gamabomeyeon)	Jang; Tesung Kim	Kember	Kember	4:06
14.	"In My Room" (Unplugged remix)	Young-hu Kim	Kater; Tesung Kim	Tesung Kim	4:25
15.	"The Shinee World (Doo-Bop)"	Yoo	Yoo	Yoo	3:55
Total length:					57:03

Notes

- ^{^[a]} – rap making
- ^{^[b]} – additional arrangement
- "Best Place" contains a sample from "Hope", a track from Construction Urban Flava compilation series, which itself samples "One for U", as written and performed by DJ Okawari.

== Release history ==
=== The Shinee World ===
Release dates and formats for The Shinee World
Region	Date	Format	Label	Ref.
South Korea	August 28, 2008	CD; digital download	SM	
Taiwan	September 26, 2008	CD	Avex	

=== Amigo ===
Release dates and formats for Amigo
Region	Date	Format	Edition	Label	Ref.
South Korea	October 29, 2008	CD; digital download	Standard	SM	
Taiwan	November 28, 2008	CD+DVD	Asia Special Edition	Avex	
Taiwan	February 20, 2009	CD+DVD	Taiwan Special Edition	Avex	
Japan	December 9, 2009	CD; CD+DVD	Japan	Rhythm Zone	
