= Young-hu Kim =

- Born: 7 November 1981 (age 44); Seoul, South Korea
- Genres: Pop; K-Pop; Dance-pop; R&B
- Occupations: Songwriter; Record producer; Entrepreneur
- Instruments: Piano
- Label: SM Entertainment

Korean name
- Hangul: 김영후
- RR: Gim Yeonghu
- MR: Kim Yŏnghu

Young-hu Kim (Korean: 김영후; born 7 November 1981) is a South Korean music producer, songwriter and software engineer. He works mainly with SM Entertainment artists, and has written songs for Girls' Generation, Exo, TVXQ, BoA, Shinee, f(x), Super Junior, Shinhwa, and Fly to the Sky.

== Career ==
Born on November 7, 1981, in Seoul, South Korea, Young-hu Kim started his career when he was signed to SM Entertainment as the youngest producer at the age of 15. His first number 1 single was Shinhwa's "I Pray For You", with work on subsequent hits including TVXQ's "Whatever They Say," Shinee's "Replay," and Girls' Generation's "Oh." He co-founded XP Music Publishing based in Los Angeles, with offices in Seoul and Tokyo, taking on projects in tech and building the first online music publishing catalog system in South Korea.

== Discography ==
=== South Korea ===
- BoA: My Prayer - 250,000 copies sold (platinum)
- BoA: If You Were Here - 120,000 copies sold
- BoA: Girls on Top(English Version)
- Exo: My Turn to Cry - 500,000 copies sold (2 platinum)
- Exo: Can't Bring Me Down - 1 Million copies sold
- Fly to the Sky: How Many Nights, How Many Days - 200,000 copies sold (platinum)
- Fly to the Sky: Magic Song - 170,000 copies sold - Number 3 on biggest online chart
- Fly to the Sky: My Never ending Story - 100,000 copies sold
- F(x): Me + U - 100,000 copies sold
- F(x): Goodbye Summer - 100,000 copies sold
- F(x): Summer Lover
- F(x): Diamond
- Girls' Generation: Let's Talk About Love - 100,000 copies sold
- Girls' Generation: Oh! - 300,000 copies sold (platinum) - number 1 on several countries. Number 1 on numerous music channels. Winner of Golden Disc Award
- Girls' Generation: Say Yes - 400,000 copies sold (2 platinum) - won Golden Disk Awards and Seoul Music Awards
- Isak N Jiyeon: I Dream Of You
- Parc Jae-jung: As much as I loved you
- S.E.S.: You Told Me
- Shinee: Replay
- Shinee: Love Like Oxygen
- Shinee: In my room - 150,000 copies sold
- Shinee: 차라리 때려 - 150,000 copies sold
- Shinee: Y.O.U. (Year Of Us)
- Shinee: Runaway - 250,000 copies sold (platinum)
- Shinhwa: Just 2 be with U - 400,000 copies sold (2 platinum)
- Shinhwa: I pray 4 U - 400,000 copies sold (2 platinum) - Number 1 song on MBC Music Show, SBS Music Show and several online charts. Japanese Anime "Inuyasha" Korea Territory title song
- Shinhwa: Soulmate - 300,000 copies sold (platinum)
- Shinhwa: Hurricane - 100,000 copies sold
- Super Junior: Over - 100,000 copies sold
- Super Junior: You're my endless love - 200,000 copies sold (platinum)
- Super Junior: She wants it - 300,000 copies sold (platinum)
- Super Junior: Shake It Up! - 300,000 copies sold (platinum)
- Super Junior: Over - 100,000 copies sold
- The Grace: Dancer In The Rain
- The Grace: Catch The Shooting Star
- Tim: Sarang Han Mankeum
- Tim: My Destiny
- Tim: Nae Ahn Eh Jun Jeng
- Tim: Manual For My Heart
- TVXQ: Whatever They Say - 300,000 copies sold (platinum) - Number 4 on SBS music show.
- TVXQ: Free your mind
- TVXQ: Beautiful Life - 300,000 copies sold (platinum)
- TVXQ: 세상의단하나뿐인마음
- TVXQ: On & On - 535,000 copies sold (2 platinum) - Number 1 album of 2006 + Winner of Golden Disc Award.
- TVXQ: Crazy Love
- TVXQ: 넌 나의 노래 - 600,000 copies sold (2 platinum) - Number 1 album of 2008, Winner of Golden Disc Award.
- TVXQ: Here I stand - 300,000 copies sold (platinum)
- Whee Sung: Angel - 400,000 copies sold (2 platinum)
- Xdinary Heroes: Beautiful Life - 100,000 copies sold

=== Japan ===
- Girls' Generation Oh! single: Oh! - 100,000 copies sold (gold) - Number One on Oricon Chart
- Girls' Generation 2nd album: Oh! - 200,000 copies sold (gold)
- Shinee 1st single album: Replay - 110,000 copies sold (gold)
- Shinee 1st album: Replay - 120,000 copies sold (gold)
- Tenjochiki Piranha album: Just for one day - 100,000 copies sold (gold)
- TVXQ 3rd album: Beautiful Life -150,000 copies sold (gold)
- TVXQ 3rd Album: You're my miracle - 150,000 copies sold (gold)
- TVXQ Bolero album: Wasurenaide - 150,000 copies sold (gold)
- TVXQ 4th album: Wasurenaide - 300,000 copies sold (platinum)
- YUTA 1st album: If We Lose It All Tonight
