= Replay (Shinee song) =

- Japanese Digital/Regular cover

Single by Shinee

from the EP Replay and the album The First
- Language: Korean; Japanese
- B-side: "Hello" (Japanese Version)
- Released: May 22, 2008
- Studio: SM Blue Ocean (Seoul); SM Booming System (Seoul)
- Genre: R&B
- Length: 3:33
- Label: SM
- Composer: The Heavyweights
- Lyricist: Young-hu Kim

Shinee singles chronology
| "Replay" (2008) | "Love Like Oxygen" (2008) |

Music video
- "Replay" on YouTube

"Replay" (Korean: 누난 너무 예뻐; RR: Nunan neomu yeppeo; lit. 'Noona, You're So Pretty') is the debut single by South Korean boy band Shinee, recorded for the extended play of the same name. It was released on May 22, 2008, through SM Entertainment. A Japanese version of the song was later released on June 22, 2011, through EMI Music Japan.

== Background and release ==
On May 19, 2008, SM Entertainment announced the formation of their new boy band, Shinee. Described as a "contemporary band", the group was composed of five teenagers and was intended to set trends in music, fashion and dance. A teaser for the music video of their debut single, "Replay", was released the same day. The song and its accompanying music video were released on May 22, alongside the EP of the same name. The music video features Victoria of f(x) as the female lead. The choreography was created by Rino Nakasone. The music video was remastered in 4K and was re-released on April 20, 2022.

"Replay" is a contemporary R&B song composed by The Heavyweights, who co-arranged with Yoo Young-jin, while the lyrics was written by Young-hu Kim. The lyrics are from the perspective of a young man in love with an older woman. The line, "Noona (older sister), you're so pretty", directly targets the adult female demographic. The group took an entire day to record the song, finding it unexpectedly challenging and vocal-driven. Prior to their debut, three of the group's five members were training to be rappers; only Jonghyun and Onew were vocalists. The youngest member, Taemin, did not feature on the song at all.

== Promotion ==
Shinee performed "Replay" for the first time on the music program Inkigayo on May 25, 2008. The performance attracted over 800 fans, and the group held an event afterwards at a nearby park where they handed out lollipops. They also performed at the 2008 Dream Concert on June 7.

== Critical reception ==
Writing in 2008, Jo I-seul of IZM described "Replay" as a "trendy" and "high-quality" song, but did not find it lived up to the originality implied by Shinee's "contemporary band" label. Retrospectively, "Replay" has met with more positive reviews. It was named one of the top 100 K-pop songs of all time by a panel of 35 music critics and industry experts in association with Melon and the Seoul Shinmun. According to music critic Kim Yun-ha, "Replay" laid the foundation for Shinee's "unique identity", and carries the "mint-coloured freshness" that the public associates with the group. Park Chang-young of Maeil Business Newspaper stated that "Replay" "opened a new chapter in idol music". Writing for Marie Claire, Quinci LeGardye called the song "one of the best idol debuts ever". Insider named it one of the best debut songs of all time in K-pop.

=== Accolades ===
Awards and nominations for "Replay"
| Ceremony | Year | Category | Result | Ref. |
|---|---|---|---|---|
| Cyworld Digital Music Awards | 2008 | Rookie of the Month – May | Won | |
| Golden Disc Awards | 2008 | Rookie of the Year – Digital Music | Nominated | |

== Japanese version ==
A Japanese version of "Replay", titled "Replay (Kimi wa Boku no Everything)", was released on June 22, 2011, featuring the Japanese version of "Hello" as a B-side. Yoona of Girls' Generation appeared in the music video. Shinee celebrated its release with a live showcase at Abbey Road Studios in London, becoming the first Asian artists to perform there. The single sold over 91,000 copies in the first week, setting a new sales record for the Japanese debut single of a Korean group. It was certified Gold by RIAJ for selling over 100,000 copies, the first debut single by a Korean male group to do so. The song was later included on Shinee's first Japanese album, The First.

== Credits and personnel ==
Credits adapted from the liner notes of Replay.

Recording

- Recorded and mixed at SM Booming System
- Recorded at SM Blue Ocean Studio
- Mastered at Sonic Korea

Personnel

- Shinee – vocals, background vocals
- Young-hu Kim – lyrics, directing, vocal directing, recording
- The Heavyweights – composition, arrangement
- RaVaughn – composition
- James Burney II – composition
- Yoo Young-jin – arrangement, directing, vocal directing, background vocals, recording, mixing
- KAT – recording
- Jeon Hoon – mastering

== Charts ==
=== Korean version ===
Chart performance for "Replay"
| Chart (2018) | Peak position |
|---|---|
| US World Digital Song Sales (Billboard) | 12 |

=== Japanese version ===
Chart performance for "Replay (Kimi wa Boku no Everything)"
| Chart (2011) | Peak position |
|---|---|
| Japan (Japan Hot 100) | 2 |
| Japan (Oricon) | 2 |

== Sales and certifications ==
Sales and certifications for "Replay"
| Region | Certification | Certified units/sales |
|---|---|---|
| Japan (RIAJ) Japanese ver. | Gold | 100,000^{^} |
| United States (Billboard) | — | 22,000 |
^{^} Shipments figures based on certification alone.

== Release history ==
Release dates and formats for "Replay"
| Region | Date | Format | Version | Label | Ref. |
|---|---|---|---|---|---|
| South Korea | May 22, 2008 | Digital download; streaming | Korean | SM | |
| Various | May 26, 2011 | Digital download; streaming | Japanese | EMI | |
| Japan | June 22, 2011 | CD; DVD | Japanese | EMI | |
