= Show the World =

2008 single by Martin

Single by Martin

from the album Show the World
- Released: May 12, 2008
- Genre: Pop, Disco
- Length: 3:02
- Label: Sony BMG Music Entertainment Denmark
- Songwriters: Mikkel Remee Sigvardt, Lucas Secon, Thomas Troelsen

Martin singles chronology
""The #1"" (2008)	"Show the World" (2008)	""Report to the Dance Floor"" (2008)

Music video
- "Show the World" on YouTube

"Show the World" is a song by the first Danish X Factor winner, Martin. It is the second single off his debut album, Show the World (2008). It was written by the Danish songwriting and production team of Thomas Troelsen, Remee and Lucas Secon. Martin's singing has been compared to Michael Jackson and Justin Timberlake.

== Charts and certifications ==
Chart (2008)	Peak position
Denmark (Tracklisten)	1

Region	Certification	Certified units/sales
Denmark (IFPI Denmark)	Platinum	15,000

== Love Like Oxygen ==
"Love Like Oxygen"

Single by Shinee

from the album The Shinee World
- Released: August 25, 2008
- Genre: K-pop, Pop, Disco
- Length: 3:02
- Label: SM Entertainment
- Songwriters: Yunjeong Gwon, Young-hu Kim, Mikkel Remee Sigvardt, Lucas Secon, Thomas Troelsen
- Producer: Yonghun Jo

Shinee singles chronology
"Replay" (2008)	"Love Like Oxygen" (2008)	"Amigo" (2008)

Music video
- "Love Like Oxygen" on YouTube

In 2008, South Korean boy band Shinee recorded a remake version of the song in Korean as "Love Like Oxygen" (Korean:"산소 같은 너 (Love Like Oxygen). It was released as the first single from The Shinee World (2008).

=== Music video ===
The music video consist of the boys dancing in a white room, wearing colorful outfits at first and then black and white outfits near the end. It switches from scenes to the boys in a club having individual shots of their solo parts. The dance was choreographed by Japanese dancer Rino Nakasone-Razalan.

=== Release ===
SM Entertainment promoted "Love Like Oxygen" as the group's debut single outside of South Korea. The group travelled to Thailand in November 2008, where the single reached number one (as well as the album). The single continued to be released throughout Asia into early 2009. The single and album were also released in Taiwan.

=== Track listing ===
No.	Title	Length
1.	"Love Like Oxygen" (산소 같은 너; sanso gateun neo)	3:02
2.	"Love Like Oxygen" (Instrumental)	3:02

=== Accolades ===
Music program awards for "Love Like Oxygen"
Program	Date	Ref.
M Countdown	September 18, 2008	
Inkigayo	September 21, 2008	
