= Don't Call Me =

Don't Call Me may refer to:

- Don't Call Me (album), a 2021 album by Shinee
  - "Don't Call Me" (song)
- "Don't Call Me", song by The Swon Brothers
- "Don't Call Me", song by MAX from the single "Love Screw"
- "Don't Call Me", song by Johnny Warman
- "Don't Call Me", song by the Highwomen from their 2019 self-titled album
