= Don't Call Me (song) =

- iScreaM Vol. 7: Don't Call Me Remixes cover

Single by Shinee

from the album Don't Call Me
- Language: Korean
- Released: February 22, 2021
- Studio: SM Blue Cup Studio; SM Big Shot Studio
- Genre: Hip hop; dance
- Length: 3:40
- Label: SM; Dreamus
- Composers: Kenzie; Dem Jointz; Rodnae "Chikk" Bell
- Lyricist: Kenzie

Shinee singles chronology
"Countless" (2018)	"Don't Call Me" (2021)	"Atlantis" (2021)

Music video
- "Don't Call Me" on YouTube

"Don't Call Me" is a song by South Korean boy band Shinee. It was released on February 22, 2021, through SM Entertainment and served as the lead single for the album of the same name. "Don't Call Me" was composed by Kenzie, Dem Jointz and Rodnae "Chikk" Bell, and arranged by Dem Jointz, Yoo Young-jin, Kenzie, Ryan S. Jhun and Robbin, with the lyrics was written by Kenzie. It was the group's first single since members Onew, Key and Minho returned from the military.

== Background ==
Following the release of Shinee's sixth studio album, The Story of Light, in 2018, the group took a three-year hiatus as members Onew, Key and Minho enlisted in the military to complete their mandatory service. Upon their return, SM Entertainment announced that Shinee would release a new album, titled Don't Call Me, fronted by the single of the same name. The song was originally intended for their labelmate BoA and favoured by company founder Lee Soo-man, who provided the group with guidance throughout the production process. Shinee considered a number of songs as lead single, but selected "Don't Call Me" because they felt it was different from what they had done before and left a strong impact. They also wanted a more performance-driven song.

== Composition ==
"Don't Call Me" is a hip hop-inspired dance song which warns an ex-lover against calling following a betrayal. The lyrics, penned by Kenzie, express deep contempt towards their obsessive behaviour. The song incorporates 808 bass sounds, dark synths and heavy beats. In the latter part of the song, there is a piano section.

== Release and promotion ==
Teaser images and videos were released beginning February 9, 2021. The group also set up a hotline where fans could listen to messages recorded by the members and leave their own messages in turn; however, the server crashed due to the overwhelming number of calls. Shinee previewed the song on the variety show Knowing Bros ahead of its release. "Don't Call Me" was released on February 22, 2021, alongside its music video and album. Shinee performed the song for the first time on M Countdown on February 25. Two remixes of "Don't Call Me" by Fox Stevenson and ESAI were released on March 27 through ScreaM Records. A Japanese version of the song was later included on Shinee's first Japanese extended play, Superstar.

== Reception ==
"Don't Call Me" on critic lists
Publication	List	Rank	Ref.
Paper	The 40 Best K-Pop Songs of 2021	12	
PhilStar Life	21 K-pop title tracks that defined 2021	18	
Rolling Stone Korea	The 10 Best K-Pop Songs of 2021	9	
The National	The best K-pop songs of 2021	Placed	
Teen Vogue	The 54 Best K-Pop Songs of 2021	Placed	
Young Post	15 Best K-pop Songs of 2021	4	

== Accolades ==
Awards and nominations for "Don't Call Me"
Ceremony	Year	Category	Result	Ref.
Gaon Chart Music Awards	2022	Song of the Year – February	Won	
Golden Disc Awards	2022	Digital Bonsang	Nominated	
Mnet Asian Music Awards	2021	Song of the Year	Longlisted	
Mnet Asian Music Awards	2021	Best Dance Performance – Male Group	Nominated	

Music program awards for "Don't Call Me"
Program	Date	Ref.
Show Champion	March 3, 2021	
Show Champion	March 10, 2021	
M Countdown	March 4, 2021	
M Countdown	March 11, 2021	
Show! Music Core	March 6, 2021	
Inkigayo	March 7, 2021	

== Credits and personnel ==
Credits adapted from the liner notes of Don't Call Me.

Recording

- Recorded and mixed at SM Blue Cup Studio
- Recorded, digitally edited and engineered for mix at SM Big Shot Studio
- Mastered at 821 Sound Mastering

Personnel

- Shinee – vocals, background vocals
- Kenzie – lyrics, composition, arrangement, directing
- Dem Jointz – composition, arrangement
- Rodnae "Chikk" Bell – composition
- Yoo Young-jin – arrangement, background vocals
- Ryan S. Jhun – arrangement
- Robbin – arrangement
- Jeong Eui-seok – recording, mixing
- Lee Min-gyu – recording, digital editing, engineering for mix
- Kwon Nam-woo – mastering

== Charts ==
Chart performance for "Don't Call Me"
Chart (2021)	Peak position
Japan (Japan Hot 100)	98
South Korea (Gaon)	3
South Korea (K-pop Hot 100)	7
US World Digital Song Sales (Billboard)	8

== Release history ==
Release dates and formats for "Don't Call Me"
Region	Date	Format	Version	Label	Ref.
Various	February 22, 2021	Digital download; streaming	Korean	SM; Dreamus	
Various	March 27, 2021	Digital download; streaming	Remixes	SM; ScreaM	
Various	June 28, 2021	Digital download; streaming	Japanese	EMI	
