= SM Town Live 2022: SMCU Express =

2022 concert tour by SM Town

- Asia tour by SM Town
- Promotional poster of the tour in Suwon, South Korea
- Location: East Asia
- Start date: August 20, 2022
- End date: August 29, 2022
- No. of shows: 1 in South Korea; 3 in Japan; 4 in total

SM Town concert chronology
- SM Town Live 2022: SMCU Express at Kwangya (2022); SM Town Live 2022: SMCU Express (2022); SM Town Live 2023: SMCU Palace at Kwangya (2023)

SM Town Live 2022: SMCU Express is a concert tour by SM Town. The tour commenced with one show in Suwon, South Korea, and then continued with three shows in Tokyo, Japan. The concert is SM Town's first in-person concert in almost three years since SM Town Live 2019 in Tokyo (2019), and the first South Korea concert in five years since SM Town Live World Tour VI (2017–2018).

== Background ==
SM Town is the name for the artists under Korean record label SM Entertainment. Normally, each year the company organizes their artists to come together and perform a four to six hours long concert that tours around the Asian continent. However, due to the COVID-19 pandemic that started from the beginning of 2020, the usual in-person concert had to halt for a while, including the annual SM Town concert. Instead, during the New Year season of 2021 and 2022, SM Entertainment held two online free concerts, SM Town Live Culture Humanity (2021) and SM Town Live 2022: SMCU Express at Kwangya (2022).

On April 25, 2022, SM Entertainment announced that SM Town would hold a two-day concert at Tokyo Dome on August 27 and 28. It was the first SM Town concert held in Japan in three years. Alongside the announcement, an lineup consisting of Kangta, BoA, TVXQ, Super Junior, Taeyeon, Hyoyeon, Shinee, Suho, Chen, Kai, Red Velvet, NCT, Aespa, Raiden, and Kinjo was released. On June 23, an additional date was released since the previous two sold out. The concert was held for three days from the 27th to the 29th.

On June 30, 2022, SM Entertainment announced that SM Town would hold a concert at the Suwon World Cup Stadium in Suwon, South Korea, on August 20. It was their first in-person concert held in South Korea since 2017. The initial lineup included Kangta, BoA, TVXQ, Super Junior, Taeyeon, Hyoyeon, Red Velvet, Kai, Suho, Chen, Key, Minho, Onew, NCT, Aespa, Raiden and Kinjo. Girls' Generation, Xiumin, D.O., Got the Beat, Imlay and J.E.B. were also included in a final lineup released on July 12. Tickets were put on sale on Yes24 on July 26 for fan club members, while regular ticket reservations were set to start on July 28. The concert was streamed through KNTV and Beyond Live. Tickets were put on sale on the SM Town & Store website on August 2.

== Critical reception ==
Hong Dam-young of The Korea Herald wrote positively about the concert in Tokyo, saying it "successfully recaptured the spirit of [SM's] early heyday". Hong appreciated the combining of various genres throughout the performances and highlighted Super Junior among all the artists, praising their ability to "break down the language barrier". Hong concluded saying: "It was undeniable: SM is still a key player, and a home to some of the biggest and most cutting-edge musicians in the scene".

== Performers ==
Suwon, South Korea (August 20, 2022)

Performers

- Kangta
- BoA
- TVXQ
- Super Junior
- Girls' Generation
- Key (Shinee)
- Minho (Shinee)
- Xiumin (Exo)
- Suho (Exo)
- Chen (Exo)
- D.O. (Exo)
- Kai (Exo)
- Red Velvet
- NCT
- Aespa
- Got the Beat
- SM Rookies (Shohei, Eunseok, Seunghan)
- ScreaM Records (DJ Hyo, Raiden, Ginjo, Imlay, J.E.B)
Tokyo, Japan (August 27–29, 2022)

Performers

- Kangta
- BoA
- Max Changmin (TVXQ)
- Super Junior
- Taeyeon (Girls' Generation)
- Hyoyeon (Girls' Generation)
- Onew (Shinee)
- Key (Shinee)
- Minho (Shinee)
- Xiumin (Exo)
- Suho (Exo)
- Chen (Exo)
- Kai (Exo)
- Red Velvet
- NCT
- Aespa
- Got the Beat
- SM Rookies (Shohei, Eunseok, Seunghan)
- ScreaM Records (DJ Hyo, Raiden, Ginjo)

== Set lists ==
Suwon, South Korea (August 20, 2022)

DJ Opening Show

1. J.E.B (VEEF Entertainment)
2. Imlay (ScreaM Records) (feat. Yangyang)
3. Ginjo (ScreaM Records)
4. Raiden (ScreaM Records)
5. Hyoyeon (DJ Hyo) (ScreaM Records)

Concert

1. "Next Level" – Aespa
2. "Like Water" – Wendy
3. "Hello" – Joy
4. "Hurdle" – Suho
5. "Kick Back" (Korean ver.) – WayV
6. "Beatbox" – NCT Dream
7. "Queendom" – Red Velvet
8. "Beautiful Goodbye" – Chen
9. "That's Okay" – D.O.
10. "Miracle" – WayV
11. "Favorite (Vampire)" – NCT 127
12. "Peaches" - Kai
13. "Serenity" – Xiumin
14. "INVU" – Taeyeon
15. "Deep" – Hyoyeon
16. "Black Suit" – Super Junior
17. "Sorry, Sorry" – Super Junior
18. "Bonamana" – Super Junior
19. "Don't Wait" – Super Junior
20. "Dream Routine" – Shotaro, Sungchan (NCT), Shohei, Eunseok, Seunghan (SM Rookies)
21. "Zoo" – Taeyong, Hendery, Jeno, Yangyang (NCT), Giselle (Aespa)
22. "Step Back" – Got the Beat
23. "Golden" – Raiden feat. Xiaojun, Sungchan (NCT)
24. "Thank U" – U-Know
25. "Heartbreak" – Minho
26. "Bad Love" – Key
27. "Illusion" – Aespa
28. "Only One" – BoA
29. "Eyes on You" – Kangta
30. "Devil" – Max Changmin
31. "Universe (Let's Play Ball)" – NCT U
32. "Resonance" – NCT
33. "Mirotic" – TVXQ!
34. "Hi Ya Ya Summer Day" – TVXQ!
35. "Balloons" – TVXQ!
36. "Forever 1" – Girls' Generation
37. "Party" – Girls' Generation
38. "Glitch Mode" – NCT Dream
39. "Girls" – Aespa
40. "Feel My Rhythm" – Red Velvet
41. "Sticker" – NCT 127
42. "Gasoline" – Key
43. "Mango" – Super Junior
44. "Better" – BoA
45. "Rising Sun" – TVXQ!
46. "Hope from Kwangya" – SM Town
Tokyo, Japan (August 27–29, 2022)

DJ Opening Show

1. Ginjo (ScreaM Records)
2. Raiden (ScreaM Records)
3. Hyoyeon (DJ Hyo) (ScreaM Records)

Concert

1. "Next Level" (day 1) / "Black Mamba" & "Next Level" (day 2 & 3) – Aespa
2. "Kick Back" (Korean ver.) – WayV
3. "Beatbox" (day 1) / "Beatbox" & "Hot Sauce" (day 2 & 3) – NCT Dream
4. "Beautiful Goodbye" – Chen
5. "Way" - Onew feat. Ningning
6. "Hurdle" – Suho
7. "Wildside" – Red Velvet
8. "C.h.a.o.s.m.y.t.h" (cover) - Yesung
9. "Gimme Gimme" (day 1) / "Gimme Gimme" & "Sticker" (day 2 & 3) - NCT 127
10. "Dice" - Onew
11. "Ashura-chan" (cover) - Max Changmin, Kyuhyun & Minho
12. "Dream Routine" – Shotaro, Sungchan (NCT), Shohei, Eunseok, Seunghan (SM Rookies)
13. "Zoo" – Taeyong, Hendery, Jeno, Yangyang (NCT), Giselle (Aespa)
14. "Eyes on You" – Kangta
15. "Golden" – Raiden feat. Xiaojun, Sungchan (NCT)
16. "INVU" – Taeyeon
17. "Deep" – Hyoyeon
18. "Heartbreak" – Minho
19. "Bad Love" – Key
20. "Peaches" - Kai
21. "Shake" – Xiumin
22. "The Greatest" - BoA
23. "Sorry, Sorry" – Super Junior
24. "Bonamana" – Super Junior
25. "Bambina" – Super Junior
26. "Universe (Let's Play Ball)" – NCT U
27. "Resonance" – NCT
28. "Step Back" – Got the Beat
29. "Devil" – Max Changmin
30. "Fever" - Max Changmin
31. "Gasoline" – Key
32. "Glitch Mode" – NCT Dream (day 1 & 2) / "Baby Don't Stop" - NCT U & "Glitch Mode" - NCT Dream (day 3)
33. "Girls" – Aespa
34. "Nectar" - WayV
35. "Feel My Rhythm" – Red Velvet
36. "Kick It" – NCT 127
37. "Better" – BoA
38. "Black Suit" - Super Junior
39. "Hope from Kwangya" – SM Town

== Tour dates ==
Date	City	Country	Venue	Attendance
August 20, 2022	Suwon	South Korea	Suwon World Cup Stadium; Beyond Live	30,000
August 27, 2022	Tokyo	Japan	Tokyo Dome; Beyond Live (Note: August 28 only.)	150,000
August 28, 2022	Tokyo	Japan	Tokyo Dome; Beyond Live	150,000
August 29, 2022	Tokyo	Japan	Tokyo Dome; Beyond Live	150,000
