= Chase (Minho EP) =

- Digital and Complete version cover

EP by Minho
- Released: December 6, 2022
- Studios: Doobdoob (Seoul); SM Big Shot (Seoul); SM LVYIN (Seoul); SM Yellow Tail (Seoul)
- Genres: Hip hop; R&B
- Length: 20:06
- Language: Korean
- Labels: SM; Dreamus

Minho chronology
Chase (2022)	Call Back (2024)

Singles from Chase
- 1. "Chase" Released: December 6, 2022

Chase is the debut extended play by South Korean singer and rapper Minho. It was released on December 6, 2022, through SM Entertainment. Chase was the last in a string of solo debuts by members of the boy group Shinee. It contains six songs belonging to the hip hop and R&B genres, including lead single "Chase". It peaked at number four on South Korea's Circle Album Chart.

== Background ==
Minho debuted as a member of South Korean boy band Shinee in 2008. The other Shinee members, Taemin, Jonghyun, Key and Onew, had already released solo work previously, leaving Minho the final member to go solo. The name Chase was chosen to match the rhyme scheme established by the other members; Taemin's debut solo EP was titled Ace, followed by Jonghyun with Base, then Key with Face and Onew with Voice. The album packaging also shares the same design. Minho described it as "the last piece of the puzzle". He did not originally intend to release a solo EP, but changed his mind after receiving letters from fans following his mandatory military service. Although it is his first EP release, it is preceded by the Korean singles "I'm Home" and "Heartbreak", the latter of which is included on the EP, and the Japanese singles "Romeo and Juliet" and "Falling Free".

== Composition ==
The EP consists of six songs belonging to the hip hop and R&B genres. Lead single "Chase" is a midtempo pop song with hip hop and R&B influences. It combines piano loops and arpeggio synth sounds with a heavy bassline. The lyrics describe the emptiness felt chasing after a figure in a dream and being unable to reach them. "Runaway" features rapper Gemini, and is a hip hop song with a strong 808 bass. The lyrics, written by Minho and Gemini, discuss trying to repair a broken relationship but instead ruining it further. Lim Kim features on R&B track "Waterfall", which contains "dreamy" synths and a relaxed yet heavy bass. The song uses water as a metaphor for falling in love. "Prove It" is an R&B song with rhythmic guitar riffs and various vocal effects. "Choice" is an autobiographical pop R&B song with simple instrumentation, in which Minho reflects on past choices made in his life. "Heartbreak" is a pop song with intense percussion and synth sounds. The lyrics explore the pain caused by a lover who does not take their relationship seriously.

== Release and promotion ==
The EP's title and first concept art were revealed on November 22, 2022. Pre-orders began the same day. Minho hosted a countdown livestream on December 6 to celebrate the EP's digital release. He held a fan meeting, 2022 Best Choi's Minho – Lucky Choi's, at Kyung Hee University on December 7–8, which was also streamed online through the Beyond Live platform. On December 12, Minho hosted another livestream in conjunction with the EP's physical release to provide commentary on its contents.

== Track listing ==
Chase track listing
No.	Title	Lyrics	Music	Arrangement	Length
1.	"Chase" (놓아줘; Noajwo; lit. 'Let Me Go')	Lee Yeon-ji	Kimberly "Kaydence" Krysiuk; Gemini; Kwaca; Imlay	Childish Major; Quintin "Q" Gulledge; Larrance Dopson; Swish; Imlay	3:26
2.	"Runaway" (featuring Gemini)	Minho; Gemini; Kwaca	Greg Bonnick; Hayden Chapman; Tay Jasper	LDN Noise	2:54
3.	"Prove It"	Kang Eun-jeong	Zale Epstein; Josh Cumbee	Epstein; Cumbee	3:03
4.	"Waterfall" (featuring Lim Kim)	Moon Seol-ri	Cha Cha Malone	Malone	3:41
5.	"Choice"	Choi Bo-ra	Tenroc; Feli Ferraro; Benjmn; Boston; Kevin White; Mike Woods	Woods; Tenroc; Boston	3:38
6.	"Heartbreak"	Park Tae-won	Parrish Warrington; Diederik van Elsas; Joren van der Voort; Alex Aiono	Trackside; van der Voort	3:24
Total length:					20:06

== Personnel ==
- Minho – vocals, background vocals (tracks 2, 4–5)
- minGtion – vocal directing (track 1)
- Ju Chan-yang (Pollen) – background vocals (tracks 1, 5)
- Gemini – vocals (track 2), background vocals (tracks 1–2)
- Lee Ji-hong – recording (track 1), digital editing (tracks 2, 4)
- Kwon Yu-jin – digital editing (tracks 1, 3)
- Lee Min-gyu – digital editing (tracks 1, 3), recording (tracks 3, 5)
- Kim Cheol-sun – mixing (tracks 1, 3)
- Kriz – vocal directing (track 2)
- Lee Jeong-bin – recording (tracks 2–3)
- Kang Seon-yeong – digital editing (track 2)
- Nam Gung-jin – mixing (track 2)
- Jeon Seung-woo – vocal directing (tracks 3, 6)
- Kang Tae-woo – background vocals (track 3)
- Kim Jin-hwan – vocal directing (track 4)
- Lim Kim – vocals (track 4), background vocals (track 4)
- Junny – background vocals (track 4)
- No Min-ji – recording (tracks 4, 6)
- Jang Woo-young – digital editing (track 4)
- Gu Jong-pil – mixing (track 4)
- Maxx Song – vocal directing (track 5), Pro Tools operating (track 5)
- Kim Yeon-seo – background vocals (track 5)
- An Chang-gyu – digital editing (tracks 5–6)
- Stay Tuned – mixing (track 5)
- Yelloasis – background vocals (track 6)
- Alex Aiono – background vocals (track 6)
- Joren van der Voort – background vocals (track 6)
- Jeong Yu-ra – digital editing (track 6)
- Jeong Eui-seok – mixing (track 6)
- Kwon Nam-woo – mastering

== Charts ==
=== Weekly charts ===
Weekly chart performance for Chase
Chart (2022)	Peak position
Japanese Digital Albums (Oricon)	6
Japanese Hot Albums (Billboard Japan)	17
South Korean Albums (Circle)	4
UK Album Downloads (Official Charts)	65

=== Monthly charts ===
Monthly chart performance for Chase
Chart (2022)	Peak position
South Korean Albums (Circle)	27

== Sales ==
Sales for Chase
Region	Sales
South Korea	76,139

== Release history ==
Release dates and formats for Chase
Region	Date	Format	Label	Ref.
Various	December 6, 2022	Digital download; streaming	SM	
South Korea	December 12, 2022	CD	SM; Dreamus	
South Korea	December 14, 2022	SMC	SM; Dreamus	
