= Call Back =

- Digital cover

Studio album by Minho
- Released: November 4, 2024
- Studios: Doobdoob (Seoul); SM Big Shot (Seoul); SM Dorii (Seoul); SM Dropolet (Seoul); SM Starlight (Seoul); SM Wavelet (Seoul); SM Yellow Tail (Seoul)
- Genres: K-pop; R&B
- Length: 30:41
- Language: Korean
- Label: SM

Minho chronology
Chase (2022)	Call Back (2024)	Tempo (2025)

Singles from Call Back
- 1. "Call Back" Released: November 4, 2024

Call Back is the first studio album by South Korean singer and rapper Minho. It was released on November 4, 2024, through SM Entertainment. The album contains ten songs, including the lead single, "Call Back".

== Composition ==
The album opens with lead single "Call Back", a pop song about confessing one's feelings that incorporates heavy bass, lyrical piano and upbeat guitar riffs. It is followed by "Slow Down", an R&B pop song with trap elements layered over "dreamy" synths. The lyrics express Minho's wish for time to pass slowly when he is with his partner. "Fireworks" features Sohee of Riize, and is a hip hop dance song with a rhythmic bassline. It conveys a positive message about lighting a fire under one's self despite the exhaustion of daily life. "Came and Left Me" is a dance-pop song that opens with a restrained guitar riff and transitions to a more rapid rhythm. The lyrics are about coming to terms with a break-up. "Something About U" contains heavy kick and bass. It describes wanting to get closer to someone. "Round Kick" is an R&B dance-pop song that features energetic chanting, 2000s-esque electric guitar riffs, brass and synths. "Affection" is an Afrobeat-based R&B pop song, marking Minho's first foray into the Afrobeat genre. It compares falling in love to being gradually submerged by a deep sea. "I Don't Miss You" is an R&B pop song that combines acoustic guitar, intense bass and kick sounds. Minho sing-raps as though repeating to himself that he doesn't miss the other person. Ningning of Aespa features on R&B track "Because of You". The song contains metaphorical lyrics about a break-up, and includes lyrical guitar, mandolin and 808 bass. The final track, "Would You Mind", is an R&B song about an unforgettable love, featuring synths and heavy bass.

== Release and promotion ==
On October 15, 2024, SM Entertainment announced that Minho would release his first studio album, Call Back, on November 4, stating that it would "prove the expansion of his musical spectrum". The album contains ten songs, including the lead single of the same name, and comes two years after his first EP, Chase. On October 23, Minho revealed the album's track list through a video uploaded to Shinee's social media accounts, including audio snippets of the songs "Fireworks" and "Because of You". A few days later, he launched a promotional website which displayed a video of Minho driving a car with songs from the album playing in the background. Minho hosted a live event to discuss the album on November 3, which was also broadcast through online platforms such as YouTube, TikTok and Weverse. He held his first solo concert, titled Mean: Of My First, at the Hwajeong Tiger Dome in Seoul on November 30 – December 1.

== Track listing ==
Call Back track listing
No.	Title	Lyrics	Music	Arrangement	Length
1.	"Call Back"	Jo Yoon-kyung	Jeppe Engelbrecht Appel; Emil Lagoni; Line Gade	Appel; Lagoni	3:18
2.	"Slow Down"	Lee Seu-ran	Jeppe London Bilsby; Lauritz Emil Christiansen; William Segerdahl; Jsong	Bilsby; Christiansen	2:43
3.	"Fireworks" (featuring Sohee of Riize)	Tomboy1	QSTNMRKS; Matt Rist; Tim Cook; Justin Starling; Miles Barker; Hautboi Rich; TMM	QSTNMRKS; Rist; Cook	3:04
4.	"Came and Left Me"	Jo	Louis Samson; Frederik Leopold; Jeppe Pilgaard	Pilgaard	3:03
5.	"Something About U"	Park Tae-won	Ryan S. Jhun; Hanif Hitmanic Sabzevari; Dennis DeKo Kordnejad; Jop Pangemanan; Sebastian Garcia	Jhun; Hitmanic; Kordnejad	3:14
6.	"Round Kick"	Bang Hye-hyun	Jhun; Cesar Peralta; Ryan Curtis	Jhun; Peralta	3:17
7.	"Affection"	Mola	Angela Mukul; David Karbal; Kristoffer Winkler; Perrin Xthona	Karbal	2:47
8.	"I Don't Miss You"	Lee Hyeong-seok (PNP)	Ori Rose; David Schaeman; Orion Meshorer; David Hugo	Schaeman; Meshorer	3:06
9.	"Because of You" (featuring Ningning of Aespa)	Lee Hyeong-seok	Novodor; Niko the Kid; Fraser Churchill; Maya K	Novodor; Niko the Kid	3:09
10.	"Would You Mind"	Danke	Rasmus Gregersen; Cutfather; Daecolm Diego Holland; Frederik Jyll	Gregersen; Cutfather	3:00
Total length:					30:41

== Credits and personnel ==
Credits adapted from the album's liner notes.

Studio

- SM Big Shot Studio – recording (track 1, 5–7), digital editing, engineered for mix, mixing (track 6–7)
- SM Dorii Studio – recording (track 1–3, 5–7, 10), digital editing, engineered for mix (track 2, 10)
- Doobdoob Studio – recording (track 1–3, 6–7, 9), digital editing (track 3)
- SM Droplet Studio – recording (track 3, 9), digital editing, engineered for mix (track 5)
- SM Yellow Tail Studio – recording, digital editing (track 4)
- SM Starlight Studio – recording (track 8–9), digital editing (track 1, 9), engineered for mix (track 1, 8), mixing (track 4, 8)
- SM Wavelet Studio – recording (track 8, 10)
- SM Blue Ocean Studio – mixing (track 1)
- SM Concert Hall Studio – mixing (track 2, 10)
- KLANG Studio – mixing (track 3, 9)
- SM Blue Cup Studio – mixing (track 5)
- 821 Sound – mastering (all tracks)

Personnel

- Minho – vocals, background vocals (all tracks)
- Sohee – vocals, background vocals (track 3)
- Ningning – vocals (track 9)
- Emil Lagoni – background vocals (track 1)
- William Segerdahl – background vocals (track 2)
- Justin Starling – background vocals (track 3)
- Miles Barker – background vocals (track 3)
- Frederik Leopold – background vocals (track 4)
- Jop Pangemanan – background vocals (track 5)
- Sebastian Garcia – background vocals (track 5)
- Cesar Peralta – background vocals (track 6)
- Ryan Curtis – background vocals (track 6)
- Angela Mukul – background vocals (track 7)
- David Karbal – background vocals (track 7)
- Perrin Xthona – background vocals (track 7)
- Ori Rose – background vocals (track 8)
- Daecolm Diego Holland a.k.a. Daecolm – background vocals (track 10)
- Ju Chan-yang (Pollen) – vocal directing (track 1–2, 4–6), background vocals (track 4)
- Jeon Seung-woo – vocal directing (track 2)
- Maxx Song – vocal directing (track 3, 5, 7)
- Paprikaa – vocal directing (track 3)
- MinGtion – vocal directing (track 8, 10)
- Emily Yeonseo Kim – vocal directing, background vocals (track 9)
- Kim Bo-ah – background vocals (track 1, 7)
- Kang Seok-joo – background vocals (track 1, 9)
- Oiaisle – background vocals (track 2, 7–8, 10)
- Xydo – background vocals (track 3)
- Andrew Choi – background vocals (track 5–6)
- Lee Min-kyu – recording (track 1, 5–7), digital editing, engineered for mix, mixing (track 6–7)
- Jeong Jae-won – recording (track 1–3, 5–7, 10), digital editing, engineered for mix (track 2, 10)
- Kim Ji-hyun – recording (track 1, 9)
- Eugene Kwon – recording (track 2–3, 6–7), digital editing (track 3)
- Kim Joo-hyun – recording (track 3, 9), digital editing, engineered for mix (track 5)
- Noh Min-ji – recording, digital editing (track 4)
- Jeong Yoo-ra – recording (track 8–9), digital editing (track 1, 9), engineered for mix (track 1, 8), mixing (track 4, 8)
- Kang Eun-ji – recording (track 8, 10)
- Kim Cheol-sun – mixing (track 1)
- Nam Koong-jin – mixing (track 2, 10)
- Koo Jong-pil – mixing (track 3, 9)
- Jung Eui-seok – mixing (track 5)
- Kwon Nam-woo – mastering (all tracks)

== Charts ==
=== Weekly charts ===
Weekly chart performance for Call Back
Chart (2024)	Peak position
Japanese Albums (Oricon)	28
Japanese Combined Albums (Oricon)	45
Japanese Hot Albums (Billboard Japan)	33
South Korean Albums (Circle)	6

=== Monthly charts ===
Monthly chart performance for Call Back
Chart (2024)	Position
South Korean Albums (Circle)	29
