= Choi Phillip =

South Korean actor (born 1979)

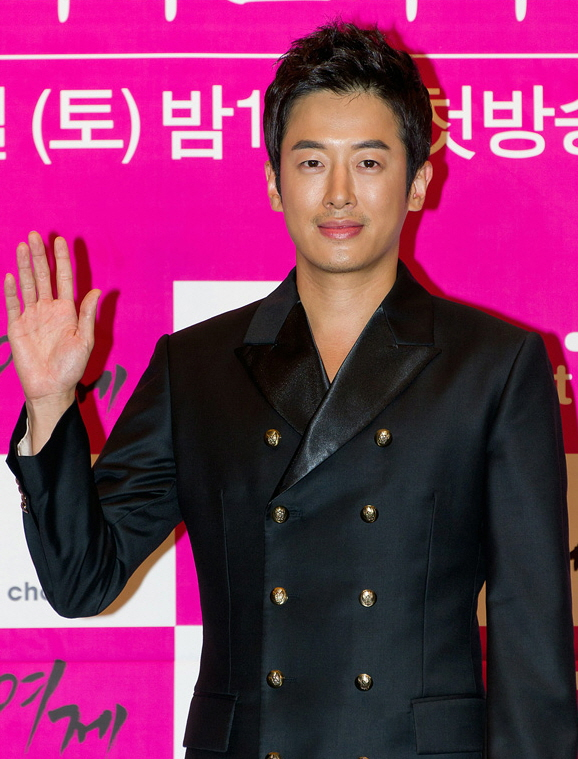
- Choi in September 2011
- Born: Choi Pil-soon; 18 August 1979 (age 47); Seoul, South Korea
- Occupation: Actor
- Years active: 2005–present
- Agent: Now Entertainment
- Children: 2

Korean name
- Hangul: 최필순
- Hanja: 崔弼淳
- RR: Choe Pilsun
- MR: Ch'oe P'ilsun

Stage name
- Hangul: 최필립
- RR: Choe Pilrip
- MR: Ch'oe P'illip

Choi Phillip (Korean: 최필립; born 18 August 1979), birth name Choi Pil-soon (최필순), is a South Korean actor.

== Filmography ==
=== Television series ===
Year	Title	Role	Notes/Ref.
2005	Young-jae's Golden Days	Phillip Kang	
2006	Soulmate	Phillip	
2007	Capital Scandal	Yamashita Kouji	
2007	Cannot Hate You	Yoon Hyun-soo	
2007	Medical Gibang Cinema	Woon	
2008	Detective Mr. Lee	Lee Yoon-seok	
2008	Star's Lover	Kang Woo-jin	
2008	Our Happy Ending		Cameo
2010	The Daughters-in-law of a Global Family	Third son	
2010	KBS Drama Special: Pianist	Han Jung-woo	
2011	The Empress	Park Hyung-il	
2013	The Fugitive of Joseon	Min Do-saeng	
2013	Case Number 113	Lee Gyeo-ra	
2013	Let's Eat	Catholic church oppa	Cameo (episode 11)
2014	High School King of Savvy	Park Heung-bae	
2014	Rosy Lovers	Go Jae-dong	
2014	Drama City: The Reason I Get Drunk		
2015	Tomorrow Victory	Cha Sun-woo	
2018	A Pledge to God	Hwang Ma-ri	
2023	My Gold, My Jade	Eun Sang-soo	

=== Film ===
Year	Title	Role
2011	Head	Announcer (cameo)
2011	Blind	Detective from Information Section
2013	The Cravings	Section chief Choi Pil-soon
2014	Campus S Couple	Chan-seung
2015	Hiya	Gi-nam

=== Variety show ===
Year	Title	Notes/Ref.
2012	Star Love Village - Season 3	
2013	The Soldier	Cast member
2016	King of Mask Singer	A Little Indian Boy (Episode 53)

== Theater ==
Year	Title	Role
	Woman 1,2,3	
	솟대위의 앉은 새들	
	초행길	
	Baudelaire's Women	
2009	Nasaengmun	Musa ("warrior")
2010	Sanae Watanabe	Park Man-chun
2011	The Golden Days	Seok Joo-myung
