= Pianist (KBS Drama Special) =

- KBS Drama Special episode
- Episode no.: Season 1 Episode 24
- Directed by: Moon Joon-ha
- Written by: Park Eun-young
- Original air date: November 27, 2010
- Running time: 73 minutes

Episode chronology
| ← Previous "Hurry Up and Tell Me" | Next → "Young-deok Women's Wrestling Team" |

"Pianist" (Korean: 피아니스트) is the twenty-fourth episode of the first season of the South Korean anthology series KBS Drama Special. Starring Choi Min-ho and Han Ji-hye, it aired on KBS2 on November 27, 2010.

== Plot ==
21-year-old Oh Je-ro is a musical genius, but in order to support his sick father, he's worked for years at a piano factory as a tuner. He despairs of ever being given a chance to learn how to play the piano, and thinks the name his father gave him sounds like "Oh, Zero," signifying his lack of hope in the future. This changes when he meets and falls in love with Yoon In-sa, a 30-year-old music teacher in a school. In-sa dreamed of becoming the world's greatest pianist when she was young, but she was also forced to give up her dreams because of her poor circumstances. Instead, she leads an exhausting life as a part-time music teacher at an elementary school. A piano will bring these two souls together, as they share their dreams, hopes, pain and eventually heal each other.

== Cast ==
- Choi Min-ho as Oh Je-ro
- Han Ji-hye as Yoon In-sa
- Choi Phillip as Han Jung-woo
- Jo Hee-bong

== Rating ==
| Episode | Broadcast date | TNmS ratings | |
| Episode | Broadcast date | Average audience share | |
| Episode | Broadcast date | Entire Country | Seoul Capital Area |
|---|---|---|---|
| 1 | November 27, 2010 | 7.6% | 8.3% |
