= Tempo (single album) =

- Digital cover

Single album by Minho
- Released: December 15, 2025
- Genre: K-pop
- Length: 6:01
- Language: Korean
- Label: SM

Minho chronology
Call Back (2024)	Tempo (2025)	Make It Hot (2026)

Singles from Tempo
- 1. "Tempo" Released: December 15, 2025

Tempo is the first single album by South Korean singer and rapper Minho. It was released on December 15, 2025, through SM Entertainment. It consists of two tracks, including the lead single, "Tempo".

== Composition ==
The album consists of two songs: lead single "Tempo" and album track "You're Right". "Tempo" is a dance song with 808 bass and various rhythm instruments. The lyrics describe approaching someone at their own pace. Minho said that it was his favourite among all the singles he had released. He had originally intended to save it for his next album, but was concerned it would be taken by another SM Entertainment artist. "You're Right" is an easy-listening R&B pop song containing acoustic guitar. It delivers a message of comfort and support to loved ones. Minho had previously performed the song during his 2024 Asia concert tour.

== Release and promotion ==
On December 1, 2025, SM Entertainment announced that Minho would release a new single album titled Tempo, a year after his first studio album, Call Back. Pre-orders began that day, and teaser images were later uploaded to Shinee's official social media accounts depicting Minho as a biker. Minho performed the title track for the first time at his fan meeting, 2025 Best Choi's Minho: Our Movie, ahead of the album's release on December 15. He promoted the album with performances on Show! Music Core and the MBC Gayo Daejejeon, which he also hosted.

== Track listing ==
Tempo track listing
No.	Title	Lyrics	Music	Arrangement	Length
1.	"Tempo"	Lee Seu-ran	Elias Edman; Henrik Heaven; Louise Lindberg; Omar Rudberg	Edman	2:45
2.	"You're Right"	Hyun Ji-won	Erick Serna; Matt Simons; Becca Krueger; Hautboi Rich	Serna	3:16
Total length:					6:01

== Personnel ==
- Minho – vocals
- Ju Chan-yang (Pollen) – vocal directing (track 1)
- Riskypizza – background vocals (track 1)
- Henrik Heaven – background vocals (track 1)
- Jeong Yu-ra – recording, digital editing, engineering for mix, mixing (track 2)
- Jeong Eui-seok – mixing (track 1)
- MinGtion – vocal directing (track 2)
- Oiaisle – background vocals (track 2)
- Matt Simons – background vocals (track 2)
- Kang Eun-ji – digital editing (track 2)
- Kwon Nam-woo – mastering

== Charts ==
=== Weekly charts ===
Weekly chart performance for Tempo
Chart (2025–2026)	Peak position
Japan (Oricon)	9
Japan Top Singles Sales (Billboard Japan)	12
South Korean Albums (Circle)	3

=== Monthly charts ===
Monthly chart performance for Tempo
Chart (2025)	Peak position
South Korean Albums (Circle)	23
