= Derailed (2016 film) =

- Official Poster
- Directed by: Lee Seong-Tae
- Screenplay by: Lee Seong-Tae
- Produced by: Kim Sang-su
- Starring: Ma Dong-seok; Choi Min-ho
- Cinematography: Ji Seung-woo
- Edited by: Kim Gyung-jin
- Music by: Park Ki-heon
- Production company: MCMC
- Distributed by: Cine Guru – Kidari Ent Corp.
- Release dates: October 2016 (Busan IFF); November 30, 2016
- Running time: 91 mins
- Country: South Korea
- Language: Korean
- Box office: US$409,851

Derailed (Korean: 두 남자; RR: Du namja; lit. 'Two Men'), also known as No Way to Go, is a 2016 South Korean action crime film starring Ma Dong-seok and Choi Min-ho. The film was displayed at the 21st Busan International Film Festival in the "Korean Cinema Today – Panorama" section. The film was released in the cinemas in South Korea on November 30, 2016.

== Plot ==
Jin-il (Choi Min-ho) is the leader of a gang of four runaway youths who survive by odd jobs and petty crime. Ga-young (Jung Da-Eun) decides to run a prostitution scam by luring men and then having the Jin-il and Bong-gil steal from the client. When she tries the scam for the first time, her client Hyung-suk (Ma Dong-seok) has no interest having sex with her but says he helps young people like her by giving them a job in his karaoke bar (where they will be expected to be prostitutes). When the two boys come, Hyung-suk starts to beat them up but is overpowered and they steal his car and wallet. When the gang tries to sell the car that night/early morning, Jin-il and Ga-young recognise and are recognised by the buyer Sung-hoon, Ga-young's former boyfriend who was jailed for murder (but released early due to coming from a rich family) after being informed on by Jin-il; they run away.

Later that night Hyung-suk manages to track down the gang and abducts Jin-il and Ga-young. Under duress, after beating Jin-il, Hyung-suk forces Ga-young to sign a contract to work in his bar until his car is paid off which Jin-il starts to do in installments by committing more crimes. Hyung-suk also manages to track down Sung-hoon who has disposed of the car and from whom Hyung-suk demands payment. Sung-hoon wants to know where Jin-il is but despite repeated requests, Hung-suk denies knowing. Sung-hoon uses his own henchmen to trackdown Hyung-suk's apartment and offers Hyng-suk payment for Jun-il's location.

During a failed scam with Jin-il to get money for stolen cellphones (there were none) from other criminals, Bong-gil is accidentally stabbed by his own knife and ends up in police custody when released from hospital. Jin-il is arrested at the same time and seeing his friend there confesses to all the crimes as a lone actor. He informs the police that Hyung-suk's bar is a front for a brothel with underage prostitutes. A police sting using Jin-il on the bar fails, as Hyung-suk has removed Ga-young and pretends not to know Jin-il, and Jin-il escapes police custody. Hyung-suk phones his henchman to say that they will release Ga-young soon as she's more trouble than she's worth. However, before she is released Jin-il follows Hyung-suk, learns he has a daughter, and kidnaps her.

Jin-il demands Hyung-suk release Ga-young which Hyung-suk agrees to do. Hyung-suk contacts Sung-hoon saying where Ga-young will be and to follow her to Jin-il. Ga-young arrives at the top of a train station and Jin-il hugs her saying he will be going away for a long time since the police are waiting for him. When Sung-hoon arrives on the rooftop he attempts to abduct Ga-young with his henchmen and attacks Jin-il. Having secured his daughter, Hyung-suk goes to the rooftop and frees Ga-young, attacks Sung-hoon and goes to attack Jin-il for abducting his daughter but stops when Ga-young intervenes. Sung-hoon hears the police sirens and taunts Jil-in saying they will meet again alone when released from prison. Jin-il staggers and pushes Sung-hoon over the rooftop railing while carrying himself over too. The pair fall several stories. (Jin-il is seen moving weakly before the credits roll so it is not clear if he and/or Sung-hoon die.)

== Cast ==
=== Main cast ===
- Ma Dong-seok as Hyung-suk
- Choi Min-ho as Jin-il

=== Supporting cast ===
- Kim Jae-young as Sung-hoon
- Jung Da-eun as Ga-young
- Lee You-jin as Seon Bong-gil
- Baek Soo-min as Min-kyung
- Kim Won-sik as Won-sik
- Park Ho-san as Chief detective
- Park Ki-deok as Park Ki-deok
- Kil Sung-sub as Kil Sung-sub
- Lee Shi-yoo as Hyung-suk's wife
- Song Ga-yeon as Hyung-suk's daughter
- Han Sung-Chun as Detective Kim
- Park Seong-il as Detective Park
- Seo Ho-chul as Detective Seo
- Kim Wang-geun as Detective's Team leader
- Ahn Jae-won as Jae-won, Sung-hoon's gang
- Lee Tae-gyu as Tae-kyu, Sung-hoon's gang
- Choi Yeong-min Yeong-min, Sung-hoon's gang
- Lee Chang-hoon as a guy
- Hyun Bong-sik as Big guy friend
