= Make It Hot (EP) =

- Digital cover

EP by Minho
- Released: September 7, 2026
- Genre: K-pop
- Length: 17:36
- Language: Korean
- Label: SM

Minho chronology
Tempo (2025)	Make It Hot (2026)

Singles from Make It Hot
- 1. "Make It Hot" Released: September 7, 2026

Make It Hot is the second extended play (EP) by South Korean singer-rapper Minho. It was released on September 7, 2026, through SM Entertainment. It contains six songs, including the lead single, "Make It Hot".

== Composition ==
The EP opens with lead single "Make It Hot", a mixture of dance-pop and EDM that features "exotic" percussion rhythms and heavy bass. It describes growing closer to a partner in the heat. It is followed by dance-pop track "Liquid", a collaboration with Kiss of Life member Belle. It contains a synth-based melody and rhythmic bass, with lyrics about becoming one. "Love Me Now" is an Afro-house-based dance song about letting go of a past relationship. "Time 1.1" is a synth-infused dance-pop song about moving forward at one's own pace, even in uncertain circumstances. "Out of My Hands" is an R&B hip hop song about trusting one's choices and facing the future with confidence. It features heavy bass and an "addictive" hook. Finally, "Ending Scene" is a midtempo R&B song with guitar riffs, acoustic percussion and synths about the ending of a long-term relationship.

== Release and promotion ==
On August 18, 2026, SM Entertainment confirmed that Minho would release his second EP, Make It Hot, later that month, nine months after his single album Tempo. Preorders began on the same day. Concept images and videos were released depicting Minho in a variety of settings, such as a swimming pool and a sauna. The EP was released on September 7, and Minho hosted a countdown livestream on Shinee's official YouTube channel to commemorate its release. He promoted the EP with performances of the lead single on music shows, including M Countdown, Music Bank, Show! Music Core and Inkigayo.

== Track listing ==
Make It Hot track listing
No.	Title	Lyrics	Music	Arrangement	Length
1.	"Make It Hot"	Bang Hye-hyun; Lee Seu-ran	Henrik Heaven; Axel Lindroth; Håvard Sundland	Axel Lindroth; Håvard Sundland	2:37
2.	"Liquid" (featuring Belle of Kiss of Life)	Moon Yeo-reum	Jonatan Gusmark; Ludvig Evers; Anne Judith Wik; Marcus Gunnarsen; Martinus Gunnarsen	Moonshine	3:07
3.	"Love Me Now"	Lee Seu-ran	Ryan S. Jhun; Aaron Smith; Anthony Dirksen; Raffie van Maren	Ryan S. Jhun; Anthony Dirksen; Raffie van Maren	3:17
4.	"Time 1.1"	Hyun Ji-won	Ryan S. Jhun; Patrick "J. Que" Smith; Jonas Jurstrom; Brandon Hamlin; Jack Samson	Ryan S. Jhun; Jonas Justrom; B Ham	2:42
5.	"Out of My Hands"	Jonjon (XYXX); Park Tae-won	Brandon Hamlin; Tido; Marcus "MarcLo" Lomax; Dawit Kamal Wilson	Tido; B Ham	3:05
6.	"Ending Scene"	Lee Hyung-seok (PNP)	Azad Naficy; Dante Jones; Mitchell Ryan Bell	Azad Naficy; Dante Jones	2:48
Total length:					17:36

== Charts ==
Chart performance for Make It Hot
Chart (2026)	Peak position
Japanese Albums (Oricon)	23
Japanese Combined Albums (Oricon)	66
Japanese Download Albums (Billboard Japan)	10
Japanese Top Albums Sales (Billboard Japan)	21
South Korean Albums (Circle)	9
