= Heartbreak (Minho song) =

2021 single by Minho

Single by Minho
- Language: Korean
- Released: December 21, 2021
- Recorded: 2021
- Studio: SM Yellow Tail (Seoul)
- Genre: K-pop
- Length: 3:24
- Label: SM
- Composers: Parrish Warrington; Diederik Van Elsas; Joren Van Der Voort; Alex Aiono
- Lyricist: Park Tae-won
- Producers: Trackside; Joren Van Der Voort

Minho singles chronology
"I'm Home" (2019)	"Heartbreak" (2021)	"Romeo and Juliet"/"Falling Free" (2022)

Music video
- "Heartbreak" on YouTube

"Heartbreak" is a song recorded by South Korean singer and rapper Minho released digitally on December 21, 2021 through SM Entertainment. The song was written by Park Tae-won, Parrish Warrington, Diederik Van Elsas, Joren Van Der Voort, and Alex Aiono, and produced by Trackside. The song was included on Minho's debut extended play Chase, which was released on December 6, 2022.

== Release and promotion ==
Promotional materials for "Heartbreak", including image teasers and the music video teaser, were revealed via Shinee's social media accounts beginning December 13, 2021. Minho showcased the song for the first time at his Beyond Live fan meeting, Best Choi's Minho 2021, on the same day.

== Charts ==
Weekly chart performance for "Heartbreak"
Chart (2021)	Peak position
South Korea (Gaon)	144
US World Digital Song Sales (Billboard)	9

== Release history ==
Release history and formats for "Heartbreak"
Region	Date	Format	Label	Ref.
Various	December 21, 2021	Digital download; streaming	SM; Dreamus	
