= The Story of Light (Shinee album) =

- Cover of the compilation album

Studio album by Shinee
- Released: May 28, 2018
- Recorded: 2017–2018
- Studios: S.M. Studios, Seoul, South Korea
- Genres: K-pop; R&B; tropical house
- Length: 55:00
- Languages: Korean; English
- Labels: SM; iRiver

Shinee chronology
Shinee The Best From Now On (2018)	The Story of Light (2018)	Don't Call Me (2021)

Singles from The Story of Light
- 1. "Good Evening" Released: May 28, 2018; 2. "I Want You" Released: June 11, 2018; 3. "Our Page" Released: June 25, 2018; 4. "Countless" Released: September 10, 2018

The Story of Light is the sixth studio album by South Korean boy group Shinee. It consists of three EPs that were later collected together in the repackage album, The Story of Light: Epilogue. This album release marks the group's first in South Korea since 1 of 1 in November 2016, and the first since member Jonghyun's death in December 2017, though he appears on the bonus track "Lock You Down".

== Background and release ==
Reports of a Shinee comeback first surfaced in May 2017, where it was stated that Shinee would be one of four SM groups returning in the second half of 2017. However, no further updates were provided. In May 2018, SM Entertainment announced Shinee would return with a new album to celebrate the group's tenth anniversary, including a fan meeting on May 27, 2018. It marks the group's first release since the repackaged album 1 and 1 in November 2016, and the first since member Jonghyun died in December 2017. Shinee's sixth full-length album, titled The Story of Light, was confirmed to be divided into three parts with each part consisting of five songs and separate lead singles. Member Key noted that the reason why they wanted to release three lead singles is to show that the group is still here, working hard and doing well in coping with things as they are, referring to the grief they suffered from Jonghyun's death.

The first part of the album, led by the lead single "Good Evening", was released on May 28. The second part of the trilogy was released on June 11 with the single "I Want You". According to the group, the second part of the album represents the group's view of themselves, while the first part reflected what others think of them. The third and last part of the album is fronted by the single "Our Page" and was released on June 25. On August 1, 2018, Shinee released the Japanese version of "Good Evening" and "I Want You" as part of their fifteenth Japanese single, "Sunny Side". On September 10, 2018, the group released the finale of their tenth anniversary album series, a repackaged album titled The Story of Light: Epilogue featuring sixteen tracks, including its lead single "Countless" and past singles "Good Evening", "I Want You" and "Our Page".

== Composition ==
"Good Evening" is a deep house song, similar to Shinee's 2015 song "View", with classic R&B sounds. It interpolates 112's 1997 song "Cupid". "I Want You" is a tropical house tune that offers a more energetic vibe than its previous single. The third part of the album is led by the track "Our Page" and is described as a medium-tempo R&B song, which is in stark contrast to the tracks from previously released parts like "Good Evening" and "I Want You". "Our Page" is written by Shinee's members and songwriter Kenzie. Onew, Taemin, Key, and Minho participated in writing the lyrics with Jonghyun in mind. The song contains the message, "This unfinished novel, we'll fill it until the last page". Additionally, "Our Page" is titled "The Words You Left Behind" in Korean and according to SM Entertainment, reflects the group's message of "We will be together until the end". The song also incorporates references to the group being a five-member act and their debut date, May 25, 2008. The special track "Lock You Down" also contains Jonghyun's voice.

== Artwork ==
The album artwork utilizes the five traditional Korean colors, or obangsaek: yellow, red, blue, white and black. Key explained that they wanted to show "basic-but-Shinee style", as opposed to the "very complicated, different colors" that had previously featured in the group's imagery. The artwork was designed by SM's creative director Min Hee-jin, who used the three primary colors and basic shapes to convey "continuity and permanence". Unusually for a K-pop album, the cover does not depict the group themselves, instead taking a more conceptual approach.

== Music video ==
The music video of "Good Evening" uses a color scheme consisting of green, blue and pearl aqua. It shows the four members and their dancers perform on a set filled with forestry, film equipment, and various other items. The video also features a more laid-back choreography atop of chairs, and gives off a sense of almost accidental flailing and falling motions. It was choreographed by Japanese dancer Koharu Sugawara, who had previously worked on Taemin's solo tracks like "Sayonara Hitori" (2016) and "Move" (2017). Like "Good Evening", the music video for "I Want You" features a CGI fox and also showcases old school green screen graphics recalling '80s sci-fi tropes. While "Good Evening" features loose choreography, the dance moves to "I Want You" are more playful and tightly angled. The accompanying music video to "Our Page" shows the four members working on their own and doing various activities before they eventually come together to perform the song atop of stairs with a fifth mic standing and left untouched. The music video for "Countless" depicts the members interacting with a variety of retro objects in a vibrantly colored, aqua-accented space, before assembling for the chorus.

== Promotion ==
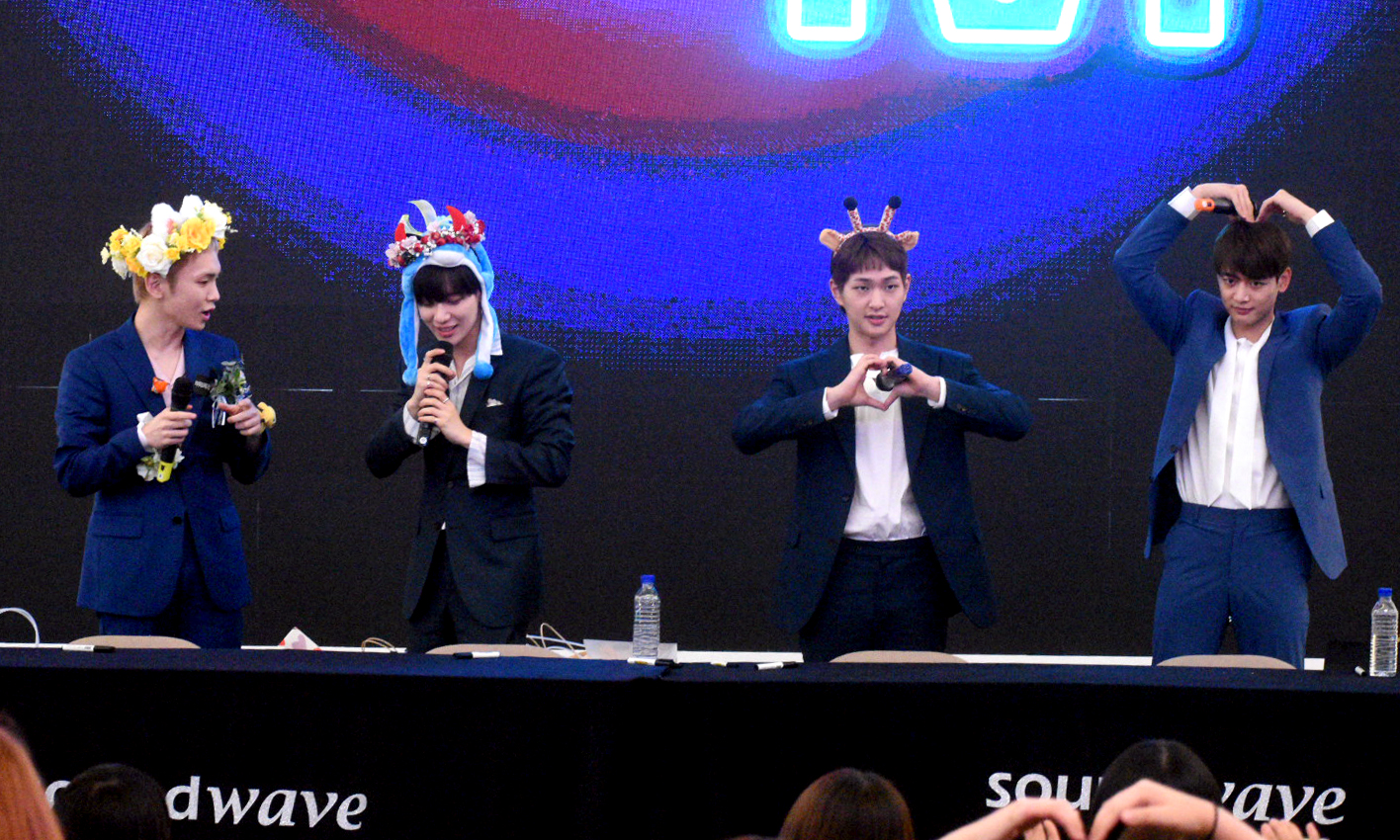
Shinee at an autograph event for The Story of Light in Goyang on June 29, 2018

On May 31, 2018, Shinee began their promotional performances for the first part of their sixth album, performing their lead single, "Good Evening", and "All Day All Night" on Mnet's M Countdown. The group also performed on KBS2's Music Bank and MBC's Show! Music Core during their promotional cycle. The group also appeared on Radio Star to promote their new album on May 30, 2018. They used the opportunity to open up about the death of their bandmate Jonghyun, stating that it was painful to be asked if they were feeling okay from everyone they met after the incident, which is why the members requested their fans and people around them to treat them the way they used to before to help them acknowledge Jonghyun's death and move on with their lives. Member Minho admitted they had struggled after the tragic loss, but were willing to move forward.

== Commercial performance ==
The Story of Light: EP.1 earned Shinee their highest peak on Billboard's Heatseekers Albums chart and their eighth top five entry on World Albums. According to Nielsen Music, it sold 2,000 copies in the US in the week ending June 1. The first and second EPs made a double appearance on the World Albums chart on June 20, 2018. The Story of Light: EP.2 debuted at number four, while The Story of Light: EP.1 ranked at number eleven for its third week on the chart. The double appearance of different albums from one act on World Albums makes the group the fifth K-pop act to score two simultaneous entries on the chart for the same week.

== Track listing ==
The Story of Light: Epilogue – full album track listing
No.	Title	Lyrics	Music	Arrangement	Length
1.	"All Day All Night"	Kenzie	Delly Boi (Joombas); Davey Nate (Joombas); Peter Tambakis	Joombas	3:19
2.	"Countless" (셀 수 없는; Sel Su Eomneun)	Jeon Gan-di	Jamil "Digi" Chammas; Adrian McKinnon; Jeremy "Tay" Jasper; Sara Forsberg; Leven Kali; MZMC; Yoo Young-jin	Jamil "Digi" Chammas	3:09
3.	"Good Evening" (데리러 가; Derireo Ga; lit. 'Going to you')	Jo Yoon-kyung; Minho; Key	Chaz Mishan; David Delazyn; Bryan Antayvious Jackson; Arnold Hennings; Daron Jones; Michael Keith; Quinnes Parker; Marvin Scandrick; Courtney Sills; Yoo Young-jin	The Fliptones	3:43
4.	"Chemistry"	Jo Yoon-kyung; Minho	Andrew Choi; Deez (Soultriii); Yunsu (Soultrii)	Soultriii	3:36
5.	"Electric"	Hwang Yoo-bin	G'harah "PK" Degeddingseze (80hdmuzic); Matt Wong (The Heavyweights); Jamie Jones (The Heavyweights); Jarah Lafayette Gibson; Hanna Asres-Jones; Victor Portillo	The Heavyweights	3:24
6.	"Who Waits for Love" (독감; Dokkam; lit. 'Flu')	Seo Ji-eum; Deepflow	Hyuk Shin (Joombas); Ross Lara (Joombas); Dave Cook (Joombas); JJ Evans (Joombas); Jeff Lewis	Joombas	3:51
7.	"Our Page" (네가 남겨둔 말; lit. 'The Words You Left Behind')	Shinee; Kenzie	Mike Woods (Rice N' Peas); Kevin White (Rice N' Peas); Andrew Bazzi (Rice N' Peas); MZMC; Yoo Young-jin	Rice N' Peas	3:59
8.	"I Say"	Blue Bus; Gaho; Lee Ji-eun (Music Cube); Gu Seul-yoon (Music Cube)	Blue Bus; Gaho	Blue Bus; Gaho	3:10
9.	"Retro"	Jo Yoon-kyung	Andreas Öberg; Simon Petrén; Gustav Karlström; Deez	Andreas Öberg; Simon Petrén; Gustav Karlström; Deez	3:05
10.	"Drive"	Ku Tae-woo	Gannin Arnold; Andy Delos Santos	Gannin Arnold	3:09
11.	"I Want You"	Jung Joo-hee	Mike Woods (Rice N' Peas); Kevin White (Rice N' Peas); Andrew Bazzi (Rice N' Peas); MZMC; eSNa; Jeremy "Tay" Jasper; Yoo Young-jin	Rice N' Peas	3:05
12.	"Undercover"	Seo Ji-eum	Deez; Andrew Choi; Alexander Karlsson (JeL); Alexej Viktorovitch (JeL)	JeL	3:10
13.	"Jump"	Hwang Yoo-bin	Curtis Richardson (WayBetta); Adien Lewis (WayBetta); Charlie Brown; Jerome Williams	Waybetta; Charlie Brown; Jerome Williams	3:44
14.	"Tonight"	Jo Yoon-kyung; Minos	Hyuk Shin (Joombas); MRey (Joombas); JJ Evans (Joombas); Jeff Lewis	Joombas	3:51
15.	"You & I" (안녕; Annyeong; lit. 'Goodbye')	Key	Choi Jin-seok; Ronny Svendsen; Anne Judith Wik; Nermin Harambašić; Martin Mullholland; Cazzi Opeia (Sunshine)	Dsign Music	3:04
16.	"Lock You Down" (Special Track)	Brian Kim (ZigZag Note); Jo Yoon-kyung	Jonathan Yip; Ray Romulus; Jeremy Reeves; Ray Charles McCullough II; August Rigo	The Stereotypes	3:17
Total length:					55:00

Notes

- "Good Evening" contains an interpolation of "Cupid" performed by 112.

The Story of Light – EP.1
No.	Title	Lyrics	Music	Arrangement	Length
1.	"All Day All Night"	Kenzie	Delly Boi (Joombas); Davey Nate (Joombas); Peter Tambakis	Joombas	3:19
2.	"Good Evening" (데리러 가; Derireo Ga; lit. 'Going to you')	Jo Yoon-kyung; Minho; Key	Chaz Mishan; David Delazyn; Bryan Antayvious Jackson; Arnold Hennings; Daron Jones; Michael Keith; Quinnes Parker; Marvin Scandrick; Courtney Sills; Yoo Young-jin	The Fliptones	3:43
3.	"Undercover"	Seo Ji-eum	Deez; Andrew Choi; Alexander Karlsson (JeL); Alexej Viktorovitch (JeL)	JeL	3:10
4.	"Jump"	Hwang Yoo-bin	Curtis Richardson (WayBetta); Adien Lewis (WayBetta); Charlie Brown; Jerome Williams	Waybetta; Charlie Brown; Jerome Williams	3:44
5.	"You & I" (안녕; Annyeong; lit. 'Goodbye')	Key	Choi Jin-seok; Ronny Svendsen; Anne Judith Wik; Nermin Harambašić; Martin Mullholland; Cazzi Opeia (Sunshine)	Dsign Music	3:04
6.	"Good Evening" (Instrumental)		Chaz Mishan; David Delazyn; Bryan Antayvious Jackson; Arnold Hennings; Daron Jones; Michael Keith; Quinnes Parker; Marvin Scandrick; Courtney Sills; Yoo Young-jin	The Fliptones	3:43
Total length:					20:43

The Story of Light – EP. 2
No.	Title	Lyrics	Music	Arrangement	Length
1.	"I Want You"	Jung Joo-hee	Mike Woods (Rice N' Peas); Kevin White (Rice N' Peas); Andrew Bazzi (Rice N' Peas); MZMC; Esna; Jeremy "Tay" Jasper; Yoo Young-jin	Rice N' Peas	3:05
2.	"Chemistry"	Jo Yoon-kyung; Minho	Andrew Choi; Deez; Yunsu (SOULTRiii)	SOULTRiii	3:36
3.	"Electric"	Hwang Yoo-bin	G'harah "PK" Degeddingseze (80hdmuzic); Matt Wong (The Heavyweights); Jamie Jones (The Heavyweights); Jarah Lafayette Gibson; Hanna Asres-Jones; Victor Portillo	The Heavyweights	3:24
4.	"Drive"	bKu Tae-woo	Gannin Arnold; Andy Delos Santos	Gannin Arnold	3:09
5.	"Who Waits for Love" (독감; Dokkam; lit. 'Flu')	Seo Ji-eum; Deepflow	Hyuk Shin (Joombas); Ross Lara (Joombas); Dave Cook (Joombas); JJ Evans (Joombas); Jeff Lewis	Joombas	3:51
6.	"I Want You" (Instrumental)		Mike Woods (Rice N' Peas); Kevin White (Rice N' Peas); Andrew Bazzi (Rice N' Peas); MZMC; Esna; Jeremy "Tay" Jasper; Yoo Young-jin	Rice N' Peas	3:05
Total length:					20:10

The Story of Light – EP. 3
No.	Title	Lyrics	Music	Arrangement	Length
1.	"Our Page" (네가 남겨둔 말; lit. 'The Words You Left Behind')	Shinee; Kenzie	Mike Woods (Rice N' Peas); Kevin White (Rice N' Peas); Andrew Bazzi (Rice N' Peas); MZMC; Yoo Young-jin	Rice N' Peas	3:59
2.	"Tonight"	Jo Yoon-kyung; Minos	Hyuk Shin (Joombas); MRey (Joombas); JJ Evans (Joombas); Jeff Lewis	Joombas	3:51
3.	"Retro"	Jo Yoon-kyung	Andreas Öberg; Simon Petrén; Gustav Karlström; Deez	Andreas Öberg; Simon Petrén; Gustav Karlström; Deez	3:05
4.	"I Say"	Blue Bus; Gaho; Lee Ji-eun (Music Cube); Gu Seul-yoon (Music Cube)	Blue Bus; Gaho	Blue Bus; Gaho	3:10
5.	"Lock You Down" (Special Track)	Brian Kim (ZigZag Note); Jo Yoon-kyung	Jonathan Yip; Ray Romulus; Jeremy Reeves; Ray Charles McCullough II; August Rigo	The Stereotypes	3:17
6.	"Our Page" (Instrumental)		Mike Woods (Rice N' Peas); Kevin White (Rice N' Peas); Andrew Bazzi (Rice N' Peas); MZMC; Yoo Young-jin	Rice N' Peas	3:59
Total length:					21:35

== Charts ==
Chart performance for The Story of Light
Chart (2018)	Peak position			
Chart (2018)	EP.1	EP.2	EP.3	Epilogue
French Download Albums (SNEP)	45	81	60	—
Japan Hot Albums (Billboard Japan)	6	6	9	19
Japanese Albums (Oricon)	7	8	18	8
New Zealand Heatseeker Albums (RMNZ)	5	—	—	—
South Korean Albums (Gaon)	1	1	2	1
UK Digital Albums (OCC)	80	—	—	—
US Heatseekers Albums (Billboard)	2	5	11	—
US World Albums (Billboard)	4	4	4	9

== Accolades ==
Decade-end lists
Critic/Publication	List	Rank	Ref.
Billboard	The 25 Greatest K-Pop Albums of the 2010s	11	

Music program wins
Song	Program	Date	Ref.
"Good Evening"	The Show	June 5, 2018	
"I Want You"	M Countdown	June 21, 2018	

== Release history ==
Release dates and formats for The Story of Light
Region	Date	Edition(s)	Format(s)	Label(s)	Ref.
South Korea	May 28, 2018	EP.1	CD; digital download; streaming	SM Entertainment; iRiver	
South Korea	June 11, 2018	EP.2	CD; digital download; streaming	SM Entertainment; iRiver	
South Korea	June 25, 2018	EP.3	CD; digital download; streaming	SM Entertainment; iRiver	
South Korea	September 10, 2018	Epilogue	CD; digital download; streaming	SM Entertainment; iRiver	
