= Choi Min-ho =

South Korean entertainer (born 1991)

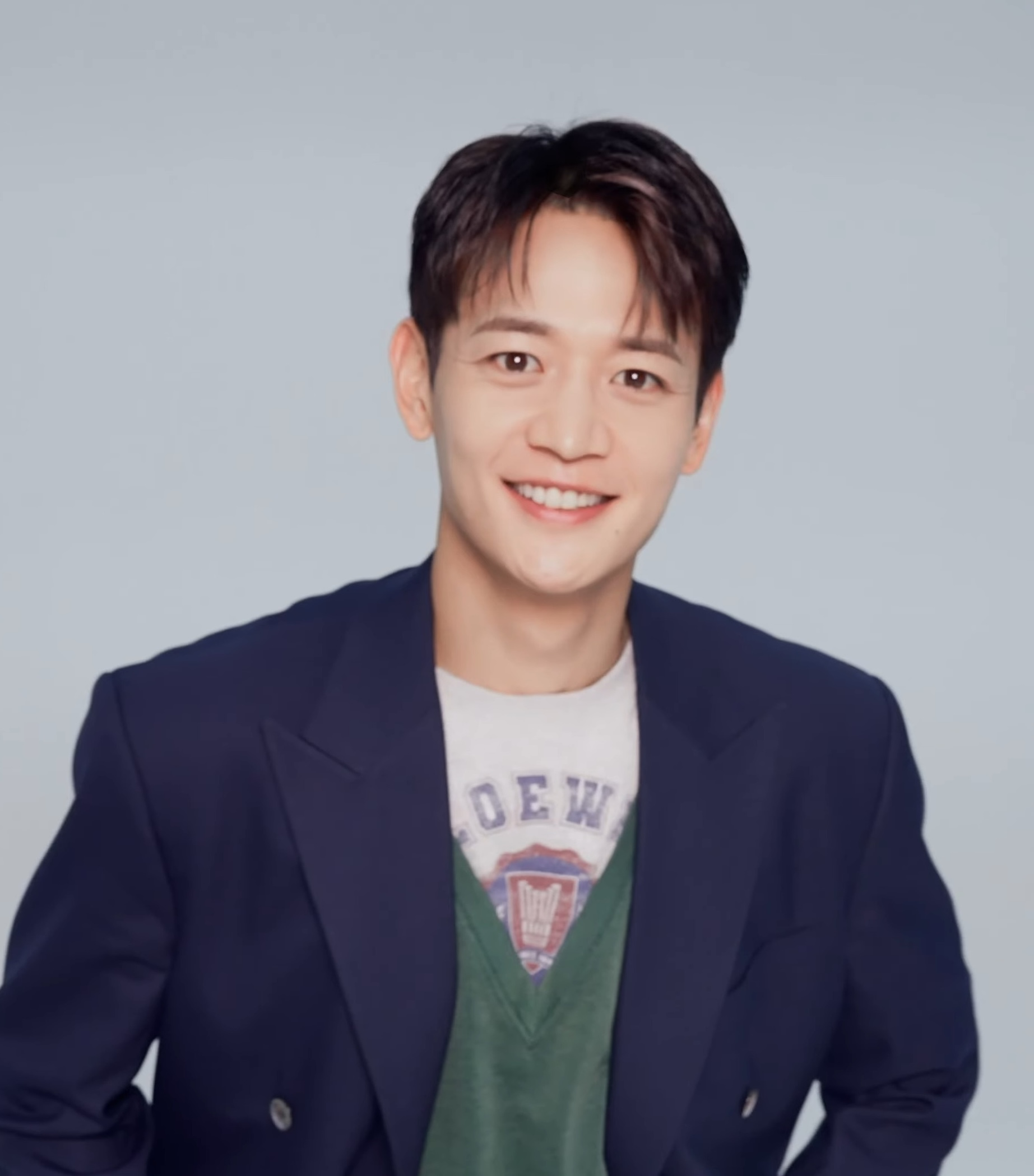
- Choi in 2025
- Born: December 9, 1991 (age 34); Incheon, South Korea
- Occupations: Singer; rapper; songwriter; actor
- Father: Choi Yun-kyum
- Musical career
- Genre: K-pop
- Instrument: Vocals
- Years active: 2008–present
- Label: SM
- Member of: Shinee
- Website: Official website

Korean name
- Hangul: 최민호
- Hanja: 崔珉豪
- RR: Choe Minho
- MR: Ch'oe Minho

Signature
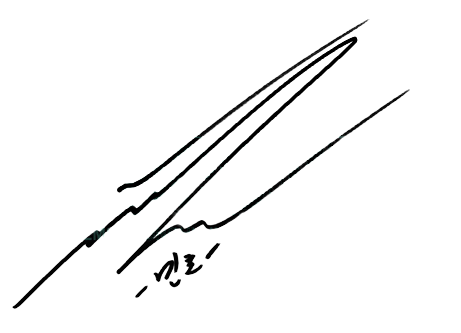

Choi Min-ho (Korean: 최민호; pronounced [tɕʰø.min.ho]; born December 9, 1991), known mononymously as Minho, is a South Korean singer, songwriter, rapper and actor. In May 2008, he debuted as a member of South Korean boy band Shinee which later became one of the best-selling Korean artists. Aside from group activities, he debuted as an actor in November 2010 in KBS2's drama special Pianist. He has since landed roles in television series such as Salamander Guru and The Shadows (2012), To the Beautiful You (2012), Medical Top Team (2013), My First Time (2015), and Hwarang: The Poet Warrior Youth (2016). He made his feature film debut in 2016 with Canola. As a soloist, he has released the digital singles "I'm Home" (2019) and "Heartbreak" (2021). He released his debut solo EP Chase in 2022.

== Career ==
=== 2008–2009: Career beginnings and Shinee ===
Choi was discovered at the SM Casting System in 2006 and modeled for Ha Sang-beg's Seoul Collection F/W 08–09 in March 2008. One month later, Choi was chosen as a member of the group Shinee. The five-member boy group debuted on May 25, 2008, on SBS' Inkigayo. The group's first EP, Replay, was released on May 22 and debuted on the Korean music charts MIAK at number ten, peaking at number eight.

Choi began participating in the rap making of Shinee's songs with their first studio album The Shinee World, under the guidance of rap instructor JQ. JQ praised Choi's writing ability and pointed out that he has many good ideas and "a few genius moments here and there". He was especially pleased with Choi's rap lyrics for Shinee's 2009 single "Juliette".

In 2009 and 2010, Choi appeared in both the Korean and Japanese versions of Girls' Generation's music video "Gee". He was also featured in the music video of VNT's debut song "Sound" in 2010. In 2009, Choi joined the popular show Let's Go! Dream Team as a regular cast member.

=== 2010–2015: Acting debut ===
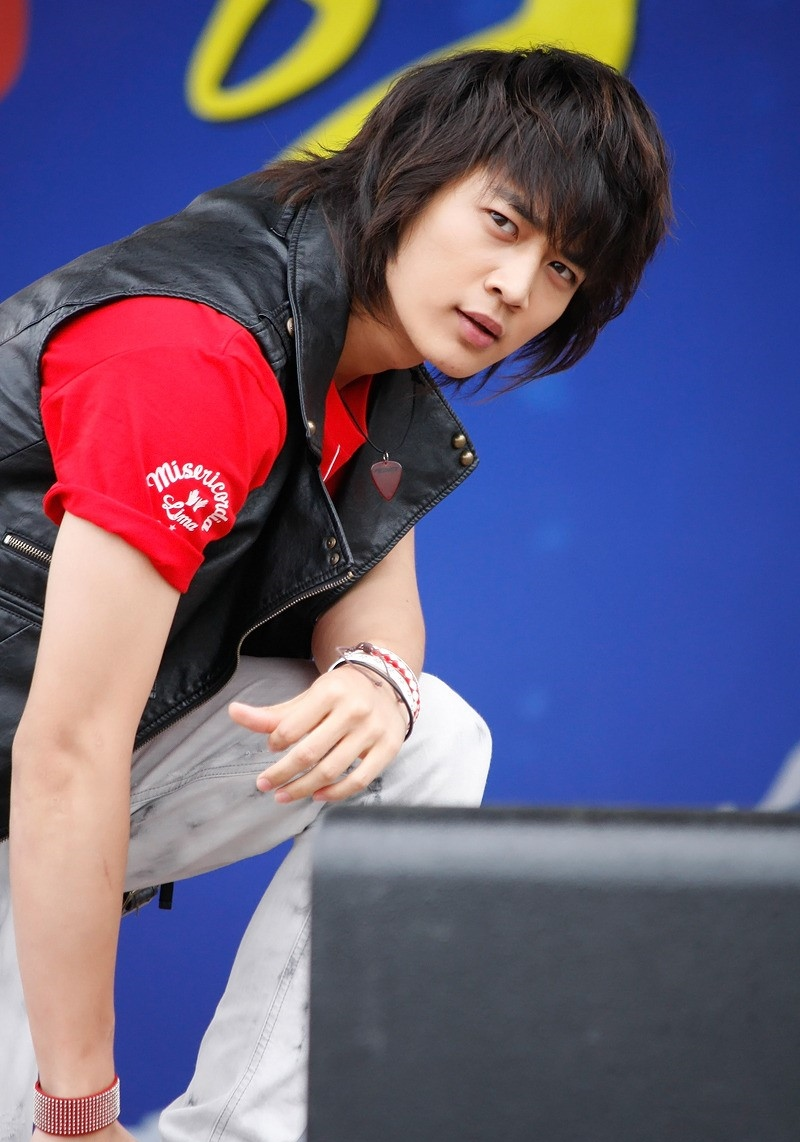
Choi in 2010

In 2010, Choi joined the variety show Oh! My School as a cast member and began hosting the music program Show! Music Core alongside bandmate Onew, Miss A member Suzy and T-ara member Jiyeon. He made his acting debut in KBS2's drama special, entitled Pianist, with actress Han Ji-hye. In 2011, Choi was cast in SBS' sitcom, Salamander Guru and The Shadows. He played the role of a genius hacker.

In 2012, Choi was confirmed to take on the lead role, alongside f(x)'s Sulli and Lee Hyun-woo, in To the Beautiful You, a Korean adaptation of the manga Hana-Kimi. The drama started broadcasting on August 15, 2012, on SBS. In preparation for his role as a high jump gold medalist, Choi received personal training from coach Kim Tae-young, former national high jump athlete and a member of the Korea Association of Athletics Federations, for a month and a half. In December 2012, Choi joined dance project group SM The Performance alongside labelmates from TVXQ, Super Junior, Shinee, and Exo.

Choi began hosting the variety show Mamma Mia in April 2013, but departed after a month due to Shinee's touring schedule. He resumed his role as an MC on Show! Music Core after a two-year absence, this time hosting alongside Kim So-hyun and Noh Hong-chul. In July 2013, Choi returned to the small screen with MBC's Medical Top Team. His performance received a positive response and was praised for his growth as an actor. In August, he participated in the reality series Star Diving Show Splash, but it was cancelled after four episodes after several contestants were injured.

In 2015, Choi was cast as the lead in OnStyle's drama My First Time together with actress Park So-dam, which was broadcast in September. It was the first drama premiered by OnStyle, with a total of eight episodes.

=== 2016–2020: Big screen debut, solo music and military enlistment ===
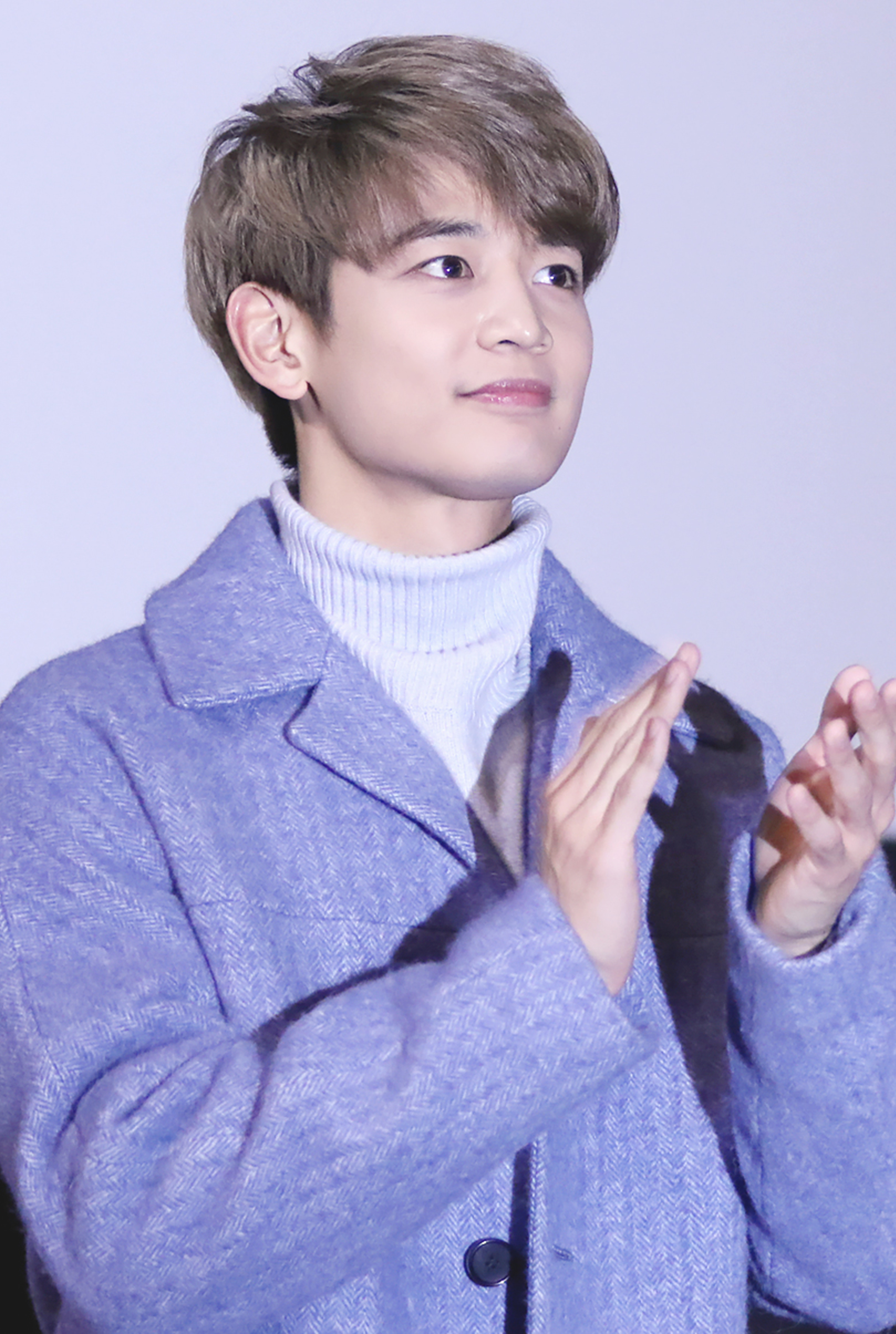
Choi at the press conference for the movie Derailed in November 2016

In early 2016, Choi extended his popularity as an actor. He was cast in several projects, including a historical Korean drama entitled Hwarang: The Poet Warrior Youth, which began airing on December 19, 2016, on KBS2. His debut movie project titled Canola, alongside Youn Yuh-jung and Kim Go-eun and directed by Yoon Hong-seung (pseudonym Chang), was filmed in 2015 and released on the big screen in May 2016. He was cast in a supporting role in a film entitled The Princess and the Matchmaker, led by Lee Seung-gi and Shim Eun-kyung. The movie is the second installment in a planned trilogy by Jupiter Films after the 2013 box-office hit The Face Reader. Choi was then cast in the movie Derailed alongside veteran actor Ma Dong-seok, which was directed by Lee Seong-tae and premiered at the 2016 Cannes Film Festival. The movie had its world premiere screening at the 21st Busan International Film Festival in October 2016.

In 2017, Choi took part in the JTBC web drama entitled Somehow 18 alongside Lee Yu-bi. As a result of high online viewer ratings, the web drama was broadcast on television through JTBC. After receiving a positive response for his acting performance in Derailed, Choi was cast in science fiction action thriller Illang: The Wolf Brigade, the Korean adaptation of the Japanese anime Jin-Roh: The Wolf Brigade. Choi stated that he chose the role because he wanted to work with director Kim Jee-woon. The film released on July 25, 2018. In September 2017, Choi received the Special Award at the Indonesian Television Awards 2017 due to his widespread popularity in the country as well as for his performances in various dramas. Choi was the first Korean artist to be presented an award at the show. On November 15, Choi was included in Vogue's list of the "Sexiest Men Alive". Later that year, Choi was cast in a four episode mini drama The Most Beautiful Goodbye, which is a remake of the 1996 drama of the same name.

In March 2019, Choi released his debut solo single, "I'm Home", as part of SM Station. He then enlisted for the Marine Corps on April 15 as part of his mandatory military service, where he was recognized as an "exemplary marine soldier" for forgoing early discharge to participate in defense drills. He completed his military service on November 15, 2020.

=== 2021–present: Further acting roles, Chase and Call Back ===
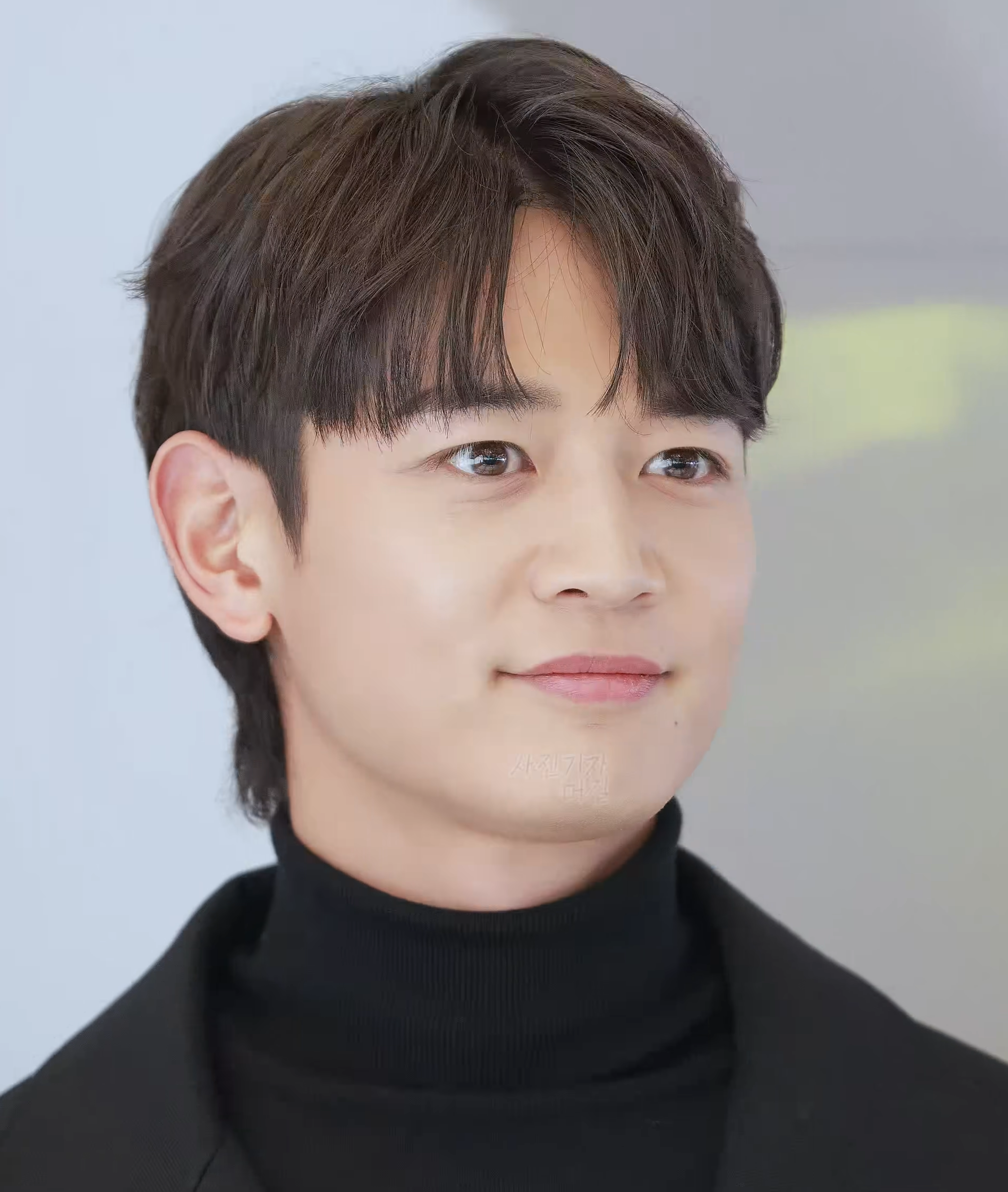
Choi in January 2022

In January 2021, Choi resumed activities as part of Shinee. He also ramped up participation in various shows including a special appearance in web series Lovestruck in the City and main role in reality show Law of the Jungle – Pioneers. In September 2021, Choi debuted as a radio host on Naver Now's broadcast of Best Choice, a sports talk-variety show where Choi, well known as an "athletic idol", delivered sports news and talked with fans and various guests about "his favorite things". He made a special appearance in Yumi's Cells as Chae Woo-gi, the titular character's coworker and crush. Choi released the digital single "Heartbreak" on December 21.

He appeared in the horror film New Normal, directed by Jeong Beom-sik. It was selected as the closing film of the 26th Bucheon International Fantastic Film Festival. His first Japanese songs, "Romeo and Juliet" and "Falling Free", were digitally released on August 24. He released his debut solo EP, Chase, on December 6, 2022. Choi starred in the Netflix series The Fabulous alongside Chae Soo-bin later that month. He held his first fan concert, 2024 Best Choi's Minho Fan-Con Multi-Chase, on January 6–7, 2024, at Jangchung Arena in Seoul. He also released the digital single "Stay for a Night". In August 2024, he starred in the JTBC drama Romance in the House. In September, he appeared in his first play, Waiting for Waiting for Godot, alongside Lee Soon-jae. He portrayed the role of Val, an understudy continually waiting to go on stage; however, the production was cut short due to Lee's health issues.

Choi released his first studio album, Call Back, on November 4, 2024. He held his first solo concert, Mean: Of My First, later that month, at the Hwajeong Tiger Dome in Seoul. He later held shows in Taiwan, Japan, Macau and the Philippines. He appeared in the play Rendezvous in April 2025. In September, he resumed his role as Val in a new production of Waiting for Waiting for Godot. He participated in the sports reality show Rising Eagles, captaining a celebrity basketball team. He released the single album Tempo on December 15. He released his second EP, Make It Hot, on September 7, 2026.

== Personal life ==
"I wanted to become a professional football player like my dad, [...] But when I was a fifth grader, he told me he would kick me out of the house if I pursue that dream. That was the first time he disapproved of something I did so I decided to give up the dream."

— Minho about his dreams and the relationship with his father.

Choi graduated from Konkuk University's affiliated high school on February 10, 2010. After taking the college admissions test the previous year, he was admitted in 2010 to Konkuk's part-time admittance for the arts and culture film major and graduated in 2015. His father, Choi Yun-kyum, is a well-known South Korean soccer coach. Choi inherited his father's ability and showed his skills in shows like KBS2's Our Town's Physical Variety and won high praise from Lee Young-pyo, a retired member of the national team. Choi also led his team to victory at the Idol Futsal World Cup Competition. Originally, Choi wanted to become a professional football player like his father but he disapproved of his decision stating: "Frankly, I didn't want him to follow my path, [...] Back when I was playing, it was difficult to make it in that world, very abusive back in those days. I would stay home for a couple of hours and then be off to training camp. It pained me to see my son asking me to stay over for the night." His father also added that from the football manager's point of view, he didn't think his son had it in him to make it in that field, stating Minho is a strong-willed person, but has a small frame.

== Other ventures ==
=== Endorsements ===
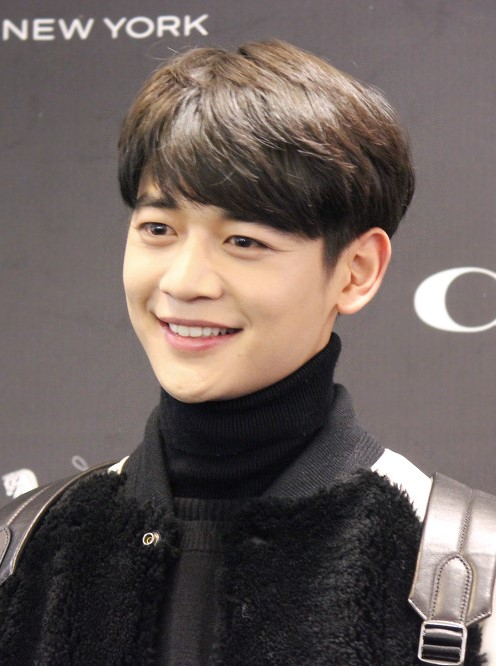
Choi at a Coach event in 2015

Choi has endorsed numerous brands and has been listed among the highest paid advertising models in South Korea, reportedly receiving 300 million won as his annual advertising rate. Food company Our Home selected Choi as its first solo advertising model due to his "healthy and bright image". He appeared in advertising for SK Telecom, promoting its LTE network. In 2015, Choi was selected as a model for luxury fashion brand Coach alongside Choi Soo-young and Victoria Song, as part of a global project targeting people in their twenties. He attended the Coach 2016 S/S fashion show in New York. In 2017, he became the face of outdoor brand K2, promoting its sportswear line, and casual wear brand Andew. He attended Givenchy's 2018 fashion show in Paris, where he was listed among the best dressed celebrities. The same year, Choi was chosen as the official face of the Korea Sale Festa, the largest shopping event in Korea, becoming the first-ever Korean idol to promote it.

Pernod Ricard Korea announced in January 2022 that they selected Ju Ji-hoon and Choi as the new brand ambassadors of the modern classic scotch whisky brand Ballantine's and launched the new global campaign "Time Well Spent". The following year, he was named the new face of Godiva, and participated in campaigns for Valentine's Day and White Day. In 2025, he became the advertising model for the McDonald's McSpicy Shanghai Burger.

=== Philanthropy and ambassadorships ===
In 2011, Choi was named an Honorary Ambassador for Youth by South Korea's Ministry of Gender Equality and Family. He was chosen for the role because he embodied the policy goals of "healthy physical growth" and "cultivation of a sound mind". He has participated in several campaigns for UNICEF. In 2014, Choi and Girls' Generation member Yoona were appointed as ambassadors for Uniheroes, a fundraising branch of UNICEF. He later took part in UNICEF's "#Imagine" campaign, which was first introduced in November 2014 to commemorate the 25th anniversary of the United Nations' Convention on the Rights of the Child. In 2022, the Korea Creative Content Agency, together with the Ministry of Culture, Sports and Tourism, unveiled the second part of their immersive cultural project "Age of Light", in which Choi appeared as a virtual figure in the artificial intelligence experience booth, "Gwanghwa In". In March 2023, he donated 5 million won to Cheongju North Chungcheong Province for the love hometown project.

Choi has supported multiple campaigns promoting sport. In November 2017, Choi, alongside First Lady of the United States Melania Trump, attended the "Girls Play 2" campaign at the US embassy in Korea, an event organised to promote the 2018 Winter Olympics. In July 2021, the Korean Professional Football Federation appointed Choi as one of five K-League Ambassadors to help promote the league to the public. He was selected as an "Olympic friend" by the International Olympic Committee to promote the 2024 Winter Youth Olympics in Gangwon. He participated in the Olympic torch relay in Chuncheon on December 5, and later attended the 2024 Summer Olympics in Paris. He was appointed as an ambassador for the Korean Sport & Olympic Committee, with the aim of promoting the 2026 Winter Olympics.

== Discography ==
=== Studio albums ===
List of studio albums, showing selected details, chart positions and sales
Title	Details	Peak chart positions			Sales
Title	Details	KOR	JPN	JPN Hot	Sales
Call Back	Released: November 4, 2024; Label: SM Entertainment; Formats: CD, digital download, streaming	6	28	33	KOR: 87,383; JPN: 2,889

=== Extended plays ===
List of extended plays, showing selected details, chart positions and sales
Title	Details	Peak chart positions			Sales
Title	Details	KOR	JPN	JPN Hot	Sales
Chase	Released: December 6, 2022; Label: SM Entertainment; Formats: CD, digital download, streaming	4	—	17	KOR: 76,139
Make It Hot	Released: September 7, 2026; Label: SM Entertainment; Formats: CD, digital download, streaming	9	23	—	KOR: 78,163; JPN: 1,684

=== Single albums ===
List of single albums, showing selected details
Title	Details	Peak chart positions		Sales
Title	Details	KOR	JPN	Sales
Tempo	Released: December 15, 2025; Label: SM Entertainment; Formats: CD, digital download, streaming	3	9	KOR: 25,918; JPN: 2,871

=== Singles ===
Title	Year	Peak chart positions		Album
Title	Year	KOR	US World	Album
"I'm Home" (그래)	2019	— (Note: "I'm Home" did not enter the Gaon Digital Chart, but peaked at number 65 on the component Download Chart.)	12	SM Station Season 3
"Heartbreak"	2021	144	9	Non-album singles
"Romeo and Juliet"	2022	—	—	Non-album singles
"Falling Free"	2022	—	—	Non-album singles
"Chase" (놓아줘)	2022	94	—	Chase
"Stay for a Night"	2024	—	—	Non-album single
"Call Back"	2024	12	—	Call Back
"Tempo"	2025	—	—	Tempo
"Make It Hot"	2026	82	—	Make It Hot
"—" denotes releases that did not chart or were not released in that region.

=== Music videos ===
Title	Year	Director(s)	Ref.
"I'm Home" (그래)	2019	Unknown	
"Heartbreak"	2021	96Wave	
"Chase" (놓아줘)	2022	96Wave	
"Stay for a Night"	2024	SOZE Yoon (Studio Ga.Ze)	
"Call Back"	2024	Shin Hee-won (st-wt)	
"Tempo"	2025	Han Daehee	

=== Songwriting credits ===
All songwriting credits are adapted from the Korea Music Copyright Association's database and liner notes unless otherwise noted.

List of songs credited as lyricist
Song	Year	Artist	Album	Co-written with
"Love's Way"	2008	Shinee	The Shinee World	Wheesung, JQ (Makeumine Works)
"Love Like Oxygen"	2008	Shinee	The Shinee World	Young-hu Kim, Kwon Yoon-jung, JQ
"One for Me"	2008	Shinee	The Shinee World	Wheesung, JQ
"Graze"	2008	Shinee	The Shinee World	Kim Jeong-bae, JQ, John Hyunkyu Lee
"Best Place"	2008	Shinee	The Shinee World	Hong-seok, Park Hae-hyung, JQ
"Juliette"	2009	Shinee	Romeo	Jonghyun
"Get Down"	2009	Key & Minho (feat. Luna)	2009, Year of Us	Minho, Key, JQ, Bigtone, Ryan S. Jhun, Script Shepherd, Antwann Frost
"Obsession"	2010	Shinee	Lucifer	Jonghyun
"Shout Out"	2010	Shinee	Lucifer	JQ, Shinee, Misfit
"Wowowow"	2010	Shinee	Lucifer	Kim Jin-hee, JQ
"Your Name"	2010	Shinee	Lucifer	Onew
"Hello"	2010	Shinee	Hello	Kim Eana
"One"	2010	Shinee	Hello	Park Sung-soo
"Get It"	2010	Shinee	Hello	Ceejay (Fresh Boys), Gilme, Key
"Alarm Clock"	2012	Shinee	Sherlock	Jonghyun
"Stranger"	2012	Shinee	Sherlock	Kim Jeong-bae
"Honesty"	2012	Shinee	Sherlock	Jonghyun
"Dream Girl"	2013	Shinee	The Misconceptions of Us	Jeon Gan-di
"Girls, Girls, Girls"	2013	Shinee	The Misconceptions of Us	Jeon Gan-di, Key
"Beautiful"	2013	Shinee	The Misconceptions of Us	Tesung Kim (Iconic Sounds)
"Dynamite"	2013	Shinee	The Misconceptions of Us	Kim Boo-min
"Shine" (Medusa I)	2013	Shinee	The Misconceptions of Us	Misfit
"Orgel"	2013	Shinee	The Misconceptions of Us	Jonghyun, Key
"Excuse Me Miss"	2013	Shinee	The Misconceptions of Us	Kim Boo-min, JQ
"Sleepless Night"	2013	Shinee	The Misconceptions of Us	Max Changmin
"Better Off"	2013	Shinee	The Misconceptions of Us	Jonghyun
"Destination"	2013	Shinee	Everybody	Jeon Gan-di
"Close the Door"	2013	Shinee	Everybody	Jinbo (Superfreak Records)
"Colorful"	2013	Shinee	Everybody	Jeon Gan-di, Key
"Romance"	2015	Shinee	Odd	Kim In-hyung
"Farewell My Love"	2015	Shinee	Odd	Jeon Ji-eun, Hwang Seon-jeong, Kim Jeong-mii (January 8th lalala Studio)
"Don't Let Me Go"	2016	Shinee	1 of 1	Jo Yoon-kyung, Key
"Lipstick"	2016	Shinee	1 of 1	Oh Min-joo
"Don't Stop"	2016	Shinee	1 of 1	Jonghyun, Key
"U Need Me"	2016	Shinee	1 of 1	Agnes Shin (MonoTree)
"Good Evening"	2018	Shinee	The Story of Light	Jo Yoon-kyung, Key
"Chemistry"	2018	Shinee	The Story of Light	Jo Yoon-kyung
"Our Page"	2018	Shinee	The Story of Light	Shinee, Kenzie
"Sunny Side"	2018	Shinee	Non-album single	Shinee
"I'm Home"	2019	Minho	SM Station Season 3	Jayins, Soo-chang, Lim Soo-ah
"Area"	2021	Shinee	Atlantis	JQ, Cha Yoo-bin, Lee Yeon-ji
"Runaway"	2022	Minho (feat. Gemini)	Chase	Gemini, Kwaca
"Stay for a Night"	2024	Minho	Non-album single	Kang Eun-yu, Mola, Thama, Cho Yun-kyoung

== Filmography ==
=== Film ===
Year	Title	Role	Notes	Ref.
2012	I Am	Himself	SM Town documentary	
2015	SM Town the Stage	Himself	SM Town concert film	
2016	Canola	Han-i		
2016	Derailed	Jin-il		
2018	The Princess and the Matchmaker	Seo Ga-yoon	Special appearance	
2018	Illang: The Wolf Brigade	Kim Cheol-jin		
2019	The Battle of Jangsari	Choi Seung-pil	Second installment in a trilogy following Operation Chromite	
2023	New Normal	Hoon	Closing film at 26th BIFF	

=== Television ===
Year	Title	Role	Notes	Ref.
2008	My Precious You	Himself	Special appearance	
2010	Pianist	Oh Je-ro	KBS Drama Special	
2012	Salamander Guru and The Shadows	Choi Min-hyuk	Sitcom	
2012	To the Beautiful You	Kang Tae-joon		
2013	Medical Top Team	Kim Seong-woo		
2015	My First Time	Yoon Tae-oh		
2016	Drinking Solo	Himself	Cameo	
2016–2017	Hwarang: The Poet Warrior Youth	Kim Soo-ho		
2017	Somehow 18	Oh Kyung-hwi		
2017	The Most Beautiful Goodbye	Jung Soo	Four-episode mini series	
2020–2021	Lovestruck in the City	Oh Dong-sik	Cameo	
2021	Yumi's Cells	Chae Woo-gi	Special appearance	
2022	The Fabulous	Ji Woo-min		
2024	Romance in the House	Nam Tae-pyeong		

=== Variety shows ===
Year	Title	Role	Notes	Ref.
2009–2012	Dream Team	Main cast		
2010	Oh! My School	Main cast		
2013	Mamma Mia	Host		
2013	Star Diving Show Splash	Contestant		
2010–2011	Show! Music Core	Host	with Bae Suzy, Onew, Park Ji-yeon	
2013–2015	Show! Music Core	Host	with Kim So-hyun, Noh Hong-chul, Zico, N, Yeri	
2015	Exciting India	Main cast		
2021	Law of the Jungle – Pioneers	Main cast		
2021	Extreme Debut: Wild Idol	Trainer Corps		
2021	Legendary Actors	Main cast	Chuseok special program	
2021–2022	King of Golf Season 2	Main cast	episode 1–13	
2022	Run for the Money: Battle Royal	Contestant		
2025	Rising Eagles	Main cast		

=== Web shows ===
Year	Title	Role	Notes	Ref.
2022	Chang Min-ho's Buddy Buddy	Host	with Changmin	
2023	Bros On Foot	Cast member	with Ju Ji-hoon, Ha Jung-woo, and Yeo Jin-goo	
2023	Webtoon Singer	Host	with Yoo Se-yoon and Jang Do-yeon	

=== Radio ===
Year	Title	Role	Ref.
2021	Best Choice	Host	
2023	Kim Eana's Starry Night	Special DJ	

=== Hosting ===
Year	Title	Notes	Ref.
2011	Hallyu Dream Concert	with Park Shin-hye and Ok Taec-yeon	
2013	MBC Korean Music Wave in Bangkok	with Nichkhun, Jo Kwon, Park Ji-yeon, and Bae Suzy	
2014	28th Golden Disc Awards	with Jung Yong-hwa, Yoon Doo-joon, Taeyeon, Tiffany Young, Oh Sang-jin	
2016	Korean Popular Culture and Arts Awards	with Han Chae-ah	
2017	One K Global Peace Concert	with Kim Seol-hyun (at Manila, Philippines)	
2018	DMC Korean Music Festival	with Jo Bo-ah	
2018	Bucheon International Fantastic Film Festival	with Lim Ji-yeon	
2018	MBC Gayo Daejejeon	with Noh Hong-chul, Lim Yoona, Cha Eun-woo	
2023	32nd Seoul Music Awards	with Kim Il-joong and Lee Mi-joo	
2023	MBC Gayo Daejejeon	with Lim Yoona and Hwang Min-hyun	
2024	MBC Gayo Daejejeon	with Lim Yoona and Dohoon	
2025	MBC Gayo Daejejeon	with Hwang Min-hyun and Annie	

=== Music video appearances ===
Year	Title	Artist	Ref.
2009	"Gee"	Girls' Generation	
2010	"Gee" (Japanese version)	Girls' Generation	
2010	"Sound"	VNT	
2016	"Miro"	Romeo	

== Theatre ==
Year	Title	Role	Ref.
2024	Waiting for Waiting for Godot	Val	
2025	Rendezvous	Tae-seop	
2025	Waiting for Waiting for Godot	Val	

== Awards and nominations ==
Name of the award ceremony, year presented, category, nominee of the award, and the result of the nomination
Award ceremony	Year	Category	Nominee / Work	Result	Ref.
Asia Artist Awards	2018	Asia Brilliant Award	Choi Min-ho	Won	
Baeksang Arts Awards	2014	Most Popular Actor (TV)	Medical Top Team	Nominated	
BIFF Marie Claire Asia Star Awards	2017	Face of Asia Award	Choi Min-ho	Won	
Golden Cinema Film Festival	2021	Jury's Special Prize	The Battle of Jangsari	Won	
Grand Bell Awards	2016	Best New Actor	Canola	Nominated	
Grand Bell Awards	2017	Best New Actor	Derailed	Nominated	
Indonesian Television Awards	2017	Special Award	Choi Min-ho	Won	
MBC Drama Awards	2013	Best New Actor	Medical Top Team	Nominated	
MBC Entertainment Awards	2014	Popularity Award (Music Talk Show)	Show! Music Core	Won	
MBC Entertainment Awards	2015	Popularity Award (Music Talk Show)	Show! Music Core	Won	
MBC Entertainment Awards	2025	Multi-player Award	I Live Alone	Won	
SBS Drama Awards	2012	New Star Award	To the Beautiful You	Won	
SBS Drama Awards	2012	Best Couple Award	Choi Min-ho (with Sulli); To the Beautiful You	Won	
SBS Entertainment Awards	2010	Best Newcomer in a Variety Show	Star King	Won	
