= Don't Call Me (album) =

- Digital and Fake Reality version cover

Studio album by Shinee
- Released: February 22, 2021
- Recorded: 2020–21
- Studios: SM Studios (Seoul, South Korea)
- Genres: K-pop; hip-hop; EDM; R&B; reggae
- Length: 30:01
- Languages: Korean; English
- Label: SM
- Producers: Dem Jointz; Yoo Young-jin; Kenzie; Ryan S. Jhun; Moonshine; Robbin; MinGtion; Cameron Louis Warren; Red Triangle; James Birt; Misunderstood; Sebastian Thott; Cage; Rasmus Palmgren; Steve Manovski; YK Koi

Shinee chronology
| The Story of Light (2018) | Don't Call Me (2021) | Superstar (2021) |

Singles from Don't Call Me
- 1. "Don't Call Me" Released: February 22, 2021

Alternative cover
- Digital and Adventure version cover artwork for Atlantis

Singles from Atlantis
- 1. "Atlantis" Released: April 12, 2021

Don't Call Me is the seventh Korean studio album by South Korean boy group Shinee. The album was released on February 22, 2021, through SM Entertainment. It is the group's first release since three of the members completed their military service with the exception of member Taemin and also the group's first album not to feature late member Jonghyun in any capacity. (Note: The special track "Lock You Down" on Shinee's sixth studio album featured Jonghyun's vocals.) Working with producers such as Dem Jointz, Yoo Young-jin, Kenzie, and Ryan S. Jhun, the album spans several genres such as pop, hip hop, EDM, R&B, and reggae. Shinee forwent an overarching theme for the album, instead opting for songs that marked the group's return after almost three years and presenting the record as a gift to fans. A repackage of the album, Atlantis, was released on April 12, 2021.

Don't Call Me peaked at number one on the Gaon Album Chart. The title track was released as the album's lead single. To promote the album, Shinee performed on music programs, and guested on various variety, reality, and radio programs.

== Background ==
On January 6, 2021, SM Entertainment announced Shinee would return with a new album after two and a half years as three of the members completed their military duties – members Onew, Key and Minho were discharged from the military in July, September and November, respectively. In an online conference the members said the transition from soldiers to K-pop singers was not the easiest. Onew stated, "While I was adjusting, I felt that my body was dancing separately under my neck," and added "it's the members who helped me out a lot. They kept me going and elaborately went into the details for the choreography." Fellow member Minho, who served in the Marine Corps, said it took him "about two months to completely adjust." Key talked about the pressure to match up to expectations with so much excitement for their new album but promised they would stay true to themselves and be diligent as they always have been. He also explained they chose "Don't Call Me" as the title track because they wanted a dramatic change from what they had been doing so far.

== Composition ==
Compared to previous releases, Don't Call Me features no overarching theme, and instead features songs that felt right for them, with Minho saying, "Some songs are quintessential Shinee songs, but there are also other songs that are things we've never tried before. They fit today's genres and musical mood." The album spans several genres, including pop, hip hop, EDM, R&B, and reggae, and was in the works for around one and a half years. SM Entertainment founder and executive producer Lee Soo-man worked closely with the group for the album's production and promotional appearances. Key viewed the album as a gift for fans for waiting for a long time for the group's return. Member Taemin felt the album's songs had a "connection" between Shinee's previous releases, sharing, "On this album there are a lot of different colours, which is what you expect from Shinee, but it's also a connected stream of content, with each member and style coming together at the end. You can see the connection between previous releases and now. And it will continue as our career does."

We felt that ("Don’t Call Me") was the perfect track because it also showcases our performance. That was something we really wanted to do. Shinee is a group that always tries something new.

— Minho about choosing 'Don't Call Me' as their title track in an interview with Dazed (February, 2021)

The title track, "Don't Call Me" is a hip hop-based dance song that combines a signature vocoder sound with an intense 808 bass, synth sound, and sampled vocal source. Written by Kenzie and produced by Kenzie, Dem Jointz, Yoo Young-jin, Robbin, and Ryan S. Jhun, the song is described as "a thrilling dance song [that] captures complex emotions after a love betrayal" and a "straightforward expression of the pain of being thoroughly betrayed by love." The members' vocals "expressing hysterical feelings...increase the immersion of the song." The group was looking for an impactful and strong song to emphasize their return from their hiatus. According to Taemin, there were a lot of potential title tracks including "Heart Attack" and "I Really Want You", but the group leaned towards "Don't Call Me" as a standout track. The group did not want to just showcase the group's usual style, but instead emphasize the performance aspect with the release. The song was cherished by Lee Soo-man, and was initially intended for BoA for her tenth studio album. Taemin noted that it was their most hip hop-inspired track, which was something the group had not attempted before. Rather than focusing too much on being experimental, the group wanted to emphasise the message that "Shinee's back."

"Heart Attack" is a dance pop song with an impactful bass loop and a funky electric guitar melody. It expresses the "feelings of overwhelming love for a lover who turns even pain into joy." "Marry You" is a mid-tempo R&B song about proposing a marriage to a long-time lover. It is the final part of a trilogy that began with "Replay" in 2008 and was continued with "Love Sick" in 2015. In addition, "Code", co-written by Kenzie and produced by Moonshine, is a futuristic dance song with a galloping bass; in the lyrics, the process of approaching a stranger with a dominating presence is likened to deciphering a code. The song is Taemin's favorite on the album. The album also contains the energetic pop song "I Really Want You" and "Kiss Kiss", which combines lyrics describing kisses between lovers with a kiss sound effect. In addition, the reggae genre dance song "Body Rhythm", co-written by Jam Factory's Shin Jin-hye and H1ghr Music's Woodie Gochild, expresses "dancing with sensous expressions." The R&B/pop song "Attention" depicts a romantic date in the middle of the night. The final song, "Kind", is an emotional pop ballad, which according to member Minho "represents the relationship between our members but it's also a song expressing our relationship with our fans; really any person we love or that we care about basically." Key felt the song could be open to different interpretations, saying, "It could be about our relationship with our fans, for loved ones, for anyone. But I think the most important thing about this track is that we wanted to express our thankfulness for those we care about."

== Release and promotion ==
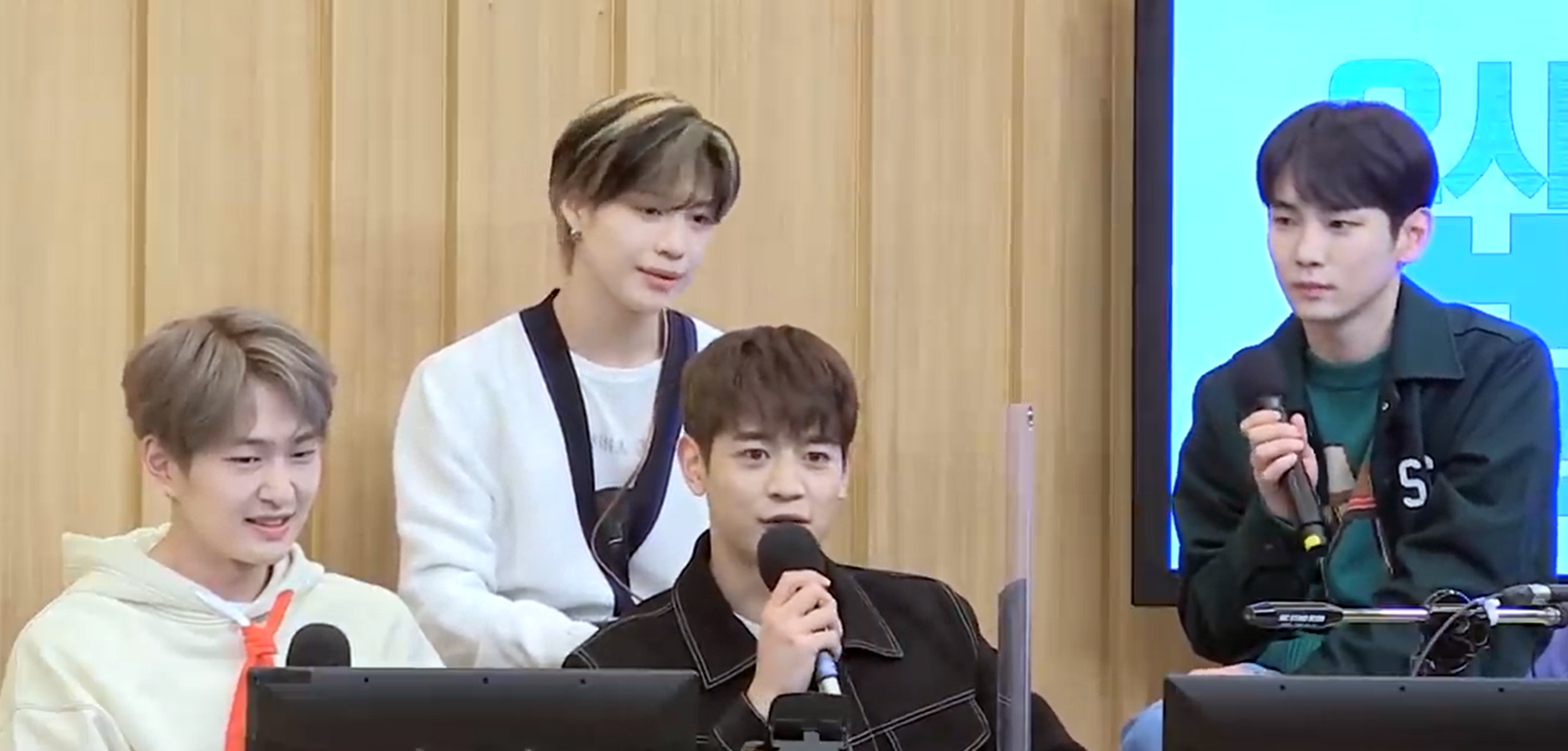
Shinee during the Cultwo Show on SBS Power FM, on February 23, 2021.

On January 31, 2021, Shinee held a special live stream, "The Ringtone: Shinee is Back", through their official YouTube and Naver V Live channels. During the special, the group announced they would make their return with their seventh studio album Don't Call Me on February 22 and performed the song "Marry You", one of the nine tracks on the upcoming album. Following the album's announcement, teaser images and a special "mood sampler" video titled "Fake Reality" were released. Later teaser videos featured "Reality" clips of each member. The album was sold through two photobook versions – "Fake Reality" and "Reality" versions, and four jewel case editions. For the album's cover and packaging, the group opted for "crisp, clean shots" as opposed to film camera shots and vintage clothing from previous albums, which juxtaposed with the "distorted" and "fake reality" the group finds themselves in. Alongside the release of teaser images for the album, a special phone number was set up for fans to hear voice messages from the group. The hotline was also used to share short snippets from the album's songs, as well as serve as an avenue for fans to leave voice messages. The hotline's servers went down temporarily due to the overwhelming number of calls that even the members could not contact the number when they tried calling the hotline.

Don't Call Me, featuring the album's title track as the lead single alongside its music video, was released on February 22, 2021. Prior to the video's release, the group held a V Live live stream, "Shinee's Calling: Answered." The album release was accompanied by an online showcase hosted by U-Know Yunho of TVXQ.

Shinee promoted Don't Call Me through various music programs, variety and reality shows, and radio programs. Onew and Key admitted that they faced difficulty learning the choreography of "Don't Call Me" due to its intensity. Taemin described it as a "world-shocking/surprising performance". Shinee began music show promotions at M Countdown, where they performed "Don't Call Me" and "Heart Attack". The group performed the two songs in succeeding music shows Music Bank, Show! Music Core, and Inkigayo. The group received music show wins for "Don't Call Me" on Show Champion, M Countdown, Show! Music Core, and Inkigayo during their first week of eligibility, as well as trophies on Show Champion and M Countdown the following week. Minho returned to Show! Music Core as a guest MC for the March 6 broadcast, where he filled in for Hyunjin of Stray Kids.

Prior to the album's release, the group appeared as guests on the February 20 episode of Knowing Bros, where they performed a sneak peek of "Don't Call Me" as well as a medley of their previous hits. On the same day, Shinee appeared on YouTube program Hello82, where they participated in a segment in guessing the meaning of Indonesian words. Minho guested on the February 18 episode of Jessi's Showterview where he simultaneously promoted Don't Call Me and his appearances in Law of the Jungle, as well as the February 23 episode of Problem Child in House. The group was featured in their own reality program, Shinee, Inc., which began airing on February 24 at TVN. Shinee partnered with soju brand Jinro to release special Shinee-themed soju bottles; a collaboration video was released on February 24 featuring the group and Jinro's frog mascots dancing to "Don't Call Me." Key and Minho guested on web variety show Painful Date on February 24, while Key was interviewed on YouTube program Milanonna. Onew and Minho appeared as guests on the February 27 episode of DoReMi Market, where Key serves as a regular cast member; the three promoted the comeback on the show. Shinee both performed "Don't Call Me" and participated in sketches on the February 28 broadcast of comedy show Comedy Big League. After the group's Inkigayo performance on February 28, a special interview, Shinee Exclusive!, was broadcast that featured Shinee being interviewed by Kiwi Media Group producer Kim Hyung Suk and DJ and SM labelmate Raiden. On the same day, Key and Minho appeared in the variety program Where Is My Home? where they helped search for possible home for a family. Onew and Taemin guested in the vlog of Korean-Indonesian YouTubers Kimbab Family where they visited SM Entertainment.

In March 2021, the group appeared in web show IU's Palette where host IU covered the group's previous hit "Sherlock (Clue + Note)", while Shinee covered IU's song "Dear Name". Shinee also taught IU the point choreography of "Don't Call Me". Shinee guested and performed "Don't Call Me" on Japanese variety program Sôkai jôhô variety Sukkiri!! on March 2, which served as their first Japanese television appearance since their hiatus. Shinee guested on the SBS Power FM show Cultwo Show on February 23, while Key and Taemin appeared on MBC FM4U Kim Shin-young's Noon Song of Hope on March 2, and Onew and Minho guested at KBS Cool FM show Kang Han-na's Volume Up on March 4. Shinee guested on YouTube channel ODG where they watched video highlights of their career with young children. The group appeared as panelists on the sixth episode of the eighth season of I Can See Your Voice on March 5. Key appeared on the variety show I Live Alone, where he showcased his home and spoke to close friend Taeyeon about promoting Don't Call Me and mentioning Jonghyun during one of his speeches.

Shinee held a Beyond Live online concert, Shinee World, on April 4 through V Live. It served as the group's first online concert, as well as their first concert since their Shinee World The Best 2018 tour in 2018. On March 24, a repackage of Don't Call Me was announced for an expected April release. The repackaged album titled Atlantis, containing three new tracks including "Area", "Days and Years", and the title track "Atlantis", was released digitally on April 12, and the physical album on April 15.

== Reception ==
=== Commercial performance ===
Upon its release, Don't Call Me debuted at number one on the Gaon Album Chart for the week ending February 27, 2021. The album debuted at number seven at the Billboard World Albums chart, becoming their first entry on the chart in three years, as well as their twelfth top ten entry. It was Shinee's best-selling album at the time.

=== Critical reception ===
Don't Call Me ratings
Review scores
| Source | Rating |
|---|---|
| Beats Per Minute | 76% |
| IZM | 3/5 stars |
| The Line of Best Fit | 8/10 stars |
| NME | 4/5 stars |

Atlantis ratings
Review scores
| Source | Rating |
|---|---|
| NME | 5/5 stars |

Kim Jak-ga of Kyunghyang Shinmun gave a positive review of Don't Call Me, saying that the group "never loses direction on how to express each song," with the album's songs being "smoothly connected and flows like a wave". Puah Ziwei of NME opined that the group "meander through echoes of their past hits, chase the latest trends and top things off with a lead single that, for better or worse, draws from the most polarising aspects of fellow SM acts", though she felt the "hits easily outnumber the misses and it still teeters the line of the Shinee sound," ultimately giving the album four stars out of five. Sophia Simon-Bashall of The Line of Best Fit felt the group "[claims] new ground" with Don't Call Me, noting the hip hop influence of the title track, which she stated "has become increasingly popular in K-pop during their two-year absence – but beneath that is something unique to Shinee". J.T. Early of Beats Per Minute saw the album as "both a consolidation of what has made them icons and an exciting glimpse into potential new directions", and viewed the record's diverse tracks as "a great album for both newer and older fans".

=== Year-end lists ===
Don't Call Me and Atlantis on year-end lists
| Critic/Publication | Work | List | Rank | Ref. |
|---|---|---|---|---|
| Harper's Bazaar | Don't Call Me | The Top 15 K-Pop Albums of 2021 | 12 | |
| Idology | Atlantis | Top 10 Albums of the Year | Placed | |
| Nylon | Atlantis | The Top K-Pop Albums of 2021 | Placed | |
| South China Morning Post | Atlantis | 25 best K-pop albums of 2021 | 8 | |
| Time | Atlantis | The Best K-Pop Songs and Albums of 2021 | Placed | |
| Dazed | "Atlantis" | The best K-pop tracks of 2021 | 4 | |
| Tone Deaf | "Atlantis" | The best K-pop songs of 2021 | Placed | |

== Track listing ==
Don't Call Me track listing
| No. | Title | Lyrics | Music | Arrangement | Length |
|---|---|---|---|---|---|
| 1. | "Don't Call Me" | Kenzie | Kenzie; Dwayne Abernathy Jr.; Rodnae "Chikk" Bell | Dem Jointz; Yoo Young-jin; Kenzie; Ryan S. Jhun; Robbin | 3:40 |
| 2. | "Heart Attack" | Kenzie | Andrew Choi; MinGtion; Dvwn | MinGtion | 2:59 |
| 3. | "Marry You" | Rick Bridges | Cameron Louis Warren | Cameron Louis Warren | 3:00 |
| 4. | "Code" | Kenzie | Kenzie; Jonatan Gusmark (Moonshine); Ludvig Evers (Moonshine); Adrian McKinnon | Moonshine | 3:14 |
| 5. | "I Really Want You" | Coogie; Jeong Ha-ri (153/Joombas); Lee Yi-jin (Lalala Studio) | Ed Drewett; Aston Merrygold; James Birt; George Tizzard; Rick Parkhouse; Ryan S. Jhun | Red Triangle; James Birt; Ryan S. Jhun; Robbin | 3:17 |
| 6. | "Kiss Kiss" | Danke (Lalala Studio) | Benjamin Roberts; Tido Nguyen; Stephan Benson (Misunderstood); Jeffrey Okyere-Twumasi (Misunderstood) | Misunderstood | 3:35 |
| 7. | "Body Rhythm" | Shin Jin-hye; Woodie Gochild | Sebastian Thott; Didrik Thott; Ylva Dimberg; Woodie Gochild | Sebastian Thott | 3:12 |
| 8. | "Attention" | Moon Seol-ri | Andy Love (153/Joombas); Karl-Oskar "Cage" Gummesson; Ninos Hanna; Rasmus Palmgren | Cage; Rasmus Palmgren | 3:44 |
| 9. | "Kind" (빈칸; Binkan; lit. 'Blank') | Bong Eun-young (Jam Factory) | Steve Manovski; YK Koi; Rhys Anderton; Simon John Bradshaw | Steve Manovski; YK Koi | 3:20 |
| Total length: | | | | | 30:01 |

Atlantis track listing
| No. | Title | Lyrics | Music | Arrangement | Length |
|---|---|---|---|---|---|
| 1. | "Atlantis" | Hwang Yu-bin; Changmo | Matt Thomson; Max Lynedoch Graham; Sir James F. Reynolds; Gabriel Brandes; Britt "PollyAnna" Pols; Engelina Andrina; Changmo; Yoo Young-jin | Arcades; Imlay; Yoo Young-jin | 2:58 |
| 2. | "Code" | Kenzie | Kenzie; Jonatan Gusmark (Moonshine); Ludvig Evers (Moonshine); Adrian McKinnon | Moonshine | 3:14 |
| 3. | "Don't Call Me" | Kenzie | Kenzie; Dwayne Abernathy Jr.; Rodnae "Chikk" Bell | Dem Jointz; Yoo Young-jin; Kenzie; Ryan S. Jhun; Robbin | 3:40 |
| 4. | "Area" (같은 자리; Gat-eun Jari) | Minho; JQ (MUMW); Cha Yu-bin (MUMW); Lee Yeon-ji (MUMW) | Peter Wallevik (PhD); Daniel Davidsen (PhD); Sam Merrifield; James "Yami" Bell | PhD | 3:27 |
| 5. | "Heart Attack" | Kenzie | Andrew Choi; MinGtion; Dvwn | MinGtion | 2:59 |
| 6. | "Marry You" | Rick Bridges | Cameron Louis Warren | Cameron Louis Warren | 3:00 |
| 7. | "Days and Years" | Seo Ji-eum; Colde | Tom Meredith; Nicole "Coco" Morier; Benjamin Ingrosso; Colde | Tom Meredith | 3:56 |
| 8. | "I Really Want You" | Coogie; Jeong Ha-ri (153/Joombas); Lee Yi-jin (Lalala Studio) | Ed Drewett; Aston Merrygold; James Birt; George Tizzard; Rick Parkhouse; Ryan S. Jhun | Red Triangle; James Birt; Ryan S. Jhun; Robbin | 3:17 |
| 9. | "Kiss Kiss" | Danke (Lalala Studio) | Benjamin Roberts; Tido Nguyen; Stephan Benson (Misunderstood); Jeffrey Okyere-Twumasi (Misunderstood) | Misunderstood | 3:35 |
| 10. | "Attention" | Moon Seol-ri | Andy Love (153/Joombas); Karl-Oskar "Cage" Gummesson; Ninos Hanna; Rasmus Palmgren | Cage; Rasmus Palmgren | 3:44 |
| 11. | "Body Rhythm" | Shin Jin-hye; Woodie Gochild | Sebastian Thott; Didrik Thott; Ylva Dimberg; Woodie Gochild | Sebastian Thott | 3:12 |
| 12. | "Kind" (빈칸; Binkan; lit. 'Blank') | Bong Eun-young | Steve Manovski; YK Koi; Rhys Anderton; Simon John Bradshaw | Steve Manovski; YK Koi | 3:20 |
| Total length: | | | | | 40:27 |

Notes

- "Code" is stylized as "CØDE".

== Personnel ==
Personnel adapted from the liner notes for Atlantis.

- Byeon Jang-mun – background vocals (track 9)
- Changmo – vocal directing (track 1)
- Andrew Choi – background vocals (track 5)
- Dala – background vocals (track 6)
- Deez – vocal directing (tracks 6, 8)
- Dvwn – background vocals (track 5)
- Woodie Gochild – vocal directing (track 11)
- Heo Seong-ju – background vocals (track 6)
- Jang Woo-young (Doobdoob Studio) – digital editing (tracks 6–7)
- Jeong Eui-seok (SM Blue Cup Studio) – mixing (tracks 3, 9), recording (tracks 3, 6, 9)
- Jeong Yu-ra – digital editing (tracks 2, 4–5, 7, 9–10)
- Nam Gung-jin (SM Concert Hall Studio) – mixing (tracks 1–2, 6)
- Ju Chan-yang (Iconic Sounds) – vocal directing (track 10)
- Junny – background vocals (track 11)
- Kang Eun-ji (SM SSAM Studio) – digital editing (track 12), mix engineering (tracks 4, 6, 8), recording (tracks 4, 11)
- Kenzie – directing (tracks 2–3), vocal directing (track 1)
- Kim Cheol-sun (SM Blue Ocean Studio) – mixing (tracks 4, 12)
- Kim Han-gu (Sound Pool Studios) – mixing (track 8)
- Kim Ye-ji (Doobdoob Studio) – assistant recording (track 8)
- Kim Yeon-seo – vocal directing (tracks 7, 9)
- Kwon Nam-woo (821 Sound Mastering) – mastering
- Kwon Yu-jin (Doobdoob Studio) – digital editing (track 8), recording (track 8)
- Lee Ji-hong (SM LVYIN Studio) – digital editing (track 11), mixing (tracks 7, 11), mix engineering (tracks 2, 9, 11–12), recording (tracks 7, 9)
- Lee Min-gyu (SM Big Shot Studio) – digital editing (track 3), mixing (tracks 5, 10), mix engineering (tracks 3, 5, 7, 10), recording (tracks 2–3, 10, 12)
- Adrian McKinnon – background vocals (track 2)
- minGtion – bass (track 5), directing (track 5), piano (track 5)
- Misunderstood – background vocals (track 9)
- Noday – vocal directing (tracks 4, 11–12)
- No Min-ji (SM Yellow Tail Studio) – digital editing (track 1), mix engineering (track 1), recording (tracks 1, 5–6, 9, 11–12)
- Shinee – vocals, background vocals
- Amber-Kuti-Smith – background vocals (track 6)
- Lynsey Dawn Ward – background vocals (track 6)
- Cameron Louis Warren – background vocals (track 6)
- Yoo Young-jin – background vocals (track 3)

== Charts ==
=== Weekly charts ===
Weekly chart performance
| Chart (2021) | Peak position | |
| Chart (2021) | Don't Call Me | Atlantis |
|---|---|---|
| Japanese Albums (Oricon) | 7 | – |
| Japan Hot Albums (Billboard Japan) | 8 | 7 |
| South Korean Albums (Gaon) | 1 | 2 |
| UK Album Downloads (Official Charts) | 24 | – |
| UK Independent Albums (Official Charts) | 38 | – |
| US Heatseekers Albums (Billboard) | 14 | – |
| US World Albums (Billboard) | 7 | – |

=== Monthly charts ===
Monthly chart performance
| Chart (2021) | Peak position | |
| Chart (2021) | Don't Call Me | Atlantis |
|---|---|---|
| Japanese Albums (Oricon) | 17 | – |
| South Korean Albums (Gaon) | 2 | 8 |

=== Year-end charts ===
Year-end chart performance
| Chart (2021) | Position | |
| Chart (2021) | Don't Call Me | Atlantis |
|---|---|---|
| Japanese Albums (Oricon) | 93 | — |
| South Korean Albums (Gaon) | 46 | 72 |

== Certifications and sales ==
Certifications and sales for Don't Call Me and Atlantis
| Region | Certification | Certified units/sales |
|---|---|---|
| South Korea (KMCA) Don't Call Me | Platinum | 307,859 |
| South Korea Atlantis | — | 147,023 |

== Accolades ==
Awards and nominations for Don't Call Me and Atlantis
| Ceremony | Year | Award | Work | Result | Ref. |
|---|---|---|---|---|---|
| Gaon Chart Music Awards | 2022 | Album of the Year — 1st Quarter | Don't Call Me | Nominated | |
| Golden Disc Awards | 2022 | Album Bonsang | Don't Call Me | Nominated | |
| Korean Music Awards | 2022 | Best K-Pop Album | Atlantis | Nominated | |
| Melon Music Awards | 2021 | Album of the Year (Daesang) | Don't Call Me | Nominated | |

== Release history ==
Release history and formats for Don't Call Me and Atlantis
| Edition | Region | Date | Format | Label |
|---|---|---|---|---|
| Don't Call Me | South Korea | February 22, 2021 | CD; digital download; streaming | SM Entertainment; Dreamus |
| Don't Call Me | Various | February 22, 2021 | Digital download; streaming | SM Entertainment |
| Atlantis | Various | April 12, 2021 | Digital download; streaming | SM Entertainment |
| Atlantis | South Korea | April 15, 2021 | CD | SM Entertainment; Dreamus |
