= List of songs recorded by Girls' Generation =

Here is a complete list of songs by the South Korean girl group Girls' Generation.

== 0–9 ==
Song	Writer	Album	Year
"7989"	Kangta	Girls' Generation	2007

== A ==
Song	Writer	Album	Year
"All My Love Is for You"	Junji Ishiwatari, Sebastian Thott, Didrik Thott, Robin Lerner	Girls & Peace	2012
"Animal"	Hank Solo, Tom Aeio, Erik Nyholm, Eric Palmqwist	Girls & Peace	2012
"Adrenaline"	Kim Minjung, Mafly, Ina Wroldsen, Lucas Secon, Mich Hansen, Jonas Jeberg, Yoo Jeni	Holler	2014
"All Night"	Kenzie, Ollipop, Daniel Caesar, Ludwig Lindell, Hayley Aitken, Caesar & Loui	Holiday Night	2017

== B ==
Song	Writer	Album	Year
"Beginning"	Yoon Hyo Sang, Anna-Lena Margaretha Hogdahl, Mattias Lindblom, Anders Wollbeck	Into the New World	2007
"Baby Baby"	Hwang Seong Je (BJJ), Yoo Jenny	Girls' Generation	2007
"Boyfriend"	Joleen Belle, Kim Ji Hoo, Carsten Lindberg, Joachim Svare	Tell Me Your Wish (Genie)	2009
"Be Happy"	E-Tribe, J-STA, Gong Hyunsik	Oh!	2010
"Boys & Girls"	Hwang Chanhee, Jo Eunhee, Park Junho	Oh!	2010
"Bad Girl"	Hiro, Jörgen Elofsson, Jesper Jakobson, Lauren Dyson	Girls' Generation	2011
"Beautiful Stranger"	Hiro, Leah Haywood, Daniel James, Carl Sturken, Evan Rogers	Girls' Generation	2011
"Born to Be a Lady"	Kanata Nakamura, Leah Haywood, Daniel James, Shelly Peiken	Girls' Generation	2011
"Baby Steps"	Jimmy Andrew Richard, Sean Alexander, Tom Roger, Jimmy Burney, Joachim Alte	Twinkle	2012
"Beep Beep"	Jeff Miyahara, Anne Judith Wik, Ronny Svendsen, Nermin Harambasic & Robin Jenssen	Flower Power	2012
"Boomerang"	Charlie Mason, Oscar Gorres, Danny Saucedo, OZGO	Girls & Peace	2012
"Baby Maybe"	Sooyoung, Kwon Yuri, Seohyun, Mich Hansen, Jonas Jeberg, Ruth-Anne Cunningham, Pixie Lott	I Got a Boy	2013
"Blue Jeans"	Obie Mhondera, Tim Hawes, Katerina Bramley, Tom Diekmeier	Love & Peace	2013
"Back Hug"	Cho Yun Kyoung, Ingrid Skretting, Jesper Borgen	Mr.Mr.	2014
"Bump It"	Cho Yoon-kyung, Anne Judith Wik, Ronny Svendsen, Uwe Fahrenkrog-Petersen, Greg Fizgerald	Lion Heart	2015

== C ==
Song	Writer	Album	Year
"Complete"	Jo Yoon Gyung, Jan Lysdahl, Ingrid Skretting	Girls' Generation	2007
"Chocolate Love"	Bloodshy & Avant, Kenzie	None	2009
"Checkmate"	Kim Boo Min, Hitchhiker	Twinkle	2012
"Chain Reaction"	Kesha, E. Kidd Bogart, busbee, Michael Brooks Linney	The Best	2014
"Cheap Creaper"	N/A	Make Your Move (OST)	2014
"Catch Me If You Can"	Mafly, Choe A-Leum, Erik Lidbom, Jin Choi	Catch Me If You Can	2015
"Check"	Teddy Riley, Lee Hyun-seung, Dominique Rodriguez	Lion Heart	2015
"Closer"	Moon Hye-min, Peter Wallevik, Daniel Davidsen, Katy Tizzard, Joe Killington	Forever 1	2022

== D ==
Song	Writer	Album	Year
"Dear Mom"	The Lighthouse, No Tae Ryung, Kim Tae Sung	Gee	2009
"Destiny"	James Read, Choi Gap Won, Ahn Ik Su	Gee	2009
"Day By Day"	Yoo Young-suk, MIHO	Oh!	2010
"Diamond"	Kim Jung-bae, Kenzie	SMTown – The Warmest Gift	2011
"Dancing Queen"	Yoon Hyo-sang, Jessica Jung, Duffy, Tiffany Hwang, Steve Booker, Kenzie	I Got a Boy	2012
"Do The Catwalk"	Junji Ishiwatari, Okajima, Kanata, Andreas Öberg, Maria Marcus	Love & Peace	2013
"Divine"	Kamikaoru, Stephan Elmgren, Albi Albertsson, Sean Alexander	The Best	2014

== E ==
Song	Writer	Album	Year
"Etude"	Hwang Sung Je, Yoo Jeni	Tell Me Your Wish (Genie)	2009
"Echo"	Remee	Run Devil Run	2010
"Express 999"	Kim Jung Bae, Kenzie	I Got a Boy	2013
"Everyday Love"	Obi Mhondera, Tim Hawes, Katerina Bramley, Tom Diekmeier	Love & Peace	2013
"Europa"	Kenzie	Mr.Mr.	2014
"Eyes"	Mafly, Albi Albertsson, Mara Kim, MUSSASHI	Holler	2014

== F ==
Song	Writer	Album	Year
"Fun & Fun"	Song Jaewon, Double J Show	Oh!	2010
"Forever"	Kim Jinhwan	Oh!	2010
"Flower Power"	Johan Gustafson, Fredrik Häggstam, Sebastian Lundberg	Girls & Peace	2012
"Flyers"	Steven Lee, Sebastian Thott, Didrik Thott	Love & Peace	2013
"Fire Alarm"	Kenzie, Trinity Music	Lion Heart	2015
"Fan"	Kenzie	Holiday Night	2017
"Forever 1"	Kenzie, Ylva Dimberg	Forever 1	2022
"Freedom"	Jeong Ha-ri, Gabriella Bishop, Camden Cox, Cameron Warren	Forever 1	2022

== G ==
Song	Writer	Album	Year
"Girls' Generation"	Lee Seung-chul, Song Jae Jun	Girls' Generation	2007
"Gee"	Ahn Myung-won, Kim Young-deuk, E-Tribe	Gee	2009
"Girlfriend"	Kenzie, Kim Jung Bae	Tell Me Your Wish (Genie)	2009
"Goodbye, Hello"	Kim Boo-min, Hitchhiker	Twinkle	2012
"Girls & Peace"	Anne Judith Wik, Ronny Svendsen, Nermin Harambasic, Robin Jenssen	Girls & Peace	2012
"Galaxy Supernova"	Kamikaoru, Junji Ishiwatari, Fridolin Nordsø, Frederik Tao, Martin Hedegaard	Love & Peace	2013
"Gossip Girls"	Kanata Okajima, Andreas Öberg, Maria Marcus	Love & Peace	2013
"Goodbye"	Lindy Robbins, Brent Paschke, Jenna Andrews, Hwang Hyun	Mr.Mr.	2014
"Girls"	Lee Seu-Lan, Roel De Meulemeester, Guy Balbaert, Stefanie De Meulemeester	Catch Me If You Can	2015
"Green Light"	Mafly, The Underdogs, Mike Daley, Andrew Hey, Britany Burton, Rodnae 'Chikk' Bell	Lion Heart	2015
"Girls Are Back"	Jo Yoon-kyung, Im Jung-hyo, Deez, Anne Judith Stokke Wik, Che Jamal Pope	Holiday Night	2017

== H ==
Song	Writer	Album	Year
"Honey"	Kwon Yun Jeong, Ingrid Skretting	Girls' Generation	2007
"Haechi"		My Friend, Haechi OST	2010
"Hoot"	John Hyunkyu Lee, Alex James, Lars Halvor Jensen, Martin Michael Larsson	Hoot (009)	2010
"How Great Is Your Love"	Sooyoung, Jean Na	The Boys	2011
"Holler"	Mafly, Figge Boström, Anna Nordell, Maria Marcus	Holler	2014
"Holiday"	Seohyun, JQ, Kim Hye-jung, Lawrence Lee, Marta Grauers, Louise Frick Sveen	Holiday Night	2017

== I ==
Song	Writer	Album	Year
"Into the New World"	Kenzie, Kim Jeong Bae, Lee Soo-man	Girls' Generation	2007
"I'm In Love with the Hero"	Kanata Nakamura, Leah Haywood, Daniel James, Kevin Christopher Ross, Bret Carlson Puchir	Girls' Generation	2011
"I'm A Diamond"	Dapo Torimiro, Priscilla Hamilton, H.U.B.	Girls & Peace	2012
"I Got A Boy"	Yoo Young-jin, Will Simms, Anne Judith Wik, Sarah Lundbäck	I Got a Boy	2013
"Indestructible"	Kamikaoru, Claire Rodrigues, Albi Albertsson, Chris Meyer	The Best	2014
"It's You"	Yuri, Kevin Charge, Claire Rodrigues Lee	Holiday Night	2017

== K ==
Song	Writer	Album	Year
"Kissing You"	Lee Jae Myung	Girls' Generation	2007
"Karma Butterfly"	Grace Tither, Christian Vinten	Love & Peace	2013

== L ==
Song	Writer	Album	Year
"Love Melody"		Winter SMTown – Only Love	2007
"Let's Talk About Love"	Young H. Kim	Gee	2009
"Little Boat"		Hong Gil Dong OST	2009
"Let It Rain"	Hiro, Love, Habolin	Girls' Generation	2011
"Lazy Girl"	Kim Tae-yoon, Lucas Secon, Thomas Troelsen	The Boys	2011
"Library"	Jo Yoon Kyung, Sharon Vaughn, Didrik Thott, Sebastian Thott, Hitchhiker	Twinkle	2012
"Love Sick"	Kang Ah Deun, Hwang Chan Hee, PJ	Twinkle	2012
"Look At Me"	Jeon Candy, Johan Gustafson, Fredrik Häggstam, Sebastian Lundberg, Louis Schoorl	I Got a Boy	2013
"Lost In Love"	Park Chang Hyun	I Got a Boy	2013
"Love & Girls"	Kamikaoru, Erik Lidbom, Ronny Svendsen, Anne Judith Wik	Love & Peace	2013
"Lingua franca"	Hidenori Tanaka, Agehasprings, Andreas Öberg, Jon Hallgren, Ylva Dimberg	Love & Peace	2013
"Lips"	Daniel "Obi" Klein, Charlie Taft	Love & Peace	2013
"Lion Heart"	Jam Factory, Joy Factory, Sean Alexander, Darren 'Baby Dee Beats' Smith, Claudia Brant	Lion Heart	2015
"Love is Bitter"	Hwang Hyun, Mayu Wakisaka	Holiday Night	2017
"Light Up The Sky"	Kenzie, Erik Lidbom	Holiday Night	2017
"Lucky Like That"	Hwang Yu-bin, Sebastian Thott, Linnea Deb, David Strääf	Forever 1	2022

== M ==
Song	Writer	Album	Year
"Merry Go Round"	Kim Jeong Bae, Kenzie	Girls' Generation	2007
"My Child"	Hwang Sung Je (BJJMusic), Yoo Jeni	Tell Me Your Wish (Genie)	2009
"Motion"		Heading to the Ground OST	2009
"Mistake"	Kwon Yuri, Cheryl Yie, Jean Na	Hoot (009)	2010
"My Best Friend"	Wheesung, Carsten Lindberg, Joachim Svares, Joleen Bell, Jade Anderson, Michael Jay	Hoot (009)	2010
"Mr. Taxi"	STY, Scott Mann, Chad Royce, Paolo Prudencio, Allison Veltz	Girls' Generation	2011
"My J"	Hwang Sungje	The Boys	2011
"My Oh My"	Erik Lewander, Ylva Dimberg, Louis Schoorl	Love & Peace	2013
"Motorcycle"	Maria Marcus, Andreas Öberg	Love & Peace	2013
"Mr.Mr."	The Underdogs	Mr.Mr.	2014
"Mood Lamp"	Jo Yoon-kyung, Jamie Jones, Jack Kugell, Lamont Neuble, Tim Stewart, Treasure Davis	Forever 1	2022

== N ==
Song	Writer	Album	Year
"Not Alone"	Erik Nyholm, Patrick Hamilton	Girls & Peace	2012

== O ==
Song	Writer	Album	Year
"Ooh La-La!"	Yoon Hyo Sang, Steve Lee	Girls' Generation	2007
"One Year Later"	Kim Jin Hwan	Tell Me Your Wish (Genie)	2009
"Oh!"	Kenzie, Nozomi Maezawa, Kim Jungbae, Kim Younghu	Oh!	2010
"Oscar"	Kim Jungbae, Kenzie	The Boys	2011
"OMG (Oh My God)"	Kim Jung Bae, Kenzie	Twinkle	2012
"Only U"	Seohyun, Lauren Dyson, Sebastian Thott, Erik Lidbom	Holler	2014
"One Afternoon"	Hwang Hyun (MonoTree), Shin Agnes	Lion Heart	2015
"Only One"	January 8, Andreas Öberg, Maria Marcus, Gustav Karlstrom	Holiday Night	2017
"One Last Time"	Mafly, Lee Hee-ju, Michael Woods, Kevin White, Andrew Bazzi, MZMC, Rice n' Peas	Holiday Night	2017

== P ==
Song	Writer	Album	Year
"Paparazzi"	Fredrik Thomander, Johan Becker, Junji Ishiwatari	Girls & Peace	2012
"Promise"	Moul, Joseph Belmaati	I Got a Boy	2013
"Party"	Jo Yun-gyeong, Albi Albertsson, Chris Young, Shin Agnes	Lion Heart	2015
"Paradise"	U.F.O (Jam Factory), Mafly, Nermin Harambašić, Courtney Woolsey, Charite Vike, Erik Fjeld, Saima Mian	Lion Heart	2015
"Paper Plane"	Charlie, Moa "Cazzi Opeia" Carlebecker, Emily Kim, Fredrik "Figge" Hakan Boström	Forever 1	2022

== R ==
Song	Writer	Album	Year
"Run Devil Run"	Busbee, Alex James, Kalle Engstrom	Run Devil Run	2010
"Reflection"	Lars Halvor Jensen, Martin Michael Larsson, Zac Poor	Girls & Peace	2012
"Romantic St."	Lee Shin-sung, Lee Chan-mi, Sumi, Matthew Heath, Hailey Collier, DK, Jordan Kyle, Hyuk Shin, Jee Yoon Yoo	I Got a Boy	2013

== S ==
Song	Writer	Album	Year
"Star Star Star"	E-Tribe, Go Myungjae	Oh!	2010
"Show! Show! Show!"	Kim Boo-min, Hitchhiker	Oh!	2010
"Stick With U"	Lee Jae-Myoung	Oh!	2010
"Snowy Wish"	Hwang Hyun	Hoot (009)	2010
"Say Yes"	Kim Younghoo	The Boys	2011
"SunFlower"	Kim Boo-min, Hitchhiker	The Boys	2011
"Stay Girls"	Sebastian Thott, Andreas Öberg, Melanie Fontana, Kenn Kato	Girls & Peace	2012
"Soul"	Anne Judith Wik, Nermin Harambasic, Ronny Svendsen, Dominique Rodriguez, Hyun-Seung Lee, Lukas Nathanson, Cho Yun-kyoung	Mr.Mr.	2014
"Stay"	Brian Kim, Caesar & Loui, Olof Lindskog, Hayley Aitken	Holler	2014
"Show Girls"	Mafly, Ricky Hanley, Paul Drew, Greig Watts, Pete Barringer, Joe Killington, Katerina Bramley	The Best	2014
"Sign"	Kim Bu-min, Hitchhiker	Lion Heart	2015
"Sweet Talk"	Seohyun, Wassily Gradovsky, Carolyn Jordan, Alice Penrose, Mussashi	Holiday Night	2017
"Seventeen"	Lee On-eul, Sooyoung, Tiffany, Daniel "Obi" Klein, Charli Taft, Andreas Öberg, Emily Kim	Forever 1	2022
"Summer Night"	Yun, Royal Dive, Sofia Kay	Forever 1	2022

== T ==
Song	Writer	Album	Year
"Tears"	Kim Seok Hyeon, Park Gi Wan	Girls' Generation	2007
"Tinkerbell"	Jo Yoon Gyeong, Ingrid Skretting	Girls' Generation	2007
"Tell Me Your Wish (Genie)"	Anne Judith Wik, Robin Jensen, Ronny Svendsen, Nermin Harambasic, Fridolin Nordsø, Yoo Young-jin	Tell Me Your Wish (Genie)	2009
"Touch The Sky"		30,000 Miles in Search of My Son OST	2007
"Talk to Me"	Kim Heewon, Machan Taylor, Jo Yonghun	Oh!	2010
"The Great Escape"	STY, Andre Merritt, E. Kidd Bogart, Greg Ogan, Spencer Nezey	Girls' Generation	2011
"The Boys"	Yoo Young-jin, Teddy Riley, Taesung Kim, DOM, Richard Garcia, Tiffany	The Boys	2011
"Telepathy"	Kim Boo-min, Hitchhiker	The Boys	2011
"Trick"	Jo Yoonkyung, Martin Hansen	The Boys	2011
"Top Secret"	Hong Jiyu, Peter Wennerberg, Mathias Venge, Gabriella Jangfeldt, Sharon Vaughn	The Boys	2011
"Time Machine"	Andy Love	Re:package Album "Girls' Generation" ~The Boys~	2011
"Twinkle"	So Ji Eum, B. Fraley, J. Fraley, J. Solis	Twinkle	2012
"T.O.P"	Heidi Rojas, Allan Eshuijs, Kalle Engstrom	Girls & Peace	2012
"Talk Talk"	Kim Tae Sung, Mason Charlie, Oscar Gorres, Danny Saucedo	I Got a Boy	2013
"Talk Talk"	Cho Yoon-kyung, Mental Audio, Ylva Dimberg	Lion Heart	2015

== V ==
Song	Writer	Album	Year
"Vitamin"	Hwang Hyun	The Boys	2011
"Villain"	Sooyoung, Tiffany, Josh Cumbee	Forever 1	2022

== W ==
Song	Writer	Album	Year
"Way to Go! (Himnae)"	Kim Jung Bae, Kenzie	Gee	2009
"Wake Up"	Kim Boo-min, Hitchhiker	Hoot (009)	2010
"Wait A Minute"	Lee Joo Hyung, G-High, Shin Agnes, Hwang Hyun, Mowl	Mr.Mr.	2014
"Whisper"	Mafly, Im Gwang Uk, Martin Hoberg Hedegaard, Andrew Jackson	Holler	2014

== X ==
Song	Writer	Album	Year
"XYZ"	Seohyun, Kwon Yuri, The Stereotypes, Victoria Horn	I Got a Boy	2013

== Y ==
Song	Writer	Album	Year
"You Aholic"	STY, Lindy Roberts, E. Kidd Bogart, Greg Ogan, Spencer Nezey	Girls' Generation	2011
"You Think"	Brandon Sammons (Massive Muzik), Sara Forsberg, Dante Jones	Lion Heart	2015
"You Better Run"	Moon Hye-min, Grace Tither, Kyle MacKenzie, Keir MacCulloch, Katya Edwards	Forever 1	2022

== Other songs ==
Song	Album	Year
"Haptic Motion"	None	2008
"Oppa Nappa"	None	2008
"It's Fantastic"	None	2008
"I Can't Bear It Anymore (Bear Song)"	None	2008
"Holding Your Hand" (with Super Junior, SS501, Jewelry, and more)	None	2008
"SEOUL" (with Super Junior)	None	2009
"HaHaHa"	None	2009
"Cabi Song" (with 2PM)	None	2010
"LaLaLa"	None	2010
"Hey Cooky!"	None	2010
"Visual Dreams"	None	2011
"Sailing (0805)"	None	2016

== See also ==
- Girls' Generation discography
