= Girls' Generation discography =

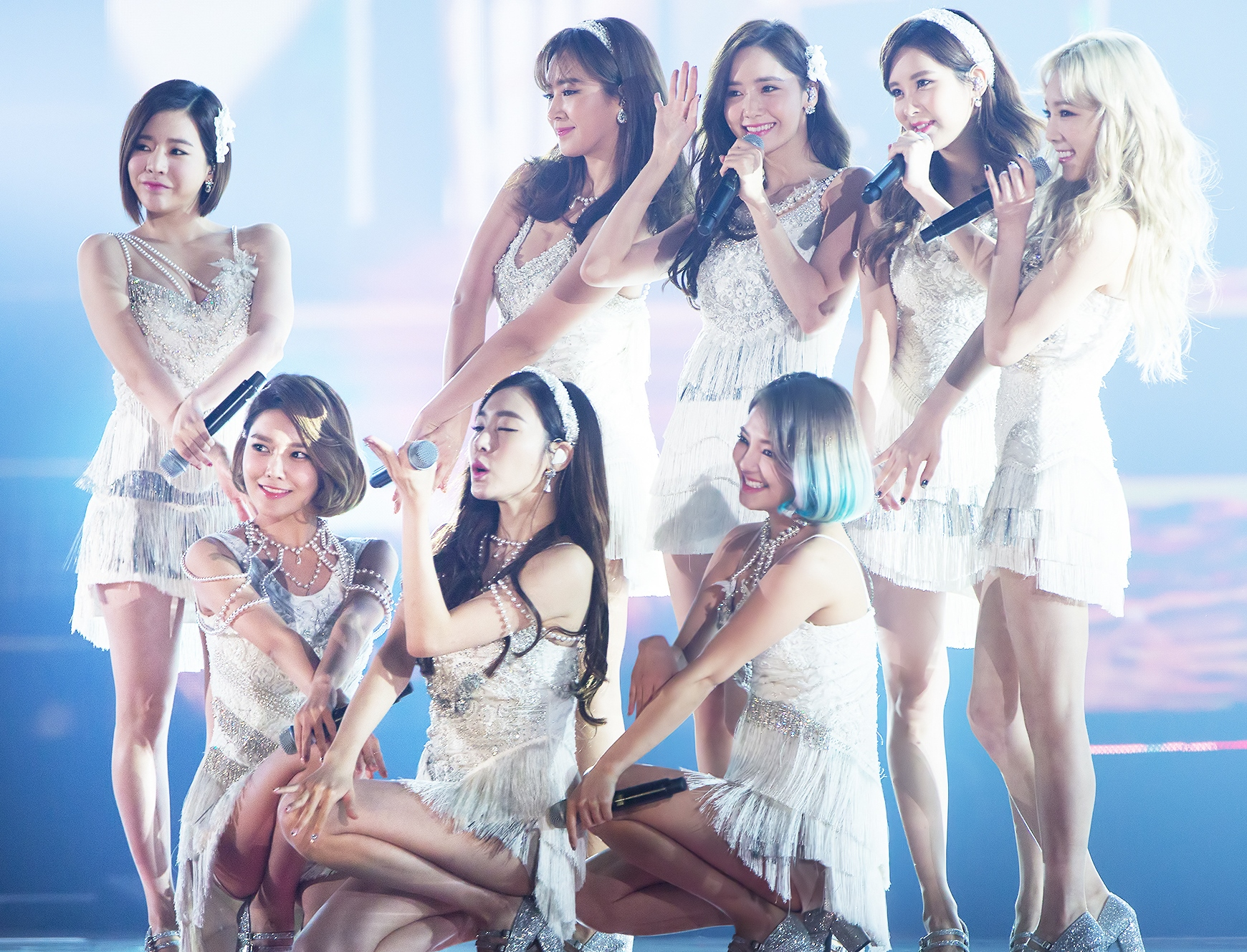
- Girls' Generation performing in 2015
- Studio albums: 10
- Extended plays: 4
- Live albums: 2
- Compilation albums: 2
- Singles: 35
- Video albums: 12
- Music videos: 44

South Korea-based girl group Girls' Generation have released ten studio albums (three of which were reissued under different titles), two live albums, four extended plays (EPs), and 35 singles. As of November 2012, Girls' Generation has sold over 4.4 million albums and 30 million digital singles. The group has sold over 1.74 million albums in South Korea as of December 2014, and 3.48 million records, including over 945,000 physical singles and 1.9 million albums in Japan as of January 2017.

Girls' Generation debuted in 2007 with the single "Into the New World" and their self-titled studio album, which was later re-released as Baby Baby in 2008. The album spawned three more singles: "Girls' Generation", "Kissing You", and "Baby Baby". In 2009, Girls' Generation released two EPs: Gee and Genie. The single "Gee" was the best-selling single of 2009 in South Korea. In 2010, the group released their second studio album Oh!, its reissue Run Devil Run, and their third EP, Hoot. All three records reached number one in South Korea and were among the highest-selling albums of the year. The singles "Oh!", "Run Devil Run" and "Hoot" all peaked atop South Korea's singles chart.

Girls' Generation debuted in Japan with the re-recorded versions of their singles "Genie" and "Gee". The latter reached number one on the Oricon Daily Singles Chart, making Girls' Generation the first non-Japanese Asian girl group to do so. Their first Japanese-language album, Girls' Generation (2011), was certified million by the Recording Industry Association of Japan (RIAJ) and became the highest-selling album by a Korean girl group in Japan. Their first original Japanese song, "Mr. Taxi", reached number one on the Japan Hot 100. Girls' Generation's third Korean and fourth studio album, The Boys (2011), was the best-selling album of the year in South Korea. The title track reached number one in South Korea.

The group's second Japanese studio album and fifth overall, Girls & Peace (2012), spawned the singles "Oh!", "Paparazzi" and "Flower Power". Girls' Generation's fourth Korean studio album, I Got a Boy (2013), reached number one in South Korea. Its singles "Dancing Queen", a remake of English singer Duffy's "Mercy", and title track "I Got a Boy" both charted atop South Korean singles chart. The group's third Japanese studio album and seventh overall, Love & Peace (2013), reached number one in Japan and spawned the singles "Love & Girls" and "Galaxy Supernova". Their fourth EP, Mr.Mr., and its titular single were released in 2014; both reached number one on South Korea's albums and singles charts.

The greatest hits album The Best (2014) made Girls' Generation the first Korean girl group to have three number-one albums in Japan. Girls' Generation's single "Catch Me If You Can" (2015) was their first release since member Jessica left the group in September 2014. The group's fifth Korean studio album Lion Heart, released in 2015, peaked atop the South Korean albums chart and produced three singles: "Party", "Lion Heart" and "You Think". Their sixth Korean studio album Holiday Night was released in 2017 to commemorate their tenth anniversary. It peaked at number two in South Korea and yielded two singles: "All Night" and "Holiday". Their seventh Korean studio album Forever 1 was released in 2022, five years after the release of Holiday Night, to commemorate their fifteenth anniversary. It peaked at number two in South Korea and produced a top-five single "Forever 1", Girls' Generation's first top-five single in six years.

== Albums ==
=== Korean studio albums ===
List of Girls' Generation Korean studio albums
Title	Details	Peak chart positions										Sales	Certifications
Title	Details	KOR	AUS Dig.	FRA	JPN	NZ Heat.	SPA	UK Dig.	US Curr. Sales	US Heat.	US World	Sales	Certifications
Girls' Generation	Released: November 1, 2007; Label: SM Entertainment; Formats: Cassette, CD, digital download	16 (Note: Prior to the Circle Music Chart, which launched in 2010, the Music Industry Association of Korea (MIAK) compiled sales figures for music releases until 2008. The album Girls' Generation, which was released in 2007, peaked at number one on the monthly MIAK chart for March 2008. It peaked at number 16 on the Circle Weekly Album Chart.)	—	—	—	—	—	—	—	—	—	KOR: 174,545	
Oh!	Released: January 28, 2010; Label: SM Entertainment; Formats: CD, digital download	1	—	—	54	—	—	—	—	—	—	KOR: 247,520 (Note: Sales in 2010 – 197,934 and sales from January 2011 to July 2022 – 49,586); JPN: 9,318; TW: 37,000	
The Boys	Released: October 19, 2011; Label: SM, Interscope, Polydor, Universal; Formats: CD, digital download	1	—	130	2 (Note: The international version of The Boys featuring the English-language version of the single "The Boys" peaked at number 26 on the Oricon chart on April 9, 2012.)	—	64	—	—	17	2	KOR: 471,620; JPN: 107,800; US: 1,000	
I Got a Boy	Released: January 1, 2013; Label: SM Entertainment; Formats: CD, digital download	1	—	—	7	—	—	—	—	2	1	KOR: 318,886; JPN: 54,000; US: 3,000	
Lion Heart	Released: August 19, 2015 (Note: Lion Heart was released digitally worldwide on August 19, 2015. Another version titled You Think was released physically on August 21.); Label: SM Entertainment; Formats: CD, digital download	1	—	—	11	—	—	—	—	7	1	KOR: 165,361; JPN: 21,500; US: 1,000	
Holiday Night	Released: August 7, 2017; Label: SM Entertainment; Formats: CD, digital download	2	—	—	16	6	—	—	—	5	1	KOR: 178,407; JPN: 11,000; US: 2,000	
Forever 1	Released: August 5, 2022; Label: SM Entertainment; Formats: CD, digital download, streaming	2	10	—	9	—	—	28	88	16	—	KOR: 294,948; JPN: 15,357	KMCA: Platinum
"—" denotes releases that did not chart or were not released in that region.

=== Japanese studio albums ===
List of Girls' Generation Japanese studio albums
Title	Details	Peak chart positions		Sales	Certifications
Title	Details	JPN	JPN Sales	Sales	Certifications
Girls' Generation	Released: June 1, 2011; Label: Nayutawave; Formats: CD, digital download	1	1	JPN: 871,000; KOR: 29,000	RIAJ: Million
Girls & Peace	Released: November 28, 2012; Label: Nayutawave, Universal; Formats: CD, digital download	3	3	JPN: 204,000; KOR: 1,600	RIAJ: Platinum
Love & Peace	Released: December 10, 2013; Label: Nayutawave, Universal; Formats: CD, digital download	1	2	JPN: 171,000; KOR: 1,700	RIAJ: Gold

=== Reissues ===
List of reissues, with selected details, chart positions and sales
Title	Details	Peak chart positions	Sales
Title	Details	KOR	Sales
Baby Baby	Released: March 13, 2008 (KOR); Label: SM Entertainment; Formats: CD, cassette, digital download	11	KOR: 102,034
Run Devil Run	Released: March 22, 2010 (KOR); Label: SM Entertainment; Formats: CD, digital download	1	KOR: 191,779 (Note: Sales in 2010 – 136,851 and sales from January 2011 to July 2022 – 54,928); JPN: 26,751
Re:package Album "Girls' Generation" ~The Boys~	Released: December 28, 2011 (JPN); Label: Nayutawave; Formats: CD, digital download	—	
"—" denotes releases that did not chart or were not released in that region.

=== Live albums ===
List of live albums, with selected chart positions and sales figures
Title	Details	Peak chart positions	Sales
Title	Details	KOR	Sales
Into the New World	Release: December 30, 2010; Label: SM Entertainment; Formats: CD, digital download	1	KOR: 101,899 (Note: Sales in 2010 – 44,999 and sales from January 2011 to July 2022 – 56,900)
2011 Girls' Generation Tour	Release: April 11, 2013; Label: SM Entertainment; Formats: CD, digital download	1	KOR: 21,500; JPN: 4,800

=== Compilation albums ===
List of compilation albums with selected chart positions, sales figures and certifications
Title	Details	Peak chart positions	Sales	Certifications
Title	Details	JPN	Sales	Certifications
Best Selection Non Stop Mix	Released: March 20, 2013 (JPN); Label: Nayutawave; Formats: CD, digital download	6	JPN: 24,600	
The Best	Released: July 23, 2014 (JPN); Re-released (The Best: New Edition): October 10, 2014 (JPN); Label: EMI Japan; Formats: CD, digital download	1	JPN: 182,800	RIAJ: Gold

=== Video albums ===
List of video albums, with selected chart positions and certifications
Title	Details	Peak chart positions	Sales (Note: Sales figures for video albums consist of DVD and Blu-ray sales.)	Certifications
Title	Details	JPN	Sales	Certifications
Girls in Tokyo	Released: June 18, 2010 (KOR); Language: Korean; Labels: SM Entertainment; Format: DVD	—		
New Beginning of Girls' Generation	Released: August 11, 2010 (JPN); Language: Korean; Label: SM, Universal Japan; Format: DVD	4	JPN: 162,000	RIAJ: Gold
All About Girls' Generation: Paradise in Phuket	Released: June 29, 2011 (KOR); Language: Korean, English; Labels: SM Entertainment; Format: DVD	101		
The 1st Asia Tour: Into the New World	Released: August 17, 2011 (JPN); Language: Korean; Labels: SM Entertainment; Format: DVD	1	JPN: 20,700	
First Japan Tour	Released: December 14, 2011 (JPN); Language: Japanese; Labels: SM Entertainment, Universal Music Japan; Formats: DVD, Blu-ray	1	JPN: 212,000	RIAJ: Gold
Girls' Generation Complete Video Collection	Released: September 26, 2012 (JPN); Language: Korean, Japanese, English; Labels: SM, Universal Japan; Formats: DVD, Blu-ray	1	JPN: 89,000	RIAJ: Gold
2011 Girls' Generation Tour	Released: November 30, 2012 (KOR); Language: Korean, English; Label: SM Entertainment; Format: DVD	—		
Girls & Peace: 2nd Japan Tour	Released: September 18, 2013 (JPN); Language: Japanese; Label: SM, Universal Japan; Format: DVD, Blu-ray	1	JPN: 77,000	
Girls' Generation in Las Vegas	Released: August 27, 2014 (JPN); Language: Korean, English; Labels: SM Entertainment; Format: DVD	—		
Love & Peace: 3rd Japan Tour	Released: December 24, 2014 (JPN); Language: Japanese; Labels: SM, Universal Japan; Format: DVD, Blu-ray	3	JPN: 48,300	
Girls' Generation – World Tour: Girls & Peace in Seoul	Released: March 30, 2015 (KOR); Language: Korean, Japanese, Chinese (simplified); Labels: SM Entertainment; Format: DVD	—		
"The Best Live" at Tokyo Dome	Released: April 1, 2015 (JPN); Language: Japanese; Labels: SM, Universal Japan; Format: DVD, Blu-ray	1	JPN: 37,000	
Girls' Generation–Phantasia-in Japan	Released: May 4, 2016 (JPN); Language: Japanese; Labels: SM, Universal Japan; Format: DVD, Blu-ray	2	JPN: 27,300	
Girls' Generation 4th Tour 'Phantasia' in Seoul	Released: May 30, 2017 (KOR); Language: Korean; Labels: SM Entertainment; Format: DVD, Blu-ray	—		
"—" denotes releases that did not chart or were not released in that region.

== Extended plays ==
List of extended plays, with selected chart positions, sales figures and certifications
Title	Details	Peak chart positions				Sales	Certifications
Title	Details	KOR	JPN	US	US World	Sales	Certifications
Gee	Released: January 7, 2009; Label: SM Entertainment; Formats: CD, digital download	6 (Note: The EP was released before the official launch of the Circle Music Chart in 2010. It peaked at number 6 on the weekly album chart.)	—	—	—	KOR: 100,000+	
Genie	Released: June 29, 2009; Label: SM Entertainment; Formats: CD, digital download	4 (Note: The EP was released before the official launch of the Circle Music Chart in 2010. It peaked at number 4 on the weekly album chart.)	—	—	—	KOR: 100,000+	
Hoot	Released: October 27, 2010; Label: SM Entertainment, Nayutawave; Formats: CD, digital download	1	2	—	—	KOR: 206,110 (Note: Sales in 2010 – 163,066 and sales from January 2011 to July 2022 – 43,044); JPN: 149,000	RIAJ: Gold
Mr.Mr.	Released: February 24, 2014; Label: SM Entertainment; Formats: CD, digital download	1	11	110	3	KOR: 174,931; JPN: 22,500; US: 3,000	
"—" denotes releases that did not chart or were not released in that region.

== Singles ==
=== Korean singles ===
List of Girls' Generation Korean singles
Title	Year	Peak chart positions							Sales	Album
Title	Year	KOR	KOR Hot	JPN Hot	SGP	US World	VIE	WW	Sales	Album
"Into the New World" (다시 만난 세계)	2007	176 (Note: Charted in 2024.)	—	—	—	—	—	—	KOR: 44,800 (phy.) (Note: Physical sales figures for "Into the New World", combined by the MIAK in 2007 and 2008, and the Gaon Chart after 2010.)	Girls' Generation (2007)
"Girls' Generation" (소녀시대)	2007	—	—	—	—	—	—	—		Girls' Generation (2007)
"Kissing You"	2008	—	—	—	—	—	—	—		Girls' Generation (2007)
"Baby Baby"	2008	—	—	—	—	—	—	—		Girls' Generation (2007)
"Gee"	2009	75	—	—	—	—	—	—	US: 80,000	Gee
"Genie" (소원을 말해봐)	2009	88	—	—	—	—	—	—		Genie
"Oh!"	2010	1	—	—	—	—	—	—	KOR: 3,317,000	Oh!
"Run Devil Run"	2010	1	—	—	—	—	—	—	KOR: 2,203,000	Run Devil Run
"Hoot" (훗)	2010	1	—	—	—	—	—	—	KOR: 2,280,000	Hoot
"The Boys"	2011	1	1	12	—	—	—	—	KOR: 3,623,000	The Boys
"Mr. Taxi" (Korean version)	2011	9	—	—	—	—	—	—	KOR: 1,534,000	The Boys
"Dancing Queen"	2012	1	2	—	—	5	—	—	KOR: 1,025,000 (Note: Cumulative sales figures for "Dancing Queen" in 2012 and 2013)	I Got a Boy
"I Got a Boy"	2013	1	1	98	—	3	—	—	KOR: 1,355,000	I Got a Boy
"Mr.Mr."	2014	1	3	—	—	4	—	—	KOR: 910,000	Mr.Mr.
"Catch Me If You Can"	2015	19	—	—	—	2	—	—	KOR: 135,000	Non-album single
"Party"	2015	1 (Note: "Party" also charted at number 2 on Gaon Album Chart.)	—	10	—	4	—	—	KOR: 844,000; KOR: 81,443 (phy.)	Lion Heart
"Lion Heart"	2015	4	—	49	—	3	—	—	KOR: 1,120,000	Lion Heart
"You Think"	2015	30	—	—	—	3	—	—	KOR: 112,000	Lion Heart
"Sailing (0805)" (그 여름 (0805))	2016	13	—	—	—	6	—	—	KOR: 171,000	SM Station Season 1
"All Night"	2017	32	79	—	—	5	—	—	KOR: 150,000	Holiday Night
"Holiday"	2017	12	16	32	—	6	—	—	KOR: 385,000	Holiday Night
"Forever 1"	2022	5	3	56	7	4	13	67		Forever 1
"—" denotes releases that did not chart or were not released in that region.

=== Japanese singles ===
List of Girls' Generation Japanese singles
Title	Year	Peak chart positions					Sales	Certifications	Album
Title	Year	KOR	JPN	JPN Hot	JPN RIAJ (Note: Sales figures for Chaku-Uta full (cellphone downloads), Chaku-Uta (ringtones) and regular digital downloads were compiled by the RIAJ Digital Track Chart until July 27, 2012.)	US World	Sales	Certifications	Album
"Genie"	2010	— (Note: "Genie" (Japanese version) charted at number 2 on the Gaon Album Chart.)	4	4	8	—	JPN: 151,000 (phy.); KOR: 12,000 (phy.)	RIAJ: Gold (phy.); Platinum (rt.); Platinum (PC)	Girls' Generation (2011)
"Gee"	2010	— (Note: "Gee" (Japanese version) charted at number 3 on the Gaon Album Chart.)	2	2	1	—	JPN: 206,000 (phy.); KOR: 11,000 (phy.)	RIAJ: Gold (phy.); Million (dig.); Gold (st.)	Girls' Generation (2011)
"Mr. Taxi"	2011	18 (Note: "Mr. Taxi"/"Run Devil Run" (Japanese version) charted at number 1 on the Gaon Album Chart.)	2	1	5	12	JPN: 174,000 (phy.); KOR: 13,000 (phy.)	RIAJ: Gold (phy.); Million (dig.) (Note: Digital certification for "Mr. Taxi"); Gold (rt.) (Note: Ringtone certification for "Run Devil Run")	Girls' Generation (2011)
"Run Devil Run"	2011	—	2	19	—	4	JPN: 174,000 (phy.); KOR: 13,000 (phy.)	RIAJ: Gold (phy.); Million (dig.); Gold (rt.)	Girls' Generation (2011)
"Paparazzi"	2012	— (Note: "Paparazzi" charted at number 1 on the Gaon Album Chart.)	2	1	2	20	JPN: 136,000 (phy.); KOR: 15,000 (phy.)	RIAJ: Gold (phy.); Gold (PC)	Girls & Peace
"All My Love Is for You"	2012	—	1	21	—	—			Girls & Peace
"Oh!"	2012	—	1	1	—	—	JPN: 85,000 (phy.)	RIAJ: Gold (phy.); Gold (dig.)	Girls & Peace
"Flower Power"	2012	—	5	—	6	—	JPN: 39,000 (phy.)		Girls & Peace
"Love & Girls"	2013	165 (Note: "Love & Girls" charted at number 7 on the Gaon International Digital Chart.)	4	—	3	—	JPN: 55,000 (phy.)		Love & Peace
"Galaxy Supernova"	2013	— (Note: "Galaxy Supernova" charted at number 17 on the Gaon International Digital Chart.)	3	—	4	—	JPN: 70,000 (phy.)	RIAJ: Gold (dig.)	Love & Peace
"My Oh My"	2013	149 (Note: "My Oh My" charted at number 10 on the Gaon International Digital Chart.)	—	—	—	—			Love & Peace
"Catch Me If You Can"	2015	—	8	—	9	—	JPN: 28,000 (phy.)		Non-album single
"—" denotes releases that did not chart or were not released in that region.

=== English singles ===
List of Girls' Generation English singles
Title	Year	Peak chart positions			Sales	Album
Title	Year	KOR	KOR Hot	US Hot Dance	Sales	Album
"The Boys"	2012	62	85	5	US: 21,000; KOR: 131,294	The Boys

=== Promotional singles ===
List of promotional singles, with selected chart positions, showing year released and album name
Title	Year	Peak chart positions		Sales	Album
Title	Year	KOR	JPN Hot	Sales	Album
"Haptic Motion" (햅틱모션) (Note: Song credited as Girls' Generation, but only performed by members Taeyeon, Jessica, Sunny, and Seohyun.)	2008	—	—		Non-album singles
"Mabinogi (It's Fantastic!)" (Note: Song credited as Girls' Generation, but only performed by members Jessica, Tiffany, and Seohyun)	2008	—	—		Non-album singles
"I Can't Bear It Anymore (Bear song)"	2008	—	—		Non-album singles
"Holding Your Hand" (손을 잡아요) (with Super Junior, SS501, Jewelry and more)	2008	—	—		Non-album singles
"HaHaHa Song" (하하하송)	2009	—	—		Non-album singles
"Seoul" (Note: Song credited as Girls' Generation and Super Junior, but only performed Taeyeon, Jessica, Sunny, Seohyun, and Super Junior members.) (with Super Junior)	2009	—	—		Non-album singles
"Bogeul Bogeul Song" (보글보글 송)	2009	—	—		Non-album singles
"Chocolate Love" (Retro Pop version)	2009	178	—		Non-album singles
"Goobne Song" (굽네 송)	2009	—	—		Non-album singles
"Cabi Song" (Note: Song credited as Girls' Generation with 2PM, but only performed Taeyeon, Jessica, Tiffany, Seohyun, and 2PM members.) (with 2PM)	2010	35	—		Non-album singles
"LaLaLa" (랄랄라) (MBC voting song)	2010	—	—		Non-album singles
"Hey Cooky!"	2010	—	—		Non-album singles
"Haechi" (해치) (Note: Song credited as Girls' Generation, but only performed by members Taeyeon, Jessica, Sunny, Tiffany, and Seohyun.)	2010	—	—		My Friend Haechi
"Visual Dreams"	2011	32	—	KOR: 4,261	Non-album single
"Bad Girl"	2011	145	—		Girls' Generation (2011)
"Time Machine"	2012	—	14		Girls' Generation (2011)
"Indestructible"	2014	—	89		The Best
"Divine"	2014	—	—		The Best
"—" denotes releases that did not chart or were not released in that region.

== Other charted songs ==
List of songs, with selected chart positions, showing year released, sales and album name
Title	Year	Peak chart positions				Sales	Album
Title	Year	KOR (Note: Positions for Korean-language songs are from the Gaon Digital Chart, while positions for Japanese-language songs are from the Gaon International Digital Chart.)	KOR Hot	JPN Hot	US World	Sales	Album
"Show! Show! Show!"	2010	14	—	—	—	KOR: 1,020,000	Oh!
"Sweet Talking Baby" (뻔 & Fun)	2010	23	—	—	—		Oh!
"Forever" (영원히 너와 꿈꾸고 싶다)	2010	24	—	—	—		Oh!
"Be Happy" (웃자)	2010	26	—	—	—		Oh!
"Boys & Girls" (화성인 바이러스) (featuring Key)	2010	25	—	—	—		Oh!
"Talk to Me" (카라멜 커피) (Note: Song credited as Girls' Generation, but only performed by members Jessica and Tiffany)	2010	28	—	—	—		Oh!
"Star Star Star" (별별별 (☆★☆))	2010	7	—	—	—	KOR: 1,480,000	Oh!
"Stick Wit U" (무조건 해피엔딩)	2010	31	—	—	—		Oh!
"Day By Day" (좋은 일만 생각하기) (Note: Song credited as Girls' Generation, but only performed by members Taeyeon, Jessica, Tiffany, Seohyun, and Sunny)	2010	27	—	—	—		Oh!
"Echo"	2010	17	—	—	—		Run Devil Run
"Mistake" (내 잘못이죠)	2010	40	—	—	—		Hoot
"My Best Friend" (단짝)	2010	55	—	—	—		Hoot
"Wake Up"	2010	75	—	—	—		Hoot
"Snowy Wish" (첫눈에…)	2010	42	—	—	—		Hoot
"Let It Rain"	2011	—	—	62	—		Girls' Generation (2011)
"Telepathy" (텔레파시)	2011	23	26	—	—	KOR: 467,930	The Boys
"Say Yes"	2011	31	37	—	—	KOR: 377,854	The Boys
"Trick"	2011	24	33	—	—	KOR: 423,729	The Boys
"How Great Is Your Love" (봄날)	2011	27	31	—	—	KOR: 427,250	The Boys
"My J"	2011	44	61	—	—	KOR: 266,318	The Boys
"Oscar"	2011	42	72	—	—	KOR: 262,048	The Boys
"Top Secret"	2011	37	46	—	—	KOR: 360,954	The Boys
"Lazy Girl (Dolce Far Niente)"	2011	43	71	—	—	KOR: 260,423	The Boys
"Sunflower" (제자리걸음)	2011	41	67	—	—	KOR: 263,055	The Boys
"Vitamin" (비타민)	2011	35	41	—	—	KOR: 375,067	The Boys
"Baby Maybe"	2013	21	29	—	—	KOR: 196,401	I Got a Boy
"Talk Talk" (말해봐)	2013	28	49	—	18	KOR: 147,315	I Got a Boy
"Promise"	2013	31	48	—	—	KOR: 139,453	I Got a Boy
"Express 999"	2013	14	35	—	—	KOR: 292,000	I Got a Boy
"Lost in Love" (유리아이) (Note: Song credited as Girls' Generation, but only performed by members Taeyeon and Tiffany)	2013	30	45	—	—	KOR: 172,408	I Got a Boy
"Look at Me"	2013	41	67	—	—	KOR: 110,080	I Got a Boy
"XYZ"	2013	42	76	—	—	KOR: 103,888	I Got a Boy
"Romantic St." (낭만길)	2013	38	56	—	22	KOR: 129,336	I Got a Boy
"Linguafranc" (リンガ・フランカ)	2013	59	—	—	—		Love & Peace
"Gossip Girls"	2013	41	—	—	—	KOR: 4,086	Love & Peace
"Everyday Love"	2013	45	—	—	—	KOR: 3,602	Love & Peace
"Lips"	2013	46	—	—	—	KOR: 3,776	Love & Peace
"Motorcycle"	2013	48	—	—	—	KOR: 3,608	Love & Peace
"Flyers"	2013	49	—	—	—	KOR: 3,609	Love & Peace
"Karma Butterfly"	2013	52	—	—	—	KOR: 3,155	Love & Peace
"Beep Beep"	2013	90	—	—	—		Love & Peace
"Do the Catwalk"	2013	56	—	—	—		Love & Peace
"Goodbye"	2014	10	23	—	—	KOR: 292,000	Mr.Mr.
"Wait a Minute"	2014	18	43	—	—	KOR: 194,060	Mr.Mr.
"Back Hug" (백허그)	2014	24	62	—	—	KOR: 83,250	Mr.Mr.
"Europa" (유로파)	2014	25	64	—	—	KOR: 81,771	Mr.Mr.
"Soul"	2014	33	83	—	—	KOR: 72,647	Mr.Mr.
"Girls"	2015	152	—	—	7	KOR: 19,894	Catch Me If You Can
"Check"	2015	27	—	90	9	KOR: 93,873	Lion Heart
"Green Light"	2015	— (Note: "Green Light" charted at number 97 on the Gaon Domestic Digital Chart.)	—	—	—	KOR: 27,826	Lion Heart
"One Afternoon" (어떤 오후)	2015	— (Note: "One Afternoon" charted at number 65 on the Gaon Domestic Download Chart.)	—	—	—	KOR: 25,358	Lion Heart
"Paradise"	2015	— (Note: "Paradise" charted at number 77 on the Gaon Domestic Download Chart.)	—	—	—	KOR: 22,614	Lion Heart
"Bump It" (예감)	2015	— (Note: "Bump It" charted at number 78 on the Gaon Domestic Download Chart.)	—	—	—	KOR: 22,606	Lion Heart
"Fire Alarm"	2015	— (Note: "Fire Alarm" charted at number 80 on the Gaon Domestic Download Chart.)	—	—	—	KOR: 22,553	Lion Heart
"Talk Talk"	2015	— (Note: "Talk Talk" charted at number 90 on the Gaon Domestic Download Chart.)	—	—	—	KOR: 20,299	Lion Heart
"Fan"	2017	— (Note: "Fan" charted at number 99 on the Gaon Domestic Download Chart.)	—	—	—	KOR: 16,389	Holiday Night
"Lucky Like That"	2022	159	—	—	—	—N/a	Forever 1
"My Everything"	2025	— (Note: "My Everything" did not enter the Circle Digital Chart; it peaked at number 68 on the component Download Chart.)	—	—	—	—N/a	2025 SM Town: The Culture, the Future
"—" denotes songs that did not chart.

== Other appearances ==
List of non-single guest appearances, showing year released and album name
Title	Year	Album
"Touch the Sky"	2007	Thirty Thousand Miles in Search of My Son OST
"Only Love" (사랑 하나죠) (as part of SM Town)	2007	07 Winter SMTown
"Love Melody"	2007	07 Winter SMTown
"A Small Craft" (작은배)	2008	Hong Gil-dong OST
"Hate-Love" (오빠나빠) (with Roommate)	2008	Roommate 1st Mini Album
"Lallalla" (랄랄라) (with Yoon Sang)	2008	Yoon Sang Song Book: Play with Him
"Motion"	2009	Heading to the Ground OST
"Diamond"	2011	2011 Winter SMTown: The Warmest Gift
"Find Your Soul" (Note: "Find Your Soul" was used as a promotional song for the video game Blade & Soul in China.)	2013	Non-album song
"Cheap Creeper"	2014	Make Your Move OST

== See also ==
- Girls' Generation videography
