= The Best (Girls' Generation album) =

- Digital and Regular edition cover

Greatest hits album by Girls' Generation
- Released: July 23, 2014
- Recorded: 2010–2014
- Language: Japanese
- Label: EMI Records Japan

Girls' Generation chronology
Mr.Mr. (2014)	The Best (2014)	Lion Heart (2015)

Singles from THE BEST
- 1. "Indestructible" Released: July 23, 2014; 2. "Divine" Released: October 15, 2014

New Edition cover
- Standard edition cover

Music video
- "Indestructible" on YouTube "Divine" on YouTube

The Best is the first Japanese compilation album by South Korean girl group Girls' Generation. It was released on July 23, 2014, in Japan through EMI Records Japan. The album was released in three different editions, regular and two limited, with the latter containing a DVD or Blu-ray, an extra CD and a photobook. The album originally contains all of the group's previous Japanese singles, while including a previously unreleased Japanese version of "Mr.Mr." and an original track, titled "Indestructible".

A new edition titled The Best (New Edition) was released on October 15, 2014. The album was released in two editions, standard and a CD+DVD, with the latter containing five new songs, two previously released Japanese versions and three new songs, "Chain Reaction", "Show Girls" and the single "Divine". Upon its release, The Best attained commercial success for the girl group, becoming their third, and to date, final chart-topper on the Oricon Albums Chart.

== Background and release ==
On July 23, The Best topped the Japan's Oricon daily music chart, selling more than 37,000 copies. After the 1st week, the album sold more than 75,000 copies, topping the weekly chart as well. The group, as a result of this achievement, has set a new record to become the first non-Japanese female group in Asia to ever have three Japanese albums, along with Girls' Generation (2011) and Love & Peace (2013), scoring 1st place on the chart. The album spent two weeks at number one on the Oricon chart, and has sold more than 175,000 copies by the end of the year. It is, to date, the group's final Japanese major release, and subsequently the group's last overall release to feature member Jessica before her departure from the group on September 30, 2014.

== New songs ==
"Indestructible", released as a promotional single, was produced by Claire Rodrigues, Albi Albertsson, Chris Meyer, and written by Kamikaoru. Lyrically, the pop ballad talks about the indestructible relationship that two people, who are in love, share with each other, implying similar sentiments that Girls' Generation feels with one another as well as with their fans. "This indestructible, unbreakable bond that can never be broken/Our soul is a twin soul (twin soul)/For example, even if it looks like you’re about to fall from a cliff/At least know that I won’t let go of your hand." The song was showcased for the first time as a lyric music video during Girls' Generation's last stop of their third Japan tour in Tokyo between July 11–13, 2014. The music video was subsequently officially released on August 1, 2014.

"Divine", released as the second promotional single, and was produced by Stephan Elfgren, Albi Albertsson, Sean Alexander and written by Kamikaoru, There were two versions for the accompanied music video. The first version, featured with a background story, was released on September 29, 2014. The second version, featured the appearances of Girls' Generation members, was released on October 14, 2014. This is also the last official single and music video featuring former member Jessica.

"Chain Reaction", was written by Kesha, E. Kidd Bogart, Michael Busbee, and Michael Brooks Linney. It was first produced for Kesha but later was sold to Girls' Generation.

== Promotion and live performances ==
=== Tokyo Dome concert ===
To commemorate their fourth anniversary debut in Japan, Girls' Generation held a concert titled "Girls' Generation 'The Best Live' at Tokyo Dome" on December 9, 2014. SM Entertainment announced on August 25 that the group would hold a concert commemorating their fourth anniversary debut in Japan at Tokyo Dome. Girls' Generation became the second K-pop girl group after Kara to hold a concert there. The concert gathered an audience of 50,000 attendees. This is the first concert without former member Jessica, who left the group on September 30, 2014.

Set list

1. "Flower Power"
2. "Motorcycle"
3. "Mr. Taxi" (Japanese Version)
4. "Galaxy Supernova"
5. "Mr.Mr." (Japanese Version)
6. "Karma Butterfly"
7. "The Great Escape"
8. "Animal" / "Hoot" (Japanese Version, Medley)
9. "Run Devil Run" (Japanese Version)
10. "T.O.P" / "The Boys" / "Reflection" (Japanese Version, Medley)
11. "Genie" (Japanese Version)
12. "Bad Girl"
13. "Divine"
14. "Indestructible"
15. "Show Girls"
16. "Paparazzi"
17. "Chain Reaction"
18. "My Oh My"
19. "Kissing You"
20. "Flyers"
21. "Love & Girls"
22. "Blue Jeans"
23. "Gee" (Japanese Version)
24. "Not Alone"
25. "Into the New World" (Ballad Version)

Encore

1. "I Got a Boy"
2. "Do The Catwalk"
3. "All My Love Is for You"

DVD release

Girls' Generation "The Best Live" at Tokyo Dome, was released on DVD and Blu-ray on April 1, 2015. it is the eleventh release from Girls' Generation. Both versions included live footage and a 100-page photobook.

== Track listing ==
The Best – Standard edition
No.	Title	Lyrics	Music	Original album	Length
1.	"Genie" (Japanese version)	Kanata Nakamura, Yoo Young-jin	Fridolin Nordso Schjoldan, Nermin Harambašić, Robin Jenssen, Ronny Svendsen, Anne Judith Wik, Yoo Young-jin	Girls' Generation	3:42
2.	"Gee" (Japanese version)	Kanata Nakamura, E-Tribe	E-Tribe	Girls' Generation	3:21
3.	"Run Devil Run" (Japanese version)	Kanata Nakamura, Hong Ji-Yu	Alex James, Michael Busbee, Kalle Engström	Girls' Generation	3:21
4.	"Mr. Taxi"	STY	STY, Scott Mann, Chad Royce, Paolo Prudencio, Allison Veltz	Girls' Generation	3:33
5.	"Bad Girl"	Hiro	Hiro, Jörgen Elofsson, Jesper Jakobson, Lauren Dyson	Girls' Generation	3:44
6.	"Time Machine"	Andy Love, Hiro	Robert Habolin, Marlene Strand	The Boys (Reissue)	3:53
7.	"Paparazzi"	Fredrik Thomander, Johan Becker, Junji Ishiwatari	Miles Walker	Girls & Peace	3:47
8.	"Oh!" (Japanese version)	Kenzie, Nozomi Maezawa, Kim Jungbae, Kim Younghu	Kenzie	Girls & Peace	3:09
9.	"All My Love Is for You"	Junji Ishiwatari, Sebastian Thott, Didrik Thott, Robin Lerner	Sebastian Thott	Girls & Peace	3:43
10.	"Flower Power"	Johan Gustafson, Fredrik Häggstam, Sebastian Lundberg, Nasa Aprisia Florida, Junji Ishiwatari	Trinity	Girls & Peace	3:18
11.	"Beep Beep"	Jeff Miyahara, Anne Judith Wik, Ronny Svendsen, Nermin Harambašić, Robin Jenssen	Dsign Music	Love & Peace	3:21
12.	"Love & Girls"	Kamikaoru	Erik Lidbom, Ronny Svendsen, Anne Judith Wik	Love & Peace	3:07
13.	"Galaxy Supernova"	Kamikaoru, Frederik Nordsø Schjoldan, Fridolin N. Schjoldan, Martin Hedegaard	Kamikaoru, Frederik Nordsø Schjoldan, Fridolin N. Schjoldan, Martin Hedegaard	Love & Peace	3:09
14.	"My Oh My"	Erik Lewander, Ylva Dimberg, Louis Schoorl	Erik Lewander, Ylva Dimberg, Louis Schoorl	Love & Peace	3:10
15.	"Mr.Mr." (Japanese version)	Kim Hee Jeong, Cho Yoon Kyung	The Underdogs	Previously unreleased	3:55
16.	"Indestructible"	Kamikaoru	Claire Rodrigues, Albi Albertsson, Chris Meyer	Previously unreleased	3:39

First Press Limited Edition – DVD
No.	Title	Length
1.	"Genie" (Japanese dance version)
2.	"Gee" (Japanese dance version)
3.	"Run Devil Run" (Japanese dance version)
4.	"Mr. Taxi" (Dance version)
5.	"Paparazzi" (Dance edit gold version)
6.	"Oh!" (Japanese dance version)
7.	"Flower Power" (Dance version)
8.	"Love & Girls" (Dance version)
9.	"Galaxy Supernova" (Dance version)
10.	"Genie" (Music video look back)
11.	"Gee" (Music video look back)
12.	"Mr. Taxi" (Music video look back)
13.	"Run Devil Run" (Music video look back)
14.	"Bad Girl" (Music video look back)
15.	"Time Machine" (Music video look back)
16.	"Paparazzi" (Music video look back)
17.	"Oh!" (Music video look back)
18.	"All My Love is For You" (Music video look back)
19.	"Flower Power" (Music video look back)
20.	"Love & Girls" (Music video look back)
21.	"Galaxy Supernova" (Music video look back)
22.	"My oh My" (Music video look back)
23.	"Girls' Generation The Interview"
24.	"Making of The Best" (Location)

Complete Limited Edition
No.	Title	Lyrics	Music	From the album	Length
1.	"Genie" (Japanese version)	Kanata Nakamura, Yoo Young-jin	Fridolin Nordso Schjoldan, Nermin Harambašić, Robin Jensen, Ronny Svendsen, Anne Judith Wik, Yoo Young-jin	Girls' Generation	3:42
2.	"Gee" (Japanese version)	Kanata Nakamura, E-Tribe	E-Tribe	Girls' Generation	3:21
3.	"Run Devil Run" (Japanese version)	Kanata Nakamura, Hong Ji-Yu	Alex James, Michael Busbee, Kalle Engström	Girls' Generation	3:21
4.	"Mr. Taxi"	STY	STY, Scott Mann, Chad Royce, Paolo Prudencio, Allison Veltz	Girls' Generation	3:33
5.	"Bad Girl"	Hiro	Hiro, Jörgen Elofsson, Jesper Jakobson, Lauren Dyson	Girls' Generation	3:44
6.	"Hoot" (Japanese version)	Kanata Nakamura, John Hyunkyu Lee	Alex James, Lars Halvor Jensen, Martin Michael Larsson	Girls' Generation	3:17
7.	"The Boys" (Japanese version)	Yoo Young-jin	DOM, Richard Garcia, Taesung Kim, Teddy Riley	Girls' Generation Re:package Album ~The Boys~	3:51
8.	"Time Machine"	Andy Love, Hiro	Robert Habolin, Marlene Strand	Girls' Generation Re:package Album ~The Boys~	3:53
9.	"Paparazzi"	Fredrik Thomander, Johan Becker, Junji Ishiwatari	Miles Walker	Girls & Peace	3:47
10.	"Oh!" (Japanese version)	Kenzie, Nozomi Maezawa, Kim Jungbae, Kim Younghu	Kenzie	Girls & Peace	3:09
11.	"All My Love Is for You"	Junji Ishiwatari, Sebastian Thott, Didrik Thott, Robin Lerner	Sebastian Thott	Girls & Peace	3:43
12.	"Flower Power"	Johan Gustafson, Fredrik Häggstam, Sebastian Lundberg, Nasa Aprisia Florida, Junji Ishiwatari	Trinity	Girls & Peace	3:18
13.	"Beep Beep"	Jeff Miyahara, Anne Judith Wik, Ronny Svendsen, Nermin Harambašić, Robin Jenssen	Dsign Music	Love & Peace	3:21
14.	"Love & Girls"	Kamikaoru	Erik Lidbom, Ronny Svendsen, Anne Judith Wik	Love & Peace	3:07
15.	"Galaxy Supernova"	Kamikaoru, Frederik Nordsø Schjoldan, Fridolin N. Schjoldan, Martin Hedegaard	Kamikaoru, Frederik Nordsø Schjoldan, Fridolin N. Schjoldan, Martin Hedegaard	Love & Peace	3:09
16.	"My oh My"	Erik Lewander, Ylva Dimberg, Louis Schoorl	Erik Lewander, Ylva Dimberg, Louis Schoorl	Love & Peace	3:10
17.	"Mr.Mr." (Japanese version)	Kim Hee Jeong, Cho Yoon Kyung	The Underdogs	Previously unreleased	3:55
18.	"Indestructible"	Kamikaoru	Claire Rodrigues, Albi Albertsson, Chris Meyer	Previously unreleased	3:39

Complete Limited Edition Disc 2: Member's recommendations (CD)
No.	Title	Lyrics	Music	From the album	Length
1.	"The Great Escape" (recommended by Hyoyeon)	STY	STY, Andre Merritt, E.Kidd Bogart, Greg Ogan, Spencer Nezey	Girls' Generation	3:49
2.	"Blue Jeans" (recommended by Jessica)	Obie Mhondera, Tim Hawes, Katerina Bramley, Tom Diekmeier	Obie Mhondera, Tim Hawes, Katerina Bramley, Tom Diekmeier	Love & Peace	3:28
3.	"Flyers" (recommended by Seohyun)	Steven Lee, Sebastian Thott, Didrik Thott	Sebastian Thott	Love & Peace	4:03
4.	"Not Alone" (recommended by Sooyoung)	Erik Nyholm, Patrick Hamilton	Erik Nyholm, Patrick Hamilton	Girls & Peace	3:31
5.	"Karma Butterfly" (recommended by Sunny)	Grace Tither, Christian Vinten	Christian Vinten	Love & Peace	3:12
6.	"Stay Girls" (recommended by Taeyeon)	Sebastian Thott, Andreas Öberg, Melanie Fontana, Kenn Kato	Sebastian Thott	Girls & Peace	3:20
7.	"Let It Rain" (recommended by Tiffany)	Hiro	Hiro, Love, Habolin	Girls' Generation	3:40
8.	"Born to Be a Lady" (recommended by Yoona)	Kanata Nakamura	Leah Haywood, Daniel James, Shelly Peiken	Girls' Generation	3:56
9.	"Beautiful Stranger" (recommended by Yuri)	Hiro	Hiro, Leah Haywood, Daniel James, Carl Sturken, Evan Rogers	Girls' Generation	2:42
10.	"Into the New World" (bonus track)	Kim Jeong Bae	Kenzie	Baby Baby	4:25
11.	"Kissing You" (bonus track)	Lee Jae Myung	Lee Jae Myung	Baby Baby	3:18
12.	"Gee" (Korean ver.) (bonus track)	E-Tribe	E-Tribe	Gee	3:20
13.	"Mr. Taxi" (Korean ver.) (bonus track)	STY	STY, Scott Mann, Chad Royce, Paolo Prudencio, Allison Veltz	The Boys / Mr. Taxi	3:32
14.	"Dancing Queen" (bonus track)	Yoon Hyo-sang, Jessica Jung, Tiffany Hwang	Stephen Andrew Booker, Aimee Ann Duffy, Kenzie	I Got a Boy	3:35
15.	"I Got a Boy" (bonus track)	Yoo Young Jin	Will Simms, Anne Judith Wik, Sarah Lundbäck Bell, Yoo Young Jin	I Got a Boy	4:31

Complete Limited Edition (Blu-ray)
No.	Title	Length
1.	"Genie" (Japanese version)
2.	"Genie" (Japanese dance version)
3.	"Gee" (Japanese version)
4.	"Gee" (Japanese dance version)
5.	"Run Devil Run" (Japanese version)
6.	"Run Devil Run" (Japanese dance version)
7.	"Mr. Taxi"
8.	"Mr. Taxi" (Dance version)
9.	"Bad Girl"
10.	"Time Machine"
11.	"Paparazzi"
12.	"Paparazzi" (dance edit gold version)
13.	"Oh!" (Japanese version)
14.	"Oh!" (Japanese dance version)
15.	"All My Love is For You"
16.	"Flower Power"
17.	"Flower Power" (dance version)
18.	"Beep Beep"
19.	"Love & Girls"
20.	"Love & Girls" (dance version)
21.	"Galaxy Supernova"
22.	"Galaxy Supernova" (dance version)
23.	"My oh My"
24.	"Into The New World"
25.	"少女時代"
26.	"Kissing You"
27.	"Gee" (Korean version)
28.	"Genie" (Korean version)
29.	"Oh!" (Korean version)
30.	"Run Devil Run" (Korean version)
31.	"Run Devil Run" (Korean story version)
32.	"Hoot"
33.	"Hoot" (dance version)
34.	"The Boys"
35.	"The Boys" (English version)
36.	"I Got a Boy"
37.	"Mr. Mr."
38.	"Everyday Love" (From Free Live "LOVE&PEACE" in Yokohama-Arena 2013.12.14)
39.	"Mr. Taxi" (Split Screen version)
40.	"Girls' Generation The Interview"
41.	"Making of The Best" (studio)
42.	"Girls' Generation Live History 2010-2014"

Famima Edition (CD only)
No.	Title	Length
1.	"Genie" (Japanese version)	3:42
2.	"Gee" (Japanese version)	3:21
3.	"Run Devil Run" (Japanese version)	3:21
4.	"Mr. Taxi"	3:33
5.	"Paparazzi"	3:47
6.	"Oh!" (Japanese version)	3:09
7.	"Flower Power"	3:18
8.	"Love & Girls"	3:07
9.	"Galaxy Supernova"	3:09
10.	"Chain Reaction"	3:06

The Best ~New Edition~ (Standard Edition) CD Only
No.	Title	Length
1.	"Genie" (Japanese version)	3:42
2.	"Gee" (Japanese version)	3:21
3.	"Mr. Taxi"	3:33
4.	"Paparazzi"	3:47
5.	"Oh!" (Japanese version)	3:09
6.	"Flower Power"	3:18
7.	"Love & Girls"	3:07
8.	"Galaxy Supernova"	3:09
9.	"Indestructible"	3:39
10.	"Divine"	4:09

The Best ~New Edition~ Limited Edition CD
No.	Title	Length
1.	"Genie" (Japanese version)	3:42
2.	"Gee" (Japanese version)	3:21
3.	"Mr. Taxi"	3:33
4.	"Oh!" (Japanese version)	3:09
5.	"Run Devil Run" (Japanese version)	3:21
6.	"Hoot" (Japanese version)	3:17
7.	"The Boys" (Japanese version)	3:51
8.	"Paparazzi"	3:47
9.	"Flower Power"	3:18
10.	"Love & Girls"	3:07
11.	"Galaxy Supernova"	3:09
12.	"Mr. Mr." (Japanese version)	3:55
13.	"Chain Reaction"	3:06
14.	"Indestructible"	3:39
15.	"Divine"	4:09
16.	"Show Girls"	3:38

The Best ~New Edition~ Limited Edition DVD
No.	Title	Length
1.	"Divine" (music video)
2.	"Indestructible" (lyrics video)
3.	"Divine" (music video behind the scenes)
4.	"Making of Photo shooting"

== Charts and certifications ==
=== Weekly charts ===
Chart (2014)	Peak position
Japanese Albums (Oricon)	1
Japanese Top Albums (Billboard)	1
Taiwan (G-Music)	1

Chart (2015)	Peak position
Taiwan (G-Music)	4

=== Year-end charts ===
Chart (2014)	Position
Japanese Albums (Oricon)	22
Japanese Top Albums (Billboard)	29

Chart (2015)	Position
Taiwan (G-Music)	9

=== Certifications ===
Region	Certification
Japan (RIAJ)	Gold

== Release history ==
Region	Title	Date	Edition	Format	Label
Japan	The Best	July 23, 2014	Normal	CD	Universal Music
Japan	The Best	July 23, 2014	First Press Limited	CD+DVD+Photobook	Universal Music
Japan	The Best	July 23, 2014	Complete	2CD+Blu-ray+Booklet+Trading Card Set	Universal Music
Japan	The Best (New Edition)	October 15, 2014	Standard	CD	Universal Music
Japan	The Best (New Edition)	October 15, 2014	Limited	CD+DVD+Earphone Jack	Universal Music
