= Love & Peace Japan 3rd Tour =

2014 concert tour by Girls' Generation

- Tour by Girls' Generation
- Location: Japan
- Associated album: Love & Peace
- Start date: April 26, 2014
- End date: July 13, 2014
- No. of shows: 18
- Attendance: 200,000
- Box office: $19,178,280

Girls' Generation concert chronology
- Girls & Peace Japan 2nd Tour (2013–14); Love & Peace Japan 3rd Tour (2014); Girls' Generation's Phantasia (2015)

Love & Peace Japan 3rd Tour is the third concert tour by South Korean girl group Girls' Generation to promote their third Japanese album, Love & Peace. It gathered an audience of 200,000 attendees. This is the final tour to include former member Jessica Jung, who left the group on September 30, 2014.

The tour attracted a total of 200,000 people. Through three concert tours in Japan since 2011, the group attracted a cumulative total of 550,000 spectators, setting the record for a K-pop girl group.

== Background ==
It was announced on November 29, 2013, that Girls' Generation would embark on their third nationwide Japan tour on April 26, 2014, with an initial total of 17 stops in support of their third Japanese studio album, Love & Peace.

== Concerts ==
At their latest three-day concert series held in Tokyo from July 11, the group performed "Gee," "I Got a Boy," "Mr. Mr," as well as tracks such as "Motorcycle" and "Gossip Girls" on their third Japanese full-length album. The group also unveiled a new track titled "Indestructible" from their compilation album The Best, which was released on July 23, 2014.

== Commercial performance ==
All reserved seats for the Love & Peace Japan 3rd Tour were priced at ¥9,800 (US$96). The tour attracted 200,000 people, with media outlets estimating the tour's gross revenue at $19.2 million ($26.11 million in 2025 dollars). With the success of the tour, Girls' Generation attracted a total of 550,000 fans with 51 concerts from their three Japanese tours since 2011, marking the highest amount gathered by a girl group from South Korea.

== Bradcast ==
TV Media Wowow filmed, once again, the group's July 13, 2014, performance at Yoyogi National Stadium. The show aired on Wowow's music channel on September 23, including many shows from the girls.

== Set list ==
Set list in Tokyo (July 13, 2014)
1. "Motorcycle"
2. "Gossip Girls"
3. "Galaxy Supernova"
4. "Flower Power"
5. "You-aholic"
6. "Karma Butterfly"
7. "The Great Escape"
8. "Lips"
9. "My Oh My"
10. "Do the Catwalk"
11. "Lingua Franca"
12. "Europa"
13. "Girls & Peace"
14. "Time Machine"
15. "Not Alone"
16. "All My Love Is for You" (Acoustic)
17. "Genie" (Japanese Version)
18. "Paparazzi"
19. "Mr.Mr." (Japanese Version)
20. "Beep Beep"
21. "Flyers"
22. "Gee" (Japanese Version)
23. "Love & Girls"
24. "Everyday Love"

Encore

1. "Mr. Taxi"
2. "I Got a Boy"
3. "Blue Jeans"
4. "Stay Girls"

Double Encore

1. "Indestructible"
2. "Love & Girls"

Double encore was only performed at Tokyo, July 2014 as the last concert of the tour.

The present of "Indestructible" only it was a "Lyric Video" of this song.
Set list in Saitama (June 27, 2014)
1. "Motorcycle"
2. "Gossip Girls"
3. "Galaxy Supernova"
4. "You-aholic"
5. "Karma Butterfly"
6. "The Great Escape"
7. "Time Machine"
8. "Not Alone"
9. "Genie" (Japanese Version)
10. "Paparazzi"
11. "Hoot"
12. "Flyers"
13. "Gee" (Japanese Version)
14. "Kissing You"
15. "Into the New World"
16. "Everyday Love"
17. "Mr. Taxi"
18. "I Got a Boy"
19. "Stay Girls"

== Tour dates ==
List of concert dates
Date	City	Venue	Attendance	Revenue
April 26, 2014	Fukuoka	Marine Messe Fukuoka	200,000	$19,178,280
April 27, 2014	Fukuoka	Marine Messe Fukuoka	200,000	$19,178,280
May 6, 2014	Hiroshima	Hiroshima Green Arena	200,000	$19,178,280
May 7, 2014	Hiroshima	Hiroshima Green Arena	200,000	$19,178,280
May 23, 2014	Kobe	World Memorial Hall	200,000	$19,178,280
May 24, 2014	Kobe	World Memorial Hall	200,000	$19,178,280
May 25, 2014	Kobe	World Memorial Hall	200,000	$19,178,280
June 5, 2014	Nagoya	Nippon Gaishi Hall	200,000	$19,178,280
June 6, 2014	Nagoya	Nippon Gaishi Hall	200,000	$19,178,280
June 19, 2014	Osaka	Osaka-jō Hall	200,000	$19,178,280
June 20, 2014	Osaka	Osaka-jō Hall	200,000	$19,178,280
June 21, 2014	Osaka	Osaka-jō Hall	200,000	$19,178,280
June 27, 2014	Saitama	Saitama Super Arena	200,000	$19,178,280
June 28, 2014	Saitama	Saitama Super Arena	200,000	$19,178,280
June 29, 2014	Saitama	Saitama Super Arena	200,000	$19,178,280
July 11, 2014	Tokyo	Yoyogi National Gymnasium	200,000	$19,178,280
July 12, 2014	Tokyo	Yoyogi National Gymnasium	200,000	$19,178,280
July 13, 2014	Tokyo	Yoyogi National Gymnasium	200,000	$19,178,280
Total			200,000	$19,178,280

== DVD ==
Girls' Generation Love & Peace Japan 3rd Tour

Video by Girls' Generation
- Released: December 24, 2014
- Recorded: 2014
- Genres: K-pop, J-pop
- Labels: SM Entertainment, Nayutawave Records

Girls' Generation chronology
Girls & Peace: 2nd Japan Tour (2013)	Girls' Generation Love & Peace Japan 3rd Tour (2014)

Girls' Generation Love & Peace Japan 3rd Tour is the tenth DVD and Blu-ray release from South Korean girl group Girls' Generation. It was released on December 24, 2014, in Japan.

=== History ===
The DVD and Blu-ray features their third nationwide tour, visiting seven venues for a total of 17 shows. There will be four different versions: a DVD and Blu-ray version, both with a regular and limited edition. The limited editions will come with special footage content, a 44-page photobook pamphlet, and a tour documentary.

=== Track list ===
1. Motorcycle
2. Gossip Girls
3. Galaxy Supernova
4. Flower Power
5. MC
6. You-aholic
7. Karma Butterfly
8. The Great Escape
9. Movie
10. Lips
11. My Oh My
12. Do the Catwalk
13. Movie
14. Lingua Franca
15. Europa
16. Girls & Peace
17. Movie
18. Time Machine
19. Not Alone
20. MC
21. All My Love Is for You
22. Movie
23. Genie (Japanese Version)
24. Paparazzi
25. Mr. Mr. (Japanese Version)
26. Movie
27. Beep Beep
28. Flyers
29. Gee (Japanese Version)
30. Love & Girls
31. MC
32. Everyday Love
33. Movie
34. Mr. Taxi
35. I Got a Boy
36. Blue Jeans
37. MC
38. Stay Girls

Limited Edition DVD

1. Tour Diary
2. Documentary “2014 Tour Final Day”

=== Charts ===
Chart (2014)	Peak position
Japanese DVD Chart (Oricon)	2

=== Sales ===
Chart	Amount
DVD (Oricon)	25,701
Blu-ray (Oricon)	20,878

=== Release history ===
Country	Date	Format	Label
Japan	December 24, 2014	DVD, Blu-ray Disc	Nayutawave Records
