= Girls' Generation's Phantasia =

2015–16 concert tour by Girls' Generation

- Tour by Girls' Generation
- Promotional poster of the tour in Seoul
- Location: Asia
- Associated album: Lion Heart
- Start date: November 21, 2015
- End date: May 8, 2016
- No. of shows: 13
- Attendance: 135,000
- Box office: $22.3M

Girls' Generation concert chronology
- Love & Peace Japan 3rd Tour (2014); Girls' Generation's Phantasia (2015–16)

Girls' Generation's Phantasia was the fourth concert tour headlined by South Korean girl group Girls' Generation, in support of their fifth studio album Lion Heart (2015). The tour was officially announced in October 2015, began on November 21, 2015, and concluded on May 8, 2016, consisting of 13 shows. The tour was their first and, currently, the only tour for the group as an 8-member girl group.

== History ==
The tour was officially announced by their company SM Entertainment on October 15, 2015, with two dates in Seoul at the Olympic Gymnastics Arena. This made Girls' Generation the first K-pop group to headline four concert tours.

Back on August 11, 2015, Girls' Generation announced their fourth Japan Tour will start from December 12, 2015, in Nagoya with six dated in Nagoya, Kobe and Saitama. On November 17, 2015, it was announced on Girls' Generation's official Japanese fanclub website that the separate Japan tour announced in August 2015 would be titled Girls' Generation 4th Tour -Phantasia- in Japan and the tour dates already announced would be part of their 4th tour. The tour was directed by choreographer Rino Nakasone.

== Set lists ==
Set list in Seoul
1. "You Think"
2. "Tell Me Your Wish (Genie)" (Remix Jazz Version)
3. "Bump it"
4. "Show Girls" (Korean version)
5. "One Afternoon"
6. "Paparazzi"
7. "Kissing You"
8. "Green Light"
9. "Paradise"
10. "Adrenaline" (TTS performance)
11. "Sugar" (by Maroon 5) (Yoona and Sunny)
12. "Push It" (by Salt-N-Pepa) (Yuri, Sooyoung and Hyoyeon)
13. "Lion Heart"
14. "Check"
15. "Gee"
16. "Mr.Mr."
17. "Sign"
18. "The Great Escape Intro" / "Run Devil Run"
19. "Mr. Taxi" (Remix)
20. "Catch Me If You Can" (Korean Ver.)
21. "Fire Alarm"
22. "The Boys"
23. "Into the New World" (Ballad Dome Ver.)

Encore

1. "Snowy Wish"
2. "Diamond"
3. "Love & Girls" (Christmas Ver.)
4. "Party" (Winter Ver.)
Set list in Nagoya
1. "You Think"
2. "Tell Me Your Wish (Genie)" (Remix Jazz Ver)
3. "Bump it"
4. "Show Girls"
5. "Girls"
6. "Paparazzi"
7. "Kissing You"
8. "Green Light"
9. "Paradise"
10. "Adrenaline" (TTS performance)
11. "Sugar" (by Maroon5) (Yoona and Sunny)
12. "Push It" (by Salt-N-Pepa) (Yuri, Sooyoung and Hyoyeon)
13. "Lion Heart"
14. "Party"
15. "Gee"
16. "Mr. Mr."
17. "Sign"
18. "The Great Escape Intro" / "Run Devil Run"
19. "Mr.Taxi" (Remix)
20. "Catch Me If You Can"
21. "Fire Alarm"
22. "The Boys"
23. "Indestructible"

Encore

1. "Snowy Wish"
2. "Diamond"
3. "Love & Girls" (Christmas Ver)
Set list in Kobe
1. "You Think"
2. "Tell Me Your Wish (Genie)" (Remix Jazz Ver)
3. "Bump it"
4. "Show Girls"
5. "Girls"
6. "Paparazzi"
7. "Merry Go Round" / "Kissing You"
8. "Oh! / Beep Beep"
9. "Paradise"
10. "Adrenaline" (TTS performance)
11. "Sugar" (by Maroon5) (Yoona and Sunny)
12. "Push It" (by Salt-N-Pepa) (Yuri, Sooyoung and Hyoyeon)
13. "Lion Heart"
14. "Party"
15. "Gee"
16. "Mr. Mr."
17. ""Galaxy Supernova"
18. "The Great Escape Intro" / "Run Devil Run"
19. "Mr.Taxi" (Remix)
20. "Catch Me If You Can"
21. "Fire Alarm"
22. "The Boys"
23. "Indestructible"

Encore

1. "Snowy Wish"
2. "Flyers"
3. "Love & Girls" (Christmas Ver)
Set list in Saitama
1. "You Think"
2. "Tell Me Your Wish (Genie)" (Remix Jazz Ver)
3. "Bump it"
4. "Show Girls"
5. "Paparazzi"
6. "Merry Go Round Intro" / "Kissing You"
7. "Oh! / Beep Beep"
8. "Paradise"
9. "Adrenaline" (TTS performance)
10. "Sugar" (by Maroon5) (Yoona and Sunny)
11. "Push It" (by Salt-N-Pepa) (Yuri, Sooyoung and Hyoyeon)
12. "Lion Heart"
13. "Party"
14. "Gee"
15. "Mr. Mr."
16. "Galaxy Supernova"
17. "The Great Escape Intro" / "Run Devil Run"
18. "Mr.Taxi" (Remix)
19. "Catch Me If You Can"
20. "Fire Alarm"
21. "The Boys"
22. "Indestructible"

Encore

1. "Snowy Wish"
2. "Flyers"
3. "Love & Girls" (Christmas Ver)
Set list in Bangkok
1. "You Think"
2. "Tell Me Your Wish (Genie)" (Remix Jazz Ver)
3. "Bump it"
4. "Show Girls"
5. "Paparazzi"
6. "Kissing You"
7. "Green Light"
8. "Paradise"
9. "Adrenaline" (TTS performance)
10. "Sugar" (by Maroon 5) (Yoona and Sunny)
11. "Push It" (by Salt-N-Pepa) (Yuri, Sooyoung and Hyoyeon)
12. "Lion Heart"
13. "Hoot"
14. "Gee"
15. "Mr. Mr."
16. "Sign"
17. "The Great Escape Intro" / "Run Devil Run"
18. "Mr.Taxi" (Remix)
19. "Catch Me If You Can"
20. "Fire Alarm"
21. "The Boys"
22. "Into the New World" (Ballad Dome Ver.)

Encore

1. "Love & Girls"
2. "Way To Go"
3. "Check" (requested song from the audiences, performed only on the second day)
4. "Party"
Set list in Jakarta
1. "You Think"
2. "Tell Me Your Wish (Genie)" (Remix Jazz Ver)
3. "Bump it"
4. "Show Girls"
5. "Paparazzi"
6. "Kissing You"
7. "Green Light"
8. "Paradise"
9. "Adrenaline" (TTS performance)
10. "Sugar" (by Maroon 5) (Yoona and Sunny)
11. "Push It" (by Salt-N-Pepa) (Yuri, Sooyoung and Hyoyeon)
12. "Lion Heart"
13. "Hoot"
14. "Gee"
15. "Mr. Mr."
16. "Sign"
17. "The Great Escape Intro" / "Run Devil Run"
18. "Mr.Taxi" (Remix)
19. "Catch Me If You Can"
20. "Fire Alarm"
21. "The Boys"
22. "Into the New World" (Ballad Dome Ver.)

Encore

1. "Love & Girls"
2. "Way To Go"
3. "Party"
Set list in Taipei
1. "You Think"
2. "Tell Me Your Wish (Genie)" (Remix Jazz Ver)
3. "Bump it"
4. "Show Girls"
5. "Paparazzi"
6. "Kissing You"
7. "Green Light"
8. "Paradise"
9. "Adrenaline" (TTS performance)
10. "Sugar" (by Maroon 5) (Yoona and Sunny)
11. "Push It" (by Salt-N-Pepa) (Sooyoung, Hyoyeon and Yuri)
12. "Lion Heart"
13. "Hoot"
14. "Gee"
15. "Mr. Mr."
16. "Sign"
17. "The Great Escape Intro" / "Run Devil Run"
18. "Mr.Taxi" (Remix)
19. "Catch Me If You Can"
20. "Fire Alarm"
21. "The Boys"
22. "Into the New World" (Ballad Dome Ver.)

Encore

1. "Love & Girls"
2. "Way To Go"
3. "Party"

== Tour dates ==
List of tour dates
| Date | City | Country | Venue | Attendance |
|---|---|---|---|---|
| November 21, 2015 | Seoul | South Korea | Olympic Gymnastics Arena | 20,000 |
| November 22, 2015 | Seoul | South Korea | Olympic Gymnastics Arena | 20,000 |
| December 12, 2015 | Nagoya | Japan | Nippon Gaishi Hall | 70,000 |
| December 18, 2015 | Kobe | Japan | World Memorial Hall | 70,000 |
| December 19, 2015 | Kobe | Japan | World Memorial Hall | 70,000 |
| December 20, 2015 | Kobe | Japan | World Memorial Hall | 70,000 |
| December 23, 2015 | Saitama | Japan | Saitama Super Arena | 70,000 |
| December 24, 2015 | Saitama | Japan | Saitama Super Arena | 70,000 |
| January 30, 2016 | Bangkok | Thailand | Impact Arena | 20,000 |
| January 31, 2016 | Bangkok | Thailand | Impact Arena | 20,000 |
| April 16, 2016 | Tangerang | Indonesia | Indonesia Convention Exhibition | 5,000 |
| May 7, 2016 | Taipei | Taiwan | Taipei Arena | 20,000 |
| May 8, 2016 | Taipei | Taiwan | Taipei Arena | 20,000 |
| Total | | | | 135,000 |

== Personnel ==
- Artist: Taeyeon, Sunny, Tiffany, Hyoyeon, Yuri, Sooyoung, Yoona, Seohyun
- Tour organizer: S.M. Entertainment, Dream Maker Entertainment, SM True (Thailand), MecimaPro (Indonesia), Super Dome (Taiwan)

== DVD ==
Girls' Generation–Phantasia-in Japan

Video by Girls' Generation
- Released: May 4, 2016
- Recorded: December 2015
- Language: Japanese
- Label: EMI Records Japan

Girls' Generation–Phantasia-in Japan is the thirteenth DVD and Blu-ray release from South Korean girl group Girls' Generation. It was released on May 4, 2016, in Japan.

=== History ===
The DVD and Blu-ray features their second worldwide tour, visiting more than 7 venues for a total of 13 shows. There will be two different versions: a DVD and Blu-ray version. Both editions will come with footage content, a 48-page photobook pamphlet and a tour documentary.

=== Track list ===
1. You Think
2. Genie
3. Bump It
4. Show Girls
5. One Afternoon
6. Paparazzi
7. Kissing you
8. Oh! Beep Beep
9. Paradise
10. Adrenaline
11. Sugar
12. Push It
13. Lion Heart
14. Party
15. Gee
16. Mr.Mr.
17. Galaxy Supernova
18. Run Devil Run Mr. Taxi
19. Catch Me If You Can
20. Fire Alarm
21. The Boys
22. Indestructible
23. Snowy Wish
24. Flyers
25. Love & Girls
26. Girls' Generation Story of Phantasia from Girls' Generation 4th Tour

=== Release history ===
| Country | Date | Format | Label |
|---|---|---|---|
| Japan | May 4, 2016 | DVD, Blu-ray Disc | EMI Records Japan |
