= New Beginning of Girls' Generation =

Video by Girls' Generation
- Released: August 11, 2010
- Recorded: 2007–2010
- Genre: K-pop, Electropop, bubblegum pop, Dance-pop, synthpop
- Length: 27 minutes
- Language: Korean, Japanese
- Label: S.M. Entertainment, Nayutawave Records

Girls' Generation chronology
Girls in Tokyo (2010)	New Beginning of Girls' Generation (2010)	All About Girls’ Generation: Paradise in Phuket (2011)

New Beginning of Girls' Generation is the second music DVD release from South Korean girl group Girls' Generation. It was released on August 11, 2010 in Japan.

== History ==
The DVD was released, both the Regular and Limited Editions. The DVD contains the music videos of Genie, Gee, Oh, Run Devil Run, Into the New World, Girls’ Generation, and Kissing You, and a special video only in this package. The First Press Limited Edition contains, along with the DVD, the invitation for 2 to their Japanese Showcase at Tokyo’s Ariake Coliseum on August 25, as well as includes a pass and a glow stick.

== Track list ==
No.	Title	Length
1.	"Genie"	4:02
2.	"Oh!"	3:34
3.	"Run Devil Run"	3:47
4.	"Gee"	3:54
5.	"Into The New World"	4:53
6.	"Girls' Generation"	3:56
7.	"Kissing You"	3:21

== Charts ==
Chart	Peak position	Chart Run
Oricon Daily DVD Chart	1	79 weeks
Oricon Weekly DVD Chart	3	79 weeks

=== Sales and certifications ===
Chart	Amount
Oricon physical sales	162,000+
RIAJ physical shipping certification	Gold (100,000+)

== Release history ==
Country	Date	Distributing label	Format
Japan	August 11, 2010	Nayutawave Records	DVD
