= World Memorial Hall =

Multi-purpose arena in Kobe, Japan

Coordinates: 34°39′51″N 135°12′37″E

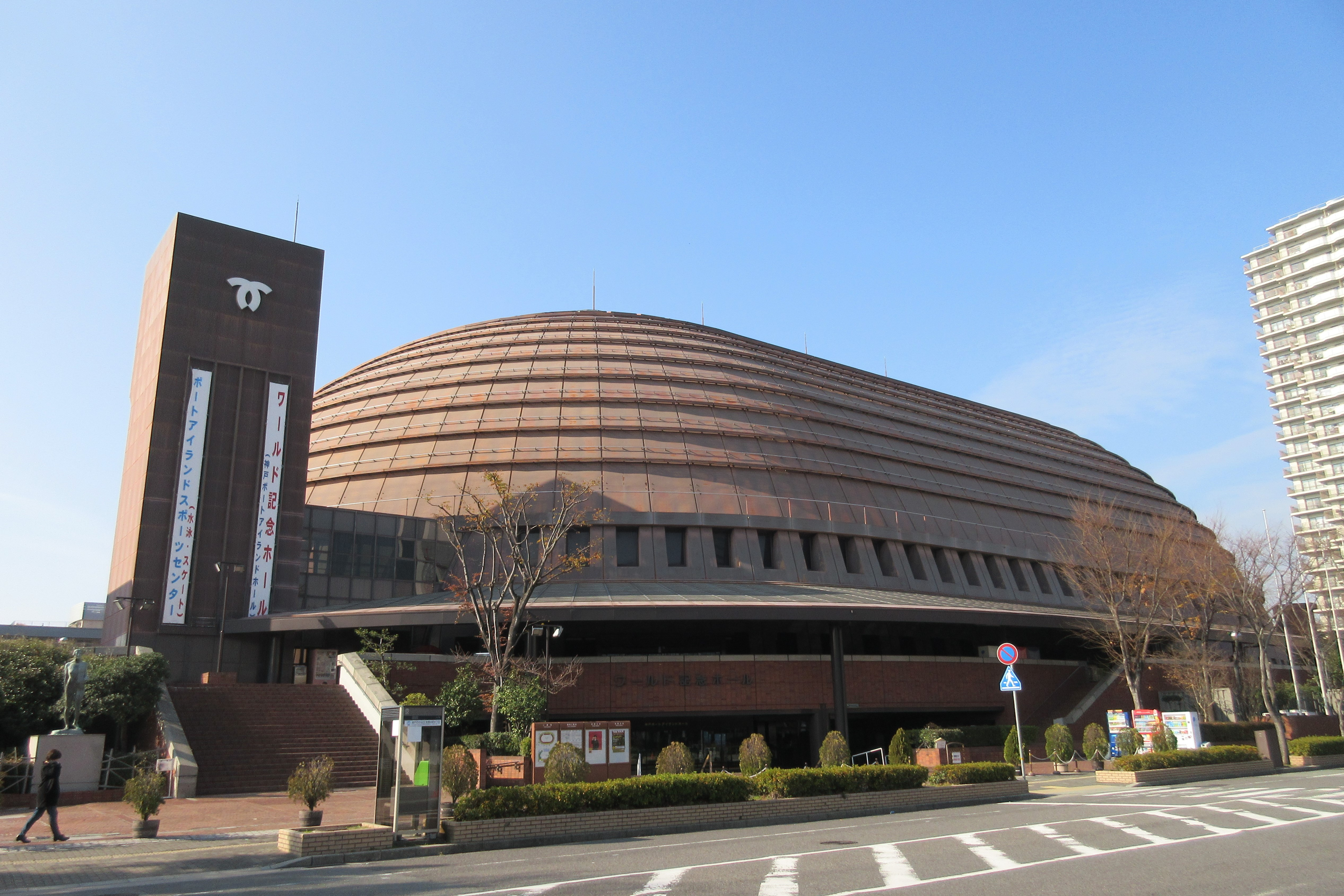
- Interactive map of World Memorial Hall
- Location: Port Island, Chūō-ku, Kobe, Hyōgo, Japan
- Capacity: 8,000 seats

Construction
- Opened: 1984

World Memorial Hall (ワールド記念ホール, Wārudo Kinen Hōru) or World Hall is a multi-purpose arena located in the Chūō-ku Ward of Kobe, Japan. It has a maximum capacity of 8,000 people and is optimized for large-scale meetings, sport events, trade shows and concerts. It is located on the artificial island of Port Island, along with numerous convention centers, hotels and universities.

== Notable events ==
- Cosmopolis Show 1985 opening arena used for Olympics training*
- 6 September 1990, Depeche Mode performed as part of the World Violation Tour
- Host of the official 1991 Asian Basketball Championship
- Since 2003, Dragon Gate has held their largest show of the year, Kobe Puroresu Festival, at the venue in July.
- 12 March 2005, Avril Lavigne performed as part of her Bonez Tour.
- 6 December 2007, Daft Punk performed Alive 2006/2007.
- 22 September 2009: The Black Eyed Peas performed as part of their The E.N.D. World Tour.
- 31 December 2010: Luna Sea performed their first New Year's Eve "countdown concert", as part of their 20th Anniversary World Tour Reboot -to the New Moon- reunion tour.
- 24, 25 September 2011: 2NE1 NOLZA Tour (2011)
- 2 June 2012: 2012 Shinhwa Grand Tour in Japan: The Return – the comeback concert of South Korean boy band Shinhwa, after a four-year hiatus due to mandatory military service.
- Since 2012, New Japan Pro-Wrestling has held their annual September Destruction pay-per-view at the venue.
- 9, 10 February 2013: Girls' Generation, Girls & Peace: 2nd Japan Tour
- 17,18 August 2013: SHINee, Shinee World 2013
- 7, 8 September 2013: T-ara Japan Tour 2013: Treasure Box
- 15, 16 October 2013 : Backstreet Boys performed during their In A World Like This Tour.
- 19, 20 November 2013: B.A.P 1st Japan Tour: Warrior Begins
- 23, 24 November 2013: Kara's 2nd Japan Tour 2013
- 29 March 2014: Lionel Richie All Night Long Tour 2014.
- 23, 24, 25 May 2014: Girls' Generation, Girls' Generation Japan 3rd Tour 2014
- 12, 13 July 2014: 2NE1 AON: All Or Nothing World Tour 2014
- 4, 5 August 2015: Junho from 2PM, 3rd Solo Tour 2015: LAST NIGHT
- 18, 19, 20 December 2015: Girls' Generation, Girls' Generation's Phantasia
- 26, 27 & 28 December 2015: BTS, 2015 BTS LIVE <花樣年華 on stage> Japan Edition
- 20, 21 February 2016: iKON, iKONCERT 2016: Showtime Tour
- 22 January 2017: Guns N' Roses, Not in This Lifetime... Tour
- 15, 16, 18 February 2017: Seventeen, 'LIKE SEVENTEEN – Shining Diamond' in Japan CONCERT
- 19, 20 August 2017: Aqours, "Aqours 2nd Love Live! HAPPY PARTY TRAIN TOUR"
- 20, June 2018: Bullet Train, "Sweetest Battlefield Arena Tour 2018"
- 12, 13, 14 October 2018: Twice, Twice 1st Arena Tour 2018 "BDZ"
- 12, 13 January 2019: Red Velvet, Red Velvet 2nd Concert "REDMARE"
- 2, 3 February 2019: GOT7, GOT7 ARENA SPECIAL 2018–2019 "Road 2 U"
- 5 May 2019: FTISLAND, FTISLAND FIVE TREASURES LIVE TOUR 2019
- 2 June 2019: Rizin 16 – Kobe
- 1 September 2019: Iz*One – IZ*ONE 1st Concert "Eyes On Me"
- 11, 12 June 2022: Stray Kids – Stray Kids 2nd World Tour "Maniac" in Japan
- 4, 5 October 2022: NiziU - NiziU Live with U 2022 "Light It Up"
- 15, 16 October 2022: The Boyz - "THE BOYZ JAPAN TOUR : THE B-ZONE"
- 21, 22, 24, 25 December 2022: Treasure – Treasure Japan Arena Tour 2022–2023
- 23, 24 February 2023: Ive - Ive The 1st Fan Concert <The Prom Queens> in Japan
- 3, 4 June 2023: The Boyz - "THE BOYZ 2ND WORLD TOUR : ZENERATION"
- 10 and 11 June 2023: Kep1er -JAPAN CONCERT TOUR 2023 'FLY-BY'
- 30 and 31 July 2024: BabyMonster- BABYMONSTER PRESENTS: SEE YOU THERE
- 3 and 4 November 2024: Atarashii Gakko! - Nippon Calling Tour 2024
