= Hoot (EP) =

EP by Girls' Generation
- Released: 27 October 2010
- Recorded: August–September 2010
- Genre: K-pop
- Length: 17:34
- Language: Korean
- Labels: SM; Universal Music Group; Dreamus
- Producers: Yoo Young-jin; Kenzie

Girls' Generation chronology
Oh! (2010)	Hoot (2010)	Girls' Generation (2011)

Singles from Hoot
- 1. "Hoot" Released: 25 October 2010

Hoot (Korean: 훗; subtitled 009) is the third extended play by the South Korean girl group Girls' Generation. The extended play contains five songs and was released on 27 October 2010, by SM Entertainment. Hoot was the third best-selling album of 2010 on the Gaon Album Chart, with 163,066 copies sold.

== Composition ==
Contributions to the album's production came from Wheesung, Jinu (Hitchhiker), Kenzie and the former Roommate and Nadia member Hwang Hyun. The title song, "Hoot", was composed by the Danish songwriter-producers Martin Michael Larsson and Lars Halvor Jensen, of Deekay, together with the British songwriter Alex James, with the intention of creating an "exciting up-tempo record for a female artist or group". It was originally titled "Bulletproof" and written with English lyrics.

"Mistake" is the second track and a R&B ballad with lyrics by Kwon Yuri which is about a girl who can't move on from a relationship with a guy who asked her to "wait" for him but in the end he found another and she blames herself for not trying harder to keep the love between them. The third track "My Best Friend" is a contemporary R&B song with lyrics by Wheesung that talks about each other's friendship of Girls' Generation. The fourth track "Wake Up" is an electropop song carrying dark synth beat-sounds with medium tempo shuffle rhythm. "Snowy Wish" is the fifth track and a bright dance-pop song.

== Recording and promotion ==
The song demo was written and recorded in the UK, with Nina Woodford singing the vocal, and then finished and mixed in Denmark. Girls' Generation held their comeback stage show on 29 October 2010 on KBS's Music Bank. It was also performed on Show! Music Core, Inkigayo and M! Countdown. They held their final stage show on 4 December 2010 on MBC's Show! Music Core.

== Reception ==
Music critic Joiseul of IZM gave the EP an unfavorable review and rated it 1 stars out of 5. Commercially, it was reported that Hoot received over 150,000 sales in pre-orders a day before its official release. The album achieved gold status in Japan for selling 100,000 copies. The album is listed by Gaon Album Chart as the third best-selling album of 2010 in South Korea, with 163,066 copies sold. The title track "Hoot" debuted at number one on the Gaon Digital Chart on the chart issue dated 30 October 2010. The song won "triple crown" on Inkigayo on 28 November 2010 and won five times on Music Bank.

== Track listing ==
Credits adapted from Naver

Hoot – Standard edition
No.	Title	Lyrics	Music	Arrangement	Length
1.	"Hoot" (Korean: 훗; RR: Hut)	John Hyunkyu Lee	Alex James (Alex Read); Lars Halvor Jensen; Martin Michael Larsson	Alex James (Alex Read); Lars Halvor Jensen; Martin Michael Larsson	3:18
2.	"Mistake" (내 잘못이죠; Nae Jalmosijyo; lit. 'My Fault')	Kwon Yu-ri	Cheryl Yie; Jean Na	Kenzie	4:07
3.	"My Best Friend" (단짝; Danjjak; lit. 'Buddy')	Wheesung	Carsten Lindberg (Great Dane Productions); Joachim Svares (Great Dane Productions); Joleen Bell; Jade Anderson; Michael Jay	Great Dane Productions; Joleen Bell; Jade Anderson; Michael Jay	3:24
4.	"Wake Up"	Kim Boo-min	Hitchhiker	Hitchhiker	3:15
5.	"Snowy Wish" (첫눈에...; Cheonnune...; lit. 'In the First Snow')	Hwang Hyun (MonoTree)	Hwang Hyun (MonoTree)	MonoTree	3:28
Total length:					17:35

Hoot – Japan limited edition (bonus tracks)
No.	Title	Lyrics	Music	Arrangement	Length
6.	"Gee"	Kim Young-deuk; Ahn Myung-won	Kim Young-deuk; Ahn Myung-won	E-Tribe	3:21
7.	"Genie" (Korean: 소원을 말해봐 (지니); RR: Sowoneul Malhaebwa (Jini); lit. 'Tell Me Your Wish')	Yoo Young-jin	Anne Judith Stokke Wik; Robin Jenssen; Ronny Vidar Svendsen; Nermin Harambašić; Fridolin Nordsø; Yoo Young-jin	Yoo Han-jin	3:49
8.	"Oh!"	Kim Jeong-bae; Young-hu Kim	Kenzie	Kenzie	3:09
9.	"Run Devil Run"	Hong Ji-yoo	Michael Busbee; Alex James (Alex Read); Kalle Engström	Michael Busbee; Alex James (Alex Read); Kalle Engström	3:21
10.	"Show! Show! Show!"	Kim Boo-min	Hitchhiker	Michael Busbee	3:38
11.	"Be Happy" (웃자; Utja)	Kim Young-deuk; Ahn Myung-won	Kim Young-deuk; Ahn Myung-won	E-Tribe; Jang Jun-ho (Duble Kick Entertainment); Gong Hyun-sik (Duble Kick Entertainment	3:30
Total length:					38:22

Hoot – Japan limited edition (DVD)
No.	Title	Length
1.	"Hoot (Music Clip)"	4:12
2.	"Premium Show Case Live in Ariake Colosseum"

== Charts and certifications ==
=== Weekly charts ===
Chart (2010–11)	Peak position
Japan (Oricon)	2
Japanese Top Albums (Billboard)	2
South Korean Albums (Circle)	1

=== Year-end charts ===
Chart (2010)	Position
Korean Albums (Gaon)	3

Chart (2011)	Position
Japan (Oricon)	42
Japanese Top Albums (Billboard)	43
Korean Albums (Gaon)	88

== Sales and certifications ==
Region	Certification	Certified units/sales
Japan (RIAJ)	Gold	100,000^{^}
^{^} Shipments figures based on certification alone.

== Release history ==
Region	Date	Format	Distributor
Worldwide	25 October 2010	Digital download	SM Entertainment
South Korea	27 October 2010	CD	SM Entertainment, KT Music
Hong Kong	2 November 2010	CD	Universal Music Hong Kong
Japan	22 December 2010	CD	Nayutawave Records, Universal Music Japan
Taiwan	24 December 2010	CD	Universal Music Taiwan
