= Love & Peace (Girls' Generation album) =

- Digital and Regular edition cover

Studio album by Girls' Generation
- Released: December 10, 2013
- Recorded: 2012–2013
- Genres: Electropop; dance-pop
- Length: 44:46
- Language: Japanese
- Labels: Nayutawave; Universal Music
- Producer: Nozomu Tsuchiya

Girls' Generation chronology
I Got a Boy (2013)	Love & Peace (2013)	Mr.Mr. (2014)

Singles from Love & Peace
- 1. "Love & Girls" Released: June 19, 2013; 2. "Galaxy Supernova" Released: September 18, 2013

Love & Peace is the third Japanese studio album and seventh overall by South Korean girl group Girls' Generation. The album was released for digital download on December 10, 2013, in selected countries in Asia by Nayutawave Records (Universal Music Group), followed by a physical release in Japan the next day. This was their last overall studio album featuring member Jessica before her departure from the group in September 2014.

Three singles were released prior to the release of the album: "Love & Girls", peaking at number four on the Oricon Chart and at number three on the Japan Hot 100, "Galaxy Supernova", peaking at number three on Oricon as well as number four on the Japan Hot 100 chart and "My Oh My". The album was certified Gold by the Recording Industry Association of Japan (RIAJ) less than a month after its release, for sales of 100,000.

== Background and development ==
The album was physically released in four editions, with each edition containing the same twelve songs. The four editions also feature three different album covers, with the Blu-ray limited edition and DVD limited edition sharing the same cover.

== Release and promotion ==
On October 25, 2013, it was revealed that Girls' Generation will be releasing their third Japanese album on December 11. "Galaxy Supernova", "Love & Girls", "Do The Catwalk", "Lingua Franca", "My Oh My" and "Beep Beep" (B-side from "Flower Power") have all been released prior to the release of this album. A live show subsequently titled as Love & Peace took place on December 14, 2013, at the Yokohama Arena, with tickets distributed through a lottery available to those who purchased the third album.

The album was initially made available for pre-order on iTunes for Hong Kong, India, Sri Lanka, Taiwan, and most of Southeast Asia with "Motorcycle" becoming available for download immediately after purchase. The album was promoted with the tour Girls' Generation Japan 3rd Tour 2014, started on April 26, 2014, in Marine Messe Fukuoka, Fukuoka, Japan. The tour was ended on July 13, 2014, in Yoyogi National Gymnasium, Tokyo, Japan.

== Singles ==
"Love & Girls" served as the lead single from Love & Peace. It was released on June 19, 2013, in Japan by Nayutawave Records and Universal Music Japan. The single debuted at number 4 on the Japanese Oricon Singles Chart, selling 42,796 physical copies within its first week of release. It also peaked at number 3 on the Japan Hot 100.

"Galaxy Supernova" debuted at number four on the Oricon Daily Singles Chart. The single managed to sell 14,564 physical copies on its second day achieving first place in the Oricon Daily Singles Chart. One week after the release, Galaxy Supernova managed to sell 50,793 physical copies.

"My Oh My" was released digitally on November 5, 2013, as a promotional single. The music video depicts the girls dressed in brightly colored outfits, taking revenge on a guy who cheated on his girlfriend by using magic to teach him a lesson. The song "Motorcycle" was released as the second promotional single on December 5, 2013.

== Reception ==
Professional ratings
Review scores
Source	Rating
Rolling Stone Japan	3/5 stars
The Japan Times	(positive)

Love & Peace garnered generally positive reviews from contemporary music critics. Patrick St. Michel from The Japan Times praised the record's composition and wrote that its production "quality is still top notch". Kazuma Namba from Rolling Stone Japan likewise complimented its production quality and wrote that "Even those who find Japanese albums a bit unsatisfactory will be satisfied with the result."

On the day of its physical release, the album debuted on the daily Oricon Albums Chart at number one. After the first week, with sales amounting to about 129,000, it debuted on the weekly Oricon chart at number one as well and number two on Billboard Japan, which resulted in the album being certified Gold by the Recording Industry Association of Japan (RIAJ). Due to receiving significant airplay in Japan, "Motorcycle" charted on the Adult Contemporary Airplay chart of Billboard Japan at number 54, along with "Marry You" by Bruno Mars, "Best Song Ever" by One Direction, "Yuki no Hana" by Mika Nakashima, and eight other songs.

All of the album's tracks charted at various positions from number ten to 126 on the South Korean Gaon international Digital Chart following the release. Love & Peace also debuted at number ten and peaked at number nine with Shíjiān de gē (2013) (Chinese: 時間的歌) by Cheer Chen and two other albums on the Taiwanese albums chart. The album debuted on the monthly Oricon albums chart at number two.

== Track listing ==
Love & Peace – Standard edition
No.	Title	Lyrics	Music	Arrangement	Length
1.	"Gossip Girls"	Kenn Kato	Kanata Okajima; Andreas Öberg; Maria Marcus	Maria Marcus	3:16
2.	"Motorcycle"	Akira (Palm Drive)	Andreas Öberg; Maria Marcus	Maria Marcus	3:31
3.	"Flyers"	Hidenori Tanaka	Steven Lee; Sebastian Thott; Didrik Thott	Steven Lee; Sebastian Thott; Didrik Thott	4:03
4.	"Galaxy Supernova"	Kami Kaoru	Frederik Tao Nordsø Schjoldan; Fridolin Nordsø Schjoldan; Martin Hoberg Hedegaard	Martin Hoberg Hedegaard	3:09
5.	"Love & Girls"	Kami Kaoru	Erik Lidbom; Ronny Svendsen; Anne Judith Wik	Erik Lidbom; Ronny Svendsen; Anne Judith Wik	3:07
6.	"Beep Beep"	Jeff Miyahara; Junji Ishiwatari	Jeff Miyahara; Junji Ishiwatari; Anne Judith Wik; Ronny Vidar Svendsen; Nermin Harambašić; Robin Jenssen	Jeff Miyahara; Junji Ishiwatari; Anne Judith Wik; Ronny Vidar Svendsen; Nermin Harambašić; Robin Jenssen	3:21
7.	"My Oh My"	Kami Kaoru	Erik Lewander (The Kennel); Ylva Dimberg (The Kennel); Louis Schoorl	The Kennel; Louis Schoorl	3:10
8.	"Lips"	Junji Ishiwatari	Daniel "Obi" Klein; Charli Taft	Daniel "Obi" Klein; Charli Taft	3:48
9.	"Do the Catwalk"	Junji Ishiwatari	Kanata Okajima; Andreas Öberg; Maria Marcus	Andreas Öberg	4:01
10.	"Karma Butterfly"	Kami Kaoru	Christian Vinten; Grace Tither	Christian Vinten; Grace Tither	3:12
11.	"Linguafranc" (リンガ・フランカ; Ringa Furanka)	Hidenori Tanaka	Andreas Öberg; Jon Hällgren; Ylva Dimberg (The Kennel)	Andreas Öberg; Jon Hällgren; Ylva Dimberg (The Kennel)	3:11
12.	"Everyday Love"	Sara Sakurai (T's Music)	Tom Diekmeier; Tim Hawes; Obi Mhondera (InnerV8 Musiq); Katerina Bramley (Notting Hill Music)	Tom Diekmeier; Tim Hawes; Obi Mhondera (InnerV8 Musiq); Katerina Bramley (Notting Hill Music)	3:30
13.	"Blue Jeans" (Fanclub Edition Bonus Track)	Akira (Palm Drive)	Erik Lidbom; Andreas Carlsson	Erik Lidbom; Andreas Carlsson	3:28
Total length:					44:46

Deluxe Limited Edition (Blu-ray)
No.	Title	Length
1.	"Beep Beep"
2.	"Love & Girls"
3.	"Galaxy Supernova"
4.	"My Oh My"
5.	"Making of 'Galaxy Supernova'"
6.	"Making of 'My Oh My'"

Blu-ray / DVD Limited Edition (Blu-ray or DVD)
No.	Title	Length
1.	"Beep Beep"
2.	"Love & Girls"
3.	"Love & Girls" (Dance version)
4.	"Galaxy Supernova"
5.	"Galaxy Supernova" (Dance version)
6.	"My Oh My"

== Charts ==
=== Weekly charts ===
Chart (2013–14)	Peak position
Japanese Albums (Oricon)	1
Japanese Top Albums (Billboard)	2

=== Year-end charts ===
Chart (2014)	Position
Japanese Albums (Oricon)	25
Japanese Top Albums (Billboard)	40

== Sales and certifications ==
Region	Certification	Certified units/sales
Japan (RIAJ)	Gold	100,000^{^}
^{^} Shipments figures based on certification alone.

== Release history ==
Countries	Date	Format	Edition	Label
Brunei	December 10, 2013	Digital download	Standard	Nayutawave Records
Cambodia	December 10, 2013	Digital download	Standard	Nayutawave Records
Hong Kong	December 10, 2013	Digital download	Standard	Nayutawave Records
India	December 10, 2013	Digital download	Standard	Nayutawave Records
Indonesia	December 10, 2013	Digital download	Standard	Nayutawave Records
Laos	December 10, 2013	Digital download	Standard	Nayutawave Records
Malaysia	December 10, 2013	Digital download	Standard	Nayutawave Records
Philippines	December 10, 2013	Digital download	Standard	Nayutawave Records
Singapore	December 10, 2013	Digital download	Standard	Nayutawave Records
Sri Lanka	December 10, 2013	Digital download	Standard	Nayutawave Records
Taiwan	December 10, 2013	Digital download	Standard	Nayutawave Records
Thailand	December 10, 2013	Digital download	Standard	Nayutawave Records
Vietnam	December 10, 2013	Digital download	Standard	Nayutawave Records
Japan	December 11, 2013	CD, digital download	Standard	Nayutawave Records
Japan	December 11, 2013	CD+DVD or Blu-ray	First Press Limited	Nayutawave Records
Japan	December 11, 2013	CD+Blu-ray	Limited	Nayutawave Records
Hong Kong	December 11, 2013	CD+DVD or Blu-ray	First Press Limited	Nayutawave Records
South Korea	December 11, 2013	Digital download	Standard	S.M. Entertainment
Australia	December 13, 2013	Digital download	Standard	Nayutawave Records
New Zealand	December 13, 2013	Digital download	Standard	Nayutawave Records
Taiwan	December 18, 2013	CD	Standard	Nayutawave Records
Taiwan	December 23, 2013	CD+Blu-ray	First Press Limited Edition	Nayutawave Records
Austria	February 12, 2014	digital download	standard edition	Nayutawave Records
Belgium	February 12, 2014	digital download	standard edition	Nayutawave Records
Brazil	February 12, 2014	digital download	standard edition	Nayutawave Records
Denmark	February 12, 2014	digital download	standard edition	Nayutawave Records
Germany	February 12, 2014	digital download	standard edition	Nayutawave Records
Finland	February 12, 2014	digital download	standard edition	Nayutawave Records
Greece	February 12, 2014	digital download	standard edition	Nayutawave Records
Hungary	February 12, 2014	digital download	standard edition	Nayutawave Records
Ireland	February 12, 2014	digital download	standard edition	Nayutawave Records
Italy	February 12, 2014	digital download	standard edition	Nayutawave Records
Netherlands	February 12, 2014	digital download	standard edition	Nayutawave Records
Norway	February 12, 2014	digital download	standard edition	Nayutawave Records
Poland	February 12, 2014	digital download	standard edition	Nayutawave Records
Portugal	February 12, 2014	digital download	standard edition	Nayutawave Records
Spain	February 12, 2014	digital download	standard edition	Nayutawave Records
Sweden	February 12, 2014	digital download	standard edition	Nayutawave Records
Switzerland	February 12, 2014	digital download	standard edition	Nayutawave Records
United Kingdom	February 12, 2014	digital download	standard edition	Nayutawave Records
