= Galaxy Supernova =

- Digital and Regular edition cover.

Single by Girls' Generation

from the album Love & Peace
- B-side: "Do the Catwalk"
- Released: September 18, 2013
- Recorded: 2013
- Genre: Electropop
- Length: 3:10
- Label: Nayutawave
- Composers: Frederik Tao Nordsø Schjoldan; Fridolin Nordsø Schjoldan; Kamikaoru; Martin Hoberg Hedegaard
- Lyricist: Kamikaoru

Girls' Generation singles chronology
"Love & Girls" (2013)	"Galaxy Supernova" (2013)	"Mr.Mr." (2014)

Music video
- "Galaxy Supernova" on YouTube

"Galaxy Supernova" is the eighth Japanese single by South Korean girl group Girls' Generation. It was included on the group's third Japanese studio album Love & Peace and was released as the second single from the album on September 18, 2013. The song was written by Frederik Tao Nordsø Schjoldan, Fridolin Nordsø Schjoldan, Kamikaoru, and Martin Hoberg Hedegaard, whilst production was handled by Nozomu Tsuchiya. Musically, "Galaxy Supernova" is an electropop song.

The song received generally favorable reviews from music critics, who praised its music styles and compared the song to the group's previous Japanese singles "Mr. Taxi" and "Paparazzi". The song peaked at number three on the Japanese Oricon Singles Chart and number four on the Japan Hot 100. A music video for the track was released on September 5, 2013. To promote the song, Girls' Generation performed live on music shows Secret Live and Live Monster in Japan.

The song was eventually certified Gold by the Recording Industry Association of Japan for 100,000 single track downloads.

== Background and release ==
"Galaxy Supernova" was written by Frederik Tao Nordsø Schjoldan, Fridolin Nordsø Schjoldan, Kamikaoru, and Martin Hoberg Hedegaard, whilst production was handled by Nozomu Tsuchiya. It is an electropop song that features "pulsing" synthesizers in its composition. It was released as the second single from Girls' Generation's third Japanese album Love & Peace on September 18, 2013. The album was subsequently released in December 2013.

It was released as a CD single in Japan by Nayutawave Records, and includes the B-side track "Do the Catwalk". Meanwhile, the digital single was released in several Asian countries including Japan, Hong Kong, Singapore and Taiwan by Universal Music Group. A limited CD + DVD edition of the single, which included a bonus music video for "Galaxy Supernova", was released in Japan by Nayutawave Records. "Galaxy Supernova" was used in an advertisement campaign for Samantha Thavasa Jeans, the first jeans line from Japanese fashion company Samantha Thavasa, in conjunction with the group's endorsement deal with the brand.

== Reception ==
"Galaxy Supernova"
"Galaxy Supernova" is an electropop song that was compared to the group's previous singles "Mr. Taxi" and "Paparazzi".

"Galaxy Supernova" received generally favorable reviews from music critics. Jeff Benjamin from Billboard praised the song's catchy "earworm hooks" and compared it to the group's previous Japanese singles "Mr. Taxi" and "Paparazzi" for the same electropop production. Patrick St. Michael, writing for The Japan Times, picked "Galaxy Supernova" as one of the outstanding songs that "play to [the group]'s strengths" on its parent album Love & Peace and labelled it a successor to "Mr. Taxi".

"Galaxy Supernova" was a commercial success in Japan. The single took the number four spot on its first day of release on Oricon Daily Singles Chart. The following day, it rose to the number one spot on the Daily Chart, selling 14,565 physical copies. It peaked at number three on the Oricon Weekly Singles Chart, and became the eighth best-selling physical single of September in Japan, selling 62,371 copies. As of December 2016, the single has sold 69,533 copies.

"Galaxy Supernova" debuted at number 39 on the Japan Hot 100—a chart operated by Billboard magazine—on September 23, 2013. The following week, it rose to number four on the chart, which later became its peak. It dropped to number nine on the chart the following week. On the Japan Adult Contemporary Airplay chart, the single debuted at number 75 on September 23, 2013, and later peaked at number six on September 30, 2013. "Galaxy Supernova" also peaked at number 22 on the Hot Top Airplay, and number two on the Hot Singles Sales. The song's music video was the sixth most-viewed K-pop music video on YouTube in 2013.

== Music video and promotion ==
The accompanying music video for "Galaxy Supernova", directed by Toshiyuki Suzuki, was released on September 5, 2013. The video features the members wearing multicolored jeans and outfits, dancing in a "flashy virtual reality world", as described by Benjamin. A behind-the-scenes video was released on September 20, 2013, featuring scenes from the photo shoot for the Samantha Thavasa Jeans collection as well as the group practicing their choreography.

To promote the song in Japan, the group gave a Secret Live performance of "Galaxy Supernova" and "Gee" to 200 fans in Tokyo on the release day of the single and held a "Premium Talk" event on September 19 in Osaka. On November 4, 2013, the group held a live event in Tokyo for 500 people who bought the single. The group performed the song and the Japanese version of "Genie" on the Japanese television music show Live Monster on January 12, 2014.

== Track listings and formats ==
CD and digital download
No.	Title	Lyrics	Music	Arrangement	Length
1.	"Galaxy Supernova"	Frederik Tao Nordsø Schjoldan, Fridolin Nordsø Schjoldan, Kamikaoru, Martin Hoberg Hedegaard	Frederik Tao Nordsø Schjoldan, Fridolin Nordsø Schjoldan, Kamikaoru, Martin Hoberg Hedegaard	Jeff Miyahara	3:10
2.	"Do the Catwalk"	Junji Ishiwatari	Kanata Okajima, Andreas Öberg, Maria Marcus	Maria Marcus	4:01
Total length:					7:11

CD + DVD
No.	Title	Length
1.	"Galaxy Supernova"	3:10
2.	"Do the Catwalk"	4:01
3.	"Galaxy Supernova" (music video)

== Credits and personnel ==
Credits are adapted from the single's liner notes.

- Nozomu Tsuchiya – producer
- Miles Walker – mixing engineer
- Tom Coyne – mastering engineer
- Takaki Kumada – photographer
- Shinya Nakayama – graphic designer
- Toshiyuki Suzuki – art director, music video director
- Toshikazu Abe – music video producer
- Yu Hamashima – music video producer
- Kevin Maher – choreographer
- Rino Nakasone – choreographer
- Shim Jae-won – choreographer

== Charts ==
Chart (2013)	Peak position
Japan (Oricon)	3
Japan Hot 100 (Billboard)	4
South Korean International Singles (Gaon)	17

== Sales and certifications ==
=== Sales ===
Country	Sales
Japan (Oricon)	69,533

=== Certifications ===
Region	Certification	Certified units/sales
Japan (RIAJ)	Gold	100,000^{*}
^{*} Sales figures based on certification alone.

== Release history ==
Region	Date	Format	Distributor
Japan	September 18, 2013	CD	Nayutawave Records
Japan	September 18, 2013	CD + DVD	Nayutawave Records
Japan	September 18, 2013	Digital download	Universal Music Japan
