= Love & Girls =

- Digital and Regular edition cover.

Single by Girls' Generation

from the album Love & Peace
- B-side: "Linguafranc"
- Released: June 19, 2013
- Recorded: 2013
- Genre: Electropop
- Length: 3:07
- Label: S.M.; Nayutawave
- Songwriter: Kamikaoru
- Producers: Erik Lidbom; Ronny Svendsen; Anne Judith Wik

Girls' Generation singles chronology
"I Got a Boy" (2013)	"Love & Girls" (2013)	"Galaxy Supernova" (2013)

Music video
- "Love & Girls" on YouTube

"Love & Girls" is the seventh Japanese single released by South Korean girl group Girls' Generation on June 19, 2013. The song served as the lead single of the group's third Japanese album Love & Peace.

== Background and release ==
It was announced on April 5, 2013, that Girls' Generation would be releasing their first Japanese single of 2013 on May 29. The single was released in two versions: a regular edition and a limited edition with a bonus DVD. The regular edition contains the title track "Love & Girls" and its B-side, "Linguafranca" (Japanese: リンガ・フランカ Ringa furanka). The bonus DVD contains the music video for "Love & Girls". It was initially announced that the music video for "Beep Beep", B-side to "Flower Power", would be on the DVD; however, this was later changed. The single was originally scheduled for a May 29, 2013 release, but due to delays in completion of the "Love & Girls" music video, the release was pushed back to June 19, 2013.

== Music video ==
The music video for "Love & Girls" was filmed on April 17, 2013, with selected female members from Girls' Generation's Japanese fan site participating in the choreography. The video was originally scheduled for release on May 29, 2013, with the single but the release got delayed due to some scenes of the video being altered. A dance version of the music video was published by SM Town on YouTube on June 4, 2013. A video compilation of a live performance of the song at Universal Studios Japan on June 19 and various videos of fans performing the shampoo dance choreography was released on June 23, 2013.

== Commercial performance ==
The single rose from number six to number four the day after it debuted on the daily Oricon Singles Chart. The single was able to sell 42,796 physical copies after one week and peaked at number four on the weekly Oricon Singles Chart. "Love and Girls" peaked at number three on the Billboard Japan Hot 100, the Japanese equivalent of the Billboard Hot 100. It also charted at number four on Billboard Japan's Adult Contemporary Airplay chart, number two on Hot Singles Sales and number twelve on Hot Top Airplay. In South Korea, "Love & Girls" peaked at number seven on the Gaon International Digital Chart and "Linguafranca" at number 59.

== Promotion ==
On June 19, 2013, Girls' Generation performed the song for a flash mob of about 4,000 fans at Universal Studios Japan. Fuji Television aired the performance on Mezamashi TV the following day. The performance was then uploaded to SM Entertainment's official YouTube channel on June 23, 2013.

== Track listing ==
Regular edition
No.	Title	Lyrics	Music	Length
1.	"Love & Girls"	Kamikaoru	Erik Lidbom, Ronny Svendsen, Anne Judith Wik	3:07
2.	"Lingua franca" (リンガ・フランカ Ringa furanka)	Hidenori Tanaka, Agehasprings	Andreas Öberg, Jon Hallgren, Ylva Dimberg	3:07

Limited edition — DVD
No.	Title	Length
3.	"Love & Girls" (music video)

== Charts ==
Chart (2013)	Peak position
Japan (Oricon)	4
Japan Hot 100 (Billboard)	3
Japan Adult Contemporary (Billboard)	4
South Korea (Gaon)	156
South Korean International Singles (Gaon)	7
Taiwan (G-Music)	15

=== Sales ===
Country	Sales
Japan (Oricon)	55,309 (physical)

== Release history ==
Region	Date	Format	Distributor
Worldwide	June 19, 2013	Digital download	S.M. Entertainment, Universal Music Group
Japan	June 19, 2013	CD, DVD, digital download	Nayutawave Records, Universal Music Japan
Taiwan	June 21, 2013	CD, DVD	Universal Music Taiwan
