= Dsign Music =

Music production company

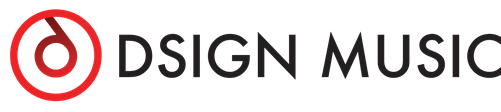
- Type: Aksjeselskap
- Industry: Music & Entertainment
- Genre: J-pop, K-pop, C-pop, dance-pop, electropop, pop, rock, teen pop, musicals, bubblegum pop, Latin pop
- Founded: Trondheim, Norway (2004)
- Headquarters: Trondheim, Norway
- Number of locations: Seoul, Trondheim, Stockholm
- Area served: Worldwide
- Key people: Robin Jenssen: CEO
- Services: Entertainment
- Website: www.dsignmusic.com

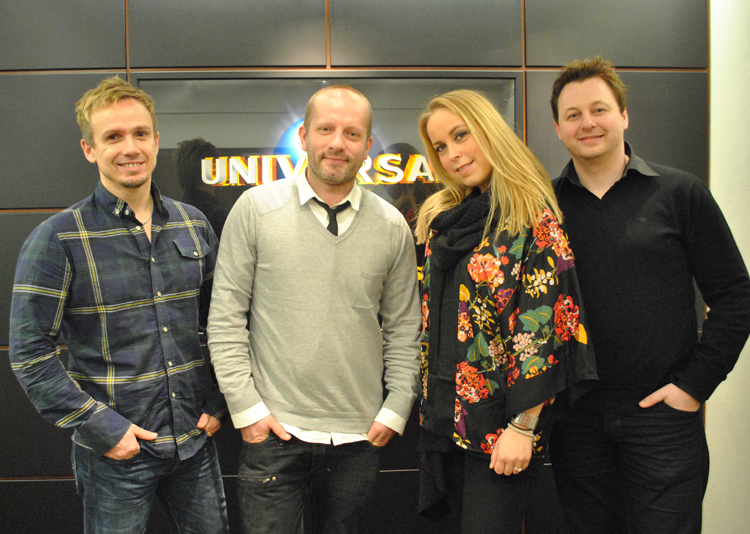
Dsign Music, Ronny Svendsen, Nermin Harambasic, Anne Judith Wik and Robin Jenssen in 2012

Dsign Music is a Norwegian songwriting and music production company, established in 2004 consisting of the members Robin Jenssen, Anne Judith Wik, Ronny Svendsen, Jinbyjin and Adrian Thesen (Pizzapunk). Their output includes around 500 recorded and released songs globally. Dsign Music has produced works for numerous artists around the world, including Twice, Exo, Itzy, Namie Amuro, Arashi, Le Sserafim, Tomorrow X Together, Aespa, Girls' Generation, Red Velvet, NCT, and Zerobaseone.

Dsign Music signed a global exclusive publishing deal with Kreation Music Rights in December 2023. Previously Dsign Music was signed to EKKO between 2016 and 2023, a company they co-founded together with Mr. Lee Soo-man (founder of SM Entertainment in Seoul, Korea) and Australian A&R veteran Mr. Hayden Bell (former A&R Executive of Sony Music). Prior to this, Dsign Music was signed with Universal Music Publishing Group from 2008 until 2016. Dsign Music's presence extends globally through their representation by TONO in the Nordics and Baltics. For the rest of the world, Dsign Music is represented by STIM.

== Members ==
- Robin Jenssen (CEO)
- Anne Judith Stokke Wik (songwriter/topliner/singer/composer)
- Ronny Vidar Svendsen (songwriter/producer/composer)
- Jin Suk Choi aka Jinbyjin (songwriter/producer/composer)
- Adrian Thesen aka Pizzapunk / Heffy Beluga (songwriter/producer/composer)

== Former Members ==
- Nermin Harambašić (songwriter/topliner/producer/composer)
- Edgar Lien (sound engineer/producer)

== Songwriting camps ==
Robin Jenssen is the visionary behind Song:Expo, an annual songwriting camp that was founded in 2011. Song:Expo attracts more than 250 songwriters from across six continents as of 2020. Under Robin Jenssen's leadership, Song:Expo has expanded its reach and held songwriting camps in various cities around the globe. These include Trondheim, Oslo, Hamar, and Kristiandsand in Norway, Stockholm in Sweden, Reykjavik in Iceland, Seoul in Korea, Los Angeles in the United States, Tokyo in Japan, Aarhus in Denmark, Bangkok in Thailand, Lijang in China, and Sofia in Bulgaria.

== Studio locations ==
In February 2024 Kreation Music Rights Europe headed by Robin Jenssen acquired Nortbound Studio in Stockholm. In January 2019, Dsign Music co-founded EKKO Music Lab, a state-of-the-art 13-studio complex situated in Stockholm, Sweden. In January 2020, Dsign Music unveiled their new studio facilities at Musikkbyen in Trondheim, Norway. The complex features a total of 12 studios with Dsign Music's facilities standing as a significant component within it.

== Musicals ==
Dsign Music collaborated on six songs for the hologram musical 'School Oz,' featuring SMTown artists including TVXQ! (Max), EXO (Suho & Xiumin), f(x) (Luna), SHINee (Key), and Red Velvet (Seulgi). In addition, Dsign Music teamed up with Joern-Uwe Fahrenkrog-Petersen, former member of the German pop-group Nena, to co-write the rock musical 'Walhalla.' They have also collaborated with the cabaret musical Shanghai Rose.

== Billboard #1 Placements ==
Dsign Music have either written, co-written, produced and/or co-produced more than 50 Billboard number-one chartings.

1. 16/02/2022: Yunho - "You Go Ahead" - #1 Billboard Japan Hot Albums
2. 16/02/2022: Yunho - "You Go Ahead" - #1 Billboard Japan Top Albums Sales
3. 27/11/2021: Twice - "F.I.L.A. (Fall in Love Again)" from the album Formula of Love: O+T=<3 - #1 Billboard US World Albums
4. 09/10/2021: ITZY - "B[oo]m-Boxx" and "Love Is" from the album Crazy In Love - #1 Billboard US World Albums
5. 09/10/2021: ITZY - "B[oo]m-Boxx" and "Love Is" from the album Crazy In Love - #1 Billboard US Independent Albums
6. 09/10/2021: ITZY - "B[oo]m-Boxx" and "Love Is" from the album Crazy In Love - #1 Billboard US Tastemaker Albums
7. 09/10/2021: ITZY - "B[oo]m-Boxx" and "Love Is" from the album Crazy In Love - #1 Billboard US Top Album Sales
8. 09/10/2021: ITZY - "B[oo]m-Boxx" and "Love Is" from the album Crazy In Love - #1 Billboard US Top Current Album Sales
9. 26/06/2021: Twice - "Baby Blue Love" from the EP "Taste of Love" - #1 Billboard US World Albums
10. 26/06/2021: Twice - "Baby Blue Love" from the EP "Taste of Love" - #1 Billboard US Top Album Sales
11. 26/06/2021: Twice - "Baby Blue Love" from the EP "Taste of Love" - #1 Billboard US Top Current Album Sales
12. 07/11/2020: Loona - "Fall Again" from the EP "12:00" - #1 Billboard US Heatseekers Albums
13. 21/12/2019: EXO - "Trouble" from the album "Obsession" - #1 Billboard US World Albums
14. 18/03/2019: Twice - "Dance The Night Away" from the album "#Twice2" - #1 Billboard Japan Hot Albums
15. 15/12/2018: Red Velvet - "Sassy Me" from the album "RBB (Really Bad Boy)" - #1 Billboard US Heatseekers Albums
16. 08/12/2018: NCT 127 - "Simon Says" from the album Regular-Irregular - #1 Billboard US World Digital Songs
17. 21/07/2018: Twice - "Dance The Night Away" (single) - #1 Billboard K-POP Hot 100
18. 07/02/2018: EXO - "Love Me Right" from the album "Countdown" - #1 Billboard Japan Top Albums Sales
19. 07/02/2018: EXO - "Love Me Right" from the album "Countdown" - #1 Billboard Japan Hot Albums
20. 03/02/2018: Jonghyun - Poet | Artist - #1 Billboard US World Albums
21. 30/01/2017: Namie Amuro - "Finally" - #1 Billboard Japan Hot Albums
22. 30/01/2017: Namie Amuro - "Finally" - #1 Billboard Japan Top Albums Sales
23. 26/08/2017: Girls' Generation - "Holiday Night" - #1 Billboard US World Albums
24. 25/07/2017: EXO - "The War" - #1 Billboard US World Albums
25. 30/01/2017: E-girls - E.G. Crazy - #1 Billboard Japan Hot Albums
26. 30/01/2017: E-girls - E.G. Crazy - #1 Billboard Japan Top Albums Sales
27. 26/11/2016: B.A.P - "Noir" - #1 Billboard US World Albums
28. 15/10/2016: Ricky Martin - "Vente Pa'Ca feat. Maluma" (single) - #1 Billboard Mexico Airplay
29. 15/10/2016: Ricky Martin - "Vente Pa'Ca feat. Maluma" (single) - #1 Billboard Mexico Espanol Airplay
30. 15/10/2016: Ricky Martin - "Vente Pa'Ca feat. Maluma" (single) - #1 Billboard US Latin Airplay
31. 15/10/2016: Ricky Martin - "Vente Pa'Ca feat. Maluma" (single) - #1 Billboard US Latin Pop Airplay
32. 15/10/2016: Ricky Martin - "Vente Pa'Ca feat. Maluma" (single) - #1 Billboard US Tropical Airplay
33. 11/11/2015: EXO - "Love Me Right" (single) - #1 Billboard Japan Hot 100
34. 05/11/2015: f(x) - "4 Walls" - #1 Billboard US World Albums
35. 26/09/2015: Red Velvet - "The Red" - #1 Billboard US World Albums
36. 05/09/2015: Girls' Generation - "Lion Heart" - #1 Billboard US World Albums
37. 22/08/2015: Nathan Sykes - "Kiss Me Quick" - #1 Billboard US Dance Club Songs
38. 31/01/2015: Jonghyun - "Base" - #1 Billboard US World Albums
39. 04/09/2014: Super Junior - "Mamacita" - #1 Billboard US World Albums
40. 11/08/2014: Girls' Generation - "The Best" - #1 Billboard Japan Top Albums Sales
41. 15/03/2014: Girls' Generation - "Mr. Mr." - #1 Billboard US Heatseekers Albums
42. 17/12/2013: EXO - "Miracles In December" - #1 Billboard US World Albums
43. 17/08/2013: f(x) - "Rum Pum Pum Pum" (single) - #1 Billboard K-Pop Hot 100
44. 17/08/2013: f(x) - "Pink Tape" - #1 Billboard US World Albums
45. 22/06/2013: EXO - "XOXO" - #1 Billboard US World Albums
46. 08/06/2013: Lee Hyori - "Bad Girls" (single) - #1 Billboard K-POP Hot 100
47. 26/01/2013: Girls' Generation - "I Got A Boy" (single) - #1 Billboard K-POP Hot 100
48. 26/01/2013: Super Junior-M - "Break Down" - #1 Billboard US World Albums
49. 19/01/2013: Girls' Generation - "I Got A Boy" (album) - #1 Billboard US World Albums
50. 05/10/2011: TVXQ - Tone - #1 Billboard Japan Top Albums Sales
51. 08/06/2011: Girls' Generation - "Girls' Generation" - #1 Billboard Japan Top Albums Sales

== Awards ==
Year	Award ceremony	Category	Nominee/work	Result	Ref.
2017	Music Publisher Awards in Norway (Musikkforleggerprisen)	Composer / Rightsholder of the Year - Pop Music	Dsign Music	Won	
