= Into the New World =

2007 debut single by Girls' Generation

Single by Girls' Generation

from the album Girls' Generation
- B-side: "Beginning"; "Perfect for You"
- Written: 2002
- Released: August 2, 2007
- Genre: K-pop; dance-pop; teen-pop
- Length: 4:25
- Label: SM
- Composer: Kenzie
- Lyricist: Kim Jeong-bae

Girls' Generation singles chronology
"Into the New World" (2007)	"Girls' Generation" (2007)

Music video
- "Into The New World" on YouTube

"Into the New World" (Korean: 다시 만난 세계; RR: Dasi mannan segye) is the debut single by South Korean girl group Girls' Generation. Originally written in 2002, it was composed by Kenzie while the lyrics were penned by Kim Jeong-bae. It was first released to digital outlets by SM Entertainment on August 2, 2007, while a CD single was made available several days later. The release includes the B-side tracks "Beginning" and "Perfect for You". "Into the New World" was later included on the group's self-titled debut album, which was released on November 1, 2007.

"Into the New World" peaked at number five on the monthly South Korean album chart in August 2007, and eventually sold over 44,000 copies. Although it only saw moderate success upon its initial release, the song has since been recognized by music critics as a symbolic piece embodying unity and an anthem associated with protest culture in South Korea. Melon and Rolling Stone named it amongst the best K-pop songs of all time.

After its release, Girls' Generation performed "Into the New World" on various domestic music programs. It won Rookie of the Month for August at the Cyworld Digital Music Awards and won a first place trophy on M Countdown on October 11, 2007. Girls' Generation included the song in the set lists for all of their concert tours in Asia; during their Phantasia Tour (2015–2016), the group performed a ballad rendition of "Into the New World".

== Background and release ==
In 2002, the song was considered as a candidate for M.I.L.K.'s second album. Due to the group's breakup in 2003, the song was shelved until Girls' Generation's debut. "Into the New World" was officially released as part of a single album on August 3, 2007. The song was originally first performed by the group in SBS's Inkigayo on August 5, 2007. "Into the New World" reached number one on Mnet's M Countdown on October 11, 2007.

== Commercial performance ==
Upon its initial release, "Into the New World" experienced only moderate levels of success in South Korea. The physical edition of "Into the New World" debuted at number 5 on the monthly album chart for August 2007 compiled by the Music Industry Association of Korea (MIAK), selling 10,823 copies in its first month of release. It was the 41st best-selling CD release of 2007 in South Korea, selling 22,818 physical copies in total. In 2010, the single peaked at number 2 on the Gaon Album Chart for the chart issue dated April 18–24, based on physical sales. It ranked at number 9 on the Gaon monthly chart issue for April 2010.

== Music video ==
The music video was filmed from July 21 to 23, 2007, at Paju Book City, Provence Village, Yeoju Promotion Flight School, and Yangjae-dong. The music video was directed by Cheon Hyuk-jin and shows the group members doing various activities. Yoona is designing clothes for a boutique, Taeyeon is flying a light aircraft with Sooyoung accompanying her. In the video, the aircraft Taeyeon flies is broken, and she attempts to repair it, with Sooyoung praying. The aircraft is successfully repaired and both of them are happy. In the last scene of the video, Sooyoung is seen chasing after Taeyeon as she flies away in the aircraft.

Yuri is a barista in the music video and is seen making a latte. Hyoyeon is purchasing a pair of white training shoes at a department store, after which she dances on a stairway. Sunny and Jessica are seen spray painting the words "New World 2007". Tiffany is repairing a scooter (specifically, a Yamaha Fino 115) and repaints its body with pink color with flower motif and customizes its license plate. The customized license plate says "Tiffany" with the hanja version of "Girls' Generation" above it. It is actually owned by Shindong of Super Junior. Seohyun is doing ballet while holding a paper plane, on the rooftop of a building.

There are two dance sets featured in the video. The first one is a room with a white background, and the second one is a lobby of a shopping mall. The music video on SM Town's YouTube channel, originally uploaded on June 3, 2011, was remastered in high definition and in 4K and was re-released on January 21, 2022, as part of SM's Remastering Project.

== In popular culture ==
This song is often covered in survival shows, special stages of music charts and award shows. In the first season of Produce 101, it was used as one of the debut song missions, it was also used for the first evaluation in Finding Momoland. Big Mama's Lee Young-Hyun performed a reinterpretation of the song on Immortal Songs - King of Kings annual special feature. At the 2016 KBS Song Festival, GFriend, I.O.I, Twice and Red Velvet covered the song. In Idol School in 2017, it was used as a preliminary vocal assessment. The nine winners from the show, Fromis 9, performed the song again for M! Countdown's 600th episode.

After member Jessica left Girls' Generation, the song was also changed into a ballad version for live concert performances. Hyoyeon also admitted on Secret Unnies that the choreography was prepared as far back as a year before Girls' Generation official debut. The ballad version of the song was used as a diagnostics tool in Produce 48. In that cover, Kim Chaewon and Nako Yabuki went on to become members of Iz*One.

== Legacy ==
In a panel of 35 music critics and professionals organized by newspaper Seoul Shinmun and online portal Melon, "Into the New World" was ranked the 6th best K-pop song of all time; music critic Squib said that it has continuously attracted the attention of the public and has become a "symbol of the times". The Korea Herald also highlighted the song's use in expressing solidarity for a cause, noting that the song's lyrics about unity resonated with Korean millennials. Naming it one of the best K-pop debut songs of all time, Insider wrote "in the 15 years since its release, has become a standard for Korean girl groups".

=== Use as a protest song ===
The song experienced a resurgence in 2016 when Ewha Womans University students sang it during part of their peaceful protest against the university whilst facing 1600 police officers. Girls' Generation member Tiffany responded that

"As Girls' Generation, it was a proud moment. Right now is the generation for feminists, and it's an era where messages of women empowering other women are important. I feel like our song played that role, so my heart was happy."

Fellow member Yuri also expressed similar sentiments:

"I saw the video several times, and I even cried because my heart was overcome with emotion. It was a moment when I felt a huge sense of pride as a singer. It was a message that I wanted to deliver through my work, and the inspiration that we wanted to deliver through music and performance was being realized, so it was unlike anything else. At the time when we debuted, I didn't fully understand the lyrics so I might have been imitating it with bright eyes. But as time passes and I listen to the song, the lyrics touch me even more."

During the 2016–2017 South Korean protests, the song, along with Big Bang's "Bang Bang Bang" (2015) and Twice's "Cheer Up" (2016), was sung widely in public squares, leading to it becoming the "morning dew" of the young generation and led to it placing number one on Melon's real-time charts almost ten years after its release. It was also sung in celebration when judges of the Constitutional Court of Korea ruled against the criminalization of abortion in South Korea on April 11, 2019. In 2020, it was used during an anti-government rally as part of the 2020 Thai protests. Some protesters were already aware of the song's usage during protests in Korea. K-pop fans helped translate and memorize meaningful lyrics for protesters to sing along. In 2024, when a protest was held for the impeachment of South Korean president Yoon Suk-yeol after the president's failed bid to enact martial law, protestors at the Seoul National University sang the song Into The New World while calling for Yoon to step down. It was sung again by the protesters a week later, when Yoon was impeached by the National Assembly.

"Into the New World" on critic rankings
Publication	Year	List	Rank	Ref.
The Dong-a Ilbo	2016	Best Female Idol Songs in the Past 20 Years	4	
Insider	2022	13 Best K-pop Debuts of All Time	No order	
Melon	2021	Top 100 K-pop Songs of All Time	6	
Music Y	2014	120 Greatest Dance Songs of All Time	62	
Rolling Stone	2023	100 Greatest Songs in the History of Korean Pop Music	33	

== Accolades ==
Awards
Year	Organization	Category	Result	Ref.
2007	Cyworld Digital Music Awards	Rookie of the Month (August)	Won	

Music program awards
Program	Date	Ref.
M Countdown	October 11, 2007	

== Track listing ==
CD single / Digital EP
No.	Title	Lyrics	Music	Arrangement	Length
1.	"Into the New World" (다시 만난 세계; Dasi Mannan Segye)	Kim Jeong-bae	Kenzie	Kenzie	04:25
2.	"Beginning"	Yoon Hyo-sang	Anna-Lena Margaretha Hogdahl; Mattias Lindblom; Anders Wollbeck	Hwang Seong-je	03:03
3.	"Perfect for You" (소원; Sowon)	Kwon Yun-jeong	Ingrid Skretting	Kenzie	03:14
4.	"Into the New World" (Instrumental)		Kenzie	Kenzie	04:25
Total length:					15:07

Digital single – Remix version
No.	Title	Lyrics	Music	Arrangement	Length
1.	"Into the New World" (Remix)	Kim Jeong-bae	Kenzie	Kenzie	04:30

== Credits and personnel ==
Credits adapted from album's liner notes.

Studio

- SM Blue Ocean Studio – recording
- SM Yellow Tail Studio – recording
- SM Concert Hall Studio – recording, mixing
- Sonic Korea – mastering

Personnel

- SM Entertainment – executive producer
- Lee Soo-man – producer
- Girls' Generation – vocals, background vocals
- Kim Jeong-bae – lyrics, guitar
- Kenzie – composition, arrangement, vocal directing
- Heo Jeong-hee a.k.a. KAT – recording
- Lee Seong-ho – recording
- Nam Koong-jin – recording, mixing
- Jeon Hoon – mastering

== Chart performance ==
=== Weekly charts ===
2010 chart performance for "Into the New World"
Chart (2010)	Peak position
South Korean Albums (Gaon)	2

2024 chart performance for "Into the New World"
Chart (2024)	Peak position
South Korea (Circle)	176

=== Monthly charts ===
Chart (2007)	Peak position
South Korean Albums (MIAK)	5

=== Sales ===
Country	Sales
South Korea (physical)	44,754

== Release history ==
Region	Release date	Format	Label
Worldwide	August 2, 2007	Digital EP	SM Entertainment
South Korea	August 3, 2007	CD single	SM Entertainment
Worldwide	September 10, 2007	Digital single – Remix	SM Entertainment
