= Martin Hoberg Hedegaard =

Danish musician (born 1992)

Saveus
- Also known as: Saveus
- Born: Martin Hoberg Hedegaard; 9 October 1992 (age 34)
- Origin: Ørum, Denmark
- Genres: Pop; Rock; Electronic; Soul
- Occupations: Singer; songwriter; record producer
- Instruments: Vocals; guitar; piano
- Years active: 2008–present
- Label: Copenhagen

Martin Hoberg Hedegaard (born 9 October 1992), also known as Saveus, is a Danish singer, songwriter and record producer. In 2016, he wrote and produced the EP Will Somebody Save Us and in 2018 he released his first full-length album, Neuro. The same year, he opened the Orange Stage at the Roskilde Festival.

== History ==
=== Childhood ===
Martin was born in Ørum in central Jutland, Denmark. He lived there his entire life with his mother Gitta, his father Peder, and his two older brothers Anders and Simon.

=== The X Factor 2008 ===
Martin first rose to fame in 2008 as the winner of the first Danish series of The X Factor, taking the title at the age of 15. Later, during the live shows, Martin performed songs such as "Kiss From a Rose" by Seal, "Rock With You" by Michael Jackson, and "Somebody to Love" by Queen. Internationally, he has been praised by X Factor creator Simon Cowell and Queen themselves. In the finale of the show, Martin beat 23-year-old contestant Laura Arensbak Kjærgaard, with whom he had formed a strong friendship.

=== Performances during X Factor ===
Episode	Theme	Song	Artist	Result
Audition	Free Choice	"You Are Not Alone"	Michael Jackson	Through to Bootcamp (Day 1)
Bootcamp (Day 1)	Free Choice			Through to Bootcamp (Day 2)
Bootcamp (Day 2)	Free Choice	"Your Song"	Elton John	Through to Live Shows
Live show 1	Hits from Tjeklisten	"As"	Stevie Wonder	Safe
Live show 2	FilmHits	"Kiss from a Rose"	Seal	Safe
Live show 3	Disco	"Rock with You"	Michael Jackson	Safe
Live show 4	Sing Danish	"Kom tilbage nu"	Danseorkestret	Safe
Live show 5	BigBand	"Somebody to Love"	Queen	Safe
Live show 6 (Quarter-Final)	Anne Linnet	"Smuk og Dejlig"	Anne Linnet	Safe
Live show 6 (Quarter-Final)	Elvis Presley	"Can't Help Falling in Love"	Elvis Presley	Safe
Live show 7 (Semi-Final)	James Blunt	"Goodbye My Lover"	James Blunt	Safe
Live show 7 (Semi-Final)	Free Choice	"What Goes Around... Comes Around"	Justin Timberlake	Safe
Live show 8 (Final)	Viewer's Choice	"Somebody to Love"	Queen	Winner
Live show 8 (Final)	Free Choice	"For Once in My Life"	Stevie Wonder	Winner
Live show 8 (Final)	Winner's Single	"The 1"	Martin	Winner

=== 2009–2014: Songwriting ===
After the release of his album Show The World, Martin focused on his career as a songwriter and producer. He went on to write numerous K-pop singles including "Black Suit" by Super Junior, "Galaxy Supernova" by Girls' Generation, "El Dorado" by Exo, and "뒷모습 (Steppin')" by TVXQ.

His first and only album as Martin "Show The World" sold 100,000 copies.

=== 2015–present: Saveus ===
During his time as a songwriter, Martin also worked on his own material. In 2015, he debuted at the Danish "P3 Guld" award-show with a live performance of his first single "Levitate Me". It charted at number 1 on iTunes and was picked as "Song of The Week" by P3. In November 2015, he supported the British pop band Years & Years on their European tour In 2016 he released the EP "Will Somebody Save Us" and went on his first tour around Denmark, selling out numerous shows in Copenhagen. During 2017 Saveus single "Watch The World" was picked up by Elton John on his radio show Rocket Hour.

In 2018, he released his debut album Neuro with the singles "Ready to Die" and "Time Can Heal a Man", with both singles gaining radio-airplay. The same year he opened the Orange Stage at Roskilde Festival with an audience of more than 60,000 people, which was praised by critics.

== Discography ==
=== Albums ===
Title	Details	Peak chart positions	Certifications
Title	Details	DEN	Certifications
Show the World	Released: 31 May 2008; Label: Sony BMG; Format: CD	1	IFPI DEN: 3× Platinum
Neuro	Released: 25 May 2018; Label: Copenhagen, Universal; Format: CD	5	IFPI DEN: Platinum
Rainman	Released: 2 September 2022; Label: Copenhagen, Universal; Format: CD, digital	5	IFPI DEN: Gold
Loveflow	Released: 7 November 2025; Label: The Bank; Format: CD, digital	11	

Preceded by None	X Factor (Denmark); Winner; 2008	Succeeded by Linda Andrews
