= Girls & Peace World Tour =

2013–14 concert tour by Girls' Generation

- World tour by Girls' Generation
- Promotional image for Girls' Generation World Tour Girls & Peace
- Location: Asia
- Associated album: Girls & Peace; I Got A Boy
- Start date: June 8, 2013
- End date: February 15, 2014
- No. of shows: 10

Girls' Generation concert chronology
- Girls & Peace Japan 2nd Tour (2013); Girls & Peace World Tour (2013–14); Love & Peace Japan 3rd Tour (2014)

Girls & Peace World Tour is the third concert tour by South Korean girl group Girls' Generation. The tour was officially announced in April 2013 after the last 2 days of "2nd Japan Tour" with two dates in South Korea and plans for future dates across the globe. Although initially announced as a "world" tour, the group only visited seven cities in six countries across East Asia and Southeast Asia. They released a DVD of Seoul concert, 'Girls' Generation - World Tour: Girls & Peace in Seoul' on March 30, 2015.

== History ==
The tour was officially announced by their company SM Entertainment on April 26, 2013, with two dates in Seoul at the Olympic Park. The South Korean dates are the first time the group has performed solo in South Korea in two years following their concerts on the 2011 Girls' Generation Tour in July 2011. Tickets for the Seoul concert were sold through G-Market on May 9. Plans for a fan tour and tickets to the Seoul concerts exclusively for overseas fans were announced at the same time through SM Entertainment's Culture & Content website.

On June 5, concerts in Taiwan were announced through the Taipei Arena website, for July 20 and 21, 2013. At the tour press conference on June 8, it was announced the girls would be heading to the United States and South America following the group's concert in Taipei in July, however, this never came to fruition. On June 22, 2013, the group announced at the 2013 Asia Style Collection held in Singapore that they would return to the city in October on the tour. On August 2, 2013, Dyandra Entertainment, a promoter in Indonesia announced the Indonesian concert through their Twitter account. The Indonesian concert was held on September 14 at the Mata Elang International Stadium and was the group's first solo concert in Indonesia. On August 15, it was announced that the concert in Singapore will be held on October 12, 2013. All 8,000 tickets were sold out within a day.

On November 1, 2013, SM True Facebook official fanpage, a promoter of SM Entertainment in Thailand announced that the concert in Thailand will be held on January 11, 2014, at Impact, Muang Thong Thani. Tickets were sold out in 10 minutes. On February 15, 2014, during the group's first concert in Macau, Taeyeon announced that the show would be the last stop of the tour but that their next world tour would be starting soon. Sooyoung then added that following their third Japan arena tour which would be starting soon, a new tour would commence to promote their new mini album Mr.Mr.

== Set list ==
Seoul, South Korea (June 8/9, 2013)

Main Set
Act 1

1. "Hoot"
2. "Animal"
3. "Talk Talk"
4. "The Boys"
5. "I Got a Boy"
6. "Say Yes"
7. "Dancing Queen"

Act 2

1. "Mr. Taxi" (Korean version)
2. "T.O.P."
3. "Flower Power"

Act 3

1. "Paparazzi"
2. "Run Devil Run"
3. "Reflection"

Act 4

1. "Promise"
2. "Baby Baby" (Ballad version)

Act 5

1. "I'm A Diamond"
2. "Express 999"
3. "Tell Me Your Wish (Genie)"
4. "The Great Escape" (Brian Lee remix) / Can't Take My Eyes Off You"

Act 6

1. "My J"
2. "Kissing You" / "Way to Go"
3. "Gee"
4. "Forever"

Encore

1. "Into the New World"
2. "Love & Girls"
3. "Oh!"
4. "How Great Is Your Love"
5. "Twinkle" (All members version)

Double Encore (Limited Concert Only)^{1}

1. "Gee"
^{1} Double encore was only performed at the concert on June 9
Taipei, Taiwan (July 20/21, 2013)

Main Set
Act 1

1. "Hoot"
2. "Animal"
3. "Talk Talk"
4. "The Boys"
5. "I Got a Boy"
6. "Say Yes"
7. "Dancing Queen"

Act 2

1. "Mr. Taxi" (Korean version)
2. "T.O.P."
3. "Flower Power"

Act 3

1. "Paparazzi"
2. "Run Devil Run"
3. "Reflection"

Act 4

1. "Promise"
2. "Baby Baby" (Ballad version)

Act 5

1. "I'm A Diamond"
2. "Express 999"
3. "Tell Me Your Wish (Genie)"
4. "The Great Escape" (Brian Lee remix) / Can't Take My Eyes Off You"

Act 6

1. "My J"
2. "Kissing You" / "Way to Go"
3. "Gee"
4. "Forever"

Encore

1. "Into the New World"
2. "Love & Girls"
3. "Oh!"
4. "How Great Is Your Love"
5. "Twinkle" (All members version)
Jakarta, Indonesia (September 14, 2013)

Main Set
Act 1

1. "Hoot"
2. "Animal"
3. "The Boys"
4. "I Got a Boy"
5. "Say Yes"
6. "Dancing Queen"

Act 2

1. "Mr. Taxi" (Korean version)
2. "T.O.P."
3. "Flower Power"

Act 3

1. "Paparazzi"
2. "Run Devil Run"
3. "Reflection"

Act 4

1. "Promise"
2. "Baby Baby" (Ballad version)

Act 5

1. "I'm A Diamond"
2. "Express 999"
3. "Tell Me Your Wish (Genie)"
4. "The Great Escape" (Brian Lee remix) / Can't Take My Eyes Off You"

Act 6

1. "My J"
2. "Kissing You" / "Way to Go"
3. "Gee"
4. "Forever"

Encore

1. "Into the New World"
2. "Oh!"
3. "Twinkle" (All members version)
Singapore (October 12, 2013)

Main Set
Act 1

1. "Hoot"
2. "Animal"
3. "The Boys"
4. "I Got a Boy"
5. "Say Yes"
6. "Dancing Queen"

Act 2

1. "Mr. Taxi" (Korean version)
2. "T.O.P."
3. "Flower Power"

Act 3

1. "Paparazzi"
2. "Run Devil Run"
3. "Reflection"

Act 4

1. "Promise"
2. "Baby Baby" (Ballad version)

Act 5

1. "I'm A Diamond"
2. "Express 999"
3. "Tell Me Your Wish (Genie)"
4. "The Great Escape" (Brian Lee remix) / Can't Take My Eyes Off You"

Act 6

1. "My J"
2. "Kissing You" / "Way to Go"
3. "Gee"
4. "Forever"

Encore

1. "Into the New World"
2. "Oh!"
3. "Twinkle" (All members version)
Hong Kong (November 9/10, 2013)

Opening Act

1. "Specatacular" / "Mamama" - Tasty
2. "You Know Me" - Tasty

Main Set
Act 1

1. "Hoot"
2. "Animal"
3. "The Boys"
4. "I Got a Boy"
5. "Say Yes"
6. "Dancing Queen"

Act 2

1. "Mr. Taxi" (Korean version)
2. "T.O.P."
3. "Flower Power"

Act 3

1. "Paparazzi"
2. "Run Devil Run"
3. "Reflection"

Act 4

1. "Promise"
2. "Baby Baby" (Ballad version)

Act 5

1. "I'm A Diamond"
2. "Express 999"
3. "Tell Me Your Wish (Genie)"
4. "The Great Escape" (Brian Lee remix) / Can't Take My Eyes Off You"

Act 6

1. "My J"
2. "Kissing You" / "Way to Go"
3. "Gee"
4. "Forever"

Encore

1. "Into the New World"
2. "Oh!"
3. "Twinkle" (All members version)
Bangkok, Thailand (January 11, 2014)

Main Set
Act 1

1. "Hoot"
2. "Animal"
3. "The Boys"
4. "I Got a Boy"
5. "Say Yes"
6. "Dancing Queen"

Act 2

1. "Mr. Taxi" (Korean version)
2. "T.O.P."
3. "Flower Power"

Act 3

1. "Paparazzi"
2. "Run Devil Run"
3. "Reflection"

Act 4

1. "Promise"
2. "Baby Baby" (Ballad version)

Act 5

1. "I'm A Diamond"
2. "Express 999"
3. "Tell Me Your Wish (Genie)"
4. "The Great Escape" (Brian Lee remix) / Can't Take My Eyes Off You"

Act 6

1. "My J"
2. "Kissing You" / "Way to Go"
3. "Gee"
4. "Forever"

Encore

1. "Into the New World"
2. "Oh!"
3. "Twinkle" (All members version)
Macau (February 15, 2014)

Opening Act

1. "Day n' Night" - Tasty
2. "You Know Me" - Tasty

Main Set
Act 1

1. "Hoot"
2. "Animal"
3. "The Boys"
4. "I Got a Boy"
5. "Say Yes"
6. "Dancing Queen"

Act 2

1. "Mr. Taxi" (Korean version)
2. "T.O.P."
3. "Flower Power"

Act 3

1. "Paparazzi"
2. "Run Devil Run"
3. "Reflection"

Act 4

1. "Promise"
2. "Baby Baby" (Ballad version)

Act 5

1. "I'm A Diamond"
2. "Express 999"
3. "Tell Me Your Wish (Genie)"
4. "The Great Escape" (Brian Lee remix) / Can't Take My Eyes Off You"

Act 6

1. "My J"
2. "Kissing You" / "Way to Go"
3. "Gee"
4. "Forever"

Encore

1. "Into the New World"
2. "Oh!"
3. "Twinkle" (All members version)

== Tour dates ==
List of concert dates
Date	City	Country	Venue	Attendance	Revenue
June 8, 2013	Seoul	South Korea	Olympic Gymnastics Arena	20,000	$1,700,000
June 9, 2013	Seoul	South Korea	Olympic Gymnastics Arena	20,000	$1,700,000
July 20, 2013	Taipei	Taiwan	Taipei Arena	22,000	$3,060,000
July 21, 2013	Taipei	Taiwan	Taipei Arena	22,000	$3,060,000
September 14, 2013	Jakarta	Indonesia	Mata Elang International Stadium	12,000	—
October 12, 2013	Singapore		Singapore Indoor Stadium	8,000	—
November 9, 2013	Hong Kong	China	AsiaWorld–Arena	22,000	—
November 10, 2013	Hong Kong	China	AsiaWorld–Arena	22,000	—
January 11, 2014	Bangkok	Thailand	Impact Arena	12,000	—
February 15, 2014	Macau	China	Cotai Arena	—	—
Total				96,000	N/A

== Personnel ==
- Artist: Taeyeon, Jessica, Sunny, Tiffany, Hyoyeon, Yuri, Sooyoung, Yoona, Seohyun
- Tour organizer: SM Entertainment
- Tour promoter: Dream Maker Entercom (South Korea), Super Dome (Taiwan), Dyandra Entertainment & 7Kings Entertainment (Indonesia), Running Into The Sun (Singapore), Media Asia Entertainment Limited & East Asia Entertainment Limited (China), SM True (Thailand)
- Tour guest performers : Tasty (Hong Kong, Macau)

== Gallery ==
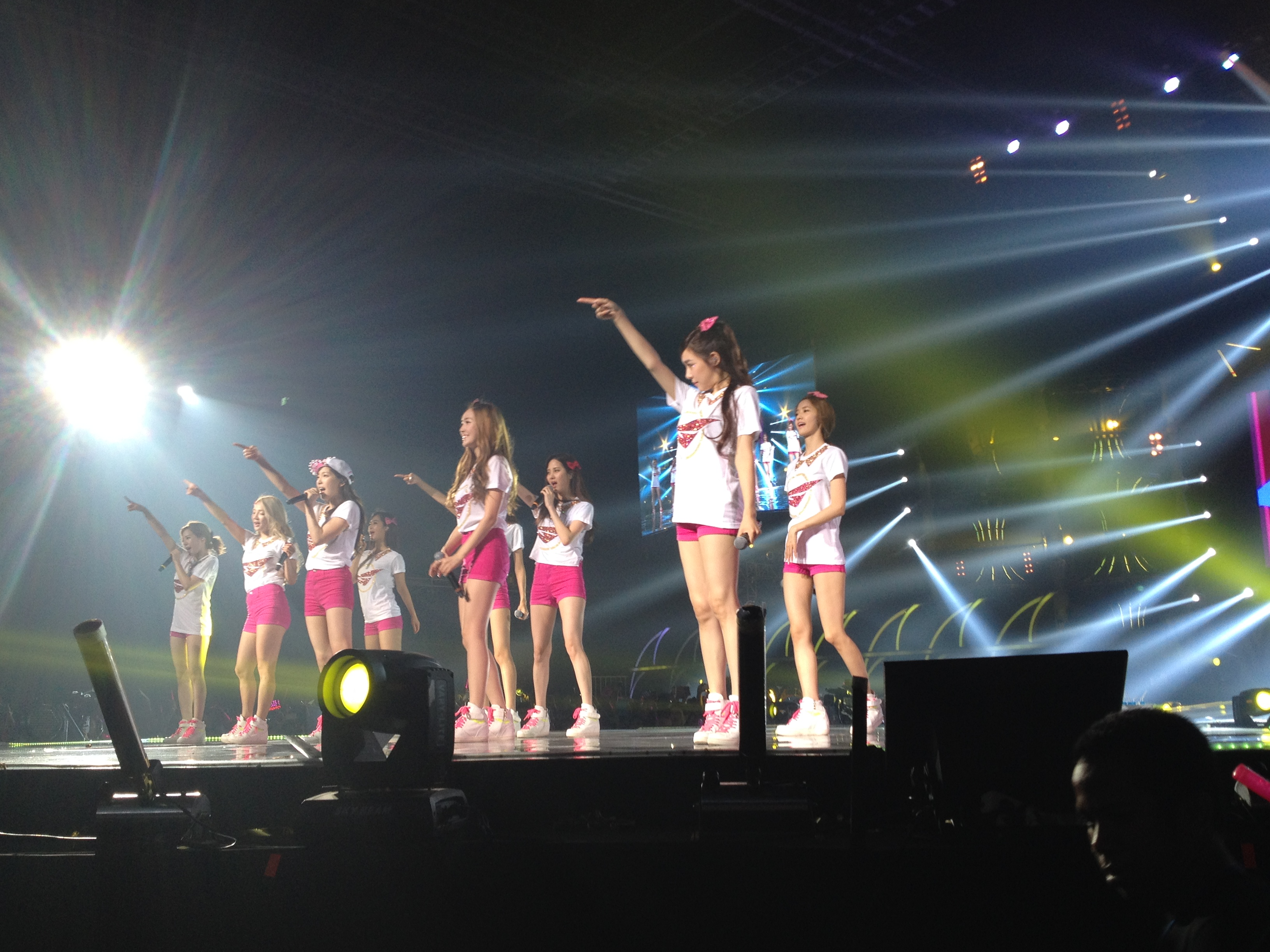
Girls' Generation performing in Jakarta for Girls & Peace World Tour
