= Girls & Peace Japan 2nd Tour =

2013 concert tour by Girls' Generation

- Japan tour by Girls' Generation
- Location: Japan
- Associated album: Girls & Peace
- Start date: February 9, 2013
- End date: April 21, 2013
- No. of shows: 20
- Attendance: 200,000

Girls' Generation concert chronology
- Girls' Generation Tour (2011–12); Girls & Peace Japan 2nd Tour (2013); Girls & Peace World Tour (2013–14)

Girls' Generation -Girls & Peace- Japan 2nd Tour was the second Japanese concert tour by South Korean girl group Girls' Generation to promote their second Japanese album, Girls & Peace.

== History ==
It was announced on August 31, 2012, that Girls' Generation will embark on their second nationwide Japan tour starting in February 2013, with an initial total of 20 stops in support of their second Japanese studio album, Girls & Peace. On the same day, it was revealed that the fans could start applying for tickets on September 5, 2012. The tour will cover Nagoya, Osaka, Fukuoka, Saitama, Niigata, Hiroshima & Kobe.

According to an announcement made by their agency, SM Entertainment, Girls' Generation wrapped up their second arena tour successfully in Japan, where the group started the tour on February 9. Girls' Generation II -Girls&Peace- Japan 2nd Tour was performed 20 times in 7 different cities, including Kobe, Saitama, and Niigata. They finished the last performances on April 20 and 21 at the Central Arena in Osaka, performing 27 songs including "Genie", "Gee", "Girls&Peace", "Flower Power", "I Got a Boy", and "Dancing Queen".

== Ticketing and commercial performance ==
Tickets for the Girls & Peace Japan 2nd Tour were ¥9,500 and included penlights. The tour attracted over 200,000 people in total, making it the largest tour among Korean girl groups in Japan.

== Live broadcasts ==
Japanese broadcaster Wowow filmed the group's April 4 and 5, 2013, shows at the Saitama Super Arena. The show aired on Wowow's music channel on June 16. A television special entitled "Girls' Generation Arena Tour Special~Before Broadcast~", aired prior to the concert on June 1, 2013.

== Set list ==
Main set

1. "Flower Power"
2. "Animal"
3. "Boomerang"
4. "The Boys" (Japanese version)
5. "I Got a Boy"
6. "Say Yes"
7. "Dancing Queen"
8. "Mr. Taxi" (remix) (Japanese version)
9. "T.O.P."
10. "Bad Girl"
11. "Paparazzi"
12. "Run Devil Run" (Japanese version)
13. "Reflection"
14. "Time Machine"
15. "All My Love Is for You"
16. "I'm A Diamond"
17. "Express 999"
18. "Genie" (Japanese version)
19. "The Great Escape" (Brian Lee remix) / "Can't Take My Eyes Off You"
20. "My J"
21. "Kissing You" / "Way to Go"
22. "Gee" (Japanese version)
23. "Not Alone"

Encore

1. "Beep Beep"
2. "Oh!" (Japanese version)
3. "Stay Girls"
4. "Girls & Peace"

Double Encore

1. "Gee" (Japanese version)^{1}

^{1} Double encore was only performed at Osaka, April 21, 2013, as the last concert of the tour.

== Tour dates ==
List of concert dates
Date	City	Venue	Attendance
February 9, 2013	Kobe	World Memorial Hall	200,000
February 10, 2013	Kobe	World Memorial Hall	200,000
February 16, 2013	Saitama	Saitama Super Arena	200,000
February 17, 2013	Saitama	Saitama Super Arena	200,000
February 23, 2013	Niigata	Toki Messe	200,000
February 24, 2013	Niigata	Toki Messe	200,000
February 27, 2013	Fukuoka	Marine Messe Fukuoka	200,000
February 28, 2013	Fukuoka	Marine Messe Fukuoka	200,000
March 9, 2013	Hiroshima	Hiroshima Green Arena	200,000
March 10, 2013	Hiroshima	Hiroshima Green Arena	200,000
March 19, 2013	Saitama	Saitama Super Arena	200,000
March 20, 2013	Saitama	Saitama Super Arena	200,000
March 26, 2013	Osaka	Osaka-jō Hall	200,000
March 27, 2013	Osaka	Osaka-jō Hall	200,000
April 4, 2013	Saitama	Saitama Super Arena	200,000
April 5, 2013	Saitama	Saitama Super Arena	200,000
April 9, 2013	Nagoya	Nippon Gaishi Hall	200,000
April 10, 2013	Nagoya	Nippon Gaishi Hall	200,000
April 20, 2013	Osaka	Osaka Municipal Central Gymnasium	200,000
April 21, 2013	Osaka	Osaka Municipal Central Gymnasium	200,000
Total			200,000

== DVD ==
Girls & Peace: 2nd Japan Tour is the eighth DVD and Blu-ray release from South Korean girl group Girls' Generation. It was released on September 18, 2013, in Japan. The DVD and Blu-ray features their second nationwide tour, visiting eight venues for a total of 20 shows. There will be four different versions: a DVD and Blu-ray version, both with a regular and limited edition. The limited editions will come with special footage content, a 44-page photobook pamphlet, special T-shirt, dance versions of several music videos and a tour documentary.

=== Track list ===
1. Flower Power
2. Animal
3. Boomerang
4. The Boys
5. I Got a Boy
6. Say Yes
7. Dancing Queen
8. Mr.Taxi
9. T.O.P
10. Bad Girl
11. Paparazzi
12. Run Devil Run
13. Reflection
14. Time Machine
15. All My Love Is for You
16. I'm a Diamond
17. Express 999
18. Genie
19. The Great Escape + Can't Take My Eyes off You
20. My J
21. Kissing You + Way to Go
22. Gee
23. Not Alone
24. Beep Beep
25. Oh!
26. Stay Girls
27. Girls & Peace

Limited Edition DVD

1. Boomerang Dance ver.
2. Reflection Dance ver.
3. I'm a Diamond Dance ver.
4. Tour Document Movie

=== Chart performance ===
According to Tower Record's pre-order charts, the limited edition Blu-ray ranked second and the limited edition DVD ranked third. Girls' Generation's Girls & Peace: 2nd Japan Tour which was released on September 18 took the no.1 spot on Oricon Daily DVD and it also ranked 3rd on Oricon Daily Blu-ray Chart. The DVD managed to rank 2nd at Oricon Daily DVD Music Chart. One week after the release, the DVD sold 32,000 copies while the Blu-ray sold 21,000 copies. The DVD debuted at rank number 1 on the Oricon Weekly DVD Chart.

=== Charts ===
Chart	Peak position
Japanese DVD Chart (Oricon)	1

=== Release history ===
Country	Date	Format	Label
Japan	September 18, 2013	DVD, Blu-ray Disc	Nayutawave Records
