= Rino Nakasone =

Japanese dancer and actor (born 1979)

- 仲宗根 梨乃
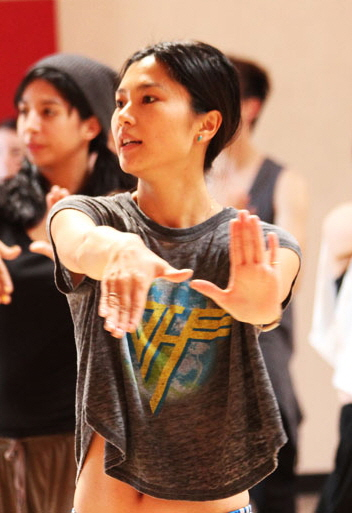
- Rino Nakasone teaching the choreography for "Mr. Taxi" at a dance class in Los Angeles in October 2012
- Born: June 11, 1979 (age 47); Naha, Okinawa, Japan
- Other names: Rino Nakasone-Razalan; Music
- Occupations: Dancer; choreographer; singer
- Spouse: LeeJ Razalan (m. 2007–2012)
- Musical career
- Website: rinonakasone.com

Rino Nakasone (仲宗根 梨乃, Nakasone Rino; born June 11, 1979) is a Japanese dancer, choreographer, artistic director and actor. Nakasone and her dance crew, Beat Freaks, participated in the third season of America's Best Dance Crew, where they finished in second place. Nakasone has worked as a choreographer in South Korea and Japan, working with groups such as Shinee, Girls' Generation, TVXQ, f(x), Red Velvet, and SMAP.

== Early life and career ==
Rino Nakasone was born in Naha, capital of Okinawa Prefecture on June 11, 1979. She became interested in dance after watching music videos by Michael Jackson and Janet Jackson and mimicking their moves. At the age of nineteen, she went to Los Angeles to study dance. Just after her visa expired, she got a job as a backup dancer for Janet Jackson.

In 2004, she was chosen by Britney Spears as a backup dancer for Spears' Onyx Hotel Tour. After touring with Spears, she toured with Gwen Stefani as "Music", one of the Harajuku Girls, earning praise for her dance performance. She also danced for other musicians, such as Justin Bieber, and taught dance at performing arts centers. She joined an all-female dance group, Beat Freaks, which competed and was runner-up in America's Best Dance Crew in 2009.

Nakasone started her career as a choreographer in 2008 with South Korean boy band Shinee's debut song, "Replay". In 2009, she worked with SM Entertainment's dance team to create the choreography for Girls' Generation's "Genie". She has choreographed for other SM Entertainment artists, including Super Junior and BoA, as well as Japanese groups AKB48 and SMAP. She has directed concerts for BoA, Girls' Generation, Shinee, Taemin, SuperM and NCT 127.

In 2010, she appeared in the dance multimedia production "Siren Assassins" as Queen Jade. That same year, she joined The Pussycat Dolls after four of the original members left the group. She performed in two musicals in 2015, The Wiz and Asterisk, both in Japan.

== List of choreographies ==
=== Shinee ===
- "Replay"
- "Love Like Oxygen"
- "Juliette"
- "Lucifer" (with Shim Jae-won)
- "Hello"
- "Your Number"
- "Kimi no Sei De"
- "Get the Treasure" (with 50)

=== Girls' Generation ===
- "Genie" (with Shim Jae-won)
- "Oh!"
- "Hoot"
- "Mr. Taxi" (with Shim Jae-won)
- "The Boys"
- "Paparazzi"
- "I Got a Boy" (with NappyTabs and Jillian Meyers)
- "Beep Beep"
- "Love & Girls"
- "Boomerang"
- "Galaxy Supernova" (with Kevin Maher and Shim Jae-won)
- "Bump It"
- "Sign"
- "All Night" (with Fuko and Shuhei Meguri)

=== Super Junior ===
- "No Other" (with Maryss from Paris)

=== BoA ===
- "Dangerous"
- "Copy & Paste"
- "Shout it Out"

=== Kangta ===
- "Love Frequency" (with Maryss From Paris)

=== f(x) ===
- "Chu" (with Hwang Sang-hoon)
- "Nu ABO" (with Maryss from Paris)
- "Gangsta Boy"
- "Hot Summer"

=== TVXQ ===
- "Maximum"
- "Keep Your Head Down" (with Shim Jae-won)
- "Android" (with Shim Jae-won)

=== Red Velvet ===
- "Rookie" (with Ryu So-hee)
- "#Cookie Jar" (with Fuko Takenaka)

=== NCT 127 ===
- "Chain" (with Jumi Lite)

=== AKB48 ===
- "Gingham Check"
- "Heart Ereki"
- "Bokutachi wa Tatakawanai"

== Personal life ==
Rino Nakasone married LeeJ Razalan, the manager of Beat Freaks and a fellow dancer, in 2007. On May 6, 2012, Rino announced that she and LeeJ had decided to go separate ways and would take their five years of marriage as a "special learning experience" while continuing to remain friends.

== Awards ==
=== Huading Awards ===
Year	Nominee / work	Award	Result
2015	Rino Nakasone-Razalan	Global Best Dancer-Actor	Won

== Bibliography ==
- ART BOOK「Rinosophy」2023
