= The Boys (Girls' Generation album) =

- Korean Version cover

Studio album by Girls' Generation
- Released: October 19, 2011
- Recorded: 2011
- Genres: Dance-pop; electropop
- Length: 46:02
- Languages: Korean; English
- Labels: SM; Interscope; Polydor; Dreamus

Girls' Generation chronology
Girls' Generation (2011)	The Boys (2011)	Girls & Peace (2012)

Mr. Taxi version

Singles from The Boys
- 1. "The Boys" Released: October 19, 2011; 2. "Mr. Taxi" Released: December 9, 2011

The Boys is the third Korean studio album and the fourth overall by South Korean girl group Girls' Generation. The record saw the contribution of the group's previous collaborator Hitchhiker, who produced the tracks "Telepathy" and "Sunflower". The title track, "The Boys", was a result of experimenting with new producers, including American Grammy Award-winning producer Teddy Riley. Musically, The Boys mostly contains uptempo dance tracks and occasionally empowerment ballads.

The album was released on October 19, 2011, by SM Entertainment, and was distributed in South Korea by KMP Holdings. An alternate version titled Mr. Taxi featured a Korean-language version of the group's 2011 Japanese-language single "Mr. Taxi", and an English-language version of "The Boys" was released on December 9, 2011. An international version featuring the English-language version of "The Boys" was released in January 2012 by Interscope (in US), and Polydor (in France/Europe), in order to expand the group's endeavor to the global music scene. To promote the record for international audiences, the group appeared on television shows in the United States and France.

Upon its release, The Boys received generally positive reviews from music critics. Commercially, the album was a success in the group's native country South Korea, peaking atop the Gaon Album Chart and was the best-selling album of 2011 in the country. The title track won the Digital Daesang at the 26th Golden Disc Awards. It also achieved success in other Asian countries, including Japan (reaching number 2 on the Oricon Albums Chart) and Taiwan (reaching number 3 on the G-Music chart). The record additionally charted at numbers 64 and 130 in Spain and France, respectively. In the United States, The Boys reached number 2 on the World Albums and number 17 on the Top Heatseekers.

== Background ==
In August 2011, SM Entertainment confirmed that the group will be back in September with their third full-length album, but the release date was eventually delayed to October due to Sooyoung’s unexpected car accident injury.

== Release and promotion ==
Professional ratings
Review scores
Source	Rating
AllMusic	3/5 stars
The Borneo Post	Positive
IZM	3.5/5 stars
Spectrum Culture	4.25/5

On September 26, 2011, the first teaser photo featuring Taeyeon was released online for the impending comeback for "The Boys", followed by Sunny and Hyoyeon on September 27, Jessica, Sooyoung, and Tiffany on September 28, and Yoona, Yuri, and Seohyun on September 29. The girls all represented a fairytale theme, with Taeyeon as Snow White, Sunny as Little Red Riding Hood, Hyoyeon as Thumbelina, Jessica as Elisa, Sooyoung as Rapunzel, Tiffany as Ariel, Yoona as Milady de Winter, Yuri as Karen, and Seohyun as The Snow Queen. On September 30, 2011, SM Entertainment announced that the album would be indefinitely postponed due to ongoing discussions about an album release in the United States, with details to be released as soon as they were confirmed.

On October 1, 2011, SM released the first teaser for "The Boys", followed by the second teaser on October 7, 2011. Both teasers showed Yoona picking up a black crystal, and proceeds to show the rest of the members in an outside, misty atmosphere. Later on October 13, 2011, SM Entertainment released 16-second teaser clips for both the Korean and English versions of "The Boys". The teaser depicts the girls rapping and chanting along to the song. On the same day, SM released 30-second teaser clips of "The Boys", which showed a longer version of the previous teaser videos.

The album was officially released on October 19, 2011, and the group's comeback performances commenced on October 21 starting with Music Bank. It was confirmed on November 27 that an alternate version of the album will be out on December 8. The Korean version of "Mr. Taxi" was promoted as the second single from the album and the main promotional single off the alternate version of the album.

=== International releases and promotions ===
==== Japan ====
A Japanese version of "The Boys" was produced for the repackaged album of Girls' Generation, released on December 28, 2011. It included the song "Time Machine", for which an MV was revealed on March 13, 2012. However, it was never officially promoted on Japanese TV broadcasts. On December 19, 2011, Girls' Generation performed the Japanese version of "The Boys" live on the Japanese TV reality show, Hey! Hey! Hey! Music Champ.

==== North America ====
"The Boys" was announced for an American release on November 19, 2011, under their American label Interscope Records, but after postponement, the single was released digitally on December 20 instead. SM Entertainment confirmed that the girls would promote their debut US single, "The Boys" on the late-night talk show the Late Show with David Letterman and on syndicated daytime talk show Live! with Kelly on January 31 and February 1 respectively.

The Boys was released in the US on January 17, 2012. This marks Girls' Generation's first physical release in the country, using the Korean single cover of the title track as the American album cover. Except for the English version of the title track, the entire album consists of Korean-language songs, all of which were taken from the original edition of The Boys. Four remixes of the English version of "The Boys" are also included in the US edition, the first of which features American rapper Snoop Dogg.

==== Europe ====
They performed "The Boys" on the French show, Le Grand Journal after it was announced that they were to release "The Boys" on February 13, 2012, through Universal Music Group’s Polydor Records in France.

== Singles ==
"The Boys" was released worldwide via iTunes on October 19, 2011. In an interview with MTV K, members Jessica and Tiffany mentioned that the recording of both English and Korean versions took a week to finish. The song marked the first time a Girls' Generation member had written a single for the group, with Tiffany writing the English rap and final chorus of the song. In the US, the single failed to enter the US Billboard Hot 100 but entered the Top 100 on the iTunes 200 Top Songs, and later reached the Top 30 for a moment on its first day of release. It dropped off the chart three days later; despite this, the song managed to sell over 21,000 copies. However, the Korean Version debuted at number 1 on the Billboard's K-pop Hot 100. The Korean version of "Mr. Taxi" was the album's second single to promote an alternate version of the album.

== Accolades ==
Awards and nominations for The Boys
Year	Ceremony	Award	Result	Ref.
2011	Mnet Asian Music Awards	Album of the Year	Nominated	
2012	Gaon Chart Music Awards	Album of the Year – 4th Quarter	Won	
2012	Golden Disc Awards	Disc Bonsang	Nominated	
2012	Mnet 20's Choice Awards	Album of the Year	Nominated	
2014	iF Design Award	Packaging Design	Won	
2014	Red Dot Design Award	Communication Design Award	Won	

== Commercial performance ==
The Boys was commercially successful in Asian regions. It debuted at number 1 on South Korea's Gaon Weekly Albums chart and sold over 460,000 copies in South Korea alone, which made it the best selling girl group album of the 2010s decade in the country. The album also peaked at number 2 on the Oricon Weekly Albums Chart, the standard album chart of Japan, with sales records of more than 100,000 copies in the country. In addition, the album sold 26,000 copies in Taiwan. The album charted both in Spain and France at position number 64 and number 130 respectively for one week. A total of ten songs charted within the top ten on the Gaon Chart, including "Telepathy", "Top Secret", "Vitamin", "How Great Is Your Love", and "Mr. Taxi". The US edition of The Boys has not replicated the same commercial performance as it did in its native country; the album failed to enter the Billboard 200, but debuted at number 2 on the Billboard World Albums and re-entered the Heatseekers Album Chart at number 17.

== Track listing ==
Credits adapted from Naver

The Boys – Standard edition
No.	Title	Lyrics	Music	Arrangement	Length
1.	"The Boys"	Yoo Young-jin	Teddy Riley; Dominique "DOM" Rodriguez (Audity); Richard Garcia (Audity); Taesung Kim (Iconic Sounds)	Teddy Riley; Dominique "DOM" Rodriguez (Audity); Richard Garcia (Audity); Taesung Kim (Iconic Sounds)	3:48
2.	"Telepathy" (텔레파시; Tellepasi)	Kim Boo-min	Hitchhiker	Hitchhiker	3:45
3.	"Say Yes"	Young-hu Kim	Young-hu Kim	Young-hu Kim	3:46
4.	"Trick"	Jo Yoon-kyung	Martin Hansen (The Kennel); Sarah Lundbäck Bell (The Kennel); Sam McCarthy	The Kennel; Sam McCarthy	3:15
5.	"How Great Is Your Love" (봄날; Bomnal; lit. 'Springtime')	Sooyoung	Jean T. Na; Jenny "Jenzye" Hyun	Taesung Kim (Iconic Sounds); Kim Yong-shin (Iconic Sounds)	3:54
6.	"My J"	Hwang Seong-je (BJJ Music)	Hwang Seong-je (BJJ Music)	Hwang Seong-je (BJJ Music)	3:53
7.	"Oscar"	Kim Jeong-bae	Kenzie	Kenzie	3:23
8.	"Top Secret"	Hong Ji-yoo	Mathias Peter Venge; Peter Lars Wennerberg; Gabriella Jelena Jangfeldt; Sharon Vaughn	Mathias Peter Venge; Peter Lars Wennerberg; Gabriella Jelena Jangfeldt; Sharon Vaughn	2:59
9.	"Lazy Girl (Dolce Far Niente)"	Kim Tae-yoon	Thomas Troelsen; Mikkel Remee Sigvardt; Lucas Secon	Im Kwang-wook (Devine Channel)	3:05
10.	"Sunflower" (제자리걸음; Jejarigeoleum; lit. 'Walking on the spot')	Kim Boo-min	Hitchhiker	Hitchhiker	3:50
11.	"Vitamin" (비타민; Bitamin)	Hwang Hyun (MonoTree)	Hwang Hyun (MonoTree)	MonoTree	3:10
12.	"Mr. Taxi" (Korean Version)	Jeong Hye-young; STY (Digz Inc.)	STY (Digz Inc.); Scott Mann (Echo Brothers); Chad Royce (Echo Brothers)	STY (Digz Inc.); Echo Brothers; Paolo Prudencio; Allison Veltz	3:32
13.	"The Boys" (English Version)	Tiffany Young; Yoo Young-jin; Teddy Riley	Teddy Riley; Dominique "DOM" Rodriguez (Audity); Richard Garcia (Audity); Taesung Kim (Iconic Sounds)	Teddy Riley; Dominique "DOM" Rodriguez (Audity); Richard Garcia (Audity); Taesung Kim (Iconic Sounds)	3:47
Total length:					46:02

The Boys – International edition
No.	Title	Lyrics	Music	Arrangement	Length
1.	"The Boys" (English Version)	Tiffany Young; Yoo Young-jin; Teddy Riley	Teddy Riley; Dominique "DOM" Rodriguez (Audity); Richard Garcia (Audity); Taesung Kim (Iconic Sounds)	Teddy Riley; Dominique "DOM" Rodriguez (Audity); Richard Garcia (Audity); Taesung Kim (Iconic Sounds)	3:48
2.	"Telepathy" (텔레파시; Tellepasi)	Kim Boo-min	Hitchhiker	Hitchhiker	3:45
3.	"Say Yes"	Young-hu Kim	Young-hu Kim	Young-hu Kim	3:46
4.	"Trick"	Jo Yoon-kyung	Martin Hansen (The Kennel); Sarah Lundbäck Bell (The Kennel); Sam McCarthy	The Kennel; Sam McCarthy	3:15
5.	"How Great Is Your Love" (봄날; Bomnal; lit. 'Springtime')	Sooyoung	Jean T. Na; Jenny "Jenzye" Hyun	Taesung Kim (Iconic Sounds); Kim Yong-shin (Iconic Sounds)	3:54
6.	"My J"	Hwang Seong-je (BJJ Music)	Hwang Seong-je (BJJ Music)	Hwang Seong-je (BJJ Music)	3:53
7.	"Oscar"	Kim Jeong-bae	Kenzie	Kenzie	3:23
8.	"Top Secret"	Hong Ji-yoo	Mathias Peter Venge; Peter Lars Wennerberg; Gabriella Jelena Jangfeldt; Sharon Vaughn	Mathias Peter Venge; Peter Lars Wennerberg; Gabriella Jelena Jangfeldt; Sharon Vaughn	2:59
9.	"Lazy Girl (Dolce Far Niente)"	Kim Tae-yoon	Thomas Troelsen; Mikkel Remee Sigvardt; Lucas Secon	Im Kwang-wook (Devine Channel)	3:05
10.	"Sunflower" (제자리걸음; Jejarigeoleum; lit. 'Walking on the spot')	Kim Boo-min	Hitchhiker	Hitchhiker	3:50
11.	"Vitamin" (비타민; Bitamin)	Hwang Hyun (MonoTree)	Hwang Hyun (MonoTree)	MonoTree	3:10
12.	"Mr. Taxi" (Korean Version)	Jeong Hye-young; STY (Digz Inc.)	STY (Digz Inc.); Scott Mann (Echo Brothers); Chad Royce (Echo Brothers)	STY (Digz Inc.); Echo Brothers; Paolo Prudencio; Allison Veltz	3:32
13.	"The Boys"	Yoo Young-jin	Teddy Riley; Dominique "DOM" Rodriguez (Audity); Richard Garcia (Audity); Taesung Kim (Iconic Sounds)	Teddy Riley; Dominique "DOM" Rodriguez (Audity); Richard Garcia (Audity); Taesung Kim (Iconic Sounds)	3:48
14.	"The Boys (Clinton Sparks & Disco Fries Remix)" (featuring Snoop Dogg)	Clinton Sparks; Tiffany Young; Yoo Young-jin; Teddy Riley	Nick Ditri; Danny Boselovic; Teddy Riley; Dominique "DOM" Rodriguez (Audity); Richard Garcia (Audity); Taesung Kim (Iconic Sounds)	Clinton Sparks; Disco Fries; Teddy Riley; Dominique "DOM" Rodriguez (Audity); Richard Garcia (Audity); Taesung Kim (Iconic Sounds)	4:16
15.	"The Boys *Bring Dem Boys*" (featuring Suzi)	Tiffany Young; Yoo Young-jin; Teddy Riley	Teddy Riley; Dominique "DOM" Rodriguez (Audity); Richard Garcia (Audity); Taesung Kim (Iconic Sounds)	Teddy Riley	3:36
16.	"The Boys *Bring The Boys Out*" (David Anthony Remix)	Tiffany Young; Yoo Young-jin; Teddy Riley	Teddy Riley; Dominique "DOM" Rodriguez (Audity); Richard Garcia (Audity); Taesung Kim (Iconic Sounds)	David Anthony Eames; Teddy Riley; Dominique "DOM" Rodriguez (Audity); Richard Garcia (Audity); Taesung Kim (Iconic Sounds)]	4:24
17.	"The Boys *Bring The Boys*" (Teddy Riley Remix)	Tiffany Young; Yoo Young-jin; Teddy Riley	Teddy Riley; Dominique "DOM" Rodriguez (Audity); Richard Garcia (Audity); Taesung Kim (Iconic Sounds)	Teddy Riley	4:01
Total length:					62:10

Mr. Taxi – The Boys Version B
No.	Title	Lyrics	Music	Arrangement	Length
1.	"Mr. Taxi" (Korean Version)	Jeong Hye-young; STY (Digz Inc.)	STY (Digz Inc.); Scott Mann (Echo Brothers); Chad Royce (Echo Brothers)	STY (Digz Inc.); Echo Brothers; Paolo Prudencio; Allison Veltz	3:32
2.	"The Boys"	Yoo Young-jin	Teddy Riley; Dominique "DOM" Rodriguez (Audity); Richard Garcia (Audity); Taesung Kim (Iconic Sounds)	Teddy Riley; Dominique "DOM" Rodriguez (Audity); Richard Garcia (Audity); Taesung Kim (Iconic Sounds)	3:48
3.	"Telepathy" (텔레파시; Tellepasi)	Kim Boo-min	Hitchhiker	Hitchhiker	3:45
4.	"Say Yes"	Young-hu Kim	Young-hu Kim	Young-hu Kim	3:46
5.	"Trick"	Jo Yoon-kyung	Martin Hansen (The Kennel); Sarah Lundbäck Bell (The Kennel); Sam McCarthy	The Kennel; Sam McCarthy	3:15
6.	"How Great Is Your Love" (봄날; Bomnal; lit. 'Springtime')	Sooyoung	Jean T. Na; Jenny "Jenzye" Hyun	Taesung Kim (Iconic Sounds); Kim Yong-shin (Iconic Sounds)	3:54
7.	"My J"	Hwang Seong-je (BJJ Music)	Hwang Seong-je (BJJ Music)	Hwang Seong-je (BJJ Music)	3:53
8.	"Oscar"	Kim Jeong-bae	Kenzie	Kenzie	3:23
9.	"Top Secret"	Hong Ji-yoo	Mathias Peter Venge; Peter Lars Wennerberg; Gabriella Jelena Jangfeldt; Sharon Vaughn	Mathias Peter Venge; Peter Lars Wennerberg; Gabriella Jelena Jangfeldt; Sharon Vaughn	2:59
10.	"Lazy Girl (Dolce Far Niente)"	Kim Tae-yoon	Thomas Troelsen; Mikkel Remee Sigvardt; Lucas Secon	Im Kwang-wook (Devine Channel)	3:05
11.	"Sunflower" (제자리걸음; Jejarigeoleum; lit. 'Walking on the spot')	Kim Boo-min	Hitchhiker	Hitchhiker	3:50
12.	"Vitamin" (비타민; Bitamin)	Hwang Hyun (MonoTree)	Hwang Hyun (MonoTree)	MonoTree	3:10
13.	"The Boys" (English Version)	Tiffany Young; Yoo Young-jin; Teddy Riley	Teddy Riley; Dominique "DOM" Rodriguez (Audity); Richard Garcia (Audity); Taesung Kim (Iconic Sounds)	Teddy Riley; Dominique "DOM" Rodriguez (Audity); Richard Garcia (Audity); Taesung Kim (Iconic Sounds)	3:47
Total length:					46:02

== Personnel ==
Credits for The Boys are adapted from AllMusic.

- David Anthony – Remixing
- Boo Min Kim – Composer
- Byung Seok Kim – Bass
- Byung-Ok Seo – Make-Up
- Chan Yong Eom – Engineer, String Engineer
- Hanna Cho – Repertoire
- Jane Choi – Marketing, Promoter
- Disco Fries – Remixing
- Eui Seok Jung – Engineer
- Eun-a Kim – Publicity, Public Relations
- Eun-Jeong Kwak – Engineer
- Eun-Kyeng Jung – Engineer
- Lola Fair – Vocals (Background)
- Gang-Mi Kim – Make-Up
- Richard Garcia – Arranger, Composer
- Gi-Hyun Kim – Publicity, Public Relations
- Girls' Generation – Primary Artist, Vocals (Background)
- Hae Young Jung – Composer
- Hae-Young Lee – Copyright Coordinator, Publishing
- Nikki Semin Han – Supervisor
- Martin Hansen – Arranger, Composer
- Hee-Jun Yoon – Artist Development
- Ho-Jin Kim – Management, Promoter
- Hoon Jeon – Mastering
- Greg Hwang – Choreographer, Direction
- Hye-Young Eom – Management
- Hyoyeon – Group Member
- Hyun Hwang – Arranger, Composer, Director
- Hyun-Jung Ryu – Make-Up
- Neil Jacobson – A&R
- Jae Myoung Lee – Vocal Director
- Gabriella Jelena Jangfeldt – Arranger, Composer
- Kyle Chang-Hwan Jeong – Director
- Jeung-Ah Lee – Artist Development
- Ji-Hong Kim – Management, Promoter
- Ji-Young Choi – Hair Stylist
- Ji-Young Lee – Make-Up
- Ji-Yu Hong – Composer
- John Hyun-Kyu Lee – English Supervision
- Jong-Pil Gu – Engineer, Mixing
- Jung Bae Kim – Composer
- Jung-Ah Kang – Management, Promoter
- Jam3s K3nn3dy – Additional Production
- Ji Hyun Kim – Vocals (Background)
- John Kim – Management (US), Marketing
- Tae Woo Kim – Photography
- Yongdeok Kim – Management, Promoter
- Young-Hu Kim – Arranger, Composer, Director, Engineer
- Young-Min Kim – Executive Supervision
- Kwang Wook Lim – Arranger
- Chris Sung-Su Lee – A&R, Coordination, Direction
- Jinny Lee – Marketing, Promoter
- Ji-Sun Lee – Publicity, Public Relations
- Nile Lee – Conductor, String Arrangements
- Seongho Lee – Engineer, Mixing
- Soo-Man Lee – Producer
- Sung Ho Lee – Marketing, Promoter
- Lin Kang – Marketing, Promoter
- Sarah Lundback – Arranger, Composer
- Scott Pearson Mann – Arranger, Composer
- Tony Maserati – Mixing
- Sam McCarthy – Arranger, Composer
- Hee Jin Min – Art Direction, Design, Visual Direction
- Mina Jungmin Choi – Marketing, Promoter
- Min-Kyong Kim – Copyright Coordinator, Publishing
- Mirae Seo – Vocals (Background)
- Jean T. Na – Composer
- Rino Nakasone – Choreographer
- So Young Nam – Managing Director
- Jin Namkoong – Engineer, Mixing
- Hun-Young Park – Visual Direction
- Hye Jin Park – Repertoire
- Jun-Young Park – Video Director
- Paolo Prudencio – Arranger, Composer
- Teddy Riley – Arranger, Composer, Director, Engineer, Mixing, Remixing, Vocals (Background)
- Adros Rodriguez – Mixing
- Chad Royce- Arranger, Composer
- Sang-Hee Jung – Publicity, Public Relations
- Lucas Secon – Composer
- Seohyun – Group Member
- Seong Je Hwang – Arranger, Composer, Director, Engineer
- Jae Shim – Choreographer, Direction
- Agnes Shin – Vocals (Background)
- Mikkel Remee Sigvardt – Composer
- Snoop Dogg – Featured Artist
- Soo Wan Jung – Guitar
- Soo-Koung Suh – Stylist
- Soonsoo-a-Reum Kim – Hair Stylist
- Soonsoo-Kyoung-Mee Shin – Jacket Design, Make-Up
- Clinton Sparks – Remixing
- Sung Gun Oh – Engineer, String Engineer
- Sung-Woo Choi – Management, Promoter
- Tae Yoon Kim – Composer
- Taeyeon – Group Member
- Tesung Kim – Arranger, Composer, Director, Engineer
- Thomas Troelsen – Composer
- Sharon Vaughn – Arranger, Composer
- Allison Veltz – Arranger, Composer
- Mathias Peter Venge – Arranger, Composer
- Peter Lars Wennerberg – Arranger, Composer
- Yong Shin Kim – Arranger, Conductor, Piano, String Arrangements
- Janie Yoo – A&R, Coordination, Direction
- Yoo Young-jin – Composer, Director, Engineer, Mixing, Vocals (Background)
- Yoo-Da Soonsoo-Heewon – Hair Stylist
- Young Hyun Kim – Conductor, Guitar, String Arrangements, Supervisor, Vocal Editing
- Young Shin Kim – Director
- Young Son – Video Director
- Soo Young – Composer
- Young-En Kweon – Hair Stylist
- Young-Jun Tak – Choreographer, Director
- Yung Strings – Strings
- Yun-Kyoung Cho – Composer

== Charts ==
=== Weekly charts ===
Chart (2011–12)	Peak position
French Albums (SNEP)	130
Japanese Albums (Oricon)	2
South Korean Albums (Gaon)	1
Spanish Albums (PROMUSICAE)	64
Taiwanese Albums (G-Music)	3
US World Albums (Billboard)	2
US Heatseekers Albums (Billboard)	17

=== Year-end charts ===
Chart (2011)	Position
Japanese Albums (Oricon)	95
South Korean Albums (Gaon)	1

Chart (2012)	Position
South Korean Albums (Gaon)	33

== Sales ==
Region	Certification	Certified units/sales
Japan	—	107,800
South Korea	—	471,620

== Release history ==
Region	Date	Edition	Format	Distributor(s)	Ref.
South Korea	October 19, 2011	Standard	CD; digital download	SM; KMP Holdings	
Hong Kong	October 26, 2011	Standard	CD	Universal Hong Kong	
Japan	November 5, 2011	Standard	CD	Universal Japan	
Australia	November 11, 2011	Standard	Digital download	Universal Australia	
Taiwan	November 18, 2011	Standard	CD	Universal Taiwan	
South Korea	December 9, 2011	Version B: Mr. Taxi	CD	SM	
Taiwan	January 13, 2012	Version B: Mr. Taxi	CD	Universal Taiwan	
United States	January 17, 2012	International	CD; digital download	Interscope	
France	February 13, 2012	International	CD; digital download	Polydor; Universal France	

== See also ==
- List of Gaon Album Chart number ones of 2011
- List of best-selling albums in South Korea
