= Girls & Peace =

- Digital and Regular edition cover

Studio album by Girls' Generation
- Released: November 28, 2012
- Recorded: April–October 2012
- Genre: Electropop; R&B; Bubblegum pop
- Length: 40:45
- Language: Japanese
- Label: Nayutawave, Universal Music
- Producer: Kenzie; Dapo Torimiro; DEEKAY; Trinity; Charlie Mason; Miles Walker; Dsign Music; Sebastian Thott; Allan Eshuijs; Kalle Engstrom; Erik Nyholm; Patrick Hamilton; OZGO

Girls' Generation chronology
| The Boys (2011) | Girls & Peace (2012) | I Got a Boy (2013) |

Singles from Girls' Generation II: Girls & Peace
- 1. "Paparazzi" Released: June 27, 2012; 2. "Oh!" Released: September 26, 2012; 3. "Flower Power" Released: November 21, 2012

Girls' Generation II ~Girls & Peace~ is the second Japanese studio album and the fifth overall by South Korean girl group Girls' Generation. It was released on November 28, 2012, through Nayutawave Records. Girls & Peace is the first release by all the members since their third Korean studio album "The Boys" (2011), after the group entered a semi-hiatus to pursue solo activities in South Korea. Meanwhile, Girls' Generation-TTS, the group's first subunit, was created. Continuing the electro-influenced sound from their first Japanese album, Girls & Peace features a wide range of contribution from producers, including long-time collaborator, Kenzie, as well as multiple new producers such as Miles Walker, Deekay and Dapo Torimiro. The album sold over 116,000 copies in its first week, reaching the third spot on the Oricon Album chart, and has since received a Platinum certification from the RIAJ.

Three singles were released prior to the release of the album: "Paparazzi" reached the top of the Japan Hot 100, with "Oh!" also peaking at the same spot as well as number-one on the Oricon chart. "Flower Power" peaked at number six on the Hot 100 and number five on the Oricon chart. The group promoted the album and its singles through various Japanese music and variety shows including Hey! Hey! Hey! Music Champ and Music Lovers, as well as promoting through their Girls & Peace Japan 2nd Tour throughout February and April 2013.

== Background and development ==
In May 2012, member Jessica revealed during an interview with Elle Korea that the group was working on the album, stating, "Our Japan album will be released sometime in the second half of the year. We're working hard on it". In August 2012, Nayutawave Records' parent company Universal Music reported its quarterly earnings and revealed the group to be one of the artists expected to increase revenue for the second half of 2012. The group had originally planned to make a Korean comeback during the months of October and November. However, plans were ultimately scrapped for the group to focus on Japanese promotions for the remainder of 2012.

== Release and promotion ==
The album was formally announced along with its track list on November 1, 2012. The Japanese newspaper Sankei Sports was the first to reveal concept photos for the album, which featured the group as retro-inspired flight attendants. Girls' Generation II: Girls & Peace was released on November 28, 2012. Offered in three editions, the regular edition contained the album with its twelve tracks. A limited DVD edition was offered with a 32-page photo book as well as a DVD containing the videos to the album's singles. The album was also released under a Deluxe First Press Limited Edition, which comes with a make-up case, traveler's notebook (with sticker), a set of nine solo member posters (folded), a deluxe edition 40-page photo book, as well as a bonus DVD containing seven videos to "Paparazzi", "Oh!", "All My Love is for You", "Flower Power", and the dance versions to "Paparazzi", "Oh!" and "Flower Power". They promoted the album on Hey! Hey! Hey! Music Champ, performing "Oh!", "Mr. Taxi" and "All My Love is for You".

Girls' Generation performed with fellow SMTown acts at the Tokyo Dome to two sold out dates of 100,000 people on August 4 and 5, which were later broadcast that October. On September 30, they performed "Oh!" on Count Down TV. The group pre-recorded a performance for NHK-TV's Music Japan prior to the single's release and was scheduled to be broadcast on September 30, however due to a typhoon, the broadcast was delayed. The performance was shown on October 6, with the group performing in blue cheerleading outfits. Promotion for the single continued on Nihon TV's "Music Lovers", where the group recorded a performance on September 25 for the show that was broadcast on October 8, 2012. The group performed "Oh!", "All My Love is for You" and "Mr. Taxi". The group also promoted the "Oh!" via a "Special Online Program" broadcast on three Japanese music websites across three consecutive nights; September 25, 26 and 27. On November 13, 2012, the group performed "Flower Power" on Kayou Kyoku. The same day the group held a fan meet with 10,000 people at the Yoyogi National Gymnasium, the group performed "Gee", "Oh!" and "Flower Power." On November 19, Japanese music site Dommune held a live chat with Japanese music critics during which "Girls & Peace" was previewed to fans. The group made another appearance on "Music Lovers" on November 25, 2012.

=== Concert tour ===
The group's official Japanese fan site announced in August 2012 that they would embark on their second Japanese tour in 2013. Dates were announced in September, and the tour was expected to play to fourteen crowds across six cities, including a six night stint at the Saitama Super Arena. The tour began on February 9, 2013, in Kobe, Japan.

== Reception ==
Professional ratings
Review scores
| Source | Rating |
|---|---|
| Rolling Stone Japan | 3.5/5 stars |
| Time Out | 2/5 stars |

Takuro Ueno from Rolling Stone Japan gave Girls & Peace 3.5 stars out of 5, who complimented the record's catchy production as well as the vocals of the group members. On the other hand, James Hadfield from Time Out gave the album an unfavorable review, writing that the "Girls stick mainly to the electro-inflected R&B they peddled last time around, although you'd struggle to spot many real improvements". He added, "When they divert from the formula, it's mostly to make a bid for 2NE1's tough-girl R&B crown", "just without the sass or bravura production flourishes that might've made it even semi-convincing."

Commercially, Girls & Peace reached number two on Oricon's Daily Album Chart, selling 46,031 copies, only beaten by veteran Japanese band Mr. Children. The album pulled 116,963 copies in its first week of release, ranking third on Oricon's Weekly Albums Chart. It also charted on Billboard Japan's Top Albums at number three. "Girls & Peace" has been certified Platinum by the RIAJ, denoting 250,000 copies sent to Japanese retailers. The album peaked at number six on Oricon's Monthly Album Chart, and ranked as the 41st best-selling album of the year in 2012.

== Singles ==
"Paparazzi" was released as the album's lead single on June 26, 2012. It continued the group's streak of successful Japanese releases, debuting at number one on the Japan Hot 100 and peaking at number two on the Oricon Weekly Chart, with opening week sales amounting to over 92,000 copies. "Paparazzi" was released in South Korea two months later on August 16, 2012. The single helped push the group's total physical single sales in the country to 647,000.

"Oh!" served as the second single, being released on September 26, 2012. The double A-Side single featured a Japanese remake of "Oh!" (2010), as well as an original song entitled "All My Love Is For You", which appears on the album. "Oh!" provided the group with another number one single on the Japan Hot 100, as well as the Oricon Weekly Chart.

"Flower Power" was released as album's third single on November 21, 2012. Originally scheduled for release on November 14, the single was pushed back to November 21 due to production issues. The single also contains the B-side entitled "Beep Beep", which does not appear on the album, as well as a megamix of the tracks on "Girls & Peace." The single was ultimately released on the original release date of November 14, via digital download containing "Flower Power", "Beep Beep" and "Girls' Generation II Smash Up." The single reached number six on the Hot 100, and number five on Oricon's Weekly Chart.

== Track listing ==
Credits adapted from Naver

CD
| No. | Title | Lyrics | Music | Arrangement | Length |
|---|---|---|---|---|---|
| 1. | "Flower Power" | Junji Ishiwatari | Johan Gustafson (Trinity Music); Fredrik Häggstam (Trinity Music); Sebastian Lundberg (Trinity Music) | Trinity Music | 3:18 |
| 2. | "Animal" | Kami Kaoru | Erik Nyholm; Eric Palmqwist; Tom Aeio; Hank Solo | Erik Nyholm | 3:08 |
| 3. | "I'm a Diamond" | H.U.B. | Dapo Torimiro; Priscilla Renea | Dapo Torimiro | 2:56 |
| 4. | "Reflection" | Kami Kaoru | Lars Halvor Jensen (Deekay); Martin Michael Larsson (Deekay); Zac Poor | Deekay; Zac Poor | 3:50 |
| 5. | "Stay Girls" | Kenn Kato | Sebastian Thott; Andreas Öberg; Melanie Fontana | Sebastian Thott; Andreas Öberg | 3:20 |
| 6. | "T.O.P" | Kami Kaoru | Heidi Rojas; Allan Eshuijs; Kalle Engström | Allan Eshuijs; Kalle Engström | 3:37 |
| 7. | "Boomerang" | Nakamura Kanata | Danny Saucedo; Charlie Mason; Oscar Görres | Danny Saucedo; Charlie Mason; Oscar Görres | 2:50 |
| 8. | "Oh!" (Japanese Version) | Maezawa Nozomi (agehasprings) | Kim Jeong-bae; Young-hu Kim | Kenzie | 3:09 |
| 9. | "All My Love is for You" | Junji Ishiwatari; Maezawa Nozomi (agehasprings) | Sebastian Thott; Didrik Thott; Robin Lerner | Sebastian Thott | 3:43 |
| 10. | "Paparazzi" | Junji Ishiwatari | Junji Ishiwatari; Fredrik Thomander; Johan Becker | Fredrik Thomander; Johan Becker | 3:47 |
| 11. | "Girls & Peace" | Hidenori Tanaka | Anne Judith Wik; Ronny Svendsen; Nermin Harambašić; Robin Jenssen; Christian "Vince" Vinten | Dsign Music | 3:27 |
| 12. | "Not Alone" | Kami Kaoru | Erik Nyholm; Patrick Hamilton | Erik Nyholm; Patrick Hamilton | 3:31 |
| Total length: | | | | | 40:45 |

DVD (Deluxe First Press Limited Edition)
| No. | Title | Length |
|---|---|---|
| 1. | "Paparazzi" (Music Video) | 6:37 |
| 2. | "Oh!" (Music Video) | 4:11 |
| 3. | "All My Love is for You" (Music Video) | 4:07 |
| 4. | "Flower Power" (Music Video) | 3:42 |
| 5. | "Paparazzi" (Music Video – Gold Version) | 3:57 |
| 6. | "Oh!" (Music Video – Dance Version) | 3:12 |
| 7. | "Flower Power" (Music Video – Dance Version) | 3:23 |

DVD (First Press Limited Edition)
| No. | Title | Length |
|---|---|---|
| 1. | "Paparazzi" (Music Video) | 6:37 |
| 2. | "Oh!" (Music Video) | 4:11 |
| 3. | "All My Love is for You" (Music Video) | 4:07 |
| 4. | "Flower Power" (Music Video) | 3:42 |

DVD (Thailand & Philippines Edition)
| No. | Title | Length |
|---|---|---|
| 1. | "Paparazzi" (Music Video - Close Up Edit) | 4:09 |
| 2. | "Oh!" (Music Video) | 4:11 |
| 3. | "All My Love is for You" (Music Video) | 4:07 |
| 4. | "Flower Power" (Music Video) | 3:42 |

== Charts ==
=== Weekly charts ===
| Chart (2012–13) | Peak position |
|---|---|
| Japanese Albums (Oricon) | 3 |
| Japanese Top Albums (Billboard) | 3 |
| Taiwanese Albums (G-Music) | 11 |

=== Year-end charts ===
| Chart (2012) | Position |
|---|---|
| Japanese Albums (Oricon) | 41 |

| Chart (2013) | Position |
|---|---|
| Japanese Top Albums (Billboard) | 24 |

== Sales and certifications ==
| Region | Certification | Certified units/sales |
|---|---|---|
| Japan (RIAJ) | Platinum | 204,000 |

== Release history ==
| Region | Date | Format | Edition | Label |
|---|---|---|---|---|
| Japan | November 28, 2012 | CD, digital download | Deluxe First Press Limited Edition, First Press Limited Edition, Regular Edition | Nayutawave Records |
| United Kingdom | November 28, 2012 | Digital download | Regular Edition | Universal Music |
| Taiwan | December 7, 2012 | CD | First Press Limited Edition, Regular Edition | Universal Music |
| Hong Kong | December 21, 2012 | CD | First Press Limited Edition, Regular Edition | Universal Music |
| Thailand | January 31, 2013 | CD | First Press Limited Edition | Universal Music |
| Philippines | February 11, 2013 | CD | First Press Limited Edition | MCA Music |
