= Beat Freaks =

American hip hop group

The Beat Freaks
- Origin: Los Angeles, California, United States
- Genres: Hip-hop, B-girls
- Years active: 2003–present
- Members: Alison “Al*Star” Faulk; Teresa "Ragdoll" Espinosa; Lindsey "LindseyB OUTTHERE” Blaufarb; Jules "Lady Jules" Urich; Keeley “LockN’ Key” Kaukimoce; Rino Nakasone Razalan; Marie "Maryss from Paris" Courchinoux; Alex Welch; Bonita "Bgirl Bonita" Lovett; Randi Fleckenstine
- Website: theBeatFreaks.com

Beat Freaks is an all-female breaking dance crew from Los Angeles, California. Each of its ten members have achieved individual success dancing before becoming part of the group, which was created in 2003. The Beat Freaks were featured on MTV's America's Best Dance Crew (Season 3) and finished the show as runners-up.

== Overview ==
In 2003, seven original members came together to form the crew, being: Alison "Al*Star" Faulk, Teresa "Ragdoll" Espinosa, LindseyB "OUTTHERE", Julie "Lady Jules" Urich, Keeley "LockN' Key", Rino Nakasone, and Marie "Maryss from Paris" Courchinoux. All original members, minus Nakasone and Courchinoux, had previously worked together in another group called the "Groovaloos." When the crew decided to participate in America's Best Dance Crew, they recruited Alex Welch "BGirl Shorty". BGirl Bonita integrated in 2010; she, too, took part of the group "Groovaloos" with the seven original members. In May 2015, the crew added another member, Randi Fleckenstine. With the exception of Rino and Maryss, all members were born and raised in the United States. Rino was born in Okinawa, Japan, and Maryss was born in Paris. Each of the crew members have appeared in music videos, films, and tours with world-renowned artists that include: Pink, Britney Spears, Madonna, Janet Jackson, Miley Cyrus, Chris Brown, The Jonas Brothers and Avril Lavigne. As individual dancers, they have made appearances on: "You Got Served", "Step Up 2: The Streets", "Stick It", "Prom Night", "Go For It!", "Camp Rock 2: The Final Jam", "Shake It Up" and "B-Girl", which stars Lady Jules as the main character. In 2008, the crew was featured in the highly publicized dance battle YouTube videos with Miley Cyrus, dancing beside Miley. They also had an appearance in Justin Bieber's music video for "Somebody To Love". In 2010 they were voted Best Female Dance Crew at the World of Dance Awards.

== Members ==
=== Alison "Al*Star" Faulk ===
Alison Faulk, commonly known as Al*Star, hails from southern Florida. She was unable to participate in America's Best Dance Crew, because she was on tour with Pink at the time. She does not specialize in one particular dance style, and claims that she is an "all styles" dancer. She is one of the original members of Groovaloos and a part of the stage show is based on her life.

=== Teresa "Ragdoll" Espinosa ===
Teresa Espinosa was born and raised in Dallas, Texas. After graduating from CalArts (California Institute of the Arts) she toured the world with Janet Jackson on The Velvet Rope World Tour, and got nominated for an Emmy in additional choreography that year. She specializes in freestyle and is inspired by Michael Jackson among countless others. She has worked as a choreographer on the Hannah Montana & Miley Cyrus: Best of Both Worlds Concert and has toured with Britney Spears, on her 2004's world tour Onyx Hotel Tour. Teresa is a faculty member at the hip-hop dance convention Monsters of Hip-Hop. She is one of the original members of Groovaloos and a part of the stage show is based on her life.

=== Lindsey "LindseyB Outthere" Blaufarb ===
Lindsey Blaufarb was raised in San Antonio, Texas. Lindsey started off in musical theater and athletics, then later started hip hop dancing at the age of 17. She was an Air force brat and was constantly moving around.

She is inspired by her own members, having admired them before joining the group. She has been on tour with Pink and Avril Lavigne. She is one of the original members of Groovaloos and a part of the stage show is based on her life.

=== Jules "Lady Jules" Urich ===
She has many years experience doing commercials, music videos, and much more. Some commercials she has been featured in include Wal-Mart, GAP, Nike and Jolly Rancher. B-Girl Jules starred as the main character whose dreams of being a break dancer are put on hold when she is stabbed. Jules is also an animal rights activist. She works closely with a charity called The Cat House on the Kings and is a strong supporter of PETA. She is one of the original members of Groovaloos and a part of the stage show is based on her life. Jules is the one who made the first headspin ever from a lady in the fourth episode of America's Best Dance Crew which is considered the Wack Track challenge.

=== Keeley "LockN' Key" Kaukimoce ===
Keeley was born and raised in Dallas, Texas. Keeley specializes in locking and is known as the first female student of Greg Campbellock Jr. She has traveled internationally teaching locking and party dances as well as choreographed for several artists including Miley Cyrus, and Disney’s Youngstown. Some of her accomplishments are appearing in My Wife and Kids, Legally Blonde, Run DMC “It’s Like That” video, and You Got Served' as well as Nickelodeon’s “All That”, Bob Heart Abishola and many more. She is one of the original members of Groovaloos, and a part of the stage show is based on her life. Keeley is married with two children. She is a television and film producer, keynote speaker, leadership training facilitator, and has a passion for health and wellness.

=== Marie Courchinoux "Maryss from Paris" ===
Born in 1980, Courchinoux was born and raised in Paris, France. She said she grew a love for dance after seeing Michael Jackson dance on television when she was younger. It drove her to travel the world and want to dance with the most greatest dancers. Her moniker "Maryss" was formed from Mary (English version of Marie) and "super star". She has an extensive resume in commercials, having done advertisements with Sprite, Pepsi, Old Navy, J. C. Penney, and iPod. She has performed with numerous artists including Missy Elliott, Common, Kovas, and The Black Eyed Peas. She has toured with Chris Brown and Justin Timberlake. Maryss and Rino teach at Debbie Reynolds' dance studio in Los Angeles under the stage duo name The Geminiz. Both were also back-up dancers in Chris Brown's music video, "Forever".

=== Alex "BGirl Shorty" Welch ===
Alex Welch, commonly referred to as BGirl Shorty or Shorty, born October 21, 1989, in Orlando, Florida, but raised in Salt Lake City, Utah. She is the youngest of the crew members, but said to be the most hyper and energetic of them all. Both her parents are professional ballet dancers, but she claims that when she was younger she hated dancing and strongly disliked going to the studio with her parents and seeing tutus. However, when she was 11 years old she saw a headspin during a Christina Aguilera music video and was fascinated by it. She quickly began to learn breaking and grew to love dance, learning as many different styles as she could. She said prior to joining Beat Freaks, she looked up to them and dreamed of being in the crew; however, she knew they were not recruiting. That quickly changed when she found out the crew was in fact looking for an additional member that could step in for Alison during the third season of America's Best Dance Crew. When she joined, she said it was like a dream come true. Welch appeared in the films, such as Stick It, Date Movie, Step Up 2: The Streets, Bring It On: All or Nothing, Prom Night and Camp Rock 2: The Final Jam. She has worked with Pink and Miley Cyrus. Welch has made appearances in the TeenNick show The Nightlife and Disney's Shake It Up. As an individual dancer, Welch has appeared in four music videos: Toni Braxton's "Make My Heart", Jennifer Lopez's "Live It Up", Ariana Grande's "Baby I" and "It's On" by the cast of Camp Rock 2: The Final Jam. Welch was a backup dancer on Britney Spears' Femme Fatale World Tour and she was part of the Jonas Brothers: Live in Concert tour with the Jonas Brothers, Demi Lovato and the cast of Camp Rock 2: The Final Jam for promoting the film of the same name. In late December 2010, Welch considered taking legal action lawsuit against Demi Lovato, after a confrontation with her led to Lovato punching Welch in the face on tour. Later, they settled the claim and Welch received less than $100,000. On November 22, 2012, after two years since the incident, Welch reunited with Lovato on the set of The X Factor (US) and they apologized.

=== Bonita "Bgirl Bonita" Lovett ===
Coming from a classically trained background in Phoenix, Arizona, Lovett began her professional dance career performing with and choreographing for the Phoenix Mercury Hip-Hop Squad and the Phoenix Suns Dance Team. She has danced for artists P. Diddy, The Black Eyed Peas, Sean Kingston, Fergie, Jamiroquai, Wyclef Jean, Redman, The Beach Boys, Q-Tip, Eric Sermon, Rob Base, KRS-One and Doug E. Fresh. Not only has she had the opportunity to perform with such artists, she has also been featured in Disney's Shake It Up, Nickolodeon's Fresh Beat Band and has worked on RIO. She's been featured in commercials and also worked with Nike, Adidas, Skechers and many more. Before moving to Los Angeles to pursue her career, Lovett co-founded and directed Automatic Response, a non-profit dance company. After moving to LA, she became a member of the Groovaloo’s, an LA based Hip-Hop Company, where she continues to perform in their theater production of Groovaloo. Bonita has been teaching, judging and choreographing professionally for 10 years nationally and internationally. She has bridged her classic studio training with the culture of hip-hop to produce her unique and dynamic style. She is a member of The Legendary Rock Steady Crew and was seen performing with them on “Dancing with the Stars” as well as battling with them all over the world. Crazy Legs president of RSC, is one of her biggest mentors.

=== Randi Fleckenstine ===
Randi Fleckenstine was born and raised in Northern California, but her dance career began in Boulder Colorado. While studying at the University of Colorado, Randi joined a break dancing crew called Streetstylez. She then explored further in dancing with funk styles and choreo hip hop. She was also a part of the performance crew, True II Form. She taught a variety of classes from popping, locking and breaking to teen choreo at Streetside Dance Studios in Boulder, Co. She is the newest member of the Beat Freaks, integrating into the crew in May 2015.

== America's Best Dance Crew ==
Beat Freaks are runners-up for the third season of America's Best Dance Crew; losing to Quest Crew. Beat Freaks were the first all-female crew to make it to the finals of the competition and received much praise from judges JC Chasez, Lil Mama, and Shane Sparks. During the season they were recognized by their large banner with the logo of a bright-yellow boombox. Their signature is considered to be the V hand signal, which in the U.S. means "peace". During World War II the sign was used by Winston Churchill as a sign for "Victory."

=== Dance in ABDC ===
==== Performances ====
Week	Challenge	Music	Result
1: Sudden Death Challenge	None	Din Daa Daa - George Kranz	Safe
2: Fit Test Challenge	Side Plank	Independent - Webbie featuring Lil' Boosie	Safe
3: Britney Spears Challenge	Perform the masculine and feminine sides of Britney from the video.	Womanizer - Britney Spears	Safe
4: Whack Track Challenge	Perform while doing the Carlton dance.	Pretty Fly (For a White Guy) - The Offspring	Safe
5: Illusion Challenge	Perform while making something levitate.	Freeze - T-Pain ft. Chris Brown	Safe
6: Battle of The Sexes Challenge	Incorporate the Louisville Slugger within the routine.	Hot n Cold - Katy Perry	Safe
7: Hip-Hop Decathlon Challenge	Incorporate hip-hops most difficult styles of dancing in their routine	Threading: Poker Face - Lady Gaga; Tutting: Love Lockdown - Kanye West; Waving: I'm in Miami Bitch (Trick) - LMFAO; Housing: Closer - Ne-Yo; Krumping: Get Up - 50 Cent	Safe
7: Hip-Hop Decathlon Challenge	Last Chance to hook the voters using an original performance	"Freak The Dream"	Safe
8: The Live Finale	Partners: Boxcuttuhz; Team Millennia	Just Dance - Lady Gaga	Runners-up
8: The Live Finale	Partner: Quest Crew	Beggin' - Madcon	Runners-up

== Appearances ==
The Beat Freaks spent much of their on-air time encouraging young girls to dance and follow their dreams. Coming on to the show they came up with a campaign called "Freak the Vote." Knowing that Freak the Vote would only apply on ABDC they decided to come up with something that would carry on even after the show. After discussing and collaborating as a group, they came up with "Freak the Dream."

The Beat Freaks' Illusion Challenge performance placed 6th on the Top 10 America's Best Dance Crew Performances of All Time.

=== Music Videos ===
Beat Freaks have appeared in three music videos: Diddy's "Love Come Down" in 2009, Justin Bieber's "Somebody to Love" in 2010, and Australian dance crew/rappers and singers Justice Crew's Dance With Me fFt Flo Rida in 2011. Maryss, Bonita & Shorty appeared in the video for Minus the Bear's "My Time" in 2010. Shorty appeared in Toni Braxton's Make My Heart music video in 2010.

=== Movies ===
As a crew, Beat Freaks will be making appearances in the movie Honey 2 and Go For It.

=== Other ===
In early 2010, Beat Freaks collaborated with Nike Women and have been heavily featured in the Nike Women website.

On June 17, 2010, they performed at the NBA finals halftime show in Game 7 of Lakers vs. Celtics.

Lindsey Blaufarb appeared as a co-choreographer on the finale of Syfy's Face Off, which aired March 14, 2012.

== Fans ==
A graphic novel titled "8 Valkyries," is currently being written by fan Gregory Michel, and is said to be inspired by the crew itself. Each member of the Beat Freaks is portrayed as a different Valkyrie that shows similar physical characteristics.
