= Flower Power (song) =

Single by Girls' Generation

from the album Girls & Peace
- B-side: "Beep Beep"; "Girls' Generation 2 Smash-Up"
- Released: November 21, 2012
- Recorded: 2012
- Genre: Electropop; Dance-pop
- Length: 3:18
- Label: Nayutawave; UMG
- Songwriters: Johan Gustafson, Fredrik Häggstam, Sebastian Lundberg, Junji Ishiwatari
- Producers: Trinity, Dsign Music

Girls' Generation singles chronology
"Oh!" (2012)	"Flower Power" (2012)	"Dancing Queen" (2013)

Music video
- "Flower Power" on YouTube

"Flower Power" is the sixth Japanese single released by South Korean girl group Girls' Generation. The single was released on November 14, 2012, via digital download on iTunes Japan, with a limited physical release on November 21, 2012. It serves as the third single from their second Japanese studio album, Girls & Peace (2012). Despite limited release, "Flower Power" sold 29,000 copies in its first week, peaking at number five on the Oricon Singles Chart; the single also reached number six on the Billboard Japan Hot 100.

== Background ==
After the success of the preceding singles, "Paparazzi" and "Oh!", both of which took the number one spot on the Oricon daily singles chart and sold a collective total of more than 190,000 copies, the group's follow-up single "Flower Power" was announced on October 2, 2012. "Flower Power" was released in Japan on November 14, 2012, two weeks before the release of their second Japanese studio album. A concept photo released by the group's Japanese label shows the group trying to escape searchlights.

== Release ==
The single was not released physically until November 21 because of problems with production. The single's B-side, "Beep Beep," is not included on Girls & Peace (2012), but it is included as the sixth track on their third Japanese studio album, Love & Peace (2013), released on December 11, 2013. The single also contains a medley of the accompanying album which features Jamaican rapper Sean Paul.

== Composition ==
"Flower Power" is written by Johan Gustafson, Fredrik Häggstam, Sebastian Lundberg (who composed labelmate TVXQ's "Blink"). It is an up-tempo electropop and dance-pop number, taking influences from trance and electro house, with a "flowing" bassline and a chorus line demonstrating the "sexy side" of Girls' Generation, contrary to the single's title. Lyrically, the song describes "the strategic moves between a man and a woman on the dancefloor," sung by the group with "the sound and light of a glitzy atmosphere."

== Music video ==
On October 31, 2012, the music was released in two versions: the regular and dance version. Within the song's perspective of the world, the nine girls sing and dance in a near future cosplay image of “bondage”-like cabin attendants under a fictional airline company, Air GG.

On April 5, 2013, a shortened version of the music video for "Beep Beep" was released. A full version of the music video was released on the group's third Japanese album, Love & Peace (2013).

== Chart performance ==
The single didn't match the success of its predecessors in its first week, the single peaked at number twenty-five when it debuted on the Billboard Japan Hot 100 for the week ending on November 26, 2012. The single managed to sell 13,000 copies on its first day, charting at number two on Oricon's Daily Single Chart. It eventually sold 29,000 copies during its first week of physical release. The single raced to number six on the Japan Hot 100 in its second week, jumping nineteen spots. The single also charted on the Hot Single Sales chart at number four, as well as Billboard Japan's airplay charts: twelve on Contemporary Airplay and thirty-two on Top Airplay.

== Live performance ==
The group performed the song for the first time on TBS Kayou Kyoku on November 13, 2012. The same day, the group held their "Playing with Girls' Generation" fan meeting with 10,000 people at the Yoyogi National Gymnasium. The group performed the song along with "Gee" and "Oh!".

== Track listing ==
Regular Edition CD
No.	Title	Writer(s)	Producer(s)	Length
1.	"Flower Power"	Johan Gustafson, Fredrik Häggstam, Sebastian Lundberg, Junji Ishiwatari	Trinity	3:18
2.	"Beep Beep"	Jeff Miyahara, Anne Judith Wik, Ronny Svendsen, Nermin Harambasic, Robin Jenssen	Dsign Music	3:21
3.	"Girls' Generation 2 Smash-Up" (featuring Sean Paul)	Various	Various	3:26
Total length:				10:06

== Charts ==
Chart (2012)	Peak position
Japan (Oricon)	5
Japan Hot 100 (Billboard)	6

=== Sales ===
Country	Sales
Japan (Oricon)	39,007 (physical)

== Release history ==
Region	Date	Format	Label
Worldwide	November 14, 2012	digital download	Nayutawave Records
Japan	November 21, 2012	CD	Nayutawave Records
Taiwan	November 23, 2012	CD	Nayutawave Records
