= The Boys (Girls' Generation song) =

2011 single by Girls' Generation

Single by Girls' Generation

from the album The Boys
- Released: October 18, 2011
- Recorded: 2011
- Studio: SM Booming System (Seoul)
- Genre: Dance-pop; electropop; R&B
- Length: 3:46
- Label: SM; Interscope
- Composers: Teddy Riley; Taesung Kim; DOM; Richard Garcia
- Lyricists: Yoo Young-jin (Korean); Teddy Riley (English); Hidenori Tanaka, Nozomi Maezawa (Japanese)

Girls' Generation singles chronology
"Mr. Taxi / Run Devil Run" (2011)	"The Boys" (2011)	"Paparazzi" (2012)

Music video
- "The Boys" on YouTube

"The Boys" is a song recorded by South Korean girl group Girls' Generation for their third Korean language studio album with the same name. Composed and arranged by Teddy Riley, Taesung Kim, DOM, and Richard Garcia, the song was described as a dance-pop, electropop and R&B song with elements of hip hop that lyrically discusses female attractiveness. The Korean version was released on October 18, 2011, by SM Entertainment as the lead single from the album. An English version was subsequently released in the United States on December 20, 2011, by Interscope Records and Universal Music Group in order to expand the group's popularity outside their native country.

Following the release of "The Boys", Girls' Generation appeared on several South Korean music programs including Music Bank, Show! Music Core, Inkigayo, and M Countdown. To further promote the song to American audiences, the group performed at Madison Square Garden in New York City on October 23, 2011, and made their debut on US television with appearances on Late Show with David Letterman and Live! with Kelly and Michael in February 2012. A music video for the song was directed by Hong Won-ki and choreographed by Rino Nakasone and was released on October 19, 2011.

"The Boys" was a success domestically. It peaked atop the South Korean Gaon Digital Chart and sold over three million digital copies in 2011, becoming the 43rd best-performing single on the chart of the year. Internationally, the single received generally positive reviews from music critics, who complimented the song as one of the highlights of the Korean Wave. In the United States, it managed to sell over 21,000 copies in its first week of release and peaked at number 5 on the Billboard Hot Dance Singles Sales, while in Japan, the single peaked at number 12 on the Billboard Japan Hot 100.

== Background and composition ==
"The Boys" was composed and arranged by Teddy Riley, Taesung Kim, DOM, and Richard Garcia. The original Korean version of the song was written by Yoo Young-jin, while the English version was written by Riley. It was released on October 18, 2011, as a digital single worldwide by SM Entertainment. A digital extended play which consists of the English version and remixes of "The Boys" was released on December 20, 2011, by SM Entertainment under exclusive license to Universal Music Group. A maxi single of the song released on December 21, 2011. A remix version of the song produced by electronica musicians Clinton Sparks and The Disco Fries featuring Snoop Dogg was included on the US edition. A Japanese version was written by Hidenori Tanaka and Nozomi Maezawa and was included on the group's reissue of their debut Japanese album, Girls' Generation, which was entitled The Boys and released on December 28, 2011.

To further promote their popularity to Western countries, SM Entertainment had the group signed with Interscope Records, which is affiliated with Universal Music Group, to debut in the United States. In an interview with MTV K, member Tiffany shared that the recording session of the song, both the English and Korean version, took one week to finish. She also expressed her excitement of the song's release in the United States, "We haven’t started on a full-length album, but we’re kicking off with this maxi single and hopefully it will lead to a full-length album."

"The Boys" – Girls' Generation
"The Boys" is an electropop and R&B song that lyrically talks about female attractiveness.

Musically, "The Boys" is a dance-pop, electropop and R&B song, with elements of hip hop, a genre that Girls' Generation had never ventured into. It features "military style drum breakdowns and killer vocal harmonies" in its composition, according to Angelica Wallingford from the San Diego City Times. The song's lyrics as explained by Eun-Young Jung on the book The Korean Wave: Korean Media Go Global (2013) as portraying "sexually daring girls" who are confident in their attractiveness and enjoy attention from men: (Note: The quoted lyrics are from the English version of the song.)

I can tell you're looking at me, I know what you see
Any closer and you'll feel the heat
You don't have to pretend that you didn't notice me
Every look will make it hard to breathe
B-Bring the boys out

== Promotion ==
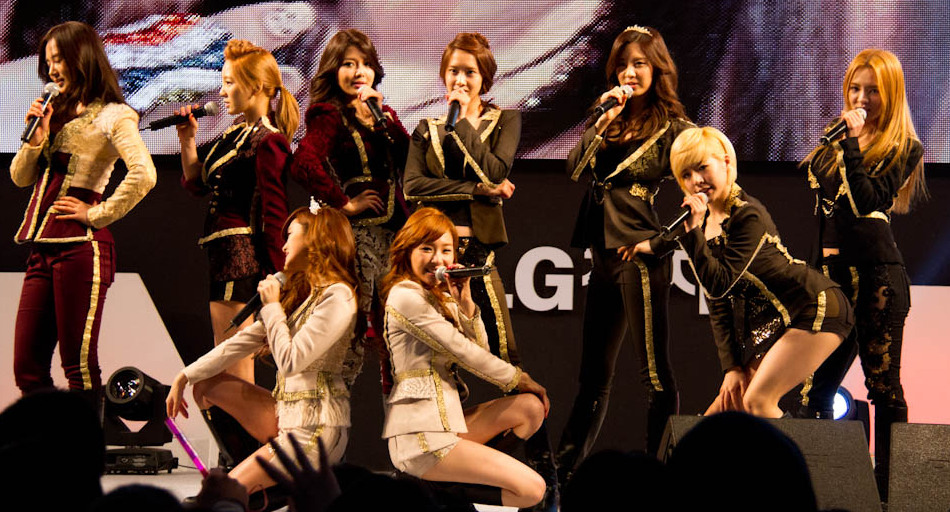
Girls' Generation performing at LG Cinema 3D World Festival in 2012

From October through December 2011, Girls' Generation appeared on several South Korean music programs including Music Bank, Show! Music Core, Inkigayo, and M Countdown to promote "The Boys" and the album. To further promote the song to American audiences, the group appeared at Madison Square Garden in New York on October 23, 2011, and performed the song, as part of an SM Town concert, which also featured other SM Entertainment's singers and performers, including Shinee and f(x).

Girls' Generation promoted "The Boys" upon making their debut on American television in February 2012. The group performed the English version of the song on two television shows: Late Show with David Letterman and Live! with Kelly and Michael on February 1. Their performances received generally positive reviews from US media outlets. Bradley Stern from MuuMuse labelled the group's appearances on US television a "stunning win" for supporters of Korean music, while David Bevan from Spin wrote "It's like a dream." Nevertheless, viewers' response were divided–some accused the members of lip syncing and expressed their disdain for their performance, while others were impressed by the group's dancing skills and musical style.

A music video for "The Boys" was directed by Hong Won-ki and choreographed by Rino Nakasone. It was released on October 19, 2011, on YouTube and several South Korean music websites. The video starts with a close up-of each members before switching to the dancing scenes. It was an instant success on YouTube, achieving 13 million views in one week. It has since attracted over 100 million views on YouTube, becoming the group's third music video to do so following "Gee" and "I Got a Boy". With this achievement, Girls' Generation became the first music girl group to have three music videos with over 100 million views as of September 2014, surpassing the Pussycat Dolls, who had two videos with over 100 million views.

== Reception ==
=== Commercial ===
"The Boys" was a success in South Korea. Following its release, the song immediately achieved number one spots on music programs Music Bank, Inkigayo, and M Countdown. On Music Bank, the single occupied the number one position for six weeks. It peaked at number one on the Gaon Digital Chart and sold over 3.032 million digital downloads in 2011, becoming the 10th best-selling single and the 43rd best-performing single (including streaming and instrumental track downloads) on the Gaon Chart. The single also peaked atop the Billboard Korea K-Pop Hot 100 instead. In the United States, the track peaked at numbers 5 and 15 the Hot Dance Singles Sales and Hot Singles Sales, respectively, and managed to sell 21,000 copies in its first week of release, according to Nielsen SoundScan. In Japan, "The Boys" charted at number 12 on the Billboard Japan Hot 100 chart.

=== Critical ===
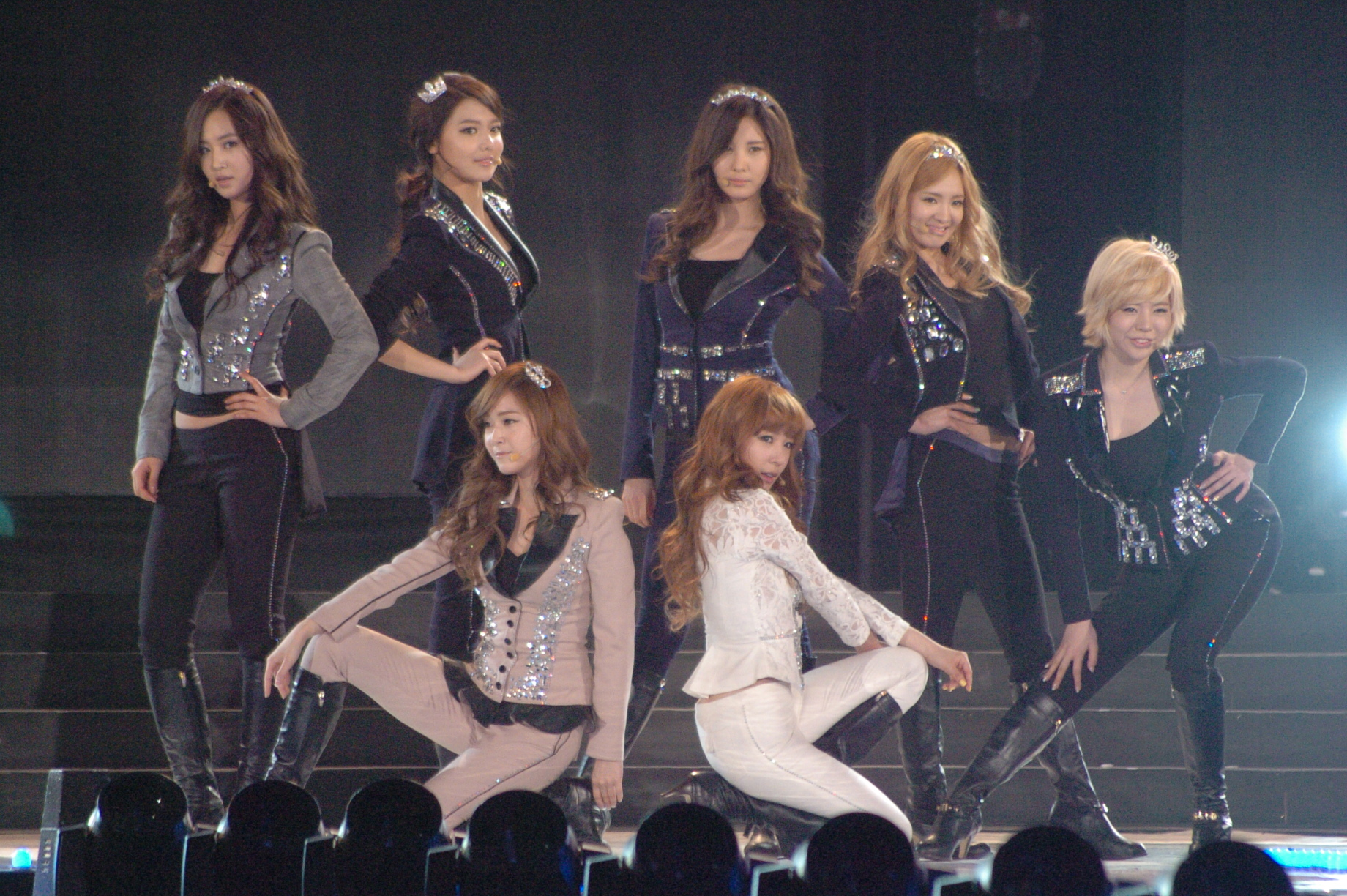
Girls' Generation performing at 2012 K-Pop Collection

"The Boys" received generally positive reviews from music critics. Katherine St Asaph from Popdust gave the song three and a half out of five stars, complimenting the song's production but criticizing its lack of a "memorable" chorus. Jen Erenza from Ryan Seacrest's official blog praised it as a "foot-stomping, head-crackin', and girl-powered track sung by nine girls that everyone needs to hear". AllMusic's Tim Sendra named it the best song on The Boys and wrote that "Girls' Generation have what it takes to conquer the world of pop". Chris True from the same website picked "The Boys" as well as its English version and remix featuring Snoop Dogg as three outstanding songs throughout the group's career.

Jaeki Cho from Vibe described the group's music as "Spice Girls meet Pussycat Dolls" and recommended "The Boys" to download. Smith Sonian noted "The Boys" as one of the highlights of Korean music (K-pop) in the Korean Wave along with "Only One" by BoA, "Sorry, Sorry" by Super Junior, "Gangnam Style" by Psy, "Fantastic Baby" by Big Bang", and "I Am the Best" by 2NE1.

Several reviewers expected that Girls' Generation would achieve success with their electropop music styles following their appearance on US television. Mio Scobie, editor of Us Weekly wrote that "They produce feelgood beats, instantly memorable choruses and, as I'm sure people have already noticed, they're stunning." McClure's Asia Music News writer Steve McClure also anticipated that the group would succeed on the Western music scene, saying that "I have a feeling that Girls' Generation will stick round for a while."

== Accolades ==
Awards and nominations
Year	Organization	Award	Result	Ref.
2011	Melon Music Awards	Netizen Popular Song	Nominated	
2012	Gaon Chart K-Pop Awards	Song of the Month (October)	Nominated	
2012	Golden Disc Awards	Digital Bonsang	Won	
2012	Golden Disc Awards	Digital Daesang	Won	
2012	Myx Music Awards	Favorite K-Pop Video	Nominated	

Music program awards
Program	Date	Ref.
M Countdown	October 27, 2011	
M Countdown	November 3, 2011	
M Countdown	November 10, 2011	
Music Bank	October 28, 2011	
Music Bank	November 4, 2011	
Music Bank	November 11, 2011	
Music Bank	November 18, 2011	
Music Bank	November 25, 2011	
Music Bank	December 2, 2011	
Inkigayo	October 30, 2011	
Inkigayo	November 6, 2011	
Inkigayo	November 13, 2011	

== Track listing ==
Digital download

1. "The Boys" – 3:46
2. "The Boys" (Instrumental) – 3:46

Maxi single and EP

1. "The Boys" – 3:48
2. "The Boys" (Clinton Sparks & Disco Fries Remix) (featuring Snoop Dogg) – 4:17
3. "The Boys" (Clinton Sparks & Disco Fries Remix) (featuring Lil Playy) – 4:17
4. "The Boys" *Bring Dem Boys* (Teddy Riley Remix) (featuring Suzi) – 3:39
5. "The Boys" *Bring the Boys Out* (David Anthony Remix) – 4:27
6. "The Boys" *Bring the Boys* (Teddy Riley Remix) – 3:48
7. "The Boys" (Instrumental) – 3:48
8. "The Boys" (A Capella) – 3:46

== Charts ==
=== Weekly charts ===
Korean version
Chart (2011)	Peak position
Japan (Japan Hot 100)	12
South Korea (Gaon)	1
South Korea (K-pop Hot 100)	1

English version
Chart	Peak position
South Korea (Gaon)	62
US Hot Dance Single Sales (Billboard)	5
US Hot Singles Sales (Billboard)	15

=== Year-end charts ===
Year-end chart positions
Chart (2011)	Position
South Korea (Gaon)	43

== Credits and personnel ==
Credits adapted from album's liner notes.

Studio

- SM Booming System – recording, mixing
- Sonic Korea – mastering

Personnel

- SM Entertainment – executive producer
- Lee Soo-man – producer
- Kim Young-min – executive supervisor
- Girls' Generation – vocals, background vocals
- Yoo Young-jin – Korean lyrics, vocal directing, background vocals, recording, mixing
- Teddy Riley – English lyrics, composition, arrangement, vocal directing, background vocals, recording, mixing
- Hidenori Tanaka – Japanese lyrics
- Nozomi Maezawa – Japanese lyrics
- Taesung Kim – composition, arrangement
- Dominique "DOM" Rodriguez – composition, arrangement
- Richard Garcia – composition, arrangement
- Jeon Hoon – mastering

== Release history ==
Country	Date	Format	Label
Worldwide	October 18, 2011	Digital download	SM Entertainment; Interscope Records
South Korea	October 22, 2011	Contemporary hit radio	SM Entertainment
Worldwide	December 20, 2011	Digital EP	SM Entertainment; Interscope Records; Universal Music Group
Worldwide	December 21, 2011	Maxi single	SM Entertainment; Interscope Records; Universal Music Group

== See also ==
- List of Gaon Digital Chart number ones of 2011
- List of Korea K-Pop Hot 100 number ones

== Footnotes ==
Notes
