= Hoot (song) =

Single by Girls' Generation

from the EP Hoot
- Released: October 25, 2010
- Recorded: 2010
- Genre: Electropop; beach pop
- Length: 3:18
- Label: SM
- Composers: Alex James; Lars Halvor Jensen; Martin Michael Larsson
- Lyricists: John Hyunkyu Lee (Korean); Kanata Nakamura (Japanese)
- Producer: Deekay

Girls' Generation singles chronology
"Gee" (2010)	"Hoot" (2010)	"Mr. Taxi / "Run Devil Run" (2011)

Music video
- "Hoot" on YouTube

"Hoot" (Korean: 훗) is the lead single from Hoot, the third EP of South Korean girl group Girls' Generation. It became the ninth hit song for the group, topped the chart in their nation. "Hoot" was released on October 25, 2010. A Japanese-language version was also released on their first Japanese album, Girls' Generation on June 1, 2011.

== Background ==
"Hoot" was originally titled "Bulletproof" and written with English lyrics. It was composed by Danish songwriter-producers Martin Michael Larsson and Lars Halvor Jensen, of Deekay, together with British songwriter Alex James, with the intention of creating an "exciting up-tempo record for a female artist or group". The song demo was written and recorded in the UK, with Nina Woodford singing the vocal, and then finished and mixed in Denmark.

Their publisher, Pelle Lidell of Universal Music Publishing Group, successfully pitched the song to SM Entertainment for Girls' Generation. Jensen later told HitQuarters: "We knew it was a strong record and a lot of the time you have to be patient until you find the right artist to cut it at the right time. Girls' Generation were that match." The song was then translated into Korean, but incorporated some of the original English words such as "trouble, trouble, trouble". Rino Nakasone Razalan was the choreographer for the song.

== Music video ==
The music video contains two settings: a white room and a black room. Throughout the video, there are scenes of the girls dancing in the black room dressed in black short suits with pink belts and high boots and in the white room dressed in golden suits with silver boots, but also in the beginning the girls are seen dancing in an elevator. In the music video are individual close-ups of their own unique personality. The music video featured a parody of James Bond films' gun barrel sequence with a runtime of 34 seconds, and sampled Monty Norman & John Barry's score. The music video was released on October 28, 2010. A member of boy band Super Junior, Choi Siwon, appeared in the role of a Bond-like guy as a cameo. The video's runtime is 4:13.

== Live and performances ==
They held their comeback stage on October 29, 2010, on KBS's Music Bank. It was also performed on Show! Music Core, Inkigayo, and M! Countdown. They held their goodbye stage on December 4, 2010, on MBC's Show! Music Core.

== Accolades ==
According to a poll by Gallup Korea, "Hoot" was voted as the Song of the Year in South Korea in 2010. It won the Hot Trend award at the 2010 Melon Music Awards.

Music program awards
Program	Date
Music Bank	November 5, 2010
Music Bank	November 12, 2010
Music Bank	November 19, 2010
Music Bank	November 26, 2010
Music Bank	December 3, 2010
Inkigayo	November 7, 2010
Inkigayo	November 21, 2010
Inkigayo	November 28, 2010

== Credits ==
- Girls' Generation – Vocals
  - Taeyeon – main vocals, background vocals
  - Jessica – main vocals, background vocals
  - Sunny – vocals, background vocals
  - Tiffany – lead vocals, background vocals
  - Hyoyeon – vocals
  - Yuri – vocals
  - Sooyoung – vocals
  - Yoona – vocals
  - Seohyun – lead vocals

== Charts ==
=== Weekly chart ===
Chart (2010)	Peak position
South Korea (Gaon)	1

=== Year-end chart ===
Chart (2010)	Peak position
South Korea (Gaon)	10

=== Sales ===
Country	Sales
South Korea	2,138,179
