= Girls' Generation (2011 album) =

- Digital and regular edition cover

Studio album by Girls' Generation
- Released: June 1, 2011
- Recorded: August 2010 – March 2011
- Genre: Pop
- Length: 41:22
- Language: Japanese
- Label: Nayutawave

Girls' Generation chronology
Hoot (2010)	Girls' Generation (2011)	The Boys (2011)

The Boys repackage cover
- Digital and Regular CD-only edition cover

Singles from Girls' Generation
- 1. "Genie" Released: September 8, 2010; 2. "Gee" Released: October 20, 2010; 3. "Mr. Taxi / Run Devil Run" Released: April 27, 2011

Girls' Generation is the Japanese debut album and third album overall by South Korean girl group Girls' Generation, released by Nayutawave Records and Universal Music Japan on June 1, 2011. A repackaged edition of the album, The Boys, was released on December 28, 2011.

Girls' Generation experienced commercial success in Japan, peaking at number one on the Oricon album chart and was ranked the fifth best-selling album in the country during 2011. To promote the album, Girls' Generation embarked on their first Japan concert tour, The First Japan Arena Tour. Furthermore, the album ranked 18th on Spin magazine's list of the Top 20 Pop Albums of 2011.

With the aid of their repackaged album, the album has officially shipped over 1 million copies as of January 11, 2012. As of June 2012, the album has been "Million"-certified by the Recording Industry Association of Japan (RIAJ), making the group the second Korean artist and first Korean group to earn this achievement in Japan since Korean labelmate BoA's Best of Soul in 2005. According to Oricon, Girls' Generation has sold a total of 871,000 copies in the country.

== Background and release ==
After releasing three singles in the Japanese market, including "Genie", "Gee", and "Mr. Taxi/Run Devil Run", Girls' Generation released their first Japanese studio album Girls' Generation on June 1, 2011. A music video for the track "Bad Girl" was released on August 11. Other tracks in the album, "Mr. Taxi" and "Let It Rain", were used as the background music for various versions of Girls' Generation's CF with Lipton Tea. Girls' Generation became the highest earning foreign artist in Japan for the first half of 2011.

On December 28, the group released a repackaged version of the album, Re:package Album "Girls' Generation" ~The Boys~. It includes a Japanese version of their international hit "The Boys", and remixed versions of "The Great Escape", "Bad Girl", "Mr.Taxi", and a new song "Time Machine". A music video for "Time Machine" was released on March 13, 2012.

== Editions ==
The album was originally released in three different editions: Deluxe Limited First Press Edition, Limited Pressing Edition, and the Regular Edition. A repackaged Edition was released later. The Deluxe Limited First Press Edition comes with a bonus DVD featuring "Mr. Taxi"'s original and dance versions of the music video, plus "Genie" and "Gee" Japanese music videos, a 40-page photobook, a mini bag that comes in a special box. The Limited Pressing Edition comes in a slipcase with a 32-page photobook and a bonus DVD featuring the same contents at the Deluxe Limited First Press Edition except "Mr. Taxi"'s dance version. The Regular Edition comes in a standard jewel case with a lyrics-only booklet.

The album was later re-released as Re:package Album "Girls' Generation" ~The Boys~ was released in three editions: a Regular Edition with a lyrics-only booklet, a Limited Edition with a 36-page photobook, a bonus DVD featuring music videos of "Bad Girl" and "The Boys" (English Version) plus two rubber coasters and a Limited Pressing with the same photobook, bonus DVD and a case from the limited edition, but with two B2-size posters.

== Critical reception ==
Professional ratings
Review scores
Source	Rating
Spin	(positive)
Sputnikmusic	3.5/5 stars
Time Out	3/5 stars

Girls' Generation received mostly positive reviews from music critics. James Hadfield writing for the Japan edition of Time Out lauded it as a "cohesive" album and regarded the record as "far better than any of their Korean full-lengths". Hadfield also labelled Girls' Generation one of the best J-pop albums. Spin's editor Chuck Eddy picked "Bad Girl" as a highlight on the album, calling it "over-the-top" and "Latin-freestyle-emoted" track. Writing for the same magazine, Charles Aaron ranked Girls' Generation number 18 on Spin's list of 20 Best Pop Albums of 2011; he praised the record as a collection of "over terrifyingly sophisticated dance tracks" and chose "Run Devil Run" as a standout. An editor for Sputikmusic gave the record a favorable review, remarking that it is a "fairly unusual pop album" in the sense "that it is entirely devoid of filler", but opined that the songs were still a notch below "world class". It won Album of the Year and Best 3 Asian Albums at the 26th Japan Gold Disc Awards.

== Commercial performance ==
Pre-orders started on different e-stores. On Amazon Japan, the deluxe edition sold very well and rose quickly to No.1 on the pre-order chart while the limited edition was ranked 7th. On various, Japanese album stores, Girls' Generation was the No.1 pre-ordered album with over 300,000 units expected to be shipped.

The album topped the Oricon Daily Album Chart at first place on June 1 with a sales count of 74,000 copies, which made Girls' Generation the first foreign girl group ever to top the chart on the release date. According to Oricon, the album sold 232,000 copies in the first week and placed first on the Oricon Weekly Album Chart, surpassing the record for first week debut album sales for a foreign artist, a record previously held by SM Entertainment labelmate BoA's Listen to My Heart. One month after the album release, Oricon reported a total sales of 250,000 copies. The album placed second on the Oricon Monthly Album Chart for the month of June and became the 5th best selling album of 2011 in Japan according to the Oricon Album Rankings.

On December 19, 2011, Oricon reported that Girls' Generation sold over 642,054 copies in the 2011 calendar year to rank 5th place on the Oricon Yearly Album Chart. This surpassed the previous record of 7th place and 569,530 copies sold by SM Entertainment labelmate TVXQ's Best Selection 2010, and made Girls' Generation the highest selling album by a Korean group on Oricon at the time. On June 8, 2012, the RIAJ certified the album "Million" for shipping over a million copies.

The album placed 5th on the Oricon Weekly CD Albums chart for the second week of January 2012, and Oricon announced that it was the first time in history that an album by a Korean artist placed in the Top 10 for 17 weeks. The previous record holder was the original soundtrack for the Korean drama Winter Sonata, which remained in the Top 10 for 16 weeks.

== Singles ==
"Genie" is the official title for the debut in Japanese. The single was the first ever Japanese single released by Girls' Generation on September 8, 2010, in Japan. A new version of the music video was filmed to accompany the Japanese version, and the teaser was released on August 19, 2010. On August 26, 2010, the full music video was released. The song reached #5 on Oricon Charts on the releasing day. The song reached #2 on September 11, 2010. The song was released in three editions, two CD+DVD (first press and regular), and a CD Only edition. First press CD+DVD edition includes a special photobook and a random (1 of 9) photocard. The single includes also includes the Korean version, "Tell Me Your Wish (Genie)".

Girls' Generation also had success in Japan with their second Japanese single "Gee". They took second place and were crowned the first ever overseas girl group to reach number 1 on the chart. The song was ranked fifty-seventh on the Japan Hot 100 2010 year-end chart. On April 20, 2011, the girls added another accomplishment to their belt as the RIAJ (Recording Industry Association of Japan) website updated their charts showing that SNSD's Chaku Uta Full (ringtones) downloads for "Gee" went Double Platinum. The RIAJ certifies Platinum as moving 250,000 units, so Double Platinum would mean that the girls had over 500,000 downloads for "Gee".

"Mr. Taxi / Run Devil Run" set a new record for Girls' Generation, being their first Japanese single to shift 100,000 units in its first week of release. Before they released the physical single, they released the Japanese version of "Run Devil Run" as a digital single on January 25, 2011. The single also managed to clinch the number 1 spot on Billboard's Japan Hot 100 chart for two consecutive weeks. "Mr. Taxi" was first performed live on May 13, 2011, on TV Asahi's Music Station. On May 25, "Mr. Taxi" topped the Taiwanese music chart Gmusic.

== Promotion ==
It was announced on March 7, 2011, that Girls' Generation would embark on their first nationwide Japan tour starting May 18, 2011 at Yoyogi National Stadium in Tokyo, with a total of 7 stops in Tokyo, Nagoya, Osaka and Fukuoka. The start of the tour was postponed to May 31, 2011, because of the 2011 Tōhoku earthquake and tsunami. Due to overwhelming demand, with up to 300,000 applicants applying for tickets, additional stops were added to the tour. The tour was named as The First Japan Arena Tour.

== Track listing ==
Credits adapted from Naver

Girls' Generation
No.	Title	Lyrics	Music	Arrangement	Length
1.	"Mr. Taxi"	STY (Digz Inc.)	STY (Digz Inc.); Scott Mann (Echo Brothers); Chad Royce (Echo Brothers)	STY (Digz Inc.); Echo Brothers; Paolo Prudencio; Allison Veltz	3:33
2.	"Genie" (Japanese version)	Kanata Nakamura; Yoo Young-jin	Anne Judith Stokke Wik; Robin Jenssen; Ronny Vidar Svendsen; Nermin Harambašić; Fridolin Nordsø; Yoo Young-jin	Yoo Han-jin	3:42
3.	"You-aholic"	STY (Digz Inc.)	STY (Digz Inc.); Lindy Robbins; E. Kidd Bogart; Greg Ogan; Spencer Nezey (Digz Inc.)	STY (Digz Inc.); Lindy Robbins; E. Kidd Bogart; Greg Ogan; Spencer Nezey (Digz Inc.)	3:29
4.	"Run Devil Run" (Japanese version)	Kanata Nakamura; Hong Ji-Yoo	Michael Busbee; Alex James (Alex Read); Kalle Engström	Michael Busbee; Alex James (Alex Read); Kalle Engström	3:21
5.	"Bad Girl"	Hiro (Digz Inc.)	Hiro (Digz Inc.); Jörgen Elofsson; Jesper Jakobson; Lauren Dyson	Hiro (Digz Inc.); Jörgen Elofsson; Jesper Jakobson; Lauren Dyson	3:44
6.	"Beautiful Stranger"	Hiro (Digz Inc.)	Hiro (Digz Inc.); Leah Haywood; Daniel James; Carl Sturken; Evan Rogers	Hiro (Digz Inc.); Leah Haywood; Daniel James; Carl Sturken and Evan Rogers	2:42
7.	"I'm in Love with the Hero"	Kanata Nakamura	Leah Haywood; Daniel James; Kevin Christopher Ross; Bret Carlson Puchir	Leah Haywood; Daniel James; Kevin Christopher Ross; Bret Carlson Puchir	2:48
8.	"Let It Rain"	Hiro (Digz Inc.)	Hiro (Digz Inc.); Andy Love; Robert "Deadbeat" Habolin	Hiro (Digz Inc.); Andy Love; Robert "Deadbeat" Habolin	3:40
9.	"Gee" (Japanese version)	Kanata Nakamura; Kim Young-deux; Ahn Myung-won	Kim Young-deux; Ahn Myung-won	E-Tribe	3:21
10.	"The Great Escape"	STY (Digz Inc.)	STY (Digz Inc.); Andre Merritt; E. Kidd Bogart; Greg Ogan; Spencer Nezey (Digz Inc.)	STY (Digz Inc.); Andre Merritt; E. Kidd Bogart; Greg Ogan; Spencer Nezey (Digz Inc.)	3:49
11.	"Hoot" (Japanese version)	Kanata Nakamura; John Hyunkyu Lee	Alex James (Alex Read); Lars Halvor Jensen; Martin Michael Larsson	Alex James (Alex Read); Lars Halvor Jensen; Martin Michael Larsson	3:17
12.	"Born to Be a Lady"	Kanata Nakamura	Leah Haywood; Daniel James; Shelly Peiken	Shelly Peiken	3:56
Total length:					41:22

Re:package Album "Girls' Generation" ~The Boys~ (CD)
No.	Title	Lyrics	Music	Arrangement	Length
1.	"The Boys" (Japanese version)	Hidenori Tanaka (agehasprings); Maezawa Nozomi (agehasprings); Tiffany; Yoo Young-jin; Taesung Kim (Iconic Sounds); Teddy Riley	Taesung Kim (Iconic Sounds); Teddy Riley; Dominique "DOM" Rodriguez (Audity); Richard Garcia (Audity)	Taesung Kim (Iconic Sounds); Teddy Riley; Dominique "DOM" Rodriguez (Audity); Richard Garcia (Audity)	3:51
2.	"The Great Escape" (Brian Lee remix)	STY (Digz Inc.)	STY (Digz Inc.); Andre Merritt; E. Kidd Bogart; Greg Ogan; Spencer Nezey (Digz Inc.)	Brian Lee; STY (Digz Inc.); Andre Merritt; E. Kidd Bogart; Greg Ogan; Spencer Nezey (Digz Inc.)	4:57
3.	"Bad Girl" (The Cataracs remix – featuring Dev)	Hiro (Digz Inc.)	Hiro (Digz Inc.); Jörgen Elofsson; Jesper Jakobson; Lauren Dyson	The Cataracs; Hiro (Digz Inc.); Jörgen Elofsson; Jesper Jakobson; Lauren Dyson	4:30
4.	"Time Machine"	Hiro (Digz Inc.)	Hiro (Digz Inc.); Andy Love; Robert "Deadbeat" Habolin; Marlene Strand	Hiro (Digz Inc.); Andy Love; Robert "Deadbeat" Habolin; Marlene Strand	3:58
5.	"Mr. Taxi"	STY (Digz Inc.)	STY (Digz Inc.); Scott Mann (Echo Brothers); Chad Royce (Echo Brothers)	STY (Digz Inc.); Echo Brothers; Paolo Prudencio; Allison Veltz	3:33
6.	"Genie" (Japanese version)	Kanata Nakamura; Yoo Young-jin	Anne Judith Stokke Wik; Robin Jenssen; Ronny Vidar Svendsen; Nermin Harambašić; Fridolin Nordsø; Yoo Young-jin	Yoo Han-jin	3:42
7.	"Gee" (Japanese version)	Kanata Nakamura; Kim Young-deux; Ahn Myung-won	Kim Young-deux; Ahn Myung-won	E-Tribe	3:21
8.	"I'm in Love with the Hero"	Kanata Nakamura	Leah Haywood; Daniel James; Kevin Christopher Ross; Bret Carlson Puchir	Leah Haywood; Daniel James; Kevin Christopher Ross; Bret Carlson Puchir	2:48
9.	"Hoot" (Japanese version)	Kanata Nakamura; John Hyunkyu Lee	Alex James (Alex Read); Lars Halvor Jensen; Martin Michael Larsson	Alex James (Alex Read); Lars Halvor Jensen; Martin Michael Larsson	3:17
10.	"Let It Rain"	Hiro (Digz Inc.)	Hiro (Digz Inc.); Andy Love; Robert "Deadbeat" Habolin	Hiro (Digz Inc.); Andy Love; Robert "Deadbeat" Habolin	3:40
11.	"Beautiful Stranger"	Hiro (Digz Inc.)	Hiro (Digz Inc.); Leah Haywood; Daniel James; Carl Sturken; Evan Rogers	Hiro (Digz Inc.); Leah Haywood; Daniel James; Carl Sturken and Evan Rogers	2:42
12.	"You-aholic"	STY (Digz Inc.)	STY (Digz Inc.); Lindy Robbins; E. Kidd Bogart; Greg Ogan; Spencer Nezey (Digz Inc.)	STY (Digz Inc.); Lindy Robbins; E. Kidd Bogart; Greg Ogan; Spencer Nezey (Digz Inc.)	3:29
13.	"Run Devil Run" (Japanese version)	Kanata Nakamura; Hong Ji-Yoo	Michael Busbee; Alex James (Alex Read); Kalle Engström	Michael Busbee; Alex James (Alex Read); Kalle Engström	3:21
14.	"Born to Be a Lady"	Kanata Nakamura	Leah Haywood; Daniel James; Shelly Peiken	Shelly Peiken	3:56
15.	"Mr. Taxi" (Steve Aoki remix)	STY (Digz Inc.)	STY (Digz Inc.); Scott Mann (Echo Brothers); Chad Royce (Echo Brothers)	Steve Aoki; STY (Digz Inc.); Echo Brothers; Paolo Prudencio; Allison Veltz	5:08
Total length:					56:13

Girls' Generation DVD (Limited Period Edition)
No.	Title	Length
1.	"Mr. Taxi" (Original version)
2.	"Genie" (Japanese original version)
3.	"Gee" (Japanese original version)

Girls' Generation DVD (Deluxe First Press Edition)
No.	Title	Length
1.	"Mr. Taxi" (Original version)
2.	"Mr. Taxi" (Dance version)
3.	"Genie" (Japanese original version)
4.	"Gee" (Japanese original version)

Re:package Album "Girls' Generation" ~The Boys~ (DVD)
No.	Title	Length
1.	"The Boys" (English version)
2.	"Bad Girl"

== Charts ==
=== Weekly charts ===
Chart (2011)	Peak position
Japanese Albums (Oricon)	1
Japanese Top Albums (Billboard)	1
Taiwanese Albums (G-Music)	1

Chart (2012)	Peak position
Japanese Albums (Oricon)	2
Japanese Top Albums (Billboard) Reissue The Boys	5
South Korea (Gaon) Reissue The Boys	62

=== Year-end charts ===
Chart (2011)	Position
Japanese Albums (Oricon)	5
Japanese Top Albums (Billboard)	3

Chart (2012)	Position
Japanese Albums (Oricon)	25
Japanese Top Albums (Billboard)	89
Japanese Top Albums (Billboard) Reissue The Boys	65
South Korea (Gaon) Reissue The Boys	95

== Certifications ==
Region	Certification	Certified units/sales
Japan (RIAJ)	Million	871,000

== Release history ==
Region	Date	Format	Edition	Distributor	Ref.
Japan	June 1, 2011	CD	Standard	Nayutawave Records	
Japan	June 1, 2011	CD+DVD	Standard	Nayutawave Records	
Japan	June 1, 2011	Digital download	Standard	Nayutawave Records	
South Korea	July 13, 2011	CD	Standard	SM Entertainment	
Japan	December 28, 2011	CD	Reissue (titled The Boys)	Nayutawave Records	
Japan	December 28, 2011	CD+DVD	Reissue (titled The Boys)	Nayutawave Records	
