= Run Devil Run (Girls' Generation song) =

Single by Girls' Generation

from the album Run Devil Run and Girls' Generation
- A-side: "Mr. Taxi (JP)"
- Released: March 17, 2010; January 25, 2011 (Japan)
- Genre: Electropop
- Length: 3:21
- Label: SM, Nayutawave
- Composers: Busbee; Alex James; Kalle Engstrom
- Lyricists: Hong Ji-yu; Kanata Nakamura (JP)

Girls' Generation singles chronology
"Hoot" (2010)	"Run Devil Run" (2010)	"The Boys" (2011)

Japanese singles chronology
"Oh!" (2010)	"Mr. Taxi / Run Devil Run" (2010)	"Genie" (2010)

Audio sample
- "Run Devil Run": file; help

Music video
- "Run Devil Run" on YouTube

"Run Devil Run" is a song by South Korean girl group Girls' Generation. The original Korean version was released on March 17, 2010, as a single from Run Devil Run (2010), the reissue of their 2010 studio album Oh!. A Japanese version was released digitally on January 25, 2011, by Nayutawave Records, and was later released as a double A-side single with "Mr. Taxi" on April 23, 2011, as the third single from their Japanese self-titled debut studio album.

== Background and release ==
"Run Devil Run" was written by Alex James, Busbee, and Kalle Engström. In 2008, American singer Kesha provided the vocals for the demo of the song which has been leaked online. The song was pitched to SM Entertainment for Girls' Generation. The song is an electro pop song, with horn synths in the background, and strong harmonies. It is a strong conical departure from the group's usual musical style until that point. It has been noted to use the schaffel beat. In 2011, Girls' Generation recorded a Japanese version of "Run Devil Run", which was released as a double A-side with "Mr. Taxi".

== Reception ==
Seong Won-ho of IZM gave the song 1 stars out of 5, where he felt that the translated lyrical content and the group's vocal performance were a downgrade from the original version by Kesha. Commercially, "Run Devil Run" peaked at number one on the Gaon Digital Chart for two weeks. It was certified gold by the Recording Industry Association of Japan (RIAJ) in ringtone downloads in May 2011.

== Music videos ==
The music video for "Run Devil Run" was released on March 18. They also released a story version on March 31, 2010. The original video contains two settings: a white room and a black room. Throughout the video, there are scenes of the girls dancing in these rooms, and there are individual close-ups of their own unique Black SoShi looks. At the end of the video, the girls are shown in the black room, after which the video ends similar to a TV shutting off.

=== Story version ===
The story version is similar to the original version, with the two rooms where the girls are dancing, and there individual close-ups in their Black SoShi looks, but the overall video is different, with a tie-in with the video of the group's song "Oh!". In the beginning of the video, it shows the mishandled helmet spill a cup, which damages a computer monitor, causing the Black SoShi to emerge from the monitor and into the girls' room and begin making a mess of it. Soon, the girls meet the Black SoShi, and after an encounter with them, Yuri pulls the plug from the monitor to its outlet, turning off the monitor and causing the Black SoShi to disappear. When the girls are cleaning up the room, one of them touches the monitor, and it shows the Black SoShi.

=== Japanese version videos ===
On April 8, 2011, the teaser video for a Japanese version of "Run Devil Run" was released and the full video the following day. On April 25, 2011, a dance version was released. Lisette Bustamante provided choreography for the videos. The video is similar to the Korean version, except for altered dance moves and outfits. The music video begins with a blue room, after, it was changed to white, with the members dancing, in white outfits, like the Korean version, Then, changes the scenes, to a blue room what shows the girls dancing in blue outfits, the girls can be shown wearing different "Black SoShi" outfits. The first of two settings used in the music video is a white room with the members in white outfits. At the first chorus, glimpses of the second setting, a dark room with the members in fitting outfits, are shown. During the second chorus full scenes in this setting are shown.

== Promotion ==
On March 11, 2010, photos of the members were started being released online showcasing a dark concept, the so-called Black SoShi. In the run of promotions for the song, an official iPhone application was released, available in free and paid versions. The free version has 30-second previews for all the songs on the album, a music video for "Run Devil Run" and a few photographs. The paid version has full tracks for all the songs on the album, music videos for "Run Devil Run", "Gee", "Oh!" and "Tell Me Your Wish (Genie)", and a photo gallery. They concluded their song promotions by May 2, 2010, in SBS's Inkigayo. In Japan, "Run Devil Run" was first performed on Music Station on January 28, 2011.

== Accolades ==
Its first number one on network television was on KBS's Music Bank, where it won over Kara's "Lupin" and 2AM's "I Was Wrong".

Music program awards
Program	Date	Ref.
Music Bank	April 2, 2010	
Music Bank	April 9, 2010	
Inkigayo	April 4, 2010	
Inkigayo	April 11, 2010	

== Credits and personnel ==
Credits are adapted from Run Devil Run liner notes. The Japanese version credits are adapted from "Mr. Taxi / Run Devil Run" liner notes.

- Girls' Generation – Vocals
  - Taeyeon – Main vocals, Background vocals
  - Jessica – Main vocals, Background vocals
  - Sunny – Vocals, Background vocals, Main Raps
  - Tiffany – Lead vocals, Background vocals
  - Hyoyeon – Vocals, Main Raps
  - Yuri – Lead Vocals
  - Sooyoung – Vocals, Raps
  - Yoona – Vocals
  - Seohyun – Main vocals, Background vocals
- Hong Ji-yoo – Lyrics (Korean version)
- Kanata Nakamura – Lyrics (Japanese version)
- Kenzie – vocal direction
- Lee Seong Ho – recording engineer
- Nam Koong Jin – mixing engineer
- Michael Busbee – songwriting
- Alex James – songwriting
- Kalle Engström – songwriting
- Jeon Hoon – mastering engineer

== Charts ==
=== Korean version ===
Weekly charts
Chart (2010)	Peak position
South Korea (Gaon)	1

Year-end charts
Chart (2010)	Position
South Korea (Gaon)	25

=== Japanese version ===
Weekly charts
Chart (2011)	Peak position
Japan (Oricon) (Note: Credited as "Mr. Taxi / Run Devil Run")	2
Japan (Japan Hot 100)	19
Japan (RIAJ Digital Track Chart)	4
South Korean Albums (Gaon)	1

== Certifications and sales ==
Region	Certification	Certified units/sales
Japan (RIAJ) Full-length ringtone	Gold	100,000^{*}
South Korea Korean ver.	—	2,171,755
^{*} Sales figures based on certification alone.

== Release history ==
Country	Release date	Format	Distributor
South Korea	March 17, 2010	Digital download	S.M. Entertainment
Japan	January 25, 2011	Digital download	Nayutawave Records, Universal Music Japan
Japan	April 27, 2011	CD + DVD (double A-side single with "Mr. Taxi")	Nayutawave Records, Universal Music Japan

== Footnotes ==
Notes
