= MTV K =

2006–2015 American K-pop platform

MTV K was an English-language online media hub under the MTV brand that focused on K-pop music for a global audience. Owned and operated by parent company Viacom Media Networks, MTV K was based out of New York City and provided original media content including music video playlists, live performances, editorial, and other exclusive content in multiple languages.

MTV K first launched in 2006 as a television channel on DirecTV and was reformatted to online content in 2010. MTV K went silent around 2015.

== Television channel ==
MTV K launched as a DirecTV premium channel that launched on June 27, 2006, as the newest brand under the MTV World banner after MTV Chi and MTV Desi (for Chinese and South Asian/Desi-Americans, respectively). It showcased the best of Korean pop culture while also providing a platform for Korean-American talent. The target audience primarily consisted of Korean-Americans, Asian-Americans and K-pop lovers. Viewer-voted music video "My Name" by K-pop sensation BoA was the first video content to air on the channel.

After going off the air on April 30, 2007, MTV K made the shift to exclusively online content in 2010, focusing on original K-pop programming, music videos and editorial targeted for international fans of Korean pop music.

== MTV K Presents... Live in NYC ==
MTV K hosted several major K-pop artists in the iconic MTV Times Square studio, including Rain, Se7en, YG Family, Wonder Girls, 2PM, 4Minute, Beast, and B.A.P. The shows were formatted in the TRL-style with live performances, MV clips, and audience interaction.

MTV K Presents B.A.P Live in New York City started the next generation of K-pop consumption in the United States by providing a live stream of the three performances on MTVK.com during the event.

== 2013 relaunch ==
In April 2013, MTV K announced that the site was planning a major revamp to bring more exclusive content than ever. A "brand new MTV K" is expected to available in late 2013.

== See also ==
- Korean Wave
