= Oh! (Girls' Generation song) =

- Japanese version cover

Single by Girls' Generation

from the album Oh! and Girls & Peace
- B-side: "All My Love Is for You"
- Released: January 25, 2010; September 26, 2012 (Japan)
- Genre: Bubblegum pop
- Length: 3:08
- Label: SM; Nayutawave
- Composer: Kenzie
- Lyricists: Kim Young-hoo, Kim Jeong-bae; Nozomi Maezawa (JP)

Girls' Generation singles chronology
"Tell Me Your Wish (Genie)" (2009)	"Oh!" (2010)	"Run Devil Run" (2010)

Japanese singles chronology
"Paparazzi" (2012)	"Oh!" (2012)	"Flower Power" (2012)

Audio sample
- file; help

Music video
- "Oh!" on YouTube

"Oh!" is a song by South Korean girl group Girls' Generation. The song is a lead single from the second studio album of the same name and was digitally released on January 25, 2010. The group used a cheerleader concept for the song's promotional activities. The song reached number one on the Gaon Digital Chart and won several times on the Korean music chart shows Music Bank and Inkigayo. The song ranked at number five on the year-end Gaon Digital Chart for 2010 and was also the second best selling single of the year, selling over 3.3 million copies. Music site Monkey3 named "Oh!" the best song in 2010.

"Oh!" was remade as a Japanese song for the group's second single from their second Japanese album Girls & Peace. It was their fifth Japanese single. The music video for "Oh!" was released on September 14, 2012. Promotion for the single began on Hey! Hey! Hey! Music Champ. The single ranked highly among Japanese music charts, clinching the top spot on the Oricon Daily and Weekly single chart as well as the top spot on the Japan Hot 100. The single was released with the song, "All My Love Is for You", on September 26, 2012, with an accompanying music video premiering on September 14, 2012.

== Background and release ==
=== Korean version ===
Kenzie, a songwriter who previously composed the group's debut single "Into the New World", also composed "Oh!". It was released to digital music sites on January 25, 2010. The song quickly topped various digital music charts within 10 minutes of release. Moreover, the song reached No. 1 on Gaon Music Chart.

=== Japanese version ===
On August 10, 2012, it was announced the group was to release their next Japanese single after the success of their previous single "Paparazzi", in the following month on September 26, 2012. The single was announced with no confirmation of title tracks, however fans were allowed to pre-order the regular, and limited editions of the single. After several weeks of speculation, the single's title track, a Japanese remake of the group's popular 2010 Korean hit, "Oh!" was finally announced on September 10. The accompanying music video to "Oh!" was released on September 14, 2012, along with an exclusive ringtone which was released at 5AM JST.

== Music video ==
=== Korean version ===
The group worked with long-time collaborator Rino Nakasone Razalan, whom they had previously worked on for the group's previous single, "Tell Me Your Wish (Genie)" on the choreography for "Oh!", and director Cheo Soo-hyun. A teaser video was released to various websites on January 23, 2010, causing at least one of them – Naver – to be overwhelmed by high visitor traffic. The full video was released on January 26, 2010. Eventually, the dance version of "Oh!" was released on S.M. Entertainment's YouTube channel. As of December 2016, the song's official music video has attracted over 100 million views on YouTube, becoming the group's fifth music video to do so following "Gee", "I Got A Boy", "The Boys", and "Mr. Taxi".

The girls wear specific numbers in the music video; each number was personally chosen by the members. In the story version, it is shown that they were cheerleaders for an American football team. In the middle of the video, Sooyoung mishandles an American football helmet (turns out to be a University of Iowa Hawkeyes football helmet from the Big Ten Conference) causing the computer monitor to be damaged. At the end of the video, the girls meet the Black SoShi, their malevolent selves from a parallel universe. (It's later revealed through their "Run Devil Run" story video that the Black SoShi emerged from inside the monitor after it was struck by the helmet.)

=== Japanese version ===
The Japanese version of "Oh!" was released on September 14, 2012. A dance version for "Oh!" was released on September 18, 2012. The "Oh!" video shares similarities with its Korean counterpart, however, instead of being a high school-oriented video, the video is shot as if the girls have now entered college, implying their growth as artists and women. The video begins with the camera panning through their college dorm, all of the members are seen reading, except for Jessica who is playing the ukulele, Hyoyeon and Seohyun who are playing rock-paper-scissors. The camera then focuses on a cheerleading jacket with "Girls' Generation" written on it, as well as a football helmet with "GG" written on the side and a decorated cake with "Oh!" written in decorative writing. It then cuts to Tiffany, who says "Go!" and the girls quickly file out into a red-colored changing room where they begin to sing and dance. The video cuts between this and a stadium setting where the group perform as cheerleaders, as well as solo shots of each of the individual members dressed in their cheerleading uniforms. The video ends with the girls entering back into their dorm, taking off their blue cheer jackets. Taeyeon walks towards the camera with her jacket and puts the jacket over it. The final scene is the girls' empty dorm with the camera focusing on a picture on the wall of the group.

== Commercial performance ==
"Oh!" continued the success of its predecessor and ranked highly on Japanese music charts, after ranking first on the Top Songs and Top Singles on the Japanese iTunes store, the single managed to clench the top spot on Oricon's Daily Single chart, where it sold close to 30,000 in its first day, with 29,666 copies sold. After a strong first day of sales, the single debuted atop Oricon's Weekly Single chart, selling 66,000 copies in its first week. Despite only having a week of sales, "Oh!" managed to peak inside the top 10 at No. 8 on Oricon's Monthly Single chart. The single managed to reach the top spot on Billboard Japan's Hot 100 and Hot Single Sales. However, fairing less well on radio, with the single only peaking at No. 27 on Top Airplay chart, and #38 on the Adult Contemporary Airplay chart.

== Promotion ==
=== Korean version ===
The song was first performed live on January 30, 2010, on MBC's Music Core, as part of their Comeback Stage. However, there was a technical error in MBC's broadcast, with 7 seconds of dead air near the end of the performance; the network was subsequently flooded with complaints. The incident was then parodied on YouTube, mixing in clips of the Korean drama IRIS, receiving attention from Korean netizens. The group followed up with their second performance on Inkigayo the following day. On their first Music Bank comeback stage, they won the "K-Chart!", beating CNBLUE and 2AM while at the same time breaking the record for the most points on the chart with 23,077 points.

=== Japanese version ===
The group was set to perform the single for the first time on September 24, 2012, on Fuji TV’s Hey! Hey! Hey! Music Champ, which marked their sixth appearance on the show. The group donned pink cheerleading outfits, with knee high boots for the performance of "Oh!" as well as a special performance of "Mr. Taxi". The group also participated in a "Special Program" in anticipation of the single's release, with three Japanese music websites airing performances of the single across three consecutive nights; September 25, 26 and 27. On September 29, the group performed "Oh!" on Count Down TV, dressed in white cheerleading uniforms. The group pre-recorded a performance for NHK-TV's Music Japan prior to the single's release and was scheduled to be broadcast on September 30, however due to a typhoon, the broadcast was delayed. The performance was shown on October 6, with the group performing in blue cheerleading outfits. Promotion for the single continued on Nippon Television’s “Music Lovers", where the group recorded a performance on September 25 for the show that was broadcast on October 8, 2012. The group performed "Oh!", "All My Love Is for You" and "Mr. Taxi".

== Accolades ==
Awards and nominations
Year	Organization	Award	Result	Ref.
2010	Bugs Music Awards	Song of the Year	Won	
2010	Bugs Music Awards	Music Video of the Year	Won	
2010	Golden Disc Awards	Digital Song Bonsang	Nominated	
2010	KBS Song Festival	Song of the Year	Won	
2010	Melon Music Awards	Song of the Year	Nominated	
2010	Melon Music Awards	Netizen Popular Song	Nominated	
2010	Melon Music Awards	Best Music Video	Nominated	

Music program awards
Program	Date	Ref.
Music Bank	February 5, 2010	
Music Bank	February 12, 2010	
Music Bank	February 19, 2010	
Music Bank	February 26, 2010	
Music Bank	March 5, 2010	
Music Bank	June 25, 2010	
Music Bank	December 17, 2010	
Inkigayo	February 14, 2010	
Inkigayo	February 21, 2010	
Inkigayo	February 28, 2010	

== Track listing ==
Regular edition CD and Digital download
No.	Title	Lyrics	Music	Arrangement	Length
1.	"Oh!" (Japanese version)	Nozomi Maezawa	Kenzie	Kenzie	3:12
2.	"All My Love Is for You"	Junji Ishiwatari	Sebastian Thott; Didrik Thott; Robin Lerner	Sebastian Thott	3:44
Total length:					6:57

Limited edition CD+DVD
No.	Title	Lyrics	Music	Arrangement	Length
1.	"Oh!" (Japanese version)	Nozomi Maezawa	Kenzie	Kenzie	3:12
2.	"All My Love Is for You"	Junji Ishiwatari	Sebastian Thott; Didrik Thott; Robin Lerner	Sebastian Thott	3:44
3.	"All My Love Is for You" (music video)				4:06

== Credits and personnel ==
Credits adapted from album's liner notes.

=== Studio ===
==== Oh! ====
- SM Blue Ocean Studio – recording
- SM Concert Hall Studio – mixing, digital editing
- Sonic Korea – mastering

==== All My Love is For You ====
- Ingrid Studio – recording, digital editing
- Parhelion Studio – mixing
- Sterling Sound – mastering

=== Personnel ===
==== Oh! ====
- SM Entertainment – executive producer
- Lee Soo-man – producer
- Girls' Generation – vocals, background vocals
- Kim Young-hoo – Korean lyrics
- Kim Jeong-bae – Korean lyrics
- Kenzie – producer, composition, arrangement, vocal directing, recording
- Nozomi Maezawa – Japanese lyrics
- Lee Seong-ho – recording
- Nam Koong-jin – mixing, digital editing
- Jeon Hoon – mastering

==== All My Love is For You ====
- SM Entertainment – executive producer
- Nozomu Tsuchiya – producer
- Girls' Generation – vocals, background vocals
- Junji Ishiwatari – lyrics
- Sebastian Thott – composition, arrangement
- Didrik Thott – composition
- Robin Lerner – composition
- Kim Jin-hwan – vocal directing
- Jung Eun-kyung – recording, digital editing
- Miles Walker – mixing
- Tom Coyne – mastering

== Charts ==
=== Weekly charts ===
Chart (2010–12) (Note: The chart positions in Japan are based on the Japanese version of "Oh!", released in 2012.)	Peak position
Japan (Japan Hot 100)	1
Japan (Oricon)	1
Japan Adult Contemporary (Billboard)	14
South Korea (Gaon)	1

=== Year-end charts ===
Chart (2010)	Position
South Korea (Gaon)	5
Taiwan (Hito Radio)	19
Chart (2012)	Position
Japan (Oricon)	92

== Certifications ==
Region	Certification	Certified units/sales
Japan (RIAJ) Japanese version (physical)	Gold	100,000^{^}
Japan (RIAJ) Japanese version (digital)	Gold	100,000^{*}
South Korea) Korean version	—	3,316,889
^{^} Shipments figures based on certification alone.

== Release history ==
Region	Date	Version	Format	Distributor
South Korea	January 25, 2010	Korean version	Digital download	SM Entertainment, KMP Holdings
Japan	September 26, 2012	Japanese version	Digital download, CD	Universal Music, Nayutawave Records
Worldwide	September 26, 2012	Japanese version	Digital download	Universal Music
Taiwan	October 5, 2012	Japanese version	CD	Universal Music Taiwan
