= Paparazzi (Girls' Generation song) =

- Digital and CD-only edition cover.

Single by Girls' Generation

from the album Girls & Peace
- Language: Japanese
- Released: June 27, 2012
- Recorded: 2012
- Genre: Electropop; R&B
- Length: 3:47
- Label: Nayutawave
- Songwriters: Fredrik Thomander; Johan Becker; Junji Ishiwatari
- Producer: Miles Walker

Girls' Generation singles chronology
"The Boys" (2011)	"Paparazzi" (2012)	"Oh!" (2012)

Music video
- "Paparazzi" on YouTube

"Paparazzi" is a song recorded in the Japanese language by South Korean girl group Girls' Generation for their second Japanese-language studio album, Girls & Peace (2012). It was released as the album's lead single on June 27, 2012. Written by Fredrik Thomander, Johan Becker, and Junji Ishiwatari, and produced by Miles Walker, the track was described as an electropop and R&B song. To promote the single, Girls' Generation appeared on Japanese music programs Music Station and Hey! Hey! Hey! Music Champ, while a music video for the song directed by Toshiyuki Suzuki premiered on June 10, 2012, to accompany the release of the song.

Upon its release, "Paparazzi" received mixed reviews from music critics, who compared the song to the group's previous Japanese-language single "Mr. Taxi" in 2011. The track was ranked number 19 on Spin's list of top 20 K-pop songs of 2012. The single was a commercial success in Japan, peaking atop the Japan Hot 100 and at number two on both the Oricon Singles Chart and RIAJ Digital Track Chart. "Paparazzi" was certified Gold in Japan for the sales of the single's digital and physical release, respectively.

== Recording and release ==
"Paparazzi" is a song recorded in the Japanese language, which was described as a hybrid of electropop and R&B. It was written by Swedish songwriters Fredrik Thomander and Johan Becker, while production was handled by American producer Miles Walker. Japanese songwriter Junji Ishiwatari provided additional writing credits. The track was released as the lead single from the group's second Japanese-language studio album, Girls & Peace (2012), as part of the group's comeback to Japanese promotions. It was released for CD and DVD sales in Japan by Nayutawave Records, which is affiliated with Universal Music Group, on June 27, 2012. The song was made available for digital purchase globally on the same day. "Paparazzi" was also released in Hong Kong, Taiwan, and South Korea in mid-2012 under license by Universal Music Hong Kong, Universal Music Taiwan, and S.M. Entertainment, respectively.

== Promotion ==
To promote the single, Girls' Generation performed "Paparazzi" on the Japanese music program Music Station on June 22, 2012, where the group wore tuxedos and pink gloves. On July 9, 2012, the group staged their second performance of the song on Fuji Television's Hey! Hey! Hey! Music Champ, where the members wore tuxedos with black gloves. The accompanying music video for "Paparazzi" was directed by Toshiyuki Suzuki and is almost seven minutes long. In the video, Girls' Generation performs on stage in a theatre, with the set inspired by classic musicals. The video begins with the members wearing trench coats and "whimsically prancing" to Gene Kelly's "Singin' in the Rain". During the main performance of "Paparazzi", the video is intercut with scenes of the members being followed by photographers. They perform in two different outfits – showgirl-inspired costumes and tuxedos with pink gloves. Jeff Benjamin from Billboard praised the dance routines for their "perfect nine-piece synchronization" and opined that the pink gloves of the girls resembled those worn by Marilyn Monroe.

== Reception ==
"Paparazzi"
A 22-second sample of "Paparazzi", an electropop and R&B song which music critics compared to the band's previous single, "Mr. Taxi" (2011).

Upon its release, "Paparazzi" received mixed reviews from music critics. Jeff Benjamin from Billboard named it a "high-energy" track. James Hadfield, writing for the Tokyo edition of Time Out, compared the song's R&B styles to those of the group's previous 2011 Japanese-language single "Mr. Taxi" and called it a "redux" of the latter single, writing that "you'd struggle to spot many real improvements."

"Paparazzi" was a commercial success in Japan, debuting at number two on the Oricon Singles Chart on the chart issue dated July 9, 2012; the number one position belonged to KAT-TUN's single "To the Limit". The following week, it dropped to number ten. "Paparazzi" became the 58th best-selling physical single of 2012 on the Oricon chart, selling 136,181 copies.

The single debuted at number 31 on the Billboard Japan Hot 100 on July 2, 2012. The following week, it rose up to the top position on the chart. On the chart issue dated July 16, 2012, the single dropped to number seven. "Paparazzi" ranked at number 50 on the year-end chart of 2012. The track as well charted at number two on the Billboard Japan Hot Singles Sales, number five on the Billboard Japan Adult Contemporary Airplay, and number two on the RIAJ Digital Track Chart. According to Nielsen SoundScan, "Paparazzi" has sold 103,000 digital copies in Japan as of July 2012.

== Track listing ==
Digital Download

1. "Paparazzi" – 3:47
2. "Paparazzi" (Instrumental) – 3:46

Regular Edition CD single – Type A

1. "Paparazzi"
2. "Paparazzi" (Instrumental)
3. "Paparazzi" (Music Video)

Regular Edition CD Single – Type B

1. "Paparazzi"
2. "Paparazzi" (Instrumental)

Special Edition

1. "Paparazzi"
2. "Paparazzi" (Instrumental)
3. "Paparazzi" (Music Video)
4. "Paparazzi" (Music Video: close-up version)

== Credits and personnel ==
Credits adapted from the CD issue's liner notes

- Girls' Generation – Vocals
  - Taeyeon – Main vocals, Background vocals
  - Jessica – Main vocals, Background vocals
  - Sunny – Lead vocals
  - Tiffany – Lead vocals
  - Hyoyeon – Vocals
  - Yuri – Lead vocals
  - Sooyoung – Vocals
  - Yoona – Vocals
  - Seohyun – Lead vocals, Background vocals
- Miles Walker – producer, mixing and programming
- Fredrik Thomander – songwriter
- Johan Becker – songwriter
- Junji Ishiwatari – songwriter, translation
- Tom Coyne – mastering

== Charts ==
=== Weekly charts ===
Chart (2012)	Peak position
Billboard Japan Hot 100	1
Japanese Oricon Singles Chart	2
Japanese RIAJ Digital Track Chart	2
South Korean Gaon Album Chart	1
US World Digital Songs (Billboard)	20

=== Year-end charts ===
Chart (2012)	Position
Billboard Japan Hot 100	50
Japanese Oricon Singles Chart	58
South Korean Gaon International Albums	4

== Sales and certifications ==
Region	Certification	Certified units/sales
Japan (RIAJ) physical single	Gold	100,000^{^}
Japan (RIAJ) digital download	Gold	100,000^{*}
South Korea	—	14,663
^{*} Sales figures based on certification alone.^{^} Shipments figures based on certification alone.

== Release history ==
Region	Date	Format	Label
Worldwide	June 27, 2012	Digital download	Nayutawave Records
Japan	June 27, 2012	CD	Nayutawave Records, Universal Music Japan
Japan	June 27, 2012	CD + DVD	Nayutawave Records, Universal Music Japan
Hong Kong	July 11, 2012	CD	Universal Music Hong Kong
Taiwan	July 13, 2012	CD	Universal Music Taiwan
South Korea	August 16, 2012	CD + DVD	S.M. Entertainment
