= Mr. Taxi =

- Digital and CD-only edition cover.

Single by Girls' Generation

from the album Girls' Generation and The Boys
- A-side: "Run Devil Run"
- Released: April 23, 2011
- Recorded: 2010
- Genre: Electropop; R&B
- Length: 3:32
- Label: Nayutawave Records; S.M. Entertainment
- Composers: STY; Chad Royce; Scott Mann
- Lyricists: STY (Japanese); Jung Hye-young (Korean)

Girls' Generation singles chronology
"Hoot" (2010)	"Mr. Taxi" (2011)	"The Boys" (2011)

Music video
- "Mr. Taxi" on YouTube

"Mr. Taxi" is the first original Japanese song recorded by South Korean girl group Girls' Generation. It was released as a double A-side single with the Japanese version of "Run Devil Run" on April 27, 2011, as the third single from the group's eponymous debut Japanese album. Composed by STY, Chad Royce and Scott Mann, with the Japanese lyrics written by STY and Korean lyrics written by Jung Hye-young, "Mr. Taxi" is an electropop and R&B song. A Korean version was later recorded and included on the group's third Korean studio album The Boys, and was released as the album's second single in December 2011.

"Mr. Taxi" was a commercial success in Japan; it became the group's first single to sell 100,000 physical units in its first week of release. The single peaked at number two on the Oricon Singles Chart, number five on the RIAJ Digital Track Chart, and number one on the Japan Hot 100. It received certifications from the Recording Industry Association of Japan on four bases–physical sales (gold), PC downloads (platinum), chaku-uta (double platinum), and full-length chaku-uta (double platinum). "Mr. Taxi" was also successful in Taiwan, on whose record chart it charted at number three. The Korean version peaked at number nine on the Gaon Digital Chart and sold over 1.5 million digital units in South Korea in 2011.

== Background and composition ==
"Mr. Taxi"
"Mr. Taxi" is an electropop and R&B song

Proceeds of the single were announced to be donated to the Japanese Red Cross. The double A-side single contains a Japanese version of their 2010 Korean single "Run Devil Run" which was released as a digital single on January 25, 2011. "Mr. Taxi / Run Devil Run" was the first release by the group that contained an original Japanese song, as all previous releases by the group in Japan had been covers of their Korean songs, "Gee" and "Genie".

"Mr. Taxi / Run Devil Run" was released physically in Japan in three different editions on April 27, 2011: The regular edition only contains the CD. The deluxe first press edition contains the CD single, a mini-photobook of the members, a trading card, and a DVD containing the music video of "Run Devil Run" and a dance version. The limited period edition contains the CD, a DVD with the music video of "Run Devil Run", and a different photobook. The Japanese version of "Run Devil Run" was offered digitally through the Japanese iTunes Store starting January 25, 2011. The single was released internationally on April 23, 2011, through digital download on the iTunes store. In the United Kingdom, the single impacted BBC Radio 1's Essential Mix on October 27, 2012.

A Korean version of "Mr. Taxi" was released on December 8, 2011, as the second single from their third Korean studio album, The Boys (2011). The group promoted the single prior to its release on various Korean music shows, including Music Bank, Show! Music Core, Inkigayo, and M! Countdown. "Mr. Taxi" received its first performance as a single on You Hee-yeol's Sketchbook broadcast on December 2, 2011. "Mr. Taxi" is an electropop and R&B song.

== Live performances ==
The girl group first performed "Mr. Taxi" live on May 13, 2011. They have since performed the song (both Korean and Japanese versions) on SM Town tours. In September 2012. while promoting "Oh!", they performed "Mr. Taxi" on "Hey! Hey! Hey! Music Champ" They then performed the song again as part of "Oh!"'s promotions on "Music Lovers".

== Commercial performance ==
"Mr. Taxi / Run Devil Run" set a new record for Girls' Generation, being their first Japanese single to sell 100,000 units during its first week of release. The single also managed to peak at the number one spot on the Billboard Japan Hot 100 for two consecutive weeks. It reached a peak of eleven on the year-end singles chart of the Japan Hot 100. On May 25, 2011, "Mr. Taxi" topped the Taiwanese music chart, G-Music. The single also performed well on the Oricon Singles Chart, reaching number on the daily chart, number two on the weekly chart, and number forty-six on the yearly chart. In the group's native South Korea, the single sold over 13,000 copies on the Gaon Album Chart. "Mr. Taxi" performed well on its own, selling 786,115 copies in 2011 on Gaon's International Download Chart.

== Music videos ==
The teaser video for "Mr. Taxi" was released on April 22, 2011, and the music video was released on April 28, 2011, the dance version was released three days prior on April 25, 2011. The choreography for "Mr. Taxi" was handled by long-time collaborator Rino Nakasone, with Sim Jaewon.

The video begins with the girls dressed in yellow taxi driver outfits in front of a screen that flashes words and patterns in blue lighting. Sooyoung leads the first chorus dance, while Jessica and Yoona lead the second and third. At the beginning of the second verse, it changes to the girls being dressed in black outfits (with differently colored piping for each girl), and dancing in front of a multicolored map of the world. Near the end of the second verse, and throughout the rest of the video, the video alternates between shots of the girls in their yellow outfits and their black outfits. After the second chorus, Sooyoung sings a rap bridge line "One, two, three, here we go! Oh!," which is followed by a dance break performed by Hyoyeon. The bridge continues with vocals by Yuri, Sunny, Sooyoung, Jessica, Tiffany and Taeyeon, after which there are more alternating shots between the two scenes (yellow and black outfits) for the final chorus, ending with the girls freezing in position in their yellow uniforms as the light fades out.

The music video was nominated for Video of the Year at the 2012 MTV Video Music Awards Japan but was lost to EXILE's Rising Sun.

A music video of the Korean version was released to accompany the single's release made entirely from the group's performance of the song on their 2011 Girls' Generation Asia Tour, with a dance rehearsal for the song leaking in March 2012.

== Track listing ==
Digital download / Regular CD Edition
No.	Title	Writer(s)	Producer(s)	Length
1.	"Mr. Taxi"	Allison Veltz, Paolo Prudencio, Chad Royce, Scott Mann	STY	3:32
2.	"Run Devil Run" (Japanese version)	Alex James, Michael Busbee, Kalle Engström, Hong Ji-yu, Kanata Nakamura	Alex James, Michael Busbee, Kalle Engström	3:21

Limited Edition DVD
No.	Title	Length
1.	"Run Devil Run (Japanese Version)" (Music Video)
2.	"Run Devil Run (Japanese Version)" (Music Video (Dance Version – CD+DVD Deluxe First Press Edition only))

== Charts ==
=== Japanese version ===
Weekly charts

Chart (2011)	Peak position
Japanese RIAJ Digital Track Chart	5
Japanese Oricon Singles Chart	2
Japan Hot 100 (Billboard)	1
South Korean Gaon Album Chart	1
Taiwan (G-Music)	3
U.S. World Digital Songs (Billboard)	12

Year-end charts

Chart (2011)	Position
Japanese Oricon Singles Chart	46
Japan Hot 100	11
South Korean International Albums Chart	4

=== Korean version ===
Weekly charts

Chart (2011)	Peak position
K-Pop Hot 100	15
South Korean Gaon Digital Chart	9

Year-end charts

Chart (2011)	Position
South Korean Gaon Digital Chart	170

== Certifications and sales ==
=== Japanese version ===
Region	Certification	Certified units/sales
Japan (RIAJ) Physical single	Gold	174,365
Japan (RIAJ) Ringtone	2× Platinum	500,000^{*}
Japan (RIAJ) Full-length ringtone	2× Platinum	500,000^{*}
Japan (RIAJ) PC Download	Platinum	250,000^{^}
Japan (RIAJ) Digital single	Million	1,000,000^{*}
South Korea physical single	—	12,933
South Korea digital download	—	786,115
^{*} Sales figures based on certification alone.^{^} Shipments figures based on certification alone.

=== Korean version ===
Region	Sales
South Korea (Gaon)	1,533,525 (digital download)

== Release history ==
Region	Date	Format	Label
Worldwide	April 23, 2011	Digital download	Nayutawave
Japan	April 27, 2011	Maxi single + DVD	Nayutawave
Hong Kong	May 11, 2011	CD single + DVD	Universal Music Group
