= Party (Girls' Generation song) =

Single by Girls' Generation

from the album Lion Heart
- B-side: "Check"
- Released: July 7, 2015
- Genre: Bubblegum pop; electropop
- Length: 3:13
- Label: S.M. Entertainment
- Composers: Albi Albertsson; Chris Young; Shin Agnes
- Lyricist: Cho Yoon-kyung

Girls' Generation singles chronology
"Catch Me If You Can" (2015)	"Party" (2015)	"Lion Heart" (2015)

Music video
- "Party" on YouTube

"Party" is a song recorded by South Korean girl group Girls' Generation for their fifth Korean studio album Lion Heart (2015). It was released as the lead single from the album by S.M. Entertainment on July 7, 2015. The lyrics were written by Cho Yoon-kyung and the music was composed by Albi Albertsson, Chris Young, and Shin Agnes. "Party" is a bubblegum pop and electropop song that features synthesizers, guitar, and Auto-Tune in its instrumentation. To promote the song and the album, Girls' Generation performed "Party" on several South Korean music programs, including Music Bank, Show! Music Core and Inkigayo. A music video for the track, directed by Hong Won-ki, was also released on July 7.

The single received generally favorable reviews from music critics, who praised its catchy music styles and compared the song to "California Gurls" by Katy Perry and "Get Lucky" by Daft Punk. Commercially, the single was a success in South Korea—the digital version peaked atop the Gaon Digital Chart (their eighth number one single there). Meanwhile, the physical edition charted at number two on the Gaon Album Chart. It has sold over 843,000 digital copies in South Korea as of December 2015. The song also peaked at number ten on the Japan Hot 100 and number four on the Billboard World Digital Songs chart.

== Background and release ==
South Korean girl group Girls' Generation had achieved success on the Asian music scene with hit singles such as "Gee" and "I Got a Boy" since their 2007 debut as a nine-piece girl group, consisting of members Taeyeon, Sunny, Tiffany, Hyoyeon, Yuri, Sooyoung, Yoona, Seohyun, and Jessica. In September 2014, Jessica announced that she had been dismissed as a member of Girls' Generation by their parent company S.M. Entertainment due to her schedule conflict between the group's mutual music activities and her own fashion business Blanc & Eclare; the group continued as an eight-member group thereafter.

Girls' Generation announced their first music release following Jessica's departure in March 2015—a single titled "Catch Me If You Can", whose Korean and Japanese versions were released simultaneously in April 2015. On June 30, 2015, Girls' Generation released music video previews of their then-forthcoming three new singles—"Party", "Lion Heart", and "You Think". "Party" was released as the lead single from the group's fifth Korean studio album Lion Heart, and features a song named "Check" as its B-side. It was released for digital purchase by S.M. Entertainment on July 7, 2015, and the physical CD single was released on July 8.

== Music and lyrics ==
"Party"
A 19-second sample of "Party", described as an electropop and bubblegum pop song.

"Party" was described by Billboard's Jeff Benjamin as an electropop song. He compared the guitar line to that on Katy Perry's 2010 song "California Gurls", and the Auto-Tune to Daft Punk's 2014 single "Get Lucky". Writing for Fuse, Benjamin noted that the track incorporated "lively" guitars, "perky" synthesizers, and a "catchy" hook. A reviewer from The Malay Mail characterized the song as "upbeat" bubblegum pop with a theme similar to that of "California Gurls" and Kesha's 2010 song "Tik Tok". Lyrically, "Party" is about a girls' night out with friends, and mentions drinking lemon soju, mojito and tequila.

== Reception ==
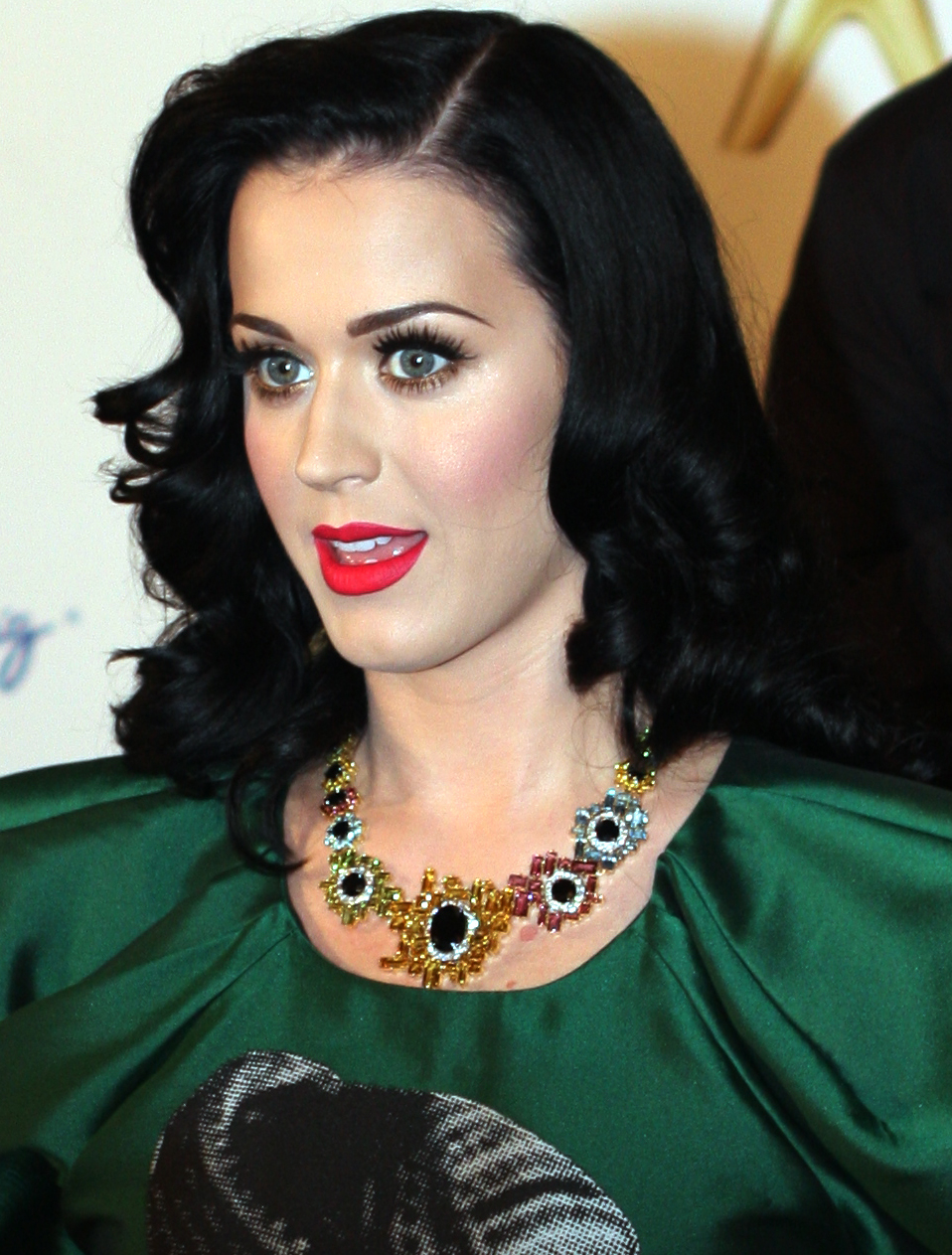
The song's styles and lyrics were compared to works of American singer Katy Perry.

=== Critical reception ===
"Party" received generally positive reviews from music critics. Melissa Locker of Vanity Fair described "Party" as "wildly catchy" and deemed it the best song of the second week of July 2015. Casey Lewis, writing for Teen Vogue, characterized it as a "perfect-for-summer synth-pop anthem" and compared the song's music styles to works of American singer Katy Perry. Jeff Benjamin from Fuse described the song as "addictive" and felt that it would "get a ton of plays at your next gals' night out." He also named it the best song of the summer of 2015. A reviewer from The Malay Mail wrote a positive review, saying "If Korean super girl group Girls' Generation's new upbeat, bubble-gum pop single doesn't brighten up your day, we don't know what will." In a more unfavorable review, however, Kim Do-heon from IZM felt that "the song itself doesn't have that much power", and "it feels like the brakes have been put on innovation".

=== Commercial performance ===
"Party" was a commercial success in South Korea. It debuted atop the Gaon Digital Chart on the chart issue dated July 5–11, 2015, and sold 256,390 digital units within its first week of release. Meanwhile, the physical single album peaked at number two on the Gaon Album Chart. As of December 2015, "Party" has sold over 843,843 digital units in South Korea, becoming the 58th best-selling single of 2015. Additionally, it became the 59th best-performing single on the Gaon Digital Chart of 2015, based on digital sales, streaming, and background music (instrumental track) downloads. The physical release was the 32nd best-selling release of the year with sales of 76,385 units.

"Party" debuted at number 22 on the Billboard Japan Hot 100 on July 20, 2015. The following week, it climbed to number 10, which later became its peak. On the Billboard World Digital Songs chart, "Party" peaked at number 4.

== Promotion ==
The music video for "Party", released in conjunction with the single, was choreographed by Kevin Maher and directed by Hong Won-ki of Zanybros. It was filmed in Ko Samui, Thailand, and has a beach setting that shows the group enjoying themselves at a summer beach party. There are also a few scenes that were filmed indoors in a bar where they dance to the song.

Lucas Villa from AXS praised the video's flamboyant fashion styles, writing that "Girls' Generation does summer right by living it up under the sun." The music video was an instant success on YouTube, achieving over 2.7 million views in one day. Within 36 hours, it garnered over 6 million views. The visual was the most viewed music video on YouTube by a South Korean music act in July 2015. To promote the single, Girls' Generation performed the song and its B-side "Check" at Banyan Tree Club & Spa in Seoul just before the release of "Party." Following the release of the single in July 2015, the group performed "Party" on several Korean music programs, including three major ones: KBS's Music Bank, MBC's Show! Music Core, and SBS' Inkigayo.

== Awards and nominations ==
Music programs awards
Program	Date	Ref.
The Show	July 14, 2015	
Show Champion	July 15, 2015	
M Countdown	July 16, 2015	
Music Bank	July 17, 2015	
Show! Music Core	July 18, 2015	
Inkigayo	July 19, 2015	
Inkigayo	July 26, 2015	

== Track listing ==
CD single / digital download
No.	Title	Lyrics	Music	Arrangement	Length
1.	"Party"	Cho Yoon-kyung	Albi Albertsson; Chris Young; Shin Agnes	Mussashi	3:13
2.	"Check"	Mafly	Teddy Riley; Lee Hyun-seung; Dominique Rodriguez; Daniel "Obi" Klein; Engelina Larsen	Riley; Lee; Rodriguez; Klein; Larsen	3:26
3.	"Party (Instrumental)"		Albertsson; Young; Shin	Mussashi	3:13
Total length:					9:52

== Credits ==
Credits are adapted from Lion Heart liner notes.

=== Party ===
==== Studio ====
- Ingrid Studio – recording, digital editing
- MonoTree Studio – recording, additional vocal editing
- SM Blue Cup Studio – mixing
- Sterling Sound – mastering

==== Personnel ====
- SM Entertainment – executive producer
- Lee Soo-man – producer
- Girls' Generation – vocals, background vocals
- Cho Yoon-kyung – lyrics
- Albi Albertsson – composition, arrangement
- Chris Young – composition
- Shin Agnes – composition, background vocals
- Yoo Shin-hye – background vocals
- Hwang Hyun – vocal directing, recording, Pro Tools operating, additional vocal editing
- Jung Eun-kyung – recording, digital editing
- Jung Eui-seok – mixing
- Tom Coyne – mastering

=== Check ===
==== Studio ====
- Ingrid Studio – recording, digital editing
- SM Blue Cup Studio – mixing
- MonoTree Studio – additional vocal editing
- Sterling Sound – mastering

==== Personnel ====
- SM Entertainment – executive producer
- Lee Soo-man – producer
- Girls' Generation – vocals, background vocals
- Mafly – lyrics
- Engelina Larsen – composition, arrangement, background vocals
- Dominique "DOM" Rodriguez – composition, arrangement
- Teddy Riley – composition, arrangement
- Daniel "Obi" Klein – composition, arrangement
- Lee Hyun-seung – composition, arrangement
- Lee Joo-hyung – vocal directing, Pro Tools operating
- Jung Eun-kyung – recording, digital editing
- Jung Eui-seok – mixing
- Choo Dae-kwan – additional vocal editing
- Tom Coyne – mastering

== Charts and sales ==
=== Weekly charts ===
Chart (2015)	Peak position
South Korea (Gaon Digital Chart)	1 (Note: Based on digital sales, streaming, and background music (instrumental track) downloads)
South Korea (Gaon Album Chart)	2 (Note: Based on physical sales)
Japan (Billboard Japan Hot 100)	10
US World Digital Songs (Billboard)	4

=== Year-end charts ===
Chart (2015)	Position
South Korea (Gaon Digital Chart)	59
South Korea (Gaon Album Chart)	32

=== Sales ===
Country	Sales
South Korea (Gaon)	843,843 (digital)
South Korea (Gaon)	76,385 (physical)

== Release history ==
Region	Date	Format	Distributor
Australia	July 7, 2015	Digital download	S.M. Entertainment
Belgium	July 7, 2015	Digital download	S.M. Entertainment
Canada	July 7, 2015	Digital download	S.M. Entertainment
Finland	July 7, 2015	Digital download	S.M. Entertainment
France	July 7, 2015	Digital download	S.M. Entertainment
Germany	July 7, 2015	Digital download	S.M. Entertainment
Japan	July 7, 2015	Digital download	S.M. Entertainment
New Zealand	July 7, 2015	Digital download	S.M. Entertainment
Norway	July 7, 2015	Digital download	S.M. Entertainment
South Korea	July 7, 2015	Digital download	S.M. Entertainment
United Kingdom	July 7, 2015	Digital download	S.M. Entertainment
United States	July 7, 2015	Digital download	S.M. Entertainment
South Korea	July 8, 2015	CD	S.M. Entertainment, KT Music

== Footnotes ==
Notes
