= Skibidi (Girls' Generation-HRS song) =

Single by Girls' Generation-HRS
- B-side: "Lowkey in Love"
- Released: August 31, 2026
- Length: 2:46
- Label: SM
- Composers: Jinbyjin; Hwang Hyun; Cazzi Opeia
- Lyricist: Kenzie

Performance video
- "Skibidi" on YouTube

"Skibidi" is the debut single by Girls' Generation-HRS, a subunit of South Korean girl group Girls' Generation. It was released on August 31, 2026, with the B-side "Lowkey in Love".

== Background ==
Girls' Generation-HRS originated from a running gag in Hyoyeon's mockumentary series Fake Kim Hyoyeon on her YouTube channel Hyo's Level Up, in which she expressed jealousy of and an ambition to compete with Girls' Generation-TTS, an earlier sub-unit of Girls' Generation comprising three of the group's primary vocalists. HRS instead comprises Hyoyeon, Yuri, and Sooyoung, three of the group's primary dancers who often received fewer vocal parts in Girls' Generation's songs. Hyoyeon initially proposed the sub-unit as a joke in an episode of Fake Kim Hyoyeon released in September 2025.

== Composition ==
HRS released the digital single "Skibidi" on August 31, 2026. Its title refers to the internet meme and slang term "skibidi", which became popular among Generation Alpha. "Skibidi" incorporates elements of house and hip-hop and has an eclectic structure that was compared to Girls' Generation's "I Got a Boy", while its B-side, "Lowkey in Love", is an upbeat R&B-pop song described as reminiscent of the musical style of Girls' Generation's predecessor S.E.S.

== Promotion ==
HRS performed both songs at the 2026 CassCool Festival on August 22 and made their first televised music program appearance on the September 5 episode of MBC's Show! Music Core.

== Track listing ==
"Skibidi" track listing
No.	Title	Lyrics	Music	Arrangement	Length
1.	"Skibidi"	Kenzie	Jinbyjin; Hwang Hyun (MonoTree); Cazzi Opeia	Jinbyjin; Hwang	2:46
2.	"Lowkey in Love"	Lee Ha-jin	Honey Noise; Brown Panda (The Hub); Chanti (The Hub); Noerio	Honey Noise; Brown Panda	2:48
Total length:					5:34

== Charts ==
=== Weekly charts ===
Weekly chart performance for "Skibidi"
Chart (2026)	Peak position
South Korea (Circle)	21

=== Monthly charts ===
Monthly chart performance for "Skibidi"
Chart (2026)	Peak position
South Korea (Circle)	21
