= Lion Heart (song) =

Single by Girls' Generation

from the album Lion Heart
- Released: August 18, 2015
- Genre: Bubblegum pop
- Length: 3:45
- Label: SM
- Composers: Sean Alexander; Darren "Baby Dee Beats" Smith; Claudia Brant
- Lyricists: Jeon Ji-eun; Hwang Seon-jeong; Kim Jeong-mi; Choi So-young; Joy Factory; Hwang Hyun

Girls' Generation singles chronology
"Party" (2015)	"Lion Heart" (2015)	"You Think" (2015)

Music video
- "Lion Heart" on YouTube

"Lion Heart" is a song that was recorded by South Korean girl group Girls' Generation for their fifth studio album of the same name. It was released as the album's title track by SM Entertainment on August 18, 2015.

== Composition ==
"Lion Heart"
"Lion Heart" is described as a soul pop-inspired bubblegum pop song.

"Lion Heart" was described as a soul pop-inspired bubblegum pop song by Billboard. It embraces a 1960s American retro sound and has a jazzy melody as well as "an ear-grabbing bass line". Lyrically, the song talks about women falling in love with men who have a cheating heart and how they try to tame him like taming a lion.

== Music video ==
The music video was released on August 18, 2015. The music video narrates a story where the members of Girls' Generation each fall in love with a male protagonist, who turns out to be the same man (with his head being that of a lion, representing the song's conceptual "lion heart/lyin' heart" pun). They become upset and team up against him, then go on to reject further advances from him separately. The song was choreographed by the American choreographer Tony Testa & SM Entertainment's choreographer Shim Jaewon. It became third most viewed music video on YouTube by a South Korean act in August 2015.

== Reception ==
Billboard praised the song for its retro themes and shifting of member roles saying "But what is new, musically, is the division of lines – namely when Yuri, a member who typically only chimes in with a line or two, gets to handle a majority of the second chorus. It's a decision that further shows how Girls' Generation is embracing change in their eighth year..." The song was deemed the 7th best K-pop single of 2015 by PopMatters. Meanwhile, Idolator chose it as the 24th best K-pop song of the year.

== Awards and nominations ==
"Lion Heart" received 14 music program awards in South Korea. It was nominated for Song of the Month (September) at the 5th Gaon Chart Music Awards, but lost to iKon's "My Type". It was one of the Digital Song Bonsang winners at the 30th Golden Disc Awards and was nominated for Digital Daesang.

Music program awards
Program	Date
The Show	August 25, 2015
Show Champion	August 26, 2015
M Countdown	August 27, 2015
M Countdown	September 3, 2015
M Countdown	September 10, 2015
Music Bank	August 28, 2015
Music Bank	September 4, 2015
Music Bank	September 11, 2015
Music Bank	September 18, 2015
Show! Music Core	August 29, 2015
Show! Music Core	September 19, 2015
Inkigayo	August 30, 2015
Inkigayo	September 6, 2015
Inkigayo	September 13, 2015

== Credits ==
Credits are adapted from Lion Heart liner notes.

=== Studio ===
- SM Blue Ocean Studio – recording
- SM Blue Cup Studio – recording
- SM Concert Hall Studio – mixing
- Ingrid Studio – recording, digital editing
- MonoTree Studio – recording, additional vocal editing
- Sterling Sound – mastering

=== Personnel ===
- SM Entertainment – executive producer
- Lee Soo-man – producer
- Kim Young-min – executive supervisor
- Girls' Generation – vocals
  - Taeyeon – background vocals
- Jeon Ji-eun – lyrics
- Hwang Seon-jeong – lyrics
- Kim Jeong-mi – lyrics
- Choi So-young – lyrics
- Joy Factory – lyrics
- Hwang Hyun – lyrics, vocal directing, recording, Pro Tools operating
- Sean Alexander – composition
- Darren "Baby Dee Beats" Smith – composition, arrangement
- Claudia Brant – composition
- Avenue 52 – arrangement
- Shin Agnes – background vocals
- Kim Cheol-sun – recording
- Jung Eui-seok – recording
- Jung Eun-kyung – recording, digital editing
- Choo Dae-kwan – additional vocal editing
- Nam Koong-jin – mixing
- Tom Coyne – mastering

== Charts ==
=== Weekly charts ===
Chart (2015)	Peak position
Japan (Japan Hot 100)	49
South Korea (Gaon)	4
US World Digital Songs (Billboard)	3

=== Year-end chart ===
Chart (2015)	Position
South Korea (Gaon)	44

== Sales ==
Country	Sales
South Korea (digital)	1,120,388

== Release history ==
Country	Release date	Format
South Korea	August 21, 2015	Contemporary hit radio
