= You Think =

Single by Girls' Generation

from the album Lion Heart
- Released: August 22, 2015
- Genre: Electropop; hip hop
- Length: 3:08
- Label: S.M. Entertainment
- Composer(s): Sara Forsberg; Dante Jones; Brandon Sammon; Denzil "DR" Remedios; Ryan S. Jhun; Jussi Ilmari Karvinen
- Lyricist(s): Cho Yoon-kyung; MQ

Girls' Generation singles chronology
"Lion Heart" (2015)	"You Think" (2015)	"Sailing (0805)" (2016)

Audio sample
- "You Think": file; help

Music video
- "You Think" on YouTube

"You Think" is a song performed by South Korean girl group Girls' Generation. It was released on August 19, 2015, as the third single from the group's fifth studio album Lion Heart by S.M. Entertainment.

== Composition ==
"You Think" was described by Jeff Benjamin from Billboard as a hip hop-friendly song featuring trap beats. Meanwhile, Arirang deemed it a "powerful pop dance song". The song's arrangement features high-pitched belts and brassy horns that were described to "create subtle, siren-like tones on the irresistible dance break." Lyrically, the song expresses a woman's warning towards a former male lover, who spreads bad rumors about her after they have broken up. In an interview, Girls' Generation member Seohyun described the song as an opportunity to "demonstrate Girls' Generation's performance and vocal skills properly".

== Music video ==
The video has Girls' Generation members portrayed as cool, mature women with the choreography of the song being its main highlight. Jeff Benjamin from Billboard stated, "Staying in line with the top-notch choreography shown in 'Catch Me If You Can,' the video again sees Girls' Generation attempting more intricate routines than they have in years — to must-watch results." The choreography employed several moves including "leg spreads, athletic twirls, sensual hair flips and booty pops" and was choreographed by Kyle Hanagami.

== Charts ==
Chart (2015)	Peak position
South Korea (Gaon)	30
US World Digital Songs (Billboard)	3

== Release history ==
Country	Release date	Format
South Korea	August 22, 2015	Contemporary hit radio

== Credits ==
Credits are adapted from Lion Heart liner notes.

=== Studio ===
- SM LVYIN Studio – recording
- SM Yellow Tail Studio – mixing
- Ingrid Studio – recording, digital editing, additional vocal editing
- doobdoob Studio – recording
- Sterling Sound – mastering

=== Personnel ===
- SM Entertainment – executive producer
- Lee Soo-man – producer
- Kim Young-min – executive supervisor
- Girls' Generation – vocals, background vocals
- Cho Yoon-kyung – lyrics
- MQ – lyrics
- Sara Forsberg – composition, arrangement
- Dante Jones – composition, arrangement
- Brandon Sammon – composition, arrangement
- Denzil "DR" Remedios – composition, arrangement
- Ryan S. Jhun – composition, arrangement
- Jussi Ilmari Karvinen – composition, arrangement
- Kenzie – vocal directing
- Lee Ji-hong – recording
- Jung Eun-kyung – recording, digital editing, additional vocal editing
- Kim Eun-cheol – recording
- Gu Jong-pil – mixing
- Tom Coyne – mastering
