= Lion Heart (album) =

- Digital and Lion Heart version cover

Studio album by Girls' Generation
- Released: August 19, 2015
- Recorded: February – June 2015
- Studios: SM Studios, Seoul, South Korea
- Genres: Bubblegum pop; electropop; Hip hop; Bossa nova; R&B
- Length: 41:14
- Language: Korean
- Labels: SM; KT Music; Dreamus
- Producer: Lee Soo-man

Girls' Generation chronology
The Best (2014)	Lion Heart (2015)	Holiday Night (2017)

Singles from Lion Heart
- 1. "Party" Released: July 7, 2015; 2. "Lion Heart" Released: August 18, 2015; 3. "You Think" Released: August 22, 2015

Lion Heart is the fifth Korean studio album and the eighth overall by South Korean girl group Girls' Generation. Produced by Lee Soo-man, Lion Heart musically encompasses styles of electropop and bubblegum pop. It was released in two parts throughout August 18 and August 19, 2015, by SM Entertainment; another version with a different cover titled You Think was distributed on August 26, 2015. This is the group's first overall studio album without former member Jessica, who was dismissed from the group on September 30, 2014.

The album spawned three singles. Its lead single, "Party", was released on July 7, 2015, and peaked atop the Gaon Digital Chart, further reaching number ten on the Japan Hot 100. It was followed up by "Lion Heart" and "You Think" in August 2015, charting at number four and thirty on the Gaon Digital Chart, respectively. In order to promote the record, Girls' Generation appeared on several South Korean music programs, such as Music Bank, Show! Music Core, and Inkigayo, where they performed material from the album. The group additionally embarked on a concert tour named Girls' Generation's Phantasia, which commenced on November 21, 2015, in Seoul and visited East and Southeast Asia.

== Background and composition ==
According to Slant Magazine's Anzhe Zhang, Lion Heart consists of primarily bubblegum pop songs. Echoing Zhang's viewpoint, Chester Chin from Malaysian newspaper The Star wrote that the album was a collection of bubblegum pop tracks. The record's opening track, "Lion Heart", is a soul pop-influenced bubblegum pop song which embraces a retro-styled sound while being instrumented by basslines and brass. "Party" was detailed as an electropop song that is backed up by guitars, synthesizers and Auto-Tune. Aside from the signature sound, Lion Heart also encompasses several other genres; "You Think" was characterized as an electropop and hip hop recording featuring trap beats and horns in its composition. "One Afternoon" draws influence from bossa nova and incorporates Spanish guitars, while "Show Girls" portrays an electropop song originally recorded in Japanese for the group's 2014 greatest hits album, The Best. "Check" is a mild R&B track, and "Sign" was described as a dark synthpop song. "Bump It" is a hybrid of various genres that incorporates hi-hat beats.

== Release and promotion ==
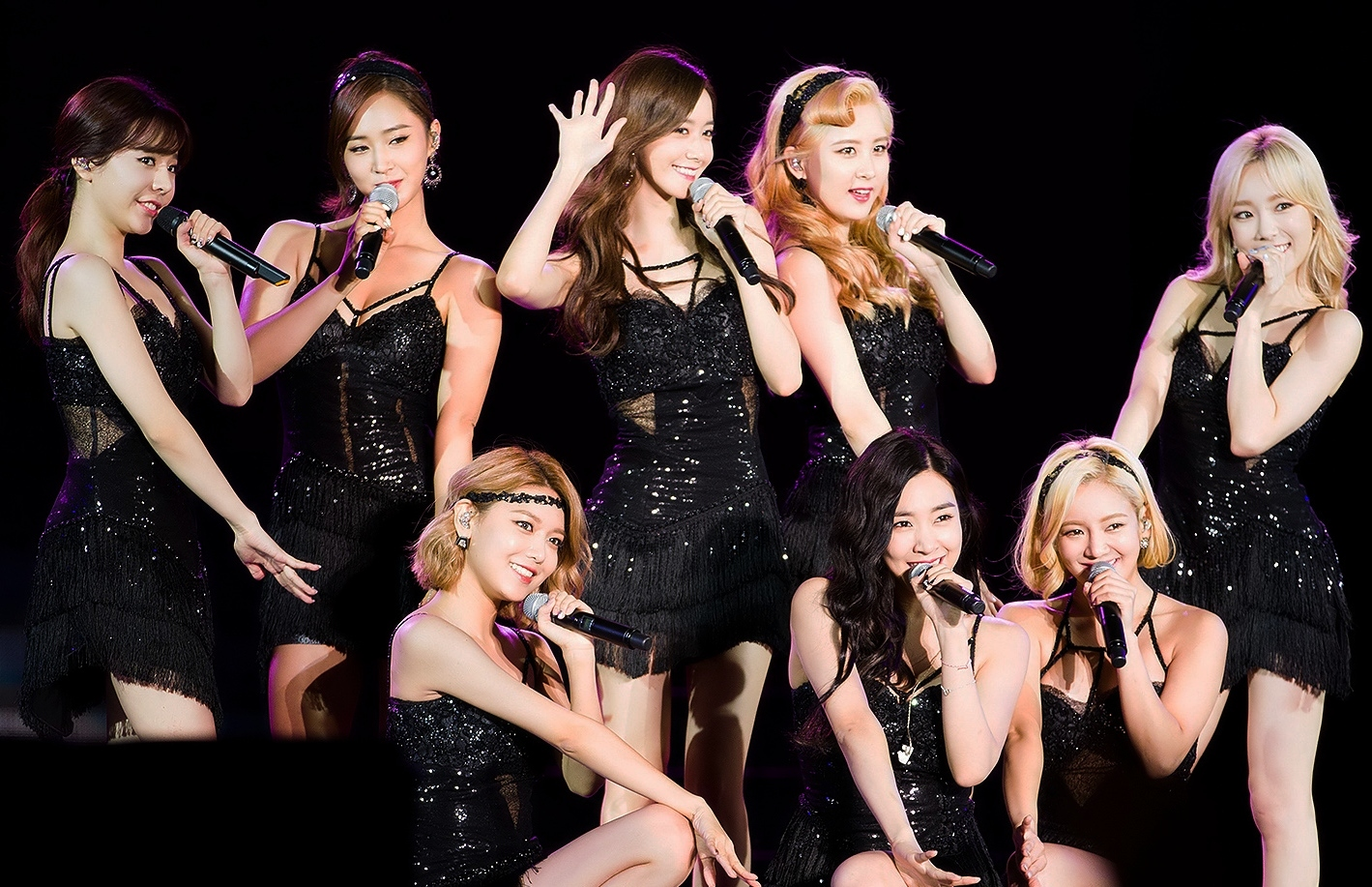
Girls' Generation performing at MBC's 2015 DMC Festival.

On June 30, 2015, the group released music video previews of three then-forthcoming singles "Party", "Lion Heart" and "You Think", serving as a promotional tool for their first Korean language studio album as an eight-member group. Details on album, including its title, release date, cover artwork and track list, were announced on August 12, 2015. The group's label, SM Entertainment, revealed that the record would be released in the span of two days. The first six songs—including the single "Lion Heart"—would be made available on August 18, while the remaining tracks—including the single "You Think"—would be distributed on the following day; Billboard described the release strategy as "atypical." An alternative edition of the album featuring a different artwork was additionally released on August 26, 2015, under the title You Think.

Following the release of the record, Girls' Generation appeared on several South Korean music programs, including KBS's Music Bank, MBC's Show! Music Core, and SBS' Inkigayo, in order to promote the record, with them performing "Lion Heart" and "You Think". Throughout August 18–25, the group also participated and interacted with viewers through a series of mobile video live stream on Naver's mobile application "V". Subsequently, the group additionally embarked on a concert tour titled Girls' Generation's Phantasia, which kicked off on November 21, 2015, at the Olympic Gymnastics Arena in Seoul, and continued in visiting Japan, Thailand, Indonesia and Taiwan.

"Party" was made available as the lead single from Lion Heart for digital purchase by SM on July 7, 2015. The physical CD single was made available for purchase on July 8, 2015. An accompanying music video for the recording was released in conjunction with the release of the single. Commercially, "Party" debuted atop the Gaon Digital Chart on the chart issue dated July 11, 2015, selling 256,390 digital units within its first week of availability, bringing total sales to over 843,843 digital units in South Korea as of December 2015, thus becoming the 58th best-selling single of 2015. "Party" additionally peaked at number ten on the Japan Hot 100 and number four on the Billboard World Digital Songs. The title track was serviced as the album's second single, and its music video premiered on August 18, 2015. Subsequently, "You Think" served as the third and final single, being accompanied by a visual which was released the day following "Lion Heart"'s availability. The title track was added to Korean Broadcasting System's "K-Pop Connection" radio playlist on August 21, while "You Think" impacted KBS radio on August 23. Both songs charted on the Gaon Digital Chart, peaking at numbers four and 30, respectively.

== Critical reception ==
Professional ratings
Review scores
Source	Rating
Slant Magazine	3/5 stars
IZM	3.5/5 stars
The Star	6/10

Upon its release, Lion Heart garnered mixed reviews from music critics. Slant Magazine's Anzhe Zhang wrote that the album was released to "quash" the suspicions that Girls' Generation was declining after the departure of member Jessica in September 2014. However, she added, "while [the album]'s great for omnivorous die-hard fans, it ultimately feels a little more than scatter-brained." Chester Chin, penning for Malaysian newspaper The Star, praised the release of singles "Party", "Lion Heart" and "You Think" as "a promising start." Nevertheless, he disapproved of the rest of the album, dubbing it a "relatively tame offering" for "[traversing] way too quickly into filler territory" and criticizing the songs "Green Light" and "Paradise" for being too "generic." Kim Do-heon from South Korean online magazine IZM was slightly more positive towards the album, calling it "elegant", and appreciating the record's musical styles even though he felt that it was a decline compared to the group's previous albums as a nine-piece group.

Lion Heart experienced commercial acclaim in South Korea. It debuted atop the Gaon Album Chart on the chart issue dated August 22, 2015, and remained on the top spot for a further week. Two weeks after its debut chart appearance, it dropped 35 positions, charting at number 36. Lion Heart was the best-selling album of August 2015 in South Korea, selling 131,228 physical copies, while overall being the 13th most-sold album of 2015 in that country with total sales of 145,044 units. Lion Heart additionally charted at number 11 on the Japanese Oricon Albums Chart on the chart issue dated August 31, 2015, while peaking atop the Billboard World Albums chart and becoming the group's second number one following their 2013 album, I Got a Boy.

== Track listing ==
Credits adapted from the liner notes of Lion Heart.

Lion Heart track listing
No.	Title	Lyrics	Music	Arrangement	Length
1.	"Lion Heart"	Jeon Ji-eun (January 8th (lalala Studio)); Hwang Seon-jeong (January 8th (lalala Studio)); Kim Jeong-mi (January 8th (lalala Studio)); Choi So-young; Joy Factory	Sean Alexander (Avenue 52); Darren "Baby Dee Beats" Smith; Claudia Brant	Avenue 52; Darren "Baby Dee Beats" Smith	3:44
2.	"You Think"	Jo Yoon-kyung	Sara Forsberg; Dante Jones; Brandon "BSAMZ" Sammons; Denzil "iDR" Remedios; Ryan S. Jhun; Jussi Ilmari Karvinen	Sara Forsberg; Dante Jones; Brandon "BSAMZ" Sammons; Denzil "iDR" Remedios; Ryan S. Jhun; Jussi Ilmari Karvinen	3:09
3.	"Party"	Jo Yoon-kyung	Albi Albertsson (Mussashi); Chris Young (Chestnut Music Group); Agnes Shin (MonoTree)	Mussashi	3:13
4.	"One Afternoon" (어떤 오후; Eotteon Ohu)	Hwang Hyun (MonoTree); Agnes Shin (Monotree)	Hwang Hyun (MonoTree); Agnes Shin (Monotree)	MonoTree	3:35
5.	"Show Girls" (Korean version)	Mafly (Joombas)	Ricky Hanley; Paul Drew (DWB Music); Greig Watts (DWB Music); Pete Barringer (DWB Music); Joe "2 Ton" Killington (Notting Hill Music); Katerina Bramley (Notting Hill Music)	DWB Music	3:39
6.	"Fire Alarm"	Kenzie	Kenzie; Johan Gustafson (Trinity Music); Fredrik Häggstam (Trinity Music); Sebastian Lundberg (Trinity Music)	Kenzie; Trinity Music	3:11
7.	"Talk Talk"	Jo Yoon-kyung	Eirik Johansen (Mental Audio); Jan Hallvard Larsen (Mental Audio); Ylva Dimberg (The Kennel)	Mental Audio; Ylva Dimberg (The Kennel)	3:23
8.	"Green Light"	Mafly (Joombas)	Harvey Mason Jr. (The Underdogs); Damon Thomas (The Underdogs); Mike Daley; Andrew Hey; Britt Burton; Rodnae "Chikk" Bell	The Underdogs; Mike Daley; Andrew Hey; Britt Burton; Rodnae "Chikk" Bell	2:52
9.	"Paradise"	U.F.O.; Mafly (Joombas)	Nermin Harambašić; Courtney Jenaé Stahl; Charite Viken Reinås; Erik Fjeld; Saima Irén Mian	Nermin Harambašić; Courtney Jenaé Stahl; Charite Viken Reinås; Erik Fjeld; Saima Irén Mian	3:50
10.	"Check"	Mafly (Joombas)	Teddy Riley (Red Rocket); Lee Hyun-seung (Red Rocket); Dominique "DOM" Rodriguez (Red Rocket); Daniel "Obi" Klein; Engelina Larsen	Red Rocket; Daniel "Obi" Klein; Engelina Larsen	3:26
11.	"Sign"	Kim Boo-min	Hitchhiker	Hitchhiker	3:17
12.	"Bump It" (예감; Yegam; lit. 'Presentiment')	Jo Yoon-kyung	Anne Judith Wik; Ronny Svendsen; Uwe Fahrenkrog-Petersen; Greg Fitzgerald	Dsign Music; Uwe Fahrenkrog-Petersen; Greg Fitzgerald	3:48
Total length:					41:14

== Personnel ==
Credits adapted from the liner notes of Lion Heart.

- SM Entertainment Co., Ltd. – executive producer
- Lee Soo-man – producer
- Nam So-young – director of management
- Jeong Chang-hwan – director of media planning
- Lee Seong-soo – A&R director and coordinator
- Yoo Je-ni – A&R director and coordinator
- Park Hae-in – A&R director and coordinator
- Jo Min-kyeong – international A&R
- Lee Seo-kyeong – international A&R
- Jeong Hyo-won – publishing and copyright clearance
- Kim Min-kyeong – publishing and copyright clearance
- Oh Jeong-eun – publishing and copyright clearance
- Park Mi-ji – publishing and copyright clearance
- Kim Cheol-soon – recording engineer
- Jeong Ui-seok – recording engineer
- Jeong Eun-kyeong – recording engineer
- Kim Eun-cheol – recording engineer
- Lee Ji-hong – recording engineer
- Oh Seong-keun – recording engineer
- Baek Kyeong-hoon – recording engineer assistant
- Nam Koong-jin (SM Concert Hall Studio) – mixing engineer
- Koo Jong-pil (Beat Burger) (SM Yellow Tail Studio) – mixing engineer
- Kim Cheol-soon (SM Blue Ocean Studio) – mixing engineer
- Jeong Ui-seok (SM Blue Cup Studio) – mixing engineer
- Miles Walker (Silent Sound Studios, Atlanta) – mixing engineer
- Tom Coyne (Sterling Sound) – master engineer
- Tak Young-joon – artist management and promotions
- Choi Seong-woo – artist management and promotions
- Kim Ho-jin – artist management and promotions
- Kim Yong-deok – artist management and promotions
- Park Seong-joon – artist management and promotions
- Park Ki-mok – artist management and promotions
- Son Seung-woo – artist management and promotions
- Kim Yong-ha – artist management and promotions
- Kang Mi-joo – artist management and promotions
- Lee Seong-soo – artist planning and development
- Yoon Hee-joon – artist planning and development
- Jo Yoo-eun – artist planning and development
- Kim Eun-a – public relations and publicity
- Jeong Sang-hee – public relations and publicity
- Lee Ji-seon – public relations and publicity
- Kwon Jeong-hwa – public relations and publicity
- Lee Ji-hyeon – public relations and publicity
- Kim Min-seong – media planner
- Bok Min-kwon – media planner
- Jeong Kyeong-shik – media planner
- Tak Young-joon – choreography director
- Hong Seong-yong – choreography director
- Jae Sim (Beat Burger) – choreography director
- Greg Hwang (Beat Burger) – choreography director
- Tony Testa – choreographer
- Kyle Hanagami – choreographer
- Jae Sim (Beat Burger) – choreographer
- Kevin Maher – choreographer
- J.eun – choreographer
- Jeong Jin-seok (Nana School) – choreographer
- Choi Jeong-min – international marketing
- Eom Hye-young – customer relationship management
- Park Joon-young – music video direction
- Son Young – music video direction
- Jeon Seong-jin – music video direction
- Hong Won-ki – music video director
- Ian Henry – music video director
- Lee Gi-baek – music video director
- Jo Woo-cheol – art direction and design
- Ji-young – hair stylist
- Woo-joo – hair stylist
- Seo Soo-kyeong – stylist
- Seo Soo-myeong – stylist
- Lee Bo-ra – stylist
- Park Soo-kyeong – stylist
- Ryu Ji-hye – stylist
- Kim Soo-bin – stylist
- Seo Ok – make-up artist
- Jo Joo-young – make-up artist
- Han Jong-cheol – photographer
- Lee Young-hak – photographer
- Kim Yong-min – executive supervisor
- Girls' Generation – vocals
  - Taeyeon – vocals
  - Sunny – vocals
  - Tiffany – vocals
  - Hyoyeon – vocals
  - Yuri – vocals
  - Sooyoung – vocals
  - Yoona – vocals
  - Seohyun – vocals

== Charts ==
=== Weekly charts ===
Chart (2015)	Peak position
Japanese Albums (Oricon)	11
South Korean Albums (Gaon)	1
Taiwanese East Asian Albums (G-Music)	3
US Heatseekers Albums (Billboard)	7
US World Albums (Billboard)	1

=== Monthly chart ===
Chart (2015)	Position
South Korean Albums (Gaon)	1

=== Year-end chart ===
Chart (2015)	Position
South Korean Albums (Gaon)	13

== Release history ==
Country	Date	Edition	Format	Label
South Korea	August 18, 2015	Lion Heart part 1	Digital download	SM
South Korea	August 19, 2015	Lion Heart part 2	Digital download	SM
Worldwide	August 19, 2015	Standard	Digital download	SM
South Korea	August 20, 2015	Standard	CD	SM; KT Music
South Korea	August 26, 2015	You Think edition	CD	SM; KT Music
Taiwan	March 18, 2016	Standard	CD + DVD	Universal Taiwan
