= Girls' Generation-HRS =

South Korean girl group

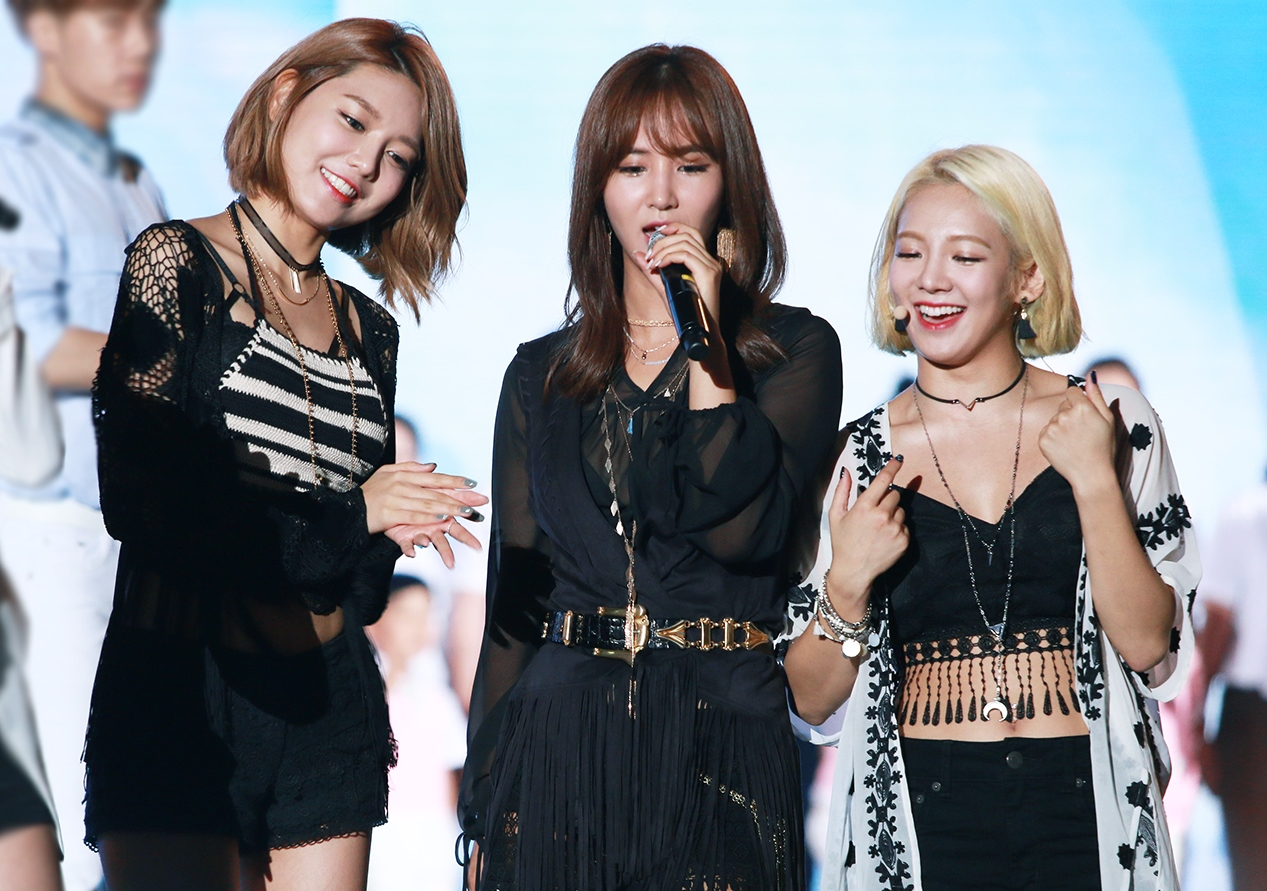
- The members of Girls' Generation-HRS in August 2015; From left to right, Sooyoung, Yuri, and Hyoyeon

Background information
- Origin: Seoul, South Korea
- Genres: K-pop; dance-pop
- Years active: 2026–present
- Label: SM
- Spinoff of: Girls' Generation
- Members: Hyoyeon; Yuri; Sooyoung

Girls' Generation-HRS (Korean: 소녀시대-효리수, also known as HRS, HyoRiSoo, or Girls' Generation-HyoRiSoo) is the third sub-unit of South Korean girl group Girls' Generation, formed by SM Entertainment in 2026. It consists of three Girls' Generation members: Hyoyeon, Yuri, and Sooyoung. The group originated from the comedy web series Fake Kim Hyoyeon, with several episodes featuring the trio released before their official debut on August 31, 2026, with the single "Skibidi".

== History ==
=== 2025–2026: Formation and "HyoRiSoo Debut Project" ===
Girls' Generation-HRS originated from a running gag in Hyoyeon's mockumentary series Fake Kim Hyoyeon on her YouTube channel Hyo's Level Up, in which she expressed jealousy of and an ambition to compete with Girls' Generation-TTS, an earlier sub-unit of Girls' Generation comprising three of the group's primary vocalists. HRS instead comprises Hyoyeon, Yuri, and Sooyoung, three of the group's primary dancers who often received fewer vocal parts in Girls' Generation's songs. Hyoyeon initially proposed the sub-unit as a joke in an episode of Fake Kim Hyoyeon released in September 2025.

The trio had previously performed together during the 2015–2016 Girls' Generation's Phantasia concert tour under the name SHY, derived from their initials. In February 2026, Yuri and Sooyoung appeared on an episode of Fake Kim Hyoyeon in which the three argued over who would be the main vocalist and what their sub-unit would be called. In May, the first episode of the Fake Kim Hyoyeon sub-series "HyoRiSoo Debut Project" was released.

With comedic premises such as the members acting as rookies alongside idols younger than themselves after 19 years of experience as members of Girls' Generation, episodes of "HyoRiSoo Debut Project" received millions of views. The trio also appeared on televised Korean variety shows including You Quiz on the Block and Omniscient Interfering View. In addition, HRS recorded the song "A Starry Night" for the soundtrack of a short-form drama project created by the variety show Hangout with Yoo, first performing the song on the program's June 20 episode.

=== 2026–present: Debut with "Skibidi" ===
HRS released the digital single "Skibidi" on August 31, 2026. Its title refers to the internet meme and slang term "skibidi", which became popular among Generation Alpha. "Skibidi" incorporates elements of house and hip-hop and has an eclectic structure that was compared to Girls' Generation's "I Got a Boy", while its B-side, "Lowkey in Love", is an upbeat R&B-pop song described as reminiscent of the musical style of Girls' Generation's predecessor S.E.S. HRS performed both songs at the 2026 CassCool Festival on August 22 and made their first televised music program appearance on the September 5 episode of MBC's Show! Music Core. The music video for "Skibidi" received five million views within two days.

== Reception ==
Several South Korean media outlets discussed HRS in connection with two recent trends in the South Korean entertainment industry: veteran entertainers adopting alter egos to present different aspects of themselves, and K-pop groups using self-produced content to build audience interest in members' personalities and group dynamics before attracting interest in their music. Popular culture critic Ha Jae-geun described the alter ego concept as a potential "stepping stone for major activities".

== Discography ==
=== Singles ===
List of singles, showing year released, selected chart positions, and name of the album
Title	Year	Peak chart positions	Album
Title	Year	KOR	Album
"Skibidi"	2026	21	Non-album single

=== Soundtrack appearances ===
List of singles, showing year released and name of the album
Title	Year	Album
"A Starry Night"	2026	Hangout with Yoo Short Form Drama OST

=== Other charted songs ===
List of other charted songs, showing year released, selected chart positions, and name of the album
Title	Year	Peak chart positions	Album
Title	Year	KOR	Album
"Lowkey in Love"	2026	177	"Skibidi"
