= Girls' Generation =

South Korean girl group

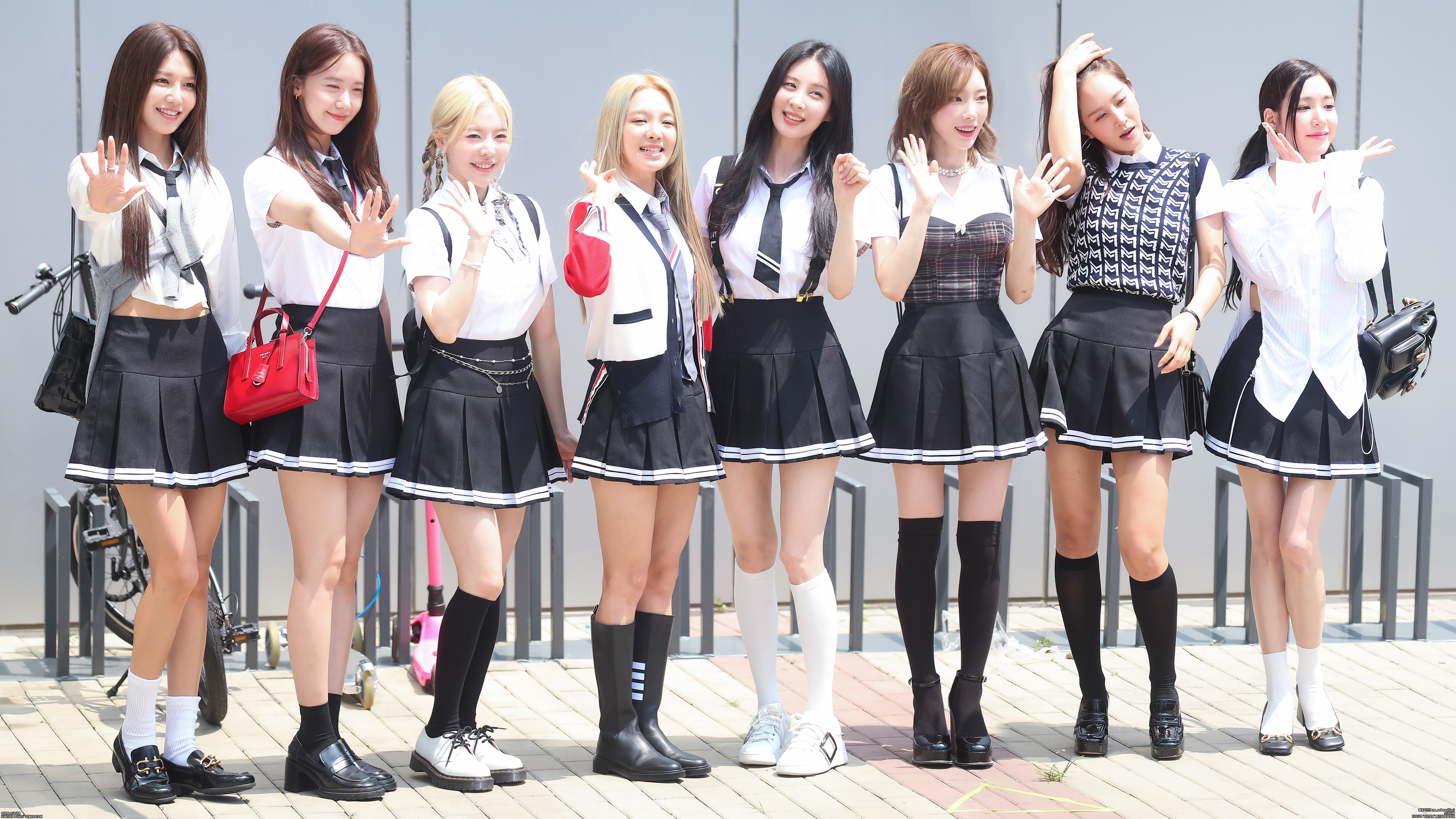
- Girls' Generation in July 2022; L–R: Sooyoung, Yoona, Sunny, Hyoyeon, Seohyun, Taeyeon, Yuri, and Tiffany

Background information
- Origin: Seoul, South Korea
- Genres: K-pop; bubblegum pop; electropop; J-pop
- Years active: 2007–2017; 2022–present
- Labels: SM; EMI Japan; Interscope
- Spinoffs: Girls' Generation-TTS; Girls' Generation-Oh!GG; Girls' Generation-HRS
- Members: Taeyeon; Sunny; Tiffany; Hyoyeon; Yuri; Sooyoung; Yoona; Seohyun
- Past members: Jessica
- Website: www.smentertainment.com/artist/

Korean name
- Hangul: 소녀시대
- Hanja: 少女時代
- Revised Romanization: Sonyeo Sidae
- McCune–Reischauer: Sonyŏ Sidae

Japanese name
- Kanji: 少女時代
- Hiragana: しょうじょじだい
- Revised Hepburn: Shōjo Jidai
- Kunrei-shiki: Syôjo Jidai

Girls' Generation (Korean: 소녀시대; RR: Sonyeo Sidae), also known as SNSD, is a South Korean girl group formed by SM Entertainment. The group is composed of eight members: Taeyeon, Sunny, Tiffany, Hyoyeon, Yuri, Sooyoung, Yoona, and Seohyun. Girls' Generation was originally a nine-piece ensemble; member Jessica departed from the group in September 2014. Among the most influential girl groups in K-pop and a leading figure of the Korean Wave, Girls' Generation has earned numerous accolades and the honorific nickname "The Nation's Girl Group" in their home country.

Girls' Generation debuted on August 5, 2007, with the single "Into the New World" from their eponymous Korean album. The group rose to fame in 2009 with the single "Gee", which claimed the top spot on KBS's Music Bank for a record-breaking nine consecutive weeks and was Melon's most popular song of the 2000s decade. The group cemented their popularity in Asia with follow-up singles "Genie", "Oh!", and "Run Devil Run", which were released between mid-2009 and early 2010. Their second Korean studio album, Oh! (2010), won the Golden Disc award for Album of the Year (Disk Daesang), making the group the first and only female act to win the Album Daesang.

Girls' Generation ventured into the Japanese music scene in 2011 with their eponymous Japanese album, which became the first album by a non-Japanese girl group to be certified million by the RIAJ. The group's third Korean studio album, The Boys, was the best-selling album of 2011 in South Korea. An English version of the title track was released in an attempt to expand the group's endeavor to the global music scene. The group's fourth Korean studio album, I Got a Boy (2013), was supported by the title track, which won Video of the Year at the inaugural YouTube Music Awards. Girls' Generation continued to build upon their popularity with their fifth and sixth Korean studio albums, Lion Heart (2015) and Holiday Night (2017). Following a five-year hiatus to focus on their individual careers, they returned with their seventh Korean studio album Forever 1 (2022).

The group's signature musical styles are characterized as electropop and bubblegum pop, though their sound has varied widely, incorporating various genres including hip hop, R&B, and EDM. In 2017, Billboard honoured Girls' Generation as the "Top K-pop Girl Group of the Past Decade". They are the first Asian girl group to achieve five music videos with over 100 million views on YouTube with "Gee", "I Got a Boy", "The Boys", "Mr. Taxi", and "Oh!". In Japan, they became the first non-Japanese girl group to have three number-one albums on the Oricon Albums Chart, and their three Japanese concert tours attracted a record-breaking 550,000 spectators.

== Name ==
The group's Korean name is So-Nyeo Si-Dae (Korean: 소녀시대; Hanja: 少女時代; RR: Sonyeo Sidae), from the Sino-Korean root meaning "Generation of Girls"; they are also known as SoShi (소시) or SNSD, both of which are abbreviated forms of the group's Korean-language name. Because their name consists of Chinese roots, the group's name is similar in Chinese and Japanese: in Japan the group's name is pronounced as Shōjo Jidai (少女時代), and in Mandarin Chinese as Shàonǚ Shídài (simplified Chinese: 少女时代; traditional Chinese: 少女時代).

== History ==
=== 2000–2008: Formation and debut ===
Prior to the group's debut, some of the members were already involved in the entertainment industry. Yoona had gone through about 200 auditions for music videos, dramas, and movies before becoming a singer for Girls' Generation. Sooyoung was exposed to the Japanese music scene as a member of a pop duo named Route 0, which disbanded one year after its debut in 2002.

The first member of the group to join SM Entertainment's training system was Jessica in 2000, after she and her sister, Krystal Jung, were scouted in a mall in South Korea during a family vacation. That same year, members Sooyoung and Hyoyeon were cast into S.M.'s training system through the 2000 S.M. Open Audition, in which Hyoyeon danced for her audition. Yuri was the next Girls' Generation member to become an S.M. trainee after coming second in the 2001 S.M. Youth Best Dancer competition. Yoona was cast the following year through the 2002 S.M. Saturday Open Casting Audition, where she sang and danced to her favorite singers, BoA and Britney Spears. Seohyun, the group's youngest member, was scouted in the subway by an S.M. scout; she then auditioned in 2003, singing children's songs.

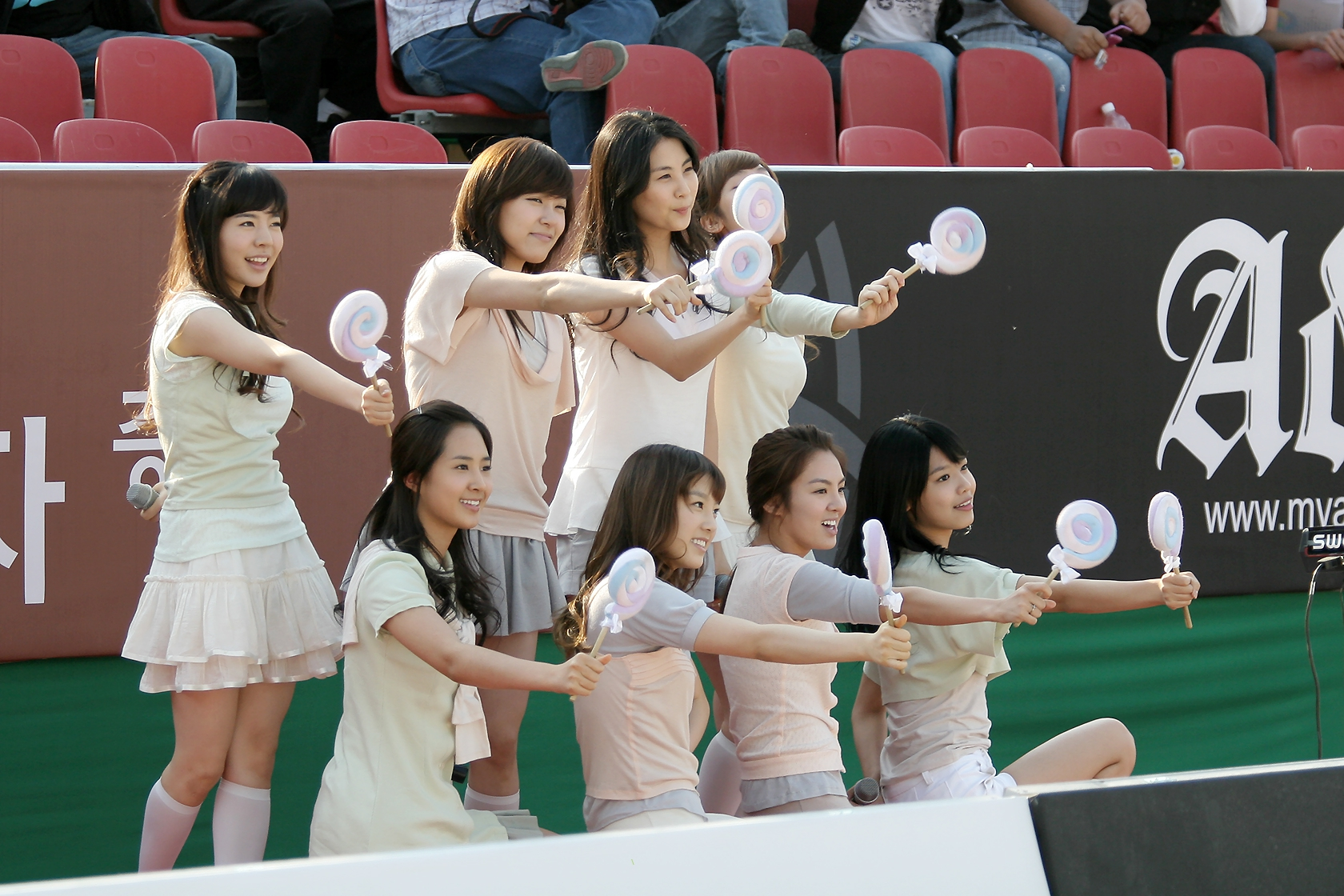
Girls' Generation performing at the 2008 Beach Volleyball Competition at Jamsil Arena in Seoul

The group's leader, Taeyeon, was cast in 2004 after winning first place in the S.M. Youth Singing Competition. That same year, member Tiffany auditioned at S.M.'s Starlight Casting System in Los Angeles, and joined the company in October 2004. The final member of the group to be added was Sunny, who had become an S.M. trainee in 1998 and trained for five years before moving to another company, Starworld. At Starworld, she trained to debut in a duo named Sugar, which never debuted. In 2007, on the recommendation of Korean-Japanese singer IconiQ, Sunny moved back to S.M. Entertainment and became a member of Girls' Generation.

In July 2007, Girls' Generation had their first stage performance on Mnet's School of Rock, where the group performed their first single, "Into the New World" (다시 만난 세계; Dasi mannan segye). On August 5, 2007, the group officially made their debut on SBS's Inkigayo, where they performed the same song. Girls' Generation subsequently released their self-titled debut studio album in November 2007, which was preceded by the singles "Girls' Generation" (소녀시대; Sonyeo sidae)—a remake of Lee Seung-cheol's 1989 song, and "Kissing You". Girls' Generation became the twelfth best-selling album of 2007 in South Korea, selling 56,804 copies. The album has sold over 120,000 copies in the country as of 2009. In March 2008, the album was re-released under the title Baby Baby. The album was preceded by a single with the same name, which was released on digital music sites on March 17, 2008.

=== 2009–2010: Breakthrough and Japanese debut ===
Though Girls' Generation had gained some attention with their 2007 debut album, it was not until 2009 that the group rose to stardom. On January 7, the group released their debut extended play (EP) Gee, which has sold over 100,000 copies in South Korea. Its title track claimed the number-one position on KBS's Music Bank for a record-breaking nine consecutive weeks, becoming the longest-running number-one song on Music Bank until 2012, when Psy's "Gangnam Style" claimed the top spot for ten consecutive weeks. It was the best-selling single of 2009 in South Korea. The group's second EP, Tell Me Your Wish (Genie) (소원을 말해봐; Sowoneul malhaebwa) and its titular lead single were released in June 2009. The EP sold 50,000 copies within its first week in South Korea, and charted at number eight on the Taiwanese G-Music chart. In November 2009, S.M. Entertainment announced the group's first concert tour, Into The New World, whose tickets for the South Korean shows were sold out in three minutes. The tour visited Seoul in December 2009, Shanghai in April 2010, and Taipei in October 2010.

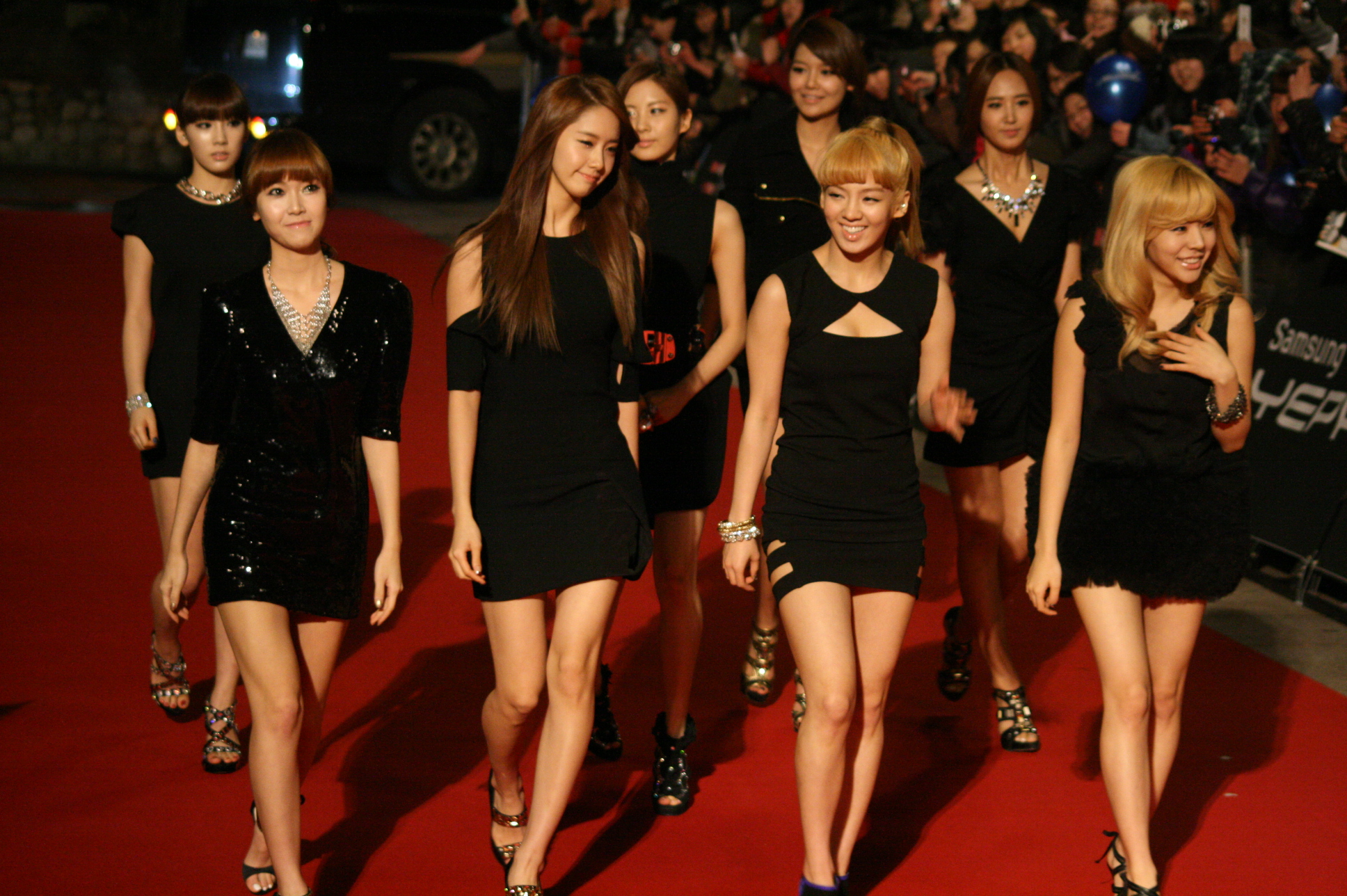
Girls' Generation attending the 2010 Golden Disk Awards

Girls' Generation's second studio album, Oh!, was released in January 2010. The album peaked atop South Korea's Gaon Album Chart and has sold over 240,000 copies in South Korea. The album's title track peaked atop South Korea's Gaon Digital Chart and was the second best-selling digital single of 2010 in the country, selling over 3.3 million copies. Oh! was re-released under the title Run Devil Run in March 2010, which also reached number one on the Gaon Album Chart. Its titular single reached the top spot on the Gaon Digital Chart. Oh! and Run Devil Run were the second and fourth best-selling albums of 2010, respectively.

In mid-2010, Girls' Generation signed with Nayutawave Records (now EMI Records Japan), a division of Universal Music Japan, to venture out to the Japanese music scene. Their debut release was a DVD titled New Beginning of Girls' Generation, released in August 2011, which features seven of the group's music videos and a special bonus footage. The DVD debuted at number four on the Japanese Oricon DVD Chart on August 23, 2010, making Girls' Generation the first Korean girl group to earn a top-five DVD on the Oricon chart. It was certified gold by the Recording Industry Association of Japan (RIAJ). On August 25, 2010, the group performed to 22,000 fans at their first showcase in the country. In September 2010, Girls' Generation released the Japanese version of "Genie" as their debut single in Japan. It peaked at number four on the Japanese Oricon Singles Chart and was certified platinum by the RIAJ. The following month, the group released their second Japanese single, "Gee", which reached number two on the Oricon Singles Chart. "Gee" became the first single by a non-Japanese girl group to enter the top three of the Oricon chart since 1980. It sold 207,000 copies and achieved a million certification for sales of one million units by the RIAJ. Amidst their Japanese activities, they also participated in the SMTown Live '10 World Tour alongside their labelmates, which started on August 21 at Seoul Jamsil Olympic Stadium.

Girls' Generation's third Korean EP Hoot (훗; Hut) was released in October 2010. It charted atop the Gaon Album Chart and at number two on the Oricon Album Chart, and became the third best-selling album of 2010 in South Korea. The title track debuted atop the Gaon Digital Chart. At the 2010 and 2011 Seoul Music Awards, the group won two consecutive Artist of the Year awards, becoming the fourth South Korean act and the first girl group to do so.

=== 2011–2012: Japanese success, The Boys, and international expansion ===
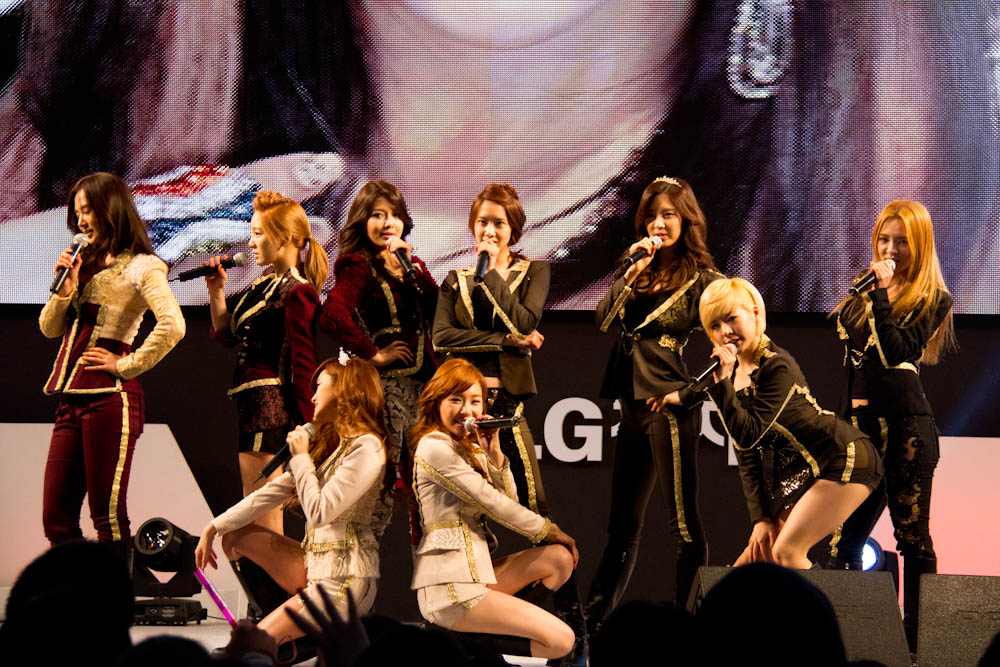
Girls' Generation performing "The Boys" at the 2012 LG Cinema 3D World Festival

Girls' Generation continued their success in Japan with the single "Mr. Taxi", released in April 2011. The single peaked at number two on the Oricon Singles Chart and as of April 2017, was certified Million by the RIAJ. After releasing three singles in Japan, their debut eponymous Japanese studio album was released in June 2011. To promote the album, Girls' Generation embarked on The 1st Japan Arena Tour starting in Osaka on May 31, 2011; the tour attracted 140,000 people in total and generated an estimated ₩20 billion in sales. The album was met with tremendous success in Japan, peaking atop the Japanese Oricon Albums Chart and becoming the first album by a foreign girl group to top the Oricon chart. Within its first month of release, Girls' Generation sold 500,000 copies and earned a double platinum certification by the Recording Industry Association of Japan. The album became the fifth and fifteenth best-selling album in Japan in 2011 in 2012 respectively, with total sales figures of 871,097 copies. A repackaged version titled The Boys was released in December 2011 and peaked at number five on the Oricon Albums Chart. In May 2012, Girls' Generation was certified million by the RIAJ, denoting shipments of one million copies in the country—it became the first album by a South Korean girl group and the second by a South Korean act to earn such achievement. The album won the award for Album of the Year at the 2012 MTV Video Music Awards Japan. Following their successful Japanese debut, the group was regarded as the most popular K-pop girl group in Japan alongside Kara and both became the first Korean girl groups to appear at Kōhaku Uta Gassen.

Girls' Generation's third Korean studio album, The Boys, was released in October 2011. The album was released in the United States by Interscope Records, marking Girls' Generation's debut album in the country. To help The Boys connect with audiences worldwide, the group made their debut on US television upon performing on Late Show with David Letterman on January 31 and Live! with Kelly on February 1. They also performed on French television show Le Grand Journal on February 9. The Boys was commercially successful in the group's home country, having sold over 460,000 copies and becoming the highest-selling album of 2011. The lead single, "The Boys", peaked atop the Gaon Digital Chart and sold over 3.03 million copies in 2011. The group's endeavor to the United States, meanwhile, was met with limited success; The Boys entered the Billboard Top Heatseekers at number 17 and sold 21,000 copies.

In June 2012, Girls' Generation released their fourth Japanese single, "Paparazzi", which reached number two on the Japanese Oricon Singles Chart and was certified Gold by the RIAJ. According to SoundScan Japan, the single sold 103,000 copies within its first month of release. Three months later, the group released their fifth Japanese single "Oh!", which was their first number-one single on the Oricon Singles Chart, and achieved a gold certification by the RIAJ. Girls' Generation released their second Japanese album, Girls & Peace, in November, which sold 116,963 copies within its first week of release and peaked at number two on the Oricon Albums Chart. It was subsequently certified platinum by the RIAJ and became the forty-first best-selling album of 2012 in Japan with 141,259 copies sold. The album was further preceded by a single titled "Flower Power".

=== 2012–2014: I Got a Boy, worldwide recognition, and Jessica's departure ===
In December 2012, Girls' Generation released "Dancing Queen"—a remake of British singer Duffy's "Mercy" (2008)—as the lead single from their then-upcoming 2013 Korean studio album. On New Year's Day of 2013, the group released their fourth Korean studio album titled I Got a Boy, and held an MBC special television program, Girls' Generation's Romantic Fantasy. The album peaked atop the Gaon Album Chart; and Billboard's World Albums Chart. The title track reached number one on Billboard's Korea K-Pop Hot 100 and the Gaon Digital Chart, and sold over 1.35 million copies. Its music video won Video of the Year at the inaugural YouTube Music Awards in 2013, beating other popular nominees including Psy and Justin Bieber. This attracted attention from Western media outlets as the group was considered lesser-known compared to other candidates at the time.

In February 2013, Girls' Generation embarked on the Girls & Peace: 2nd Japan Tour, which started in Kobe on February 9. The accompanying DVD was released in September 2013 and topped the Oricon DVD Chart. The group's first world tour, Girls' Generation World Tour Girls & Peace, spanned from June 2013 to February 2014 and consisted of ten concerts in seven Asian countries. Girls' Generation released a remix album titled Best Selection Non Stop Mix in March, and a live album titled 2011 Girls' Generation Tour in April 2013. The former charted at number six on the Oricon Albums Chart, while the latter peaked at number one on the Gaon Album Chart. Girls' Generation's third Japanese studio album, Love & Peace, was released in December 2013. The album debuted at number one on the Oricon Albums Chart and was certified gold by the RIAJ. The album spawned two singles: "Love & Girls" and "Galaxy Supernova", charting at numbers four and three on the Oricon Singles Chart, respectively.

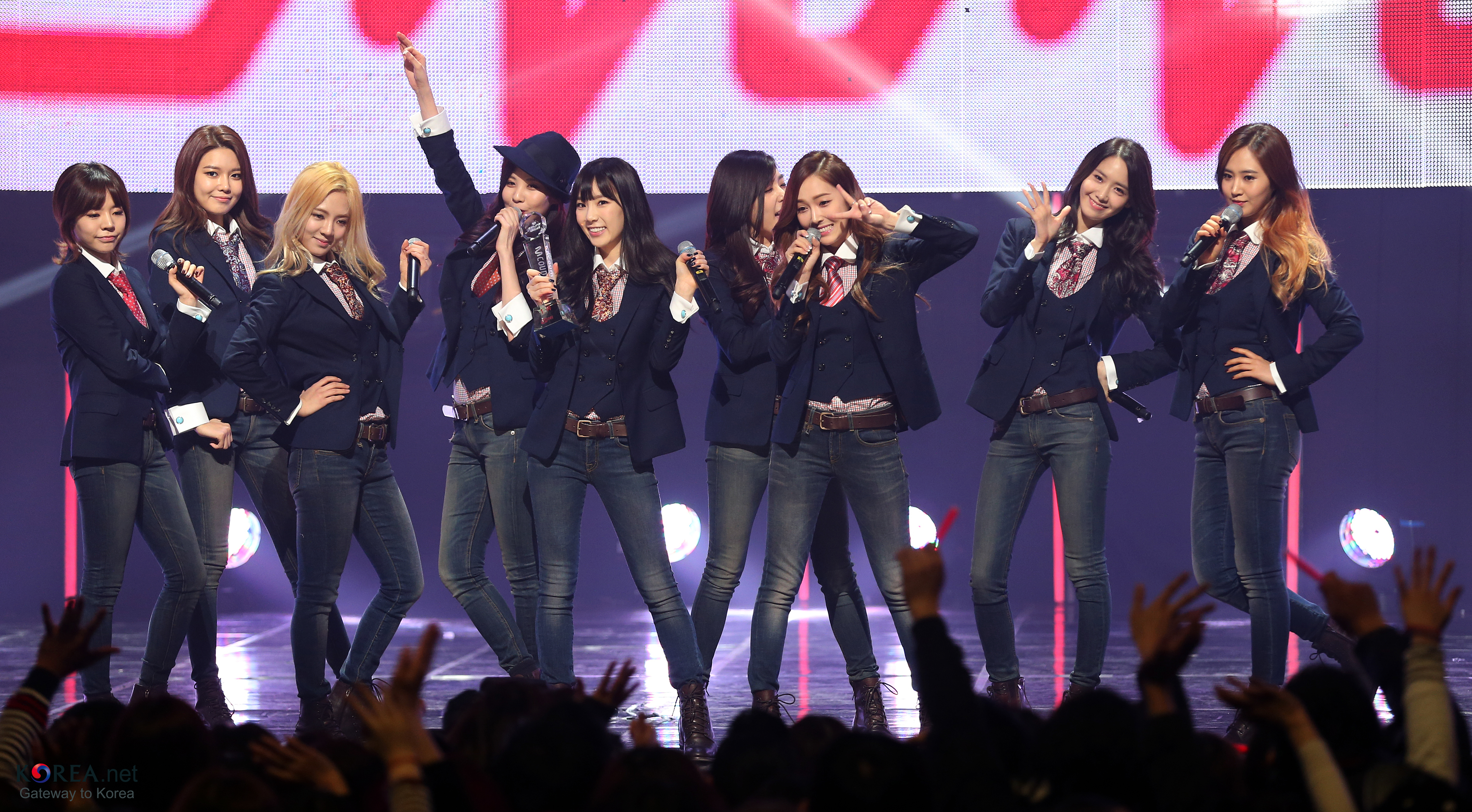
Girls' Generation promoting "Mr.Mr" on M Countdown

Girls' Generation's fourth Korean EP, Mr.Mr, released in February 2014, reached number one in South Korea. With sales of over 163,000 copies, the EP was the 5th highest-album of the year in South Korea. In the United States, the EP debuted at number 110 on the Billboard 200 with first-week sales of 3,000 copies. The title track was a number-one single on the Gaon Digital Chart and sold over 900,000 units. In July 2014, the group released their first Japanese greatest hits album, The Best, which is composed of the group's previous singles and four new tracks. It topped the Oricon Albums Chart for two consecutive weeks and has sold over 175,000 copies in Japan. With The Best reaching number one in Japan, Girls' Generation became the first non-Japanese female group in Asia to have three number-one albums in the country. They also completed their third concert tour in Japan, Love & Peace, within that month. The group's three Japanese concert tours attracted 550,000 spectators in total, setting the record for a K-pop girl group.

On September 30, 2014, member Jessica announced that she had been dismissed from the group. SM Entertainment confirmed her departure, stating Jessica was no longer a member of Girls' Generation due to conflicts between her and the group's schedules. Girls' Generation continued to promote as an eight-member group thereafter. During an event held in the same day in Shenzhen, the members were visibly emotional. The next day, the group's leader Taeyeon apologised to their fans, saying "From the start, we've only wanted to protect Girls' Generation ... Please believe in us one more time".

The remaining eight members proceeded with the group's activities, holding The Best Live concert at Tokyo Dome on December 9, 2014. The concert was a sellout and attracted 50,000 spectators. The recorded show was released as a DVD in April 2015, which topped both Oricon's DVD and Blu-ray charts simultaneously.

=== 2015–2021: Lion Heart, Holiday Night, and hiatus ===
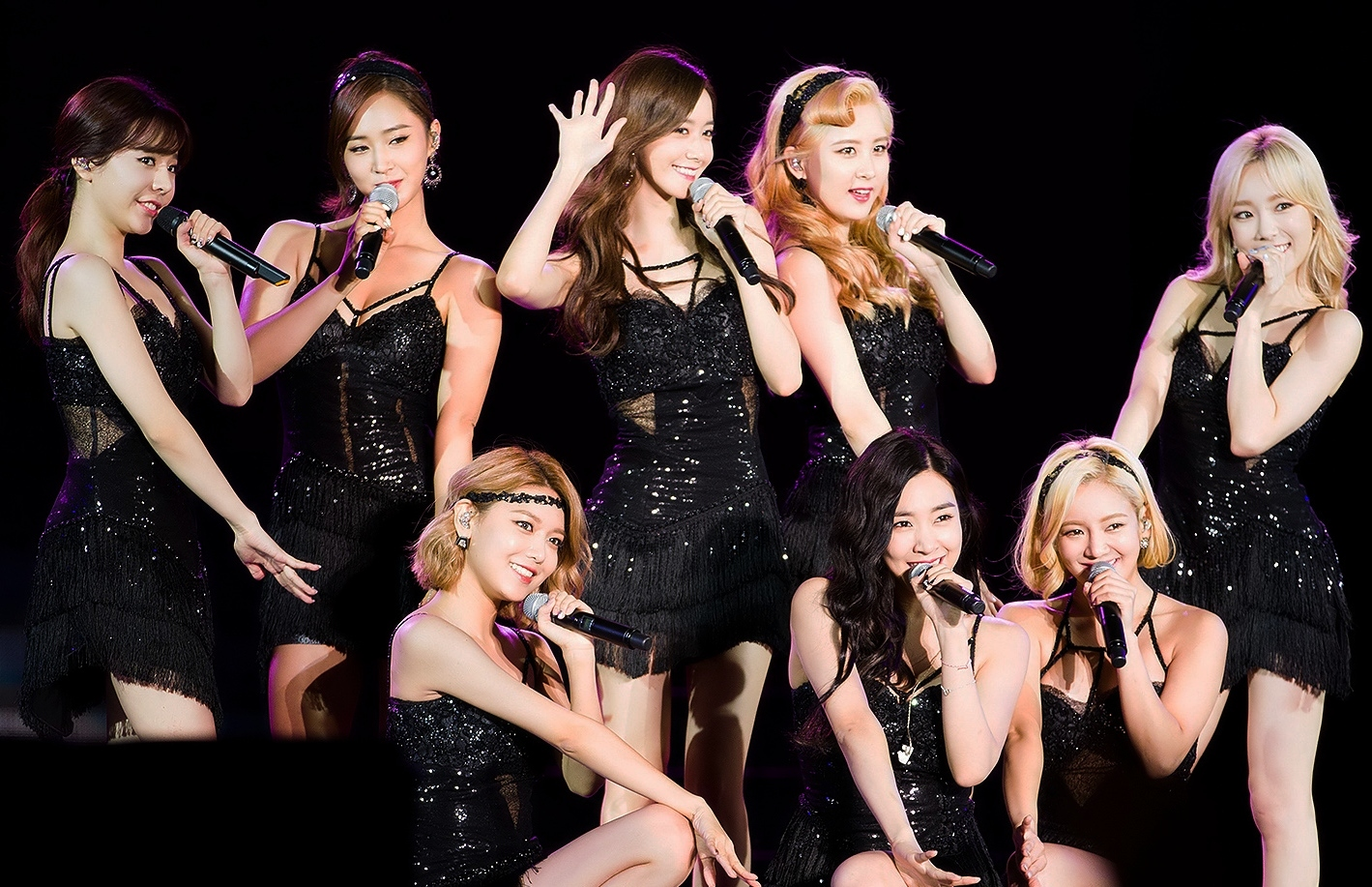
Girls' Generation performing at the DMC Festival in 2015

Girls' Generation's first release as an eight-member group was "Catch Me If You Can", released in March 2015. It was recorded in both Korean and Japanese; the Korean version was released worldwide on April 10, while the Japanese version was released on April 22, 2015. It peaked at number 19 in South Korea and number eight in Japan.

The group's first album as an eight-member group, their fifth Korean studio album Lion Heart, was released on August 19, 2015. The album reached number one in South Korea, and at number 11 in Japan. The album sold over 145,000 copies in 2015. It produced three singles; the lead single "Party" reached number one on the Gaon Digital Chart, and number ten on the Japan Hot 100. Following the release of "Party", Girls' Generation appeared on the Billboard Social 50 at number 44 on August 1, 2015. The following week, the group's position on the chart rose to number 22. The follow-up singles "Lion Heart" and "You Think" were made available in conjunction with the release of the album. They charted at numbers four and 30 on the Gaon Digital Chart, respectively.

To promote the album, the group starred in a South Korean reality television program titled Channel Girls' Generation. They embarked on Girls' Generation's Phantasia, a concert tour which started on November 21, 2015, in Seoul. With this achievement, Girls' Generation became the first South Korean girl group to hold a fourth concert tour. The group also concurrently embarked on their 4th Japan Tour, which commenced on December 12, 2015, at Nagoya. The Gaon Music Chart announced that Girls' Generation was the most successful girl group of South Korea in 2015. In August 2016, to commemorate the group's ninth anniversary, S.M. Entertainment released a single titled "Sailing (0805)". The lyrics were written by member Sooyoung, highlighting the relationship between the group and their fans.

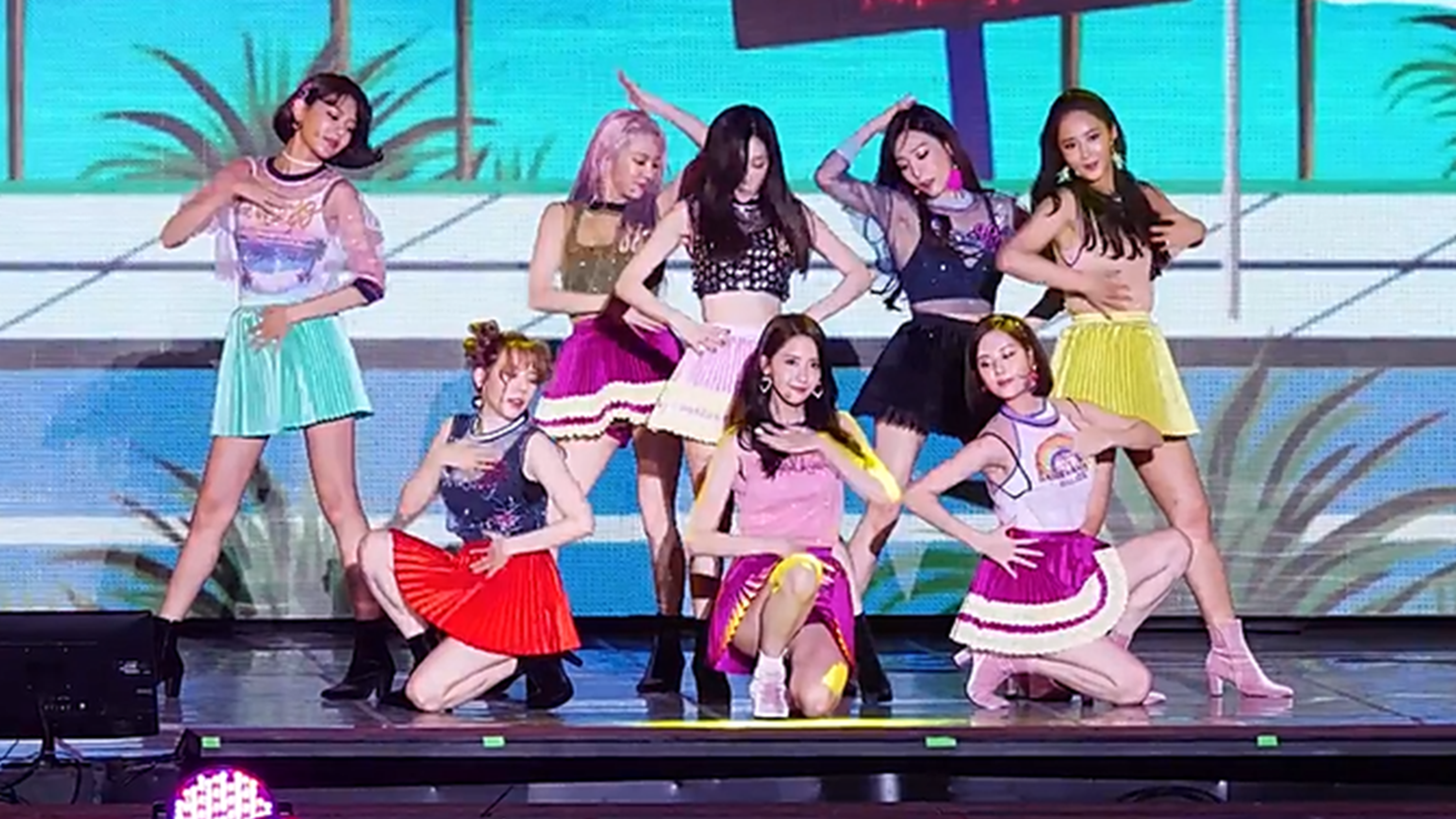
Girls' Generation performing at the 2017 DMC Peace Concert

In July 2017, Girls' Generation announced the release of their sixth Korean-language studio album to commemorate the group's tenth anniversary. The album, titled Holiday Night, was released on August 7, 2017. It debuted atop the Billboard World Albums chart, and peaked at number two on the Gaon Album Chart. The album surpassed The Boys as Girls' Generation's fastest-selling Korean-language album in the first week, and sold over 167,000 copies by the end of 2017.

In October 2017, Tiffany, Sooyoung, and Seohyun left SM Entertainment on the condition that the group remains together. With the group on an extended hiatus, all members primarily focused on their solo careers. Girls' Generation reunited in September 2021 with an appearance on variety show You Quiz on the Block, which marked their first group activity in four years.

=== 2022–present: 15th anniversary reunion, and Forever 1 ===
In May 2022, SM Entertainment announced that Girls' Generation would have a full-group comeback for their fifteenth anniversary, ending their five-year hiatus. To commence the anniversary promotion, the group took part in an 8-episode reality show, Soshi TamTam, which began airing on JTBC in July. Their seventh Korean-language studio album, Forever 1, was released in August 2022, peaking at number two on the Circle Chart. The group performed at the SM Town Live 2022 concert during the same month, and also held a sold-out special event "Long Lasting Love" in September 2022.

In August 2023, Sunny left SM Entertainment after her exclusive contract with the company ended. Girls' Generation recorded a cover of The Grace's 2006 single "My Everything", which was included on SM Town's album 2025 SM Town: The Culture, the Future, released on February 14, 2025. Yuri left SM Entertainment in September 2026 after her contract with the company concluded, following twenty-five years with SM since she was a trainee.

== Subgroups and solo endeavors ==
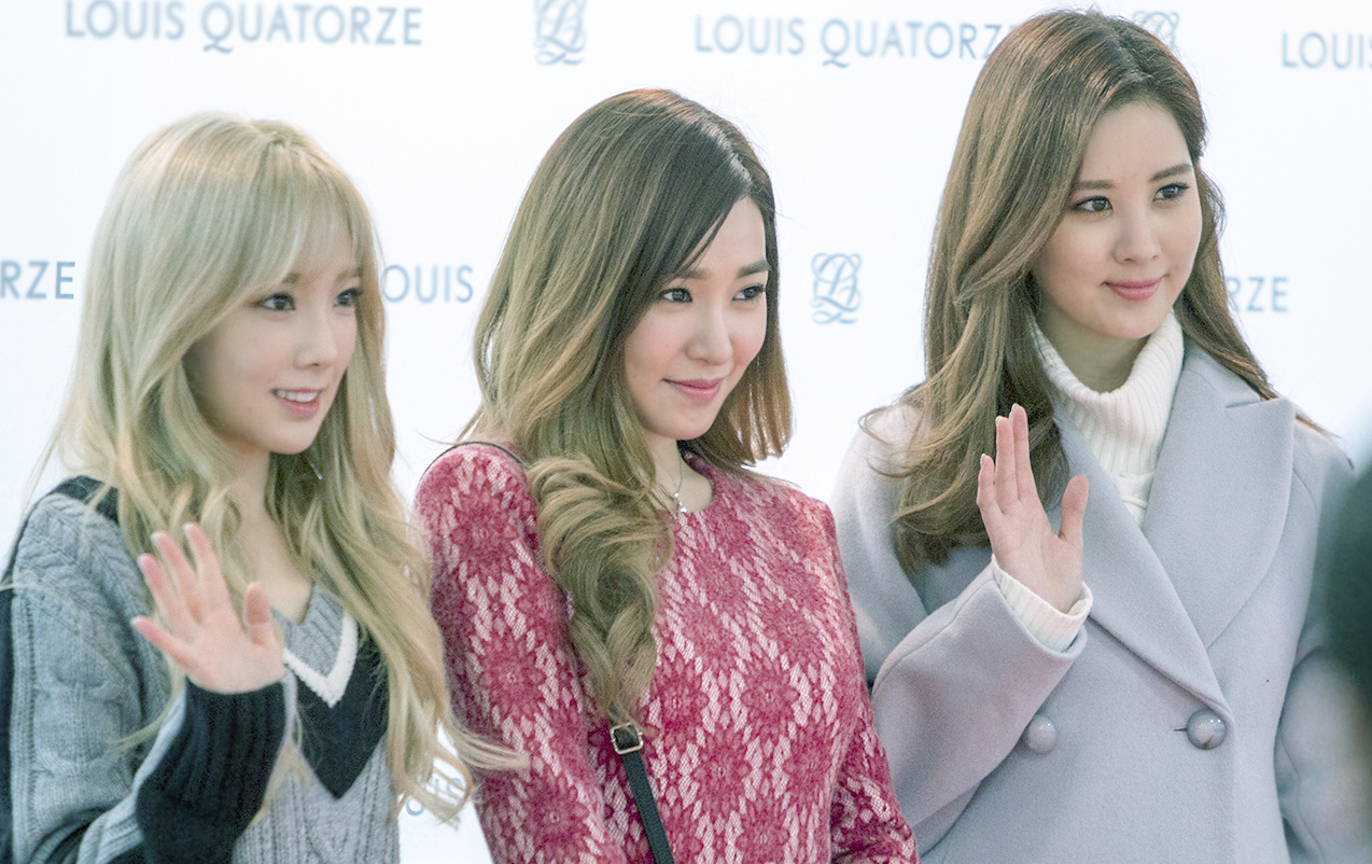
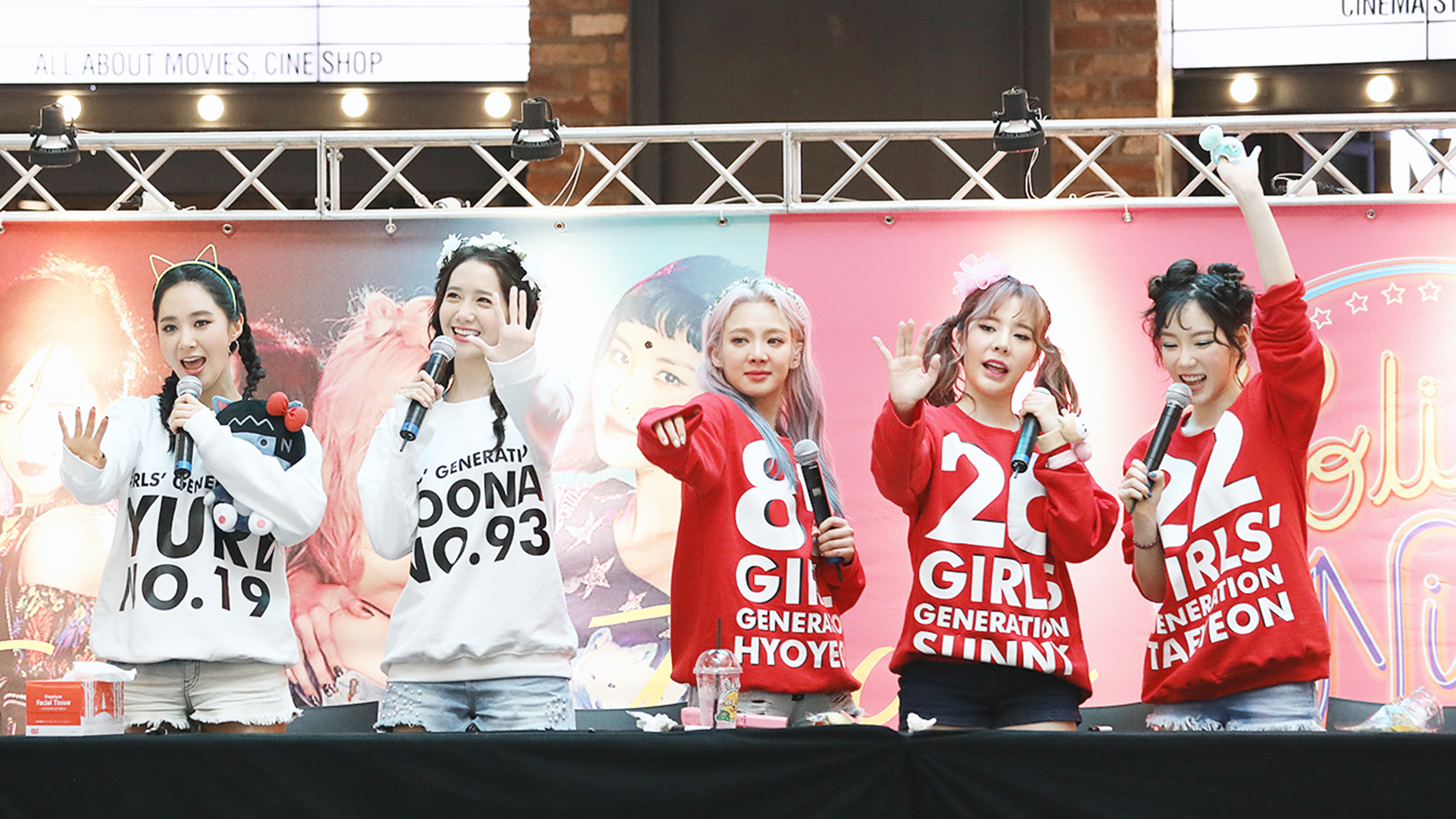
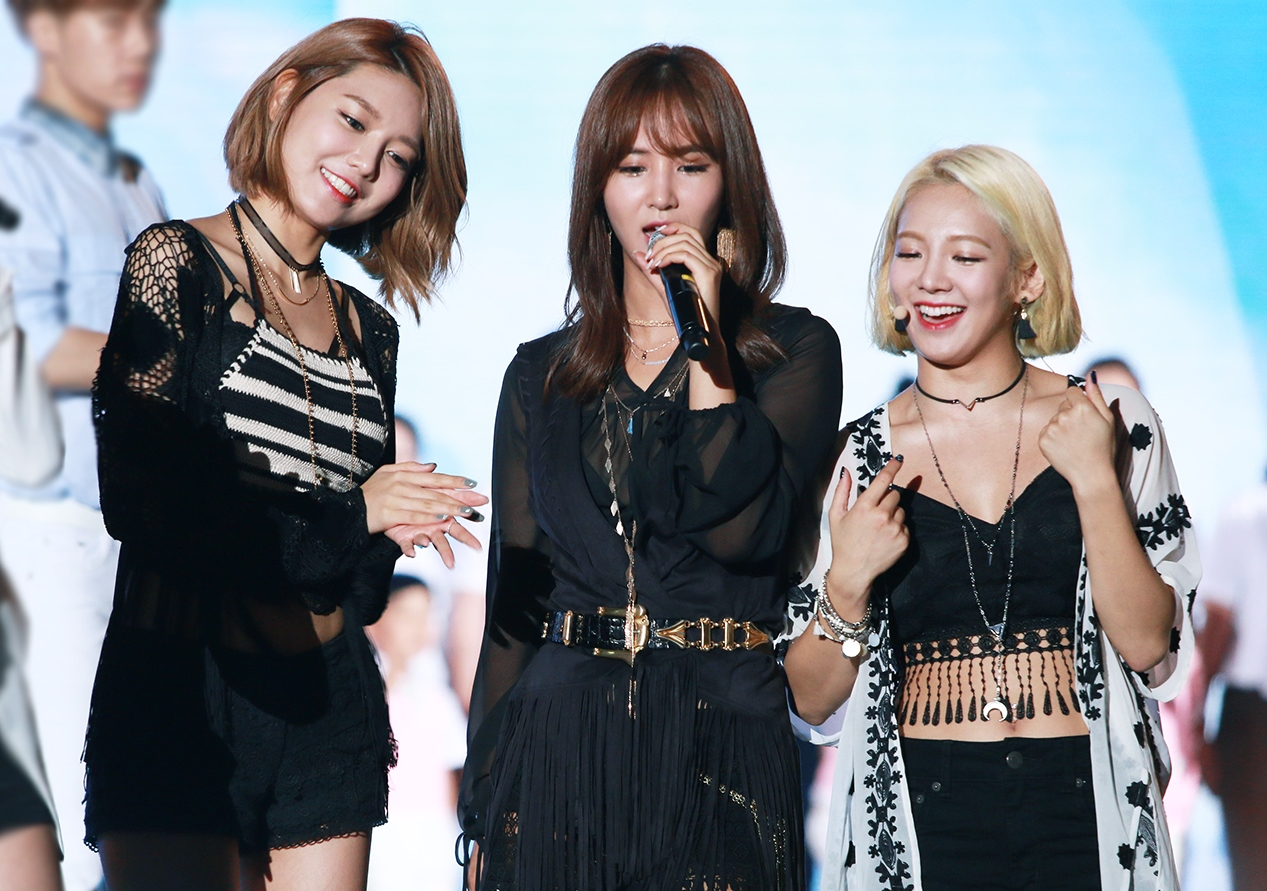
From top to bottom: TaeTiSeo in 2015, Oh!GG in 2017, and HyoRiSoo in 2015

In April 2012, SM Entertainment formed a subgroup of Girls' Generation named TTS (or TaeTiSeo), composed of three members: Taeyeon, Tiffany, and Seohyun. TTS has released three extended plays: Twinkle (May 2012), Holler (September 2014), and Dear Santa (December 2015). In August 2018, SM Entertainment formed the second subgroup of Girls' Generation named Girls' Generation-Oh!GG, composed of five members: Sunny, Taeyeon, Yoona, Yuri and Hyoyeon. They released their debut single album, Lil' Touch, on September 5. In August 2026, SM Entertainment formed the third subgroup of Girls' Generation named Girls' Generation-HRS (or HyoRiSoo), composed of three members: Hyoyeon, Yuri, and Sooyoung. The sub-unit originated from Fake Kim Hyoyeon, a comedy mockumentary series on Hyoyeon's YouTube channel Hyo's Level Up. They released their debut single, "Skibidi" on August 31.

Taeyeon was the first member of Girls' Generation to debut as a solo singer; her debut EP I was released in October 2015, which peaked at number two on the Gaon Album Chart. Taeyeon's second EP, Why (2016), peaked atop the Gaon Album Chart. She has released three studio albums, My Voice (2017), Purpose (2019), and INVU (2022), five more Korean extended plays, two Japanese extended plays, and a greatest hits album, Panorama: The Best of Taeyeon (2025). Tiffany was the second member to debut as a solo singer, releasing her debut EP I Just Wanna Dance in May 2016. After leaving SM Entertainment, Tiffany released her second EP, Lips on Lips, in February 2019, and a studio album, Edge of Calm, in August 2026 Seohyun followed with her debut EP, Don't Say No, in January 2017. Yuri and Yoona also released their debut EPs titled The First Scene (2018) and A Walk to Remember (2019), respectively. Since 2016, Hyoyeon has also released several solo singles both under her given name and her DJ moniker Hyo. In May 2022, Hyoyeon released her debut EP Deep. In December 2018, Sooyoung released "Winter Breath", her first solo single since departing from SM Entertainment.

Since 2017, the members began exploring their individual careers and have branched out into various entertainment fields. The range of activities include roles in movies, dramas and plays, variety shows appearances, starting personal YouTube channels, and also continuing to release music individually. By 2020, the diversity of their projects has been declared as an ideal example of growth for a veteran girl group. In particular, Yoona, Sooyoung, Yuri and Seohyun have received attention for their growth and diversity as actresses. Moreover, Girls' Generation is also recognized for continuing to support each other despite their solo activities.

== Artistry ==
=== Musical styles ===
"Gee" (2009)
"Gee" is a bubblegum pop and electropop song that is widely recognized as the "magnum opus" (literally the greatest) for modern Korean bubblegum pop genre.

"I Got a Boy" (2013)
The group's 2013 single "I Got a Boy" is described as an eclectic mix of various genres including electropop and drum and bass.

"We don't have any desire now to create a popular song like "Gee". Of course if that happened, we would be perfectly happy, but what we continue to strive for is performance. Girls' Generation's key advantage as a group is performance and vocal line so we worry a lot over songs that will fulfill both of these areas."

— Member Sooyoung discussing the group's music styles in May 2015

Girls' Generation's music is predominantly bubblegum pop and electropop. The group's early singles such as "Gee", "Tell Me Your Wish (Genie)" (2009), and "Oh!" (2010) are described as "cutesy" bubblegum pop; "Gee" also features elements of techno and hip hop, as noted by Abigail Covington from The A.V. Club. Nevertheless, the group's musical styles have varied widely ever since; Anzhe Zhang from the New York University wrote that despite the fact that Girls' Generation's styles are deemed "mainstream" in South Korea, the group "has grown sonically more experimental".

Their 2011 single "The Boys" departs for a more "mature" style from the group's previous emphasis on "cutesy" themes; it incorporates elements from hip hop, a genre that Girls' Generation had never ventured into. The titular studio album, according to AllMusic's reviewer Tim Sendra, includes uptempo dance tracks "with a straight pop radio feel". Girls' Generation's 2012 single "Dancing Queen"—a remake of British singer Duffy's "Mercy" (2008)—features a "funky pop" production, as opposed to the group's signature electropop sound. Their 2013 single "I Got a Boy" was noted for its eclectic musical style, utilizing various genres ranging from bubblegum pop, electropop and drum and bass to pop-rap, EDM, and dubstep. Jeff Benjamin from Billboard lauded the song as "one of the most-forward thinking lead pop singles heard in any country". Both aforementioned singles' parent album, I Got a Boy (2013), combines elements from a wide range of genres such as 1980s new wave, EDM, and classic and contemporary R&B.

Girls' Generation's 2014 EP, Mr.Mr., features "exciting" R&B sounds with "cool, simple" melodies. AllMusic's Heather Phares also noted inspirations of EDM, hip hop, traditional K-pop sound, and late-1980s europop on the EP, which she labelled "a set of songs that offers something for every kind of Girls' Generation and expands their musical reach". The group's 2015 album Lion Heart brings back their signature bubblegum pop sound; its third single "You Think", however, is a hip hop song that incorporates trap beats in its instrumentation.

=== Lyrics and themes ===
Although most Girls' Generation's releases are written by songwriters for S.M. Entertainment, some members occasionally participated in songwriting. Member Yuri wrote the lyrics for "Mistake" from their 2010 EP Hoot. Sooyoung penned the lyrics to "How Great Is Your Love" on the group's 2011 studio album The Boys. Members Sooyoung, Yuri, and Seohyun wrote the lyrics for "Baby Maybe" and "XYZ" on the group's 2013 studio album I Got a Boy.

The group's main lyrical themes as characterized by Chris True from AllMusic are "dance party" and "girls night out". Girls' Generation's songs have been criticized by Western media outlets for not portraying female empowerment but promoting the opposite. Ceejay Lee from feminist magazine Fem criticized the "generic" themes of Korean girl groups like Wonder Girls or Girls' Generation as "sexist": "[They] infantilize themselves to emasculate males by pandering childlike, puritanical innocence [...] It only reinforces that females are weak beings that serve to gratify males and that males need to be "man" enough to "protect" them". Stephen Epstein from the Victoria University of Wellington and James Turnbull from Dongseo University expressed concern that the lyrics of K-pop girl groups may raise considerable questions about the empowering nature of "Girl Group Fever"—particularly with singles "Gee" and "Oh!"

Several of Girls' Generation's songs, such as "Run Devil Run", "Hoot", and "Bad Girl" (from their 2011 eponymous Japanese album) are noted for portraying "confident young women with their own opinion", which is a departure from their early singles. The group's 2011 single "The Boys" was noted for conveying a feminist theme and was compared to Beyoncé's 2011 single "Run the World (Girls)" for the same "women-powered" content; Eun-Young Jun in the book The Korean Wave: Korean Media Go Global (2013) noted its lyrics for depicting "sexually daring women" who are confident in their sexuality.

=== Image ===
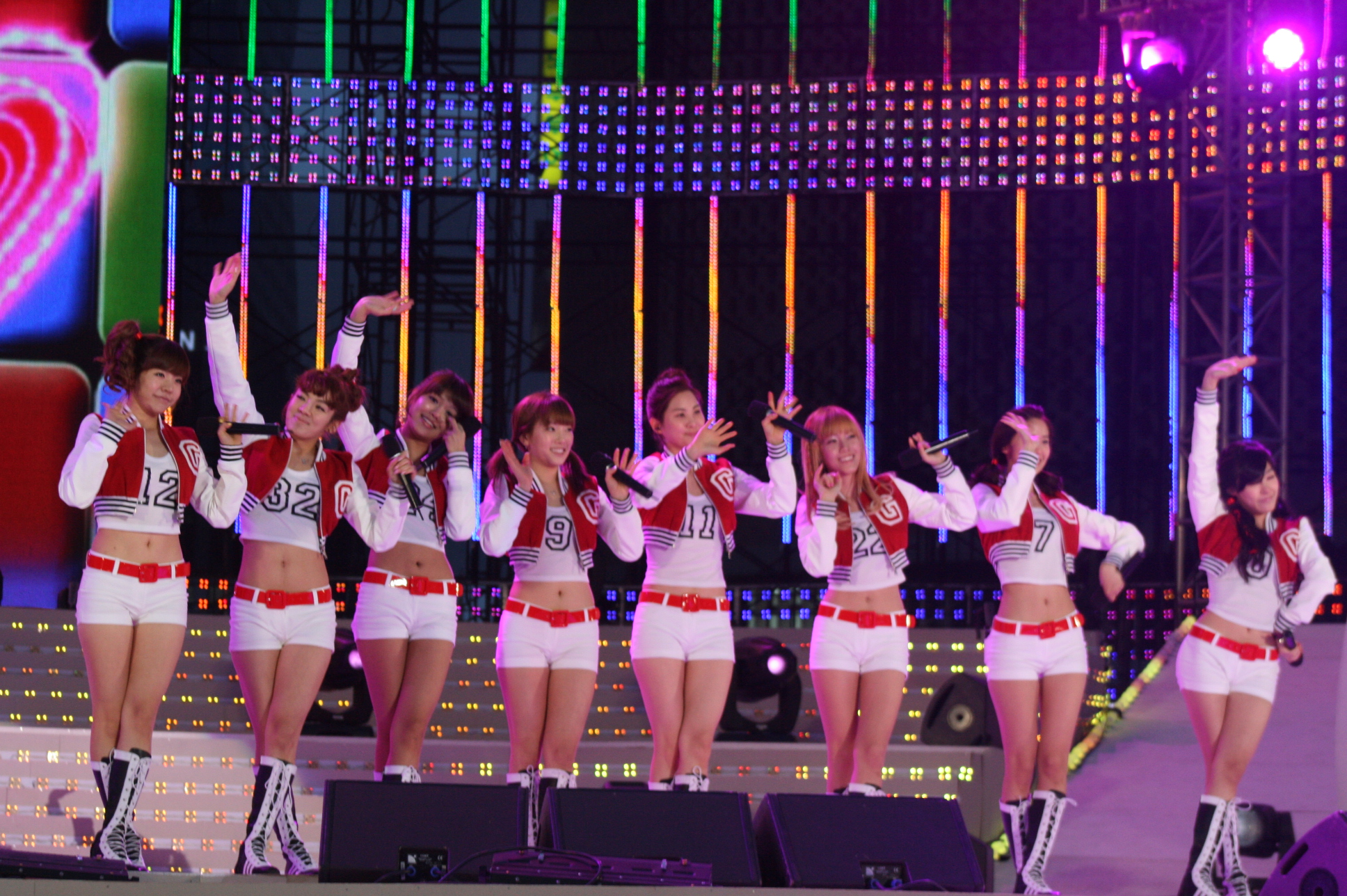
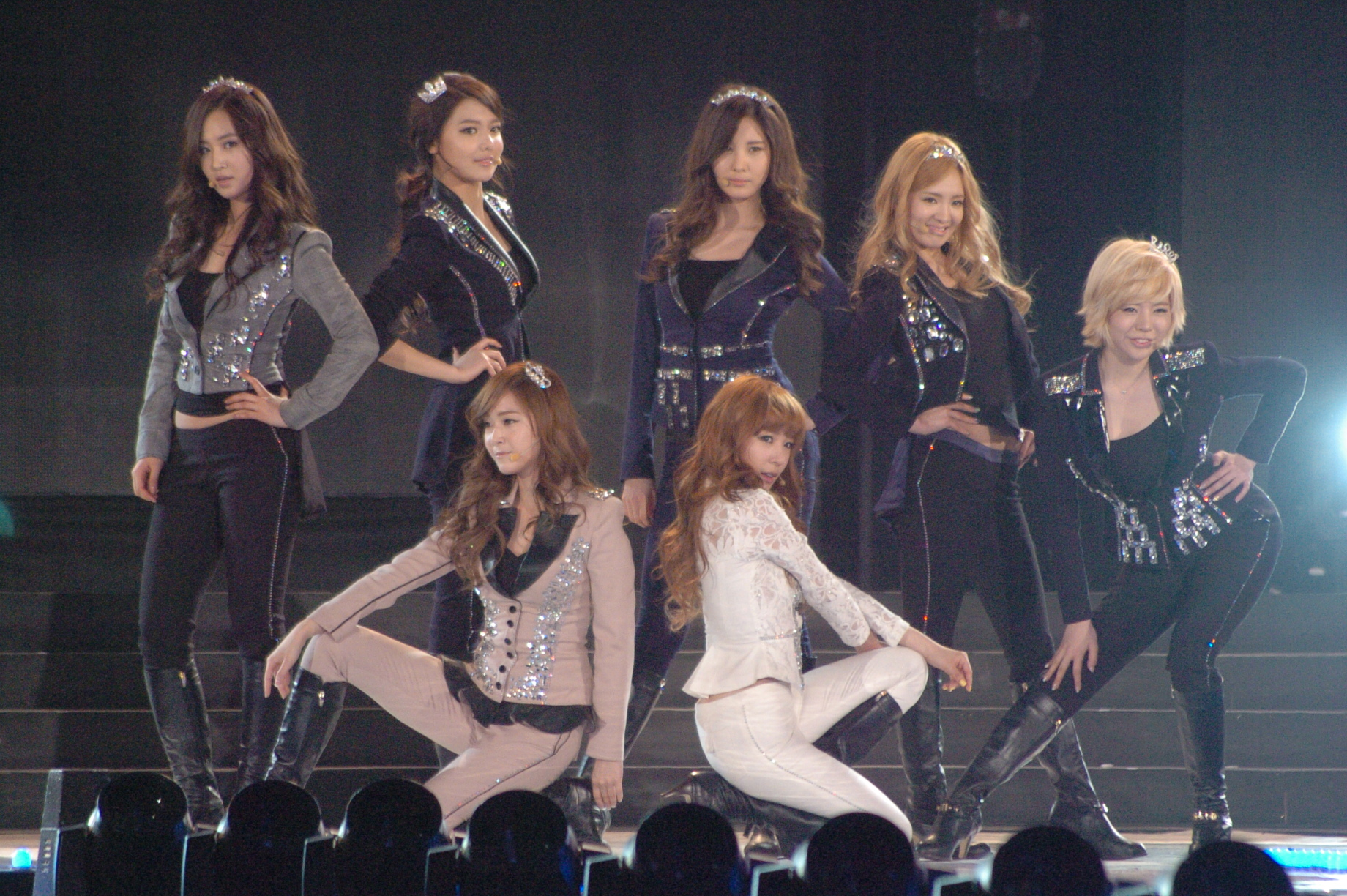
Girls' Generation was known for synchronized choreography in uniforms (left: 2010's "Oh!") in their early years, and later switched to a more mature image, choosing their own outfits (right: 2011's "The Boys").

Girls' Generation is known for reinventing their fashion styles and stage performances throughout their career. In their early years, the group performed in uniforms; with the debut single "Into the New World", they introduced themselves as high school students. In 2009, the group set the "colorful skinny jeans" fashion trend with "Gee", and later opted for a marine-inspired image on wearing uniforms and shorts that highlighted their legs with "Tell Me Your Wish (Genie)". In 2010, the group's image became more diverse: they used a cheerleader concept for "Oh!", while the performances of their 2010 single "Run Devil Run" was noted for conveying a darker theme, which was billed "Black SoShi". Later that year, the group transformed themselves to Bond Girls-inspired singers for the visual of "Hoot". In 2011, the group established a "heroine" image, with members choosing their own outfits, emphasizing each of the members' own tastes rather than performing in uniforms. For the performances of "I Got a Boy" (2013), the members opted for flat shoes instead of their signature high heels in order to perform the choreography correctly. Girls' Generation's visuals for their 2015 singles "Catch Me If You Can" and "You Think" were noted for intricate choreography moves with a more "powerful" and "sexy" image.

Girls' Generation's image has often been regarded as "innocent", and their performances onstage are described as "youthful" and "colorful;" Ceejay Lee from Fem commented that Girls' Generation's outfits often reveal legs rather than "cleavages or derrières". Eun-Young Jung in the book The Korean Wave opined that the group's concepts fall into two main categories—"innocent, cutesy, happy" (early singles "Gee", "Genie", "Oh!") and "more mature, yet not overly sexy, feminine" (later singles "Run Devil Run" and "Hoot"). A writer for the Korean Culture and Information Service deemed the group's image as "sexy" and "girly" "goddesses that are hard to approach". John Seabrook from The New Yorker described Girls' Generation as "a group of preppy-looking young women in skinny trousers. When they wear hot pants, it's to display the gams, not the glutes". New York Magazine stated: "according to label executives and fans, [Girls' Generation's] appeal is not their music, which is catchy but derivative. Instead, the [group projects] a humility that gives their fans the illusion that 'when you see them on stage it's like they've come to see you.' " Taylor Glasby from Dazed remarked that not only the group's early "pure" image and music were appealing, but the members' personalities as a whole "uniquely solidified the GG experience into an intimate family affair", noting that their supporters look up to all the members as "sisters, role models and icons". Discussing the public's scrutiny on the group's physical image, member Tiffany remarked:

At first it always bothers you even though you say it doesn't. But I think if you want to exceed limits, you have to suck that all in and be happy with what you have. At first, it was painful to watch all those things but now I take it as constructive criticism or I don't bother to look at it.

== Legacy ==
"We always said this among ourselves in the beginning. Popularity, like the seasons, comes and goes around. If it's spring for one of us, let's not get conceited. What's important is not individual popularity, but the longevity of our team. When each and every one of us does well, Girls' Generation will do well."

— Member Sunny discussing the group's view on their popularity

Girls' Generation has been regarded as a prominent figure in South Korean culture and the Korean wave. Their immense popularity in South Korea has earned the group the titles "The Nation's Singers" (국민가수; Gukmin gasu) and "The Nation's Girl Group" (국민걸그룹; gukmin geolgeurup). In South Korea, they are credited as the lead female group that shifted the public's focus back to female idols after the Korean music industry experienced an influx of male idol groups from 2002 to 2007. CNN noted the group as a "national phenomenon" in South Korea and labelled them the "Asian version" of British girl group Spice Girls, and Tyler Brûlé writing for the Financial Times selected the group as one of the ten most recognizable features of South Korea in 2011; they were the only musical act to make the list. Japanese magazine Nikkei Business suggested the group's international expansion and success was the musical equivalent to Samsung's global trend.

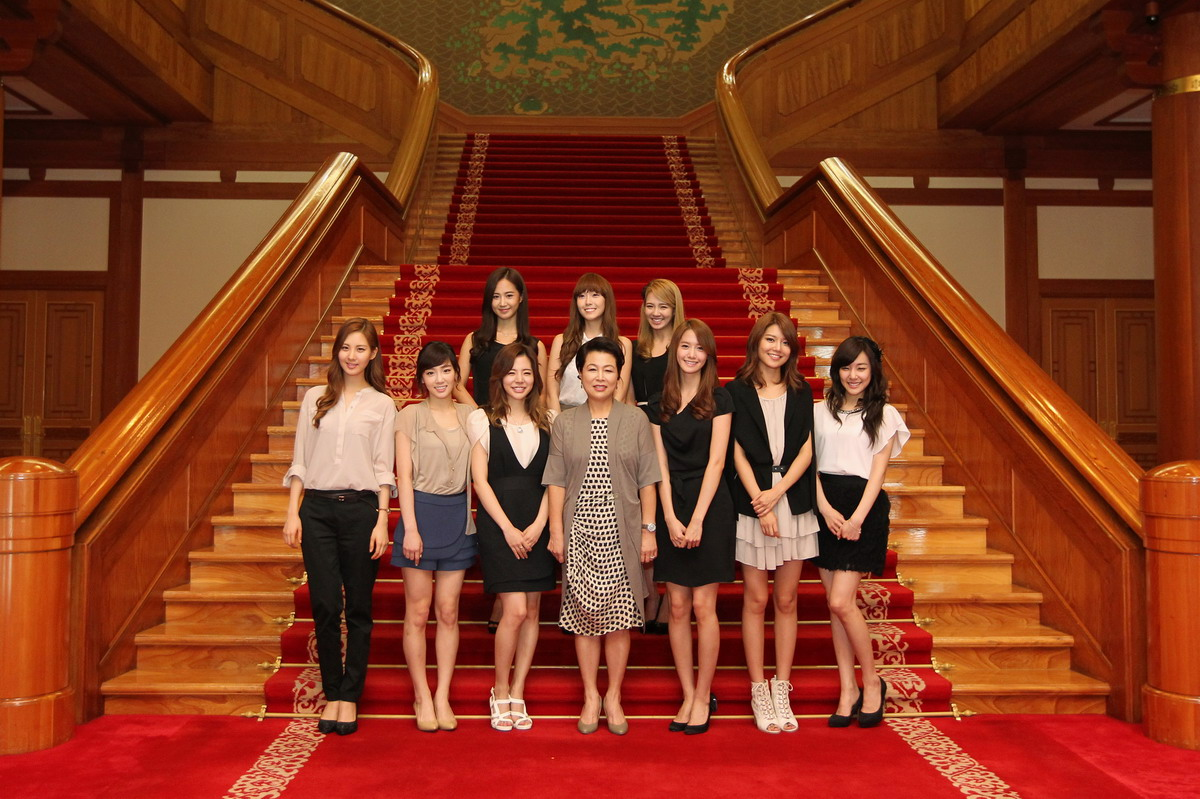
Girls' Generation with first lady Kim Yoon-ok at the Blue House in August 2011

A fixture on South Korean power rankings, the group placed within the top ten of Forbes Korea Power Celebrity 40 from 2010 to 2016, topping the list three times (2011, 2012, 2014). Girls' Generation consistently ranked in the top five of Gallup Korea's Singer of the Year poll from 2007 to 2016, topping the list three times (2009, 2010, 2011). The Sisa Journal named the group the most influential entertainers of 2011 and 2012, while Asia Today included the group in their list of 50 Korean Power Leaders in 2011. The group was named one of South Korea's "super brands" by the Korean Institute for Industrial Policy Studies in 2011, and one of the five South Korean musical acts that best represented K-pop during the past two decades by the Korea Creative Content Agency in 2015. (Note: The other four were BoA, TVXQ, Big Bang, and Psy.) In 2012, Girls' Generation became the first celebrities to have official postage stamps distributed by the Korea Post. In 2017, Billboard ranked Girls' Generation at number one on their "Top 10 K-pop Girl Groups of the Past Decade" list. In 2024, Girls' Generation tied with Blackpink for first place in a Gallup Korea survey as the most loved K-pop girl group debuted in the 21st century, marking its 17th anniversary. In 2025, the group was named among 40 most influential figures in the history of Korean pop music by the Golden Disc Awards.

The group's 2009 single "Gee" was declared "Song of the Decade" by Melon and is regarded as one of the first K-Pop songs to gain international attention, according to Google Statistics. Ian Martin of The Japan Times noted that the group's popularity was still strong even after the Korean Wave appeal had died down in Japan in 2011–12. During 2009–2011, the group generated ₩68.8 billion ($62 million), raking in $20 million in profits and becoming the highest profit earner for their label SM Entertainment. By 2012, Girls' Generation had sold over 30 million digital singles and 4.4 million physical albums, making them one of the best-selling artists in South Korea. Their songs have been widely recognized as the signature songs of K-pop: Pitchfork included "I Got a Boy" and "Gee" in their list of 20 essential K-pop songs, crediting them as the "magnum opus" of modern Korean music. Spin labelled "Run Devil Run" and "Gee" the 11th and 5th greatest K-pop songs of all time, respectively. Billboard placed "I Got a Boy" at number 21 on their list of the 100 Greatest Girl Group Songs, describing it as "proof to why girl-group music is in a league of its own in terms of excitement and boundary pushing". In 2023, Rolling Stone named "Gee" the greatest song in the history of Korean pop music.

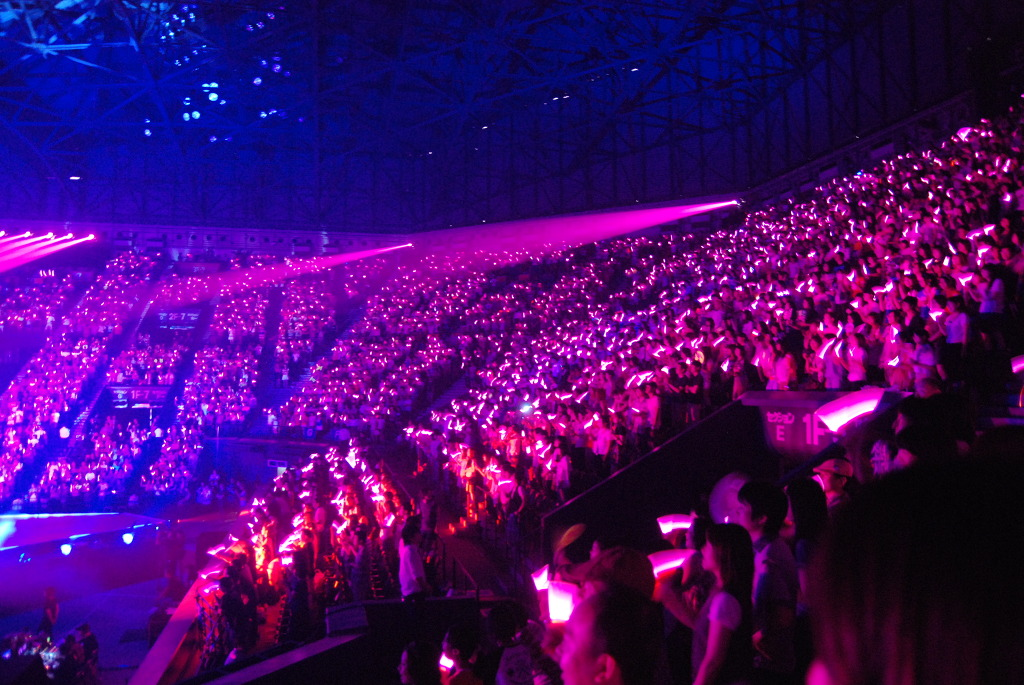
A Girls' Generation concert in 2010

Girls' Generation became the first girl group to achieve four music videos with over 100 million views on YouTube in 2015, with "Gee", "I Got a Boy", "The Boys", and "Mr. Taxi", and the first Asian girl group to amass five such videos with the addition of "Oh!" in 2016. Billboard Boxscore reported that Girls' Generation was the top touring K-pop girl group by 2016. The group won two Digital Daesangs (2009 and 2011) and one Disk Daesang (2010) at the Golden Disk Awards, making them the first girl group to win a Grand Prize three times in a row in the award's history and the first girl group to win an Album of the Year (Disk Daesang). They also won two Daesangs at the Seoul Music Awards, and were crowned both Artist of the Year and Best Female Group at the 2011 Mnet Asian Music Awards. Guinness World Records recognized Girls' Generation in its 2018 print edition as the artist that has earned the most awards at the Melon Music Awards (13 in total). In 2015, Girls' Generation became the first artist to accumulate 100 music show wins in Korea.

The group's lasting success has inspired or influenced various female K-pop singers such as Twice's Momo, Sana, and Mina, Mamamoo's Moonbyul, Itzy's Chaeryeong, Aespa's Karina, Le Sserafim's Sakura, Billlie's Tsuki, Choi Ye-na, and Fifty Fifty's Keena. Girl groups such as Apink, GFriend, Lovelyz, Oh My Girl, Red Velvet, Momoland, Iz*One, GWSN, STAYC, Melody Day, Dreamcatcher, Kep1er, Rocket Punch, and Mimiirose have declared them as their role models.

After reuniting for their 15th anniversary, Girls' Generation became one of the longest running K-pop girl groups. Writing for The Korea Herald, Choi Ji-won highlighted the significance of their return in "an industry where most girl groups cannot stand the test of time", especially considering that they are in different companies. Jeff Benjamin from Billboard further remarked that Girls' Generation is the latest example in a trend of groups staying together even if they depart the label that created them. Reporters from the Kyunghyang Shinmun commented on how in the K-pop industry where "young age is the capital", Girls' Generation and Kara's reunions in 2022 marked a milestone in the history of girl groups.

== Endorsements ==
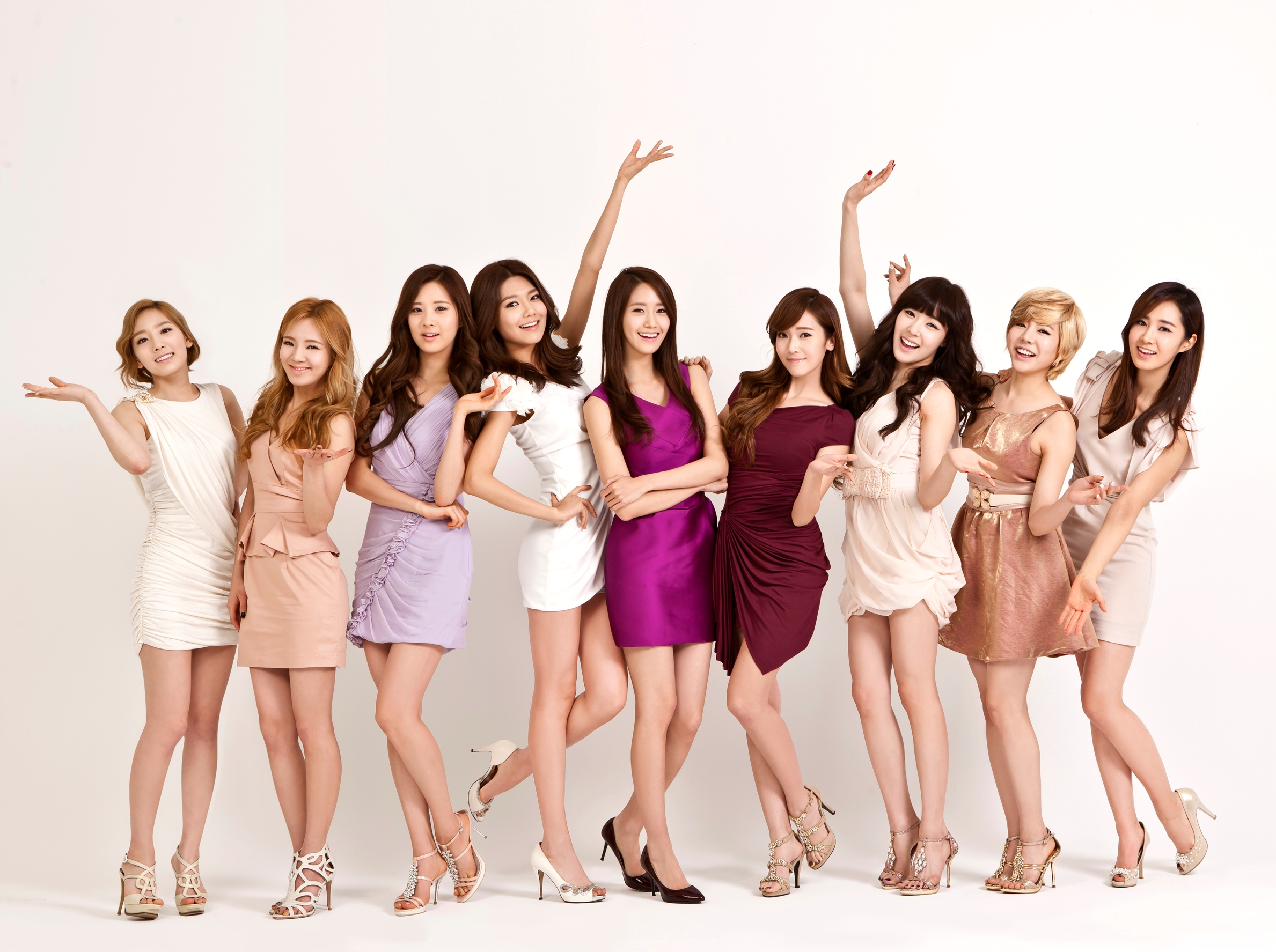
Girls' Generation for a LG Electronics commercial in 2012

Girls' Generation are regarded as one of the most sought-out advertisers in South Korea. Marketers named the group as the models with the most influence over consumers, attributing the group's positive attention from the public to their vocals, looks, and fashion sense. The group has appeared in over forty endorsement deals—major ones included LG, Intel, Korean chicken chain Goobne Chicken, Casio, Samantha Thavasa, Domino's Pizza and Lotte. They also collaborated with Korean shopping mall 10 Corso Como Seoul to create their own perfume brand "Girl".

In 2009, the popularity of "Gee" helped the group generate ₩1.5 billion ($1.2 million) in endorsement revenue. In 2011 and 2012, the members of Girls' Generation combined were the South Korean celebrities who shot the most commercials.

== Discography ==
Korean studio albums

- Girls' Generation (2007)
- Oh! (2010)
- The Boys (2011)
- I Got a Boy (2013)
- Lion Heart (2015)
- Holiday Night (2017)
- Forever 1 (2022)

Japanese studio albums

- Girls' Generation (2011)
- Girls & Peace (2012)
- Love & Peace (2013)

== Tours ==
=== Headlining ===
Asia tours

- Into the New World Tour (2009–2010)
- Girls' Generation Tour (2011–2012)
- Girls & Peace World Tour (2013–2014)
- Girls' Generation's Phantasia (2015–2016)

Japan tours

- The First Japan Arena Tour (2011)
- Girls & Peace Japan 2nd Tour (2013)
- Love & Peace Japan 3rd Tour (2014)

Special concerts

- Girls' Generation "The Best Live" at Tokyo Dome (2014)

Special events

- Girls' Generation "Holiday to Remember" 10th Anniversary (2017)
- 2022 Girls' Generation Special Event "Long Lasting Love" (2022)

=== Concert participation ===
- SM Town Live '08 (2008–2009)
- SM Town Live '10 World Tour (2010–2011)
- SM Town Live World Tour III (2012–2013)
- SM Town Week (2013)
- SM Town Live World Tour IV (2014–2015)
- SM Town Live World Tour V (2016)
- SM Town Live World Tour VI (2017)
- SM Town Live 2022: SMCU Express at Human City, Suwon (2022)

== Filmography ==
- I AM. (2012)
- SMTown: The Stage (2015)

== See also ==
- List of best-selling girl groups
