= Catch Me If You Can (song) =

Single by Girls' Generation
- B-side: "Girls"
- Released: April 10, 2015
- Recorded: 2014–15
- Genre: EDM
- Length: 3:45
- Label: SM; EMI Japan
- Composers: Jin Choi; Erik Lidbom
- Lyricists: Mafly, Choi A-reum (Korean); Junji Ishiwatari, Jeff Miyahara (Japanese)

Girls' Generation singles chronology
"Mr.Mr." (2014)	"Catch Me If You Can" (2015)	"Party" (2015)

Alternative cover
- Japanese 12-inch single cover

Music video
- "Catch Me If You Can" on YouTube

"Catch Me If You Can" is a song recorded in two languages (Japanese and Korean) by South Korean girl group Girls' Generation. The Korean version was released by SM Entertainment and KT Music on April 10, 2015, while the Japanese version was released on April 22 by EMI and Universal Music Japan. The song was composed by Erik Lidbom and Jin Choi, with the Korean lyrics written by Mafly and Choi A-reum, and the Japanese lyrics written by Junji Ishiwatari and Jeff Miyahara. Musically, it was described by critics as an EDM track. The song marked the first release of Girls' Generation as an eight-member group following the expulsion of member Jessica Jung in September 2014.

The single received generally favorable reviews from music critics, who not only praised its musical styles, but also compared the song to works by American musicians such as Zedd and Skrillex. Commercially, the single peaked at number 19 on the South Korean Gaon Digital Chart and number 8 on the Japanese Oricon Singles Chart. Two music videos were created for the single, one for the Korean version and one for the Japanese version, which were released simultaneously on April 10, 2015. The music videos were hailed for their "mind-blowing" choreography, as described by Billboard magazine.

== Background ==
South Korean girl group Girls' Generation had achieved success on the Asian music scene with hit singles such as "Gee" and "I Got a Boy" since their 2007 debut as a nine-piece girl group, consisting of members Taeyeon, Jessica, Sunny, Tiffany, Hyoyeon, Yuri, Sooyoung, Yoona and Seohyun. In September 2014, Jessica announced that she had been dismissed as a member of Girls' Generation by their parent company SM Entertainment, due to her schedule conflict between the group's mutual music activities and her own fashion business Blanc & Eclare; the release of "Catch Me If You Can" marked Girls' Generation's first release as an eight-member group.

On February 18, 2015, it was announced that Girls' Generation was preparing for their comeback in Japan by releasing their ninth Japanese single named "Catch Me If You Can", which was scheduled to be released in Japan on April 22, 2015. On March 23, further information regarding the single was announced: the Japanese version of "Catch Me If You Can" would be distributed under three formats: CD single, digital download, and 12-inch single. The Korean version was released digitally worldwide by SM Entertainment on April 10, 2015. Due to its popularity on YouTube, the song also received airplay on SiriusXM Hits 1 radio during the week of April 20, 2015. Both versions of the single contain a B-side track titled "Girls".

== Composition and reception ==
"Catch Me If You Can"
A sample of the Japanese version of "Catch Me If You Can", an EDM song

The music for "Catch Me If You Can" was composed by Erik Lidbom and Jin Choi. The Korean lyrics were written by Mafly and Choe A-Leum, while the Japanese lyrics were written by Junji Ishiwatari and Jeff Miyahara. Musically, the song was described as an electronic dance music (EDM) track. Jeff Benjamin, writing for Fuse, noted it as a departure from the group's signature bubblegum pop styles and named it "high-turbo" EDM. The song is instrumented by "surging" synthesizers, tribal house beats, and bass drops. Upon its release, "Catch Me If You Can" received generally positive reviews from music critics. Benjamin further compared the track's breakdowns to the musical styles of Russian–German DJ Zedd and wrote that the song "rise[s] above any mediocre label". He also wrote an article for Billboard where he compared its musical styles to those of Zedd and American DJ Skrillex, labelling it a "smart move".

=== Chart performance ===
The Korean version of "Catch Me If You Can" peaked at number 19 on the Gaon Digital Chart and has sold 135,068 digital downloads. It also peaked at number 2 on the US World Digital Songs chart by Billboard magazine, becoming the group's highest-charting single on the chart. The Japanese version debuted at number 8 on the Japanese Oricon Singles Chart, selling 20,835 physical copies in its first week of release. It becoming the 31st highest-selling CD single of April in Japan, selling 23,167 physical units. It has since sold 28,208 copies in Japan as of January 2017. It additionally charted at number 9 on the Japan Hot 100 by Billboard Japan. In Taiwan, the single charted atop the G-Music J-pop chart in the first week of May 2015.

== Music videos and promotion ==
On April 10, 2015, SM Entertainment released the Korean music video on YouTube and other online web-sharing websites, while the Japanese music video was disclosed on the group's Japanese official website. The audio was revealed simultaneously on several South Korean online distributors.

Prior to the release, the members of Girls' Generation had promoted the new song on their social network profiles, including Instagram and Sina Weibo. SM Entertainment also started a selfie contest with the hashtag "#catchGG" on Twitter, accompanying the group's comeback. Following the release of the song, the group did not do any official promotion in South Korea. However, Girls' Generation later performed the song on South Korean music program Show! Music Core, in conjunction with the release of the group's subsequent single "Party", in July 2015. They also performed the song on NTV's Live Monster concert in Japan during the same month.

The music video for "Catch Me If You Can" was directed by Toshiyuki Suzuki and features the members dancing in white tank tops and orange uniforms at a construction zone. Jeff Benjamin from American music magazine Billboard described the choreography as "powerful and sexy" and "mind-blowing". He further commented that the members sure "can dance their asses off" and compared the video to Ciara's 2009 music video for "Work" for the same construction zone background and the white tank top look. Similarly, Filipino channel Myx praised the music video's visual, commenting that the group were "keeping it hot with their steamy moves and outfits". In June 2015, an earlier version of the music video featuring ex-member Jessica unofficially released on the Internet. It was presumably filmed before she was dismissed from the group in September 2014.

== Track listings and formats ==
Digital download – Korean version
No.	Title	Lyrics	Music	Length
1.	"Catch Me If You Can"	Mafly, Choi A-reum (Jam Factory)	Erik Lidbom, Jin Choi	3:45
2.	"Girls"	Lee Seum-ran	Roel De Meulemeester, Guy Balbaert, Stefanie De Meulemeester	3:56
Total length:				7:41

CD Single / 12" Single / Digital download – Japanese version
No.	Title	Lyrics	Music	Length
1.	"Catch Me If You Can"	Junji Ishiwatari, Jeff Miyahara	Erik Lidbom, Jin Choi	3:45
2.	"Girls"	Miwa	Roel De Meulemeester, Guy Balbaert, Stefanie De Meulemeester	3:56
Total length:				7:41

CD Single Limited Press Special Package – Japanese version (bonus track)
No.	Title	Length
3.	"Catch Me If You Can" (without vocal track)	3:45
Total length:		11:26

DVD – Japanese version
No.	Title	Director	Length
1.	"Catch Me If You Can" (music video)	Toshiyuki Suzuki	4:21

== Chart ==
=== Korean version ===
Chart (2015)	Peak position
South Korean Gaon Singles Chart	19
US World Digital Songs Chart (Billboard)	2

=== Japanese version ===
Chart (2015)	Peak position
Japanese Billboard Japan Hot 100	9
Japanese Oricon Weekly Singles Chart	8
Taiwan J-pop (G-Music)	1

== Release history ==
Country	Release date	Format	Label	Ref.
Worldwide	April 10, 2015	Digital download	SM Entertainment; KT Music	
Japan	April 22, 2015	CD + DVD	EMI; Universal Music Japan	
Japan	April 22, 2015	Digital download	EMI; Universal Music Japan	
Taiwan	April 24, 2015	CD + DVD	Universal Music Taiwan	
Japan	June 5, 2015	12" single	EMI; Universal Music Japan	

== Credits ==
Credits adapted from single's liner notes.

=== Studio ===
- SM Blue Ocean Studio – recording, digital editing (all tracks)
- Bunkamura Studio – recording (track 1)
- Silent Sound Studio – mixing (track 2)
- Sterling Sound – mastering (all tracks)

=== Personnel ===
- SM Entertainment – executive producer
- Lee Soo-man – producer
- Girls' Generation – vocals, background vocals
- Choi A-reum – Korean lyrics (track 1)
- Mafly – Korean lyrics (track 1)
- Lee Seum-ran – Korean lyrics (track 2)
- Junji Ishiwatari – Japanese lyrics (track 1)
- Jeff Miyahara – Japanese lyrics (track 1), vocal directing (all tracks), recording (track 1)
- Miwa – Japanese lyrics (track 2)
- Jin Choi – composition, arrangement (track 1)
- Erik Lidbom – composition, arrangement (track 1)
- Roel De Meulemeester – composition, arrangement (track 2)
- Stefanie De Meulemeester – composition (track 2)
- Guy Balbaert – composition (track 2)
- Patrick Hamilton – arrangement (track 2)
- Keita Joko – chief engineer (all tracks)
- Kim Cheol-sun – recording, digital editing (all tracks)
- Jon Rezin – mixing (track 1)
- Miles Walker – mixing (track 2)
- Tom Coyne – mastering (all tracks)
