= Girls' Generation videography =

Girls' Generation video discography
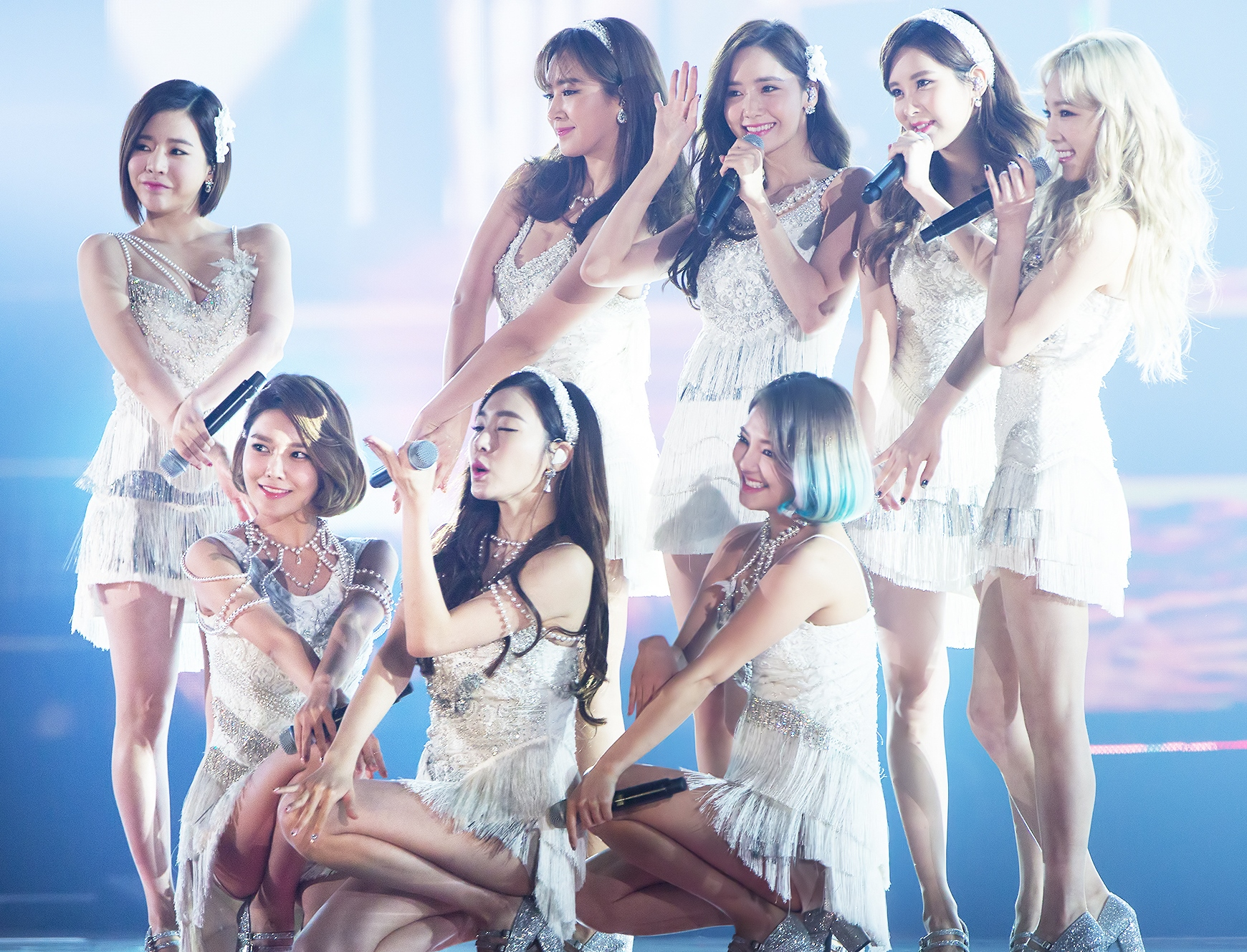
- Music videos: 49
- Dance videos: 13
- Commercial videos: 11

This is the videography of the South Korean girl group Girls' Generation. Girls' Generation has been active in the music industry since the group's debut in August 2007. The group is composed of eight members: Taeyeon, Sunny, Tiffany, Hyoyeon, Yuri, Sooyoung, Yoona and Seohyun. Former member Jessica was dismissed from the group in 2014.

== Music videos ==
Title	Year	Director	Length	Notes
"Into The New World" (다시 만난 세계)	2007	Cheon Hyeok-jin	4:52	Debut song
"Girls' Generation" (소녀시대)	2007	Unknown	3:55	Originally sung by Lee Seung-chul
"Kissing You"	2008	Lee Sang-kyu	3:20	
"Baby Baby"	2008	Unknown	3:23	
"Love Hate" (오빠 나빠)	2008	Unknown	3:48	Sung by Jessica, Tiffany and Seohyun
"Gee"	2009	Cho Soo-hyun	3:54	
"Gee" (Color version)	2009	Cho Soo-hyun	3:19	Dance Version
"Gee" (White version)	2009	Cho Soo-hyun	3:20	Dance Version
"Way To Go!" (힘 내!)	2009	Unknown	3:01	
"Tell Me Your Wish (Genie)" (소원을 말해봐)	2009	Jang Jae-hyeok	4:00	
"Oh!"	2010	Cho Soo-hyun	3:33	
"Run Devil Run"	2010	Cho Soo-hyun	3:27	
"Run Devil Run"	2010	Cho Soo-hyun	3:46	Story version
"Genie"	2010	Jang Jae-hyeok	4:25	Japanese version
"Genie"	2010	Jang Jae-hyeok	3:32	Japanese version; Dance Version
"Gee"	2010	Cho Soo-hyun	3:35	Japanese version
"Gee"	2010	Cho Soo-hyun	3:22	Japanese version; Dance Version
"Genie"	2010	Unknown	3:31	3D version
"Hoot" (훗)	2010	Jang Jae-hyeok	4:13	
"Hoot"	2010	Jang Jae-hyeok	3:18	Dance Version
"Beautiful Girls"	2011	Unknown	3:57	Sung by Yoo Young-jin
"Run Devil Run"	2011	Hideaki Sunaga	3:36	Japanese version
"Run Devil Run"	2011	Hideaki Sunaga	3:25	Japanese version; Dance Version
"Mr. Taxi"	2011	Hideaki Sunaga	3:46	
"Mr. Taxi"	2011	Hideaki Sunaga	3:37	Japanese version; Dance Version
"Echo"	2011	Unknown	3:31	
"Run Devil Run"	2011	Unknown	3:58	3D version
"Bad Girl"	2011	Hideaki Sunaga	4:05	
"The Boys"	2011	Hong Won-ki	5:19	Korean version
"The Boys"	2011	Hong Won-ki	5:20	English version
"Time Machine"	2012	Masaaki Uchino	5:38	
"Paparazzi"	2012	Toshiyuki Suzuki	6:36	
"Paparazzi"	2012	Toshiyuki Suzuki	4:10	Close-up version
"Paparazzi"	2012	Toshiyuki Suzuki	3:53	Full version; Dance Version
"Paparazzi"	2012	Toshiyuki Suzuki	3:56	Gold edition; Dance Version
"All My Love is For You"	2012	Masaaki Uchino	4:06	
"Oh!"	2012	Hideaki Sunaga	4:10	Japanese version
"Oh!"	2012	Hideaki Sunaga	3:11	Japanese version; Dance Version
"Flower Power"	2012	Toshiyuki Suzuki	3:42	
"Flower Power"	2012	Toshiyuki Suzuki	3:23	Dance Version
"Dancing Queen"	2012	Unknown	4:23	Originally recorded in 2008, but released on December 21, 2012
"I Got A Boy"	2013	Hong Won-ki	5:05	
"Love & Girls"	2013	Toshiyuki Suzuki	3:37	
"Love & Girls"	2013	Toshiyuki Suzuki	3:17	Dance Version
"Galaxy Supernova"	2013	Toshiyuki Suzuki	3:42	
"Galaxy Supernova"	2013	Toshiyuki Suzuki	3:30	Dance Version
"My oh My"	2013	Hong Won-ki	3:27	
"Beep Beep"	2013	Toshiyuki Suzuki	3:39	Short version, originally previewed in April; full version was released eight months later in December
"Mr.Mr."	2014	Kim Beom-chul	4:04	
"Mr. Taxi"	2014	Unknown	3:35	Split screen version
"Indestructible"	2014	Unknown	4:35	Lyrics Video
"Divine"	2014	Unknown	5:44	Story version. First music video where the nine members do not appear
"Divine"	2014	Masaaki Uchino	4:18	Last music video with nine members before Jessica's departure
"Catch Me If You Can"	2015	Toshiyuki Suzuki	4:22	Korean version
"Catch Me If You Can"	2015	Toshiyuki Suzuki	4:21	Japanese version
"Party"	2015	Hong Won-ki	3:38	
"Lion Heart"	2015	Hong Won-ki	5:37	
"You Think"	2015	Lee Ki-baek	3:18	
"Sailing (0805)"	2016	Unknown	4:21	Digital single, to commemorate nine years together since debut
"Holiday"	2017	Ziyong Kim (Fantazy Lab)	3:24	
"All Night"	2017	Shin Hee-won	7:48	Documentary version
"All Night"	2017	Shin Hee-won	3:52	Clean version
"Forever 1"	2022	Shin Hee-won	3:33	
"Forever 1 (Matisse & Sadko Remix)"	2022	Unknown	3:43	

== Commercial videos ==
Title	Year	Length	Notes
"It's Fantastic"	2008	3:31	Sung by Jessica, Tiffany, and Seohyun; title song for the online game Mabinogi
"Haptic Motion"	2008	7:48	Commercial film with TVXQ for Samsung Anycall's Haptic
"HaHaHa Song"	2009	1:20	Public campaign
"Chocolate Love"	2009	4:00	Commercial film for the LG CYON Chocolate
"Seoul"	2009	4:14	Publicity MV for Seoul, with Super Junior
"Cabi Song"	2010	4:28	Commercial film for Caribbean Bay, with 2PM
"Show! Show! Show!"	2010	1:05	Commercial film for the SPAO Fashion Wear, with Super Junior
"Lal Lal La"	2010	2:59	Voting campaign
"Hey, Cooky!"	2010	1:37	Advertisement for the LG Cooky
"Genie"	2010	3:31	Was released for Samsung PAVV LED TV in 3D
"첫눈에... (Snowy Wish)"	2010	3:37	Presented by Daum
"Visual Dreams (Pop! Pop!)"	2011	3:30	Campaign for Intel Asia

== Filmography ==
=== Film ===
Title	Year	Role	Other notes
I AM.	2012	Themselves	Biographical film
SMTown: The Stage	2015	Themselves	Biographical film

=== Television ===
==== Drama ====
Title	Year	Role	Note	Ref
Kimcheed Radish Cubes	2007	Themselves	Cameo in Episode 9	
Sazae-san 3	2011	Themselves	Cameo	
ENT	2012	Themselves	Cartoon Characters	
The Producers	2015	Themselves	Cameo in Episode 1, only TTS	

==== Reality series ====
Title	Year	Note	Ref.
Girls' Generation Goes to School	2007	Narrated by Sungmin from Super Junior; Pre-debut TV series	
MTV Girls' Generation	2007	Each episode featured a separate member	
Factory Girl	2008	Not all members were present in every episode due to conflicting schedules	
Girls' Generation's Horror Movie Factory	2009	Yoona was not present due to her commitments filming Cinderella Man	
Himnaera Him!/Cheer Up!	2009	Replaced Horror Movie Factory due to low ratings	
Girls' Generation's Hello Baby	2009	Part of KBS's Hello Baby series	
Right Now It's Girls' Generation	2010	Archival footage from 2007 to 2010	
Girls' Generation Star Life Theater	2011	Follows the group during the release of The Boys	
Girls' Generation and the Dangerous Boys	2011	Leading weekend program on JTBC	
Channel Girls' Generation	2015	First reality show after Jessica's departure	
Girl's for Rest	2018	Girls' Generation-Oh!GG's show	
Soshi TamTam	2022	New full-group reality show in seven years, to celebrate the group's 15th anniversary and ahead of their 2022 comeback	

==== Specials ====
Title	Year	Note
Girls' Generation’s Christmas Fairy Tale	2011	Christmas special
Girls' Generation's Romantic Fantasy	2013	MBC Girls' Generation New Year's Day Comeback special

== See also ==
- Girls' Generation discography
- List of songs by Girls' Generation
- List of awards and nominations received by Girls' Generation
- List of Girls' Generation concert tours
