= List of Girls' Generation live performances =

Girls' Generation live performances
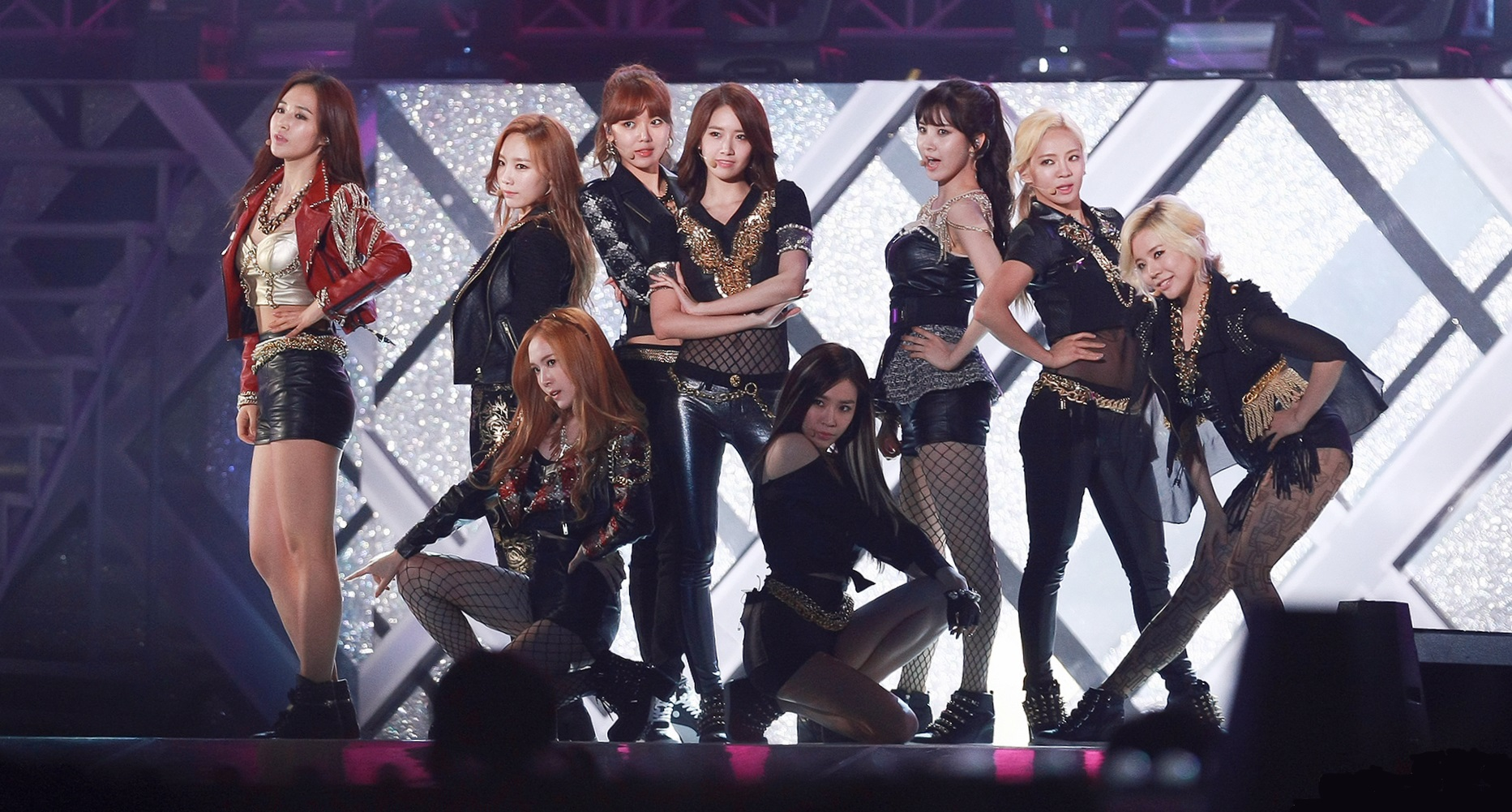
- Girls' Generation performing at the 2013 Dream Concert in Seoul
- Concert tours: 7
- Special lives: 7
- Comeback showcases: 2
- Fanmeetings: 8
- Award shows: 38
- Festivals: 59
- Benefit concerts: 6
- Sporting events: 8
- Special broadcasts: 20
- Television shows: 129
- Other lives: 10

South Korean girl group Girls' Generation have performed over 150 concerts across Asia. They embarked on their first tour, Into the New World Tour in December 2009. Their next tour, The First Japan Tour, was attended by 140,000 people.

The group subsequently followed up the success of their Japan tour by embarking on their eponymously titled third tour, the 2011 Girls' Generation Tour. The group then toured Japan for the second time in early 2013, with a total of 20 stops on their Girls & Peace Japan 2nd Tour, which was attended by 200,000 people.

In addition to their own headlining tours, the group has participated in multiple SMTown tours. Their first appearance was at SM Town Live '08, and their following participation in SM Town Live '10 World Tour saw the group (along with fellow SMTown acts) become the first Asian singers in history to reach the top 10 on the US Billboard Concert Boxcore chart. The group also performed on SM Town Live World Tour III (2012–2013), SM Town Week (2013), SM Town Live World Tour IV (2014–2015), SM Town Live World Tour V (2016), SM Town Live World Tour VI (2017) and SM Town Live 2022: SMCU Express (2022).

== Concert tours ==
=== Headlining ===
Year	Title	Associated album(s)	Duration	Attendance	Shows
2009–2010	Into the New World Tour	Girls' Generation (2007), Gee, Genie and Oh!	December 19, 2009 – October 17, 2010 (Asia)	—	7
"The Into the New World Tour" was Girls' Generation's first headlining tour. The tour was announced in November 2009, and tickets were sold-out within 3 minutes of being put on sale.
2011	The First Japan Arena Tour	Girls' Generation (2011)	May 31, 2011 – July 18, 2011 (Japan)	140,000	14
The group embarked on their first nationwide Japanese tour starting originally on May 18, 2011, with a total of seven initial stops. The tour was postponed because of the 2011 Tōhoku earthquake and tsunami, and then commenced on May 31, 2011. Due to overwhelming demand, seven more stops were added for a total audience of 140,000. The tour covered Osaka, Saitama, Tokyo, Hiroshima, Nagoya, and Fukuoka with total of fourteen performances.
2011–2012	Girls' Generation Tour	Hoot and Girls' Generation (2011)	July 23, 2011 – February 12, 2012 (Asia)	92,000	9
The eponymously titled "2011 Girls' Generation Tour" was the group's 2nd world tour. The tour commenced with two performances in Seoul, to Taiwan where they played three back-to-back record breaking performances, and subsequently Singapore for two days. The Bangkok date on February 12, 2012, saw the group break a Thai record for the fastest selling concert in history. The tour also saw the group perform in Hong Kong for the first time. The tour attracted 92,000 people in total.
2013	Girls & Peace Japan 2nd Tour	Girls & Peace	February 9, 2013 – April 21, 2013 (Japan)	200,000	20
The group's second Japanese tour was announced on August 31, 2012, with ticket applicability starting September 12, 2012. The tour covered 20 stops. They performed to 200,000 people across seven Japanese cities.
2013–2014	Girls & Peace World Tour	Girls & Peace and I Got A Boy	June 8, 2013 – February 15, 2014 (Asia)	—	10
The tour was announced on April 26, 2013, with two dates in Seoul at the Olympic Arena. The tour is the 3rd World Tour by Girls' Generation, consisting of various Asian cities.
2014	Love & Peace Japan 3rd Tour	Love & Peace	April 26, 2014 – July 13, 2014 (Japan)	200,000	18
Girls' Generation's 3rd Japanese tour was announced on November 29, 2013. The tour covered 18 stops and drew a total of around 200,000 people. Through their three Japanese concert tours since 2011, Girls' Generation attracted a combined total of 550,000 people, setting a record among Korean girl groups.
2015–2016	Girls' Generation's Phantasia	Lion Heart	November 21, 2015 – May 8, 2016 (Asia)	135,000	13
Girls' Generation's 4th world tour was announced on October 16, 2015. On August 11, 2015, a separate tour in Japan was announced to take place in December 2015. On November 17, 2015, it was announced on Girls' Generation's official Japanese fanclub website that the separate Japan tour announced in August 2015 would be title "Girls' Generation 4th Tour -Phantasia- in Japan" and the tour dates already announced would be a part of their 4th tour.

=== Promotional ===
Title	Dates	Associated album(s)	Venue
Girls' Generation's Romantic Fantasy	December 23, 2012	I Got a Boy	MBC Dream Center
Romantic Fantasy was a televised mini-concert and comeback special by Girls' Generation to promote their fourth Korean studio album. It occurred in MBC broadcast center on December 23, 2012. Aired later on MBC on January 1, 2013. I Got a Boy. According to AGB Nielsen Media Research, the comeback special garnered a nationwide viewership rating of 3.8%. The highest among Korean broastcasting system artists' special comeback at the time. The special featured live performances of the album's title track along with other group hits and solo stages by each member. Styled with a whimsical, fairy tale concept, it served as both a promotional showcase and a reimagining of their earlier Märchen Fantasy concert, marking their official return to the Korean music scene after a year-long hiatus.

=== As a supporting act ===
Title	Dates	Headlining artist(s)	Venue
Lee Seung-chul's Christmas Concert	December 23, 2007	Lee Seung-chul	Seoul Olympic Stadium
In December 2007, veteran singer Lee Seung-chul announced that he would make a collaboration with rookie idol group Girls' Generation for his Christmas concert, performing a remake of his 1989 hit "Girls' Generation". The event marked the group's first major collaboration and symbolized a connection between K-pop generations. Lee praised their faithful reinterpretation of the song, while offering advice on longevity and live performance in the music industry.

== Special lives ==
Title	Dates	Venue	City	Attendance
Japan Premium Showcase Live	August 25, 2010 (3 shows)	Ariake Coliseum	Tokyo	22,000
Japan Premium Showcase Live (also known as the Tokyo Premium Showcase) was a showcase event by the group, held on August 25, 2010 at the Ariake Coliseum in Tokyo, Japan, as part of the group’s official debut activities in the Japanese market. The event marked Girls’ Generation’s first performance in Japan and served to launch their Japanese promotions, including the release of their Japanese debut single Genie. The showcase was staged three times due to overwhelming fan demand. The initial performance attracted approximately 7,000 attendees, with total attendance across all shows reaching around 22,000, highlighting the group’s burgeoning popularity in Japan.
Playing with Girls' Generation	November 13, 2012	Yoyogi National Gymnasium	Tokyo	10,000
“Playing with Girls’ Generation” was a fan-centric event orchestrated by the group on November 13, 2012, at the Yoyogi National Gymnasium in Tokyo, Japan. The event was organized to celebrate the group’s Japanese music releases and provide fans with direct interactions, including games, live performances, and talk segments. Staged as a one-day event, it drew around 10,000 attendees, showcasing the group’s popularity in Japan.
Free Live "Love & Peace"	December 14, 2013 (2 shows)	Yokohama Arena	Yokohama	30,000
"Free Live 'Love & Peace'" was a complimentary concert by the group that occurred on December 14, 2013, at Yokohama Arena in Japan. The concert was presented in two shows and was free for attendees who entered a ticket lottery tied to album purchases, coinciding with promotions for their third Japanese studio album Love & Peace. The event drew a total of approximately 30,000 fans over two days.
"The Best Live" at Tokyo Dome	December 9, 2014	Tokyo Dome	Tokyo	50,000
“'The Best Live' at Tokyo Dome" was a landmark concert by the group held on December 9, 2014, at Tokyo Dome in Japan. The event marked the group as the first K-pop girl group to sell over 50,000 tickets at the venue and the second K-pop girl group to perform there. The concert featured a full set of the group’s Japanese and Korean hits, special stage segments, costume changes, and fan interactions, and was organized to commemorate their fourth anniversary of debut in Japan. This was also their first major concert without Jessica.
S♡NE Limited Party	April 26, 2015	Saitama Super Arena	Saitama	10,000
"S♡NE Limited Party" was a fan meeting event hosted by the group on April 26, 2015, in Japan, exclusively for members of their official fan club, S♡NE JAPAN. The event encompassed live performances, interactive games, and moderated talk segments, and was structured in two distinct sessions to facilitate a more intimate and immersive experience for attendees. Limited-edition merchandise was distributed.

== Comeback showcases ==
Release	Date	Venue	City	Country	Attendance	Ref.
Party	July 7, 2015	Banyan Tree Hotel	Seoul	South Korea	200	
Forever 1	August 5, 2022	InterContinental Seoul COEX	Seoul	South Korea	—	

== Fanmeetings ==
Title	Date	City	Country	Venue	Attendance
Girls' Generation Official Fanclub S♡NE 1st Fanmeeting	September 26, 2010	Seoul	South Korea	Korea University Hwajeong Gymnasium	2,400
The fanmeeting convened 2,400 attendees, representing the inaugural assembly of the group’s official fan club. The event encompassed live performances, interactive segments, and fan engagement activities.
Girls' Generation Debut 5th Anniversary Party	July 28, 2012	Seoul	South Korea	Pfeiffer Hall, Ewha Womans University	—
Girls' Generation 1st Fan Party Mr.Mr.	September 30, 2014	Shenzhen	China	Bao'an Gymnasium	5,000
Girls' Generation 1st Fan Party Mr.Mr.	The fan party in Shenzhen accommodated 5,000 spectators. The event, part of the group’s first China fan meeting tour promoting their Mr.Mr. album, featured performances of hit songs and interactive segments with fans. It marked the first stop of a multi-city tour across China, performed by the group’s eight-member lineup following Jessica’s departure, which reportedly caused confusion and heightened anticipation among fans, making the event particularly tense and emotionally charged.				
Girls' Generation 1st Fan Party Mr.Mr.	November 21, 2014	Nanjing	China	Nanjing Olympic Sports Center Gymnasium	—
Girls' Generation 1st Fan Party Mr.Mr.	November 22, 2014	Chongqing	China	Chongqing International Expo Center	—
Girls' Generation 1st Fan Party Mr.Mr.	November 29, 2014	Beijing	China	MasterCard Center	—
Girls' Generation 1st Fan Party Mr.Mr.	January 3, 2015	Shanghai	China	Mercedes-Benz Arena	—
Girls' Generation 1st Fan Party Mr.Mr.	January 4, 2015	Guangzhou	China	Guangzhou International Sports Arena	—
"Holiday to Remember" 10th Anniversary	August 5, 2017	Seoul	South Korea	Olympic Hall	2,500
The group’s 10th Anniversary fan meeting, “Holiday to Remember,” was held on August 5, 2017, at Olympic Hall in Seoul to commemorate their decade-long milestone. The event featured performances from Holiday Night and past hits, interactive talk segments, offering fans an intimate experience with the group.
LLL (Long Lasting Love)	September 3, 2022	Seoul	South Korea	KSPO Dome	8,000
"LLL (Long Lasting Love)" was a 2022 fan meeting held by Girls’ Generation to celebrate their 15th anniversary and their first full-member fan event since their 2017 hiatus. Taking place at the Olympic Gymnastics Arena in Seoul, making the group the first K-pop girl group to host a fan meeting at the venue.Ticket demand exceeded expectations, with roughly 100,000 users accessing the ticketing platform, leading to a sellout and the release of restricted-view seats. The event included performances, talk segments, games, and fan interactions.

== Award shows ==
List of awards show performances, showing event names, dates, locations, and performed songs
Title	Date	Venue	City	Country	Performed song(s)	Ref.
2007 Mnet 20's Choice Awards	August 21, 2007	Hangang Park	Seoul	South Korea	"Into the New World"	
14th Cyworld Digital Music Awards	September 12, 2007	CGV Apgujeong	Seoul	South Korea	"Into the New World"	
14th Korea Entertainment and Arts Awards	October 5, 2007	Gunpo Civic Sports Complex	Gunpo	South Korea	"Into the New World"	
14th Korea Entertainment and Arts Awards	October 6, 2007	Gunpo Civic Sports Complex	Gunpo	South Korea	"Into the New World"	
1st Korea Drama Awards	October 19, 2007	Culture Centure, The Gyeongju World Culture Expo	Gyeongju	South Korea	"Into the New World"	
2007 Mnet KM Music Festival	November 17, 2007	Jamsil Arena	Seoul	South Korea	"Into the New World" (Battle of Princess) and "Girls' Generation" (Fantasia)	
22nd Golden Disc Awards	December 14, 2007	Olympic Hall	Seoul	South Korea	"Honey (Perfect For You)", "Ooh La-La!" and "Girls' Generation"	
1st SBS Entertainment Awards	December 28, 2007	SBS Open Hall	Seoul	South Korea	"Girls' Generation"	
17th Seoul Music Awards	January 31, 2008	Kangwon Land High1 Grand Hotel	Jeongseon	South Korea	"Love Love Love" (Note: Taeyeon with Epik High) "Baby Baby", "Kissing You" and "Girls' Generation"	
20th Cyworld Digital Music Awards	March 17, 2008	COEX	Seoul	South Korea	"Girls' Generation", "Kissing You" and "If" (Note: Taeyeon solo)	
44th Baeksang Arts Awards	April 24, 2008	National Theater of Korea	Seoul	South Korea	"Girls' Generation"	
2008 Mnet 20's Choice Awards	August 23, 2008	Jangchung Arena	Seoul	South Korea	"Fall In Love" (Kim Gun-mo cover) (Note: Sung with Kim Gun-mo, Seohyun and YoonA were absent)	
31st Cyworld Digital Music Awards	February 22, 2009	Seoul Art Fashion Hall	Seoul	South Korea	"Gee"	
45th Baeksang Arts Awards	February 27, 2009	Olympic Hall	Seoul	South Korea	"Gee"	
10th Jeonju International Film Festival	April 29, 2009	Nosong Square, Jeonju City Hall	Seoul	South Korea	"Gee" and "Way To Go"	
17th Korea Culture Entertainment Awards	December 30, 2009	Olympic Hall	Seoul	South Korea	"Gee" (Note: Taeyeon was absent)	
24th Golden Disc Awards	December 10, 2009	Olympic Hall	Seoul	South Korea	"Smooth Criminal" (Michael Jackson dance cover) (Note: Sunny, Hyoyeon, Yuri, Sooyoung, Seohyun performed), "Chocolate Love" and "Gee"	
2009 Melon Music Awards	December 16, 2009	Olympic Hall	Seoul	South Korea	"Chocolate Love", "Genie" and "Gee"	
19th Seoul Music Awards	February 3, 2010	SK Olympic Handball Gymnasium	Seoul	South Korea	"Gee" and "Oh!"	
46th Baeksang Arts Awards	March 26, 2010	National Theater of Korea	Seoul	South Korea	"Run Devil Run"	
2010 Mister World	March 27, 2010	Songdo Convensia	Incheon	South Korea	"Oh!" and "Gee"	
47th Grand Bell Awards	October 29, 2010	Hall of Peace, Kyung Hee University	Seoul	South Korea	"Oh!" and "Hoot"	
8th Korean Film Awards	November 18, 2010	Sejong Center	Seoul	South Korea	"Hoot" and "Genie" (Note: Tiffany was absent)	
25th Golden Disc Awards	December 9, 2010	Korea University	Seoul	South Korea	"Oh!" and "Run Devil Run" (Note: Tiffany was absent)	
2010 Melon Music Awards	December 15, 2010	Hall of Peace, Kyung Hee University	Seoul	South Korea	Intro, "Hoot" and "Oh!"	
52nd Japan Record Awards	December 30, 2010	New National Theatre Tokyo	Tokyo	Japan	"Gee"	
20th Seoul Music Awards	January 20, 2011	Hall of Peace, Kyung Hee University	Seoul	South Korea	"Run Devil Run" and "Hoot"	
2nd Seoul Culture and Arts Awards	February 28, 2011	Olympic Gymnastics Arena	Seoul	South Korea	"Hoot"	
2011 MTV Video Music Aid Japan	June 25, 2011	Makuhari Messe	Chiba	Japan	"The Greatest Escape" and "Mr. Taxi"	
48th Grand Bell Awards	October 17, 2011	Sejong Center	Seoul	South Korea	"Hoot"	
2011 Style Icon Awards	November 3, 2011	CJ E&M Center	Seoul	South Korea	"The Boys"	
3rd Korean Popular Culture and Arts Awards	November 21, 2011	Olympic Hall	Seoul	South Korea	"The Boys" (Note: YoonA was absent)	
2011 Mnet Asian Music Awards	November 29, 2011	Singapore Indoor Stadium	Singapore		Intro, "The Boys" and "The Boys" (MAMA remix)	
10th KBS Entertainment Awards	December 24, 2011	KBS Hall	Seoul	South Korea	"The Boys"	
26th Golden Disc Awards	January 12, 2012	Kyocera Dome	Osaka	Japan	"The Boys"	
23rd Seoul Music Awards	January 22, 2014	Olympic Gymnastics Arena	Seoul	South Korea	"I Got a Boy"	
3rd Gaon Chart Music Awards	February 12, 2014	Olympic Gymnastics Arena	Seoul	South Korea	"I Got a Boy"	
2016 WebTVAsia Awards	November 26, 2016	KINTEX	Goyang	South Korea	"Lion Heart", "Party", "Hoot" and "Gee"	

== Festivals ==
List of festival performances, showing dates, locations, and performed songs where available
Event	Date	Venue	City	Country	Performed song(s)	Ref.
2007 Siheung Gaetgol Festival	August 18, 2007	Siheung Gaetgol Ecological Park	Gyeonggi	South Korea	"Into The New World"	
2007 Namyangju Trass Festival - TLAS	September 1, 2007	Bukhangang Cultural Outing	Namyangju	South Korea	"Into The New World"	
2007 YTN Star Special - JUMP Guro	September 13, 2007	Special stage,Guro Digital Complex station	Seoul	South Korea	"Into The New World"	
Bravo Ansan Happy Concert	September 29, 2007	Ansan Wa~ Stadium	Ansan	South Korea	"Into The New World"	
9th Korea-China Song Festival	December 6, 2007	National Centre for the Performing Arts	Beijing	China	"Girls' Generation"	
6th Korea Times Music Festival	May 17, 2008	Hollywood Bowl	Los Angeles	United States	"Kissing You" and "Girls' Generation" (Note: YoonA was absent)	
2008 Dream Concert	June 7, 2008	Seoul Olympic Stadium	Seoul	South Korea	"Girls' Generation" and "Into the New World" (Remix)	
2008 Asia Song Festival	October 4, 2008	Sangnam Stadium	Seoul	South Korea	"Kissing You", "Into the New World", "Girls' Generation", "Ooh La-La!" and "Baby Baby"	
2009 Pattaya International Music Festival	March 21, 2009	Pattaya Beach (Main stage)	Pattaya	Thailand	"Kissing You", "Into the New World" and "Gee" (Note: YoonA did not participate)	
7th Korea Times Music Festival	May 9, 2009	Hollywood Bowl	Los Angeles	United States	"A Goose's Dream" (Insooni cover) (Note: Taeyeon with Lee Juk), "You Raise Me Up" (Secret Garden cover) (Note: Jessica with Lena Park), "Gee" and "Way To Go!" (Note: YoonA was absent)	
1st Incheon Korean Music Wave	September 5, 2009	Incheon Munhak Stadium	Incheon	South Korea	"Gee", "Genie" and "Etude"	
2009 Asia Song Festival	September 19, 2009	Sangnam Stadium	Seoul	South Korea	"Genie" and "Gee"	
2009 Dream Concert	October 10, 2009	Sangnam Stadium	Seoul	South Korea	"Genie" and "Gee"	
2009 Vietnam Korea Friendship Festival	October 18, 2009	Vietnam National Convention Center	Ha Noi	Vietnam	"Genie" and "Gee" (Note: Yuri was absent)	
2009 Brighten Light Concert	November 14, 2009	Tiger Dome	Seoul	South Korea	"Genie", "Chocolate Love" and "Gee"	
The Blast Super Concert	February 20, 2010	Olympic Gymnastics Arena	Seoul	South Korea	"Show! Show! Show!", "Girls' Generation", "Genie", "Oh!" and "Gee"	
Gwangju Expo Light Festival, Light & Big Concert	April 9, 2010	Gwangju City Hall	Gwangju	South Korea	"Genie", "Show! Show! Show!" and "Run Devil Run"	
2010 Dream Concert	May 22, 2010	Sangnam Stadium	Seoul	South Korea	"Run Devil Run" and "Oh!"	
2nd Incheon Korean Music Wave	August 29, 2010	Incheon Munhak Stadium	Incheon	South Korea	"Oh!" and "Run Devil Run"	
KIKO Citizen Awareness Festival	October 13, 2010	Culture Plaza, Yeouido Park	Seoul	South Korea	"Run Devil Run", "Oh!" and "Gee"	
2010 K-pop Night Concert	October 23, 2010	Singaporean EXPO	Singapore	Singapore	"Genie", "Oh!", "Run Devil Run" and "Gee"	
12th Korea-China Song Festival	December 2, 2010	KBS Hall	Seoul	South Korea	"Hoot" (Note: Tiffany was absent)	
Korean Music Wave in Bangkok	March 12, 2011	Rajamangala Stadium	Bangkok	Thailand	"Hoot", "Oh!" and "Gee"	
2011 Music Bank World Tour	July 13, 2011	Tokyo Dome	Tokyo	Japan	"Hoot" and "Run Devil Run"	
3rd Incheon Korean Music Wave	August 13, 2011	Incheon Munhak Stadium	Incheon	South Korea	"Hoot" and "Run Devil Run"	
2011 Summer Sonic	August 14, 2011	Makuhari Messe (Mountain stage)	Chiba	Japan	"Genie", "Mr. Taxi", "Run Devil Run", "Let It Rain", "Bad Girl" and "The Great Escape"	
K-pop All Star Live in Niigata	August 20, 2011	Tohoku Denryoku Big Swan Stadium	Niigata	Japan	"Run Devil Run", "Hoot", "Oh!", "Gee"	
2011 Hallyu Dream Concert	October 3, 2011	Gyeongju Civic Stadium	Gyeongju	South Korea	"Genie" and "Hoot"	
2011 Asia Song Festival	October 15, 2011	Daegu Stadium	Daegu	South Korea	"Run Devil Run", "Hoot" and "Gee"	
13th Korea-China Song Festival	November 8, 2011	CCTV Headquarters	Beijing	China	"Hoot" and "The Boys"	
2011 K-pop Music Festival	November 12, 2011	ANZ Stadium	Sydney	Australia	"The Boys" and "Kissing You"	
2011 Brighten Light Concert	November 22, 2011	Tiger Dome	Seoul	South Korea	"Genie", "The Boys" and "How Great Is Your Love" (Note: YoonA was absent)	
2012 Music Bank World Tour	February 8, 2012	Accor Arena	Paris	France	"Genie", "Hoot", "Gee", "Mr.Taxi" and "The Boys"	
2012 Twin Towers @Live Concert	March 23, 2012	Petronas Towers	Kuala Lumpur	Malaysia	"The Boys", "Genie", "Hoot", "Run Devil Run", "Mr. Taxi" and "Gee" (Note: Yuri was absent)	
Korean Music Wave in Google	May 21, 2012	Shoreline Amphitheatre	Mountain View, California	United States	"Flying Duck" (Cherry Filter cover) (Note: Seohyun solo), "The Boys", "Mr. Taxi" and "Gee"	
2012 K-pop Nation Concert in Macau	July 2, 2012	Venetian Arena	Macau	China	"Genie", "Run Devil Run", "The Boys", "Hoot" and "Gee"	
14th Korea-China Song Festival	August 25, 2012	Yeosu EXPO Convention Center	Yeosu	South Korea	"Mr. Taxi" and "The Boys"	
2012 Gangnam Festival	October 7, 2012	COEX	Seoul	South Korea	"Genie", "Mr. Taxi", "Hoot", "The Boys", "Kissing You", "Oh!" and "Gee"	
SBS Super K-Pop Concert in America	November 10, 2012	Irvine Meadows Amphitheatre	Irvine	United States	"Genie", "Mr. Taxi", "Run Devil Run" and "The Boys"	
Show! Music Core: K-pop Festival 2012 - Concert in Vietnam	November 29, 2012	My Dinh Stadium	Ha Noi	Vietnam	"Mr. Taxi", "The Boys" and "Genie"	
Dream K-Pop Fantasy Concert	January 19, 2013	SM Mall of Asia Arena	Manila	Philippines	"Genie", "The Boys", "Hoot", "Dancing Queen", "Gee" and "I Got a Boy"	
2013 Hong Kong Asian Pop Music Festival	March 22, 2013	Hong Kong Convention and Exhibition Centre	Hong Kong	China	"Dancing Queen" and "I Got a Boy	
Super Joint Concert in Thailand	March 30, 2013	Rajamangala Stadium	Bangkok	Thailand	"Genie", "The Boys", "Hoot", "Gee", "Dancing Queen" and "I Got a Boy"	
2013 Dream Concert	May 11, 2013	Sangnam Stadium	Seoul	South Korea	"The Boys" and "I Got a Boy"	
Happy 4 K-pop Concert in Taiwan	May 26, 2013	Taipei Nangang Exhibition Center	Taipei	Taiwan	"Genie", "The Boys", "Mr. Taxi", "Run Devil Run", "I Got a Boy" and "Gee" (Note: Sooyoung was absent)	
Korea-China Friendship Concert	July 3, 2013	Olympic Sports Center Gymnasium	Beijing	China	"Genie" and "I Got a Boy"	
4th Incheon Korean Music Wave	September 1, 2013	Incheon Munhak Stadium	Incheon	South Korea	"I Got a Boy" and "Dancing Queen"	
2014 U-Express Live	March 2, 2014	Saitama Super Arena	Saitama	Japan	"Mr. Taxi", "Paparazzi", "My Oh My" "Galaxy Supernova", "Love & Girls"	
2014 HEC Korea Festival	March 22, 2014	Quân khu 7 Stadium	Ho Chi Minh City	Vietnam	"I Got a Boy", "Genie", "The Boys", "Gee" and "Mr.Mr."	
2014 Dream Concert	June 7, 2014	Sangnam Stadium	Seoul	South Korea	"Mr.Mr." and "Hoot"	
Best of Best in Hong Kong	August 2, 2014	AsiaWorld–Arena	Hong Kong	China	"Genie", "Mr.Mr.", "Mr. Taxi", "Hoot", "Goodbye", "Oh!" and "Genie"	
2014 KCON LA	August 10, 2014	Los Angeles Memorial Sports Arena	Los Angeles	United States	"Mr.Mr.", "Hoot", "Genie", "Mr. Taxi" and "Gee" (Note: Sooyoung was absent)	
Korean Music Wave in Beijing	October 25, 2014	Beijing National Stadium	Beijing	China	"Mr.Mr." and "Gee"	
Best of Best in Philippines	April 12, 2015	Philippine Arena	Bulacan	Philippines	"Mr. Taxi", "Genie", "Hoot", "Gee", "Kissing You", "Complete" and "Mr.Mr."	
2015 Live Monster	July 4, 2015	Makuhari Messe	Chiba	Japan	"Catch Me If You Can", "Mr. Taxi", "Galaxy Supernova", "Chain Reaction" and "Genie"	
2015 Ulsan Summer Festival	July 27, 2015	Ulsan Stadium	Ulsan	South Korea	"Party", "Check" and "Gee"	
2015 KCON NY	August 8, 2015	Prudential Center	Newark	United States	"Catch Me If You Can", "Check", "Genie", "Gee" and "Party"	
2015 DMZ Peace Concert	August 14, 2015	Imjingak Pyeonghwa Nuri Park	Paju	South Korea	"Party" and "Gee" (Note: Tiffany was absent)	
2015 Grand K-pop Festival	September 4, 2015	Seoul Olympic Stadium	Seoul	South Korea	"Lion Heart", "Party", "Hoot" and "Gee"	
DMC Festival: K-pop Super Concert	September 5, 2015	Sangam Cultural Square	Seoul	South Korea	"Lion Heart" and "Gee"	
DMC Festival: Radio DJ Concert	September 6, 2015	Sangam Cultural Square	Seoul	South Korea	"Lion Heart" and "Gee"	
Busan One Music Festival	October 1, 2016	Busan Asiad Main Stadium	Busan	South Korea	"Lion Heart" and "Gee"	
DMC Festival: Korean Music Wave	October 8, 2016	Sangam Cultural Square	Seoul	South Korea	"Gee" and "Lion Heart"	
Going Together Concert	April 1, 2017	Vietnam National Convention Center	Ha Noi	Vietnam	"Genie", "Hoot", "Party", "Gee" and "Lion Heart"	
2017 DMZ Peace Concert	August 12, 2017	Imjingak Pyeonghwa Nuri Park	Paju	South Korea	"Holiday"	

== Benefit concerts ==
List of benefit concert performances, showing event names, dates, locations, and songs performed
Event	Date	Venue	City	Country	Performed song(s)	Ref.
2007 MBC Special Project Disabled Festival - "I have a dream"	August 31, 2007	Busan Exhibition and Convention Center	Busan	South Korea	"In Summer" (Deux cover), "Woman of Beach" (Cool cover) (Note: Sung with Kim Dong-wan), "Soul Mate" (Solid cover) (Note: Sung with Kim Dong-wan)	
Sharing and Peace Concert	October 13, 2007	Incheon Munhak Stadium	Incheon	South Korea	"Into The New World"	
Taean Salvation - Love Sharing Hope Concert	March 8, 2008	Sejong University	Seoul	South Korea	"Kissing You", "Ooh La-La!" and "Girls' Generation"	
Let's Start Concert	August 28, 2010	Seoul Olympic Stadium	Seoul	South Korea	"Run Devil Run" and "Oh!"	
G20 Road For Hope Concert	November 6, 2010	KBS Hall	Seoul	South Korea	"Hoot"	
KIA MotorsHope Dream Concert	October 24, 2010	Sangmu Citizen's Park.	Seoul	South Korea	"Hoot"	
2010 Love Sharing Concert	November 14, 2010	Olympic Gymnastics Arena	Seoul	South Korea	"Hoot"	
Busan MBC Charity Power Concert	October 2, 2011	Busan Asiad Main Stadium	Busan	South Korea	"Run Devil Run", "Hoot" and "Gee"	
2011 Love Sharing Concert	November 6, 2011	Olympic Gymnastics Arena	Seoul	South Korea	"The Boys"	

== Sporting events ==
List of sporting event performances, showing event names, dates, locations, and songs performed
Event	Date	Venue	City	Country	Performed song(s)	Ref.
2007 Hyundai Motor Cup World Championship	August 11, 2007	Olympic Park Peace Plaza	Seoul	South Korea	"Into The New World"	
Doosan Bears–Kia Tigers 2007 Korea Professional Baseball season	August 15, 2007	Jamsil Baseball Stadium	Seoul	South Korea	"Into The New World"	
KBO League Golden Glove Award	December 11, 2007	COEX	Seoul	South Korea	"Girls' Generation"	
2008 Korean Basketball League All-star	March 1, 2008	Jamsil Students' Gymnasium	Seoul	South Korea	"Kissing You" and "Girls' Generation"	
JOMO Cup Halftime show	August 8, 2009		Seoul	South Korea	"Genie" and "Gee"	
International e-sports Festival	October 30, 2009		Seoul	South Korea	"Gee" and "Genie"	
LG Mobile World Cup	November 8, 2009		Seoul	South Korea	"Genie", "Gee" and "Chocolate Love"	
2009 V-League	November 19, 2009		Seoul	South Korea	"Genie" and "Gee"	
Special Live 2010 Vancouver Olympic Athletes Welcome - A National Festival	March 7, 2010	Seoul Plaza	Seoul	South Korea	"Gee" (Note: with Lee Seung-hoon, Lee Sang-hwa, Mo Tae-beom) and "Oh!" (Note: Yuri was absent)	
Shinshin Pass Open Bowl Seoul-American Football League	May 22, 2010	Namyangju Stadium	Namyangju	South Korea	"Oh!" and "Gee"	
2018 Pyeongchang Winter Olympics Concert	May 14, 2011	Seoul Plaza	Seoul	South Korea	"Hoot" and "Gee"	
2011 K-League Busan IPark–Gyeongnam FC	October 2, 2011	Busan Gudeok Stadium	Busan	South Korea	"Oh!" (Note: YoonA was absent)	
2015 Malaysian Grand Prix	March 29, 2015	Sepang International Circuit	Kuala Lumpur	Malaysia	"Mr. Taxi", "Genie", "The Boys", "Complete", "Back Hug", "Hoot", "I Got a Boy", "Kissing You", "Gee" and "Mr.Mr." (Note: YoonA was absent)	

== Special broadcasts ==
List of special broadcasts performances, showing event names, official broadcasting dates, locations, and performed songs where applicable
Event	Date	Venue	City	Country	Performed song(s)	Ref.
SBS Gayo Daejeon	December 29, 2007	Jangchung Arena	Seoul	South Korea	"Pierrot Smiling at Us" (Kim Wan Sun cover), "I'm Your Girl" (S.E.S cover) (Note: Taeyeon, Tiffany, YoonA performed), "Dreams Come True" (S.E.S cover), "No. 1" (BoA cover) and "Girls' Generation"	
KBS Gayo Daechukje	December 30, 2007	KBS Hall	Seoul	South Korea	"Girls' Generation", "Hey-Mickey" (Bring It On version cover) and "I Still Don't Know Love" (Lee Jiyeon cover)	
MBC Gayo Daejejeon	December 31, 2008	MBC Dream Center	Goyang	South Korea	"Kissing You" and "Girls' Generation"	
SBS Gayo Daejeon	December 29, 2009	KINTEX	Goyang	South Korea	"Gee"	
KBS Gayo Daechukje	December 30, 2009	KBS Hall	Seoul	South Korea	"Rhythm Nation" (Janet Jackson dance cover) (Note: Hyoyeon, Yuri, Sooyoung, YoonA, Seohyun performed), "Gee", "I'll Be There" (The Jackson 5 cover) (Note: Taeyeon, Jessica, Sunny, Tiffany performed), "Smooth Criminal" (Michael Jackson dance cover) (Note: Hyoyeon, Yuri, Sooyoung, YoonA, Seohyun performed with members of Super Junior)	
MBC Gayo Daejejeon	December 31, 2009	MBC Dream Center	Goyang	South Korea	"Santa Baby" (Eartha Kitt and Henri René cover), Intro, "Genie" and "Gee"	
SBS Gayo Daejeon	December 29, 2010	KINTEX		South Korea	"Circus" (Britney Spears cover) (Note: Seohyun performed with Mir MBLAQ, Chansung 2PM, Taemin SHINee, Sulli f(x), Lizzy After School, Kang Jiyoung KARA), "Hoot" and "Snowy Wish"	
KBS Gayo Daechukje	December 30, 2010	KBS Hall	Seoul	South Korea	"Hoot" and "Oh!"	
MBC Gayo Daejejeon	December 31, 2010	MBC Dream Center	Goyang	South Korea	"Run Devil Run", "Hoot" and "Oh!"	
SBS Gayo Daejeon	December 29, 2011	KINTEX	Goyang	South Korea	"The Boys"	
KBS Gayo Daechukje	December 30, 2011	KBS Hall	Seoul	South Korea	"Festival" (Uhm Jung-hwa cover) and "The Boys"	
MBC Gayo Daejejeon	December 31, 2011	Online recording			"Diamond" and "The Boys"	
62nd NHK Kōhaku Uta Gassen	December 31, 2011	NHK Hall	Tokyo	Japan	"Genie" (Japanese version)	
KBS Gayo Daechukje	December 27, 2013	KBS Hall	Seoul	South Korea	"I Got a Boy" (Note: YoonA was absent)	
SBS Gayo Daejeon	December 29, 2013	KINTEX	Goyang	South Korea	"Express 999" and "I Got a Boy"	
MBC Gayo Daejejeon	December 31, 2013	MBC Dream Center	Goyang	South Korea	"I Got a Boy" (Note: YoonA was absent)	
KBS Gayo Daechukje	December 26, 2014	KBS Hall	Seoul	South Korea	"Mr.Mr."	
MBC Gayo Daejejeon	December 31, 2014	MBC Dream Center	Goyang	South Korea	"Mr.Mr."	
SBS Gayo Daejeon	December 27, 2015	COEX Hall	Seoul	South Korea	"Lion Heart" and "Catch Me If You Can"	
KBS Gayo Daechukje	December 30, 2015	Gocheok Sky Dome	Seoul	South Korea	"Party" (Winter remix) and "Lion Heart"	
MBC Gayo Daejejeon	December 31, 2015	MBC Dream Center	Goyang	South Korea	"Genie" (New Year remix) and "Lion Heart"	
Jiangsu TV Spring Festival Gala	February 8, 2016	Nanjing International Expo Center	Nanjing	China	"Lion Heart" and "Gee"	

== Television shows ==
List of TV performances, showing event names, official broadcasting dates, locations, and performed songs where applicable
Event	Date	Venue	City	Performed song(s)	Ref.
Inkigayo	August 5, 2007	SBS Open Hall	Seoul	"Into The New World"	
Show! Music Core	August 11, 2007	MBC Dream Center	Goyang	"Into The New World"	
Music Bank	August 12, 2007	KBS New Wing Open Hall	Seoul	"Into The New World"	
M! Countdown	August 16, 2007	CJ E&M Center Studio	Seoul	"Into The New World" and "Beginning"	
Show! Music Core	August 18, 2007	MBC Dream Center	Goyang	"Into The New World"	
Inkigayo	August 19, 2007	SBS Open Hall	Seoul	"Into The New World"	
Music Bank	August 26, 2007	KBS New Wing Open Hall	Seoul	"Into The New World"	
Show! Music Tank	August 28, 2007	Lafesta Culture Street	Gyeonggi	"Into The New World" and "Beginning"	
M! Countdown	August 30, 2007	CJ E&M Center Studio	Seoul	"Into The New World"	
Show! Music Core	September 1, 2007	MBC Dream Center	Goyang	"Into The New World"	
Show! Music Tank	September 4, 2007	Lafesta Culture Street	Gyeonggi	"Into The New World"	
MTV Live Wow Special	September 15, 2007	SBS Open Hall	Seoul	"Into The New World"	
M! Countdown	October 11, 2007	CJ E&M Center Studio	Seoul	"Into The New World", "Girls On Top" (BoA cover) and "My Name"	
Music Bank	November 9, 2007	KBS New Wing Open Hall	Seoul	"Girls' Generation"	
Inkigayo	November 11, 2007	SBS Open Hall	Seoul	"Girls' Generation"	
Inkigayo	November 25, 2007	SBS Open Hall	Seoul	"Girls' Generation"	
Inkigayo	April 13, 2008	SBS Open Hall	Seoul	"Baby Baby"	
Kim Jung-eun's Chocolate	February 25, 2009	SBS Open Hall	Seoul	"Fly me to the moon" (Note: Jessica solo), "Adult Ceremony" (Park Ji-yoon cover) (Note: Yuri, Sooyoung, Seohyun performed), "My Lips like Warm Coffee" (Sharp cover) (Note: Taeyeon, Sunny, Tiffany, Hyoyeon, Yuri, YoonA, Seohyun performed), "Just a Feeling" (S.E.S cover), "Way to Go" and "Gee"	
You Hee-yeol's Sketchbook	July 31, 2009	KBS hall	Seoul	"Genie", "Etude" and "Gee"	
Music Bank	February 19, 2010	KBS New Wing Open Hall	Seoul	"Oh!"	
Music Bank	March 19, 2010	KBS New Wing Open Hall	Seoul	"Run Devil Run"	
Show! Music Core	March 20, 2010	MBC Dream Center	Goyang	"Run Devil Run"	
Inkigayo	March 21, 2010	SBS Open Hall	Seoul	"Run Devil Run"	
Music Bank	March 26, 2010	KBS New Wing Open Hall	Seoul	"Run Devil Run"	
Show! Music Core	April 10, 2010	MBC Dream Center	Goyang	"Run Devil Run"	
Kim Jung-eun's Chocolate	April 10, 2010	SBS Open Hall	Seoul	"Deja Vu" (Note: Hyoyeon, Yuri, YoonA performed), "Sweet Dream" (Note: Taeyeon, Tiffany performed)	
Inkigayo	April 11, 2010	SBS Open Hall	Seoul	"Run Devil Run"	
Music Bank	April 30, 2010	KBS New Wing Open Hall	Seoul	"Oh!" and "Run Devil Run"	
Inkigayo	May 2, 2010	SBS Open Hall	Seoul	"Oh!" and "Run Devil Run"	
You Hee-yeol's Sketchbook	May 7, 2010	KBS hall	Seoul	"Run Devil Run" and "Show! Show! Show!"	
Show! Music Core	May 8, 2010	MBC Dream Center	Goyang	"Run Devil Run"	
Music Bank	October 29, 2010	KBS New Wing Open Hall	Seoul	"Hoot"	
Show! Music Core	October 30, 2010	MBC Dream Center	Goyang	"My Best Friend" and "Hoot"	
Inkigayo	October 31, 2010	SBS Open Hall	Seoul	"Mistake" and "Hoot"	
Music Bank	November 5, 2010	KBS New Wing Open Hall	Seoul	"Hoot"	
Show! Music Core	November 6, 2010	MBC Dream Center	Goyang	"Hoot"	
Inkigayo	November 7, 2010	SBS Open Hall	Seoul	"Hoot"	
Music Bank	November 11, 2010	KBS New Wing Open Hall	Seoul	"Hoot"	
Show! Music Core	November 12, 2010	MBC Dream Center	Goyang	"Hoot"	
Inkigayo	November 13, 2010	SBS Open Hall	Seoul	"Hoot"	
Music Bank	November 19, 2010	KBS New Wing Open Hall	Seoul	"Hoot"	
Show! Music Core	November 20, 2010	MBC Dream Center	Goyang	"Hoot"	
Inkigayo	November 21, 2010	SBS Open Hall	Seoul	"Hoot"	
Kim Jung-eun's Chocolate	November 21, 2010	SBS Open Hall	Seoul	"Oh!", "Gee", "Hoot" and "Mistake"	
Kim Jung-eun's Chocolate	November 22, 2010	SBS Open Hall	Seoul	"Oh!", "Gee", "Hoot" and "Mistake"	
Inkigayo	November 28, 2010	SBS Open Hall	Seoul	"Hoot"	
Music Bank	October 21, 2011	KBS New Wing Open Hall	Seoul	"Mr.Taxi" and "The Boys"	
Show! Music Core	October 22, 2011	MBC Dream Center	Goyang	"Mr.Taxi" and "The Boys"	
Inkigayo	October 23, 2011	SBS Open Hall	Seoul	"Mr.Taxi" and "The Boys"	
M! Countdown	October 27, 2011	CJ E&M Center Studio	Seoul	"The Boys"	
Music Bank	October 28, 2011	KBS New Wing Open Hall	Seoul	"The Boys"	
Show! Music Core	October 29, 2011	MBC Dream Center	Goyang	"The Boys"	
Inkigayo	October 30, 2011	SBS Open Hall	Seoul	"The Boys"	
Music Bank	November 3, 2011	KBS New Wing Open Hall	Seoul	"The Boys"	
Show! Music Core	November 5, 2011	MBC Dream Center	Goyang	"The Boys"	
M! Countdown	November 10, 2011	CJ E&M Center Studio	Seoul	"The Boys"	
Music Bank	November 11, 2011	KBS New Wing Open Hall	Seoul	"The Boys"	
Inkigayo	November 13, 2011	SBS Open Hall	Seoul	"Mr.Taxi" and "The Boys"	
Music Bank	November 18, 2011	KBS New Wing Open Hall	Seoul	"The Boys"	
Show! Music Core	November 19, 2011	MBC Dream Center	Goyang	"The Boys"	
Inkigayo	November 20, 2011	SBS Open Hall	Seoul	"The Boys"	
You Hee-yeol's Sketchbook	December 2, 2011	KBS hall	Seoul	"The Boys", "Mr. Taxi" and "Snowy Wish" (Note: YoonA was absent)	
Music Bank	December 16, 2011	KBS New Wing Open Hall	Seoul	"Mr.Taxi"	
Inkigayo	December 18, 2011	SBS Open Hall	Seoul	"Mr.Taxi"	
Inkigayo	December 25, 2011	SBS Open Hall	Seoul	"Mr.Taxi"	
The Late Show with David Letterman	January 31, 2012	Ed Sullivan Theater	New York City	"The Boys" (English version remix)	
Live! with Kelly	February 1, 2012	7 Hudson Square	New York City	"The Boys" (English version)	
Le Grand Journal	February 9, 2012	Studios Rive Gauche	Paris	"The Boys" (English version)	
M! Countdown	January 3, 2013	CJ E&M Center Studio	Seoul	"Dancing Queen" and "I Got a Boy"	
Music Bank	January 4, 2013	KBS New Wing Open Hall	Seoul	"Dancing Queen" and "I Got a Boy"	
Show! Music Core	January 5, 2013	MBC Dream Center	Goyang	"Dancing Queen" and "I Got a Boy"	
Inkigayo	January 6, 2013	SBS Open Hall	Seoul	"Dancing Queen" and "I Got a Boy"	
M! Countdown	January 10, 2013	CJ E&M Center Studio	Seoul	"I Got a Boy"	
Music Bank	January 11, 2013	KBS New Wing Open Hall	Seoul	"I Got a Boy"	
Show! Music Core	January 12, 2013	MBC Dream Center	Goyang	"I Got a Boy"	
Inkigayo	January 13, 2013	SBS Open Hall	Seoul	"I Got a Boy"	
M! Countdown	January 17, 2013	CJ E&M Center Studio	Seoul	"I Got a Boy"	
Music Bank	January 18, 2013	KBS New Wing Open Hall	Seoul	"I Got a Boy"	
You Hee-yeol's Sketchbook	January 18, 2013	KBS hall	Seoul	"I Got a Boy", "Dancing Queen" , "Genie" and "Gee"	
Show! Music Core	January 19, 2013	MBC Dream Center	Goyang	"I Got a Boy"	
Inkigayo	January 20, 2013	SBS Open Hall	Seoul	"I Got a Boy"	
M! Countdown	January 24, 2013	CJ E&M Center Studio	Seoul	"I Got a Boy"	
Music Bank	January 25, 2013	KBS New Wing Open Hall	Seoul	"I Got a Boy"	
Show! Music Core	January 26, 2013	MBC Dream Center	Goyang	"I Got a Boy"	
Inkigayo	January 27, 2013	SBS Open Hall	Seoul	"I Got a Boy"	
The Show	February 20, 2013	SBS Prism Tower	Seoul	"I Got a Boy"	
M! Countdown	March 6, 2014	CJ E&M Center Studio	Seoul	"Wait a Minute" and "Mr.Mr."	
Music Bank	March 7, 2014	KBS New Wing Open Hall	Seoul	"Back Hug" and "Mr.Mr."	
Show! Music Core	March 8, 2014	MBC Dream Center	Goyang	"Wait a Minute" and "Mr.Mr."	
Inkigayo	March 9, 2014	SBS Open Hall	Seoul	"Back Hug" and "Mr.Mr."	
The Show	March 11, 2014	SBS Prism Tower	Seoul	"Mr.Mr."	
M! Countdown	March 13, 2014	CJ E&M Center Studio	Seoul	"Mr.Mr."	
Music Bank	March 14, 2014	KBS New Wing Open Hall	Seoul	"Mr.Mr."	
You Hee-yeol's Sketchbook	March 14, 2014	KBS hall	Seoul	"Mr.Mr.", "Goodbye" and "Kissing You"	
Show! Music Core	March 15, 2014	MBC Dream Center	Goyang	"Mr.Mr."	
Inkigayo	March 16, 2014	SBS Open Hall	Seoul	"Mr.Mr."	
Show Champion	March 19, 2014	Bitmaru Broadcasting Center	Goyang	"Mr.Mr."	
Show! Music Core	March 22, 2014	MBC Dream Center	Goyang	"Mr.Mr."	
Inkigayo	March 23, 2014	SBS Open Hall	Seoul	"Mr.Mr."	
Music Bank	March 28, 2014	KBS New Wing Open Hall	Seoul	"Mr.Mr."	
Inkigayo	March 30, 2014	SBS Open Hall	Seoul	"Mr.Mr."	
Music Bank	July 10, 2015	KBS New Wing Open Hall	Seoul	"Check" and "Party"	
Show! Music Core	July 11, 2015	MBC Dream Center	Goyang	"Check" and "Party"	
Inkigayo	July 12, 2015	SBS Open Hall	Seoul	"Check" and "Party"	
The Show	July 14, 2015	SBS Prism Tower	Seoul	"Party"	
Show Champion	July 15, 2015	Bitmaru Broadcasting Center	Goyang	"Party"	
M! Countdown	July 16, 2015	CJ E&M Center Studio	Seoul	"Party"	
Music Bank	July 17, 2015	KBS New Wing Open Hall	Seoul	"Party"	
Show! Music Core	July 18, 2015	MBC Dream Center	Goyang	"Party"	
Inkigayo	July 19, 2015	SBS Open Hall	Seoul	"Party"	
M! Countdown	July 23, 2015	CJ E&M Center Studio	Seoul	"Party"	
Music Bank	July 24, 2015	KBS New Wing Open Hall	Seoul	"Party"	
Music Bank	August 21, 2015	KBS New Wing Open Hall	Seoul	"You Think" and "Lion Heart"	
Show! Music Core	August 22, 2015	MBC Dream Center	Goyang	"Show Girls", "You Think" and "Lion Heart",	
Inkigayo	August 23, 2015	SBS Open Hall	Seoul	"You Think" and "Lion Heart"	
The Show	August 25, 2015	SBS Prism Tower	Seoul	"Lion Heart"	
Show Champion	August 26, 2015	Bitmaru Broadcasting Center	Goyang	"Lion Heart"	
M! Countdown	August 27, 2015	CJ E&M Center Studio	Seoul	"Lion Heart"	
Music Bank	August 28, 2015	KBS New Wing Open Hall	Seoul	"Lion Heart"	
Show! Music Core	August 29, 2015	MBC Dream Center	Goyang	"Lion Heart"	
Inkigayo	August 30, 2015	SBS Open Hall	Seoul	"Lion Heart"	
Tencent K-Pop Live	August 31, 2015	Wapop Hall	Seoul	"Party", "Check", "Genie", "Gee", "One Afternoon", "Mr.Mr.", "You Think" and "Lion Heart"	
M! Countdown	September 3, 2015	CJ E&M Center Studio	Seoul	"Lion Heart"	
Music Bank	September 4, 2015	KBS New Wing Open Hall	Seoul	"Lion Heart"	
You Hee-yeol's Sketchbook	September 4, 2015		Seoul	"Party", "Lion Heart" and "Into The New World" (Ballad version)	
Inkigayo	September 6, 2015	SBS Open Hall	Seoul	"Lion Heart"	
Music Bank	September 11, 2015	KBS New Wing Open Hall	Seoul	"Lion Heart"	
Inkigayo	September 13, 2015	SBS Open Hall	Seoul	"Lion Heart"	
M! Countdown	August 10, 2017	CJ E&M Center Studio	Seoul	"All Night" and "Holiday"	
Show! Music Core	August 12, 2017	MBC Dream Center	Goyang	"All Night" and "Holiday"	
Inkigayo	August 13, 2017	SBS Open Hall	Seoul	"All Night" and "Holiday"	
Music Bank	August 19, 2022	KBS New Wing Open Hall	Seoul	"Forever 1"	
Inkigayo	August 21, 2022	SBS Open Hall	Seoul	"Forever 1"	
Show! Music Core	August 24, 2022	MBC Dream Center	Goyang	"Forever 1"	

== Other lives ==
List of miscellaneous live performances, showing event/venue names, dates, locations, and songs performed where applicable
Event	Date	Venue	City	Country	Performed song(s)	Ref.
KBS-1TV "Experiencing the World of Life"	September 23, 2007	30th Armored Brigade (South Korea)	Gyeonggi	South Korea	"Into The New World" and "Beginning"	
Seongnam e-Blue Concert	October 7, 2007	Seongnam Sports Complex	Seongnam	South Korea	"Into The New World" (Remix version) and "Beginning"	
2007 Incheon Airport Sky Festival	October 12, 2007	Incheon International Airport	Incheon	South Korea	"Into The New World"	
2007 F/W Hallyu Fashion Festival	October 21, 2007	Seoul Plaza	Seoul	South Korea	"Into The New World"	
2007 Sacheon Aerospace Expo	October 25, 2007	Sacheon Industrial ComplexCultural Center	Sacheon	South Korea	"Into The New World" and "Perfect for You" (Note: Taeyeon was absent)	
Dangjin Song Festival	December 11, 2007	Dangjin Sports Complex Indoor Gymnasium	Dangjin	South Korea	"Ooh La-La!"	
2007 Dungeon & Fighter Festival	December 30, 2007	COEX	Seoul	South Korea	"Girls' Generation", "Ooh La-La!" and "Into The New World"	
2009 Dungeon & Fighter Festival	July 19, 2009					
GirlsAward 2010 Autumn/Winter	September 18, 2010	Yoyogi National Gymnasium	Tokyo	Japan	"Run Devil Run", "Gee" and "Genie" (Japanese version)	
Korean International Style Show in Japan	March 25, 2012	Yoyogi National Gymnasium	Tokyo	Japan	"Hoot" and "The Boys" (Note: Jessica was absent)	
Korean International Style Show in Japan	March 26, 2012	Yoyogi National Gymnasium	Tokyo	Japan	"Run Devil Run" and "The Boys" (Note: Jessica was absent)	
Girls' Generation Yakult Diet LOOK Concert	September 1, 2012	Olympic Hall	Seoul	South Korea	"Genie", "Mr.Taxi", "The Boys" and "Gee"	
1st GS & Concert	October 21, 2012	Jamsil Arena	Seoul	South Korea	"Run Devil Run", "Hoot", "Mr.Taxi", "The Boys"	
2013 Asia Style Collection	June 22, 2013	Singapore Expo	Singapore		"Hoot", "Dancing Queen", "I Got a Boy" and "Gee" (Note: Sooyoung was absent)	

== See also ==
- Girls' Generation discography
- Girls' Generation filmography
- Girls' Generation videography
- List of songs by Girls' Generation
- List of awards and nominations received by Girls' Generation
