= List of awards and nominations received by Girls' Generation =

Girls' Generation awards and nominations
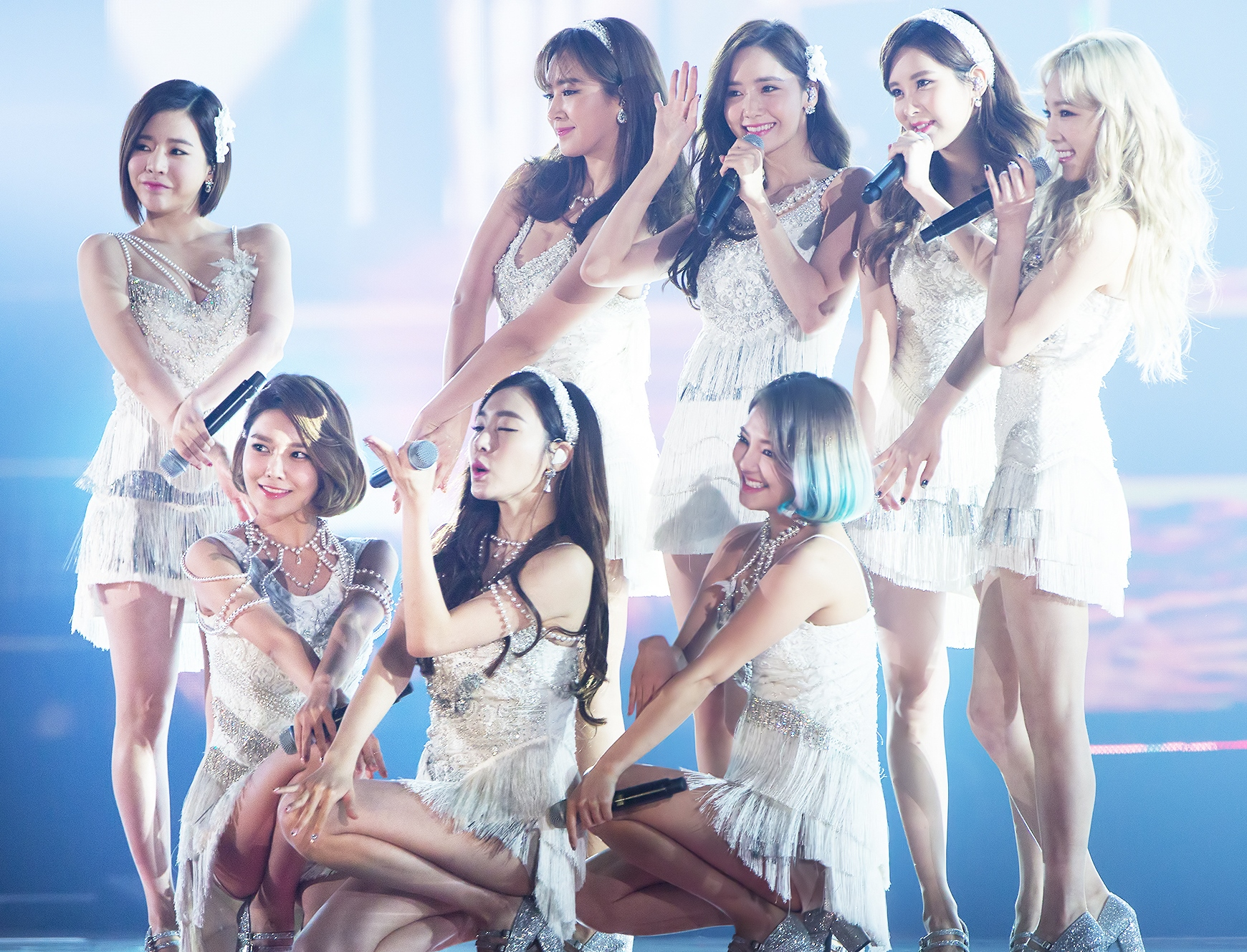
- Girls' Generation performing in December 2015
Awards and nominations
Award	Wins	Nominations
Asia Artist Awards	0	3
Asia Model Festival Awards	2	2
Asia Song Festival	1	1
Billboard Japan Music Awards	0	2
Bugs Music Awards	6	7
Cyworld Digital Music Awards	3	3
D Awards	0	1
daf BAMA Music Awards	0	3
Daum Life On Awards	1	1
Gaon Chart Music Awards	4	11
Golden Disc Awards	15	32
Hanteo Music Awards	0	1
Huading Awards	1	1
Incheon Culture Day Ceremony	1	1
iF Design Award	2	2
iQiYi All-Star Carnival	1	1
Japan Best Jewellery Wearer Awards	1	1
Japan Gold Disc Award	10	10
Japan Record Awards	1	2
KBS Song Festival	1	2
Korea Advertising Awards	1	1
Korea Best Dresser Award	1	1
Korea PD Awards	1	1
Korea Republic Seoul Cultural Art Awards	1	1
Korean Broadcasting Awards	1	1
Korean Cable TV Awards	1	1
Korean Cultural Entertainment Awards	3	3
Korean Entertainment Arts Awards	3	3
Korean Ministry of Culture and Tourism	1	1
Korean Music Awards	2	4
Korean Popular Culture and Arts Awards	1	1
Korean Wave Industry Award	1	1
MBC Entertainment Awards	1	1
MBC Gayo Artist Awards	1	1
Melon Music Awards	12	27
Mnet 20's Choice Awards	1	12
Mnet Asian Music Awards	4	32
Monkey3 Best Songs 30	1	1
MTV Asia Awards	0	1
MTV Video Music Awards Japan	3	5
Myx Music Award	0	4
Nickelodeon Korea Kids' Choice Awards	3	5
Proud Korean Awards	1	1
Philippine K-pop Awards	2	2
Red Dot Design Award	1	1
Republic of Korea Entertainment Arts Awards	1	1
SBS MTV Best of the Best	1	6
SEED Awards	2	2
Seoul Music Awards	12	22
Singapore E-Awards	0	1
Soompi Awards	1	1
Space Shower Music Video Awards	1	1
Sports Korea Awards	6	6
Style Icon Asia	4	4
Taiwan KKBOX Awards	1	1
Teen Choice Awards	0	2
World Music Awards	0	5
YouTube Music Awards	1	1

Totals (Note: Certain award groups do not simply award one winner. They acknowledge several different recipients, have runners-up, and have third place. Since this is a specific recognition and is different from losing an award, runner-up mentions are considered wins in this award tally. For simplification and to avoid errors, each award in this list has been presumed to have had a prior nomination.)
- Wins: 125
- Nominations: 250

South Korean girl group Girls' Generation has received various awards and nominations since their debut in 2007. They rose to fame in 2009 with their hit single, "Gee", which later became known as "Song of the Decade". Within two days, the song became number one on all music charts and broke the record for longest-running number one on Music Bank with nine consecutive wins. The group then released several hit singles such as "Tell Me Your Wish (Genie)" in 2009, "Oh!" in 2010, "The Boys" in 2011, "I Got a Boy" in 2013 and "Lion Heart" in 2015. The group became the first girl group to win both a Disk Daesang (2010) and a Digital Daesang (2009) at the Golden Disc Awards, and also the first girl group to win a Daesang award three times in a row.

== Awards and nominations ==
The name of the award ceremony, year presented, category, nominee or work, and the result of the award
Award ceremony	Year	Category	Nominee / work	Result	Ref.
Asia Artist Awards	2016	Most Popular Artist (Singer)	Girls' Generation	Nominated	
Asia Artist Awards	2017	Most Popular Artist (Singer)	Girls' Generation	Nominated	
Asia Artist Awards	2018	Most Popular Artist (Singer)	Girls' Generation	Nominated	
Asia Model Awards	2008	BBF Popular Singer Award	Girls' Generation	Won	
Asia Model Awards	2011	Asia Star Award	Girls' Generation	Won	
Asia Song Festival	2008	The Best Asian Artist Award	Girls' Generation	Won	
Billboard Japan Music Awards	2010	Excellent Pop Artist 2010	Girls' Generation	Nominated	
Billboard Japan Music Awards	2012	Top Pop Artist 2012	Girls' Generation	Nominated	
Bugs Music Awards	2009	Song of the Year	"Gee"	Nominated	
Bugs Music Awards	2009	Girl Group of the Year	Girls' Generation	Won	
Bugs Music Awards	2010	Song of the Year	"Oh!"	Won	
Bugs Music Awards	2010	Music Video of the Year	"Oh!"	Won	
Bugs Music Awards	2010	Idol of the Year	Girls' Generation	Won	
Bugs Music Awards	2020	20th Anniversary – Most Loved Artists	Girls' Generation	Won	
Cyworld Digital Music Awards	2007	Rookie of the Month – August	"Into the New World"	Won	
Cyworld Digital Music Awards	2009	Song of the Month – January	"Gee"	Won	
Cyworld Digital Music Awards	2009	Bonsang (Best 10)	Girls' Generation	Won	
D Awards	2025	Best Girl Group Popularity Award	Girls' Generation	Nominated	
daf BAMA Music Awards	2017	Best Album	Holiday Night	Nominated	
daf BAMA Music Awards	2017	Best Group	Girls' Generation	Nominated	
daf BAMA Music Awards	2017	Best Video	"Holiday"	Nominated	
Daum Life On Awards	2011	Music Video of the Year	"Oh!"	Won	
Gaon Chart Music Awards	2012	Album of the Year – 4th quarter	The Boys	Won	
Gaon Chart Music Awards	2012	Song of the Year – October	"The Boys"	Nominated	
Gaon Chart Music Awards	2012	Oricon Special Award	Girls' Generation	Won	
Gaon Chart Music Awards	2014	Album of the Year – 1st quarter	I Got a Boy	Won	
Gaon Chart Music Awards	2014	Song of the Year – January	"I Got a Boy"	Won	
Gaon Chart Music Awards	2015	Song of the Year – March	"Mr.Mr."	Nominated	
Gaon Chart Music Awards	2015	Album of the Year – 1st quarter	Mr.Mr.	Nominated	
Gaon Chart Music Awards	2016	Song of the Year – July	"Party"	Nominated	
Gaon Chart Music Awards	2016	Song of the Year – September	"Lion Heart"	Nominated	
Gaon Chart Music Awards	2016	Album of the Year – 3rd quarter	Lion Heart	Nominated	
Gaon Chart Music Awards	2018	Album of the Year – 3rd quarter	Holiday Night	Nominated	
Golden Disc Awards	2007	Popularity Award	Girls' Generation	Won	
Golden Disc Awards	2007	Rookie Award	Girls' Generation	Won	
Golden Disc Awards	2007	Disk Bonsang Award	Girls' Generation	Nominated	
Golden Disc Awards	2009	Digital Daesang Award	"Gee"	Won	
Golden Disc Awards	2009	Digital Bonsang Award	"Gee"	Won	
Golden Disc Awards	2009	Digital Bonsang Award	"Genie"	Nominated	
Golden Disc Awards	2009	Popularity Award	Girls' Generation	Nominated	
Golden Disc Awards	2010	Popularity Award	Girls' Generation	Won	
Golden Disc Awards	2010	Disk Bonsang Award	Oh!	Won	
Golden Disc Awards	2010	Disk Daesang Award	Oh!	Won	
Golden Disc Awards	2010	Digital Bonsang Award	"Run Devil Run"	Nominated	
Golden Disc Awards	2010	Digital Bonsang Award	"Oh!"	Nominated	
Golden Disc Awards	2012	Digital Bonsang Award	"The Boys"	Won	
Golden Disc Awards	2012	Digital Daesang Award	"The Boys"	Won	
Golden Disc Awards	2012	Disk Bonsang Award	The Boys	Nominated	
Golden Disc Awards	2012	Popularity Award	Girls' Generation	Nominated	
Golden Disc Awards	2014	Disk Bonsang Award	I Got a Boy	Won	
Golden Disc Awards	2014	Disk Daesang Award	I Got a Boy	Nominated	
Golden Disc Awards	2014	Popularity Award	Girls' Generation	Won	
Golden Disc Awards	2014	Digital Bonsang Award	"I Got a Boy"	Nominated	
Golden Disc Awards	2015	Digital Bonsang Award	"Mr.Mr."	Nominated	
Golden Disc Awards	2015	Disk Bonsang Award	Mr.Mr.	Won	
Golden Disc Awards	2015	Disk Daesang Award	Mr.Mr.	Nominated	
Golden Disc Awards	2015	Popularity Award	Girls' Generation	Won	
Golden Disc Awards	2016	Digital Bonsang Award	"Lion Heart"	Won	
Golden Disc Awards	2016	Digital Daesang Award	"Lion Heart"	Nominated	
Golden Disc Awards	2016	Disk Bonsang Award	Lion Heart	Nominated	
Golden Disc Awards	2016	Popularity Award (Korea)	Girls' Generation	Nominated	
Golden Disc Awards	2016	Global Popularity Award	Girls' Generation	Nominated	
Golden Disc Awards	2018	Disk Bonsang Award	Holiday Night	Won	
Golden Disc Awards	2018	Disk Daesang Award	Holiday Night	Nominated	
Golden Disc Awards	2018	Global Popularity Award	Girls' Generation	Nominated	
Hanteo Music Awards	2024	WhosFandom Award – Female	Girls' Generation	Nominated	
Huading Awards	2013	Best Idol Group – Global	Girls' Generation	Won	
Incheon Culture Day Ceremony	2009	Young Artist Award	Girls' Generation	Won	
iF Design Award	2014	Packaging Design	The Boys	Won	
iF Design Award	2014	Packaging Design	I Got a Boy	Won	
iQiYi All-Star Carnival	2015	Best Asian Group	Girls' Generation	Won	
Japan Best Jewellery Wearer Awards	2012	Special Award for Female Category: Singer (Best Jewellery Dresser)	Girls' Generation	Won	
Japan Gold Disc Awards	2011	The Best 5 New Artists (Domestic)	Girls' Generation	Won	
Japan Gold Disc Awards	2011	New Artist of the Year (Domestic)	Girls' Generation	Won	
Japan Gold Disc Awards	2012	Album of the Year (Asia)	Girls' Generation	Won	
Japan Gold Disc Awards	2012	Best 3 Albums (Asia)	Girls' Generation	Won	
Japan Gold Disc Awards	2013	Song of the Year by Download (Asia)	"Paparazzi"	Won	
Japan Gold Disc Awards	2013	Best Music Video (Asia)	The 1st Japan Tour DVD	Won	
Japan Gold Disc Awards	2014	Best 3 Albums (Asia)	Girls' Generation II: Girls & Peace	Won	
Japan Gold Disc Awards	2014	Best 3 Albums (Asia)	Love & Peace	Won	
Japan Gold Disc Awards	2015	Song of the Year by Download (Asia)	"Indestructible"	Won	
Japan Gold Disc Awards	2015	Best 3 Albums (Asia)	The Best	Won	
Japan Record Awards	2010	New Artist	Girls' Generation	Won	
Japan Record Awards	2010	Best New Artist	Girls' Generation	Nominated	
KBS Song Festival	2009	Song of the Year	"Gee"	Nominated	
KBS Song Festival	2010	Song of the Year	"Oh!"	Won	
Korea Advertising Awards	2010	Best Advertising Models Award	Girls' Generation	Won	
Korea Best Dresser Award	2010	Best Singer Dresser	Girls' Generation	Won	
Korea PD Awards	2010	Singer Award	Girls' Generation	Won	
Korea Republic Seoul Cultural Art Awards	2011	Pop Music Award	Girls' Generation	Won	
Korean Broadcasting Awards	2010	Best Singer Award	Girls' Generation	Won	
Korean Cable TV Awards	2009	Best Picture for Variety	Girls' Generation's Hello Baby	Won	
Korean Cultural Entertainment Awards	2009	Artist Daesang	Girls' Generation	Won	
Korean Cultural Entertainment Awards	2009	Teen Musical Artist Award	Girls' Generation	Won	
Korean Cultural Entertainment Awards	2011	Hallyu Grand Award	Girls' Generation	Won	
Korean Entertainment Arts Awards	2007	Best New Female Group	Girls' Generation	Won	
Korean Entertainment Arts Awards	2008	Best Female Group	Girls' Generation	Won	
Korean Entertainment Arts Awards	2010 (Note: The Annual Korean Entertainment Arts Awards was not held in 2009, so two shows were prepared in 2010; a January ceremony for the 2009 prize winners, and an October 23 ceremony for the 2010 prize winners.)	Best Female Group	Girls' Generation	Won	
Korean Ministry of Culture and Tourism	2010	Content Industry Award (Special Honor)	Girls' Generation	Won	
Korean Music Awards	2010	Best Dance & Electronic Song	"Gee"	Nominated	
Korean Music Awards	2010	Song of the Year	"Gee"	Won	
Korean Music Awards	2010	Best Pop Song	"Genie"	Nominated	
Korean Music Awards	2010	Group Musician of the Year Netizen Vote	Girls' Generation	Won	
Korean Wave Industry Award	2010	Pop Culture Award	Girls' Generation	Won	
MBC Entertainment Awards	2009	Special Award (Best Singer)	Girls' Generation	Won	
MBC Gayo Daejejeon	2015	Mango TV Most Popular Artist Award	Girls' Generation	Won	
Melon Music Awards	2009	2009 Top 10 Artists	Girls' Generation	Won	
Melon Music Awards	2009	Artist of the Year	Girls' Generation	Won	
Melon Music Awards	2009	Smart Radio	Girls' Generation	Won	
Melon Music Awards	2009	Mobile Music	Girls' Generation	Won	
Melon Music Awards	2009	Star Award	Girls' Generation	Nominated	
Melon Music Awards	2009	Mania Award	Girls' Generation	Nominated	
Melon Music Awards	2009	Song of the Year	"Gee"	Won	
Melon Music Awards	2009	Odyssey Award	"Gee"	Won	
Melon Music Awards	2009	Album of the Year	Gee	Nominated	
Melon Music Awards	2010	Top 10 Artists	Girls' Generation	Won	
Melon Music Awards	2010	Artist of the Year	Girls' Generation	Won	
Melon Music Awards	2010	Best Dressed Singer	Girls' Generation	Won	
Melon Music Awards	2010	Album of the Year	Oh!	Nominated	
Melon Music Awards	2010	Song of the Year	"Oh!"	Nominated	
Melon Music Awards	2010	Netizen Popular Song	"Oh!"	Nominated	
Melon Music Awards	2010	Music Video of the Year	"Oh!"	Nominated	
Melon Music Awards	2010	Song of the Year	"Run Devil Run"	Nominated	
Melon Music Awards	2010	Netizen Popular Song	"Run Devil Run"	Nominated	
Melon Music Awards	2010	Netizen Popular Song	"Hoot"	Nominated	
Melon Music Awards	2010	Hot Trend	"Hoot"	Won	
Melon Music Awards	2011	Global Star Award	Girls' Generation	Won	
Melon Music Awards	2011	Netizen Popular Song	"The Boys"	Nominated	
Melon Music Awards	2013	Top 10 Artists	Girls' Generation	Nominated	
Melon Music Awards	2013	Netizen Popularity	Girls' Generation	Nominated	
Melon Music Awards	2013	Global Star Award	Girls' Generation	Nominated	
Melon Music Awards	2015	Top 10 Artists	Girls' Generation	Won	
Melon Music Awards	2015	Artist of the Year	Girls' Generation	Nominated	
Mnet 20's Choice Awards	2008	Hot Sweet Music	"Kissing You"	Won	
Mnet 20's Choice Awards	2008	Hot Online Song	"Kissing You"	Nominated	
Mnet 20's Choice Awards	2009	Hot Girl Group Style	Marine Look From "Tell Me Your Wish (Genie)"	Nominated	
Mnet 20's Choice Awards	2009	Hot Girl Group Style	Hot Pants From "Tell Me Your Wish (Genie)"	Nominated	
Mnet 20's Choice Awards	2009	Hot Online Song	"Gee"	Nominated	
Mnet 20's Choice Awards	2009	Hot Performance	Girls' Generation	Nominated	
Mnet 20's Choice Awards	2011	Hot Hallyu Star	Girls' Generation	Nominated	
Mnet 20's Choice Awards	2012	Hot Global Star	Girls' Generation	Nominated	
Mnet 20's Choice Awards	2012	Album of the Year	The Boys	Nominated	
Mnet 20's Choice Awards	2012	Oricon Hallyu Singer	Girls' Generation	Nominated	
Mnet 20's Choice Awards	2013	Hot Performance	Girls' Generation	Nominated	
Mnet 20's Choice Awards	2013	Hot Online Music	"I Got a Boy"	Nominated	
Mnet Asian Music Awards (Note: Before 2009, Mnet Asian Music Awards was called the Mnet Korean Music Festival.)	2007	Best New Female Group	Girls' Generation	Nominated	
Mnet Asian Music Awards	2008	Best Female Group	"Kissing You"	Nominated	
Mnet Asian Music Awards	2008	Best Dance Performance	"Kissing You"	Nominated	
Mnet Asian Music Awards	2008	Auction Style Award	Girls' Generation	Nominated	
Mnet Asian Music Awards	2008	Auction Netizen Popularity Award	Girls' Generation	Nominated	
Mnet Asian Music Awards	2008	Auction Mobile Popularity Award	Girls' Generation	Nominated	
Mnet Asian Music Awards	2009	Best Female Group	"Gee"	Nominated	
Mnet Asian Music Awards	2009	Best Dance Performance	"Gee"	Nominated	
Mnet Asian Music Awards	2009	CGV Popularity Award	Girls' Generation	Nominated	
Mnet Asian Music Awards	2009	Mobile Popularity Award	Girls' Generation	Nominated	
Mnet Asian Music Awards	2009	Overseas Viewers' Award	Girls' Generation	Nominated	
Mnet Asian Music Awards	2010	Best Female Group	Girls' Generation	Nominated	
Mnet Asian Music Awards	2010	The Shilla Duty Free Asian Wave Award	Girls' Generation	Nominated	
Mnet Asian Music Awards	2010	Artist of the Year	Girls' Generation	Nominated	
Mnet Asian Music Awards	2011	Best Dance Performance – Female Group	Girls' Generation	Nominated	
Mnet Asian Music Awards	2011	Best Female Group	Girls' Generation	Won	
Mnet Asian Music Awards	2011	Artist of the Year	Girls' Generation	Won	
Mnet Asian Music Awards	2011	Song of the Year	"The Boys"	Nominated	
Mnet Asian Music Awards	2011	Album of the Year	The Boys	Nominated	
Mnet Asian Music Awards	2013	Best Female Group	Girls' Generation	Won	
Mnet Asian Music Awards	2013	Artist of the Year	Girls' Generation	Nominated	
Mnet Asian Music Awards	2013	Best Dance Performance – Female Group	Girls' Generation	Nominated	
Mnet Asian Music Awards	2013	Song of the Year	"I Got a Boy"	Nominated	
Mnet Asian Music Awards	2013	Album of the Year	I Got a Boy	Nominated	
Mnet Asian Music Awards	2014	Best Female Group	Girls' Generation	Nominated	
Mnet Asian Music Awards	2014	Artist of the Year	Girls' Generation	Nominated	
Mnet Asian Music Awards	2014	Album of the Year	Mr.Mr.	Nominated	
Mnet Asian Music Awards	2015	Best Female Group	Girls' Generation	Won	
Mnet Asian Music Awards	2015	Artist of the Year	Girls' Generation	Nominated	
Mnet Asian Music Awards	2017	Best Dance Performance – Female Group	"Holiday"	Nominated	
Mnet Asian Music Awards	2017	Qoo10 Song of the Year	"Holiday"	Nominated	
Mnet Asian Music Awards	2022	Worldwide Fan's Choice	Girls' Generation	Nominated	
MTV Asia Awards	2008	Favorite Artist Korea	Girls' Generation	Nominated	
MTV Video Music Awards Japan	2011	Best Group Video	"Genie"	Won	
MTV Video Music Awards Japan	2011	Video Of The Year	"Genie"	Nominated	
MTV Video Music Awards Japan	2011	Best Karaoke! Song	"Genie"	Won	
MTV Video Music Awards Japan	2012	Video of the Year	"Mr. Taxi"	Nominated	
MTV Video Music Awards Japan	2012	Album Of The Year	Girls' Generation	Won	
Myx Music Awards	2011	Favorite K-Pop Video	"Run Devil Run"	Nominated	
Myx Music Awards	2012	Favorite K-Pop Video	"The Boys"	Nominated	
Myx Music Awards	2014	Favorite K-Pop Video	"I Got a Boy"	Nominated	
Myx Music Awards	2015	Favorite K-Pop Video	"Mr.Mr."	Nominated	
Nickelodeon Korea Kids' Choice Awards	2009	Favorite Female Singer	Girls' Generation	Won	
Nickelodeon Korea Kids' Choice Awards	2010	Favorite Female Singer	Girls' Generation	Won	
Nickelodeon Korea Kids' Choice Awards	2011	Favorite Female Singer	Girls' Generation	Nominated	
Nickelodeon Korea Kids' Choice Awards	2012	Favorite Female Singer	Girls' Generation	Nominated	
Nickelodeon Korea Kids' Choice Awards	2013	Favorite Female Singer	Girls' Generation	Won	
Philippine K-pop Awards	2009	Music Video of the Year	"Gee"	Won	
Philippine K-pop Awards	2015	Best Female Group	Girls' Generation	Won	
Proud Korean Awards	2010	Art Category	Girls' Generation	Won	
Red Dot Design Award	2014	Communication Design Award Package	The Boys	Won	
Republic of Korea Entertainment Arts Awards	2010	Best Female Group	Girls' Generation	Won	
SBS MTV Best of the Best	2011	Best Girl Group	Girls' Generation	Won	
SBS MTV Best of the Best	2011	Best Female Music Video	Girls' Generation	Nominated	
SBS MTV Best of the Best	2011	Best Rival (Live)	Girls' Generation vs Wonder Girls	Nominated	
SBS MTV Best of the Best	2013	Artist of the Year	Girls' Generation	Nominated	
SBS MTV Best of the Best	2014	Artist of the Year	Girls' Generation	Nominated	
SBS MTV Best of the Best	2014	Best Female Group	Girls' Generation	Nominated	
SEED Awards	2012	The Most Popular Asian Artist	Girls' Generation	Won	
SEED Awards	2014	Famous Asian Artist	Girls' Generation	Won	
Seoul Music Awards	2008	Best Newcomer Award	Girls' Generation	Won	
Seoul Music Awards	2008	High1 Music Award	Girls' Generation	Won	
Seoul Music Awards	2010	Bonsang Award	Girls' Generation	Won	
Seoul Music Awards	2010	Daesang Award	Girls' Generation	Won	
Seoul Music Awards	2010	Popularity Award	Girls' Generation	Nominated	
Seoul Music Awards	2010	Digital Music Award	"Gee"	Won	
Seoul Music Awards	2011	Bonsang Award	Girls' Generation	Won	
Seoul Music Awards	2011	Daesang Award	Girls' Generation	Won	
Seoul Music Awards	2011	Popularity Award	Girls' Generation	Won	
Seoul Music Awards	2011	Hallyu Special Award	Girls' Generation	Won	
Seoul Music Awards	2012	Daesang Award	Girls' Generation	Nominated	
Seoul Music Awards	2012	Popularity Award	Girls' Generation	Won	
Seoul Music Awards	2012	Bonsang Award	Girls' Generation	Won	
Seoul Music Awards	2012	Hallyu Special Award	Girls' Generation	Nominated	
Seoul Music Awards	2014	Bonsang Award	Girls' Generation	Won	
Seoul Music Awards	2014	Popularity Award	Girls' Generation	Nominated	
Seoul Music Awards	2018	Bonsang Award	Girls' Generation	Nominated	
Seoul Music Awards	2018	Popularity Award	Girls' Generation	Nominated	
Seoul Music Awards	2018	Hallyu Special Award	Girls' Generation	Nominated	
Seoul Music Awards	2018	Fandom School Award	Girls' Generation	Nominated	
Seoul Music Awards	2023	Bonsang Award	Girls' Generation	Nominated	
Seoul Music Awards	2023	Popularity Award	Girls' Generation	Nominated	
Seoul Music Awards	2023	K-wave Award	Girls' Generation	Nominated	
Singapore E-Awards	2012	Most Popular Korean Artist	Girls' Generation	Nominated	
So-Loved Awards	2013	Best Female Dance	"I Got a Boy"	Won	
Soompi Awards	2018	Best Stage Outfit (Holiday)	Girls' Generation	Won	
Space Shower Music Video Awards	2011	Best Pop Music Video	"Genie"	Won	
Sports Korea Awards	2009	Star of the Year	Girls' Generation	Won	
Sports Korea Awards	2009	Singer of the Year	Girls' Generation	Won	
Sports Korea Awards	2009	Song of the Year	"Gee"	Won	
Sports Korea Awards	2010	Star of the Year	Girls' Generation	Won	
Sports Korea Awards	2010	Singer of the Year	Girls' Generation	Won	
Sports Korea Awards	2011	Star of the Year	Girls' Generation	Won	
Style Icon Asia (Note: Before 2016, Style Icon Asia was called the Style Icon Awards.)	2011	Style Icon	Girls' Generation	Won	
Style Icon Asia	2014	Style Icon	Girls' Generation	Won	
Style Icon Asia	2016	Style Icon	Girls' Generation	Won	
Style Icon Asia	2016	Asia Digital Star	Girls' Generation	Won	
Taiwan KKBOX Awards	2011	Album of the Year	Run Devil Run	Won	
Teen Choice Awards	2015	Choice International Artist	Girls' Generation	Nominated	
Teen Choice Awards	2016	Choice International Artist	Girls' Generation	Nominated	
World Music Awards	2012	World's Best Group	Girls' Generation	Nominated	
World Music Awards	2012	World's Best Live Act	Girls' Generation	Nominated	
World Music Awards	2014	World's Best Group	Girls' Generation	Nominated	
World Music Awards	2014	World's Best Live Act	Girls' Generation	Nominated	
World Music Awards	2014	World's Best Album	Mr.Mr.	Nominated	
YouTube Music Awards	2013	Video of the Year	"I Got a Boy"	Won	

== Other accolades ==
=== State honors ===
Name of country, year given, and name of honor
Country	Year	Honor	Ref.
South Korea (Note: Honors are given at the Korean Popular Culture and Arts Awards, arranged by the Korea Creative Content Agency and hosted by the Ministry of Culture, Sports and Tourism. They are awarded to those who have contributed to the arts and South Korea's pop culture.)	2011	Prime Minister's Commendation	

=== Listicles ===
Name of publisher, year listed, name of listicle, and placement
Publisher	Year	Listicle	Placement	Ref.
Billboard	2017	10 Best K-Pop Girl Groups of the Past Decade	1st	
The Dong-a Ilbo	2016	Best female artists according to experts	1st	
Forbes	2009	Korea Power Celebrity 40	5th	
Forbes	2010	Korea Power Celebrity 40	2nd	
Forbes	2011	Korea Power Celebrity 40	1st	
Forbes	2012	Korea Power Celebrity 40	1st	
Forbes	2013	Korea Power Celebrity 40	2nd	
Forbes	2014	Korea Power Celebrity 40	1st	
Forbes	2015	Korea Power Celebrity 40	9th	
Forbes	2016	Korea Power Celebrity 40	4th	
Forbes	2019	Korea Power Celebrity 40	27th	
Golden Disc Awards	2025	Golden Disc Powerhouse 40	Placed	
IZM	2025	The 25 Greatest Musicians of the first 25 Years of the 21st Century	Placed	
Teen Vogue	2024	21 Best Girl Groups of All Time	Placed	
Us Weekly	2022	Best Girl Groups of All Time	Placed	

== See also ==
- Girls' Generation discography
- Girls' Generation videography
- List of songs by Girls' Generation
- List of Girls' Generation concert tours
