= Holiday Night =

- Digital and Holiday version cover

Studio album by Girls' Generation
- Released: August 4, 2017
- Studio: SM Studio Center (Seoul)
- Genre: Pop
- Length: 37:01
- Language: Korean
- Labels: SM Entertainment; Dreamus
- Producer: Lee Soo-man (exec.)

Girls' Generation chronology
Lion Heart (2015)	Holiday Night (2017)	Forever 1 (2022)

Singles from Holiday Night
- 1. "Holiday" Released: August 4, 2017; 2. "All Night" Released: August 4, 2017

Holiday Night is the sixth Korean studio album and ninth overall by South Korean girl group Girls' Generation. It was released digitally on August 4 and physically on August 7, 2017, by SM Entertainment to commemorate the group's tenth anniversary since their debut in 2007. Lee Soo-man, founder of SM Entertainment, served as the album's executive producer.

The album is a primarily pop record containing ten tracks including the double singles "Holiday" and "All Night", which were released simultaneously with the digital release of the album. It peaked at number two on the Gaon Album Chart and has sold over 160,000 physical copies as of September 2017. The album also peaked atop the Billboard World Albums and the Taiwanese G-Music Chart and appeared on record charts of Australia, France, Japan, and New Zealand.

== Background and composition ==
Holiday Night consists of ten tracks in various genres. The first single "All Night" was written by Kenzie, who penned Girls' Generation's debut single "Into the New World", while the second single "Holiday" was co-written by member Seohyun, who also wrote the track "Sweet Talk". Another track "It's You", a tribute to a fan-letter received by the group, was written by member Yuri.

== Release and promotion ==
On July 4, 2017, Girls' Generation was announced to be releasing their sixth studio album in August 2017 to commemorate the group's tenth debut anniversary. On July 27, the album's title was revealed to be Holiday Night, ostensibly referring to its singles. The album and its singles' music videos were released online on August 4, while physical copies became available on August 7, 2017.

To celebrate their anniversary, Girls' Generation held a fanmeeting titled "Holiday to Remember" on August 5, 2017, at Olympic Hall, where they performed "Holiday", "All Night" and "One Last Time" for the first time. They performed the singles on South Korean music television shows on August 10, 12 and 13, 2017.

== Commercial performance ==
Holiday Night sold over 90,000 copies within one week after being released, surpassing The Boys as Girls' Generation's fastest-selling Korean-language album. It debuted atop the Billboard World Album chart, and peaked at number 2 on the South Korean Gaon Album Chart.

It was the 18th best-selling album of 2017 with 167,638 physical copies.

== Track listing ==
Holiday Night track listing
No.	Title	Lyrics	Music	Arrangement	Length
1.	"Girls Are Back"	Jo Yoon-kyung; Lim Jung-hyo	Deez; Anne Judith Stokke Wik; Christopher "Che" Jamal Pope; Rabih Jaber	Deez	3:26
2.	"All Night"	Kenzie	Ollipop; Daniel Caesar (Caesar & Loui); Ludwig Lindell (Caesar & Loui); Hayley Aitken	Ollipop; Caesar & Loui	3:43
3.	"Holiday"	Seohyun; JQ (Makeumine Works); Kim Hye-jung (Makeumine Works)	Lawrence Lee; Märta Grauers; Louise Frick Sveen	Lawrence Lee	3:20
4.	"Fan"	Kenzie	Kenzie	Kenzie	3:51
5.	"Only One"	January 8th (lalala Studio)	Andreas Öberg; Maria Marcus; Gustav Karlström	Maria Marcus	3:16
6.	"One Last Time"	Mafly (Joombas); Lee Hee-ju (lalala Studio)	Mike Woods (Rice n' Peas); Kevin White (Rice n' Peas); Andrew Bazzi; MZMC	Rice n' Peas	3:34
7.	"Sweet Talk"	Seohyun	Wassily Gradovsky; Carolyn Jordan; Alice Penrose	Mussashi	3:21
8.	"Love Is Bitter"	Hwang Hyun (MonoTree)	Hwang Hyun (MonoTree); Mayu Wakisaka	Hwang Hyun (MonoTree)	3:38
9.	"It's You" (오랜 소원)	Yuri	Kevin Charge (TG Publishing); Claire Rodrigues Lee (Hookline & Singer Music)	Kevin Charge (TG Publishing)	3:53
10.	"Light Up the Sky"	Kenzie	Kenzie; Erik Lidbom	Erik Lidbom	4:01
Total length:					36:03

== Credits and personnel ==
Credits are adapted from Holiday Night liner notes.

Studio

- SM Blue Ocean Studio – recording (track 1–3, 7–8), mixing (track 6, 8)
- SM Blue Cup Studio – recording (track 1, 4, 7, 9–10), mixing (track 7, 10)
- SM LVYIN Studio – recording (track 1, 5–9), mixing (track 5)
- Doobdoob Studio – recording, digital editing (track 1, 7, 10)
- Ingrid Studio – recording (track 2)
- SM Big Shot Studio – recording (track 4–10), digital editing (track 2–4), mixing (track 9)
- SM Yellow Tail Studio – recording (track 3), mixing (track 1, 3)
- MonoTree Studio – recording, digital editing (track 3, 5–6, 8–9)
- Prelude Studio – recording (track 4)
- Seoul Studio – recording (track 4, 8)
- The Vibe Studio – recording (track 8)
- SM Concert Hall Studio – mixing (track 2, 4)
- Sterling Sound – mastering (all tracks)

Personnel

- SM Entertainment – executive producer
- Lee Soo-man – producer
- Lee Sung-soo – production director
- Tak Young-jun – management director
- Kim Young-min – executive supervisor
- Yoo Young-jin – music and sound supervisor
- Girls' Generation – vocals (all tracks)
  - Yuri – lyrics (track 9)
  - Seohyun – lyrics (track 3, 7)
- Jo Yoon-kyung – lyrics (track 1)
- Lim Jung-hyo (track 1)
- Deez – producer, composition, arrangement (track 1)
- Anne Judith Stokke Wik – composition (track 1)
- Christopher "Che" Jamal Pope – composition (track 1)
- Rabih Jaber – composition (track 1)
- Kenzie – lyrics, vocal directing (track 2, 4, 10), producer, composition (track 4, 10), arrangement, piano (track 4)
- Ollipop – producer, composition, arrangement (track 2)
- Daniel Caesar (Caesar & Loui) – producer, composition, arrangement (track 2)
- Ludwig Lindell (Caesar & Loui) – producer, composition, arrangement (track 2)
- Hayley Aitken – composition, background vocals (track 2)
- Lawrence Lee – producer, composition, arrangement (track 3)
- Märta Grauers – composition (track 3)
- Louise Frick Sveen – composition, background vocals (track 3)
- January 8th (lalala Studio) – lyrics (track 5)
- Andreas Öberg – composition, guitar (track 5)
- Maria Marcus – producer, composition, arrangement, background vocals (track 5)
- Gustav Karlström – composition (track 5)
- Mafly (Joombas) – lyrics (track 6)
- Lee Hee-ju (lalala Studio) – lyrics (track 6)
- Mike Woods (Rice n' Peas) – producer, composition, arrangement (track 6)
- Kevin White (Rice n' Peas) – producer, composition, arrangement (track 6)
- Andrew Bazzi – composition (track 6)
- MZMC – composition (track 6)
- Wassily Gradovsky – composition (track 7)
- Carolyn Jordan – composition (track 7)
- Alice Penrose – composition, background vocals (track 7)
- Mussashi – producer, arrangement (track 7)
- Hwang Hyun – producer, lyrics, composition, arrangement, vocal directing, keyboards, strings conducting, strings arrangement, recording, Pro Tools operating, digital editing (track 8)
- Mayu Wakisaka – composition (track 8)
- Kevin Charge – producer, composition, arrangement (track 9)
- Claire Rodrigues-Lee – composition, background vocals (track 9)
- Erik Lidbom – producer, composition, arrangement (track 10)
- Kim Jin-hwan – vocal directing (track 1, 7)
- G-High – vocal directing, recording, Pro Tools operating, digital editing (track 3)
- Lee Joo-hyung – vocal directing, recording, digital editing (track 5–6), Pro Tools operating (track 5)
- Choo Dae-kwan a.k.a. DK Choo – vocal directing, recording, Pro Tools operating, digital editing (track 9)
- Shin Agnes – background vocals (track 1–4, 8–10)
- Choi Young-kyung – background vocals (track 5–6)
- Shaylen Carroll – background vocals (track 6)
- Park Seul-bi – background vocals (track 7)
- Choi Hoon – bass (track 4)
- Hong Jun-ho – guitar (track 4)
- Nile Lee – strings conducting, strings arrangement (track 4)
- On The String – strings (track 4, 8)
- Kim Eun-seok – drums (track 8)
- Kim Byung-seok a.k.a. Megatone (13) – bass (track 8)
- TST Horn Section – brass (track 8)
  - Kim Dong-ha – trumpet, brass conducting, brass arrangement (track 8)
  - Lee Han-jin – trombone (track 8)
  - Jung Hyo-seok – tenor saxophone (track 8)
- Kim Cheol-sun – recording (track 1–3, 7–8), mixing (track 6, 8)
- Jung Eui-seok – recording (track 1, 4, 7, 9–10), mixing (track 7, 10)
- Lee Ji-hong – recording (track 1, 5–9), mixing (track 5)
- Ahn Chang-kyu – recording (track 1, 7)
- Jang Woo-young – recording (track 10), digital editing (track 1, 7, 10)
- Min Sung-soo – recording assistant (track 1, 7)
- Jung Eun-kyung – recording (track 2)
- Woo Min-jeong – recording assistant (track 2)
- Lee Min-kyu – recording (track 4–10), digital editing (track 2–4), mixing (track 9)
- Koo Jong-pil – recording (track 3), mixing (track 1, 3)
- Lee Chang-sun – recording (track 4)
- Noh Sang-joon – recording assistant (track 4)
- Jeong Ki-hong – recording (track 4, 8)
- Choi Da-in – recording (track 4, 8)
- Ji Yong-joo – recording (track 4, 8)
- Kwak Jeong-shin – recording (track 8)
- Jeong Mo-yeon – recording (track 8)
- Nam Koong-jin – mixing (track 2, 4)
- Randy Merrill – mastering (all tracks)

== Charts ==
Chart (2017)	Peak position
Australian Digital Albums (ARIA)	30
French Digital Albums (SNEP)	58
Japan Hot Albums (Billboard Japan)	19
Japanese Albums (Oricon)	16
New Zealand Heatseeker Albums (RMNZ)	6
South Korean Albums (Gaon)	2
US Heatseekers Albums (Billboard)	5
US World Albums (Billboard)	1

== Sales ==
Country	Sales
South Korean (Gaon)	167,638

== Release history ==
Region	Date	Format	Label
Various	August 4, 2017	Digital download	SM, Genie
South Korea	August 7, 2017	CD	SM, Genie
