= SM Town Week =

2013 music festival in South Korea

SMTOWN WEEK
- Music festival tour by SM Town
- Start date: December 21, 2013
- End date: December 29, 2013
- Legs: 1
- No. of shows: 8

SM Town concert chronology
- SM Town Live World Tour III (2012–13); SMTOWN Week (2013); SM Town Live World Tour IV (2014–15)

SM Town Week (stylized as SMTOWN WEEK) was a winter music festival held from December 21 to 29, 2013 at the Korea International Exhibition Center in South Korea. The show features performances from various SM Entertainment artists.

== Performers ==
- TVXQ^{[A]}
- Super Junior^{[B]}
- Girls' Generation^{[C]}
- SHINee^{[D]}
- f(x)^{[E]}
- EXO^{[E]}
Notes

^{A} TVXQ's concert theme was Time Slip.
^{B} Super Junior's concert theme was Treasure Island.
^{C} Girls' Generation's concert theme was Märchen Fantasy
^{D} SHINee's concert theme was The Wizard.
^{E} f(x)'s and EXO's concert theme was Christmas Wonderland

== The Wizard ==
The Wizard was the first concert tour of SMTOWN Week headlined by South Korean boy group, SHINee. The concert was held on December 21, 2013.

=== Set list ===
1. "Hitchhiking"
2. "Nightmare"
3. "Dream Girl"
4. "Sherlock"
5. "Dang Dang Dang" (Jonghyun and Key cover)
6. "How Dare Do You Pour a Oil or Something" (Minho cover)
7. "Cry For Me" (Taemin cover)
8. "In Your Eyes" (Onew cover)
9. "Billie Jean" (Minho cover)
10. "Macarena" (Onew and Minho cover)
11. "Sleepless Night" (Acoustic version)
12. "Honesty"
13. "In My Room (Unplugged remix)
14. "Run With Me"
15. "Dazzling Girl"
16. "Get It + Get Down"
17. "Up & Down"
18. "Ready Or Not"
19. "Lucifer" (Remix)
20. "Beautiful" (Remix)
21. "X-Mas"
22. "Bodyguard"
23. "Magic Castle"
24. "Everybody"
25. "Green Rain"
26. "Colorful"
27. "Selene 6.23"

== Märchen Fantasy ==
Märchen Fantasy was the second concert tour of SMTOWN Week headlined by South Korean girl group, Girls' Generation. The concert was held on December 22, 2013.

=== Set list ===
1. "The Boys"
2. "Hoot"
3. "Express 999"
4. "Galaxy Supernova"
5. "Love & Girls"
6. "Romantic St."
7. "Love Melody"
8. "Over the Rainbow" (Taeyeon, Sunny, Tiffany, and Yuri cover)
9. "When You Wish Upon a Star" (Jessica, Hyoyeon, Sooyoung, Yoona and Seohyun cover)
10. "A Whole New World" (Tiffany with SHINee's Onew cover)
11. "Grown-Up Christmas List" (Taeyeon cover)
12. "Kiss Me" (Seohyun cover)
13. "Ma Boy" (Tiffany and Yuri cover)
14. "Bloom" (Sunny cover)
15. "24 Hours" (Sooyoung cover)
16. "Miss Korea" (Jessica cover)
17. "Honey"
18. "Kissing You" (Christmas remix)
19. "Gee" (Acapella version)
20. "Santa Baby"
21. "Diamond"
22. "All I Want for Christmas Is You" (Girls' Generation cover)
23. "Magic Castle"
24. "I Got a Boy"
25. "Snowy Wish"

=== Shows ===
Date	City	Country	Venue	Attendance
December 22, 2013	Ilsanseo-gu	South Korea	Korea International Exhibition Center	10,000

== Christmas Wonderland ==
f(x) and EXO, Christmas Wonderland (December 24-25, 2013)

Main Set
f(x) Opening VCR

1. "NU ABO"
2. "Airplane"
3. "LA chA TA"

EXO Opening VCR

4. "Let Out The Beast"
5. "Black Pearl"
6. "History"
7. "No More"
8. "Step"
9. "Jet"
10. "Peter Pan"
11. "3.6.5"
12. "Lucky"

EXO VCR

13. "Have Yourself a Merry Little Christmas" (Luna and Chen cover)
14. "First Snow"
15. "Christmas Day"

f(x) VCR

16. "Rockin' Around The X-Mas Tree" (f(x) cover)
17. "Baby Don't Cry"
18. "Thrift Shop" (Amber and Kris cover)
19. "Miracles in December
20. "Goodbye Summer"
21. "Candy" + "Happiness" (EXO cover)

SMTOWN VCR

22. "Pinocchio (Danger)"
23. "Electric Shock"
24. "Wolf"
25. "Mama"

Encore

26. "Rum Pum Pum Pum"
27. "Growl"
28. "Jingle Bell Rock" (f(x) and EXO cover)

== Time Slip ==
TVXQ, Time Slip (December 26-27, 2013)

Main Set
Opening VCR

1. "Maximum"
2. "I Don't Know"
3. "Here I Stand"
4. "Dream"

VCR

5. "Jesu, Joy of Man's Desiring" (TVXQ cover)
6. "Silent Night" (TVXQ cover)
7. "Sleigh Ride" (TVXQ cover)
8. "My Little Princess"
9. "I Believe"
10. "Always With You"
11. "Balloons"

VCR

12. "Keep Your Head Down"
13. "Rising Sun"
14. "Catch Me"

SMTOWN VCR

15. "Unforgettable"
16. "Always There..."
17. "How Are You?"
18. "Santa Revolution" (Sung by U-Know Yunho)
19. "Wild Horse" (Sung by Max Changmin)

VCR

20. "We are!"
21. "Ocean"
22. "Somebody To Love"
23. "Magic Castle"

Encore

24. "Hug"
25. "Thanks To"

== Treasure Island ==
Super Junior, Treasure Island (December 28-29, 2013)

Main Set
Opening VCR

1. "Blue World"
2. "Mr. Simple" (Prelude) + "Sexy, Free & Single"

SMTOWN VCR

3. "Bonamana"

VCR

4. "Reggae" (Siwon & Donghae duet)
5. "Confession" (Shindong & Eunhyuk cover)
6. "Close Ur Mouth" (Heechul cover)
7. "Guilty" (Ryeowook & Kyuhyun cover)
8. "…As I Told You" (Kangin solo)
9. "Had Enough Parties" (Sungmin cover)
10. "Apgujeong Nallari" (Zhou Mi & Henry cover)
11. "I Believe" (Super Junior cover)

VCR

12. "Miracle"
13. "Go" (Super Junior-M)
14. "Me" (Super Junior-M)
15. "A-Oh!" (Super Junior-M)
16. "Shake It Up" + "Oppa, Oppa" + "Rockstar"

VCR

17. "Still You" (Donghae & Eunhyuk duet)
18. "My Love By My Side" (Heechul & Kangin duet)
19. "Child That Walks Slowly" (Ryeowook cover)
20. "Doll" (Kyuhyun cover)
21. "Storm" (Day 1 Performance)
22. "My All is in You" (Day 1 Performance)
23. "Daydream" (Day 2 Performance)

VCR

24. "I Will Follow Him" (Super Junior cover)
25. "Full of Happiness"
26. "White Christmas"
27. "Magic Castle"

Encore

28. "Sorry, Sorry" (Day 1 Performance)
29. "First Snow"

== Shows ==
Date	City	Country	Venue	Attendance
December 21, 2013	Ilsanseo-gu	South Korea	Korea International Exhibition Center	80,000
December 22, 2013	Ilsanseo-gu	South Korea	Korea International Exhibition Center	80,000
December 24, 2013	Ilsanseo-gu	South Korea	Korea International Exhibition Center	80,000
December 25, 2013	Ilsanseo-gu	South Korea	Korea International Exhibition Center	80,000
December 26, 2013	Ilsanseo-gu	South Korea	Korea International Exhibition Center	80,000
December 27, 2013	Ilsanseo-gu	South Korea	Korea International Exhibition Center	80,000
December 28, 2013	Ilsanseo-gu	South Korea	Korea International Exhibition Center	80,000
December 29, 2013	Ilsanseo-gu	South Korea	Korea International Exhibition Center	80,000
