= All Night (Girls' Generation song) =

Single by Girls' Generation

from the album Holiday Night
- Released: August 4, 2017
- Studio: Ingrid Studio; SM Blue Ocean Studio
- Genre: Bubblegum pop; nu-disco
- Length: 3:42
- Label: S.M. Entertainment
- Composer(s): Ollipop; Ludwig Lindell; Hayley Aitken; Daniel Caesar
- Lyricist(s): Kenzie

Girls' Generation singles chronology
"Sailing (0805)" (2016)	"All Night" (2017)	"Holiday" (2017)

Music video
- "All Night (Documentary Version)" on YouTube "All Night (Clean Version)" on YouTube

"All Night" is a song recorded by South Korean girl group Girls' Generation for their sixth studio album Holiday Night (2017). The song was released digitally on August 4, 2017, as the album's single alongside "Holiday" by S.M. Entertainment.

== Composition ==
According to Billboard's Tamar Herman, "All Night" is a nu-disco tune in the style of a bubblegum pop song that features a 1980s vibe with "thumping" bass and "twinky electronic" melody. Jacques Peterson from Idolator described the track as "funky nu-disco" that turns "a teenage slumber party into Studio 54." Lyrically, the song is a dedication to Girls' Generation's longevity and bond with their supporters which, according to Herman, is "atypical" for K-pop girl groups.

== Chart performance ==
"All Night" debuted at number 35 on the Gaon Digital Chart, on the chart issue dated July 30 – August 5, 2017, with 47,802 downloads sold.

== Music videos ==
A documentary-style music video for the song was released on August 4, 2017, featuring in between mini-interviews of the eight members reflecting upon their career, interspersed with scenes of the girls having fun and dancing in a disco club. The video ends with clips from the early days of the group, which offers up "a quick trip down memory lane of what is now one of K-pop's most legendary acts", according to Billboard's Tamar Herman. A "clean version" music video excluding mini-interviews was released the following day and features only the disco scenes.

== Reception ==
Idolator's Jacques Peterson wrote, "Even if you don't listen to K-Pop, these tracks ["All Night" and "Holiday"] are absolute must-haves for any pop playlist this summer."

The song made Billboard's "20 Best K-pop Songs of 2017" list at number 14, described as a slick single appropriate for vogue-off as it is for a K-pop concert.

== Charts ==
Chart (2017)	Peak position
South Korea (Gaon)	32
US World Digital Songs (Billboard)	5
K-pop Hot 100 (Billboard Korea)	79

== Credits and personnel ==
Credits are adapted from Holiday Night liner notes.

Studio

- SM Blue Ocean Studio – recording
- Ingrid Studio – recording
- SM Big Shot Studio – digital editing
- SM Concert Hall Studio – mixing
- Sterling Sound – mastering

Personnel

- SM Entertainment – executive producer
- Lee Soo-man – producer
- Kim Young-min – executive supervisor
- Yoo Young-jin – music and sound supervisor
- Girls' Generation – vocals
- Kenzie – lyrics, vocal directing
- Hayley Aitken – composition, background vocals
- Ollipop – composition, arrangement
- Daniel Caesar – composition, arrangement
- Ludwig Lindell – composition, arrangement
- Shin Agnes – background vocals
- Kim Cheol-sun – recording
- Jung Eun-kyung – recording
- Woo Min-jeong – recording assistant
- Lee Min-kyu – digital editing
- Nam Koong-jin – mixing
- Randy Merrill – mastering
