= Hello Baby (TV series) =

South Korean reality show

- Genre: Variety, Reality
- Created by: KBS N
- Country of origin: South Korea
- Original language: Korean
- No. of seasons: 7
- No. of episodes: 95

Production
- Production location: South Korea
- Camera setup: Multi-camera
- Running time: approx. 50 minutes
- Production companies: KBS N; De Chocolate E&TF (season 1); Stasia (seasons 1 and 2); Prime Media (season 3); Good Face Company (seasons 4 to 7)

Original release
- Network: KBS Joy
- Release: June 23, 2009 – June 4, 2013

Related
- We Got Married; Family Outing

Hello Baby (Korean: 헬로 베이비) is a South Korean reality show where celebrities experience parenthood by raising children ages 5 and under. The main purpose is to see whether or not the celebrities make "good" parents.

The show aired for seven seasons, and has featured the groups Girls' Generation, SHINee, T-ara, Sistar, MBLAQ, B1A4 and Boyfriend. The first season, featuring Girls' Generation ran for 22 episodes, the seasons that followed all have 12 episodes each. It aired every Tuesday on KBS Joy.

== Format ==
Each season, an idol group is given an infant or toddler to take care of, allowing them to experience parenthood to an extent. In the first season, Girls' Generation became 'mothers' to a nine-month-old boy. This was also the case for the boy band, Shinee, in the second season, though the child is two years old. In the third season, the girl group T-ara had to take care of three toddlers.

During the show's first three seasons, each group had to take care of the babies on their own, with some male celebrities acting as guest 'dads' in the first season. In the fourth season, Sistar became mothers to a baby boy, with Super Junior's Leeteuk as the father.

While all of the show's seasons have different concepts, they are still similar in ways such as the 'parents' being given missions and activities to do for the day with the children.

== Seasons ==
=== Season 1: Girls' Generation's Hello Baby ===
Hello Baby's first season premiered on June 23, 2009. With 9 members, Girls' Generation became mothers to a nine-month-old boy named Cho Kyungsan. In the first episode, the members are given pointers about child care before they meet the baby. Each episode, guest fathers come on the show to help. At the end of the day, the dads pick 'best mom' who is given certain privileges and a 'worst mom' who is given some punishment, usually clean-up duties. They also occasionally play games and other activities. Girls' Generation's season was well-received, and its 5th episode ranked first among cable channels in its time slot. The show won 'Best Picture for Variety' at the 4th Korean Cable TV Awards in 2009. It ended with a total of 22 episodes on November 17, 2009.

Episodes

Episode	Broadcast Date	Guest Dad	Best Mom	Worst Mom
1	June 23, 2009	MC Mong	Sunny	Tiffany
2	June 30, 2009	MC Mong	Sunny	Tiffany
3	July 7, 2009	—N/a	Sunny	Jessica
4	July 14, 2009	—N/a	Sunny	Jessica
5	July 21, 2009	Eun Ji-won	Yuri	Tiffany
6	July 28, 2009	Eun Ji-won	Yuri	Tiffany
7	August 4, 2009	Lee Min-woo	Sooyoung	Yuri
8	August 11, 2009	Lee Min-woo; Shin Jung-hwan (guest)	Sooyoung	Yuri
9	August 18, 2009	—N/a	—N/a	—N/a
10	August 25, 2009	Lee Hyuk-jae	Tiffany	Yuri
11	September 1, 2009	Lee Hyuk-jae	Tiffany	Yuri
12	September 8, 2009	—N/a	—N/a	—N/a
13	September 15, 2009	Han Min-kwan; Il Chool	Hyoyeon	Yuri
14	September 22, 2009	—N/a	—N/a	—N/a
15	September 29, 2009	—N/a	—N/a	—N/a
16	October 6, 2009	—N/a	—N/a	—N/a
17	October 13, 2009	Park Hyun-bin	Yoona	Tiffany
18	October 20, 2009	Moon Hee-jun	Hyoyeon; Sooyoung; Yoona; Seohyun	—N/a
19	October 27, 2009	Moon Hee-jun	Hyoyeon; Sooyoung; Yoona; Seohyun	—N/a
20	November 3, 2009	—N/a	—N/a	—N/a
21	November 10, 2009	Gil	—N/a	—N/a
22	November 17, 2009	Gil	—N/a	—N/a

=== Season 2: Shinee's Hello Baby ===
The second season started on January 19, 2010, and it features the boy band, SHINee, who have to take care of a 2-year-old toddler named Jung Yoo-geun. Like its previous season, the members have to deal with daily problems with having a child, such as preparing his meals, calming him down when he cries and doing other activities such as playing with him or teaching him new words. Because the members are not always with the child, they frequently sent him videos when they are away. In the final episode, Yoo-geun is given a time capsule by his 'fathers' which he would open when he turns 21. The season ended on April 6, 2010, with 12 episodes and a special episode.

Episodes

Episode	Broadcast Date	Guests
1	January 19, 2010	
2	January 26, 2010	K.Will, T-ara, IU
3	February 2, 2010	
4	February 9, 2010	
5	February 16, 2010	Girls' Generation (minus Yoona and Tiffany) Kim Jongmin, Super Junior's Eunhyuk and Leeteuk, Kang Hodong
6	February 23, 2010	
7	March 2, 2010	
8	March 9, 2010	
9	March 16, 2010	
10	March 23, 2010	
11	March 30, 2010	
12	April 6, 2010	
13	April 12, 2010	

=== Season 3: T-ara's Hello Baby ===
The third season, featuring girl group T-ara, started on November 16, 2010. For several months, the group act as mothers to three young brothers named Moon Mason, Moon Mavin and Moon Maden.

=== Season 4: Sistar and Leeteuk's Hello Baby ===
The fourth season started on September 2, 2011. It portrays the four Sistar members (Hyolyn, Bora, Soyou and Dasom) acting as mothers and Super Junior's Leeteuk as a father taking care of a baby named Kim Kyumin (김규민). The season finished broadcasting on November 18, 2011.

This season is similar to that of Leeteuk's Find Mom project. It shows the process of finding the favorite mom amongst the four Sistar members. Unlike the past seasons, it was the baby who was leading the shows, not the parents.

=== Season 5: MBLAQ's Hello Baby ===
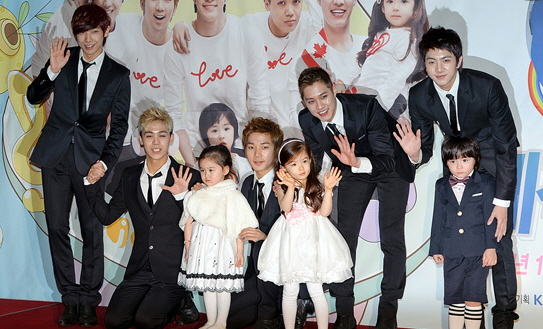
MBLAQ at the press conference for Hello Baby, on January 18, 2012

The fifth season stars boy band MBLAQ as fathers of three multi-cultural children: Dayoung (Vietnamese-Korean), Lauren (Korean-Canadian) and Leo (French-Korean). The season began airing on January 19, 2012, and ended on April 5, 2012, with a total of 12 episodes. Like other seasons of Hello Baby, MBLAQ had to fulfill the task as parents to meet the needs of their kids.

=== Season 6: B1A4's Hello Baby ===
The sixth season features boy band B1A4 as fathers to a couple of countryside kids, Eunsol and Hyunwoo. The concept of this season is getting to know Seoul, since all the members of the band came from the countryside as well.

This season not only follows the established format of the care and growth of the children, but also unveils the members' journey into Seoul, since none of the members are from Seoul, as well as the children, who are not from Seoul either.

=== Season 7: Boyfriend's Hello Baby ===
The seventh season, starring Boyfriend, started on January 4, 2013. In this season, Boyfriend are fathers to two young toddlers.
