= Holiday (Girls' Generation song) =

Single by Girls' Generation

from the album Holiday Night
- Released: August 4, 2017
- Studio: SM Blue Ocean Studio; MonoTree Studio
- Genre: Bubblegum pop
- Length: 3:19
- Label: SM Entertainment
- Composer(s): Lawrence Lee; Marta Grauers; Louise Frick Sveen
- Lyricist(s): Seohyun; JQ; Kim Hye-jung

Girls' Generation singles chronology
"All Night" (2017)	"Holiday" (2017)	"Forever 1" (2022)

Music video
- "Holiday" on YouTube

"Holiday" is a song recorded by South Korean girl group Girls' Generation for their sixth studio album Holiday Night (2017). The song was released digitally on August 4, 2017, as the album's single alongside "All Night" by SM Entertainment.

== Composition ==
According to Billboard's Tamar Herman, "Holiday" is a bubblegum pop song that features "bright" funk elements and synthesizers in its composition. Jacques Peterson from Idolator also noted the "retro-meets-modern flavor" of the track. Lyrically, the song is a dedication to Girls' Generation's longevity and bond with their supporters which, according to Herman, is "atypical" for K-pop girl groups. "I'm feeling good, I've been waiting for this day/ We meet again like that first time we met [...] Today is our holiday/ A wonderful day came that we've been waiting for a long time."

== Chart performance ==
"Holiday" debuted at number 19 on the Gaon Digital Chart, on the chart issue dated July 30 - August 5, 2017, with 70,125 downloads sold.

== Reception ==
Tamar Herman from Billboard labelled the song "timelessly peppy" and praised the "earworm-style chorus" of the song that are of Girls' Generation's signature styles. She further lauded the group's "diverse vocal colors" expressed via the "high notes and ad-libs" that enabled each of the member to shine. Idolator's Jacques Peterson wrote, "Even if you don’t listen to K-Pop, these tracks ["All Night" and "Holiday"] are absolute must-haves for any pop playlist this summer."

== Charts ==
Chart (2017)	Peak position
Japan Hot 100 (Billboard)	32
Philippine Hot 100 (Billboard)	38
South Korea (Gaon)	12
US World Digital Songs (Billboard)	6
K-pop Hot 100 (Billboard Korea)	16

== Credits and personnel ==
Credits are adapted from Holiday Night liner notes.

Studio

- SM Blue Ocean Studio – recording
- MonoTree Studio – recording, digital editing
- SM Yellow Tail Studio – recording, mixing
- SM Big Shot Studio – digital editing
- Sterling Sound – mastering

Personnel

- SM Entertainment – executive producer
- Lee Soo-man – producer
- Kim Young-min – executive supervisor
- Yoo Young-jin – music and sound supervisor
- Girls' Generation – vocals
  - Seohyun – lyrics
- JQ – lyrics
- Kim Hee-jung – lyrics
- Louise Frick Sveen – composition, background vocals
- Lawrence Lee – composition, arrangement
- Marta Grauers – composition
- G-High – vocal directing, recording, digital editing, Pro Tools operating
- Shin Agnes – background vocals
- Koo Jong-pil – recording, mixing
- Kim Cheol-sun – recording
- Lee Min-kyu – digital editing
- Randy Merrill – mastering
