= Onew discography =

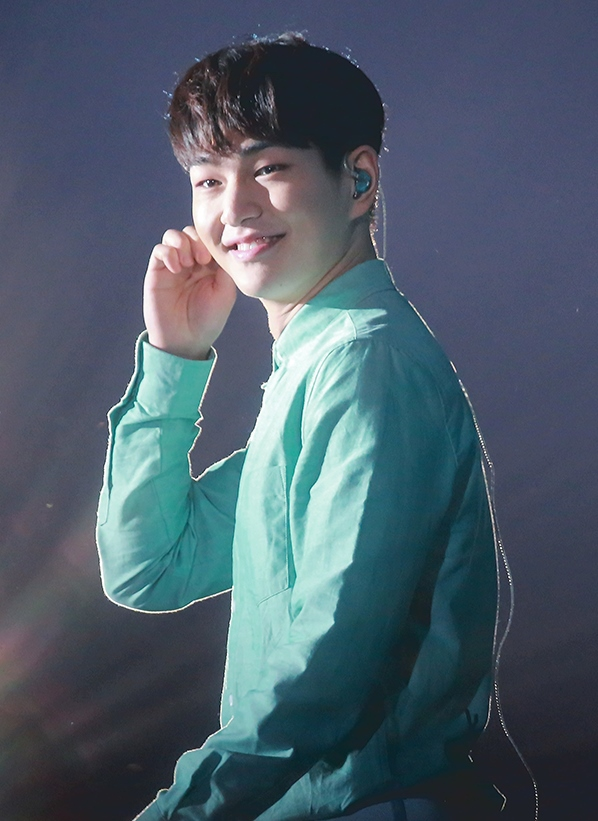
- Onew at the SM Town Live World Tour IV in 2015
- Studio albums: 3
- EPs: 7
- Soundtrack albums: 1
- Singles: 29
- Video albums: 1
- Music videos: 35
- Single albums: 2
- Soundtrack appearances: 12

South Korean singer Onew has released three studio albums, seven extended plays, one soundtrack album, two single album, twenty-nine singles (including three as a featured artist) and twelve soundtrack songs. Onew began his music career in 2008 as a member of the boy band Shinee. Early on in his career, he released multiple collaboration singles and soundtracks of various television shows.

Under SM Entertainment, Onew debuted as a soloist in 2018 with the release of his extended play, Voice, which peaked at number two on the Circle Album Chart. He released his second extended play, Dice in 2022, and his first Korean studio album, Circle in 2023, both of which peaked at number three on the Circle Album Chart. After joining Griffin Entertainment to handle his solo activities, he released his third extended play, Flow, in 2024, and his fourth extended play, Connection, in 2025, peaking at number five and three on the Circle Album Chart respectively. Later in 2025, he released his second Korean studio album, Percent, which peaked at number four on the Circle Album Chart. In 2026, he released his fifth extended play, Tough Love, which peaked at number three on the Circle Album Chart. Later in 2026, he released his first Korean single album Illusion, which peaked at number fourteen on the Circle Album Chart.

Onew debuted in Japan in 2022. He released his first Japanese-language extended play, Who Sings? Vol.1 which formed a part of his debut studio album, Life Goes On. The album peaked at number two on the Oricon Albums Chart. In 2025, he released his second extended play, Saku, which peaked at number five on the Oricon Album Chart. In 2026, he released his first Japanese single album Kakera -Unmei no Piece-, which peaked at number six on the Oricon Album Chart.

== Albums ==
=== Studio albums ===
List of studio albums, with selected chart positions and sales
Title	Album details	Peak chart positions				Sales
Title	Album details	KOR	JPN	JPN Hot	UK Dig.	Sales
Life Goes On	Released: July 6, 2022 (JPN); Label: EMI Records, Universal Music Japan; Formats: CD, digital download, streaming	—	2	4	—	JPN: 38,585 (Phy.); JPN: 2,718 (Dig.)
Circle	Released: March 6, 2023 (KOR); Label: SM Entertainment; Formats: CD, digital download, streaming, SMC	3	11	10	98	KOR: 137,308; JPN: 6,605 (Phy.); JPN: 2,172 (Dig.)
Percent	Released: July 15, 2025 (KOR); Label: Griffin Entertainment; Formats: CD, digital download, streaming, SMC	4	—	—	—	KOR: 113,564; JPN: 673 (Dig.)
"—" denotes releases that did not chart or were not released in that region.

=== Soundtrack albums ===
Title	Album details	Peak chart position	Sales
Title	Album details	KOR	Sales
Midnight Sun OST (Onew ver.)	Released: August 25, 2021; Label: Universal Music; Formats: CD, digital download	23	KOR: 4,874

== Extended plays ==
List of extended plays, showing selected details, selected chart positions and sales figures
Title	EP details	Peak chart positions						Sales
Title	EP details	KOR	FRA Dig.	JPN	JPN Hot	UK Dig.	US World	Sales
Voice	Released: December 5, 2018 (KOR); Label: SM Entertainment; Formats: CD, digital download, streaming	2	125	24	9	—	8	KOR: 71,501; JPN: 10,237
Dice	Released: April 11, 2022 (KOR); Label: SM Entertainment; Formats: CD, digital download, streaming	3	—	15	8	44	—	KOR: 141,112; JPN: 8,173
Who Sings? Vol.1	Released: June 1, 2022 (JPN); Label: EMI Records, Universal Music Japan; Formats: Digital download, streaming	—	—	—	4	—	—	JPN: 5,099 (Dig.)
Flow	Released: September 3, 2024 (KOR); Label: Griffin Entertainment; Formats: CD, digital download, streaming, SMC	5	—	10	16	—	—	KOR: 155,193; JPN: 8,921 (Phy.); JPN: 1,097 (Dig.)
Connection	Released: January 6, 2025 (KOR); Label: Griffin Entertainment; Formats: CD, digital download, streaming, SMC	3	—	7	—	—	—	KOR: 117,206; JPN: 13,208 (Phy.); JPN: 787 (Dig.)
Saku	Released: October 1, 2025 (JPN); Label: Victor Entertainment; Formats: CD, digital download, streaming	—	—	5	45	—	—	JPN: 13,912 (Phy.); JPN: 1,026 (Dig.)
Tough Love	Released: March 9, 2026 (KOR); Label: Griffin Entertainment; Formats: CD, digital download, streaming, SMC	3	—	—	—	—	—	KOR: 112,980; JPN: 589 (Dig.)
"—" denotes releases that did not chart or were not released in that region.

== Single albums ==
List of single albums, showing selected details, selected chart positions and sales figures
Title	Details	Peak chart positions			Sales
Title	Details	KOR	JPN	JPN Hot	Sales
Kakera -Unmei no Piece- (Kakera -運命のピース-)	Released: September 16, 2026 (JPN); Label: Victor Entertainment; Formats: CD, digital download, streaming	—	6	25	JPN: 17,948 (Phy.)
Illusion (착각)	Released: October 20, 2026 (KOR); Label: Griffin Entertainment; Formats: digital download, streaming, SMC	14	—	—	KOR: 30,089

== Singles ==
=== As lead artist ===
List of singles as lead artist, with selected chart positions and sales, showing album name and year released
Title	Year	Peak chart positions		Sales	Album
Title	Year	KOR	JPN Dig.	Sales	Album
"Starry Night" (with Lee Jin-ah)	2016	47	—	KOR: 65,044	SM Station Season 1
"Lullaby" (수면제) (with Roco of Rocoberry)	2017	60	—	KOR: 30,186	SM Station Season 2
"Blue"	2018	— (Note: "Blue" did not enter the Gaon Digital Chart, but peaked at number 13 on the component Download chart.)	—	—N/a	Voice
"Way" (별 하나) (with Punch)	2021	127	—	—N/a	SM Station Season 4
"Dice"	2022	16	—	—N/a	Dice
"Kirakira" (キラキラ)	2022	—	—	—N/a	Life Goes On
"Uroko" (鱗(うろこ))	2022	—	—	—N/a	Life Goes On
"Life Goes On"	2022	—	—	—N/a	Life Goes On
"Dance Whole Day"	2022	—	17	JPN: 3,266	Non-album single
"O (Circle)"	2023	7	—	—N/a	Circle
"Inspiration"	2023	—	33	JPN: 1,618	Non-album singles
"Knock On My Door"	2023	—	36	JPN: 1,495	Non-album singles
"December 32 days"	2024	— (Note: "December 32 days" did not enter the Circle Digital Chart, but peaked at number 42 on the component Download chart.)	—	—N/a	Non-album singles
"All Day" (월화수목금토일)	2024	— (Note: "All Day" did not enter the Circle Digital Chart, but peaked at number 31 on the component Download chart.)	—	—N/a	Flow
"Beat Drum" (매력)	2024	2	—	—N/a	Flow
"Yay" (만세)	2024	— (Note: "Yay" did not enter the Circle Digital Chart, but peaked at number 55 on the component Download chart.)	—	—N/a	Connection
"Winner"	2025	11	—	—N/a	Connection
"Mad"	2025	— (Note: "Mad" did not enter the Circle Digital Chart, but peaked at number 57 on the component Download chart.)	—	—N/a	Percent
"Confidence"	2025	— (Note: "Confidence" did not enter the Circle Digital Chart, but peaked at number 49 on the component Download chart.)	—	—N/a	Percent
"Animals"	2025	13	—	—N/a	Percent
"Hana no Yoni" (花のように)	2025	—	—	—N/a	Saku
"Tough Love"	2026	5	—	—N/a	Tough Love
"Kakera -Unmei no Piece-" (Kakera -運命のピース-)	2026	—	—	—N/a	Kakera -Unmei no Piece- (Kakera -運命のピース-)
"Mind Games" (with Yuju)	2026	— (Note: "Mind Games" did not enter the Circle Digital Chart, but peaked at number 54 on the component Download chart.)	—	—N/a	Illusion (착각)
"Tic Tac Toe" (with Zico)	2026	1	—	—N/a	Illusion (착각)
"Illusion" (착각)	2026	— (Note: "Illusion" did not enter the Circle Digital Chart, but peaked at number 9 on the component Download chart.)	—	—N/a	Illusion (착각)
"—" denotes releases that did not chart or were not released in that region.

=== As featured artist ===
List of singles as featured artist, with selected chart positions, showing album name and year released
Title	Year	Peak chart positions	Album
Title	Year	KOR (Note: The Circle Chart, previously known as the Gaon Music Chart, was established in 2010.)	Album
"Vanilla Love" (Lee Hyun-ji featuring Onew)	2008	—N/a	Kiss Me
"Vanilla Love Part 2" (Lee Hyun-ji featuring Onew)	2009	—N/a	Non-album single
"Play the Field" (어장관리) (Kim Yeon-woo featuring Onew, Yoo In-na)	2018	—	Forever Yours
"—" denotes releases that did not chart or were not released in that region.

== Soundtrack appearances ==
List of soundtrack appearances, with selected chart positions and sales, showing album name and year released
Title	Year	Peak chart positions	Sales	Album
Title	Year	KOR	Sales	Album
"In Your Eyes"	2012	60	KOR: 82,605	To the Beautiful You OST
"Moonlight"	2014	54	KOR: 53,095	Miss Korea OST
"Shadow"	2021	— (Note: "Shadow" did not enter the Gaon Digital Chart, but peaked at number 86 on the component Download chart.)	—N/a	Breakup Probation: One Week OST
"Good-Bye Days" (with Kei)	2021	— (Note: "Goodbye Days" did not enter the Gaon Digital Chart, but peaked at number 117 on the component Download chart.)	—N/a	Midnight Sun 2021 OST
"Meet Me When the Sun Goes Down"	2021	—	—N/a	Midnight Sun 2021 OST
"Dear My Spring"	2021	— (Note: "Dear My Spring" did not enter the Gaon Digital Chart, but peaked at number 38 on the component Download Chart.)	—N/a	You Are My Spring OST
"Blue" (with Elaine)	2021	— (Note: "Blue" did not enter the Gaon Digital Chart, but peaked at number 83 on the component Download chart.)	—N/a	High Class OST
"Mind Warning" (마음주의보)	2022	— (Note: "Mind Warning" did not enter the Gaon Digital Chart, but peaked at number 20 on the component Download chart.)	—N/a	Forecasting Love and Weather OST
"The Sun is in My Eyes"	2022	—	—N/a	Midnight Sun 2022 OST
"Melody Called You" (with Kim Nam-joo)	2022	—	—N/a	Midnight Sun 2022 OST
"For You" (아름다운 너에게)	2024	— (Note: "For You" did not enter the Circle Digital Chart, but peaked at number 64 on the component Download chart.)	—N/a	No Office Romance! OST
"Into You"	2026	— (Note: "Into You" did not enter the Circle Digital Chart, but peaked at number 70 on the component Download chart.)	—N/a	My Royal Nemesis OST
"—" denotes releases that did not chart or were not released in that region.

== Other appearances ==
List of appearances, with selected chart positions, showing album name and year released
Title	Year	Peak chart positions	Album
Title	Year	KOR	Album
"One Year Later" (with Jessica)	2009	—N/a	Genie
"Hope from Kwangya" (as part of SM Town)	2021	—	2021 Winter SM Town: SMCU Express
"Ordinary Day" (with Kyuhyun and Taeil)	2021	— (Note: "Ordinary Day" did not enter the Gaon Digital Chart, but peaked at number 69 on the component Download chart.)	2021 Winter SM Town: SMCU Express
"The Cure" (with Kangta, BoA, U-Know, Leeteuk, Taeyeon, Suho, Irene, Taeyong, Mark, Kun, and Karina)	2022	— (Note: "The Cure" did not enter the Circle Digital Chart, but peaked at number 39 on the component Download chart.)	2022 Winter SM Town: SMCU Palace
"Where You Are" (넌 어디에) (with Ryeowook, Doyoung, Chenle, and Xiaojun)	2022	— (Note: "Where You Are" did not enter the Circle Digital Chart, but peaked at number 87 on the component Download chart.)	2022 Winter SM Town: SMCU Palace
"—" denotes releases that did not chart or were not released in that region.

== Songwriting credits ==
All songwriting credits are adapted from the Korea Music Copyright Association's database and liner notes unless otherwise noted.

List of songs, showing year released, artist name, and name of the album
Song	Year	Artist	Album	Lyrics		Music		Arrangement	
Song	Year	Artist	Album	Credited	With	Credited	With	Credited	With
"Your Name"	2010	Shinee	Lucifer	Yes	Choi Min-ho	No	—N/a	No	—N/a
"Shout Out" (악)	2010	Shinee	Lucifer	Yes	JQ (Makeumine Works), Shinee, Misfit	No	—N/a	No	—N/a
"So Amazing"	2016	Shinee	1 of 1	Yes	—N/a	No	—N/a	No	—N/a
"Beautiful Life" (한마디)	2016	Shinee	1 and 1	Yes	—N/a	No	—N/a	No	—N/a
"Play the Field" (어장관리)	2018	Kim Yeon-woo (featuring Onew, Yoo In-na)	Forever Yours	Yes	Postino	No	—N/a	No	—N/a
"Our Page" (네가 남겨둔 말)	2018	Shinee	The Story of Light	Yes	Shinee, Kenzie	No	—N/a	No	—N/a
"Sunny Side"	2018	Shinee	Non-album single	Yes	Shinee	No	—N/a	No	—N/a
"Illusion" (사랑이었을까)	2018	Onew	Voice	Yes	Roco	No	—N/a	No	—N/a
"Shine on You" (온유하게 해요)	2018	Onew	Voice	Yes	—N/a	No	—N/a	No	—N/a
"Way" (별 하나)	2021	Onew (with Punch)	SM Station Season 4	Yes	Kim Eana	No	—N/a	No	—N/a
"In the Whale"	2022	Onew	Dice	Yes	Seo Ji-eum	No	—N/a	No	—N/a
"All Day" (월화수목금토일)	2024	Onew	Flow	Yes	Jeon Ji-eun, Zenon	No	—N/a	No	—N/a
"Beat Drum" (매력)	2024	Onew	Flow	Yes	Park Rang	No	—N/a	No	—N/a
"Hola!"	2024	Onew	Flow	Yes	Kim Eana	No	—N/a	No	—N/a
"Maestro" (마에스트로)	2024	Onew	Flow	Yes	Seo Jeong-a	No	—N/a	No	—N/a
"Shape of My Heart"	2024	Onew	Flow	Yes	Jeon Ji-eun	No	—N/a	No	—N/a
"Focus"	2024	Onew	Flow	Yes	Jo Yoon-kyung	No	—N/a	No	—N/a
"Yay" (만세)	2024	Onew	Connection	Yes	Lee Seu-ran	No	—N/a	No	—N/a
"Winner"	2025	Onew	Connection	Yes	Seo Ji-eum	No	—N/a	No	—N/a
"Promise You"	2025	Onew	Connection	Yes	Hyun Ji-won	No	—N/a	No	—N/a
"Boy" (소년)	2025	Onew	Connection	Yes	Hyun Ji-won	No	—N/a	No	—N/a
"Gradation" (번져)	2025	Onew	Connection	Yes	Danke	No	—N/a	No	—N/a
"Conversation"	2025	Onew	Connection	Yes	Shin Sa-kang	No	—N/a	No	—N/a
"Mad"	2025	Onew	Percent	Yes	Ori Rose	Yes	Ditch David, Ori Rose, Hautboi Rich	No	—N/a
"Silky"	2025	Onew	Percent	Yes	Na Yun-jeong	No	—N/a	No	—N/a
"Caffeine"	2025	Onew	Percent	Yes	Choi Ji-yun	No	—N/a	No	—N/a
"Marshmallow"	2025	Onew	Percent	Yes	Kang Eun-jeong	No	—N/a	No	—N/a
"Animals"	2025	Onew	Percent	Yes	Ize	No	—N/a	Yes	Jake K, Gingerbread, Ditch David
"Percent (%)"	2025	Onew	Percent	Yes	Bang Hye-hyun	No	—N/a	No	—N/a
"Happy Birthday"	2025	Onew	Percent	Yes	Park Rang	No	—N/a	No	—N/a
"Dot Dot Dot (...)"	2026	Onew	Tough Love	Yes	Lee Aeng-du	No	—N/a	No	—N/a
"Tough Love"	2026	Onew	Tough Love	Yes	Lee Seu-ran, Ryan Bickley	Yes	Ditch David, Ryan Bickley, Freedo	No	—N/a
"Flex on Me"	2026	Onew	Tough Love	Yes	Ditch David, Chris Wahle, Jack Samson, Hautboi Rich	No	—N/a	No	—N/a
"Lie"	2026	Onew	Tough Love	Yes	RGB, Ha Shin-young	Yes	Ditch David, Shakka, Bhav	No	—N/a
"X, Oh Why?"	2026	Onew	Tough Love	Yes	Min Yeon-jae, 3!	No	—N/a	No	—N/a
"Mind Games"	2026	Onew (with Yuju)	Illusion (착각)	Yes	Jiggy	No	—N/a	No	—N/a
"Tic Tac Toe"	2026	Onew (with Zico)	Illusion (착각)	Yes	Zico, Liljune	Yes	Ditch David, Zico, Wiljam, Jack Samson, Hautboi Rich	No	—N/a
"Illusion" (착각)	2026	Onew	Illusion (착각)	Yes	Bang Hye-hyun	Yes	Ditch David, Wiljam, Ninos Hanna, Hautboi Rich	No	—N/a

== Videography ==
=== Video albums ===
List of video albums, with selected chart positions and notes
Title	Details	Peak chart positions		Sales
Title	Details	JPN DVD	JPN BD	Sales
Onew Japan 1st Concert Tour 2022 ~Life Goes On~	Released: December 21, 2022 (JPN); Labels: Universal Music Japan; Formats: DVD, Blu-ray	18	11	JPN: 9,760

=== Korean music videos ===
List of Korean music videos as lead artist, showing year released and directors
Title	Year	Director(s)	Notes	Ref.
"Starry Night" (with Lee Jin-ah)	2016	Shinyoung Kim (Cobb Studio)	Animation	
"Lullaby" (수면제) (with Roco of Rocoberry)	2017	Mustache Films		
"Blue"	2018	Lee Jung-hoon, Kim Gi-hee (Daysdaze)		
"Way" (별 하나) (with Punch)	2021	Unknown	Lyric video	
"Way" (별 하나) (with Punch)	2021	Unknown	Live video	
"Dice"	2022	Kim Nam-suk (Segaji Video)		
"O (Circle)"	2023	Lee Rae-gyeong (BTS Film)		
"All Day" (월화수목금토일)	2024	Unknown	Special clip	
"Beat Drum" (매력)	2024	VM Project Architecture		
"Beat Drum" (매력)	2024	Bart (Flipevil)	Live video	
"Maestro" (마에스트로)	2024	Bart (Flipevil)	Live video	
"Hola!"	2024	Bart (Flipevil)	Live video	
"Yay" (만세)	2024	Kang Mingi (Aarch Film)		
"Winner"	2025	Dong Hyeok Seo (Flipevil)		
"Winner"	2025	Flipevil	Live video	
"Boy" (소년)	2025	Flipevil	Live video	
"Promise You"	2025	Flipevil	Live video	
"Confidence"	2025	Kang Mingi (Aarch Film)		
"Animals"	2025	Yang Siwook (Memudworks)		
"Animals"	2025	Unknown	Live video	
"Tough Love"	2026	Novv Kim		
"Illusion" (착각)	2026	Seong Cheung Gwon/Strtsphr		

=== Japanese music videos ===
List of Japanese music videos as lead artist, showing year released and directors
Title	Year	Director(s)	Notes	Ref.
"Kirakira" (キラキラ)	2022	Raita Kuramoto	Onew does not appear in the music video. Starring Rena Takeda and Jin Suzuki.	
"Life Goes On"	2022	Raita Kuramoto	Starring Hinako Sakurai	
"Uroko" (鱗(うろこ))	2022	Unknown	Live video	
"Hana no Yoni" (花のように)	2025	Ki Youl Chung		
"Kakera -Unmei no Piece-" (Kakera -運命のピース-)	2026	Ki Youl Chung		

=== Soundtrack videos ===
List of soundtrack videos, showing year released and notes
Title	Year	Notes	Ref.
"Shadow"	2021	Containing only scenes from Breakup Probation: One Week	
"Dear My Spring"	2021	Containing only scenes from You Are My Spring	
"Blue" (with Elaine)	2021	Containing only scenes from High Class	
"Mind Warning" (마음주의보)	2022	Containing only scenes from Forecasting Love and Weather	
"For You" (아름다운 너에게)	2024	Special clip	
"Into You"	2026	Containing only scenes from My Royal Nemesis	

=== Other music videos ===
List of other music videos, showing year released and notes
Title	Year	Notes	Ref.
"Vanilla Love" (Lee Hyun-ji featuring Onew)	2008		
"Hope from Kwangya" (as part of SM Town)	2022		
"Hope from Kwangya" (as part of SM Town)	2023	SMCU Palace at Kwangya version	
"The Cure" (with Kangta, BoA, U-Know, Leeteuk, Taeyeon, Suho, Irene, Taeyong, Mark, Kun, and Karina)	2023		
