= Onew the Live: Connection =

2025 concert tour by Onew

- Tour by Onew
- Location: Asia; North America
- Associated album: Connection
- Start date: February 15, 2025
- End date: May 9, 2025
- Legs: 2
- No. of shows: 7 in Asia; 8 in North America; 15 total

Onew concert chronology
- O-New-Note (2023); Onew the Live: Connection (2025); Onew the Live: Percent (%) (2025–2026)

Onew the Live: Connection is the third concert tour by South Korean singer Onew, in support of his fourth Korean EP, Connection. It commenced on February 15, 2025, and concluded on May 9, 2025. It is Onew's first concert tour to include performances outside of Asia.

== Background ==
On December 15, 2024, it was announced that as a part of the promotion for his fourth Korean EP Connection, Onew would commence a concert tour titled, Onew the Live: Connection, starting with performances in February in Japan then Korea, Taiwan, and Macau. The last performance of the Korean concert and the Taiwanese concert were both live-streamed globally online through Fromm platform. The last performance of the Japanese concert was broadcast on Wowow on April 27, 2025.

On February 27, 2025, it was announced that Onew would add an American leg of the tour covering eight U.S. cities. This was Onew's first solo tour in America. The leg was conducted in collaboration with Nomus, an entertainment technology company that operates comprehensive artist IP platforms Wonderwall and Fromm. Tickets for general admission went on sale on March 7, 2025, with presale opening the day before for select cities. Tickets for New York, San Francisco, and Los Angeles performances were sold out.

== Production ==
"Onew the Live" is a new performance brand created by Onew, focusing on bringing Onew's inner stories on stage through live singing. With "Connection" as the subtitle to highlight Onew's focus to create a connection with fans, "Onew the Live: Connection" concert consisted of 4 sections with a setlist encompassing Onew's past, present, and future. The stage production included impressive light effects and backgrounds representing the night sky and underwater to match the songs and maximize the immersion of the performance. Onew served as the producer for this concert.

Onew performed all songs from his latest EPs, Connection and Flow, as well as some songs from his previous Korean releases but performed some of his Japanese songs exclusively at the Japanese performances. At the Korean concert, on the second day Giriboy was invited as a special guest and he sang "Caramel" with Onew. On the third day, Sunwoo Jung-a was invited and she sang a cover of Shinee's song "Selene 6.23" with Onew. Akmu's Lee Su-hyun was invited as a guest on the first day but couldn't attend. On 21 April, 2025, Onew released his first-ever English song "Mad" for his global fans, ahead of his performances in America. He performed the song live for the first time at his concert in Taiwan.

== Set list ==
This set list is representative of the show on February 16, 2025. It does not represent all concerts for the duration of the tour.

1. "Focus"
2. "Shape of My Heart"
3. "Yoake no Sekai"
4. "O (Circle)"
5. "Blue"
6. "Boy"
7. "Dice"
8. "Beat Drum"
9. "Gradation"
10. "All Day"
11. "Kirakira"
12. "Always"
13. "Osoku Okita Asa ni"
14. "Starry Night"
15. "Beauty"
16. "Maestro"
17. "Yay"
18. "Winner"

Encore

19. "Hola!"
20. "Life Goes On"
21. "Conversation"
22. "Promise You"

== Shows ==
Key
†	Indicates performance streamed simultaneously on Fromm Online Platform

List of concerts, showing date, city, country, and venue
Date (2025)	City	Country	Venue
Asia
February 15	Yokohama	Japan	Yokohama Arena
February 16	Yokohama	Japan	Yokohama Arena
February 21	Seoul	South Korea	Olympic Hall
February 22	Seoul	South Korea	Olympic Hall
February 23 †	Seoul	South Korea	Olympic Hall
April 5 †	Taipei	Taiwan	Taipei Music Center
April 20	Macau	China	Broadway Macau
North America
April 24	New York City	United States	The Town Hall
April 26	Detroit	United States	The Fillmore Detroit
April 28	Washington, D.C.	United States	Warner Theatre
April 30	Chicago	United States	Copernicus Center
May 2	Dallas	United States	Music Hall at Fair Park
May 4	Houston	United States	Bayou Music Center
May 7	San Francisco	United States	Palace of Fine Arts
May 9	Los Angeles	United States	Orpheum Theatre
