= Playing the field =

Playing the field, or play the field can refer to:

- Promiscuity
- Dating multiple partners

== Film and television ==
- Playing the Field, a British television series
- Playing the Field (Mark Murphy album), 1960
- Playing the Field (The Outfield album), 1992
- Playing the Field (film), an American film starring Gerard Butler
- Playing the Field, an international title of the 1974 film L'arbitro

== Music ==
- Play the Field, a music festival conducted by Charles Hazlewood
- "Play the Field", a song from the Jacquees album 4275
- "Play the Field", a song from the Jaguar Wright album Divorcing Neo 2 Marry Soul
- "Play the Field", a song part of Onew's discography
- "Play the Field", a song from the Debbit Gibson album Out of the Blue
- "Play the Field", a song by Partner
