= Percent (album) =

Studio album by Onew
- Released: July 15, 2025
- Studio: InGrid (Seoul)
- Genre: K-pop
- Length: 30:23
- Languages: Korean; English
- Label: Griffin
- Producers: Onew; Ditch David

Onew chronology
Connection (2025)	Percent (2025)	Saku (2025)

Singles from Percent
- 1. "Mad" Released: April 21, 2025; 2. "Confidence" Released: June 24, 2025; 3. "Animals" Released: July 15, 2025

Percent is the second Korean-language studio album by South Korean singer Onew. It was released on July 15, 2025, through Griffin Entertainment. The album contains eleven songs, including singles "Mad", "Confidence" and "Animals". It peaked at number four on South Korea's Circle Album Chart.

== Background ==
Onew's first studio album, Circle, was released in March 2023. His output otherwise consisted of extended plays and singles, despite debuting as a soloist in 2018, and he therefore felt it was time to work on another studio album. He participated extensively in the album's production, writing lyrics for seven of the songs and contributing to the arrangement for "Animals". Onew said that working on this album made him realise he couldn't do things alone and that he felt that the album was "only about 60 percent complete". He chose the title because he wanted to express different emotions in numbers, explaining: "Even when we're happy, there's always that little percentage of anxiety, and even when things are tough, there's still some hope. I tried to interpret those everyday feelings exactly as I experience them in this album."

== Composition ==
Each of the album's eleven songs describe different emotions. Opening song "Silky" is a "soft and languid" track that focuses on themes of laziness and rest. "Caffeine" describes the feeling of addiction and is centred around a guitar riff and bassline. "Marshmallow" depicts the moment of falling in love. Lead single "Animals" is driven by a bassline and acoustic guitar, with sounds resembling animal cries. It also features a rap section. "Confidence" contains a message about self-belief. "Oreo Cake" incorporates analog synths. "Far Away" is an alternative rock song reminiscent of the early 2000s. "Mad", which is in English, describes the emotions felt after a break-up, and features drums and acoustic guitar. "Percent (%)" includes drums, snares and "experimental vocal samples that evoke extraterrestrial sounds", while "Epilogue" is a "restrained" piano track. Finally, "Happy Birthday" is a "bright" and "festive" song that expresses hope for the future.

== Release and promotion ==
In April 2025, Onew's agency, Griffin Entertainment, confirmed that he was planning to release his second studio album in July. It was preceded by the singles "Mad", an English song aimed at global fans, and "Confidence", released on April 21 and June 24, respectively. Percent was released on July 15, 2025, alongside lead single "Animals". It came six months after his previous release, Connection. Onew held a showcase at the Myunghwa Live Hall in Seoul to mark the occasion. He also held a pop-up store at the Shinsegae Gangnam Department Store, which featured interactive fan events and attractions. The pop-up store was later held in Shibuya, Taipei and Kaohsiung as well. In August, he embarked on a world tour, titled Onew the Live: Percent (%), featuring stops in Asia, Europe, Latin America and the U.S.

== Track listing ==
Percent track listing
No.	Title	Lyrics	Music	Arrangement	Length
1.	"Silky"	Na Yun-jeong (Lalala Studio); Onew	Noerio (The Hub); Ditch David	Ditch David	2:34
2.	"Caffeine"	Choi Ji-yoon (153/Joombas); Onew	Jacob Aaron (The Hub); Ditch David	Ditch David	2:43
3.	"Marshmallow"	Kang Eun-jeong; Onew	Hautboi Rich; Etham Basden; Song E; Ditch David	Ditch David	2:54
4.	"Animals"	Onew; IZE (153/Joombas)	Jake K (Artiffect); Rokman (Artiffect); Gingerbread; Sam Creighton; Will Jay	Jake K; Gingerbread; Onew; Ditch David	3:00
5.	"Confidence"	Hwang Yu-bin (XYXX)	Wiljam; Ditch David; Hautboi Rich	Ditch David	2:24
6.	"Oreo Cake" (오래 OKㅋ)	Seo Jeong-ah	Ori Rose; Lukas Costas; Elsa Curran; Ditch David; David Burris; Hautboi Rich	Ditch David; David Burris	2:55
7.	"Far Away"	Na Yun-jeong	Ori Rose; Ditch David; Hautboi Rich	Ditch David	2:37
8.	"Mad"	Ori Rose; Onew	Ditch David; Ori Rose; Onew; Hautboi Rich	Ditch David	2:34
9.	"Percent (%)"	Bang Hye-hyun; Onew	Wiljam; Ninos Hanna; Ditch David; Hautboi Rich	Ditch David	2:30
10.	"Epilogue" (에필로그)	Liljune (153/Joombas)	Wiljam; Ninos Hanna; Ditch David; Hautboi Rich	Ditch David; Wiljam	2:30
11.	"Happy Birthday"	Park Rang (XYXX); Onew	Charlie Martin; Joe Housley; Henry Moodie; Sara Boe	The Nocturns	2:59
Total length:					30:23

== Charts ==
=== Weekly charts ===
Weekly chart performance for Percent
Chart (2025)	Peak position
Japanese Digital Albums (Oricon)	6
Japanese Download Albums (Billboard Japan)	4
South Korean Albums (Circle)	4

=== Monthly charts ===
Monthly chart performance for Percent
Chart (2025)	Position
South Korean Albums (Circle)	16
