= Onew =

South Korean singer and actor (born 1989)

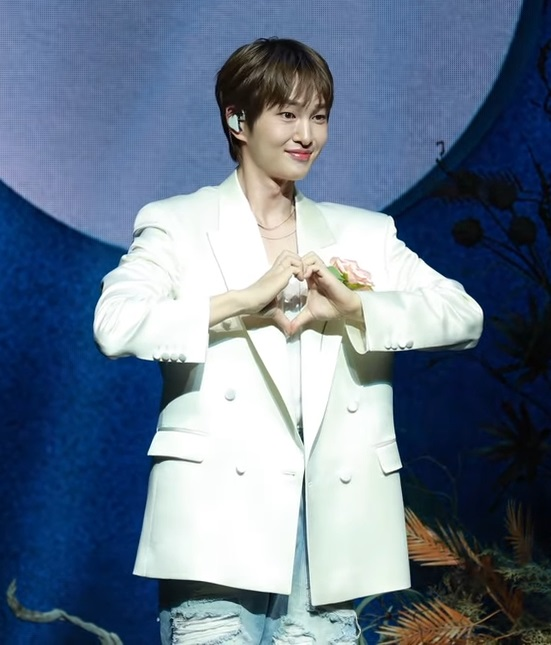
- Onew at the Percent album showcase in July 2025
- Born: Lee Jin-ki; December 14, 1989 (age 36); Gwangmyeong, Gyeonggi Province, South Korea
- Education: Chungwoon University
- Occupations: Singer; actor; songwriter
- Musical career
- Genres: K-pop; R&B; Ballad; J-pop
- Instrument: Vocals
- Years active: 2008–present
- Labels: SM; Universal Japan; Griffin Entertainment; World Entertainment
- Member of: Shinee
- Formerly of: SM Town
- Website: Japan Official Website

Korean name
- Hangul: 이진기
- Hanja: 李珍基
- RR: I Jingi
- MR: I Chin'gi

Stage name
- Hangul: 온유
- Hanja: 溫流
- RR: Onyu
- MR: Onyu

Signature
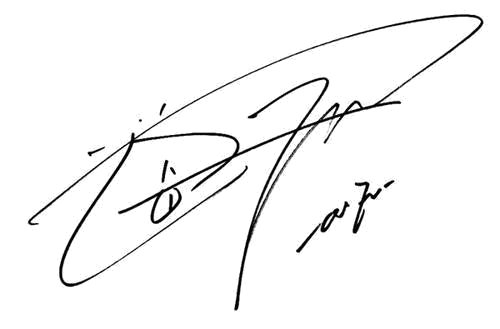

Lee Jin-ki (Korean: 이진기; Korean pronunciation: [i.dʑin.ɡi]; born December 14, 1989), known professionally as Onew, is a South Korean singer-songwriter and actor. Born in Gwangmyeong, Gyeonggi-do, Onew was discovered at the 2006 SM Academy Casting and signed a contract with SM Entertainment the day after his audition. He debuted as the lead vocalist and leader of the South Korean boy band Shinee in May 2008, which went on to become one of the best-selling artists in South Korea.

As a singer, he has participated in the original soundtracks for various TV series and released collaborations with various artists. He made his solo debut on December 5, 2018, with the release of his first extended play, Voice, five days before his military conscription on December 10, 2018. After finishing his military service, he released his second EP, Dice, on April 11, 2022, and later that year on July 6, he made his solo debut in Japan with the release of his first studio album, Life Goes On. He released his first Korean studio album, Circle, on March 6, 2023. He followed this with the release of his third EP, Flow, on September 3, 2024, and his fourth EP, Connection, on January 6, 2025. He released his second Korean studio album, Percent, on July 15, 2025, and his second Japanese EP, Saku, on October 1, 2025. He released his fifth Korean EP, Tough Love, on March 9, 2026. He followed this with the release of his first Japanese single album, Kakera -Unmei no Piece-, on September 16, 2026 and his first Korean single album, Illusion, on October 20, 2026. Onew has also contributed to songwriting for both himself and Shinee.

As an actor, Onew was cast in multiple musicals, such as Rock of Ages (2010), Shinheung Military Academy (2019), and Midnight Sun (2021–2022) and participated in various television dramas, mostly known for the roles of Baek Su in JTBC's sitcom Welcome to Royal Villa and the cardiothoracic resident Lee Chi-hoon in the popular KBS2 drama Descendants of the Sun (2016).

== Career ==
=== 2008–2009: Career beginnings and debut with Shinee ===
Onew was discovered at the 2006 SM Academy Casting. He received great appreciation from Lee Soo-man, SM Entertainment's founder, at Girls' Generation's debut showcase. Lee Soo-man noticed him and wanted to hear him sing during a one-time on-the-spot audition. He signed a contract with the company the day after he auditioned. In 2008, he was chosen as the leader of the group Shinee, and the five-member boy group debuted on May 25, 2008, on SBS' Inkigayo. Shortly after debut, Onew contributed to singles for Lee Hyun-ji in 2008, titled "Vanilla Love" and "Vanilla Love Part 2". In 2009, he recorded the song "One Year Later" with Girls' Generation member Jessica for the Genie EP. The same year, he also sang a duet with Kim Yeon-woo, "The Name I Loved", for Shinee's third EP 2009, Year of Us.

=== 2010–2017: Musical theatre, acting debut and solo activities ===
In 2010, Onew tried his hand at songwriting and, together with his bandmate Minho, wrote the lyrics for the song "Your Name" from Shinee's second studio album Lucifer. In addition to music, Onew became an MC of two programs—KBS2's Night Star, which he co-hosted alongside Shin Dong-yup, Yoon Jong-shin, movie director Jang Hang Joon, and Leessang's Gil, and MBC's Show! Music Core. Since his first job as an MC, Onew has hosted various events, such as Dream Concert, Incheon K-Pop Concert and Mnet's special event in Taiwan called Nihao Taiwan.

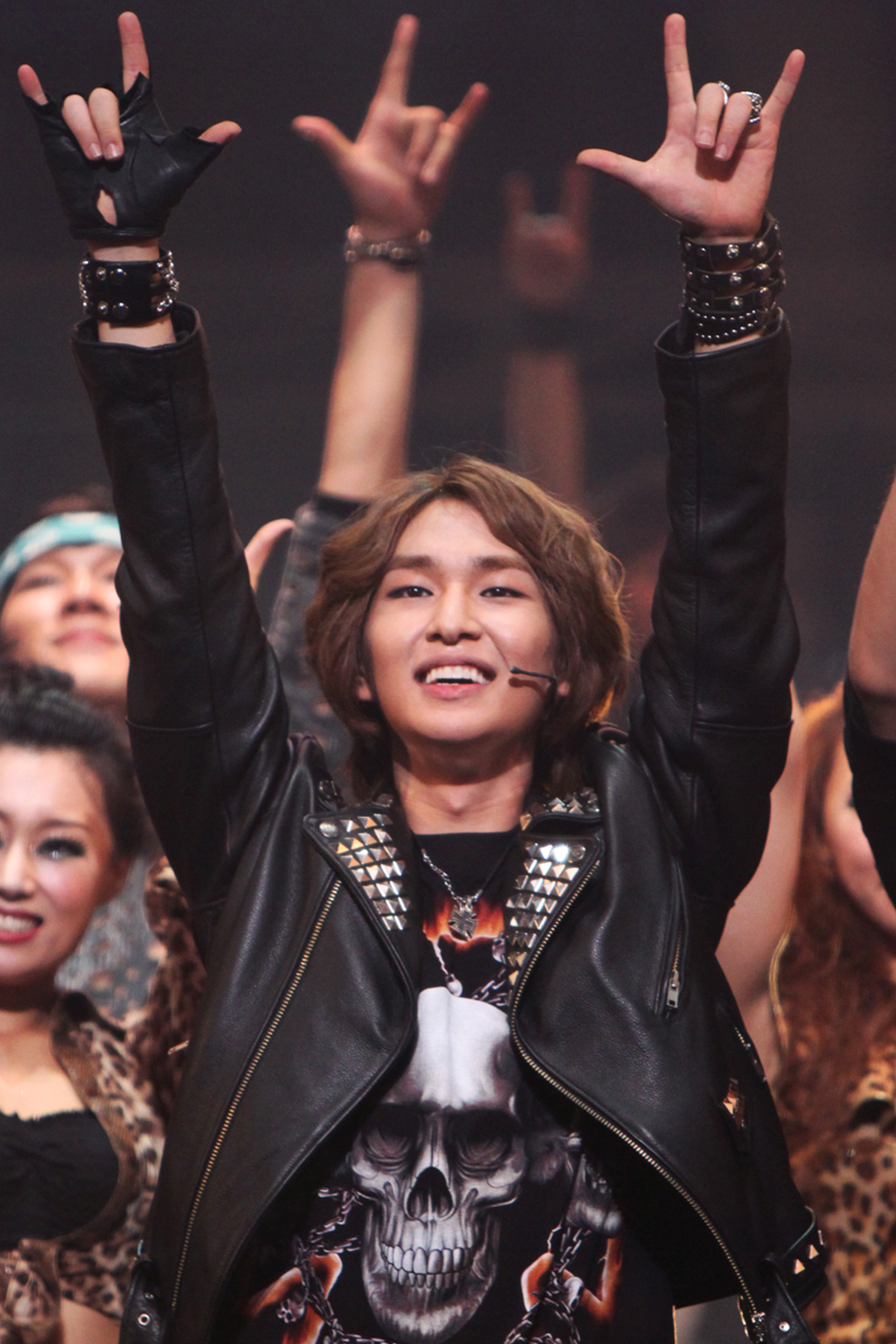
Onew during the musical Rock of Ages, September 2010

Onew starred in various musicals starting from 2010, debuting in the musical Brothers Were Brave alongside singer Lee Ji-hoon. He then starred in the Korean production of Rock of Ages playing the lead role, Drew. Onew has also showcased his acting skills via television like having a cameo role as a clumsy doctor in the drama Dr. Champ. He appeared in the drama's final episode. He also had cameo roles in the dramas Athena: Goddess of War, Oh My God x2, Pure Love and sitcom Royal Villa. In August 2012, Onew recorded a song titled "In Your Eyes" for the drama series To the Beautiful You. Onew also sang the soundtrack "Moonlight" for the drama Miss Korea. The song was released on January 3, 2014.

On January 14, 2014, his participation in the Borneo edition of the reality show Law of the Jungle was confirmed. He was also originally cast for the Brazil edition, but had to be replaced because of schedule conflicts. In addition to his group activities and his job as a MC, Onew gained experience in radio hosting and took over shows like Kiss the Radio, a popular radio program aired on KBS Cool FM which is hosted by his labelmates Super Junior. In June 2014, he was originally planning to appear in the musical Singin' in the Rain but was unable to join as he underwent vocal cord surgery.

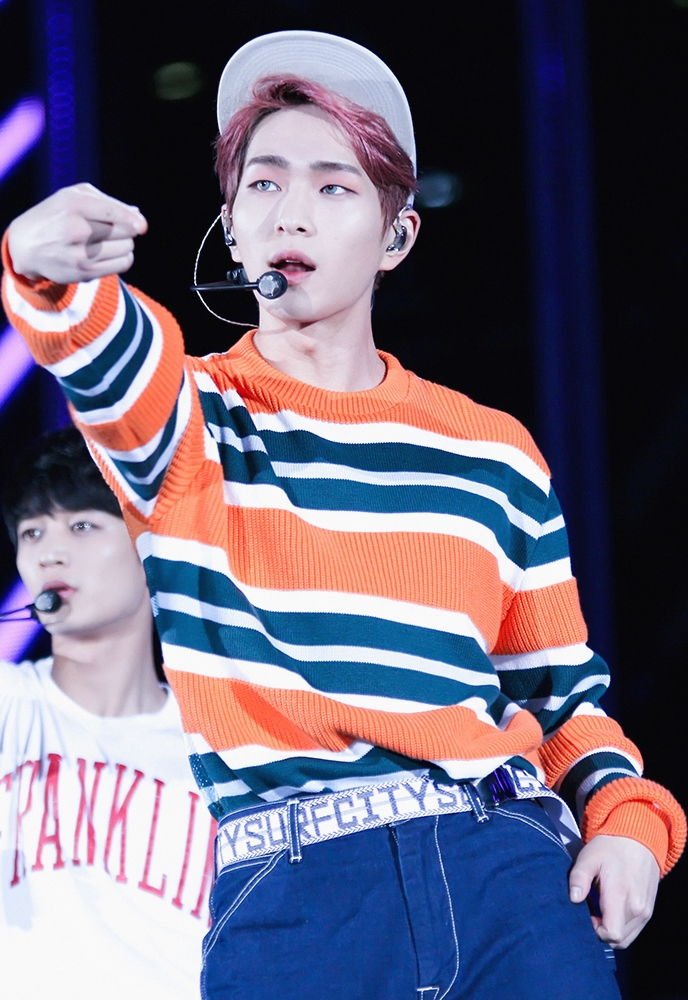
Onew at the Dream Concert, May 2015

In 2016, Onew was cast in the drama Descendants of the Sun, which starred Song Hye-kyo and Song Joong-ki. He portrayed first-year resident Dr. Lee Chi-hoon, a junior of Song Hye-kyo's character. The drama became a huge success, especially in China, where the series reached more than 2 billion views on the Chinese streaming site iQiyi. In Korea, the drama became a massive hit as well, surpassing more than 30 percent viewership ratings nationwide. Onew was awarded the Newcomer Scene Stealer Award at the 2016 Scene Stealer Festival for his role in Descendants of the Sun. Onew was also confirmed for a new tvN program Eat, Sleep, Eat which serves local recipes through Southeast Asia. On August 12, Onew and Lee Jin-ah released a duet, "Starry Night", as part of SM Station, a digital music project by SM Entertainment. It is a pop jazz song which is the work of numerous artists, including Andreas Oberg, a Swedish guitarist and songwriter, and singer-composer Yoo Hee-yeol. In October 2016, Onew wrote the song "So Amazing" for Shinee's fifth Korean studio album 1 of 1, and another song, "Beautiful Life", for its repackaged album, 1 and 1.

In May 2017, Onew and indie duo Rocoberry released the song "Lullaby" as part of SM Station. In June 2017, Onew was featured in Heize's music video for the song "I Don't Know You". In August 2017, shortly before the release of Age of Youth 2, Onew was accused of sexual harassment and decided to leave the project after discussions with the production staff of the show. Onew went into hiatus and did not participate in the remaining shows of Shinee's 2017 concert tour in Japan. On April 6, 2018, after eight months of investigation, the prosecution dropped all charges against him.

=== 2018–2021: Korean solo debut with Voice and military service ===
In May 2018, Onew was featured in Kim Yeon-woo's fifth studio album in the song "Play the Field", which he helped write. Onew's debut EP, Voice, was released on December 5, 2018, with the lead single "Blue". It included two songs co-written by Onew, "Shine On You" and "Illusion". Onew was unable to promote the EP as he enlisted for his mandatory military service as an active duty soldier on December 10, 2018, just five days after its release.

In January 2019, Onew joined the military musical Shinheung Military Academy, which tells the story of patriotic youths who fought to gain independence from Japan. On April 11, 2019, he performed part of the musical at the 100th anniversary of the establishment of South Korea's provisional government. In August 2019, Onew joined another military musical, titled Return: The Promise of That Day, together with Exo member Xiumin, taking the role of the young Seung-ho. The original army musical deals with the topic of excavating the remains of the soldiers who sacrificed themselves to protect their country during the Korean War. Onew was officially discharged from the military on July 8, 2020, 12 days earlier than his expected date of discharge, in light of South Korea's efforts to combat COVID-19.

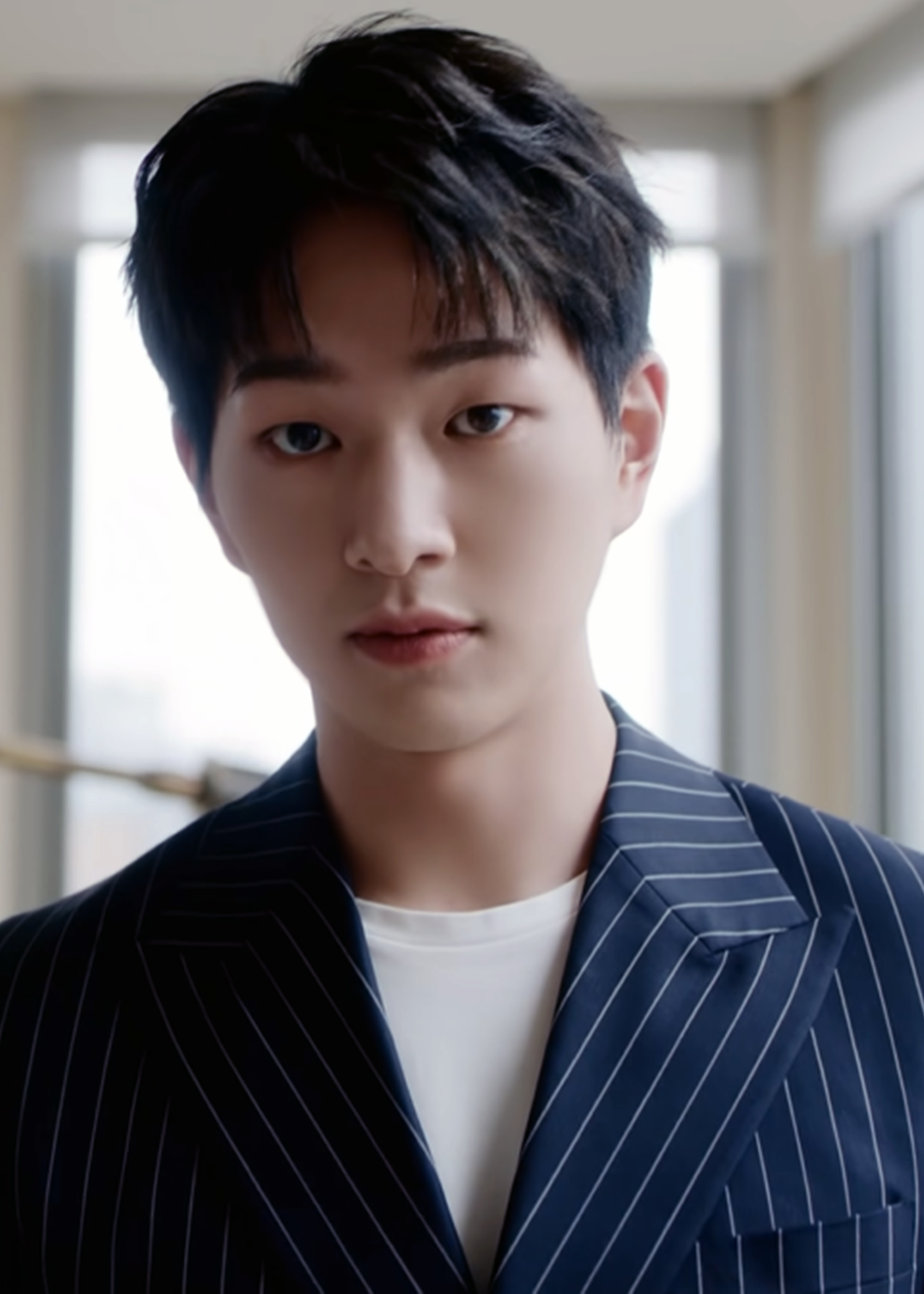
Onew in 2021

In January 2021, Onew resumed activities as part of Shinee. On February 4, 2021, Onew released a song titled "Shadow" as a soundtrack for the drama series Breakup Probation: One Week. In May 2021, Onew was cast in the musical Midnight Sun as the male lead Ha-ram. For the musical soundtrack, Onew released two songs, "Meet Me When the Sun Goes Down" and "Good-bye Days" which is a duet with Kei. In July 2021, Onew appeared as a regular cast member on Sea of Hope, a variety show where celebrities cook and sing for guests. On August 3, 2021, Onew released a song titled "Dear My Spring" as a soundtrack for the drama series You Are My Spring. In September 2021, Onew joined the cast of March of the Ants Chapter 5, a reality show about investing in the stock market. On October 5, 2021, Onew and Elaine released a duet, "Blue", as part of the soundtrack for the drama series High Class.

In November 2021, Onew participated in the Korea On Stage project, for which he visited and filmed singing performances at Yangdong Folk Village as part of the Cultural Heritage Administration and the Korea Cultural Heritage Foundation's tourist campaign to promote Korea's cultural heritage. In December 2021, Onew was cast in SM C&C Studio's web variety show Soldier Idol Camp and short-form horror movie 4 Minutes 44 Seconds. On December 6, 2021, Onew and Punch released a duet, "Way", as part of SM Station. The single featured lyrics written by Onew alongside established songwriter Kim Eana. On December 27, 2021, Onew, alongside labelmates Kyuhyun and Taeil, released the song "Ordinary Day" for SM Entertainment's winter album 2021 Winter SM Town: SMCU Express.

=== 2022: Dice, Japanese solo debut and first solo concert tour ===
Onew for Marie Claire Korea, April 2022

On February 27, Onew released a song titled "Mind Warning" as a soundtrack for the drama series Forecasting Love and Weather. In March, it was announced that Onew would reprise his role as Ha-ram for the 2022 production of Midnight Sun. In the musical soundtrack released on April 30, Onew participated in two songs, "The Sun is in My Eyes" and a duet, "A Melody Called You", with Kim Nam-joo. On April 11, Onew's second EP, Dice, was released with the lead single of the same name. This marked Onew's first solo comeback after his discharge from the military and his first time promoting as a soloist. He stated that he sought diversity with this EP; like the six-faced object, it consists of six tracks showing different aspects of himself as a soloist. One of the tracks is "In the Whale", a special song showing his affection and gratefulness to fans, which Onew wrote lyrics for.

As a pre-release of his Japanese debut album, Onew released a digital EP, Who Sings? Vol.1, on June 1. The EP includes four cover songs: Kazumasa Oda's "Kirakira", which was released on May 18, Motohiro Hata's "Uroko", which was released on May 25, Misia's "Everything", and Dreams Come True's "Yasashii Kissete". On July 6, Onew released his first Japanese studio album, Life Goes On, with the lead single of the same name, which was pre-released on June 22. Before its physical release, the album was released digitally on June 29. The album contains ten tracks, including six original tracks and the four covers previously included in Who Sings? Vol.1. On July 8, he embarked on his first solo concert tour in Japan, starting with a concert at the Nippon Budokan in Tokyo. The tour consisted of eight sold-out concerts stopping at four cities. Six concerts were originally scheduled, with two additional performances added later to accommodate demand, taking place on September 10 and 11 at Yoyogi National Gymnasium in Tokyo. On September 9, Onew released his Japanese single titled "Dance Whole Day" which was specially prepared to be performed at his last additional concerts. The single was later released in Korea on September 15. The last concert of the tour was broadcast live on TBS Television.

On December 26, Onew released songs "The Cure" and "Where You Are", collaborating with other labelmates for SM Entertainment's winter album 2022 Winter SM Town: SMCU Palace. "The Cure", which is the album's lead single, shares a message of solidarity with the global movement to combat climate change to embrace a sustainable future.

=== 2023: First Korean solo concert, Circle and health hiatus ===
On January 26, it was announced that Onew would hold his first Korean concert, titled O-New-Note, at the Olympic Hall in Seoul on March 4–5. An additional concert on March 3 was later added after tickets were sold out upon release. The last day of the concert was live-streamed globally online through Beyond Live and was simultaneously watched in 74 regions around the world. On March 6, Onew released his first Korean studio album, Circle, with the lead single "O (Circle)". The album contains ten songs in which he tried different methods of singing, exhibiting his musical tastes rather than showing off what he can do. He chose the words "healing," "recovery" and "circulation" as the album's keywords. On March 14–15, Onew held his concert O-New-Note in Japan at the Yoyogi National Gymnasium in Tokyo attracting 22,000 people. At the concert, he sang a new unreleased Japanese single titled "Inspiration". On March 18, Onew received his first music show win as a solo artist on MBC's Show! Music Core. On March 22, both "Inspiration" and another Japanese single titled "Knock On My Door" were released digitally.

On June 9, it was announced that Onew would be unable to participate in the Korean concert of Shinee's tour, Shinee World VI: Perfect Illumination, and promotions for their eighth studio album due to health issues. It was later announced that he would also sit out of the Japanese dates of the tour. Onew revealed later that he had throat surgery during his hiatus, stating: "There were psychological issues, but the physical issues were bigger. That's why I lost a lot of weight."

=== 2024: New agency, Flow and Hola! fan concert ===
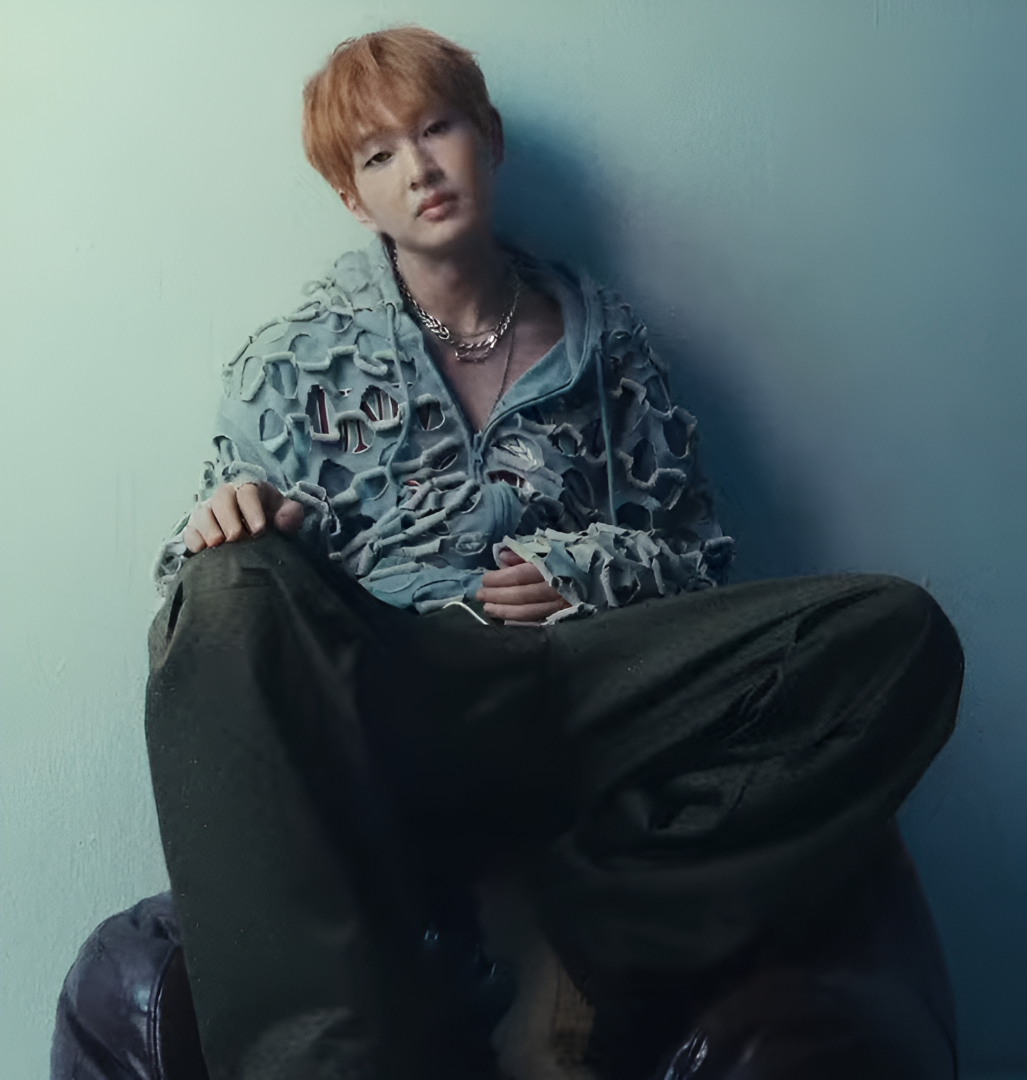
Onew for Marie Claire Korea, May 2024

On April 3, it was announced that Onew had signed with a new agency, Griffin Entertainment, for his solo activities after his contract with SM Entertainment ended in late March. His group activities with Shinee remained unchanged under SM. On April 21, Onew made his first public appearance after about 10 months health hiatus, performing at the 2024 Star Awards in Singapore. On May 17, Onew embarked on his first-ever solo Asian fan meeting tour, titled Guess!, with a performance at Sejong University Daeyang Hall in Seoul. He performed a new unreleased song titled "All Day". The tour was originally scheduled to have six performances in Seoul, Osaka, and Yokohama, but additional performances in Macau, Manila, Kaohsiung, Singapore and Kuala Lumpur were added later to accommodate demand. The Kuala Lumpur stop was later cancelled due to unforeseen circumstances from the local promoter. The tour concluded on July 21 with a total of twelve performances in seven Asian cities. Onew resumed his activities with Shinee, joining their encore concert Shinee World VI Perfect Illumination: Shinee's Back, which was held at the Inspire Arena in Incheon on May 24–26, celebrating their 16th debut anniversary. After being crowned as Best Song Stealer on MBC's Song Stealer, Onew's cover of Byul's debut song "December 32 Days" was digitally released on June 24. Onew released "All Day" as a single on July 15.

On September 3, Onew released his third Korean EP, Flow, with the lead single "Beat Drum". The EP, for which he participated in producing and writing the lyrics for all its tracks, contains six songs including the pre-released single "All Day". He mentioned that while his previous album, Circle, centered around the theme of life's cycles, Flow focuses on the movement within these cycles and how people should do their best in those situations while still preserving their unique identities. He said that he tried to choose songs that everyone could easily sing along to and enjoy at a concert, aiming to be closer to the public. On October 5–6, Onew held his fan concert, titled Hola!, at the SK Olympic Handball Gymnasium in Seoul with the last day live-streamed globally online through Fromm platform. Additionally, he held the fan concert in Taipei on November 2 and in Yokohama on November 21–22. The last performance was broadcast later on Wowow.

On November 6, Onew released a song titled "For You" as a soundtrack for the popular webtoon No Office Romance!. On December 12, Onew released the single "Yay", serving as a pre-release for his upcoming EP. Onew held his first offline birthday party since debut, O! New Day, on December 14, at KBS Arena.

=== 2025: Connection, Percent, Saku and concert tours ===
On January 6, Onew released his fourth Korean EP, Connection, with the lead single "Winner". The EP contains six songs, including the pre-released single "Yay". Once again, Onew participated in this EP's entire production and lyric writing. He embarked on his concert tour titled, Onew the Live: Connection, starting the Asia leg with two concerts at the Yokohama Arena in Japan on February 15–16, followed by performances in Korea, Taiwan, and finally Macau on April 20. The American leg of the tour covered eight U.S. cities starting with New York on April 24, and wrapping up in Los Angeles on May 9. On March 7, Onew hosted a special concert, titled Onew's Spring Songs, at the Tokyo Garden Theater in Japan in which Wolf Howl Harmony performed as a guest. The concert was broadcast later on TBS Television. Onew released his first-ever English song "Mad" and another song titled "Confidence" on April 21, and June 24, respectively, serving as pre-releases for his upcoming album.

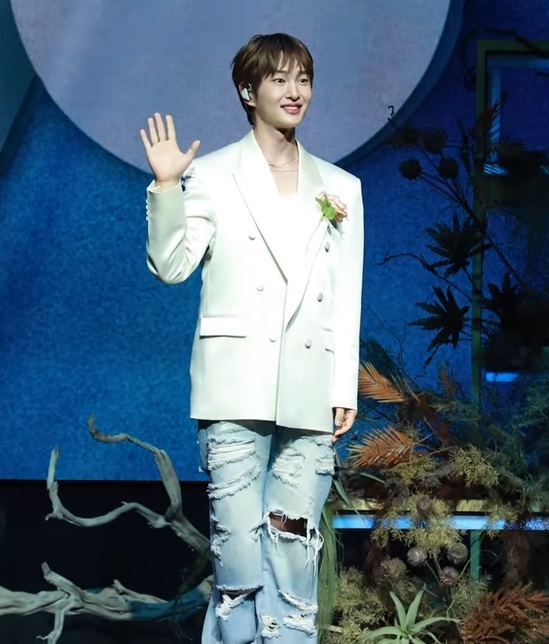
Onew at the Percent album showcase, July 2025

On July 15, Onew released his second Korean studio album, Percent, with the lead single "Animals". The album contains eleven tracks, including the pre-released singles "Mad" and "Confidence", with each track capturing different emotions through different music genres. Onew participated in the album's entire production and wrote the lyrics for seven tracks. Onew chose the album title and the theme of Percent because he wanted to express different emotions in numbers. Onew embarked on his first world tour, titled Onew the Live: Percent (%), with performances at the SK Olympic Handball Gymnasium in Seoul on August 2–3. The tour covered twenty-one cities in Asia, South America, Europe, and North America, including performances at the Nippon Budokan in Tokyo on October 3–5, and concluded with encore performances on January 31 and February 1, 2026, in Seoul.

On October 1, Onew released his second Japanese EP, Saku, which means (flowers) blooming in Japanese, with the lead single "Hana no Yoni". The EP contains five songs, each telling a story related to flowers.

=== 2026–present: Tough Love, Kakera, Illusion and concert tour ===
On March 9, 2026, Onew released his fifth Korean EP, Tough Love, with the lead single of the same name. The EP contains five songs about different facets of love. Onew participated not only in the lyrics for all five tracks, but also in the composition for two tracks on this EP. On April 3, 2026, he embarked on an Asian fan meeting tour with the same title with performances covering five Asian cities, Taipei, Seoul, Hong Kong, Osaka and Tokyo. On June 6, 2026, Onew released a song titled "Into You" as a soundtrack for the drama series My Royal Nemesis.

On September 16, 2026, Onew released his Japanese single album, Kakera -Unmei no Piece-, in which the subtitle means pieces of destiny in Japanese, with the lead single of the same name. Before its physical release, the title track was released digitally on September 9, 2026. The single which is themed around connection and bonds like puzzle pieces, contains three original songs and two cover songs: Kirinji's "Aliens" and Aoi Teshima's "Letter to Tomorrow". On September 22, 2026, Onew embarked on his concert tour titled, Onew the Live: Q, which covered three Asian cities, Tokyo, Taipei and Seoul.

On October 20, 2026, Onew released his first Korean single album, Illusion, which consists of three singles including the main leading single of the same name in addition to "Mind Games" in collaboration with Yuju and "Tic Tac Toe" in collaboration with Zico which were pre-released on September 29 and October 7 respectively. The single album explores the emotional differences in how people perceive the same situation through various genres and moods capturing Onew's diverse musical colors. Onew contributed to every song, including writing the lyrics and composing.

On November 1, 2026, at the last performance of his concert, Onew the Live: Q, it was announced that Onew will release his sixth Korean EP in February, 2027. Onew is planning to hold a new concert titled, Onew the Live: Soar, on January 14–15, 2027 at the Tokyo Garden Theater in Japan.

== Personal life ==
Onew is an only child. He became interested in music at a young age when he started to play the piano. Later, his passion inspired him to pursue a career in the music industry. Onew graduated from the Gwangmyeong Information Industry High School. In his senior year, he ranked second in his grade and held the highest national score for his high school SATs exam. He started attending Chungwoon University, majoring in broadcasting music. After receiving his bachelor's degree he continued to attend the university for his master's degree which he earned in practical music.

== Vocals ==
Onew is one of the main vocalists of Shinee and is known for his distinctively unique vocal color and for his calm and understated voice, providing the strong vocal foundation of the group with fellow member Jonghyun. In June 2014, Onew underwent a vocal cord polyp removal and vocal fold mucosa reconstruction operation, which made him unable to sing for a few months. In December 2014, Kim Yeon-woo, Onew's vocal coach, revealed during a radio broadcast that Onew's condition had improved after the surgery. He also confirmed that Onew's vocal range "improved and he can make sounds comfortably too".

Although considered one of K-pop's most instantly recognizable vocalists, Onew has stated that his unique vocal tone was not something he liked when he was young, but learned to appreciate more growing up, explaining: "When I was younger, I didn't really like my voice because I couldn't imitate anyone, but looking at it from a different perspective, I learned that such uniqueness could be my weapon — so I'd say my biggest strength is that whatever new genres I try, it somehow becomes something uniquely 'Onew-like'".

== Philanthropy ==
In order to support Onew in the musical Rock of Ages, in 2010, his fans had donated 1.44 tons of rice, a common practice for fans in South Korea, with the expectation that the idol will then donate to a charity of their choice—Onew donated it to help feed North Korean children, which was prepared by the Child Development Program. Onew also donated 770 kg of rice to children in need in South Korea in May 2010. In 2016, Onew donated roughly 1.2 million won to the Korean Heart Association.

== Controversy ==
=== Harassment allegations ===
In August 2017, Onew was accused of sexual harassment. The victim stated that on August 12 in a night club in Gangnam, Onew, who was intoxicated, touched her leg two or three times as he tried to stand up, over the course of two hours while she was dancing on one of the club's multiple dancing platforms that was adjacent to where Onew was seated. However, she acknowledged that such incidents could happen under the influence of alcohol and withdrew the charge. Nevertheless, the case was forwarded to the prosecution as a recommendation for indictment without detention. After a four-month hiatus, Onew posted a letter of apology, which was accepted widely among his fans, but others called for him to step down from Shinee. On April 5, 2018, SM Entertainment announced that the charges against him had been dismissed by the prosecutors.

== Discography ==
Studio albums

- Life Goes On (2022)
- Circle (2023)
- Percent (2025)

== Filmography ==
=== Film ===
| Year | Title | Role | Notes | Ref. |
|---|---|---|---|---|
| 2012 | I Am | Himself | SM Town documentary | |
| 2015 | SM Town the Stage | Himself | SM Town concert film | |
| 2024 | 4 Minutes 44 Seconds | Yoo Gi-chul | | |

=== Television ===
| Year | Title | Role | Notes | Ref. |
|---|---|---|---|---|
| 2010 | Dr. Champ | Park Ki-young | Cameo | |
| 2010 | Athena: Goddess of War | Himself | Cameo | |
| 2012 | Oh My God 2 | Himself | Cameo | |
| 2013 | Pure Love | Choi Joon-young's cousin | Cameo | |
| 2013 | Welcome to Royal Villa | Baek-soo | Sitcom | |
| 2016 | Descendants of the Sun | Lee Chi-hoon | | |

=== Variety shows ===
| Year | Title | Role | Notes | Ref. |
|---|---|---|---|---|
| 2010 | Night Star | Host | | |
| 2010–2011 | Show! Music Core | Host | with Bae Suzy, Choi Min-ho, Park Ji-yeon | |
| 2014 | Law of the Jungle – Borneo and Brazil edition | Main cast | | |
| 2016 | Eat, Sleep, Eat in Kudat | Main cast | | |
| 2016 | Eat, Sleep, Eat in Sentosa | Main cast | | |
| 2021 | Sea of Hope | Main cast | | |
| 2022 | Hello Onew | Host | | |
| 2022 | The Travelog | Cast Member | | |
| 2024 | Song Stealer | Contestant | Crowned as Best Song Stealer for episodes 7–8 | |

=== Web shows ===
| Year | Title | Role | Notes | Ref. |
|---|---|---|---|---|
| 2020–2022 | Jinki Jangpan | Host | | |
| 2021 | March of the Ants | Main cast | Season 5 | |
| 2021 | Soldier Idol Camp | Main cast | | |

=== Radio ===
| Year | Title | Role | Ref. |
|---|---|---|---|
| 2016 | Kiss the Radio | Special DJ | |

=== Music video appearances ===
| Year | Title | Artist | Ref. |
|---|---|---|---|
| 2017 | "Don't Know You" | Heize | |

== Musical theatre ==
| Year | Title | Role | Ref. |
|---|---|---|---|
| 2010 | Brothers Were Brave | Joo-bong | |
| 2010 | Rock of Ages | Drew | |
| 2019 | Shinheung Military Academy | Ji Chung-chun | |
| 2019 | Return: The Promise of the Day | Young Seung-ho | |
| 2021 | Midnight Sun | Jung Ha-ram | |
| 2022 | Midnight Sun | Jung Ha-ram | |

== Concerts and tours ==
=== Headlining tours and concerts ===
- Life Goes On Tour (2022)
- O-New-Note (2023)
- Onew the Live: Connection (2025)
- Onew's Spring Songs (2025)
- Onew the Live: Percent (%) (2025–2026)
- Onew the Live: Q (2026)
- Onew the Live: Soar (2027)

=== Fan concerts ===
- Onew Fan Concert 'Hola!' (2024)

=== Fan meetings ===
- Onew Fan Meeting 'Guess!' Asia Tour (2024)
- Onew B-Day Party 'O! New Day' (2024)
- Onew Fan Meeting 'Tough Love' (2026)

=== Showcases ===
- Onew 2nd Album [Percent] Showcase (2025)

=== Award shows ===
- 2024 Star Awards (2024)

=== Affiliated tours and concerts ===
- SM Town Live 2022: SMCU Express at Kwangya (2022)
- SM Town Live 2022: SMCU Express at Tokyo (2022)
- SM Town Live 2023: SMCU Palace at Kwangya (2023)

=== Guest appearances ===
- Jonghyun – The Agit: The Story by Jonghyun (2015)
- Kim Yeon-woo – Thank You (2016)

=== Concert and festival participation ===
- We Are All One – Let's Love K-pop Concert (2022)
- Tone & Music Festival (2024)
- Beat AX Vol.4 (2024)
- Waterbomb Suwon (2024)
- Someday Festival (2024)
- SNU Fall Festival (2024)
- Idol Radio Live in Tokyo – Shining Moments (2024)
- WaWow! Festival (2024)
- KNUT Festival – Young : One (2024)
- Someday Christmas in Busan (2024)
- 2024 Supersound Festival in Macau (2025)
- Burn Art Festival (2025)
- Someday Pleroma (2025)
- Someday Festival (2025)
- Stage W for Chungnam (2025)
- Festival Shiwol Busan Jazz Festa (2025)
- Madly Medley (2025)
- Miracle Seoul: A Christmas Story (2025)
- e& DSF Nights: Volume 2 (2026)
- Sustainable Wave Festival (2026)
- Fubon Guardians High School (2026)
- Venue101 Extra (2026)
- HUFS Festival – QUINQUATRIA : Twilight (2026)
- LG Dream Festival (2026)
- KDay Tokyo (2026)
- Seoul Runners Festival (2026)

== Awards and nominations ==
Name of the award ceremony, year presented, category, nominee of the award, and the result of the nomination
| Award ceremony | Year | Category | Nominee / work | Result | Ref. |
|---|---|---|---|---|---|
| SBS Gayo Daejeon | 2015 | Leader of the Year | Shinee | Won | |
| Scene Stealer Festival | 2016 | Newcomer Scene Stealer Award (Male) | Descendants of the Sun | Won | |
| Supersound Festival | 2024 | Male Solo Artist of the Year Grand Prize | Onew | Won | |
| MAMA Awards | 2026 | Best Dance Performance – Male Solo | "Tough Love" | Nominated | |
