= Tough Love (Onew EP) =

EP by Onew
- Released: March 9, 2026
- Genre: K-pop
- Length: 14:40
- Language: Korean
- Label: Griffin
- Producers: Onew; Ditch David

Onew chronology
Saku (2025)	Tough Love (2026)

Singles from Tough Love
- 1. "Tough Love" Released: March 9, 2026

Tough Love is the fifth Korean extended play (EP) by South Korean singer Onew. It was released on March 9, 2026, through Griffin Entertainment. The EP contains five songs about different aspects of love, including the lead single, "Tough Love". It peaked at number three on South Korea's Circle Album Chart.

== Composition ==
The EP contains five songs about "various facets of love". Onew wrote the lyrics for all tracks and received composition credits for the first time. He said that he tried to weave together different stories about love like a novel while avoiding clichés. Opening track "Dot Dot Dot (...)" is an R&B song with a minimalistic beat. The lyrics use ellipses to represent tension in a relationship. Onew collaborated with international producers for lead single "Tough Love", which he described as a "turning point" in the EP, explaining that it captured "the rawest expressions of love" without romanticisation. "Flex on Me" has a heavy bass line and emphasises the importance of love over material wealth. "Lie" is an emotional song about being deceived by a lover. Finally, "X, Oh Why?" has an escalating beat and heavy drop, with lyrics about saying goodbye to an ex.

== Release and promotion ==
Onew held encore concerts of his tour, Onew the Live: Percent (%), in Seoul on January 31 – February 1, 2026, where he performed an unreleased song, "X, Oh Why?". During the final show, he revealed a trailer announcing a new EP, titled Tough Love. His agency, Griffin Entertainment, officially confirmed the EP's release two days later. To promote the EP, he uploaded scrapbook-style concept photos to social media, showcasing six different collages all featuring hearts. He also shared various other forms of promotional content, such as track videos, music video teasers, and an album preview containing snippets of each song. Onew held a pop-up store from March 8 to March 15 in Seoul, featuring a photo zone, message zone and event zone for fans to participate in. Tough Love was released on March 9 alongside the music video for the lead single. Onew promoted the EP on music shows for the first time in three years, beginning with a performance on M Countdown. He embarked on a fan meeting tour across Asia in April 2026.

== Track listing ==
Tough Love track listing
No.	Title	Lyrics	Music	Arrangement	Length
1.	"Dot Dot Dot (...)"	Onew; Lee Aeng-du (153/Joombas)	Ditch David; Fabian Zeke; Ninos Hanna; Hautboi Rich	Ditch David	2:49
2.	"Tough Love"	Onew; Lee Seu-ran; Ryan Bickley	Onew; Ditch David; Ryan Bickley; Freedo	Ditch David; Freedo	2:37
3.	"Flex on Me"	Onew; Ditch David; Chris Wahle; Jack Samson; Hautboi Rich	Ditch David; Chris Wahle; Jack Samson; Hautboi Rich	Ditch David	3:10
4.	"Lie"	Onew; RGB (Lalala Studio); Ha Shin-young (Papermaker)	Onew; Ditch David; Shakka; Bhav	Ditch David; Bhav	3:15
5.	"X, Oh Why?"	Onew; Min Yeon-jae (Lalala Studio); 3! (Lalala Studio)	Ditch David; Wiljam; Jack Samson; Hautboi Rich	Ditch David	2:49
Total length:					14:40

== Charts ==
=== Weekly chart ===
Weekly chart performance for Tough Love
Chart (2026)	Peak position
Japanese Digital Albums (Oricon)	9
Japanese Download Albums (Billboard Japan)	7
South Korean Albums (Circle)	3

=== Monthly chart ===
Monthly chart performance for Tough Love
Chart (2026)	Peak position
South Korean Albums (Circle)	12
