= Chungwoon University =

University in Gongju, South Korea

- 청운대학교
- Former names: Chungnam Industrial University
- Type: Private
- Established: December 28, 1993
- Chancellor: Lee Sang-ryul
- President: Kim Hui-jung
- Students: 6,600
- Location: South Korea; 36.58063°N 126.66125°E
- Campus: Multiple sites
- Colors: Blue
- Mascot: Cinereous vulture
- Website: home.chungwoon.ac.kr

Korean name
- Hangul: 청운대학교
- Hanja: 靑雲大學校
- RR: Cheongun daehakgyo
- MR: Ch'ŏngun taehakkyo

Chungwoon University (Korean: 청운대학교) is a private university in western South Korea. The campus is located in Hongseong County in South Chungcheong province. The current president is Kim Hui-jung (김희중).

== Academics ==
Undergraduate offerings are divided among the divisions of Humanities, Technology, and Arts.

== History ==
The university first opened in 1993. The graduate school was opened in 1997.

== Sister schools ==
Ties exist with schools in China, Vietnam and the United States.

== Notable alumni ==
- So Ji-sub, model and actor
- Choi Daniel, actor
- Leeteuk, singer and actor (Super Junior)
- Kim Hee-chul, presenter, singer and actor (Super Junior)
- Yesung, singer and actor (Super Junior)
- Shindong, singer and actor (Super Junior)
- Eunhyuk, singer and actor (Super Junior)
- Donghae, singer and actor (Super Junior)
- Yunho, singer (TVXQ)
- Onew, singer, actor (Shinee)
- Kim Jong-hyun, singer, composer, presenter and producer (Shinee)

== See also ==
- List of colleges and universities in South Korea
- Education in South Korea
