= Onew the Live: Percent (%) =

2025–2026 concert tour by Onew

- Tour by Onew
- Location: Asia; South America; Europe; North America
- Associated album: Percent; Saku
- Start date: August 2, 2025
- End date: February 1, 2026
- Legs: 4
- No. of shows: 10 in Asia; 3 in South America; 8 in Europe; 5 in North America; 26 total

Onew concert chronology
- Onew the Live: Connection (2025); Onew the Live: Percent (%) (2025–2026)

Onew the Live: Percent (%) is the fourth concert tour by South Korean singer Onew, in support of his second Korean studio album, Percent, and second Japanese EP, Saku. It commenced on August 2, 2025, and concluded on February 1, 2026. It is Onew's first world tour.

== Background ==
On June 16, 2025, it was announced that as a part of the promotion for his second Korean studio Percent, Onew would commence a concert tour titled, Onew the Live: Percent (%), starting with performances on August 2–3 in Korea and later on October 3–5 in Japan. "Onew the Live" is a performance brand created by Onew, that highlights his trusted live performances. Following his last tour with the subtitle "Connection", he added the subtitle "Percent (%)" for this tour, highlighting the beauty of making up for whatever the other lacks. On July 3, it was announced that the performances announced before are part of Onew's first world tour, which covers sixteen cities in Asia, South America, and Europe. The last performance of the Korean concert was live-streamed globally online through Fromm platform.

On August 24, it was revealed that the Japanese concert would also serve as part of the promotion for Onew's second Japanese EP, Saku, which was released on October 1, 2025. On October 21, it was announced that Onew would expand his world tour to include five more cities in the U.S. The tour's legs in Europe, South America and the U.S was conducted in collaboration with Nomus, an entertainment technology company that operates comprehensive artist IP platforms Wonderwall and Fromm.

On December 15, 2025, it was announced that Onew would hold encore performances in Korea on January 31 and February 1, 2026 to conclude his first world tour. At the concerts, Onew premiered a new unreleased song, "X, Oh Why?", from his upcoming fifth Korean EP, Tough Love, which is set to be released on March 9, 2026. The last performance of the encore was live-streamed globally online through Fromm platform.

== Set list ==
This set list is representative of the shows on August 2–3, 2025. It does not represent all concerts for the duration of the tour.

1. "Percent (%)"
2. "No Parachute"
3. "Yeowoobi"
4. "Far Away"
5. "Conversation"
6. "All Day"
7. "Maestro"
8. "Paradise"
9. "Winner" (Acoustic)
10. "Timepiece"
11. "Epilogue"
12. "Silky"
13. "Sunshine"
14. "Beat Drum"
15. "Expectations"
16. "Caffeine"
17. "Animals"

Encore

18. "Oreo Cake"
19. "Yay"
20. "Happy Birthday"

== Shows ==
Key
†	Indicates performance streamed simultaneously on Fromm Online Platform

List of concerts, showing date, city, country, venue, and attendance (Note: The Mardrid performance was initially set to be held on November 14, 2025 but the date and venue were changed due to unavoidable local venue circumstances.)
Date	City	Country	Venue	Attendance
Asia
August 2, 2025	Seoul	South Korea	SK Olympic Handball Gymnasium	—N/a
August 3, 2025 †	Seoul	South Korea	SK Olympic Handball Gymnasium	—N/a
August 16, 2025	Hong Kong	China	TungPo Kitty Woo Stadium	—N/a
September 13, 2025	Bangkok	Thailand	MCC Hall, The Mall Lifestore Ngamwongwan	—N/a
October 3, 2025	Tokyo	Japan	Nippon Budokan	20,000
October 4, 2025	Tokyo	Japan	Nippon Budokan	20,000
October 5, 2025	Tokyo	Japan	Nippon Budokan	20,000
October 18, 2025	Kaohsiung	Taiwan	Kaohsiung Music Center	—N/a
South America
October 30, 2025	São Paulo	Brazil	Terra SP	—N/a
November 1, 2025	Santiago	Chile	Teatro La Cúpula	—N/a
November 4, 2025	Mexico City	Mexico	Auditorio BB	—N/a
Europe
November 9, 2025	Paris	France	Salle Pleyel	—N/a
November 11, 2025	London	United Kingdom	Indigo at The O2	—N/a
November 13, 2025	Madrid	Spain	Sala La Riviera	—N/a
November 16, 2025	Helsinki	Finland	Kulttuuritalo	—N/a
November 18, 2025	Copenhagen	Denmark	Poolen	—N/a
November 20, 2025	Tilburg	Netherlands	013	—N/a
November 25, 2025	Warsaw	Poland	Progresja	—N/a
November 27, 2025	Berlin	Germany	Huxleys Neue Welt	—N/a
North America
January 9, 2026	San Jose	United States	San Jose Civic	—N/a
January 11, 2026	Los Angeles	United States	The Orpheum	—N/a
January 14, 2026	Chicago	United States	Copernicus Center	—N/a
January 16, 2026	New York	United States	King's Theatre	—N/a
January 18, 2026	Atlanta	United States	Atlanta Symphony Hall	—N/a

=== Encore ===
List of encore concerts, showing date, city, country, venue, and attendance
Date	City	Country	Venue	Attendance
January 31, 2026	Seoul	South Korea	SK Olympic Handball Gymnasium	—N/a
February 1, 2026 †	Seoul	South Korea	SK Olympic Handball Gymnasium	—N/a
