= Voice (Onew EP) =

- Digital cover

EP by Onew
- Released: December 5, 2018
- Studios: In Grid (Seoul); SM Big Shot (Seoul); SM Blue Ocean (Seoul); SM LVYIN (Seoul)
- Genres: K-pop; R&B
- Length: 26:38
- Language: Korean
- Labels: SM; iRiver

Onew chronology
Voice (2018)	Dice (2022)

Singles from Voice
- 1. "Blue" Released: December 5, 2018

Voice is the debut extended play by South Korean singer Onew. It was released on December 5, 2018, under SM Entertainment, five days before his military conscription. "Blue" served as the album's lead single.

== Background and release ==
In November 2018, SM Entertainment announced that Onew would be enlisting in the Korean military as part of his required military duties. On November 22, the label announced that Onew would be the fourth Shinee member to make a solo debut, with plans to release the album ahead of his enlistment in early December.

The album's title was announced on November 28, along with its title track and release date. The full tracklist was revealed on December 3, with the music video teaser for "Blue" releasing the following day. The full album and music video were released on December 5.

== Commercial reception ==
Voice peaked at number two on the Korean Gaon Album Chart, while in Japan it reached number 24 on the Oricon chart, selling 4,768 copies in its first week of release.

== Track listing ==
Voice track listing
No.	Title	Lyrics	Music	Arrangement	Length
1.	"Blue"	Kenzie	Rocoberry	Rocoberry	3:30
2.	"Your Scent" (Korean: 거리마다; RR: Georimada; lit. 'Every Street')	Rocoberry	Conan	Conan	3:25
3.	"Under the Starlight" (Korean: 동네; RR: Dongne; lit. 'Neighborhood')	ZigZag Note; Lee Shin-sung	ZigZag Note; Kim Sun-woong	ZigZag Note; Kim Sun-woong	4:07
4.	"Sign" (Korean: 어떤 사이; RR: Eotteon sai; lit. 'What Kind of Relationship')	MonoTree	MonoTree	MonoTree	3:09
5.	"Illusion" (Korean: 사랑이었을까; RR: Sarangieosseulkka; lit. 'Was It Love')	Onew; Roco	Conan	Conan	4:14
6.	"Shine on You" (Korean: 온유하게 해요; RR: Onyuhage haeyo; lit. 'Make It Gentle')	Onew	Conan	Conan	2:54
7.	"Timepiece" (Korean: 또각또각; RR: Ttogakttogak; lit. 'Tap Tap')	Won Tae-yeon; Jaeha	Cho Kyu-man	Cho Kyu-man	4:59
Total length:					26:38

== Charts ==
Chart performance for Voice
Chart (2018)	Peak position
French Digital Albums (SNEP)	125
Japanese Albums (Oricon)	24
Japanese Hot Albums (Billboard Japan)	9
South Korean Albums (Gaon)	2
US Heatseekers Albums (Billboard)	21
US World Albums (Billboard)	8
