= High Class (TV series) =

2021 South Korean television series

- Promotional poster
- Also known as: High-class
- Hangul: 하이클래스
- RR: Hai keullaeseu
- MR: Hai k'ŭllaesŭ
- Genre: Mystery; Suspense; Drama
- Created by: Kim Ji-hyeon (tvN)
- Developed by: Studio Dragon
- Directed by: Choi Byeong-gil
- Starring: Cho Yeo-jeong; Kim Ji-soo; Kim Young-jae
- Music by: Kenzie & Yi Na-il
- Country of origin: South Korea
- Original language: Korean
- No. of episodes: 16

Production
- Executive producer: Kim Geon-hong
- Producers: Jeong Se-ryeong; Hwang Chang-woo; Cho Hye-rin
- Camera setup: Single-camera
- Running time: 70 minutes
- Production companies: Production H; H World Pictures

Original release
- Network: tvN
- Release: September 6 – November 1, 2021

High Class (Korean: 하이클래스) is a 2021 South Korean television series directed by Choi Byeong-gil and starring Cho Yeo-jeong, Kim Ji-soo and Kim Young-jae. The series depicts the lies, secret, mystery, suspense and hypocrisy hidden behind the perfect lives of South Korea's top 0.1% women. It premiered on tvN on September 6, 2021, and aired every Monday and Tuesday at 22:30 (KST) till November 1. The series is available on IQIYI for streaming in selected locations.

The series ended with highest rating of 5.7% for the final episode as per Nielsen Korea.

== Synopsis ==
It is about the fibs and hypocrisies hidden behind the perfect lives of the women who live in the top 0.1 percent bracket of the society. It builds the suspense and mystery around those who live it.

Song Yeo-ul (Cho Yeo-jeong) is framed for her husband's murder and she loses everything. Nam Ji-seon (Kim Ji-soo) is the star among the mothers at the international school where the children of elite go. Danny (Ha Jun), a former ice hockey player is a teacher at the school. Hwang Na-yoon (Park Se-jin), a single mother who is the only one friendly to Song Yeo-ul. Cha Do-yeong (Gong Hyun-joo), a washed-out actress follows Nam Ji-seon around because she wants to be in the limelight.

== Cast ==
=== Main ===
- Cho Yeo-jeong as Song Yeo-ul, in late 30s, a former lawyer. She was suspected of being the murderer in her husband's disappearance as her husband went missing during a trip on a yacht with only her being on the yacht with him all night.
- Kim Ji-soo as Nam Ji-seon,

Hotel Locanda President & CEO, HSC International School PTA Parent Representative, she controls public opinion at the international school

- Park Se-jin as Hwang Na-yoon, a single mom

Song Yeo-ul's the only friend and CEO of J&Y Gallery. It is known that Hwang Na-yoon returned from Hong Kong with a daughter without a husband. But she did not reveal her true feelings.

- Gong Hyun-joo as Cha Do-yeong

A top actress turned celebrity, a former Miss Korea. She clings to Ji-seon and tries to become a real celebrity like her. She runs Salon de 愛, a restaurant jointly with star chef Jung Mi-do

- Ha Jun as Danny Oh/Oh Soon-sang, an ice hockey player-turned-teacher. He is very sweet and caring to Song Yeo Wool. He coaches Song's son despite the opposition of other mums.

=== Supporting ===
==== People around Song Yeo-ul ====
- Jang Sun-yool as Ahn Yi-chan, 8 year old, Yeo-ul's son

==== People around Nam Ji-seon ====
- Kim Young-jae as Lee Jeong-woo, in early 40s

Nam Ji-seon's second husband who is a famous cosmetics surgeon in Gangnam

- Kim Ji-yoo as Lee Jun-hee, 8-year-old daughter of Nam Ji-seon
- Choi Bo-geun as Lee Jun-mo, age 16

Nam Ji-seon's son, HSC International School, in G 9

- Lee Chae-min as Ahn Seung-jo, assistant to Nam Ji-seon

==== People around Hwang Na-yoon ====
- Park So-yi as Hwang Jae-in, 8 years old

Na-yoon Hwang's daughter, HSC International School in G1

==== People around Cha Do-yeong ====
- Choi Sung-joon as Kwak Sang-geon

A chaebol from the third generation of ventures. He is married to Cha Do-young. They were a star couple once but now are just a show couple.

- Seo Yun-hyuk as Kwak Shi-woo, 8 years old

Kwak Sang-geon and Do-yeong's son, HSC International School in G1

- Kim Jin-yeop as Jung Mi-do in mid 30s

Restaurant Salon de 愛 co-owner and star chef

==== HSC International School ====
- Woo Hyun-joo as Do Jin-seol, the president of the International School Foundation
- Yoon In-jo as Bang Young-joo, a media group voice actor and media wife
- Kang Kang-jung as Seong-kyung-ah

The youngest member of a group, her husband is a member of the National Assembly. She is first-year parent at HSC International School.

- Lee Jeong-Yeol as Han Geon-Young in late 50s

Head of HSC International School

- Lee Ga-eun as Rachel Cho, a Canadian-born HSC International School teacher
- Kim Seong-tae as Alex Comer in 30s

Director of Finance, HSC International Schools Foundation

=== Others ===
- Kwon Hyuk as Ku Young-ho

police detective who confronts Song Yeo-ul.

- Seo Jeong-yeon as Shim Ae-soon, a maid for VIP-only townhouses

=== Special appearance ===
- Kim Nam-hee as Ahn Ji-yong

Song Yeo-ul's deceased husband and the representative of an asset management company. He was a loving husband and father. However, he disappeared and died in a mysterious yacht accident and made Song Yeo-wool fall into a nightmare-like reality as she begins to uncover the secrets he was hiding related to his death.

- Park Eun-hye as 'Sejun-mam'

She fires the signal of the conflict over Song Yeo-ul in the international school (Ep.1)

== Production ==
On March 11, 2021, tvN confirmed that Cho Yeo-jeong, Kim Ji-soo, Ha Joon, Park Se-jin, and Kong Hyun-joo will be appearing in the drama High-class. Later in March Kim Young-jae, Lee Ga-eun, Lee Chae-min and Kim Ji-yoo joined the cast. On July 28, the script reading site was revealed.

=== Filming ===
On June 9, 2021, Gong Hyun-joo posted photos from the filming of the drama.

== Original soundtrack ==
High Class

Soundtrack album by Various
- Released: 2021
- Genre: Soundtrack
- Languages: Korean; English
- Labels: Genie Music; Stone Music Entertainment

=== Part 1 ===
Released on September 14, 2021
No.	Title	Lyrics	Music	Artist	Length
1.	"Dawn"	Ruach	Ruach	Paige	3:34
2.	"Dawn" (Inst.)		Ruach		3:34

=== Part 2 ===
Released on September 21, 2021
No.	Title	Lyrics	Music	Artist	Length
1.	"Ready For Your Love"	Kenzie	Kenzie	Kriz	3:20
2.	"Ready For Your Love" (Inst.)				3:20

=== Part 3 ===
Released on October 5, 2021
No.	Title	Lyrics	Music	Artist	Length
1.	"Blue"	KENZIE, Lee In- il	KENZIE, Lee In- il	Onew, Elaine	3:51
2.	"Blue" (Inst.)		KENZIE, Lee In- il		3:51

=== Part 4 ===
Released on October 11, 2021
No.	Title	Lyrics	Music	Artist	Length
1.	"Stay Alive"	December 32, Ruid (Llwyd)	Kim Tae-young, Sung Hyun-taek	Suran	3:08
2.	"Stay Alive" (Inst.)		Kim Tae-young, Sung Hyun-taek		3:08

== Viewership ==
High Class : South Korea viewers per episode (thousands)

Season	Episode number																Average
Season	1	2	3	4	5	6	7	8	9	10	11	12	13	14	15	16	Average
1	718	757	748	932	650	869	903	892	1001	1034	1035	851	1025	1012	1075	1155	916

Source: Audience measurement performed nationwide by Nielsen Korea

Average TV viewership ratings
Ep.	Original broadcast date	Average audience share (Nielsen Korea)	
Ep.	Original broadcast date	Nationwide	Seoul
1	September 6, 2021	3.221% (1st)	3.445% (1st)
2	September 7, 2021	3.379% (2nd)	3.437% (2nd)
3	September 13, 2021	3.342% (1st)	3.286% (1st)
4	September 14, 2021	3.986% (1st)	4.295% (2nd)
5	September 20, 2021	2.953% (1st)	3.195% (1st)
6	September 21, 2021	3.856% (1st)	4.171% (1st)
7	September 27, 2021	4.193% (1st)	4.604% (1st)
8	September 28, 2021	4.489% (1st)	4.983% (1st)
9	October 4, 2021	4.376% (1st)	4.283% (1st)
10	October 5, 2021	4.924% (1st)	4.859% (1st)
11	October 11, 2021	4.832% (1st)	5.192% (1st)
12	October 18, 2021 (Note: The 12th episode was not aired on October 12, due to broadcast of the Qatar World Cup final qualifier match between Korea and Iran.)	4.254% (1st)	4.732% (1st)
13	October 19, 2021	4.922% (1st)	4.693% (1st)
14	October 25, 2021	4.792% (1st)	4.911% (1st)
15	October 26, 2021	5.079% (1st)	4.824% (1st)
16	November 1, 2021	5.700% (1st)	5.781% (1st)
Average		4.269%	4.418%
In the table above, the blue numbers represent the lowest ratings and the red numbers represent the highest ratings.; This drama airs on a cable channel/pay TV which normally has a relatively smaller audience compared to free-to-air TV/public broadcasters (KBS, SBS, MBC and EBS).
