= Life Goes On (Onew album) =

- Digital/regular cover

Studio album by Onew
- Released: July 6, 2022
- Studios: Ingrid (Seoul); Onkio Haus (Tokyo); SM SSAM (Seoul); SM Starlight (Seoul); SM Yellow Tail (Seoul)
- Genre: J-pop
- Length: 45:05
- Language: Japanese
- Labels: EMI; UMJ
- Producers: Kim Dong-woo; Naoshi Fujikura

Onew chronology
Dice (2022)	Life Goes On (2022)	Circle (2023)

Singles from Life Goes On
- 1. "Kirakira" Released: May 18, 2022; 2. "Uroko" Released: May 25, 2022; 3. "Life Goes On" Released: June 22, 2022

Life Goes On is the debut Japanese studio album by South Korean singer Onew. It was physically released on July 6, 2022, through EMI Records. The album consists of two parts, Who Sings? Vol.1 and Life Goes On, which were digitally released on June 1, 2022, and June 29, 2022, respectively. It contains ten tracks, including six original songs and four covers, with the lead single "Life Goes On".

== Background and release ==
Onew released his second EP in April 2022 after taking a four-year hiatus from his solo music career due to military service. Following this, it was announced that he would release his first Japanese album in July, accompanied by his first Japan concert tour as a soloist.

The album contains two discs; the first disc includes six original songs, while the second includes four covers of famous Japanese songs. The bonus disc was released as a digital EP titled Who Sings? Vol.1 on June 1. The songs included are "Everything" by Misia, "Kirakira" by Kazumasa Oda, "Uroko" by Motohiro Hata and "Yasashii Kiss o Shite" by Dreams Come True. "Kirakira" and "Uroko" were released on digital music platforms on May 18 and May 25, respectively. The music video for "Kirakira" stars Rena Takeda and Jin Suzuki and showcases a story about everyday life. The album's title song "Life Goes On" was pre-released on June 22. The album's second disc was digitally released on June 29. The full studio album was released physically on July 6 along with the music video of the title track. It stars Hinako Sakurai and was shot in Okinawa.

== Promotion ==
To commemorate the album's release, Onew held a talk event in collaboration with J-Wave in front of 400 fans, where he discussed the production process. He hosted the July 7 episode of All Night Nippon. Onew embarked on his first Japanese concert tour on July 8 in support of the album. A reality show depicting his album preparations titled Hello Onew was broadcast by Fuji TV starting on July 11. He collaborated with YouTuber and vocal coach Ryo Shiraishi, appearing on his YouTube channel to discuss his singing techniques and album. He also guested on the longest-running Japanese music show, Music Fair, and music program Buzz Rhythm.

== Commercial performance ==
Following their digital releases, both Who Sings? Vol.1 and Life Goes On topped Oricon's weekly Digital Albums Chart. Both albums peaked at number four on the Billboard Japan Hot Albums chart and topped the component Download Albums chart, recording 3,254 and 2,108 downloads, respectively. With its physical release, Life Goes On recorded 30,299 copies in first week sales.

== Track listing ==
Life Goes On track listing
No.	Title	Lyrics	Music	Length
1.	"Yoake no Sekai" (夜明けの世界)	Tanaka	Josef Melin	4:38
2.	"Osoku Okita Asa ni" (遅く起きた朝に)	Junji Ishiwatari	Kyosuke Yamanaka; Erik Lidbom	5:57
3.	"Life Is..."	Sayaka Inoue	Michael James Down; Primož Poglajen; Jeppe Reil; Thomas Reil	3:06
4.	"Beauty"	Ishiwatari	David Simon; Alysa; Carlyle Fernandes	3:24
5.	"Lighthouse"	Sara Sakurai	Andreas Stone Johansson; Ricky Hanley; Russ Ballard; Christian Ballard	4:09
6.	"Life Goes On"	Sakurai	Justin Reinstein	3:20
Total length:				24:34

Who Sings? Vol.1 track listing
No.	Title	Lyrics	Music	Arrangement	Length
1.	"Everything"	Misia	Toshiaki Matsumoto	Tomoki Ishizuka	6:54
2.	"Kirakira" (キラキラ)	Kazumasa Oda	Oda	Hirofumi Sasaki	4:53
3.	"Uroko" (鱗(うろこ))	Motohiro Hata	Hata	Haketa Takefumi	5:17
4.	"Yasashii Kiss o Shite" (やさしいキスをして)	Miwa Yoshida	Masato Nakamura	Takefumi	3:27
Total length:					20:31

== Charts ==
=== Weekly charts ===
Chart performance for Life Goes On
Chart (2022)	Peak position
Japanese Albums (Oricon)	2
Japanese Hot Albums (Billboard Japan)	4

Chart performance for Who Sings? Vol. 1
Chart (2022)	Peak position
Japanese Hot Albums (Billboard Japan)	4

=== Monthly charts ===
Monthly chart performance for Life Goes On
Chart (2022)	Peak position
Japanese Albums (Oricon)	16

=== Year-end charts ===
Year-end chart performance for Life Goes On
Chart (2022)	Position
Japanese Hot Albums (Billboard Japan)	97

Year-end chart performance for Who Sings? Vol. 1
Chart (2022)	Position
Japanese Download Albums (Billboard Japan)	41

== Release history ==
Release dates and formats for Life Goes On
Region	Date	Format	Edition	Label	Ref.
Various	June 1, 2022	Digital download; streaming	Who Sings? Vol.1	EMI	
Various	June 29, 2022	Digital download; streaming	Life Goes On	EMI	
Japan	July 6, 2022	CD; Blu-ray	Life Goes On	EMI	
