= Circle (Onew album) =

- Digital cover

Studio album by Onew
- Released: March 6, 2023
- Studios: SM Big Shot (Seoul); SM LVYIN (Seoul); SM SSAM (Seoul); SM Starlight (Seoul); SM Yellow Tail (Seoul)
- Genres: Pop; R&B
- Length: 31:52
- Language: Korean
- Labels: SM; Dreamus

Onew chronology
Life Goes On (2022)	Circle (2023)	Flow (2024)

Singles from Circle
- 1. "O (Circle)" Released: March 6, 2023

Circle is the first Korean-language studio album (second overall) by South Korean singer Onew. It was released on March 6, 2023, through SM Entertainment. The album contains ten songs, including the lead single, "O (Circle)". It peaked at number three on South Korea's Circle Album Chart.

== Background ==
Circle was Onew's first Korean release after almost a year, following on from his 2022 EP Dice. In the interim, he released the Japanese-language studio album Life Goes On and embarked on a tour across Japan. Onew originally heard "O (Circle)" before Dice came out, but decided to save it for a future release, believing it to be "too strong" at the time. Kim Eana wrote the lyrics according to his ideas. Onew had previously collaborated with her on his 2021 song "Way", which the two wrote together. He was involved in the production process from beginning to end, undergoing multiple rounds of recording, mixing and mastering, despite struggling with health issues. He noted, "I don't think there was a single part of the entire process that I didn't touch". Onew chose the keywords "healing", "recovery" and "circulation" to describe the album. He stated that he wanted to "broaden the spectrum" of his music and described it as a "stepping stone" for his future work.

== Composition ==
The songs are arranged to give the feeling of watching a single performance. Lead single "O (Circle)" is an R&B song that combines arpeggio synth sounds with a heavy bass line. The lyrics, written by Kim Eana, compare the circular nature of life to the passing of the seasons. The title was chosen by Onew. "Cough" is a pop song that uses acoustic guitar and drum lines to create a lonely atmosphere. It depicts the longing that ensues following a break-up, like a cold that refuses to go away at the change of the season. "Rain on Me" is a ballad with a lyrical melody and acoustic band sound. The second half of the song features layered strings, and the lyrics take the form of a monologue in which Onew describes the person he wants to see in the rain. "Caramel" features rapper Giriboy and is a jazz pop song that likens love to the sweetness of caramel. It contains piano, bass, trumpets and scat singing. "Anywhere" is a pop song with keyboard, bass and synth sounds, sung in falsetto. "Paradise" is a pop song with light guitar riffs and synths. The lyrics describe the sensation of falling in love as feeling like the stars are pouring down. Midtempo pop song "Expectations" has a danceable beat created by electric guitar, a rhythmic drum line and synths. It compares feelings of disappointment and expectation in love to a battery that is continually recharged and drained. "No Parachute" is an indie pop song about jumping into unfamiliar situations, containing a strong drum rhythm and synths. "Walk With You" is a midtempo pop song with a nostalgic theme. "Always" is an "emotional" ballad expressing Onew's desire to stay by the subject's side during times of difficulty and provide comfort.

== Release and promotion ==
The album was announced on February 20, 2023, with pre-orders beginning the same day. Promotional materials, including teaser images and videos, were shared in the lead-up to its March 6 release. Onew held a series of concerts, titled O-New-Note, at the Olympic Hall in Seoul on March 3–5, 2023, which was followed by further concerts in Tokyo on March 14–15. He premiered songs from the album, including the lead single, at the concerts.

== Critical reception ==
Year-end lists for Circle
Critic/Publication	List	Rank	Ref.
Billboard	The 25 Best K-Pop Albums of 2023	1	

== Track listing ==
Circle track listing
No.	Title	Lyrics	Music	Arrangement	Length
1.	"O (Circle)"	Kim Eana	Haris	Haris	3:17
2.	"Cough" (환절기; Hwanjeolgi; lit. 'Change of Seasons')	Danke (Lalala Studio)	Alma Goodman; Jake Torrey; Todd Spadafore	Spadafore	3:04
3.	"Rain on Me" (우중산책; Ujungsanchaek; lit. 'A Walk in the Rain')	Tomboy1	Jisoo Park (153/Joombas); Sam Kim	MRey (153CreatorsClub); Sam Kim; Park	3:48
4.	"Caramel" (featuring Giriboy)	Park; Giriboy	Park; Bendik Møller; Giriboy	Møller; Park	3:11
5.	"Anywhere"	Kim Min-ji (Jam Factory)	Ryan Bickley; Andrea Rosario; Fridolin Walchin	Freedo	3:02
6.	"Paradise"	Danke	Paul Meehan; Kjetil Mørland; Etham Basden; Hautboi Rich	Meehan; Mørland	3:12
7.	"Expectations"	Kang Eun-jung	Jordy Shulman; Jonny Shorr; Will Jay; Matthew Crawford; Aaron Theodore Berton	Theo & The Climb	3:12
8.	"No Parachute"	Jeon Ji-eun (Lalala Studio)	Liam Geddes; Talk Like Tigers	Geddes	2:48
9.	"Walk with You" (기억을 걷다; Gieogeul Geotda; lit. 'Walking Through Memories')	Mola	James Birt; Nermin Harambasic (Dsign Music); Isac Elliot; Britt Pols	Birt	3:14
10.	"Always" (보통의 밤; Botongui Bam; lit. 'An Ordinary Night')	Lee Yeong-seok (PNP)	Ju Chan-yang (Pollen); Lavin	Ju; Lavin	2:58
Total length:					31:52

== Personnel ==
- Onew – vocals, background vocals
- minGtion – vocal directing (tracks 1, 7–9)
- Heritage (Kim Hyo-sik, Lee Sin-hui, Park Ui-yeong) – background vocals (track 1)
- Lee Min-gyu – recording (tracks 1, 4, 7), digital editing (tracks 1, 4, 7), mixing (tracks 4, 7)
- Nam Gung-jin – mixing (track 1)
- Ju Chan-yang – vocal directing (tracks 2, 5, 10), background vocals (tracks 2, 6, 10)
- Lee Ji-hong – recording (tracks 2, 10), digital editing (tracks 2, 10), mixing (track 10)
- Jeong Eui-seok – mixing (tracks 2, 5)
- Kim Yeon-seo – vocal directing (tracks 3–4, 6)
- Jeong Yu-ra – recording (tracks 3, 8–9), digital editing (tracks 3, 8–9), mixing (tracks 3, 9)
- Giriboy – vocals (track 4), background vocals (track 4)
- Jisoo Park – background vocals (track 4)
- Ryan Bickley – background vocals (track 5)
- Kang Eun-ji – recording (tracks 5, 9), digital editing (track 5)
- No Min-ji – recording (track 6), digital editing (track 6)
- Kim Cheol-sun – mixing (track 6)
- Liam Geddes – background vocals (track 8)
- Gu Jong-pil – mixing (track 8)
- Isac Elliott – background vocals (track 9)
- Nermin Harambasic – background vocals (track 9)
- Oiaisle – background vocals (track 9)
- Kwon Nam-woo – mastering

== Charts ==
=== Weekly charts ===
Chart performance for Circle
Chart (2023)	Peak position
Japanese Albums (Oricon)	11
Japanese Combined Albums (Oricon)	17
Japanese Hot Albums (Billboard Japan)	10
South Korean Albums (Circle)	3
UK Album Downloads (Official Charts)	98

=== Monthly charts ===
Monthly chart performance for Circle
Chart (2023)	Peak position
Japanese Albums (Oricon)	46
South Korean Albums (Circle)	11

== Accolades ==
Music program awards
Song	Program	Date	Ref.
"O (Circle)"	Show! Music Core	March 18, 2023	
