= Midnight Sun (musical) =

South Korean musical

- Music: Han Bo-ram
- Lyrics: Kim Han-sol
- Setting: South Korea, present day
- Basis: A Song to the Sun
- Premiere: May 1, 2021: Kwanglim Arts Center, Seoul, South Korea

Midnight Sun (태양의 노래; Tae-yang-ui norae; lit. "Song of the Sun") is a South Korean musical produced by Shinswave in 2021, based on the 2006 Japanese movie A Song to the Sun.

== History ==
Midnight Sun is the second Korean musical adaptation of Japanese movie A Song to the Sun after the one staged in 2010. The musical is produced by Shin Jung-hwa and Son Hyuk-il; it's directed by Kim Ji-ho, with musics composed by Han Bo-ram and Kim Han-sol, who is also lyricist.

Production company Shinswave announced Midnight Sun in early March 2021 by revealing the casting of Shinee's Onew, Day6's Wonpil, Got7's Youngjae and Cho Hun for the male lead role of Haram, Kang Hye-in, Lovelyz's Kei and Lee Ah-jin for the female lead role of Haena, and Kim Ju-ho and Jung Eui-uk as Haena's father. Nu'est's Baekho as Haram was cast on March 30.

The musical debuted on May 1, 2021 at the BBHC Hall of Kwanglim Arts Center in Seoul, and ended on July 25, with a limited number of people in the audience due to social distancing norms. The whole show was also aired worldwide in 147 countries through the online live streaming platform MetaTheater, with English and Japanese subtitles, with the help of seven cameras.

In addition, Midnight Sun was live screened in South Korean cinemas on May 7 by CJ CGV in 29 theaters nationwide, as the tickets for the offline performance were sold out as soon as they went on sale. The same show was live broadcast in 15 movie theaters in Indonesia, 4 in Taiwan, 3 in Hong Kong, and 2 in Singapore. The two shows scheduled for May 9 were also screened in 20 movie theaters in Indonesia, 4 in Taiwan, 3 in Hong Kong, and 2 in Singapore, bringing the total live screenings across the five countries to 82. A total of seven performances were live screened abroad, while additional screenings were held in Korea at 20 cinemas on June 17 and 18.

Eighteen shows were made available as VOD on MetaTheater in August.

It returned to the stage from May 3 to June 26, 2022, at the KEPCO Art Center in Seoul and simultaneously in streaming on MetaTheater. It was also broadcast in four cinemas of the CGV chain every Saturday. The musical debuted in Japan for eight performances from 27 to 30 July 2022 at NHK Osaka Hall.

== Synopsis ==
Seo Haena is a girl who has to avoid the sun due to a rare disease called xeroderma pigmentosum, therefore she's only active at night, when she's used to go busking at the train station with her guitar. From her bedroom's window, every day Haena sees a high school boy with a surfboard with his friends. Haena is intrigued by him and, one night, while she's singing and playing the guitar outside, she sees him passing by, therefore she follows him and clumsily introduces herself. Noting that the boy wears the same school uniform as her, Haena's friend Bom offers to spy on him, and discovers his name is Jung Haram.

The next evening, Haena sits on a bench at the train station, and Haram arrives with his surfboard. Both embarrassed, they start talking, with Haram eventually promising to meet her and listen to her sing the next night. When they meet up, another street performer has occupied Haena's spot, so Haram takes her to a square, where a crowd gathers to hear her sing and play the guitar. Afterwards, they share their dreams about the future while watching the sea, and Haram asks her out.

Their date ends abruptly as the sun breaks and Haena rushes back home: Haram is therefore informed of her condition and, although initially taken aback, starts reading medical books to better understand. For a while, Haena stubbornly refuses to see him, while Haram takes up small jobs and sells his surfboard to pay for a recording studio where she could record her debut single. One night, Haena's father, out of concern, invites Haram over for dinner, and the boy reveals his plans for Haena's CD. As they walk home that night, the two begin to talk, and Haena slowly realizes how much Haram truly cares for her.

As her medical condition begins to worsen, the girl loses feeling in her hands, and is unable to play the guitar. Meanwhile, Haena and Haram enjoys their time together, going on dates like an ordinary couple, and she assures him that she still has her voice and wants to sing for him. In the studio, Haena asks her father and friends to leave and wait for the CD to hear her song.

Some time later, as promised, Haram brings Haena to the beach to watch him surf. She is in a wheelchair and wearing the protective suit she had left hanging for years. With a painful expression, her father tries to convince her that if she takes off the suit, she could run around freely, but she declines, saying she wants to live until the end. She then tells Haram about a place called Nordkapp in Norway where the sun never sets in summer, and about her wish to sing there one day under the midnight sun. While telling the story, Haena quietly dies.

Later on, Haram and Haena's friends and family listen to Haena's song, "Good-Bye Days", on the radio as it's finally released. With "Good-Bye Days" playing in his headphones, Haram goes to Nordkapp and meets Haena's ghost. The two hug promising to meet again underneath the sun so as not to be lonely, and be there for each other.

== Musical numbers ==
- "Prologue" – Haram, Noah, Hangyeol, Haena
- "Good Day" (좋은 하루) – All except Haena
- "Will My Day Ever Come?" (그런 날의 오게될까) – Haena
- "Such Beautiful Sunlight" (part 1) (이렇게 햇살이 예쁜데) – Junwoo
- "The Sun is in My Eyes" – Haram, Hangyeol, Noah
- "Will My Day Ever Come?" (reprise) (그런 날의 오게될까) – Haena
- "That Boy/That Girl" (part 1) (그 소년/그 소녀) – Bom, ensemble
- "That Boy/That Girl" (part 2) (그 소년/그 소녀) – Haram
- "Stranger in the Dark" – Dynamite
- "Milky Way Galaxy" – Haena, ensemble
- "A Melody Called You" (너라는 멜로디) – Haram, Haena
- "Such Beautiful Sunlight" (part 2) (이렇게 햇살이 예쁜데) – Junwoo, Bom
- "The Special You" (특별한 너) – Haram
- "Your Mystery" (part 1) – Hangyeol, Noah, Bom
- "Your Mystery" (part 2) – Hangyeol, Noah, Bom
- "Meet Me When the Sun Goes Down" (태양이지면 널 만나러 갈게) – Haram
- "Surprise/First Date" – Haram, Haena, Bom, Noah, Hangyeol, ensemble
- "How Did It Become Like This" (어떻게 이렇게 되어 버린 걸까) – Junwoo
- "Even If This Song Ends Someday" (이 노래가 언젠가 끝난다 해도) – All
- "Good-Bye Days" (part 2) – Haena
- "That Place, Nordkapp" (그곳, 노르카프) – All
- "Good-Bye Days" (part 3) – All except Haena
- "Meet Me When the Sun Goes Down" (reprise) (태양 아래서 널 만나러 갈게) – Haram, Haena

== Cast ==
=== 2021 season ===
- Jung Haram – Onew, Wonpil, Baekho, Cho Hun, Youngjae
- Seo Haena – Kang Hye-in, Kei, Lee Ah-jin
- Seo Junwoo – Kim Ju-ho, Jung Eui-uk
- Lee Bom – Jung Da-ye, Joo Da-on
- Park Noah – Lee Chan-ryeol, Shin Eun-chong
- Kang Hangyeol – Shin Eun-chong, Kim Kyung-rok
- Haena's doctor – Namgoong Hye-in, Kim Ha-na
- Ensemble – Park Sang-joon, Shin Dong-min, Ryu Han-saem, Cho Hyun-jin, Han Ga-ram

=== 2022 season ===
- Jung Haram – Onew, Ha Sung-woon, Jinho, Song Geon-hee, Y
- Seo Haena – Kim Nam-joo, Lee Sang-ah, Kwon Eun-bi
- Seo Junwoo – Kim Ju-ho, Wang Shin-ming
- Lee Bom – Jung Da-ye, Joo Da-on
- Park Noah – Lee Chan-ryeol, Jo Won-seok
- Kang Hangyeol – Kim Kyung-rok, Kim Ji-ung
- Haena's doctor – Kim Ha-na
- Ensemble – Lim Ha-ram, Kim Min-su, Choi Kyung-rok, Yoo Hee-ji, Shin Hye-min, Heo Ji-yeon

== Shows ==
=== 2021 season ===
On June 26 and July 3, Kei couldn't perform due to self-quarantine after Lovelyz' Seo Ji-soo tested positive for COVID-19, and was replaced by Kang Hye-in.

The performances initially scheduled for the evenings of July 18, 21 and 22 were cancelled due to new authorities guidelines about social distancing, which restricted gatherings of more than two people after 6 PM, bringing the number of shows to 95.

Shows list

Shows available as VOD

#	Shows	Jung Haram					Seo Haena			Seo Jungwoo		Lee Bom		Park Noah		Kang Hangyeol	
#	Shows	Onew	Wonpil	Baekho	Cho Hun	Youngjae	Kang Hye-in	Kei	Lee Ah-jin	Kim Ju-ho	Jung Eui-uk	Jung Da-ye	Joo Da-on	Lee Chan-ryeol	Shin Eun-chong	Shin Eun-chong	Kim Kyung-rok
1	May 1 (6:30 PM)		Yes						Yes	Yes			Yes	Yes			Yes
2	May 2 (2:00 PM)					Yes	Yes				Yes	Yes		Yes		Yes	
3	May 2 (6:30 PM)		Yes					Yes		Yes			Yes	Yes			Yes
4	May 4 (7:30 PM)				Yes			Yes			Yes	Yes			Yes		Yes
5	May 5 (2:00 PM)					Yes	Yes			Yes			Yes	Yes			Yes
6	May 5 (6:30 PM)	Yes							Yes		Yes	Yes			Yes		Yes
7	May 6 (7:30 PM)		Yes						Yes	Yes			Yes	Yes		Yes	
8	May 7 (7:30 PM)	Yes						Yes		Yes		Yes		Yes			Yes
9	May 8 (2:00 PM)					Yes	Yes				Yes		Yes	Yes			Yes
10	May 8 (6:30 PM)		Yes						Yes		Yes	Yes			Yes		Yes
11	May 9 (2:00 PM)					Yes		Yes		Yes			Yes	Yes			Yes
12	May 9 (6:30 PM)		Yes						Yes	Yes		Yes		Yes		Yes	
13	May 11 (7:30 PM)					Yes	Yes			Yes			Yes	Yes		Yes	
14	May 12 (7:30 PM)	Yes						Yes		Yes		Yes		Yes		Yes	
15	May 13 (7:30 PM)		Yes						Yes		Yes	Yes		Yes			Yes
16	May 14 (7:30 PM)	Yes							Yes	Yes			Yes		Yes		Yes
17	May 15 (2:00 PM)		Yes					Yes		Yes		Yes			Yes		Yes
18	May 15 (6:30 PM)					Yes	Yes			Yes			Yes	Yes			Yes
19	May 16 (2:00 PM)				Yes			Yes			Yes	Yes			Yes		Yes
20	May 16 (6:30 PM)	Yes							Yes		Yes		Yes	Yes			Yes
21	May 18 (7:30 PM)					Yes	Yes			Yes		Yes		Yes		Yes	
22	May 19 (2:30 PM)		Yes					Yes		Yes			Yes	Yes			Yes
23	May 19 (6:30 PM)	Yes							Yes		Yes	Yes			Yes		Yes
24	May 20 (7:30 PM)					Yes	Yes				Yes		Yes	Yes			Yes
25	May 21 (7:30 PM)	Yes							Yes	Yes		Yes		Yes		Yes	
26	May 22 (2:00 PM)			Yes			Yes				Yes		Yes	Yes		Yes	
27	May 22 (6:30 PM)		Yes						Yes		Yes	Yes		Yes			Yes
28	May 23 (2:00 PM)					Yes	Yes			Yes			Yes		Yes		Yes
29	May 23 (6:30 PM)			Yes					Yes	Yes		Yes		Yes			Yes
30	May 25 (7:30 PM)		Yes					Yes			Yes	Yes		Yes			Yes
31	May 26 (7:30 PM)			Yes			Yes				Yes		Yes		Yes		Yes
32	May 27 (7:30 PM)		Yes						Yes	Yes		Yes			Yes		Yes
33	May 28 (7:30 PM)					Yes	Yes			Yes			Yes	Yes			Yes
34	May 29 (2:00 PM)			Yes					Yes		Yes	Yes		Yes		Yes	
35	May 29 (6:30 PM)					Yes		Yes			Yes		Yes	Yes		Yes	
36	May 30 (2:00 PM)			Yes					Yes	Yes		Yes		Yes			Yes
37	May 30 (6:30 PM)				Yes		Yes			Yes			Yes		Yes		Yes
38	June 1 (7:30 PM)		Yes				Yes				Yes	Yes			Yes		Yes
39	June 2 (7:30 PM)			Yes					Yes		Yes		Yes	Yes		Yes	
40	June 3 (7:30 PM)				Yes			Yes		Yes			Yes	Yes			Yes
41	June 4 (7:30 PM)					Yes			Yes	Yes		Yes		Yes		Yes	
42	June 5 (2:00 PM)		Yes				Yes				Yes		Yes	Yes		Yes	
43	June 5 (6:30 PM)			Yes					Yes		Yes	Yes		Yes			Yes
44	June 6 (2:00 PM)					Yes	Yes			Yes			Yes		Yes		Yes
45	June 6 (6:30 PM)	Yes						Yes			Yes	Yes			Yes		Yes
46	June 8 (7:30 PM)				Yes			Yes		Yes			Yes	Yes			Yes
47	June 9 (7:30 PM)			Yes			Yes			Yes			Yes	Yes		Yes	
48	June 10 (7:30 PM)					Yes			Yes		Yes	Yes		Yes			Yes
49	June 11 (7:30 PM)		Yes						Yes	Yes			Yes		Yes		Yes
50	June 12 (2:00 PM)			Yes				Yes			Yes	Yes			Yes		Yes
51	June 12 (6:30 PM)					Yes	Yes				Yes	Yes			Yes		Yes
52	June 13 (2:00 PM)		Yes						Yes	Yes			Yes	Yes			Yes
53	June 13 (6:30 PM)	Yes					Yes			Yes			Yes	Yes		Yes	
54	June 15 (7:30 PM)			Yes			Yes				Yes		Yes		Yes		Yes
55	June 16 (7:30 PM)	—															
56	June 17 (7:30 PM)			Yes					Yes	Yes		Yes		Yes		Yes	
57	June 18 (7:30 PM)	Yes							Yes	Yes		Yes		Yes		Yes	
58	June 19 (2:00 PM)					Yes		Yes			Yes	Yes			Yes		Yes
59	June 19 (6:30 PM)		Yes				Yes				Yes	Yes			Yes		Yes
60	June 20 (2:00 PM)					Yes		Yes		Yes		Yes		Yes			Yes
61	June 20 (6:30 PM)	Yes					Yes			Yes		Yes		Yes		Yes	
62	June 22 (7:30 PM)	Yes							Yes	Yes			Yes	Yes			Yes
63	June 23 (7:30 PM)		Yes				Yes			Yes			Yes	Yes			Yes
64	June 24 (7:30 PM)			Yes			Yes				Yes		Yes	Yes			Yes
65	June 25 (7:30 PM)			Yes					Yes	Yes		Yes		Yes			Yes
66	June 26 (2:00 PM)					Yes	Yes				Yes		Yes	Yes			Yes
67	June 26 (6:30 PM)		Yes				Yes				Yes		Yes	Yes			Yes
68	June 27 (2:00 PM)			Yes			Yes			Yes		Yes		Yes			Yes
69	June 27 (6:30 PM)	Yes							Yes	Yes		Yes		Yes			Yes
70	June 29 (7:30 PM)		Yes				Yes				Yes		Yes	Yes			Yes
71	June 30 (7:30 PM)			Yes					Yes	Yes		Yes		Yes			Yes
72	July 1 (7:30 PM)	Yes					Yes			Yes			Yes	Yes			Yes
73	July 2 (7:30 PM)				Yes		Yes			Yes			Yes	Yes			Yes
74	July 3 (2:00 PM)			Yes			Yes			Yes		Yes		Yes			Yes
75	July 3 (6:30 PM)		Yes						Yes	Yes			Yes	Yes			Yes
76	July 4 (2:00 PM)					Yes	Yes				Yes	Yes		Yes			Yes
77	July 4 (6:30 PM)	Yes					Yes				Yes		Yes	Yes			Yes
78	July 7 (7:30 PM)	Yes					Yes				Yes		Yes	Yes			Yes
79	July 8 (7:30 PM)			Yes					Yes	Yes		Yes		Yes			Yes
80	July 9 (7:30 PM)	Yes						Yes		Yes			Yes	Yes			Yes
81	July 10 (2:00 PM)			Yes					Yes		Yes	Yes		Yes			Yes
82	July 10 (6:30 PM)					Yes		Yes		Yes			Yes	Yes			Yes
83	July 11 (2:00 PM)				Yes			Yes		Yes			Yes	Yes			Yes
84	July 11 (6:30 PM)	Yes					Yes			Yes		Yes		Yes			Yes
85	July 14 (7:30 PM)	Yes							Yes	Yes			Yes	Yes			Yes
86	July 15 (7:30 PM)			Yes					Yes		Yes	Yes		Yes			Yes
87	July 16 (7:30 PM)	Yes					Yes			Yes			Yes	Yes			Yes
88	July 17 (2:00 PM)			Yes					Yes		Yes	Yes		Yes			Yes
89	July 17 (6:30 PM)					Yes		Yes		Yes		Yes		Yes			Yes
90	July 18 (2:00 PM)			Yes			Yes			Yes			Yes	Yes			Yes
91	July 18 (6:30 PM)	Cancelled															
92	July 21 (7:30 PM)	Cancelled															
93	July 22 (7:30 PM)	Cancelled															
94	July 23 (7:30 PM)		Yes						Yes	Yes			Yes	Yes			Yes
95	July 24 (2:00 PM)			Yes				Yes		Yes		Yes		Yes			Yes
96	July 24 (6:30 PM)					Yes			Yes	Yes			Yes	Yes			Yes
97	July 25 (2:00 PM)		Yes				Yes			Yes			Yes	Yes			Yes
98	July 25 (6:30 PM)			Yes				Yes		Yes		Yes		Yes			Yes

== Original soundtrack ==
Throughout the musical run, "Meet Me When the Sun Goes Down", "Good-Bye Days" and "Will My Day Ever Come?" were released as digital singles.

Part 1

Released on April 9, 2021
No.	Title	Lyrics	Music	Artist	Length
1.	"Meet Me When the Sun Goes Down" (태양이 지면 널 만나러 갈게)	Kim Han-sol	Han Bo-ram	Youngjae (Got7)	3:25

Part 2

Released on April 26, 2021
No.	Title	Lyrics	Music	Artist	Length
1.	"Meet Me When the Sun Goes Down" (태양이 지면 널 만나러 갈게)	Kim Han-sol	Han Bo-ram	Wonpil (Day6)	3:25
2.	"Good-Bye Days"	Yui, Kim Han-sol	Yui	Wonpil (Day6), Kei (Lovelyz)	3:55

Part 3

Released on May 11, 2021
No.	Title	Lyrics	Music	Artist	Length
1.	"Meet Me When the Sun Goes Down" (태양이 지면 널 만나러 갈게)	Kim Han-sol	Han Bo-ram	Baekho (Nu'est)	3:25
2.	"Good-Bye Days"	Yui, Kim Han-sol	Yui	Baekho (Nu'est), Kei (Lovelyz)	3:55

Part 4

Released on May 25, 2021
No.	Title	Lyrics	Music	Artist	Length
1.	"Meet Me When the Sun Goes Down" (태양이 지면 널 만나러 갈게)	Kim Han-sol	Han Bo-ram	Onew (Shinee)	3:25
2.	"Good-Bye Days"	Yui, Kim Han-sol	Yui	Onew (Shinee), Kei (Lovelyz)	3:55

Part 5

Released on June 7, 2021
No.	Title	Lyrics	Music	Artist	Length
1.	"Will My Day Ever Come?" (그런 날의 오게될까)	Kim Han-sol	Han Bo-ram	Kei (Lovelyz)	2:53
2.	"Good-Bye Days"	Yui, Kim Han-sol	Yui	Kei (Lovelyz), Youngjae (Got7)	3:55

The musical numbers were then published in a CD album on August 25, 2021 in five versions, one for every idol involved in the musical (Onew, Wonpil, Baekho, Youngjae and Kei). Each version contains the live performances of the corresponding idol, plus the studio versions of "Meet Me When the Sun Goes Down" and "Good-Bye Days". For Kei's version, "Meet Me When the Sun Goes Down" is replaced by "Will My Day Ever Come?".

No.	Title	Length
1.	"Good Day" (좋은 하루)	2:24
2.	"Will My Day Ever Come?" (그런 날의 오게될까)	1:38
3.	"The Sun is in My Eyes"	2:33
4.	"Will My Day Ever Come? (reprise)" (그런 날의 오게될까)	1:31
5.	"That Boy/That Girl (part 1)" (그 소년/그 소녀)	3:01
6.	"That Boy/That Girl (part 2)" (그 소년/그 소녀)	1:28
7.	"Stranger in the Dark"	2:59
8.	"Milky Way Galaxy"	2:34
9.	"A Melody Called You" (너라는 멜로디)	3:49
10.	"Such Beautiful Sunlight" (이렇게 햇살이 예쁜데)	3:28
11.	"The Special You" (특별한 너)	2:21
12.	"Your Mystery (part 1)"	1:34
13.	"Your Mystery (part 2)"	1:04
14.	"Meet Me When the Sun Goes Down" (태양이지면 널 만나러 갈게)	4:18
15.	"Surprise/First Date"	2:49
16.	"How Did It Become Like This" (어떻게 이렇게 되어 버린 걸까)	2:41
17.	"Even If This Song Ends Someday" (이 노래가 언젠가 끝난다 해도)	7:09
18.	"Good-Bye Days (part 1)"	2:03
19.	"That Place, Nordkapp" (그곳, 노르카프)	3:47
20.	"Good-Bye Days (part 2)"	3:28
21.	"Meet Me When the Sun Goes Down (Note: Duet.)" (태양 아래서 널 만나러 갈게)	2:23
22.	"Meet Me When the Sun Goes Down (Studio ver.)" (태양 아래서 널 만나러 갈게)	3:25
23.	"Good-Bye Days (Studio ver.)"	3:54

=== Chart performance ===
Title	Album details	Peak chart position	Sales
Title	Album details	KOR	Sales
Midnight Sun OST (Onew ver.)	Released: August 25, 2021; Label: Universal Music; Formats: CD, digital download	23	KOR: 4,874+
Midnight Sun OST (Wonpil ver.)	Released: August 25, 2021; Label: Universal Music; Formats: CD, digital download	45	—
Midnight Sun OST (Baekho ver.)	Released: August 25, 2021; Label: Universal Music; Formats: CD, digital download	43	—
Midnight Sun OST (Youngjae ver.)	Released: August 25, 2021; Label: Universal Music; Formats: CD, digital download	47	—
Midnight Sun OST (Kei ver.)	Released: August 25, 2021; Label: Universal Music; Formats: CD, digital download	56	—

== Critical reception ==
Midnight Sun was a box office success, selling out tickets during its run, and drawing favorable reviews from domestic as well as global audiences. Praises were directed to its melodic numbers, the lyrics, the stage directing and the moving performances of the actors. After two weeks, the online screening attracted 26,000 people from 80 countries, reaching 82,731 audiences from 114 countries by the end of its run. The number of offline and online audiences were similar, with 70% of the online audience made by foreigners. The sitzprobe, which aired online on April 24 before the opening, attracted 20,000 people.

Next Daily highlighted the faithful reproduction of the scenes from the original work, which were reinterpreted with a musical feeling, as the strength of the play, and stated that Haena and Haram's pursuit of the ordinary made people reflect on the new concept of normality brought about by the COVID-19 pandemic. However, it lamented that the short running time hindered Midnight Sun from showing the two main characters' emotions more delicately.

For The Voice of the People, "The development and subject matter presented universal emotions such as the freshness of a first love, the affection and the sadness of a terminally ill patient, and a family member watching over them. You can feel the familiarity that anyone can relate to, but on the other hand, it is also banal. There is no dramatic development, but you can find a quiet laugh in the cute stories such as the tactless first meeting, the affectionate unrequited crush, and the thrilling first love, and a familiar emotion is guaranteed in the story of Haram and Haena's family, who stay by Haena's side until the end."
