= Connection (Onew EP) =

- Digital cover

EP by Onew
- Released: January 6, 2025
- Studio: InGrid (Seoul)
- Genre: K-pop
- Length: 17:09
- Language: Korean
- Label: Griffin
- Producers: Onew; Ditch David

Onew chronology
| Flow (2024) | Connection (2025) | Percent (2025) |

Singles from Connection
- 1. "Yay" Released: December 12, 2024; 2. "Winner" Released: January 6, 2025

Connection is the fourth Korean-language and fifth overall extended play (EP) by South Korean singer Onew. It was released on January 6, 2025, by Griffin Entertainment. The EP was preceded by the first single, "Yay", on December 12, and supported by the lead single, "Winner", released simultaneously with the EP.

== Background and release ==
In September 2024, Onew released Flow, his first project since departing SM Entertainment in early 2024. Following its release, he held a series of concerts in South Korea and Japan that October and November. News of a followup to Flow first came three months after its release, when a single, "Yay", was announced on December 9. The announcement stated that the song was to be a pre-release single for an upcoming EP to be released in January 2025, but no specific date or title were given. "Yay", along with its accompanying music video, were released on December 12.

On December 14, Onew held a fan meeting entitled O! New Day at KBS Arena, which was sold out. The next day, the EP's title, Connection, was officially announced, along with its release date, January 6, 2025.

== Promotion ==
Promotional material for the EP, including the lead single's music video, was filmed on-location in Prague, Czech Republic. Onew promoted Connection with his third concert tour, Onew the Live: Connection. The tour commenced in Yokohama, Japan, on February 15, 2025, and concluded in Los Angeles on May 9, 2025.

== Critical reception ==
Mid-year lists
| Critic/Publication | List | Work | Rank | Ref. |
|---|---|---|---|---|
| Billboard | The 25 Best K-Pop Songs of 2025 (So Far): Critic's Picks | "Winner" | 22 | |

Year-end lists
| Critic/Publication | List | Work | Rank | Ref. |
|---|---|---|---|---|
| Rolling Stone India | The 25 Best K-Pop Songs of 2025 | "Winner" | —N/a | |

== Track listing ==
Connection track listing
| No. | Title | Lyrics | Music | Arrangement | Length |
|---|---|---|---|---|---|
| 1. | "Winner" | Seo Ji-eum; Onew | Josh McClelland; Gabriel Brandes; Jayble; Ditch David | Jayble; David | 3:03 |
| 2. | "Promise You" | Onew; Hyun Ji-won | Davey Nate; Chkmate; Blkcube; David | Chkmate; Blkcube; David | 2:40 |
| 3. | "Boy" (Korean: 소년; RR: Sonyeon) | Onew; Hyun | David; Robin | David | 2:40 |
| 4. | "Gradation" (번져; Beonjyeo) | Danke; Onew | David; Hahm | David; Hahm | 2:56 |
| 5. | "Conversation" | Shin Sa-kang; Onew | McClelland; Robbie McDade; Pete Hammerton | Hammerton | 2:57 |
| 6. | "Yay" (만세; Manse) | Onew; Lee Seu-ran | Ben Samama; David; Zenon | Samama; David | 2:52 |
| Total length: | | | | | 17:09 |

== Charts ==
=== Weekly charts ===
Weekly chart performance for Connection
| Chart (2025) | Peak position |
|---|---|
| Japanese Albums (Oricon) | 7 |
| Japanese Combined Albums (Oricon) | 8 |
| Japanese Download Albums (Billboard Japan) | 4 |
| South Korean Albums (Circle) | 3 |

=== Monthly charts ===
Monthly chart performance for Connection
| Chart (2025) | Position |
|---|---|
| Japanese Albums (Oricon) | 20 |
| South Korean Albums (Circle) | 8 |
