= Saku (EP) =

- Digital cover

EP by Onew
- Released: October 1, 2025
- Genre: J-pop
- Length: 16:54
- Language: Japanese
- Label: Victor

Onew chronology
Percent (2025)	Saku (2025)	Tough Love (2026)

Singles from Saku
- 1. "Hana no Yoni" Released: October 1, 2025

Saku is the second Japanese extended play (EP) by South Korean singer Onew. It was released on October 1, 2025, through Victor Entertainment. It contains five songs, including the lead single, "Hana no Yoni".

== Composition ==
The Japanese word saku means "to bloom", and each of the EP's five tracks contain stories related to flowers. Onew said he chose the title to reflect how life's happy moments can bloom like flowers. The opening song, "Kimi=Hana", describes the colourful flowers that bloom in each season. Lead single "Hana no Yoni" expresses fond memories of a lover. "Lily" describes driving along a highway at night after fighting with a romantic partner. In "Beautiful Snowdrop", Onew fantasises about the object of his affections. The final song, "'Cause I Believe in Your Love", is about a promise to meet again one day.

== Release and promotion ==
Saku was released on October 1, 2025. To promote the EP, concept photos were released in three parts, starting on September 1, depicting flowers in different colours. Onew also released various promotional videos, including a highlight medley featuring snippets of each track and a commentary video where he discussed his thoughts about the songs. He performed songs from the EP at the Nippon Budokan on October 3–5, as part of his tour, Onew the Live: Percent (%).

== Track listing ==
Saku track listing
No.	Title	Lyrics	Music	Arrangement	Length
1.	"Kimi=Hana"	Ladyhood (Digz, Inc. Group)	Earattack; Boy Matthews; Eniac	Earattack; Eniac	3:04
2.	"Hana no Yoni" (花のように)	Shinquo Ogura	Ogura	Ogura	4:03
3.	"Lily"	Ogura	Ogura	Ogura; Arata Umehara	2:59
4.	"Beautiful Snowdrop"	Toru Ishikawa	Maiz; Haris Alagic; Scott Quinn	Maiz; Alagic	3:05
5.	"'Cause I Believe in Your Love"	Ryosuke Nakazato	Parkmoonchi; Frants; Ciara Muscat	Parkmoonchi; Frants	3:43
Total length:					16:54

== Charts ==
=== Weekly charts ===
Weekly chart performance for Saku
Chart (2025)	Peak position
Japanese Albums (Oricon)	5
Japanese Combined Albums (Oricon)	6
Japanese Hot Albums (Billboard Japan)	45

=== Monthly charts ===
Monthly chart performance for Saku
Chart (2025)	Position
Japanese Albums (Oricon)	30
