= Dice (EP) =

- Digital and Rolling version cover

EP by Onew
- Released: April 11, 2022
- Studios: Doobdoob (Seoul); SM Big Shot (Seoul); SM LVYIN (Seoul); SM Starlight (Seoul); SM Yellow Tail (Seoul)
- Genre: Pop
- Length: 20:59
- Language: Korean
- Labels: SM; Dreamus
- Producers: Lee Soo-man; Hitchhiker; Cha Cha Malone; Cook Classics; Sam Klempner; Scott Quinn; Lostboy; The 6; Dirty Rice; M. Lee

Onew chronology
Voice (2018)	Dice (2022)	Life Goes On (2022)

Singles from Dice
- 1. "Dice" Released: April 11, 2022

Dice is the second extended play by South Korean singer Onew. It was released on April 11, 2022, through SM Entertainment. It consists of six tracks, including the lead single of the same name.

== Background and release ==
Onew released his debut solo EP, Voice, in 2018, after which he enlisted in the military. His second EP was initially scheduled for a September 2021 release, before eventually being confirmed for April 2022, three years and four months after Voice. Onew took a greater role in the production process than on his first EP, and stated that he felt increased pressure as a result. Promotional materials, including video and image teasers, were released beginning March 31. Onew hosted a countdown livestream on Shinee's YouTube channel on April 11 to celebrate the EP's release. He promoted it with performances on M Countdown, Music Bank, Inkigayo and Show! Music Core, marking his first time engaging in promotional activities for a solo release.

== Composition ==
"I wanted to show that Onew is a person who can do not only calm songs, such as ballads or drama soundtracks, but also can dance and try something new."

— Onew at a press conference about the selection of songs on the EP

Onew included songs from a wide range of genres in order to showcase his diversity as an artist. The six tracks on the EP represent the six sides of a dice, each reflecting different aspects of his artistry. Lead single "Dice" is a pop song that contains rhythmical guitar plucking and synth sounds. It is about betting on love despite knowing it's a game one will inevitably lose. "Sunshine" is an upbeat electronic pop song about embarking on a spontaneous trip and escaping from the monotony of daily life. It is guided by a bassline which is aided by an electric guitar. "On the Way" is a romantic song with a fantasy sound that utilises piano and guitar adlibs. The lyrics detail losing sleep at night, thinking about another person and wanting to go to them. "Love Phobia" is an alternative pop song that expresses scepticism about love while simultaneously desiring it. "Yeowoobi" is an emotional break-up song with a dreamlike yet lonely atmosphere. The lyrics compare feelings of love that are warm but sad to a rain shower in the sunlight. "In the Whale" is a midtempo pop song that takes the listener on a "metaphorical journey through the insides of a beast". The lyrics, written by Onew, express that he will always be by his fans' side, even in the darkness.

== Critical reception ==
Professional ratings
Review scores
Source	Rating
The Line of Best Fit	8/10 stars
NME	5/5 stars

Dice received critical acclaim. Tássia Assis from NME gave Dice a 5 out of 5 stars, describing the EP as "multifaceted" as it offered a variety of sounds yet all six tracks sat together cohesively, which allowed Onew to showcase his true talent. She states that: "for a long time, and despite his proven talent, it felt like Onew stood in the shadows – or inside a whale, if you will – but the skies have cleared now. There’s a whole ocean to explore ahead. By taking a chance and trusting his own experience, Onew allows himself to shine in all his multifaceted glory." Sophia Simon-Bashall of The Line of Best Fit felt that the songs "showcase that Onew is an artist of variety" and praised his vocal delivery. She named "On the Way" and "Love Phobia" as album highlights.

=== Year-end lists ===
Year-end lists
Critic/Publication	List	Work	Rank	Ref.
SoundX	The 10 Best EPs of 2022	Dice	9	
SoundX	The 30 Best K-Pop Projects of 2022	Dice	4	
Omelete	Top 10 K-pop albums of 2022	Dice	2	
Teen Vogue	The 79 Best K-Pop Songs of 2022	"In The Whale"	—N/a	
Clash	The 20 Best K-Pop B-Sides From 2022	"Love Phobia"	—N/a	

== Track listing ==
Dice track listing
No.	Title	Lyrics	Music	Arrangement	Length
1.	"Dice"	Kang Eun-jung	Will Lobban-Bean; Griffith Clawson; Jesse Fink	Cook Classics; Hitchhiker	3:06
2.	"Sunshine"	Jo Yoon-kyung	Sam Klempner; Scott Quinn; Lindy Robbins	Klempner; Quinn; Hitchhiker	3:49
3.	"On the Way"	Hwang Yu-bin	Cha Cha Malone; Sam Kim; Adrian McKinnon; Tay Jasper; Singing Beetle	Malone	3:58
4.	"Love Phobia"	Jo Dong-hee	Sakima; Danny Casio; Peter Rycroft; Richard Boardman	Lostboy; The 6	3:10
5.	"Yeowoobi" (Korean: 여우비; RR: Yeoubi; lit. 'Fox Rain')	Kim Bu-min	Hitchhiker; Kim Bu-min; Charles "Chizzy" Stephens; Robert Edward Stribling	Hitchhiker	3:34
6.	"In the Whale"	Onew; Seo Ji-eum	Dirty Rice; M. Lee; Cru Alxndr	Dirty Rice; M. Lee	3:19
Total length:					20:59

== Personnel ==
Credits adapted from the album liner notes.

- Onew – vocals, background vocals
- Hitchhiker – producer, director, guitar (tracks 1–2, 5), keyboard (tracks 1, 5), vocal directing (track 5), bass (track 5)
- Kenzie – vocal directing (track 1)
- Lee Min-gyu – recording (tracks 1, 4), mixing (track 4), digital editing (track 4), engineering for mix (track 5)
- No Min-ji – recording (tracks 1–2), digital editing (track 3)
- Lee Ji-hong – digital editing (track 1), recording (track 3)
- Jeong Eui-seok – mixing (track 1)
- Jeon Seung-woo – vocal directing (track 2)
- Kang Eun-ji – digital editing (track 2)
- An Chang-gyu – digital editing (track 2), digital editing (track 6)
- Kim Han-gu – mixing (track 2)
- Pollen – vocal directing (tracks 3, 6), background vocals (track 3)
- Jeong Yu-ra – recording (tracks 3–4, 6), digital editing (tracks 4, 6), mixing (track 6)
- Kim Cheol-sun – mixing (track 3)
- Sam Kim – background vocals (track 3)
- Adrian McKinnon – background vocals (track 3)
- Kim Yeon-seo – vocal directing (track 4)
- Kim Bu-min – vocal directing (track 5)
- Kwon Yu-jin – recording (track 5), digital editing (track 5)
- Nam Gung-jin – mixing (track 5)
- Kwon Nam-woo – mastering

== Charts ==
=== Weekly charts ===
Chart performance for Dice
Chart (2022)	Peak position
Japanese Albums (Oricon)	15
Japanese Combined Albums (Oricon)	14
Japanese Hot Albums (Billboard Japan)	8
South Korean Albums (Gaon)	3
UK Album Downloads (Official Charts)	44

=== Monthly charts ===
Monthly chart performance for Dice
Chart (2022)	Peak position
South Korean Albums (Gaon)	6
Japanese Albums (Oricon)	29

=== Year-end charts ===
Year-end chart performance for Dice
Chart (2022)	Position
Japanese Download Albums (Billboard Japan)	100
