= Lee Hyun-ji =

- Born: January 19, 1987 (age 39); South Korea
- Genres: K-pop; electronica
- Occupations: Singer
- Years active: 2008
- Label: Starship Entertainment

Lee Hyun-ji (Korean: 이현지; born January 19, 1987) is a former singer from South Korea. She began her career as a member of the electronica group Banana Girl before debuting as a solo artist in 2008 with the album, Kiss Me Kiss Me. She has since retired from the entertainment industry and works as a kindergarten teacher.

== Discography ==
=== Album ===
Title	Album details	Peak chart positions
Title	Album details	KOR
Kiss Me Kiss Me	Released: September 2, 2008; Label: Starship Entertainment; Format: CD	76

== Filmography ==
Year	Title	Role	Ref.
2008	We Got Married	Herself	
