= Flow (EP) =

- Digital cover

EP by Onew
- Released: September 3, 2024
- Studios: InGrid (Seoul); JJ Music (Seoul)
- Genre: K-pop
- Length: 15:45
- Language: Korean
- Labels: Griffin; Dreamus
- Producers: Onew; Ditch David

Onew chronology
Circle (2023)	Flow (2024)	Connection (2025)

Singles from Flow
- 1. "All Day" Released: July 15, 2024; 2. "Beat Drum" Released: September 3, 2024

Flow is the third Korean-language extended play (EP) by South Korean singer Onew. It was released on September 3, 2024, through Griffin Entertainment. The EP contains six songs, including singles "All Day" and "Beat Drum".

== Background ==
Onew's contract with his agency, SM Entertainment, expired in March 2024. He signed a new contract with Griffin Entertainment for his solo promotions. During an appearance on the music talk show The Seasons, he said that he made the change because he felt he was getting too comfortable at SM and wanted to pursue new challenges. Onew began working on the EP in April 2024. He produced it himself and wrote lyrics for all of the songs, stating in an interview, "There's no part that I haven't touched." He embarked on a fan meeting tour in May, at which he performed a new unreleased song titled "All Day". On July 11, he announced through his social media accounts that he would release "All Day" as a digital single on July 15, followed by his third EP, Flow, in September. The EP came a year and a half after his previous album, Circle, and was his first release under his new agency. Onew described it as his "brightest" album, saying that he wanted to become more approachable to the public.

== Release and promotion ==
On August 13, 2024, Onew revealed the promotional plan for his new EP, confirming that it would be released on September 3. Ahead of its release, he uploaded concept images themed around the days of the week to his social media accounts, followed by highlight clips containing snippets of the songs. He appeared on The Seasons on August 19, where he performed "All Day" and part of the EP track "Hola!". Onew held a pop-up store in Seoul from September 5 to September 15, at which visitors were able to listen to all six tracks and view the music video set for "Beat Drum". Onew decided he wouldn't be appearing on music shows to promote this EP, preferring to use that time to plan for his live performances. He held a series of concerts, titled Hola!, in South Korea, Taiwan and Japan, where he performed songs from the EP.

== Critical reception ==
Year-end lists
Critic/Publication	List	Work	Rank	Ref.
Billboard	The 25 Best K-Pop Albums of 2024: Staff Picks	Flow	7	
Dazed	The 50 Best K-Pop Tracks of 2024	"Maestro"	—N/a	
Clash	The Most Slept-On K-Pop Tunes Of 2024	"All Day"	—N/a	

== Track listing ==
Flow track listing
No.	Title	Lyrics	Music	Arrangement	Length
1.	"Beat Drum" (매력; lit. 'Charm')	Park Rang (XXYX); Onew	Charlie Martin; Joe Housley; Hight; Rene Miller	The Nocturns; Ditch David	2:21
2.	"Hola!"	Kim Eana; Onew	Josh McClelland; Arthur Hill; Kin	Kin	2:52
3.	"Maestro" (마에스트로)	Seo Jeong-a; Onew	Duck Blackwell; Andrew Jackson; Bill Maybury; Valencia	Blackwell	2:57
4.	"Shape of My Heart"	Jeon Ji-eun; Onew	David; Boran; Haedo; Dawson	David	2:46
5.	"All Day" (월화수목금토일; lit. 'Mon Tue Wed Thu Fri Sat Sun')	Jeon; Zenon; Onew	Ben Samama; Michelle Buzz; David	Samama; David	2:27
6.	"Focus"	Jo Yoon-kyung; Onew	Samama; David	Samama; David	2:20
Total length:					15:45

== Personnel ==
- Onew – vocals, background vocals, producing
- Ju Chan-yang (Pollen) – vocal directing (tracks 1–2, 4–6), background vocals (tracks 1–4, 6)
- Yeo Min-su – recording (tracks 1–3)
- Gu Jong-pil – mixing (tracks 1–2, 4)
- Hong Jang-mi – engineering for mix (tracks 1–2, 4)
- Kwon Nam-woo – mastering
- Ditch David – background vocals (track 3), producing
- Dawson – recording (track 3)
- Kim Han-gu – mixing (tracks 3, 5–6)
- Haedo – background vocals (track 4)
- Boran – background vocals (track 4)
- Jung Eun-kyung – recording (tracks 4, 6)
- Babylon – background vocals (track 5)
- Yang Yung-eun – recording (track 5)

== Charts ==
=== Weekly charts ===
Weekly chart performance for Flow
Chart (2024)	Peak position
Japanese Albums (Oricon)	10
Japanese Combined Albums (Oricon)	21
Japanese Hot Albums (Billboard Japan)	16
South Korean Albums (Circle)	5

=== Monthly charts ===
Monthly chart performance for Flow
Chart (2023)	Peak position
Japanese Albums (Oricon)	33
South Korean Albums (Circle)	12
