= SM Town Live 2023: SMCU Palace =

2023–24 series of concerts by SM Town

- Concert by SM Town
- Promotional poster for the free online New Year concert
- Location: Worldwide; Asia
- Associated album: 2022 Winter SM Town: SMCU Palace
- Start date: January 1, 2023
- End date: February 22, 2024
- No. of shows: 4

SM Town concert chronology
- SM Town Live 2022: SMCU Express (2022); SM Town Live 2023: SMCU Palace (2023–2024); SM Town Live 2025: The Culture, the Future (2025–2026)

SM Town Live 2023: SMCU Palace (titled SM Town Live 2024: SMCU Palace for the shows held in 2024) was a series of online and in-person concerts organized by SM Entertainment. The series began with a free online concert on January 1, 2023, following the format of the 2021 and 2022 editions. The New Year concert was broadcast free of charge via various streaming platforms and select broadcasting networks in participating countries.

== Background ==
On November 30, 2022, SM Entertainment announced that it would be releasing a winter album titled 2022 Winter SM Town: SMCU Palace. In the same announcement, it was also announced that a free-to-watch live online concert will also be held on January 1, 2023. The lineup consisting of Kangta, BoA, TVXQ, Super Junior, Taeyeon and Hyoyeon of Girls' Generation, Onew, Key, and Minho of Shinee, Suho, Xiumin, Chen, Chanyeol, D.O., Kai, and Sehun of Exo, Red Velvet, NCT U, NCT 127, NCT Dream, WayV, Aespa, Got the Beat, DJ Hyo, Raiden, Ginjo, Mar Vista, Imlay, and Johnny was announced on December 28, 2022. On December 29, 2022, it was announced Got the Beat would be performing their new song titled "Stamp on It" from their upcoming EP of the same name prior to the actual release.

In July 2023, SM Entertainment announced an in-person concert in Jakarta, to be held at Gelora Bung Karno Stadium on September 23, 2023. This marked SM Town's first concert in Indonesia since the SM Town Live World Tour III in 2012. Later, in November 2023, the Tokyo shows were announced to be held at the Tokyo Dome from February 21 to 22, 2024.

== Set lists ==
New Year Free Online Show – South Korea (January 1, 2023)

Main show

List of performers
Performer(s)	Song(s) performed
NCT Dream	"Beatbox" "Hot Sauce"
Aespa	"Girls"
WayV	"Love Talk" "Take Off"
NCT 127	"Cherry Bomb"
Kai; Seulgi; Jeno; Karina	"Hot & Cold"
Red Velvet; Aespa	"Beautiful Christmas"
Suho	"Let's Love"
Chen	"Last Scene"
Kangta; Ryeowook	"Polaris"
Kangta; Yesung; Suho; Taeil; Renjun	"Happier"
BoA; Wendy; Ningning	"Time After Time"
Super Junior	"Celebrate"
NCT Dream	"Candy"
Max Changmin; Taeyeon; Winter	"Priority"
Kangta	"Eyes On You"
Exo-SC	"Fly Away" (with Suho) "Rodeo Station"
Minho	"Chase"
Exo	"The First Snow"
Red Velvet	"Red Flavor" "Queendom"
Raiden; Chanyeol	"Yours" (with Mark and Winter)
Xiumin	"Brand New"
Onew	"Dice"
Hyoyeon	"Deep"
Taeyong; Jeno; Hendery; Yangyang; Giselle	"Zoo"
Super Junior-D&E	"Danger"
Super Junior	"Black Suit" "Sorry, Sorry" "Mango"
NCT 127	"Kick It" "Sticker"
Key	"Gasoline"
Aespa	"Illusion"
Kai	"Mmmh"
Seulgi	"28 Reasons"
Taeyeon	"INVU"
Red Velvet	"Feel My Rhythm"
BoA	"Forgive Me"
NCT U	"The 7th Sense"
TVXQ	"Maximum" "The Chance of Love" "Keep Your Head Down"
BoA	"Better"
WayV	"Phantom"
NCT U	"Universe (Let's Play Ball)"
NCT Dream	"Glitch Mode"
Aespa	"Next Level"
NCT 127	"2 Baddies"
Red Velvet	"Birthday"
NCT U	"Baby Don't Stop"
Exo	"Love Shot"
Super Junior	"Mr. Simple"
TVXQ	"Mirotic"
Got the Beat	"Stamp on It" "Step Back"
SM Town	"Hope from Kwangya"

After show

List of performers
Performer(s)	Song(s) performed
DJ Hyo	DJ set
Raiden	DJ set
Ginjo	DJ set
Mar Vista	DJ set
Imlay	DJ set
Johnny	DJ set

Jakarta, Indonesia (September 23, 2023)

Main show

Performer(s)	Song(s)
Aespa	"Girls" "Hold on Tight" "Better Things" "Next Level"
WayV	"Kick Back" "Take Off" "It's Only Me" "Love Talk"
NCT 127	"Limitless" "Lemonade" "Ay-Yo" "Kick It"
Super Junior	"Black Suit" "Mamacita" "Mr. Simple" "Bonamana"
Taeyong Jeno Hendery Yangyang Giselle	"Zoo"
NCT Dream	"Candy"
Riize	"Memories"
Red Velvet	"Psycho" "Birthday" "Queendom" "Red Flavor"
NCT Dream	"Glitch Mode" "Hot Sauce" "Yogurt Shake" "Beatbox"
TVXQ!	"Rising Sun" "Keep Your Head Down" "Hi Ya Ya" "Balloons" "Somebody to Love"
Riize	"Get a Guitar"
NCT U	"Baggy Jeans"
Aespa	"Spicy"
NCT Dream	"ISTJ"
WayV	"Phantom"
Red Velvet	"Feel My Rhythm"
NCT 127	"Faster" "2 Baddies"
TVXQ!	"Mirotic"
Super Junior	"Sorry, Sorry"
SM Town	"Hope from Kwangya"

Tokyo, Japan (February 21–22, 2024)

Main show

Performer(s)	Song(s)
NCT Wish	"NASA" "Hands Up"
Hyo	"Dessert" (with Yangyang)
Zhou Mi	"Mañana (Our Drama)" (with Eunhyuk) "Starry Night" (with Ryeowook)
Kangta	"Doll" (with Doyoung) "Eyes On You"
Riize	"Get a Guitar" "Love 119"
Aespa	"Next Level" "Spicy"
WayV	"Love Talk" "Phantom"
Yesung	"Pretender"
Kai Seulgi Jeno Karina	"Hot & Cold"
NCT 127	"Be There for Me"
Wendy Winter	"Her Blue Sky"
Ryeowook	"The Little Prince" (with Sohee)
Taeyeon	"To. X"
Red Velvet – Irene & Seulgi	"Monster"
Super Junior	"U" (with NCT Wish)
TVXQ!	"Rising Sun" (with Riize)
NCT Dream	"Best Friend Ever" "We Go Up"
Hyo	"Picture"
Taeyeon	"Starlight" (with Jaehyun)
Max Changmin Kyuhyun Shotaro	"Idol"
Taeyong	"Shalala" "Tap"
Red Velvet	"Wildside" "Chill Kill"
Super Junior	"Sorry, Sorry" "Bonamana"
Taeyong Jeno Hendery Yangyang Giselle	"Zoo"
Ten	"Nightwalker"
TVXQ!	"Down"
Riize	"Talk Saxy" "Siren"
Aespa	"Drama"
NCT U	"Baggy Jeans"
NCT Wish	"Wish"
NCT Dream	"ISTJ"
WayV	"On My Youth"
NCT 127	"2 Baddies" "Fact Check"
Red Velvet	"Feel My Rhythm"
Super Junior	"Black Suit"
TVXQ!	"Rebel" "Mirotic"
SM Town	"Hope from Kwangya"

== Tour dates ==
List of concert dates
Date	City	Country	Venue	Attendance
January 1, 2023	Various	South Korea	Various	—N/a
September 23, 2023	Jakarta	Indonesia	Gelora Bung Karno Stadium	50,000
February 21, 2024	Tokyo	Japan	Tokyo Dome	100,000
February 22, 2024	Tokyo	Japan	Tokyo Dome	100,000
Total				150,000

== Broadcast ==
This list is only for the New Year free show. The Jakarta and final Tokyo shows were available as paid broadcasts on Beyond Live and Weverse.

List of broadcasters
Country	Network/Platform	Ref.
Worldwide	YouTube; Beyond Live; TikTok; Instagram; IdolPlus	
Indonesia	RCTI+; Vision+; Vidio; InsertLive; Trans TV; WeTV	
Japan	KNTV	
Thailand	TrueID TV	
Vietnam	VieON; FPT Play; Zing MP3; POPS	
