= Pencils of Promise =

US non-profit organization

Pencils of Promise, Inc.
- Founded: October 2008
- Founder: Adam Braun
- Type: Non-governmental organization
- Purpose: Education
- Location: United States
- Region served: Ghana, Guatemala, Laos
- Method: Providing quality education to underserved communities around the world
- CEO: Leslie Engle
- Key people: Adam Braun, Justin Bieber
- Website: pencilsofpromise.org

Pencils of Promise (PoP) is a US non-profit organization that builds schools and increases educational opportunities in the developing world. Pencils of Promise was founded by Adam Braun. Since its founding in October 2008, the 501(c)(3) organization has built 605 schools across Laos, Guatemala and Ghana. More than 110,000 students attend the schools globally.

== Background ==
While visiting India in 2005 as a student on the Semester at Sea study abroad program, Braun met a young child who shared his wish for a pencil. Realizing how important education was in many developing countries, Braun visited more than 50 countries distributing pencils to children wherever he went. In October 2008, he established the charity with the aim of providing quality education to children in some of the most underserved countries around the world.

== Mission ==
Pencils of Promise believes every child should have access to quality education. They create schools, programs, and global communities around the common goal of education for all. Pencils of Promise focuses on building strong structures and sustainable education programs by forming long-lasting, collaborative relationships with communities. Sites are picked taking into account need, sustainability, cost efficiency, impact and commitment. The facilities are built with local labor and material. The charity also supports projects through ongoing teacher training, progression scholarships and WASH (water, sanitation, and hygiene) programming.

Each school and office is led by staff and teachers from the region.

== Support ==
The charity is supported by a number of celebrities and most prominently by Scooter Braun, a well-known entertainment manager, and elder brother of the founder. Also involved from the first days of the organization is one of Scooter Braun's biggest acts, Justin Bieber who has lent his voice as an international celebrity spokesman for the organization by running ads for the charity and its campaign Schools4All and promising to visit schools that donate the most funds to the organization. Bieber takes part in the annual charity's fundraising gala and donates a portion of proceeds from his concerts and line of fragrances "Someday" and various merchandising to the charity.

DJ 3lau is also a major supporter of the charity. With the proceeds from his remix "Back to New", 3lau raised $25,000 for the charity and helped to build Justo Rufino Primary School in Guatemala, raising over $10,000 towards building a second school for the charity.

The current board leadership includes investor Gary Vaynerchuk, journalist Michael Weiss and scholar Meighan Stone. Actress Sophia Bush also sits on the advisory board. In 2019, Netflix CMO Bozoma Saint John joined the organization as the first global ambassador to Ghana.
