= ScreaM Records =

South Korean record label

- Parent company: SM Entertainment
- Founded: 2016; 10 years ago
- Genre: EDM; Dance music
- Country of origin: South Korea
- Official website: screamrecords.com

ScreaM Records (Korean: 스크림 레코즈) is a dance music label established in 2016 by South Korean record label SM Entertainment.

== History ==
Label logo until March 2024

In 2016, SM Entertainment executive producer Lee Soo-man introduced the EDM label ScreaM Records in the presentation show SMTOWN: New Culture Technology, 2016, held at the SM Town Coex Artium. According to Lee, the label aims to expand from "view and listen performance" to "enjoy performance together". The label was also designed to "promote music" through collaborations with global EDM DJs, producers, and various artists at South Korea and abroad.

The idea behind the creation of the label was made by Lee Seo-kyung, a former SM A&R overseas employee. Previously, Lee worked on Shinee's "View" (2015) and f(x)'s "4 Walls" (2015), which incorporated songs of the deep house genre into K-pop for the first time. Lee Soo-man gave his opinion and he accepted it. There was a speculation that SM The Performance might have brought Zedd's song with it. According to an interview between music critic Lee Dae-hwa and Lee Seo-kyung, it was planned as a label that covers the entire electronic music, but it was said that the word "EDM" was used to express it in empathetic terms.

In April 2024, ScreaM Records expansion as Dance Music Label and revealed their new logo.

In May 2024, ScreaM Records launch sub-brand, Scream Academy, an educational program that provides practical tips and know-how from talented domestic and international electronic music producers to anyone interested in electronic music. This sub-brand was launch following the label signed MOU with Seoul Institute of the Arts in May 2023.

== Artists ==
- Hyo (Note: Hyo also affiliated by the main label SM Entertainment through ONE Productions.)
- Imlay (2017–present)
- Raiden (2019–present) (Note: Raiden also affiliated by the main label SM Entertainment through PRISM Productions.)
- Mar Vista (2022–present)
- 2Spade (2024–present) (Note: 2Spade firstly released his debut EP through ScreaM Records in November 2023 prior to signed with the label in November 2024.)
- Arkins (2026–present)

== Former artists ==
- Ginjo (2018–2024)

== Discography ==
2016

Released	Title	Artist	Type	Format	Language	Ref.
May 6	"Wave"	R3hab, Amber, & Luna	Digital single	Download, streaming	Korean	
May 23	"I Just Wanna Dance (Kago Pengchi Remix)"	Tiffany	Digital single	Download, streaming	English	
October 2	"Heartbeat"	Amber & Luna (feat. Ferry Corsten & Kago Pengchi)	Digital single	Download, streaming	Korean and English	
October 7	"Years"	Alesso & Chen	Digital single	Download, streaming	Korean and Mandarin	

2017

Released	Title	Artist	Type	Format	Language	Ref.
June 30	"Decalcomanie"	IMLAY & Sik-K	Digital single	Download, streaming	Korean	
August 21	SHURAI	IMLAY	Extended play	Download, streaming	Korean and English	
September 22	Daylight & Cerulean High	IMLAY	Single	Download, streaming	English	
October 20	Power (Remixes)	Exo	Extended play	Download, streaming	Korean	
November 17	"Atmosphere"	Juncoco & Advanced (feat. Ailee)	Digital single	Download, streaming	English	

2018

Released	Title	Artist	Type	Format	Language	Ref.
February 23	"Notorious"	TraxX & LIP2SHOT	Digital single	Download, streaming	Korean and English	
March 30	"You"	Ginjo (feat. Angel)	Digital single	Download, streaming	English	
April 18	Sober	HYO	Digital single	Download, streaming	Korean and English	
November 13	"Punk Right Now"	HYO & 3lau	Digital single	Download, streaming	Korean and English	

2019

Released	Title	Artist	Type	Format	Language	Ref.
February 23	Punk Right Now (Remixes)	HYO & 3lau	Digital single	Download, streaming	English	
July 20	"Badster"	HYO	Digital single	Download, streaming	Korean and English	
August 2	"The Only"	Raiden (feat. Irene)	Digital single	Download, streaming	Korean	

2020

Released	Title	Artist	Type	Format	Language	Ref.
February 19	Dystopia	IMLAY	Extended play	Download, streaming	Korean and English	
May 8	iScreaM Vol. 1 : Kick It (Remixes)	NCT 127	Digital single	Download, streaming	Korean	
May 12	"Yours"	Raiden & Chanyeol (feat. Lee Hi & Changmo)	Digital single	Download, streaming	Korean	
May 31	"The Riot"	Ginjo (feat. Ten & Xiaojun)	Digital single	Download, streaming	English	
June 19	iScreaM Vol. 2 : Ridin' (Remixes)	NCT Dream	Digital single	Download, streaming	Korean	
July 22	"Dessert"	Hyo (feat. Loopy & Soyeon)	Digital single	Download, streaming	Korean	
July 31	iScreaM Vol. 3: Naughty (Demicat Remix)	Red Velvet - Irene & Seulgi	Digital single	Download, streaming	Korean	
August 28	iScreaM Vol. 4: 1 Billion Views (Mar Vista Remix)	Exo-SC (feat. Moon)	Digital single	Download, streaming	Korean	
September 29	iScreaM Vol. 5: Criminal (Remixes)	Taemin	Digital single	Download, streaming	Korean	
December 17	iScreaM Vol. 6 : Make A Wish / 90's Love (Remix)	NCT	Digital single	Download, streaming	Korean	

2021

Released	Title	Artist	Type	Format	Language	Ref.
March 27	iScreaM Vol. 7: Don't Call Me (Remixes)	Shinee	Digital single	Download, streaming	Korean and English	
April 23	iScreaM Vol. 8: Bambi (Remixes)	Baekhyun	Digital single	Download, streaming	Korean and English	
June 10	iScreaM Vol. 9: Hot Sauce (Remixes)	NCT Dream	Digital single	Download, streaming	Korean and English	
August 9	"Second"	Hyo (feat. Bibi)	Digital single	Download, streaming	Korean and English	
September 14	iScreaM Vol. 10: Next Level (Remixes)	Aespa	Digital single	Download, streaming	Korean and English	
October 11	Love Right Back	Raiden	Extended play	Download, streaming	Korean	
October 15	iScreaM Vol. 11: Queendom (Remix)	Red Velvet	Digital single	Download, streaming	Korean	
November 1	iScreaM Vol. 12: Bad Boy (Remixes)	Red Velvet	Digital single	Download, streaming	Korean	
December 30	iScreaM Vol. 13: Sticker (Remixes)	NCT 127	Digital single	Download, streaming	Korean	

2022

Released	Title	Artist	Type	Format	Language	Ref.
February 24	iScreaM Vol. 14: Peaches (Remixes)	Kai	Digital single	Download, streaming	Korean and English	
April 28	iScreaM Vol. 15: INVU (Remixes)	Taeyeon	Digital single	Download, streaming	Korean and English	
May 16	Deep	Hyo	Extended play	CD, download, streaming	Korean and English	
June 21	iScreaM Vol. 16: Glitch Mode (Remixes)	NCT Dream	Digital single	Download, streaming	Korean and English	
September 23	iScreaM Vol. 17: Deep (Remixes)	Hyo	Digital single	Download, streaming	Korean and English	
October 21	iScreaM Vol. 18: Girls (Remixes)	Aespa	Digital single	Download, streaming	Korean and English	
November 17	iScreaM Vol. 19: Forever 1 (Remixes)	Girls' Generation	Digital single	Download, streaming	Korean and English	

2023

Released	Title	Artist	Type	Format	Language	Ref.
January 6	iScreaM Vol. 20: Forever Only (Remix)	Jaehyun	Digital single	Download, streaming	Korean and English	
February 17	iScreaM Vol. 21: 2 Baddies (Remixes)	NCT 127	Digital single	Download, streaming	Korean and English	
March 17	iScreaM Vol. 22: 28 Reasons / Los Angeles (Remixes)	Seulgi	Digital single	Download, streaming	Korean and English	
April 14	iScreaM Vol. 23: Phantom (Remixes)	WayV	Digital single	Download, streaming	Korean and English	
July 13	iScreaM Vol. 24: Perfume (Remixes)	NCT DoJaeJung	Digital single	Download, streaming	Korean and English	
August 31	iScreaM Vol. 25: Red Flavor (Remix)	Red Velvet	Digital single	Download, streaming	Korean and English	
September 15	iScreaM Vol. 26: Spicy (Remix)	Aespa	Digital single	Download, streaming	Korean and English	
November 30	iScreaM Vol. 27: Baggy Jeans (Remixes)	NCT U	Digital single	Download, streaming	Korean and English	
December 14	iScreaM Vol. 28: Get A Guitar (Remixes)	Riize	Digital single	Download, streaming	Korean and English	

2024

Released	Title	Artist	Type	Format	Language	Ref.
January 26	iScreaM Vol. 29: Fact Check (Remixes)	NCT 127	Digital single	Download, streaming	Korean and English	
March 8	iScreaM Vol. 30: To. X (Remixes)	Taeyeon	Digital single	Download, streaming	Korean and English	
April 12	iScreaM Vol. 31: Smoothie (Remix)	NCT Dream	Digital single	Download, streaming	Korean and English	
June 4	iScreaM Vol. 32: Impossible (Remix)	Riize	Digital single	Download, streaming	Korean and English	
September 5	Start Me Up (feat. Kellin Quinn)	Mar Vista	Digital single	Download, streaming	English	
September 20	iScreaM Vol. 33: Supernova / Armageddon (Remixes)	Aespa	Digital single	Download, streaming	Korean and English	
October 7	Re:Works	Aespa; NCT Dream; Riize	Digital single	Download, streaming	Korean and English	
October 23	Pump Me Up	Mar Vista	Extended play	Download, streaming	English	
October 30	Nostalgia 2000	P3PPER, The Deep	Digital single	Download, streaming	English	
November 14	Turn Up The Volume	DRD	Digital single	Download, streaming	English	
December 10	iScreaM Vol. 34: Steady (Remix)	NCT Wish	Digital single	Download, streaming	Korean and English	
December 20	iScreaM Vol. 35: Done (Remix)	Naevis	Digital single	Download, streaming	Korean and English	

2025

Released	Title	Artist	Type	Format	Language	Ref.
February 27	iScreaM Vol. 36: Someone (Remixes)	Min Jiwoon	Digital single	Download, streaming	Korean and English	
March 26	iScreaM Vol. 37: Fraktsiya (Remixes)	Mark (feat. Lee Young-ji)	Digital single	Download, streaming	Korean and English	
November 27	iScreaM Vol. 38: Yes (Remixes)	Hyo	Digital single	Download, streaming	Korean and English	
December 17	ScreaM Rookies: The Chase (Remixes)	Hearts2Hearts	Digital single	Download, streaming	Korean and English	

2026

Released	Title	Artist	Type	Format	Language	Ref.
March 27	iScreaM Vol. 39: Rude! (Remixes)	Hearts2Hearts	Digital single	Download, streaming	Korean and English	
August 28	iScreaM Vol. 40: Surfin' Boy (Remixes)	Red Velvet	Digital single	Download, streaming	Korean and English	

== Festivals and shows ==
- Spectrum Dance Music Festival
- ShowMe
