= NFT music =

Distribution of music as non-fungible tokens

NFT music refers to the use of non-fungible token (NFT) technology to authenticate, distribute, and trade musical works in digital form. NFTs provide unique blockchain-based identifiers for music content, giving each digital asset properties such as non-replicability, traceability, and verifiable ownership. With the development of blockchain technology and the broader Web3 ecosystem, NFT music is regarded as a potential new model that could reshape value distribution, copyright management, and fan engagement within the music industry.

NFT music can be released in various formats, including singles, albums, samples, videos, and derivative merch such as lyric drafts, cover art and ticket stubs. By issuing works as NFTs, artists can bypass intermediaries and sell content directly to fans, share revenue, or offer exclusive utilities such as limited-edition content, special access, concert tickets, or community governance rights.

== Background ==
=== Transformation of the digital music industry ===
Before NFT music emerged, the music industry had structurally shifted from CD to digital download (iTunes), then to streaming media service (Apple Music). Although the last mode effectively suppressed pirate music through monetizing access and was convenient for consumers, its core commercial model, known as the Pro rata Model, was controversial. Most subscription income flowed to the famous record company and artists, while other artists could only earn subsistence pay through single-play copyright royalties (0.003-0.005 dollars per play).

Apart from that, the highly centralized power structure of streaming platforms caused severe information asymmetry. Imogen Heap noted that the music industry is driven by smoke and mirrors, as platforms extract huge benefits by performing tasks that should be automated. As a result, artists not only lose the right to control the prices of their music but also lose economic ties with core fans. This value gap stimulates the need for the music industry to adopt a decentralized solution.

=== Technical Background ===
NFTs (Non-Fungible Tokens) are built on blockchain technology, and their characteristics include indivisibility, non-interchangeability, traceability, and verifiable uniqueness. In the field of NFT Music, music works or music-related digital assets are usually minted into NFTs through smart contracts, so that their ownership and transfer history can be recorded on-chain.

==== Blockchain and smart contracts ====
The infrastructure of NFT Music relies on public blockchains (such as Ethereum, Solana, Polygon, etc.). The ownership, metadata links and transaction records of music content are all managed through smart contracts. The most common NFT standards include:

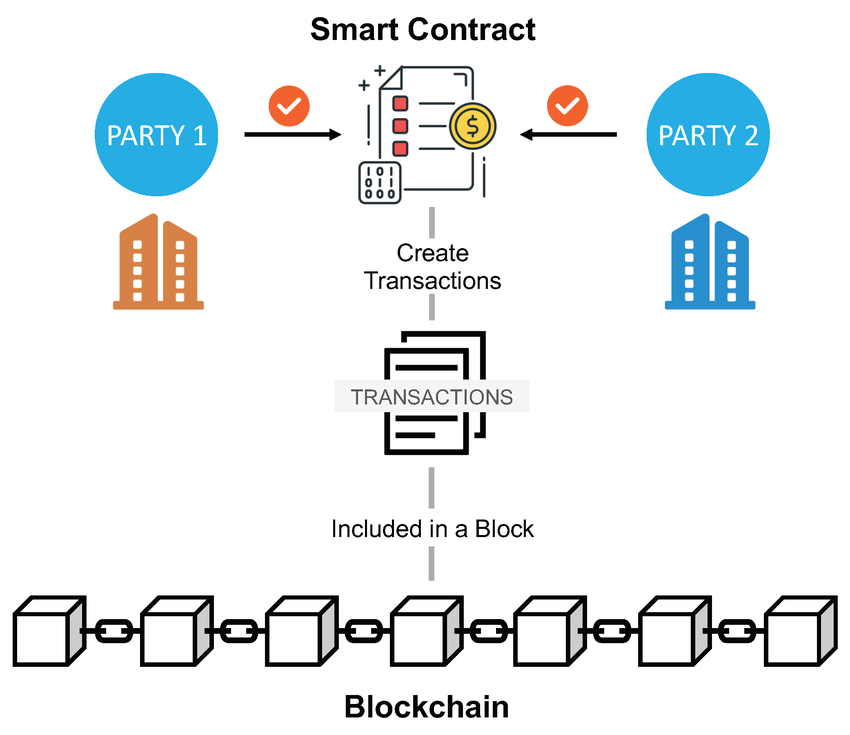
Blockchain-based-smart-contract

- ERC-721: is used to represent unique and irreplaceable music assets, such as limited-edition singles.
- ERC-1155: allows the management of both fungible and non-fungible assets in a contract, making it applicable to the issuance of multiple projects with separate numbers but belonging to the same collection.

==== Storage and metadata ====
Because audio files are relatively large, they are generally not stored directly on the blockchain. Instead, they are hosted on decentralized storage systems like IPFS or Arweave. Smart contracts on the blockchain store hashes, file links, copyright information, and other metadata to ensure that off-chain content remains verifiable and tamper-proof.

==== Digital ownership and royalty mechanisms ====
NFT technology enables musicians to define copyright information, usage rights and revenue rules on-chain. Some platforms realise automatic royalty distribution through smart contracts (such as EIP-2981), allowing rights holders to obtain a preset percentage of revenue when an NFT is sold again in the secondary market. This mechanism improves transparency and provides artists with a sustainable source of income.

==== Interoperability and ecosystem protocols ====
With the continuous development of the NFT music ecosystem, some projects have adopted cross-platform protocols and open standards so that music NFTs can be recognised and used in different markets, participants and social applications. Cross-chain bridges, Layer 2 scaling solutions, and metadata standardization are regarded as key technical means to improve user experience, reduce costs and increase liquidity.

== Uses (NFT Music Platforms) ==
Emerging music NFT platforms all claim to enable direct interaction between artists and fans. They can be divided into dedicated music NFT platforms and general NFT platforms which contains music support, both aiming to transform traditional music revenue models.

=== Music-focused NFT platforms ===
==== Audius ====
Audius is a decentralized music streaming platform that connects artists and fans directly, lets artists earn from listeners, and allows developers to build on its open-source audio protocol across multiple blockchains.

==== Catalog ====
Catalog is a platform for independent music where artists release unique 1/1 digital tracks, fans purchase them with instant payouts to creators, and blockchain handles automatic splits and open data without requiring direct interaction.

==== Sound ====
Sound tackles structural issues in the music industry, where most revenue goes to top artists. It allows musicians to release tracks as unique NFT editions, letting fans support artists early and collect authenticated songs. Each NFT carries a public comment that transfers with ownership.

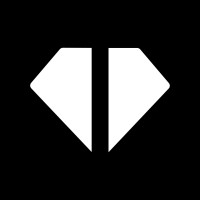
Logo of Royal.io

==== Royal ====
Royal lets artists tokenize portions of their streaming royalties as NFTs, enabling fans to earn a share of future revenue and gain direct on-chain ownership of music rights. The platform works on public blockchains and has been used by both emerging and major artists.

=== General-purpose NFT platforms ===
==== OpenSea ====
OpenSea is an American trading platform for non-homogeneous tokens (NFT). The platform allows users to mint, buy and sell NFTs on multiple blockchains, supporting the listing and auction of fixed-priced digital assets (works of art, music, game items and domain names). Since its launch, OpenSea has developed into the largest general-purpose NFT trading platforms.

== Issues and criticisms ==
=== Relation to decentralization and platformization ===
==== Decentralization ====
Decentralization diagram

Decentralization is frequently highlighted as a key feature of NFT-based music systems, especially regarding blockchain infrastructures, asset management, and industry structure. Blockchain’s transparent and immutable ledger is described as enabling clearer records of issuance, transfer, and provenance, addressing long-standing opacity in copyright databases; however, broader adoption still depends on institutional coordination and standardised metadata across jurisdictions.

Further research indicates that the decentralized system enabled by NFTs and smart contracts may shift power dynamics within the music industry. By recording assets and automating revenue distribution on-chain, this model can partially bypass Web 2.0 platform constraints and is seen as a possible way to reduce the concentration of control among major platforms, labels, and distributors. Nonetheless, most studies emphasise that substantial structural change remains limited, as the distribution, promotion, ranking, and visibility mechanisms is still dominated by established institutions.

Smart contracts are regarded as core infrastructure for music NFTs to support automated royalties, conditional execution, and secondary-market functions. Although smart contracts are often seen as an embodiment of “code is law” by industry insiders, their legal enforceability still varies significantly across jurisdictions in real life, leaving regulatory recognition uncertain

Critical perspectives point out that while the underlying technology behind NFTs is decentralized, the actual ecosystem still relies heavily on centralized marketplace platforms for core functions such as asset presentation, transaction matching, ranking systems, and compliance processes. Consequently, music NFT practices often display a form of “partial decentralization.”

==== Re-platformization ====
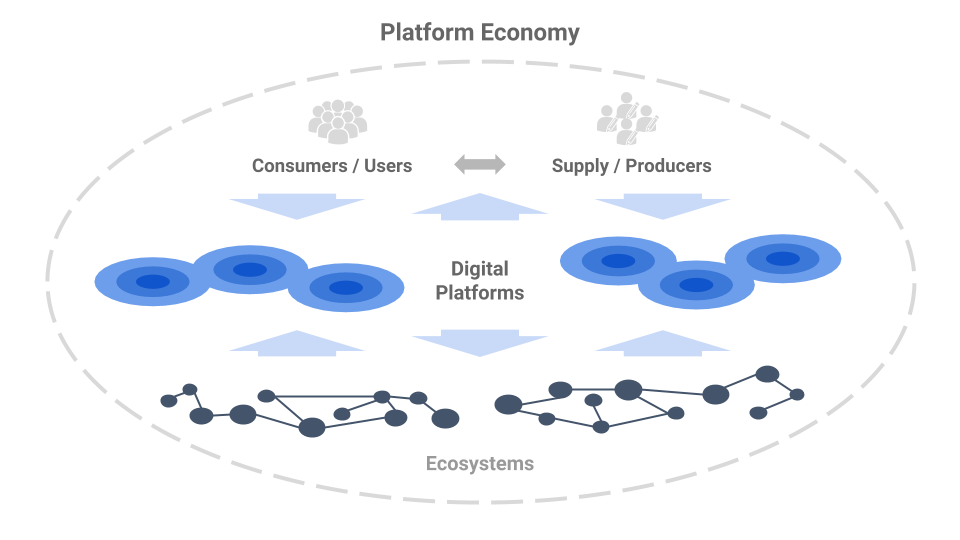
Platform Economy

Platformization refers to structuring the digital music ecosystem around platform-based commercial and technical frameworks, including content distribution, recommendation algorithms, transaction matching, and visibility management. There is a dual logic on the introduction of NFTs: on one hand, NFTs aim to reduce the traditional extraction of creator revenue by centralized platforms; on the other hand, discussions of NFT music still consistently use the term "platform", despite its centralized connotations at the beginning. This combination of decentralization ambitions and continued platform use is better understood as re-platformization, which aims to retain the advantages of platform-based structures while creating fairer revenue distribution systems.

Compared to traditional streaming platforms such as Spotify or Apple Music, NFT platforms (e.g., OpenSea, Sound.xyz, Audius) use on-chain registration and smart contracts to automate revenue distribution, which allows artists to retain most primary sales revenue and continue earning royalties on secondary markets. However, traditional platforms rely on centralized systems for royalty settlements and control exposure through confidential algorithms. It was indicated that in 2017, the U.S. music industry generated about US$43 billion, but artists received only around 12%. NFT platforms offer higher revenue shares and direct economic incentives, providing a fairer income pathway for both independent and emerging artists.

Re-platformization also integrates fans into the creative and support process. For example, Royal enables artists to rely on dedicated fans for project support while rewarding fans with special rights. This combination of music’s social and economic value highlights how the ecosystem is structured around platforms: while NFT systems enable features like on-chain recording and automated royalties, commercial visibility and market opportunities still rely on a few dominant platforms. At the same time, emerging platforms are creating fairer economic arrangements for creators.

=== Impact on NFT participants ===
==== Creators' perspective ====
NFTs negatively and positively impact creators. The former includes new operational burdens, while the latter offers financial liberation. On the positive side, the most obvious is that artists now have various income sources to support themselves. Apart from direct income from selling NFT music, NFT-related tax benefits provide artists with continuous income as their careers develop. Another opportunity is for artists to release B-side songs or experimental records that do not fit into the commercial cycle of creation. NFT markets value provenance and scarcity rather than work in a popular style.

Nevertheless, artists face several challenges. First and foremost, casting requires an upfront cost, although it's decreasing. More importantly, creating NFT music demands crypto literacy, including understanding security and smart contract operations. Additionally, artists’ income depends on the crypto market, and if it crashes, their value and fans’ purchasing power will disappear. Lastly, if artists release records without properly cleaning the samples, they could face legal risks. On the contrary, they face the problem of copy minting. The application of intellectual property laws is complex and practically hard.

==== Fans' perspective ====
Fans shift from consumers to stakeholders. Since the value of their assets (NFTs) would increase with the success of artists, they are motivated to recommend artists. Economically, artists and fans are united. Through DAO governance, token-holding fans vote on artists' strategies, blurring the line between audience and administrators.

There are also risks and burdens that fans take on. If the value of NFTs decreases, fans would also lose money, creating a toxic dynamic: they turn into angry investors when the floor price drops. Besides, if connecting artists requires high-priced NFTs, low-income fans will be excluded.

=== Market reception ===
==== Speculative bubbles and wash trading ====
Critics believe that the high price of music NFT between 2021 and 2022 is mainly driven by washing trading (a market manipulation behaviour, that is, investors buy and sell the same asset to create false trading activities) and speculation, rather than the actual value of music itself. According to the report of Chainalysis, there are a large number of wash trading in the NFT market, which aims to artificially increase the trading volume. Buyers purchase assets based on the circumstances that others will buy rather than the assessment of the music's own value.

==== NFT ownership ====
Legal scholars such as Guadamuz identified a gap between consumers' beliefs and the law. Buying an NFT allows consumers to own the token representing the music, which differs from owning the copyright to the work itself, unless it's explicitly transferred through a separate off-chain contract. There are other risks as well: the first is the metadata issue. An NFT is simply a digital receipt containing metadata that links to a media file (e.g., a JPEG or MP3). Without the corresponding server, NFT music cannot run, leaving the owner with a token pointing to nothing. Another problem is that, token owners face copyright issues. The case where Quentin Tarantino was sued by Miramax for unauthorized sale of non-identical tokens based on the script of "Pulp Fiction" vividly illustrates this issue. This shows the clash between existing intellectual property laws and the invariability of blockchain technology. The legal meaning of minting an NFT work is underdetermined. Does it count as reproduction, or the communication to the public under current copyright laws?

== Case study: The Korean Paradigm ==
The South Korean market has developed another approach to adopt NFT, though its practice is facing significant controversy. Driven by a digital demographic and well-organized fandom economies, Korea serves as a case study of how such thing can turn into a financial opportunity.

In Western markets, tech platforms and labels remain separate. However, Korean entertainment conglomerates actively merge with technical infrastructure. Major agencies such as HYBE and SM Entertainment have integrated Web3 directly into their corporation, and they are partnering with fintech leaders such as Dunamu and Binance.

These companies have adopted different ways to integrate platforms and brands. After cooperating with Dunamu, HYBE launched Momentica and renamed NFTs to “Momentica” to solve environmental problems. Despite the use of low-energy blockchain to solve the sustainability problem, the project was resisted by the online community (e.g., “#ARMYsAgainstNFT”). Here, the contradiction between corporate financialisation and the emotions of real fans is highlighted. Another company, SM Entertainment, has adopted the strategy of building the world. It launched a “Play-to-Create (P2C)” ecosystem. By incentivizing user-generated content with tokens, they aim to legitimize NFTs within a broader range rather than as speculative assets. Modhaus (tripleS), unlike the above companies, launched a major change in governance and operates under a DAO model. Fans can collect NFT photocards ("Objekts") to obtain voting tokens ("COMO"), and these behaviours give them the legal right to vote for the release of songs. As discussed in Section 4.1.2, this changes the role of fans from consumers to active decision-makers

From the experience of the K model, it can be seen that successful NFT integration requires an interactive experience, not a simple asset speculation. Nevertheless, the combination also faces limitation: fandoms resist when emotional interactions are perceived as being aggressively monetized.

== See also ==
- Non-fungible token
- Blockchain
- Music industry
- Music streaming service
- Decentralization
- Platformization
- Fandom
