= Stamp on It (song) =

Single by Got the Beat

from the album Stamp on It
- Language: Korean
- Released: January 16, 2023
- Studio: SM Booming System (Seoul)
- Genre: R&B; hip-hop; dance
- Length: 3:53
- Label: SM; Dreamus
- Composers: Dem Jointz; Yoo Young-jin; Tayla Parx
- Lyricist: Yoo Young-jin

Got the Beat singles chronology
"Step Back" (2022)	"Stamp on It" (2023)

Music video
- "Stamp on It" on YouTube

"Stamp on It" is a song recorded by South Korean supergroup Got the Beat for their first extended play of the same name. It was released as the EP's lead single by SM Entertainment on January 16, 2023. The song was not commercially successful, debuting and peaking at only number 80 on the Circle Digital Chart.

== Background and release ==
On December 23, 2022, SM Entertainment announced Got the Beat would be releasing a new song in January 2023. On December 29, it was announced they would be releasing their first extended play titled Stamp on It with lead single of the same name on January 16, 2023. On January 2, 2023, the promotional schedule was released. On January 15, the music video teaser was released. The song was released alongside the extended play and its music video on January 16.

== Composition ==
"Stamp on It" was written, composed, and arranged by Yoo Young-jin alongside Dem Jointz for the composition and arrangement, with Tayla Parx participating in the composition. It described as a R&B and hip-hop-based dance song characterized by "piano and bass rhythm" with lyrics about "expressing the story of reaching the top spot in a fierce stage competition". "Stamp on It" was composed in the key of F minor, with a tempo of 143 beats per minute.

== Music video ==
The music video directed by Hong Jae-hwan, and Lee Hye-su of Swisher was released alongside the song by SM Entertainment on January 16. The "rough and powerful" music video portrays the members "flaunting their collections of luxury cars, jewellery, and fine art" with scenes that switches between their luxury lifestyle and them "performing dynamic choreography" created by Lachica featuring "a signature move portraying a stamping action".

== Commercial performance ==
"Stamp on It" debuted at number 80 on South Korea's Circle Digital Chart in the chart issue dated January 15–21, 2023. In Japan, the song debuted at number 69 on the Billboard Japan Top Download Songs in the chart issue dated January 25, 2023.

== Promotion ==
Prior to the release of Stamp on It, the group performed the song at the SM Town Live 2023: SMCU Palace at Kwangya on January 1, 2023. They subsequently performed the song on January 19, on Mnet's M Countdown, and on the 32nd Seoul Music Awards.

== Credits and personnel ==
Credits adapted from liner notes of Stamp on It.

Studio

- SM Booming System – recording, digital editing, mixing
- Sonic Korea – mastering

Personnel

- SM Entertainment – executive producer
- Lee Soo-man – producer
- Lee Sung-soo – production director, executive supervisor
- Tak Young-jun – executive supervisor
- Got the Beat – vocals, background vocals
- Yoo Young-jin – lyrics, composition, arrangement, vocal directing, background vocals, recording, digital editing, mixing, music and sound supervisor
- Dem Jointz – composition, arrangement
- Tayla Parx – composition
- Jeon Hoon – mastering
- Shin Soo-min – mastering assistant

== Charts ==
=== Weekly charts ===
Weekly chart performance for "Stamp on It"
Chart (2023)	Peak position
Japan Download (Billboard Japan)	69
Singapore Regional (RIAS)	23
South Korea (Circle)	80

=== Monthly charts ===
Monthly chart performance for "Stamp on It"
Chart (2023)	Peak position
South Korea (Circle)	187

== Release history ==
Release history for Stamp on It
Region	Date	Format	Label
Various	January 16, 2023	Digital download; streaming	SM; Dreamus
