= Second (song) =

Single by Hyoyeon featuring Bibi

from the EP Deep
- Language: Korean
- Released: August 9, 2021
- Genre: Dance pop
- Length: 3:53
- Label: SM; Dreamus; ScreaM
- Composers: Melanie Fontana; Gino Barletta; Britten Newbill; Michel Schulz; Bibi
- Lyricists: Jeong Ha-ri; Bibi

Hyoyeon singles chronology
"Dessert" (2020)	"Second" (2021)	"Deep" (2022)

Bibi singles chronology
"Why Y" (2021)	"Second" (2021)	"Galipette" (2021)

Music video
- "Second" on YouTube

"Second" is a song recorded by South Korean singer Hyoyeon featuring Bibi. It was released digitally on August 9, 2021, by SM Entertainment. The song is written by Jeong Ha-ri (153Joombas) and Bibi, composed by Melanie Fontana, Gino Barletta, Britten Newbill, Michel Schulz and Bibi, and arranged by Lindgren. Initially a standalone single, the song was later included on Hyoyeon's first extended play, Deep, released on May 16, 2022.

== Release and composition ==
On August 3, 2021, it was announced that Hyoyeon will be releasing a digital single titled "Second" featuring Bibi. On August 8, the music video teaser was released. A day later, the song together with the music video was released.

"Second" is composed by Bibi, Jeong Ha-ri (153Joombas), Melanie Fontana, Gino Barletta, Britten Newbill, and Michel "Lindgren" Schulz. Musically, the song is described as a summer dance pop song with "light rhythm" and characterized by "electric piano, horn, cowbell, and heavy bass" with lyrics about telling the listener that "it is okay to give themselves time to breathe in their busy life". "Second" was composed in the key of A-flat major, with a tempo of 95 beats per minute.

== Commercial performance ==
"Second" debuted at position 182 on South Korea's Gaon Digital Chart in the chart issue dated August 8–14, 2021. The song then ascended to position 176 in the chart issue dated August 15–21, 2021. The song also debuted at position 28 on Gaon Download Chart in the chart issue dated August 8–14, 2021. The song debuted at position 17 on Billboard World Digital Songs in the chart issue dated August 21, 2021.

== Promotion ==
Prior to the song's release, on August 9, 2021, Hyoyeon held a live event called "HYO 'Second' COUNTDOWN LIVE" on V Live to introduce the song and communicate with her fans. Following the release of the single, she performed "Second" on four music programs: Mnet's M Countdown on August 12, KBS2's Music Bank on August 13, MBC's Show! Music Core on August 14, and SBS's Inkigayo on August 15.

== Credits and personnel ==
Credits adapted from Melon.

Studio

- SM LVYIN Studio – recording, engineering for mix, mixing
- Feelghood Studio – recording
- SM Yellow Tail Studio – Digital editing
- 821 Sound Mastering – mastering

Personnel

- SM Entertainment – Executive producer
- Lee Soo-man – producer
- Yoo Young-jin – Music & sound supervisor
- Hyoyeon – vocals, background vocals
- Bibi – vocals, background vocals, lyrics, composition
- Jeong Ha-ri (153Joombas) – lyrics
- Melanie Fontana – composition
- Gino Barletta – composition
- Britten Newbill – composition
- Michel Schulz – composition
- Lindgren – arrangement
- Kim Yeon-seo – vocal directing, background vocals
- Lee Ji-hong – recording, engineering for mix, mixing
- Park Jae-sun – recording
- Noh Min-ji – digital editing
- Kwon Nam-woo – mastering

== Charts ==
Weekly chart performance for "Second"
Chart (2021)	Peak position
South Korea (Gaon Digital Chart)	176
US World Digital Songs (Billboard)	17

== Release history ==
Release dates and formats for "Weekend"
Region	Date	Format	Label	Ref.
Various	August 9, 2021	Digital download; streaming	SM Entertainment; Dreamus; ScreaM	
