= 32nd Seoul Music Awards =

2023 award ceremony

- Date: January 19, 2023
- Venue: Olympic Gymnastics Arena
- Country: South Korea
- Hosted by: Choi Min-ho; Mijoo; Kim Il-joong
- Website: seoulmusicawards.com

The 32nd Seoul Music Awards (Korean: 32nd 서울가요대상; RR: 32nd Seoul Gayo Daesang) is an award ceremony held on January 19, 2023. It was organized by Sports Seoul and broadcast through KBS Joy and U+Idol Live. The ceremony was hosted by Choi Min-ho, Mijoo, and Kim Il-joong.

== Criteria ==
All songs and albums that are eligible to be nominated must be released from January to December 2022.

| Category | Online voting | Panelist | Music sales | Album sales |
|---|---|---|---|---|
| Main Prize (Bonsang) | 30% | 40% | 30% | |
| Rookie Award | 30% | 40% | 30% | |
| Popularity Award | 100% (Korea Only) | N/A | | |
| Hallyu Special Award | 100% (Overseas Only) | N/A | | |
| Trot Award | 30% | 40% | 30% | |
| Ballad Award | 30% | 40% | 30% | |
| OST Award | 30% | 40% | 30% | |
| R&B Hiphop Award | 30% | 40% | 30% | |
| Best Performance | N/A | 100% | N/A | |
| Band Award | N/A | 100% | N/A | |
| Discovery of the Year | N/A | 100% | N/A | |
| Special Jury Award | N/A | 100% | N/A | |

== Winners and nominees ==
Winners and nominees are listed in alphabetical order. Winners will be listed first and emphasized in bold.

The list of nominees were announced on December 6, 2022, through the official website. Voting opened on Seoul Music Awards mobile application on December 6, 2022, and closed on January 15, 2023.

=== Main awards ===
| Grand Award (Daesang) | Main Award (Bonsang) |
|---|---|
| **NCT Dream**; (G)I-dle; Aespa; Blackpink; BTS; Got the Beat; Ive; Kang Daniel; Kim Ho-joong; Lim Young-woong; Psy; Red Velvet; Seventeen; Stray Kids; Taeyeon; Zico | **(G)I-dle**; **Aespa**; **Blackpink**; **BTS**; **Got the Beat**; **Ive**; **Kang Daniel**; **Kim Ho-joong**; **Lim Young-woong**; **NCT Dream**; **Psy**; **Red Velvet**; **Seventeen**; **Stray Kids**; **Taeyeon**; **Zico**; List of nominated artists: 10cm; Astro; Ateez; Big Bang; Bol4; BtoB; Choi Ye-na; Cravity; Crush; DKZ; Enhypen; Fromis 9; Girls' Generation; Got7; Itzy; J-Hope; Jay Park; Jin; Kihyun; Monsta X; Nayeon; NCT 127; Oneus; P1Harmony; Seulgi; STAYC; Suho; Super Junior; The Boyz; Tomorrow X Together; Treasure; Twice; WEi; Winner |
| Best Song Award | Best Album Award |
| **Ive – "Love Dive"** | **BTS – Proof** |
| Rookie Award | Best Performance |
| **Le Sserafim**; **NewJeans**; **TNX**; ATBO; Billlie; Classy; CSR; H1-Key; Kep1er; Lapillus; Nine.i; Nmixx; TAN; Tempest; Trendz; Viviz; Younite | **(G)I-dle** |
| Popularity Award | Hallyu Special Award |
| **Lim Young-woong**; List of nominated artists: (G)I-dle; 10cm; Aespa; Astro; ATBO; Ateez; Big Bang; Billlie; Blackpink; Bol4; BtoB; BTS; Choi Ye-na; Classy; Cravity; Crush; CSR; DKZ; Enhypen; Fromis 9; Girls' Generation; Got the Beat; Got7; H1-Key; Itzy; Ive; J-Hope; Jay Park; Jin; Kang Daniel; Kep1er; Kihyun; Kim Ho-joong; Lapillus; Le Sserafim; Monsta X; Nayeon; NCT 127; NCT Dream; NewJeans; Nine.i; Nmixx; Oneus; P1Harmony; Psy; Red Velvet; Seulgi; Seventeen; STAYC; Stray Kids; Suho; Super Junior; Taeyeon; TAN; Tempest; The Boyz; TNX; Tomorrow X Together; Treasure; Trendz; Twice; Viviz; WEi; Winner; Younite; Zico | **Suho**; List of nominated artists: (G)I-dle; 10cm; Aespa; Astro; ATBO; Ateez; Big Bang; Billlie; Blackpink; Bol4; BtoB; BTS; Choi Ye-na; Classy; Cravity; Crush; CSR; DKZ; Enhypen; Fromis 9; Girls' Generation; Got the Beat; Got7; H1-Key; Itzy; Ive; J-Hope; Jay Park; Jin; Kang Daniel; Kep1er; Kihyun; Kim Ho-joong; Lapillus; Le Sserafim; Lim Young-woong; Monsta X; Nayeon; NCT 127; NCT Dream; NewJeans; Nine.i; Nmixx; Oneus; P1Harmony; Psy; Red Velvet; Seulgi; Seventeen; STAYC; Stray Kids; Super Junior; Taeyeon; TAN; Tempest; The Boyz; TNX; Tomorrow X Together; Treasure; Trendz; Twice; Viviz; WEi; Winner; Younite; Zico |

=== Genre-based awards ===
| Trot Award | Ballad Award |
|---|---|
| **Young Tak**; Jang Min-ho; Jang Yoon-jeong; Jeong Dong-won; Kim Hee-jae; Kim Tae-yeon; Lim Young-woong; Na Huna; Song Ga-in | **Younha**; Ben; Davichi; Han Dong-geun; Juho; Kassy; KyoungSeo; Lim Jae-hyun; Kang Min-kyung & Jannabi; Monday Kiz; Noel; Paul Kim; Tei; Tophyun; V.O.S |
| OST Award | R&B Hiphop Award |
| **MeloMance**; 10cm; Bibi; Davichi; Heize; Jimin & Ha Sung-woon; Lee Seok-hoon; Lee Seung-yoon; Lee Sun-hee; Lim Young-woong; Sam Kim; Sunwoo Jung-a; Taeil; Tiger JK; Wheein; Wonstein | **Be'O**; **Big Naughty**; Coogie; Epik High; Jessi; Joosiq; Leellamarz & Toil; Punch; Woo & Meenoi |

=== Other awards ===
| New Wave Star | World Best Artist |
|---|---|
| **Kep1er**; **Lapillus**; **TAN** | **Psy** |
| Discovery of the Year | Band Award |
| **Lee Seung-yoon** | **Jannabi** |
| K-pop Special Award | Legend Artist |
| **Kara** | **BoA** |
| idol+ New Star Award | idol+ Best Star Award |
| **Tempest** | **BTS** |

=== Multiple awards ===
The following artist(s) received three or more awards:

| Awards | Artist(s) |
|---|---|
| 3 | BTS |

== Presenters ==
The list of presenters was announced on January 9, 2023.

Order of the presentation, name of the artist(s), and award(s) they presented
| Order | Artist(s) | Presented |
|---|---|---|
| 1 | Bae Da-bin and Yoo Seon-ho | New Wave Star + Trot Award |
| 2 | Moon Sang-min and Jung Eun-hye | OST Award |
| 3 | Park Yong-taik | World Best Artist Award |
| 4 | Kim Ji-min and Park Byung-eun | Discovery of the Year + Ballad Award |
| 5 | Hwang In-youp | Band Award |
| 6 | Chae Jong-hyeop and Park Se-wan | Rookie of the Year |
| 7 | Roh Jeong-eui and Byun Woo-seok | Main Award (Bonsang) |
| 8 | Aiki | R&B Hiphop Award |
| 9 | Kim Jae-young and Kim So-won | Main Award (Bonsang) |
| 10 | Kim Ye-won and Seo In-guk | K-pop Special Award |
| 11 | Gong Seung-yeon and Kim Bum | Main Award (Bonsang) |
| 12 | Rihey | idol+ New Star Award + idol+ Best Star Award |
| 13 | Im Soo-hyang and High1 Resort's CEO Lee Sam-geol | Best Performance + Popularity Award + Hallyu Special Award |
| 14 | Hwang Bo-ra and Sung Joon | Main Award (Bonsang) |
| 15 | Lee Sun-bin and Busan World Expo 2030 Secretary General's Yoon Sang-jik | Legend Artist |
| 15 | Ahn Bo-hyun | Best Song Award + Best Album Award |
| 16 | Choi Ji-woo and Seoul Music Awards' Chairman Kim Soo-chul | Grand Award (Daesang) |

== Performers ==
Order of the performance, name of the artist(s), and song(s) they performed
| Order | Artist(s) | Song performed |
|---|---|---|
| 1 | CocaNButter | "I Know" + "The Angel Who Lost Wings" + "Kung Ddari Sha Bah Rah" + "No. 1" + "10 Minutes" + "Growl" + "Boy with Luv" |
| 1 | TNX | "Mr. Simple" + "Gangnam Style" |
| 2 | Young Tak | "Why are you coming out from there" + "Jjiniya" + "Mmm" |
| 3 | MeloMance | "Invitation" + "Love, Maybe" |
| 4 | Younha | "Event Horizon" |
| 5 | TNX | "Move" |
| 6 | Psy | "That That" |
| 7 | Jannabi | "Grippin'TheGreen" + "For Lovers Who Hesitate" |
| 8 | Lee Seung-yoon | "Open Your Textbook" |
| 9 | Big Naughty (with Team NY, Roh Yoon-ha, Khan, Next G, and Holy Bang) | "New Era (Prod. BMTJ)" |
| 10 | Be'O | "Love Me" |
| 11 | Kim Ho-joong | "Phantasmagoria" + "Il mare calmo della sera" |
| 12 | (G)I-dle | "My Bag" + "Tomboy" |
| 13 | Zico | "Freak" + "New Thing (Feat. Homies)" |
| 14 | Kara | "Lupin" + "Step" + "Pandora" + "Damaged Lady" + "Mamma Mia!" + "Mister" + "When I Move" |
| 15 | Kang Daniel | "Upside Down" + "Nirvana" |
| 16 | Ive | "Love Dive" + "After Like" |
| 17 | NCT Dream | "Candy" + "Beatbox" + "Glitch Mode" |
| 18 | Got the Beat | "Stamp on It" |

== Broadcast ==
| Region | Network/Platform | Ref. |
|---|---|---|
| South Korea | KBS Joy; U+Idol Live | |
| Various | Paravi; Mahcast; Yippi; U+Idol Live | |
