= Step Back (Got the Beat song) =

Single by Got the Beat
- Language: Korean
- Released: January 3, 2022
- Studio: SM Booming System
- Genre: Hip hop; R&B
- Length: 3:48
- Label: SM; Dreamus
- Composers: Yoo Young-jin; Dwayne Abernathy Jr; Taylor Monet Parks; Ryan Jhun
- Lyricist: Yoo Young-jin

Got the Beat singles chronology
"Step Back" (2022)	"Stamp on It" (2023)

Stage video
- "Step Back" on YouTube

"Step Back" is the debut single recorded by South Korean supergroup Got the Beat, the first unit of South Korean project group Girls on Top. It was released digitally on January 3, 2022 by SM Entertainment. Described as a "hip-hop R&B song", it was written by Yoo Young-jin, who also composed it with Dwayne Abernathy Jr., Taylor Monet Parks, and Ryan Jhun. The track is about a woman with high self-esteem warning another woman away from approaching her lover.

"Step Back" was met with mostly negative reviews from music critics, with its lyrical content being universally panned. Commercially, it peaked at number four on the Circle Digital Chart, number five on the US World Digital Songs chart, and number 116 on the Billboard Global 200.

== Background and composition ==
On December 26, 2021, SM Entertainment launched a new female project group called Girls on Top, along with its first unit Got the Beat. The first teaser image of the unit was released through Girls on Top and SM Town's official social media accounts. From December 28 to 29, teaser images were released for each individual group member (in order: BoA, Taeyeon, Seulgi, Winter, Hyoyeon, Wendy, Karina).

"Step Back"
"Step Back" is a bass-heavy, hip-hop R&B song incorporating dubstep, hip-hop, and electro house elements.

"Step Back" was composed by Dwayne Abernathy Jr., Taylor Monet Parks, and Ryan Jhun, along with Yoo Young-jin, who also wrote the Korean lyrics of the song. The song was written by Yoo and was widely known as the SM Music Performance (SMP) representative, which features strong performances and critical social lyrics unique to SM Entertainment. Musically, it was described as an "addictive" hip-hop R&B song with repeated bass and instrument variations. Lim Sun-hee of IZM mentioned the twisted string instrument sound and added that as the chorus progresses, the chaos decreases while noting Yoo Young-jin's chorus appearance and comparing it to the SMP concept of SuperM. Tim Chan of Rolling Stone noted the dubstep, hip-hop, and electro house elements incorporated in the bass-heavy track with Got the Beat "alternating between singing, rapping, and a cheerleader chant-style chorus". The song was also noted for the group's "unique" vocals and "solid" singing skills that enhanced the "perfection" of the single. It is composed in the key of C-sharp major, with a tempo of 162 beats per minute. The lyrics contain "straightforward" expressions of a woman with high self-esteem in love with her lover.

== Critical reception ==
Professional ratings
Review scores
Source	Rating
IZM	1.5/5 stars

"Step Back" was met with mostly negative reviews from music critics, who panned its lyrical content but was favorable towards the group's vocals. Kim Soo-jung of No Cut News complimented the group's vocals but condemned the lyrics for being misogynistic. Gelene Peñalosa of Inquirer Pop! described the track as a "gaslight, gatekeep, girlboss" anthem and condemned the song's lyricist as she describes it as "very anti-feminist and gives off a very strong feeling of being written by a man". Tamar Herman of South China Morning Post called it a "stereotypical and anti-feminist" song, even adding that South Korean music critic Jung Min-jae suggested that the lyrics be rewritten and the single re-released. Cho Hye-jin of Xports News wrote that the lyrics "left a sense of disappointment", while Lim Sun-hee of IZM criticized the lyrics for being full of "rambling and demeaning" narratives and rated the song 1.5 stars out of 5.

Benedetta Geddo of Teen Vogue called it a "swagger-filled" song that showcases the group's "impeccable" vocals we are used to hearing from SM Entertainment artists. Haley Yang of Korea JoongAng Daily pointed out the track's melody as it was "seeing overwhelmingly positive reviews as members flaunt impressive high notes" but noted that many fans were "perplexed" as to why the song was introduced as a "girl power anthem". Yang also indicated the responses of fans to such lamenting that "everything is perfect except the lyrics", "mentioning male attention to validate their confidence", and calling the lyrics "so out-of-trend" and "anachronistic". She noted the song's "internalized misogyny by antagonizing another woman and accusing her of being flirtatious", thus perpetuating the age-old phrase "women are women's worst enemies".

Mary Siroky of Consequence described the track as "less of an empowerment anthem" and noted that it had seemingly left many fans "disappointed" from what the group was marketed for.

== Commercial performance ==
"Step Back" debuted at number 24 on South Korea's Gaon Digital Chart in the chart issue dated January 2–8, 2022, ascending to number 14 in the chart issue dated January 9–15, 2022. The song debuted at number 77 on the Billboard K-pop Hot 100 in the chart issue dated January 15, 2022. The song then ascended to number 15 in the chart issue dated January 29, 2022. In Japan, the song debuted at number 69 on the Billboard Japan Japan Hot 100 in the chart issue dated January 12, 2022.

In New Zealand, the song debuted at number 19 on RMNZ Hot Singles in the chart issue dated January 10, 2022. In Indonesia, the song debuted and peaked at number 12 on the Billboard Indonesia Songs in the chart issue dated February 19, 2022. In Singapore, the song debuted at number 14 on RIAS's Top Streaming Chart in the chart issue dated January 7–13, 2022. It also debuted at number 13 on the RIAS Top Regional Chart in the chart issue dated December 31, 2021 – January 6, 2022, peaking at number seven in the chart issued a week later. In Vietnam, the song debuted at number 24 on the Billboard Vietnam Hot 100 in the chart issue dated January 14, 2022, peaking at number 19 in the chart issued a week later.

In the United States, the song debuted at number five on the Billboard World Digital Song Sales in the chart issue dated January 15, 2022. Globally, the song debuted at number 126 on the Billboard Global 200 in the chart issue dated January 15, 2022, peaking at number 122 in the chart issue dated January 22, 2022. It also debuted at number 87 on the Billboard Global Excl. US in the chart issue dated January 15, 2022, peaking at number 69 in the chart issued a week later.

== Promotion ==
A scene in the stage video, where Got the Beat is dancing with spotlight distributed evenly to the members

On January 1, 2022, Got the Beat unveiled their first "Step Back" performance stage at the SM Town Live 2022: SMCU Express at Kwangya. For the performance, choreography by Kiel Tutin, ReiNa, and Kyle Hanagami, who have worked with Jennifer Lopez and Britney Spears, was commissioned. The first stage video performance of the song was released after the concert and was posted on YouTube. It starts with the group's faces covered with their arms as the members look back and dance until their part. The members have also "actively" utilized pair choreography, naturally flows into group choreography, and distribute spotlights evenly so that no one is suppressed. With that, Kim Soo-jung of No Cut News praised the camera work of the SM for maximizing the strength of the stage video. The song's stage video features the "powerful" vocals of Taeyeon, Wendy, and Winter, along with the dance break of BoA, Hyoyeon, and Seulgi, adding Hyoyeon and Karina's "individualistic rap". Moon Soo-ji of Inews24 noted the "heated" response the group was receiving by releasing the stage video and praising it for being a "thorough" video with "perfect vocal, dance, and rap skills", drawing admiration. Before their first performance, SM Entertainment also released a practice video of the group. The group performed the song on Mnet's M Countdown on January 27, 2022.

== Accolades ==
"Step Back" received three music program awards, winning on Inkigayo (January 30 and February 20, 2022), and on M Countdown (February 3, 2022). It received nominations for Best Song of January at the 12th Circle Chart Music Awards and Digital Song Bonsang at the 37th Golden Disc Awards. Cosmopolitan ranked it the 8th best K-pop song of the year while Her Campus named it the 13th best K-pop girl group song of the year. Teen Vogue included it in their list of The 79 Best K-Pop Songs of 2022.

== Credits and personnel ==
Credits adapted from Joox and Melon.

Studio

- SM Booming System – recording, digital editing, mixing
- Sonic Korea – mastering

Personnel

- Got the Beat (BoA, Taeyeon, Hyoyeon, Seulgi, Wendy, Karina, Winter) – vocals
- Yoo Young-jin – lyrics, composition, arrangement, vocal directing, background vocals, recording, digital editing, mixing, music and sound supervisor
- Dwayne Abernathy Jr. – composition, arrangement
- Taylor Monet Parks – composition
- Ryan Jhun – composition, arrangement
- Jeon Hoon – mastering
- Shin Soo-min – mastering assistant

== Charts ==
=== Weekly charts ===
Weekly chart performance for "Step Back"
Chart (2022)	Peak position
Global 200 (Billboard)	116
Indonesia (Billboard)	12
Japan (Japan Hot 100)	69
Malaysia (Billboard)	19
New Zealand Hot Singles (RMNZ)	19
Singapore (RIAS)	19
South Korea (Gaon)	4
South Korea (K-pop Hot 100)	6
South Korea (Billboard)	22
US World Digital Songs (Billboard)	5
Vietnam (Vietnam Hot 100)	19

=== Monthly charts ===
Monthly chart performance for "Step Back"
Chart (February 2022)	Peak position
South Korea (Gaon)	5

=== Year-end charts ===
Year-end chart performance for "Step Back"
Chart (2022)	Position
South Korea (Circle)	53

== Release history ==
Release history for "Step Back"
Region	Date	Format(s)	Label(s)	Ref.
Various	January 3, 2022	Digital download; streaming	SM; Dreamus	

== See also ==
- List of Inkigayo Chart winners (2022)
- List of M Countdown Chart winners (2022)
