= Got the Beat =

South Korean girl group

- Official logo

Background information
- Origin: Seoul, South Korea
- Genre: K-pop
- Years active: 2022–2023
- Label: SM
- Spinoff of: Girls' Generation; Red Velvet; Aespa
- Members: BoA; Taeyeon; Hyoyeon; Seulgi; Wendy; Karina; Winter
- Website: Official website

Got the Beat (Korean: 갓더비트; stylized as GOT the beat) is a South Korean supergroup and first sub-unit of project group Girls On Top. Formed by SM Entertainment in 2022, composed of seven female artists who already debuted under the agency: soloist BoA, Taeyeon and Hyoyeon from Girls' Generation, Seulgi and Wendy from Red Velvet, and Karina and Winter from Aespa.

== History ==
=== Background ===
All members of Got the Beat are part of SM Entertainment's recording artists lineup. BoA had been an active artist since the age of 13, when she debuted as a soloist in 2000. Taeyeon and Hyoyeon debuted as members of Girls' Generation in 2007, and as members of Girls' Generation's second sub-unit Oh!GG in 2018. Taeyeon is also a member of Girls' Generation's first sub-unit Girls' Generation-TTS since 2012. Taeyeon and Hyoyeon have been soloists since 2015 and 2016, respectively. Seulgi and Wendy debuted as members of Red Velvet in 2014. Seulgi is a member of Red Velvet's sub-unit Red Velvet – Irene & Seulgi since 2020, while Wendy and Seulgi both debuted as soloists in 2021 and 2022, respectively. Karina and Winter debuted as members of Aespa in 2020.

=== 2021–present: Formation, debut with "Step Back", and Stamp On It ===
SM Entertainment announced the launch of the project group Girls On Top and its first sub-unit Got the Beat on December 27, 2021, with Got the Beat focusing on intense dance songs and performances. On December 28, 2021, it was announced that the group's debut single "Step Back" would be released on January 3, 2022. The song peaked at number 4 on the Gaon Digital Chart and at number 5 on the Billboard World Digital Songs Chart. The group unveiled their first "Step Back" performance stage at the SM Town Live 2022: SMCU Express at Kwangya on January 1, before making their official broadcast debut on music program M Countdown almost a month later. Got the Beat won their first music show award on SBS' Inkigayo on January 30.

On December 29, 2022, it was announced that Got the Beat's first extended play Stamp on It would be released on January 16, 2023.

== Members ==
- BoA (보아)
- Taeyeon (태연) (Girls' Generation)
- Hyoyeon (효연) (Girls' Generation)
- Seulgi (슬기) (Red Velvet)
- Wendy (웬디) (Red Velvet)
- Karina (카리나) (Aespa)
- Winter (윈터) (Aespa)

== Discography ==
=== Extended plays ===
List of extended plays, showing selected details, selected chart positions, and sales figures
Title	Details	Peak chart positions		Sales
Title	Details	KOR	JPN	Sales
Stamp on It	Released: January 16, 2023; Label: SM Entertainment; Formats: CD, digital download, streaming, SMC	3	27	KOR: 171,335; JPN: 2,583 (Phy.)

=== Singles ===
List of singles, showing year released, selected chart positions, and name of the album
Title	Year	Peak chart positions								Album
Title	Year	KOR Circle	KOR Hot	JPN Hot	NZ Hot	SGP	US World	VIE Hot	WW	Album
"Step Back"	2022	4	6	69	19	19	5	19	116	Non-album single
"Stamp on It"	2023	80	—	— (Note: "Stamp on It" did not enter the Japan Hot 100, but debuted and peaked at number 69 on the Billboard Japan Download Songs chart.)	—	— (Note: "Stamp on It" did not appear on the RIAS Top International Streaming chart, but it peaked at number 23 on the Top Regional Streaming chart.)	—	—	—	Stamp on It
"—" denotes a recording that did not chart or was not released in that territory

== Videography ==
=== Music videos ===
Title	Year	Director(s)	Ref.
"Stamp on It"	2023	Swisher	

=== Other videos ===
Title	Year	Director(s)	Ref.
"'Step Back' Stage Video"	2022	Lucid color	
"'Stamp on It' Stage Video"	2023	Unknown	

== Concerts ==
=== Concert participation ===
- SM Town Live 2022: SMCU Express at Kwangya (2022)
- SM Town Live 2022: SMCU Express (2022)
- SM Town Live 2023: SMCU Palace at Kwangya (2023)

== Awards and nominations ==
Name of the award ceremony, year presented, category, nominee of the award, and the result of the nomination
Award ceremony	Year	Category	Nominee / Work	Result	Ref.
Circle Chart Music Awards	2023	Artist of the Year – Global Digital Music (January)	"Step Back"	Nominated	
Golden Disc Awards	2023	Digital Bonsang	"Step Back"	Nominated	
Seoul Music Awards	2023	Bonsang Award	Got the Beat	Won	
Seoul Music Awards	2023	Daesang Award	Got the Beat	Nominated	
Seoul Music Awards	2023	K-Wave Popularity Award	Got the Beat	Nominated	
Seoul Music Awards	2023	Popularity Award	Got the Beat	Nominated	
