= Where Is Mr. Kim =

- Genre: Reality; Mystery; Variety
- Starring: Season 2: Lee Sang-min; Jeong Hyeong-don; Kim Dong-hyun; Hyoyeon; Season 1: Lee Sang-min; Jeong Hyeong-don; Jeong Jin-woon; DinDin
- Country of origin: South Korea
- Original language: Korean
- No. of seasons: 2
- No. of episodes: 15

Production
- Production location: South Korea
- Running time: 75 minutes

Original release
- Network: tvN
- Release: October 7, 2017 – April 12, 2018

Where Is Mr. Kim (Korean: 김무명을 찾아라) is a South Korean television program that airs on tvN. Before starting out as a regular variety show, 2 pilot episodes were aired on 7 and 8 October at 19:40 (KST).

Season 1 was broadcast on every Saturday at 19:40 (KST) from 18 November 2017 to 23 December 2017.

On 1 February 2018, it was announced that Season 2 of the show has been confirmed, with Lee Sang-min and Jeong Hyeong-don to remain while mixed martial artist Kim Dong-hyun and Girls' Generation's Hyoyeon will replace Season 1 regular cast Jeong Jin-woon and DinDin. It will be on broadcast every Thursday at 20:10 (KST) from 1 March 2018.

== Program ==
Where Is Mr.Kim is South Korea's first ever infiltration mystery variety show where unknown actors/actresses showcase themselves with their acting skills. In each episode, the instigator, which is usually an experienced and more known actor/actress, will bring in a few unknown actors/actresses that are juniors to the instigator. The instigator will set up a situated theme and these unknown actors/actresses will blend in to it with other people who are genuinely based on it. The cast of star investigators will together experience the theme with the group and identify who are the actors/actresses among the group. If the cast cannot find all the unknown actors/actresses, the instigator wins the game.

In Season 2, the instigator will no longer be of an experienced, more known actor/actress.

== Cast ==
- Lee Sang-min (Pilot episodes 1–2, Season 1-2)
- Jeong Hyeong-don (Pilot episodes 1–2, Season 1-2)
- Kim Dong-hyun (Season 2)
- Hyoyeon (Girls' Generation) (Season 2)

=== Former ===
- Sleepy (Pilot episode 1)
- Jeong Jin-woon (Pilot episodes 1–2, Season 1)
- DinDin (Pilot episode 2, Season 1)

== Episodes ==
=== Pilot Episodes ===
Episode #	Broadcast Date	Theme	Instigator	Unknown Actors/Actresses	Note(s)
1	October 7, 2017	Temple	Choi Soo-jong	Ji Hyuk, Choi Nak-kwon, Lee Jun-nyeong	
2	October 8, 2017	Song and Dance Troupe	Park Chul-min	Park Geon-hee, Chae Yoo-ri, Lee Ji-sook	

=== Season 1 ===
Episode #	Broadcast Date	Theme	Instigator	Unknown Actors/Actresses	Note(s)
1	November 18, 2017	Aquarium	Choi Min-soo	Kim Min-cheol, Go Ye-rin, Seo Jeong-hoon	
2	November 25, 2017	Police Station	Jeong Bo-seok	Lee Jong-min, Kim Gi-tae, Kim Hyun-chang	
3	December 2, 2017	Airline Company	Kim Jung-tae	Park Ki-hoon, Jeong Min-ji, Kim Woo-joo	
4	December 9, 2017	Wrestling	Ryu Seung-soo	Kim Dong-gil, Woo Jae-hwa, Lee Kang-ryeol	
5	December 16, 2017	Mountain Rescue	Cho Jae-hyun	Choi Won-joon, Cha Seung-ho	
6	December 23, 2017	Curling	Jang Young-nam	Sun A-rin, Ha Jung-min	

=== Season 2 ===
Episode #	Broadcast Date	Theme	Unknown Actors/Actresses	Note(s)
1	March 1, 2018	Marine Police	Lee Ji-hyuk, Kim Yoon-bae	—
2	March 8, 2018	Hanok Guest House	Noh Joo-yeon, Kim Beom-yeon	Guest Investigator: Park Chul-min
3	March 15, 2018	Idol Agency	Kang Byung-hee, Kim Hye-ji	Guest Investigator: Han Eun-jung; Special guest appearance by Jeonghwa (EXID)
4	March 22, 2018	House of Natural Person	Myung Do-jin, Na Dae-han, Jeon Hong-ryeol, Heo In-goo	Guest Investigator: Ilhoon (BtoB); Special mission: Find the genuine natural person
5	March 29, 2018	News Agency (Reporter)	Yoon Hwa-kyung, Ahn So-yo	Guest Investigator: Sayuri Fujita; Special guest appearance by Samuel
6	April 5, 2018	Agriculture Life Science High School	Kwon Soon-woo, Seo Jeong-rok	Guest Investigator: Oh Na-mi
7	April 12, 2018	Horse Ranch at Jeju	Joo Young-ho, Sung Geun-woo	

== Ratings ==
In the ratings below, the highest rating for the show will be in red, and the lowest rating for the show will be in blue each year.

=== Season 1 ===
Ep. #	Broadcast date	Average audience share		
Ep. #	Broadcast date	AGB Nielsen		TNmS Ratings
Ep. #	Broadcast date	Nationwide	Seoul Capital Area	Nationwide
1	November 18, 2017	1.050%	NR	1.0%
2	November 25, 2017	0.820%	NR	1.1%
3	December 2, 2017	0.842%	NR	1.2%
4	December 9, 2017	1.258%	NR	1.0%
5	December 16, 2017	0.971%	NR	1.0%
6	December 23, 2017	1.094%	NR	0.8%

=== Season 2 ===
Ep. #	Broadcast date	Average audience share		
Ep. #	Broadcast date	AGB Nielsen		TNmS Ratings
Ep. #	Broadcast date	Nationwide	Seoul Capital Area	Nationwide
1	March 1, 2018	1.031%	NR	1.5%
2	March 8, 2018	0.985%	NR	1.1%
3	March 15, 2018	0.4%	NR	1.1%
4	March 22, 2018	1.014%	NR	1.6%
5	March 29, 2018	0.681%	NR	0.8%
6	April 5, 2018	0.5%	NR	0.6%
7	April 12, 2018	0.585%	NR	0.7%

- Note that the show airs on a cable channel (pay TV), which plays part in its slower uptake and relatively small audience share when compared to programs broadcast (FTA) on public networks such as KBS, SBS, MBC or EBS.
- NR rating means "not reported".
