= Deep (EP) =

- Digital and Illusion version cover

EP by Hyoyeon
- Released: May 16, 2022
- Studio: FeelGHood (Seoul); KMIT (Seoul); SM Big Shot (Seoul); SM Blue Ocean (Seoul); SM LVYIN (Seoul); SM SSAM (Seoul); SM Yellow Tail (Seoul)
- Genre: Electronic
- Length: 21:58
- Language: Korean
- Label: SM; ScreaM; Dreamus
- Producer: Lee Soo-man (exec.); Hyoyeon; Sky Adams; Carlyle Fernandes; Richard Beynon; Ummet Ozcan; 3lau; Kago Pengchi; Lindgren; Moonshine

Singles from Deep
- 1. "Deep" Released: May 16, 2022

Deep is the first extended play by South Korean singer Hyoyeon. The extended play was released by SM Entertainment and its sublabel ScreaM Records on May 16, 2022, and contains seven tracks, including standalone singles released from 2018 to 2021, and the lead single of the same name.

== Background and release ==
On May 2, 2022, SM Entertainment announced Hyoyeon will be releasing her first extended play titled Deep on May 16. On May 7, the promotional schedule was released. On May 15, the music video teaser for lead single "Deep" was released. The extended play alongside the music video was released on May 16.

== Composition ==
Deep consists of seven electronic tracks. The lead single "Deep" was described as a dance EDM song with "sharp clap sound and dynamic bass line". "Stupid" was described as a dance-pop song featuring "808 bass slides, and unique and lively beats of percussion instruments" with lyrics about "showing confident attitude in front of those who only talk behind them with evil eyes".

== Promotion ==
Following the extended play's release, on May 16, 2022, Hyoyeon held a live event called "HYO Hyoyeon 'DEEP' Commentary Live" on YouTube to introduce the album and communicate with her fans.

== Track listing ==
Track listing for Deep
No.	Title	Lyrics	Music	Arrangement	Length
1.	"Deep"	Jo Yoon-kyung	Sky Adams; Ashton Nicole Casey; Jonatan Gusmark; Ludvig Evers; Moa "Cazzi Opeia" Carlebecker; Ellen Berg	Sky Adams; Ashton Nicole Casey; Moonshine	2:59
2.	"Stupid"	Kang Eun-jung	Carlyle Fernandes; Ejae; Chikk; Heber Nathaniel Martinez	Carlyle Fernandes; ZSunder	2:52
3.	"Second" (featuring Bibi)	Bibi; Jeong Ha-ri (153/Joombas)	Bibi; Melanie Fontana; Gino Barletta; Britten Newbill; Michel Schulz	Lindgren	3:38
4.	"Dessert" (featuring Loopy and Soyeon)	Lee Seu-ran; Loopy; Soyeon	Jonatan Gusmark; Ludvig Evers; Celine Helgemo; Tooji Sakutan; Hyo; Loopy; Soyeon	Moonshine; Yoo Young-jin	3:20
5.	"Badster"	Zaya (153/Joombas); Lee Eun-ok (Jam Factory)	Hyo; Kago Pengchi; Cazzi Opeia; Ellen Berg Tollbom	Hyo; Kago Pengchi	3:13
6.	"Punk Right Now" (with 3lau)	Le'mon; Jo Yoon-kyung	Hyo; Cazzi Opeia; Jon Eyden; Jonatan Gusmark; Ludvig Evers; Justin Blau	Hyo; Moonshine; Justin Blau	2:58
7.	"Sober" (featuring Ummet Ozcan)	Agnes Shin	Hyo; Ummet Ozcan; Lena Leon; Aurora Pfeiffer; Ryan Henderson; Richard Beynon	Hyo; Ummet Ozcan; Ryan Henderson; Richard Beynon	2:58
Total length:					21:58

== Charts ==
=== Weekly charts ===
Chart performance for Deep
Chart (2022)	Peak position
South Korean Albums (Gaon)	13

=== Monthly charts ===
Monthly chart performance for Deep
Chart (2022)	Peak position
South Korean Albums (Gaon)	49

== Credits and personnel ==
Credits adapted from EP's liner notes.

Studio

- SM LVYIN Studio – recording (track 1, 3, 5), engineered for mix (track 3, 5), mixing (track 3)
- SM SSAM Studio – recording (track 1), digital editing (track 1–2), engineered for mix (track 1)
- SM Yellow Tail Studio – recording (track 2, 4), digital editing (track 3–4)
- Feelghood Studio – recording (track 3)
- KMIT Studio – recording (track 4)
- SM Blue Ocean Studio – recording (track 6)
- SM Big Shot Studio – recording (track 7), engineered for mix (track 4), mixing (track 2)
- SM Starlight Studio – digital editing (track 2), engineered for mix (track 2)
- Sound Pool Studio – digital editing (track 5)
- Golden Bell Tree Sound – digital editing (track 6)
- SM Concert Hall Studio – mixing (track 1)
- SM Blue Cup Studio – mixing (track 4)
- 821 Sound – mastering (track 1–4)
- Sterling Sound – mastering (track 5)

Personnel

- SM Entertainment – executive producer
- Lee Soo-man – producer
- Lee Sung-soo – production director, executive supervisor
- Tak Young-jun – executive supervisor
- Hyoyeon – producer (track 5–7), vocals (all tracks), composition (track 4–7), arrangement (track 5–7), background vocals (all tracks)
- Jo Yoon-kyung – lyrics (track 1, 6)
- Ashton Nicole Casey – composition, arrangement (track 1)
- Moa "Cazzi Opeia" Carlebecker – composition (track 1, 5–6), background vocals (track 5–6)
- Ellen Berg – composition (track 1, 5), background vocals (track 5)
- Sky Adams – producer (track 1), composition, arrangement (track 1)
- Jonatan Gusmark (Moonshine) – producer (track 1, 4, 6), composition, arrangement (track 1, 4, 6)
- Ludvig Evers (Moonshine) – producer (track 1, 4, 6), composition, arrangement (track 1, 4, 6)
- Kang Eun-jung – lyrics (track 2)
- Carlyle Fernandes – producer (track 2), composition, arrangement (track 2)
- Rodnae "Chikk" Bell – composition (track 2)
- EJAE – composition, background vocals (track 2)
- Heber Nathaniel "ZSunder" Martinez – composition, arrangement (track 2)
- Bibi – vocals, lyrics, composition, background vocals (track 3)
- Jeong Ha-ri (153/Joombas) – lyrics (track 3)
- Melanie Fontana – composition (track 3)
- Gino Barletta – composition (track 3)
- Britten Newbill – composition (track 3)
- Michel "Lindgren" Schulz – producer (track 3), composition, arrangement (track 3)
- Loopy – vocals, lyrics, composition, vocal directing, background vocals, recording (track 4)
- Soyeon – vocals, lyrics, composition, background vocals (track 4)
- Lee Seu-ran – lyrics (track 4)
- Celine Helgemo – composition, background vocals (track 4)
- Tooji Sakutan – composition (track 4)
- Yoo Young-jin – arrangement (track 4), music and sound supervisor (all tracks)
- Zaya (153/Joombas) – lyrics (track 5)
- Lee Eun-ok (Jam Factory) – lyrics (track 5)
- Kago Pengchi – producer (track 5), composition, arrangement, mixing (track 5)
- Le'mon – lyrics (track 6)
- Jon Eyden – composition (track 6)
- Justin "3lau" Blau – producer (track 6), performer, composition, arrangement, mixing, mastering (track 6)
- Agnes Shin – lyrics (track 7)
- Lena Leon – composition, background vocals (track 7)
- Aurora Pfeiffer – composition (track 7)
- Ryan Henderson – composition, arrangement (track 7)
- Ummet Ozcan – producer (track 7), performer, composition, arrangement, mixing, mastering (track 7)
- Richard "Bynon" Beynon – producer (track 7), composition, arrangement (track 7)
- Kriz – vocal directing, background vocals (track 1)
- Emily Kim Yeon-seo – vocal directing (track 2–4), background vocals (track 2–3)
- Rick Bridges – vocal directing (track 1–2)
- G-High – vocal directing (track 5, 7), digital editing (track 7)
- Kim Jin-hwan – vocal directing (track 6)
- Lee Ji-hong – recording (track 1, 3, 5), engineered for mix (track 3, 5), mixing (track 3)
- Kang Eun-ji – recording (track 1), digital editing (track 1–2), engineered for mix (track 1)
- Noh Min-ji – recording (track 2, 4), digital editing (track 3–4)
- Park Jae-sun – recording (track 3)
- Kim Cheol-sun – recording (track 6)
- Lee Min-kyu – recording (track 7), engineered for mix (track 4), mixing (track 2)
- Jeong Yoo-ra – digital editing (track 2), engineered for mix (track 2)
- Jeong Ho-jin – digital editing (track 5)
- Hong Seong-jun – digital editing (track 6)
- Nam Koong-jin – mixing (track 1)
- Jung Eui-seok – mixing (track 4)
- Kwon Nam-woo – mastering (track 1–4)
- Chris Gehringer – mastering (track 5)

== Release history ==
Release history for Deep
Region	Date	Format	Label
South Korea	May 16, 2022	CD	SM; ScreaM; Dreamus
Various	May 16, 2022	Digital download; streaming	SM; ScreaM; Dreamus
