= TAN (group) =

South Korean boy band

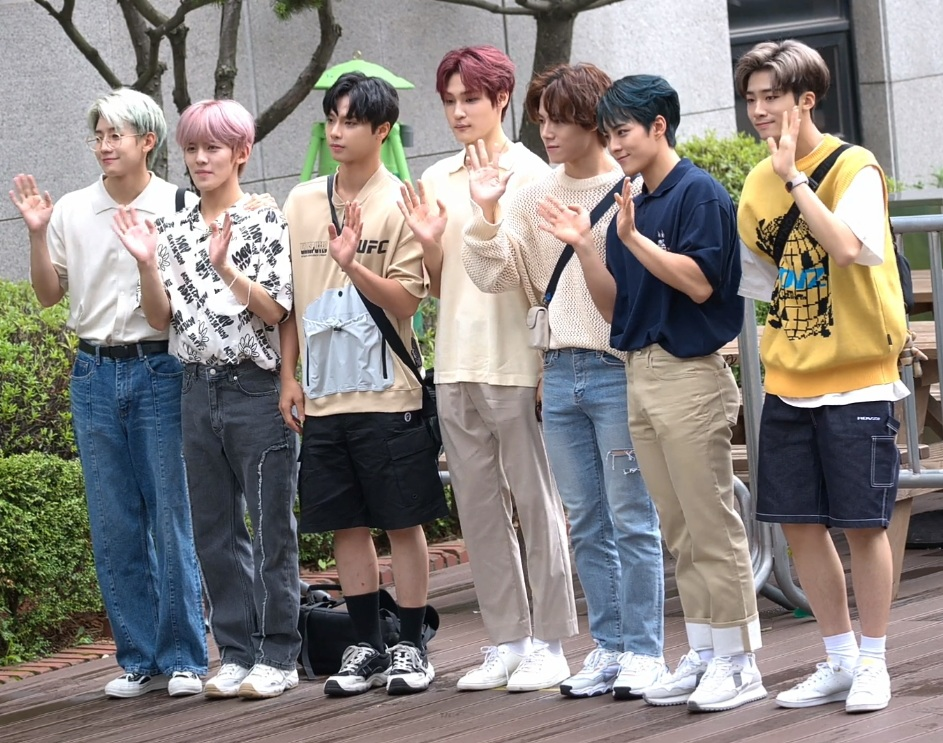
- TAN in July 2022

Background information
- Origin: Seoul, South Korea
- Genres: K-pop
- Years active: 2021– 2024
- Labels: Think
- Past members: Changsun; Jooan; Jaejun; Sunghyuk; Hyunyeop; Taehoon; Jiseong

TAN (Korean: 티에이엔; formerly Korean: 탄; acronym for To All Nations) was a South Korean boy band formed through the MBC survival competition show Extreme Debut: Wild Idol in 2021. The group was consisted of seven members: Changsun, Jooan, Jaejun, Sunghyuk, Hyunyeop, Taehoon, and Jiseong. They debuted on March 10, 2022, with the extended play 1TAN.

== History ==
=== Pre-debut: The Wild Idol and several performances ===
TAN was formed through the survival competition show The Wild Idol, which was aired from September 17, 2021, until December 16, 2021. Out of initially forty-five contestants, only the top seven would be included in the final debut lineup.

Prior to appearing on the program, most of the members had already been active in the entertainment industry. Lee Jae-jun debuted in 2012 as a member of C-Clown under the stage name Maru, until the group disbanded in 2015. He then debuted with TREI in 2019, which later disbanded the next year and made his debut once again as one half of the duo JT&Marcus in 2021. Lee Chang-sun joined 24K in 2016. They were both contestants in Mix Nine, but neither of them made the final lineup; the latter was eliminated in the first round, placing at 105th overall, while the former was eliminated in the final round. After finished at 31st place in Produce 101 Season 2, Seo Sung-hyuk made his debut in project group Rainz in 2017 until the group conclude its activities a year later. Im Joo-an debuted with We in the Zone in 2019 until the group disbanded in 2021. Bang Tae-hoon briefly appeared in Cap-Teen. Kim Ji-seong is a member of NTX, they debuted in early 2021.

On December 29, 2021, TAN had their first live stage performance with the song "Diving to the Top" on 2021 MBC Entertainment Awards. Two days later, they performed "Last Chance" on MBC Gayo Daejejeon. TAN performed the song once again on their first music show broadcast on MBC's Show! Music Core on January 8, 2022. They then had their first busking at Taebaek Gowon Gymnasium on January 16.

=== 2022: Debut with 1TAN, 2TAN, Dream & Deurim, and overseas promotions ===
On February 28, 2022, Think Entertainment released a promotional timetable announcing TAN's debut with their first extended play 1TAN on March 10. As per the planned date, the EP with the lead single "Du Du Du" and its music video was released. TAN also had a debut showcase at Yonsei University's Centennial Hall on the same day. The following day, Think Entertainment announced that Jaejun will be a special host on Show! Music Core for two weeks starting on February 12. On the same day, TAN had their debut stage on KBS2's Music Bank.

On May 22, TAN had their second busking at Pohang Space Walk. After performing, they announced that they would make a comeback in June and spoiled parts of the new song. On June 21, TAN released the first part of their second extended play 2TAN with its lead single "Louder". On July 26, TAN released the second part of 2TAN with its lead single "Walking On The Moon". On August 4, the group's name was changed from TAN (Korean: 탄; pronounced tan) to TAN (Korean: 티에이엔; pronounced T.A.N.). They held their first ever showcase on Japan at Toyos PIT, Tokyo, and BIGCAT Live House, Osaka, on September 7 and 9, respectively.

On October 11, TAN released their first single album Dream & Deurim with the lead single "Beautiful Lie". On November 4, they had a fan meeting on Manila. They also had guest appearances on some television shows, such as ABS-CBN's It's Showtime. On November 26, they performed at the "1er Festival Coreano en República Dominicana (1st Korean Festival in the Dominican Republic)". A month later, on December 18 and 24, they held another fan meeting on Japan at Knowledge Theater, Osaka and TFT Hall 500, Tokyo.

=== 2023: Essege, Tan Made, and Proxima ===
On February 23, 2023, Think Entertainment released a promotional timetable revealing their next release, a special single album for their first anniversary titled Essege, which will be released on March 10. The single album's name came from the combining of the words "Essay" and "Message".n As per the planned date, the EP with the lead single "Fix You", which was a complete version of "Fix You Part.1" from their debut EP 1TAN, and its music video was released. On August 11, TAN released the EP Tan Made [I] with its lead single "Heartbeat".

On December 7, space burial company Celestis announced that one of TAN's songs, "Walking on the Moon", will be the first K-pop song to be sent physically into space as part of their 'Cosmic Archive'. The Enterprise flight, which the song will be a part of, will be launched from Florida's Cape Canaveral Space Force Station on December 24 aboard the United Launch Alliance Vulcan rocket. On December 26, TAN released their pre-debut Japanese EP Proxima. It managed to place first on the daily Oricon Albums Chart at the day.

=== 2024: "Seven Forever", 3TAN, and disbandment ===
On March 10, 2024, TAN released the digital single "Seven Forever" for their second anniversary. The single contained five tracks which were their reinterpretations of songs from Extreme Debut: Wild Idol. They also held a busking event for their anniversary at Sinchon Star Square. Two weeks later, on March 28, TAN released their first studio album 3TAN with the lead single "Hypertonic".

On June 29, Changsun announced on the group's official fan cafe that the group had disbanded.

== Members ==
- Changsun (창선)
- Jooan (주안)
- Jaejun (재준)
- Sunghyuk (성혁)
- Hyunyeop (현엽)
- Taehoon (태훈)
- Jiseong (지성)

== Discography ==
=== Studio albums ===
Title	Details	Peak chart positions	Sales
Title	Details	KOR	Sales
3TAN (Note: 3TAN is also referred to as TAN W Series '3TAN' (World ver).)	Released: March 28, 2024; Label: Think Entertainment; Formats: CD, digital download, streaming; Track listing: 1. "Adrenaline"; 2. "Hypertonic"; 3. "Love is An Open Door"; 4. "Dreamy Love"; 5. "Tmi"; 6. "Surfin'"; 7. "Lights"; 8. "5:45"; 9. "Area"	28	KOR: 19,906

=== Extended plays ===
Title	Album details	Peak chart positions		Sales
Title	Album details	KOR	JPN	Sales
1TAN (Note: 1TAN is also referred to as Limited Edition '1TAN'.)	Released: March 10, 2022; Label: Think Entertainment; Formats: CD, digital download, streaming; Track listing: 1. "Fix You Part1."; 2. "Du Du Du"; 3. "My Girl"; 4. "Du Du Du" (English version)	24	—	KOR: 15,460
2TAN (Note: 2TAN is also referred to as W Series '2TAN' (Wish ver) and W Series '2TAN' (We ver).)	Wish ver: Released: June 21, 2022; Label: Think Entertainment; Formats: CD, digital download, streaming; Track listing: 1. "Louder"; 2. "Adorable"; 3. "My Heart" (언제나); 4. "Louder" (English version)	16	—	KOR: 18,665
2TAN	We ver: Released: July 26, 2022; Label: Think Entertainment; Formats: CD, digital download, streaming; Track listing: 1. "Walking on the Moon"; 2. "Sing With You" (너란 별 (약속해요)); 3. "Midnight" (별 헤는 밤); 4. "Walking on the Moon" (English version)	27	—	KOR: 18,636
TAN Made [I]	Released: August 11, 2023; Label: Think Entertainment; Formats: CD, digital download, streaming; Track listing: 1. "Artificial Heart"; 2. "Heartbeat"; 3. "Violet"; 4. "Freeze (Changsun & Hyunyeop)"; 5. "Jekyll & Hyde (Jooan & Jaejung & Sunghyuk)"; 6. "Tarzan (Taehoon & Jiseong)"; 7. "New Days"	30	—	KOR: 16,542
Proxima	Released: December 26, 2023; Label: Nippon Columbia; Formats: CD, digital download, streaming; Track listing: 1. "Violet" (Japanese version); 2. "Adorable"; 3. "My Girl"; 4. "New Days"	—	12	JPN: 3,710
"—" denotes releases that did not chart or were not released in that region.

=== Single albums ===
Title	Album details	Peak chart positions	Sales
Title	Album details	KOR	Sales
Dream & Deurim	Released: October 11, 2022; Label: Think Entertainment; Formats: CD, digital download, streaming; Track listing: 1. "Beautiful Lie"; 2. "Our Youth"	42	KOR: 13,804
Essege	Released: March 10, 2023; Label: Think Entertainment; Formats: CD, digital download, streaming; Track listing: 1. "Fix You"; 2. "It's You" (바로 너); 3. "Would You?" (연주시차의 법칙); 4. "Dream of You" (CD Only)	16	KOR: 27,517

=== Singles ===
Title	Year	Peak chart positions		Album
Title	Year	KOR Down.	KOR BGM	Album
Korean
"Du Du Du"	2022	59	188	1TAN
"Louder"	2022	—	—	2TAN
"Walking On The Moon"	2022	—	193	2TAN
"Beautiful Lie"	2022	—	—	Dream & Deurim
"Fix You"	2023	—	—	Essege
"Heartbeat"	2023	—	—	TAN Made
"Hypertonic"	2024	—	155	3TAN
Japanese
"Violet" (pre-debut)	2023	—	—	Proxima
"—" denotes releases that did not chart or were not released in that region.

=== Other charted songs ===
Title	Year	Peak chart positions	Album
Title	Year	KOR BGM	Album
"Sing with You" (너란 별 (약속해요))	2022	189	2TAN
"Midnight" (별 헤는 밤)	2022	136	2TAN

== Videography ==
=== Music videos ===
Title	Year	Director(s)
"Du Du Du"	2022	Kwon Jin-mo
"Louder"	2022	Kwon Jin-mo
"Walking on the Moon"	2022	Kwon Jin-mo
"Beautiful Lie"	2022	Kwon Jin-mo
"Fix You"	2023	Kwon Jin-mo
"Heartbeat"	2023	
"Hypertonic"	2024	Grida

== Filmography ==
=== Television shows ===
Year	Title		Notes	Ref.
Year	English	Korean	Notes	Ref.
2021	The Wild Idol	극한데뷔 야생돌	Survival show to determine the members of TAN	
2022	We Are Family	우리는 식구당	Company wide variety show of Think Entertainment	
2022	Dancing Dol Stage	댄싱돌 스테이지 시즌1	Contestant, finished at first place	

=== Web shows ===
Year	Title	Notes	Ref.
2021-2022	TAN in Wonderland: 18-28	Pre-debut reality show	
2022	TAN-tents with PUBG: Battlegrounds	Game-themed survival variety show	

== Ambassadorship ==
- Ambassador for Untangodo 1330 (2022)

== Awards and nominations ==
Name of the award ceremony, year presented, category, nominee of the award, and the result of the nomination
Award ceremony	Year	Category	Nominee / Work	Result	Ref.
Hanteo Music Awards	2023	New Korean Wave Star	TAN	Won	
Hanteo Music Awards	2023	Rookie of the Year – Male	TAN	Nominated	
Seoul Music Awards	2023	Rookie Award	TAN	Nominated	
Seoul Music Awards	2023	Popularity Award	TAN	Nominated	
Seoul Music Awards	2023	Hallyu Special Award	TAN	Nominated	
Seoul Music Awards	2023	New Wave Star	TAN	Won	
