= Stamp on It =

- Digital cover

EP by Got the Beat
- Released: January 16, 2023
- Genre: Dance
- Length: 21:39
- Language: Korean
- Labels: SM; Dreamus

Singles from Stamp on It
- 1. "Stamp on It" Released: January 16, 2023

Professional ratings
Review scores
Source	Rating
NME	4/5 stars

Stamp on It is the first extended play by South Korean supergroup Got the Beat. It was released by SM Entertainment on January 16, 2023, and contains six tracks, including the lead single of the same name.

== Background and release ==
On December 23, 2022, SM Entertainment announced Got the Beat would be releasing a new song in January 2023. On December 29, it was announced they would be releasing their first extended play titled Stamp on It with lead single of the same name on January 16, 2023. On January 2, 2023, the promotional schedule was released. On January 15, the music video teaser for "Stamp on It" was released. The extended play was released alongside the music video for "Stamp on It" on January 16.

== Composition ==
Stamp on It consists of six tracks and incorporates various genres of dance. The lead single "Stamp on It" was described as a R&B and hip-hop-based dance song characterized by "piano and bass rhythm" with lyrics about "expressing the story of reaching the top spot in a fierce stage competition". The second track "Goddess Level" was described as a "powerful" dance song characterized by "heavy trap beat and rhythmic brass sound". The third track "Alter Ego" was described as a dance song featuring "various bass riffs in the chorus" with lyrics about "the seriousness of environmental problems". The fourth track "Rose" was described as a song R&B hip-hop song featuring "vocal chop and minimal beat" with lyrics about "comparing beauty that cannot be overlooked to the sharp thorns of a rose". The fifth track "Outlaw" was described as dance song featuring "dynamic bass rhythm layered with synthesizer rhythm". The sixth track "Mala" was described as a "hybrid" pop song featuring "the sound of a flute mixed with the sound of bass rhythm".

== Commercial performance ==
Stamp on It debuted at number three on South Korea's Circle Album Chart in the chart issue dated January 15–21, 2023; on its monthly chart, the EP debuted at number 16 in the chart issue dated January 2023. In Japan, the EP debuted at number 27 on the Oricon's Albums Chart in the chart issue dated January 30, 2023. It also debuted at number ten on the Oricon Digital Albums Chart, and number 35 on the Oricon Combined Albums chart in the chart issue dated January 30, 2023.

== Track listing ==
Stamp on It track listing
No.	Title	Lyrics	Music	Arrangement	Length
1.	"Stamp on It"	Yoo Young-jin	Dem Jointz; Yoo Young-jin; Tayla Parx	Dem Jointz; Yoo Young-jin	3:53
2.	"Goddess Level"	Hong Da-young (Lalala studio)	Anne Judith Wik; Ronny Svendsen; Nermin Harambašić; Adrian Thesen; Steve Diamond	Ronny Svendsen; Adrian Thesen	3:11
3.	"Alter Ego"	Danke (Lalala studio)	Josh Cumbee; Jordan Powers; Kella Armitage; Niiva; Jacob Attwooll; Elsa Curran	Josh Cumbee	4:07
4.	"Rose" (가시)	Song Jae-ri (153/Joombas)	Deez (Soultriii); Yunsu (Soultriii); Saay (Soultriii)	Deez; Yunsu	3:39
5.	"Outlaw"	Danke (lalala studio)	Anne Judith Wik; Ronny Svendsen; Nermin Harambašić; Adrian Thesen	Ronny Svendsen; Adrian Thesen	3:31
6.	"Mala"	Lee Hyung-seok	Kim Woong; Stereo14; Maria Marcus; Andreas Öberg	Kim Woong; Stereo14	3:18
Total length:					21:39

== Credits and personnel ==
Credits adapted from EP's liner notes.

Studio

- SM Booming System – recording, mixing, digital editing (track 1)
- SM Starlight Studio – recording (track 2–4, 6), digital editing (track 3, 4)
- Doobdoob Studio – recording (track 2–4), digital editing (track 3)
- SM Yellow Tail Studio – recording (track 3, 6), digital editing (track 3)
- SM Ssam Studio – recording (track 3–6), engineered for mix (track 4), digital editing (track 6)
- MonoTree Studio – recording (track 3)
- SM Big Shot Studio – recording (track 5), digital editing (track 5)
- Sound Pool Studio – recording (track 5, 6)
- SM Blue Cup Studio – recording (track 6), mixing (track 3, 5)
- SM Lvyin Studio – mixing (track 2), digital editing (track 2)
- SM Blue Ocean Studio – mixing (track 4)
- SM Concert Hall Studio – mixing (track 6)
- Sonic Korea – mastering (track 1)
- 821 Sound – mastering (track 2–6)

Personnel

- SM Entertainment – executive producer
- Lee Soo-man – producer
- Lee Sung-soo – production director, executive supervisor
- Tak Young-jun – executive supervisor
- Chae Jung-hee – A&R director
- Got the Beat – vocals, background vocals (all tracks)
- Yoo Young-jin – lyrics, composition, arrangement, vocal directing, background vocals, recording, mixing, digital editing (track 1), music and sound supervisor (all tracks)
- Kim Yeon-seo – background vocals (track 2–4), vocal directing (track 2, 4)
- Deez (Soultriii) – background vocals, composition, arrangement (track 4)
- Anne Judith Wik – background vocals (track 5), composition (track 2, 5)
- Kriz – background vocals, vocal directing (track 6)
- Hong Da-young (Lalala Studio) – lyrics (track 2)
- Danke (Lalala Studio) – lyrics (track 3, 5)
- Song Jae-ri (153/Joombas) – lyrics (track 4)
- Lee Hyung-seok – lyrics (track 6)
- Dem Jointz – composition, arrangement (track 1)
- Tayla Parx – composition (track 1)
- Ronny Svendsen – composition, arrangement (track 2, 5)
- Nermin Harambašić – composition (track 2, 5)
- Adrian Thesen – composition, arrangement (track 2, 5)
- Steve Diamond – composition (track 2)
- Josh Cumbee – composition, arrangement (track 3)
- Jordan Powers – composition (track 3)
- Kella Armitage – composition (track 3)
- Jacob Attwooll – composition (track 3)
- Elsa Curran – composition (track 3)
- Niiva – composition (track 3)
- Yunsu (Soultriii) – composition, arrangement (track 4)
- Saay (Soultriii) – composition, background vocals (track 4)
- Kim Woong – composition, arrangement (track 6)
- Stereo14 – composition, arrangement (track 6)
- Maria Marcus – composition (track 6)
- Andreas Öberg – composition (track 6)
- Eugene Kwon – recording (track 2–4)
- Jeong Yoo-ra – recording (track 2–4, 6), digital editing (track 3, 4)
- Lee Joo-hyung – recording, vocal directing, Pro Tools operating (track 3)
- Maxx Song – vocal directing, Pro Tools operating (track 5)
- Noh Min-ji – recording (track 3, 6), digital editing (track 3)
- Kang Eun-ji – recording (track 3–6), digital editing (track 6), engineered for mix (track 4)
- Lee Min-kyu – recording, digital editing (track 5)
- Jung Ho-jin – recording (track 5–6)
- Jung Eui-seok – recording (track 6), mixing (track 3, 5)
- Lee Ji-hong – mixing, digital editing (track 2)
- Ahn Chang-kyu – digital editing (track 3)
- Kim Cheol-sun – mixing (track 4)
- Nam Koong-jin – mixing (track 6)
- Jeon Hoon – mastering (track 1)
- Shin Soo-min – mastering assistant (track 1)
- Kwon Nam-woo – mastering (track 2–6)

== Charts ==
=== Weekly charts ===
Weekly chart performance for Stamp on It
Chart (2023)	Peak position
Japanese Albums (Oricon)	27
Japanese Combined Albums (Oricon)	35
South Korean Albums (Circle)	3

=== Monthly charts ===
Monthly chart performance for Stamp On It
Chart (2023)	Peak position
South Korean Albums (Circle)	16

== Sales ==
Sales for Stamp on It
Region	Sales
South Korea	164,433

== Release history ==
Release history for Stamp on It
Region	Date	Format	Label
South Korea	January 16, 2023	CD; SMC	SM; Dreamus
Various	January 16, 2023	Digital download; streaming	SM; Dreamus
