= Hyoyeon =

South Korean singer and dancer (born 1989)

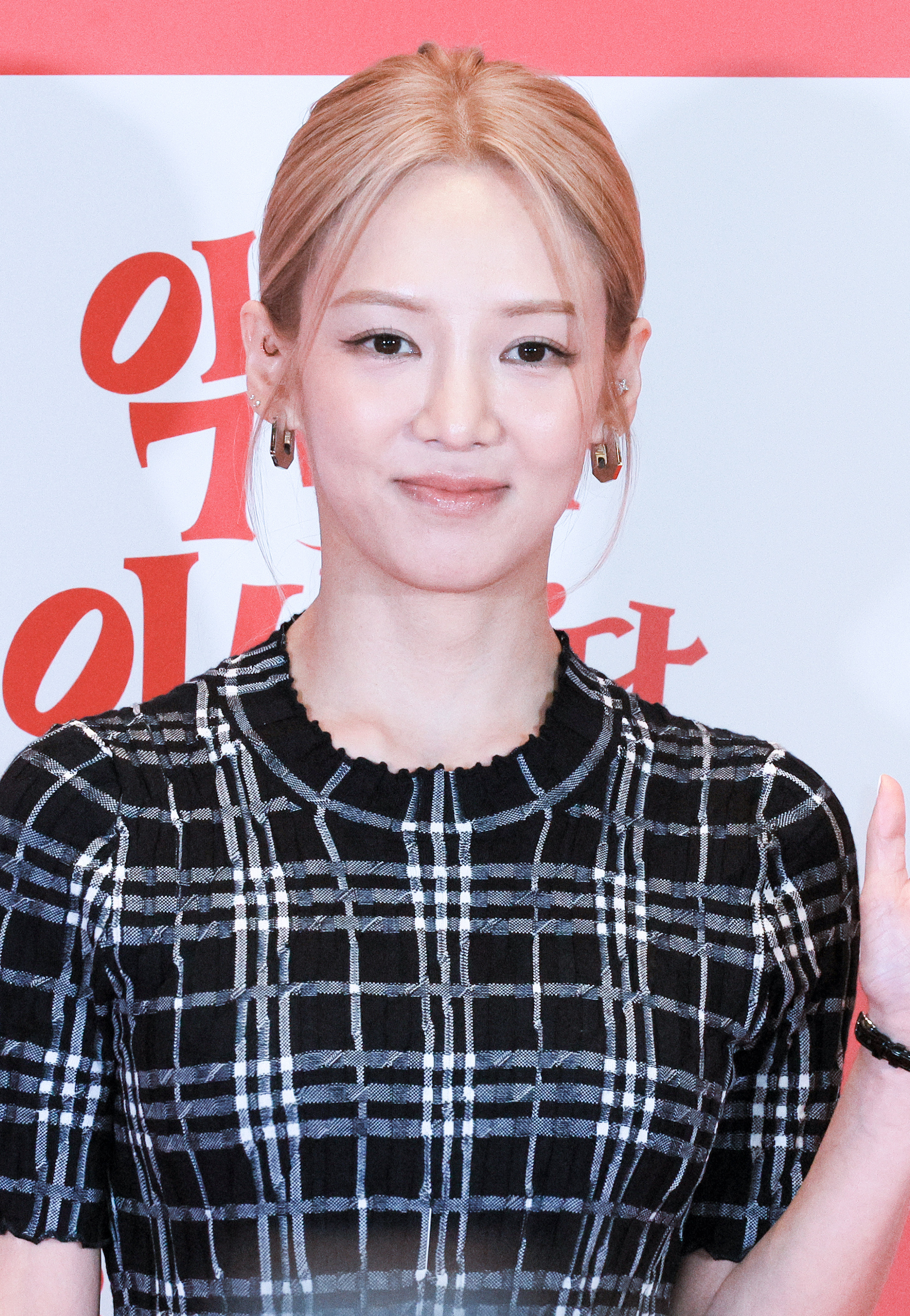
- Hyoyeon in August 2025
- Born: Kim Hyo-yeon; September 22, 1989 (age 37); Incheon, South Korea
- Other name: DJ Hyo
- Occupations: Singer; dancer; rapper; DJ
- Musical career
- Genres: K-pop; EDM
- Instrument: Vocals
- Years active: 2007–present
- Labels: SM; ScreaM Records
- Member of: Girls' Generation; Girls' Generation-Oh!GG; SM Town; Got the Beat; Girls' Generation-HRS
- Formerly of: Younique Unit; Triple T
- Website: Official website

Korean name
- Hangul: 김효연
- RR: Gim Hyoyeon
- MR: Kim Hyoyŏn

Signature
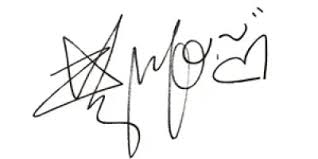

Kim Hyo-yeon (Korean: 김효연; born September 22, 1989), known professionally as Hyoyeon or DJ Hyo, is a South Korean singer, dancer, rapper, and DJ. She debuted as a member of the girl group Girls' Generation in August 2007, which went on to become one of the best-selling artists in South Korea and one of the most widely known K-pop groups worldwide. She has since participated in other SM Entertainment projects, including Girls' Generation-Oh!GG and Got the Beat. Hyoyeon also released the solo singles "Mystery" (2016) and "Wannabe" (2017) prior to making her solo debut as Hyo with the single "Sober" in 2018.

In South Korean television, Hyoyeon was a part of the main cast of the variety show Invincible Youth 2 (2011–2012), Attraction TV: Season 2 (2017), My English Puberty (2017–2018), Where Is Mr. Kim Season 2 (2018), Secret Unnie (2018), as the contestant of several competition show Dancing with the Stars: Season 2 (2012), Hit the Stage (2016), Good Girl (2020). Kim later had her own reality-show Hyoyeon's One Million Likes (2015) and Hyoyeon's 10 Million Likes (2016).

== Early life ==
Hyoyeon was born in Incheon, South Korea on September 22, 1989. She grew up with her parents and her younger brother, Kim Min-gu. Hyoyeon's formal dance training started in elementary school. At her neighborhood's small hip-hop school, she learned hip hop, jazz and Latin dance. In 1999, she enrolled in Winners Dance School, a famous dance school in South Korea specializing in popping, locking, animation and various other hip-hop styles. At the school she met Miss A's Min, with whom she formed the dance team Little Winners (리틀위너스). The duo performed at various showcases and was spotlighted by HipHoper.com in 2004.

Hyoyeon auditioned for SM Entertainment at the age of 11 through the SM 2000 Casting System. Hyoyeon said she auditioned because her mother brought her to the offices of S.M. Entertainment in the hopes of meeting H.O.T. Hyoyeon then danced in an audition show. In 2004, along with Super Junior's Siwon, she was sent to study Chinese in Beijing. She received dance instruction from the Electric Boogaloos and top choreographers such as Kim Hye-rang, Poppin Seen, Kwang Hoo (aka Crazy Monkey), Poppin DS, Kwon Seok-jin (aka Locking Khan) and Black Beat's Shim Jae-won. She also worked with one of Justin Timberlake's choreographers and a few foreign teachers.

Before debuting with Girls' Generation, she worked with a choreographer for Janet Jackson and was BoA's silhouette dancer during a performance at M.net KM Music Festival 2005. In 2007, she teamed up with Jae Won for a dance collaboration to "Anonymous". Hyoyeon was also picked as Korea's No. 1 idol dancer on Star News.

== Career ==
=== 2007–2017: Girls' Generation, television shows and solo career ===
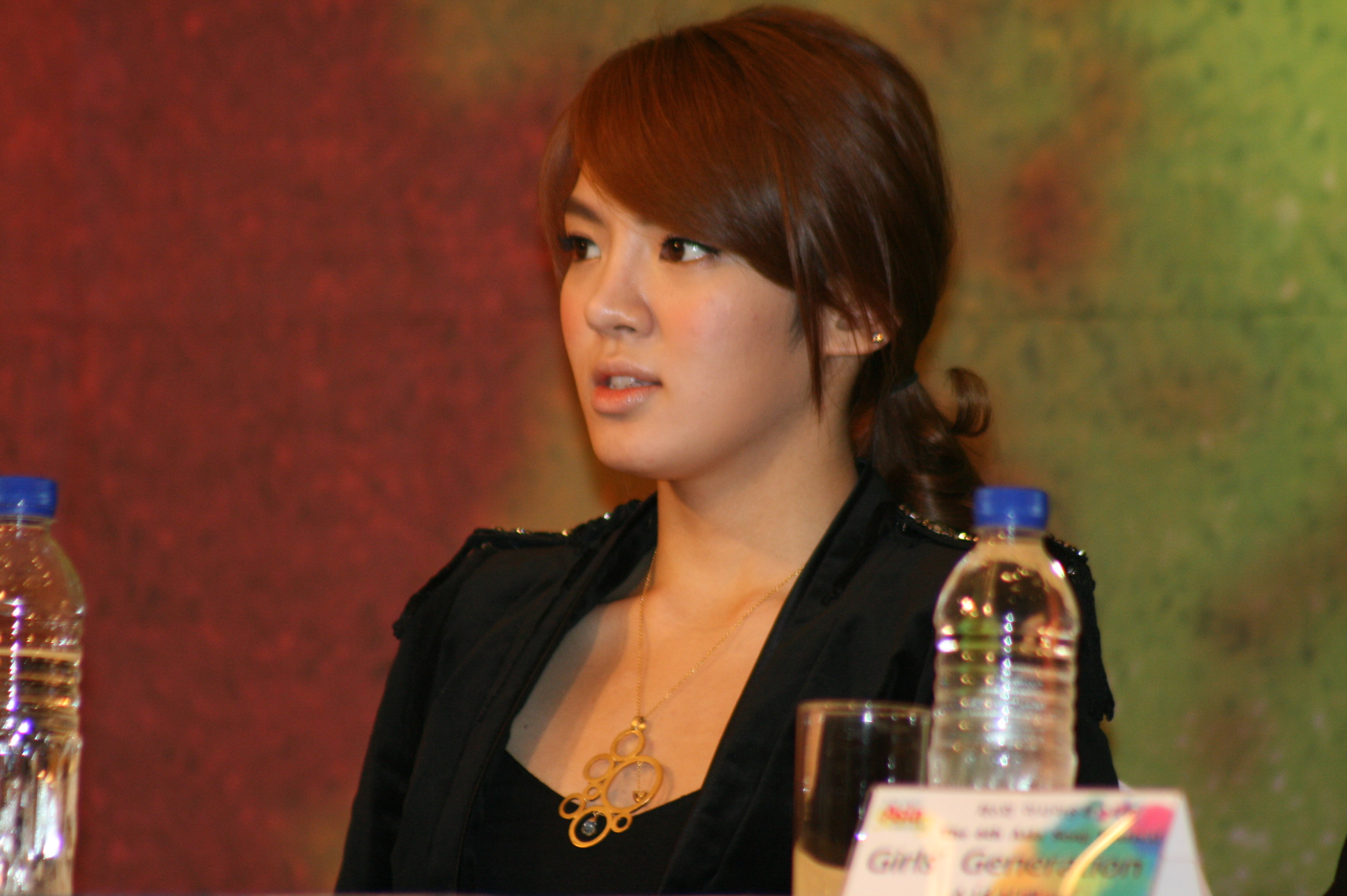
Hyoyeon in 2009

Hyoyeon officially debuted as a member of Girls' Generation, a South Korean girl group formed by SM Entertainment, in August 2007. In July 2007, before the official debut Girls' Generation had their first stage performance on Mnet's School of Rock, where the group performed their first single, "Into the New World" (다시 만난 세계; Dasi mannan segye). On August 5, 2007, the group officially made their debut on SBS's Inkigayo, where they performed the same song. Girls' Generation subsequently released their self-titled debut studio album in November 2007, which was preceded by the singles "Girls' Generation" (소녀시대; Sonyeo sidae).

On January 7, 2009, the group released their extended play (EP) Gee, its title track claimed the number-one position on KBS's Music Bank for a record-breaking nine consecutive weeks, becoming the longest-running number-one song on Music Bank until 2012, when Psy's "Gangnam Style" claimed the top spot for ten consecutive weeks.

Girls' Generation's second studio album, Oh!, was released in January 2010. On March 7, Hyoyeon and fellow Girls' Generation members Jessica and Sooyoung played cameo roles in episode 7 of the SBS television mini-series Oh! My Lady, starring Chae Rim and labelmate Choi Siwon. In September 2010, Girls' Generation released the Japanese version of "Genie" as their debut single in Japan.

After releasing three singles in Japan, their debut eponymous Japanese studio album was released in June 2011. The album was met with tremendous success in Japan, peaking atop the Japanese Oricon Albums Chart and becoming the first album by a foreign girl group to top the Oricon chart. Girls' Generation's third Korean studio album, The Boys, was released in October 2011. The album was released in the United States by Interscope Records, marking Girls' Generation's debut album in the country. In November 2011, Hyoyeon and fellow Girls' Generation member Sunny became cast members for the second season of Invincible Youth, a South Korean reality television show.

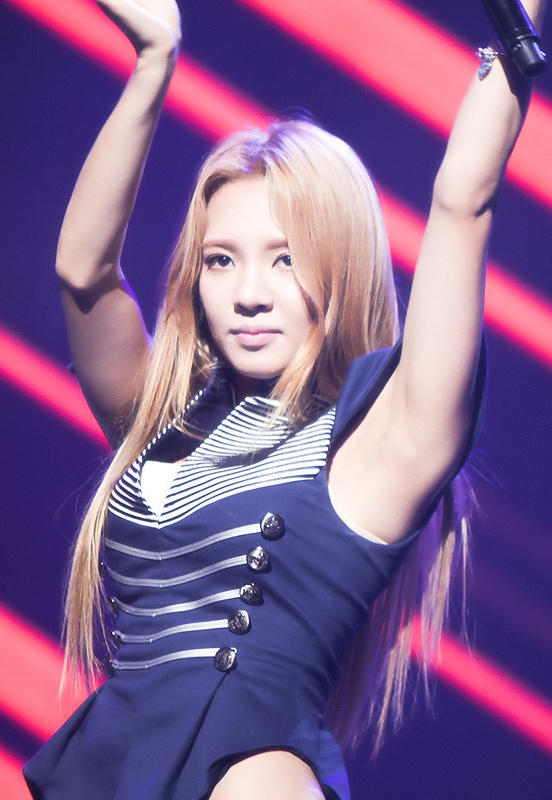
Hyoyeon performing at the Diet Look Concert in 2012

In April 2012, Hyoyeon became a contestant in the second season of Dancing with the Stars, a competitive ballroom dancing television show. Hyoyeon and her partner, Kim Hyung-seok, ended up winning second place. In October 2012, Hyoyeon participated in S.M. Entertainment's special dance group Younique. The group released a single titled "Maxstep" as part of the collaboration between S.M. and Hyundai.

In January 2013, Hyoyeon made a guest appearance on the television show Blind Test Show 180 Degrees, where she took on the challenge of dancing to various types of club music. In May 2013, Hyoyeon was chosen as an Asian ambassador for the Hong Kong branch of Topshop. In June 2013, Hyoyeon and fellow Girls' Generation member Yuri became coaches for the contestants on Dancing 9, a competitive dancing television show.

On February 12, 2015, Hyoyeon was featured in labelmate Amber's "Shake That Brass" music video, in which she plays a trumpet. On July 1, Hyoyeon became the first Girls' Generation member to publish a book with Hyo Style, in which she shares tips on beauty, fashion and lifestyle. The book contains 142 pages and comes with a DVD. On March 14, Hyoyeon was featured as the rapper in a performance by boyband S on Immortal Songs 2, with which they won with 423 points. In May 2015, she became a cast member of the Korean-Chinese reality television show Star Advent. The show followed 12 Korean and Chinese celebrities tasked with working as office workers in foreign countries and premiered on July 9. In June 2015, Hyoyeon began hosting her own reality television show, Hyoyeon's One Million Likes, broadcast on OnStyle. Before the show was officially announced, an Instagram account was created where Hyoyeon posted pictures and videos with the goal of receiving one million likes from fans. On August 19, Girls' Generation released their fifth Korean studio album, Lion Heart. The album reached number one in South Korea, and at number 11 in Japan. In September 2015, Hyoyeon became a contestant alongside Seo In Young, Mir and Hyejeong, among others, in a television show titled Mash Up, where they competed in DJing. In the same month, Hyoyeon was featured in rapper Vasco's "Whoa Ha!" music video, where guest stars lip-sync along to the song.

On February 3, 2016, Hyoyeon was a special MC on the OnStyle television show Get It Beauty. In June 2016, she became a contestant alongside Taemin, Bora and Hoya, among others, in the Mnet television show Hit The Stage, where they collaborate with professional dancers to compete in different genres of dancing under a given theme. In the same month, Hyoyeon was featured in the song "Up & Down" from fellow Girls' Generation member Taeyeon's second extended play Why. In August 2016, she collaborated with Min and Jo Kwon to form a special group named Triple T and release a single titled "Born to Be Wild", featuring Park Jin-young, as part of S.M. Entertainment's Station music project. In December 2016, Hyoyeon released her first solo song since debut titled "Mystery" as another single for SM Station. To accompany her solo release, she performed the song on various Korean music shows.

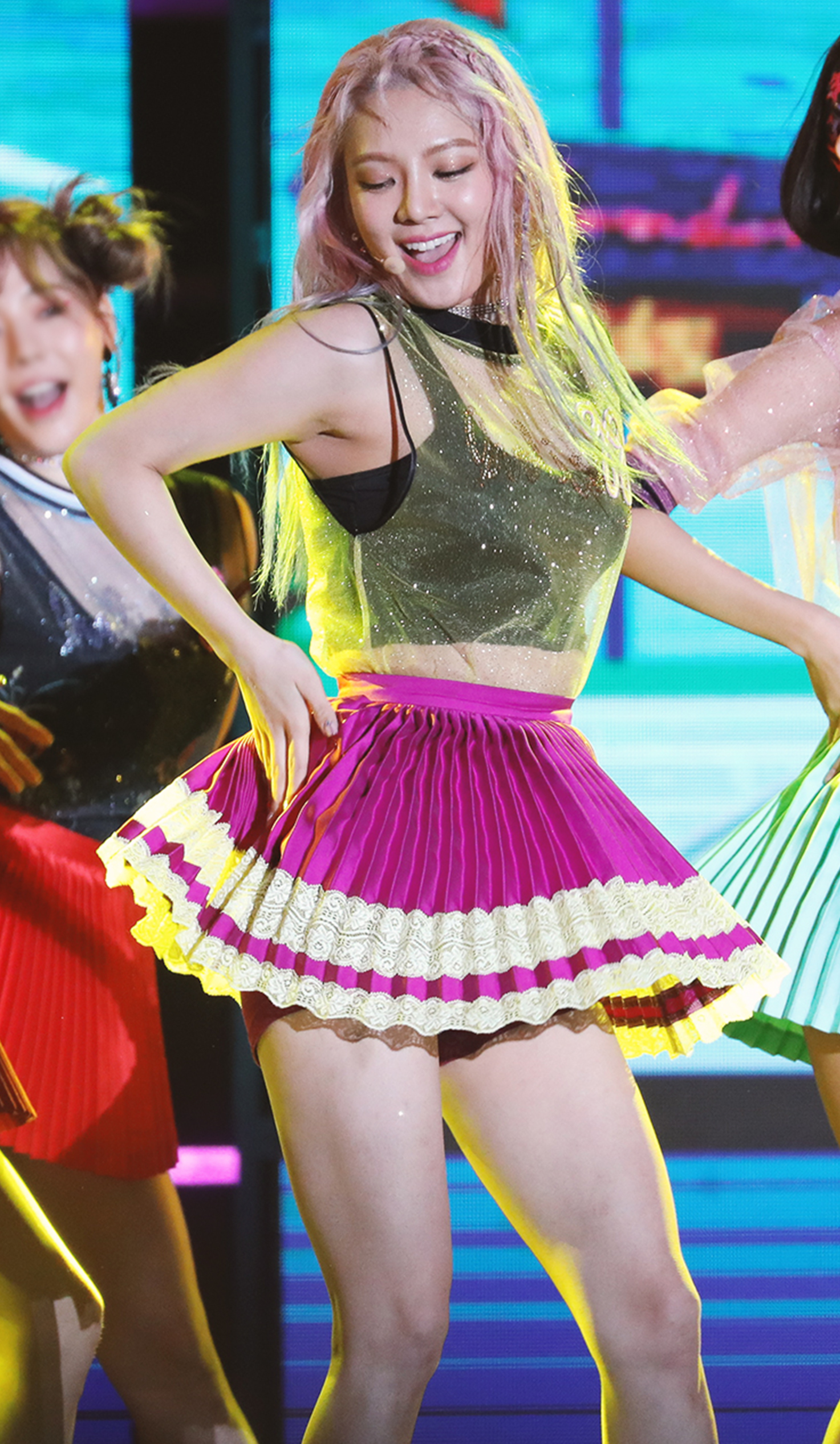
Hyoyeon performing at MBC 2017 DMZ Peace Concert

In June 2017, Hyoyeon released her second single "Wannabe", a pop dance song featuring rapper San E. A month later, Girls' Generation announced the release of their sixth Korean-language studio album to commemorate the group's tenth anniversary. The album, titled Holiday Night, was released on August 7.

=== 2018–present: DJ career, Oh!GG and Got the Beat ===
On April 12, 2018, SM Entertainment announced that Hyoyeon would return with a new single titled "Sober" on April 18, with new stage name Hyo (stylized in all uppercase), under SM's electronic dance music label Scream Records. The new single is a tropical-future house song characterized by electric guitar riffs and hook. It was also revealed that she would also be promoting actively as a DJ in domestic club tours and EDM festivals under her new stage name. In August 2018, Hyoyeon was announced to be part of Girls' Generation's second sub-unit, Oh!GG, which consists of the five members of the group who remained under SM Entertainment. The group released their debut single, "Lil' Touch", in September. On November 7, SM Entertainment revealed teaser images with the announcement that Hyoyeon would be releasing her second official track as DJ Hyo with a new single titled "Punk Right Now", which features American DJ 3lau, on November 13.

On July 20, 2019, Hyoyeon released a new single, "Badster", which is a psychedelic trance song she co-produced and co-wrote; an animated music video was released on the same day. It has Korean and English versions. On July 22, 2020, Hyoyeon released a new single, "Dessert", alongside rappers Loopy and Soyeon. It marked her return to music shows after debuting as a DJ.

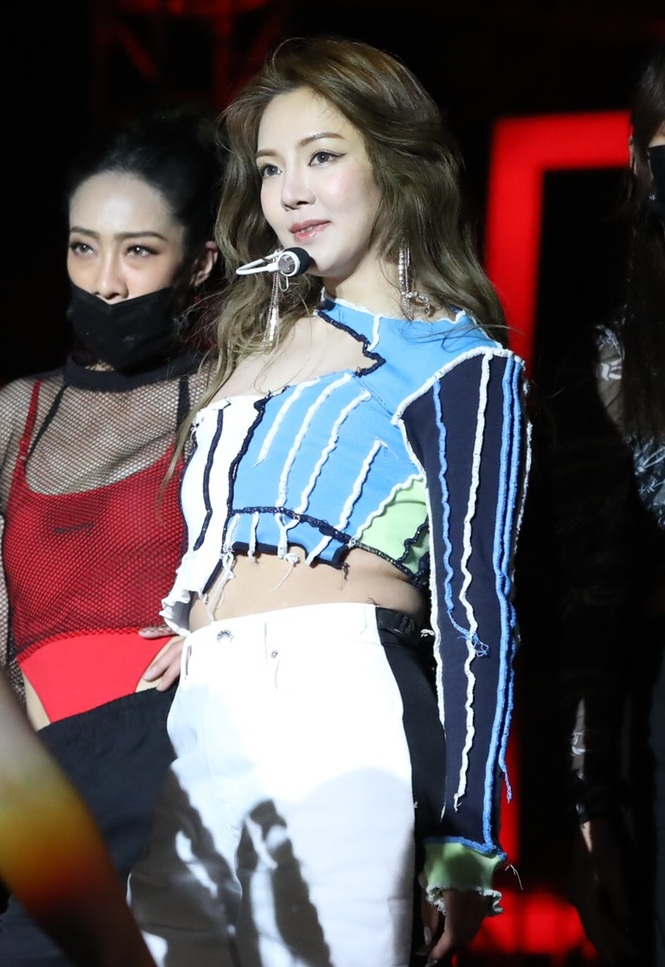
Hyoyeon performing in 2020

In May 2020, Hyoyeon joined the competitive reality show Good Girl.

On August 9, 2021, Hyoyeon released the single "Second", featuring BIBI. The song debuted at position 17 on Billboard World Digital Songs in the chart issue dated August 21, 2021. On December 27, Hyoyeon was revealed as a member of supergroup Got the Beat, alongside Girls' Generation groupmate Taeyeon and other labelmates. The group debuted on January 3, 2022, with single "Step Back".

On May 2, 2022, SM Entertainment announced that Hyoyeon would be releasing her first extended play titled Deep on May 16. It includes the lead single of the same name, an original B-side, and several previous singles, in a total of seven tracks. On May 17, it was announced that Girls' Generation will have a full-group comeback for their fifteenth anniversary in August, ending their five-year hiatus, which will include Hyoyeon. Their seventh Korean-language studio album, Forever 1, was released in August 2022, peaking at number two on the Circle Chart.

On September 26, 2024, Hyoyeon released the single "Retro Romance".

== Discography ==
=== Extended plays ===
List of extended plays, showing selected details, and selected chart positions
Title	Details	Peak chart positions	Sales
Title	Details	KOR	Sales
Deep	Released: May 16, 2022; Label: SM Entertainment; Formats: CD, digital download, streaming	13	KOR: 13,064

=== Singles ===
List of singles, showing year released, selected chart positions, sales figures, and name of the album
Title	Year	Peak chart positions			Sales	Album
Title	Year	KOR		US World	Sales	Album
Title	Year	Circle	Hot	US World	Sales	Album
As lead artist
"Mystery"	2016	—	—N/a	12	—N/a	SM Station Season 1
"Wannabe" (featuring San E)	2017	—	—N/a	8	—N/a	Non-album single
"Sober" (featuring Ummet Ozcan)	2018	—	—	15	—N/a	Deep
"Punk Right Now" (featuring 3lau)	2018	—	—	16	—N/a	Deep
"Badster"	2019	—	—	—	—N/a	Deep
"Dessert" (featuring Loopy and Soyeon)	2020	— (Note: "Dessert" did not enter Gaon Digital Chart, but peaked at position 166 on the component Download Chart.)	96	16	—N/a	Deep
"Think About Me" (with Raiden featuring Coogie)	2020	—	—	—	—N/a	SM Station Season 4
"Second" (featuring Bibi)	2021	176	89	17	—N/a	Deep
"Deep"	2022	— (Note: "Deep" did not enter Gaon Digital Chart, but peaked at position 87 on the component Download Chart.)	—	—	—N/a	Deep
"Picture"	2023	— (Note: "Picture" did not enter the Circle Digital Chart, but peaked at number 60 on the Download Chart.)	—	—	—N/a	Non-album single
"Retro Romance"	2024	— (Note: "Retro Romance" did not enter the Circle Digital Chart, but peaked at number 99 on the Download Chart.)	—	—	—N/a	Non-album single
"Money" (with Slushii)	2025	—	—	—	—N/a	Non-album single
"Yes"	2025	—	—	—	—N/a	Non-album single
"Moveurbody"	2026	—	—	—	—N/a	Non-album single
As featured artist
"Up & Down" (Taeyeon featuring Hyoyeon)	2016	84	—N/a	—	KOR: 34,300	Why
"G! (Remix)" (Lil Cherry featuring Hyo)	2021	—	—	—	—N/a	Non-album single
"Party" (Pimrypie featuring Hyo)	2023	—	—	—	—N/a	Non-album single
"—" denotes releases that did not chart or were not released in that region.

=== Other appearances ===
List of other appearances songs, showing year released, selected chart positions, sales figures, and name of the album
Title	Year	Peak chart positions		Sales	Album
Title	Year	KOR Gaon	US World	Sales	Album
"Maxstep" (as part of Younique Unit)	2012	228	—	KOR: 15,420	PYL Younique Volume 1
"Born to be Wild" (as part of Triple T featuring J. Y. Park)	2016	164	11	—N/a	SM Station Season 1
"Turl" (털어) (with Cheetah)	2020	—	—	—N/a	Good Girl Episode 1
"Witch" (마녀사냥) (with Yeeun, Jeon Ji-woo, Jamie and Cheetah)	2020	—	—	—N/a	Good Girl Episode 3
"GG" (with Ailee, Jeon Ji-woo)	2020	—	—	—N/a	Good Girl Episode 4
"I Do What I Want" (with Lee Young-ji)	2020	—	—	—N/a	Good Girl Final
"Jet" (with Eunhyuk, Taeyong, Jaemin, Sungchan, Giselle and Winter)	2022	— (Note: "Jet" did not enter the Circle Digital Chart, but debuted and peaked at number 108 on the component Download Chart.)	—	—N/a	2022 Winter SM Town: SMCU Palace
"Good to Be Alive" (with Key, Chen, Johnny, Ningning, Ginjo, Raiden, IMLAY, and Mar Vista)	2022	— (Note: "Good to Be Alive" did not enter the Circle Digital Chart, but debuted and peaked at number 113 on the component Download Chart.)	—	—N/a	2022 Winter SM Town: SMCU Palace
"—" denotes releases that did not chart or were not released in that region.

== Filmography ==
=== Film ===
Year	Title	Role	Notes	Ref.
2012	I AM.	Herself	Biographical film of SM Town	
2015	SMTown The Stage	Herself	Documentary film of SM Town	

=== Television drama ===
Year	Title	Role	Notes	Ref.
2008	Unstoppable Marriage	Bulgwang-dong's Seven Princesses Gang	Cameo (Ep.64)	
2010	Oh! My Lady	Herself	Cameo (Ep.7)	

=== Television shows ===
Year	Title	Role	Notes	Ref.
2007	Cutie Honey, Mini Musical	A bully	with Yuri & Jessica	
2011–2012	Invincible Youth 2	Main cast	with Sunny	
2012	Dancing with the Stars: Season 2	Main cast	Hyoyeon & Kim Hyung-suk won 2nd place	
2013	Blind Test Show 180 Degrees	Herself		
2013	Dancing 9: Season 1	Coach	with Yuri	
2015	Hyoyeon's One Million Likes	Herself		
2015	Mash Up	Contestant		
2016	Star Advent	Main cast		
2016	Hyoyeon's 10 Million Likes	Herself	China-Korea variety show	
2016	Hit the Stage	Contestant		
2017	Attraction TV: Season 2	Regular member		
2017–2018	My English Puberty	Main cast		
2018	Where is Mr.Kim: Season 2	Main cast		
2018	Secret Unnie	Regular member	Ep. 2–6, 8–9, 13–19	
2018	Human Intelligence – The Most Perfect A.I.	Regular member		
2020	Good Girl	Contestant		
2023	Universe Ticket	Mentor		
2024	No Way Home	Main host	with Sunny	

=== Web shows ===
Year	Title	Role	Notes	Ref.
2021	Unnie's Beauty Carpool	Main cast	with Bora	
2021	Today's Celebrity - Filial Master	Host		
2024–present	Hyo's Level Up	Host	YouTube talk show	

=== Music videos ===
Title	Year
As lead artist
"Mystery"	2016
"Wannabe" (featuring San E)	2017
"Sober" (featuring Ummet Ozcan)	2018
"Punk Right Now" (featuring 3lau)	2018
"Badster"	2019
"Dessert" (featuring Loopy and Soyeon)	2020
"Think About Me" (with Raiden featuring Coogie)	2020
"Second" (featuring Bibi)	2021
"Deep"	2022
"Picture"	2023
"Retro Romance"	2024
As featured artist
"G! (Remix)" (Lil Cherry featuring Hyo)	2021
"Party" (Pimrypie featuring Hyo)	2023

== Concerts ==
=== Tours ===
- DJ HYO Tour 2023 in North America (2023)
- DJ HYO 2024 Spring USA Tour "CHERRY BLOSSOM" (2024)
- DJ HYO 2024 USA Summer Tour (2024)
- DJ HYO 2025 USA Summer Tour (2025)
- DJ HYO 2026 USA Summer Tour (2026)

=== Concert participation ===
- SM Town Live 2022: SMCU Express at Kwangya (2022)
- SM Town Live 2022: SMCU Express (2022)
- SM Town Live 2023: SMCU Palace at Kwangya (2023)
- SM Town Live 2025: The Culture, the Future (2025)

== Awards and nominations ==
Name of the award ceremony, year presented, category, nominee of the award, and the result of the nomination
Award ceremony	Year	Category	Nominee / Work	Result	Ref.
MBC Entertainment Awards	2012	Female Newcomer Show Variety	Dancing with the Stars: Season 2	Nominated	
