= Royal.io =

American music rights online marketplace

Royal
- Industry: Music
- Founder: 3lau (Justin Blau)
- Headquarters: Austin, Texas, U.S.
- Key people: 3lau (Justin Blau)
- Website: www.royal.io

Royal (Royal.io) is a US-based platform that sells music rights as limited digital assets. It was founded by Opendoor co-founder JD Ross and DJ and electronic music producer Justin "3lau" Blau It is headquartered in Austin, Texas.

== History ==
Royal was founded in May 2021 by Justin Blau, who is popularly known as 3lau. The company is backed by musicians such as The Chainsmokers, Logic, and Kygo.

Royal founder 3lau gave away the first tokenized music offering in a contest for 50% of royalties for his song "Worst Case" in 2021. After the giveaway, the song was noted as the world's first fan-owned song.

Royal partnered with rapper Nas to sell streaming royalty rights for the songs "Ultra Black" and "Rare" through its platform in January 2022. Through this initial sale, Nas became the first artist to sell song rights through Royal.

Diplo became the next major artist to sell streaming royalty rights through Royal in March 2022, selling royalty rights to the song "Don't Forget My Love." Duo Tritonal followed shortly after, selling ownership of their single "Getaway" in April 2022.

On 17 May 2022, The Chainsmokers dropped via Royal 4000 NFTs to fans, granting them the license to receive a share of streaming royalties of the album "So Far So Good".

In July 2022, Royal started the first round of royalty payout to the fans.

Other artists who have sold song rights through Royal include Vérité and Ollie.

== Services ==
Royal sells Limited Digital Assets (LDAs), which grant buyers a package of music rights and benefits. Buyers own a portion of a song's streaming royalty rights and earn royalties alongside the music artist. Royal also allows buyers to redeem benefits and rewards chosen by the music artist who created the song they own.

Song rights are divided into three different tiers with separate rewards and ownership percentages.
