= Meighan Stone =

- Education: Columbia University
- Spouse: Seth Amgott (2008-)

Meighan Stone is an academic and political activist. She is currently serving as a senior fellow at the Council on Foreign Relations in the Women and Foreign Policy Program. Prior to this, she was the president of the Malala Fund, and a fellow at the Harvard Kennedy School's Shorenstein Center.
