= 3lau =

American DJ and music producer

- 3LAU performing at Spring Awakening Festival in 2012

Background information
- Born: Justin David Blau; January 9, 1991 (age 35); Syosset, New York, U.S.
- Origin: Las Vegas, Nevada
- Genres: Progressive house; electro house; deep house; synthwave; future bass
- Occupations: DJ; producer
- Instruments: Synthesizer; mixer; piano; guitar; vocals
- Years active: 2011–2025 (as 3lau) 2025 – present (as Justin Blau)
- Labels: Revealed Recordings; Strictly Rhythm; Island Records; Musical Freedom; Dim Mak Records; Blume
- Website: justinblau.art

Justin David Blau (born January 9, 1991), better known by his former stage name 3lau (stylized in all caps, pronounced "Blau"), is an American DJ and electronic dance music producer.

== Early life ==
Justin David Blau was born in Syosset, New York, on January 9, 1991. Blau grew up in an artistic family and was soon playing piano and guitar and singing. At 13, he moved with his family to Las Vegas. He attended The Meadows School in Las Vegas for high school and Washington University in St. Louis.

== Music career ==
Much of 3lau's music incorporates electro house, dubstep, deep house, and progressive house. He is known for his melodic take on dance music and live sets that incorporate sampling. The emotional purpose of his style of songwriting, Blau says, is to inspire others to overcome their sense of feeling lost.

=== 2011–12: First releases ===
In 2011, at the age of 20, he vacationed in Sweden, where he discovered electronic dance music. After returning to college he started producing mashups, "mainly because [he] didn't think anyone was doing a good job." He soon began mixing under the professional name 3lau, and by June of that year, was uploading mashups to YouTube.

3lau gained recognition in the electronic music world in 2011 with his two bootlegs, "Girls Who Save the World" and "All Night Long". He also won a remix competition for his remix of Tiesto's "Work Hard, Play Hard". Before 2012 while a student at Washington University in St. Louis, 3lau DJed at night. His remixes charted in the top 10 on both Beatport and Hype Machine.

=== 2012–15: Singles, touring ===
In 2012, he focused on DJing and launched his 3lau Your Mind tour. That same year, he released his second bootleg album, Dance Floor Filth. In 2012, the Las Vegas Review-Journal described him as "one of America's fastest-rising DJ-producers." In 2012 he released Dance Floor Filth 2, an album featuring his production.

In late 2013, he went on a short tour with Carnage called the Night Riot tour. Jonah Ollman of Sound of Boston said 3lau's live performances in late 2013 are "A nice balance of mashups, electro-house, poppy vocal samples, and a 90's throwback here and there keep the young 20-something crowd going and constantly entertained." In the summer of 2015, he visited Barcelona, Germany, and Ibiza on his first European tour. Later in the fall, he went on his first Asian tour, stops included Bangkok, Jakarta, and Tokyo.

=== 2016–17: Blume Records ===
In 2016 3lau launched Blume Records, an independent label with a ground-breaking model that harnesses the power of streaming to raise money for charitable causes. 3lau said, "Hopefully we can inspire other people to act and there will be this domino effect."

=== 2018–19: Ultraviolet, OMF ===
On February 16, 2018, 3lau released his debut album Ultraviolet on label "BLUME" featuring singles "Touch," "On My Own", "Walk Away" and "Star Crossed". The album features collaborations with Carly Paige, Nevve, Emma Hewitt, Max Schneider, Said the Sky, and Neonheart. The album hit No. 1 on iTunes' Electronic Chart, as did lead single "Touch." On June 21, 2018, 3lau announced the launch of OMF (Our Music Festival), the first blockchain-powered music festival. The festival was held on October 20, 2018, in San Francisco and was headlined by Zedd.

In March 2021, 3lau marked the three-year anniversary of his Ultraviolet album through an unusual internet auction with "NFTs" (non-fungible tokens) certifying certain digital rights and the one-of-a-kind ownership, for a total of approximately US$11 million in the three-day sale.

=== 2025: Touring ===
In January 2025, 3lau performed at Donald Trump's second Inaugural Ball and was strongly criticized by the media and multiple artists, including known artists Deadmau5 and Jai Wolf, for his attendance and possible indirect support for Donald Trump.

A couple months after the backlash, 3lau deleted his social media pages and teased that he was rebranding and changing his stage name. On March 13, a social media post was made on a new account announcing that he was returning to using his real name, Justin Blau, and that the 3lau chapter had ended.

== Charity work ==
In 2016, 3lau launched the record label Blume, the first not-for-profit dance music label. Profits from all songs released on Blume are dedicated to charity. 3lau raised over $200,000 for Pencils of Promise, a nonprofit using the funds donated to build a seven-classroom school in Quetzaltenango, Guatemala as well as to fund clean water, education, and teacher development programs. In 2013, 3LAU announced that he had built his first school with the non-profit and in 2018 another school was built in Guatemala.

== Discography ==
=== Albums ===
Title	Details	Peak chart positions
Title	Details	US Dance
Ultraviolet	Released: February 16, 2018; Label: Blume Music; Format: Streaming	7

=== Singles ===
Table shows list of single titles, release dates and record labels
Title	Artist	Release date	Release label
"Escape"	3lau and Paris and Simo featuring Bright Lights	June 24, 2013	Revealed Recordings
"How You Love Me"	3lau featuring Bright Lights	March 18, 2014	Island Records
"Vikings"	Botnek and 3lau	April 8, 2014	Dim Mak Records
"Somehow"	Dash Berlin and 3lau featuring Bright Lights	August 29, 2014	Mainstage Music
"We Came to Bang"	3lau featuring Luciana	November 28, 2014	Musical Freedom
"The Night"	3lau and Nom De Strip featuring Estelle	January 12, 2015	Revealed Recordings
"Alive Again"	3lau featuring Emma Hewitt	July 6, 2015	Armada Music
"Runaway"	Bright Lights featuring 3lau	October 16, 2015	Dim Mak Records
"Is It Love"	3lau featuring Yeah Boy	March 29, 2016	Blume Music
"Fire"	3lau and Said The Sky featuring Neonheart	October 25, 2016	Blume Music
"You Want More"	3lau featuring MAX	November 25, 2016	Blume Music
"On My Mind"	3lau featuring Yeah Boy	March 31, 2017	Blume Music
"Hot Water"	Audien and 3lau featuring Victoria Zaro	June 16, 2017	Astralwerks
"Star Crossed"	3lau	September 8, 2017	Blume Music
"Walk Away"	3lau featuring Luna Aura	December 1, 2017	Blume Music
"On My Own"	3lau featuring Nevve	February 1, 2018	Blume Music
"Touch"	3lau featuring Carly Paige	February 16, 2018	Blume Music
"Dirty Neon"	3lau and Zaxx featuring Olivera	May 25, 2018	Blume Music
"Punk Right Now"	Hyo and 3lau	November 13, 2018	SM Entertainment
"Game Time"	3lau featuring Ninja	November 30, 2018	Astralwerks
"Would You Understand"	3lau featuring Carly Paige	January 4, 2019	Blume Music
"Better with You"	3lau and Justin Caruso featuring Iselin	March 1, 2019	Armada Music
"Down for Life"	3lau and Bright Lights	June 21, 2019	Blume Music
"Falling"	3lau and Dmno	August 23, 2019	Blume Music
"Miss Me More"	3lau	September 12, 2019	Blume Music
"Tokyo"	3lau featuring Xira	December 6, 2019	Anjunabeats
"At Night"	3lau and Shaun Frank featuring Grabbitz	January 14, 2020	Blume Music
"Apocalyptic"	3lau	August 28, 2020	Stmpd Rcrds
"Everything"	3lau and Funkin Matt featuring Frawley	January 22, 2021	Blume Music
"Worst Case"	3lau featuring Cxloe	October 8, 2021	Blume Music
"Too Late for Love"	3lau	November 25, 2022	Blume Music
"Easy"	3lau featuring Xira	October 20, 2023	Anjunabeats

=== Remixes ===
- Zedd – "Spectrum" (3lau Remix)
- James Egbert – "Back to New" (3lau Remix)
- Kap Slap – "E.T. Feels Starry Eyed" (3lau Remix)
- Adele – "Set Fire to the Rain" (3lau Bootleg)
- Tiësto – "Red Lights" (3lau's Acoustic Version)
- Blinders featuring Charles – "Always" (3lau Mix)
- Jessie J, Ariana Grande, Nicki Minaj – "Bang Bang" (3lau Remix)
- Shawn Mendes – "Stitches" (3lau Remix)
- Anitta and Alesso – Is That for Me (3lau Remix)
- Justin Bieber – "Sorry" (3lau Remix)
- The Chainsmokers – "Don't Let Me Down" (3lau Remix)
- Ariana Grande – "Into You" (3lau Remix)
- Katy Perry – "Bon Appétit" (3lau Remix)
- 3lau and Audien – "Hot Water" (3lau DNB Remix)
- Rihanna – Desperado (3lau Remix)
- Alesso – Is That for Me (3lau Remix)
- 3lau – "Star Crossed" (3lau DnB Remix)
- 3lau – "On My Own" (3lau Electro Remix)
- San Holo — "Lost Lately" (3lau Remix)

== See also ==
- Royal.io
