= Red Velvet – Irene & Seulgi =

South Korean girl group

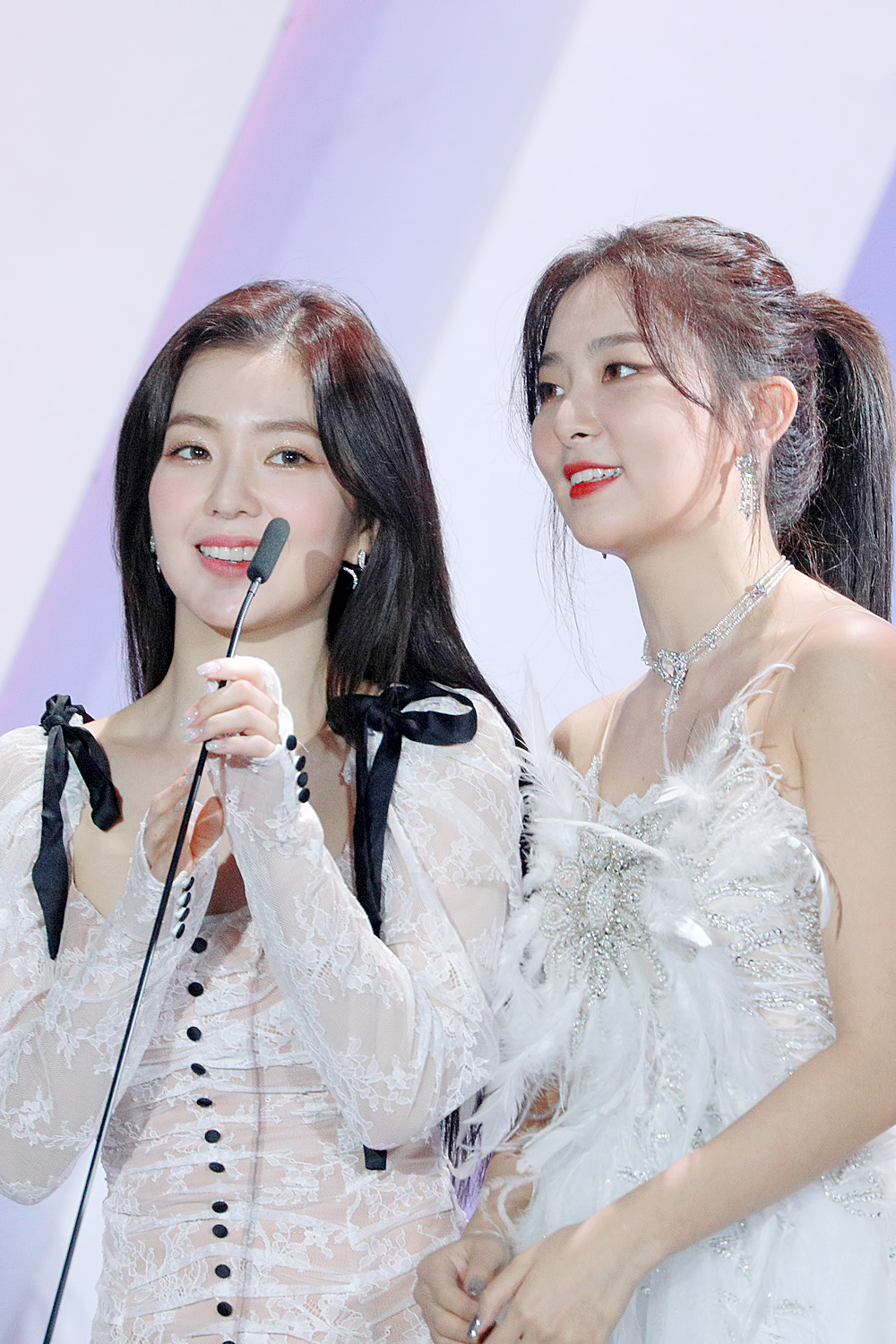
- Irene and Seulgi at Asia Artist Awards in 2019

Background information
- Origin: Seoul, South Korea
- Genres: K-pop; R&B; dance-pop; neo-soul; dubstep
- Years active: 2020; 2025–present
- Label: SM
- Spinoff of: Red Velvet
- Members: Irene; Seulgi
- Website: Official website

Red Velvet – Irene & Seulgi (Korean: 레드벨벳-아이린&슬기) is the first subunit of South Korean girl group Red Velvet, formed by SM Entertainment in 2020. It is composed of members Irene and Seulgi. The duo debuted on July 6, 2020, with the extended play Monster. Their follow-up EP Tilt came out in May 2025.

== History ==
=== 2020: Formation, debut, and Monster ===
On April 21, 2020, SM Entertainment revealed that Irene and Seulgi would form Red Velvet's first sub-unit. On the same day, it was announced that the unit would release their first extended play in June. The release of the extended play was later postponed on the grounds that it needed additional production on the album, in order to achieve a higher quality of music.

Before their debut as members of Red Velvet, the duo, as part of SR14G (SM Rookies 2014 Girls), notably performed a cover of "Be Natural", a song that was sung originally by S.E.S. Their cover was well received by the public and Lee Soo-man, which eventually prompted the creation of their subunit. They also had several performances together during SM Town Live Special Stages.

On July 6, Red Velvet – Irene & Seulgi released their debut extended play Monster, which contained six tracks, including the singles "Monster" and "Naughty". With the release of their debut album, they became the best selling female sub-unit in South Korea in 2020. The duo made their debut performance on July 10 on Music Bank. From July 8 to September 8, the duo also starred in their own reality show, a spin-off of their group's Level Up Project!. On August 18, 2020, Irene & Seulgi appeared and performed at Time 100 Talks, a live event series wherein global leaders talk about innovative solutions to urgent global problems, and encourage cross-disciplinary action among stakeholders. Before their performance of "Monster", they also offered a message of appreciation and support to the frontliners during the COVID-19 pandemic.

=== 2025–present: Tilt and Japanese debut ===
In 2025, SM Entertainment confirmed that the duo would be releasing new music in May of that year. On April 14, they announced their first Asia tour, Balance, kicking off in Seoul on June 14. On May 7, SM Entertainment announced that the duo's second extended play Tilt would be released on May 26, with the lead single of the same name. On December 31, the duo performed at Let's Celebrate 2026 countdown show held in Sentosa Siloso Beach in Singapore.

On September 9, it was announced that the duo would release their first Japanese extended play Cheetah digitally on September 14 and physically on November 4. Following the release, they would hold the Japan tour, Blank, starting from September 19 in seven cities.

== Discography ==
=== Extended plays ===
==== Korean extended plays ====
List of Korean extended plays, showing selected details, selected chart positions, sales figures, and certifications
Title	Details	Peak chart positions						Sales	Certifications
Title	Details	KOR	BEL (FL)	JPN	JPN Hot	UK Down	US World	Sales	Certifications
Monster	Released: July 6, 2020; Label: SM, Dreamus; Formats: CD, digital download, streaming	2	188	21	35	14	5	KOR: 267,743	KMCA: Platinum
Tilt	Released: May 26, 2025; Label: SM, Kakao; Formats: CD, digital download, streaming	5	—	27	—	—	—	KOR: 197,003; JPN: 1,554	

==== Japanese extended plays ====
List of Japanese extended plays, showing selected details
Title	Details	Peak chart positions		Sales
Title	Details	JPN	JPN Hot	Sales
Cheetah	Released: September 14, 2026; Label: SM, Avex Trax; Formats: CD, digital download, streaming; Track listing: 1. "Cheetah"; 2. "Fall 4 U"; 3. "Love Anxiety"; 4. "Wave"; 5. "Free"	6	56	JPN: 10,694

=== Singles ===
==== Korean singles ====
List of Korean singles, showing year released, selected chart positions, and name of the album
Title	Year	Peak chart positions					Album
Title	Year	KOR	MYS	NZ Hot	SGP	US World	Album
"Monster"	2020	8	8	30	5	7	Monster
"Naughty"	2020	— (Note: "Naughty" did not enter the Gaon Digital Chart but peaked at position 83 on the component Download Chart.)	—	—	—	6	Monster
"Tilt"	2025	— (Note: "Tilt" did not enter the Circle Digital Chart but peaked at position 32 on the component Download Chart.)	—	—	—	—	Tilt
"—" denotes releases that did not chart or were not released in that region.

==== Japanese singles ====
List of Japanese singles, showing year released and name of the album
Title	Year	Album
"Cheetah"	2026	Cheetah

=== Other charted songs ===
List of other charted songs, showing year released, selected chart positions, and name of the album
Title	Year	Peak chart positions	Album
Title	Year	KOR Down.	Album
"Diamond"	2020	55	Monster
"Feel Good"	2020	54	Monster
"Jelly"	2020	57	Monster
"Uncover" (Seulgi solo)	2020	74	Monster
"What's Your Problem?" (feat. Julie of Kiss of Life)	2025	56	Tilt
"Irresistible"	2025	71	Tilt
"Girl Next Door"	2025	65	Tilt
"Trampoline"	2025	70	Tilt
"Heaven"	2025	75	Tilt

== Videography ==
=== Music videos ===
Title	Year	Director(s)	Ref.
"Monster"	2020	Kim Ja-kyeong	
"Naughty"	2020	Shim Jae-young (METAOLOZ)	
"Irene"	2020	Shim Jae-young (METAOLOZ)	
"Uncover" (Seulgi solo)	2020	Shim Jae-young (METAOLOZ)	
"Tilt"	2025	Yun	

== Tours ==
=== Headlining ===
- Balance (2025)
- Blank (2026)

== Filmography ==
=== Reality show ===
Year	Title	Network	Notes	Ref.
2020	Level Up Thrilling Project!	Oksusu, KBS Joy, XtvN	Spin-off	

== Awards and nominations ==
Name of the award ceremony, year presented, category, nominee of the award, and the result of the nomination
Award ceremony	Year	Category	Nominee / Work	Result	Ref.
Gaon Chart Music Awards	2021	Artist of the Year (Digital Music) – July	"Monster"	Nominated	
Golden Disc Awards	2021	Album Bonsang	Monster	Nominated	
