= Olympic Hall =

Concert hall in Seoul, South Korea

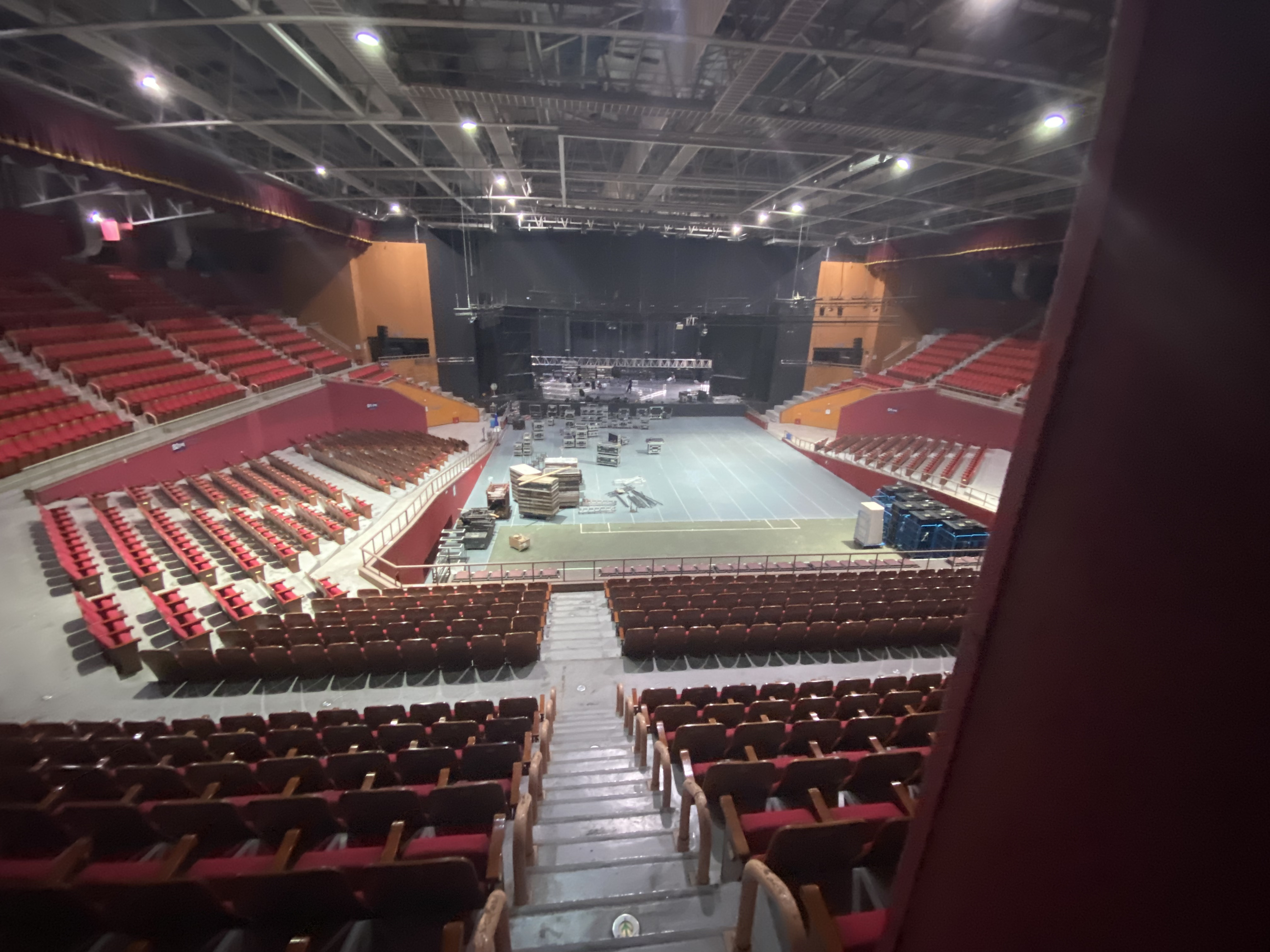
- Olympic Hall interior
- Interactive map of Olympic Hall
- Location: Bangi-dong, Songpa District, Seoul, South Korea
- Coordinates: 37.51471°N 127.12752°E
- Capacity: 2,452

Construction
- Opened: 2003
- Renovated: 2011
- Architect: Kang Kum-hee Architects
- Structural engineer: Geiger Associates

Olympic Hall is a music venue located within the Olympic Park, in Bangi-dong, Songpa District, Seoul, South Korea. It opened in 2003.

In 2011, the Olympic Hall was renovated as a concert hall by the Ministry of Culture, Sports and Tourism and the Korea Sports Promotion Foundation. The one-year remodeling project included an expanded stage for the main hall with 2,452 fixed seats, an exhibition room to showcase the history of Korean pop from the 1920s to present day, and a 240-seat small theater for indie musicians and new artists. It was reopened on June 22, 2011, with a celebration performance by veteran singers and K-pop groups including Super Junior, 2PM, 4Minute, 2NE1 and After School.

== Notable events ==
=== 2010–2012 ===
- Kings of Convenience: Kings of Convenience Live in Seoul – March 2010
- The Swell Season: The Swell Season Live in Seoul – April 7, 2010
- Mika: Mika's Imaginarium Tour – June 11, 2010
- 2NE1: First Live Concert [Nolza] – August 26, 27 and 28, 2011
- MIKA: Mika Live in Seoul – September 20, 2011
- Jay Park: New Breed Live in Seoul – March 3, 2012
- Exo: Debut Showcase — March 31, 2012
- Jay Park: New Breed Asia Tour in Seoul – August 18, 2012
- Sistar: Femme Fatale – September 15, 2012
- Hey! Say! JUMP: Jump World 2012 – June 23 and 24, 2012

=== 2013 ===
- BoA: Here I Am – 2013 Special Live – January 26 and 27
- 2nd Gaon Chart K-Pop Awards – February 13
- B.A.P: B.A.P – Live on earth – February 23 and 24
- Sistar: S – October 12

=== 2014 ===
- Teen Top: Teen Top 2014 World Tour High Kick – February 22 and 23
- BTS: BTS Global Official Fanclub A.R.M.Y 1ST Muster – March 29
- Block B: 2014 Blockbuster – May 17 and 18
- VIXX: 'VIXX Live Fantasia [HEX SIGN] – 18, 19, and July 20
- Mariah Carey: The Elusive Chanteuse Show – October 8
- Taeyang: Rise World Tour – October 10, 11 and 12
- Roy Kim: "Roy Kim Live Tour: HOME 2014" – October 25 and 26
- BtoB: Hello Melody – October 31 and November 1, 2014
- Boyfriend: 2014 Boyfriend, The First Chapter in Seoul "Bewitch" – November 23
- MBLAQ: Curtain Call – November 29 and 30

=== 2015 ===
- Apink: Pink Paradise – January 30 and 31
- BTS: 2015 BTS Live Trilogy Episode I: BTS Begins – March 28 and 29
- Ailee: Fatal Attraction – July 4
- F.T. Island: 2015 F.T. Island Live 'We Will' – August 8 and 9
- Super Junior K.R.Y.: Super Junior-K.R.Y. Asia Tour ~Phonograph~ – August 22 and 23
- Junhou: Last Night in Seoul – September 19 and 20
- SG Wannabe: SG Wannabe comeback concert 'I Wanna Be In You' – October 9 and 10
- Sweet Sorrow: Sweet Sorrow 10th Anniversary Concert – 13, 14, and November 15
- IU: Chat-Shire – November 21 and 22
- Jinusean: 2015 Jinusean Concert 'Jinusean Bomb' – December 13

=== 2016 ===
- f(x): Dimension 4 – Docking Station – January 29, 30 and 31
- 5th Gaon Chart K-Pop Awards – February 17
- Taeyeon: Butterfly Kiss – July 9 and 10
- Mamamoo: 2016 Mamamoo Concert Moosical – August 13 and 14
- Antenna artists: Hello, Antenna: The Label Concert – September 23, 24 and 25

=== 2017 ===
- AOMG: Follow The Movement – February 11 and 12
- Mamamoo: 2017 Mamamoo Concert Moosical: Curtain Call – March 3, 4 and 5
- AOA: AOA 1st Concert 'Ace of Angels' in Seoul – March 11
- Taeyeon: Persona – 12, 13, and May 14
- Monsta X: Beautiful World Tour – June 17 and 18
- Produce 101 Season 2: Finale Concert – July 1 and 2
- Astro: The 1st ASTROAD to Seoul – July 15 and 16
- Lovelyz: Lovelyz 2017 Summer Concert [Alwayz] – July 29 and 30
- Girls' Generation: Girls' Generation 10th Anniversary – Holiday to Remember – August 5
- Boys24: Boys24 The Final – August 12
- Red Velvet: Red Room Tour – August 18, 19 and 20
- Taemin: Taemin 1st Solo Concert: OFF-SICK – August 25, 26 and 27
- Dream Theater: Images, Words & Beyond 25th Anniversary Tour – September 16
- VIXX LR: VIXX LR 1st Concert 'Eclipse' in Seoul – November 18 and 19

=== 2018 ===
- GFriend: Season of GFriend – January 6 and 7
- JBJ: JBJ 1st Concert: A Really Desirable Concert – February 3 and 4
- Day6: Every Day6 Finale Concert — The Best Moments — March 3 and 4
- iKon Private Stage [RE-KONNECT] – March 11
- OneRepublic: 2018 Asia Tour – April 27
- iKon Private Stage [KOLORFUL] – June 9
- Loona: Loonabirth: Debut concert – August 19
- Mayday: Life Tour – September 8
- Stray Kids: Unveil Op. 3: I Am YOU – October 21
- Iz*One: Color*Iz Show-Con – October 29
- Ailee: I AM: Ailee Tour – December 8 and 9

=== 2019 ===
- The Boyz: THE BOYZ FAN-CON <THE CASTLE> – 25, January 26
- Loona: Loonaverse: Concert – 16, February 17
- Lovelyz: Lovelyz 2019 Summer Concert [Alwayz 2] – August 2, 3 and 4
- Blackpink: 2019 Private Stage [Chapter 1] – September 21
- Sekai no Owari: Tour 2019 [The Colors] – November 2
- Stray Kids: World Tour "District 9: Unlock" – November 23 and 24

=== 2020 ===
- Victon: Victon 1st Concert [New World] – January 4 and 5
- Apink: 2020 Apink 6th concert: Welcome to Pink World – February 1 and 2
- Ateez: Ateez World Tour "The Fellowship: Map The Treasure" – February 8 and 9

=== 2021 ===
- Treasure: Treasure 1st Private Stage [Teu-Day] – October 2
- Mino: YG Palm Stage — 2021 Mino: Maniac – November 19
- Kang Seung-yoon: YG Palm Stage — 2021 Yoon: Passage – November 21

=== 2022 ===
- Ateez: Ateez World Tour "The Fellowship: Beginning of the End" – January 7, 8 and 9
- Stray Kids: Stray Kids 2nd #LoveSTAY "SKZ's Chocolate Factory" – February 12 and 13
- Tomorrow X Together: Third Fanlive "Moa X Together" – March 5 and 6
- Cravity: Cravity The 1st Concert [Center of Gravity] – April 2 and 3
- Treasure: Treasure 1st Concert [Trace] – April 9 and 10
- Winner: Winner 2022 Concert [The Circle] – April 30 and May 1
- WJSN: 2022 WJSN Concert [Wonderland] – June 11 and 12
- (G)I-dle: Just Me ( )I-dle World Tour -June 17, 18 and 19
- iKon: "iKon 2022 Concert" – June 25 and 26
- Mamamoo: Mamamoo World Tour [My Con] – November 18, 19 and 20
- Jannabi: Fantastic Old-fashioned End of the Year Party! – 26, November 27, December 31, January 1, 28 and 29
- Xdinary Heroes: Xdinary Heroes Stage ♭: Overture – December 16, 17 and 18, 2022

=== 2023 ===
- Ive: The Prom Queens Tour – February 11 and 12
- Onew: Onew 1st Concert "O-New-Note" – 3, 4, and March 5
- BoA: BoA 20th Anniversary Live "The BoA: Musicality" – March 11 and 12
- Le Sserafim: Le Sserafim Fan Meeting <Fearnada> 2023 S/S – March 18 and 19
- Apink: 2023 Apink Fan Concert <Pink drive> – April 14 and 15
- Cravity: 2023 Cravity The 1st World Tour 'Masterpiece' in Seoul – May 13 and 14
- Hori7on: Hori7on The 1st Album "Friend-Ship" Debut Showcase – July 24
- Park Bo-gum: 12th Anniversary Fanmeeting "Cantabile" – August 11 and 12
- STAYC: 1st World Tour [Teen Fresh] in Seoul – September 23 and 24

=== 2024 ===
- Taeyong: 2024 Taeyong Concert <TY Track> – February 24 and 25
- Cravity: 2024 Cravity Fan-Con <Luvity Games> – April 6 and 7
- Suho: Suho Concert 2024 ‘Welcome To Su:Home’ - May 25 and 26
- Taeyang: The Light Year Tour – August 31 and September 1
- Nam Woo-hyun: 2024 Arbor Day 4 - Concert< Arbor Day 4 - TREEWORLD" Concert> - September 21 and 22
- Cravity: 2024 CRAVITY Fan－Con <BEYOND YOUR MEMORIES> - September 28 and 29
- 2NE1: Welcome Back in Seoul – October 4, 5 and 6
- Illit: Fan Showcase – October 23
- Kiss of Life: KISS OF LIFE 1st World Tour 'KISS ROAD' – October 26 and 27
- Cho Kyu-hyun: 10th Anniversary Asia Tour［COLORS] – December 20, 21 and 22

=== 2025 ===
- Onew: Onew the Live: Connection – February 21, 22, and 23
- Kehlani: Crash World Tour – March 6
- BtoB: Fan-con '3,2,1 Go! MELympic' – March 21,22 and 23
- STAYC: Stay Tuned Tour – April 12 and 13
- Oh My Girl: 2025 OH MY GIRL CONCERT [Milky Way] – April 19 and 20
- Deasung: D's WAVE Asia Tour – April 26 and 27
- Xdinary Heroes: Beautiful Mind World Tour – May 2, 3, 4 and 5
- N.Flying: LIVE ‘＆CON4: FULL CIRCLE’ – May 9, 10 and 11
- Bibi: Eve World Tour – May 16, 17 and 18
- Illit: ILLIT GLITTER DAY IN SEOUL – June 7 and 8
- Red Velvet – Irene & Seulgi: Balance Asia Tour – June 14 and 15
- Viviz: New Legacy World Tour – July 5 and 6
- Jung Yong Hwa: Director’s Cut: Our Fine Days Live – July 18, 19 and 20
- Winner: [IN OUR CIRCLE] Concert – July 26 and 27
- WayV: NO Way OUT Concert Tour – August 2 and 3
- Kang Daniel: ACT: NEW EPISODE Concert – August 9 and 10
- Jvke: Jvke Live in Seoul – August 21
- Gen Hoshino: MAD HOPE Asia Tour – September 13 and 14
- Son TaeJin: It's Son Time Concert – December 6 and 7
- Kyuhyun: The Classic Concert – December 19, 20 and 21

=== 2026 ===
- ONF: 2026 ONF Concert [The Map: Beyond The Horizon] – January 10 and 11
- Ash Island: Burn Concert – January 17 and 18
- Car, the garden: Blue Heart Concert – January 17 and 18
- Mamamoo 2026 World Tour <4WARD> - January 19, 20 and 21
- izna Concert Tour <Who Dat Girl?> - September 19 and 20
- Itzy "The 5th fanmeeting Let's fly! All in Midzy" August 8th and August 9th
