= SM Culture & Contents =

South Korean advertising, production, travel and talent company

SM Culture & Contents Co., Ltd.
- Trade name: SM C&C
- Native name: 에스엠컬처앤콘텐츠
- Formerly: BT&I
- Type: Public
- Traded as: KRX: 048550
- Industry: Advertisement; Entertainment; Travel; Production
- Founded: July 1987; 39 years ago (as Intercontinental Travel Agency)
- Headquarters: Seoul, South Korea
- Key people: Taehyun Park(CEO); Hong Jun-hwa (Head of advertising division)
- Owner: SM Entertainment (30.39%); SK Telecom (22.81%)
- Divisions: Advertising division; Production division; Management division; Travel division
- Website: smcultureandcontents.com

SM Culture & Contents (Korean: 에스엠컬처앤콘텐츠; SM C&C) is a South Korean advertising, production, travel and talent company. The company operates as a talent agency, television content production company, theatrical production company and travel company.

== History ==
=== 1987–2012: Establishment and acquisition by SM Entertainment ===
After being listed on the KOSDAQ in April 2006 through a merger and acquisition with Volvik, a professional golf ball brand, Intercontinental Travel Agency (Note: According to the "History" section of the official SM Town Travel website, Intercontinental Travel Agency was established in July 1987.) changed its name to BT&I (Note: Business Travel and Incentive (BT&I) was described as the "leading business travel agency in Korea" that offered professional services in conducting large-scale seminars, trainings, and incentive tours for companies.) as part of establishing a "more professional" corporate image. On July 11, 2007, Daum Communications announced that it has signed a contract with BT&I to transfer shares and management rights of Tour Express, an online travel agency established in 1999. The company reported that it purchased 90 percent of its shares in Tour Express for eight point six billion won from Daum and Tiger Fund, with Daum handing over 55.27 percent of its 65.27 percent stake in Tour Express for 5.3 billion won. It will be able to expand its business into the online travel market and secure the exclusive right to operate a travel site on the Daum portal in the future. On July 5, 2010, BT&I announced that Hotel Trees, which operates a hotel reservation system globally that a system that can provide "high-quality total travel services" linked to aviation and accommodation, has been incorporated as a subsidiary of the company.

On April 13, 2012, Kim Young-min, the former chief executive officer of SM Entertainment, held a board meeting and announced that it has decided to acquire BT&I by acquiring old and new shares of the company. By April 16, it was reported that the company implemented a third-party allocated capital increase for a total of 2,031.75 million won to SM in order to raise operating funds. It also decided to issue two billion won worth of new equity bond with a maturity rate of four percent until April 13, 2015. SM signed a stock transfer agreement to acquire a total of 3,174,010 shares on BT&I at 1,375 won per share and 43,640,263,750 won in total. Additionally, SM intended to "maximize synergy" between the company's existing tourism, leisure, and travel businesses, with Hallyu and K-pop contents.

On May 29, 2012, it held a general meeting of shareholders to appoint directors, auditors, and change the articles of association; the largest shareholder of the company will be changed from the existing Kang Soo-jung and Song Ki-han to SM. The entertainment company planned to pursue drama production and global video content business in "earnest" through the acquisition of BT&I; while, the remaining business of the company will be promoted by combining it with SM's existing businesses along with the "rapid spreading" of Korean Wave and K-pop fever. On August 17, Kang Ho-dong signed an exclusive contract with now SM Culture & Contents, (Note: According to the "About us" section of the official SM Culture & Contents (SM C&C) website, the company was changed to SM C&C in May 2012.) accompanied by the plans to resume broadcasting activities and to show further improvement through cooperation with the company's management and SM. Moreover, Shin Dong-yup also signed an exclusive contract with the company, stating that he will show different sides through "new and diverse programs" that will create "synergy" with Asia's top singers and actors. With the recruitment of Kang and Shin, SM Entertainment Group has expanded not only the management of existing singers and actors, but also the production of MC management, dramas, and comprehensive broadcasting programs, completing the foundation for becoming a comprehensive entertainment group.

On September 19, 2012, SM C&C stated on a press release that it have merged with AM Entertainment, (Note: AM Entertainment (AMT) was dissolved into the company after the merger.) expanding the company's video and actor management business that planned to target the Asian market.

=== 2013–2016: Mergers and contract signing ===
On January 13, 2013, Gong Hyun-jin signed an exclusive contract with SM C&C and is expected to play as a multi-entertainer in various fields, including dramas, movies and entertainment programs, based on its "systematic and global" management support. On March 14, the company absorbed and merged with Hoon Media at a ratio of 1 to 5.2433197 to increase management efficiency, with a total of 534,889 shares issued. Hoon Media was founded by producer Lee Hoon-hee, who organized and directed a number of entertainment programs such as KBS 2TV's Happy Together, Happy Sunday, Fly Shoot Dori, and Music Bank.

=== 2025–present: Expansion to music management ===
On September 18, 2025, SM C&C announced its participation in productions of SBS music audition program Our Ballad. On December 4, 2025, Our Ballad contestants Min Soo-hyun, Song Ji-woo, Lee Ye-ji, Lee Ji-hoon, Lee Jun-seok, Im Ji-sung, Jeremy, Jeong Ji-woong, Cheon Beom-seok, Choi Eun-bin, and Hong Seung-min signed a contract with SM C&C.

On January 8, 2026, SM C&C won three awards at the Seoul International Advertising Festival 2025.

On January 16, former member of VROMANCE and Singer Again 2 contestant, Park Hyeon-gyu, signed a contract with the company.

== Divisions ==
SM C&C divided into four division:

- Advertising division

Launched as SM C&C from SK Planet M&C (includes SM Entertainment Group)

Location: 83-21, Wangsimni-ro, Seongdong-gu, Seoul, Republic of Korea (HQ)

- Production division

Location: 45, Maebongsan-ro, Mapo-gu, Seoul, Republic of Korea

- Management division

Location: 45, Maebongsan-ro, Mapo-gu, Seoul, Republic of Korea

- Travel division

Location: 83-21, Wangsimni-ro, Seongdong-gu, Seoul, Republic of Korea

== Artists ==
All names listed are adapted from SM Culture & Contents' artist page of its official website.

=== Actors and actresses ===
- Hwang Zia
- Jeong Ji-soo
- Kim Soo-ro
- Kim Jun-hyung
- Lee Hak-joo
- Yu Seung-Mok
- Yoon Je-moon
- Yoon Na-moo
- Lee Hyun-jin
- Bang Min-ah (2024–present)
- Han Jung-wan (2024–present)
- Kim Young-woong
- Cha Seo-rin (2025–present)

=== Entertainers ===
- Han Suk-joon
- Jang Ye-won
- Jang Young-ran
- Jun Hyun-moo
- Kang Ho-dong
- Kim Jun-hyun
- Kim Min-ah
- Lee Jin-ho
- Park Sun-young
- Seo Jang-hoon
- Bae Sung-jae (2024–present)
- Hwang Jaesung
- Kwak Junbin (2024–present)
- Heo Young-ji (2024–present)
- Jang Do-yeon (2025–present)
- Jang Sung-kyu (2025–present)
- Yoon Tae-young
- Son Jung-eun
- Jo Jung-sik
- Kim Ji-hwan (Algoboni Honsusangtae)
- Kim Kyeong-beom (Algoboni Honsusangtae)
- Seo J
- Matsushima Shohei
- Hwang Jae-gyun (2026–present)

=== Singers ===
- Park Hyeong-gyu
- Min Soo-hyun
- Song Ji-woo
- Jeremy Ochuba
- Lee Jun-seok
- Lee Ji-hoon
- Im Ji-seong
- Jeong Ji-woong
- Cheon Beom-seok
- Choi Eun-bin
- Hong Seung-min

== Former artists ==
=== Former actors ===
- Bae Da-bin (2017–2024)
- Han Chae-young (2013–2015)
- Han Ji-min (2012–2013)
- Gong Hyung-jin (2013–2015)
- Jang Dong-gun (2012–2018)
- Jung So-min (2013–2017)
- Kang Ye-won (2013–2018)
- Kim Ha-neul (2012–2018)
- Kim Shi-hoo (2012–2018)
- Moon Ga-young (2012–2018)
- Oh Jung-yeon (2015–2020)
- Ryu Dam (2012–2017)
- Song Jae-rim (2012–2018)
- Yoon So-hee (2012–2018)

=== Former entertainers ===
- Lee Hye-sung (2020–2023)
- Lee Soo-geun (2012–2024)
- Park Sung-kwang (2017–2023)
- Shin Dong-yup (2012–2023)
- Yang Se-chan (2021–2024)
- Lee Yong-jin (2021–2024)

== Production works ==
=== Dramas ===
==== Television series ====
List of television series showing the year, title, network, and associated production
| Year | Title | Network | Associated production | Ref. |
|---|---|---|---|---|
| 2012 | To the Beautiful You | SBS TV | —N/a | |
| 2013 | Prime Minister & I | KBS2 | —N/a | |
| 2013–14 | Miss Korea | MBC | —N/a | |
| 2014 | Mimi | Mnet | —N/a | |
| 2015 | Exo Next Door | Naver TV Cast | with Oh!Boy Project | |
| 2015 | D-Day | JTBC | —N/a | |
| 2015–16 | The Merchant: Gaekju 2015 | KBS | —N/a | |
| 2016 | My Lawyer, Mr. Jo | KBS2 | —N/a | |
| 2016 | Squad 38 | OCN | with Studio Dragon | |
| 2016 | Don't Dare to Dream | SBS | —N/a | |
| 2017 | Missing 9 | MBC | —N/a | |
| 2018 | Should We Kiss First? | SBS TV | —N/a | |
| 2018 | Wok of Love | SBS TV | —N/a | |
| 2018 | Voice 2 | OCN | —N/a | (Note: Originally produced by KeyEast.) |
| 2018–2019 | The Last Empress | SBS TV | —N/a | (Note: Originally produced by SM Life Design Group.) |
| 2019 | Voice 3 | OCN | —N/a | |
| 2019 | At Eighteen | JTBC | —N/a | |
| 2019–2020 | Psychopath Diary | tvN | —N/a | |
| 2020 | Hyena | SBS TV; Netflix | —N/a | |
| 2020 | The School Nurse Files | Netflix | —N/a | |
| 2020 | My Dangerous Wife | MBN | —N/a | |
| 2020–2021 | Live On | JTBC | with JTBC Studios and Playlist Studio | —N/a |
| 2020–2021 | Hush | JTBC | with JTBC Studios | —N/a |
| 2021 | Inspector Koo | JTBC; Netflix | with JTBC Studios and Creative Leaders Group Eight | —N/a |
| 2021–2022 | The One and Only | JTBC | with JTBC Studios | —N/a |

==== Films ====
List of films showing the year, title and associated production
| Year | Title | Associated production | Ref. |
|---|---|---|---|
| 2019 | The Divine Fury | Studio 706 | |

=== Variety shows ===
List of variety shows showing the year, title, and network
| Year | Title | Network | Ref. |
|---|---|---|---|
| 2000–2014 | 1000 Song Challenge | SBS | |
| 2003–2017 | Vitamin | KBS | |
| 2006–present | e-NEWS | tvN | |
| 2007–2018 | 1 VS 100 | KBS2 | |
| 2009–2013 | Qualifications of Men | KBS2 | |
| 2012 | Breakdown Problem - Resolution King | Tooniverse | |
| 2012 | Joy Hug Me | KBS N | |
| 2012–2013 | Classroom Stories | KBS1 | |
| 2012–2013 | Anger King | Channel A | |
| 2012–2013 | My Queen | Story On | |
| 2012–2013 | Inside Story | TV Chosun | |
| 2013 | Star Family Show Mamma Mia | KBS | |
| 2013 | Running wears high heels mother | SBS funE | |
| 2013 | Uh-rap Show! | QTV | |
| 2013 | Funny as Hell | Disney Channel | |
| 2013 | Barefooted Friends | SBS | |
| 2013 | Super Hit | Mnet | |
| 2013 | Celebrity Splash! | MBC | |
| 2013 | We Got Married Global Edition | MBC Every 1 | |
| 2013–2014 | Nangam School | Tooniverse | |
| 2013–2014 | EXO's Showtime | MBC Every1 | |
| 2013–2014 | Shinhwa Broadcast | JTBC | |
| 2013–2015 | Dancing 9 | Mnet | |
| 2013–2016 | Cool Kidz on the Block | KBS | |
| 2013–2016 | The Human Condition | KBS2 | |
| 2014 | XOXO EXO | Mnet | |
| 2014 | EXO 90:2014 | Mnet | |
| 2014–2015 | Super Junior M-Guest House | SBS | |
| 2015 | The Mickey Mouse Club | Disney Channel | |
| 2015 | Rediscovery of Instant Food : Easy Dining Table | TV Chosun | |
| 2015 | f(x)=1cm | Naver TV | |
| 2015–2016 | Global Husband White Paper : My Partner, Husband | KBS2 | |
| 2015–2016 | Same Bed, Different Dreams | SBS | |
| 2015–present | Knowing Bros | JTBC | |
| 2016 | My SMT | Naver TV | |
| 2016–2019 | Life Bar | tvN | |
| 2016–present | NCT Life | Naver TV, Oksusu | |
| 2017 | Victory | Naver TV | |
| 2017–2018 | Hyori's Homestay | JTBC | |
| 2017–2018 | Island Trio | Olive, tvN | |
| 2017–2018 | Shining Star (with Maro Studio and Alpha Culture, Ltd.) | MBC | |
| 2017–2020 | Salty Tour | tvN | |
| 2017–2020 | Red Velvet Level Up Project! | oksusu, XtvN, KBS Joy | |
| 2017–present | SJ Returns | Naver TV, V Live, JTBC2 | |
| 2017–present | Same Bed, Different Dreams 2: You Are My Destiny | SBS | |
| 2018 | Can Love Be Translated | XtvN | |
| 2018 | Super Junior's Super TV | XtvN, tvN, tvN Asia, Mnet Japan | |
| 2018 | Food Diary | tvN | |
| 2018 | Secret Unnie | JTBC4 | |
| 2018 | Girls For Rest | V LIVE, Naver TV | |
| 2018 | TVXQ!’s The 72-Hour | Naver TV, Xtvn, DATV(Japan) | |
| 2018 | Cheongdam Keytchen | KakaoTV, JTBC4 | |
| 2018 | Keyword #BoA | XtvN, V Live, Naver TV | |
| 2018 | Idol Moms | Lifetime Korea | |
| 2018–2019 | EXO's Travel the World through a Ladder of Fortune | Oksusu, XtvN | |
| 2018–2019 | Jinri Market | Naver TV | |
| 2018–present | DoReMi Market | tvN | |
| 2019 | Let's Go, Man Soo Ro | KBS2 | |
| 2019 | Matching Survival 1+1 | KBS2 | |
| 2020 | M-TOPIA | Wavve | |
| 2021 | Street Woman Fighter | Mnet | |
| 2022–present | Street Man Fighter | Mnet | |

=== Documentary ===
- 3D, 4K, UHD Sacred Space: International Joint Production between Korea and France
- Documentary of Artist Lee, Dong Woo: See-Saw (2016–present)
- Documentary of Artist Jang Dong-gun: Be Giving

=== Musical theatre ===
- SACRED SPACES Buddhist Temple Korea (2013)
- Singin' in the Rain (2014)
- Hero in My Heart (2014)
- School Oz Hologram musical (2015)
- In the Heights (2015)
- Christmas in August
