= Life Goes On Tour =

2022 concert tour by Onew

- Japan tour by Onew
- Location: Japan
- Associated album: Life Goes On
- Start date: July 8, 2022
- End date: September 11, 2022
- No. of shows: 8
- Attendance: 60,000

Onew concert chronology
- Life Goes On Tour (2022); O-New-Note (2023)

The Life Goes On Tour, also known as Onew Japan 1st Concert Tour 2022 〜Life Goes On〜, is the first concert tour by South Korean singer Onew, in support of his debut Japanese studio album, Life Goes On. It commenced on July 8, 2022, and concluded on September 11, 2022. The sold-out tour spanned 8 shows across four Japanese cities, attracting approximately 60,000 attendees.

== Background ==
In April, 2022 it was announced that Onew would be making his Japanese debut releasing his first Japanese studio album on July 6 and that he would be embarking on his first Japanese tour on July 8. Six concerts were originally planned, covering four cities. Two additional performances were added later to accommodate demand, taking place on September 10 and 11 at Yoyogi National Gymnasium in Tokyo.

At the concerts, Onew performed all the songs from Life Goes On and at his concert on July 9, at the Nippon Budokan in Tokyo, Onew performed his cover of "Uroko" live with the original singer Motohiro Hata as a surprise performance. On September 9, Onew released his Japanese digital single titled "Dance Whole Day" which was specially prepared to be performed at his last additional concerts. Also in addition to the setlist, the concert had a request corner where Onew sang fan-requested songs a cappella. The last concert of the tour was broadcast live on TBS Television.

== Set list ==
This set list is representative of the shows on September 10, 2022. It does not represent all concerts for the duration of the tour.

1. "Yoake no Sekai"
2. "On the Way"
3. "Life Is..."
4. "Lighthouse"
5. "In the Whale"
6. "Love Phobia"
7. "Beauty"
8. "Sign"
9. "Timepiece"
10. "Uroko"
11. "Yasashii Kiss o Shite"
12. "Everything"
13. "Sunshine"
14. "Life Goes On"

Encore

15. "Dice"
16. "D×D×D" + "Get The Treasure" + "Kimi no Seide" Shinee medley
17. "Osoku Okita Asa ni"
18. "Dance Whole Day"
19. "Kirakira"

== Shows ==
List of concerts, showing date, city, country, venue, and attendance
Date	City	Country	Venue	Attendance
July 8, 2022	Tokyo	Japan	Nippon Budokan	60,000
July 9, 2022	Tokyo	Japan	Nippon Budokan	60,000
August 14, 2022	Fukuoka	Japan	Fukuoka Sunpalace Hall	60,000
August 18, 2022	Aichi	Japan	Nagoya Congress Center Century Hall	60,000
August 22, 2022	Osaka	Japan	Festival Hall	60,000
August 23, 2022	Osaka	Japan	Festival Hall	60,000
September 10, 2022	Tokyo	Japan	Yoyogi National Stadium	60,000
September 11, 2022	Tokyo	Japan	Yoyogi National Stadium	60,000

== DVD and Blu-ray ==
The video album for the tour was released on December 21, 2022, on both DVD and Blu-ray available in two versions. The regular version included the recording of the September 11 concert and the fan club limited version included an additional recording of the July 9 concert and other concert behind-the-scenes and interviews. It sold more than 9,000 copies in the first week.
