= O-New-Note =

2023 concert tour by Onew

- Tour by Onew
- Location: Asia
- Associated album: Circle
- Start date: March 3, 2023
- End date: March 15, 2023
- No. of shows: 5

Onew concert chronology
- Life Goes On Tour (2022); O-New-Note (2023); Onew the Live: Connection (2025)

O-New-Note is the second concert tour by South Korean singer Onew, in support of his first Korean studio album, Circle. It started on March 3, 2023, at the Olympic Hall in Seoul making it the first Korean concert for Onew, and ended with performances in Japan.

== Background ==
On January 26, 2023, it was announced that Onew would hold his first Korean concert, titled O-New-Note, at the Olympic Hall in Seoul on March 4–5 and would also hold the concert at the Yoyogi National Gymnasium in Tokyo, Japan on March 14–15. Tickets for the Korean concert went on sale for fan club members on February 7 and the general public on February 9, via Yes24 Ticket. An additional concert on March 3 was later added after tickets were sold out upon release. The last day of the concert was live-streamed globally online through Beyond Live and was simultaneously watched in 74 regions around the world. Onew premiered songs from his album Circle, including the lead single, at the concerts. At the concert in Japan which attracted 22,000 people, Onew sang a new unreleased Japanese single titled "Inspiration" that was later released digitally on March 22 along with another single titled "Knock On My Door".

== Production ==
The word "Note" from the concert name refers to a scent note of a fragrance. The concert was divided into four different sections and for each, the hall was filled with respective scent notes through installed fragrance sprays as he performed songs that matched the scent. The scent notes were floral, woody, aqua, and Onew note which Onew himself created in the hope of making his concert more memorable for fans.

The concert had a three-sided rotating stage set using an ultra-large turntable with a diameter of seven meters. In addition, an S-shaped curved main LED, color laser, and bubble machine were used during the concert.

== Set list ==
This set list is representative of the show on March 15, 2023. It does not represent all concerts for the duration of the tour.

1. "Sunshine"
2. "Anywhere"
3. "Sign"
4. "On the Way"
5. "Paradise"
6. "Dice"
7. "Yeowoobi"
8. "Love Phobia"
9. "Cough"
10. "Always"
11. "Under the Starlight" + "Timepiece" + "Mind Warning" medley
12. "Illusion"
13. "In the Whale"
14. "Expectations"
15. "Beauty"
16. "No Parachute"

Encore

17. "O (Circle)"
18. "Inspiration"
19. "Shine on You"
20. "Your Scent"

== Shows ==
Key
| † | Indicates performance streamed simultaneously on Beyond Live |

List of concerts, showing date, city, country, venue, and attendance
| Date | City | Country | Venue | Attendance |
|---|---|---|---|---|
| March 3, 2023 | Seoul | South Korea | Olympic Hall | |
| March 4, 2023 | Seoul | South Korea | Olympic Hall | |
| March 5, 2023 † | Seoul | South Korea | Olympic Hall | |
| March 14, 2023 | Tokyo | Japan | Yoyogi National Gymnasium | 22,000 |
| March 15, 2023 | Tokyo | Japan | Yoyogi National Gymnasium | 22,000 |
