= Super Junior's Super TV =

South Korean variety show

- Hangul: 슈퍼TV
- RR: Syupeo TV
- MR: Syup'ŏ TV
- Genre: Variety Show
- Written by: Lee Ye Ji
- Directed by: Chun Myung Hyun
- Creative director: Lee Ye Ji
- Starring: Super Junior
- Opening theme: Smith Sumner
- Country of origin: South Korea
- Original language: Korean

Production
- Executive producers: Lee Hun-hee, Kim Dong-jun
- Producer: Park Ju Mi
- Production location: South Korea
- Production company: S.M. Culture & Contents

Original release
- Network: XtvN, tvN, tvN Asia, Mnet Japan
- Release: January 26 – August 23, 2018

Super TV (Korean: 슈퍼TV) is a Korean variety show by Super Junior distributed by XtvN and tvN. The show aired on Xtvn every Thursday at 08:00 PM KST and tvN every Friday at 6:40 PM KST. Originally, it was on air on both stations every Friday at 11:30 PM KST before being moved on June 7, 2018.

== History ==
Super Junior made a success with their own short reality show SJ Returns back in 2017 and promised to come back as a fixed reality show. On January 2, 2018, a source from Label SJ announced that the group will be launching their own variety show titled "Super TV". Season 1 aired from January 28, 2018, until April 13, 2018. The show went on hiatus after that and returned on May 29, 2018, with an earlier introduction on SMTOWN's V Live channel.

Season 2 aired from June 7, 2018 until August 23, 2018. On this season, the show changed its format. The programme changed its day and time slot from every Friday at 11:30 PM KST to every Thursday at 08:00 PM KST for Xtvn and every Friday at 6:40 PM KST for tvN . On 23 August, the show went on hiatus again and promised to come back for a third season.

== Plot ==
=== Season 1: Super Junior Crazy Idol Variety ===
Super TV is a new concept variety show in which varied entertainment formats are re-created and twisted in Super Junior's own way. This concept is called Super Junior Crazy Idol Variety (슈퍼주니어 i돌아이어티). The show's format will include quiz show, talk show, game show, eating show, reality, documentary, sports, film and comedy.

=== Season 2: King's Game ===
Super TV returns with a new concept variety show titled Game of Thrones (왕좌의 게임). Super Junior is famous for being King of Variety Show idols and will invite any idols who want to challenge them for the title. The show will still include the previous season's format, the difference being other idols will challenge them. If they can win 5 episodes in a row, they will go for a luxury holiday overseas. The term was changed from episode 8, to just 3 consecutive wins for a vacation within South Korea.

Each episode has two main segments. The first one is Liar King (라이어 왕), a segment where Super Junior verifies if the guests' listed skills and specialties are true. This is done through games or showing of talents, where the guests are labeled as "liars" should they fail the verification.

The second segment consists of a maximum of two games that Super Junior has chosen to challenge the guests:

- Rokkuko King (로꾸거 왕) – Questions are being read backwards by each team and the opposing team will have to answer them correctly.
- Food Show King (먹방 왕) – The game played in this segment is related to eating.
- Inference King (추리 왕) – One team will be given a title of movie or song and they need to say one syllable each at the same time. The opposing team will have to answer the title correctly.
- Chair King (의자 왕) – The teams battle through chair-curling.
- Acting King (연기 왕) – The game played in this segment is related to acting.
- Relay King (릴레이 왕) - A battle of cohesiveness.
- Mission King (미션 왕) - A game to clear away all their mission cards.
- Escape King (탈출 왕) - A game where each team must find clues and solve several difficult puzzles to escape.
- Speed King (스피드 왕) - A battle of agility.
- Description King (묘사 왕)
- Dance King (댄스 왕)
- Flexibility King (유연상 왕)
- Ladder King (사다리 왕)

=== Special Episode: Member TV ===
Member TV is a special episode of Super TV that was only aired on V Live and YouTube. In this special episode, the members show their daily lives or their own special segment.

== Cast ==
The show's cast is made up of Super Junior members.

Duration	Members
Season 1, 2	Leeteuk hashtag: #아이돌계허참 #진행중독자 #시도때도없이설정 #관종대장
Season 1, 2	Heechul hashtag: #걸그룹한정에너자이저 #명실상부예능대세 #원동력은칼퇴 #아이돌백과사전
Season 1, 2	Yesung hashtag: #슈주대표몰이캐 #희로애락발라더 #문제적발라더 #감정이롤러코스터급
Season 1, 2	Shindong hashtag: #동그리동도사 #신들린순발력 #열일하는동크라테스 #슈주내무게중심
Season 1, 2	Eunhyuk hashtag: #만년예능기대주 #예성저격수 #멸치말고다른건없나 #이특아님진짜아님
Season 1, 2	Donghae hashtag: #이제는프로예능인 #떠오르는예능블루칩 #근데진행울렁증 #33살예능베이비
Season 2	Siwon hashtag: #캡틴코리아 #무한긍정맨 #할리우드리액션 #표정만100만개
Season 2	Ryeowook (start from Ep 11)

== Episodes ==
=== Season 1 ===
List of episodes in Season 1 (episodes 1–12)

Ep. #	Air Date	Title	Remarks
1	January 26, 2018	Our Identity	The members discuss about their characters in the show and rules they will adhere to.
2	February 2, 2018	Escape The Restaurant	The members play an up-scaled version of the 'Escape The Restaurant' game they played during SJ Returns. Each member will be trapped within the restaurant and must escape. Otherwise, they will have to keep eating whichever food they land on the game board. They also competed with famous Mukbang vlogger "Banzz".
3	February 9, 2018	Frugal Global Quiz	The members have a quiz show featuring foreign guests from China (Zhang Yu'an), Egypt (Samy Rashad), India (Abhishek Gupta), Thailand (Tatchara Longprasert), Mexico (Christian Burgos) and France (Fabien Yoon). The questions are asked in the guests' native languages and the members have to answer accordingly.
4	February 16, 2018	Speaking Korean Quiz	The members will be doing a quiz show again with the same guests from the previous episode. However, the guests will be answering questions asked by the members in Korean. This episode was aired in conjunction with the Korean New Year, which is a public holiday in South Korea.
5	February 23, 2018	Before Sunrise	A female guest joins the members for a trip to Jeongdongjin, of which the theme was based on the movie Before Sunrise. The members attempt to win the guest's heart while pitting against one another, or be eliminated, as the episode's challenge. Kim Saeng-min made a special appearance as a narrator.
6	March 2, 2018	Before Sunrise pt. 2	After 4 rounds of elimination on the train, the show's concept changes to avatar blind dating upon arriving at a café, unbeknownst to the surviving members' knowledge. The surviving members have to follow instructions given by the eliminated members, who are observing from another place.
7	March 9, 2018	Battle To Leave Work	Each of the members prepared a theme for their individual live broadcast on their Instagram accounts. They must obtain a combined total of 100,000 viewers simultaneously on their live shows within 2 hours to receive a cash prize and leave early. However, if they are unable to do so, they must pay a fine.
8	March 16, 2018	We Lived Together	Three pairs of two members most awkward with each other are coupled together to stay at a studio apartment for 2 days and 1 night. The episode's concept was a twist of Korean variety show We Got Married.
9	March 23, 2018	We Lived Together pt. 2	This is the continuation of the previous episode. In this episode, the member couples will show how they spend the night as they open up themselves more to each other. The staff held an election for the best couple at the end of the episode.
10	March 30, 2018	Problematic Man	The members are observing the daily lives of the members who got chosen as the most problematic and least problematic in the group through voting among themselves. This episode's concept was a twist of Korean variety show Problematic Men.
11	April 6, 2018	Spring Sports Day (with Girl Groups)	The members are split into 6 and each will become the captain of 1 of the girl groups (CLC, Cosmic Girls, Gugudan, Weki Meki, Fromis 9; Cosmic Girls is split into 2 teams). This episode was a twist of famous Korean idol event Idol Star Athletics Championships. Each member also shows their own way of leading a team. Comedian Kim Tae-hyun and gaming commentator Kim Jung-min guested as commentators for the whole event.
12	April 13, 2018	Spring Sports Day (with Girl Groups) pt. 2	This is the continuation of the previous episode, as in previous episode the competition was focused on the team members while in this episode the competition is focused on their team leaders. This is also the final episode of Season 1.

=== Season 2 ===
List of episodes in Season 2 (episode 1 - 12)

Ep. #	Air Date	Guest	Challenges	Remark(s)
1	June 7, 2018	AOA	6 vs 6: Liar King: The members compete with AOA according to the latter's talents each of them claim to possess to prove where they lied or not.; Rokkuko King: Questions are being read backwards by each team and the opposing team will have to answer them correctly.; Food Show King: Escape The Restaurant (Super Junior's special game)	Eunhyuk was absent as he was filming in Switzerland
2	June 14, 2018	Lovelyz	6 vs 8: Liar King: The members compete with Lovelyz according to the latter's talents each of them claim to possess to prove where they lied or not.; Inference King: One team will be given a title of movie or song and they need to say one syllable each at the same time and the opposing team will have to answer the title correctly.; Chair King: Chair Curling (Super Junior's special game)	Eunhyuk was absent as he was filming in Switzerland
3	June 21, 2018	Shinee	7 vs 3: Liar King: The members compete with Shinee according to the latter's talents each of them claim to possess to prove where they lied or not.; Rokkuko King: Questions are being read backwards by each team and the opposing team will have to answer them correctly. As Shinee are less on people, 2 Super Junior members were transferred to Shinee team.	Shinee member Taemin was absent due to other schedules
4	June 28, 2018	Oh My Girl	7 vs 7: Liar King: The members compete with Oh My Girl according to the latter's talents each of them claim to possess to prove where they lied or not.; Food Show King: Finish The Lunchbox - This game is designed under a class situation where the members and Oh My Girl need to finish their lunchboxes and drinks during class without getting caught by the teacher; whichever team finishes first wins.; Inference King: One team will be given a title of movie or song and they need to say one syllable each at the same time and the opposing team will have to answer the title correctly.	Comedian Park Sung-kwang made a special appearance as the teacher
5	July 5, 2018	Weki Meki	7 vs 8: Liar King: The members compete with Weki Meki according to the latter's talents each of them claim to possess to prove where they lied or not.; Rokkuko King: Questions are being read backwards by each team and the opposing team will have to answer them correctly.	
6	July 12, 2018	(G)I-DLE	7 vs 6: Liar King: The members compete with (G)I-DLE according to the latter's talents each of them claim to possess to prove where they lied or not.; Acting King: This challenge consists of two parts. The first part is "Who's Not Saying", whereby one team will each say the same word at the same time and the opposing team will have to guess who did not say the word. The second part is "Who's Not Listening", whereby one team will each listen to music with earphones on at the same time and the opposing team will have to guess who did not play a song.; Relay King: Cohesiveness Battle - One team will form a line side by side and have to use only their feet to move slippers or heels from one basket to another basket that was placed on the other side of the line in 3 minutes. The team with more slippers or heels moved wins.	
7	July 19, 2018	KARD	7 vs 4: Liar King: The members compete with KARD according to the latter's talents each of them claim to possess to prove where they lied or not.; Mission King: Each team starts with 3 mission cards on their hands, and for each turn, one team will throw in one of their mission cards and has to complete the mission based on it. If they succeed in the mission, that card will be cleared away. If they failed the mission they will have to draw a new mission card. However, the opposing team can then choose to challenge the same failed mission and if they managed to succeed, the other team will have to draw a new mission card. The first team to clear away all their mission cards wins.	
8	July 26, 2018	YDPP	6 vs 4: Liar King: The members compete with YDPP according to the latter's talents each of them claim to possess to prove where they lied or not.; Escape King: Car Escape - Similar to the game of Rush Hour, each team has to get the yellow ride-on car out of the specified exit by moving the ride-on cars around within 60 seconds. Hitting the walls or the other ride-on cars, or exceeding the time limit results in a turnover and the other team can attempt at the same puzzle. The team with more puzzles solved wins.	Heechul was absent due to other schedules; YDPP is a four-member project boy group which consists of MXM, Jeong Se-woon and Lee Kwang-hyun; The rule of 5 consecutive wins has been adjusted to 3 for a vacation within the country
9	August 2, 2018	Momoland	7 vs 8: Liar King: The members compete with Momoland according to the latter's talents each of them claim to possess to prove where they lied or not.; Speed King: Erase Your Name - Each team consists of the erasers and the writers. The writers have to write their opposite team members' names on the white board and if a name stays for 3 seconds, the person with the name is eliminated from the game. The erasers' role is to protect their members' names by erasing them before the 3 seconds elapse.	Momoland member Nayun was absent as she is currently on hiatus
10	August 9, 2018	Red Velvet	7 vs 5: Liar King: The members compete with Red Velvet according to the latter's talents each of them claim to possess to prove where they lied or not.; Mission King: Each team starts with 3 mission cards on their hands, and for each turn, one team will throw in one of their mission cards and has to complete the mission based on it. If they succeed in the mission, that card will be cleared away. If they failed the mission they will have to draw a new mission card. However, the opposing team can then choose to challenge the same failed mission and if they managed to succeed, the other team will have to draw a new mission card. The first team to clear away all their mission cards wins.	
11	August 16, 2018	Super Healing Trip pt.1 After 3 consecutive wins, the members get a luxurious trip to Jeju. The trip was held on the same day as Ryeowook's discharge from the army and Heechul's birthday. The members planned to pick up Ryeowook first before heading to Jeju. They played rock-paper-scissors and the winners will pick him up, while the losers have to go to Jeju beforehand to prepare the surprise party for Ryeowook. Ryeowook doesn't know if the losing members are going.		Ryeowook joins the cast
12	August 23, 2018	Super Healing Trip pt.2 The episode is continued from the last episode. In this episode members were given letters hand written by Ryeowook. They received a mission to show their 14 years friendship by doing an "Arcade Game Relay", where they need to win all arcade games that have been chosen to win a luxurious dinner. This was the last episode of Season 2.		Leeteuk, Heechul, Yesung and Shindong left during the BBQ party due to scheduling conflict

=== Special Episode ===
List of Special Episode

Member
Heechul TV
Yesung TV
Shindong TV
Eunhyuk TV
SUPER JUNIOR IN DUBAI PART 1 (Donghae TV & Yesung TV)
SUPER JUNIOR IN DUBAI PART 2 (Super TV the Beginning)
Heechul TV (Guest : Shindong and sportscaster Park Jong-yun)

== Ratings ==
In the ratings below, the highest rating for the show will be in red, and the lowest rating for the show will be in blue episode.

=== Season 1 ===
Ep. #	Broadcast Date	AGB Ratings		TNmS Ratings
Ep. #	Broadcast Date	Nationwide	Seoul National Capital Area	Nationwide
tvN
1	January 26, 2018	-	-	-
2	February 2, 2018	1.3%	1.5%	1.1%
3	February 9, 2018	1.6%	1.8%	1.3%
4	February 16, 2018	-	-	-
5	February 23, 2018	0.9%	NR	1.3%
6	March 2, 2018	0.8%	NR	0.8%
7	March 9, 2018	0.5%	NR	0.7%
8	March 16, 2018	1.0%	NR	0.8%
9	March 23, 2018	0.8%	NR	0.8%
10	March 30, 2018	0.6%	NR	0.5%
11	April 6, 2018	0.8%	NR	0.5%
12	April 13, 2018	0.5%	NR	0.4%

- Note that the show airs on a cable channel (pay TV), which plays part in its slower uptake and relatively small audience share when compared to programs of terrestrial free-to-air networks such as KBS, SBS, MBC or EBS.
- NR rating means "not reported". The rating is low.
- Episode 1 and 4 were only aired on XtvN, not tvN, where the ratings are coming from
