= Tilt (EP) =

- Digital cover

EP by Red Velvet – Irene & Seulgi
- Released: May 26, 2025
- Length: 17:25
- Language: Korean
- Labels: SM; Kakao
- Producers: Jacob Ubizz; Cutfather; Young Jake; IMLAY; Pdogg; GHSTLOOP; Tom Levesque; Cameron George Breithaupt; Kirsten Frances Urbas; Kenzie; Moonshine; No2zcat; Goldash; Wesley Singerman; Waine

Red Velvet – Irene & Seulgi chronology
Monster (2020)	Tilt (2025)	Cheetah (2026)

Singles from Tilt
- 1. "Tilt" Released: May 26, 2025

Tilt is the second extended play by South Korean duo Red Velvet – Irene & Seulgi, a sub-unit of South Korean girl group Red Velvet. It was released by SM Entertainment on May 26, 2025, and contains six tracks, including the lead single of the same name.

== Background and release ==
In February 2025, SM Entertainment announced in its roadmap that Red Velvet – Irene & Seulgi would make their comeback in the second quarter of 2025. On April 11, 2025, SM Entertainment announced that Red Velvet – Irene & Seulgi would be releasing new music in the following month.

On May 7, it was announced that the duo would be releasing their second extended play titled Tilt alongside the lead single of the same name on May 26. A brand film video teaser was also released on the same day. The promotional schedules were released on May 7. Each teaser images and brand image clips were released on May 12, May 13, May 14, May 15, and May 16. A highlight clip video was released on May 20. Each music video teaser images were released on May 21, May 22, and May 23. The music video teaser for "Tilt" was released on the same day. The extended play was released alongside the music video for "Tilt" on May 26.

== Composition ==
Tilt contains six tracks. The title track, was described as a highly addictive pop dance song that blends a restrained R&B groove with a powerful electronic beat. The track explores the theme of mutual growth in a relationship, not as a contest of winners and losers, but as a journey toward building balance together. With its emotionally charged arrangement and thoughtful lyrics, it delivers a nuanced message about connection, harmony, and shared strength.

The second track, "What's Your Problem?", is a modern reinterpretation of the 1990s hip-hop R&B sound, blending nostalgic elements with a contemporary edge. Adding a bold layer of synergy, Julie of Kiss of Life joins as a rap feature, enhancing the track's dynamic energy and empowering message. The third track, "Irresistible", is an R&B pop dance song driven by rhythmic acoustic guitar and captivating vocals that create a subtly mysterious atmosphere. The lyrics narrate the process of falling under the spell of an alluring presence, only to reveal, in a playful twist at the end, that the object of fascination is oneself. The fourth track, "Girl Next Door", is a pop dance track that showcases powerful vocal performances set against an upbeat, rhythmic drum foundation.

The fifth track, "Trampoline", is an R&B pop dance song that stands out for its haunting and immersive atmosphere. The lyrics convey a deep yearning for someone to become the sole light that guides you through a dark night, shining endlessly with unwavering brightness. The sixth and final track, "Heaven", was described as an R&B pop dance track that blends a simple drum pattern with layered synths, keyboards, and distorted guitars to create a dreamy, groove-laden soundscape.

== Promotion ==
On April 14, they announced their first Asia tour, Balance, kicking off in Seoul on June 14.

Prior to the release of Tilt, on May 26, 2025, the duo held a live event called "Red Velvet – Irene & Seulgi 'Tilt' Countdown Live" on YouTube, TikTok and Weverse, aimed at introducing the extended play and connecting with their fanbase.

== Track listing ==
Tilt track listing
No.	Title	Lyrics	Music	Arrangement	Length
1.	"Tilt"	Danke; Moon Yeo-reum (Jam Factory); Bong Eun-young (Jam Factory); Kim Chae-ah (153/Joombas); Lee Seu-ran	Mich Hansen; Jacob Ubizz; Rachel Furner; Hight; Maria Marcus	Ubizz; Cutfather; Young Jake; Imlay	3:04
2.	"What's Your Problem?" (featuring Julie of Kiss of Life)	Jo Yoon-kyung; Na Jeong-ah (153/Joombas); Shin Sa-gang (XYXX)	Pdogg; Arineh Karimi; Ghstloop; Tom Levesque	Pdogg; Ghstloop; Levesque	2:55
3.	"Irresistible"	Lee Seu-ran	Cameron George Breithaupt; Kirsten Frances Urbas	Breithaupt; Urbas	2:57
4.	"Girl Next Door"	Kenzie	Kenzie; Jonatan Gusmark; Ludvig Evers; Cazzi Opeia; Adrian McKinnon	Kenzie; Moonshine	2:53
5.	"Trampoline"	Lee Eun-hwa (153/Joombas); Yoon So-young (153/Joombas)	No2zcat; Lua Kim; Kyle Wong; Lilja Aaroe Scarfi; Goldash	No2zcat; Goldash	2:36
6.	"Heaven"	Kim Su-ji (Lalala Studio); Jeon Gan-dhi; True (153/Joombas); Moon Seol-ri	Nicole "Kole" Cohen; Connor McElwain; Wesley Singerman; Allison Bennett	Singerman; Waine	3:00
Total length:					17:25

== Credits and personnel ==
Credits adapted from the EP's liner notes.

Studio

- SM Aube Studio – recording (1, 3–6), digital editing (3), engineered for mix (2–3)
- Dogg Bounce – recording, digital editing (2)
- Standard Friends – recording, digital editing (2)
- SM Yellow Tail Studio – digital editing, engineered for mix (1)
- SM Droplet Studio – digital editing (4)
- Doobdoob Studio – digital editing (5)
- SM Big Shot Studio – digital editing, engineered for mix, mixing (6)
- SM Blue Ocean Studio – mixing (1)
- SM Blue Cup Studio – mixing (2)
- SM Concert Hall Studio – mixing (3)
- Klang Studio – mixing (4)
- SM Starlight Studio – mixing (5)
- 821 Sound – mastering (all)

Personnel

- SM Entertainment – executive producer
- Irene – vocals (all), background vocals (4, 6)
- Seulgi – vocals (all), background vocals (3–6)
- Julie – featured vocals (2)
- Mich Hansen (Cutfather) – producer (1)
- Jacob Ubizz – producer (1)
- Pdogg – producer (2), vocal directing (2), MIDI programming (2), recording (2), digital editing (2)
- Arineh Karimi – background vocals (2)
- Ghstloop – producer (2), vocal directing (2), background vocals (2), MIDI programming (2), recording (2), digital editing (2)
- Tom Levesque – producer (2), trumpet (2)
- Cameron George Breithaupt – producer (3)
- Kirsten Frances Urbas – producer (3)
- Kenzie – producer (4), vocal directing (1, 4)
- Jonatan Gusmark (Moonshine) – producer (4)
- Ludvig Evers (Moonshine) – producer (4)
- No2zcat – producer (5), vocal directing (5), synthesizer (5)
- Goldash – producer (5), synthesizer (5)
- Connor McElwain (Waine) – producer (6)
- Wesley Singerman – producer (6)
- Jsong – background vocals (1, 3–4, 6)
- Sumin – background vocals (2), recording (2), digital editing (2)
- G-High – vocal directing (3)
- Se.A – vocal directing (5)
- Une – background vocals (5)
- Sam Carrter – vocal directing (6)
- Kim Hyo-joon – recording (1, 3–6), digital editing (3), engineered for mix (2–3)
- Noh Min-ji – digital editing (1), engineered for mix (1)
- Kim Joo-hyun – digital editing (4)
- Eugene Kwon – digital editing (5)
- Lee Min-kyu – digital editing (6), engineered for mix (6), mixing (6)
- Kim Cheol-sun – mixing (1)
- Jung Eui-seok – mixing (2)
- Nam Koong-jin – mixing (3)
- Koo Jong-pil – mixing (4)
- Hong Jang-mi – mixing assistant (4)
- Jeong Yoo-ra – mixing (5)
- Kwon Nam-woo – mastering (all)

== Charts ==
=== Weekly charts ===
Weekly chart performance for Tilt
Chart (2025)	Peak position
Japanese Albums (Oricon)	27
Japanese Digital Albums (Oricon)	41
Japanese International Albums (Oricon)	27
Japanese Download Albums (Billboard Japan)	37
Japanese Top Albums Sales (Billboard Japan)	21
South Korean Albums (Circle)	5
UK Album Downloads (Official Charts)	94

=== Monthly charts ===
Monthly chart performance for Tilt
Chart (2025)	Peak position
South Korean Albums (Circle)	17

== Release history ==
Release history for Tilt
Region	Date	Format	Label
South Korea	May 26, 2025	CD	SM; Kakao
Various	May 26, 2025	Digital download; streaming	SM; Kakao
