= Balance (Red Velvet – Irene & Seulgi tour) =

2025 concert tour by Red Velvet – Irene & Seulgi

Irene & Seulgi Concert Tour [Balance] in Asia
- Asia tour by Red Velvet – Irene & Seulgi
- Location: Asia
- Associated album: Tilt
- Start date: June 14, 2025
- End date: September 25, 2025
- Legs: 1
- No. of shows: 9

Balance (stylized as 2025 IRENE & SEULGI Concert Tour [BALANCE] in ASIA) is the first concert tour headlined by Red Velvet – Irene & Seulgi, the first sub-unit of a South Korean girl group Red Velvet, in support of their second extended play Tilt (2025). The tour began on June 14, 2025 in Seoul and concluded on September 25, 2025 in Tokyo. The tour consists of nine concerts across seven countries in Asia. It is their first concert since their debut in 2020.

== Background ==
On April 11, 2025, SM Entertainment announced that Red Velvet – Irene & Seulgi would be releasing new music in May 2025. Later on April 14, SM Entertainment announced that they would hold their first Asian tour, titled "Balance", since their debut in 2020. The tour is set to kick off with two consecutive shows at the Olympic Hall in South Korea from June 14 to June 15.

== Set list ==
The following set list is from the concert on June 14, 2025, in Seoul, South Korea, and is not intended to represent all shows throughout the tour.

Act I – Red Velvet – Irene & Seulgi

1. "Tilt"
2. "Feel Good"
3. "Trampoline"
4. "Diamond"
5. "Naughty"

Act II – Seulgi

1. "Praying"
2. "Dead Man Runnin'"
3. "Rollin' (With My Homies)"
4. "Better Dayz"

Act III – Red Velvet – Irene & Seulgi

1. "Be Natural"
2. "Irresistible"

Act IV – Irene

1. "Strawberry Silhouette"
2. "Calling Me Back"
3. "Ka-Ching"
4. "Start Line"

Act V – Red Velvet – Irene & Seulgi

1. "What's Your Problem?"
2. "Heaven"
3. "Like A Flower" (Irene solo)
4. "Baby, Not Baby" (Seulgi solo)
5. "Girl Next Door"
6. "Monster"

Encore

1. "Jelly"
2. "Power Up"
3. "Zimzalabim"

=== Surprise encore songs ===
The following songs were performed by Red Velvet – Irene & Seulgi as surprise song during the encore act:

- June 15 – Seoul: "Red Flavor"
- July 4 – Singapore: "Hit That Drum"
- July 12 – Macau: "Hit That Drum" and "Red Flavor"
- July 19 – Bangkok: "Hit That Drum"
- August 3 – Taipei: "Hit That Drum" and "Red Flavor"
- September 13 – Kuala Lumpur: "You Better Know" and "Red Flavor"

== Tour dates ==
Concert dates
Date	City	Country	Venue
June 14, 2025	Seoul	South Korea	Olympic Hall
June 15, 2025	Seoul	South Korea	Olympic Hall
July 4, 2025	Singapore		The Star Theatre
July 12, 2025	Macau	China	The Londoner Arena
July 19, 2025	Bangkok	Thailand	Paragon Hall
August 3, 2025	Taipei	Taiwan	Taipei International Convention Center
September 13, 2025	Kuala Lumpur	Malaysia	Mega Star Arena
September 24, 2025	Tokyo	Japan	Tokyo Garden Theatre
September 25, 2025	Tokyo	Japan	Tokyo Garden Theatre
Total
