= List of Day6 concert tours =

Day6 concert tours
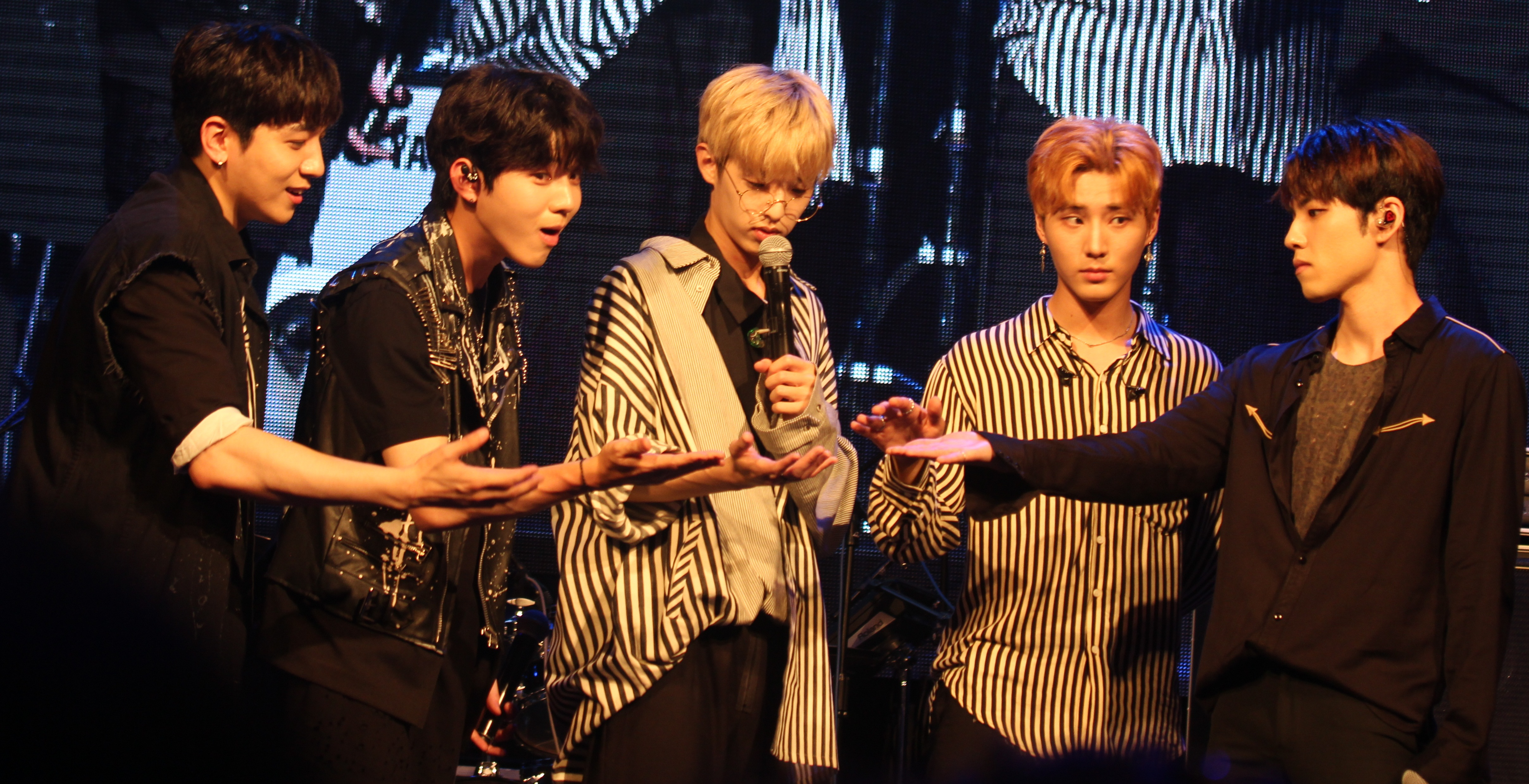
- Day6 at Live & Meet in Taiwan, 2017
- Tours: 4
- Concerts: 5
- Others: 3

South Korean pop rock band Day6 held their debut concert "D-Day" on November 21–22, 2015. They held 30 concerts during the Every Day6 project as they performed two to three times a month in Seoul in 2017. It includes the Finale Concert "The Best Moments" and four shows in Busan, Daegu and Daejeon which took place in early 2018. They completed their first world tour in January 2019: in seven months, they performed in 16 countries and 24 cities. They went on their first Japan tour in October 2018. In December 2024, Day6 became the first Korean band to perform at the Gocheok Sky Dome, where they drew 38,000 people over two days.

== Tours ==
=== Day6 First World Tour "Youth" (2018–2019) ===
Date	City	Country	Venue	Attendance
June 22, 2018	Seoul	South Korea	Olympic Hall	9,000
June 23, 2018	Seoul	South Korea	Olympic Hall	9,000
June 24, 2018	Seoul	South Korea	Olympic Hall	9,000
July 21, 2018	Ulsan	South Korea	Ulsan KBS Hall	—
August 5, 2018	Jeonju	South Korea	Sori Arts Center of Jeollabuk-do	—
August 10, 2018	Melbourne	Australia	Palais Theatre	—
August 12, 2018	Sydney	Australia	Enmore Theatre	—
August 18, 2018	Busan	South Korea	Busan KBS Hall	—
September 1, 2018	Taipei	Taiwan	Taipei International Convention Center	2,200
September 15, 2018	Bangkok	Thailand	MCC Hall The Mall Bangkapi	—
October 6, 2018	Quezon City	Philippines	Kia Theatre	2,500
October 13, 2018	Daegu	South Korea	Chunma Arts Center	—
November 9, 2018	Toronto	Canada	Roy Thomson Hall	—
November 11, 2018	Minneapolis	United States	State Theatre	2,060
November 14, 2018	Atlanta	United States	Cobb Energy Performing Arts Centre	—
November 16, 2018	Philadelphia	United States	Tower Theater	—
November 18, 2018	Los Angeles	United States	The Novo	2,400
November 23, 2018	São Paulo	Brazil	Grande Auditorio-Anhembi	—
November 26, 2018	Santiago	Chile	Teatro Caupolicán	—
December 8, 2018	Jakarta	Indonesia	The Kasablanka Main Hall	—
January 18, 2019	Moscow	Russia	Glavclub	—
January 20, 2019	Madrid	Spain	La Riviera	—
January 22, 2019	Berlin	Germany	Columbiahalle	—
January 25, 2019	London	England	O2 Forum Kentish Town	—
January 27, 2019	Paris	France	Casino de Paris	—
January 29, 2019	Amsterdam	Netherlands	The Box	—
March 30, 2019	Seoul	South Korea	SK Olympic Handball Gymnasium	9,000
March 31, 2019	Seoul	South Korea	SK Olympic Handball Gymnasium	9,000
Total				N/A

=== Day6 Second Live Tour in Japan (2018) ===
Date	City	Country	Venue	Attendance
October 22, 2018	Miyagi	Japan	Darwin	—
October 24, 2018	Tokyo	Japan	Akasaka Blitz	—
October 25, 2018	Aichi	Japan	The Bottom Line	—
October 28, 2018	Fukuoka	Japan	Drum Be-1	—
October 29, 2018	Osaka	Japan	Namba Hatch	—

=== Day6 Second World Tour "Gravity" (2019–2020) ===
Date	City	Country	Venue	Attendance
August 9, 2019	Seoul	South Korea	Jamsil Indoor Stadium	15,000
August 10, 2019	Seoul	South Korea	Jamsil Indoor Stadium	15,000
August 11, 2019	Seoul	South Korea	Jamsil Indoor Stadium	15,000
August 24, 2019	Daegu	South Korea	EXCO Convention Hall	—
September 7, 2019	Busan	South Korea	KBS Hall Busan	—
September 8, 2019	Busan	South Korea	KBS Hall Busan	—
September 12, 2019	New York	United States	PlayStation Theater	—
September 13, 2019	New York	United States	PlayStation Theater	—
September 15, 2019	Boston	United States	Orpheum Theatre	—
September 18, 2019	Miami	United States	Fillmore Miami Beach	—
September 20, 2019	Dallas	United States	The Theatre at Grand Prairie	—
September 22, 2019	Chicago	United States	Rosemont Theatre	—
September 25, 2019	San Francisco	United States	Warfield Theatre	—
September 28, 2019	Los Angeles	United States	The Novo	—
September 29, 2019	Los Angeles	United States	The Novo	—
October 5, 2019	Singapore		The Star Performing Arts Centre	—
November 15, 2019	Melbourne	Australia	Festival Hall	—
November 17, 2019	Sydney	Australia	Enmore Theatre	—
November 23, 2019	Quezon City	Philippines	Smart Araneta Coliseum	—
November 30, 2019	Jakarta	Indonesia	Tennis Indoor Senayan	—
December 1, 2019	Jakarta	Indonesia	Tennis Indoor Senayan	—
December 7, 2019	Bangkok	Thailand	Thunder Dome	—
January 8, 2020	Milan	Italy	Fabrique Milano	—
January 10, 2020	Paris	France	Les Docks de Paris	—
January 12, 2020	London	England	O2 Brixton Academy	—
January 16, 2020	Amsterdam	Netherlands	The BOX	—
January 18, 2020	Berlin	Germany	Verti Music Hall	2,816
January 22, 2020	Brussels	Belgium	The Cirque Royal	—
January 24, 2020	Warsaw	Poland	Progresja	—
January 26, 2020	Moscow	Russia	Adrenaline Stadium	—
January 29, 2020	Lisbon	Portugal	Sala Tejo	—
January 31, 2020	Madrid	Spain	Palacio Vistalegre	—
Total				N/A

=== Day6 Third World Tour "Forever Young" (2024–2025) ===
Date	City	Country	Venue	Attendance
September 20, 2024	Incheon	South Korea	Inspire Arena	40,000
September 21, 2024	Incheon	South Korea	Inspire Arena	40,000
September 22, 2024	Incheon	South Korea	Inspire Arena	40,000
October 5, 2024	Kuala Lumpur	Malaysia	Mega Star Arena	—
October 6, 2024	Kuala Lumpur	Malaysia	Mega Star Arena	—
October 13, 2024	South Kuta	Indonesia	Bali Nusa Dua Convention Center	—
October 16, 2024	Surabaya	Indonesia	Jawa Pos Arena	—
October 19, 2024	Jakarta	Indonesia	Beach City International Stadium	—
October 20, 2024	Jakarta	Indonesia	Beach City International Stadium	—
November 22, 2024	Singapore		The Star Theatre	—
November 30, 2024	Bangkok	Thailand	UOB Live, Emsphere	—
December 1, 2024	Bangkok	Thailand	UOB Live, Emsphere	—
January 18, 2025	Kaohsiung	Taiwan	Kaohsiung Music Center	—
January 19, 2025	Kaohsiung	Taiwan	Kaohsiung Music Center	—
January 25, 2025	Hong Kong	China	AsiaWorld–Expo, Runway 11	—
January 26, 2025	Hong Kong	China	AsiaWorld–Expo, Runway 11	—
February 1, 2025	Busan	South Korea	BEXCO Exhibition Center 1	—
February 2, 2025	Busan	South Korea	BEXCO Exhibition Center 1	—
February 12, 2025	Osaka	Japan	Orix Theater	—
February 13, 2025	Osaka	Japan	Orix Theater	—
February 15, 2025	Tokyo	Japan	Makuhari Event Hall	—
February 16, 2025	Tokyo	Japan	Makuhari Event Hall	—
February 22, 2025	Quezon City	Philippines	Smart Araneta Coliseum	—
March 2, 2025	Daejeon	South Korea	Daejeon Convention Center	—
March 3, 2025	Daejeon	South Korea	Daejeon Convention Center	—
March 15, 2025	Gwangju	South Korea	Kwangju Women's University	—
March 16, 2025	Gwangju	South Korea	Kwangju Women's University	—
March 29, 2025	Daegu	South Korea	EXCO	—
March 30, 2025	Daegu	South Korea	EXCO	—
April 6, 2025	Sydney	Australia	Hordern Pavilion	—
April 7, 2025	Sydney	Australia	Hordern Pavilion	—
April 9, 2025	Melbourne	Australia	John Cain Arena	—
April 12, 2025	Auckland	New Zealand	Spark Arena	—
April 16, 2025	Los Angeles	United States	YouTube Theater	—
April 17, 2025	Los Angeles	United States	YouTube Theater	—
April 19, 2025	New York City	United States	The Theater at Madison Square Garden	—
April 26, 2025	Yokohama	Japan	Pia Arena MM	—
April 27, 2025	Yokohama	Japan	Pia Arena MM	—
May 3, 2025	Jakarta	Indonesia	Gelora Bung Karno Madya Stadium	—
May 9, 2025	Seoul	South Korea	KSPO Dome	96,000
May 10, 2025	Seoul	South Korea	KSPO Dome	96,000
May 11, 2025	Seoul	South Korea	KSPO Dome	96,000
May 16, 2025	Seoul	South Korea	KSPO Dome	96,000
May 17, 2025	Seoul	South Korea	KSPO Dome	96,000
May 18, 2025	Seoul	South Korea	KSPO Dome	96,000
Total				N/A

=== Day6 10th Anniversary Tour "The Decade" (2025–2026) ===
Date	City	Country	Venue	Attendance
August 30, 2025	Goyang	South Korea	Goyang Stadium	—
August 31, 2025	Goyang	South Korea	Goyang Stadium	—
September 27, 2025	Bangkok	Thailand	Impact Arena	—
October 18, 2025	Ho Chi Minh City	Vietnam	Saigon Exhibition and Convention Center	—
January 17, 2026	Hong Kong		AsiaWorld–Arena	—
January 18, 2026	Hong Kong		AsiaWorld–Arena	—
January 24, 2026	Manila	Philippines	SM Mall of Asia Arena	—
January 31, 2026	Kuala Lumpur	Malaysia	Axiata Arena	—
February 7, 2026	Daegu	South Korea	EXCO	—
February 8, 2026	Daegu	South Korea	EXCO	—
March 7, 2026	Taoyuan	Taiwan	NTSU Arena	—
March 8, 2026	Taoyuan	Taiwan	NTSU Arena	—
March 14, 2026	Gwangju	South Korea	Kimdaejung Convention Center	—
March 15, 2026	Gwangju	South Korea	Kimdaejung Convention Center	—
March 21, 2026	Daejeon	South Korea	Daejeon Convention Center	—
March 22, 2026	Daejeon	South Korea	Daejeon Convention Center	—
April 18, 2026	Singapore		Singapore Indoor Stadium	
April 25, 2026	Tokyo	Japan	Keio Arena Tokyo	—
April 26, 2026	Tokyo	Japan	Keio Arena Tokyo	—
May 9, 2026	Macau		Galaxy Arena	
May 16, 2026	Busan	South Korea	BEXCO Exhibition Center 1	—
May 17, 2026	Busan	South Korea	BEXCO Exhibition Center 1	—
June 20, 2026	Kobe	Japan	Glion Arena Kobe	—
June 21, 2026	Kobe	Japan	Glion Arena Kobe	—
Total				N/A

== Concerts ==
=== Live concerts ===
==== Day6 Live Concert "D-Day" (2015) ====
Date	City	Country	Venue	Attendance
November 20, 2015	Seoul	South Korea	Yes24 Muv Hall	—
November 21, 2015	Seoul	South Korea	Yes24 Muv Hall	—

==== Day6 Live Concert "Dream" (2016) ====
Date	City	Country	Venue	Attendance
May 28, 2016	Seoul	South Korea	Yes24 Live Hall	—
May 29, 2016	Seoul	South Korea	Yes24 Live Hall	—
August 20, 2016	Bangkok	Thailand	Thunder Dome	4,000
Total				

==== Day6 First Live in Japan "The Best Day" (2018) ====
Date	City	Country	Venue	Attendance
June 13, 2018	Tokyo	Japan	Tsutaya O-East	—
June 14, 2018	Osaka	Japan	Umeda Trad	—

=== Every Day6 Concerts (2017–2018) ===
Date	City	Country	Venue	Attendance
February 4, 2017	Seoul	South Korea	Yes24 Muv Hall	11,000
February 5, 2017	Seoul	South Korea	Yes24 Muv Hall	11,000
March 4, 2017	Seoul	South Korea	Yes24 Muv Hall	11,000
March 5, 2017	Seoul	South Korea	Yes24 Muv Hall	11,000
April 1, 2017	Seoul	South Korea	Yes24 Muv Hall	11,000
April 2, 2017	Seoul	South Korea	Yes24 Muv Hall	11,000
May 6, 2017	Seoul	South Korea	Yes24 Muv Hall	11,000
May 7, 2017	Seoul	South Korea	Yes24 Muv Hall	11,000
June 3, 2017	Seoul	South Korea	Yes24 Muv Hall	11,000
June 4, 2017	Seoul	South Korea	Yes24 Muv Hall	11,000
July 29, 2017	Seoul	South Korea	Yes24 Live Hall	2,700
July 30, 2017	Seoul	South Korea	Yes24 Live Hall	2,700
September 1, 2017	Seoul	South Korea	KT&G Sangsang Madang	—
September 2, 2017	Seoul	South Korea	KT&G Sangsang Madang	—
September 3, 2017	Seoul	South Korea	KT&G Sangsang Madang	—
September 29, 2017	Seoul	South Korea	Yonsei University's The Centennial Hall	2,400
September 30, 2017	Seoul	South Korea	Yonsei University's The Centennial Hall	2,400
October 1, 2017	Seoul	South Korea	Yonsei University's The Centennial Hall	2,400
November 3, 2017	Seoul	South Korea	KT&G Sangsang Madang	—
November 4, 2017	Seoul	South Korea	KT&G Sangsang Madang	—
December 22, 2017	Seoul	South Korea	Yes24 Live Hall	8,000
December 23, 2017	Seoul	South Korea	Yes24 Live Hall	8,000
December 24, 2017	Seoul	South Korea	Yes24 Live Hall	8,000
December 25, 2017	Seoul	South Korea	Yes24 Live Hall	8,000
January 21, 2018	Busan	South Korea	Sohyang Theater	—
January 22, 2018	Busan	South Korea	Sohyang Theater	—
January 27, 2018	Daegu	South Korea	Suseong Art Pia	—
February 10, 2018	Daejeon	South Korea	Woosong Art Theater	—
Total				

==== Every Day6 Finale Concert "The Best Moments" (2018) ====
Date	City	Country	Venue	Attendance
March 3, 2018	Seoul	South Korea	Olympic Hall	6,000
March 4, 2018	Seoul	South Korea	Olympic Hall	6,000

=== Day6 Welcome To The Show (2024) ===
Date	City	Country	Venue	Attendance
April 12, 2024	Seoul	South Korea	Jamsil Indoor Stadium	34,000
April 13, 2024	Seoul	South Korea	Jamsil Indoor Stadium	34,000
April 14, 2024	Seoul	South Korea	Jamsil Indoor Stadium	34,000

=== Day6 Christmas Special Concert "The Present" (2018–2019, 2023–present) ===
==== Day6 Christmas Special Concert "The Present" (2018) ====
Date	City	Country	Venue	Attendance
December 22, 2018	Seoul	South Korea	Blue Square iMarket Hall	7,000
December 23, 2018	Seoul	South Korea	Blue Square iMarket Hall	7,000
December 24, 2018	Seoul	South Korea	Blue Square iMarket Hall	7,000

==== Day6 Christmas Special Concert "The Present" (2019) ====
Date	City	Country	Venue	Attendance
December 20, 2019	Seoul	South Korea	Olympic Hall	—
December 21, 2019	Seoul	South Korea	Olympic Hall	—
December 22, 2019	Seoul	South Korea	Olympic Hall	—
December 24, 2019	Seoul	South Korea	Olympic Hall	—

==== Day6 Christmas Special Concert "The Present: You Are My Day" (2023) ====
Date	City	Country	Venue	Attendance
December 22, 2023	Seoul	South Korea	Korea University Hwajeong Tiger Dome	—
December 23, 2023	Seoul	South Korea	Korea University Hwajeong Tiger Dome	—
December 24, 2023	Seoul	South Korea	Korea University Hwajeong Tiger Dome	—

==== Day6 Christmas Special Concert "The Present" (2024) ====
Date	City	Country	Venue	Attendance
December 20, 2024	Seoul	South Korea	Gocheok Sky Dome	38,000
December 21, 2024	Seoul	South Korea	Gocheok Sky Dome	38,000

==== Day6 Special Concert "The Present" (2025) ====
Date	City	Country	Venue	Attendance
December 19, 2025	Seoul	South Korea	KSPO Dome	96,000
December 20, 2025	Seoul	South Korea	KSPO Dome	96,000
December 21, 2025	Seoul	South Korea	KSPO Dome	96,000

== Showcases ==
Date	City	Country	Venue	Attendance
October 18, 2015	Taipei	Taiwan	Att Showbox	1,000

== Fan Meetings ==
=== Day6 First Fan Meeting in Singapore ===
Date	City	Country	Venue	Attendance
December 5, 2015	Singapore		Marina Bay Sands Convention Centre	—

=== Day6 Fan Meeting in Singapore "Daydream" ===
Date	City	Country	Venue	Attendance
December 10, 2016	Singapore		Megabox Convention Centre	—

=== Day6 First Fan Meeting "You Made My Day" ===
Date	City	Country	Venue	Attendance
September 8, 2018	Seoul	South Korea	Korea University Hwajung Gymnasium	5,000

=== Day6 Second Fan Meeting "You Made My Day" Ep.2 [Scentographer] ===
Date	City	Country	Venue	Attendance
June 29, 2019	Seoul	South Korea	Jamsil Arena	5,500

=== Day6 Third Fan Meeting "I Need My Day" ===
Date	City	Country	Venue	Attendance
June 21, 2024	Seoul	South Korea	Jamsil Indoor Stadium	—
June 22, 2024	Seoul	South Korea	Jamsil Indoor Stadium	—
June 23, 2024	Seoul	South Korea	Jamsil Indoor Stadium	—

=== Day6 Fourth Fan Meeting "Pier 10: All My Days" ===
Date	City	Country	Venue	Attendance
July 18, 2025	Seoul	South Korea	Jamsil Indoor Stadium	—
July 19, 2025	Seoul	South Korea	Jamsil Indoor Stadium	—
July 20, 2025	Seoul	South Korea	Jamsil Indoor Stadium	—
July 25, 2025	Seoul	South Korea	Jamsil Indoor Stadium	—
July 26, 2025	Seoul	South Korea	Jamsil Indoor Stadium	—
July 27, 2025	Seoul	South Korea	Jamsil Indoor Stadium	—

Day6 Fifth Fan Meeting "Every Day6, every MyDay"

Date	City	Country	Venue	Attendance
October 23, 2026	Incheon	South Korea	Inspire Arena	—
October 24, 2026	Incheon	South Korea	Inspire Arena	—
October 25, 2026	Incheon	South Korea	Inspire Arena	—

=== Live & Meets ===
Date	City	Country	Venue	Attendance
December 12, 2015	Bangkok	Thailand	GMM Live House	2,500
July 21, 2017	Taipei	Taiwan	Att Showbox	1,100
August 13, 2017	Bangkok	Thailand	GMM Live House	2,000
August 26, 2017	Jakarta	Indonesia	Balai Sarbini	1,300
October 20, 2017	Los Angeles	United States	Mirada Theatre	—
October 22, 2017	Austin	United States	Emo's	—
October 24, 2017	New York	United States	The Town Hall	1,400
October 27, 2017	Detroit	United States	Music Hall Center for the Performing Arts	—
October 29, 2017	Toronto	Canada	John Bassett Theatre	—
Total				
