= Level Up Project! =

- The logo of the show
- Genre: Reality show
- Starring: Red Velvet
- Opening theme: "Mojito" (Season 1); "Look" (Season 2); "Hit That Drum" (Season 3); "Jelly" & "Naughty" (Season 4); "Feel My Rhythm" (Season 5); "Hula Hoop" (Season 6)
- Country of origin: South Korea
- Original language: Korean
- No. of seasons: 6
- No. of episodes: 151

Production
- Production location: South Korea
- Camera setup: Multi-camera
- Production company: SM Culture & Contents

Original release
- Network: Oksusu; KBS Joy; True ID; XtvN; JTBC4; Wavve

Level Up Project! (Korean: 레벨 업 프로젝트!) is a series of Korean variety show featuring South Korean girl group Red Velvet. Currently, it spans over six different seasons, with the latest season premiering in August 2026.

== Synopsis ==
Members visit different parts of the world in-between promotions. The first season takes place in Pattaya, Thailand, the second in Yeosu and the third in Slovenia. The fourth season, entitled Level Up Thrilling Project, takes place in Seoul. The fifth season takes place in Jeju.

== Cast ==
- First season: Irene, Seulgi, Wendy and Yeri (Note: Joy didn't appear in this season due to her schedule for drama The Liar and His Lover.)
- Second season: Irene, Seulgi, Wendy, Joy and Yeri
- Third season: Irene, Seulgi, Wendy, Joy and Yeri
- Fourth season: Irene and Seulgi, with Joy as a special guest.
- Fifth season: Irene, Seulgi, Wendy, Joy and Yeri
- Sixth season: Irene, Seulgi, Wendy, Joy and Yeri

== Series overview ==
Season	Episodes	Originally released	
Season	Episodes	First released	Last released
1	23	July 27, 2017	September 10, 2017
2	60	January 8, 2018	March 17, 2018
3	40	August 13, 2018	October 5, 2018
4	16	July 8, 2020	August 12, 2020
5	12	September 23, 2022	October 28, 2022
6	3	August 14, 2026	August 28, 2026

== Broadcasting platforms ==
=== Korea ===
- Oksusu (Season 1-3)
- KBS Joy (Season 1)
- XtvN (Season 2)
- JTBC4 (Season 3)
- Wavve (Seasons 4-6)
- SM C&C Youtube (Season 4)
- Mnet (Season 6)

=== Thailand ===
- True ID
