= SJ Returns =

Korean reality TV show

- SJ Returns Season 4
- Genre: Reality Show
- Written by: Hwang Seon-yeong; Kim Hui-eun; Kim Gyeong-mi; Baek Ju-yeon; Sin Ye-seul; Sin Won-gyeom; Hwang Yeong-a
- Directed by: Cheon Myeong-hyeon
- Creative director: Lee Ye-ji
- Starring: Super Junior
- Opening theme: "It's You" by Super Junior; "Superman" by Super Junior
- Country of origin: South Korea
- Original language: Korean
- No. of seasons: 4
- No. of episodes: Season 1: 60; Season 2: 46; Season 3: 54; Season 4: 108

Production
- Producers: Kim Ji-seon; Kim Su-hyeon; Hwang Yun-chan; Song Yu-ri; Bang Mi-ri; Lee Won-yeong; Jo Jeong-yeong; Jeong Su-a
- Production location: South Korea
- Production company: S.M. Culture & Contents

Original release
- Network: Naver TV; V Live; JTBC2
- Release: October 9, 2017 – 2021

SJ Returns (Korean: 슈주 리턴즈; RR: Syuju riteonjeu) is a Korean reality show of Super Junior that showcases their lives and shows the charms of each member, that aired on Naver TV and V Live. The show was first aired in 2017.

== Plot ==
This show will follow Super Junior's everyday life. In season 1 the show showcased their comeback story for their 8th album after 2 years of hiatus as a group. The show was put to an end after the release of their comeback album. Season 1 was aired from October 9, 2017 to November 24, 2017, every Monday to Friday at 11:00 AM KST and on JTBC2 from December 6, 2017 at 9:00 p.m. KST.

On 26 October 2018, Label SJ announced that the show would be back with Season 2. During the second season of the show, the group had a totally different theme from the last season and showed refreshing new charms of the members where they showed the best food around Tokyo. Season 2 was released on November 5 to December 26, 2018.

In 2019 Label SJ announced that they would be launching "SJ Returns 3," which followed the members on their individual activities, as well as their preparations for their new album that will be released on the same year. At noon KST on August 26, Super Junior released an introductory video to "SJ Returns 3" and explained, "Super Junior's individual hiatuses due to the army, which lasted 10 years in total, are finally over. Please tune in to see the nine members of Super Junior who are back from the army prepare for our ninth album." Season 3 aired on September 9 to October 20, 2019.

In 2020, Super Junior's Yesung and Donghae posted a picture which stated that the group was filming SJ Returns Season 4 and that it would air soon. Leeteuk also stated on the same day on his YouTube live stream that SJ Returns Season 4 will be back and planned to air in May, The teaser for Season 4 was aired on April 27, 2020, and its first episode was released on May 2, 2020. In their second teaser, the members tell the concept for SJ Returns 4 will be 'for ELF', where the show will fulfill the requests from fans. They also mentioned that this season will be a lengthy program.

== Cast ==
The show's cast is made up of Super Junior members.

Name
Name	Season 1	Season 2	Season 3	Season 4
Main
Leeteuk	Main			
Heechul	Main			Guest
Yesung	Main		Main	
Shindong	Main			
Eunhyuk	Main			
Donghae	Main			
Siwon	Main			
Ryeowook		Guest	Main	
Kyuhyun	Guest		Main	

== List of Episodes ==
=== Season 1 ===
List of episodes in Season 1 (episodes 1–60)

Episode	Date	Title
1	October 9, 2017	"Salute! Eunhyuk's Return" (충성! 은혁의 귀환)
2	October 9, 2017	"Eunhyuk's Variety Comeback After 2 Years" (은혁, 2년만에 예능 컴백!)
3	October 10, 2017	"Lunch to Celebrate Eunhyuk's Return" (전역 기념 점심식사)
4	October 10, 2017	"The Road SJ Must Go On…" (슈퍼 주니어가 나아갈 길...)
5	October 11, 2017	"SJ's Selfie Methods at SMTOWN in TOKYO" (SMTOWN in TOKYO 슈주식 셀카법)
6	October 11, 2017	"First Meeting for SJ's New Album" (슈퍼주니어 새 앨범 첫 회의)
7	October 12, 2017	"The Meeting Goes off Topic…" (회의는 점점 산으로...)
8	October 12, 2017	"Looking at SJ's Album History" (슈퍼주니어 역대 앨범 훑어보기)
9	October 13, 2017	"SJ's Records for Music Show Wins" (슈퍼주니어 역대 음원 성적 공개)
10	October 13, 2017	"Yesung's Untold Story" (예성의 못다 한 이야기)
11	October 16, 2017	"Most liked SJ member" (슈퍼주니어 호감도 순위)
12	October 16, 2017	"Most Well-known SJ Member and Expected Result of New Album" (슈퍼주니어 인지도 순위& 새 앨범 예상 성적)
13	October 17, 2017	"Establishing SJ Rules 1" (슈주만의 규칙 정하기1)
14	October 17, 2017	"Establishing SJ Rules 2" (슈주만의 규칙 정하기2)
15	October 18, 2017	"Picking SJ's Positions" (슈퍼주니어 자리 정하기)
16	October 18, 2017	"Investigating SJ's SNS Pages" (슈퍼주니어 SNS 자체 검열)
17	October 19, 2017	"First Meeting to Discuss the Title Track 1" (첫 번째 타이틀곡 회의1)
18	October 19, 2017	"First Meeting to Discuss the Title Track 2" (첫 번째 타이틀곡 회의2)
19	October 20, 2017	"First Recording for the New Album 1" (새 앨범 첫 번째 녹음1)
20	October 20, 2017	"First Recording for the New Album 2" (새 앨범 첫 번째 녹음2)
21	October 23, 2017	"First Recording for the New Album 3" (새 앨범 첫 번째 녹음3)
22	October 23, 2017	"Making Kim Heechul Pretty Project" (김희철 예뻐지기 프로젝트)
23	October 24, 2017	"Second Meeting to Discuss the Title Track 1" (두 번째 타이틀곡 회의1)
24	October 24, 2017	"Second Meeting to Discuss the Title Track 2" (두 번째 타이틀곡 회의2)
25	October 25, 2017	"Release of Super Junior's 8th Album Title Track" (슈퍼주니어 8집 타이틀곡 공개)
26	October 25, 2017	"[One More Chance] Recording Day Part 1" ([비처럼 가지 마요] 녹음1)
27	October 26, 2017	"[One More Chance] Recording Day Part 2" ([비처럼 가지 마요] 녹음2)
28	October 26, 2017	"[One More Chance] Recording Day Part 3" ([비처럼 가지 마요] 녹음3)
29	October 27, 2017	"[One More Chance] Recording Day Part 4" ([비처럼 가지 마요] 녹음4)
30	October 27, 2017	"[One More Chance] Recording Day Part 5" ([비처럼 가지 마요] 녹음5)
31	October 30, 2017	"[Black Suit] Getting Ready 1" ([Black Suit] 본격 준비1)
32	October 30, 2017	"[Black Suit] Getting Ready 2_Dance Practice" ([Black Suit] 본격 준비2_ 안무연습)
33	October 31, 2017	"[Black Suit] Getting Ready 3_Heechul's Concern and Efforts" ([Black Suit] 본격 준비3_희철의 고민과 노력)
34	October 31, 2017	"The First Day of the Jacket Album Shoot 1" (새 앨범 재킷 촬영 첫째 날1)
35	November 1, 2017	"The First Day of the Jacket Album Shoot 2" (새 앨범 재킷 촬영 첫째 날2)
36	November 1, 2017	"The Second Day of the Jacket Album Shoot" (새 앨범 재킷 촬영 둘째 날)
37	November 2, 2017	"[Black Suit] Music Video Shoot 1" ([Black Suit] 뮤직비디오 촬영1)
38	November 2, 2017	"[Black Suit] Music Video Shoot 2" ([Black Suit] 뮤직비디오 촬영2)
39	November 3, 2017	"[Black Suit] Music Video Shoot 3" ([Black Suit] 뮤직비디오 촬영3)
40	November 3, 2017	"[Black Suit] Music Video Shoot 4" ([Black Suit] 뮤직비디오 촬영4)
41	November 6, 2017	"Making Kim Heechul Pretty Project 2" (김희철 예뻐지기 프로젝트2)
42	November 6, 2017	"Super Junior Goes to Sports Day Part 1" (슈퍼주니어 단합대회 가는 길1)
43	November 7, 2017	"Super Junior Goes to Sports Day Part 2" (슈퍼주니어 단합대회 가는 길2)
44	November 7, 2017	"Super Junior Goes to Sports Day Part 3" (슈퍼주니어 단합대회 가는 길3)
45	November 7, 2017	"Super Junior Goes to Sports Day Part 4" (슈퍼주니어 단합대회 가는 길4)
46	November 7, 2017	"Super Junior Goes to Sports Day Part 5" (슈퍼주니어 단합대회 가는 길5)
47	November 8, 2017	"Super Junior's Sports Day: Water Sports Part 1" (슈주 단합대회: 수상레저1)
48	November 8, 2017	"Super Junior's Sports Day: Water Sports Part 2" (슈주 단합대회: 수상레저2)
49	November 9, 2017	"Super Junior's Sports Day: Water Sports Part 3" (슈주 단합대회: 수상레저3)
50	November 9, 2017	"Super Junior's Sports Day: Water Sports Part 4" (슈주 단합대회: 수상레저4)
51	November 13, 2017	"Super Junior's Sports Day: Escape the Restaurant Game Part 1" (슈주 단합대회: 식당 탈출 게임1)
52	November 13, 2017	"Super Junior's Sports Day: Escape the Restaurant Game Part 2" (슈주 단합대회: 식당 탈출 게임2)
53	November 14, 2017	"Super Junior's Sports Day: Escape the Restaurant Game Part 3" (슈주 단합대회: 식당 탈출 게임3)
54	November 14, 2017	"Super Junior's Sports Day: Escape the Restaurant Game Part 4" (슈주 단합대회: 식당 탈출 게임4)
55	November 15, 2017	"Super Junior's Sports Day: Escape the Restaurant Game Part 5" (슈주 단합대회: 식당 탈출 게임5)
56	November 15, 2017	"Super Junior's Sports Day: Escape the Restaurant Game Part 6" (슈주 단합대회: 식당 탈출 게임6)
57	November 16, 2017	"Super Junior's Sports Day: Escape the Restaurant Game Part 7" (슈주 단합대회: 식당 탈출 게임7)
58	November 16, 2017	"Super Junior's Sports Day: Escape the Restaurant Game Part 8" (슈주 단합대회: 식당 탈출 게임8)
59	November 17, 2017	"Super Junior's Sports Day: Bedtime" (슈주 단합대회: 취침시간)
60	November 17, 2017	"120 Days Spent with Super Junior" (슈퍼주니어와 함께한 120일간의 여정)
Behind 01	November 20, 2017	"Super Junior's Tardiness" (슈퍼주니어의 지각)
Behind 02	November 21, 2017	"Super Junior's Baits" (슈퍼주니어의 떡밥)
Behind 03	November 22, 2017	"D&E's LA Self-Cam" (D&E LA 셀프카메라)
Behind 04	November 23, 2017	"What Happened During Dance Practice" (슈퍼주니어 안무연습 중 벌어진 일)
Behind 05	November 24, 2017	"The MV Set of the [One More Chance]" ([비처럼 가지 마요] MV 촬영 현장)
Vlive+ Special	January 15, 2018	"SJ returns PLAY the unreleased video clips!" ([슈주 리턴즈 미공개 영상 PLAY)

=== Season 2 ===
List of episodes in Season 2 (episodes 1-46)

Episode	Date	Title
1	November 5, 2018	엘프를 위한 슈주의 '食'프로젝트
2	November 5, 2018	이특, 희철, 신동의 도쿄 릴레이 미식 투어!
3	November 5, 2018	D&E 공연장 근처 맛집을 찾아서~
4	November 7, 2018	D&E 공연장 근처 희철's Pick 식당은?
5	November 7, 2018	특요비와 제육신동의 입맛을 저격하라!
6	November 7, 2018	희철 추천 엘프의 밥상 평가
7	November 12, 2018	요리프로그램 MC 특요비가 추천한 두 번째 엘프의 밥상
8	November 12, 2018	일본 직장인들이 줄을 서서 먹는다는 오코노미야키의 맛
9	November 12, 2018	조리장 특선메뉴의 정체는? 멤버들의 혹독한(?) 밥상 평가 시간!
10	November 14, 2018	쇼핑 독박(?) 라임 배틀 '00씨는 우리와 함께 쇼핑을 못하게 되었습니다'
11	November 14, 2018	쇼핑 타임도 분량 확보 이상무! 희철의 돌+I 모자SHOW!
12	November 14, 2018	희철,신동을 감동시킨 특요비 추천 초밥집의 대반전 맛!
13	November 18, 2018	'이 초밥 200개도 먹을 수 있을 것 같아!' 도쿄에서 만난 슈주 인생 초밥'
14	November 18, 2018	갑분싸 초밥의 등장! 특요비의 밥상 이대로 위기?
15	November 21, 2018	고기 마니아 신동이 추천하는 시선 강탈! 육즙 폭발! 야키니쿠 전문점
16	November 21, 2018	이래서 순서가 중요해... 형 나 오늘 생일이라고!!!(ㅜㅜ)
17	November 26, 2018	먹방의 끝을 잡고~♪ 졸린 이특 번쩍 깨울 희철's Pick 식당은?!
18	November 26, 2018	엘프의밥상 별점 최고점 경신?! 모두를 놀라게 한 특별메뉴는 과연?
19	November 26, 2018	드디어 만난 D&E! 형들이 준비한 엘프의 밥상 입도 안 대고 엎어버리다!
20	November 28, 2018	"쟤네 입맛 왜 저래!!" 첫 번째 밥상부터 D&E 입맛 저격 실패 위기!??
21	November 28, 2018	안 먹어도 돼요?" 위기의 밥상! 꼴찌 유력 후보로 급부상한 멤버는?
22	November 28, 2018	1등이 안되면 꼴찌만 면하자! 피 터지는 2등 싸움의 전말은?
23	November 28, 2018	드디어 D&E의 최종 선택! 엘프에게 강력 추천할 도쿄 최고의 밥상은?
24	December 3, 2018	D&E 나고야 투어 대기실 모습 대공개!
25	December 3, 2018	신동, 시원, 려욱의 나고야 릴레이 미식 여행!
26	December 3, 2018	슈퍼주니어 다시 우(리)동(거했어요) 각?
27	December 5, 2018	이런 곳에 식당이 있다고?? 지하상가에 위치한 시크릿 맛집을 찾아서!
28	December 5, 2018	커피부터 평범하지 않은 나고야만의 특별한 맛!
29	December 5, 2018	"신동 형~ 2점! 2.5점! 아니 3.5점!!!" 별점이 끝없이 올라간 사연은?
30	December 10, 2018	마시 만나러 가는 길(feat. 려욱의 시원 뒷담화?)
31	December 10, 2018	이 정도면 먹방BJ? 오늘은 모든 걸 내려놓는 날!
32	December 10, 2018	헉!! 이게 한 입에 가능해? 아홉가지 재료를 담은 세 번째 메뉴의 정체는?
33	December 10, 2018	"너무 맛있다~" 하지만 1.5점?? 낮은 점수를 받은 시원의 밥상, 그 이유는?
34	December 12, 2018	돌아온 라임게임! 힙합 맥커터 이트~ ~ ~ㄱ의 뒤를 이을 힙합 신생아는?
35	December 12, 2018	려우기의 장어덮밥 더 맛있게 즐기는 법! 엘프들~ 날 따라 해보세요^^
36	December 12, 2018	이건 무조건 1등! 나고야 엘프의 밥상 최고점 기록?
37	December 17, 2018	려우기의 돈가스 맛있게 먹는 법 대공개!!! 모두 다 따라해보아요~^^
38	December 17, 2018	신동 코 평수 리얼 확장?! 안 먹으면 후회할 돈가스 점수는 과연?
39	December 17, 2018	인증샷 필수 GOLD 아이스크림과 함께하는! 보기드문 쓰리샷의 절친 노트
40	December 19, 2018	시원이 추천하는 마지막 메뉴 닭 날개 튀김! 슈주표 닭 날개 발골 쑈쑈쑈
41	December 19, 2018	멤버들이 뽑은 나고야 최고의 밥상은? 비나이다 꼴찌만 면하게 해주세요
42	December 24, 2018	★축★ 동해 깜짝 생파! 드디어 합체한 나고야 멤버와 D&E! 제 점수는요?
43	December 24, 2018	신동,시원,려욱 중 하나는 물따귀! 운명을 결정지을 D&E's Pick 밥상은?
44	December 26, 2018	물따귀 맞을 사람이 3명?! 멤버들 입 떡 벌어진 반전 드라마의 전말은?
45	December 26, 2018	우열을 가릴 수 없는 바보들의 대행진! 이제 진짜 물따귀 맞으실게요~
46	December 26, 2018	"주먹으로 때린 거 아니지?!" 충격의 벌칙! 그리고 슈주가 엘프에게~♥
Behind Clip	January 22, 2019	김희철 슈주 리턴즈2 습격 사건!
Vlive+ Special	January 23, 2019	E.L.F. 한정 공개! '슈주'스러운 소확행 가득~ 그들만의 브이로그!

=== Season 3 ===
List of episodes in Season 3 (episodes 1–54)

Episode	Date	Title
1	September 9, 2019	9집 컴백을 앞두고 모인 슈퍼주니어
2	September 9, 2019	D&E, 아시아 투어 비하인드
3	September 9, 2019	만능 재주꾼 신동 & 국민배우 시원 드라마 촬영장
4	September 11, 2019	예능대세, 광고계 블루칩 희철 & 화보까지 섭렵한 글로벌 MC 이특
5	September 11, 2019	명품 보이스로 뮤지컬&예능 섭렵한 려욱_1
6	September 11, 2019	명품 보이스로 뮤지컬&예능 섭렵한 려욱_2
7	September 13, 2019	2년 만에 솔로앨범으로 컴백한 예성
8	September 13, 2019	방송가 러브콜 폭발! 규현의 다양한 스케줄
9	September 16, 2019	오랜만에 모인 #산만주니어
10	September 16, 2019	"999 프로젝트의 서막" [9가지 덕목 지키기] 1. 체력
11	September 16, 2019	[9가지 덕목] 2. 열정 3. 사랑 4. 끈기
12	September 18, 2019	[9가지 덕목] 5. 지성 6. 초심 7. 눈치
13	September 18, 2019	[9가지 덕목] 8. 감사
14	September 18, 2019	[9가지 덕목] 8. 감사 9. 준법
15	September 20, 2019	회식비 몰아주기 실시간 투표
16	September 20, 2019	신이시여~ 저만 안 걸리게 해주세요
17	September 20, 2019	회식비 몰아주기 그 영광의 주인공은 누구?
18	September 23, 2019	언제나처럼 산으로 가는 산만주니어
19	September 23, 2019	슈주가 직접 슈주 매니저를 한다면?!
20	September 23, 2019	이특의 연락두절?! 멘붕에 빠진 신동희매니저
21	September 25, 2019	만능 매니저 신동희의 마성의 커피 제조법 대공개?!
22	September 25, 2019	짠돌이 이특, 오늘부로 기부천사 되다!??
23	September 25, 2019	신동, '연예인보단 매니저가 더 쉬웠어요~'
24	September 27, 2019	의욕은 만점 실력은 빵점 매니저 이혁재?!
25	September 27, 2019	초보 매니저 이혁재의 대형사고! 시작도 전에 해고 위기!??
26	September 27, 2019	짜여진 각본같은 이혁재 매니저의 실수 연발... 급기야 녹화 중단?!
27	September 30, 2019	혁재 매니저의 대환장 쇼핑(feat. 신동법카)
28	September 30, 2019	믿기지 않는 불운의 연속!? 2차 녹화 중단 사태 발발!
29	September 30, 2019	21세기 최악의 매니저의 결말은?
30	October 2, 2019	아티스트보다 바쁜 마이웨이 슈스 매니저의 등장
31	October 2, 2019	알고 보니 까칠한(?) 아티스트 은혁
32	October 2, 2019	낯익은 불청객의 등장? '누구세요?'
33	October 4, 2019	규매니저에게 주어진 미션! 과연 성공 할 수 있을
34	October 4, 2019	'내 연예인은 내가 지킨다' 규매니저의 과잉 보호 논란?!
35	October 4, 2019	슈주 멤버들이 뽑은 최고의 매니저 최악의 매니저는 과연?
36	October 7, 2019	!!실제상황!! 멤버들도 처음 듣는 9집 타이틀 곡 선정회의
37	October 7, 2019	첫 번째 타이틀 곡 후보 곡 [I Think I] 녹음
38	October 7, 2019	두 번째 타이틀 후보 곡 [Fire(가제)]녹음
39	October 9, 2019	타이틀 곡 결정을 앞두고 생긴 갑작스런 변수?!
40	October 9, 2019	슈퍼주니어 멤버들 전원 긴급 소환!
41	October 9, 2019	장관이네요 절경이고요 신이 주신 비주얼입니다
42	October 11, 2019	감자팔이 소년과 바느질 장인이 슈주 대기실에 출몰했다?!
43	October 11, 2019	뛰는 슈주 위 나는 매니저, 슈주 매니저의 비글돌 슈주 조련법
44	October 11, 2019	원조 MC 자리를 위협하는 도플갱어 MC의 등장!
45	October 14, 2019	타이틀곡 안무 첫 연습 그리고 희철의 이야기
46	October 14, 2019	마! 이게 바로 15년 차 안무 습득력이다!
47	October 14, 2019	이럴 수가! 내가 센터 댄규?
48	October 18, 2019	[SUPER Clap] 뮤직비디오 촬영1
49	October 18, 2019	[SUPER Clap] 뮤직비디오 촬영2
50	October 18, 2019	[SUPER Clap] 뮤직비디오 촬영3
51	October 20, 2019	[슈퍼쇼8] 어디서도 공개된 적 없는 백스테이지 공개
52	October 20, 2019	[슈퍼쇼8] 9집 수록곡 무대 최초 공개! & 예성의 특별한 선물
53	October 20, 2019	새로운 시작과 또 하나의 추억 with E.L.F.
54	October 20, 2019	'Somebody New' 스페셜 비디오 비하인드

=== Season 4 ===
List of episodes in Season 4 (episodes 1–108)

Episode	Date	Title
1	May 18, 2020	산만주니어의 귀환! 돌아온 "슈주 시계"
2	May 20, 2020	근황 토크를 빙자한 슈주의 T.M.I 방출
3	May 22, 2020	동생들 깐족에 바람 잘 날 없는 예톰의 하루
4	May 25, 2020	16년 함께한 멤버들도 이특의 [이것]을 모른다!?
5	May 27, 2020	라이어만 6명? <라이어 게임 1R>
6	May 29, 2020	라이어의 정체는 바로~ ~ ~! (소름 주의)
7	June 2, 2020	워밍업 끝! 본 게임은 지금부터 <라이어 게임 2R>
8	June 3, 2020	복수 3부작으로 게임 정체성 붕괴 직전..?!
9	June 5, 2020	정신과 의사가 분석하는 슈주家 아홉 멤버! <슈주 심리 분석>
Special Edition: K.R.Y. Returns	June 7, 2020	1st STORY - K.R.Y. 앨범 제작기 EP01
Special Edition: K.R.Y. Returns	June 8, 2020	1st STORY - K.R.Y. 앨범 제작기 EP02
10	June 8, 2020	충격 속보! "슈주家엔 객식구가 살고 있다?!"
11	June 10, 2020	(싱크로율 1106%) 멤버 복사기 슈주의 대환장(?) <역할 바꾸기>
12	June 12, 2020	2020 <슈주 리턴즈4 : 더 비기닝> 자 이제 최선 2YAO~
13	June 22, 2020	시즌1보다 강렬하다! 돌아온 우동 시즌2 짝꿍 공개
14	June 24, 2020	돌.우.동. 미션과 함께 밝혀지는 '깍두기(?) 은혁'의 정체!
15	June 26, 2020	분량을 사수하라! 빈대(?) 은혁의 슬기로운 방송생활
16	June 29, 2020	'특♥해'의 추억 속으로 (feat. 15살 동해 & 18살 이특)
17	July 1, 2020	16년째이지만 초면(?)입니다~ 따로 또 같이 먹는 점심식사
18	July 3, 2020	시즌1보다 업그레이드된 '돌아온 우동 하우스' 입성!
19	July 6, 2020	희귀 조각상 출몰의 현장(?)! 어디서도 볼 수 없는 희귀한 방 쟁탈전
20	July 8, 2020	몸개그란 이런 것! 예능 신들의 치열한 방 배정 매치 (feat. 포토존)
21	July 10, 2020	개성 뚜렷! 각 커플들의 오붓한(?) 둘만의 규칙 정하기
22	July 13, 2020	슈주의 숨어있던 레이서 세포가 깨어났다! 본투비 레이서는 누구?
23	July 15, 2020	한눈 팔 틈이 없다! 눈 깜짝할 새에 끝나버린 초스피드 경기
24	July 17, 2020	슈주식 훈훈한 마무리♥︎ 돌.우.동 커플들의 찐우정 속마음 토크
25	July 20, 2020	드디어 그가 온다! 슈주 옆집 동네 날라리(?)의 <슈주 리턴즈4> 첫 등장!
26	July 22, 2020	신동 하우스 가는 길! 이동 중에도 산만한 슈주의 "우린 언제 철들까?"
27	July 24, 2020	산만주니어의 스마트한 신동 집 뽀개기(?)
28	July 27, 2020	집들이 선물 대방출, 갖고 싶으면 맞혀보시든가~
29	July 29, 2020	촉이 촉이 촉이와~ 촉으로 때려 맞히는 동도사의 집들이 선물 개봉기
30	July 31, 2020	신동 집들이에서 다시 만난 그 게임! <라이어 게임 1R>
31	August 3, 2020	거친 생각과 불안한 눈빛의 라이어 빌런과 그걸 지켜보는 시민들!
32	August 5, 2020	소통을 포기한 호통, 남는 건 고막 고통?! 슞망진창 <고요 속의 외침>
33	August 7, 2020	Hoxy..보일러 회사 직원이세요? 기상천외한 설명 속 <고요 속의 외침 2탄>
34	August 10, 2020	예상치 못한 뉴빌런(?)의 등장! 카오스 중심의 <라이어 게임 2탄>
35	August 12, 2020	집바로(?)~ 나가버리고~ 호다닥 칼퇴전쟁 "신동 집 대탈출"!
36	August 14, 2020	어차피 엔딩요정은 OO? 웬일인지 낯설지가 않아요~♪
37	August 17, 2020	푸르른 기운 가득한 이곳은?! 슈주판 전원 일기 개봉박두
38	August 19, 2020	막내 라인 규추X려추 결성?! 이들이 개명을 불사한 사연은..?
39	August 21, 2020	프로 지각러 부캐 덕에(?) 슈주 메인 댄서 본캐 등판!
40	August 24, 2020	호미 Beat 깔아주세요~ 은시해의 농번기 RAP 음원 공개.mp3
41	August 26, 2020	신나게 줄 DANGER DANGER! 찐 만능인의 지휘 아래 순항하는 고추밭호
42	August 28, 2020	노동요 ON! 농사하다 말고 펼쳐진 안성~ 노래자랑!
43	August 31, 2020	옥수수 슈벤져스 합체 완료! 그러나 그들을 기다리는...운명의 제비뽑기
Special Edition: D&E Returns	September 1, 2020	D&E 컴백 송캠프 EP01
Special Edition: D&E Returns	September 1, 2020	D&E 컴백 송캠프 EP02
44	September 2, 2020	사상 초유의 토크 실종 사태..?! 옥수수밭 STAGE2 모종 심기
Special Edition: D&E Returns	September 3, 2020	D&E 컴백 리얼 제작기 EP01
45	September 4, 2020	고생 후 꿀맛 같은 새참 시간~ 그리고... 상상도 못 한 OO OOO의 귀환!
Special Edition: D&E Returns	September 5, 2020	D&E 컴백 리얼 제작기 EP02
46	September 7, 2020	돌아온 <특규 리턴즈> 이번엔 3:3 팀전이다!
47	September 9, 2020	세기의 찌개 대결(?)! 고독한(?) 요리사 이특 VS 신속 정확 이과요리 규현
48	September 11, 2020	어차피 우승은 ㅇㅇ..? 두 셰프의 자존심이 걸린 리벤지 매치 결과 발표!
49	September 21, 2020	시작부터 감성 충만...☆ 남다른 슈주표 음악쇼! <미스터 심플 트롯>
50	September 23, 2020	90년대 갬성에 흥드레날린 대폭발★ 미스터 심플 트롯 <예선 1차전>
51	September 25, 2020	[속보] 슈주 메보 라인 교체 선언! 대이변 일으킨 그는 도대체 누구?
52	September 28, 2020	발라규의 치트키에 입이 떡... 슈주 찐 보컬 대결의 서막 <예선 2차전>
53	September 30, 2020	찐찐찐 찐 이야~ 웃음기 쏙 뺀 슈주 본캐들의 자존심 대결!
54	October 2, 2020	어차피 MC는 OO!! 기계도 알아본 본투비 MC (조작 아님)
55	October 5, 2020	슈주표 트롯 대결 <미스터 심플 트롯> 불꽃 튀는 본 경연 시작!
56	October 7, 2020	트롯으로 인생을 보여드리겠습니다~ 트롯계 재간둥이의 등장!
57	October 9, 2020	발라드와 트롯 그 사이 어딘가(?) 트롯계 예(술)성(대) 납시오~
58	October 12, 2020	무대를 뒤집어 놓으셨다! 초선의원(?)과 개그 트롯 신동(?)의 반전 무대
59	October 14, 2020	발라드 황태자를 넘어 트롯 황태자를 꿈꾸는 조규恨의 애절한 무대
60	October 16, 2020	마지막도 슈주스럽게? <미스터 심플 트롯> 최종 순위 발표 대공개!
61	October 26, 2020	콩그레추레이션~♬ 쏟아지는 축하 릴레이 슈주 자축 파티!
62	October 28, 2020	그 시절 레전드 예능 총출동! 남다른 슈주표 <15주년 기념 단합대회>
63	October 30, 2020	웰컴투 복고 댄스 파뤼! 추억의 <댄스 신고식>
64	November 2, 2020	본인도 내외(?)하는 도전곡의 등장! 슞망진창 <수중 노래방>
65	November 4, 2020	항마력 부르는 우리 멤버의 비즈니스에 삐그덕대는 팀워크
66	November 6, 2020	역대급 똥손(?) 자체발광 보석미남이 쏘아올린 불운의 그림자
67	November 9, 2020	역대급 덩손(?)을 딛고 성공 or 실패?! <수중 노래방> 그 마지막!
68	November 11, 2020	그때 그 시절 핫한 예능 콜라보! 무한도전X런닝맨 <무한 런닝맨>
69	November 13, 2020	이변의 연속! <무한 런닝맨> 1R
70	November 16, 2020	연이은 탈락... 시작된 복수, 그렇게 탄생한 흑화 예성! <무한 런닝맨> 2R
71	November 18, 2020	다큐 빰쳤던 흑화 예성 vs 힘동해 대결! 과연 <무한 런닝맨>의 승리팀은?
72	November 20, 2020	15주년을 함께한 멤버들의 진솔한 이야기! 15주년~ 최선 2YAO!
73	November 23, 2020	예능계 마이다스의 손 1CP팀 vs 손만 댔다 하면 쪽박 2CP팀 <슈주 예능국>
74	November 25, 2020	(MSG 과다) 자극적인 아이템이 쏟아진다? 본격적인 회의 시작!
75	November 27, 2020	동동보살 상담소 신장 개업! 멤버들도 몰랐던 작곡가 동해의 고민은?
76	November 30, 2020	규현의 충격 고백!! 예능에서 절대 빼놓을 수 없는 이것(?)을 못하겠어요
77	December 2, 2020	지독한 상남자(?) 예성이 스윗남으로 변신할 방법은~?
78	December 4, 2020	(속)김려욱 개명설(보) 동동보살이 지어 준 새 이름은?
79	December 7, 2020	데뷔 16년 차 이특과 은혁, 가슴팍에 이름표를 붙이게 된 사연은?
80	December 9, 2020	리더로서의 이특 필요 있을까요? 변화를 마주하는 리더 이특의 고민은?
81	December 11, 2020	슈주의 실세를 가린다! 본격 막내 온 탑 매치 : 세기의 대결 <령구vs꾸루>
82	December 14, 2020	발라규 치트키에 속수무책?! 두 막내의 치열한 발라드 노래 맞히기!
83	December 16, 2020	꾸루의 독주를 멈추게 할 령구의 야심 찬 게임 등장!
84	December 18, 2020	손에 땀을 쥐게 하는 숨 막히는 두뇌 싸움! 최고의 계략가는 누구?
85	December 21, 2020	위트 섹시 다 하는 두 남자의 텐미닛 토크쇼! <동해물과 예섹쇼>
86	December 23, 2020	어무니 아부지 샛노랑 입은 은박자 나왔슈
87	December 25, 2020	뉴욕타임즈 슈퍼스타(?) 힙댄규! 마이클 잭규 타임!
88	December 28, 2020	구독과 좋아요는 필수! 뷰티 너튜버 이틴트가 예섹쇼에 떴다!
89	December 30, 2020	댄스 폭주! 노래 폭주! 멘트 폭주! 슞망진창 토크쇼
90	January 1, 2021	거장 봉동 감독과 땅부자 어린왕자까지! 예섹쇼 제작비 괜찮아요..?
91	January 4, 2021	키스 가족 여러분 반가워요~ FM 11.06 MHz 슈퍼주니어의 <키스 더 리턴즈>
92	January 6, 2021	다들 이정도 개인기는 기본이였잖아? 그때 그 시절 개인기 타-임
93	January 8, 2021	많은 곡만큼 담긴 사연도 한~가득! 슈주가 뽑는 슈주의 최애곡은?
94	January 11, 2021	E.L.F.와의 추억 공유 시간! 라떼 시절 매운맛 예능 추억 소환!
95	January 13, 2021	슈퍼주니어 때문에 울고 웃었던 E.L.F들 다 나와!
96	January 15, 2021	슈주를 위한 특별 선물 & E.L.F.를 위한 특별 선물
97	January 25, 2021	모아~모아~ E.L.F.의 소원 모아~ 1억 뷰 달성 공약 실천! 마지막 아이템은?!
98	January 27, 2021	???:오늘은 집에 갈 거죠(?)...다시 슈주를 찾은 반가운 얼굴은 누구?
99	January 29, 2021	체육대회라며!? 슞망진창 난투극(?)으로 변한 1라운드의 승자는?
100	February 1, 2021	이 날을 기다려왔다! 원샷 원킬 2R 승마 펜싱!
101	February 3, 2021	끝판왕이 나가신다! 다윗과 골리앗의 승마 펜싱 결승전!
102	February 5, 2021	"???: 땡겨! 찢어!" 요가가 이렇게 치열한 운동인 줄은 오늘 알았어요
103	February 8, 2021	"찐으로 할게요 예능 말고~" 슈주가 보여주는 진짜 커플 요가?
104	February 10, 2021	"나 여기 있고~ 너 거기 있띠~" 왕의 슈주 속 공길이는 누구?
105	February 12, 2021	여보시게.. 그리로 가서는 아니 되오... 4지4색 외줄 타기 합동작전!
106	February 15, 2021	마지막 라운드! 짝꿍의 건강까지 챙겨주는 지압판 2인3각 달리기!
107	February 17, 2021	'우동X체육대회' 마지막 of 마지막 경기! 어차피 우승은 ㅇㅇㅇ?
108	February 19, 2021	2020년 그 자체였던 <슈주 리턴즈4>는 여기까지! 최선2YAO!
10th Studio Album Production	March 16, 2021	EP01 <House Party> 안무연습
10th Studio Album Production	March 17, 2021	EP02 <House Party> 안무연습 2
10th Studio Album Production	March 17, 2021	스페셜 영상
10th Studio Album Production	March 18, 2021	EP03 <House Party> MV촬영
10th Studio Album Production	March 19, 2021	EP04 <House Party> MV촬영 2
