= TvN Show =

South Korean TV channel

tvN SHOW
- Country: South Korea
- Broadcast area: Nationwide
- Headquarters: CJ E&M Center, 66 Sangamsan-ro, Sangam-dong, Mapo-gu, Seoul, South Korea

Programming
- Language: Korean
- Picture format: 1080i (HDTV)

Ownership
- Owner: CJ ENM Entertainment Division
- Key people: Rhee Myung-han (channel head)
- Sister channels: tvN; tvN DRAMA; tvN STORY; tvN SPORTS; Mnet; OCN; OCN Movies; OCN Thrills; CATCH ON 1; CATCH ON 2; Tooniverse; Chunghwa TV; UXN (4K UHD)

History
- Launched: 26 January 2018 (8 years ago)
- Replaced: XTM
- Former names: XtvN (January 26, 2018 to August 31, 2021)

Links
- Website: tvNSHOW.tving.com

tvN Show (stylized as tvN SHOW) is a South Korean TV channel, owned by CJ ENM E&M Division.

The channel, then known as XtvN, was originally scheduled to launch on January 19, 2018, replacing XTM due to the latter's low ratings. Due to delays, the launch took place on January 26, 2018. The channel was relaunched with its current name on September 1, 2021, together with sister channel tvN Drama (formerly OtvN).

The channel features shows that focus strongly on millennials, specifically targeting viewers between the ages 15 to 39.

== Programs ==
=== TV series ===
Year	English Title	Hangul
2018	Sweet Revenge 2	복수노트 2

=== Entertainment ===
Year	English Title	Hangul
2018	Keyword #BoA	키워드#보아
2018	Super Junior's Super TV	슈퍼TV
2018	Everyday Swag	오늘도 스웩
2018	Can Love Be Translated	사랑도 통역이 되나요
2018	Red Velvet's Level Up Project! 2	레벨업 프로젝트2
2018	TVXQ!'s The 72-Hour	동방신기의 72시간
2018	EXO's Travel the World, Through a Ladder of Fortune	사다리 타고 세계여행
2019	GOT7's Real Thai	레알타이
