= Dice (Onew song) =

Single by Onew

from the EP Dice
- Language: Korean
- Released: April 11, 2022
- Genre: K-pop
- Length: 3:06
- Label: SM; Dreamus
- Songwriters: Kang Eun-jung; Will Lobban-Bean; Griffith Clawson; Jesse Fink
- Producers: Cook Classics; Hitchhiker

Onew singles chronology
"Mind Warning" (2022)	"Dice" (2022)	"The Sun is in My Eyes" (2022)

Music video
- "Dice" on YouTube

"Dice" is a song by South Korean singer Onew. It was released on April 11, 2022, through SM Entertainment and served as the lead single for the EP of the same name. "Dice" was written by Kang Eun-jung, Will Lobban-Bean, Griffith Clawson and Jesse Fink, and produced by Lobban-Bean and Hitchhiker.

== Background and release ==
Following the release of Onew's debut solo EP, Voice, in 2018, he went on hiatus due to mandatory military service. In March 2022, his agency SM Entertainment announced he would resume his solo music career with the release of his second EP Dice, led by the single of the same name. Another song was originally intended as lead single but it fell through. Onew instead opted for "Dice" because he liked its rhythm. Image teasers were uploaded to social media beginning March 31, and the song was released alongside its accompanying music video on April 11. Onew promoted the song with performances on M Countdown, Music Bank, Inkigayo and Show! Music Core.

== Composition ==
"Dice" is a "breezy" and "mellifluous" pop song underpinned by rhythmical guitar plucking and synthesizer sounds that intensify in the chorus. The lyrics compare love to a game; Onew sings about rolling the dice and betting on love despite knowing it's a game he will likely lose.

== Music video ==
The music video for "Dice" opens with Onew gazing at a woman through a hotel window, only to witness her be abducted by a masked individual. Onew enters the hotel in an effort to save her and is met with various foes along the way. He traverses the hotel's many rooms by rolling a magical dice, disguising himself first as a prince and then as a bellboy. He eventually reunites with his love interest, who does not require rescuing and instead dispatches the enemies herself.

== Critical reception ==
Writing for MTV, Sarina Bhutani called "Dice" "one of Onew's most unique works to date" and described it as "a song that feels like wind in your hair and sunshine on your skin". Divyansha Dongre of Rolling Stone India praised it as a "quintessential summer single", highlighting Onew's "signature dulcet vocalizations".

=== Year-end lists ===
"Dice" on year-end lists
Critic/Publication	List	Rank	Ref.
CNN Philippines	Our favorite K-pop songs of 2022	—N/a	
Dazed	The best K-pop tracks of 2022	25	

== Credits and personnel ==
Credits adapted from the liner notes of Dice.

Recording

- Recorded at SM Starlight Studio and SM Yellow Tail Studio
- Digitally edited at SM LVYIN Studio
- Mixed at SM Blue Cup Studio
- Mastered at 821 Sound Mastering

Personnel

- Onew – vocals, background vocals
- Kang Eun-jung – lyrics
- Will Lobban-Bean – composition
- Griffith Clawson – composition
- Jesse Fink – composition
- Cook Classios – arrangement
- Hitchhiker – arrangement, guitar, keyboard
- Lee Min-gyu – recording
- No Min-ji – recording
- Lee Ji-hong – digital editing
- Jeong Eui-seok – mixing
- Kwon Nam-woo – mastering

== Charts ==
Chart performance for "Dice"
Chart (2022)	Peak position
South Korea (Gaon)	16

== Release history ==
Release dates and formats for "Dice"
Region	Date	Format	Label	Ref.
Various	April 11, 2022	Digital download; streaming	SM; Dreamus	
