= Music Universe K-909 =

South Korean television program

- Promotional poster
- Also known as: K-909
- Hangul: 뮤직 유니버스 K-909
- RR: Myujik yunibeoseu K-909
- MR: Myujik yunibŏsŭ K-909
- Genre: Entertainment, music
- Presented by: BoA
- Country of origin: South Korea
- Original language: Korean
- No. of episodes: 21

Production
- Production location: South Korea
- Production company: JTBC

Original release
- Network: JTBC2
- Release: September 24, 2022 – present

Music Universe K-909 (Korean: 뮤직 유니버스 K-909), also known simply as K-909, is a South Korean music program presented by BoA, with K-pop professor Jaejae and K-pop assistant Haewon (Nmixx).

Music Universe K-909 is a show features appearances of popular k-pop acts and "newcomers", who perform live on stage and interact with the audience throughout each episode. It airs every Saturday at 16:40 KST on JTBC, starting from September 24, 2022.

== Synopsis ==
It is a show that contains "the infinite expansion of K-pop, which is a world-leading 'music to be seen" that is completed with visual concepts and performances through first publicly released songs, special collaboration stages, and documentary videos containing the artist's diverse world of music.

== Segments ==
- Next Generation: This segment introduces future artist who have "the potential to lead the next generation of K-pop" every week on the stage. It highlight newcomers or lesser-known artists.
- Global Chart Forum: This is a segment presented by Jaejae and Haewon of Nmixx where they will analyze 'Global K-pop Chart', which aggregates the worldwide K-pop music and album sales in depth and take charge of the corner dealing with K-pop trends by setting a new topic each time. The segment also will show their deep K-pop knowledge in a quiz showdown prepared ambitiously by the production team of 'K-pop Over-immersion' and answered the high-level questions accurately.
- First Stage Performance: This is a segment where artist performed their new released song for the first time on stage.
- Global Collaboration Stage: This is a segment where various domestic and foreign artists joined for a special collaboration stage.

== Episodes ==
=== Performances ===
– First stage performance
– Exclusive stage performance
– 4K on air
– 4K + exclusive stage or first stage performance

Episode 1

Episode 1 was broadcast on September 24, 2022.

Guest	Song title	Original performer	Next Generation
Nmixx	"No. 1"	BoA	Xdinary Heroes
Nmixx	"Dice"	Nmixx	Xdinary Heroes
NCT 127	"2 Baddies"	NCT 127	Xdinary Heroes
NCT 127	"1, 2, 7 (Time Stops)"	NCT 127	Xdinary Heroes
NCT 127	"Faster"	NCT 127	Xdinary Heroes
Xdinary Heroes	"Love Me Right"	Exo	Xdinary Heroes
Crush	"Rush Hour"	Crush	Xdinary Heroes
BoA, Crush	"Starry Night"	BoA	Xdinary Heroes
Crush	"Oasis" (live band version)	Crush	Xdinary Heroes

Episode 2

Episode 2 was broadcast on October 1, 2022.

Guest	Song title	Original performer	Next Generation
Lily (Nmixx)	"Time for the Moon Night"	GFriend	Hanbin (Tempest) (First Vietnamese K-Pop idol)
Yuju	"I Will Go to You Like the First Snow"	Ailee	Hanbin (Tempest) (First Vietnamese K-Pop idol)
Ailee	"O.O"	Nmixx	Hanbin (Tempest) (First Vietnamese K-Pop idol)
Ailee, Yuju and Lily	"This Is Me"	Keala Settle	Hanbin (Tempest) (First Vietnamese K-Pop idol)
Tempest	"The Real" (Heung version)	Ateez	Hanbin (Tempest) (First Vietnamese K-Pop idol)
Xiumin	"Serenity" "Brand New"	Xiumin	Hanbin (Tempest) (First Vietnamese K-Pop idol)
Coogie and Simon Dominic	"Set Go"	Coogie and Simon Dominic	Hanbin (Tempest) (First Vietnamese K-Pop idol)
Loco and Woo	"We Are"	Loco and Woo	Hanbin (Tempest) (First Vietnamese K-Pop idol)
Simon Dominic, Loco, Woo and Coogie	"TTFU"	Simon Dominic, Loco, Woo and Coogie	Hanbin (Tempest) (First Vietnamese K-Pop idol)

Episode 3

Episode 3 was broadcast on October 8, 2022.

Guest	Song title	Original performer	Next Generation
10cm and Big Naughty	"Beyond Love"	10 cm and Big Naughty	
Big Naughty	"Dali, Van, Picasso"	Beenzino	
10 cm	"My Love By My Side"	Kim Hyun-sik	
10 cm and Big Naughty	"Just 10 Centimetres"	10 cm and Big Naughty	
Seulgi	"28 Reasons"	Seulgi	
Seulgi	"I'm Sorry"	BoA	
Seulgi featuring Be'O	"Bad Boy, Sad Girl"	Seulgi featuring Be'O	
Be'O	"Counting Stars"	Be'O	
Be'O	"Complex"	Be'O	
Stray Kids	"Case 143"	Stray Kids	
Stray Kids	"3Racha"	Stray Kids	
Stray Kids	"Taste"	Stray Kids	
Stray Kids	"Can't Stop"	Stray Kids	

Episode 4

Episode 4 was broadcast on October 15, 2022.

Guest	Song title	Original performer	Next Generation
STAYC and MeloMance	"Love Maybe"	MeloMance	AleXa
MeloMance	"Rush Hour"	Crush	AleXa
STAYC and Melomance	"Hype Boy"	NewJeans	AleXa
Sieun	"I Always Miss You"	Lee Sun-hee	AleXa
STAYC and Melomance	"Beautiful Monster"	STAYC	AleXa
Kwon Jin-ah	"Stupid Love"	Kwon Jin-ah	AleXa
AleXa	"Spider"	Hoshi	AleXa
Mamamoo	"Illella"	Mamamoo	AleXa
Mamamoo	"Atlantis Princess"	BoA	AleXa
Mamamoo	"1,2,3 Eoi!"	Mamamoo	AleXa

Episode 5

Episode 5 was broadcast on October 22, 2022.

Guest	Song title	Original performer	Next Generation
Park Ji-hoon	"Nitro"	Park Ji-hoon	Purple Kiss
Baekho	"We Don't Care No More"	Baekho	Purple Kiss
Taeyeon	"I Like You"	George	Purple Kiss
Baekho	"No Rules"	Baekho	Purple Kiss
Purple Kiss	"Psycho"	Red Velvet	Purple Kiss
Lee Chan-hyuk	"Eyewitness Account"	Lee Chan-hyuk	Purple Kiss
Lee Chan-hyuk	"Panorama"	Lee Chan-hyuk	Purple Kiss
Le Sserafim	"Sour Grapes"	Le Sserafim	Purple Kiss
Huh Yunjin	"Raise Y_our Glass"	Huh Yunjin	Purple Kiss
Le Sserafim	"Antifragile"	Le Sserafim	Purple Kiss

Episode 6

Episode 6 was broadcast on October 29, 2022.

Guest	Song title	Original performer	Next Generation
Classy	"Tick Tick Boom"	Classy	DKZ
Classy	"Zealous"	Classy	DKZ
Younha	"Event Horizon"	Younha	DKZ
Younha	"Oort Cloud"	Younha	DKZ
DKZ	"Kill This Love"	Blackpink	DKZ
Kihyun	"Youth"	Kihyun	DKZ
Kihyun	"Someone's Someone"	Monsta X	DKZ
(G)I-dle	"Tomboy"	(G)I-dle	DKZ
(G)I-dle	Nxde	(G)I-dle	DKZ
Minnie, Yuqi	"Change"	(G)I-dle	DKZ
Minnie, Yuqi	"Dark (X-File)"	(G)I-dle	DKZ
Minnie, BoA	"Only One"	BoA	DKZ

Episode 7

Episode 7 was broadcast on November 12, 2022.

Guest	Song title	Original performer	Next Generation
Sokodomo	"Merry-Go-Round"	Sokodomo featuring Zion.T and Wonstein	
Jo Yu-ri	"Loveable"	Jo Yu-ri	
Jo Yu-ri	"Better"	BoA	
Kim Jong-hyeon	"Lights"	Kim Jong-hyeon	
Jukjae	"Do You Want to Walk with Me?"	Jukjae	
Jukjae	"Lights"	Jukjae	
Dynamic Duo	"Baaam"	Dynamic Duo	
Thama featuring Dynamic Duo	"Real Thing"	Thama featuring Dynamic Duo	
Highlight	"Alone"	Highlight	
Highlight	"Seven Wonders"	Highlight	

Episode 8

Episode 8 was broadcast on November 19, 2022.

Guest	Song title	Original performer	Next Generation
Woo!ah!	"Love Dive"	Ive	Woo!ah!
Jung Seung-hwan	"The Wind Is Blowing"	Lee So-ra	Woo!ah!
Xiaojun of WayV	"Ending Scene"	IU	Woo!ah!
Jung Eun-ji	"Journey for Myself"	Jung Eun-ji	Woo!ah!
Jung Eun-ji	"Blue Whale"	Jung Eun-ji	Woo!ah!
Ten of WayV	"Birthday"	Ten	Woo!ah!
Chen	Last Scene"	Chen	Woo!ah!
Chen	"I Don't Even Mind"	Chen	Woo!ah!

Episode 9

Episode 9 was broadcast on November 26, 2022.

Guest	Song title	Original performer	Next Generation
BoA	"Only One"	BoA	Mirae
BoA	"Garden in the Air"	BoA	Mirae
BoA	"Better"	BoA	Mirae
Mirae	"God's Menu"	Stray Kids	Mirae
Hynn	"The Lonely Bloom Stands Alone"	Hynn	Mirae
Hynn and Jo Gwang-il	"Orpheus"	Hynn featuring Jo Gwang-il	Mirae
Viviz	"Come on Baby Tonight"	Viviz	Mirae
Kang Seung-sik of Victon	"What If"	Kang Seung-sik of Victon	Mirae
BoA	"Forgive Me"	BoA	Mirae

Episode 10

Episode 10 was broadcast on December 3, 2022.

Guest	Song title	Original performer	Next Generation
Tei	"Same Pillow"	Tei	Alice
Tei	"Monologue"	Tei	Alice
Alice	"Heart Burn"	Sunmi	Alice
Xdinary Heroes	"You're the One"	J.Y Park	Alice
J.Y. Park	"Who's Your Mama"	J.Y. Park	Alice
J.Y. Park	"She Was Pretty"	J.Y. Park	Alice
J.Y. Park	"Honey"	J.Y. Park	Alice
J.Y. Park	"Don't Leave Me"	J.Y. Park	Alice
J.Y. Park	"Groove Back"	J.Y. Park	Alice
Xdinary Heroes	"Hair Cut"	Xdinary Heroes	Alice

Episode 11

Episode 11 was broadcast on December 10, 2022.

Guest	Song title	Original performer	Next Generation
Jung Seung-hwan	"Thank You"	Jung Seung-hwan	Seodo Band
Seodo Band	"28 Reasons"	Seulgi	Seodo Band
WayV	"Phantom"	WayV	Seodo Band
WayV	"Love Talk"	WayV	Seodo Band
Shinhwa WDJ	"Flash"	Shinhwa WDJ	Seodo Band
Shinhwa WDJ	"Guest"	Shinhwa WDJ	Seodo Band
Minho	"Chase"	Minho	Seodo Band
Minho	"Area"	Shinee	Seodo Band

Episode 12

Episode 12 was broadcast on May 6, 2023.

Guest	Song title	Original performer	Next Generation
Woodz	"Journey"	Woodz	Xikers
Ha Hyun-sang	"Time and Trace"	Ha Hyun-sang	Xikers
Xikers	"Shine"	Pentagon	Xikers
STAYC	Milky Way"	BoA	Xikers
Ive	"Eleven" + "Love Dive"	Ive	Xikers
Ive	"I Am"	Ive	Xikers
BtoB	"Wind And Wish"	BtoB	Xikers
BtoB	"Blooming Day"	BtoB	Xikers

Episode 13

Episode 13 was broadcast on May 13, 2023.

Guest	Song title	Original performer	Next Generation
Xdinary Heroes	"Freakin' Bad"	Xdinary Heroes	Tri.be
Tri.be	"Twit"	Hwasa	Tri.be
Lee Mujin	"Perfect"	Ed Sheeran	Tri.be
Lee Mujin	"Ordinary Confession"	Lee Mujin	Tri.be
Hui (Pentagon)	"Energetic"	Wanna One	Tri.be
Young K	"Rose Blossom"	H1-Key	Tri.be
Aespa	"Welcome To MY World"	Aespa	Tri.be
Aespa	"Spicy"	Aespa	Tri.be

Episode 14

Episode 14 was broadcast on May 27, 2023.

Guest	Song title	Original performer	Next Generation
Kard	"Icky"	Kard	Epex
Dreamcatcher	"Bon Voyage"	Dreamcatcher	Epex
Epex	"Baby Good Night"	B1A4	Epex
Joohoney	"Freedom"	Joohoney	Epex
Joohoney	"Hype Energy"	Joohoney	Epex
Enhypen	"Bite Me"	Enhypen	Epex
Enhypen	"Attention, please!"	Enhypen	Epex

Episode 15

Episode 15 was broadcast on June 3, 2023.

Guest	Song title	Original performer	Next Generation
Paul Kim	"Hangang" (featuring Big Naughty)	Paul Kim	P1Harmony
Paul Kim	"About You"	Paul Kim	P1Harmony
P1Harmony	"Rocking"	Teen Top	P1Harmony
AB6IX	"Blaze"	AB6IX	P1Harmony
AB6IX	"Loser"	AB6IX	P1Harmony
10cm	"My Ultimate First Love"	10 cm	P1Harmony
10cm	"For Love"	10 cm	P1Harmony

Episode 16

Episode 16 was broadcast on June 10, 2023.

Guest	Song title	Original performer	Next Generation
Midnatt	"Masquerade"	Midnatt	ATBO
ATBO	"Warrior"	B.A.P	ATBO
Fromis 9	"#menow"	Fromis 9	ATBO
Fromis 9	"Blind Letter"	Fromis 9	ATBO
Taeyong	"Gwangdo"	Taeyong	ATBO
Taeyong	"Shalala"	Taeyong	ATBO
Taeyong	"Virtual Insanity"	Taeyong	ATBO

Episode 17

Episode 17 was broadcast on June 17, 2023.

Guest	Song title	Original performer	Next Generation
CSR	"Dolphin"	Oh My Girl	CSR
Libelante	"Verità"	Fernando Varela	CSR
Mijoo	"Movie Star"	Mijoo	CSR
Ren	"Ready to Move"	Ren	CSR
Vanner	"Prime Time" (Prod. Ryan S. Jhun)	Vanner	CSR
Ateez	"Feeling Like I Do"	Ateez	CSR
Ateez	"Bouncy (K-Hot Chilli Peppers)"	Ateez	CSR

Episode 18

Episode 18 was broadcast on July 1, 2023.

Guest	Song title	Original performer	Next Generation
Secret Number	"Madonna"	Secret	Secret Number
Kim Sung-kyu	"Don't Move"	Kim Sung-kyu	Secret Number
Kim Sung-kyu	"Small Talk"	Kim Sung-kyu	Secret Number
Kang Daniel	"Wasteland"	Kang Daniel	Secret Number
Kang Daniel	"SOS"	Kang Daniel	Secret Number
Choi Ye-na	"Hate Rodrigo (Feat. Yuqi ((G)-Idle)"	Choi Ye-na	Secret Number
Han Seung-woo	"Dive Into"	Han Seung-woo	Secret Number

Episode 19

Episode 19 was broadcast on July 8, 2023.

Guest	Song title	Original performer	Next Generation
Shinee	"Gravity"	Shinee	&Team
Shinee	"Hard"	Shinee	&Team
Roy Kim	"Love Poem"	IU (singer)	&Team
Roy Kim	"We Go High"	Roy Kim	&Team
&Team	"Run"	BTS	&Team
Woobin (Cravity)	"Breath"	Park Hyo-shin	&Team
Swan	"Twenty (Prod. Jungkey)"	Swan	&Team

Episode 20

Episode 20 was broadcast on July 15, 2023.

Guest	Song title	Original performer	Next Generation
Nmixx	"Hey Mama"	David Guetta	
Nmixx	"Party O'Clock"	Nmixx	
Zerobaseone	"And I"	Zerobaseone	
Zerobaseone	"In Bloom"	Zerobaseone	
U-KISS	"The Wonderful Escape"	U-KISS	
U-KISS	U-KISS Medley "Man Man Ha Ni + Binguel Binguel + Neverland"	U-KISS	
Jongho (Ateez)	"Gravity"	Jongho (Ateez)	
Taeil (NCT)	"Starlight"	Taeil (NCT)	

Episode 21

Episode 21 was broadcast on July 22, 2023.

Guest	Song title	Original performer	Next Generation
Sandara Park	"Festival"	Sandara Park	Kardi
Yugyeom	"Lolo"	Yugyeom	Kardi
Kardi	"When I Move"	Kara	Kardi
Hyolyn	"Bae"	Hyolyn	Kardi
Yoo Hwe-seung	"Ich Bin, Ich Bin Musik"	Michael Kunze	Kardi
Suho	"Warum kannst Du mich nicht lieben, wie ich bin?	Michael Kunze	Kardi
Sunwoo Jung-a	"Love War"	Sunwoo Jung-a	Kardi
Sunwoo Jung-a	"Cloud"	BoA	Kardi

=== Non-Korean performances ===
Ep.	Air date	Artists		Song
Ep.	Air date	Domestic	Foreign	Song
1	September 24, 2022	Chungha	Christopher	"Bad Boy"
3	October 8, 2022	Kim Chaewon	Salem Ilese	"Mad at Disney" (Note: A clip of the performance was shown as a preview for the show which aired on September 14, 2022.)
3	October 8, 2022	Kim Chaewon and Huh Yunjin	Salem Ilese	"Good Parts (When the Quality Is Bad but I Am)"
4	October 15, 2022	Minnie	Lauv	"All 4 Nothing (I'm So in Love)"
5	October 22, 2022	Chuu	Jeremy Zucker	"Comethru"
10	December 3, 2022	Lee Su-hyun	Lang Lang	"Remember Me"
15	June 3, 2023	Doyoung	Justin Hurwitz	"Audition (The Fools Who Dream)"
15	June 3, 2023	Doyoung	Justin Hurwitz	"Gold Dust"
16	June 10, 2023	Sunwoo (The Boyz)	Ruel	"Painkiller
16	June 10, 2023	—N/a	Ruel	"Someone Else's Problem"
17	June 17, 2023	Lia (Itzy)	Sigrid	"Don't Kill My Vibe"
18	July 1, 2023	Seo Eun-kwang (BtoB)	AJR	"The Dumb Song"
19	July 8, 2023	Tiffany Young	Logan Floyd	"My Own Best Friend" + " Hot Honey Rag"

=== Global Chart Forum ===
Scoring system
Period covered	Chart system	
Period covered	Global music	Album
September 24, 2022 – present	70%	30%

Ep.	Date	Song	Artist	Points
1	September 4–10, 2022	"After Like"	Ive	755
2	September 11–17, 2022	"Pink Venom"	Blackpink	1000
3	September 18–24, 2022	"Shut Down"	Blackpink	1000
4	September 25 – October 1, 2022	"Shut Down"	Blackpink	847
5	October 2–8, 2022	"Shut Down"	Blackpink	701
6	October 9–15, 2022	"Shut Down"	Blackpink	703
7	October 23–29, 2022	"Antifragile"	Le Sserafim	730
8	October 30 – November 5, 2022	"The Astronaut"	Jin	752
9	November 6–11, 2022	"The Astronaut"	Jin	1000
10	November 13–19, 2022	"Antifragile"	Le Sserafim	1000
11	November 20–26, 2022	"Antifragile"	Le Sserafim	925
12	November 27 – December 3, 2022	"Antifragile"	Le Sserafim	701
13	December 4–10, 2022	"Antifragile"	Le Sserafim	710
14	December 11–17, 2022	"Antifragile"	Le Sserafim	734
15	December 18–24, 2022	"Ditto"	New Jeans	700
16	December 25–31, 2022	"Ditto"	New Jeans	700
17	January 1–7, 2023	"Ditto"	New Jeans	700
18	January 8–14, 2023	"Ditto"	New Jeans	701
19	January 15–21, 2023	"Ditto"	New Jeans	1000
20	January 22–28, 2023	"Ditto"	New Jeans	702
21	January 29 – February 4, 2023	"OMG"	New Jeans	700
22	February 5–11, 2023	"OMG"	New Jeans	735
23	February 12–18, 2023	"OMG"	New Jeans	700
24	February 19–25, 2023	"OMG"	New Jeans	829
25	February 26 – March 4, 2023	"OMG"	New Jeans	773
26	March 5–11, 2023	"OMG"	New Jeans	705
27	March 12–18, 2023	"OMG"	New Jeans	715
28	March 19–25, 2023	"Set Me Free Pt. 2"	Jimin	1000
29	March 26 – April 1, 2023	"Flower"	Jisoo	745
30	April 2–8, 2023	"Flower"	Jisoo	1000
31	April 9–15, 2023	"I Am"	Ive	847
32	April 16–22, 2023	"I Am"	Ive	701
33	April 23–29, 2023	"Super"	Seventeen	786
34	April 30 – May 6, 2023	"Unforgiven (featuring Nile Rodgers)"	Le Sserafim	775
35	May 7–13, 2023	"Cupid (Twin Version)"	Fifty Fifty	700
36	May 14–20, 2023	"Cupid (Twin Version)"	Fifty Fifty	700
37	May 21–27, 2023	"Cupid (Twin Version)"	Fifty Fifty	700
38	May 28 – June 3, 2023	"Cupid (Twin Version)"	Fifty Fifty	700
39	June 4–10, 2023	"S-Class"	Stray Kids	758
40	June 11–17, 2023	"Take Two"	BTS	700
41	June 18–24, 2023	"Queencard"	(G)I-dle	707
42	June 25 – July 1, 2023	"Queencard"	(G)I-dle	710
43	July 2–8, 2023	"Queencard"	(G)I-dle	1000

== Similar programs ==
- Mnet M Countdown
- SBS Inkigayo
- KBS Music Bank
- MBC Show! Music Core
- Arirang TV Pops in Seoul
- Arirang TV Simply K-Pop (formerly called The M-Wave and Wave K)
- Arirang TV Show K-Pop
- JTBC Music on Top
- MBC M Show Champion
- SBS M The Show

== See also ==
- Music programs of South Korea
