= Monster (Red Velvet – Irene & Seulgi song) =

2020 debut single by Red Velvet - Irene & Seulgi

Single by Red Velvet - Irene & Seulgi

from the EP Monster
- Language: Korean
- Released: July 6, 2020
- Recorded: 2020
- Studio: SM Studios (Seoul)
- Genre: R&B; dubstep; dance-pop
- Length: 2:58
- Label: SM; Dreamus
- Composers: Yaakov 'Yash' Gruzman; Delaney Jane; Jenson Vaughan; Yoo Young-jin
- Lyricist: Kenzie

Red Velvet - Irene & Seulgi singles chronology
"Monster" (2020)	"Naughty" (2020)

Music video
- "Monster" on YouTube

"Monster" is a song recorded by Red Velvet - Irene & Seulgi, the first sub-unit of South Korean girl group Red Velvet, for their 2020 eponymous debut extended play. A dance-pop track with influence from dubstep genre, the song was written by songwriter Kenzie, while production was handled by Yaakov 'Yash' Gruzman, Jenson Vaughn, Delaney Jane and Yoo Young-jin. It was released on July 6, 2020 by SM Entertainment and Dreamus, serving as the lead single from their first major release.

== Music video ==
The music video for the song was scheduled to be released with the song on July 6 but it was delayed and eventually released the next day. On June 4, 2021, the music video for the track reached 100 million views on YouTube.

== Commercial performance ==
"Monster" debuted at number 8 on the South Korean Gaon Digital Chart, becoming the duo's first top 10 hit. It debuted atop the Download chart for the period July 5—11, 2020 and peaked at number 13 on the component Streaming Chart. The song entered the Billboard K-Pop 100 at number 28 on the chart issue dated July 11, 2020. It peaked at number three in the following week. The track appeared as the 157th biggest hit single on 2020's Gaon Year-End Digital Chart.

In Malaysia, "Monster" debuted at 16, and peaked at eight. The song debuted at number 30 on the New Zealand Hot Singles Chart. In Singapore, the track debuted at 18 on the Streaming Chart, and peaked at five. The song also debuted at number six on the Regional Chart, and peaked at two. On the Billboard World Digital Song Sales chart, the track debuted and peaked at number seven becoming the duo's first top 10 hit on the chart.

== Critical reception ==
Following its initial release, "Monster" was met with mixed to positive reviews from music critics. Rania Aniftos of Billboard magazine described the track as "bold", further praising Irene and Seulgi for "preaching their confident individuality, and the "monster" inside as they deliver sultry choreography weaved in with eerie, paranormal scenery.". Writer Riddhi Chakraborty of Rolling Stone India described the song as "one of the most stand-out singles of the year" referring to the subunit's "fascinating use of dark pop and dubstep". On another song review, writers Kim Sung-hwan, Yeol Shim-hi, Yoo Seong-eun, and Cha Yoo-jung of Y-Magazine described the track as "well-organized, from narratives reminiscent of delicate horror movies", further adding the "style with the energy of thought in the midst of mystery by utilizing its bold movements and images of femme fatale", while rating the track with three point five stars out of five. In an individual album review, Kim Do-heon of IZM viewed the track as "a neat composition without superfluousness" adding that "there is a lack of element that can be imprinted".

Buzzfeed ranked the song number 30 on their list, citing it as "delightfully scary as they detail possessing someone and toying with them as they struggle to break free from their hold". Dazed magazine chose the song as one of their 40 best K-pop songs of 2020 describing the subunit's "gratifyingly noisy, and lyrically teasing" song. The song was featured on Metro's 'The best K-Pop comebacks of 2020 ranked' at number 8, describing "Monster" as "sexy and slightly terrifying". Nación Rex described the song as "elegant, mysterious, and obscure" further praising Irene and Seulgi for portraying their "artistic essence". Rolling Stone India praised the song as "plenty of glamor and glitter" further adding the "imagery that can only be defined as creepy". Furthermore, Teen Vogue described the song as "ferocious" and "intensely fun".

== Accolades ==
On July 17, 2020, "Monster" managed to achieve a music show trophy from Music Bank. It also got nominated for the "Artist of the Year – Digital Music (July)" in Gaon Chart Music Awards. However, Kriz who worked in the song's chorus won the "Performer of the Year - Chorus" in the same award show.

Awards and nominations for "Monster"
Year	Organization	Award	Result	Ref.
2021	Gaon Chart Music Awards	Artist of the Year – Digital Music (July)	Nominated	
2021	Gaon Chart Music Awards	Performer of the Year – Chorus (Note: Kriz was credited as nominee)	Won	

Music program awards
Program	Date	Ref.
Music Bank	July 17, 2020	

== Credits and personnel ==
Credits adapted from the liner notes of Monster.

Studio

- Recorded, edited, engineered for mix, and mixed at SM BoomingSystem
- Recorded at SM Blue Cup Studio
- Mastered at Sonic Korea

Personnel

- Red Velvet - Irene & Seulgi – vocals, background vocals
- Kenzie – Korean lyrics, vocal directing
- Yaakov 'Yash' Gruzman – composition, arrangement, drums, keyboards & synths, programming
- Delaney Jane – composition, background vocals
- Jenson Vaughn – composition
- Yoo Young-jin – composition, vocal directing, recording, digital editing, mixing engineer, mixing
- Kriz – background vocals
- Jeong Eui-seok – recording
- Jung Yu-ra – digital editing
- Jeon Hoon – mastering

== Charts ==
=== Weekly charts ===
Weekly chart performance
Chart (2020)	Peak position
Malaysia (RIM)	8
New Zealand Hot Singles (RMNZ)	30
Singapore (RIAS)	5
South Korea (Gaon)	8
South Korea (K-pop Hot 100)	3
US World Digital Song Sales (Billboard)	7

=== Monthly charts ===
Monthly chart performance
Chart (2020)	Position
South Korea (Gaon)	18

=== Year-end charts ===
2020 year-end charts
Chart (2020)	Position
South Korea (Gaon)	157

== Release history ==
Release dates and formats for "Monster"
Region	Date	Format(s)	Label(s)	Ref.
Various	July 6, 2020	Digital download; streaming	SM Entertainment; Dreamus	

== See also ==
- List of Music Bank Chart winners (2020)
