= Accidentally on Purpose (EP) =

- Digital cover

EP by Seulgi
- Released: March 10, 2025
- Length: 18:24
- Language: Korean
- Labels: SM; Kakao
- Producers: Keith Askey; Tarron Crayton; G'harah "PK" Degeddingseze; John Ho; Pxpillon; Erick Serna; Jeff Shum; Slow Rabbit; Albin Tengblad; The Wavys; YNG Josh

Seulgi chronology
28 Reasons (2022)	Accidentally on Purpose (2025)

Singles from Accidentally on Purpose
- 1. "Baby, Not Baby" Released: March 10, 2025

Accidentally on Purpose is the second extended play by South Korean singer Seulgi. It was released by SM Entertainment on March 10, 2025, and contains six tracks, including the lead single "Baby, Not Baby".

== Background and release ==
In November 2024, SM Entertainment announced in its roadmap that Seulgi would make her comeback in the first quarter of 2025. On February 18, 2025, it was announced that Seulgi would release her second extended play titled Accidentally on Purpose on March 10. Promotional schedule was also released on the same day. The album trailer videos were released on February 24. Each teaser images and highlight clips were released on February 27, February 28, March 3, March 4, and March 5. On March 7, the music video teaser for "Baby, Not Baby" was released. The extended play was released alongside the music video for "Baby, Not Baby" on March 10.

== Composition ==
Accidentally on Purpose contains six tracks. The lead single, "Baby, Not Baby", was described as a pop dance song featuring a striking melody that unfolds dramatically, accompanied by a funky bass line and refreshing electric guitar sounds. It conveys an honest and confident message about staying true to oneself, without being confined by the image or role imposed by others.

The second track, "Better Dayz", was described as alternative pop. The lyrics explore the paradoxical nature of hope, offering an escape into a dreamlike state as a temporary reprieve from reality. Seulgi's restrained vocals, delivered from the perspective of an omniscient being, enhance the song's enigmatic and atmospheric vibe. The third track, "Rollin' (With My Homies)" was described as a R&B pop that captures the laid-back, urban vibe of the U.S. West Coast. With lyrics describing a spontaneous road trip with friends and Seulgi's soothing vocals reassuring that everything will be okay, the song evokes a comforting sense of freedom and ease.

The fourth track, "Whatever", is a medium-tempo R&B-pop song featuring a groovy rhythm and laid-back vocals. The song reflects Seulgi's cool and carefree attitude, embracing the idea of moving at one's own pace without being concerned by others' opinions or judgment. The fifth track, "Praying", was described as a slow-tempo R&B track characterized by a rich bass sound and dreamy vocals that evoke a lingering emotional resonance and a surreal sense of immersion. The lyrics gently convey a sense of sorrow and reverence toward the precious beings who offer constant support and become the reason to breathe and live again.

The sixth track, "Weakness", for which she participated in writing the lyrics, is described as an emotional love song featuring a soft melody and a light, airy EP sound. It delivers a sense of sweetness through fresh lyrics that describe being endlessly clumsy and vulnerable after coming to a late realization of love. Seulgi's charming vocals further enhance the tenderness of the track.

== Promotion ==
Prior to the release of Accidentally on Purpose, on March 10, 2025, Seulgi held a live event called "Seulgi 'Accidentally on Purpose' Countdown Live" on YouTube, TikTok and Weverse, aimed at introducing the extended play and connecting with her fanbase.

To promote the song "Baby, Not Baby, she performed the lead single on 1theK's 1theKILLPO On March 12. She later performed the song on various music shows, Mnet's M Countdown on March 13, KBS2's Music Bank on March 14, MBC's Show! Music Core on March 15, and SBS's Inkigayo on March 16.

== Track listing ==
Accidentally on Purpose track listing
No.	Title	Lyrics	Music	Arrangement	Length
1.	"Baby, Not Baby"	Kenzie	Becca Krueger; Erick Serna; Hollyn Shadinger; Charlie Snyder	Erick Serna	3:13
2.	"Better Dayz"	Moon Yeo-reum (Jam Factory)	Slow Rabbit; Pxpillon; Blush Davis; Chris James	Slow Rabbit; Pxpillon	3:01
3.	"Rollin' (With My Homies)"	Danke (Lalala Studio)	Tricia Battani; G'harah "PK" Degeddingseze; Kirsten Collins	G'harah "PK" Degeddingseze	3:11
4.	"Whatever"	Geumto (153/Joombas); Lee Hye-yum (Jam Factory)	Tarron Crayton; Darius Coleman; Yng Josh; Albin Tengblad; TMM; Em Walcott	Tarron Crayton; Yng Josh; TMM	3:05
5.	"Praying"	Danke (Lalala Studio); Kang Eun-jeong	Jack Brady; Trey Campbell; Elsa Curran; Alain James Leroux; Jordan Roman	The Wavys	3:05
6.	"Weakness"	Seulgi; Bang Hye-hyun (Jam Factory); Yoon Ye-ji (Jam Factory)	Keith Askey; Livvi Franc; John Ho; Jeff Shum	Keith Askey; John Ho; Jeff Shum	2:47
Total length:					18:24

== Credits and personnel ==
Credits adapted from the EP's liner notes.

Studio

- SM Aube Studio – recording (1, 3–4), digital editing (3)
- SM Big Shot Studio – recording, digital editing (1), engineered for mix (1–2), mixing (4)
- SM Droplet Studio – recording (2, 4), digital editing (2, 5)
- Doobdoob Studio – recording (3–4), digital editing (2–3, 5–6)
- SM LVYIN Studio – recording (3)
- SM Yellow Tail Studio – recording (5), digital editing, engineered for mix (4, 6)
- Studio505 – recording (6)
- SM Blue Ocean Studio – digital editing, mixing (1)
- SM Blue Cup Studio – digital editing (2), mixing (2, 5)
- SM Starlight Studio – digital editing, mixing (3)
- SM Concert Hall Studio – digital editing, mixing (6)
- SM Wavelet Studio – engineered for mix (3)
- 821 Sound – mastering (all)

Personnel

- Seulgi – vocals (all), background vocals (4–6)
- Kenzie – vocal directing (1)
- Hollyn Shadinger – background vocals (1)
- Erick Serna – producer (1)
- Slow Rabbit – producer (2), keyboard (2), synthesizer (2)
- Pxpillon – producer (2), synthesizer (2)
- G'harah "PK" Degeddingseze – producer (3)
- Tricia Battani – background vocals (3)
- Kirsten Collins – background vocals (3)
- Darius Coleman – background vocals (4)
- Albin Tengblad – producer (4)
- YNG Josh – producer (4)
- Tarron Crayton – producer (4)
- Jack Brady (The Wavys) – producer (5), background vocals (5)
- Jordan Roman (The Wavys) – producer (5), background vocals (5)
- Trey Campbell – background vocals (5)
- Elsa Curran – background vocals (5)
- Jeff Shum – producer (6)
- John Ho – producer (6)
- Keith Askey – producer (6)
- Jsong – vocal directing (1, 5–6)
- Kriz – vocal directing (2), background vocals (1–2)
- Kyung Da-som – vocal directing (3)
- Ikki – background vocals (3–4)
- Lee Joo-hyung – vocal directing, Pro Tools operating (4)
- Young – guitar (2)
- Jung Eui-seok – recording (1), digital editing (2), mixing (2, 5)
- Kim Hyo-joon – recording (3–4), digital editing (3)
- Lee Min-kyu – recording, digital editing (1), engineered for mix (1–2), mixing (4)
- Kim Joo-hyun – recording (2, 4), digital editing (2, 5)
- Lee Ji-hong – recording (3)
- Kim Ji-hyun – recording (3–4)
- Noh Min-ji – recording (5), digital editing, engineered for mix (4, 6)
- Kim Hyun-joo – recording (6)
- Kim Cheol-sun – digital editing, mixing (1)
- Jeong Yoo-ra – digital editing, mixing (3)
- Nam Koong-jin – digital editing, mixing (6)
- Eugene Kwon – digital editing (2, 5–6)
- Jang Woo-young – digital editing (3)
- Kang Eun-ji – engineered for mix (3)
- Kwon Nam-woo – mastering (all)

== Charts ==
=== Weekly charts ===
Weekly chart performance for Accidentally on Purpose
Chart (2025)	Peak position
Japanese Albums (Oricon)	49
Japanese Download Albums (Billboard Japan)	55
Japanese Top Albums Sales (Billboard Japan)	44
South Korean Albums (Circle)	4

=== Monthly charts ===
Monthly chart performance for Accidentally on Purpose
Chart (2025)	Position
South Korean Albums (Circle)	13

== Release history ==
Release history for Accidentally on Purpose
Region	Date	Format	Label
South Korea	March 10, 2025	CD	SM; Kakao
Various	March 10, 2025	Digital download; streaming	SM; Kakao
