= Seulgi =

South Korean singer (born 1994)

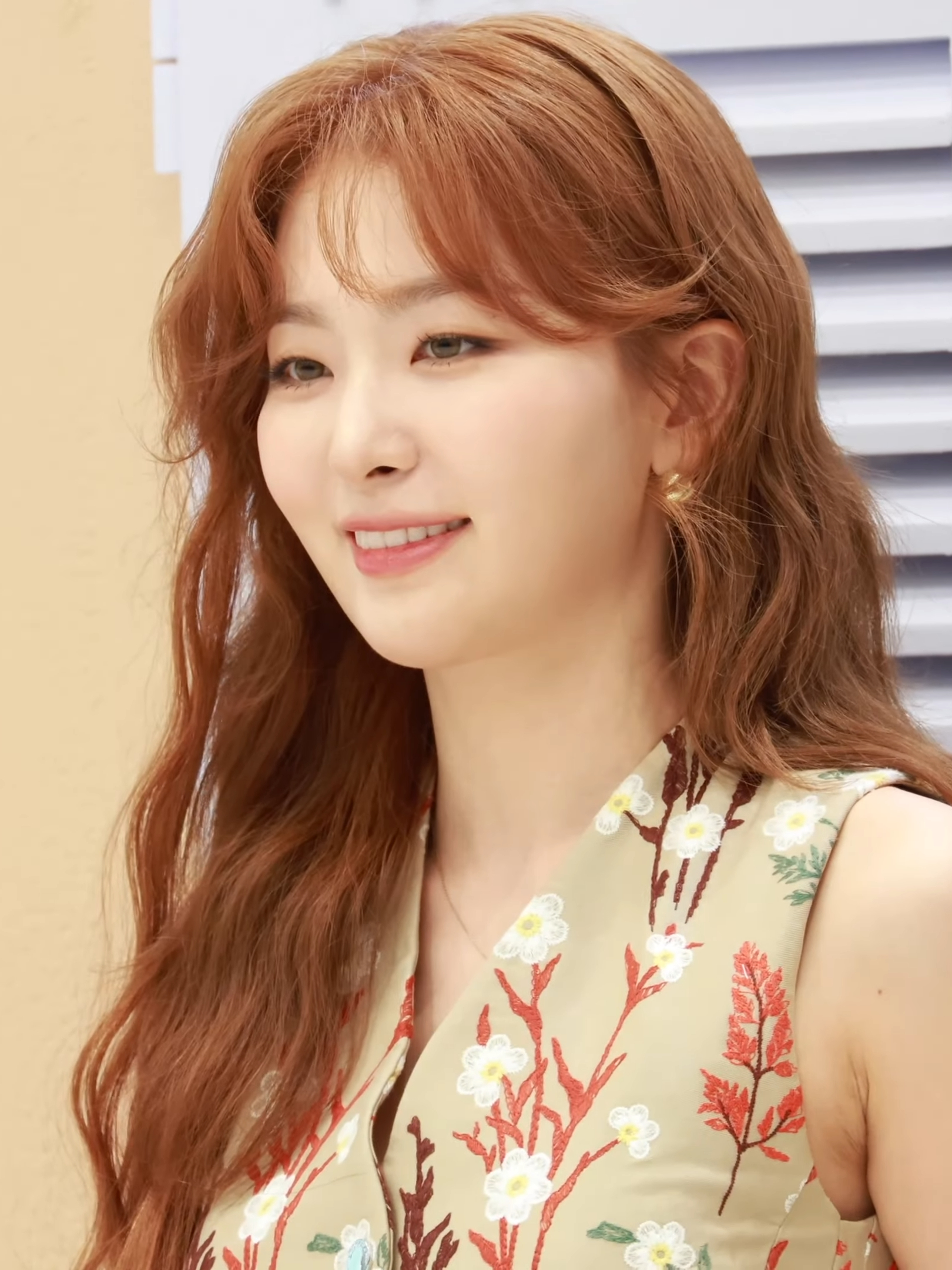
- Seulgi in March 2024
- Born: Kang Seul-gi; February 10, 1994 (age 32); Ansan, Gyeonggi Province, South Korea
- Education: School of Performing Arts Seoul
- Occupations: Singer; dancer; TV Personality
- Years active: 2014–present
- Musical career
- Genres: K-pop; R&B; dance-pop
- Instrument: Vocals
- Label: SM
- Member of: Red Velvet; Red Velvet – Irene & Seulgi; SM Town; Got the Beat
- Formerly of: SM Rookies; Girls Next Door
- Website: Official website

Korean name
- Hangul: 강슬기
- Hanja: 姜슬기
- RR: Gang Seulgi
- MR: Kang Sŭlgi

Signature
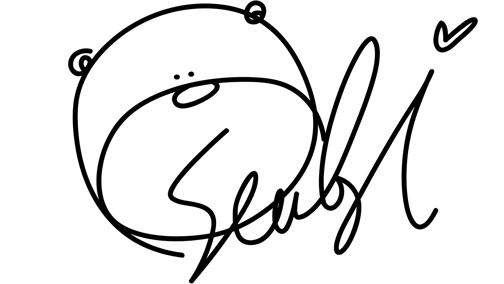

Kang Seul-gi (Korean: 강슬기; born February 10, 1994), known mononymously as Seulgi, is a South Korean singer and dancer. She is a member of the South Korean girl group Red Velvet, its sub-unit Red Velvet – Irene & Seulgi, and the supergroup Got the Beat. She released her debut EP, 28 Reasons, in 2022.

== Early life and education ==
Kang Seul-gi was born on February 10, 1994, in Ansan, Gyeonggi Province, South Korea. Her family consists of her parents and an older brother.

She studied in Ansan Byeolmang Middle School and attended School of Performing Arts Seoul. She can speak both Korean and Japanese.

== Career ==
=== 2007–2014: Pre-debut ===
Seulgi began training at SM Entertainment in 2007. On December 2, 2013, she was one of the first three trainees introduced to the public through SM Entertainment's pre-debut project, SM Rookies, alongside now-NCT members Jeno and Taeyong. Various pre-debut clips of Seulgi were released by SM Entertainment, one of which was a dance performance of "Be Natural" by S.E.S. with Irene. In July 2014, Seulgi was featured on Henry Lau's song "Butterfly" from his second EP Fantastic. She also appeared in the music video of his single "Fantastic".

=== 2014–2018: Debut with Red Velvet and solo activities ===
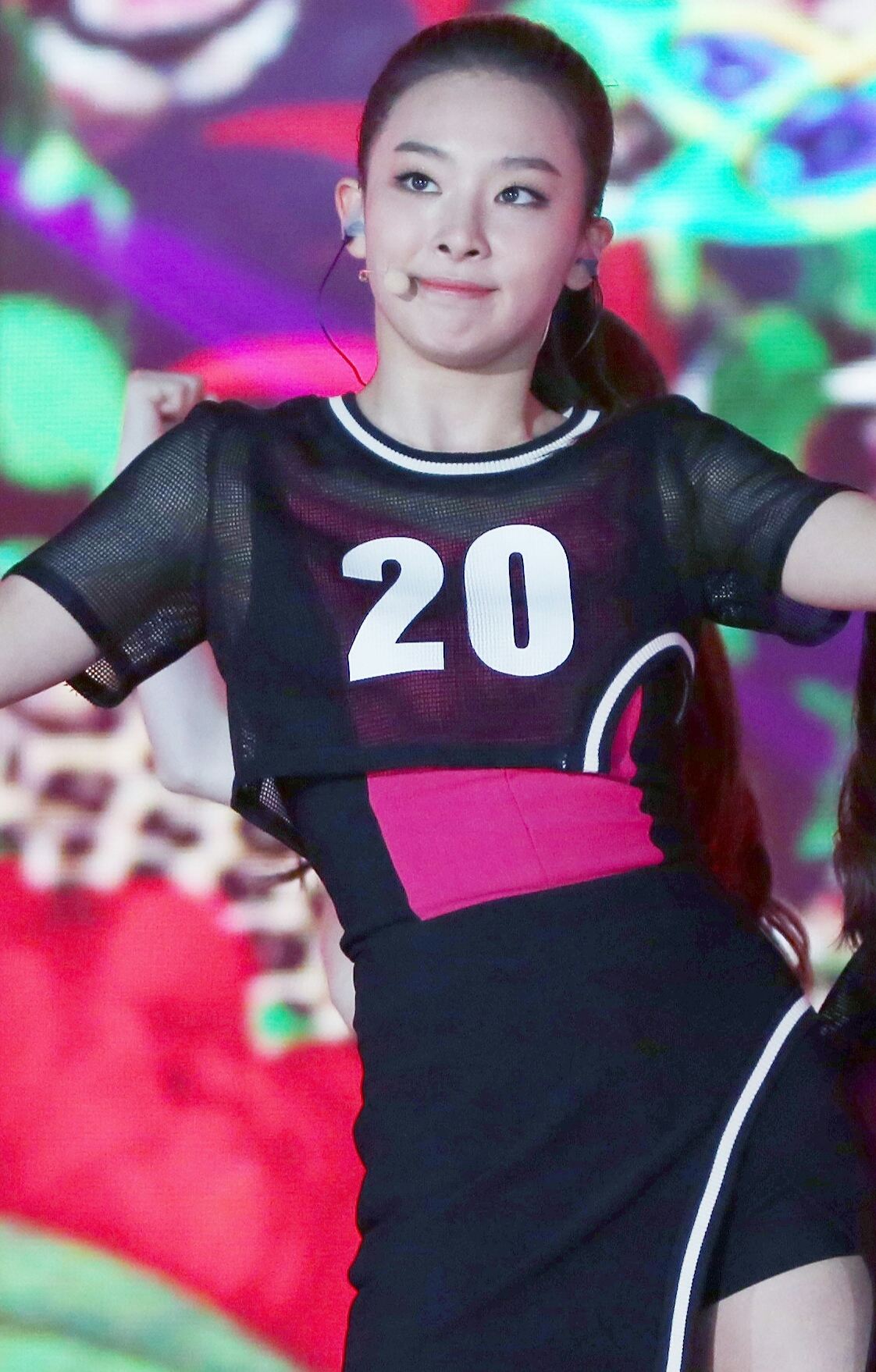
Seulgi performing in 2014

On August 1, 2014, Seulgi made her official debut as a member of Red Velvet.

In January 2015, Seulgi starred in the musical School Oz, playing the lead role of Dorothy. From April to May, she was part of the variety show Off to School.

In July 2016, Seulgi released "Don't Push Me" with bandmate Wendy as part of the soundtrack of the television series Uncontrollably Fond. In October, Seulgi competed on King of Mask Singer under the alias Cinema Heaven. On November 18, she sang the theme song of the MMORPG Blade & Soul, "You, Just Like That" (그대는 그렇게), although it was not officially released as a digital single until 2017. On December 30, Seulgi released the digital single "Sound of Your Heart" with Wendy and other SM artists for the digital music project SM Station.

In January 2017, Seulgi released "You're the Only One I See" with Wendy as part of the soundtrack of the drama Hwarang: The Poet Warrior Youth. As part of SM Station, she also released the duet "Darling U" with labelmate Yesung on January 22. In February, Seulgi and Hwang Chi-yeul collaborated on the song "Our Story", which served as the final track for Hwang's duet project Fall, in girl. In March, Seulgi featured on labelmate Mark's "Drop", an original song performed on High School Rapper. Seulgi was cast alongside six other female idols in the variety show Idol Drama Operation Team, wherein they had to create their own television series, titled Let's Only Walk the Flower Road, as scriptwriters and play fictional versions of themselves, who are part of a fictional music group. The group, called Girls Next Door, released the song "Deep Blue Eyes" and held their debut stage at Music Bank on July 14. On October 27, Seulgi released a remake of the 2001 song "Doll (인형)", originally by Shin Hye-sung and Lee Ji-hoon, along with Kangta and Wendy as part of the second season of SM Station. An accompanying music video featuring footage from their live performance of the song at the SM Town Live Tour V in Japan was released on the same day. That same month, Seulgi featured on labelmate Taemin's song "Heart Stop" from his second studio album Move.

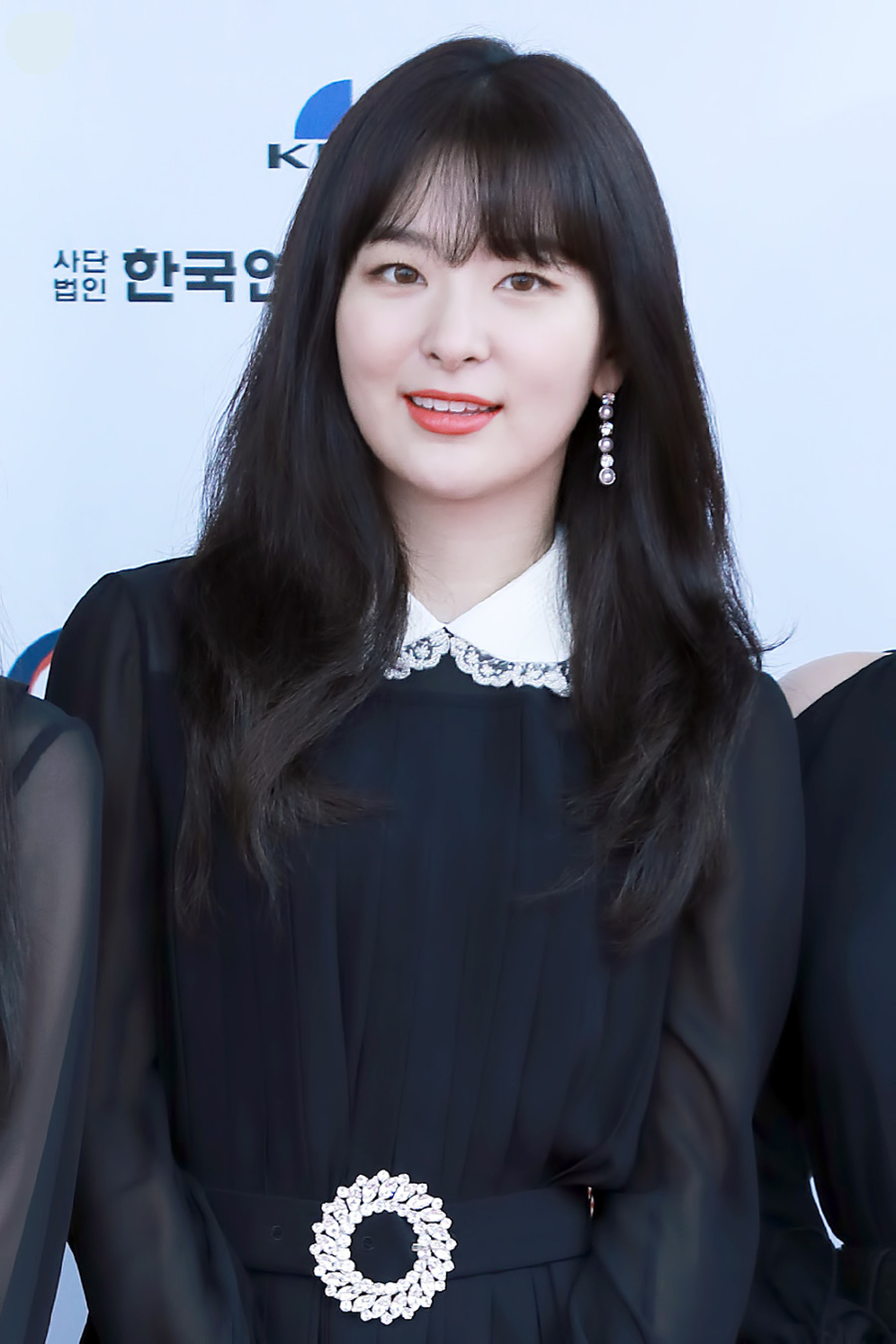
Seulgi in 2018

In February 2018, Seulgi was confirmed as part of the cast of Law of the Jungle in Mexico. In April, she was confirmed as part of the cast of the variety show Secret Unnie. She featured on Moonbyul's debut single "Selfish", which was released on May 23. Seulgi and Wendy starred in the special 100th episode of Battle Trip, which aired for the first time on July 21. In September, Seulgi released the digital single "Wow Thing" with Soyeon, SinB, and Chungha. In October, it was announced that Seulgi had been cast in the television show Cool Kids. On October 15, she featured on Zion.T's "Hello Tutorial", which reached number two on the Gaon Digital Chart.

=== 2019–present: Red Velvet sub-unit, Got the Beat and solo debut ===
On February 12, 2019, Seulgi released "Always", a ballad about eternal love, for the soundtrack of The Crowned Clown.

On April 20, 2020, SM Entertainment confirmed that Seulgi would be part of Red Velvet's first sub-unit, alongside bandmate Irene. Red Velvet – Irene & Seulgi debuted on July 6 with the extended play (EP) Monster. The EP contained the studio version of Seulgi's solo song "Uncover", which was first revealed during Red Velvet's third concert tour La Rouge. She and Irene starred in the spin-off of Red Velvet's reality show Level Up Project!. On November 23, it was announced that Seulgi would translate the series of art essays Art Gallery By My Side: Love, Happiness, Sleep.

On January 25, 2021, Seulgi featured in the music video for labelmate Yunho's "Eeny Meeny". On February 1, Seulgi and rapper Bewhy released a music video for the song "Born Confident" for a Volkswagen campaign. On March 30, it was announced that Seulgi would feature on Wendy's song "Best Friend" from her debut EP Like Water. On April 2, it was announced that Seulgi would host a web music program, The Wise Music Encyclopedia. On June 1, she started hosting her own live show, Seulgi.zip, on Naver Now. On June 7, Seulgi teamed up with NCT's Taeyong on the release of the demo song "Rose" on SoundCloud. The duo co-composed the song with producer SQUAR. On December 28, Seulgi featured on BamBam's song "Who Are You" from his second EP B. On December 27, Seulgi was revealed as a member of the supergroup Got the Beat, alongside bandmate Wendy. The group debuted on January 3, 2022.

On September 13, 2022, it was announced that Seulgi would debut as a soloist with the release of her first EP, titled 28 Reasons, on October 4, led by the single of the same name.

On August 22, 2023, SM Entertainment announced it had "renewed an exclusive contract with Red Velvet's Seulgi". In December 2023, Seulgi sung the OST "Polaroid" for the Season 3 of the reality TV show Unexpected Business.

In January 2024, she sung another OST titled "In My Memory" for the drama Doctor Slump. On February 6, she officially launched her own YouTube channel Hi Seulgi, mirroring the username of her Instagram account. The channel is set to showcase her trendy lifestyle through engaging content on fashion, beauty, and her favorite hobbies. On April 3, another OST sung by Seulgi was released and dedicated to the famous Fu Bao panda, titled "You're My Joy and Luck (넌 기쁨이자 행운이야)". On May 4, she performed as a special guest for BamBam at his Area 52: The 1st World Tour Encore concert in Bangkok, Thailand – their first performance together after they recorded "Who Are You".

On January 15, 2025, the legend diva Kim Wan-sun collaborated with Seulgi for the digital release of the single "Lucky" produced by JYP. Seulgi previously worked with her on a performance of "Tonight" and "Dance in the Rhythm" during the Level Up Project! with Irene, and they also later performed together on the show Dancing Queens on the Road. On February 18, SM Entertainment announced that Seulgi would be releasing her second EP Accidentally on Purpose on March 10, with the lead single "Baby, Not Baby".

== Public image and influence ==
From performance to visual media, Seulgi is an all-rounder artist. Brands often cite her positivity, creativity, passion for her craft, unique sensibility and style and cultural influence (especially among young Koreans) as reasons for why they choose her to represent them.

In Gallup Korea's Idol Preference poll, before its discontinuation in 2020, Seulgi ranked as one of the most popular idols. She topped the monthly "Individual Girl Group Members Brand Power Ranking" published by the Korean Corporate Reputation Research Institute several times. In a survey among soldiers doing mandatory military service in South Korea in 2019, Seulgi ranked as the fourth most popular female K-pop idol.

Seulgi has also been recognized for her fashion sense. Her casual, chic and trendy style has made her an emerging leader in casual fashion and a reference for the MZ generation in South Korea. In particular, her influence on the rise of minimalist fashion among Koreans in their 20s and 30s has been highlighted. In her show Seulgi.zip, a mainly fashion-themed program, Seulgi discussed fashion items, style points and favorite trends with her guests and gave advice to her listeners. Seulgi became the first K-pop act to be selected as global ambassador for Italian luxury brand Salvatore Ferragamo, with the brand representative stating that they selected Seulgi for her popularity as a fashion icon, a successful performer, and an influential entertainer.

== Other ventures ==
=== Endorsements ===
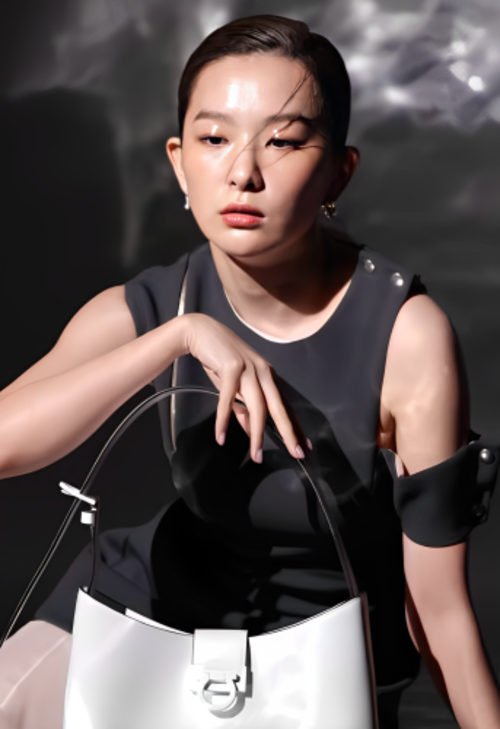
Seulgi for Marie Claire Korea (2021)

Beyond collaborating on various endorsements with her bandmates, Seulgi has also shined as an individual brand ambassador. In March 2018, she was selected to model Nike's collection for the South Korea national football team, the Red Devils 2018 Collection. From 2018 to 2021, Seulgi served as the face of Converse Korea, becoming their first female brand ambassador. Started with the "One Star" campaign under the slogan "no one can evaluate me", Seulgi and Converse campaigned for support on one's own values and standards.

On December 23, 2019, Seulgi was announced as the face of Coca-Cola's 2020 campaign "Little Big Moments" along with actor Park Bo-gum. Several days later, French retailer L'Occitane launched a new campaign featuring Seulgi as the ambassador for their OMY "City Palette" shea butter hand cream.

In January 2021, Seulgi became the new ambassador of Volkswagen Korea. She served as the face of a new campaign for their new T-Roc model and helped promote it with original music and video for their slogan "Born Confident". In February, Seulgi was officially named as the South Korean brand ambassador for the Italian luxury brand Ferragamo through a photoshoot with Harper's Bazaar, and was later announced on June 29 as global brand ambassador through their shoe capsule collection campaign "Let's Dance". In April, Seulgi was announced as the newest model for cosmetics brand Amuse. In December, she became the muse of Istkünst, a Korean unisex streetwear brand.

In September 2022, Seulgi became a muse of Under Armour Korea and modeled on various collections of the brand.

In June 2023, Adobe Korea launched the "With Photoshop, Anyone Can" advertising campaign with Seulgi.

=== Arts and photography ===
Alongside her work as a dancer and vocalist, Seulgi is also recognized for her art and photography skills. In 2016, she was chosen as the honorary ambassador for the 18th Bucheon International Fantastic Film Festival to spread public awareness on animated films and to help students and lesser known artists in the field gain more opportunities. In 2019, she voiced an audio guide in M. Chat exhibit's of world class graffiti artists at Seoul Arts Center.

French company L'Occitane collaborated with Seulgi in 2019 for their "City Palette" campaign, where she designed a city map for eco bags to convey the beauty of nature in cities that are heavily affected by pollution.

Due to Seulgi's love for the arts, Maronie Books asked her to translate their Art Museum By My Side project in 2020. The series is a collection of 35 artworks for each theme of Love, Happiness and Sleep, aiming to serve as guide to those who find it difficult to enjoy art due to lack of professional knowledge. Seulgi's translation of the book, originally written in English by Shana Gozansky, presented both the text and Seulgi's interpretations and featured notes on her personal favorites.

In November 2021, Seulgi joined the Lacoste and Peanuts "We Play Collective" campaign that aimed to promote harmony among diverse people, wherein participants selected famous Peanuts quotes and expressed them through drawings with motifs that symbolize Lacoste.

On February 10, 2022, Seulgi published a poster book with her very own artworks that convey personal moments of happiness. In August, the luxury jewelry brand Fred Paris collaborated with Seulgi on their first emoji brand campaign, named "Seulggomi", inspired by her bear nickname from fans. From production planning to final design of the character and Kakaotalk stickers, she personally participated to help demonstrate Fred's brand identity through representative collections worn by her and the character itself.

Seulgi's 2023 campaign with Adobe Photoshop Korea featured quick tutorials using her travel photos and drawings, and launched a contest for users to create their own album covers using photoshop tools.

In October 2024, Seulgi launched her first film exhibit titled Nothing Special, But Special. It showcased photographs taken by herself over time, along with glimpses of her private life as captured by photographer Rie. She also released a complementary photobook that narrates what film photography means to her, and how she got started.

== Discography ==
=== Extended plays ===
List of extended plays, showing selected details
Title	Details	Peak chart positions		Sales
Title	Details	KOR	JPN	Sales
28 Reasons	Released: October 4, 2022; Label: SM, Dreamus; Formats: CD, digital download, streaming	3	13	KOR: 241,304; JPN: 4,930 (Phy.)
Accidentally on Purpose	Released: March 10, 2025; Label: SM, Kakao; Formats: CD, digital download, streaming	4	49	KOR: 154,969; JPN: 1,341 (Phy.)

=== Singles ===
List of singles, showing year released, selected chart positions, sales figures, and album name
Title	Year	Peak chart positions			Sales	Album
Title	Year	KOR Circle	KOR Billb. (Note: Includes the Billboard K-pop Hot 100 (defunct as of 2022), and South Korea Songs (part of Billboard's Hits of the World (defunct as of 2025)).)	US World	Sales	Album
As lead artist
"28 Reasons"	2022	113	—	—	—N/a	28 Reasons
"Baby, Not Baby"	2025	147	—	—	—N/a	Accidentally on Purpose
As featured artist
"Butterfly" (Henry Lau featuring Seulgi)	2014	—	—	—	KOR: 14,070	Fantastic
"Drop" (Mark Lee featuring Seulgi)	2017	93	—	—	KOR: 46,443	High School Rapper FINAL
"Heart Stop" (Tae-min featuring Seulgi)	2017	—	—	—	—N/a	Move
"Selfish" (Moonbyul featuring Seulgi)	2018	84	—	—	—N/a	Selfish / Red Moon
"Hello Tutorial" (Zion.T featuring Seulgi)	2018	2	2	—	—N/a	ZZZ
"Best Friend" (Wendy featuring Seulgi)	2021	— (Note: "Best Friend" did not enter the Gaon Digital Chart but peaked at position 34 on the component Download Chart.)	—	—	—N/a	Like Water
"Who Are You" (BamBam featuring Seulgi)	2021	— (Note: "Who Are You" did not enter the Gaon Digital Chart but peaked at position 28 on the component Download Chart.)	—	9	—N/a	Non-album single
Collaborations
"Sound of Your Heart" (with SM Town, Steve Barakatt)	2016	—	—	—	—N/a	SM Station Season 1
"Darling U" (with Yesung)	2017	—	—	—	—N/a	SM Station Season 1
"Our Story" (with Chiyeol)	2017	28	—	—	KOR: 56,079; CHN: 262,241	Fall In, Girl Vol. 3
"Doll" (with Kangta and Wendy)	2017	—	—	—	—N/a	SM Station Season 2
"Wow Thing" (with Jeon So-yeon, Chungha and SinB)	2018	35	43	3	—N/a	SM Station X 0
"Lucky" (with Kim Wan Sun)	2025	— (Note: "Lucky" did not enter the Circle Digital Chart, but peaked at number 36 on the Download Chart.)	—	—	—N/a	Non-album single
Soundtrack appearances
"Don't Push Me" (with Wendy)	2016	25	—	—	KOR: 182,984	Uncontrollably Fond OST
"I Can Only See You" (with Wendy)	2017	80	—	—	KOR: 24,912	Hwarang OST
"Deep Blue Eyes" (as Girls Next Door)	2017	—	—	—	KOR: 16,514	Idol Drama Operation Team OST
"You, Just Like That"	2017	—	—	—	—N/a	Blade & Soul OST
"Always"	2019	118	—	—	—N/a	The Crowned Clown OST
"Polaroid"	2023	—	—	—	—N/a	Unexpected Business 3 OST
"In My Memory"	2024	—	—	—	—N/a	Doctor Slump OST
Other charted songs
"Uncover"	2020	—	100	—	—N/a	Monster
"Bad Boy, Sad Girl" (featuring Be'O)	2022	— (Note: "Bad Boy, Sad Girl" did not enter Circle Digital Chart, but debuted and peaked at number 57 on Circle Download Chart.)	—	—	—N/a	28 Reasons
"Dead Man Runnin'"	2022	— (Note: "Dead Man Runnin'" did not enter Circle Digital Chart, but debuted and peaked at number 60 on Circle Download Chart.)	—	—	—N/a	28 Reasons
"Anywhere But Home"	2022	— (Note: "Anywhere But Home" did not enter Circle Digital Chart, but debuted and peaked at number 63 on Circle Download Chart.)	—	—	—N/a	28 Reasons
"Crown"	2022	— (Note: "Crown" did not enter Circle Digital Chart, but debuted and peaked at number 66 on Circle Download Chart.)	—	—	—N/a	28 Reasons
"Los Angeles"	2022	— (Note: "Los Angeles" did not enter Circle Digital Chart, but debuted and peaked at number 68 on Circle Download Chart.)	—	—	—N/a	28 Reasons
"Better Dayz"	2025	— (Note: "Better Dayz" did not enter Circle Digital Chart, but debuted and peaked at number 109 on Circle Download Chart.)	—	—	—N/a	Accidentally on Purpose
"Rollin’ (With My Homies)"	2025	— (Note: "Rollin’ (With My Homies)" did not enter Circle Digital Chart, but debuted and peaked at number 111 on Circle Download Chart.)	—	—	—N/a	Accidentally on Purpose
"Whatever"	2025	— (Note: "Whatever" did not enter Circle Digital Chart, but debuted and peaked at number 117 on Circle Download Chart.)	—	—	—N/a	Accidentally on Purpose
"Weakness"	2025	— (Note: "Weakness" did not enter Circle Digital Chart, but debuted and peaked at number 119 on Circle Download Chart.)	—	—	—N/a	Accidentally on Purpose
"Praying"	2025	— (Note: "Praying" did not enter Circle Digital Chart, but debuted and peaked at number 123 on Circle Download Chart.)	—	—	—N/a	Accidentally on Purpose
"—" denotes a recording that did not chart or was not released in that territory.

=== Non-commercial releases ===
List of non-commercial songs, showing title and year released
Title	Year	Ref.
"Rose" (Seulgi featuring Taeyong)	2021	

=== Songwriting credits ===
All song credits are adapted from the Korea Music Copyright Association's database unless stated otherwise.

Name of the song, year released, artist, and name of the album
Year	Artist	Song	Album	Lyricist		Composition	
Year	Artist	Song	Album	Credited	With	Credited	With
2021	Seulgi x Taeyong	"Rose"	Non-album single	Yes	Taeyong	Yes	Taeyong, SQUAR (BLUR)
2022	Herself	"Dead Man Runnin"	28 Reasons	Yes	N/A	No	N/A
2025	Herself	Weakness	Accidentally on Purpose	Yes	Bang Hye-hyun (Jamfactory), Yoon Ye-ji (Jamfactory)	No	N/A

== Videography ==
=== Music videos ===
Title	Year	Director(s)	Ref.
"28 Reasons"	2022	Kwak Doori	
"Baby, Not Baby"	2025	Ha Jung-hoon (Hattrick)	
Collaborations
"Darling U" (with Yesung)	2017	Hong Won Ki (Zanybros)	
"Wow Thing" (with SinB, Kim Chung-ha, and Jeon So-yeon)	2018	Doori Kwak (GDW)	
"Born Confident" (with Bewhy)	2021	readymodel	
"You′re My Joy and Luck"for Fu Bao (piano by Im In Gun)	2024	Kim Jiwook (Major7 E&M)	
"Lucky" (with Kim Wan-sun)	2025	Unknown	
As featured artist
"Selfish" (Moonbyul feat. Seulgi)	2018	Hong Won Ki (Zanybros)	
"Hello Tutorial" (Zion.T feat. Seulgi)	2018	Oui Kim (GDW)	
"Who Are You" (BamBam feat. Seulgi)	2021	HOBIN (a HOBIN film)	

== Filmography ==
=== Film ===
Year	Title	Role	Notes	Ref.
2015	SMTown: The Stage	Herself	Documentary	
2020	Trolls World Tour	Gomdori (voice)	Animated film	

=== Television series ===
Year	Title	Role	Notes	Ref.
2016	Descendants of the Sun	Herself	Cameo	

=== Television shows ===
Year	Title	Role	Notes	Ref.
2015	Off to School	Cast member	Episodes 40–43	
2015	100 People, 100 Songs	Contestant	With Wendy	
2015	Immortal Songs	Contestant	With Wendy and Joy (Episodes 223–224)	
2016	King of Mask Singer	Contestant	As "Masterpiece of the Weekend, Cinema Heaven" (Episode 79)	
2017	Girl Group Battle	Contestant	With Wendy and Joy (Korean New Year Special)	
2017	Idol Drama Operation Team	Cast member		
2018	Law of the Jungle in Mexico	Cast member	Episodes 320–324	
2018	Secret Unnie	Cast member	With Sunmi	
2018	Battle Trip	Contestant	With Wendy (Episodes 100–103)	
2018	Cool Kids	Host	Episodes 1–6	
2024	Immortal Songs	Contestant	With Irene (Episode 647 - TVXQ Special)	

=== Web shows ===
Year	Title	Role	Notes	Ref.
2021	K-Pop Evolution	Herself	Documentary (cameo)	
2021	Wise Music Encyclopedia	Host	With music critic Kim Zakka	

=== Radio shows ===
Year	Radio	Role	Notes	Ref.
2015	Kiss the Radio	Special DJ	With Wendy	
2019	Starry Night	Special DJ		
2021	Seulgi.zip	DJ		

== Theatre ==
Years	Title	Role	Notes	Ref.
2014–2015	School Oz	Dorothy	Lead Role	

== Awards and nominations ==
Name of the award ceremony, year presented, category, nominee of the award, and the result of the nomination
Award ceremony	Year	Category	Nominee / Work	Result	Ref.
Asia Artist Awards	2023	Popularity Award – Singer (Female)	Seulgi	Nominated	
Asian Pop Music Awards (Note: Hosted by the Hong Kong Asia Pacific International Group and Sunway Records, the Asian Pop Music Awards bases its winners on the "Asian Pop Music Chart" which opened in September 2019.)	2022	Top 20 Song of the Year (Overseas)	"28 Reasons"	Won	
Asian Pop Music Awards	2022	Best Female Artist (Overseas)	"28 Reasons"	Nominated	
Asian Pop Music Awards	2022	Song of the Year	"28 Reasons"	Nominated	
Brand Customer Loyalty Awards	2023	Female Soloist	Seulgi	Won	
Circle Chart Music Awards	2023	Song of the Year – October	"28 Reasons"	Nominated	
Fashionista Awards (Note: Jointly hosted by fashion magazine Celeb's Pick and Naver Fashion Beauty, the Fashionista Awards is an online awards ceremony that selects the best style icons based on surveys conducted through Naver.)	2017	Best Fashionista – Rising Star	Seulgi	Nominated	
K-Global Heart Dream Awards	2023	K-Global Bonsang (Main Prize)	Seulgi	Won	
Korea Drama Festival Awards	2024	Best Original Soundtrack	"In My Memory"	Nominated	
Korea First Brand Awards	2023	Female Solo Artist	Seulgi	Nominated	
MAMA Awards	2022	Artist of the Year	Seulgi	Nominated	
MAMA Awards	2022	Best Female Artist	Seulgi	Nominated	
Melon Music Awards	2017	Hot Trend Award	"Deep Blue Eyes" (as Girls Next Door)	Nominated	
Seoul International Drama Awards	2024	Outstanding Drama OST	"In My Memory"	Nominated	
Seoul Music Awards	2023	Main Prize (Bonsang)	Seulgi	Nominated	
MAMA Awards	2025	Fans' Choice Female Top 10	Seulgi	Nominated	
