= Naughty (Red Velvet – Irene & Seulgi song) =

2020 song by Red Velvet – Irene & Seulgi

Single by Red Velvet - Irene & Seulgi

from the EP Monster
- Language: Korean
- Released: July 20, 2020
- Studio: SM, Seoul, South Korea
- Genre: Future house; dance-pop
- Length: 3:19
- Label: SM; Dreamus
- Composers: Moonshine; Louise Frick Sveen; Charite Viken; Yoo Young-jin
- Lyricists: JQ; Lee Yeon-ji

Red Velvet - Irene & Seulgi singles chronology
"Monster" (2020)	"Naughty" (2020)	"Tilt" (2025)

Music video
- "Naughty" on YouTube

"Naughty" (Korean: 놀이; RR: Nori) is a song recorded by Red Velvet - Irene & Seulgi, the first sub-unit of South Korean girl group Red Velvet, for their debut EP Monster. The song was released as the second single from the EP. The track was written by JQ, Yeon-Ji Lee, Charite Viken, Louise Frick Sveen and Moonshine and was also produced by Soo-Man Lee, Moonshine, Young-Jin Yoo and Butterfly. A remix of the song with DJ Demicat was released on July 31 with a music video.

== Background and composition ==
Following the release of "Monster" on July 6, 2020, SM Entertainment revealed that a follow-up song titled "Naughty" will be released on July 20, 2020. The song will then be used for the follow-up promotions of the duo's first extended play, Monster. The song along with the music video was released on the noon of the said release date.

"Naughty"
"Naughty" is a future house and pop dance track. It also contains a recorded pitched down voice.

"Naughty" was produced by Ludvig Evers and Jonatan Gusmark under the name of Moonshine, Louise Frick Sveen, and Charite Viken during a songwriting camp in Trondheim, Norway. In an interview done with YouTube channel ReacttotheK, Moonshine revealed that SM Entertainment was at the actual camp and was interested in the song. A recorded pitched down voice by Charite Viken singing the lyrics "Naughty" was featured in the song.

Musically, Lee Da-kyum of Star Today described "Naughty" as a future house-style pop dance song. Kim Soo-hyun of Sports Chosun noted "Naughty" for its bouncy beats, groovy bass lines, and addictive hooks. It was composed in the key of G major with a tempo of 113 beats per minute. The song's lyrics tell the story of comparison between tension in a close relationship to a hide-and-seek play.

== Reception ==
Following its initial release, "Naughty" was met with positive reviews from music critics. Kim Do-heon of IZM called the track as "well controlled despite the fast progression on the strong base rhythm", praised the low-tone chorus for its "simple yet bold sense of stability", and rated it three-and-a-half stars out of five. Melody Chiu of People described it as an "upbeat dance track with a catchy hook". It was included in CNN Philippines's "Our best K-pop songs of 2020". Paper cited its "groovy bass and pulsing rhythm" and put it at number 14 on their list.

On the week of July 19, 2020, "Naughty" did not enter the Gaon Digital Chart and the Gaon Streaming Chart. However, it debuted at number 83 on the Gaon Download Chart. The song entered the Billboard K-Pop Hot 100 at number 99 on the chart issue dated August 1, 2020. The song peaked at number six on the US World Digital Song Sales chart becoming the highest-peaking song from the EP on the chart.

== Music video ==
=== Background ===
Red Velvet - Irene & Seulgi posing on the ending choreography of "Naughty".

The Gyeonggi Tourism Organization provided the locations for the music video. Locations filmed for the music video include Siheung Baegot Hanul Park Seawater Pool, Gwangmyeong Cave, Anyang Art Park, and Yangju Lighting Museum.

== Track listings ==
Digital download / streaming – Korean version

1. "Naughty" – 3:18

Digital download / streaming – Demicat remix

1. "Naughty (Demicat Remix)" – 3:53

== Credits and personnel ==
=== Korean version ===
Credits adapted from the liner notes of Monster.

Studio

- Recorded and engineered for mix at SM Yellow Tail Studio
- Mixed at SM Blue Ocean Studio
- Mastered at Sonic Korea

Personnel

- Red Velvet - Irene & Seulgi – vocals, background vocals
- JQ – Korean songwriting
- Lee Yeon-ji – Korean songwriting
- Moonshine – composition, arrangement
- Louise Frick Sveen – composition, background vocals
- Charite Viken – composition, background vocals
- Yoo Young-jin – arrangement
- ButterFly – vocal directing, pro tools operation, digital editing
- Noh Min-ji – recording, mixing engineer
- Kim Chul-soon – mixing
- Cheon Hoon – mastering

=== Demicat remix ===
Credits adapted from Melon.

- Red Velvet - Irene & Seulgi – vocals
- JQ – Korean songwriting
- Lee Yeon-ji – Korean songwriting
- Moonshine – composition
- Louise Frick Sveen – composition
- Charite Viken – composition
- Demicat – arrangement

== Charts ==
Weekly chart performance for "Naughty"
Chart (2020)	Peak position
South Korea (K-pop Hot 100)	99
US World Digital Song Sales (Billboard)	6

== Release history ==
Release dates and formats for "Naughty"
Region	Date	Format(s)	Version	Label(s)	Ref.
Various	July 20, 2020	Digital download; streaming	Korean	SM Entertainment; Dreamus	
Various	July 31, 2020	Digital download; streaming	Demicat remix	SM Entertainment; ScreaM Records	
