= Monster (EP) =

- Digital and "Top Note" version cover

EP by Red Velvet – Irene & Seulgi
- Released: July 6, 2020
- Recorded: 2020
- Studio: SM Studio Center (Seoul)
- Genre: K-pop
- Length: 19:42
- Language: Korean; English
- Label: SM; Dreamus

Red Velvet – Irene & Seulgi chronology
Monster (2020)	Tilt (2025)

Singles from Monster
- 1. "Monster" Released: July 6, 2020; 2. "Naughty" Released: July 20, 2020

Monster is the debut extended play by Red Velvet – Irene & Seulgi, the first sub-unit of South Korean girl group Red Velvet. It was released on July 6, 2020, by SM Entertainment, with Dreamus serving as the South Korea distributor. The EP contains six tracks, including the title track of the same name and a follow-up single "Naughty".

== Background and release ==
On April 21, 2020, SM Entertainment confirmed that Irene and Seulgi would form Red Velvet's first sub-unit and that the duo was in preparation for their first major release in around June 2020. The release of the mini album was postponed from June 15 to July 6, 2020, on the grounds that it needed additional production on the album, in order to achieve a higher quality of music. The physical release contains two different versions with a CD, a photo booklet, a lyric book and collectibles.

== Commercial performance ==
According to Hanteo, Monster sold over 80,000 copies on its first day of availability, beating Red Velvet's first day and first week album sales records of the group's sixth extended play The ReVe Festival: Day 1, which set the record at 45,080 copies for its first day, and 71,431 copies for its first week. It also became the best-selling girl group sub-unit album of all time, surpassing Twinkle (2012) by Girls' Generation-TTS. The EP reached 100,000 copies sold on Hanteo in under 3 days, making it the first Red Velvet album to do so.

The EP debuted at number five on the Billboard World Album Chart, becoming the duo's top-five entry.

== Track listing ==
Monster track listing
No.	Title	Lyrics	Music	Arrangement	Length
1.	"Monster"	Kenzie	Yaakov "Yash" Gruzman; Delaney Jane; Jenson David Aubrey Vaughan; Yoo Young-jin	Yaakov "Yash" Gruzman; Yoo Young-jin	2:58
2.	"Naughty" (놀이; Nori; lit. Play)	JQ (Makeumine Works); Lee Yeon-ji (Makeumine Works)	Jonatan Gusmark (Moonshine); Ludvig Evers (Moonshine); Louise Frick Sveen; Charite Viken Reinås; Yoo Young-jin	Moonshine; Yoo Young-jin	3:18
3.	"Diamond"	Kim Yeon-seo (ADC Music)	Daniel "Obi" Klein; Kim Yeon-seo (ADC Music); Andreas Öberg	Daniel "Obi" Klein	3:16
4.	"Feel Good"	Lee Seu-ran	Jonatan Gusmark (Moonshine); Ludvig Evers (Moonshine); Tania Doko; Maribelle Anes	Moonshine	3:13
5.	"Jelly"	Park Green (Joombas)	minGtion (ADC Music); Andrew Choi (ADC Music); Kim Yeon-seo (ADC Music)	ADC Music	3:12
6.	"Uncover" (Seulgi solo)	Kim Yeon-seo (ADC Music)	Joseph Hong; Shim Jae-won (BeatBurger); Kim Yeon-seo (ADC Music)	Joseph Hong	3:41
Total length:					19:42

Notes:

- "Naughty" is only available in the EP as a CD-only track. It was omitted from the digital release of the EP until July 20, 2020, when it was released on Korean music sites as part of the EP and as a standalone digital single in international music sites.

== Credits and personnel ==
Credits adapted from the liner notes of the EP.

Musicians

- Red Velvet – Irene & Seulgi
  - Irene – vocals (tracks 1–5), background vocals (tracks 1–5)
  - Seulgi – vocals (all tracks), background vocals (all tracks)
- Kenzie – Korean lyrics (track 1)
- JQ (makeumine works) – Korean lyrics (track 2)
- Lee Yeon-ji (makeumine works) – Korean lyrics (track 2)
- Kim Yeon-seo – Korean lyrics (tracks 3, 6), composition (tracks 3, 5–6), background vocals (tracks 3, 5–6)
- Lee Seu-ran – Korean lyrics (track 4)
- Park Green (153/Joombas) – Korean lyrics (track 5)
- Yaakov "Yash" Gruzman – composition (track 1), arrangement (track 1), drums (track 1), keyboards & synths (track 1)
- Delaney Jane – composition (track 1), background vocals (track 1)
- Jenson Vaughn – composition (track 1)
- Yoo Young-jin – composition (tracks 1–2), arrangement (tracks 1–2)
- Moonshine – composition (tracks 2, 4), arrangement (tracks 2, 4)
- Louise Frick Sveen – composition (track 2), background vocals (track 2)
- Charite Viken – composition (track 2), background vocals (track 2)
- Daniel "Obi" Klein – composition (track 3), arrangement (track 3)
- Andreas Öberg – composition (track 3), guitar (track 3)
- Tania Doko – composition (track 4)
- Maribelle – composition (track 4)
- MinGtion – composition (track 5), arrangement (track 5), piano (track 5), bass (track 5)
- Andrew Choi – composition (track 5)
- Joseph Hong – composition (track 6), arrangement (track 6)
- Jae Shim – composition (track 6)
- Kriz – background vocals (track 1)
- Seo Mi-rae – background vocals (track 2)

Technical

- Yoo Young-jin – directing (track 1), recording (track 1), digital editing (track 1), mixing engineer (track 1), mixing (track 1)
- Kenzie – directing (track 1)
- ButterFly – vocal directing (track 2), Pro Tools operation (track 2), digital editing (track 2)
- Kim Yeon-seo – directing (tracks 3, 5–6)
- Kriz – vocal directing (track 4)
- Jeong Eui-seok – recording (track 1), mixing (track 5)
- Noh Min-ji – recording (tracks 2, 4–5), mixing engineer (tracks 2–3)
- Kim Cheol-soon – recording (track 3), mixing (track 2)
- Lee Ji-hong – recording (track 6), digital editing (track 6), mixing engineer (tracks 5–6), mixing (track 6)
- Jung Yoo-ra – digital editing (tracks 1, 3)
- Lee Min-kyu – digital editing (track 4), mixing engineer (track 4), mixing (track 4)
- MinGtion – digital editing (tracks 5–6)
- Namkoong Jin – mixing (track 3)
- Cheon Hoon – mastering (tracks 1–2, 6)
- Kwon Nam-woo – mastering (tracks 3–5)

== Charts ==
=== Weekly charts ===
Weekly chart performance for Monster
Chart (2020)	Peak position
Belgian Albums (Ultratop Flanders)	188
Japanese Albums (Oricon)	21
Japanese Combined Albums (Oricon)	23
Japanese Hot Albums (Billboard Japan)	35
South Korean Album (Gaon)	2
UK Digital Albums (OCC)	14
US World Albums (Billboard)	5

=== Monthly charts ===
Monthly chart performance for Monster
Chart (2020)	Peak position
Japanese Albums (Oricon)	42
South Korean Album (Gaon)	4

=== Year-end charts ===
Year-end chart performance for Monster
Chart (2020)	Position
South Korean Album (Gaon)	41

== Certifications and sales ==
Certifications for Monster
Region	Certification	Certified units/sales
South Korea (KMCA)	Platinum	250,000^{^}
^{^} Shipments figures based on certification alone.

== Release history ==
Release history and formats for Monster
Region	Date	Format	Label
South Korea	July 6, 2020	CD; digital download; streaming	SM Entertainment; Dreamus
Various	July 6, 2020	Digital download; streaming	SM Entertainment
