= 28 Reasons =

- Digital cover

EP by Seulgi
- Released: October 4, 2022
- Length: 19:45
- Language: Korean
- Labels: SM; Dreamus

Seulgi chronology
28 Reasons (2022)	Accidentally on Purpose (2025)

Singles from 28 Reasons
- 1. "28 Reasons" Released: October 4, 2022

28 Reasons is the debut extended play by South Korean singer Seulgi. It was released by SM Entertainment on October 4, 2022, and contains six tracks, including the lead single of the same name.

== Background and release ==
On September 6, 2022, SM Entertainment announced that South Korean singer Seulgi, a member of their group Red Velvet, would release her first solo album in October 2022. On September 13, SM revealed the title of her first extended play (EP), 28 Reasons, set to be released on October 4. On the same day, an album trailer video was released. On September 19, the promotional schedule was released. On September 26, a mood sampler video was released through Red Velvet's social media accounts. On October 3, the music video teaser for the lead single, "28 Reasons", was released.

== Composition ==
The EP contains a total of six songs. The lead single, "28 Reasons", is described as a dance-pop song characterized by groovy and heavy bass sounds and featuring a whistling sound. The lyrics depict a character who is both "good and evil" and the way this affects the relationship they are in. "Dead Man Runnin" is a R&B, dance-pop song featuring "energetic" drums, synth sounds, and bass drops. Written by Seulgi, in the lyrics she expresses her anxiety and the emptiness she felt when she was hurt in the past. In an interview with Rolling Stone, Seulgi explained "It was a song that makes you feel like a villain will appear. How will the villain appear? I made up that narrative and thought of someone who would want to destroy the world. These are thoughts we don't normally have. I got a lot of help from films — Joker, in particular. He was hurt and abused before he turned into a villain. When you hear the song, I think those emotions come to the surface."

"Bad Boy, Sad Girl" is a mid-tempo R&B song featuring rapper Be'O that features a "bouncing" piano. "Anywhere but Home" is a "disco-style" song with elements of R&B and dance-pop, with lyrics describing taking a ride to an "unfamiliar place" on a sleepless night. "Los Angeles", is an EDM song with a drop of techno sound. Lyrically, it describes the scenery of the "City of Angels", and the feeling of excitement and anticipation of finding a new dream in an unfamiliar place. "Crown" is an R&B dance-pop track with heavy drum and synth melody.

== Promotion ==
On October 4, 2022, Seulgi held a live broadcast on YouTube and TikTok to commemorate the release of 28 Reasons.

== Critical reception ==
Professional ratings
Review scores
Source	Rating
IZM	3/5 stars
NME	5/5 stars

Rhian Daly of NME called the EP "pure brilliance" in his five-star review, saying it "moves cohesively through dark and delicious tracks that draw from different facets of R&B and dance-inflected pop, each incorporating opposing forces of light and dark, as hinted in the good vs evil narrative". NME listed the EP as one of the best Asian albums of 2022, highlighting "Dead Man Runnin'" as the EP's key track and writing: "28 Reasons is a dark, existential story told through serpentine lyricism, watertight sonics and above all, Seulgi’s dulcet voice, which cuts through the haze like a light at the end of a dark tunnel. 28 Reasons is a solid start for Seulgi as she begins to explore her creative voice and hones her craft." South Korea publication Idology listed the EP as one of the best K-pop albums of the year, praising the themes of duality of the protagonist.

28 Reasons on year-end lists
Critic/Publication	List	Rank	Ref.
NME	25 Best Asian Albums of 2022	11	
Idology	20 Best K-Pop Albums Of 2022	Included	

== Commercial performance ==
28 Reasons debuted at number three on the Circle Album Chart in the chart issue dated October 2–8, 2022, with 171,262 copies sold. In Japan, the EP debuted at number 13 on the Oricon Albums Chart in the chart issue dated October 17–23, 2022, with 4,156 copies sold. On the Billboard Japan Hot Albums, it debuted at number nine in the chart issue dated October 26, 2022.

== Track listing ==
Track listing for 28 Reasons
No.	Title	Lyrics	Music	Arrangement	Length
1.	"28 Reasons"	Jeon Ji-eun; January 8th; Jo Yoon-kyung; Yoo Young-jin	Sean Kennedy; Johan Fransson; Henrik Goranson; Yoo; Kriz	Fransson; Goranson; Yoo; Imlay	3:09
2.	"Dead Man Runnin"	Seulgi	Yaakov "Yash" Gruzman; Shaun Frank; Audra Mae	Gruzman	3:19
3.	"Bad Boy, Sad Girl" (featuring Be'O)	Danke (Lalala Studio); Be'O (rap making)	Dino Medanhodžić; Johanna Jansson; Ryan Jhun; Be'O	Medanhodžić; Jhun	2:57
4.	"Anywhere but Home"	Seo Ji-eum	Emile Ghantous; Leslie Johnson; Josh Goode; Sofia Quinn; Carly Gibert	Ghantous; Johnson	3:21
5.	"Los Angeles"	Jung Il-li	Jennifer Decilveo; Wens; Justin Seiser; Oliver Goldstein	Decilveo; Seiser	3:43
6.	"Crown"	Kim Su-ji (Lalala Studio); Lee Ji-yoon (Jam Factory)	Hitimpulse; Violet Skies; Ilira Gashi	Hitimpulse; Skies; Gashi	3:26
Total length:					19:45

== Credits and personnel ==
Credits adapted from album's liner notes.

Studio

- SM Booming System – recording, mixing, engineered for mix, digital editing (track 1)
- SM Big Shot Studio – recording (track 1, 3, 6), mixing (track 5), digital editing (track 5–6)
- SM Yellow Tail Studio – recording (track 5)
- SM Blue Ocean Studio – mixing (track 4)
- SM Blue Cup Studio – mixing (track 2, 6)
- SM Lvyin Studio – recording (track 2, 6), mixing (track 3), digital editing (track 2–3), engineered for mix (track 3)
- SM Ssam Studio – recording (track 4, 6)
- SM Starlight Studio – digital editing (track 4)
- Sonic Korea – mastering (track 1)
- 821 Sound Mastering – mastering (track 2–6)
- Doobdoob Studio – digital editing (track 1, 3)
- BPM Studio – digital editing (track 3)
- Sound Pool Studio – digital editing (track 6)

Personnel

- SM Entertainment – executive producer
- Lee Soo-man – producer
- Lee Sung-soo – production director, executive supervisor
- Tak Young-jun – executive supervisor
- Seulgi – vocals (all tracks), background vocals (track 2–6), lyrics (track 2)
- Yoo Young-jin – producer (track 1), lyrics, composition, arrangement, vocal director, background vocals, recording, mixing, engineered for mix, digital editing (track 1), music and sound supervisor (all tracks)
- Kriz – composition (track 1), vocal director (track 2), background vocals (track 1)
- January 8 – lyrics (track 1)
  - Jeon Ji-eun – lyrics (track 1)
- Jo Yoon-kyung – lyrics (track 1)
- Sean Kennedy – composition (track 1)
- Johan Fransson – composition, arrangement (track 1)
- Henrik Goranson – composition, arrangement (track 1)
- Imlay – arrangement (track 1)
- Yaakov "Yash" Gruzman – producer (track 2), composition, arrangement, drums, keyboards, synthesizer, programming, background vocals (track 2)
- Shaun Frank – composition (track 2)
- Audra Mae – composition (track 2)
- danke (Lalala Studio) – lyrics (track 3)
- Be'O – lyrics, composition, background vocals (track 3)
- Dino Medanhodžić – producer (track 3), composition, arrangement, background vocals (track 3)
- Johanna Jansson – composition, background vocals (track 3)
- Ryan S. Jhun – producer (track 3), composition, arrangement (track 3)
- Seo Mi-rae (ButterFly) – vocal director (track 3)
- Seo Ji-eum – lyrics (track 4)
- Emile Ghantous – producer (track 4), composition, arrangement (track 4)
- Leslie Johnson – producer (track 4), composition, arrangement (track 4)
- Josh Goode – composition (track 4)
- Sofia Quinn – composition (track 4)
- Carly Gibert – composition, background vocals (track 4)
- Lee Joo-myung – vocal director (track 4)
- Jung Il-li – lyrics (track 5)
- Jennifer Decilveo – producer (track 5), composition, arrangement (track 5)
- Oliver Goldstein – composition (track 5)
- Wens – composition, background vocals (track 5)
- Justin Seiser – producer (track 5), composition, arrangement (track 5)
- Kim Yeon-seo – vocal director (track 5)
- Kim Su-ji (Lalala Studio) – lyrics (track 6)
- Lee Ji-yoon (Jam Factory) – lyrics (track 6)
- Hitimpulse – producer (track 6), composition, arrangement (track 6)
- Violet Skies – composition, arrangement (track 6)
- Ilira Gashi – composition, arrangement (track 6)
- Kim Tae-woo – background vocals (track 6)
- Kenzie – vocal director (track 6)
- Lee Min-gyu – recording (track 1, 3, 6), mixing (track 5), digital editing (track 5–6)
- Lee Ji-hong – recording (track 2, 6), mixing (track 3), digital editing (track 2–3), engineered for mix (track 3)
- Noh Min-ji – recording (track 5)
- Kang Eun-ji – recording (track 4, 6)
- Kim Cheol-sun – mixing (track 4)
- Jung Eui-seok – mixing (track 2, 6)
- Shin Soo-min – mastering assistant (track 1)
- Jeon Hoon – mastering (track 1)
- Kwon Nam-woo – mastering (track 2–6)
- Eugene Kwon – digital editing (track 1)
- Jung Woo-young – digital editing (track 3)
- Min Sung-soo – digital editing (track 3)
- Jung Yu-ra – digital editing (track 4)
- Jung Ho-jin – digital editing (track 6)

== Charts ==
=== Weekly charts ===
Weekly chart performance for 28 Reasons
Chart (2022)	Peak position
Japanese Albums (Oricon)	13
Japanese Hot Albums (Billboard Japan)	9
South Korean Albums (Circle)	3

=== Monthly charts ===
Monthly chart performance for 28 Reasons
Chart (2022)	Peak position
Japanese Albums (Oricon)	50
South Korean Albums (Circle)	8

=== Year-end charts ===
Year-end chart performance for 28 Reasons
Chart (2022)	Position
South Korean Albums (Circle)	58

== Release history ==
Release history for 28 Reasons
Region	Date	Format	Label
South Korea	October 4, 2022	CD	SM; Dreamus
Various	October 4, 2022	Digital download; streaming	SM; Dreamus
