= 28 Reasons (song) =

- Remixes cover with "Los Angeles"

Single by Seulgi

from the EP 28 Reasons
- Language: Korean
- Released: October 4, 2022
- Studio: SM Booming System; SM Big Shot Studio
- Genre: Dance-pop
- Length: 3:09
- Label: SM; Dreamus
- Composers: Kriz; Sean Kennedy; Johan Fransson; Henrik Goranson; Yoo Young-jin
- Lyricists: Jeon Ji-eun; January 8th; Jo Yoon-kyung; Yoo Young-jin
- Producer: Yoo Young-jin

Seulgi singles chronology
"28 Reasons" (2022)	"Baby, Not Baby" (2025)

Music video
- "28 Reasons" on YouTube

"28 Reasons" is the debut single by South Korean singer Seulgi for her debut extended play of the same name. Composed by Sean, Kennedy, Johan Fransson, Henrik Goranson, Yoo Young-jin and Kriz, it is a dance-pop song with trap and heavy-synths elements featuring whistling sound. It was released on October 4, 2022, by SM Entertainment while distributed by Dreamus, along with an accompanying music video.

== Background and release ==
On September 6, 2022, SM Entertainment announced that Seulgi would be releasing her first solo album in October 2022. On September 13, it was announced that she will be releasing her first extended play titled 28 Reasons on October 4. On September 19, a schedule poster was released. On September 26, a mood sampler was released through Red Velvet's social media accounts. The remixes EP, including her song from the same parent EP "Los Angeles", by ScreaM Records, called iScreaM Vol. 22: 28 Reasons / Los Angeles Remixes, was released on March 17, 2023.

== Composition ==
"28 Reasons" was composed by Sean Kennedy, Johan Fransson, Henrik Goranson, Yoo Young-jin and Kriz, while the lyrics were written by Jeon Ji-eun, January 8th, Jo Yoon-kyung, and Yoo. Yoo, Fransson, Goranson and IMLAY took part for the arrangement. The song is composed in the key of F minor with a tempo of 122 beats per minute.

Musically, the song was described as a dance-pop track characterized by groovy and heavy bass sounds and featuring a whistling sound. Lyrically, it depict a character who is both "good and evil" and the way this affects the relationship they're in. In the lyrics, Seulgi show off "the menacing" side of herself, where she enjoys the power she has to "crush" those who are attracted to her or obsessed with her.

== Promotion ==
The promotion for the single started with Mnet's M Countdown on October 6, followed by KBS2TV's Music Bank on the 7th, MBC's Show! Music Core, and SBS's Inkigayo on the 9th, followed by a performance and an interview on JTBC's show named Music Universe K-909.

== Music video and concept ==
On September 13, a trailer video was released. On October 3, a music video teaser was released. The following day the official music video was released alongside the EP.

The music video and in its teaser images showed Seulgi portrays Snow White (as the good character) and Grimhilde (as the Evil character). On a press conference with "Tong Tong Culture", Seulgi explained that the dance performance and the music video concept was Inspired by the Marvel Universe character, Wanda Maximoff, known as the Scarlet Witch, she, furthermore, explained: "There are a lot of gorgeous hand movements. There are many grotesque and manipulative choreography with the dancers so that you can look like a witch". She added: "It was filmed outside of England. It captured the old-fashioned and cool feeling well. Snow White and the Queen were my concept and motif this time. Snow White, who is not too good, and the Queen who is not too evil".

== Track listing ==
- Digital download / streaming (iScreaM Vol. 22: 28 Reasons / Los Angeles Remixes)
1. "28 Reasons" (Cifika remix) – 3:54
2. "28 Reasons" (Loozbone remix) – 4:34
3. "Los Angeles" (Moksi remix) – 2:59

== Credits and personnel ==
Credits adapted from album's liner notes.

Studio

- SM Booming System – recording, digital editing, mixing
- SM Big Shot Studio – recording
- doobdoob Studio – digital editing
- Sonic Korea – mastering

Personnel

- SM Entertainment – executive producer
- Lee Soo-man – producer
- Lee Sung-soo – production director, executive supervisor
- Tak Young-jun – executive supervisor
- Seulgi – vocals
- Jo Yoon-kyung – lyrics
- January 8th – lyrics
  - Jeon Ji-eun – lyrics
- Yoo Young-jin – producer, lyrics, composition, arrangement, vocal directing, background vocals, recording, digital editing, mixing, music and sound supervisor
- Henrik Goranson – composition, arrangement
- Johan Fransson – composition, arrangement
- Sean Kennedy – composition
- Kriz – composition, background vocals
- IMLAY – arrangement
- Lee Min-kyu – recording
- Eugene Kwon – digital editing
- Jeon Hoon – mastering
- Shin Soo-min – mastering assistant

== Charts ==
=== Weekly charts ===
Weekly chart performance for "28 Reasons"
Chart (2022)	Peak position
Singapore Regional (RIAS)	18
South Korea (Circle)	113
Vietnam (Vietnam Hot 100)	48

=== Monthly charts ===
Monthly chart performance for "28 Reasons"
Chart (2022)	Position
South Korea (Circle)	135

== Release history ==
Release dates and formats for "28 Reasons"
Region	Date	Format(s)	Version	Label(s)	Ref.
Various	October 4, 2022	Digital download; streaming	Original	SM	
Various	March 17, 2023	Digital download; streaming	Remix	SM; ScreaM	
