= Cool Kids (TV program) =

Korean television program

- Promotional poster
- Hangul: 요즘애들
- Lit.: Kids These Days
- RR: Yojeumaedeul
- MR: Yojŭmaedŭl
- Genre: Talk show
- Starring: Current: Yoo Jae-suk; Kim Shin-young; Ahn Jung-hwan; Haon; Kwanghee Former: Han Hyun-min; Seulgi (Red Velvet)
- Country of origin: South Korea
- Original language: Korean
- No. of seasons: 1
- No. of episodes: 22

Production
- Executive producers: Yoon Hyun-joon; Lee Chang-woo
- Production location: South Korea
- Running time: 90 minutes

Original release
- Network: JTBC
- Release: December 2, 2018 – May 12, 2019

Cool Kids (Korean: 요즘애들; RR: Yojeumaedeul) is a South Korean variety show program on JTBC starring Yoo Jae-suk, Kim Shin-young, Ahn Jung-hwan, Haon and Kwanghee.

The show aired from December 2, 2018. It was broadcast by JTBC on Sundays at 23:20 (KST) and ended on May 12, 2019.

== Synopsis ==
The show welcomes the kids to personally create their videos and submit to the show starting from November 19, 2018.

From episode 1 to 6, the 6 casts will split into three teams. Afterwards, all the team members will watch the selected 10 applicants' videos that kids personally created to review during the studio recording. Later on, each team will choose one kid team that they want to spend the day with and give them a call. The casts will meet the kids the week after the call.

Starting from episode 7 to 10, the grouping method changes and all the cast move in a group rather than splitting into 3 groups. In addition, the casts only watch 2 or 3 applicants' videos instead of the usual 10. From there, they will only choose 1 kid team instead of 3. They will also meet them right away after calling the chosen kids instead of meeting them the week after the call.

From episode 11 to 15, the casts will only watch 2 applicants' videos and vote. They will meet the chosen kid(s) a week later so that the kid(s) is/are prepared.

From episode 16, the production team will decide ahead of filming day on which kid(s) to visit.

== Casts ==
Name	Episodes
Han Hyun-min	1 – 6
Red Velvet's Seulgi	1 – 6
Yoo Jae-suk	1 – 22
Kim Shin-young	1 – 22
Ahn Jung-hwan	1 – 22
Haon	1 – 22
Kwanghee	10 – 22

== Changes in Casts ==
On episode 7, the 4 MCs announced that Hyun-min and Seulgi had officially left the show.

On episode 9, it was announced that Kwanghee will officially be joining the remaining cast.

== Groups ==
Episode(s)	Groups					
Episode(s)	A		B		C	
Episode(s)	Cast(s)	Kid(s)	Cast(s)	Kid(s)	Cast(s)	Kid(s)
1 – 3	Haon; Ahn Jung-hwan	Y.N.D. club	Kim Shin-young; Seulgi	Im Siblings	Yoo Jae-suk; Han Hyun-min	Jang Joon-young
4 – 6	Haon; Ahn Jung-hwan	Kwon Oh-joon	Yoo Jae-suk; Seulgi	Live Together	Kim Shin-young; Han Hyun-min	Mimi School
Episode(s)	Cast(s)	Kid(s)				
7	Haon; Ahn Jung-hwan; Kim Shin-young; Yoo Jae-suk	Moon Esther				
8	Haon; Ahn Jung-hwan; Kim Shin-young; Yoo Jae-suk	Song Young-jin				
9	Haon; Ahn Jung-hwan; Kim Shin-young; Yoo Jae-suk	Park Chan-hoo				
10	Haon; Ahn Jung-hwan; Kim Shin-young; Yoo Jae-suk; Kwanghee	Seong Ho-seok, Lim Jong-wook & Ryu Min-woo (Medical students of Seoul National University (SNU) College of Medicine)				
11	Haon; Ahn Jung-hwan; Kim Shin-young; Yoo Jae-suk; Kwanghee	Han Yoo-ran				
12	Haon; Ahn Jung-hwan; Kim Shin-young; Yoo Jae-suk; Kwanghee	Yang Jin-soo				
13	Haon; Ahn Jung-hwan; Kim Shin-young; Yoo Jae-suk	Yun Hyun-bin & Yun Soo-bin				
14	Haon; Ahn Jung-hwan; Kim Shin-young; Yoo Jae-suk; Kwanghee	Lee Sun-jin, Park Se-jin, Kim Jong-woo & Cho Chae-rin (Korea National University of Arts, School of Dance students)				
15	Haon; Ahn Jung-hwan; Kim Shin-young; Yoo Jae-suk; Kwanghee	Ahn Baek-rin, Park Yeon & Jun Bum-sun (Vegan)				
16	Haon; Ahn Jung-hwan; Kim Shin-young; Yoo Jae-suk; Kwanghee	Park Hong-sun (Military Maniac)		Kim Min-chan (Youngest Drone Racing Champion)		
17	Haon; Ahn Jung-hwan; Kim Shin-young; Yoo Jae-suk	Hong San (Funeral Portrait Photographer)				
18	Haon; Ahn Jung-hwan; Kim Shin-young; Yoo Jae-suk; Kwanghee	Jung Gye-won (International Memory Master)				
19	Haon; Ahn Jung-hwan; Kim Shin-young; Yoo Jae-suk; Kwanghee	Kim Yong-wan, Ahn Dae-hyun & Yoo Sung-young				
20	Haon; Ahn Jung-hwan; Kim Shin-young; Yoo Jae-suk	Kim Min-ji, Kim Su-jin, Yang Tae-yi & Kim Hye-rin (Korean National Female Curling Team)				
21	Ahn Jung-hwan; Yoo Jae-suk; Kwanghee	Ni Ju, Jeon Woo-young, Yoon Ji-a, Lee Hye-rim, Lee Gi-hyun & Jeon Ho-young (Vegetable Orchestra)			Lee Sol Bit Na, Kim Ye-ji, Kim Se-in, Kwon Hae-won & Kim Hyun-gi (Circus)	
22	Ahn Jung-hwan; Kim Shin-young; Yoo Jae-suk; Kwanghee	Cha Jun-hwan (National Figure Skater)				

== Guests ==
Episode(s)	Name	Note(s)
8	Kwanghee	
9	Ahn Young-mi	
9	Jang Sung-kyu	
10	Kim Hye-yoon	
10	Chani (SF9)	
13	Shin Bong-sun	
13	Nam Chang-hee	
15	Moon Se-yoon	
17	Haha	
19	Jo-bin (Norazo)	
19	Jang Sung-kyu	
20	Yang Se-hyung	
20	Solbi	
21	Lee Su-geun	
22	Yunho (TVXQ)	

== Ratings ==
=== Season 1 ===
List of ratings in 2018–2019 (Episodes 1–present)

- Ratings listed below are the individual corner ratings of Cool Kids. (Note: Individual corner ratings do not include commercial time, which regular ratings include.)
- In the ratings below, the highest rating for the show will be in red and the lowest rating for the show will be in blue each year.

Ep. #	Original Airdate	AGB Nielsen Ratings
1	December 2, 2018	0.941%
2	December 9, 2018	1.117%
3	December 16, 2018	0.910%
4	December 23, 2018	1.462%
5	January 6, 2019 (Note: The episode was pushed back a week due to the New Year special programme.)	1.515%
6	January 13, 2019	1.369%
7	January 20, 2019	1.646%
8	January 27, 2019	1.467%
9	February 10, 2019 (Note: The episode was pushed back a week due to the Lunar New Year special programme.)	1.519%
10	February 17, 2019	2.296%
11	February 24, 2019	1.774%
12	March 3, 2019	0.921%
13	March 10, 2019	1.500%
14	March 17, 2019	0.954%
15	March 24, 2019	1.324%
16	March 31, 2019	0.838%
17	April 7, 2019	0.6%
18	April 14, 2019	1.253%
19	April 21, 2019	0.915%
20	April 28, 2019	1.011%
21	May 5, 2019	0.795%
22	May 12, 2019	1.099%
