= Fu Bao (giant panda) =

Female giant panda (born 2020)

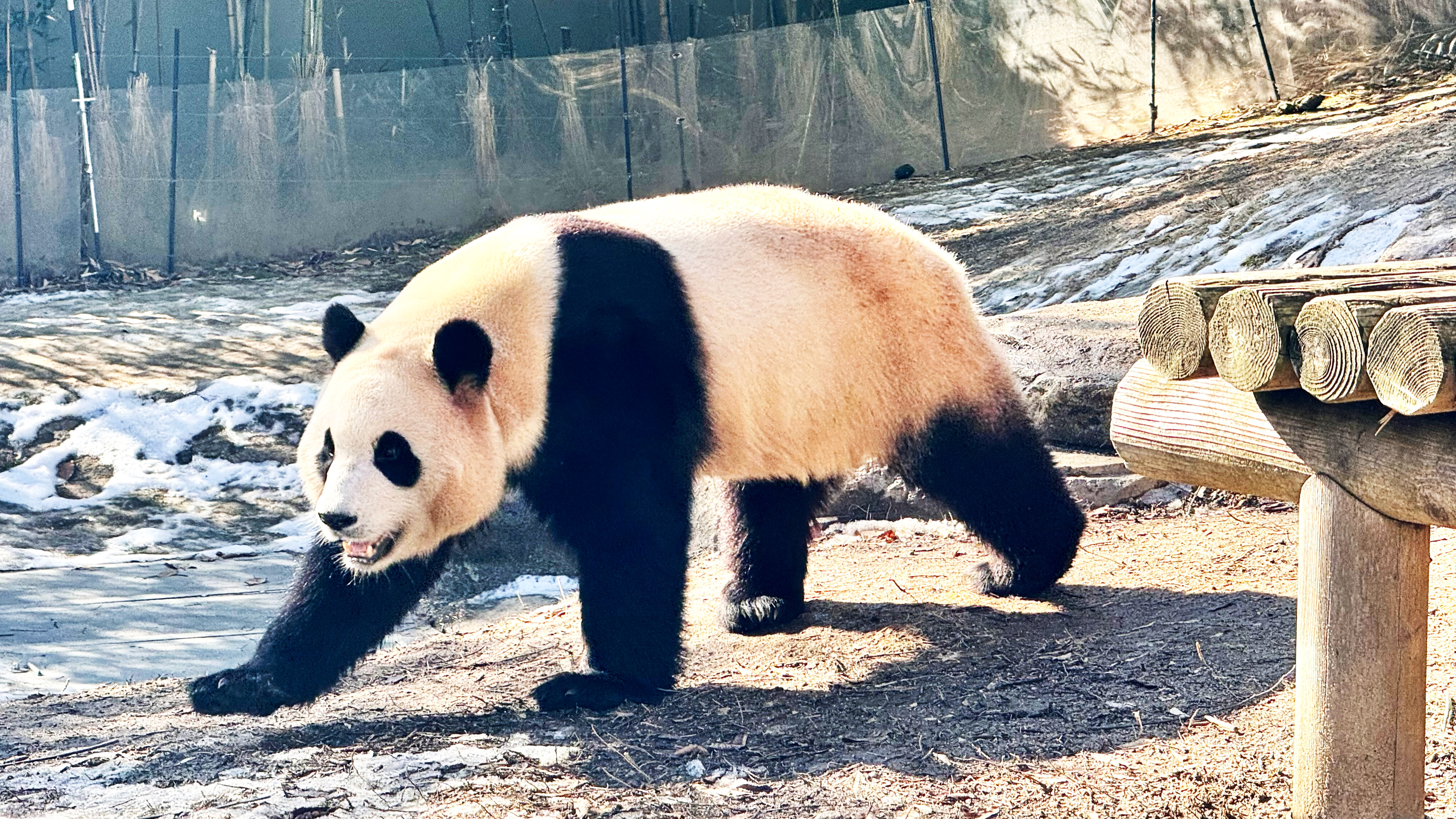
- Fu Bao in 2024
- Species: Giant panda
- Sex: Female
- Born: July 20, 2020 (age 6); South Korea
- Parents: Ai Bao and Le Bao

Fu Bao (Chinese: 福宝; pinyin: Fú bǎo, Korean: 푸바오, born July 20, 2020) is the first naturally born giant panda in South Korea. She was born to parents Ai Bao and Le Bao at the Everland theme park. She currently resides at the Shenshuping giant panda base in China.

== Life ==
Fu Bao was born in July 2020 to parents Ai Bao and Le Bao, who subsequently produced twin female cubs, Rui Bao and Hui Bao in 2023, the first twin pandas to be born in South Korea, and another female cub. Fu Bao's name means "lucky treasure". She became popular amongst South Korean netizens during the COVID-19 pandemic and her presence also doubled the number of visitors to Everland's Panda World.

Like all cubs born to pairs loaned from China, Fu Bao was to be relocated to China within a span of 4 years. She left for China's Shensuping Conservatory on April 3, 2024. 6,000 people attended a "farewell ceremony" to see her out of the country. Fu Bao's arrival at the Chengdu Shuangliu International Airport was met with concern by South Korean and Chinese netizens, who criticized the Chinese reporters for using flash cameras and not wearing facemasks, and an official for reaching into her cage and touching her without gloves. In response to the claims, the China Conservation and Research Center for the Giant Panda and Fu Bao's former South Korean keeper, Kang Cheol-won, re-assured fans that Fu Bao was safe and clarified that the officials had sanitized their hands before touching her. Kang also expressed his confidence in the Chinese zookeepers.

While Fu Bao was in China, some visitors alleged that the panda was being mistreated, pointing out signs such as fur loss; rumors also spread that the bear was being used in "unofficial petting zoo experiences." One group of fans took out a full-page ad in The New York Times and a billboard in Times Square, mentioning those rumors and urging the conservatory to improve her living conditions, be transparent with updates about her health, and keep unauthorized people from coming near the bear or touching her. At a press conference in June, the China Conservation and Research Center said that Fu Bao's hair loss was normal in giant pandas and that panda keepers, veterinarians, and a nutritionist were monitoring her health.

In late 2024, the conservatory put Fu Bao into rehabilitation after she was seen trembling, according to the China Conservation and Research Center for the Giant Panda. She was in isolation for four months and re-introduced into public view in March 2025.

Fu Bao is the subject of a documentary titled My Dearest Fu Bao which chronicles her keepers, Song Young-gwan and Kang Cheol-won (who have been dubbed "panda grandfathers"), and their efforts to care for her.

== See also ==
- List of individual giant pandas
