= List of songs written by Jonghyun =

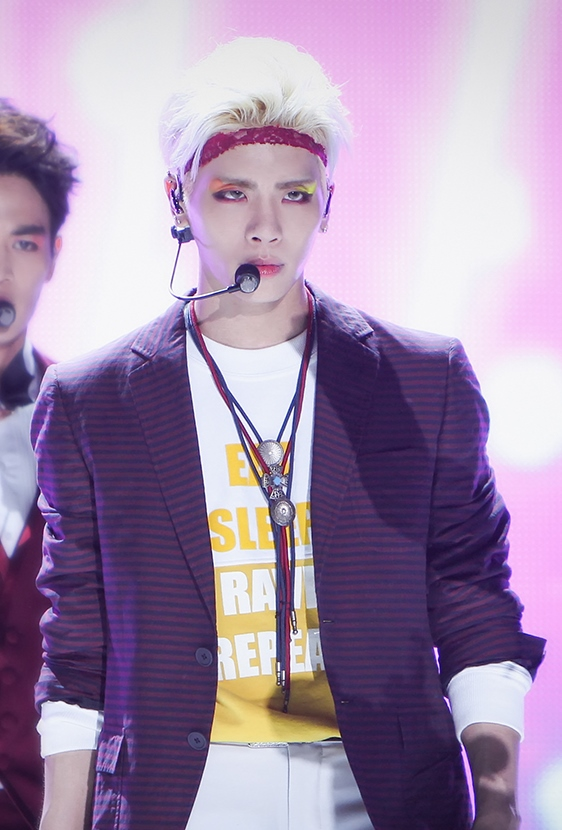
Jonghyun at the Korea Music Festival in Sokcho in August 2015

South Korean singer-songwriter Kim Jong-hyun (most often credited as Jonghyun) has written 80 songs, including music for his solo career, his band, and for other artists. He began his musical career in 2008 as a member of the boy band Shinee and later formed the ballad group SM the Ballad. Jonghyun made his debut as a songwriter with Shinee's 2009 single "Juliette", which was featured on the extended play Romeo. He was inspired by the 1968 film Romeo and Juliet, stating that he deliberately chose "a story which everyone can identify with". He began making frequent contributions to Shinee's musical output thereafter. Most notably, in 2015, he penned the lyrics to "View", the lead single from Shinee's fourth studio album, Odd. The song peaked at number one on South Korea's Gaon Digital Chart and received nominations from the Mnet Asian Music Awards and the Golden Disc Awards. Jonghyun garnered acclaim for the lyrics, which were inspired by synesthesia.

In February 2014, Jonghyun started a songwriting corner titled "The Man Who Composes" on his MBC FM4U midnight radio show, Blue Night, where he wrote songs based on stories submitted by listeners. In 2015, he debuted as a solo artist with the release of the self-composed song "Déjà-Boo", accompanied by his first extended play, Base. Jonghyun was credited on every song on the EP, which reached number one on the Gaon Album Chart and Billboard World Albums and won an Album Bonsang at the Golden Disc Awards. Later that year, he released his first compilation album, Story Op.1, consisting entirely of songs he had previously written for his radio show. This was followed by his first studio album, She Is (2016), and second compilation album, Story Op.2 (2017). Jonghyun described the Story Op albums as showcasing a side that is "more ordinary and human", as opposed to his other work that presents an "idealized" version of himself. His final album, Poet | Artist (2018), was released posthumously following his suicide on December 18, 2017. His solo music is largely co-written with his composition team, WeFreaky.

In addition to his solo career and his work with Shinee, Jonghyun has written several songs for other artists. In 2013, Jonghyun wrote "A Gloomy Clock"; the song was gifted to his friend IU after she expressed interest in it. It was included on her album, Modern Times, with Jonghyun as a featured artist. Jonghyun wrote songs for bandmate Taemin and labelmates Exo, as well as artists such as Son Dam-bi and Lim Kim. He was invited by Epik High rapper Tablo to write a song for Lee Hi's 2016 album Seoulite. The resulting single, "Breathe", was inspired by Lee's difficulties with breathing due to panic disorder.

Jonghyun became active as a songwriter at a time when it was uncommon for idols to do so. He has been lauded as one of the few idols to differentiate himself from the "mass-produced" nature of the K-pop industry, owing to his artistry and songwriting prowess.

== Songs ==
Key
†	Indicates single release

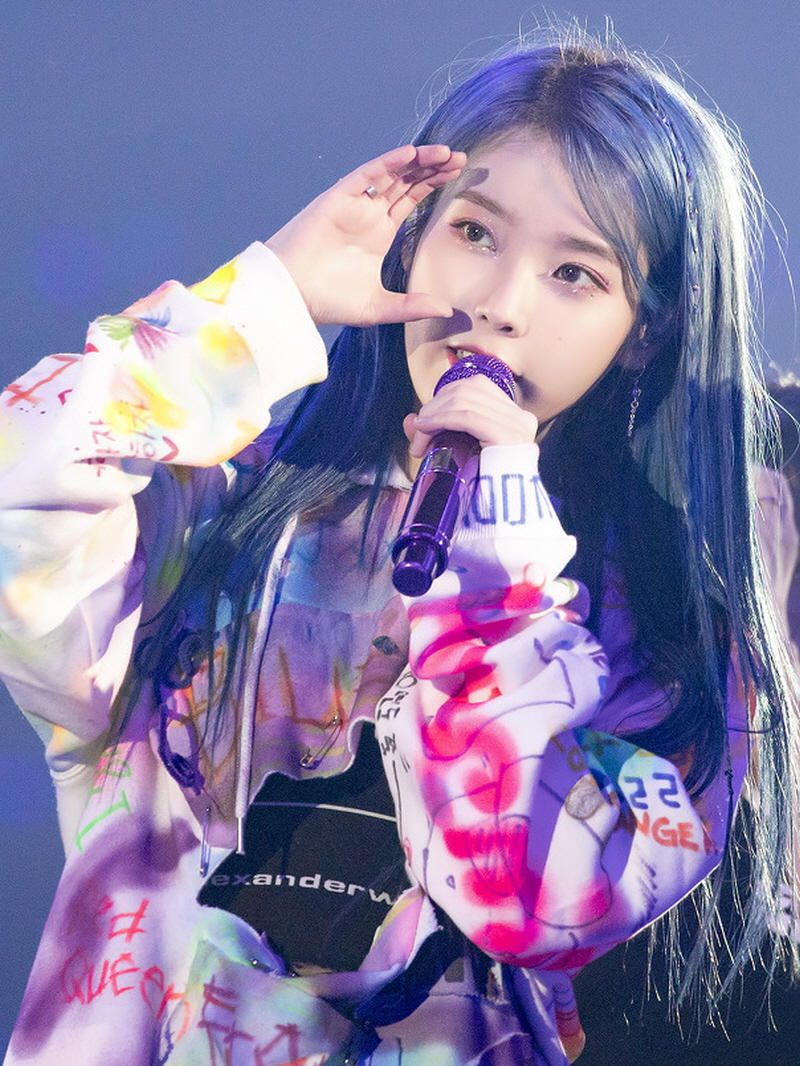
Jonghyun wrote IU's 2013 song "A Gloomy Clock", which he also features on.

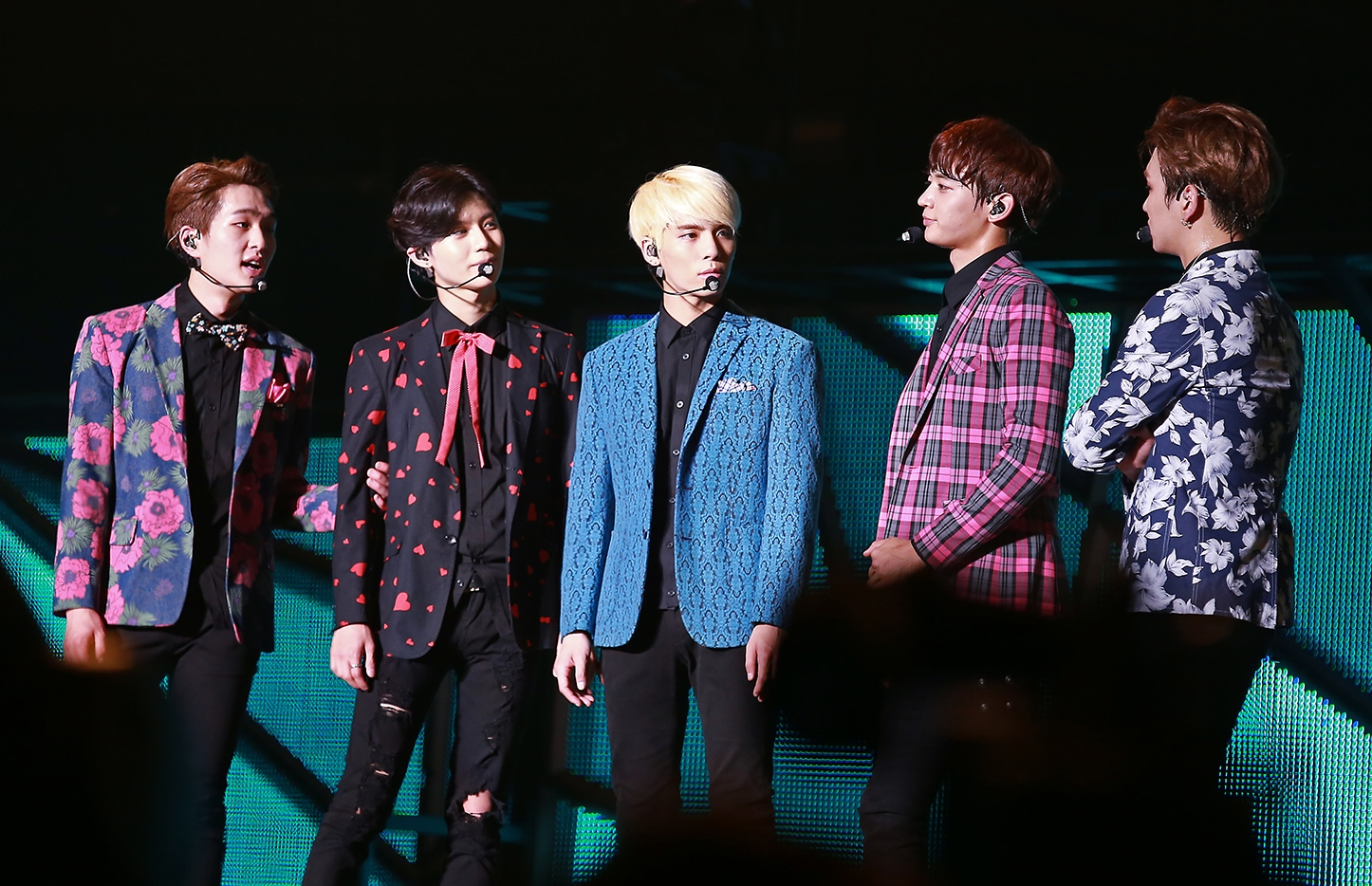
Jonghyun is a member of the boy band Shinee, whom he has written numerous songs for.

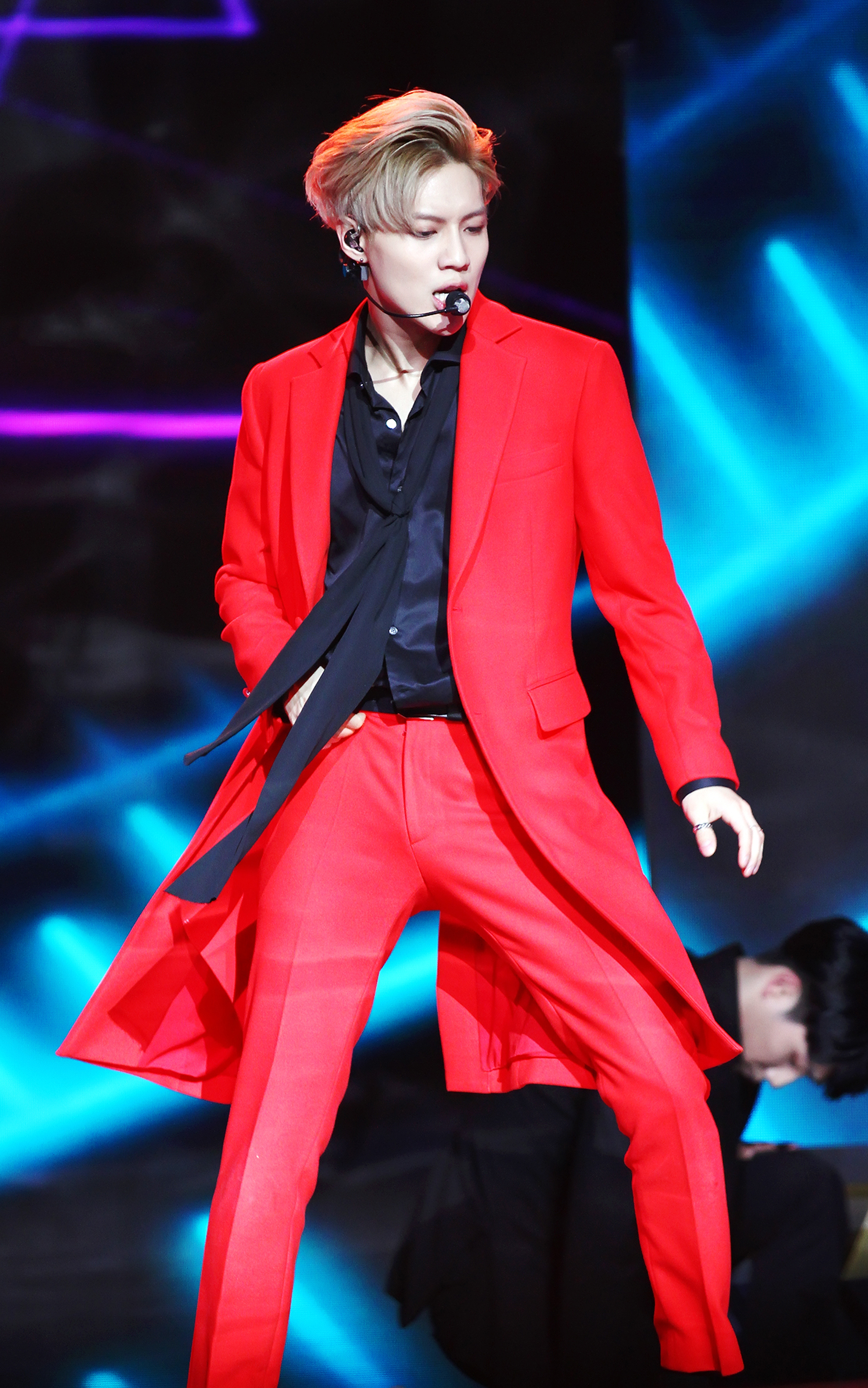
Jonghyun wrote the songs "Already" and "Pretty Boy" for fellow Shinee member Taemin.

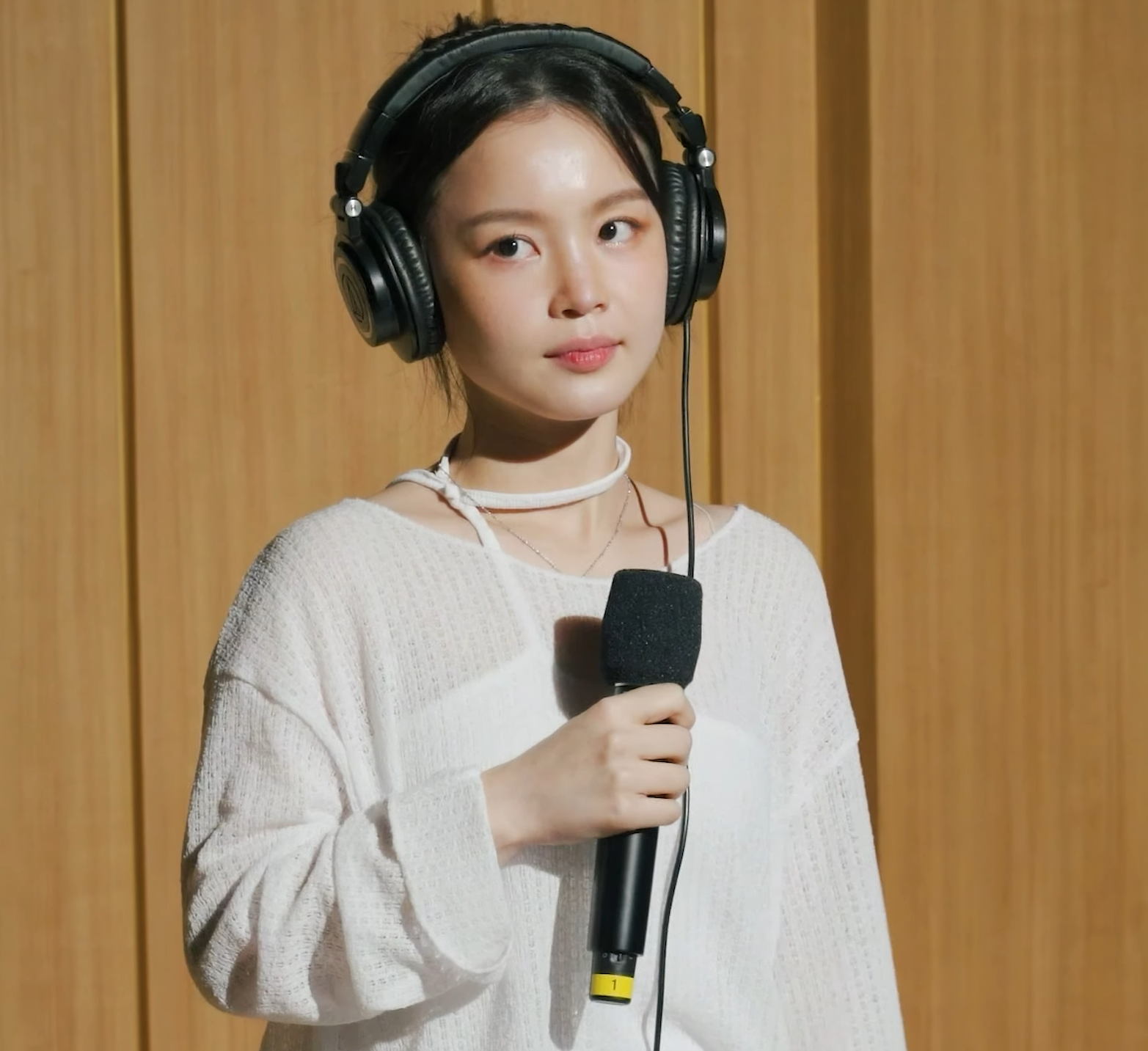
Jonghyun wrote the song "Breathe", which was released as the lead single from Lee Hi's 2016 album Seoulite.

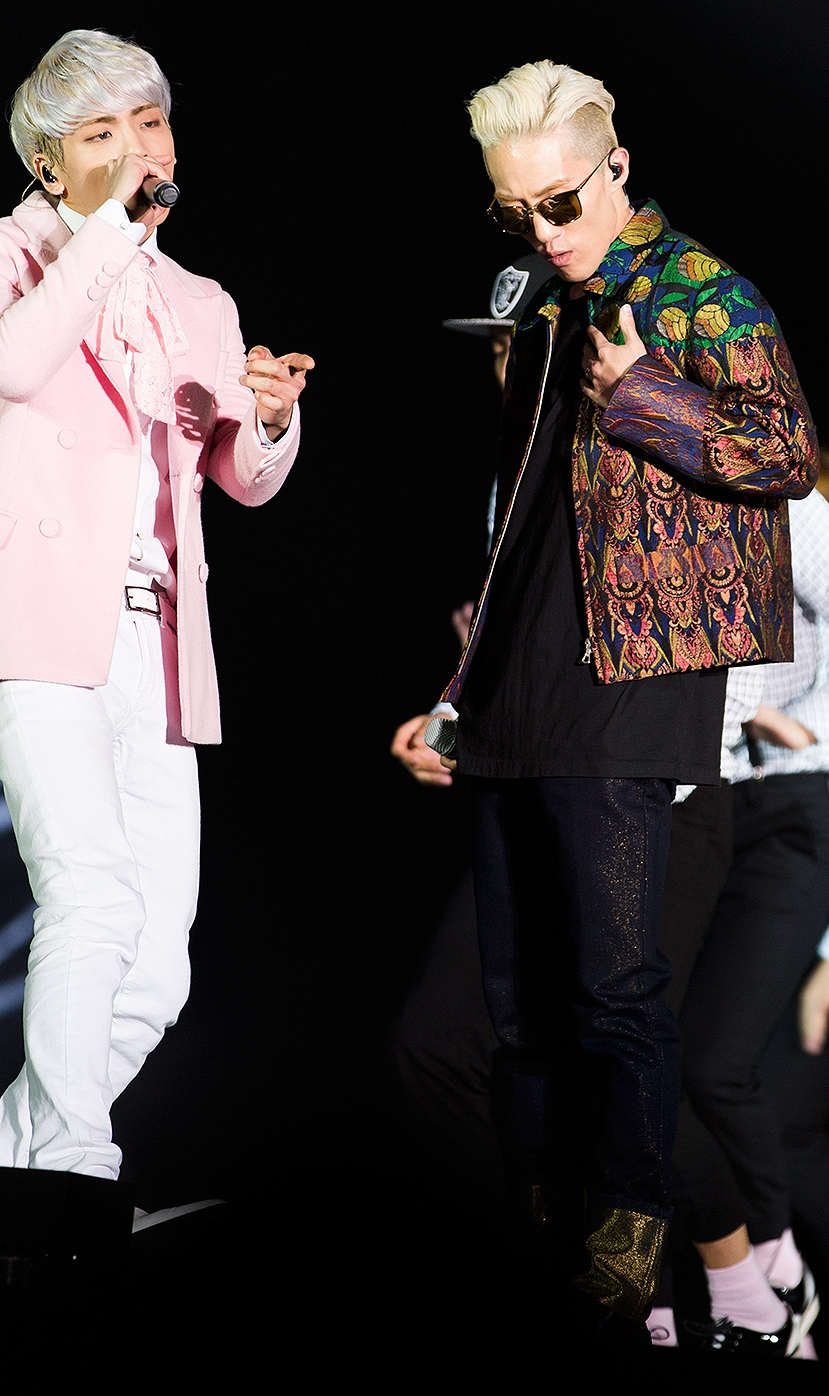
Jonghyun collaborated with Zion.T on "Déjà-Boo", recorded for Jonghyun's debut solo EP, Base (2015).

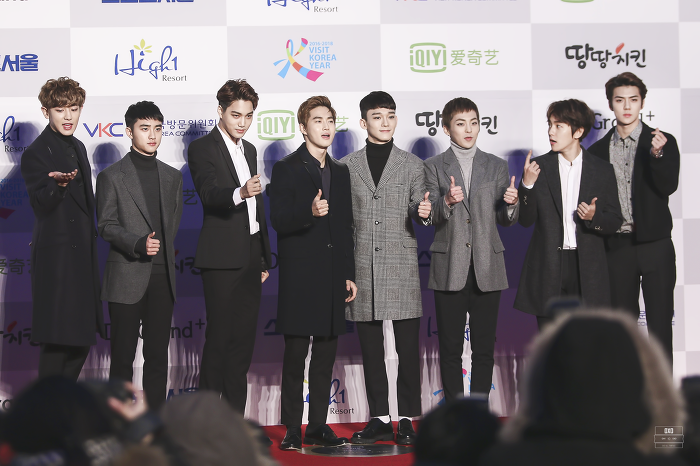
Jonghyun wrote "Playboy" (2015) for labelmates Exo.

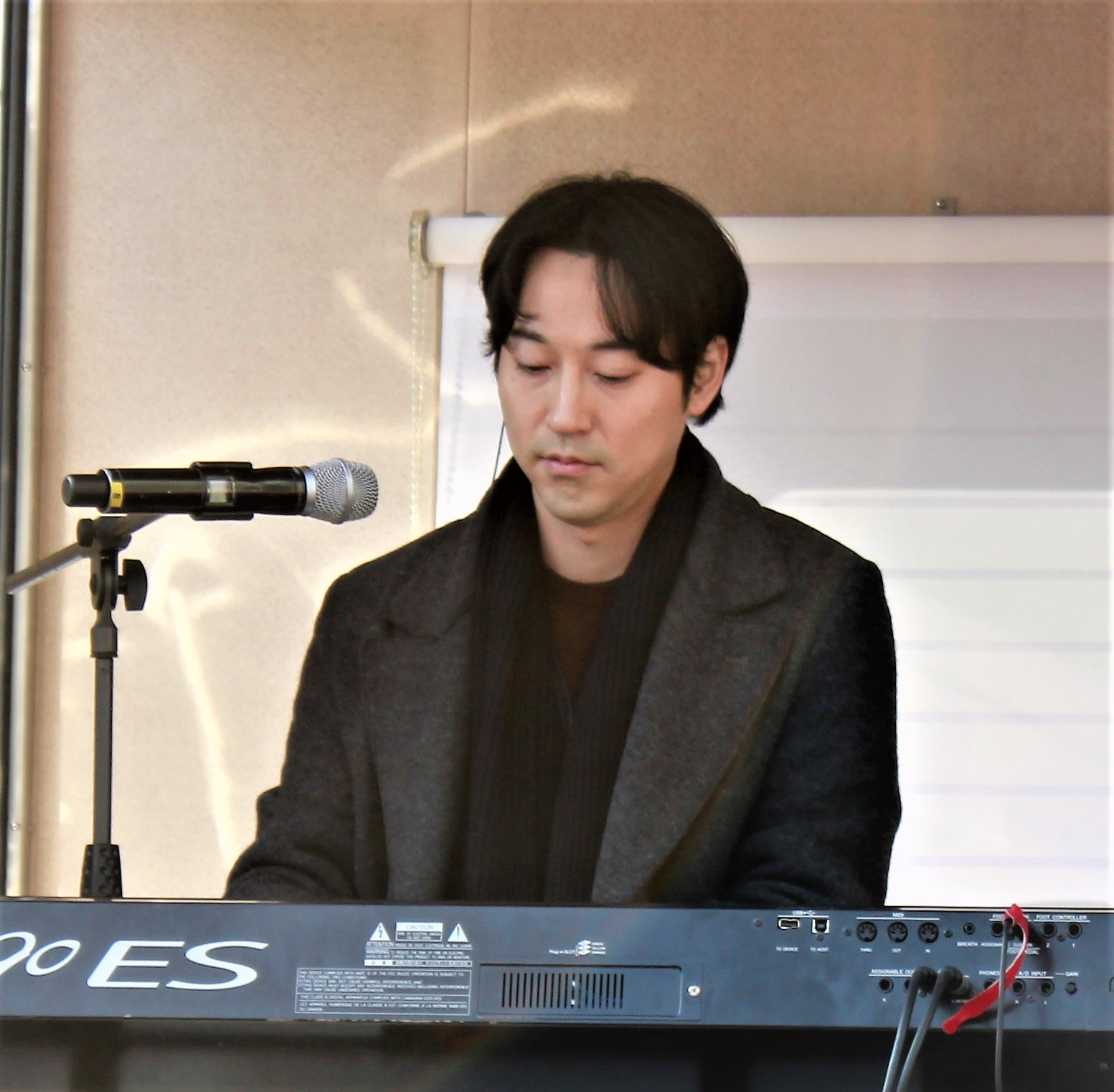
Jonghyun co-wrote Shinee's 2013 song "Selene 6.23" with the classical pianist Yiruma.

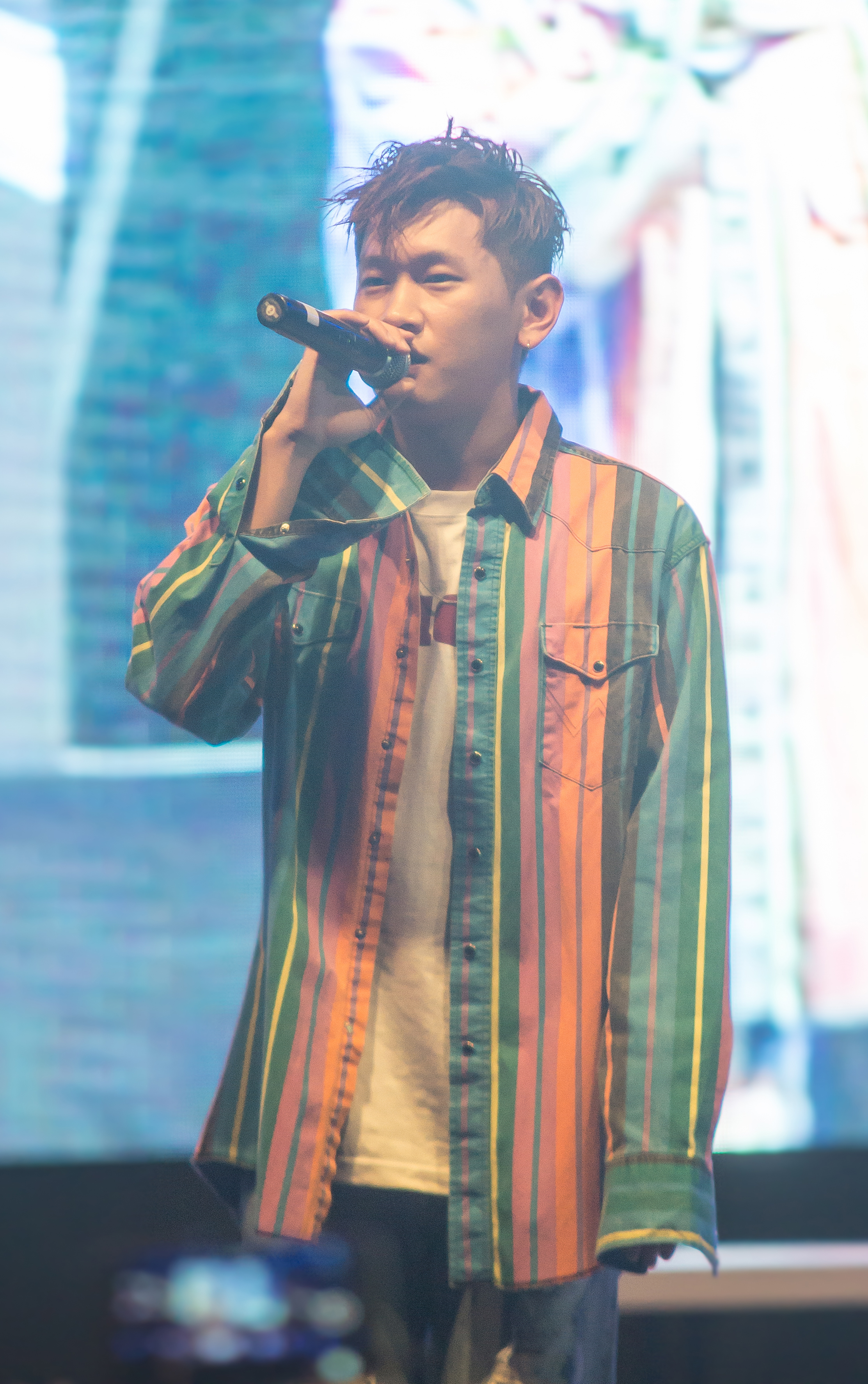
"She Is", the lead single from Jonghyun's 2016 studio album of the same name, was co-written with Crush.

Name of song, featured performers, writer(s), original release, and year of release
Song	Artist(s)	Writer(s)	Album	Year	Ref.
"02:34"	Jonghyun	Jonghyun; WeFreaky; Heuktae	Story Op.1	2015	
"1000"	Jonghyun	Jonghyun; WeFreaky	Story Op.2	2015	
"A Gloomy Clock" (우울시계; Uulsigye)	IU (featuring Jonghyun)	Jonghyun	Modern Times	2013	
"Aewol" (애월; 愛月)	Jonghyun (with Jung Joon-young)	Jonghyun; Jung Joon-young	Monthly Live Connection	2015	
"Alarm Clock" (알람시계; Allamsigye)	Shinee	Jonghyun; Minho; Niara Scarlett; Philippe-Marc Anquetil; Christopher Lee-Joe; Iain James	Sherlock	2012	
"Already" (벌써; Beolsseo)	Taemin	Jonghyun; Teddy Riley; Lee Hyun-seung; DOM; Daniel Obi Klein	Press It	2016	
"Aurora"	Jonghyun	Jonghyun; Deez	She Is	2016	
"Beautiful Tonight" (시간이 늦었어; Sigani neujeosseo)	Jonghyun	Jonghyun; Sojin	Base	2015	
"Before Our Spring" † (우린 봄이 오기 전에; Urin bomi ogi jeone)	Jonghyun	Jonghyun; WeFreaky	Poet | Artist	2018	
"Better Off" (버리고 가; Beorigo ga)	Shinee	Jonghyun; Minho; Bardur Haberg; Jenson David Aubrey Vaughan	The Misconceptions of Us	2013	
"Blinking Game" (눈싸움; Nunssaum)	Jonghyun	Jonghyun; WeFreaky; E-Nail	Story Op.2	2017	
"Breathe" † (한숨; Hansum)	Lee Hi	Jonghyun; WeFreaky	Seoulite	2016	
"Breathe" (Japanese version)	Lee Hi	Jonghyun; WeFreaky	Lee Hi Japan Debut Album	2018	
"Chocolate"	Shinee	Yankie; Jonghyun; Andreas Öberg; Simon Janlöv	Married to the Music	2015	
"Cocktail"	Jonghyun	Jonghyun; Bryan-Michael Cox; Clifford Henson	She Is	2016	
"Crazy (Guilty Pleasure)" †	Jonghyun (featuring Iron)	Jonghyun; Iron; Uwe Fahrenkrog-Petersen; Jean Beauvoir; Anne Judith Wik; Robin Jenssen; Martin Mulholland	Base	2015	
"Dangerous (Medusa II)"	Shinee	Jo Yoon-kyung; Jonghyun; Teddy Riley; Red Rocket; Tesung Kim; Andrew Choi	Why So Serious? – The Misconceptions of Me	2013	
"Déjà-Boo" † (데자-부; Deja-bu)	Jonghyun (featuring Zion.T)	Jonghyun; Zion.T; WeFreaky	Base	2015	
"Diphylleia Grayi" (산하엽; Sanhayeop)	Jonghyun	Jonghyun; WeFreaky	Story Op.1	2015	
"Don't Stop"	Shinee	Jonghyun; Minho; Key; The Stereotypes; Micah Powell; Maxx Song	1 of 1	2016	
"Dress Up"	Jonghyun	Jonghyun; LDN Noise	She Is	2016	
"Elevator" (엘리베이터; Ellibeiteo)	Jonghyun	Jonghyun; WeFreaky	Story Op.2	2017	
"End of a Day" † (하루의 끝; Haruui kkeut)	Jonghyun	Jonghyun; WeFreaky	Story Op.1	2015	
"Fine" (그래도 되지 않아?; Geuraedo doeji ana?)	Jonghyun	Jonghyun; WeFreaky; Heuktae	Story Op.1	2015	
"Fireplace" (벽난로; Byeongnallo)	Jonghyun	Jonghyun; WeFreaky; Score	Story Op.2	2017	
"Fortune Cookie" (포춘쿠키; Pochunkuki)	Jonghyun	Jonghyun; Oh Joon-hyuk	Base	2015	
"Grease" (기름때; Gireumttae)	Jonghyun	Jonghyun; Jake K.	Poet | Artist	2018	
"Hallelujah" (할렐루야; Hallelluya)	Jonghyun	Jonghyun; Wheesung; Im Gwang-ok; Martin Mulholland; Nermin Harambasic	Base	2015	
"Happy Birthday"	Jonghyun	Jonghyun; WeFreaky	Story Op.1	2015	
"#Hashtag" (와플; Wapeul)	Jonghyun	Jonghyun; Imlay; Jin Soh	Poet | Artist	2018	
"Honesty" (늘 그자리에; Neul geujarie)	Shinee	Jonghyun; Minho; Brandon Fraley	Sherlock	2012	
"I'm So Curious" (어떤 기분이 들까; Eotteon gibuni deulkka)	Jonghyun	Jonghyun; Imlay; Jin Suk Choi	Poet | Artist	2018	
"I'm Sorry" (미안해; Mianhae)	Jonghyun	Jonghyun; WeFreaky	Story Op.1	2015	
"Inspiration" †	Jonghyun	Jonghyun; Imlay	SM Station Season 1	2016	
"It Must Be Autumn" (가을이긴 한가; Gaeurigin hanga)	Jonghyun (with Go Young-bae)	Jonghyun; Go Young-bae	Monthly Live Connection	2015	
"Juliette" †	Shinee	Jonghyun; Minho; Mikkel Remee Sigvardt; Jay Sean; Mich Hansen; Joseph Belmaati	Romeo	2009	
"Just Chill" (멍하니 있어; Meonghani isseo)	Jonghyun	Jonghyun; WeFreaky; Imlay	Story Op.2	2017	
"Kkaman Bam Pureun Bam" (까만 밤 푸른 밤)	Jonghyun	Jonghyun; WeFreaky	—N/a (Note: Theme song for Jonghyun's radio show MBC Blue Night)	2014	
"Let Me Out" (놓아줘; Noajwo)	Jonghyun	Jonghyun; WeFreaky; Score	Story Op.2	2017	
"Like You"	Jonghyun	Jonghyun; WeFreaky	Story Op.1	2015	
"Lonely" †	Jonghyun (featuring Taeyeon)	Jonghyun; WeFreaky; MonoTree; Imlay	Story Op.2	2017	
"Love Belt"	Jonghyun (featuring Younha)	Jonghyun; WeFreaky	Base	2015	
"Love Is"	Jonghyun	Jonghyun; Sojin	—N/a	2014	
"Love is So Nice"	Jonghyun	Jonghyun; WeFreaky; Imlay	Story Op.2	2017	
"Maybe Tomorrow" (내일쯤; Naeiljjeum)	Jonghyun	Jonghyun; WeFreaky	Story Op.1	2015	
"Mono-Drama" (일인극; Iringeuk)	Jonghyun	Jonghyun; The Underdogs; Eric Dawkins	Base	2015	
"Moon"	Jonghyun	Jonghyun; LDN Noise; Adrian McKinnon	She Is	2016	
"Neon"	Jonghyun	Jonghyun; Deez	Base	2015	
"No More"	Lim Kim	Jonghyun; WeFreaky; Chase	Simple Mind	2015	
"Obsession" (욕; Yok)	Shinee	Jonghyun; Minho; John Ho; Sean Alexander; Jimmy Burney	Lucifer	2010	
"Odd Eye"	Shinee	Jonghyun; Key; Jonathan Yip; Jeremy Reeves; Ray Romulus; Ray McCullough	Odd	2015	
"Oneulgwa Naeil" (오늘과 내일)	Jonghyun	Jonghyun; Gray	—N/a	2014	
"Only One You Need" (환상통; Hwansangtong)	Jonghyun	Jonghyun; Blizman; Christian Parris; Daniel Klein; Kendrick Dean	Poet | Artist	2018	
"Orbit" (우주가 있어; Ujuga isseo)	Jonghyun	Jonghyun; WeFreaky; Coach & Sendo	She Is	2016	
"Orgel" (오르골; Oreugol)	Shinee	Jonghyun; Minho; Key; Iain James; Christopher Lee-Joe; Mikko Paavola; Philipe-Marc Anquetil	Why So Serious? – The Misconceptions of Me	2013	
"Our Season" (따뜻한 겨울; Ttatteutan gyeoul)	Jonghyun	Jonghyun; WeFreaky; Shin Hyun-jin	Story Op.2	2017	
"Playboy"	Exo	Jonghyun; WeFreaky	Exodus	2015	
"Poet | Artist" †	Shinee	Jonghyun; Deez; Yunsu	Poet | Artist	2025	
"Pretty Boy"	Taemin (featuring Kai)	Jonghyun; Daniel Caesar; Ludwig Lindell; Ylva Dimberg	Ace	2014	
"Prism"	Shinee	Kim Min-jung; Jamil "Digi" Chammas; Deez; Wilbart "Vedo" McCoy III; MZMC; Otha "Vakseen" Davis III; Jonghyun	1 of 1	2016	
"Red Candle" †	Son Dam-bi	Jonghyun; WeFreaky	Non-album release	2013	
"Red"	Jonghyun	Jonghyun; WeFreaky; Ryan Kim; Chase	She Is	2016	
"Rewind"	Jonghyun	Jonghyun; Imlay	Poet | Artist	2018	
"Selene 6.23" (너와 나의 거리; Neowa naui geori)	Shinee	Jonghyun; Yiruma; 2Face; Tesung Kim	The Misconceptions of Us	2013	
"Sentimental"	Jonghyun	Jonghyun; Jake K.	Poet | Artist	2018	
"She Is" † (좋아; Joa)	Jonghyun	Jonghyun; Crush; Philtre; WeFreaky	She Is	2016	
"Shinin'" † (빛이 나; Bichi na)	Jonghyun	Jonghyun; Megatone; Score	Poet | Artist	2018	
"Shout Out" (악; Ak)	Shinee	JQ; Shinee; Misfit; Steven Lee; Drew Ryan Scott; Sean Alexander	Lucifer	2010	
"Sightseeing" (사람 구경 중; Saram gugyeong jung)	Jonghyun	Jonghyun; Jake K.; Jin Soh	Poet | Artist	2018	
"Spoiler"	Shinee	Jonghyun; Thomas Troelsen; Rufio Sandilands; Rocky Morris	Dream Girl – The Misconceptions of You	2013	
"Suit Up"	Jonghyun	Jonghyun; WeFreaky; Score	She Is	2016	
"Symptoms" (상사병; Sangsabyeong)	Shinee	Jonghyun; The Underdogs	Everybody	2013	
"U & I"	Jonghyun	Jonghyun; WeFreaky	Story Op.1	2015	
"Up & Down"	Shinee	Misfit; Jonghyun; Carl Seanté McGrier II; Kofi Owusu-Ofori; Kyuwon "Q" Kim	Lucifer	2010	
"View" †	Shinee	Jonghyun; LDN Noise; Ryan S. Jhun; Adrian McKinnon	Odd	2015	
"Where Are You" (바퀴; Bakwi)	Jonghyun	Jonghyun; WeFreaky	Story Op.2	2017	
"White T-Shirt"	Jonghyun	Jonghyun; Henrik Meinke; Jonas Kalisch; Alexsej Vlasenko; Jeremy Chacon; Ilanguaq Lumholt; Marcus Winther	She Is	2016	
"Young and Rich"	Jonghyun	Jonghyun; Imlay	—N/a	Unreleased	
"Your Voice" † (한마디; Hanmadi)	Jonghyun (with Heritage)	Lee Hwa; Ha Hyeong-joo; Park Hee-young; Jonghyun	SM Station Season 1	2016	
