= Jonghyun discography =

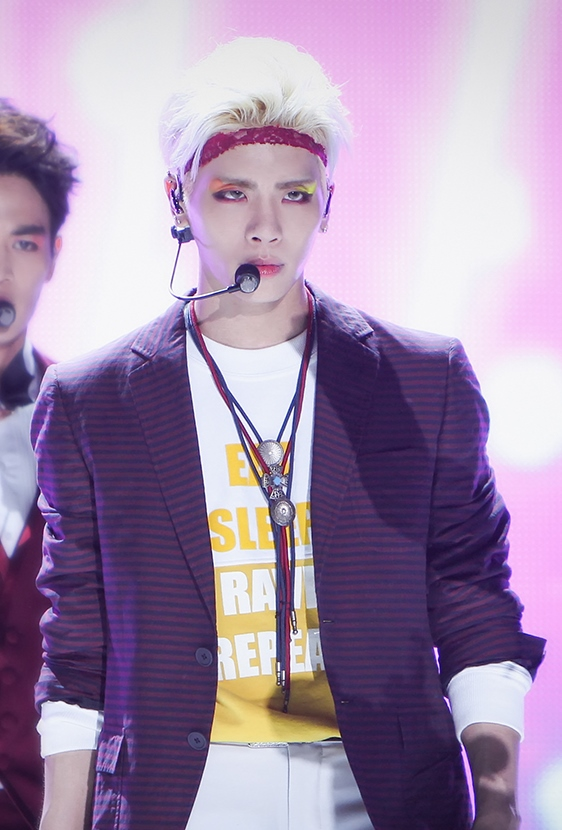
- Jonghyun at the Korea Music Festival in Sokcho, in August 2015
- Studio albums: 2
- EPs: 1
- Compilation albums: 2
- Singles: 9
- Collaborations: 3
- Soundtrack appearances: 6
- Music videos: 7

South Korean singer-songwriter Jonghyun has released two studio albums, two compilation albums, one extended play, nine singles and six soundtrack songs. Jonghyun began his career in 2008 as a member of the boy band Shinee. Early on in his career, he recorded songs for the soundtracks of various television shows, such as "So Goodbye" (2011), which sold over 500,000 downloads.

He debuted as a soloist with the release of his first extended play, Base, on January 12, 2015. The EP topped the South Korean Gaon Album Chart and spawned the number-one single "Deja-Boo". Follow-up single "Crazy (Guilty Pleasure)" also charted in the top five. His first compilation album, entitled Story Op.1, was released on September 17, 2015, reaching the top three on the Gaon Album Chart. Jonghyun released a collaboration single with the vocal group Heritage titled "Your Voice" on March 18, 2016, for the digital music project SM Station. On May 24, 2016, he released his first studio album, She Is, containing a total of nine songs. The album peaked atop the Gaon Album Chart, selling over 90,000 copies. On December 9, 2016, he released the song "Inspiration" for SM Station.

Jonghyun released his second compilation album, titled Story Op.2, on April 24, 2017. Its lead single, "Lonely", gained success following Jonghyun's suicide in December 2017, rising to number one on the Gaon Digital Chart. His final album, Poet | Artist, was released posthumously, on January 23, 2018. It became Jonghyun's first album to rank on the Billboard 200, making him the fourth Korean soloist to appear on the chart. In South Korea, it topped the Gaon Album Chart, and was later certified Platinum by the Korea Music Content Association (KMCA) for selling 250,000 copies.

== Albums ==
=== Studio albums ===
List of studio albums, with selected details, chart positions, and sales
Title	Album details	Peak chart positions								Sales	Certifications (Note: In April 2018, Gaon Music Chart introduced music recording certifications for albums, downloads, and streamings that were released and licensed in Korea starting from January 2018 onward.)
Title	Album details	KOR	AUS Dig.	BEL	JPN	NZ Heat	US	US Heat	US World	Sales	Certifications
She Is	Released: May 24, 2016; Label: SM Entertainment; Formats: CD, digital download	1	—	—	21	—	—	20	4	KOR: 90,790; JPN: 7,531	
Poet | Artist	Released: January 23, 2018; Label: SM Entertainment; Formats: CD, digital download	1	20	166	10	5	177	—	1	KOR: 250,000; JPN: 18,204; US: 4,000	KMCA: Platinum
"—" denotes releases that did not chart or were not released in that region.

=== Compilation albums ===
List of compilation albums, with selected details, chart positions, and sales
Title	Album details	Peak chart positions			Sales
Title	Album details	KOR	JPN	US World	Sales
Story Op.1	Released: September 17, 2015; Label: SM Entertainment; Formats: CD, digital download	3	15	7	KOR: 56,329; JPN: 7,527
Story Op.2	Released: April 24, 2017; Label: SM Entertainment; Formats: CD, digital download	2	30	5	KOR: 73,552; JPN: 8,091

== Extended plays ==
List of extended plays, with selected details, chart positions, and sales
Title	Album details	Peak chart positions				Sales
Title	Album details	KOR	JPN	US Heat	US World	Sales
Base	Released: January 12, 2015; Label: SM Entertainment; Formats: CD, digital download	1	14	20	1	KOR: 99,864; JPN: 7,524

== Singles ==
List of singles, with selected chart positions, showing year released, sales and album name
Title	Year	Peak chart positions			Sales	Album
Title	Year	KOR	KOR Hot	US World	Sales	Album
"Deja-Boo" (데자-부) (featuring Zion.T)	2015	1	—	21	KOR: 415,619	Base
"Crazy (Guilty Pleasure)" (featuring Iron)	2015	5	—	12	KOR: 125,629; US: 3,000	Base
"End of a Day" (하루의 끝)	2015	7	18	—	KOR: 271,578	Story Op.1
"Your Voice" (한마디) (with Heritage)	2016	106	—	—	KOR: 29,836	SM Station Season 1
"She Is" (좋아)	2016	14	—	18	KOR: 153,894	She Is
"Inspiration"	2016	—	—	19	—N/a	SM Station Season 1
"Lonely" (featuring Taeyeon)	2017	1	4	6	KOR: 331,742; US: 2,000	Story Op.2
"Shinin'" (빛이 나)	2018	5	4	9	—N/a	Poet | Artist
"Before Our Spring" (우린 봄이 오기 전에)	2018	67	24	—	—N/a	Poet | Artist
"—" denotes releases that did not chart or were not released in that region.

== Collaborations ==
List of collaborations, with selected chart positions, showing year released, sales and album name
Title	Year	Peak chart positions		Sales	Album
Title	Year	KOR	KOR Hot	Sales	Album
"Wrongly Given Love" (交错的爱) (Zhang Liyin featuring Jonghyun)	2008	—	—	—N/a	I Will
"A Gloomy Clock" (우울시계) (IU featuring Jonghyun)	2013	6	11	KOR: 405,520	Modern Times
"Oh Yeah" (Uhm Jung-hwa featuring Jonghyun)	2016	—	—	—N/a	The Cloud Dream of the Nine
"—" denotes releases that did not chart or were not released in that region.

== Soundtrack appearances ==
List of soundtrack appearances, with selected chart positions, showing year released, sales and album name
Title	Year	Peak chart positions	Sales	Album
Title	Year	KOR	Sales	Album
"So Goodbye"	2011	28	KOR: 549,274	City Hunter OST Part 2
"1 Out of 100" (백분의 일)	2013	—	KOR: 30,068	Dream of the Emperor OST Part 3
"She"	2014	67	KOR: 55,727	Birth of a Beauty OST Part 1
"Named" (그 이름) (with Taemin)	2015	36	KOR: 102,429	Who Are You: School 2015 OST Part 6
"Beautiful Lady"	2015	—	—N/a	Oh My Venus OST Part 1
"Only the Words I Love You" (사랑해 이 말 밖엔)	2015	62	KOR: 47,992	Two Yoo Project - Sugar Man OST Part 5
"—" denotes releases that did not chart or were not released in that region.

== Other appearances ==
List of appearances, with selected chart positions, showing year released, sales and album name
Title	Year	Peak chart positions			Sales	Album
Title	Year	KOR	KOR Hot	US World	Sales	Album
"Miss You" (너무 그리워) (as part of SM the Ballad)	2010	16	—	—	—N/a	SM the Ballad Vol. 1 – Miss You
"Hot Times" (시험하지 말기) (as part of SM the Ballad)	2010	93	—	—	US: 4,000	SM the Ballad Vol. 1 – Miss You
"Don't Lie" (with Jino featuring Henry, as part of SM the Ballad)	2010	—	—	—	—N/a	SM the Ballad Vol. 1 – Miss You
"Let's Go" (as part of G-20)	2010	—	—	—	—N/a	Non-album release
"Dear My Family" (as part of SM Town)	2012	—	—	—	—N/a	I Am OST
"You Are A Miracle" (with various artists)	2013	32	—	—	KOR: 63,118	2013 SBS Gayo Daejun Friendship Project
"Breath" (숨소리) (with Taeyeon, as part of SM the Ballad)	2014	3	6	8	KOR: 530,135; US: 3,000	SM the Ballad Vol. 2 – Breath
"A Day Without You" (하루) (with Chen, as part of SM the Ballad)	2014	8	21	—	KOR: 138,388	SM the Ballad Vol. 2 – Breath
"Elevator" (엘리베이터)	2015	—	—	—	—N/a	Monthly Live Connection Track 1
"I Guess Now It's the Fall" (엘가을이긴 한가 봐) (with Go Young-bae)	2015	—	—	—	—N/a	Monthly Live Connection Track 2
"Aewol" (애월 (愛月)) (with Jung Joon-young)	2015	—	—	—	—N/a	Monthly Live Connection Track 3
"Dear My Family" (2017 version) (as part of SM Town)	2017	—	—	—	—N/a	Non-album release
"—" denotes releases that did not chart or were not released in that region.

== Other charted songs ==
List of songs, with selected chart positions, showing year released, sales and album name
Title	Year	Peak chart positions		Sales	Album
Title	Year	KOR	KOR Hot	Sales	Album
"Love Belt" (featuring Younha)	2015	16	—	KOR: 67,205	Base
"Hallelujah" (할렐루야)	2015	27	—	KOR: 33,544	Base
"Mono-Drama" (일인극)	2015	28	—	KOR: 33,867	Base
"Beautiful Tonight" (시간이 늦었어)	2015	29	—	KOR: 34,488	Base
"Neon"	2015	37	—	KOR: 30,370	Base
"U & I"	2015	56	—	KOR: 57,057	Story Op.1
"Diphylleia Grayi" (산하엽)	2015	93	—	KOR: 36,028	Story Op.1
"Like You"	2015	96	—	KOR: 33,924	Story Op.1
"02:34"	2015	101	—	KOR: 35,033	Story Op.1
"Fine" (그래도 되지 않아?)	2015	110	—	KOR: 31,539	Story Op.1
"Maybe Tomorrow" (내일쯤)	2015	114	—	KOR: 30,893	Story Op.1
"I'm Sorry" (미안해)	2015	116	—	KOR: 30,339	Story Op.1
"Happy Birthday"	2015	121	—	KOR: 27,832	Story Op.1
"White T-Shirt"	2016	65	—	KOR: 43,540	She Is
"Orbit" (우주가 있어)	2016	91	—	KOR: 31,822	She Is
"Moon"	2016	109	—	KOR: 27,446	She Is
"Dress Up"	2016	113	—	KOR: 25,389	She Is
"Aurora"	2016	114	—	KOR: 25,264	She Is
"Cocktail"	2016	118	—	KOR: 24,959	She Is
"Suit Up"	2016	119	—	KOR: 24,636	She Is
"Red"	2016	121	—	KOR: 24,313	She Is
"Let Me Out" (놓아줘)	2017	52	71	KOR: 37,178	Story Op.2
"1000"	2017	—	—	KOR: 19,070	Story Op.2
"Our Season" (따뜻한 겨울)	2017	—	—	KOR: 15,095	Story Op.2
"Only One You Need"(환상통)	2018	58	21	—N/a	Poet | Artist
"#Hashtag" (와플)	2018	76	26	—N/a	Poet | Artist
"Grease" (기름때)	2018	94	33	—N/a	Poet | Artist
"Take the Dive"	2018	95	34	—N/a	Poet | Artist
"Sightseeing" (사람 구경 중)	2018	98	37	—N/a	Poet | Artist
"I'm So Curious" (어떤 기분이 들까)	2018	100	38	—N/a	Poet | Artist
"Just For a Day" (하루만이라도)	2018	—	39	—N/a	Poet | Artist
"Sentimental"	2018	—	40	—N/a	Poet | Artist
"Rewind"	2018	—	42	—N/a	Poet | Artist
"—" denotes releases that did not chart or were not released in that region.

== Music videos ==
List of music videos, showing year released and notes
Title	Year	Notes	Ref.
"Crazy (Guilty Pleasure)"	2015	Featuring Iron	
"Deja-Boo"	2015	Featuring Zion. T; showcase stage	
"End of a Day"	2015		
"She Is"	2016		
"Lonely"	2017	Featuring Taeyeon	
"Shinin'"	2018	First posthumous video	
"Before Our Spring"	2018	Second posthumous video	
