= Poet Artist =

Poet | Artist may refer to:

- Poet | Artist (Jonghyun album)
- Poet | Artist (single album)
