= Lonely (Jonghyun song) =

Single by Jonghyun featuring Taeyeon

from the album Story Op.2
- Language: Korean
- Released: April 24, 2017
- Genre: Ballad
- Length: 4:04
- Label: SM; Genie
- Composers: Jonghyun; Wefreaky; Monotree; Imlay
- Lyricist: Jonghyun
- Producers: Jonghyun; Wefreaky; Monotree; Imlay

Jonghyun singles chronology
"Inspiration" (2016)	"Lonely" (2017)	"Shinin'" (2018)

Taeyeon singles chronology
"Make Me Love You" (2017)	"Lonely" (2017)	"This Christmas" (2017)

Music video
- "Lonely" on YouTube

"Lonely" is a song by South Korean singer-songwriter Jonghyun featuring Taeyeon, a member of girl group Girls' Generation. It was released on April 24, 2017 through SM Entertainment, and served as the lead single for his second compilation album, Story Op.2. It was written, composed and arranged by Jonghyun in collaboration with Wefreaky, Monotree and Imlay. "Lonely" was the last single released by Jonghyun during his lifetime and experienced a surge in popularity following his death by suicide on December 18, 2017, reaching number one on Gaon Digital Chart. It has come to be viewed as emblematic of his struggles with mental health.

== Background and release ==
On April 19, 2017, SM Entertainment announced that Jonghyun would be releasing his new song "Lonely" on April 24, and that it was to be a duet with Taeyeon, with whom Jonghyun had previously collaborated for the 2014 SM the Ballad song "Breath". It would serve as the title track to Jonghyun's new compilation album, Story Op.2, a follow-up to 2015's Story Op.1. Unlike his other releases, which present an "idealized" version of himself, the songs on the Story Op albums are intended to showcase a side of Jonghyun that is "more ordinary and human". A teaser was released on April 21 on the SM Town YouTube channel, followed by the subsequent release of the song and its music video three days later. The music video, which was filmed in Los Angeles, depicts Jonghyun alone on the beach and in a large house, conveying feelings of emptiness. "Lonely" was not promoted on music shows; however, Jonghyun and Taeyeon performed the song live on You Hee-yeol's Sketchbook on May 13 in what would be their only joint performance. Jonghyun later performed the song by himself at his solo concert The Agit.

== Composition ==
"Lonely" was written, composed and arranged by Jonghyun. Wefreaky, Monotree and Imlay also made contributions to the composition and arrangement. It has been described as "a heartbreaking, piano-guided midtempo ballad that reflects on the feelings of things never getting better amid a sense of immense loneliness." Jonghyun wrote "Lonely" expressly because he wanted to sing with Taeyeon, and tailored the song's composition to her. He said, "I wanted to take the aura that she has, where she’s a bright and happy person with a sensitive and lonely side as well, and put that in the lyrics. I thought of her while I was writing the lyrics and melody." It is structured as though Jonghyun and Taeyeon are in conversation with each other. Despite the simple instrumentation and relative lack of high notes, the song expresses desperate emotion. The lyrical content drew increased attention following Jonghyun's suicide, and was re-examined by fans and journalists for signs of loneliness and depression.

== Commercial performance ==
Upon its release, "Lonely" was a moderate success, debuting at number 18 on Gaon Digital Chart. However, it quickly rose to the top of multiple domestic and international charts following Jonghyun's death on December 18, 2017. "Lonely" re-entered Gaon that week at number one, becoming Jonghyun's second song to top the chart after 2015's "Deja-Boo". It also reached new peaks on the Billboard K-pop Hot 100 and World Digital Song Sales, charting at number four and number six, respectively, and sold 1,000 downloads in the US in the week ending December 21. As of December 2017, "Lonely" has sold 331,742 downloads in South Korea.

== Credits and personnel ==
Credits adapted from Melon.

- Jonghyun – vocals, lyrics, composition, arrangement
- Taeyeon – vocals
- Wefreaky – composition, arrangement
- Monotree – composition, arrangement
- Imlay – composition, arrangement

== Charts ==
=== Weekly charts ===
Weekly chart performance for "Lonely"
Chart (2017)	Peak position
South Korea (Gaon)	1
South Korea (Hot 100)	4
US World Digital Songs (Billboard)	6

=== Monthly charts ===
Monthly chart performance for "Lonely"
Chart (2017)	Peak position
South Korea (Gaon)	13

== Release history ==
Release dates and formats for "Lonely"
Region	Date	Format	Label	Ref.
Various	April 24, 2017	Digital download; streaming	SM Entertainment; Genie Music	
