= The Agit =

Concert series in Seoul, South Korea

- Concert series tour by Jonghyun, Taeyeon, Kyuhyun, Yesung, Tiffany, Kangta, Seohyun, and Key
- Location: South Korea
- Start date: October 2, 2015
- End date: February 17, 2019
- No. of shows: 97

The Agit (stylized as THE AGIT) is a concert series brand by SM Entertainment. It is held in SMTOWN Theatre located in Samseong-dong, Coex Artium in Seoul, South Korea.

== The Story by Jonghyun ==
The Story by Jonghyun
- Tour by Jonghyun
- Location: South Korea
- Associated album: The Collection: Story Op.1
- Start date: October 2, 2015
- End date: December 13, 2015
- No. of shows: 17

The Story by Jonghyun is the first concert series by Jonghyun, which was held from October 2 to October 4, 2015, and later from October 8 to October 11, 2015. The encore was held on December 12 and December 13, 2015.

=== Set list ===
1. "Déjà-Boo"
2. "Hallelujah"
3. "Juliette" (Shinee cover) (Acoustic version)
4. "Playboy" (Exo cover)
5. "No More" (Lim Kim cover)
6. "Red Candle" (Son Dam-bi cover)
7. "U & I"
8. "Happy Birthday" / "Maybe Tomorrow" / "02:34" / "A Gloomy Clock" (IU cover) / "Love Belt"
9. "Elevator"
10. "I'm Sorry"
11. "End of a Day"
12. "Diphylleia Grayi"
13. "Fine"
14. "Like You"
15. "Crazy (Guilty Pleasure)"

Encore

16. "Fortune Cookie"
17. "Beautiful Tonight"
Set list for The Story by Jonghyun [Epilogue]
1. "Déjà-Boo"
2. "Hallelujah"
3. "Mono-Drama"
4. "Neon"
5. "Playboy" (Exo cover)
6. "No More" (Lim Kim cover)
7. "Red Candle" (Son Dam-bi cover)
8. "U & I"
9. "Maybe Tomorrow" / "A Gloomy Clock" (IU cover) / "02:34" / "Happy Birthday" / "Love Belt"
10. "Elevator"
11. "I'm Sorry"
12. "End of a Day"
13. "DiphylleiaGrayi"
14. "Fine"
15. "Like You"
16. "Crazy (Guilty Pleasure)"

Encore

17. "Fortune Cookie"
18. "Beautiful Tonight"
19. "Our Season"
Special guests
- October 2, 2015 – Taemin of Shinee
- October 3, 2015 – Jungin
- October 3, 2015 – Nine9 of Dear Cloud
- October 8, 2015 – Coffee Boy
- October 9, 2015 – Rooftop Moonlight
- October 10, 2015 – Zion.T
- October 11, 2015 – E Z Hyung
- October 16, 2015 – Soran
- October 17, 2015 – Onew of Shinee
- October 17, 2015 – Lim Kim
- October 18, 2015 – IU

=== Shows ===
Date	City	Country	Venue	Attendance
October 2, 2015	Seoul	South Korea	SMTOWN Theatre	16,000
October 3, 2015 (Daytime performance)	Seoul	South Korea	SMTOWN Theatre	16,000
October 3, 2015 (Nighttime performance)	Seoul	South Korea	SMTOWN Theatre	16,000
October 4, 2015	Seoul	South Korea	SMTOWN Theatre	16,000
October 8, 2015	Seoul	South Korea	SMTOWN Theatre	16,000
October 9, 2015	Seoul	South Korea	SMTOWN Theatre	16,000
October 10, 2015	Seoul	South Korea	SMTOWN Theatre	16,000
October 11, 2015	Seoul	South Korea	SMTOWN Theatre	16,000
October 16, 2015	Seoul	South Korea	SMTOWN Theatre	16,000
October 17, 2015 (Daytime performance)	Seoul	South Korea	SMTOWN Theatre	16,000
October 17, 2015 (Nighttime performance)	Seoul	South Korea	SMTOWN Theatre	16,000
October 18, 2015	Seoul	South Korea	SMTOWN Theatre	16,000
December 11, 2015	Seoul	South Korea	SMTOWN Theatre	16,000
December 12, 2015 (Daytime performance)	Seoul	South Korea	SMTOWN Theatre	16,000
December 12, 2015 (Nighttime performance)	Seoul	South Korea	SMTOWN Theatre	16,000
December 13, 2015 (Daytime performance)	Seoul	South Korea	SMTOWN Theatre	16,000
December 13, 2015 (Nighttime performance)	Seoul	South Korea	SMTOWN Theatre	16,000

== Taeyeon's Very Special Day ==
Taeyeon's Very Special Day
- Tour by Taeyeon
- Location: South Korea
- Associated album: I
- Start date: October 23, 2015
- End date: November 1, 2015
- No. of shows: 7

Taeyeon's Very Special Day (Korean: 태연의 아주 특별한 하루; RR: Taeyeonui aju teukbyeolhan haru) is the first concert series by Taeyeon, which was held from October 23 to October 25, 2015, and later from October 30 to November 1, 2015.

=== Set list ===
1. "I"
2. "Farewell"
3. "Set Me Free"
4. "Only One"
5. "Missing You Like Crazy"
6. "Can You Hear Me"
7. "Holler" (Girls' Generation-TTS cover)
8. "Eyes" (Girls' Generation-TTS cover)
9. "Twinkle" (Girls' Generation-TTS cover)
10. "Stress"
11. "End of a Day"
12. "Love Me like You Do" (Ellie Goulding cover)
13. "Merry-Go-Round" / "Lion Heart" (Girls' Generation cover)
14. "Lion Heart" / "Top Secret (Shake the Tree)" (Girls' Generation cover)
15. "Dancing Queen" / "Goodbye" (Girls' Generation cover)

Encore

16. "U R"
17. "Gemini"

=== Shows ===
Date	City	Country	Venue	Attendance
October 23, 2015	Seoul	South Korea	SMTOWN Theatre	5,600
October 24, 2015	Seoul	South Korea	SMTOWN Theatre	5,600
October 25, 2015	Seoul	South Korea	SMTOWN Theatre	5,600
October 29, 2015	Seoul	South Korea	SMTOWN Theatre	5,600
October 30, 2015	Seoul	South Korea	SMTOWN Theatre	5,600
October 31, 2015	Seoul	South Korea	SMTOWN Theatre	5,600
November 1, 2015	Seoul	South Korea	SMTOWN Theatre	5,600

== And It's Fall Again ==
And It's Fall Again
- Tour by Kyuhyun
- Location: South Korea
- Associated album: Fall, Once Again
- Start date: November 5, 2015
- End date: November 15, 2015
- No. of shows: 7

And It's Fall Again (Korean: 그리고 또 가을; RR: Geurigo tto gaeul) is the first concert series by Kyuhyun, which was held from November 5 to November 8, 2015, and later from November 13 to November 15, 2015.

=== Set list ===
1. "Hope is a Dream That Doesn't Sleep"
2. "Eternal Sunshine"
3. "One Confession"
4. "Remember Me"
5. "Because I Miss You"
6. "Late Autumn"
7. "The Etude of Memory" (Kim Dong-ryul cover)
8. "Too Much" (Kim Soohee cover)
9. "Stranger"
10. "The Day We Felt the Distance"
11. "New Endless Love"
12. "Kanade"
13. "Fear" (Mino cover)
14. "At Gwanghwamun"

Encore

15. "A Million Pieces"
16. "Piano Forest"
17. "Till I Reach Your Star"
Special guests
- November 15, 2015 – Ryeowook of Super Junior and Minho of Shinee

=== Shows ===
Date	City	Country	Venue	Attendance
November 5, 2015	Seoul	South Korea	SMTOWN Theatre	5,600
November 6, 2015	Seoul	South Korea	SMTOWN Theatre	5,600
November 7, 2015	Seoul	South Korea	SMTOWN Theatre	5,600
November 8, 2015	Seoul	South Korea	SMTOWN Theatre	5,600
November 13, 2015	Seoul	South Korea	SMTOWN Theatre	5,600
November 14, 2015	Seoul	South Korea	SMTOWN Theatre	5,600
November 15, 2015	Seoul	South Korea	SMTOWN Theatre	5,600

== Ever Lasting Star ==
Ever Lasting Star
- Tour by Ryeowook
- Location: South Korea
- Associated album: The Little Prince
- Start date: February 19, 2016
- End date: March 13, 2016
- No. of shows: 6

Ever Lasting Star is the first concert series by Ryeowook, which was held from February 19 to February 21, 2016.

=== Set list ===
1. "Problem" (Ariana Grande cover)
2. "Foxy Girl"
3. "Coagulation" (Super Junior cover)
4. "Dorothy" (Super Junior cover)
5. "Love U More" (Super Junior cover)
6. "This Is Love" / "Sorry, Sorry" / "It's You" / "Bonamana" / "Devil" (Super Junior medley)
7. "Mikazuki" (Ayaka cover) / Common Jasmine Orange (Jay Chou cover) / It Could Be Love (Stamp cover) / "Die Hard" (Justin Lo cover) / "Bunga Terakhir" (Bebi Romeo cover) / "Baby" (Justin Bieber cover) (International medley)
8. "Poom"
9. "Like a Star"
10. "People You May Know"
11. "The Little Prince"

Encore

12. "Hello"
13. "One Fine Spring Day"
Special guests
- February 19, 2016 – N of VIXX
- February 19, 2016 – Seo Tae-hoon, Kim Young-hee, Heo Anna, and Hong Hyun-hee
- February 19, 2016 – Kim Tae-hyun of DickPunks
- March 11, 2016 – N of VIXX
- March 12, 2016 – Kyuhyun of Super Junior and DK and Seungkwan of Seventeen
- March 13, 2016 – Yesung of Super Junior

=== Shows ===
Date	City	Country	Venue	Attendance
February 19, 2016	Seoul	South Korea	SMTOWN Theatre	4,800
February 20, 2016	Seoul	South Korea	SMTOWN Theatre	4,800
February 21, 2016	Seoul	South Korea	SMTOWN Theatre	4,800
March 11, 2016	Seoul	South Korea	SMTOWN Theatre	4,800
March 12, 2016	Seoul	South Korea	SMTOWN Theatre	4,800
March 13, 2016	Seoul	South Korea	SMTOWN Theatre	4,800

== Sweet Coffee ==
Sweet Coffee
- Tour by Yesung
- Location: South Korea
- Associated album: Here I Am
- Start date: June 3, 2016
- End date: August 7, 2016
- No. of shows: 6

Sweet Coffee (Korean: 커피 한 잔 시럽은 많이; RR: Keopi han jan sireobeun mani; lit. 'A Cup of Coffee and a Lot of Syrup') is the first concert series by Yesung, which was held from June 3 to June 19, 2016. The encore of the concert, titled Sweet Coffee -Refill-, was held from August 5 to August 7, 2016.

=== Set list ===
1. "My Dear"
2. "We"
3. "Promise You"
4. "Storm" (Super Junior cover)
5. "Gray Paper" / "It Has To Be You"
6. "Loving You" / "Waiting for You" / "Blind for Love" (OST medley)
7. "Your Eyes"
8. "It's You" + "Haru" (Super Junior cover)
9. "Between"
10. "Spring in Me"
11. "Happy Together" (Super Junior cover)
12. "U" / "Simply Beautiful" (Super Junior medley 1)
13. "This Is Love" / "No Other" (Super Junior medley 2)
14. "Way for Love" / "Show Me Your Love" / "Pajama Party" (Super Junior medley 3)
15. "Your Echo"
16. "Here I Am"

Encore

17. "So Close Yet So Far"
18. "Confession"
Special guests
- June 3, 2016 – Dalchong and Park Si-hwan
- June 4, 2016 – Dalchong, Na Yoon-kwon, Ryeowook of Super Junior, and Zhou Mi of Super Junior-M
- June 5, 2016 – U Sung-eun and Alex Chu
- June 17, 2016 – Lee Se-jun of Yurisangja, Wendy of Red Velvet, and Chanyeol of Exo
- June 18, 2016 – Dalchong, Team One Sound, and NCT U
- June 19, 2016 – Brothers, Dalchong, and Leeteuk and Kyuhyun of Super Junior
- August 5, 2016 – Taemin of Shinee, Wendy of Red Velvet, NCT 127, and MQ
- August 6, 2016 – Ali

=== Shows ===
Date	City	Country	Venue	Attendance
June 3, 2016	Seoul	South Korea	SMTOWN Theatre	7,200
June 4, 2016	Seoul	South Korea	SMTOWN Theatre	7,200
June 5, 2016	Seoul	South Korea	SMTOWN Theatre	7,200
June 17, 2016	Seoul	South Korea	SMTOWN Theatre	7,200
June 18, 2016	Seoul	South Korea	SMTOWN Theatre	7,200
June 19, 2016	Seoul	South Korea	SMTOWN Theatre	7,200

== Weekend ==
Weekend
- Tour by Tiffany
- Location: South Korea
- Associated album: I Just Wanna Dance
- Start date: June 10, 2016
- End date: June 26, 2016
- No. of shows: 6

Weekend is the first concert series by Tiffany, which was held from June 10 to June 12, 2016, and later from June 24 to June 26, 2016.

=== Set list ===
1. "I Just Wanna Dance"
2. "Talk"
3. "Fool"
4. "What Do I Do"
5. "Weekend"
6. "Bittersweet & Crazy"
7. "Once in a Lifetime"
8. "A Dream is a Wish Your Heart Makes" / "Part of Your World" (Disney medley)
9. "Ring" / "Only One" / "I'm Alone" (OST medley)
10. "Yellow Light"
11. "Baby Steps" / "Talk Talk" / "Indestructible" (English version) (Girls' Generation cover)
12. "Moon & Sunrise" (BoA cover) / "Same Old Love" (Selena Gomez cover) / "Red" (Taylor Swift cover) / "Dangerous Woman" (Ariana Grande cover) / "This Kiss" (Carly Rae Jepsen cover) / "Cake by the Ocean" (DNCE cover)
13. "Heartbreak Hotel"

Encore

14. "Party" (Girls' Generation cover)
Notes

The following songs were performed by Tiffany in place of "T-Time with Tiffany":

- During the first show, "Moon & Sunrise".
- During the second show, "Same Old Love".
- During the third show, "Red".
- During the fourth show, "Dangerous Woman".
- During the fifth show, "This Kiss".
- During the sixth show, "Cake by the Ocean".

=== Shows ===
Date	City	Country	Venue	Attendance
June 10, 2016	Seoul	South Korea	SMTOWN Theatre	4,800
June 11, 2016	Seoul	South Korea	SMTOWN Theatre	4,800
June 12, 2016	Seoul	South Korea	SMTOWN Theatre	4,800
June 24, 2016	Seoul	South Korea	SMTOWN Theatre	4,800
June 25, 2016	Seoul	South Korea	SMTOWN Theatre	4,800
June 26, 2016	Seoul	South Korea	SMTOWN Theatre	4,800

== Coming Home ==
Coming Home
- Tour by Kangta
- Location: South Korea
- Associated album: 'Home' Chapter 1
- Start date: November 4, 2016
- End date: December 11, 2016
- No. of shows: 7

Coming Home (Korean: 보통의 날; RR: Botongui nal; lit. 'Ordinary Day') is the first concert series by Kangta, which was held from November 4 to November 6, 2016. Originally scheduled for a three-day show, two performances in Seoul and two in Busan were added.

=== Set list ===
1. "Love is Coming"
2. "Memories"
3. "Late Summer Night"
4. "Sorry, Sorry" (Super Junior cover)
5. "Looking Back and Loving Again"
6. "Waiting..." (BoA cover)
7. "Russian Roulette (Red Velvet cover)
8. "Candy" / "Full of Happiness" / "Hope" (H.O.T. medley)
9. "Falling in Love"
10. "My Life"
11. "Say Something" (A Great Big World cover)
12. "Still With You"
13. "Pine Tree" + "Polaris"
14. "Diner"

Encore

15. "Propose"
16. Together, Forever
Set list for the additional shows
1. "Love is Coming"
2. "Late Summer Night"
3. "Sorry, Sorry" (Super Junior cover)
4. "Still With You"
5. "Looking Back and Loving Again"
6. "Waiting..." (BoA cover)
7. "Russian Roulette (Red Velvet cover)
8. "Candy" / "Full of Happiness" / "Hope" (H.O.T. medley)
9. "Falling in Love"
10. "My Life"
11. "Say Something" (A Great Big World cover)
12. "Pine Tree" + "Polaris"
13. "Diner"

Encore

14. "Propose"
15. Together, Forever
Notes

The following song was performed by Kangta

- Only during the first show, "Memories" was sung.

=== Shows ===
Date	City	Country	Venue	Attendance
November 4, 2016	Seoul	South Korea	SMTOWN Theatre	4,000
November 5, 2016	Seoul	South Korea	SMTOWN Theatre	4,000
November 6, 2016	Seoul	South Korea	SMTOWN Theatre	4,000
November 19, 2016	Seoul	South Korea	SMTOWN Theatre	4,000
November 20, 2016	Seoul	South Korea	SMTOWN Theatre	4,000
December 10, 2016	Busan	South Korea	Sohyang Theatre Shinhan Card Hall	2,000
December 11, 2016	Busan	South Korea	Sohyang Theatre Shinhan Card Hall	2,000

== Love, Still ==
Love, Still
- Tour by Seohyun
- Location: South Korea
- Associated album: Don't Say No
- Start date: February 24, 2017
- End date: April 9, 2017
- No. of shows: 5

Love, Still was the first concert series by Seohyun. It was held from February 24 to February 26, 2017, with encore shows added in April.

=== Set list ===
1. "Magic"
2. "Bad Love"
3. "Moonlight"
4. "Baby Baby" (Girls' Generation cover)
5. "Day By Day" / "Kissing You" (Girls' Generation cover)
6. "Hello"
7. "All That Jazz" (Musical Chicago cover)
8. "My Strongest Suit" (Musical Aida cover)
9. "I'll Wait for You"
10. "It's OK to Be Hurt"
11. "Love Sick" (Girls' Generation-TTS cover)
12. "Lonely Love"
13. "Beautiful" (Carly Rae Jepsen cover)
14. "Kiss Me" (Sixpence None the Richer cover)
15. "Speak Now" (Taylor Swift cover)
16. "What the Spring?" (10cm cover)
17. "Goodbye" (Girls' Generation cover)
18. "Hoot" (Girls' Generation cover)
19. "Party" (Girls' Generation cover)
20. "Don't Say No"
21. "Love & Affection"

Encore

22. "Into the New World" (Girls' Generation cover)
23. "Twinkle" (Girls' Generation-TTS cover)
24. "Problem" (Ariana Grande cover) / "Shake It" (Sistar cover)
25. "Bang Bang" (Jessie J cover)
26. "I Like the Way" (Girls' Generation-TTS cover)

=== Shows ===
Date	City	Country	Venue
February 24, 2017	Seoul	South Korea	SM Town Theatre
February 25, 2017	Seoul	South Korea	SM Town Theatre
February 26, 2017	Seoul	South Korea	SM Town Theatre
April 8, 2017	Seoul	South Korea	SM Town Theatre
April 9, 2017	Seoul	South Korea	SM Town Theatre

== The Letter ==
The Letter
- Tour by Jonghyun
- Location: South Korea
- Associated album: Story Op.2
- Start date: May 26, 2017
- End date: July 2, 2017
- No. of shows: 20

The Letter (Korean: 유리병편지; RR: Yuribyeongpyeonji) was the second concert series by Jonghyun under The Agit branding. It was held from May 26 to July 2, 2017. 12 concerts were initially planned, but Jonghyun decided to hold eight more after they sold out at fans' request.

=== Shows ===
Date	City	Country	Venue	Attendance
May 26, 2017	Seoul	South Korea	SM Town Theatre	14,000
May 27, 2017	Seoul	South Korea	SM Town Theatre	14,000
May 28, 2017 (1)	Seoul	South Korea	SM Town Theatre	14,000
May 28, 2017 (2)	Seoul	South Korea	SM Town Theatre	14,000
June 1, 2017	Seoul	South Korea	SM Town Theatre	14,000
June 2, 2017	Seoul	South Korea	SM Town Theatre	14,000
June 3, 2017	Seoul	South Korea	SM Town Theatre	14,000
June 4, 2017	Seoul	South Korea	SM Town Theatre	14,000
June 6, 2017	Seoul	South Korea	SM Town Theatre	14,000
June 8, 2017	Seoul	South Korea	SM Town Theatre	14,000
June 9, 2017	Seoul	South Korea	SM Town Theatre	14,000
June 10, 2017	Seoul	South Korea	SM Town Theatre	14,000
June 14, 2017	Seoul	South Korea	SM Town Theatre	14,000
June 15, 2017	Seoul	South Korea	SM Town Theatre	14,000
June 16, 2017	Seoul	South Korea	SM Town Theatre	14,000
June 17, 2017 (1)	Seoul	South Korea	SM Town Theatre	14,000
June 17, 2017 (2)	Seoul	South Korea	SM Town Theatre	14,000
June 18, 2017	Seoul	South Korea	SM Town Theatre	14,000
July 2, 2017 (1)	Seoul	South Korea	SM Town Theatre	14,000
July 2, 2017 (2)	Seoul	South Korea	SM Town Theatre	14,000

== Key Land ==
Key Land
- Tour by Key
- Location: South Korea
- Associated album: Face
- Start date: February 2, 2019
- End date: February 17, 2019
- No. of shows: 11

Key Land was the first concert series by Key. It was held from February 2 to February 17, 2019. Six concerts were originally scheduled, with five additional performances added later to accommodate demand. All 11 shows sold out.

=== Shows ===
Date	City	Country	Venue
February 2, 2019	Seoul	South Korea	SM Town Theatre
February 3, 2019 (1)	Seoul	South Korea	SM Town Theatre
February 3, 2019 (2)	Seoul	South Korea	SM Town Theatre
February 7, 2019	Seoul	South Korea	SM Town Theatre
February 8, 2019	Seoul	South Korea	SM Town Theatre
February 9, 2019 (1)	Seoul	South Korea	SM Town Theatre
February 9, 2019 (2)	Seoul	South Korea	SM Town Theatre
February 10, 2019	Seoul	South Korea	SM Town Theatre
February 16, 2019	Seoul	South Korea	SM Town Theatre
February 17, 2019 (1)	Seoul	South Korea	SM Town Theatre
February 17, 2019 (2)	Seoul	South Korea	SM Town Theatre
