= Poet Artist (single album) =

Poet | Artist
- Digital cover

Single album by Shinee
- Released: May 25, 2025
- Studio: SM Starlight (Seoul)
- Genres: Electropop; dance-pop
- Length: 6:24
- Languages: Korean; English
- Label: SM
- Producers: Deez; Yunsu; Grant Boutin

Shinee chronology
Hard (2023)	Poet | Artist (2025)	Atmos (2026)

Singles from Poet | Artist
- 1. "Poet | Artist" Released: May 25, 2025

Poet | Artist is the first single album by South Korean boy band Shinee. It was released on May 25, 2025, through SM Entertainment, to mark the group's 17th anniversary. The album was interpreted by music critics as a tribute to their late bandmate Jonghyun, who died in 2017. It consists of two tracks, including the lead single, "Poet | Artist", which was written by Jonghyun prior to his death.

== Background ==
Shinee released their eighth studio album, Hard, in 2023. Members Onew and Taemin departed longtime label SM Entertainment in March 2024, joining Griffin Entertainment and BPM Entertainment, respectively, while Key and Minho remained signed with the agency. Following this, the members focused on their solo careers. In February 2025, Taemin revealed in an interview with Billboard that Shinee were planning to release a new album that year, after the conclusion of his solo tour. On May 12, SM confirmed that Shinee would release a new single album on May 25, the 17th anniversary of their debut. The album's title was later announced to be Poet | Artist. The title references the final studio album released by the late Shinee member Jonghyun, who died in 2017.

== Composition ==
The album contains two songs. Lead single "Poet | Artist" was written and composed by Jonghyun for Shinee. The song also features his vocals, taken from the guide version he left behind. Shinee said that they made the decision to include Jonghyun's voice after much discussion as they felt it would be meaningful with all five members. They used a similar singing style to Jonghyun, emulating his intonation and rhythm. It is an electropop song that blends an "aggressive" snare and reggae rhythm with vocal riffs. The lyrics contain sentiments about creating something new by applying poetic license to everyday life. "Starlight" is a midtempo dance-pop song with electric guitar, synth pads and energetic vocals. It describes meeting someone new who shines like starlight in the darkness.

== Artwork and packaging ==
The packaging for the CD version adheres to the design of Jonghyun's past albums, as well as the other Shinee members' debut solo albums. The album artwork depicts the four members holding hands. There is an empty space in the centre, which South Korean journalist Han Su-jin felt symbolised Jonghyun. Han noted that Shinee have continually affirmed that they are a five-member group, and felt that this was embodied in the imagery for the album. The SMC version includes dolls representing each of the five Shinee members. The packaging for this version displays each member holding their doll with their hands, while the Jonghyun doll is held by all four members. The doll representing Jonghyun is named "secondborn", indicating his status as the second-oldest member, and labelled with his signature "ㅎㅅㅎ" emoticon. Ilgan Sports reporter Kim Ji-hye observed that SM was careful not to mention Jonghyun's name directly, speculating that they did not want their intentions to be misread as a promotional tactic. The dolls have magnets inserted in their hands so they can hold hands with each other. SM released a video of them holding hands on Shinee's official YouTube channel, which received positive responses from fans.

== Release and promotion ==
Pre-orders for Poet | Artist began on May 19. Shinee released concept images the following day; the images portrayed Shinee hidden in shadow, then brightly illuminated. In the week leading up to Shinee's 17th anniversary, they held a celebratory event titled "Shinee Week", in which they livestreamed recordings of past concerts via their official YouTube channel. Shinee held concerts in Seoul, titled Shinee World VII: E.S.S.A.Y, from May 23 to 25, with the final concert falling on Shinee's debut date. They premiered both new songs at the concerts, backed by a live band. The album was released digitally at midnight on May 25, followed by a physical release the next day.

== Track listing ==
Poet | Artist track listing
No.	Title	Lyrics	Music	Arrangement	Length
1.	"Poet | Artist"	Jonghyun	Deez; Jonghyun; Yunsu	Deez; Yunsu	3:24
2.	"Starlight"	Kang Eun-jeong	Anthony Watts; Grant Boutin; Peter Fenn; Marty Rod	Boutin	3:00
Total length:					6:24

== Credits and personnel ==
Credits adapted from the single album's liner notes.

Studio

- SM Starlight Studio – recording, digital editing, engineered for mix (all), mixing (2)
- Soultrii Studio – digital editing (1)
- SM Blue Cup Studio – mixing (1)
- 821 Sound – mastering (all)

Personnel

- SM Entertainment – executive producer
- Shinee – vocals (all), background vocals (all)
- Deez – producer (1), background vocals (1), instrumentation (1), digital editing (1)
- Yunsu – producer (1), instrumentation (1)
- Anthony Watts – background vocals (2)
- Grant Boutin – producer (2), background vocals (2)
- Peter Fenn – background vocals (2)
- Marty Rod – background vocals (2)
- Jsong – vocal directing (1)
- 1Take (NewType) – vocal directing (2)
- Jeong Yoo-ra – recording (all), digital editing (all), engineered for mix (all), mixing (2)
- Jung Eui-seok – mixing (1)
- Kwon Nam-woo – mastering (all)

== Charts ==
=== Weekly charts ===
Weekly chart performance for Poet | Artist
Chart (2025)	Peak position
South Korean Albums (Circle)	2

=== Monthly charts ===
Monthly chart performance for Poet | Artist
Chart (2025)	Position
South Korean Albums (Circle)	20

=== Year-end charts ===
Year-end chart performance for Poet | Artist
Chart (2025)	Position
South Korean Albums (Circle)	85
