= Jonghyun =

South Korean singer-songwriter (1990–2017)

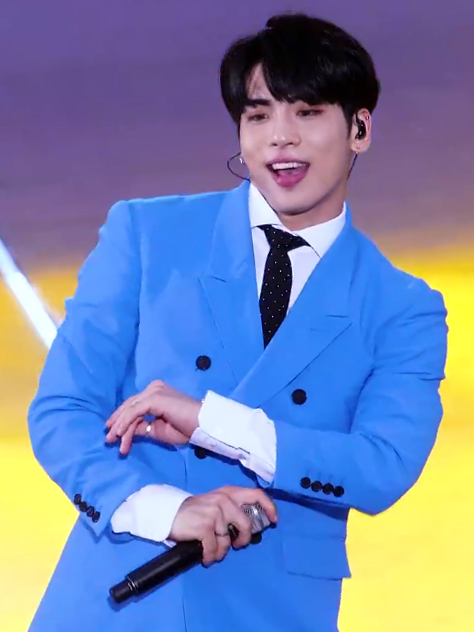
- Jonghyun at SM Town Live in July 2017
- Born: Kim Jong-hyun; April 8, 1990; Seoul, South Korea
- Died: December 18, 2017 (aged 27); Seoul, South Korea
- Cause of death: Suicide by carbon monoxide poisoning
- Occupations: Singer-songwriter; record producer; radio host; author
- Musical career
- Genres: K-pop; R&B
- Instrument: Vocals
- Years active: 2008–2017
- Label: SM
- Formerly of: Shinee; SM Town; SM the Ballad

Korean name
- Hangul: 김종현
- RR: Gim Jonghyeon
- MR: Kim Chonghyŏn

Kim Jong-hyun (Korean: 김종현; April 8, 1990 – December 18, 2017), known mononymously as Jonghyun, was a South Korean singer-songwriter, record producer, radio host, and author under the SM Entertainment label. He was the vocalist of the South Korean boy band Shinee for nine years, releasing twelve albums with the group in both Korean and Japanese. He also participated in SM Entertainment's project group, SM the Ballad, for the release of two EP albums.

Jonghyun was also a solo artist, beginning in January 2015 with the release of his first EP album, Base. It peaked at number one on both the Billboard World Albums Chart and the Gaon Album Chart. On September 17 the same year, Jonghyun released a compilation album, Story Op.1. His debut studio album, She Is, was released on May 24, 2016, followed by his second compilation album, Story Op.2, on April 24, 2017. Jonghyun began his first solo concert tour, The Story by Jonghyun, on October 2, 2015. This was followed by three further concert tours in later years. He was regarded as one of the best vocalists in South Korea. He also received praise for his artistic control and involvement in the creation of his music.

Jonghyun remained musically active as the vocalist of Shinee and as a solo artist until his death on December 18, 2017, when he died by suicide. His final album, Poet | Artist, was released posthumously on January 23, 2018. It was announced, prior to the release, that all profits from the album would be given to Jonghyun's mother and be used to start a charity foundation. In September 2018, the Shiny Foundation was established by Jonghyun's family to help struggling young artists.

== Early life and education ==
Jonghyun was born in Seoul. He has an older sister. His family received welfare support during his school years. During middle school he became involved in a school band, and credits Japanese rock star Yoshiki and his band X Japan for influencing his early interest in composing music. He studied at Seoul Music High School, but dropped out in 10th grade to pursue a music career. He graduated from Chungwoon University's Department of Applied Music, and later received a master's degree in film and musical studies from Myongji University.

== Career ==
=== 2005–2014: Career beginnings ===
Jonghyun was scouted by SM Entertainment when he was 15 years old, after playing in a song festival with his band at school. As a trainee, he featured on the Zhang Liyin song "Wrongly Given Love". Jonghyun debuted as part of the five-member boy group Shinee on May 25, 2008, on SBS' Inkigayo. He started contributing to the group as a songwriter the following year, writing the lyrics to their fourth Korean single, "Juliette", which was included on the group's second EP, Romeo. Jonghyun said he was inspired by the 1968 film Romeo and Juliet, and he wanted to write a romance story that "will make everyone interested but also a story which everyone can identify with".

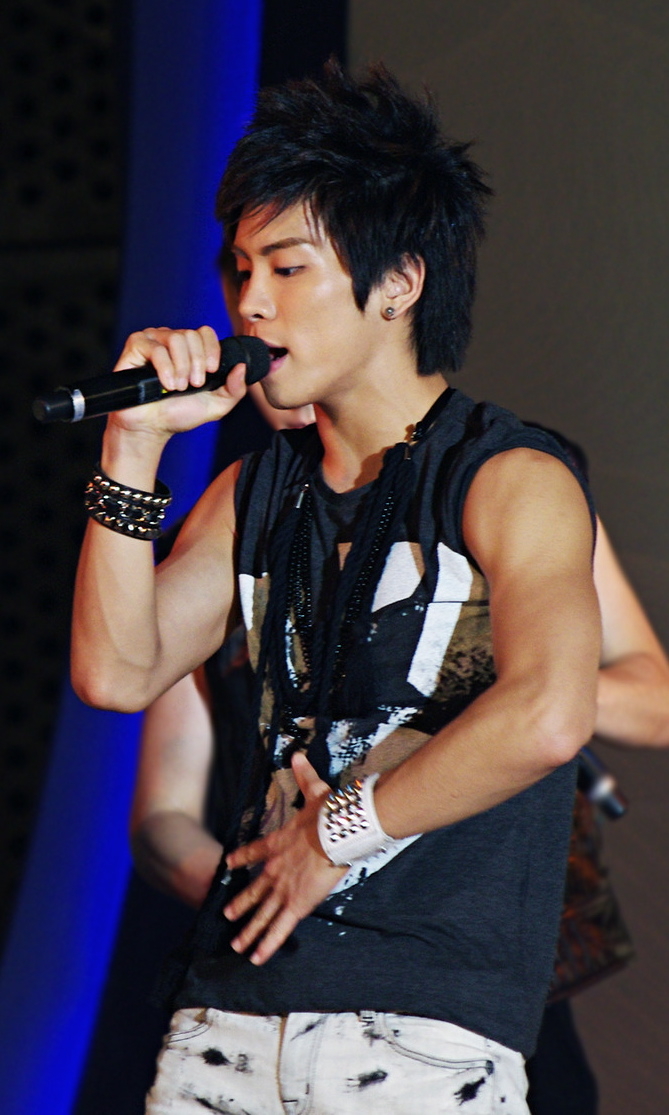
Jonghyun in 2010

Jonghyun was one of twenty idols from various South Korean groups that recorded the song "Let's Go", which promoted the 2010 G20 Seoul summit. He provided vocals along with labelmates Sungmin of Super Junior, Seohyun of Girls' Generation and Luna of f(x). Jonghyun, along with TRAX's Jay, Super Junior's Kyuhyun, and Jino, participated in SM the Ballad, a project group formed by SM Entertainment with a focus on ballads. The group released their debut EP, Miss You, on November 29, 2010.

Jonghyun appeared on KBS' Immortal Songs: Singing the Legend, a 2011 television competition program where singers perform new versions of old songs by "legendary singers". Jonghyun won the first round and defeated his labelmate, Yesung of Super Junior, but left the show after the first episode due to his busy schedule. The show subsequently came under fire from viewers, who claimed the program's harsh elimination method and structure left Jonghyun in tears on stage.

Jonghyun received composition credits for the track "A Gloomy Clock", which was included on IU's third studio album, Modern Times, in October 2013. The song, which Jonghyun gave to IU as a friend, also features his vocals. Two months later, Son Dam-bi released the song "Red Candle", which was also written by Jonghyun. He provided vocal direction for the track, in addition to lyric writing and composition.

Jonghyun began hosting the MBC radio program Blue Night in February 2014. MBC said they chose Jonghyun to host because of his dedication to music-related activities and passion for music. He later began a segment on the show where he wrote songs based on stories submitted by listeners. After a four-year hiatus, SM the Ballad returned on February 13, with a new line-up and their second EP, Breath. Jonghyun performed the title track "Breath" as a collaboration with Girls' Generation's Taeyeon. In August, fellow Shinee member Taemin released his first EP, Ace, for which Jonghyun wrote the track "Pretty Boy".

=== 2015–2016: Base, Story Op.1 and She Is ===
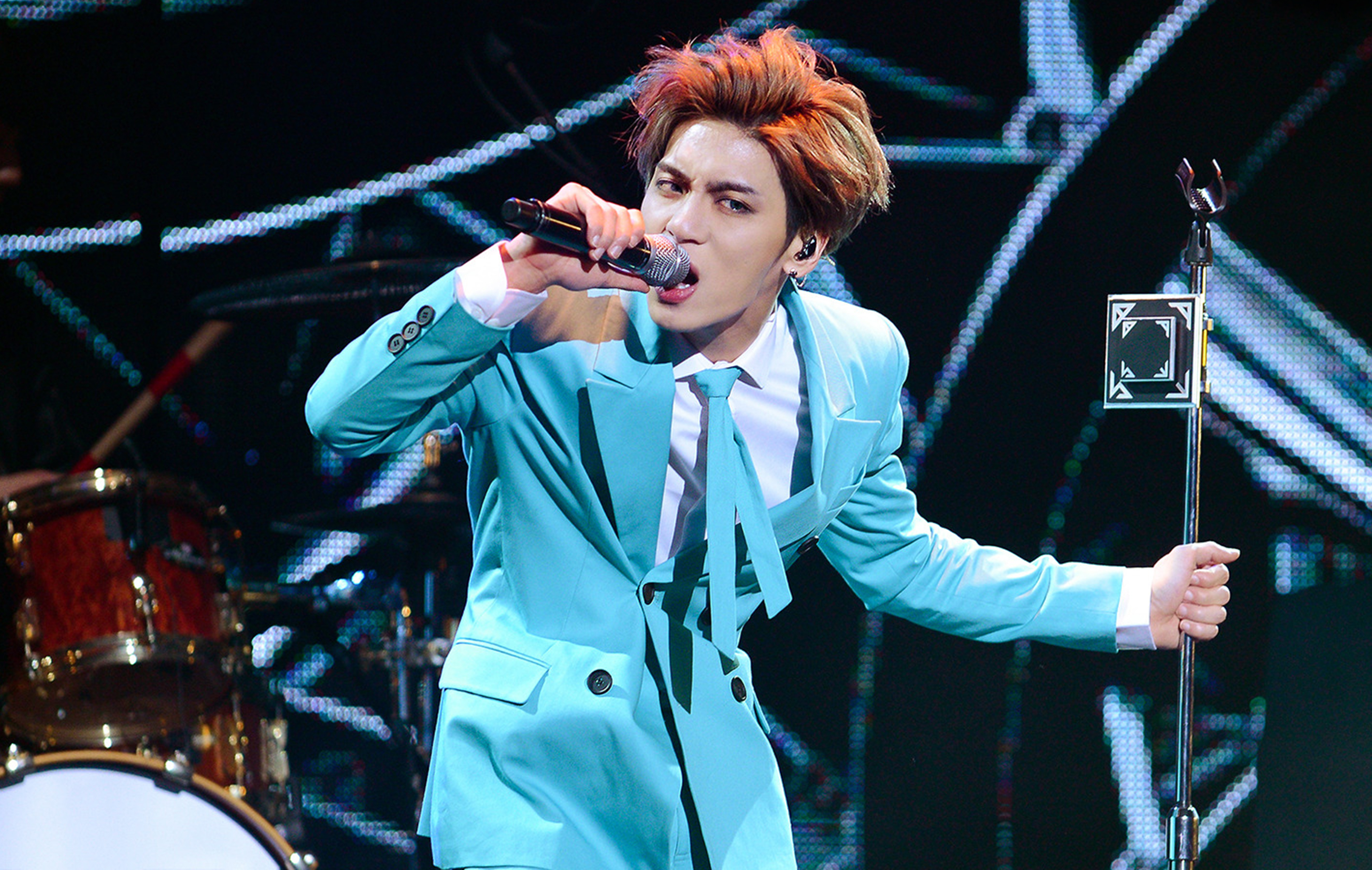
Jonghyun performing at the showcase for his debut album, Base, in January 2015.

On January 12, 2015, Jonghyun made his solo debut with his first EP, Base. The EP was promoted with two singles, "Deja-Boo" and "Crazy (Guilty Pleasure)". Jonghyun wrote the lyrics to every song on the EP, which featured collaborations with Zion.T, Younha, Wheesung and Iron. It peaked at number one on both the Billboard World Albums Chart and the Gaon Album Chart. On January 9, television network Mnet confirmed that Jonghyun would appear on the entertainment program 4 Things Show. Taemin, Davichi's Minkyung, and Zion.T appeared as Jonghyun's friends during the episode. In March 2015, Jonghyun composed and wrote the song "Playboy", which was included in Exo's second Korean album, Exodus. A month later, Lim Kim released "No More" on her third EP, Simple Mind, which was also composed and written by Jonghyun.

Jonghyun released a new compilation album of self-composed songs originally performed on his radio show MBC Blue Night. The compilation album, Story Op.1, was released on September 17, 2015. The following month, he held his first solo concert, The Story by Jonghyun, as part of SM Entertainment's concert series The Agit. He performed a total of 12 sold-out shows. Each concert featured a different guest, including Shinee's Onew and Taemin, IU, Zion.T, Jung-in, Lim Kim, Oksang Dalbit, Coffee Boy, Nine, Lee Ji-hyoung, Soran, and poet Ha Sang-wook.

Jonghyun appeared on the debut of the Mnet program Monthly Live Connection, which brought together two artists from different musical backgrounds to collaborate on one song. Jonghyun released the single "Elevator" on October 14 as part of the TV program. Following that, he collaborated with Soran's Go Young-bae in creating the single "I Guess Now It's the Fall", and with singer-songwriter Jung Joon-young in creating the single "Aewol". The same month, Jonghyun was selected as one of the top five K-pop idol vocalists by a survey completed by 40 anonymous music industry officials. Jonghyun published a novel, titled Skeleton Flower: Things That Have Been Released and Set Free, on November 19, after previously selling it in limited quantities at his concert. The book contains stories about songs written by Jonghyun, as well as photos that he took himself.

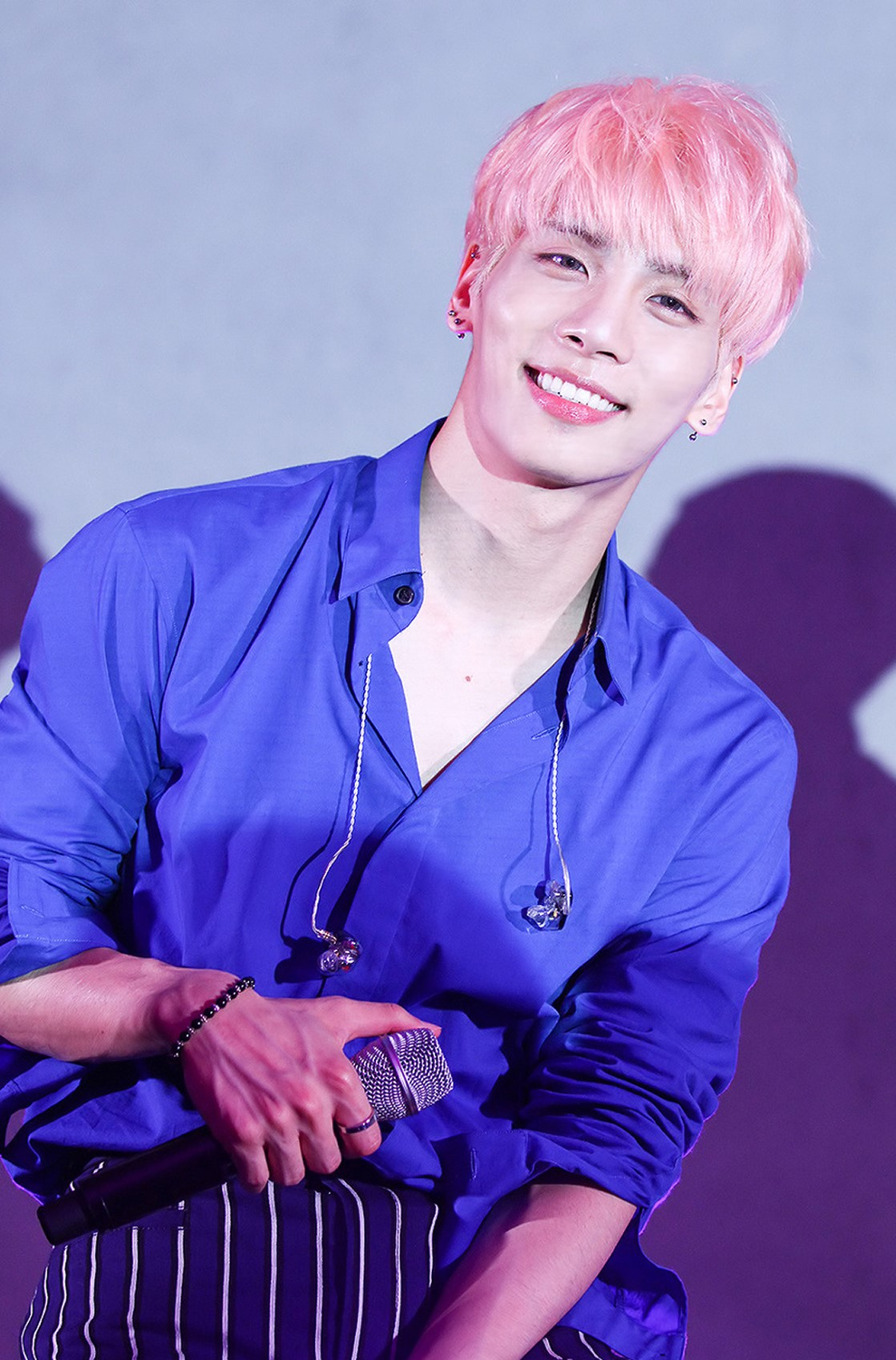
Jonghyun in 2016

Jonghyun composed and wrote the track "Already" for Taemin's first studio album, Press It, which was released in February 2016. He also composed and wrote a track called "Breathe" for Lee Hi's album Seoulite, which was released in March 2016. Jonghyun released a collaboration single with Heritage titled "Your Voice" on March 18, 2016, as part of SM Entertainment's SM Station project. On May 24, 2016, SM Entertainment released Jonghyun's first studio album, She Is, consisting of nine songs, most of which were written and composed by Jonghyun. The album spans various genres, including electro-funk, EDM, and R&B. Jonghyun said that "one can feel his passion as a singer-songwriter the most" on She Is. In December 2016, Jonghyun released another SM Station single titled "Inspiration". He held a series of concerts, titled Jonghyun – X – Inspiration, in Seoul and Busan, attracting 17,000 spectators.

=== 2017: Story Op.2 and Poet | Artist ===
On March 9, 2017, MBC confirmed that Jonghyun would leave his position as radio host at MBC Blue Night. The decision came after a lengthy discussion between Jonghyun and the show's staff, who stated, "It's disappointing, but because Shinee's Japanese and North American tour is about to start, he decided to leave." In an interview for Esquire, he described the experience as a turning point in his life. It was a space where he could explore new things, express himself and connect with the public on a deeper level: ''Before, I think I was more comfortable being "the singer Kim Jonghyun." [...] Because it was the one I [and the public] was used to. However, that changed when I started doing radio. As I started expressing my human side to others, I became [more] comfortable with the image of Kim Jonghyun that I revealed through radio.'' He also enjoyed the routine that came with hosting the midnight radio show. It gave him a sense of stability, which is rare in the entertainment industry.

He released his second compilation album, titled Story Op.2, on April 24, 2017. Jonghyun held a series of 20 concerts, titled The Agit (The Letter), between May and July 2017, at the SM Town Coex Artium in Seoul. Originally, only 12 concerts were planned, but Jonghyun decided to hold eight additional concerts after fans requested more performances. The concerts included songs from the album Story Op.2, and attracted 14,000 fans.

From December 9 to 10, 2017, Jonghyun held a concert titled Inspired at the SK Olympic Handball Gymnasium. Around the same time, Jonghyun was also working on his new album, which was set to be released in January 2018, and had also finished filming the music video for the lead track. The album, Poet | Artist, was eventually released posthumously on January 23, 2018, with all profits from the album sales to be given to Jonghyun's mother, in addition to establishing a foundation "to help those who are living in difficult circumstances". Poet | Artist debuted at number 177 on the Billboard 200 with 5,000 equivalent album units, making Jonghyun the fourth Korean soloist to appear on the chart, after BoA, G-Dragon and Taeyang. In 2025, Shinee released a new single album, also titled Poet | Artist. The lead single had been written by Jonghyun prior to his death, and features his vocals.

== Personal life ==
From October 2010 to June 2011, Jonghyun was in a relationship with actress Shin Se-kyung. The relationship was publicised by a group of reporters from South Korean media outlet Sports Seoul, who had been inspired by Western publications like TMZ and The Sun. The reporters followed the couple for a month before publishing pictures, marking the first time paparazzi tactics had been applied to South Korean celebrities. The photos went viral, almost crashing Sports Seoul's servers and resulting in enormous backlash from fans for both Jonghyun and Shin. The response inspired the reporters to break away from Sports Seoul and form a new publication, Dispatch, dedicated to breaking celebrity scandals.

In April 2013, Jonghyun was involved in a car accident and injured his nose. SM Entertainment reported that he had undergone surgery following the accident. He sat out most of his group's promotions for their third studio album, though he participated in the final week.

In December 2013, as a show of support towards a protest focused on shining light on South Korea's social inequality, Jonghyun changed his Twitter profile picture to an image of a message written by a transgender, bisexual student protester. It was a message that critiqued the country's cultural tightness, emphasis on social norms, and its discrimination against the LGBT community. Jonghyun also contacted the student and thanked her for speaking out and voicing her position that "different doesn't mean wrong". This show of support attracted responses from the public, both positive and negative. He received defamatory responses from Ilbe Storehouse members allegedly claiming to be members of Shinee's fanclub.

== Death and funeral ==
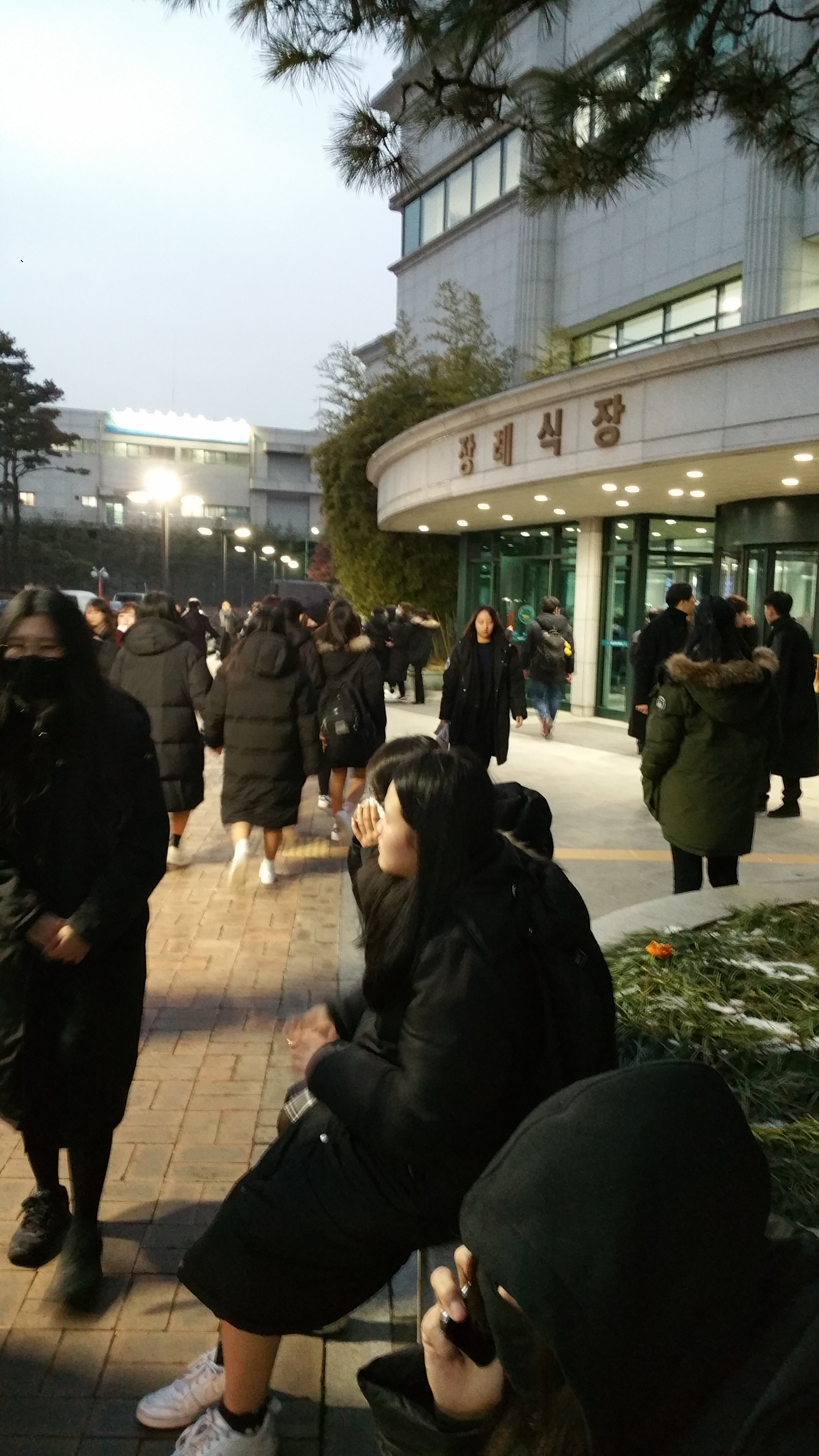
Fans mourn at Asan Medical Center Funeral Hall, December 20, 2017

In December 2017, Jonghyun rented an apartment in Cheongdam-dong, Gangnam District in southeastern Seoul for two days. He checked in at 12:00 p.m. KST on December 18, 2017. Later that day, at 4:42 p.m., Jonghyun's older sister, Kim So-dam, made an initial call to emergency responders, reporting that she believed he intended to kill himself, because he had sent her a number of messages on KakaoTalk with words such as "last goodbye" and "say I did well". He was last seen at a convenience store next to the apartment.

Jonghyun was found unconscious by the police and rescue workers at around 6:10 p.m. in the apartment he rented. He was immediately brought to Konkuk University Hospital in a state of cardiac arrest. He received emergency treatment, but failed to regain circulation and was pronounced dead at the hospital at around 6:32 p.m., aged 27. Investigators believe he died from inhaling either toxic fumes or smoke, as they discovered coal briquettes burnt on a frying pan upon arriving at the apartment. The police stated that, at the request of Jonghyun's family, a post-mortem would not be carried out, and they declared his death a probable suicide.

Jonghyun's funeral was held in Asan Medical Center's funeral hall in Pungnam-dong, Seoul, starting the afternoon of December 19. Celebrities, including BTS, IU, BoA, Girls' Generation, and Exo, and fans attended the three-day public funeral. Moreover, international fans also paid tribute to the singer around the world. On December 21, following the public funeral, Jonghyun was moved from the hospital to a private funeral attended only by his family and close friends, and was then buried in an undisclosed location.

Jonghyun's death was linked to depression by various media outlets. Following Jonghyun's death, fellow singer and friend Nine9, of the band Dear Cloud, posted on Instagram Jonghyun's suicide note which he had sent to her two or three days before his December 9 concert. The note referred to a "devouring" depression and his struggles with fame. Nine9 was alarmed by the note and was advised by her agency to keep in touch with Jonghyun. She had tried to help him, but this only "delayed" his death and "did not prevent it".

=== Aftermath ===
After Jonghyun's death, the hashtags "#StayStrongShawols" and "#YouDidWellJonghyun" became trending topics on Twitter. On December 30, 2017, Jonghyun debuted on Billboard's Social 50 chart at #2, with 425,000 Wikipedia views, a boost of 17,974 percent. Jonghyun's death opened discussions about the harsh and competitive nature of the entertainment business in South Korea, as well as mental health.

Jonghyun's single "Lonely" rose to the top of South Korea's online music stores. The song re-entered the country's national Gaon Digital Chart at number one, and the compilation album Story Op.2 ranked number seven on the Gaon Album Chart. His first album She Is charted at number four. The single and compilation album also ranked number six on Billboard's World Digital Song Sales chart and number five on its World Albums Chart. Moreover, Jonghyun's book Skeleton Flower was re-released and became a bestseller following his death.

Jonghyun's appearance on the variety show Night Goblin was scheduled to air on December 24, 2017, but JTBC decided not to broadcast it. Shinee was slated to have a series of concerts in Japan in February 2018, and after discussion, they decided to hold the concerts as scheduled.

=== Tributes ===
Many musicians and industry professionals around the world mourned Jonghyun's death. Labelmates Exo, Taeyeon, and TVXQ paid tribute to him at their concerts. SM Entertainment artists including Exo, Red Velvet, Super Junior, NCT 127, and JYP Entertainment's Got7 attended the year-end music shows wearing black ribbons with an aquamarine-colored "R.I.P. JH" embroidery.

MBC Radio planned on holding a special memorial broadcast for Jonghyun's long-running radio show, Blue Night, on December 21, but decided to cancel it due to "the possible social effects of [Jonghyun]'s voice going on air again." In addition, SM Entertainment commemorated Jonghyun's death with the release of "Dear My Family" as a charity single, posthumously featuring Jonghyun and other artists from the label. Moreover, SM Entertainment erected a memorial for Jonghyun at the Coex Artium from January 27 to April 30, 2018.

== Legacy ==
Jonghyun was the first artist to significantly participate in writing, organizing, and composing an album in SM Entertainment, a company known in the K-pop industry for limiting its artists' control over the production of their albums. Kim Da-hee of The Korea Times named Jonghyun one of four K-pop musicians who have distinguished themselves from the mass-produced singers in the idol industry, the other three being G-Dragon, Zico, and B1A4's Jinyoung, for their "exceptional talent in songwriting, producing and dancing, plus other abilities that make them successful musicians". Jonghyun's musical style was considered to be unique, and he received praise for writing and composing the majority of his solo tracks. Insight Korea mentioned him as one of seven idol group members who seemed to have been "born to make music".

== Discography ==
- She Is (2016)
- Poet | Artist (2018)

== Filmography ==
=== Film ===
Year	Title	Role	Notes	Ref.
2012	I Am	Himself	SM Town documentary	
2015	SM Town The Stage	Himself	SM Town concert film	

=== Radio ===
Year	Title	Role	Ref.
2014–2017	MBC Blue Night	Radio host	

== Bibliography ==
Year	Title	ISBN	Ref.
2015	Skeleton Flower: Things That Have Been Released and Set Free	ISBN 978-8996955481	

== Concerts ==
=== Headlining ===
- The Story by Jonghyun (2015)
- Jonghyun – X – Inspiration (2016)
- The Agit (The Letter) (2017)
- Inspired (2017)

== Achievements ==
=== Awards and nominations ===
Name of the award ceremony, year presented, category, nominee of the award, and the result of the nomination
Award ceremony	Year	Category	Nominated work	Result	Ref.
Gaon Chart Music Awards	2019	Album of the Year – 1st Quarter	Poet | Artist	Nominated	
Golden Disc Awards	2016	Disk Bonsang	Base	Won	
Golden Disc Awards	2016	Disk Daesang	Base	Nominated	
Golden Disc Awards	2016	Digital Bonsang	"Déjà-Boo"	Nominated	
Golden Disc Awards	2017	Disk Bonsang	She Is	Nominated	
Golden Disc Awards	2019	Disc Bonsang	Poet | Artist	Won	
Golden Disc Awards	2019	Disc Daesang	Poet | Artist	Nominated	
Golden Disc Awards	2019	Special Disk Bonsang Fans Choice	—N/a	Won	
Golden Disc Awards	2019	Popularity Award	—N/a	Nominated	
MBC Entertainment Awards	2015	Excellence Award – Radio	Blue Night Radio	Won	
Melon Music Awards	2015	Best Dance – Male	"Déjà-Boo"	Nominated	
Mnet Asian Music Awards	2015	Best Male Artist	—N/a	Nominated	
Soompi Awards	2018	Hallyu Special Award	—N/a	Won	
