= Poet Artist (Jonghyun album) =

2018 album by Jonghyun

Poet | Artist

Studio album by Jonghyun
- Released: January 23, 2018
- Recorded: 2017
- Studios: SM Studios, Seoul, South Korea
- Genres: R&B; soul; electronic
- Length: 36:37
- Language: Korean
- Label: SM
- Producers: Jonghyun; Imlay

Jonghyun chronology
| The Collection: Story Op.2 (2017) | Poet | Artist (2018) |

Singles from Poet | Artist
- 1. "Shinin'" Released: January 23, 2018; 2. "Before Our Spring" Released: January 24, 2018

Poet | Artist is the second and final studio album by South Korean singer-songwriter Jonghyun, released posthumously on January 23, 2018, through SM Entertainment.

The album had been confirmed in December 2017 and was completed prior to Jonghyun's death, of which it was announced a day after. Upon release, the album debuted at number 177 on the US Billboard 200, the album being his first to chart on the list.

== Background and release ==
In early November 2017, Jonghyun announced a two-date concert in Seoul's SK Olympic Handball Gymnasium. The concert, titled Inspired, was held in Seoul on December 9 and 10. His teleprompter included an announcement for his upcoming studio album, but he ignored it at the time. On December 18, it was reported that Jonghyun had died. The following day, his record label SM announced that he had recently completed his second studio album and filmed a music video. The album's title and release date were announced on January 19, 2018, and the tracklist on January 22. Poet | Artist was released digitally on January 23 and the physical edition was released on January 24.

All album proceeds will be going to Jonghyun's mother to create a foundation for people living under difficult circumstances.

== Composition ==
The album has been described as an electropop, R&B and future bass album, with elements of trap.

== Promotion ==
Songs were teased during Inspired, where he performed "Take the Dive", "I'm So Curious", and "Only One You Need", the latter of which was about comforting others after the loss of a loved one. "#Hashtag" was featured in a concert intermission video, while "Rewind" appeared in an intermission video from the concert The Agit: The Letter. "Shinin'" and its respective music video were released on January 23, 2018. The music video for "Before Our Spring" was released the following day on January 24.

== Reception ==
=== Commercial ===
Poet | Artist debuted atop the Gaon Album Chart on the 4th issued week, dated January 21–27. The following week it dropped one spot, where it spent an additional week. On the 51st issued week, dated December 16–22, the album returned to number one, coinciding with one year since the singer passed. The album spent 36 non-consecutive weeks in the chart's top 100. Poet | Artist also topped the monthly Gaon Album Chart, selling more than 150,000 copies in eight days. It eventually became the 20th best-selling album in 2018, moving more than 235,000 copies. Eight of the album's eleven songs charted on the Gaon Digital Chart. The album's first single "Shinin'" debuted at no. five. On February 11, 2021, the album received a platinum certification from Gaon for 250,000 copies sold.

In Japan, Poet | Artist debuted at no. twelve on the Oricon Albums Chart for the week dated February 5, selling around 6,000 copies. The following week the album rose to no. ten on the chart, selling an additional 6,700 copies. In the United States, the album debuted and peaked at no. 177 on the Billboard 200, making Jonghyun only the fourth Korean soloist to place an album on the chart at the time. In its opening week it moved 5,000 album-equivalent units, including 4,000 pure sales. It furthermore debuted atop Billboard's World Albums, his second number-one on the chart.

=== Critical ===
Poet | Artist was met with positive reviews by music critics. Writing for Billboard, Tamar Herman described the album as a "farewell and a sonic walk down memory lane". Billboard ranked the album as the second best K-pop album released in 2018, behind BTS' Love Yourself: Answer. Jeff Benjamin wrote that the album is "beautiful" and a "bittersweet reminder of the beloved singer, songwriter and producer's incredible talents." Riddhi Chakraborty of Rolling Stone India called Poet | Artist "bittersweet–awe-inspiring in its detail, finesse and lyrical impact, but also a reminder that there never will be anyone quite like Jonghyun," and also ranked it as the second best K-pop album of 2018. Reviewing for The Jakarta Post, Marcel Thee wrote that the record is a "tragic-reminder of his talents as both a musician and producer". At the 33rd Golden Disc Awards, the album was nominated for the Disc Daesang and Disc Bonsang awards, winning the latter.

"#Hashtag" received media attention for discussing gossip and slanderous comments on the Internet and was praised for both its lyrical content and Jonghyun's use of wordplay.

Shortly after the album's release, KBS banned "Rewind" from its radio stations for containing lyrics in Japanese.

Awards and nominations for Poet | Artist
| Award ceremony | Year | Category | Result | Ref. |
|---|---|---|---|---|
| Gaon Chart Music Awards | 2019 | Album of the Year – 1st Quarter | Nominated | |
| Golden Disc Awards | 2019 | Disc Bonsang | Won | |
| Golden Disc Awards | 2019 | Disc Daesang | Nominated | |

== Track listing ==
All lyrics are written by Jonghyun, except where noted.

Poet | Artist track listing
| No. | Title | Lyrics | Music | Arrangement | Length |
|---|---|---|---|---|---|
| 1. | "Shinin'" (Korean: 빛이 나; RR: Bichi na) | | Jonghyun; Megatone; Score | Jonghyun; Megatone; Score | 2:52 |
| 2. | "Only One You Need" (Korean: 환상통; RR: Hwansangtong; lit. 'Phantom Pain') | | Blizman; Christian Parris; Daniel Klein; Kendrick Dean | Blasian Chris; Jakob Mihoubi; G.bliz; Kendrick Dean; MZMC; Rudi Daouk | 3:39 |
| 3. | "#Hashtag" (Korean: 와플; RR: Wapeul; lit. 'Waffle') | | Jonghyun; Imlay; Jin Soh | Jonghyun; Imlay; Jin Soh | 3:05 |
| 4. | "Grease" (Korean: 기름때; RR: Gireumttae) | | Jonghyun; Jake K. | Jonghyun; Jake K. | 3:19 |
| 5. | "Take the Dive" | Seo Ji-eum | Christian Fast; Ellen Berg Tollbom; Marcus Lindberg; Royal Dive | Royal Dive | 2:54 |
| 6. | "Sightseeing" (Korean: 사람 구경 중; RR: Saram gugyeong jung; lit. 'People Watching') | | Jonghyun; Jake K.; Jin Soh | Jonghyun; Jake K.; Jin Soh | 3:04 |
| 7. | "Rewind" | | Jonghyun; Imlay | Jonghyun; Imlay | 3:36 |
| 8. | "Just For a Day" (Korean: 하루만이라도; RR: Harumanirado) | Jeon Gandi | Chris Wahle | Chris Wahle | 2:50 |
| 9. | "I'm So Curious" (Korean: 어떤 기분이 들까; RR: Eotteon gibuni deulkka; lit. 'What Would It Feel Like') | | Jonghyun; Imlay; Jin Suk Choi | Jonghyun; Imlay; Jin Suk Choi | 3:24 |
| 10. | "Sentimental" | | Jonghyun; Jake K. | Jonghyun; Jake K. | 3:26 |
| 11. | "Before Our Spring" (Korean: 우린 봄이 오기 전에; RR: Urin bomi ogi jeone) | | Jonghyun; Wefreaky | Jonghyun; Wefreaky | 4:06 |
| Total length: | | | | | 36:21 |

== Charts ==
=== Weekly charts ===
Weekly chart performance for Poet | Artist
| Chart (2018) | Peak position |
|---|---|
| Australian Digital Albums (ARIA) | 20 |
| Australian Hitseekers Albums (ARIA) | 4 |
| Belgian Albums (Ultratop Flanders) | 166 |
| French Download Albums (SNEP) | 34 |
| Japan Hot Albums (Billboard Japan) | 7 |
| Japanese Albums (Oricon) | 10 |
| New Zealand Heatseeker Albums (RMNZ) | 5 |
| South Korean Albums (Gaon) | 1 |
| UK Album Downloads (Official Charts) | 31 |
| UK Independent Albums (Official Charts) | 21 |
| US Billboard 200 | 177 |
| US Independent Albums (Billboard) | 7 |
| US World Albums (Billboard) | 1 |

=== Year-end charts ===
Year-end chart performance for Poet | Artist
| Chart (2018) | Position |
|---|---|
| South Korean Albums (Gaon) | 20 |

== Certifications and sales ==
Certifications and sales for Poet | Artist
| Region | Certification | Certified units/sales |
|---|---|---|
| Japan | — | 14,750 |
| South Korea (KMCA) | Platinum | 250,000^{^} |
| United States | — | 5,000 |
^{^} Shipments figures based on certification alone.
