= Story Op.2 =

The Collection: Story Op.2
- Digital and Photo version cover.

Compilation album by Jonghyun
- Released: April 24, 2017
- Language: Korean
- Label: SM; KT Music

Jonghyun chronology
She Is (2016)	The Collection: Story Op.2 (2017)	Poet | Artist (2018)

The Collection series chronology
The Collection: Story Op.1 (2015)	The Collection: Story Op.2 (2017)

Singles from The Collection: Story Op.2
- 1. "Lonely (feat. Taeyeon)" Released: April 24, 2017

The Collection: Story Op.2 (Korean: 소품집: 이야기 Op.2; RR: Sopumjip: iyagi Op.2) is the second compilation album by South Korean singer-songwriter Jonghyun, following his first compilation album Story Op.1. It was released on April 24, 2017, by SM Entertainment, and was the last album to be released during Jonghyun's lifetime.

== Background ==
Jonghyun's first compilation album Story Op.1 was released in 2015, consisting of songs Jonghyun had written for his radio show Blue Night. On April 18, 2017, SM Entertainment announced that the follow-up, Story Op.2, would be released digitally on April 24, with a physical release the next day.

Story Op.2 contains five previously released songs. Four of these songs ("1000", "Just Chill", "Love is So Nice", "Our Season") were initially revealed between July–October 2016 during the "Man Who Composes" corner on Jonghyun's Blue Night radio broadcasts. Another previously released track ("Elevator") was revealed on the second episode of Mnet's Monthly Live Connection in 2015 and later released online. Rearranged versions were included on the album, in addition to five new tracks. All of the songs were written by Jonghyun.

The lead single "Lonely" is a duet with Girls' Generation member Taeyeon. Jonghyun and Taeyeon had previously collaborated in 2014 as a part of their record label's project SM The Ballad with the Korean-language version of the song "Breath".

== Composition ==
The album is structured according to the flow of the four seasons. Lead single "Lonely" is a midtempo piano ballad with a "soft, snapping beat" and "twinkling synths". It describes feelings of intense loneliness. "1000" features acoustic guitar and romantic lyrics. "Just Chill" was inspired by Jonghyun's inability to take a break and rest. "Love is So Nice" belongs to the R&B genre. "Blinking Game" is a jazz song about the intimacy of making eye contact with a lover. "Elevator" is a ballad with a piano-guided melody, stripped back production and strings. In the lyrics, Jonghyun describes not being able to meet his eyes in the elevator mirror due to deep self-loathing and loneliness. "Let Me Out" is a "guttural" power ballad with anguished lyrics. It alternates between heavier and softer moments, and features "heavily Auto-Tuned belts and piercing high notes" over "throbbing beats, distorted strings, and grating synths". "Fireplace" is a neo soul song about a painful break-up. "Our Season" is a midtempo pop song that describes Jonghyun's affection for winter and its unexpected warmth. Bonus track "Where Are You" is a humorous song in which Jonghyun bemoans his lack of a romantic partner, complaining that even cockroaches have lovers, but not him.

== Promotion and reception ==
A music video for "Lonely" was released simultaneously with the album. Jonghyun did not promote on music shows, but performed "Lonely" with Taeyeon on You Hee-yeol's Sketchbook. He performed songs from the album at his concert The Agit: The Letter in May–July 2017.

Story Op.2 debuted at number two on South Korea's Gaon Album Chart. It was the sixth best-selling album of April 2017, selling over 37,000 copies. In the United States, Story Op.2 debuted at number seven on the Billboard World Albums chart, becoming Jonghyun's fourth top ten entry. Following Jonghyun's death in December 2017, it re-entered the Gaon Album Chart at number ten, and achieved a new peak of number five on World Albums, selling almost 1,000 copies in the week ending December 21.

== Track listing ==
All lyrics are written by Jonghyun.

Story Op.2 track listing
No.	Title	Music	Arrangement	Length
1.	"Lonely" (feat. Taeyeon)	Jonghyun; Wefreaky; MonoTree; Imlay	Jonghyun; Wefreaky; MonoTree; Imlay	4:04
2.	"1000"	Jonghyun; Wefreaky	Jonghyun; Wefreaky	4:01
3.	"Just Chill" (멍하니 있어; Meonghani isseo; 'Staring Into Space')	Jonghyun; Wefreaky; Imlay	Jonghyun; Wefreaky; Imlay	3:25
4.	"Love is So Nice"	Jonghyun; Wefreaky; Imlay	Jonghyun; Wefreaky; Imlay	3:27
5.	"Blinking Game" (눈싸움; Nunssaum)	Jonghyun; Wefreaky; E-Nail	Jonghyun; Wefreaky; E-Nail	3:36
6.	"Elevator" (엘리베이터)	Jonghyun; Wefreaky	Wefreaky; Philtre (Jang Jae-won)	3:44
7.	"Let Me Out" (놓아줘; Noajwo)	Jonghyun; Wefreaky; Score	Jonghyun; Wefreaky; Score	4:24
8.	"Fireplace" (벽난로; Byeongnallo)	Jonghyun; Wefreaky; Score	Jonghyun; Wefreaky; Score	4:22
9.	"Our Season" (따뜻한 겨울; Ttatteuthan gyeoul; 'Warm Winter')	Jonghyun; Wefreaky; Shin Hyun-jin	Score	4:03
Total length:				35:06

Story Op.2 – Physical edition (bonus track)
No.	Title	Music	Arrangement	Length
10.	"Where Are You" (바퀴; Bakwi; 'Cockroach')	Jonghyun; Wefreaky	Jonghyun; Wefreaky	4:07
Total length:				39:13

== Charts ==
=== Weekly charts ===
Chart performance for Story Op.2
Chart (2017)	Peak position
Japanese Albums (Oricon)	30
Japan Hot Albums (Billboard Japan)	34
South Korean Albums (Gaon)	2
US World Albums (Billboard)	5

=== Monthly charts ===
Monthly chart performance for Story Op.2
Chart (2017)	Peak position
South Korean Albums (Gaon)	6

=== Year-end charts ===
Year-end chart performance for Story Op.2
Chart (2017)	Position
South Korean Albums (Gaon)	92

== Release history ==
Release history and formats for Story Op.2
Region	Date	Format	Label	Ref.
Various	April 24, 2017	Digital download; streaming	SM	
South Korea	April 25, 2017	CD	SM; KT Music	
