= She Is =

Studio album by Jonghyun
- Released: May 24, 2016
- Genres: R&B; soul; dance; neo soul
- Length: 29:52
- Language: Korean
- Labels: SM; KT Music
- Producer: Jonghyun

Jonghyun chronology
The Collection: Story Op.1 (2015)	She Is (2016)	The Collection: Story Op.2 (2017)

Singles from She Is
- 1. "She Is" Released: May 24, 2016

Music video
- "She Is" on YouTube

She Is (Korean: 좋아; RR: Joa) is the debut studio album by South Korean singer-songwriter Jonghyun. It was released on May 24, 2016, by SM Entertainment and distributed by KT Music, and is the only studio album to be released during Jonghyun's lifetime. The album was commercially successful, reaching number one on South Korea's Gaon Album Chart, and received acclaim from music critics. It was nominated for an Album Bonsang at the 31st Golden Disc Awards.

== Background and release ==
Jonghyun released the album through a variety of music sites on May 24 and officially began promotions with his appearance on Mnet's M Countdown on May 26. The album consists of nine songs and is described by Jonghyun as the album where one "can feel his passion as a singer-songwriter" and covers various genres such as electro-funk, EDM and R&B. Eight out of the nine songs are composed by the artist himself. Jonghyun's fashion style for the promotions reflect elements of Shinee's known trend, including colourful outfits and skinny jeans, demonstrating a 1990s-inspired look.

== Composition ==
Jonghyun decided to emphasise storytelling on this album, adopting the persona of a "sweet, witty and sly" man who has fallen in love. Each song is from the perspective of this character. He cited Prince, Jamiroquai and Maxwell as musical influences. The lead single, "She Is", is an electro-funk song with future bass elements. It contains a repetitive melody and lyrics so the listener can easily sing along. "White T-Shirt" is an uptempo song that blends tropical house with urban pop and features a country-style piano melody. In "Orbit", Jonghyun uses space imagery to portray a romantic relationship; he describes himself orbiting his lover like a celestial object. "Moon" is a "dreamy" yet "sensual" electro R&B song that was inspired by a lucid dream. "Aurora" belongs to the neo soul genre. "Dress Up" is an uptempo EDM track that contains distorted vocals, synths, and "thumping electro-hip-hop beats". "Cocktail" is an R&B ballad in which Jonghyun compares falling for his lover's charms to drinking a cocktail. "Red" is an urban R&B song that was inspired by traffic lights. Jonghyun described the song "Suit Up" as being about the "first night after marriage." It is a downtempo R&B song influenced by future bass.

== Commercial performance ==
In South Korea, She Is entered and peaked atop the Gaon Album Chart on the chart issue dated May 22–28, 2016. The album spent a total of three weeks in the top 10 of the chart and a total of five weeks in the top 100. In the US, She Is entered and peaked at number four on Billboard's World Albums during the week of June 11, 2016, being the highest ranking debut of the week. On the same week, the album entered and peaked at number 20 on Billboard's Heatseekers Albums. She Is entered at number eight on the Gaon Album Chart for the month of May 2016 with a total of 45,415 copies sold. For the month of June 2016, the album placed at number 10 with 10,574 copies sold. The album has sold 90,790 copies since release.

== Critical reception ==
She Is was met with positive reviews by music critics. Taylor Glasby of i-D labelled it one of the best releases of the year, praising it as "a remarkably cohesive experience that's both mature—such as the gloriously sensual track "Moon"—yet playfully able to pack the dancefloor ("White T-shirt")". IZM critic Jo Hae-ram noted that Jonghyun utilised his voice like an instrument to embody the character of each song; in "She Is", he changes his tone to match the electro-funk beat, while in "Orbit", his pronunciation is deliberately slurred and sticky. Jo described the album as a "masterpiece of contemporary R&B", concluding that the "idol" label can be removed from Jonghyun. Writing for Weiv, Mimyo felt that the organic integration of future bass and future R&B elements placed the album one step ahead of mainstream pop music. He stated, "This album may be a rediscovery of a singer-songwriter whose strength is that he started out as an idol". Kim Hak-seon of The Hankyoreh praised the album's consistency and was impressed by the collaborations with songwriters such as Deez. He situated it within the wider context of idol songwriting, arguing that Jonghyun was the artist who best exemplified the growing trend for idols to write their own music. According to Billboard, "a sense of vibrancy permeates each listen of Jonghyun's first LP, offering up a kaleidoscopic listening experience that is part sunshine, part desire, and all good." They named it one of the best K-pop albums of the 2010s.

== Track listing ==
All lyrics are written by Jonghyun.

She Is track listing
No.	Title	Music	Arrangement	Length
1.	"She Is" (좋아; Joa; 'I Like It')	Jonghyun; Crush; Philtre; Wefreaky	Philtre	03:11
2.	"White T-Shirt"	Henrik Meinke; Jonas Kalisch; Alexsej Vlasenko; Jeremy Chacon; Ilanguaq Lumholt; Marcus Winther	Meinke; Kalisch; Vlasenko; Chacon; Lumholt; Winther	02:58
3.	"Orbit" (우주가 있어; Ujuga isseo; 'There's a Universe')	Jonghyun; Wefreaky; Coach & Sendo	Coach & Sendo; Wefreaky	03:17
4.	"Moon"	Jonghyun; LDN Noise; Adrian McKinnon	LDN Noise	02:44
5.	"Aurora"	Jonghyun; Deez	Deez	03:54
6.	"Dress Up"	Jonghyun; LDN Noise	LDN Noise	03:05
7.	"Cocktail"	Jonghyun; Bryan-Michael Cox; Clifford Henson	Cox; Henson	03:39
8.	"Red"	Jonghyun; Wefreaky; Ryan Kim; Chase	Im Kwang-ok; Kim; Chase	03:14
9.	"Suit Up"	Jonghyun; Wefreaky; Score	Score; Wefreaky	03:50
Total length:				29:52

== Charts ==
=== Weekly charts ===
Chart performance for She Is
Chart (2016)	Peak position
Japanese Albums (Oricon)	21
Japan Hot Albums (Billboard Japan)	23
South Korean Albums (Gaon)	1
US Heatseekers Albums (Billboard)	20
US World Albums (Billboard)	4

=== Monthly charts ===
Monthly chart performance for She Is
Chart (2016)	Peak position
South Korean Albums (Gaon)	8

=== Year-end charts ===
Year-end chart performance for She Is
Chart (2016)	Position
South Korean Albums (Gaon)	52

== Awards and nominations ==
Music program wins
Song	Program	Date	Ref.
"She Is"	The Show	May 31, 2016	
"She Is"	Show Champion	June 1, 2016	

== Release history ==
Release history and formats for She Is
Region	Date	Format	Label	Ref.
South Korea	May 24, 2016	CD; Digital download; streaming	SM Entertainment; KT Music	
Various	May 24, 2016	Digital download; streaming	SM Entertainment	
Taiwan	July 1, 2016	CD	Avex Taiwan	
