= Base (EP) =

EP by Jonghyun
- Released: January 12, 2015
- Genres: R&B; soul
- Length: 28:22
- Language: Korean
- Label: SM
- Producer: Jonghyun

Jonghyun chronology
Base (2015)	The Collection: Story Op.1 (2015)

Singles from Base
- 1. "Déjà-Boo" Released: January 7, 2015; 2. "Crazy (Guilty Pleasure)" Released: January 12, 2015

Music video
- "Déjà-Boo" on YouTube "Crazy (Guilty Pleasure)" on YouTube

Base is the debut and only extended play (EP) by South Korean singer-songwriter Jonghyun, released on January 12, 2015 by SM Entertainment. The EP consists of seven tracks and features collaborations with various artists, such as Zion.T, Younha, Wheesung and Iron. Jonghyun penned the lyrics to every song on the EP. The EP was commercially successful, debuting at number one on South Korea's Gaon Album Chart. It won the Disk Bonsang at the 30th Golden Disc Awards.

== Background ==
Jonghyun was the second member of boy band Shinee to debut as a soloist, following his bandmate Taemin. The title, Base, was chosen for its similarity to Taemin's solo debut, Ace (2014). Jonghyun said that he wanted to maintain continuity with the other Shinee members. Jonghyun also played the bass in his high school band. The same rhyme scheme was later adopted by the remaining Shinee members; Key named his solo debut album Face (2018), followed by Onew with Voice (2018) and Minho with Chase (2022). Describing the EP, Jonghyun told the media at a showcase:

To be honest, I am not confident in singing ballad songs. Fans have loved my ballads in the past, but I am not really good at singing them. For this album, I focused on introducing my style of music and what I would like to pursue in my musical career. I wanted to make an album filled with songs I like, and work with musicians who inspired me. When deciding who to collaborate with for this album, I chose artists who can express the songs best.

== Production ==
Jonghyun wrote lyrics for all the songs on the EP, and composed five of them himself: "Déjà-Boo", "Love Belt", "Neon", "Beautiful Tonight" and "Fortune Cookie". The EP was written over a period of several years, with the oldest song dating to around four years before release and the newest song one year. It was recorded while he was touring Japan with Shinee. Jonghyun collaborated with various artists, such as Younha, Wheesung, Zion.T and Iron.

"Déjà-Boo" was co-produced by Zion.T, who also features on the track. Jonghyun wanted "Déjà-Boo" to have a "hip hop feel" and wrote the song with Zion.T in mind. He changed the melody to fit his voice once his participation was confirmed. Iron was featured on "Crazy (Guilty Pleasure)" at his company's suggestion after he elected to include rap in the song. "Hallelujah" was co-written with Wheesung, Jonghyun's idol and the first person he contacted for the EP. Jonghyun wanted a female vocalist for "Love Belt", and opted for Younha after listening to the Epik High song "We Fight Ourselves", on which she features. He said the song would not have been included if she hadn't agreed to participate. "Beautiful Tonight" was composed as early as 2012 and was inspired by the view of the moon as Jonghyun was walking home from work one night. He felt that it was the most complete of all the songs he had written.

== Composition ==
"Déjà-Boo" is described as a "retro funk song with a synthesizer comping melody and the funk rhythm of a bass". It has "silky disco guitars" and "thick vocal harmonies". "Crazy (Guilty Pleasure)" is a midtempo retro pop song containing neo soul and funk influences. Also described as alternative R&B, it features heavy bass, strings, and filtered keys. "Hallelujah" incorporates gospel, inspired by R. Kelly, with a "choral-infused refrain". It has "stilted beats" and "high-toned piano". Influenced by R&B and soul, it is a romantic song in which Jonghyun thanks his partner for being born, and the lyrics reference Wheesung's 2012 song "Masterpiece of You", which expresses love and reverence for women. "Love Belt" is an "emotional" midtempo R&B song featuring "languid" vocals and a string quartet. It uses a seat belt as a metaphor for two lovers holding onto each other tightly to relieve anxiety. "Neon" is a midtempo R&B song that contains layered, overlapping vocals and a Dilla break in the bridge. "Mono-Drama" compares feelings of unrequited love to a monodrama. It is a midtempo R&B track with the trademark strong beat and chord development of The Underdogs, who produced the song. Bonus track "Beautiful Tonight" is an urban soul song with a whistling melody. It is about wanting to spend extra time with a lover instead of letting them go home for the night. Finally, "Fortune Cookie", which is exclusive to the CD version, is a neo soul song with a broken beat. The song's title references a "credit cookie", or post-credits scene, which appears after the closing credits of a film.

== Release and reception ==
The EP was promoted with two singles: "Déjà-Boo" and "Crazy (Guilty Pleasure)". "Déjà-Boo", which served as a pre-release, was released on January 7. On January 8, Jonghyun played "Love Belt" on his MBC radio show Blue Night. He held a showcase to introduce the EP at the SM Town Coex Artium. The official music video for the lead single, "Crazy (Guilty Pleasure)", was released on the same day. The concept of the music video reflects the name of the song, "guilty pleasure", and depicts Jonghyun as a man who is "head over heels for an alluring woman". It was filmed using a Phantom camera. Jonghyun started his official album promotions on KBS' Music Bank on January 9. The EP was released on January 12, alongside "Crazy (Guilty Pleasure)".

Base debuted at number one on South Korea's Gaon Album Chart. It debuted at number two on Billboard's World Albums chart, rising to number one the following week. It was the first number one for a K-pop artist in 2015 and the first solo number one for a Shinee member on a Billboard chart. Jonghyun's music video for "Crazy (Guilty Pleasure)" was the most watched K-pop video in America and in the world for January 2015. The music video for "Déjà-Boo" ranked sixth on both lists. Base sold over 72,000 copies in South Korea in 2015. It won the Disk Bonsang at the 30th Golden Disc Awards.

== Track listing ==
All lyrics are written by Jonghyun, except where noted.

Base track listing
No.	Title	Lyrics	Music	Arrangement	Length
1.	"Déjà-Boo" (데자-부; Deja-bu) (featuring Zion.T)		Jonghyun; Zion.T; Wefreaky	Philtre	3:29
2.	"Crazy (Guilty Pleasure)" (featuring Iron)	Jonghyun; Iron	Uwe Fahrenkrog-Petersen; Jean Beauvoir; Anne Judith Wik; Robin Jenssen; Martin Mulholland	Uwe Fahrenkrog-Petersen; Jean Beauvoir; Anne Judith Wik; Robin Jenssen; Martin Mulholland	3:41
3.	"Hallelujah" (할렐루야; Hallelluya)	Jonghyun; Wheesung	Im Gwang-ok; Martin Mulholland; Nermin Harambasic	James "Keyz" Foye; Im	3:18
4.	"Love Belt" (featuring Younha)		Jonghyun; Wefreaky	Score	3:31
5.	"Neon"		Jonghyun; Deez	Deez	3:29
6.	"Mono-Drama" (일인극; Iringeuk)		The Underdogs; Eric Dawkins	The Underdogs; Dawkins	4:14
7.	"Beautiful Tonight" (시간이 늦었어; Sigani neujeosseo; lit. 'It's Late') (Bonus track)		Jonghyun; Sojin	Lee Yoon-jae	3:50
8.	"Fortune Cookie" (포춘쿠키; Pochunkuki) (CD-only track)		Jonghyun; Oh Joon-hyuk	Hitchhiker	2:42
Total length:					28:14

== Charts ==
=== Weekly charts ===
Weekly chart performance for Base
Chart (2015)	Peak position
Japanese Albums (Oricon)	14
South Korean Albums (Gaon)	1
US Heatseekers Albums (Billboard)	20
US World Albums (Billboard)	1

=== Monthly charts ===
Monthly chart performance for Base
Chart (2015)	Peak position
South Korean Albums (Gaon)	2

=== Year-end charts ===
Year-end chart performance for Base
Chart (2015)	Position
South Korean Albums (Gaon)	35

== Awards and nominations ==
Music program awards
Song	Music show	Date	Ref.
"Déjà-Boo"	Show! Music Core	January 17, 2015	
"Déjà-Boo"	Show! Music Core	January 24, 2015	
"Déjà-Boo"	Inkigayo	January 18, 2015	
"Déjà-Boo"	The Show	January 20, 2015	
"Déjà-Boo"	The Show	January 27, 2015	
"Déjà-Boo"	Show Champion	January 21, 2015	
"Déjà-Boo"	M Countdown	January 22, 2015	
"Déjà-Boo"	Music Bank	January 23, 2015	

== Release history ==
Release history and formats for Base
Region	Date	Format	Label
South Korea	January 12, 2015	CD; digital download; streaming	SM Entertainment
Various	January 12, 2015	Digital download; streaming	SM Entertainment
