= Story Op.1 =

The Collection: Story Op.1

Compilation album by Jonghyun
- Released: September 17, 2015
- Genre: R&B; soul; ballad
- Length: 32:23
- Language: Korean
- Label: SM; KT Music

Jonghyun chronology
Base (2015)	The Collection: Story Op.1 (2015)	She Is (2016)

The Collection series chronology
The Collection: Story Op.1 (2015)	The Collection: Story Op.2 (2016)

Singles from Story Op.1
- 1. "End of a Day" Released: September 17, 2015

Music video
- "End of a day" on YouTube

The Collection: Story Op.1 (Korean: 소품집: 이야기 Op.1; RR: Sopumjip: iyagi Op.1) is the first compilation album by South Korean singer-songwriter Jonghyun, released on September 17, 2015, by SM Entertainment, following his solo debut with the extended play Base on January 12. The album was not promoted on music shows.

== Background ==
As I started Blue Night, I contemplated on how to incorporate myself well into the program... As expected, the conclusion is communicating with listeners and music! That's why I have prepared a project where I personally write a song pertaining to a listener's story and let you hear it. The name of the corner is "Blue Night Lyrics, That Man's Composition". It won't be aired every week, but it will be aired once every few months as a special corner, so please send in a lot of stories, I'm accepting stories through the homepage.

All the songs from the release were previously revealed on Jonghyun's radio show Blue Night between July 2014 and July 2015 in demo form, and rearranged versions were included on the album. "End of a Day" was the lead single of the album, which was released on September 17, 2015. The music video stars Ryohei Otani.

== Composition ==
"Like You" first played on Blue Night on July 8, 2014. The song is based on a story submitted by a male listener who describes being in love with someone but hasn't properly confessed. Jonghyun wrote the song from the listener's perspective, guessing the feelings of the person he likes. "I'm Sorry" was broadcast on July 10, 2014. The song is based on a story submitted by a woman who describes feeling uneasy after being unable to reply to an e-mail from her ex-boyfriend. Jonghyun wrote the lyrics based on the woman's feelings, as he felt the listener "has these feelings of being sorry." "U & I" was broadcast on July 11, 2014, and was based on Jonghyun's relationship with his listeners, as he introduced the song saying, "Treat Blue Night like your diary and feel free to let me know your stories."

"End of a Day" was first broadcast on November 10, 2014, during the second season of "The Man Who Composes", and Jonghyun wrote it based on his feelings about coming home from work every day. He was inspired to write the song by his dog, Byulroo. "Happy Birthday" was broadcast on November 12, 2014. It was intended to be a melancholic birthday song, as it was influenced by multiple stories from listeners who celebrated their birthdays alone or the birthdays of loved ones who are no longer in their lives.

"Maybe Tomorrow" was broadcast on April 7, 2015. Jonghyun was influenced by multiple submissions where listeners often discussed taking a day off to rest from work and wrote a song to tell them to cheer up at their own pace. The beginning of the song features a phone recording of a conversation between him and Wefreaky pianist So-jin, his friend from high school. "Diphylleia Grayi" was broadcast on April 10, 2015, the song using the skeleton flower as a metaphor for facing both external and internal struggles. Jonghyun had written the song early on, wanting to contribute to a soundtrack for a Korean historical drama.

"02:34" was broadcast on July 8, 2015, and was based on Jonghyun's experiences drinking with his friends after work, calling it a "friendship" song. "Fine" was broadcast on July 13, 2015, and the background of the song was described as "the decisive moment of action that could take place between a man and a woman left alone", where Jonghyun uses it as a metaphor for describing future possibilities.

== Track listing ==
All lyrics are written by Jonghyun; all music is composed by Jonghyun and Wefreaky except where noted.

Story Op.1 track listing
No.	Title	Music	Arrangement	Length
1.	"End of a Day" (하루의 끝; Haruui kkeut)		Jonghyun; Wefreaky	04:37
2.	"U & I"		Score	02:51
3.	"Like You"		Philtre	03:15
4.	"Diphylleia Grayi" (산하엽; Sanhayeop; 'Skeleton Flower')		E-Nail	04:35
5.	"Happy Birthday"		Score	02:51
6.	"I'm Sorry" (미안해; Mianhae)		E-Nail	04:11
7.	"02:34"	Jonghyun; Wefreaky; Heuktae	Jonghyun; Wefreaky; Heuktae	03:46
8.	"Fine" (그래도 되지 않아?; Geuraedo doeji ana?; 'Wouldn't That Be Fine?')	Jonghyun; Wefreaky; Heuktae	Jonghyun; Wefreaky; Heuktae	03:04
9.	"Maybe Tomorrow" (내일쯤; Naeiljjeum)		Score	03:13
Total length:				32:23

== Charts ==
Chart performance for Story Op.1
Chart (2015)	Peak position
Japanese Albums (Oricon)	15
Japan Hot Albums (Billboard Japan)	54
South Korean Albums (Gaon)	3
US World Albums (Billboard)	7

== Release history ==
Release history and formats for Story Op.1
Region	Date	Format	Label
South Korea	September 17, 2015	CD; digital download; streaming	SM Entertainment; KT Music
Various	September 17, 2015	Digital download; streaming	SM Entertainment
