= Shinee World 2013 =

2013 concert tour by Shinee

- Japan tour by Shinee
- The official logo of the tour
- Location: Japan
- Associated album: Boys Meet U
- Start date: June 28, 2013
- End date: December 25, 2013
- No. of shows: 15

Shinee concert chronology
- Shinee World II (2012); Shinee World 2013 (2013); Shinee World III (2014)

Shinee World 2013 (promoted as JAPAN ARENA TOUR SHINee WORLD 2013 ～Boys Meet U～) is the second Japan nationwide concert tour by South Korean boy group Shinee to promote their second Japanese studio album, Boys Meet U. The tour kicked off in Saitama on June 28, 2013, and ended in Tokyo on December 25, 2013, with a total of 15 concerts in nine cities. The tour gathered over 220,000 fans. The video album for the tour was released on April 2, 2014.

== History ==
Shinee performed their first set of concerts for Shinee World 2013 from June 28 to June 30, 2013. All in all, Shinee performed a total of 29 tracks, including their new promotional single "Breaking News", as well as their previous songs "Juliette", "Replay" and "Lucifer". They also revealed for the first time the Japanese version of "Dream Girl" and their new single "Boys Meet U", which was released on August 21, 2013.

Shinee completed their second Japanese arena tour in Tokyo. The finale performance took place between December 24 and 25, 2013, and gathered over 24,000 attendees in the Yoyogi National Gymnasium. The performance on December 24 was later released on DVD. The concert lasted for about two and a half hours and they performed a total of 30 songs, including tracks from their first and second Japanese albums, as well as their Japanese singles. Shinee also performed the Japanese version of "Everybody" for the first time. The group added:

We're happy to know that there are so many of you who love our music. We were nervous since this is our last concert for the tour, but thank you for cheering enthusiastically throughout the show. We are happy to see your beautiful smiles.

== Set list ==
1. "Stranger" (Japanese version)
2. "Juliette" (Japanese version)
3. "Seesaw"
4. "Replay (Kimi wa Boku no Everything)"
5. "Lucifer" (Japanese version)
6. "I'm With U"
7. "1000nen, Zutto Soba ni Ite..."
8. "Sunny Day Hero"
9. "Beautiful"
10. "Why So Serious?"
11. "Password"
12. "Kiss Yo"
13. "Start"
14. "Dazzling Girl"
15. "Hello" (Japanese version)
16. "Fire"
17. "Moon River Waltz"
18. "The World Where You Exist"
19. "Dream Girl" (Japanese version)
20. "To Your Heart"
21. "Burning Up!"
22. "Amigo" (Japanese version)
23. "Breaking News"
24. "Colors of the Season"
25. "Everybody" (Japanese version)

Encore

26. "The Shinee World" (Japanese version)
27. "Run With Me"
28. "3 2 1"
29. "Sherlock" (Japanese version)
30. "Boys Meet U"

== Tour dates ==
List of concerts, showing date, city, country, venue, and attendance
Date	City	Venue	Attendance
June 28, 2013	Saitama	Saitama Super Arena	220,000
June 29, 2013	Saitama	Saitama Super Arena	220,000
June 30, 2013	Saitama	Saitama Super Arena	220,000
July 6, 2013	Osaka	Osaka-jō Hall	220,000
July 7, 2013	Osaka	Osaka-jō Hall	220,000
July 13, 2013	Niigata	Toki Messe	220,000
August 3, 2013	Sapporo	Makomanai Ice Arena	220,000
August 17, 2013	Kobe	World Memorial Hall	220,000
August 18, 2013	Kobe	World Memorial Hall	220,000
September 11, 2013	Hiroshima	Hiroshima Green Arena	220,000
November 25, 2013	Fukuoka	Marine Messe Fukuoka	220,000
December 10, 2013	Nagoya	Nippon Gaishi Hall	220,000
December 11, 2013	Nagoya	Nippon Gaishi Hall	220,000
December 24, 2013	Tokyo	Yoyogi National Gymnasium	220,000
December 25, 2013	Tokyo	Yoyogi National Gymnasium	220,000
