= Dream Girl =

Dream Girl or dreamgirl may refer to:

== Film, theater, and television ==
=== Film ===
- The Dream Girl (film), a 1916 American silent drama film directed by Cecil B. DeMille
- Dream Girl (1948 film), an American film adapted from the play by Elmer Rice (see below)
- Dream Girl (1977 film), an Indian Hindi-language romantic drama film by Pramod Chakravorty, starring Hema Malini
  - Hema Malini, Indian actress, often referred to as the Dream Girl and the namesake of the film
- Dream Girl (1997 film), a 1997 Pakistani film
- Dream Girl (2009 film), an Indian Oriya-language romantic comedy film by Ashok Pati
- Dream, Girl (2016 film), a documentary featuring Clara Villarosa
- Dream Girl (2019 film), an Indian Hindi-language comedy film by Raj Shandilya, starring Ayushman Khurana
  - Dream Girl 2, 2023 sequel film by Shandilya
- Dream Girl (2026 film), an Indian Tamil-language love romance drama film by M. R. Bharathi
- Dreamgirls (film), a 2006 film adaptation of the Broadway musical (see below)

=== Theater ===
- The Dream Girl (operetta), a 1924 operetta by Victor Herbert, Rida Johnson Young, and Harold R. Atteridge
- Dream Girl (play), a 1945 stage play by Elmer Rice
- Dreamgirls, a 1981 Broadway musical based on Diana Ross and the Supremes

=== Television ===
- Dream Girl (TV series), a 2015–2016 Indian drama series

== Literature ==
- Dreamgirl: My Life as a Supreme, a 1986 autobiography by Mary Wilson
- Dream Girl (comics), Nura Nal, a DC Comics superhero

== Music ==
=== Performers ===
- Dream Girls (band), a 2011–2015 Taiwanese girl group
- Bobbie Smith and the Dream Girls, a 1950s and 1960s American girl group

=== Albums ===
- Dream Girl (album), by Anna of the North, or the title song, 2019
- Dream Girl – The Misconceptions of You, by Shinee, or the title song, 2013
- Dreamgirls: Music from the Motion Picture, 2006
- Dreamgirls: Original Broadway Cast Album, 1982

=== Songs ===
- "Dream Girl" (Butrint Imeri and Nimo song), 2019
- "Dream Girl" (Eric Ethridge song), 2020
- "Dreamgirl" (song), by Dave Matthews Band, 2005
- "Dream Girls" (song), by I.O.I, 2016
- "Dream Girl", by Aaliyah Qureishi, 2022
- "Dream Girl", by Arthur Alexander, 1963
- "Dream Girl", by Basshunter from Now You're Gone – The Album, 2008
- "Dream Girl", by Pierre's Pfantasy Club, 1988
- "Dream Girl", by Davy Jones from David Jones, 1965
- "Dream Girl", by Deli Creeps, 1990
- "Dream Girl", by Idina Menzel and cast from the Cinderella film soundtrack, 2021
- "Dream Girl", by Mark Wynter, competing to represent the United Kingdom in the Eurovision Song Contest 1961
- "Dream Girl", by Mumzy Stranger, 2008
- "Dream Girl", by New Edition from One Love, 2004
- "Dream Girl", by Sean Paul from Tomahawk Technique, 2012
- "Dream Girl", by Stephen Bishop from National Lampoon's Animal House
- "Dreamgirl" by The Lonely Island from Incredibad, 2009

== See also ==
- Manic Pixie Dream Girl, a stock character in film
- It girl (disambiguation)
- Swapna Sundari (disambiguation) (lit. 'Dream Girl'), various Indian films
