= The Misconceptions of Us =

Studio album by Shinee
- Released: August 8, 2013
- Recorded: 2013
- Studios: Doobdoob (Seoul); In Grid (Seoul); Seoul; SM Big Shot (Seoul); SM Blue Cup (Seoul); SM Yellow Tail (Seoul); T (Seoul); Vibe (Seoul); W (Seoul)
- Genre: K-pop
- Length: 72:32
- Languages: Korean; English
- Labels: SM; KT Music

Shinee chronology
Boys Meet U (2013)	The Misconceptions of Us (2013)	Everybody (2013)

Singles from The Misconceptions of Us
- 1. "Dream Girl" Released: February 19, 2013; 2. "Why So Serious?" Released: April 26, 2013

Music video
- "Dream Girl" on YouTube

Music video
- "Why So Serious?" on YouTube

The Misconceptions of Us is the third studio album released by South Korean boy band Shinee. It consists of two parts, Dream Girl – The Misconceptions of You and the second Why So Serious? – The Misconceptions of Me, that were later collected together as The Misconceptions of Us under SM Entertainment and distributed by KT Music.

== Background ==
From a production stand point, we wanted to express "Misconceptions of You" in the first chapter and "Misconceptions of Me" in the second chapter. The two albums have a lot of stories about "misconceptions".

— Shinee, at "Melon Premiere Shinee Music Spoiler", on the splitting of The Misconceptions of Us

On February 7, SM Entertainment announced that Shinee would release their third studio album later that month, with "Dream Girl" as the lead single. Shortly after, the group held the event "Melon Premiere Shinee Music Spoiler" where they revealed songs from the album to 100 music reviewers. The album was confirmed to be split into two "chapters", Dream Girl – The Misconceptions of You and Why So Serious? – The Misconceptions of Me, both within the framework of "misconceptions".

Two of the directors for the album also made an appearance to give a basic explanation about the concepts and meanings behind the project. Director Lee Sung-soo from SM Entertainment's production department shared information about the songs and their meanings, while director Min Hee-jin from the visual and art directing department introduced Shinee's visual concept. Furthermore, the choreography for the lead single "Dream Girl" was revealed, which was choreographed by Tony Testa, who previously worked with Shinee on "Sherlock (Clue + Note)". The making of the music video was also shown which showed the members jumping on trampolines and using running machines. Member Onew stated on the making of the two albums, "It's our first full album that we're releasing in a while, so we worked really hard. Minho and Key worked on the rapping, Jonghyun worked on the lyrics, and Taemin worked on the choreography." Taemin described the album as one where each member's individuality shines through their voices, "We know each other best so a lot of our opinions went into this album." Jonghyun added, "Taemin's delivery of the lyrics is good. Minho's falsetto is really nice these days. Key is good at English. We know each other's strengths so we split the parts up according to who can shine on what. We had fun working on the album."

Dream Girl – The Misconceptions of You can be interpreted as the dreams, ideals, and visions of the world through Shinee's eyes. In contrast, Why So Serious? – The Misconceptions of Me was described as evoking the gap between Shinee's reality and dreams and has an overall deeper and darker sound. Jonghyun stated, "Why So Serious – The Misconceptions of Me will show our worldview. It will have a deep and rough sound. It embodies our group's unique personality and musical sensation". Lee Sung-soo compared the split album format to Shinee's previous release, Sherlock, stating that instead of mixing two songs together, as they had done with "Sherlock (Clue + Note)", they had combined two albums with different concepts into one. Lee also said that there are hidden keywords that connect the songs in the two albums and, "We included a fun point where you can search for keywords and put them together to create several interpretations."

== Composition ==
=== Dream Girl – The Misconceptions of You ===
The album's opening track, "Spoiler", contains the titles of songs included in both albums, connecting the two parts. As the song's title suggests, it provides a spoiler for what is to come. "Dream Girl" was produced by Hyuk Shin and his team of composers, Joombas Music Factory. They described the song as "an acid electro funk song". It is written by Jun Gandi and composed by Hyuk Shin, Jordan Kyle, Ross Lara, Dave Cook, DK, and Anthony "TC" Crawford. The song has a fuller sound, featuring electric guitars among various other synths and the beat is very diverse and complex with a lot of tempo changes. The song is described as the most "Shinee-like song" in the album and tells about how the five boys meet their dream girl that only appears in their dreams, and disappears in reality. "Hitchhiking" is about a journey through time and space in pursuit of love. "Punch Drunk Love" compares falling in love to losing consciousness after being hit by a punch. "Girls Girls Girls" resembles a song from a musical, while "Aside" tells a story of unrequited love. "Beautiful" features a catchy hook, evoking a "bright" and "cheerful" atmosphere. "Dynamite" is about melting the cold heart of a lover with love that is hot like dynamite. "Runaway" expresses excitement about making a new start.

=== Why So Serious? – The Misconceptions of Me ===
"Why So Serious?" is a funk rock dance track that was chosen as the title track and lead single from the album. The song was written and produced by Kenzie and composed by Kim Cheong-bae, Andrew Choi and Kenzie. It is a genre that combines the powerful and catchy melody of pop with electronica sounds. It talks wittily about a zombie that has lived in darkness for a very long time who falls in love with a human girl. "Shine (Medusa I)" is a powerful dance track that "combines high quality lyrics that express the love of fans as a 'shine' together with tough drum sounds to add enjoyment to listeners". Teddy Riley, Andrew Choi and Kim Tae-seong composed the song, with lyrics penned by Misfit and Minho. "Sleepless Night" is a ballad song accompanied by bittersweet tunes of piano. The song was produced by a Canadian songwriter, Matthew Tishler, in his debut collaboration with Shinee, and Im Kwang-ok. Shim Changmin of TVXQ penned the lyrics, while Shinee's resident rapper Minho yet again contributed to the rap portion.

=== The Misconceptions of Us ===
"Selene 6.23" is a collaboration with the classical pianist Yiruma. It is a medium tempo pop ballad integrated with elements of modern orchestra. The instrumental of the piece was composed by Yiruma. "Selene 6.23" is the first collaboration between Yiruma and Shinee. The music producers are Ted Kim and 2Face. The lyrics were penned by Jonghyun.

== Release and promotion ==
Dream Girl – The Misconceptions of You was released digitally on February 19, 2013, alongside lead single "Dream Girl". The physical edition was released a day later. The music video premiered on February 19 and features the group doing unique tricks with mic stands that are noted to be the highlight of the dance routine, choreographed by Tony Testa. The music video is the work of Digipedi, a South Korean video production company formed and led by the duo Seong Won-mo and Park Sang-woo. A Japanese version of "Dream Girl", written by Hidenori Tanaka and agehasprings, was later included as one of the three tracks on Shinee's eighth Japanese single "Boys Meet U", which was released on August 21, 2013, under the distributing label of EMI Music Japan. Before its release, the song was performed live during their second Japan arena tour Shinee World 2013.

Why So Serious? – The Misconceptions of Me was released digitally on April 26, 2013, and physically on April 29, 2013. "Why So Serious?" served as the lead single and was released simultaneously with the music video on April 26. The music video was filmed in Cheongdam-dong and Namyangju in early April, featuring choreography by Devin Jamieson, who previously worked with the group's labelmates Super Junior. Both the dance and the story present in the music video are reminiscent of the lyrics to the song; as "Why So Serious?" begins describing a zombie's awakening, Shinee lies down on the floor and reaches toward the sky. Jonghyun was unable to participate in the music video and the early stages of album promotions due to injuries sustained during a car accident. SM Entertainment said in a statement, "Jonghyun was discharged from the hospital [...], and until he is fully healed, he’ll be focusing on treatments." He resumed activities on May 23, joining the group for their performance on M Countdown.

The two parts of the album were collected together as The Misconceptions of Us on August 8, 2013. It included two new songs, "Selene 6.23" and "Better Off". The album cover art was designed by Key.

== Critical and commercial performance ==
Billboard K-Town columnist Jeff Benjamin wrote that the lead single, "Dream Girl", is a "safe, enjoyable mainstream single" while the album is "a triumph that never lacks in energy and balances nods to 80s pop stars and forward-thinking pop". He said "songs like 'Punch Drunk Love' and 'Aside' sonically recall the sounds of Michael Jackson and Lionel Richie, respectively", while "tracks like 'Beautiful' and 'Runaway' combine unique electronic production elements over sugary boy band harmonies to create year-round pop music".

Dream Girl – The Misconceptions of You was commercially successful in South Korea—the title track topped the Gaon Digital Chart, while the album charted at number one on the Gaon Album Chart. The album sold over 137,000 copies during the first month of release and more than 180,000 by the end of the year. It was the ninth best-selling album of 2013.

Why So Serious? – The Misconceptions of Me sold over 130,000 copies in 2013, and as of 2016, the whole Misconceptions series has sold around 360,000 copies in South Korea. In 2024, EBS named The Misconceptions of Us one of the 100 best Korean popular music albums since 2004.

== Track listing ==
Dream Girl – The Misconceptions of You track listing
No.	Title	Lyrics	Music	Arrangement	Length
1.	"Spoiler"	Jonghyun	Thomas Troelsen; Rufio Sandilands (Pegasus); Rocky Morris (Pegasus)	Troelsen; Pegasus	3:31
2.	"Dream Girl"	Jeon Gan-di; Minho^{[a]}	Hyuk Shin (Joombas); DK (Joombas); Jordan Kyle; Ross Lara (Joombas); Dave Cook (Joombas)	Joombas; Kyle	3:00
3.	"Hitchhiking" (히치하이킹)	Kim Boo-min	Hitchhiker; Will Simms; Anne Judith Wik	Hitchhiker	4:07
4.	"Punch Drunk Love"	Jeon	Troelsen; Herbert St. Clair Crichlow	Troelsen; Crichlow	3:39
5.	"Girls, Girls, Girls"	Jeon; Minho^{[a]}; Key^{[b]}	Troelsen; Lucas Secon; Mikkel Remee Sigvardt	Troelsen; Secon; Sigvardt	2:46
6.	"Aside" (방백; Bangbaek)	Hwang Hyun (MonoTree); Minho^{[a]}	Hyun	MonoTree	3:44
7.	"Beautiful" (아름다워; Areumdawo)	Tesung Kim (Iconic Sounds); Minho^{[a]}	Teddy Riley (Red Rocket); Dominique "DOM" Rodriguez (Audity & Red Rocket); Andrew Choi; Richard Garcia (Audity); Tesung Kim	Andrew Choi; Audity; Red Rocket	3:10
8.	"Dynamite" (다이너마이트)	Kim Boo-min; Minho^{[a]}	Hitchhiker	Hitchhiker	3:39
9.	"Runaway"	Young-hu Kim	Young-hu Kim (Ghostkick); Dennis White; Jovan Rangel (Ghostkick)	Static Revenger; Ghostkick	3:10
10.	"Selene 6.23" (너와 나의 거리; Neowa naui geori; 'The Distance Between You and Me')	Jonghyun	Yiruma; 2Face; Tesung Kim	Yiruma; 2Face; Tesung Kim	4:10
Total length:					35:10

Why So Serious? – The Misconceptions of Me track listing
No.	Title	Lyrics	Music	Arrangement	Length
1.	"Nightmare"	Kim Boo-min	Hitchhiker	Hitchhiker	3:37
2.	"Why So Serious?"	Kenzie	Kenzie; Kim Jeong-bae; Andrew Choi	Kenzie	3:40
3.	"Shine" (Medusa I)	Misfit; Minho^{[a]}	Teddy Riley (Red Rocket); Dominique "DOM" Rodriguez (Red Rocket); Andrew Choi; Tesung Kim (Iconic Sounds)	Red Rocket; Tesung Kim	3:49
4.	"Orgel" (오르골; lit. 'Music Box')	Jonghyun; Minho^{[a]}; Key^{[b]}	Iain James; Mikko Paavola; Christopher Lee-Joe (BNA Productions); Philipe-Marc Anquetil (BNA Productions)	James; Paavola; BNA Productions	3:26
5.	"Dangerous" (Medusa II)	Jo Yoon-kyung; Jonghyun	Riley; Rodriguez; Tesung Kim; Choi	Red Rocket; Tesung Kim; Choi	3:32
6.	"Like a Fire"	Min Yeon-jae (lalala Studio)	Thomas Troelsen; Herbert St. Clair Crichlow	Troelsen; Crichlow	3:42
7.	"Excuse Me Miss"	Kim Boo-min; Minho^{[a]}; JQ (Makeumine Works)^{[c]}	Amanshia Nunoo; Dwayne Fyne; Ryan S. Jhun	Nunoo; Fyne; Jhun	3:42
8.	"Evil"	Kenzie; Fridolin Nordsø; Frederik Nordsø	Kenzie; Fridolin Nordsø; Frederik Nordsø	Kenzie; Fridolin Nordsø; Frederik Nordsø	3:27
9.	"Sleepless Night" (떠나지 못해; Tteonaji mothae)	Max Changmin; Minho^{[a]}	Im Kwang-wook (Devine Channel); Kim Yu-min; Matthew Tishler	Im; Kim Yu-min; Tishler	4:41
10.	"Better Off" (버리고 가; Beorigo ga)	Jonghyun; Minho^{[a]}	Bardur Haberg; Jenson David Aubrey Vaughan	Hong-seok	4:00
Total length:					37:36

Notes

- ^{^[a]} Minho is credited for the rap lyrics
- ^{^[b]} Key is credited for the rap lyrics
- ^{^[c]} JQ is credited for the rap lyrics

== Charts ==
=== Weekly charts ===
Weekly chart performance
Chart (2013)	Peak position		
Chart (2013)	DG – TMOY	WSS? – TMOM	TMOU
Japanese Albums (Oricon)	10	8	17
South Korean Albums (Gaon)	1	1	4
Taiwanese Albums (G-Music)	1	1	—
US Heatseekers Albums (Billboard)	5	5	—
US World Albums (Billboard)	2	1	—

=== Monthly charts ===
Monthly chart performance
Chart (2013)	Peak position		
Chart (2013)	DG – TMOY	WSS? – TMOM	TMOU
South Korean Albums (Gaon)	1	1	7

=== Year-end charts ===
Year-end chart performance
Chart (2013)	Peak position		
Chart (2013)	DG – TMOY	WSS? – TMOM	TMOU
South Korean Albums (Gaon)	9	15	42

== Accolades ==
Awards and nominations for The Misconceptions of Us
Ceremony	Year	Category	Work	Result	Ref.
Golden Disc Awards	2014	Album Bonsang	Dream Girl – The Misconceptions of You	Won	
Golden Disc Awards	2014	Album Daesang	Dream Girl – The Misconceptions of You	Nominated	
Korean Music Awards	2014	Best Dance & Electronic Album	The Misconceptions of Us	Nominated	
Melon Music Awards	2013	Album of the Year	Dream Girl – The Misconceptions of You	Nominated	
Mnet Asian Music Awards	2013	Album of the Year	Dream Girl – The Misconceptions of You	Nominated	
Red Dot Design Award	2014	Communication Design	Dream Girl – The Misconceptions of You	Won	
Red Dot Design Award	2014	Communication Design	Why So Serious? – The Misconceptions of Me	Won	
Red Dot Design Award	2014	Communication Design	The Misconceptions of Us	Won	
World Music Awards	2013	World's Best Album	Dream Girl – The Misconceptions of You	Nominated	

Music program awards
Song	Program	Date	Ref.
"Dream Girl"
"Dream Girl"	Show Champion (MBC Music)	February 27, 2013	
"Dream Girl"	Show Champion (MBC Music)	March 6, 2013	
"Dream Girl"	Show Champion (MBC Music)	March 13, 2013	
"Dream Girl"	Show Champion (MBC Music)	March 20, 2013	
"Dream Girl"	M Countdown (Mnet)	February 28, 2013	
"Dream Girl"	M Countdown (Mnet)	March 7, 2013	
"Dream Girl"	M Countdown (Mnet)	March 14, 2013	
"Dream Girl"	Music Bank (KBS)	March 8, 2013	
"Dream Girl"	Music Bank (KBS)	March 15, 2013	
"Dream Girl"	Inkigayo (SBS)	March 17, 2013	

== Release history ==
Release history and formats for The Misconceptions of Us
Region	Date	Format	Edition	Label	Ref.
Various	February 19, 2013	Digital download; streaming	Dream Girl – The Misconceptions of You	SM	
South Korea	February 20, 2013	CD	Dream Girl – The Misconceptions of You	SM; Iriver	
Various	April 26, 2013	Digital download; streaming	Why So Serious? – The Misconceptions of Me	SM	
South Korea	April 29, 2013	CD	Why So Serious? – The Misconceptions of Me	SM; Iriver	
South Korea	August 8, 2013	CD	The Misconceptions of Us	SM; Iriver	
Various	August 8, 2013	Digital download; streaming	The Misconceptions of Us	SM	
