= Shinee =

South Korean boy band

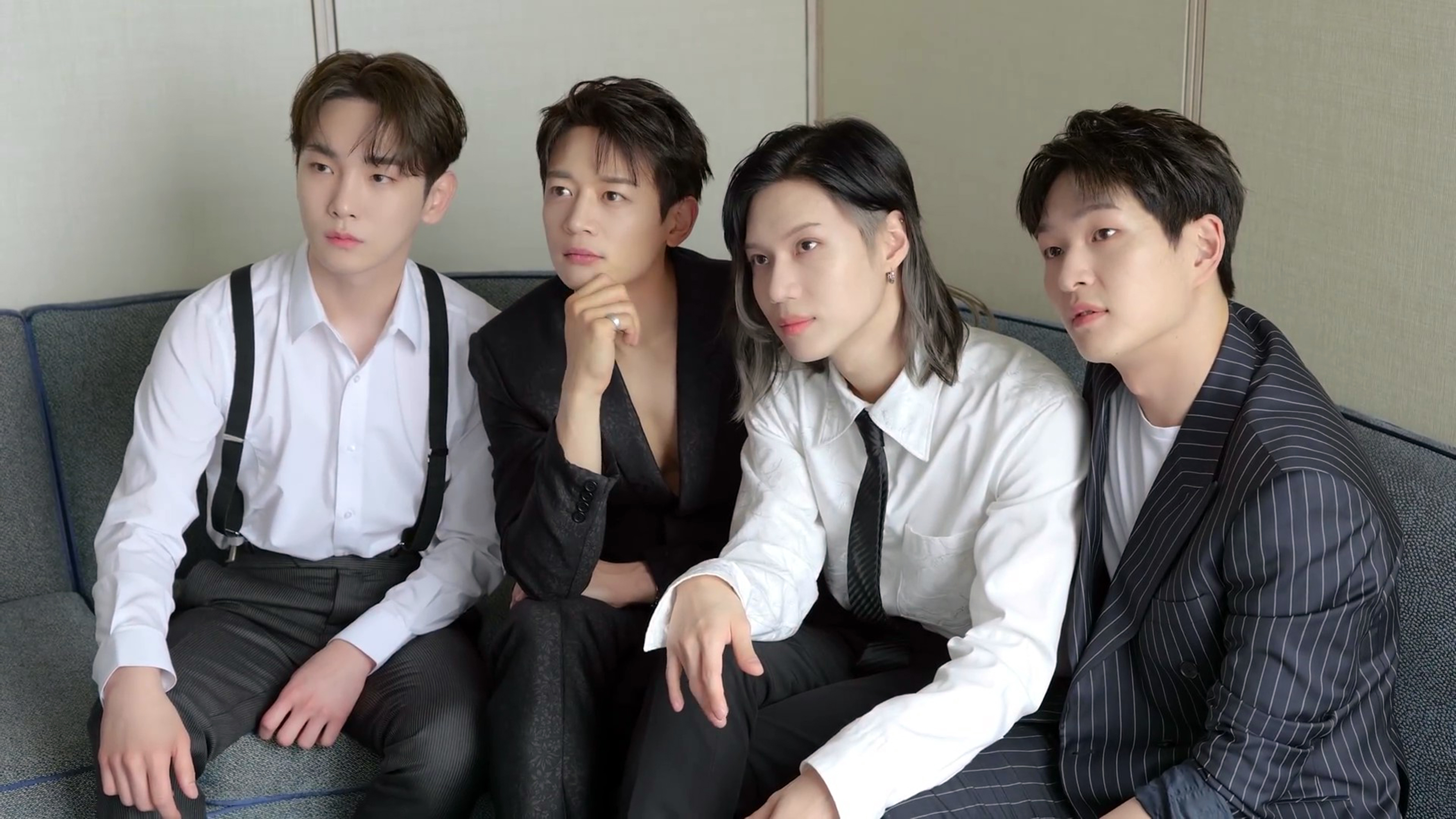
- Shinee for Marie Claire Korea, July 2021; L-R: Key, Minho, Taemin, Onew

Background information
- Origin: Seoul, South Korea
- Genres: K-pop; J-pop; R&B; EDM; hip hop
- Years active: 2008–present
- Labels: SM; EMI; Universal
- Member of: SM Town
- Spinoffs: SuperM
- Members: Onew; Key; Minho; Taemin
- Past members: Jonghyun
- Website: shinee.jp

Shinee (/ˈʃaɪniː/ SHY-nee; Korean: 샤이니, romanized: Syaini; Japanese: シャイニー, romanized: Shainī; stylized as SHINee) is a South Korean boy band formed by SM Entertainment in 2008. The group consists of four members: Onew, Key, Minho, and Taemin. Shinee was originally a five-member band; Jonghyun died on December 18, 2017. Their musical impact in their native country has earned them numerous accolades and the title "Princes of K-pop", and their music has been listed among the greatest boy band songs of all time.

Shinee debuted in May 2008 with their first extended play (EP), Replay, fronted by the single of the same name. They gained attention for starting a fashion trend amongst students, which the media dubbed the "Shinee Trend". In August 2008, they released their first Korean studio album, The Shinee World, which won Newcomer Album of the Year at the 23rd Golden Disc Awards. Shinee further consolidated their popularity on the South Korean music scene with follow-up singles "Ring Ding Dong" and "Lucifer". "Ring Ding Dong" charted on top of several Korean music charts and gained popularity all over Asia. "Lucifer" was nominated for the Best Dance Performance Award at the Mnet Asian Music Awards in 2010 for its outstanding choreography. In 2012, they released Sherlock, which became the fifth best-selling album of the year with over 180,000 copies sold. Subsequent albums included The Misconceptions of Us (2013), Odd (2015), 1 of 1 (2016), The Story of Light (2018), Don't Call Me (2021), and Hard (2023). Shinee has also been included in the Forbes Korea Power Celebrity 40 twice (2014, 2016).

In mid-2011, Shinee signed with EMI Music Japan to venture into the Japanese music scene. Their Japanese version of their single "Replay" sold over 100,000 copies, the highest number of sales for a Japanese debut single recorded by Oricon for a South Korean group at the time. It was followed by their first Japanese studio album, The First, on December 7, 2011 – both were certified Gold by RIAJ for selling over 100,000 copies. In 2011, they also held their Japan Debut Premium Reception at Abbey Road Studios in London, making them the first Asian artists to perform there. Two years later, they released their second Japanese album Boys Meet U (2013), followed by I'm Your Boy (2014), D×D×D (2016), and Five (2017).

Shinee is considered to be one of the best live vocal groups in K-pop and is known for their highly synchronized and complex dance routines, having been awarded the Best Dance Performance Award at the Mnet Asian Music Awards three times in total for their dance performances to "Sherlock (Clue + Note)", "Dream Girl" and "View". Shinee's signature musical style is contemporary R&B, but they are known for their experimental sound, incorporating various genres including funk rock, hip hop, and EDM.

== History ==
=== 2008: Debut and The Shinee World ===
Prior to the group's debut, the label company, SM Entertainment, introduced an upcoming contemporary R&B boy group with its goal to be trendsetters in all areas of music, fashion and dance. The group's Korean name, Shinee, is a new coined word and is explained as a combination of shine, meaning light, and the suffix ee, therefore meaning "one who receives the light". On May 22, 2008, the group's first EP, Replay, was released, which debuted at number ten on the South Korean music charts and peaked at number eight, selling 17,957 copies in the first half of 2008. On May 25, 2008, Shinee had their first stage performance on SBS' Inkigayo with their single "Replay".

In June 2008, the group won their first award, Rookie of the Month, at the Cyworld Digital Music Awards, and were also awarded with the Hot New Star award at the Mnet 20's Choice Awards in August 2008. In the same month, Shinee subsequently released their first full-length album, The Shinee World, which debuted at number three, selling 30,000 copies. Its lead single "Love Like Oxygen" is a cover of "Show the World" by Martin Hoberg Hedegaard, originally written by the Danish songwriting and production team of Thomas Troelsen, Remee, and Lucas Secon. On September 18, 2008, the song won first place on M Countdown, making it the group's first win on a South Korean music show since debut.

Shinee participated in the 5th Asia Song Festival, where they received the Best New Artist award along with Japanese girl group Berryz Kobo. The group attended the Style Icon Awards on October 30, 2008, where they received the Best Style Icon Award. On the same day, a repackaged version of The Shinee World, titled Amigo, was released, which includes three new songs: "Forever or Never", a remix of "Love Should Go On", and the title track "Amigo". "Amigo" is a shortened version of the Korean phrase "areumdaun minyeoreul joahamyeon gosaenghanda", which can be translated to "The heart aches when you fall in love with a beauty".

In November 2008, Shinee won the Best New Male Group award at the 2008 Mnet KM Music Festival, beating fellow newcomers U-KISS, 2PM, 2AM and Mighty Mouth. In addition, the group also won the award for Newcomer Album of the Year at the 23rd Golden Disc Awards.

=== 2009–2010: Rising popularity and Lucifer ===
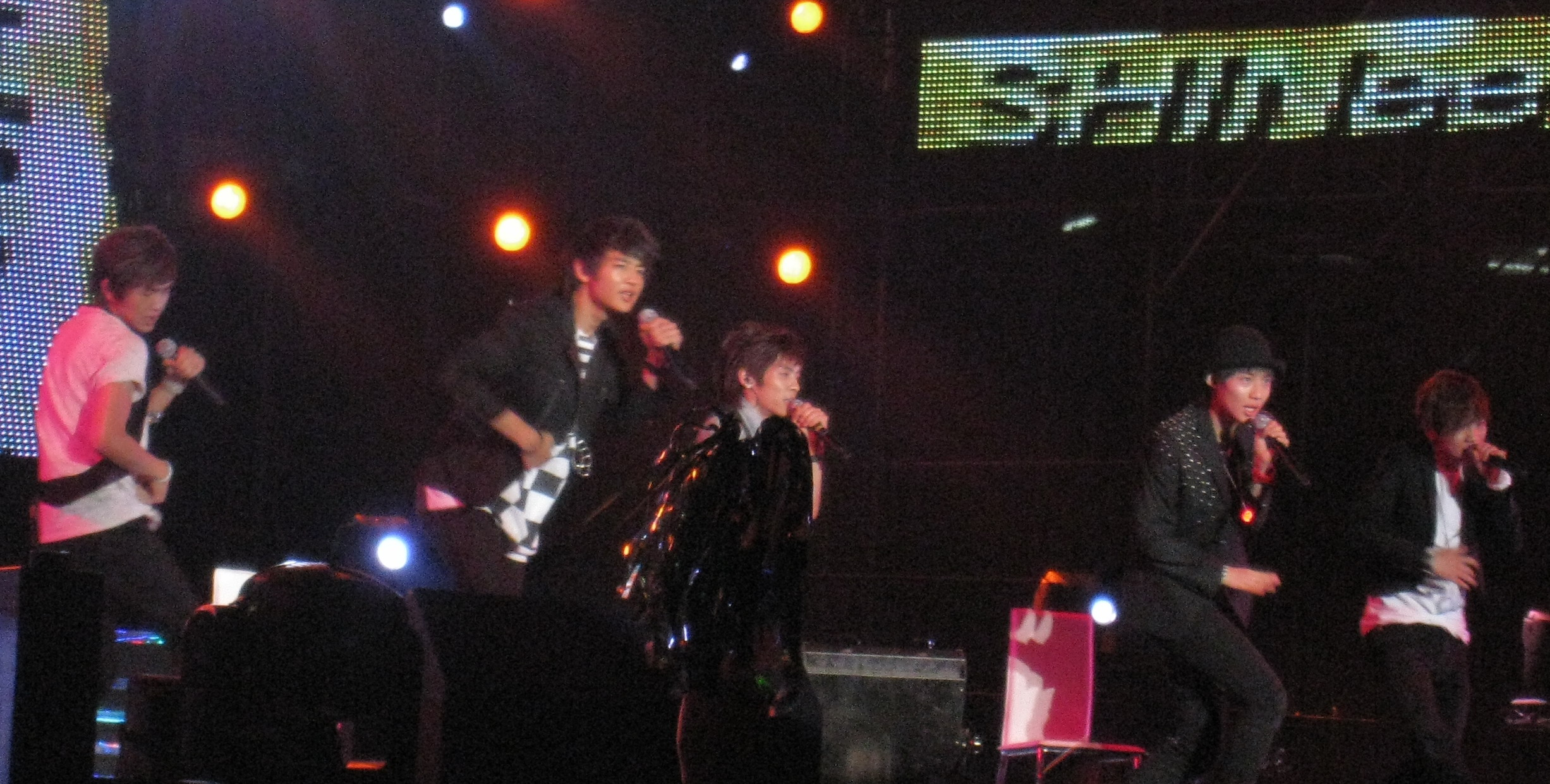
Shinee in February 2009 performing at Rajamangala Stadium in Bangkok.

In early February 2009, Shinee won the Best Newcomer award along with Davichi and Mighty Mouth at the 18th Seoul Music Awards. Shinee's second extended play, Romeo, was released on May 25. Its lead single, "Juliette", was released earlier on May 18. The song is an instrumental remake of Corbin Bleu's "Deal with It". Shinee had their first stage performance for the song on KBS' Music Bank in June 2009, where the group also received the award for the first place.

Shinee released the digital version of their third extended play, 2009, Year of Us, on October 19, 2009, with a physical release on October 22. The lead single, "Ring Ding Dong", was released digitally on October 14 and charted atop of several Korean music charts and gained popularity all over Asia. In early December 2009, the group won the Popularity Award along with Super Junior at the 24th Golden Disc Awards.

On July 19, 2010, the group released their second full-length studio album, Lucifer, which topped various physical and digital sales charts in South Korea. The songs on the album "were more carefully selected than ever", and the album is said to "[give] listeners a great chance to experience the diverse musical characters and more mature vocal skills of the members." The group made their comeback on July 23, 2010, at KBS' Music Bank. For its outstanding choreography, "Lucifer" was nominated for the Best Dance Performance Award at the Mnet Asian Music Awards. Lucifer became the sixth best-selling album of 2010 in South Korea, selling over 120,000 copies. In October 2010, the album was re-released under the title Hello. Amidst their promotional activities for the second studio album, the group also participated in the SM Town Live '10 World Tour on August 21, 2010. On December 26, 2010, Shinee commenced their first concert tour, Shinee World, at Yoyogi National Gymnasium in Tokyo. The event was attended by approximately 24,000 people.

=== 2011–2012: Japanese debut, The First and Sherlock ===
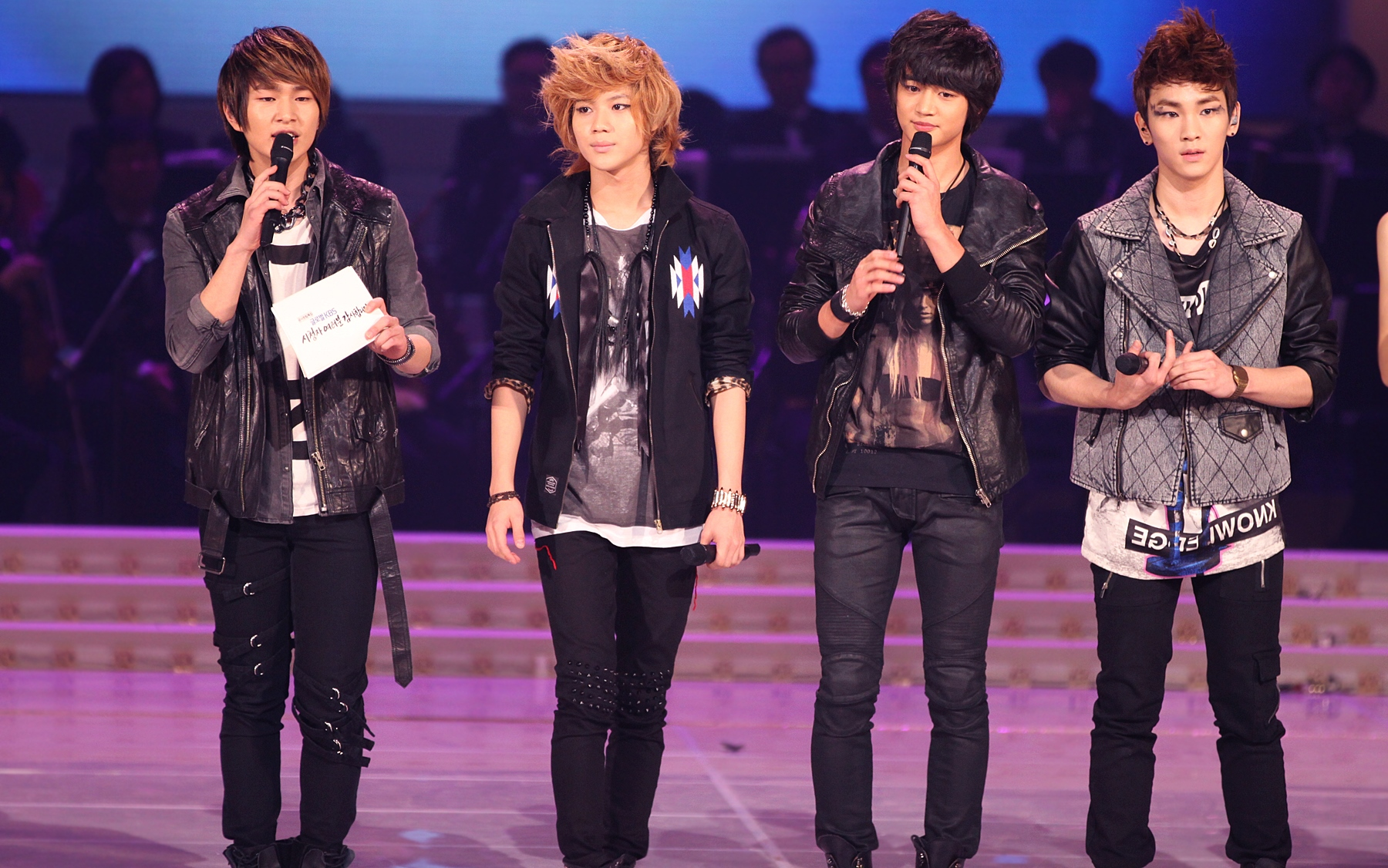
Onew, Taemin, Minho and Key at the KBS Music Festival in 2011.

On January 1, 2011, Shinee performed at Olympic Gymnastics Arena in Seoul as a part of their tour, Shinee World, followed by various cities in Japan throughout 2011. On January 25 and 26, 2011, the group participated in the Japan leg of the SM Town Live '10 World Tour in Tokyo, which continued on to two concerts in Paris at Zénith Paris, three concerts in Tokyo at Tokyo Dome, and at Madison Square Garden in New York City. On June 22, 2011, the group made their debut in Japan with the Japanese version of "Replay", which sold more than 91,000 copies in the first week. It was subsequently certified Gold by RIAJ for selling over 100,000 copies. It was the highest sales recorded by Oricon for a South Korean group debut at the time.

On June 19, Shinee became the first Asian artists to perform at Abbey Road Studios in London, holding their Japan Debut Premium Reception there. On July 22, 2011, Shinee started their Japan Debut Premium Reception Tour and held several concerts in various cities across Japan. On August 28 and October 12, 2011, two Japanese remakes, "Juliette" and "Lucifer", were released, respectively. On August 9, 2011, Shinee took part in an effort to help African children. The groups were joined by the United Nations' Secretary-General, Ban Ki-moon, in the "Help African Children" project co-organized by the Korean Red Cross Society and the Korean UNICEF committee. In November 2011, Shinee were invited to be the opening act of the 6th London Korean Film Festival, which took place at the Odeon West End Theater. The group held an hour-long gala concert to open the festival with tickets selling out within minutes. This marked the first time that any Korean artist(s) had held an independent concert in London.

The group's first Japanese studio album, The First, was released in December 2011. It featured five new songs in addition to Japanese remakes of seven previously released Korean songs. The regular version of the album also featured the theme song of the drama Strangers 6, entitled "Stranger", as a bonus. The album was certified Gold by RIAJ for selling over 100,000 copies. On December 8, Taemin, Onew, and Key debuted as writers and released a travelogue, Children of the Sun, containing stories from their trip to Barcelona, Spain. The members shot the photos and wrote the commentaries themselves. Shinee also participated in the album 2011 Winter SM Town – The Warmest Gift with a cover of the song "Last Christmas". The compilation album by SM artists was released on December 13, 2011.

Shinee held a commemorative concert in honor of the successful release of their first Japanese album, The First, at the Tokyo International Forum Hall A on December 24, 2011. The live concert took place three times in order to accommodate the 15,000 fans that won a lottery to attend. They performed a total of six songs including their Japanese debut singles, "Replay (Kimi wa Boku no Everything)" and "Lucifer", and "To Your Heart". On December 28, 2011, Tower Records Japan announced that Shinee had won the Artist of the Year award at the 2011 K-Pop Lovers! Awards. Shinee's fourth Korean extended play, Sherlock, was released digitally on March 19 and physically on March 21. Sherlock became the fifth best-selling album of the year in South Korea with over 180,000 copies sold. On March 26, 2012, Shinee, alongside their labelmates, became stockholders of SM Entertainment. They received 340 shares each (value of around $13,600 for each member).

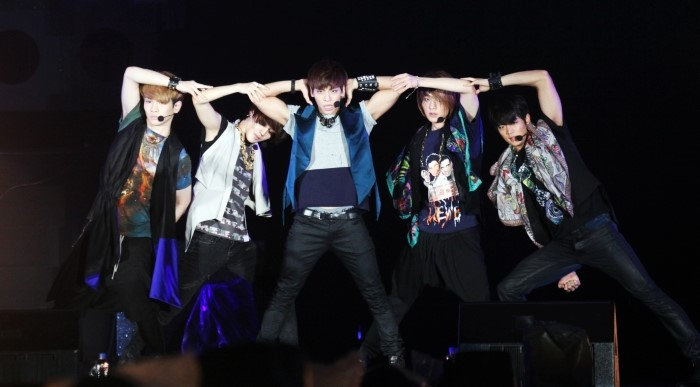
Shinee performs "Sherlock" at the Special Stage Expo 2012.

The Japanese remake of "Sherlock" was released in Japan on May 16. The group started their first Japan nationwide concert tour, Shinee World 2012, on April 25, 2012. The tour had a total of 20 concerts in Fukuoka, Sapporo, Nagoya, Osaka, Kobe, Tokyo and Hiroshima. Their tour set a record for the most people in attendance for a Korean act's first Japan tour with a total of 200,000 people. On May 20, 2012, Shinee participated in the SM Town Live World Tour III alongside their label-mates at Honda Center in Anaheim, California. Shinee held their second solo concert, Shinee World II, beginning in Seoul on July 21 and 22 at Olympic Gymnastics Arena.

Shinee released an original Japanese single, "Dazzling Girl", on October 10, 2012. The single sold 97,111 copies in its first week and was chosen to be the theme song for the Japanese TV series Sukkiri. On November 19, 2012, along with actor Kim Soo-hyun, Shinee won the Ministry of Culture Award at South Korea's Ministry of Culture, Sports and Tourism and Korea Creative Content Agency's (KOCCA) annual award show, the Korean Popular Culture and Arts Awards, at Seoul Olympic Hall. Shinee attended the 2012 Mnet Asian Music Awards in November 2012, which was held in Hong Kong, winning Best Dance Performance – Male Group for their latest Korean single, "Sherlock (Clue + Note)". Shinee released their first Japanese ballad single (sixth overall), "1000-nen, Zutto Soba ni Ite...", and the concert video album for their Shinee World 2012 arena tour on December 12, 2012.

=== 2013–2014: Dream Girl, Why So Serious?, Boys Meet U, Everybody and I'm Your Boy ===
On January 15, 2013, Shinee attended the 27th Golden Disc Awards, which was held in Kuala Lumpur at Sepang International Circuit, and received the Popularity Award for the third time after winning the same title in 2009 and 2010. They also received the Disk Bonsang for Sherlock, their second after winning for Lucifer in 2010. On February 3, MBC announced that Shinee would be starring in their own Lunar New Year special entitled Shinee's Wonderful Day (also known as Shinee's One Fine Day), which began airing on February 10. The special featured the Shinee members visiting various countries of their choice without the assistance of their management staff and with the production crew instructed to not interfere. For the special, Onew visited Thailand, Jonghyun visited Japan, Key and Minho visited England, and Taemin visited Switzerland.

Shinee's third Korean album consisted of two versions: the first part, Dream Girl – The Misconceptions of You, being released on February 19 and the second part, Why So Serious? – The Misconceptions of Me, being released on April 29. The lead single of part one, "Dream Girl", is an acid electro funk track and was produced by Shin Hyuk and Joombas Music Factory, while the lead single of part two, "Why So Serious?", is a funk rock dance track written and produced by Kenzie. A compilation album was subsequently released, The Misconceptions of Us, with two new songs: "Selene 6.23" and "Better Off". On March 13, Shinee released the Japanese single "Fire". On June 26, the group released their second Japanese album, Boys Meet U, and on August 21, a single with the same name was released, including the Japanese version of "Dream Girl". On June 28, 2013, Shinee started their second Japan nationwide concert tour, Shinee World 2013, in Saitama.

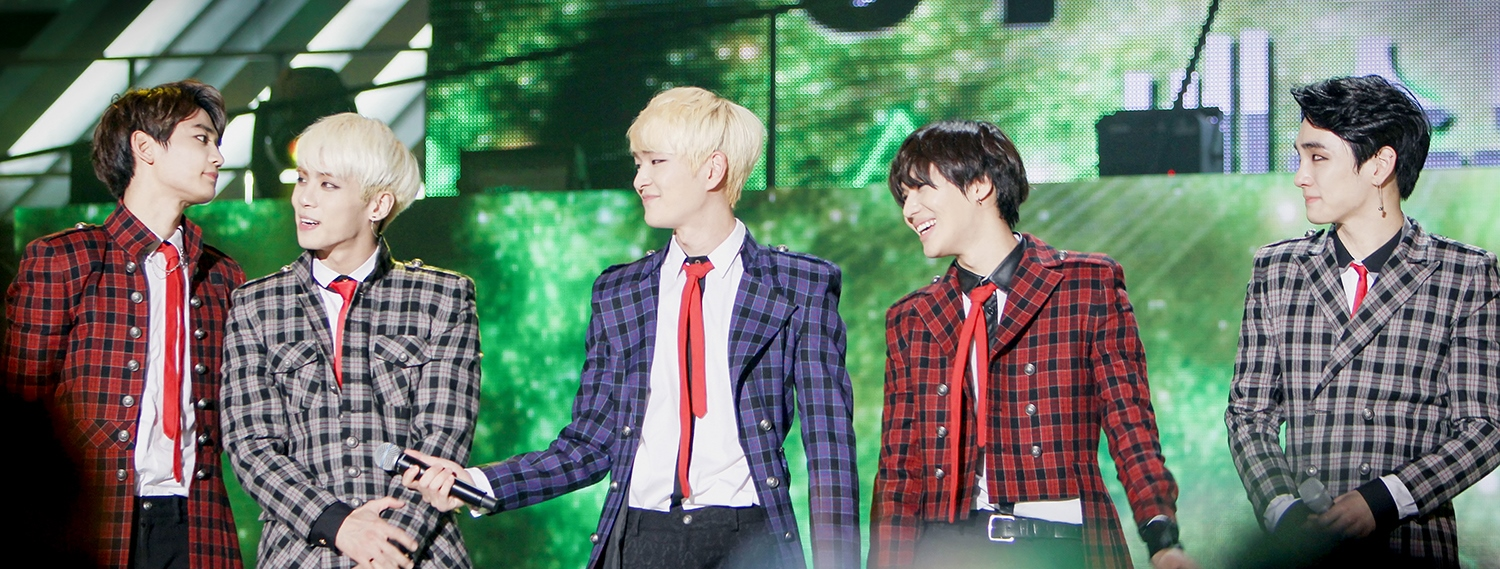
Shinee at the 2013 Melon Music Awards.

On September 29, SM Entertainment announced that Shinee's fifth EP, Everybody, would be released on October 14. In November 2013, Shinee won Artist of the Year at the Melon Music Awards, one of the biggest award ceremonies in the country, which awards prizes based on digital sales and online votes. It was the first time the group won the prize. SM Entertainment announced its week-long music festival called SM Town Week. Shinee's concert, titled The Wizard, opened the event on December 21 at the Kintex in Ilsan.

On January 29, 2014, it was announced that Shinee would hold their third Korean solo concert, Shinee World III, in March, with shows added in Latin America. On February 24, the mayor of Gangnam District, Shin Yeon-hee, announced that Shinee had been appointed honorary ambassadors of the district. On April 2, Shinee released a live concert album from their second solo concert. On June 25, Universal Music Japan released Shinee's tenth Japanese single, "Lucky Star", as their first release under EMI Records. On September 24, Universal Music Japan released the group's third Japanese album, I'm Your Boy, preceded by the singles "Boys Meet U", "3 2 1", and "Lucky Star". From September till December 2014 Shinee embarked on their third Japan tour. It started off at Chiba on September 28, with 30 scheduled performances around the country.

On December 11, 2014, the group released their third live concert album, from Shinee World III, held in Olympic Gymnastics Arena on March 8 and 9 the same year. It contained two CDs with a total of 33 tracks. SM Entertainment stated on December 15 that Shinee sold out the World Memorial Hall in Kobe, Japan, with 16,000 fans attending between December 13 and 14. With that, Shinee successfully completed their 20-city, 30-concert tour, gathering 200,000 audience members overall. Furthermore, Shinee held a solo concert in Tokyo Dome, the first time since their Japanese debut, on March 14 and 15, 2015. The Tokyo Dome concert was the finale and encore for their Japanese tour. Forbes listed Shinee among Korea Power Celebrity in 2014.

=== 2015–2016: Odd, DxDxD and 1 of 1 ===
On February 17, Shinee were invited as the only Korean artist(s) to China's Lunar New Year Program, Chun Jie Wan Hui, which is hosted by Liaoning TV and has been the highest viewed show in its timeslot for 12 years. The same month, the group became ambassadors of the Ministry of Personnel Management to promote Korean music, dance and fashion. Their tasks as ambassadors included performing at events around the world to encourage cultural exchanges between the nations.

Shinee held a three-day long concert, Shinee World IV, at Seoul's Olympic Park Gymnastics Gymnasium between May 15 and 17, where the group premiered the new songs off their upcoming album. Their fourth studio album, Odd, was released on May 18, and the following day the music video to the lead single, "View", was released. The track was written and produced by LDN Noise and Jonghyun. The music video for "View" was the most watched K-pop music video in the world for the month of May. Odd debuted at number nine on Billboard's Heatseekers Albums chart as well as number one on Billboard's World Albums chart and sold over 2,000 copies in the US. The repackaged album, Married to the Music, was released on August 3, 2015, with four additional songs.

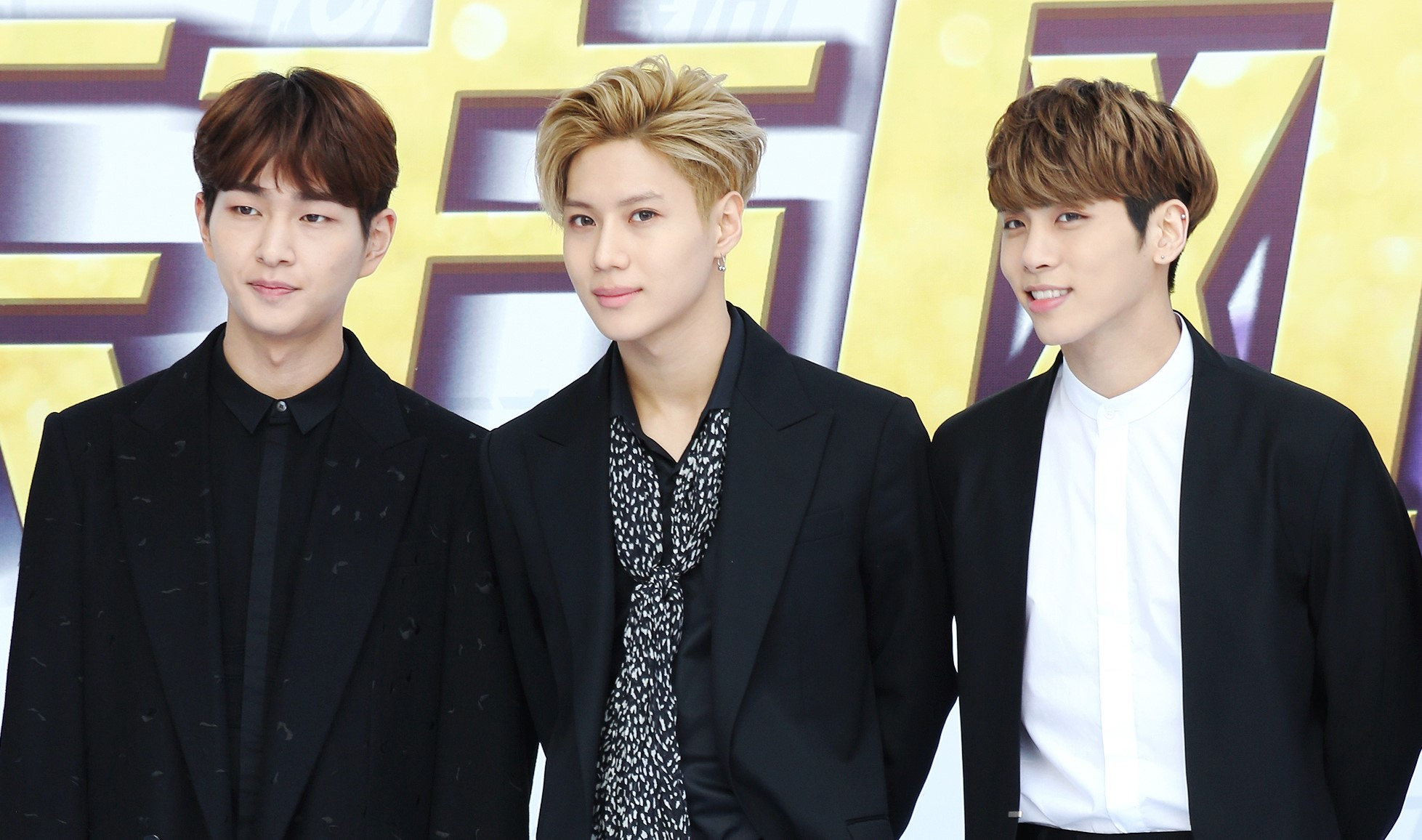
Onew, Taemin and Jonghyun at the 23rd DongFang Music Awards in Shanghai.

They released their eleventh and twelfth Japanese singles, "Sing Your Song" and "D×D×D", on October 25, 2015, and December 13, 2015, respectively, the latter being the lead single for their fourth Japanese album of the same name. On January 1, 2016, Shinee released their fourth full-length Japanese album, D×D×D, which included the group's previously released singles and the Japanese version of "View". The album topped the Oricon charts. To promote the album, they launched their fourth nationwide Japanese stadium tour, Shinee World 2016, starting in Fukuoka's Marine Messe on January 30, 2016, and ending at the Tokyo Dome on May 19, 2016, with a total of 20 concerts in nine cities. Their agency estimated that the concert could have gathered up to 350,000 people, which would bring the cumulative total of visitors to all of Shinee's Japanese tours to 1.12 million. The tour marked their second time headlining Tokyo Dome, which they did on May 18 and 19, and first time headlining Kyocera Dome, on May 14 and 15. They released their 13th Japanese single, "Kimi no Sei de", on May 18, which sold over 69,000 copies in Japan.

In February 2016, Forbes released their top forty of Forbes' Korea Power Celebrity, Shinee being included once again. In March, Shinee won the Asia's Best Group Award at the 23rd DongFang Music Awards in Shanghai, one of the biggest annual award ceremonies in China. The group was the only K-pop act invited to attend and perform at the ceremony.

On September 4, 2016, Shinee held their fifth solo concert, titled Shinee World V, in Seoul. Four of the 34 songs performed were songs from the group's new album, which was released on October 5, 2016, under the title 1 of 1. The album "spins a hyper-modernized twist on the retro genre", inspired by the 1980–1990 period. The repackaged version, titled 1 and 1, was released on November 15, 2016, with five new songs. On December 21, 2016, Shinee released their fourteenth Japanese single, "Winter Wonderland", which debuted at number two on the Oricon Charts and sold over 80,000 copies in one week. Shinee also had the sixth biggest audience numbers for their concerts in Japan in 2016, with an estimated 510,000 people across 28 concerts.

=== 2017–2019: Five, Jonghyun's death, The Story of Light, and military service ===
On February 22, Shinee released their fifth full-length Japanese album, Five. To promote the album, they launched their fifth Japan tour, Shinee World 2017, starting on January 28, 2017, and ending in Tokyo on April 30, 2017, with a total of 25 concerts in 10 cities. Later on, the group added four additional performances for the tour at Tokyo Dome and Kyocera Dome starting September. Shinee ranked eighth in Japan for their concert audience numbers in 2017, with approximately 539,000 attendees.

On December 18, 2017, Jonghyun died from suicide. His funeral was held on December 21 with the rest of Shinee and numerous artists in attendance, including Girls' Generation, IU, Super Junior, and more. Shinee was slated to have a series of concerts in Japan in February 2018, and after entering into discussions on whether to postpone them, they decided to continue promoting as a four-member group and proceed with their Japanese tour as scheduled. On March 26, Shinee released their Japanese single, "From Now On", posthumously featuring Jonghyun, and shortly after, the group released their first Japanese compilation, Shinee The Best From Now On.

On May 15, 2018, SM Entertainment revealed teasers for a three-part Korean album, titled The Story of Light. The first part of the album was released on May 28 with the single "Good Evening", and the second part of the trilogy was released on June 11 with the single "I Want You". According to the group, the second part of the album represents the group's view of themselves, while the first part reflected what others think of them. The third and last part of the album is fronted by the single "Our Page" and was released on June 25. On August 1, 2018, the Japanese versions of "Good Evening" and "I Want You" were released on Shinee's 15th Japanese single "Sunny Side", alongside the track of the same name, which was written by the group members. On September 10, 2018, Shinee released their sixth album repackage, The Story of Light Epilogue, consisting of all tracks from the previous three albums, and one new song, titled "Countless".

Onew applied and enlisted for his mandatory military service in December 2018. It was announced in early 2019 that both Key and Minho would be enlisting in the first half of the year. Key applied for military band service and enlisted on March 4, 2019. Minho enlisted in the Marines on April 15, 2019.

=== 2020–2025: Don't Call Me, Superstar and Hard ===
Onew was discharged from the military on July 8, 2020, followed by Key and Minho on September 24 and November 15, respectively. On January 6, 2021, SM Entertainment announced Shinee would return with a new album after two and a half years. The group's seventh Korean studio album Don't Call Me, featuring the album's title track as the lead single alongside its music video, was released on February 22, 2021. The album was commercially successful, debuting at number one on the Gaon Album Chart and receiving a Platinum certification from KMCA for over 250,000 copies sold. Using the Beyond Live platform, they held an online concert titled Shinee World on April 4, 2021, which recorded 130,000 viewers across 120 countries. A repackaged version of their seventh album, Atlantis, was released on April 12, 2021, featuring three new songs including the lead single of the same name.

On May 23, 2021, Shinee held an online fan meeting titled Bistro de Shinee to celebrate the tenth anniversary of their debut in Japan. They premiered their new Japanese single "Superstar" at the event, which was released on digital music platforms the following day. Taemin enlisted as part of the military band on May 31, becoming the final member of the group to enlist. On June 28, 2021, Shinee released the digital version of their new Japanese extended play Superstar, featuring five songs, their first Japanese release since 2018. The physical version was released on July 28, 2021. The EP became Shinee's fourth release to top the Oricon Albums Chart and was certified Gold by RIAJ for selling over 100,000 copies.

On April 4, 2023, Taemin was discharged from military service. On May 27–28, 2023, Shinee held a fan meeting titled Piece of Shine celebrating their 15th anniversary at the Jamsil Arena. The sold-out fan meeting was the first offline event for the group as a full unit since 2018. The second day of the fan meeting was live-streamed globally via Beyond Live and was simultaneously watched in 102 different regions. At the event, they revealed a new unreleased song called "The Feeling". Soon after, the band announced their sixth Asian concert tour, Shinee World VI: Perfect Illumination, starting with three shows held at the Olympic Gymnastics Arena in Seoul on June 23–25. They released their eighth studio album, Hard, on June 26, alongside the lead single of the same name. They continued touring in Japan from September. However, Onew was unable to participate in the tour and in promotional activities for their album due to health issues.

Shinee released a documentary film titled My Shinee World in November. The film, which commemorates their 15th anniversary, contains unseen footage from throughout their career. Following Onew's return, the tour was extended with three encore concerts, titled Shinee World VI Perfect Illumination: Shinee's Back, which were held at the Inspire Arena in Incheon on May 24–26, 2024, to celebrate their 16th debut anniversary. They held concerts in Seoul on May 23–25, 2025, titled Shinee World VII: E.S.S.A.Y, to mark their 17th anniversary. They also released a single album titled Poet | Artist; the album's title references Jonghyun's 2018 studio album of the same name, while the lead single was written by Jonghyun.

=== 2026–present: Atmos ===
The group held a series of concerts on May 29–31, 2026, in Seoul, titled The Trilogy I – Shinee World VIII: The Invert. They released their sixth EP, Atmos, on June 1, featuring the lead single of the same name.

== Members ==
Current

- Onew (온유)
- Key (키)
- Minho (민호)
- Taemin (태민)

Former

- Jonghyun (종현, died 2017)

=== Timeline ===
Note: Jonghyun still appears posthumously in The Story of Light and Poet | Artist despite his death on December 18, 2017.

== Artistry ==
=== Public image ===
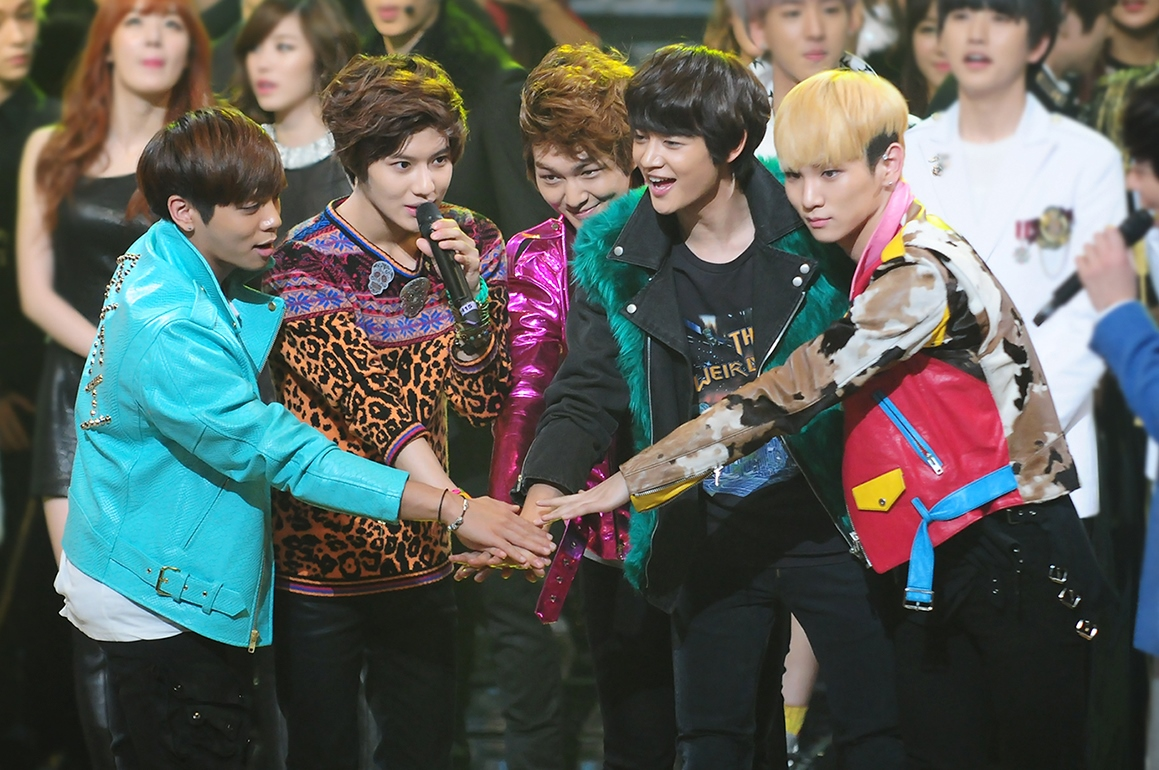
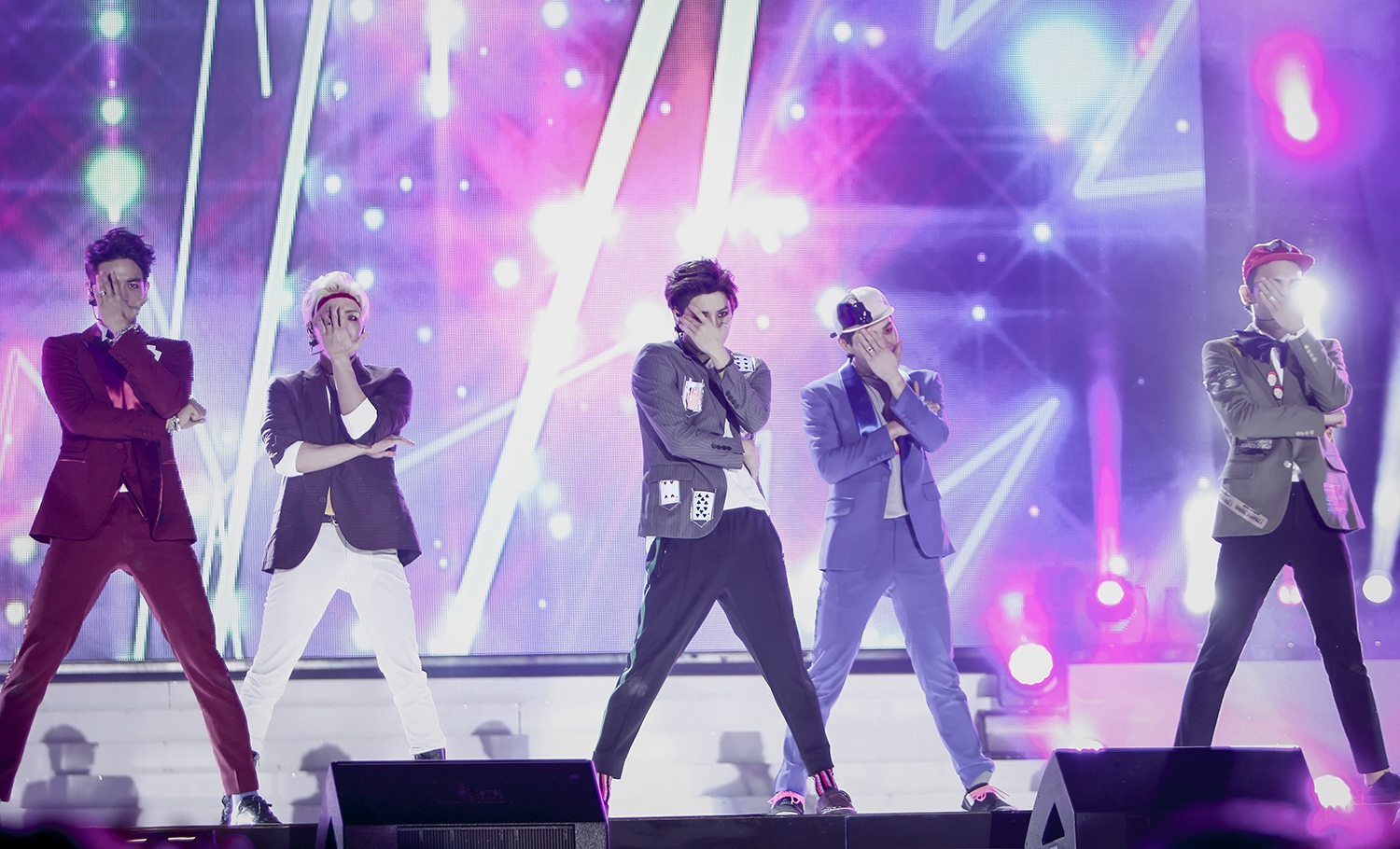
Despite the change of the concepts over the years the group's colorful and unique image always remained the main part of the group's fashion style (left: Shinee in 2012). With their later releases, the group aimed for a more mature image while maintaining their "boyish charm" (right: Shinee in 2015).

Shinee is known for their fashion style, initially created by designer Ha Sang-beg, which features high-top sneakers, skinny jeans, and colorful sweaters. Their style has created a fashion trend amongst students which the media dubbed the "Shinee Trend". The group's "boyish charm" was an important factor in Shinee gaining fans. With the release of 2009, Year of Us, Shinee's style became more mature, though still maintaining Shinee's unique image. Furthermore, instead of working with famous artists and photographers, SM Entertainment's Visual and Art Directing department usually works with up-and-coming talents with new ideas for Shinee's concepts. When Shinee debuted in 2008 with "Replay", it was not only their music which gained attention but also their colorful style – but even four years later, in 2012, Shinee maintained their colorful concept for Sherlock. Ha stated in an interview with The Korea Times: "Much has evolved over the years, since I change their styles to reflect their music. The feel from their debut single still exists, mixing the overground [sic] with the underground, haute couture with street fashion ... but it is very modern, like Shinee."

=== Vocals and choreography ===
Shinee are acknowledged for their "innovative approach to music and peerless choreography" and are considered some of the best live vocalists and dancers in Korean pop. They are known for their good vocal performances and complex choreographies, as well as a unique style of music that sets them apart from other K-pop artists. At SM Entertainment's showcase in New York in October 2011, Jon Caramanica of The New York Times summarized them as "the most ambitious" of the evening and also complimented the group's strong vocal performance. Furthermore, he stated: "Their music, especially "Replay", "Ring Ding Dong" and "Juliette", felt the riskiest, even if it only slightly tweaked that polyglot K-pop formula". Kim Joo-hyun of Beff Report considers Shinee's greatest strength the dismantling of the boundaries between the role of main vocal and subvocal. He positively emphasised the harmony between the two main vocals, Onew and Jonghyun, saying they sing with an aesthetic of "contrast", meaning they can't be separated from each other; on the contrary, they actually suit each other when brought together. He also praised the vocal development of Taemin, the youngest member in the group. Jakob Dorof of the monthly British style magazine Dazed described Shinee as possessing "technicolor visuals", "choreography as coordinated as ballet", and "wildly adventurous hit songs", stating they are a group that embodies the harmony of these qualities better than anyone else. Tamar Herman of Paste described Shinee as one of K-pop's most popular dance groups, "with cutting edge dance moves that are just as technically creative as the songs they've performed".

Shinee have worked with top choreographers such as Rino Nakasone, who choreographed Shinee's early songs like "Replay" and "Love Like Oxygen" in 2008, "Juliette" in 2009, and the group's hit single "Lucifer" in 2010, which was nominated for the Best Dance Performance at the Mnet Asian Music Awards in 2010. Misha Gabriel choreographed the songs "Amigo" (2008) and "Ring Ding Dong" (2009). Tony Testa worked on Shinee's later hit songs like "Sherlock (Clue + Note)" (2012) and "Dream Girl" (2013), which are characterized by a unique and distinctive style, while Ian Eastwood worked on "View" (2015) – breaking away from the group's usual powerful and precise choreography and working instead with a groove style that showcases the teamwork of the group. All three songs were awarded with the Best Dance Performance Award at the Mnet Asian Music Awards: in 2012, 2013, and 2015.

=== Musical style and themes ===
"I've learned there are quite a few things we can do as a group that wouldn't be possible if I were alone. So when we work together, we try more challenging things with everything. Even if we question whether we can pull it off, we always try. As Shinee, we have to keep striving and do things that are a bit more sophisticated and detailed."

— Member Jonghyun discussing the group's music styles.

The predominant musical genre of the group is contemporary R&B. The group's early singles like "Replay" and "Lucifer" were influenced by R&B and dance pop, while tracks such as "Get Down" and "JoJo" explored other musical styles such as hip-hop and dance. Shinee's third album is significantly influenced by funk rock, electronic music and rock. Billboard columnist Jeff Benjamin compared Shinee's songs like "Punch Drunk Love" and "Aside" to the sounds of Michael Jackson and Lionel Richie, while tracks like "Beautiful" and "Runaway" combine "unique electronic production elements over sugary boy band harmonies to create year-round pop music".

Shinee as a group is known for their experimental sound and ability to execute a wide range of genres. An example of this is the group's fifth extended play, Everybody, whose title song is classified under the complextro genre. Jakob Dorof of Tiny Mix Tapes stated that "Everybody is proof positive that, even in a culture industry designed to minimize the role of real musicianship, talent will find its way to the top." He also remarked that "Close the Door" highlights the experimental and versatile nature of Shinee's music which frequently charts into unfamiliar territories.

With the release of their fourth Korean album, Odd, Shinee returned to their old sound while experimenting with new genres like deep house. According to Key, Odd marked the first time the group had direct involvement in the album production process, including the decision over picking the lead single as well as the album's concept. The costumes were based on Key's ideas – a vintage, old-school [aesthetic], during a time when other groups mostly wore uniforms. The album spanned a variety of styles including the two singles – the deep house "View" and Rocky Horror-inspired funk track "Married to the Music". Alexis Hodoyan-Gastelum of MTV praised the lead single, "View", describing it as a "great, laid back summer jam" even though "the song fools us into thinking it's an uptempo ballad before reaching its techno peak at the chorus." Jeff Benjamin, on the other hand, praised "Odd Eye", which is written and composed by member Jonghyun. Benjamin states the group's "return to the R&B side of Shinee with feathery vocals, tight harmonies and member Onew's falsetto howls acting a centerpiece to this grooving opener" but he also adds, "despite initially debuting with a R&B sound, Shinee is arguably most exciting when experimenting".

== Endorsements ==
Early in their career, Shinee were endorsers for several brands, such as the cosmetic brand Nana's B and the sports brand Reebok. Later, they endorsed the clothing brand Maypole as well as the popular Korean cosmetic brands Etude House and The Saem. In 2012, Etude House's Lash Pump 3-Step Volume-Cara, a PC-based and mobile micro-site featuring "doll eyelashes" main model Sandara Park and Shinee – appearing as puppets – was awarded first place in the Mobile Marketing and Product Promotions categories at the 9th Web Awards Korea. The group was also part of the popular Korean comic The Blade of the Phantom Master and webtoon series ENT. Furthermore, the group endorsed the sports brand Skechers and collaborated with Naver and Skechers for T-shirts and caps designed by the group members. In March 2023, K-beauty brand Dr.G appointed Shinee as their global ambassador in hopes of expanding the brand's global market with their strong fan base both in Korea and abroad.

Companies whose products are promoted by the Shinee label often see increased revenue; for example, "Shinee's Sparkling Water", a carbonated bottled water sold by E-mart, boasted a combined sales of 67 million won over a one-month period.

== Discography ==
Korean albums

- The Shinee World (2008)
- Lucifer (2010)
- The Misconceptions of Us (2013)
- Odd (2015)
- 1 of 1 (2016)
- The Story of Light (2018)
- Don't Call Me (2021)
- Hard (2023)

Japanese albums

- The First (2011)
- Boys Meet U (2013)
- I'm Your Boy (2014)
- D×D×D (2016)
- Five (2017)

== Tours ==
=== Asia tours ===
- Shinee World (2010–2011)
- Shinee World II (2012)
- Shinee World IV (2015)
- Shinee World VI: Perfect Illumination (2023–2024)

=== World tours ===
- Shinee World III (2014)
- Shinee World V (2016–2017)

=== Japan tours ===
- Shinee World 2012 (2012)
- Shinee World 2013 ~Boys Meet U~ (2013)
- Shinee World 2014 ~I'm Your Boy~ (2014)
- Shinee World 2016 ~DxDxD~ (2016)
- Shinee World 2017 ~Five~ (2017)
- Shinee World The Best 2018 ~From Now On~ (2018)

=== Concerts ===
- Shinee World VII: E.S.S.A.Y (2025)
- Shinee World VIII: The Invert (2026)

=== Online concerts ===
- Beyond Live – Shinee: Shinee World (2021)

== Filmography ==
Films

- I Am (2012)
- SM Town: The Stage (2015)
- My Shinee World (2023)

Reality shows

- Shinee's Yunhanam (2008)
- Shinee's Hello Baby (2010)
- World Date with Shinee (2012)
- Shinee's One Fine Day (2013)
- Shinee's Back (2018)
- Shinee Inc. (2021)
- Shinee's 15m (2023)
- Shinee no Hako (2024)

== Publications ==
- Children of the Sun: Onew, Key, Taemin of Shinee in Barcelona, Woongjin Think Big Co., Ltd (September 12, 2011) ISBN 8901136058
- Shinee Surprise Vacation – Travel Note, SM Entertainment (May 27, 2013), ISBN 8996955434
