= Sherlock (Clue + Note) =

- Japanese CD first press cover

Single by Shinee

from the EP Sherlock and the album Boys Meet U
- Language: Korean; Japanese
- B-side: "Keeping Love Again"
- Released: March 19, 2012
- Recorded: 2012
- Studio: SM Concert Hall (Seoul); SM Yellow Tail (Seoul)
- Genre: New jack swing; hip-hop
- Length: 3:59
- Label: SM; KT
- Composers: Thomas Troelsen; Rufio Sandilands; Rocky Morris; Thomas Eriksen
- Lyricist: Jo Yoon-kyung
- Producers: Thomas Troelsen; Thomas Eriksen

Shinee singles chronology
"Lucifer" (2011)	"Sherlock (Clue + Note)" (2012)	"Dazzling Girl" (2012)

Music video
- "Sherlock (Clue + Note)" on YouTube

"Sherlock (Clue + Note)" is a song recorded by South Korean boy band Shinee as the lead single for their fourth extended play, Sherlock. It was released on March 19, 2012, through SM Entertainment. A mashup of two different tracks, "Sherlock (Clue + Note)" is often considered K-pop's first "hybrid remix". It was composed and arranged by Thomas Troelsen, Rufio Sandilands, Rocky Morris and Thomas Eriksen, with lyrics penned by Jo Yoon-kyung. The song was commercially successful, reaching number one on the Gaon Digital Chart. A Japanese version was released on May 16, 2012.

== Development and composition ==
"Sherlock (Clue + Note)" is the combination of two separate album tracks spliced together: "Clue" and "Note". It is credited as K-pop's first ever "hybrid remix". The song was produced by a team of around 30 people in SM's A&R department, who sifted through over 100 songs, taking them apart and putting them together again. Each song was divided into parts so they could be combined together, and the same process was followed with the lyrics to create a cohesive track. Lee Sung-soo, head of SM's A&R department, described it as "one of the most difficult experiences" but "very rewarding".

"Clue" forms the "bulk of the instrumentation", and has been described as both new jack swing and hip hop. It features "a beat made out of a digitized kettle, little spurts of brass, and the recurring sound of shattered glass". In contrast, "Note" is "striding, percussive" and vocal-driven. It features most prominently in the "incendiary" chorus, which is carried by explosive harmonies. The beginning of the song also incorporates "soaring strings" that later reappeared in Shinee's 2013 song "Spoiler". The lyrics contain a Sherlock Holmes theme; the Sherlock character depicted in the song uses the reason of "Clue" and intuition of "Note" to solve a case.

== Release and promotion ==
"Sherlock (Clue + Note)" was Shinee's first Korean single since "Hello" (2010), following a year's absence due to touring and Japanese promotions. It was released on March 19, 2012, alongside the rest of the EP. Shinee promoted the song for four weeks, beginning with an appearance on March 22 on M Countdown. A Japanese version, titled "Sherlock", was released on May 16, 2012, with the song "Keeping Love Again" as a B-side. It was later included on Shinee's second Japanese album, Boys Meet U.

== Critical reception ==
"Sherlock (Clue + Note)" received generally positive reviews from music critics. Rolling Stone cited it as an example of "how innovative and experimental K-pop can get, even for its most mainstream acts". They twice named it one of the greatest boy band songs of all time, first in 2015 and again in 2020. Writing for Dazed, Taylor Glasby praised the song's complexity and the "confrontational energy" of Shinee's performance. She said that it "signalled a coming of age for the band" and "allowed Shinee to step into a sphere that was entirely their own". According to Billboard, ""Sherlock"" places a magnifying glass over the ways the Korean industry’s innovation is pushing music forward". They named it one of the best K-pop songs of the 2010s.

"Sherlock (Clue + Note)" on critic lists
Publication	List	Rank	Ref.
Billboard	100 Greatest K-Pop Songs of the 2010s	6	
The Dong-a Ilbo	Best Male Idol Songs from the Past 20 Years	5	
IZM	Best Korean Singles of 2012	—	
Melon	Top 100 K-pop Songs of All-Time	11	
Popjustice	Top 15 K‑Pop Singles of 2012	14	
Rolling Stone	75 Greatest Boy Band Songs of All Time	14	
Spin	Top 20 K-pop Singles of 2012	4	

== Accolades ==
Awards and nominations for "Sherlock (Clue + Note)"
Ceremony	Year	Category	Result	Ref.
Mnet 20's Choice Awards	2012	20's Performance	Nominated	
Mnet Asian Music Awards	2012	Best Dance Performance – Male Group	Won	
Mnet Asian Music Awards	2012	Song of the Year	Nominated	
Singapore Entertainment Awards	2013	Most Popular Music Video	Nominated	

Music program awards
Program	Date	Ref.
Show Champion	March 27, 2012	
Show Champion	April 3, 2012	
M Countdown	March 29, 2012	
Inkigayo	April 1, 2012	
Inkigayo	April 8, 2012	
Inkigayo	April 15, 2012	
Music Bank	April 6, 2012	
Music Bank	April 13, 2012	

== Commercial performance ==
"Sherlock (Clue + Note)" debuted at number one on the weekly Gaon Digital Chart. It also peaked at number three on the K-pop Hot 100. The song recorded 1,720,124 downloads in South Korea in 2012, ranking at number 74 on the year-end Gaon Download Chart. It also placed 81st on the year-end Gaon Digital Chart. In the U.S., it reached number four on Billboard World Digital Song Sales and charted for ten weeks. As of December 2017, "Sherlock (Clue + Note)" has received 30,000 downloads in the U.S., making it Shinee's fourth best-selling single in the country.

== Music video ==
The music video was filmed in early March in Namyangju and was directed by Cho Su-hyun. It is set in a museum and shows the members taking on the role of detectives solving a case. Jessica of Girls' Generation makes an appearance as the mysterious female lead. A teaser for the music video was uploaded to SM Entertainment's social media accounts on March 21, followed by the music video's release on March 22. It received over a million views in one day.

The choreography was created by American choreographer Tony Testa. It was his first time working with a K-pop group. Testa completed the choreography in ten days, travelling back and forth between Korea and the US to meet with Shinee and the songwriter. Upon seeing the members' abilities, he decided to give them choreography that would help them grow. The concept is that the members are all one person. Testa took inspiration from the shadow effects in the film The Matrix, and tried to "create the illusion" that the members were "alone, retracing memories, their blurred bodies trailing behind as if trying to piece together their lives". Critic Kim Jak-ga described it as "a textbook example of the razor-sharp choreography that has become the hallmark of K-pop".

== Credits and personnel ==
Credits adapted from Melon.

- Shinee – vocals
- Jo Yoon-kyung – lyrics
- Thomas Troelsen – composition, arranged
- Rufio Sandilands – composition, arranged
- Rocky Morris – composition, arranged
- Thomas Eriksen – composition, arranged

== Charts ==
=== Korean version ===
Chart performance for "Sherlock (Clue + Note)"
Chart (2012)	Peak position
South Korea (Gaon)	1
South Korea (K-pop Hot 100)	3
US World Digital Song Sales (Billboard)	4

=== Japanese version ===
Chart performance for "Sherlock"
Chart (2012)	Peak position
Japan (Japan Hot 100)	4
Japan (Oricon)	2

== Release history ==
Release history and formats for "Sherlock (Clue + Note)"
Region	Date	Format	Version	Label	Ref.
Various	March 19, 2012	Digital download; streaming	Korean	SM; KT	
Japan	May 16, 2012	CD; digital download; streaming	Japanese	EMI	
