= Swapna Sundari =

Swapna Sundari (lit. 'dream girl') may refer to:

- Swapna Sundari (dancer), Indian dancer
- Swapna Sundari (film), a 1950 Indian Telugu-language film
- Swapnasundari, an upcoming Indian Malayalam-language film
- Soppana Sundari, a 2023 Indian Tamil-language film by SG Charles
- Soppana Sundhari, a 2023 Sri Lankan Tamil-language film
- Soppanasundari, alternative title of the 2016 Indian film Chennai 600028 II

== See also ==
- Dream Girl (disambiguation)
