= It girl (disambiguation) =

An "it girl" is a young woman perceived to have both sex appeal and an engaging personality.

It girl or The It Girl may also refer to:

== People ==
- Clara Bow (1905–1965), American actress, so nicknamed after her 1927 film It

== Literature ==
- The It Girl (novel series), by Cecily von Ziegesar
  - The It Girl (novel), the 2005 first novel in the series
- The IT Girl, a novel by Ruth Ware
- It Girl, an Atomics comic book character

== Music ==
- The It Girl (album), by Sleeper, 1996
- "It Girl", a song by The Brian Jonestown Massacre from Thank God for Mental Illness, 1996
- "It Girl", a song by Apink from Seven Springs of Apink, 2011
- "It Girl" (Jason Derulo song), 2011
- "It Girl" (Pharrell Williams song), 2014
- It Girl (EP), by Petric, 2015
- "It Girl", a song by Elle King from Shake the Spirit, 2018
- "It Girl", a song by Bladee from 333 (Bladee album), 2020
- "It Girl" (Aliyah's Interlude song), 2023
- "It Girl" (Jade Thirlwall song), 2025

== Television ==
- It Girl (Yellowjackets), an episode of the American TV series Yellowjackets

== See also ==
- It Girls, a 2002 documentary film
