= Petric (duo) =

Canadian country music band

- Origin: Winnipeg, Manitoba, Canada
- Genres: Country, country rock
- Years active: 2015–present
- Labels: Steelhead; RRMG
- Members: Jason Petric; Tom Petric; Jordan Day
- Website: http://www.petricmusic.com/

Petric is a Canadian country music band composed of brothers Jason and Tom Petric from Transcona, Winnipeg, Manitoba, along with the brothers' long time friend and band member, Jordan Day. The band officially formed in 2014 and became the first act signed to Dallas Smith's record label Steelhead Music in May 2015. Their debut single, "Here Goes Everything", reached the top 25 on the Billboard Canada Country chart. It is featured on their debut extended play, It Girl, released October 16, 2015.

== Background ==
Petric is composed of Jason Petric (b. 1989) on guitar and background / harmony vocals, Tom Petric (b. 1992) on lead vocals and Jordan Day on background / harmony vocals . Jason has been working in the music industry since he was fifteen, having previously released two solo albums between 2011 and 2014, and previously served as a back-up guitarist for Manitoban acts. Tom has been training as a singer since age four and became involved with many of his brother's musical projects. "No matter what direction music took us individually," Jason explained to Canadian country music blog Top Country, "we always ended up on stage together," so the brothers decided in 2014 to form a country music group together. The duo performed at the JunoFest and Canadian Country Music Awards showcases in 2014. They were introduced to fellow musician Dallas Smith, who was at the time establishing his then-new record label Steelhead Music, through these events and they later signed to his label.

== Discography ==
=== Albums ===
Title	Details
Flashbacks	Release date: January 15, 2021; Label: Petric Music Inc.; Format: CD, Digital download, Stream

=== Extended plays ===
Title	Details
It Girl	Release date: October 16, 2015; Label: Steelhead Music; Format: Digital download
18 Ends	Release date: November 17, 2017; Label: Steelhead Music; Format: Digital download

=== Singles ===
Year	Title	Peak chart positions		Album
Year	Title	CAN Country	AUS Country	Album
2015	"Here Goes Everything"	22	—	It Girl
2015	"It Girl"	29	—	It Girl
2016	"All She Wrote"	29	—	It Girl
2017	"Play It Safe"	39	—	18 Ends
2017	"18 Ends"	15	—	18 Ends
2018	"Can't Say No"	35	—	18 Ends
2019	"Single Problem"	24	—	Flashbacks
2019	"Something to Do with You"	—	—	Flashbacks
2020	"Déjà Vu"	—	—	Flashbacks
2021	"Kids"	41	—	Flashbacks
2021	"White Lyin'"	—	35	Flashbacks
2022	"Flirtin'" (with Hayley Jensen)	—	23	Non-album singles
2022	"Night Up"	—	—	Non-album singles
2024	"Over a Girl"	—	—	Non-album singles
2024	"The Best"	54	—	Non-album singles
"—" denotes releases that did not chart

=== Music videos ===
Year	Title	Director
2015	"Here Goes Everything" (Acoustic)	Chris Gaudry
2016	"It Girl"	Chris Gaudry
2016	"All She Wrote"	Chris Gaudry
2018	"18 Ends"	
2019	"Single Problem"	
2020	"Something to Do with You"	
2020	"Déjà Vu"	

== Awards and nominations ==
Year	Award	Category	Nominated work	Result
2015	Manitoba Country Music Awards	Group/Duo of the Year	—N/a	Won
2016	Manitoba Country Music Awards	Single of the Year	"All She Wrote"	Won
2016	Manitoba Country Music Awards	Music Video of the Year	"All She Wrote"	Won
2016	Manitoba Country Music Awards	Album of the Year	"It Girl"	Won
2016	Canadian Radio Music Awards	Best New Group or Solo Artist: Country	—N/a	Nominated
