= It Girl (EP) =

EP by Petric
- Released: October 16, 2015
- Recorded: 2015
- Genre: Country
- Length: 18:23
- Label: Steelhead Music
- Producer: Scott Cooke

Petric chronology
It Girl (2015)	18 Ends (2017)

Singles from It Girl
- 1. "Here Goes Everything" Released: May 21, 2015; 2. "It Girl" Released: October 23, 2015; 3. "All She Wrote" Released: April 8, 2016

It Girl is the debut EP recorded by Canadian country music duo Petric. It was released October 16, 2015, through Steelhead Music. The collection includes the top 25 Canada Country hit "Here Goes Everything".

== Background and release ==
In May 2015, Petric was announced as the first artist signed by Canadian singer Dallas Smith's then-new record label Steelhead Music. They released their debut single, "Here Goes Everything", on May 21, 2015, and it first impacted Canadian country radio on May 26, 2015. It Girl was released October 16, 2015, along with the single release of its title track. An acoustic version of the EP, titled It Girl (Stripped Down), was released December 9, 2016.

== Promotion ==
The duo joined the western leg of Smith's Tippin' Point Tour in January and February 2015, where they began debuting the songs from It Girl. They held an album launch party at the Park Theatre in Winnipeg, Manitoba, on November 25, 2015.

== Critical reception ==
Amanda Hather of Canadian Beats rated the EP four-and-a-half stars out of five, writing, "the vocals and harmonies on this EP are very impressive and go to show how much talent the duo has."

== Track listing ==
It Girl – Standard edition
No.	Title	Writer(s)	Length
1.	"Band of Brothers"	Jason Petric; Tom Petric; Chris Burke-Gaffney; Carolyn Dawn Johnson	3:03
2.	"It Girl"		2:58
3.	"All She Wrote"		2:43
4.	"Here Goes Everything"		3:04
5.	"Everything U Got"	Dustin James; Jason Massey; John King	3:31
6.	"Let the World Roll By"		3:04
Total length:			18:23

It Girl (Stripped Down)
No.	Title	Writer(s)	Length
1.	"It Girl"		2:57
2.	"All She Wrote"		2:40
3.	"Here Goes Everything"		2:57
4.	"Everything U Got"	James; Massey; King	3:28
5.	"Let the World Roll By"		3:03
6.	"Band of Brothers"	J. Petric; T. Petric; Burke-Gaffney; Johnson	2:57
Total length:			18:02

== Charts ==
=== Singles ===
Year	Single	Peak chart positions
Year	Single	CAN Country
2015	"Here Goes Everything"	22
2015	"It Girl"	29
2016	"All She Wrote"	29

== Release history ==
Country	Date	Format	Version	Label	Ref.
Canada	October 16, 2015	Digital download	Original	Steelhead Music	
Canada	December 9, 2016	Digital download	Stripped Down	Steelhead Music	
