= 1000nen, Zutto Soba ni Ite... =

- CD cover

Single by Shinee

from the album Boys Meet U
- Language: Japanese
- B-side: "Kimi ga Iru Sekai"
- Released: December 12, 2012
- Recorded: 2012
- Studio: In Grid (Seoul)
- Genre: J-pop; R&B
- Length: 4:17
- Label: EMI
- Composers: Jimmy Richard; Steven Lee; Najja Iman; Du Ry Moon
- Lyricist: Junji Ishiwatari
- Producers: Jiro Koyasu; Lee Soo-man

Shinee Japanese singles chronology
"Dazzling Girl" (2012)	"1000nen, Zutto Soba ni Ite..." (2012)	"Fire" (2013)

Music video
- "1000nen, Zutto Soba ni Ite..." on YouTube

"1000nen, Zutto Soba ni Ite..." (1000年、ずっとそばにいて..., Sennen, Zutto Soba ni Ite...; For 1000 Years, Always Be By My Side...) is the sixth Japanese single by South Korean boy group Shinee. It was released on December 12, 2012.

== Background and release ==
The ballad "1000nen, Zutto Soba ni Ite..." was released on December 12, 2012. The B-side track, "Kimi ga Iru Sekai", is another ballad, with piano and percussion. The single comes with a bonus DVD, a 28-page book with photos and lyrics, and a trading card. The music video was released on November 26, 2012.

== Track listing ==
Limited edition and CD only standard edition
No.	Title	Lyrics	Music	Length
1.	"1000nen, Zutto Soba ni Ite..."	Junji Ishiwatari	Steven Lee, The Goldfingerz, Jimmy Richard	4:16
2.	"Kimi ga Iru Sekai" (君がいる世界 "The World Where You Exist")	H.u.b	Dapo Torimiro, Jamie Houston	3:22
Total length:				7:39

CD only standard edition:
No.	Title	Length
3.	"1000nen, Zutto Soba ni Ite..." (instrumental)	4:16
4.	"Kimi ga Iru Sekai" (instrumental)	3:22

DVD (limited edition)
No.	Title	Length
1.	"1000nen, Zutto Soba ni Ite..." (music video – complete ver.)
2.	"1000nen, Zutto Soba ni Ite..." (music video – director's cut ver.)
3.	"1000nen, Zutto Soba ni Ite..." (jacket & music video shooting sketch)

== Chart performance ==
=== Oricon chart ===
Oricon chart performance
Released	Oricon Chart	Peak	Debut sales	Sales total
December 12, 2012	Daily Singles Chart	2	22,954	45,353+
December 12, 2012	Weekly Singles Chart	3	40,017	45,353+
December 12, 2012	Monthly Singles Chart	10	45,353	45,353+

=== Other charts ===
Chart performance on other charts
Country	Chart	Peak position
Japan	Billboard Japan Adult Contemporary Airplay	42
Japan	Billboard Japan Hot Top Airplay	6
Japan	Billboard Japan Hot Singles Sales	3
Japan	Billboard Japan Hot 100	3

== Release history ==
Release history and formats for "1000nen, Zutto Soba ni Ite..."
Country	Date	Format	Label
Japan	December 12, 2012	CD, Digital download	EMI Music Japan
South Korea	June 12, 2013	Digital download	SM Entertainment
