= Dream Girl (2026 film) =

Tamil-language love romance drama film

- Directed by: M. R. Bharathi
- Written by: M. R. Bharathi
- Produced by: M. Kaveri Manian
- Starring: Jeeva Rajendran; Harisha Jestin; Prabhu Sastha
- Cinematography: N. Solomon Boaz D. S.
- Edited by: SP. Ahmed
- Music by: Ilamaran
- Production company: Charulatha Films
- Release date: 13 February 2026
- Country: India
- Language: Tamil

Dream Girl is an Indian Tamil-language love romance drama film written and directed by M. R. Bharathi. The film is produced by M. Kaveri Manian under the banner Charulatha Films. It stars Jeeva Rajendran, Harisha Jestin, and Prabhu Sastha in lead roles. The film is scheduled for theatrical release on 13 February 2026.

== Cast ==
- Jeeva Rajendran
- Harisha Jestin
- Prabhu Sastha

== Production ==
The film is written and directed by M. R. Bharathi. It is produced by M. Kaveri Manian under Charulatha Films. Cinematography is handled by N. Solomon Boaz D. S., while editing is done by SP. Ahmed. The music for the film is composed by Ilamaran.

== Reception ==
Virakesari critic wrote that "The newcomers who have played the characters Arjun, Aravind, and Mahesh have followed the director's vision and made a sincere effort to grab attention." Maalai Malar critic stated that "He has tried to provide a compelling romantic experience."
