= Boys Meet U =

- Digital cover

Studio album by Shinee
- Released: June 26, 2013
- Recorded: 2012–13
- Studio: In Grid (Seoul)
- Genre: J-pop
- Length: 45:57
- Languages: Japanese; English
- Label: EMI

Shinee chronology
Sherlock (2012)	Boys Meet U (2013)	The Misconceptions of Us (2013)

Singles from Boys Meet U
- 1. "Sherlock" Released: May 16, 2012; 2. "Dazzling Girl" Released: October 10, 2012; 3. "1000-nen, Zutto Soba ni Ite..." Released: December 12, 2012; 4. "Fire" Released: March 13, 2013

Boys Meet U is the second Japanese studio album by the South Korean boy band SHINee, released on June 26, 2013, in Japan by EMI Records Japan.

== Background ==
A Japanese version of "Sherlock (Clue + Note)" was released in Japan on May 16, 2012, as SHINee's fourth Japanese single. It included the original Japanese song "Keeping Love Again" as a B-side. The single was released in two versions: a limited edition that came with a bonus DVD, a 28-page photo booklet, and a trading card, and a regular edition with a poster photo booklet. The single peaked at number two on Oricon's daily and weekly singles charts.

== Singles and release ==
Four of the songs from the album, "Sherlock", "Dazzling Girl", "1000-nen, Zutto Soba ni Ite..." and "Fire", were released as A-side singles in Japan. Additionally, a fifth track, "Breaking News," was aired on Tokyo FM during Yamada Hisashi's Radian Limited F. The short version of the music video for "Breaking News" was released on June 21, 2013, on Universal Music Japan's official YouTube channel. The album's initial announcement was made on March 25, 2013, and the full list of tracks, along with a preview in the form of a medley, was released on June 23, 2013.

The album was released on June 26, 2013, on online music portal sites for digital download as well as in three different physical versions, regular CD version, a CD + DVD version and a limited edition which contains a CD, a DVD, and a photo book. It was certified Gold by RIAJ for selling 100,000 copies.

== Track listing ==
Boys Meet U track listing
No.	Title	Lyrics	Music	Arrangement	Length
1.	"Password"	Natsumi Kobayashi	Niclas Lundin; Maria Marcus; Andreas Moe; Hiten Bharadia	Lundin; Cosmos Music; Bharadia	4:52
2.	"Breaking News"	Hidenori Tanaka (Agehasprings)	Steven Lee; Drew Ryan Scott; Andreas Öberg	Lee	3:38
3.	"Dazzling Girl"	Sara Sakurai (T's Music); Rx	Scott; Rob. A!; Justin Trugman; Jaakko Manninen; Walter Afanasieff; Rx	Scott; Rob. A!; Trugman; Manninen; Afanasieff	3:32
4.	"1000-nen, Zutto Soba ni Ite..." (1000年、ずっとそばにいて...)	Junji Ishiwatari	Lee; Jimmy Richard; Goldfingerz	Lee; Richard; Goldfingerz	4:16
5.	"Run With Me"	Kanata Okajima	Peter Habib (Mr. Fantastic); Adam Nierow (Mr. Fantastic); Erika Nuri	Mr. Fantastic	3:21
6.	"Kiss Yo"	Sakurai	Anders Wigelius; Erik Wigelius	Anders Wigelius; Erik Wigelius	4:14
7.	"The World Where You Exist" (Kimi ga Iru Sekai (君がいる世界))	H.U.B	Dapo Torimiro; Jamie Houston	Torimiro	3:22
8.	"Keeping Love Again"	Sakurai	Darren Martyn; Daisuke Shikata	Martyn; Shikata	3:54
9.	"Burning Up!"	Sakurai	Lee; Jorge Mhondera; Paul Drew (DWB Music); Greig Watts (DWB Music); Pete Barringer (DWB Music)	Lee; Mhondera; DWB Music	3:35
10.	"Sherlock" (Japanese version)	Kobayashi; Jo Yoon-kyung	Thomas Troelsen; Rufio Sandilands (Pegasus); Rocky Morris (Pegasus); Thomas Eriksen	Troelsen; Pegasus; Eriksen	3:57
11.	"Fire"	Ishiwatari	Shikata; Erik Lidbom	Tak Miyazawa; Bach Logic	3:36
12.	"I'm With You"	H.U.B	Sammy Naja; Scott; Josef Salimi	Naja; Scott; Salimi	4:05
Total length:					46:22

== Charts ==
=== Weekly charts ===
Chart performance for Boys Meet U
Chart (2013)	Peak position
Japanese Albums (Oricon)	2

=== Year-end charts ===
Year-end chart performance for Boys Meet U
Chart (2013)	Position
Japanese Albums (Oricon)	92

== Release history ==
Release dates and formats for Boys Meet U
Region	Date	Format	Label
Japan	June 26, 2013	CD; digital download	EMI
South Korea	July 5, 2013	Digital download	SM
