= Sherlock (EP) =

- Digital cover

EP by Shinee
- Released: March 19, 2012
- Studios: SM Concert Hall (Seoul); SM Yellow Tail (Seoul)
- Genre: K-pop
- Length: 25:37
- Languages: Korean; English
- Label: SM

Shinee chronology
The First (2011)	Sherlock (2012)	Boys Meet U (2013)

Singles from Sherlock
- 1. "Sherlock (Clue + Note)" Released: March 19, 2012

Music video
- "Sherlock (Clue + Note)" on YouTube

Sherlock is the fourth EP of the South Korean boy group Shinee. The EP consists of seven tracks, including the title song "Sherlock (Clue + Note)", a "hybrid remix" of two songs. It was released on March 19, 2012, under the label SM Entertainment. It was Shinee's first Korean release after a year and six months hiatus.

The EP was commercially successful, charting at number one on the Gaon Album Chart. It was the fifth best-selling album of the year in South Korea, with over 180,000 copies sold. It also placed tenth on the Billboard Heatseekers Albums and fifth on the Billboard World Albums charts.

== Composition ==
The EP consists of seven songs in a variety of styles. The lead single, "Sherlock (Clue + Note)", is a "hybrid remix", which means it consists of two independent songs ("Clue" and "Note") remixed together to create a new song. The lyrics describe Sherlock's solving of a crime through logical "clues" and intuitive "notes". The title song combines the lyrics from the two songs to create a single storyline. "Honesty" was written by member Jonghyun and expresses the group's appreciation towards their fans. "The Reason" features a guitar solo and strings, while "Alarm Clock" was also written by Jonghyun and tells about a man who wants to wake up from the nightmares of a breakup. Minho participated in composing the rap. "Stranger", the main theme song of Strangers 6, has a melody composed by Kenzie.

== Artwork and packaging ==
The packaging for Sherlock contains six booklets: one for each member and another containing the CD. The album artwork was revealed sequentially from March 8, starting with photos of a half-naked Minho as a "French boy". The photoshoot drew attention for its use of nudity and suggestive poses, as well as Shinee's skinny, "almost prepubescent" bodies. The members dieted for two weeks before the photoshoot. Shinee stated that the aim was to show the bodyline, and bright lighting was used to obscure their muscles. Despite this, Jonghyun's muscles were still visible and had to be digitally removed. The photoshoot was controversial for its sexual nature, with some fans accusing creative director Min Hee-jin of promoting shotacon. In an interview with KBS program Entertainment Weekly, Taemin commented that he wanted to look like an adult, but his body resembled that of a child instead.

== Release and promotion ==
Sherlock was Shinee's first Korean release after a year-and-a-half hiatus since the reissue Hello. The EP was digitally released on March 19, 2012, and physically released on March 21. On March 22, 2012, the group started their official promotions and performed the title song for the first time on M Countdown. This was followed by appearances on other South Korean music programs such as Inkigayo and Music Bank.

The music video for the title song was released on March 22. It was directed by Cho Su-hyun and shot in early March at the studios in Namyangju. Shinee can be seen in an 1800s-like museum acting like detectives working on a case. Girls’ Generation's Jessica makes a special appearance in the music video as a mysterious female lead who offers a decisive clue in figuring out the incident.

== Commercial performance and reception ==
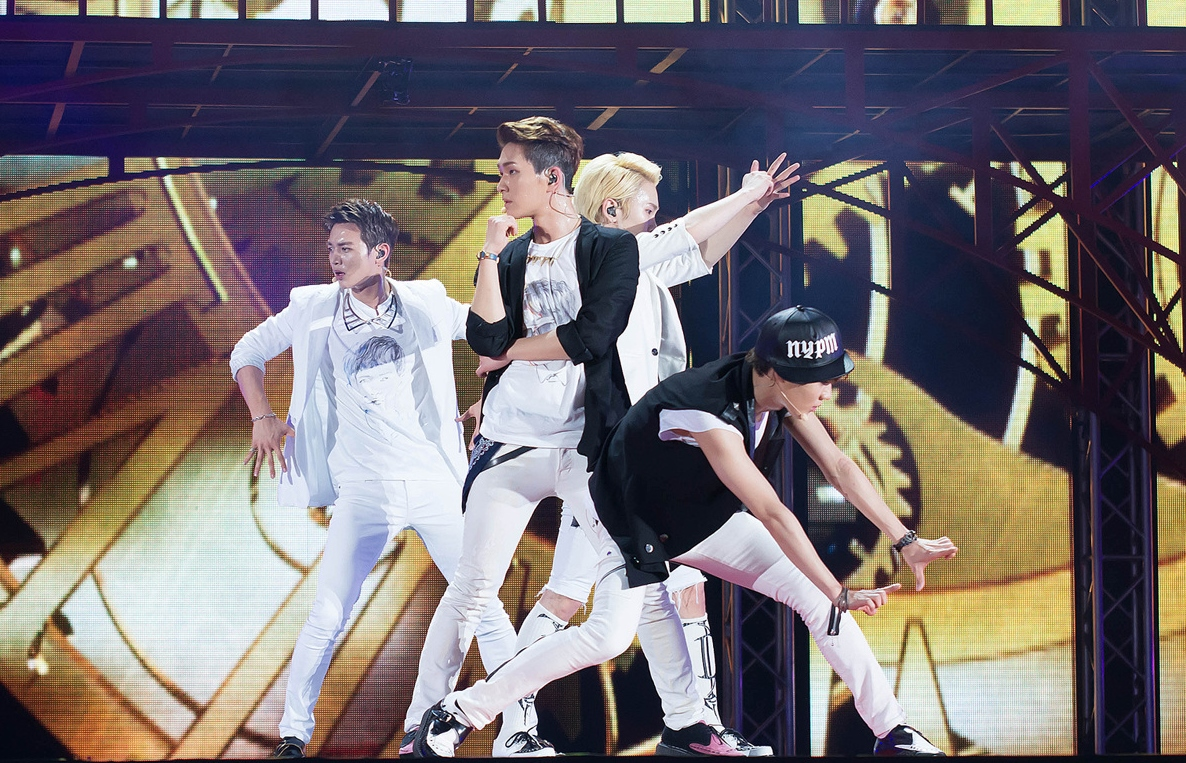
Shinee performing "Sherlock (Clue + Note)" at the MBC Korean Music Wave in Bangkok on March 16, 2013

The EP sold over 135,000 copies at release and ranked number one on the Gaon Album Chart, making it the best-selling release of March 2012. It was the fifth best-selling album of the year in South Korea, with over 180,000 copies sold. It placed at number five on the Billboard World Albums chart and number ten on the Billboard Heatseekers chart. In April, the group won first place for two consecutive weeks on Music Bank and three times on Inkigayo. Shinee performed their final music stage on MBC's Music Core on April 21, 2012.

Hwang Sun-up of IZM magazine gave the EP 3.5 out of 5 stars, praising the experimental attempt to create the title track "Sherlock" by mixing up "Clue" and "Note" as well as the lyrics for each song. However, he was disappointed with the remaining songs on the EP, stating these feel more ordinary compared to the impact of the first three tracks.

== Accolades ==
Awards and nominations for Sherlock
Ceremony	Year	Category	Result	Ref.
Golden Disc Awards	2013	Disc Bonsang	Won	
Golden Disc Awards	2013	Disc Daesang	Nominated	
Red Dot Design Award	2014	Communication Design – Music Packaging	Won	

== Track listing ==
Sherlock track listing
No.	Title	Lyrics	Music	Arrangement	Length
1.	"Sherlock (Clue + Note)" (셜록; Syeollok)	Jo Yoon-kyung	Thomas Troelsen; Rufio Sandilands (Pegasus); Rocky Morris (Pegasus); Thomas Eriksen	Troelsen; Pegasus; Eriksen	3:57
2.	"Clue"	Jo	Troelsen; Eriksen	Troelsen; Eriksen	3:37
3.	"Note"	Jo	Troelsen; Sandilands; Morris	Troelsen; Pegasus	2:46
4.	"Alarm Clock" (알람시계; Allamsigye)	Jonghyun; Minho^{[a]}	Niara Scarlett; Philippe-Marc Anquetil (BNA Productions); Christopher Lee-Joe (BNA Productions); Iain James	Scarlett; BNA Productions; James	3:59
5.	"The Reason"	Kwak So-young	Sim Eun-jee	Yoo Han-jin	4:17
6.	"Stranger (Korean Version)" (낯선자; Natseonja)	Kim Jeong-bae; Minho^{[a]}	Kenzie	Kenzie	3:13
7.	"Honesty" (늘 그 자리에; Neul Geu Jari-e)	Jonghyun; Minho^{[a]}	Brandon Fraley	Fraley	3:52
Total length:					25:37

Notes

- ^{^[a]} Minho is credited for writing the rap lyrics.

== Charts ==
=== Weekly charts ===
Weekly chart performance for Sherlock
Chart (2012)	Peak position
Japanese Albums (Oricon)	13
South Korean Albums (Gaon)	1
UK Independent Album Breakers (OCC)	18
US Heatseekers Albums (Billboard)	10
US World Albums (Billboard)	5

=== Monthly charts ===
Monthly chart performance for Sherlock
Chart (2012)	Peak position
South Korean Albums (Gaon)	1

=== Year-end charts ===
Year-end chart performance for Sherlock
Chart (2012)	Position
South Korea (Gaon)	5

== Release history ==
Release history and formats for Sherlock
Region	Date	Format	Label
Various	March 19, 2012	Digital download; streaming	SM Entertainment; KT Music
South Korea	March 21, 2012	CD	SM Entertainment; KT Music
