= Dazzling Girl =

- Regular edition CD cover

Single by Shinee

from the album Boys Meet U
- Language: Japanese
- B-side: "Run with Me"
- Released: October 3, 2012 (digital single); October 10, 2012 (physical album)
- Recorded: 2012
- Studio: In Grid (Seoul)
- Genre: J-pop
- Length: 3:32
- Label: EMI
- Composers: Drew Ryan Scott; Robert Allen; Justin Trugman; Jaako Manninen; Walter Afanasieff; Rx
- Lyricists: Sara Sakurai; Rx
- Producers: Speedball (Justin Trugman & Jaakko Manninen); Mr. Fantastic

Shinee Japanese singles chronology
"Sherlock" (2012)	"Dazzling Girl" (2012)	"1000nen, Zutto Soba ni Ite..." (2012)

Music video
- "Dazzling Girl" on YouTube

"Dazzling Girl" is the fifth Japanese single of South Korean boy group, Shinee, released on October 10, 2012. This is their first original Japanese single after their previous singles having been remakes of their Korean singles. Shinee ranked as the top-selling Korean artist in Japan for October with "Dazzling Girl". Selling over 109,032 copies in a month, "Dazzling Girl" was certified gold by the Recording Industry Association of Japan (RIAJ) for shipments of over 100,000.

== Background and release ==
On October 3, 2012, EMI released "Dazzling Girl" through iTunes Japan. On November 12, 2012, according to the Recording Industry Association of Japan (RIAJ), "Dazzling Girl" was certified Gold for shipped more than 100,000 albums and placed second on the Oricon Weekly Chart.

== Promotion ==
A preview of "Dazzling Girl" was released in a commercial for Jewelry Maki on August 24, 2012. The song was selected to be the theme song of Japanese television show Sukkiri!! and it began to air with this theme song starting from October 1 for a month.

On October 12, 2012, Shinee performed "Dazzling Girl" for the first time live on the Japanese music show Happy Music. Shinee continued to make appearances at Happy Music for 4 consecutive weeks as guests' comments. They also performed at Hey! Hey! Hey! Music Champ on October 21, 2012, and at Music Japan on October 28, 2012.

== Music video ==
The music video was directed by Hideaki Sunaga. It features the members of Shinee as photographers, stylists, and make-up artists as they prepare a model (played by Natsuki Fujimoto) for a photo shoot.

== Track listing ==
Limited editions and CD only regular edition:
No.	Title	Lyrics	Music	Length
1.	"Dazzling Girl"	Sara Sakurai, Rx	Drew Ryan Scott, Rob. A!, Justin Trugman, Jaakko Manninen, Walter Afanasieff, Rx	3:32
2.	"Run With Me"	Kanata Okajima	Peter Habib, Adam Nierow, Erika Nuri	3:12
Total length:				06:45

CD only regular edition:
No.	Title	Length
3.	"Dazzling Girl" (Instrumental)	3:32
4.	"Run With Me" (Instrumental)	3:12

Limited Edition Type B:
No.	Title	Length
3.	"Bodyguard" (Rearranged, Japanese version)	3:15

DVD (Limited Edition Type A)
No.	Title	Length
1.	"Dazzling Girl Music Video"	4:12
2.	"Dazzling Girl Jacket & Music Video Shooting Sketch"	15:32

== Chart performance ==
=== Oricon Chart ===
Oricon Chart	Peak	Debut Sales	Sales Total	Chart Run
Daily Singles Chart	2	55,543	110,548+	7 weeks
Weekly Singles Chart	2	97,111	110,548+	7 weeks
Monthly Singles Chart	4	109,032	110,548+	7 weeks
Yearly Singles Chart	71	110,230	110,548+	7 weeks

=== Other charts ===
Country	Chart	Peak position
Japan	Billboard Japan Adult Contemporary Airplay	28
Japan	Billboard Japan Hot Top Airplay	8
Japan	Billboard Japan Hot Singles Sales	2
Japan	Billboard Japan Hot 100	2
Taiwan	G-Music Asia Chart	1
Taiwan	G-Music Combo Chart	10

== Certifications ==
Region	Certification	Certified units/sales
Japan (RIAJ)	Gold	100,000^{^}
^{^} Shipments figures based on certification alone.

== Release history ==
Country	Date	Format	Label
Japan	October 10, 2012	CD, Digital download	EMI Music Japan
South Korea	June 12, 2013	Digital download	SM Entertainment
