= Tony Testa =

American choreographer

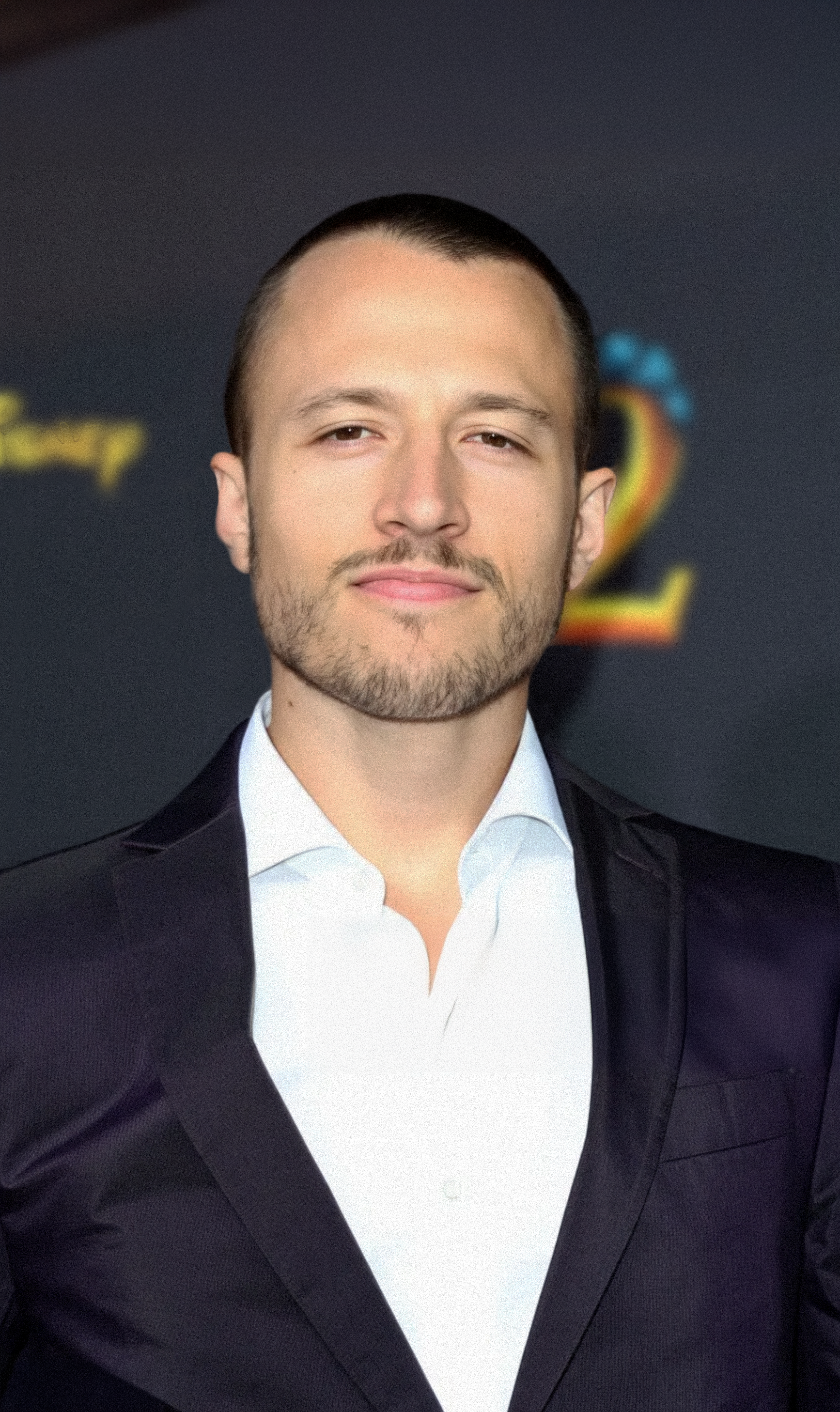
- Born: Anthony Joseph Testa; 31 March 1987 (age 39); Fort Collins, Colorado, U.S.
- Occupations: Choreographer, Filmmaker, Photographer, Mixed-media Artist
- Years active: 2005–present
- Spouse: Stefania Spampinato (m. 2018; div. 2020)
- Website: www.tonytestaofficial.com

Tony Testa (born 31 March 1987) is an American choreographer, film-maker, photographer, educator and performer.

== Early life ==
Testa started dancing at age eight in his hometown of Fort Collins, Colorado at Westin Arts Academy & Artistic Fusion Dance Academy. His career as a choreographer began at 16 years old when he made a demo reel using his mother's video camera. The reel was seen by Janet Jackson, who hired him to be a choreographer for her promotional tour shortly after.

== Career ==
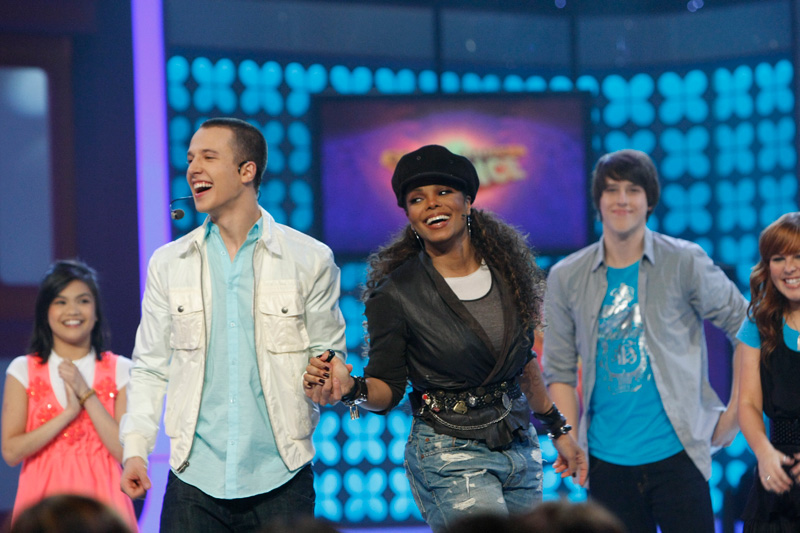
Testa with Janet Jackson in 2008

After moving to LA in 2005, Testa choreographed for Britney Spears, Jennifer Lopez, Versace, Ariana Grande, Demi Lovato, The Grammy's, and over 20 K-pop projects for SM Entertainment. He was hired by director and mentor Kenny Ortega as an associate choreographer for Michael Jackson's final tour, This Is It, and co-choreographer for Dancing With The Stars, The Rocky Horror Picture Show, and Descendants 2.

In 2010, he choreographed Kylie Minogue in "All The Lovers", "Better Than Today" and "Get Outta My Way" music videos, and in 2011 was the associate director and choreographer for her Aphrodite: Les Folies Tour. In November of that same year, Testa co-directed the opening of the American Music Awards with Wade Robson, and served as the Creative Director for both Season 1 of The Voice UK and for One Direction on Saturday Night Live (Season 37, Episode 18).

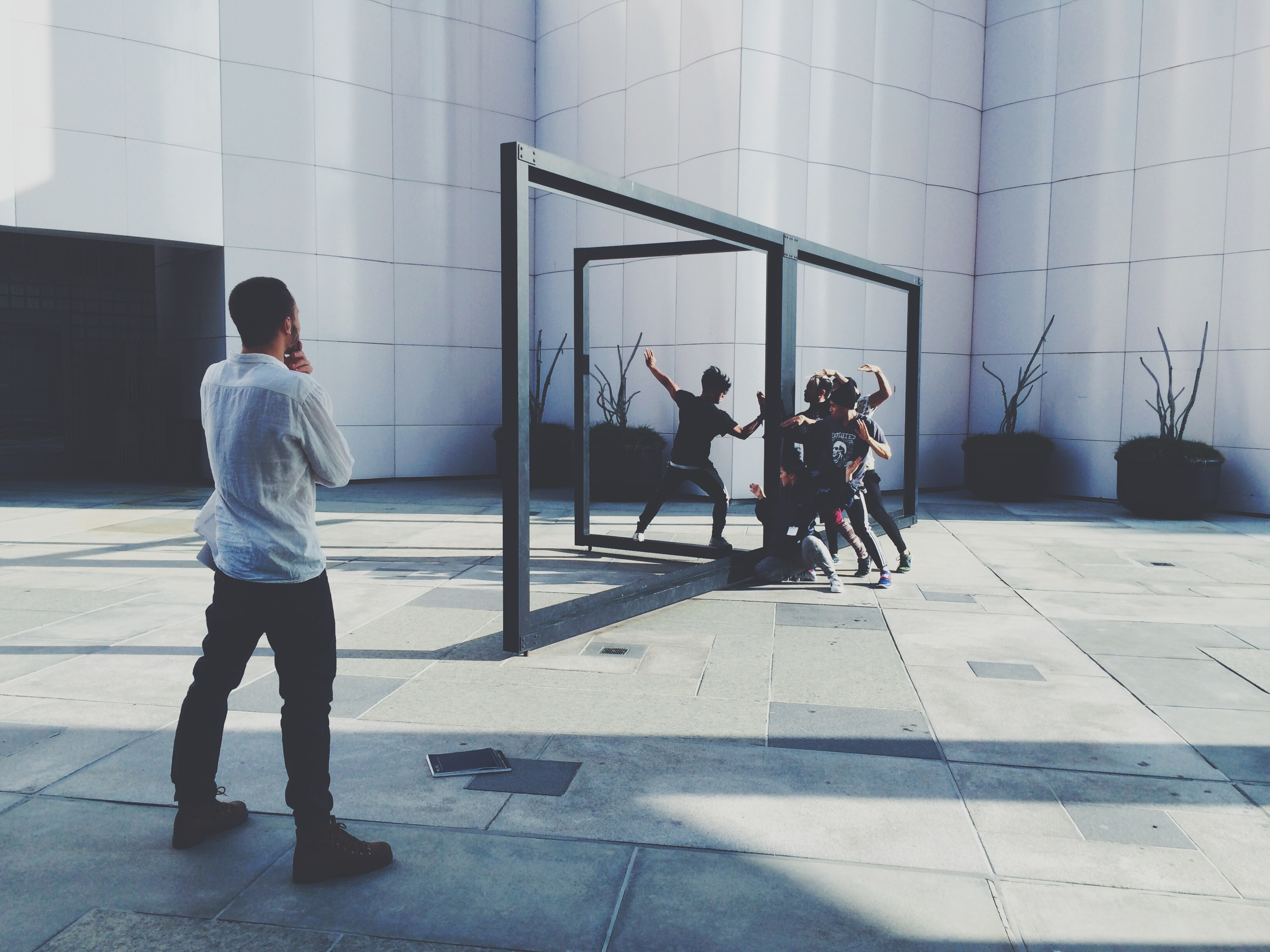
Testa rehearsing at LACMA (2015)

His choreographies have been featured at the LACMA alongside Noah Purifoy's "Junk Data", and in shows directed by Franco Dragone. In 2021, he was on the cover of GASP ZINE: issue 10 "The People's Issue", and his photography was shown at both GASP GALLERY and in Vanity Fair Magazine (Italy).

Testa is also a dance educator for the New York City Dance Alliance and Monsters Dance conventions.

== Collaborative Films ==
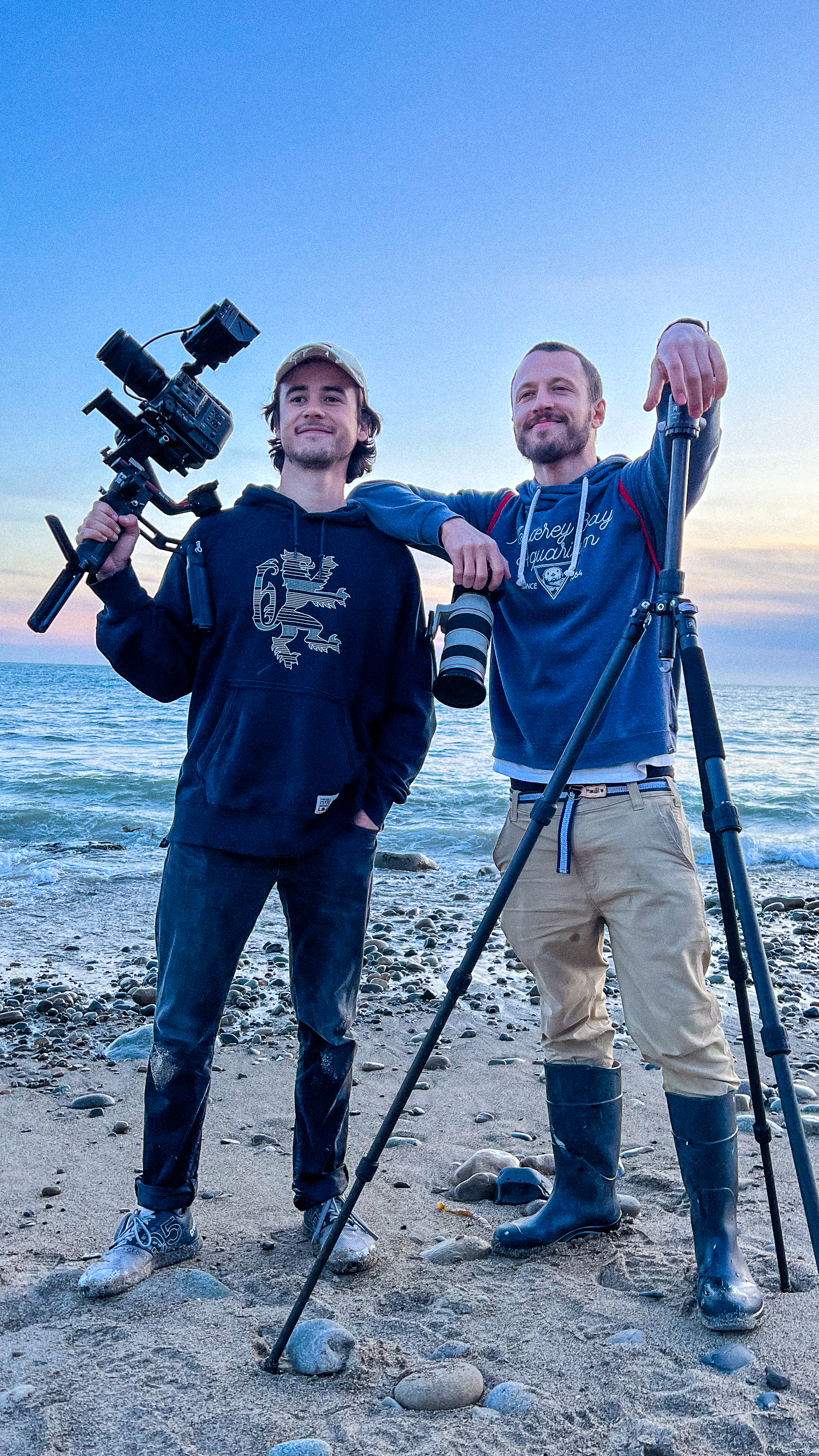
On set for ORIGIN with Johnson (2023)

DisInteGrated (2021)

In 2021, Testa & long time collaborator, Wade Robson, co-created an experimental short film featuring choreography performed by Testa. After its premiere on films.dance "DisInteGrated" was an official selection for 6 film festivals including Hollyshorts where it screened at the world famous Grauman's Chinese Theater. With an original musical score by the British jazz singer, Zara McFarlane, DisInteGrated won best experimental film at the Los Angeles Movie Awards & was featured on Nowness.

In 2023 Testa and Keean Johnson, co-directed "Origin" starring Popin' Pete and Robert Green. The film was shot mainly underwater, where Testa called upon his freediving experience to make the picture. The performers trained for several days in a scuba diving training facility to prepare for shooting. Origin premiered live at the Monsters Dance finale in a warehouse in Brooklyn, NY (2023) & was an official selection for the BronzeLens Film Festival in Atlanta, GA.

== B1: Movement Through Images ==
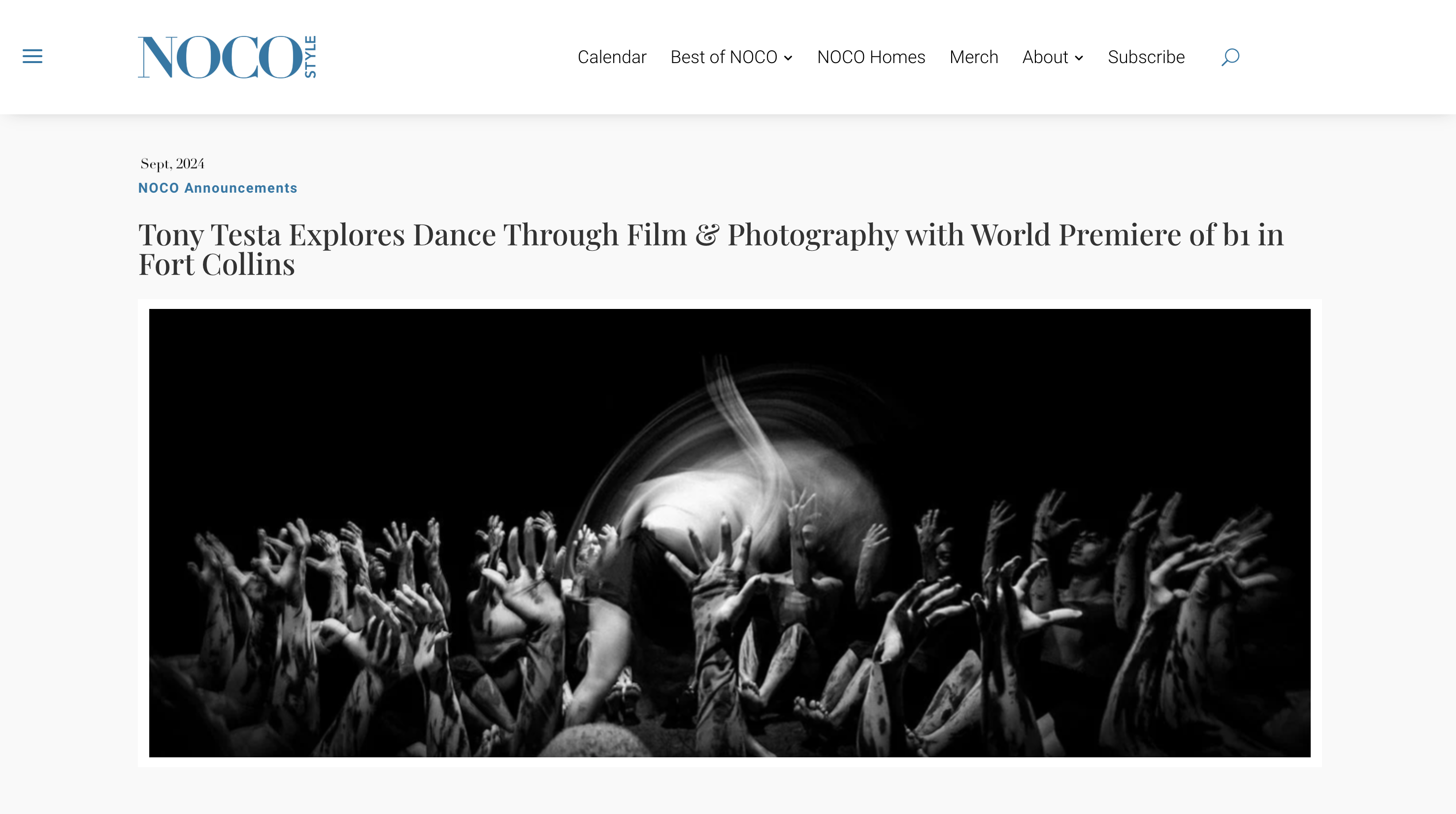
b1 premiere in Fort Collins, CO (2024)

After apprenticing with Greek Theater Director, Dimitris Papaioannou, Testa's focused shifted away from commercial projects and towards creating original works. He converted his garage into a blackbox theatre and began prioritizing choreographic experiments with a camera.

In 2022 he assembled a group of 22 performers and created a deeply ambitious film & photographic series which premiered at a horse barn/hunting lodge in his hometown of Fort Collins, CO.

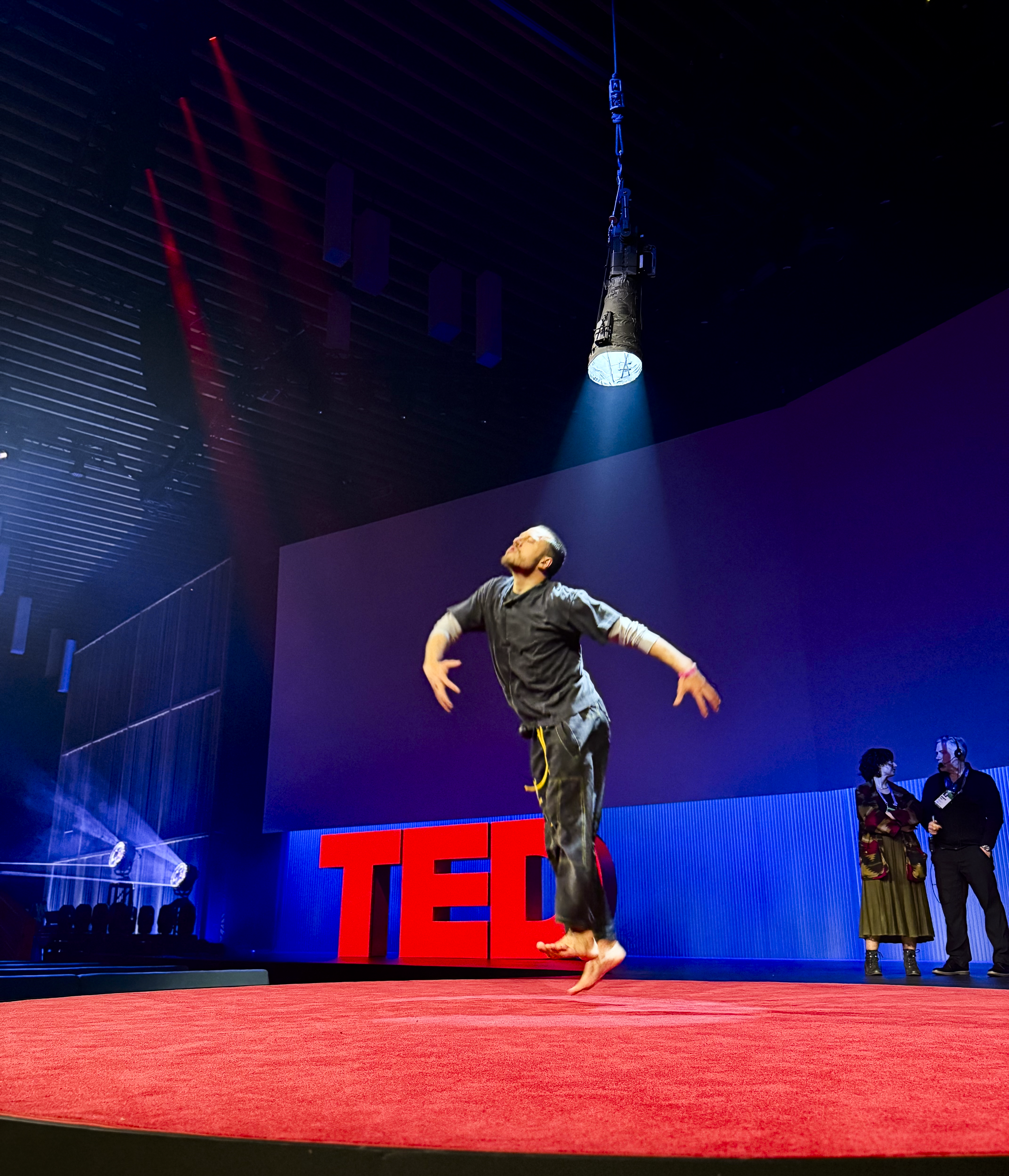
Testa rehearsing B1 "Human Remains" at TED 2025 in Vancouver, BC

“Human movement connects individuality to the power of the whole at every phase: in the studio, in the camera, in the performance space and in our collective awareness”, Testa says.

B1 was met with universal praise by ArtsMeme, & LA Dance Chronicle. "His use of props and technology was incredibly inventive and meshed well with his choreography, which combined tap, contemporary, hip-hop and, surprisingly, boxing. The piece felt cinematic and visceral, packed with energy", said Steven Vargas for the LA Times. His solo performances of "Human Remains", an excerpt of the B1 film, were performed live by Testa at Congress viii in Los Angeles, & at the TED 2025 flagship conference in British Columbia.

B1: Movement Through Images has since exhibited in Burbank, CA, Phoenix, AZ, & Vancouver, B.C.
