= List of songs recorded by Shinee =

Here is a list of the songs recorded in studio (not covers or live versions), that were released by the South Korean contemporary R&B quintet idol boy group Shinee. The group is known for having released over 100 songs under the record labels of SM Entertainment and EMI Records.

== Songs ==
Key
†	Indicates single release

Name of song, writers, originating album, and year released
Song	Writer(s)	Album	Year	Ref.
"1 of 1" †	JQ, Jo Mi-yang, Bae Seong-hyeon, Lee Seu-ran, Kim In-hyung, Park Seong-hee, Mike Daley, Mitchell Owens, Michael Jiminez, Tay Jasper, MZMC	1 of 1	2016	
"1 of 1" (Japanese version)	Sara Sakurai, Mike Daley, Mitchell Owens, Michael Jiminez, Tay Jasper, MZMC	Five	2017	
"3 2 1" †	Natsumi Kobayashi, Carlos Pena, Jr., Damon Sharpe, Eric Sanicola, James Maslow, Kendall Schmidt	I'm Your Boy	2013	
"10x"	Lee Hyung-seok, Andreas Öberg, Ninos Hanna, Felix Back, Rico Greene	Hard	2023	
"365"	AKIRA, Jimmy Burney, Andreas Öberg, Eirik Johansen, Jan Hallvard Larsen	I'm Your Boy	2014	
"1000nen, Zutto Soba ni Ite..." †	Junji Ishiwatari, Jimmy Richard, Steven Lee, The Goldfingerz	Boys Meet U	2012	
"A-Yo"	Ha Jung-hyeon, Denzil Remedios "DR", Erin Reid, Kibwe Luke "12Keyz"	Lucifer	2010	
"ABOAB"	Sara Sakurai, Chris Meyer, Stephan Elfgren	Five	2017	
"Alarm Clock"	Choi Minho, Kim Jonghyun, Niara Arain Scarlett, Philippe-Marc Anquetil, Christopher Lee-Joe, Iain James	Sherlock	2012	
"Alive"	Kim Eana, MC Meta, The Underdogs, Darius Logan & Dominique Logan	Odd	2015	
"All Day All Night"	Kenzie, Delly Boi, Davey Nate, Peter Tambakis	The Story of Light EP.1	2018	
"Always Love"	Natsumi Kobayashi, Denzil Remedios "DR", Kibwe Luke "12Keyz", Ryan Jhun	The First	2011	
"Amigo" †	Yoo Young-jin, Gabe Lopez, Jimmy Andrew Richard, Michael Edward Snyder, Sean Alexander	Amigo	2008	
"Amigo" (Japanese version)	Shoko Fyhubayashi, Gabe Lopez, Jimmy Andrew Richard, Michael Edward Snyder, Sean Alexander	The First	2011	
"An Encore" (재연)	Kim Jin-hwan	Odd	2015	
"An Ode To You" (너의 노래가 되어)	Kim Hyun-woo (Clef Crew), Kim Du-hyeong (Clef Crew)	Odd	2015	
"Anti Believer"	Park Tae-won, Elias Edman, Noak Hellsing, Cazzi Opeia, Ellen Berg, Henrik Heaven	Atmos	2026	
"Area" (같은 자리)	Minho, JQ, Cha Yu-bin, Lee Yeon-ji, Peter Wallevik, Daniel Davidsen, Sam Merrifield, James Yami Bell	Atlantis	2021	
"Aside"	Choi Minho, Hwang Hyun	Dream Girl – The Misconceptions of You	2013	
"Atlantis" †	Hwang Yu-bin, Changmo, Matt Thomson, Max Graham, James F. Reynolds, Gabriel Brandes, Britt Pols, Engelina Andrina Tekst, Yoo Young-jin	Atlantis	2021	
"Atmos" †	Eldon, Andrew Choi, Kenzie, Rouno	Atmos	2026	
"Attention"	Moon Seol-ri, Andy Love, Cage, Ninos Hanna, Rasmus Palmgren	Don't Call Me	2021	
"Beautiful"	Cha Yong-un, Choi Minho, Andrew Choi, Cha Yong-un, DOM, Richard Garcia, Teddy Riley	Dream Girl – The Misconceptions of You	2013	
"Beautiful Life" (한마디)	Onew, Simon Petrén, Andreas Öberg, Jonah Nilsson	1 and 1	2016	
"Become Undone"	Sara Sakurai, Santiago Rodriguez, Nait Masuku, Dan Leary, Martin Wiik	Five	2017	
"Best Place" (내 곁에만 있어)	Park Hae-hyung, Suk Hong	The Shinee World	2008	
"Better"	Sara Sakurai, Drew Ryan Scott, Sean Alexander, Steven Lee	The First	2011	
"Better Off" (버리고 가)	Kim Jonghyun, Bardur Haberg, Jenson David Aubrey Vaughan	The Misconceptions of Us	2013	
"Black Hole"	Kim Min-jeong, Albi Albertsson, Andreas Öberg, Andreas Carlsson	Odd	2015	
"Body Rhythm"	Shin Jin-hye, Woodie Gochild, Sebastian Thott, Didrik Thott, Ylva Dimberg	Don't Call Me	2021	
"Bodyguard" (보디가드)	Lee Jae-myung	Non-album release	2009	
"Bounce"	Amon Hayashi, Erik Lidbom	I'm Your Boy	2014	
"Boys Meet U" †	Ian Kirkpatrick, Lindy Robbins, Matt Squire, Sara Sakurai	I'm Your Boy	2013	
"Boys Will be Boys"	Kanata Okajima, Erik Lidbom	DxDxD	2016	
"Breaking News"	Agehasprings, Hidenori Tanaka, Andreas Oberg, Drew Ryan Scott, Steven Lee	Boys Meet U	2013	
"Burning Up!"	Sara Sakurai, Greig Watts, Jorge Mhondera, Paul Drew, Pete Barringer, Steven Lee	Boys Meet U	2013	
"Chemistry"	Cho Yoon-kyung, Minho, Andrew Choi, Deez, Yunsu	The Story of Light EP.2	2018	
"Chocolate"	Kim Jonghyun, Yankie, Andreas Oberg, Simon Janlöv	Married to the Music	2015	
"Close the Door" (닫아줘)	Jinbo	Everybody	2013	
"Closer"	Junji Ishiwatari, Richy Sebastian, Antoni Polimeni	Superstar	2021	
"Clue"	Jo Yoon-gyung, Thomas Eriksen, Thomas Troelsen	Sherlock	2012	
"Code"	Kenzie, Moonshine, Adrian McKinnon	Don't Call Me	2021	
"Colorful"	Jeon Gandi, Anders Wigelius, Stephan Elfgren	Everybody	2013	
"Colors of the Season"	Sara Sakurai, Andreas Stone Johansson, Caroline Gustavsson, Takarot	I'm Your Boy	2013	
"Countdown"	Eun Jong-tae, Oh Jun-seong	Dream OST	2009	
"Countless" (셀 수 없는) †	Jeon Gandi, Yoo Young-jin, Sara Forsberg, Adrian McKinnon, Jamil ‘Digi’ Chammas, Tay Jasper, Leven Kali, MZMC	The Story of Light Epilogue	2018	
"Dangerous (Medusa II)"	Jo Yun-kyeong, Kim Jonghyun, Andrew Choi, Kim Tae-seong, Red Rocket, Teddy Riley	Why So Serious? – The Misconceptions of Me	2013	
"Days and Years"	Seo Ji-eum, Colde, Tom Meredith, Nicole Morier, Benjamin Ingrosso	Atlantis	2021	
"Dazzling Girl" †	Sara Sakurai, Rx, Drew Ryan Scott, Jaakko Manninen "DJ Control", Justin Trugman, Rob. A!, Walter Afanasieff	Boys Meet U	2012	
"Destination"	Kim Minjung, Anne Judith Wik, Erik Lidbom, Herbie Crichlow, Jean Beauvoir, Michelle Andrea Escoffery	Everybody	2013	
"Diamond Sky"	Junji Ishiwatari, Steven Lee, Magnus Funemyr	Five	2017	
"Do Me Right"	Sara Sakurai, Janne Hyöty, Figge Boström, Takayuki Kojima (Takarot)	Five	2017	
"Don't Call Me" †	Kenzie, Dem Jointz, Rodnae "Chikk" Bell	Don't Call Me	2021	
"Don't Call Me" (Japanese version)	Junji Ishiwatari, Kenzie, Dem Jointz, Rodnae "Chikk" Bell	Superstar	2021	
"Don't Let Me Go" (투명 우산)	Jo Yun Gyeong, Minho, Key, Hyuk Shin, RE:ONE, Davey Nate, Peter Tambakis	1 of 1	2016	
"Don't Stop"	Jonghyun, Minho, Key, The Stereotypes, Micah Powell, Maxx Song	1 of 1	2016	
"Downtown Baby"	Junji Ishiwatari, Andreas Öberg, Drew Ryan Scott, Steven Lee	I'm Your Boy	2014	
"Dream Girl" †	Choi Minho, Jun Gan-di, Dave Cook, DK, Hyuk Shin, Jordan Kyle, Ross Lara	Dream Girl – The Misconceptions of You	2013	
"Dream Girl" (Japanese version)	agehasprings, Hidenori Tanaka, Dave Cook, DK, Hyuk Shin, Jordan Kyle, Ross Lara	I'm Your Boy	2014	
"Drive"	Goo Tae-woo, Gannin Arnold, Andy Delos Santos	The Story of Light EP.2	2018	
"Dynamite"	Choi Minho, Kim Bu-min, Hitchhiker	Dream Girl – The Misconceptions of You	2013	
"D×D×D"	Hidenori Tanaka(agehasprings), Kevin Charge, Ricky Hanley, Yumiko Okada, Hide Nakamura	D×D×D	2016	
"Electric"	Hwang Yubin, G'harah 'PK' Degeddingseze, Matt Wong, Jamie Jones, Hannah Asres, Victor Portillo, Jarah Gibson	The Story of Light EP.2	2018	
"Electric Heart"	Kim Bu-min, Hitchhiker	Lucifer	2010	
"Every Time"	MEG.ME, Josef Melin, Chris Meyer	Shinee The Best From Now On	2018	
"Everybody" †	Cho Yoonkyung, Coach & Sendo, Thomas Troelsen, Yoo Young-jin	Everybody	2013	
"Everybody" (Japanese version)	Sara Sakurai, Coach & Sendo, Thomas Troelsen, Yoo Young-jin	I'm Your Boy	2014	
"Evil"	Frederik Tao Nordsoe Schjoldan, Fridolin Nordsoe Schjoldan, Kenzie	Why So Serious? – The Misconceptions of Me	2013	
"Excuse Me Miss"	Choi Minho, Kim Bo-min, Amanshia Nunoo, Dwayne Fyne, Ryan Jhun	Why So Serious? – The Misconceptions of Me	2013	
"Farewell My Love" (이별의 길)	1월 8일 (Jam Factory), Steven Lee, Jimmy Richard, G'harah "PK" Degeddingseze	Odd	2015	
"Feel Good"	Lee Seu-ran, Timothy Bullock, Adrian McKinnon, Tay Jasper, MZMC	1 of 1	2016	
"The Feeling"	Jo Yoon-kyung, Hayden Chapman, Greg Bonnick, Adrian McKinnon	Hard	2023	
"Fire" †	Junji Ishiwatari, Akiko Shikata, Bach Logic, Erik Lidbom	Boys Meet U	2013	
"Fly High"	Eun Jong-tae, Oh Jun-seong	Prosecutor Princess OST	2010	
"Forever Or Never"	Lim Seo-hyun, Remee, Thomas Troelsen	Amigo	2008	
"Four Seasons" (눈을 감아보면)	Jang Yeon-jung, Kim Tae-sung, Martin Kember	The Shinee World	2008	
"From Now On" †	Nozomu Tsuchiya, Junji Ishiwatari, Andreas Stone Johansson, Costa Leon, Jakob Mihoubi, Rudi Daouk	Shinee The Best From Now On	2018	
"Gentleman"	Junji Ishiwatari, Andreas Öberg, Ninos Hanna, Saaed Molavi, Nadir Benkhala	Five	2017	
"Get Down" (Key and Minho feat. Luna from f(x))	Antwann Frost, Big Tone, Key, JQ, Minho, Script Shepherd, Ryan Jhun, Charley Paige, Solomon Cortes	2009, Year of Us	2009	
"Get It"	Ceejay, Choi Minho, Gilme, Key, Denzil Remedios "DR", Honor Roll, Kibwe Luke "12keyz", Ryan Jhun	Hello	2010	
"Get the Treasure"	Natsumi Kobayashi, Jeff Miyahara, Ilanguaq Lumholt, Joe J. Lee (Kairos), Darren Smith, Marcus Winther-John	Five	2017	
"Girls, Girls, Girls"	Choi Minho, Jun Gan-di, Key, Lucas Secon, Mikkel Remee Sigvardt, Thomas Troelsen	Dream Girl – The Misconceptions of You	2013	
"Good Evening" (데리러 가) †	Jo Yoon-kyung, Minho, Key, Chaz Mishan, David Delazyn, Bryan Jackson, Arnold Hennings, Daron Jones, Michael Keith, Quinnes Parker, Marvin Scandrick, Courtney Sills, Yoo Young-jin	The Story of Light EP.1	2018	
"Good Evening" (Japanese version)	Jo Yoon-kyung, Minho, Key, Sara Sakurai, Chaz Mishan, David Delazyn, Bryan Jackson, Arnold Hennings, Daron Jones, Michael Keith, Quinnes Parker, Marvin Scandrick, Courtney Sills, Yoo Young-jin	Sunny Side	2018	
"Good Good Feeling"	Sara Sakurai, Chris Meyer, Kevin Charge	DxDxD	2016	
"Gravity"	Choi Ji-yoon, Ludwig Lindell, Distract, Junny, Aisle	Hard	2023	
"Graze" (화장을 하고)	Kim Jung-bae, Kenzie	The Shinee World	2008	
"Green Rain" (초록비)	Kenzie	The Queen's Classroom OST	2013	
"Hard" †	Kenzie, Andrew Choi, No2zcat	Hard	2023	
"Haru" (하루) "Haru" (하루) (Rock version)	Oh Jun-seong	Haru OST	2010	
"Haru" (하루) (X-Mas Version) (feat. Oh Jun-Seong)	Oh Jun-seong	Non-album release	2010	
"Heart Attack"	Kenzie, Andrew Choi, minGtion, Dvwn	Don't Call Me	2021	
"Hello" †	Kim Eana, Jess Cates, Lars Halvor Jensen, Tim McEwan	Hello	2010	
"Hello" (Japanese version)	Natsumi Kobayashi, Jess Cates, Lars Halvor Jensen, Tim McEwan	The First	2011	
"Hit Me"	Kim Young-hu, Carol Borjaf	Romeo	2009	
"Hitchhiking"	Kim Bu-min, Anne Judith Wik, Hitchhiker, Will Simms	Dream Girl – The Misconceptions of You	2013	
"Hold You"	Kim Dong-hyun, The Stereotypes, Deez, Bumzu	Married to the Music	2016	
"Honesty"	Choi Minho, Kim Jonghyun, Brandon Fraley	Sherlock	2012	
"Hours"	Kenzie, Hayden Chapman, Greg Bonnick, Adrian McKinnon	Atmos	2026	
"I Really Want You"	Coogie, Jeong Ha-ri, Lee Yi-jin, Ed Drewett, Aston Merrygold, James Birt, George Tizzard, Rick Parkhouse, Ryan S. Jhun	Don't Call Me	2021	
"I Say"	Blue Bus, Gaho, Lee Ji-eun, Gu Seul-yoon	The Story of Light EP.3	2018	
"I Want You" †	Jeong Joo-hee (Jam Factory), Mike Woods, Kevin White, Andrew Bazzi, MZMC, 에스나 (eSNa), Tay Jasper, Yoo Young-jin	The Story of Light EP.2	2018	
"I Want You" (Japanese version)	Jeong Joo-hee (Jam Factory)), Sara Sakurai, Mike Woods, Kevin White, Andrew Bazzi, MZMC, Esna, Tay Jasper, Yoo Young-jin	Sunny Side	2018	
"I'm With You"	H.U.B, Drew Ryan Scott, Josef Salimi, Sammy Naja	Boys Meet U	2013	
"Identity"	Choi Ji-yoon, Jonathan Gusmark, Ludvig Evers, Emily Yeonseo Kim, Gabriel Brandes, Moa "Cazzi Opeia" Carlebecker	Hard	2023	
"If You Love Her"	Kim Eana, Coach & Sendo, Matthew Tishler, Felicia Barton	1 and 1	2016	
"In My Room"	Kim Young-hu, David Kater, Kim Tae-sung	Replay	2008	
"In My Room" (Unplugged mix)	Kim Young-hu, David Kater, Kim Tae-sung	The Shinee World	2008	
"Insomnia" (불면증)	Kim In-hyung, Josh Cumbee, JT Roach, Rollo	Hard	2023	
"JoJo"	Kenzie	2009, Year of Us	2009	
"Juice"	Kenzie, Dwayne "Dem Jointz" Abernathy Jr., Adrian McKinnon	Hard	2023	
"Juliette" †	Choi Minho, Kim Jonghyun, Jay Sean, Joseph Belmatti, Mich Hansen, Remee	Romeo	2009	
"Juliette" (Japanese version) †	Kim Jonghyun, Natsumi Kobayashi, Jay Sean, Joseph Belmatti, Mich Hansen, Remee	The First	2011	
"Jump"	Hwang Yoo-bin, Curtis Richa, Adien Lewis, Charlie Brown, Jerome Williams	The Story of Light EP.1	2018	
"Keeping Love Again"	Sara Sakurai, Darren Martyn, Shikata	Boys Meet U	2012	
"Kimi ga Iru Sekai"	H.U.B, Dapo Torimiro, Jamie Houston	Boys Meet U	2012	
"Kimi no Seide" (君のせいで) †	Junji Ishiwatari, Chris Meyer, Funk Uchino, Toshiya Hosokawa	Five	2016	
"Kind" (빈칸)	Bong Eun-young, Steve Manovski, YK Koi, Rhys, Simon John Bradshaw	Don't Call Me	2021	
"Kiss Kiss Kiss"	Ryosuke "Dr.R" Sakai, Chris Meyer, Carl Utbult	"Juliette"	2011	
"Kiss Kiss"	Danke (LaLaLa Studio), Benjamin Roberts, Tido Nguyen, Stephan Lee Benson, Jeffrey Okyere-Twumasi	Don't Call Me	2021	
"Kiss Yo"	Sara Sakurai, Anders Wigelius, Erik Wigelius	Boys Meet U	2013	
"Last Gift"	The Lighthouse, David Kater, Kim Tae-sung	The Shinee World	2008	
"Life"	Kim Jung-bae, Kenzie	Lucifer	2010	
"Like a Fire"	Min Yeong-jae, Herbert St. Clair Crichlow, Thomas Troelsen	Why So Serious? – The Misconceptions of Me	2013	
"Like It"	12h51m, Ryan S. Jhun, Robin Stjernberg, Johan Lindbrandt, Daniel Shah, Jason Ok	Hard	2023	
"Lipstick"	Oh Min-ju, Minho, Harvey Mason Jr., Mike Daley, Britt Burton, Tiffany Fred, Dewain Whitmore Jr., Patrick "J. Que" Smith	1 of 1	2016	
"Lock You Down" (Special track)	Brian Kim, Jo Yoon-kyung, The Stereotypes, August Rigo	The Story of Light EP.3	2018	
"Lollipop" (f(x) feat. Shinee)	Antwann Frost, Brande Kelley, Hong Ji-yoo, Reefa, Ryan Jhun, Tysear	Pinocchio	2011	
"Love"	Sara Sakurai, Kenzie	DxDxD	2016	
"Love's Way"	Wheesung, Alex Cantrall	The Shinee World	2008	
"Love Like Oxygen" †	Kim Young-hu, Kwon Yun-jung, Lucas Secon, Remee, Thomas Troelsen	The Shinee World	2008	
"Love Like Oxygen" (Japanese version)	Kim Young-hu, Kwon Yun-jung, Natsumi Kobayashi, Lucas Secon, Remee, Thomas Troelsen	The First	2011	
"Love Pain"	Kim Tae-sung, Roh Tae-ryung	Lucifer	2010	
"Love Should Go On"	Lee Yun-jae	Replay	2008	
"Love Should Go On" (DJ Oneshot mix)	Lee Yun-jae	Amigo	2008	
"Love Sick"	Kenzie, The Underdogs, Mike Daley, Dewain Whitmore	Odd	2015	
"Love Still Goes On"	Lee Yun-jae, JQ, Rado	Lucifer	2010	
"Lucifer" †	Yoo Young-jin, Adam Kapit, Bebe Rexha, Ryan Jhun	Lucifer	2010	
"Lucifer" (Japanese version) †	STY, Yoo Young-jin, Adam Kapit, Bebe Rexha, Ryan Jhun, Yoo Young-jin	The First	2011	
"Lucky Star" †	Sara Sakurai, Albi Albertsson, Stephan Elfgren, Steven Lee	I'm Your Boy	2014	
"Married to the Music" †	Kim Min-jung, Kim Bu-min, LDN Noise, Zak Waters, Adrian McKinnon, Ryan S. Jhun	Married to the Music	2015	
"Married to the Music (Japanese version)	Sara Sakurai, LDN Noise, Zak Waters, Adrian McKinnon, Ryan S. Jhun	Shinee The Best From Now On	2018	
"Marry You"	Rick Bridges, Cameron Louis Warren	Don't Call Me	2021	
"Melody"	Amon Hayashi, Didrik Thott, Peter Boyes, Josef Melin	Five	2017	
"Moon Drop"	Sara Sakurai, Chris Meyer, Shunsuke Harada	DxDxD	2016	
"Moon River Waltz"	Junji Ishiwatari, Blair MacKichan, Luke Bingham	"Fire"	2013	
"Mr. Right Guy"	Hidenori Tanaka (agehasprings), Lasse Lindorff, Martin Larsson, Lemar Obika	Five	2017	
"The Name I Loved" (Onew feat. Kim Yeon-woo)	Lee Sung-soo	2009, Year of Us	2009	
"Nightmare"	Kim Bo-min, Hitchhiker	Why So Serious? – The Misconceptions of Me	2013	
"Note"	Jo Yoon-gyung, Rocky Morris, Rufio Sandilands, Thomas Troelsen	Sherlock	2012	
"Nothing To Lose"	Junji Ishiwatari, Kevin Charge, Peter Boyes, Chris Meyer	Five	2017	
"Obsession"	Choi Minho, Kim Jonghyun, Jimmy Burney, John Ho, Sean Alexander	Lucifer	2010	
"Odd Eye"	Kim Jonghyun, Jonathan Yip, Jeremy Reeves, Ray Romulus, Ray McCullough	Odd	2015	
"One"	Choi Minho, Park Sung-soo	Hello	2010	
"One For Me"	Wheesung, Alex Cantrall	The Shinee World	2008	
"One Minute Back"	Jeon Gandi, Andrew Jackson, Trinity Music (Fredrik Haggstam, Johan Gustafson, Sebastian Lundberg)	Everybody	2013	
"Orgel"	Choi Minho, Kim Jonghyun, Christoper Lee-Joe, Iain James, Mikko Paavola, Philipe-Marc Anquetil	Why So Serious? – The Misconceptions of Me	2013	
"Our Page" (네가 남겨둔 말) †	Shinee, Kenzie, Mike Woods, Kevin White, Andrew Bazzi, MZMC, Yoo Young-jin	The Story of Light EP.3	2018	
"Password"	Natsumi Kobayashi, Andreas Moe, Hiten Bharadia, Maria Marcus, Niclas Lundin	Boys Meet U	2013	
"Perfect 10"	S-KEY-A, Fission Music (Mike Previti, Steve Horner)	I'm Your Boy	2014	
"Photograph"	Junji Ishiwatari, Ricky Hanley, Rob Derbyshire	DxDxD	2016	
"Picasso"	Sara Sakurai, Andreas Stone Johannson, Denniz Jamm, Matt Wong, Steven Lee	I'm Your Boy	2014	
"Please, Don't Go" (Onew and Jonghyun)	Jungyup, Eco Bridge	Romeo	2009	
"Possibility"	Lee Seu-ran, Jinbyjin, Jop Pangemanan	Atmos	2026	
"Prism"	Kim Min-jung, Jamil "Digi" Chammas, Deez, Wilbart "Vedo" McCoy III, MZMC, Otha "Vakseen" Davis III, Jonghyun	1 of 1	2016	
"Punch Drunk Love"	Jun Gan-di, Herbert St. Clair Crichlow, Thomas Troelsen	Dream Girl – The Misconceptions of You	2013	
"Quasimodo"	Jo In-hyung, Michael Lee	Lucifer	2010	
"Queen of New York"	Kenzie, Andrew Choi, Kim Jungbae	Everybody	2013	
"Ready Or Not"	Misfit, Mikko Tamminen, Risto Asikainen, Will Simms	Lucifer	2010	
"Real"	Kim Jung-bae, Kenzie	Replay	2008	
"The Reason"	Kwak So-young, Shim Eun-ji	Sherlock	2012	
"Replay" †	Kim Young-hu, Jack Kugell, James Burney II, Jason Pennock, Ravaughn Nichelle Brown, Tchaka Diallo	Replay	2008	
"Replay" (Japanese version) †	HIRO, Jack Kugell, James Burney II, Jason Pennock, Ravaughn Nichelle Brown, Tchaka Diallo	The First	2011	
"Rescue"	Kenzie, Harvey Mason Jr., Michael Daley, Dewain Whitmore	1 and 1	2016	
"Retro"	Cho Yoon-kyung, Andreas Öberg, Simon Petrén, Gustav Karlström, Deez	The Story of Light EP.3	2018	
"Ring Ding Dong" †	Yoo Young-jin	2009, Year of Us	2009	
"Romance"	Kim In-hyeong (Jam Factory), Andreas Öberg, Maria Marcus, Gustav Karlstrom	Odd	2015	
"Romantic"	Yoo Young-jin	The Shinee World	2008	
"Romeo + Juliette"	Lee Sung-su, Chon Hong-sung	Romeo	2009	
"Runaway"	Kim Young-hoo, Dennis White, Jovan Rangel	Dream Girl – The Misconceptions of You	2013	
"Run With Me"	Kanata Okajima, Adam Nierow, Erika Nuri, Peter Habib	Boys Meet U	2012	
"Satellite"	Park Tae-won, Shari Short, Rollo, Josh Cumbee	Hard	2023	
"Savior"	Kenzie, Zak Waters, Alex De Leon	Married to the Music	2016	
"Scar"	Lee Jae-myung	09 Summer SM Town	2009	
"Seaside (Boom Boom)" (with TVXQ and Super Junior)	Anderz Wrethov, Johan Deltinger, Yun Hyo-sang	09 Summer SM Town	2009	
"Seasons"	Sara Sakurai, Kenzie, Adrian McKinnon	Superstar	2021	
"Seesaw"	Kanata Okajima, Chris James, Shaffer Smith "Ne-Yo"	The First	2011	
"Selene 6.23"	Kim Jonghyun, 2Face, Ted Kim, Yiruma	The Misconceptions of Us	2013	
"Señorita" (세뇨리따)	Kim Jung-bae, Kenzie	Romeo	2009	
"Sherlock (Clue + Note)" †	Jo Yoon-gyung, Rocky Morris, Rufio Sandilands, Thomas Eriksen, Thomas Troelsen	Sherlock	2012	
"Sherlock" (Japanese version) †	Natsumi Kobayashi, Rocky Morris, Rufio Sandilands, Thomas Eriksen, Thomas Troelsen	Boys Meet U	2013	
"Shift"	Kenzie, LDN Noise, Adrian McKinnon	1 of 1	2016	
"Shine (Medusa I)"	Misfit, Minho, Teddy Riley, Red Rocket, Kim Tae Seong, Andrew Choi	Why So Serious? – The Misconceptions of Me	2013	
"Shinee Girl"	Park Joon-ha	2009, Year of Us	2009	
"The Shinee World" (Japanese version)	Kanata Nakamura, Yoo Young-jin	The First	2011	
"The Shinee World (Doo-Bop)"	Yoo Young-jin	The Shinee World	2008	
"Shout Out" (악)	JQ, Shinee, Misfit, Steven Lee, Drew Ryan Scott, Sean Alexander	Lucifer	2010	
"Sing Your Song"	Junji Ishiwatari, Andreas Öberg, Carlos Okabe, Michael Lee Cheung (MLC)	DxDxD	2016	
"Sleepless Night"	Choi Minho, Shim Changmin, Im Kwang Ok, Matthew Tishler, Kim Yu-min	Why So Serious? – The Misconceptions of Me	2013	
"So Amazing"	Onew, Erik Lidbom, Takarot	1 of 1	2016	
"Spoiler"	Kim Jonghyun, Pegasus, Thomas Troelsen	Dream Girl – The Misconceptions of You	2013	
"Stand By Me"	Eun Jong-tae, Oh Jun-seong	Boys Over Flowers OST	2009	
"Start"	Sara Sakurai, Drew Ryan Scott, Josef Salimi, Sammy Naja	The First	2011	
"Still Raining" (소나기)	Jung Na-kyung, Fabian "Phat Fabe" Torsson, Harry Sommerdahl, August Rigo, Emily Yeonseo Kim	Atmos	2026	
"Stranger"	Choi Minho, Kim Jung-bae, Kenzie	Sherlock	2012	
"Stranger" (Japanese version)	Natsumi Kobayashi, Kenzie	The First	2011	
"Sunny Day Hero"	agehasprings, Hidenori Tanaka, Kim Bergseth, Tom Hugo Hermansen	I'm Your Boy	2013	
"Sunny Side" †	Shinee, Hanif Hitmanic Sabzevari, Erik Mjörnell, Lars Säfsund	Sunny Side	2018	
"Superstar" †	Amon Hayashi, LDN Noise, Lenno Linjama, Andrew Jackson, Iain James	Superstar	2021	
"Sweet Misery"	Cho Yoon-kyung, Kella Armitage, Decz, Grant Boutin, Francis Karel	Hard	2023	
"Sweet Surprise"	Junji Ishiwatari, Andreas Öberg, Andreas Stone Johansson, Steven Lee	DxDxD	2016	
"Symptoms"	Kim Jonghyun, The Underdogs	Everybody	2013	
"Talk To You"	Kim Tae-sung, Carol Borjaf	Romeo	2009	
"Tell Me What to Do" †	Yoo Young-jin, Kim Dong-hyun, Mike Daley, Mitchell Owens, Dewain Whitmore, Patrick "J. Que" Smith	1 and 1	2016	
"Tell Me Your Name"	Sara Sakurai, Jeremy Thurber, Tat Tong, Jovany Javier	Shinee The Best From Now On	2018	
"Thousand Miles Away"	Park Tae-won, Maria Marcus, MLC, Andrew Choi	Atmos	2026	
"To Your Heart"	Kanata Okajima, Erik Lidbom, Jon Hällgren	The First	2011	
"Tonight"	Cho Yoon-kyung, Minos, Hyuk Shin, MRey (Joombas), JJ Evans (Joombas), Jeff Lewis	The Story of Light EP.3	2018	
"Trigger"	Kenzie, Deez, Rodnae "Chikk" Bell	Odd	2015	
"U Need Me"	Agnes Shin, Minho, Andreas Öberg, Simon Petrén, Maja Keuc, Gustav Karlström	1 of 1	2016	
"Undercover"	Seo Ji-eum, Deez, Andrew Choi, Alexander Karlsson, Alexej Viktorovitch	The Story of Light EP.1	2018	
"Up & Down"	Kim Jonghyun, Misfit, wiidope	Lucifer	2010	
"View" †	Kim Jonghyun, LDN Noise, Ryan S. Jhun, Adrian McKinnon	Odd	2015	
"Wanted"	Sara Sakurai, Christian Fast, Didrik Thott, Henrik Nordenback	DxDxD	2016	
"Who Waits For Love" (독감)	Seo Ji-eum, 딥플로우 (Deepflow), Shin Hyuk, Ross Lara, Dave Cook, JJ Evans, Jeff Lewis	The Story of Light EP.2	2018	
"Why So Serious?" †	Kenzie, Andrew Choi, Kenzie, Kim Cheong Bae	Why So Serious? – The Misconceptions of Me	2013	
"Winter Wonderland" †	Hidenori Tanaka, Erik Lidbom, Takayuki Kojima (Takarot)	Five	2016	
"Wish Upon A Star" (별빛 바램)	Kim Jun-il, Harang, Kim Jae-hyun	1 and 1	2016	
"Wishful Thinking"	Koaru Kami, Andreas Öberg, Daniel Caesar, Ludwig Lindell (Caesar & Loui)	DxDxD	2016	
"Woof Woof"	Kim In-hyeong (Jam Factory), Will Simms, DWB	Odd	2015	
"Wowowow"	Choi Minho, Kim Jin-hee, Emma Stevens, Will Simms	Lucifer	2010	
"Y Si Fuera Ella"	Alejandro Sanz, Kenzie	The Shinee World	2008	
"Y.O.U (Year of Us)"	Kim Young-hu, Alex Cantrall, Don "Traxx Trigga" Sellers Jr.	2009, Year of Us	2009	
"You & I" (안녕)	Key, Choi Jin-seok, Ronny Svendsen, Anne Judith Stokke Wik, Nermin Harambasic, Moa Anna Carlebecker Forsell, Martin Mullholland	The Story of Light EP.1	2018	
"Your Name"	Choi Minho, Onew, Brandon Fraley	Lucifer	2010	
"Your Number" †	Junji Ishiwatari, Chris Meyer, Kevin Charge	D×D×D	2015	
