= Shinee discography =

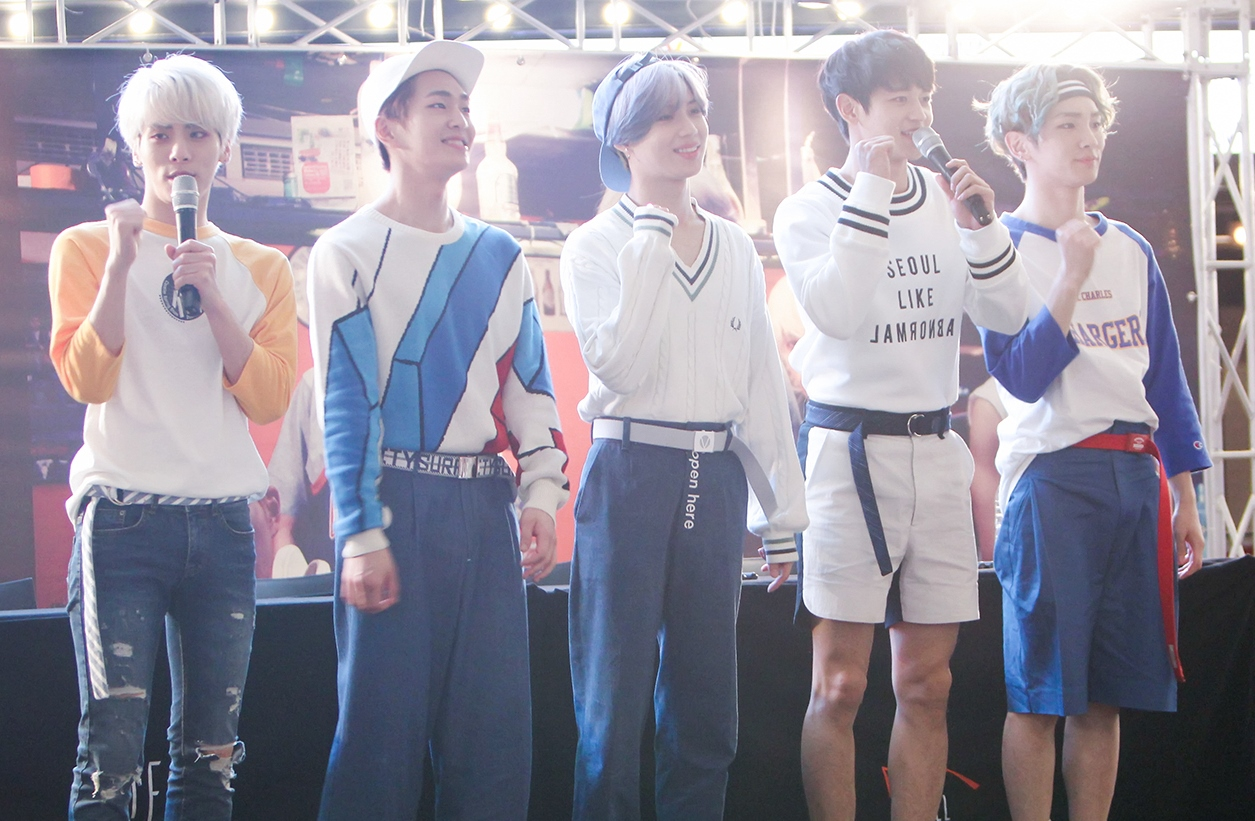
- Shinee in May 2015; From left to right: Jonghyun, Onew, Taemin, Minho, Key
- Studio albums: 13
- Extended plays: 6
- Soundtrack albums: 10
- Live albums: 4
- Compilation albums: 3
- Singles: 40
- Reissues: 5

South Korean boy group Shinee, produced and managed by SM Entertainment, have released thirteen studio albums (two of which were split releases), four live albums, six extended plays (EPs) and forty singles. They have also participated in singing ten soundtracks for various Korean dramas and have been a part of SM Town's winter vacation album 2011 Winter SMTown – The Warmest Gift and summer vacation album 2009 Summer SMTown – We Are Shining with other SM artists.

Shinee debuted in May 2008 with their first EP, Replay, which spawned the single of the same name. They later released their first studio album, The Shinee World, which peaked at number three on the MIAK (Music Industry Association of Korea) chart and was re-released as Amigo (2008). The album spawned two more singles: "Love Like Oxygen" and "Amigo". Shinee's second EP, Romeo, was released in 2009 and contained their fourth single, "Juliette". The release was soon followed by their third EP, 2009, Year of Us (2009), with the lead single "Ring Ding Dong". Their second studio album, Lucifer, was released in 2010 and peaked at number one on the Gaon Album Chart. It produced a Korean top ten single, "Lucifer". The 2010 reissue of the album, titled Hello, also charted at number one on the Gaon Album Chart and sold over 100,000 physical units in South Korea. It spawned the Gaon Digital Chart top 10 single "Hello", which sold over one million digital copies.

Shinee's fourth EP, Sherlock, was released in 2012. The lead single, "Sherlock (Clue + Note)", claimed the top spot on the Gaon Digital Chart and charted third on the Korea K-Pop Hot 100 chart. It became the group's highest-selling digital single in South Korea, with over 1.7 million digital downloads. In 2013, Shinee released two-part studio albums Dream Girl – The Misconceptions of You and Why So Serious? – The Misconceptions of Me, which were later re-released as The Misconceptions of Us (2013). The same year, the group released their fifth EP, Everybody, and another number one single, "Everybody". Shinee was one of the biggest-selling K-pop acts in America in 2013, becoming one of the first Korean musicians to rank on Billboard's year-end World Albums chart. In 2015, Shinee released their fourth studio album, Odd, with the lead single "View", both of which claimed the top of the charts. The album's reissue, Married to the Music, was released the same year with four additional songs. Subsequent albums included 1 of 1 (2016), The Story of Light (2018), Don't Call Me (2021) and Hard (2023). The latter two were both certified Platinum by the Korea Music Content Association (KMCA).

A Japanese version of "Replay", released as "Replay (Kimi wa Boku no Everything)", was Shinee's first Japanese-language release and peaked at number two on the Oricon Singles Chart. In the first week of sales, it sold over 91,000 copies, setting a new record for the debut single of a Korean idol group in Japan. They then released their first Japanese studio album, The First (2011). Their first original Japanese song, "Dazzling Girl", which was released as a double A-side single with another Japanese original song, "Run With Me", ranked at number two on the Oricon Charts and was certified Gold by RIAJ. The group released their second Japanese album, Boys Meet U, in 2013. This was followed by their third, fourth and fifth studio albums, I'm Your Boy (2014), D×D×D (2016) and Five (2017). In 2021, they released their first Japanese EP, Superstar.

== Albums ==
=== Korean studio albums ===
List of Korean studio albums, with selected chart positions, sales figures and certifications
Title	Details	Peak chart positions							Sales	Certifications
Title	Details	KOR (Note: Prior to the establishment of the Gaon Music Chart in 2010, South Korea's music charts were supplied by the Music Industry Association of Korea (MIAK), which stopped compiling data in 2008. There are no credible sales records for albums sold in 2009.)	JPN	JPN Hot	TW	UK Down.	US Heat.	US World	Sales	Certifications
The Shinee World	Released: August 28, 2008; Label: SM Entertainment; Formats: CD, digital download	— (Note: Music Industry Association of Korea (MIAK) compiled sales figures for music releases until 2008. The album The Shinee World, which was released in 2008, peaked at number three on the MIAK chart.)	—	—	11	—	—	—	KOR: 69,246	
Lucifer	Released: July 19, 2010; Label: SM Entertainment; Formats: CD, digital download	1	14	—	7	—	—	—	KOR: 150,710; JPN: 19,283; TW: 30,000	
The Misconceptions of Us	Dream Girl – The Misconceptions of You; Released: February 19, 2013; Label: SM Entertainment; Formats: CD, digital download	1	10	—	2	—	5	2	KOR: 184,719; JPN: 24,376	
The Misconceptions of Us	Why So Serious? – The Misconceptions of Me; Released: April 26, 2013; Label: SM Entertainment; Formats: CD, digital download	1	8	—	6	—	5	1	KOR: 147,551; JPN: 23,972	
Odd	Released: May 18, 2015; Label: SM Entertainment; Formats: CD, digital download	1	6	—	4	—	9	1	KOR: 193,412; JPN: 41,070; US: 2,000	
1 of 1	Released: October 5, 2016; Label: SM Entertainment; Formats: Cassette, CD, digital download	1	11	15	—	—	14	2	KOR: 179,027; JPN: 32,561	
The Story of Light	The Story of Light EP.1; Released: May 28, 2018; Label: SM Entertainment; Formats: CD, digital download	1	7	6	—	80	2	4	KOR: 116,152; JPN: 13,147; US: 2,000	
The Story of Light	The Story of Light EP.2; Released: June 11, 2018; Label: SM Entertainment; Formats: CD, digital download	1	8	6	—	—	5	4	KOR: 99,920; JPN: 12,218; US: 1,000	
The Story of Light	The Story of Light EP.3; Released: June 25, 2018; Label: SM Entertainment; Formats: CD, digital download	2	18	9	—	—	11	4	KOR: 98,757; JPN: 11,604	
Don't Call Me	Released: February 22, 2021; Label: SM Entertainment; Formats: CD, digital download	1	7	8	—	24	14	7	KOR: 313,309; JPN: 44,711	KMCA: Platinum
Hard	Released: June 26, 2023; Label: SM Entertainment; Formats: CD, digital download	2	5	3	—	54	—	—	KOR: 393,553; JPN: 24,785	KMCA: Platinum
"—" denotes releases that did not chart or were not released in that region.

=== Japanese studio albums ===
List of Japanese studio albums, with selected chart positions, sales figures and certifications
Title	Details	Peak chart positions				Sales	Certifications
Title	Details	KOR	JPN	JPN Hot	TW	Sales	Certifications
The First	Released: December 7, 2011; Label: EMI Music Japan; Formats: CD, digital download	3	4	—	4	JPN: 99,565; KOR: 8,254	RIAJ: Gold
Boys Meet U	Released: June 26, 2013; Label: EMI Records Japan, Universal Music Japan; Formats: CD, digital download	—	2	—	10	JPN: 69,010	RIAJ: Gold
I'm Your Boy	Released: September 24, 2014; Label: EMI Records, Universal Music Japan; Formats: CD, digital download	9	1	—	5	JPN: 61,357; KOR: 3,662	
D×D×D	Released: January 1, 2016; Label: EMI Records, Universal Music Japan; Formats: CD, digital download	—	1	3	2	JPN: 61,263	
Five	Released: January 27, 2017; Label: EMI Records, Universal Music Japan; Formats: CD, digital download	—	3	3	1	JPN: 78,634 (Phy.); JPN: 5,647 (Dig.)	
"—" denotes releases that did not chart or were not released in that region.

=== Reissues ===
List of reissues, with selected details, chart positions and sales
Title	Details	Peak chart positions				Sales
Title	Details	KOR	JPN	JPN Hot	US World	Sales
Amigo	Released: October 29, 2008; Label: SM Entertainment; Formats: CD, digital download	—	47	—	—	KOR: 23,017; JPN: 3,515
Hello	Released: October 4, 2010; Label: SM Entertainment; Formats: CD, digital download	1	—	—	—	KOR: 104,627; JPN: 4,148
Married to the Music	Released: August 3, 2015; Label: SM Entertainment; Formats: CD, digital download	1	—	—	5	KOR: 107,737
1 and 1	Released: November 15, 2016; Label: SM Entertainment; Formats: CD, digital download	1	—	—	—	KOR: 82,522
Atlantis	Released: April 12, 2021; Label: SM Entertainment; Formats: CD, digital download	2	—	7	—	KOR: 147,576
"—" denotes releases that did not chart or were not released in that region.

=== Compilation albums ===
List of compilation albums, with selected details, chart positions, sales, and certifications
Title	Details	Peak chart positions				Sales	Certifications
Title	Details	KOR	JPN	JPN Hot	US World	Sales	Certifications
The Misconceptions of Us	Released: August 8, 2013 (KOR); Label: SM Entertainment; Format: CD, digital download	4	17	—	—	KOR: 67,209; JPN: 6,844	
Shinee the Best from Now On	Released: April 18, 2018 (JPN); Label: EMI Records, Universal Music Japan; Formats: CD, digital download	—	1	1	—	JPN: 100,471	RIAJ: Gold
The Story of Light Epilogue	Released: September 10, 2018 (KOR); Label: SM Entertainment; Format: CD, digital download	1	8	19	9	KOR: 58,931; JPN: 9,801	
"—" denotes releases that did not chart or were not released in that region.

=== Live albums ===
List of live albums, with selected chart positions and notes
Title	Details	Peak chart positions		Sales
Title	Details	KOR	JPN	Sales
The 1st Concert Album "Shinee World"	Released: February 1, 2012; Label: SM Entertainment; Formats: CD, digital download	2	40	KOR: 34,115; JPN: 5,026
The 2nd Concert Album "Shinee World II"	Released: April 2, 2014; Label: SM Entertainment; Formats: CD, digital download	5	100	KOR: 9,726; JPN: 1,980
The 3rd Concert Album "Shinee World III"	Released: December 11, 2014; Label: SM Entertainment; Formats: CD, digital download	3	—	KOR: 15,635; JPN: 4,517
The 4th Concert Album "Shinee World IV"	Released: April 22, 2016; Label: SM Entertainment; Formats: CD, digital download	6	43	KOR: 12,000; JPN: 3,663
"—" denotes releases that did not chart or were not released in that region.

== Extended plays ==
List of extended plays, with selected chart positions and sales figures
Title	Details	Peak chart positions						Sales	Certifications
Title	Details	KOR	JPN	JPN Hot	TW	US Heat	US World	Sales	Certifications
Replay	Released: May 22, 2008 (KOR); Label: SM Entertainment; Formats: CD, digital download	— (Note: The Music Industry Association of Korea (MIAK) compiled sales figures for music releases until 2008. The EP Replay, which was released in 2008, peaked at number eight on the monthly MIAK chart for June 2008.)	—	—	17	—	—	KOR: 32,171	
Romeo	Released: May 25, 2009 (KOR); Label: SM Entertainment; Formats: CD, digital download	—	39	—	11	—	—	KOR: 29,589; JPN: 3,485	
2009, Year of Us	Released: October 19, 2009 (KOR); Label: SM Entertainment; Formats: CD, digital download	—	40	—	—	—	—	KOR: 40,865; JPN: 4,893	
Sherlock	Released: March 21, 2012 (KOR); Label: SM Entertainment; Formats: CD, digital download	1	13	—	3	10	5	KOR: 213,861; JPN: 23,680	
Everybody	Released: October 14, 2013 (KOR); Label: SM Entertainment; Formats: CD, digital download	1	7	—	7	20	2	KOR: 156,000; JPN: 22,365	
Superstar	Released: June 28, 2021 (JPN); Label: EMI Records, Universal Music Japan; Formats: CD, digital download	—	1	2	—	—	—	JPN: 78,265 (Phy.)	RIAJ: Gold
Atmos	Released: June 1, 2026 (KOR); Label: SM Entertainment; Formats: CD, digital download	5	7	28	—	—	—	KOR: 152,863; JPN: 18,284	
"—" denotes releases that did not chart or were not released in that region.

== Single albums ==
List of single albums, with selected chart positions and sales figures
Title	Details	Peak chart positions	Sales
Title	Details	KOR	Sales
Poet | Artist	Released: May 25, 2025; Label: SM Entertainment; Formats: CD, digital download	2	KOR: 309,641

== Singles ==
=== Korean singles ===
List of Korean singles as lead artist, with selected chart positions and sales, showing year released and album name
Title	Year	Peak chart positions				Sales (Note: Sales figures for Korean-language singles are digital, while sales figures for Japanese-language singles are physical, except where noted. Up until 2017, the number of downloads for songs on the Korean Gaon Digital Chart were visible to the public but starting January, 2018 these numbers are no more displayed. US sales are based on digital downloads.)	Album
Title	Year	KOR	KOR Hot (Note: Prior to the issue date of August 25, 2011, the K-Pop Hot 100 did not exist. Singles had previously charted exclusively on the Gaon Single Chart. It stopped charting in May 2014 and was relaunched in December 2017.; Chart positions for the Billboard K-Pop Hot 100 Chart beyond the first fifty are only viewable with a subscription on Billboard.com/biz.)	JPN Hot	US World	Sales	Album
"Replay" (누난 너무 예뻐)	2008	—	—	—	12	US: 22,000	Replay
"Love Like Oxygen" (산소 같은 너)	2008	—	—	—	—		The Shinee World
"Amigo" (아.미.고)	2008	—	—	—	—		Amigo
"Juliette" (줄리엣)	2009	—	—	—	—		Romeo
"Ring Ding Dong"	2009	85	—	—	16	US: 38,000	2009, Year of Us
"JoJo"	2009	29	—	—	—		2009, Year of Us
"Lucifer"	2010	2	—	—	3	KOR: 1,431,431; US: 67,000	Lucifer
"Hello"	2010	7	—	—	3	KOR: 1,005,756; US: 38,000	Hello
"Sherlock (Clue + Note)" (셜록)	2012	1	3	—	4	KOR: 1,720,124; US: 30,000	Sherlock
"Dream Girl"	2013	1	3	—	3	KOR: 942,747	Dream Girl – The Misconceptions of You
"Why So Serious?"	2013	15	16	—	6	KOR: 467,439	Why So Serious? – The Misconceptions of Me
"Everybody"	2013	1	15	—	3	KOR: 452,465	Everybody
"View"	2015	1	—	—	2	KOR: 724,659	Odd
"Married to the Music"	2015	8	—	—	5	KOR: 193,583	Married to the Music
"1 of 1"	2016	4	—	—	3	KOR: 235,410	1 of 1
"Tell Me What to Do"	2016	4	—	—	3	KOR: 130,428	1 and 1
"Good Evening" (데리러가)	2018	10	15	26	8		The Story of Light EP.1
"I Want You"	2018	20	9	47	10		The Story of Light EP.2
"Our Page" (네가 남겨둔 말)	2018	37	31	92	16		The Story of Light EP.3
"Countless" (셀 수 없는)	2018	74	—	76	4		The Story of Light Epilogue
"Don't Call Me"	2021	3	7	98	8		Don't Call Me
"Atlantis"	2021	11	34	—	3		Atlantis
"Hard"	2023	7	—	—	13		Hard
"Poet | Artist"	2025	124	—	—	5		Poet Artist
"Atmos"	2026	115	—	—	—		Atmos
"—" denotes releases that did not chart or were not released in that region.

=== Japanese singles ===
List of Japanese singles as lead artist, with selected chart positions and sales, showing year released and album name
Title	Year	Peak chart positions			Sales	Certifications	Album
Title	Year	KOR	JPN	JPN Hot	Sales	Certifications	Album
"Replay" (Replay -君は僕のeverything-)	2011	—	2	2	JPN: 114,314	RIAJ: Gold	The First
"Juliette"	2011	—	3	3	JPN: 73,736		The First
"Lucifer"	2011	—	2	4	JPN: 62,689		The First
"Sherlock"	2012	—	2	4	JPN: 69,316		Boys Meet U
"Dazzling Girl"	2012	—	2	2	JPN: 110,915	RIAJ: Gold	Boys Meet U
"1000nen, Zutto Soba ni Ite..." (1000年、ずっとそばにいて…)	2012	—	3	3	JPN: 47,637		Boys Meet U
"Fire"	2013	—	5	7	JPN: 54,928		Boys Meet U
"Boys Meet U"	2013	—	2	2	JPN: 124,729	RIAJ: Gold	I'm Your Boy
"3 2 1"	2013	161	3	2	JPN: 83,874		I'm Your Boy
"Lucky Star"	2014	—	3	2	JPN: 41,324		I'm Your Boy
"Your Number"	2015	—	2	3	JPN: 134,391	RIAJ: Gold	D×D×D
"Sing Your Song"	2015	—	5	5	JPN: 60,189		D×D×D
"Kimi no Seide" (君のせいで)	2016	—	2	4	JPN: 69,886		Five
"Winter Wonderland"	2016	—	2	3	JPN: 96,412	RIAJ: Gold	Five
"From Now On"	2018	—	—	14			Shinee the Best from Now On
"Sunny Side"	2018	—	4	5	JPN: 82,092	RIAJ: Gold	Non-album single
"Superstar"	2021	—	—	64			Superstar
"—" denotes releases that did not chart or were not released in that region.

== Soundtrack appearances ==
List of soundtrack appearances, with selected chart positions and certifications, showing year released and album name
Title	Year	Peak chart positions		Album
Title	Year	KOR	KOR Hot	Album
"Stand By Me"	2009	—	—	Boys Over Flowers OST Part 1
"Bodyguard"	2009	—	—	Digital single for Boys Over Flowers
"Countdown"	2009	—	—	Dream OST
"Fly High"	2010	38	—	Prosecutor Princess OST Part 1
"Haru" (하루)	2010	54	—	Haru OST
"Haru" (Rock version)	2010	—	—	Haru OST
"Haru" (X-mas version) (featuring Oh Joon-sung)	2010	72	—	Haru OST Christmas Version
"Stranger"	2011	27	63	Stranger OST
"Green Rain"	2013	44	18	The Queen's Classroom OST Part 2
"—" denotes releases that did not chart or were not released in that region.

== Other charted songs ==
List of songs, with selected chart positions and certifications, showing year released and album name
Title	Year	Peak chart positions				Album
Title	Year	KOR	KOR Hot	JPN Hot	US World	Album
"Obsession" (욕 (慾))	2010	39	—	—	—	Lucifer
"Love Still Goes On" (사.계.후)	2010	56	—	—	—	Lucifer
"Up & Down"	2010	58	—	—	18	Lucifer
"Electric Heart'"	2010	62	—	—	—	Lucifer
"Your Name"	2010	63	—	—	—	Lucifer
"Quasimodo" (화살)	2010	64	—	—	—	Lucifer
"A-Yo"	2010	65	—	—	—	Lucifer
"Life"	2010	69	—	—	—	Lucifer
"Ready or Not"	2010	71	—	—	—	Lucifer
"Shout Out" (악)	2010	75	—	—	—	Lucifer
"Wowowow"	2010	78	—	—	—	Lucifer
"Love Pain"	2010	81	—	—	—	Lucifer
"One" (하나)	2010	86	—	—	—	Hello
"Get It"	2010	110	—	—	—	Hello
"To Your Heart"	2011	—	—	67	—	The First
"Last Christmas" (Wham! cover)	2011	133	—	—	—	2011 SMTown Winter: The Warmest Gift
"Note"	2012	18	49	—	—	Sherlock
"Alarm Clock" (알람시계)	2012	23	51	—	—	Sherlock
"Clue"	2012	24	53	—	—	Sherlock
"Honesty" (늘 그 자리에)	2012	26	55	—	—	Sherlock
"Stranger" (낯선자)	2012	27	63	—	—	Sherlock
"The Reason"	2012	31	66	—	—	Sherlock
"Aside" (방백)	2013	23	32	—	—	Dream Girl – The Misconceptions of You
"Punch Drunk Love"	2013	30	83	—	—	Dream Girl – The Misconceptions of You
"Girls, Girls, Girls"	2013	31	68	—	—	Dream Girl – The Misconceptions of You
"Beautiful" (아름다워)	2013	32	54	—	22	Dream Girl – The Misconceptions of You
"Hitchhiking" (히치하이킹)	2013	36	91	—	—	Dream Girl – The Misconceptions of You
"Spoiler"	2013	37	97	—	17	Dream Girl – The Misconceptions of You
"Dynamite" (다이너마이트)	2013	45	—	—	21	Dream Girl – The Misconceptions of You
"Runaway"	2013	48	—	—	—	Dream Girl – The Misconceptions of You
"Sleepless Night" (떠나지 못해)	2013	100	87	—	—	Why So Serious? – The Misconceptions of Me
"Shine (Medusa I)"	2013	100	80	—	—	Why So Serious? – The Misconceptions of Me
"Nightmare"	2013	113	100	—	—	Why So Serious? – The Misconceptions of Me
"Orgel" (오르골)	2013	115	—	—	—	Why So Serious? – The Misconceptions of Me
"Like a Fire"	2013	116	92	—	—	Why So Serious? – The Misconceptions of Me
"Evil"	2013	121	—	—	21	Why So Serious? – The Misconceptions of Me
"Excuse Me Miss"	2013	123	—	—	—	Why So Serious? – The Misconceptions of Me
"Dangerous (Medusa II)"	2013	127	—	—	—	Why So Serious? – The Misconceptions of Me
"Breaking News"	2013	171	—	52	—	Boys Meet U
"Selene 6.23" (너와 나의 거리)	2013	9	13	—	—	The Misconceptions of Us
"Better Off" (버리고 가)	2013	44	55	—	—	The Misconceptions of Us
"Symptoms" (상사병)	2013	12	57	—	5	Everybody
"Close the Door" (닫아줘)	2013	31	89	—	—	Everybody
"One Minute Back" (1분만)	2013	32	90	—	—	Everybody
"Colorful"	2013	36	98	—	—	Everybody
"Queen of New York" (빗 속 뉴욕)	2013	37	95	—	—	Everybody
"Destination"	2013	42	—	—	—	Everybody
"Love Sick"	2015	9	—	—	—	Odd
"Odd Eye"	2015	21	—	—	—	Odd
"An Encore" (재연)	2015	26	—	—	—	Odd
"An Ode to You" (너의 노래가 되어)	2015	29	—	—	—	Odd
"Romance"	2015	31	—	—	—	Odd
"Farewell My Love" (이별의 길)	2015	36	—	—	—	Odd
"Black Hole"	2015	37	—	—	—	Odd
"Trigger"	2015	39	—	—	—	Odd
"Woof Woof"	2015	42	—	—	—	Odd
"Alive"	2015	43	—	—	—	Odd
"Savior"	2015	49	—	—	8	Married to the Music
"Hold You"	2015	79	—	—	14	Married to the Music
"Chocolate"	2015	80	—	—	10	Married to the Music
"Don't Let Me Go" (투명 우산)	2016	29	—	—	—	1 of 1
"Prism"	2016	52	—	—	—	1 of 1
"Feel Good"	2016	69	—	—	—	1 of 1
"Lipstick"	2016	76	—	—	—	1 of 1
"Shift"	2016	77	—	—	—	1 of 1
"So Amazing"	2016	78	—	—	—	1 of 1
"Don't Stop"	2016	80	—	—	—	1 of 1
"U Need Me"	2016	85	—	—	—	1 of 1
"Wish Upon a Star" (별빛 바램)	2016	84	—	—	16	1 and 1
"Beautiful Life" (한마디)	2016	86	—	—	12	1 and 1
"All Day All Night"	2018	93	—	—	—	The Story of Light EP.1
"You & I" (안녕)	2018	100	—	—	—	The Story of Light EP.1
"Lock You Down"	2018	95	19	—	—	The Story of Light EP.3
"Heart Attack"	2021	110	51	—	—	Don't Call Me
"Marry You"	2021	115	91	—	—	Don't Call Me
"Cøde"	2021	116	73	—	—	Don't Call Me
"Kind" (빈칸)	2021	117	55	—	—	Don't Call Me
"I Really Want You"	2021	118	79	—	—	Don't Call Me
"Kiss Kiss"	2021	124	98	—	—	Don't Call Me
"Body Rhythm"	2021	126	—	—	—	Don't Call Me
"Attention"	2021	127	—	—	—	Don't Call Me
"Area" (같은 자리)	2021	—	—	—	6	Atlantis
"Days and Years"	2021	—	—	—	7	Atlantis
"Juice"	2023	167	—	—	—	Hard
"Satellite"	2023	188	—	—	—	Hard
"Starlight"	2025	—	—	—	6	Poet Artist
"—" denotes releases that did not chart or were not released in that region.

== See also ==
- Shinee videography
- List of songs recorded by Shinee
- List of awards and nominations received by Shinee
