= Shinee World =

Shinee World may refer to:

- Shinee World (concert), the first independent concert tour by South Korean boy group Shinee
- Shinee World (album), a live album by Shinee
- Shinee World (DVD), a DVD by Shinee
- Shinee World or Shawols, the fanbase of South Korean boy group Shinee

== See also ==
- Shinee World 2012
- Shinee World 2013
