= Now Play It =

Defunct online music tuition service

- Website type: Music tuition downloads
- Available in: English
- Owner: Outside Line
- Creators: Ant Cauchi, Lloyd Salmons, Jim Beach
- Website: http://www.nowplayit.com
- Commercial: Yes
- Launched: Summer 2007

Now Play It was a UK-based music website that offered music tuition videos by paid download. It was the world's first online music tuition service to offer song lessons taught directly by the original recording artist.

== Overview ==
Now Play It was launched in the summer of 2007 and the company was based in Farringdon, London. The service was founded to cater for a youth audience, who prefer to learn away from conventional music lessons and are not necessarily able to read sheet music — the site's founders estimate 80% of the musicians involved cannot read sheet music either. In addition, the site aims to make sure artists' rights for the tablature they have composed are respected and rewarded.

The website offered downloadable video tutorials for songs, over a variety of instruments - guitar, bass, drums and piano or keyboard. Downloads were available in both MP4 and Windows Media format, and could be transferred to a variety of portable media players. 'Full' tutorials consisted of the lesson - a one-on-one lesson of the song by the artist(s) who originally recorded it; the recap - detailed tablature of the song, and the play through - the original promotional video of the song performed, with tablature overlaid on top. 'Lite' tutorials consisted of the play through and the recap, like the 'Full' tutorial, without the lesson component.

Songs downloaded counted towards the UK Singles Chart.

== Featured artists ==
Artists who performed full tutorials include Martha Wainwright, Andrew WK, Supergrass, Starsailor, Turin Brakes, Blur, KT Tunstall, The Magic Numbers, Matt Costa, Athlete, Duke Special, Little Man Tate, Shelly Poole, Graham Coxon, Idlewild, The Dandy Warhols, Reuben, Tom Baxter, Plain White T's, Palladium, Alphabeat, Deep Purple and Paul McCartney.

Lite tutorials included material by ABBA, Bon Jovi, Coldplay, Corinne Bailey Rae, Depeche Mode, Lily Allen, Guns N' Roses, Kylie Minogue, Fun Lovin' Criminals, Placebo, Bloc Party, Stereophonics, Joss Stone, Gorillaz, Radiohead, Richard Ashcroft, Snow Patrol, Queen, David Bowie, The Jam, The Police, The Dandy Warhols, Duran Duran, Nirvana, Morrissey and N.E.R.D.

== DVD ==
In November 2007 Now Play It released its first spin-off DVD, featuring full tutorials from KT Tunstall, Supergrass, Magic Numbers, Turin Brakes, Athlete and Graham Coxon. 10,000 copies of the DVD were donated to aspiring musicians in a joint promotion with Arts Council England, all of which were taken within hours of its release.

== Awards and commentary ==
Since its release Now Play It has received plaudits in the press; The Guardian described it as "a brilliantly executed idea", while the Daily Telegraph called it "a slick, anecdotal update of a form of rock schooling already flourishing on the internet". The Times hailed it as "a modern equivalent of Bert Weedon’s famous Play in a Day tutorial book". Now Play It has won two major industry awards — the "Best Digital Service" award at the 2007 BT Digital Music Awards and "Digital Achievement of the Year" at the 2008 Music Week Awards. It has also been nominated in the Music category of the 12th Webby Awards.
