= Han Jung-soo =

South Korean actor

- Born: November 20, 1973 (age 52); Seoul, South Korea
- Education: Seoul Institute of the Arts - Theater; Kyungwon University - Economics
- Occupation: Actor
- Years active: 2003–present

Korean name
- Hangul: 한정수
- Hanja: 韓正秀
- RR: Han Jeongsu
- MR: Han Chŏngsu

Han Jung-soo (born November 20, 1973) is a South Korean actor. He is best known for his roles in the television series The Slave Hunters and Prosecutor Princess.

== Filmography ==
=== Television series ===
Year	Title	Role
2007	Lucifer	Yoon Dae-shik
2007	Conspiracy in the Court	Seo Joo-pil
2007	The King and I	Eunuch Do Geum-pyo
2008	Painter of the Wind	Seo Jing
2009	Her Style	Kang Min-hyuk
2010	The Slave Hunters	General Choi
2010	Prosecutor Princess	Yoon Se-joon
2010	The Fugitive: Plan B	Corrupt detective (cameo)
2010	The King of Legend	Bok Gugeom
2011	Poseidon	Oh Min-hyuk
2012	Arang and the Magistrate	Mu-young
2013	She Is Wow!	Choi Ko-ya
2014	Blade Man	Secretary Go
2015	The Scholar Who Walks the Night	Baek In Ho
2017	Bad Thief, Good Thief	Choi Tae-suk

=== Film ===
Year	Title	Role
2003	Tube	Bong-ho
2004	Hypnotized	Jang-seo
2006	Sunflower	Chang-moo
2013	Queen of the Night	Eden (cameo)

=== Television show ===
Year	Title	Role	Notes	Ref.
2021	Leader's Romance	Cast Member		

== Theater ==
Year	Title	Role
2010	Fool for Love	Eddie
