= D×D×D =

DxDxD
- Digital and regular cover

Studio album by Shinee
- Released: January 1, 2016
- Recorded: 2015
- Studios: Bunkamura (Tokyo); Doobdoob (Seoul); In Grid (Seoul); SM Blue Cup (Seoul); SM Blue Ocean (Seoul); SM Yellow Tail (Seoul)
- Genre: J-pop
- Length: 44:08
- Languages: Japanese; English
- Label: EMI
- Producers: Nozomu Tsuchiya; Kevin Charge; Full Flava; FRH Sounds; G-High; Steven Lee; Caesar & Loui; Erik Lidbom; Chris Mayer; Jeff Miyahara; LDN Noise; Henrik Nordenback; Andreas Öberg; Takefumi Haketa

Shinee chronology
Odd (2015)	DxDxD (2016)	1 of 1 (2016)

Singles from D×D×D
- 1. "Your Number" Released: March 11, 2015; 2. "Sing Your Song" Released: October 27, 2015; 3. "D×D×D" Released: December 13, 2015

D×D×D (pronounced "D D D") is the fourth Japanese studio album by South Korean boy band Shinee. It was released on January 1, 2016, by Universal Music Japan sub label EMI Records. The album features three previously released singles, "Your Number", "Sing Your Song" and the Japanese version of previous Korean single "View", and one new single, "DxDxD". The album reached number one on the Oricon weekly chart, becoming the first album to do so in 2016. It was Shinee's second number one album in Japan following their 2014 release I'm Your Boy.

== Background and release ==
D×D×D is the fourth Japanese album released by Shinee. It was released in three versions: a limited CD+Blu-ray edition "A", a limited CD+DVD edition "B" and a regular edition. Both limited editions were housed in a digipack and a slipcase and came with 48-page photo booklet (type A), a trading card (one of five) and a special event application sheet. The Blu-ray of limited edition A, in addition to the music videos and making-ofs, also included a high-resolution (48 kHz / 24bit) recording of the album. The regular edition came with a 28-page photo booklet (type B) and a special event application sheet. The album includes all tracks from the group's last two Japanese singles "Sing Your Song" and "Your Number", a Japanese version of their Korean track "View", and seven new songs.

=== The Fourth Japan Tour ===
Shinee World 2016 is the fourth Japan nationwide concert tour by Shinee to promote their fourth Japanese studio album. The tour kicked off in Fukuoka on January 30, 2016, and ended in Hokkaido on April 24, 2016, with a total of 16 concerts in eight cities.

After the success of their first two-day Tokyo Dome stage in March 2015, Shinee returned with a more formal dome tour as part of their Japan Arena Tour. They performed at Kyocera Dome on May 14 and 15, 2016, and were back to Tokyo Dome on the 18th and 19th of the same month. In total, the tour attracted 350,000 people, bringing their cumulative concert attendance in Japan to over one million.

== Commercial performance ==
The album sold 44,921 copies in its first week.

== Track listing ==
D×D×D track listing
No.	Title	Lyrics	Music	Arrangement	Length
1.	"D×D×D"	Hidenori Tanaka (Agehasprings)	Kevin Charge (TG Publishing); Ricky Hanley; Hide Nakamura; Yumiko Okada	Charge	3:27
2.	"Wishful Thinking"	Kami Kaoru	Andreas Öberg; Daniel Caesar (Caesar & Loui); Ludwig Lindell (Caesar & Loui)	Jeff Miyahara	3:12
3.	"Wanted"	Sara Sakurai (T's Music)	Christian Fast; Didrik Thott; Henrik Nordenback	Nordenback	3:17
4.	"Boys Will be Boys"	Kanata Okajima	Erik Lidbom	Lidbom	3:58
5.	"View" (Japanese version)	Jonghyun; Sakurai	LDN Noise; Ryan S. Jhun; Adrian McKinnon	LDN Noise; Jhun; McKinnon	3:13
6.	"Your Number"	Junji Ishiwatari	Charge; Chris Meyer	Charge; Meyer	4:19
7.	"Good Good Feeling"	Sakurai	Charge; Meyer	Charge; Meyer; Kim Jin-hwan	3:46
8.	"Photograph"	Ishiwatari	Hanley; Rob Derbyshire	Full Flava; G-High (MonoTree)	3:14
9.	"Sweet Surprise"	Ishiwatari	Öberg; Andreas Stone Johansson; Steven Lee	Johansson; Lee; Kim	3:35
10.	"Sing Your Song"	Ishiwatari	Öberg; Carlos Okabe (Scoop Music); Michael Lee Cheung (MLC)	Scoop Music; Lidbom	4:05
11.	"Moon Drop"	Sakurai	Meyer; Shunsuke Harada (FRH Sounds)	FRH Sounds; Kim	3:40
12.	"Love"	Sakurai	Kenzie	Takefumi Haketa	4:22
Total length:					44:08

== Charts ==
=== Weekly charts ===
Chart performance for D×D×D
Chart (2016)	Peak position
Japanese Albums (Oricon)	1
Japanese Hot Albums (Billboard Japan)	3

=== Monthly charts ===
Monthly chart performance for D×D×D
Chart (2016)	Peak position
Japanese Albums (Oricon)	7

=== Year-end charts ===
Year-end chart performance for D×D×D
Chart (2016)	Position
Japanese Albums (Oricon)	72
