= Superstar (EP) =

- Digital and Regular edition cover

EP by Shinee
- Released: June 28, 2021
- Genre: J-pop
- Length: 16:15
- Languages: Japanese; Korean; English
- Label: EMI

Shinee chronology
Don't Call Me (2021)	Superstar (2021)	Hard (2023)

Singles from Superstar
- 1. "Superstar" Released: May 24, 2021

Superstar is the first Japanese extended play by South Korean boy group Shinee. It was released digitally on June 28, 2021, through EMI Records, with its physical release following a month later on July 28. The EP contains five songs including the lead single, "Superstar". It reached number one on Oricon's weekly album chart.

== Background and release ==
On May 23, 2021, Shinee commemorated the 10th anniversary of their debut in Japan with an online fan meeting, Bistro de Shinee. They announced the release of their upcoming Japanese album, their first in three years, and previewed two new songs, "Superstar" and "Seasons". Lead single "Superstar" was released on digital music platforms the following day. "Superstar" is a dance-pop song with the message, "Let's live our lives trusting ourselves instead of comparing ourselves with others." On June 25, it was announced that Shinee would release the digital edition of the EP on June 28, followed by the physical release a month later on July 28. The EP features the two songs already previewed, as well as three additional tracks: a Japanese version of Shinee's previous Korean release, "Don't Call Me", "Atlantis", and another new Japanese song, "Closer". The music video for "Superstar" premiered on YouTube on June 29.

== Commercial performance ==
Superstar debuted at number seven on Billboard Japan Hot Albums on the chart issue dated July 7, 2021. It rose to number two following the release of the EP's physical edition on July 28. The EP also debuted at number one on the weekly Oricon Albums Chart, selling 73,975 copies in the first week. It was Shinee's first release to top the chart since 2018's Shinee The Best From Now On, and their fourth overall. Superstar was certified Gold by RIAJ for selling 100,000 album shipments.

== Track listing ==
Superstar track listing
No.	Title	Lyrics	Music	Arrangement	Length
1.	"Superstar"	Amon Hayashi (Digz Inc.)	LDN Noise; Lenno Linjama; Andrew Jackson; Iain James	LDN Noise; Lenno Linjama	2:55
2.	"Closer"	Junji Ishiwatari	Richy Sebastian (1and2 Productions); Antoni Polimeni (1and2 Productions)	1and2 Productions	2:43
3.	"Don't Call Me" (Japanese version)	Junji Ishiwatari; Kenzie	Kenzie; Dem Jointz; Rodnae "Chikk" Bell	Dem Jointz; Yoo Young-jin; Kenzie; Ryan S. Jhun; robbin	3:40
4.	"Atlantis"	Hwang Yoo-bin; Changmo	Matt Thomson; Max Lynedoch Graham; Sir James F. Reynolds; Gabriel Brandes; Britt "PolyAnna" Pols; Engelina Andrina; Changmo; Yoo Young-jin	Arcades; Imlay; Yoo Young-jin	2:58
5.	"Seasons"	Sara Sakurai (T's Music)	Kenzie; Adrian McKinnon	Kenzie	3:55
Total length:					16:15

== Charts ==
=== Weekly charts ===
Weekly chart performance for Superstar
Chart (2021)	Peak position
Japan Hot Albums (Billboard Japan)	2
Japanese Albums (Oricon)	1

=== Year-end charts ===
Year-end chart performance for Superstar
Chart (2021)	Position
Japanese Albums (Oricon)	46
Japan Hot Albums (Billboard Japan)	60

== Certifications and sales figures ==
Certifications for Superstar
Region	Certification	Certified units/sales
Japan (RIAJ)	Gold	100,000^{^}
^{^} Shipments figures based on certification alone.

== Release history ==
Release history and formats for Superstar
Region	Date	Format(s)	Label	Ref.
Various	June 28, 2021	Digital download; streaming	EMI	
Japan	June 28, 2021	Digital download; streaming	EMI	
Japan	July 28, 2021	CD; CD+DVD	EMI	
