= Prosecutor Princess =

South Korean television drama series

- Promotional poster
- Genre: Romance; Comedy; Legal drama
- Written by: So Hyun-kyung
- Directed by: Jin Hyuk
- Starring: Kim So-yeon; Park Si-hoo
- Composer: Oh Jun Sung
- Country of origin: South Korea
- Original language: Korean
- No. of episodes: 16

Production
- Executive producer: Kim Young-sup (SBS)
- Producers: Cho Sung won Hong Jong-chan; Kwon Yong han Song Won seok
- Running time: Wednesday and Thursday at 21:55 (KST)
- Production company: Hoga Entertainment

Original release
- Network: SBS
- Release: March 31 – May 21, 2010

Prosecutor Princess (Korean: 검사 프린세스; RR: Geomsa peurinseseu) is a 2010 South Korean television series starring Kim So-yeon, Park Si-hoo, Han Jung-soo and Choi Song-hyun. The 16-episode series aired on SBS from March 31 to May 20, 2010, on Wednesdays and Thursdays at 21:55.

== Plot ==
After Ma Hye-ri (Kim So-yeon) passes the bar exam, she discovers that her love of fashion and dislike of overtime interfere with her ability to carry out her duties as a public prosecutor. She faces opposition from contemptuous colleagues and exasperated superiors. With her career on a downward spiral, she enlists the help of mysterious attorney Seo In-woo (Park Si-hoo).

== Cast ==
=== Main ===
- Kim So-yeon as Ma Hye-ri

freshly appointed prosecutor, daughter of construction company president

- Park Si-hoo as Seo In-woo (Shin Dong-ki as young Seo In-woo)

lawyer, educated and raised in USA, returned to Korea with hidden agenda

- Han Jung-soo as Yoon Se-joon

prosecutor, widower with a daughter

- Choi Song-hyun as Jin Jeong-seon

prosecutor, single, living with her mother who is raising Yoon Se-joon's daughter

=== Supporting ===
==== Prosecutor Office ====
- Kim Sang-ho as Na Joong-seok, chief prosecutor
- Yoo Gun as Lee Min-seok, prosecutor
- Choi Sung-ho as Chae Ji-woon, prosecutor
- Lee Jong-suk as Lee Woo-hyun, Yoon Se-joon's investigator
- Lee Seung-hyung as Cha Myung-soo, Ma Hye-ri's investigator
- Lee Eun-hee as Lee Jung-im, Ma Hye-ri's paralegal

==== People around Ma Hye-ri ====
- Choi Jung-woo as Ma Sang-tae, Ma Hye-ri's father
- Yang Hee-kyung as Park Ae-ja, Ma Hye-ri's mother
- Min Young-won as Lee Yoo-na, Ma Hye-ri's best friend

==== Others ====
- Park Jung-ah as Jenny Ahn, lawyer, Seo In-woo's friend
- Sung Byung-sook as Han Mi-ok, Jin Jeong-seon's mother
- Kim Ji-won as Yoon Bin, Yoon Se-joon's daughter
- Lee Il-hwa as Ha Jung-ran, bar owner
- Sunwoo Jae-duk as Go Man-chul, Ma Sang-tae's junior from his hometown
- Jeong Gyu-Soo as Shin Jung-nam, flower shop owner
- Moon Joon-young as minor in club

=== Special appearance ===
- Baek Seung-hyeon as Kim Dong-seok, criminal chased by Yoon Se-joon (ep. 1 & 7)
- Choi Eun-joo as Lee Moon-hae, Kim Dong-seok's accomplice (ep. 1 & 7)
- Kim Dong-gyun as man who trespassed Hye-ri's apartment (ep. 9 & 11)
- Lee Soo-jin as Hye-ri's law school friend
- Kim Sung-hoon as fitness trainer
- Jeon Jin-gi as detective
- Ahn Sang-tae as hotel employee

== Ratings ==
Episode #	Original broadcast date	Average audience share			
Episode #	Original broadcast date	TNmS Ratings		AGB Nielsen	
Episode #	Original broadcast date	Nationwide	Seoul National Capital Area	Nationwide	Seoul National Capital Area
1	31 March 2010	7.3%	8.9%	8.0%	9.3%
2	1 April 2010	8.8%	9.4%	8.7%	9.8%
3	7 April 2010	9.6%	9.7%	10.0%	10.3%
4	8 April 2010	9.7%	9.4%	10.1%	11.2%
5	14 April 2010	10.8%	10.9%	10.4%	11.3%
6	15 April 2010	10.7%	11.0%	9.3%	9.8%
7	21 April 2010	10.4%	10.8%	10.3%	10.3%
8	22 April 2010	11.0%	11.1%	10.6%	10.8%
9	28 April 2010	9.9%	10.2%	11.0%	11.5%
10	29 April 2010	9.6%	9.6%	10.1%	10.4%
11	5 May 2010	9.9%	9.8%	10.7%	11.8%
12	6 May 2010	11.5%	11.5%	10.8%	10.8%
13	12 May 2010	9.6%	9.2%	10.3%	10.4%
14	13 May 2010	12.0%	11.5%	12.1%	12.3%
15	19 May 2010	12.1%	12.6%	11.1%	10.8%
16	20 May 2010	12.4%	11.7%	12.1%	13.2%
Average		10.3%	-	10.4%	-

== International broadcast ==
It aired in Japan on cable channel KNTV beginning October 18, 2010, then on terrestrial network Fuji TV in 2011.

== Original soundtrack ==
No.	Title	Artist	Length
1.	"Fly High"	Shinee	3:04
2.	"Give Me"	Nine Muses, Seo In-young
3.	"사랑해본 적 있나요 曾經愛過吧"	Kim Yoo-kyung
4.	"Lost"	Han Bo-ra (AB Avenue)
5.	"Goodbye My Princess?"	Monday Kiz
6.	"Who Is"	GreenCacao
7.	"She Is A Princess"	Oh Jun-seong
8.	"Working Or Walking"	Oh Jun-seong
9.	"Blue Sky"	Oh Jun-seong
10.	"I Can Do It" (검찰청 사람들 檢察廳人們)	Oh Jun-seong
11.	"Amazoness"	Oh Jun-seong
12.	"Love Waltz" (사랑일까 愛)	Oh Jun-seong
13.	"Love Is You"	Oh Jun-seong
14.	"Burning Heart"	Oh Jun-seong
15.	"기억하니 記得"	Oh Jun-seong
16.	"Only For You"	Oh Jun-seong
17.	"Goodbye My Love"	Oh Jun-seong
18.	"Cooking Sunday"	Oh Jun-seong

=== Fly High ===
"Fly High" was the first digital single and soundtrack to be released from Prosecutor Princess OST, performed by South Korean R&B boy group Shinee. "Fly High" ranked at spot 46 and peaked at spot 38 of Gaon Chart upon release.

==== Background and release ====
"Fly High" was composed by Oh Jun-seong of Forrest Media who was the producer of the Prosecutor Princess OST, and the vocals were provided by Shinee of SM Entertainment. The song was released as one of the two tracks of digital single Prosecutor Princess OST Part 1 on April 2, 2010.

==== Promotion ====
A promotional music video of "Fly High" featuring scenes from the TV drama series was released in late May 2010. The song was performed by Shinee during their first Asia tour Shinee World and the live version was included in live album Shinee World. The Japanese version was performed during Shinee's first Japanese arena tour Shinee World 2012.

Track listing

Prosecutor Princess OST Part 1
No.	Title	Music	Artist	Length
1.	"Fly High"	Oh Jun-seong	Shinee	3:04
2.	"Fly High" (Instrumental)	Oh Jun-seong	Shinee	3:04
Total length:				6:08

Chart performance

Chart	Debut position	Peak position
Gaon Weekly singles	46	38
