= Five (Shinee album) =

- Digital and regular edition cover

Studio album by Shinee
- Released: January 27, 2017
- Recorded: 2016–17
- Genres: Pop; pop rock; teen pop
- Languages: Japanese; English
- Label: EMI

Shinee chronology
1 of 1 (2016)	Five (2017)	Shinee the Best from Now On (2018)

Singles from Five
- 1. "Kimi no Seide" Released: May 18, 2016; 2. "Winter Wonderland" Released: December 21, 2016; 3. "Get the Treasure" Released: January 27, 2017

Five is the fifth Japanese studio album by South Korean boy band Shinee. It was released digitally on January 27, 2017 by Universal Music Japan sub label EMI Records, while the physical edition was released on February 22, 2017. The album debuted at number three on Oricon weekly chart, selling 68,102 copies. It was awarded in the Best 3 Albums (Asia) category at the 32nd Japan Gold Disc Award.

This was Shinee's last original release to feature Jonghyun in his lifetime before his death on December 18, 2017.

== Promotion ==
To promote the album, Shinee embarked on their fifth Japan tour, Shinee World 2017. The tour kicked off in Fukui on January 28, 2017 and ended in Tokyo on April 30, 2017, with a total of 25 concerts in 10 cities.

== Track listing ==
Five track listing
No.	Title	Lyrics	Music	Arrangement	Length
1.	"Gentleman"	Junji Ishiwatari	Andreas Öberg; Ninos Hanna; Saeed Molavi (The Euroz); Nadir Benkahla (The Euroz)	The Euroz	2:51
2.	"Mr. Right Guy"	Hidenori Tanaka (Agehasprings)	Lasse Lindorff; Martin Larsson; Lemar Obika	Deekay	3:21
3.	"ABOAB"	Sara Sakurai (T's Music)	Chris Meyer; Stephan Elfgren	Elfgren	3:46
4.	"Kimi no Seide" (君のせいで; lit. Because of You)	Ishiwatari	Meyer; Funk Uchino; Toshiya Hosokawa (Serial-8)	Meyer	4:16
5.	"Do Me Right"	Sakurai	Janne Hyöty (Sugar House Publishing); Figge Boström; Takarot	Shinji Tanaka (Sound Creation); Takarot	3:43
6.	"Become Undone"	Sakurai	Santiago Rodriguez; Nait "Rawknait" Masuku; Dan Leary; Martin Wiik	Wiik	3:17
7.	"Get the Treasure"	Natsumi Kobayashi; Jeff Miyahara	Ilang Lumholt; Joe J. Lee "Kairos"; Darren "Baby Dee Beats" Smith; Marcus Winther-John	Kairos; Smith	3:43
8.	"1 of 1" (Japanese version)	Sakurai; JQ (Makeumine Works); Jo Mi-yang (Makeumine Works); Bae Sung-hyun (Makeumine Works); Lee Seu-ran; Kim In-hyung; Park Seong-hee	Mike Daley; Mitchell Owens; Michael Jiminez; Jeremy "Tay" Jasper; MZMC	Daley; Owens	3:26
9.	"Nothing to Lose"	Ishiwatari	Kevin Charge (TG Publishing); Peter Boyes; Meyer	Charge	3:03
10.	"Melody"	Amon Hayashi (Digz Inc.)	Didrik Thott; Peter Boyes; Josef Melin (Songs of Sweden)	Melin	4:14
11.	"Winter Wonderland"	Hidenori Tanaka	Erik Lidbom; Takarot	Lidbom; Takarot	4:08
12.	"Diamond Sky"	Ishiwatari	Steven Lee; Magnus Funemyr	Steven Lee	4:12
Total length:					44:07

== Charts ==
=== Weekly charts ===
Chart performance for Five
Chart (2017)	Peak position
Japan Hot Albums (Billboard Japan)	3
Japanese Albums (Oricon)	3

=== Monthly charts ===
Monthly chart performance for Five
Chart (2017)	Peak position
Japanese Albums (Oricon)	4

=== Year-end charts ===
Year-end chart performance for Five
Chart (2017)	Position
Japanese Albums (Oricon)	53
Japanese Hot Albums (Billboard Japan)	69
