= Shinee the Best from Now On =

- Limited edition cover

Compilation album by Shinee
- Released: April 18, 2018
- Studios: Doobdoob (Seoul); Groove (Seoul); Hub (Seoul); In Grid (Seoul); Jeff's (Tokyo); SM Blue Ocean (Seoul); SM Booming System (Seoul); SM Yellow Tail (Seoul)
- Genre: J-pop
- Length: 76:24
- Languages: Japanese; English
- Label: EMI

Shinee chronology
Five (2017)	Shinee the Best from Now On (2018)	The Story of Light (2018)

Singles from Shinee the Best from Now On
- 1. "From Now On" Released: March 26, 2018

Shinee the Best from Now On is the first Japanese compilation by South Korean boy group Shinee. The album was released on April 18, 2018, preceded by a new single, "From Now On". The album officially marks the first Shinee release to feature Jonghyun after his death on December 18, 2017. The album sold over 95,000 copies in Japan, and was certified Gold there. It peaked at number one on the Oricon charts.

== Background and release ==
Shinee's lead vocalist Jonghyun died on December 18, 2017. In February 2018, it was announced that Shinee would release their first Japanese compilation album, Shinee the Best from Now On. Shinee performed new songs from the album at their concert Shinee World The Best 2018, including lead single "From Now On". The songs had been recorded prior to Jonghyun's death and featured his vocals. Following the concert, "From Now On" entered the Billboard Japan Hot 100 despite not having been officially released due to high levels of Twitter activity surrounding the performance. Fans began using the song title as a hashtag to share their love for the group. Shinee promoted the single through lyric videos uploaded to their Instagram Stories ahead of its release on March 26.

Shinee the Best from Now On was released on April 18, 2018, featuring 20 songs. Two limited edition versions were also released, containing a bonus disc with eight additional songs, a 64-page photobook and a documentary of the concert Shinee World 2017. To commemorate the album's release, five towers in different Japanese cities, representing the five Shinee members, were lit up in Shinee's signature aqua colour. This included Tokyo Tower, which also hosted a costume exhibition. Messages from fans to Shinee were published in The Asahi Shimbun following a social media campaign. On May 23, the new songs included on the limited edition bonus disc were released digitally for the first time as part of an EP titled From Now On.

== Track listing ==
Shinee the Best from Now On track listing
No.	Title	Length
1.	"Replay (Kimi wa Boku no Everything)" (Japanese version)	3:35
2.	"Juliette" (Japanese version)	3:26
3.	"Lucifer" (Japanese version)	3:55
4.	"Sherlock" (Japanese version)	3:59
5.	"Dazzling Girl"	3:31
6.	"1000nen, Zutto Soba ni Ite..."	4:14
7.	"Fire"	3:33
8.	"Breaking News"	3:38
9.	"Boys Meet U"	2:46
10.	"3 2 1"	3:33
11.	"Everybody" (Japanese version)	4:11
12.	"Lucky Star"	3:23
13.	"Downtown Baby"	3:55
14.	"Your Number"	4:20
15.	"Sing Your Song"	4:04
16.	"DxDxD"	3:27
17.	"Kimi no Seide"	4:16
18.	"Winter Wonderland"	4:10
19.	"Get the Treasure"	3:44
20.	"From Now On"	4:44
Total length:		76:24

Limited edition A and B (bonus disc)
No.	Title	Length
1.	"Colors of the Season" (From Now On version)	4:29
2.	"Every Time"	3:37
3.	"Tell Me Your Name"	3:12
4.	"Your Number" (From Now On version)	4:19
5.	"Married to the Music" (Japanese version)	3:34
6.	"Melody" (From Now On version)	4:13
7.	"Diamond Sky" (From Now On version)	4:12
8.	"Replay (Kimi wa Boku no Everything)" (Abbey Road Special) (bonus track)	3:35
Total length:		31:11

From Now On track listing
No.	Title	Length
1.	"From Now On"	4:44
2.	"Every Time"	3:37
3.	"Tell Me Your Name"	3:12
4.	"Married to the Music" (Japanese version)	3:34
Total length:		15:07

== Charts ==
=== Weekly charts ===
Chart performance for Shinee the Best from Now On
Chart (2018)	Peak position
Japan Hot Albums (Billboard Japan)	1
Japanese Albums (Oricon)	1

=== Monthly charts ===
Monthly chart performance for Shinee the Best from Now On
Chart (2018)	Peak position
Japanese Albums (Oricon)	3

=== Year-end charts ===
Year-end chart performance for Shinee the Best from Now On
Chart (2018)	Position
Japan Hot Albums (Billboard Japan)	65
Japanese Albums (Oricon)	43

== Release history ==
Release dates and formats for Shinee the Best from Now On
Region	Date	Format	Edition	Label	Ref.
Japan	April 18, 2018	CD; Blu-ray	Limited Edition A	EMI	
Japan	April 18, 2018	CD; DVD	Limited Edition B	EMI	
Japan	April 18, 2018	CD	Regular	EMI	
Various	April 18, 2018	Digital download; streaming	Regular	EMI	
Various	May 23, 2018	Digital download; streaming	From Now On	EMI	
