= Palladium (British band) =

Indie rock band, active 2006-2009

Background information
- Origin: England
- Genres: Indie rock
- Years active: 2006–2009
- Labels: Virgin Records
- Members: Peter Pepper; Rostas Fez; Rufio Sandilands; Rocky Morris
- Website: www.palladiumofficial.com

Palladium were an English indie rock band, active from 2006 until early 2009.

== Career ==
The four members became acquaintances through various tours on the session musician circuit and played their first gig together under the moniker "The Peppernotes", at a Caribbean Restaurant dressed as Peter Pan in drag. Since then they changed their name to Palladium and played alongside Amy Winehouse, Alphabeat, Mika, The Thrills and The Kooks. They were signed to Virgin Records.

Palladium's debut single "Happy Hour" was released in July 2007. Their intended debut album, 'The Way It's Not', was recorded with Tony Hoffer in 2007.

Following the release of their debut single, Palladium made numerous visits to schools across the UK, including Blue Coat Comprehensive School, Walsall. A short set of songs was performed, followed by a question and answer session for students. The band also handed out free badges, postcards and other merchandise to students.

Palladium announced via MySpace in November 2008 that problems with their record label would be leading to a hiatus, and in January 2009 announced via their blog that they would be splitting up. Band members Peter Pepper and Rostas Fez have since gone on to form a band named Soho Beach House.

== Discography ==
=== Singles ===
Release date	Title	Chart Positions			Album
Release date	Title	UK Singles Chart	UK Indie Chart	UK Rock Chart	Album
23 July 2007	"Happy Hour"	-	-	-	The Way It's Not
5 November 2007	"High 5"	44	-	-	The Way It's Not

=== Albums ===
- 'The Way It's Not' (Unreleased)
