= Odd (album) =

- Digital and A version cover

Studio album by Shinee
- Released: May 18, 2015
- Studios: Doobdoob (Seoul); In Grid (Seoul); Seoul; SM Big Shot (Seoul); SM Blue Cup (Seoul); SM Blue Ocean (Seoul); SM Yellow Tail (Seoul); Sound Pool (Seoul); Studio-T (Seoul)
- Genre: K-pop
- Length: 39:02
- Languages: Korean; English
- Labels: SM; KT Music

Shinee chronology
| I'm Your Boy (2014) | Odd (2015) | D×D×D (2016) |

Singles from Odd
- 1. "View" Released: May 18, 2015

Married to the Music reissue cover
- Physical version cover

Singles from Married to the Music
- 1. "Married to the Music" Released: August 3, 2015

Music video
- "View" on YouTube "Married to the Music" on YouTube

Odd is the fourth Korean studio album (seventh overall) by South Korean boy band Shinee. It was released digitally and physically on May 18, 2015, under SM Entertainment and distributed by KT Music. The album contains 11 songs, including the lead single, "View". The repackaged album, Married to the Music, was released on August 3, 2015, with four additional songs.

The album received favorable reviews from music critics, who praised Shinee's experimental and playful sound which results in a "fresh and evolved album", as well as the group's return to their R&B side. The album was commercially successful in South Korea—it charted at number one on the Gaon Album Chart, selling over 165,000 copies during the first month of release. It also sold over 2,000 copies in the US.

== Composition ==
Odd contains a total of 11 songs, including songs produced by international producer teams The Stereotypes and the Underdogs, British composing group LDN Noise, G'harah "PK" Degeddingseze, composer Kenzie, and Steven Lee. The lead single, "View", is produced by LDN Noise and is an upbeat song of the deep house genre. It has been described as having a "refined and sensual" sound, expressing love's beauty as a "mixture of diverse senses". Shinee member Jonghyun wrote the lyrics to the song. Member Minho stated that he was worried about the new concept since the musical style was different to what the group had done before, which explains the album's title.

The repackaged album Married to the Music includes four additional songs: "Married to the Music", "Savior", "Hold You" and "Chocolate". "Married to the Music" is described as funky disco and is the work of LDN Noise. Jeff Benjamin of Billboard described it as "a journey of different genres, opening with what initially sounds like a "beatbox-heavy, hip-hop sound" before flipping to a "sexy, bouncy electronic beat on the verses until we get to a funk-inspired chorus that mixes in horn blasts, groovy guitar strums and classic boy-band harmonies". "Savior", which is written by Kenzie, is characterized by trendy and sensual lyrics. "Hold You" is a R&B song which was produced by the Stereotypes and Deez. "Chocolate", a medium-tempo R&B track written by group member Jonghyun and Yankie, is described as a charming love story that is sweet like chocolate.

== Release and promotion ==
On May 11, 2015, SM Entertainment uploaded a trailer video to their YouTube channel, announcing the upcoming release of Shinee's fourth Korean album, Odd. They later uploaded two more album trailers and teaser images of the members. Shinee performed five songs from the album at their concert, Shinee World IV: lead single "View", "Love Sick", "An Ode to You", "Woof Woof", and "An Encore". Odd was digitally and physically released on May 18, 2015, and was the group's first Korean release after a two-year hiatus. On May 21, the group began their promotions for "View" on music shows, starting with Mnet's M Countdown and followed by KBS' Music Bank, MBC's Show! Music Core and SBS' Inkigayo. As part of the promotion, the group members guested on several variety shows including Hello Counselor, Saturday Night Live Korea and Non-Summit. They also appeared on fellow member Jonghyun's radio show, Blue Night.

On July 29, SM announced that the album would be reissued under the title Married to the Music, with the addition of four new songs. Snippets of the new songs were uploaded to social media to promote its release. Married to the Music was released on August 3. Shinee performed the title track, "Married to the Music", on music shows, with choreography provided by Tony Testa and Hwang Sang-hoon.

== Critical reception ==
Professional ratings
Review scores
| Source | Rating |
|---|---|
| Billboard | 3.5/5 stars |

Melon's pop music critics chose Shinee's Odd as one of the best albums for the first half of 2015, praising the vocal skills of the members and stating: "Shinee once again demonstrates exemplary production that encompasses both the pleasure of listening and the pleasure of watching." Odd was also selected as one of MTV Iggy's "25 Best Albums of 2015", praising the "experimenting and playing with old and new sounds, resulting in a fresh and evolved album". The title song, "View", got a positive response, describing it as a "great, laid back summer jam" even though "the song fools us into thinking it's an uptempo ballad before reaching its techno peak at the chorus."

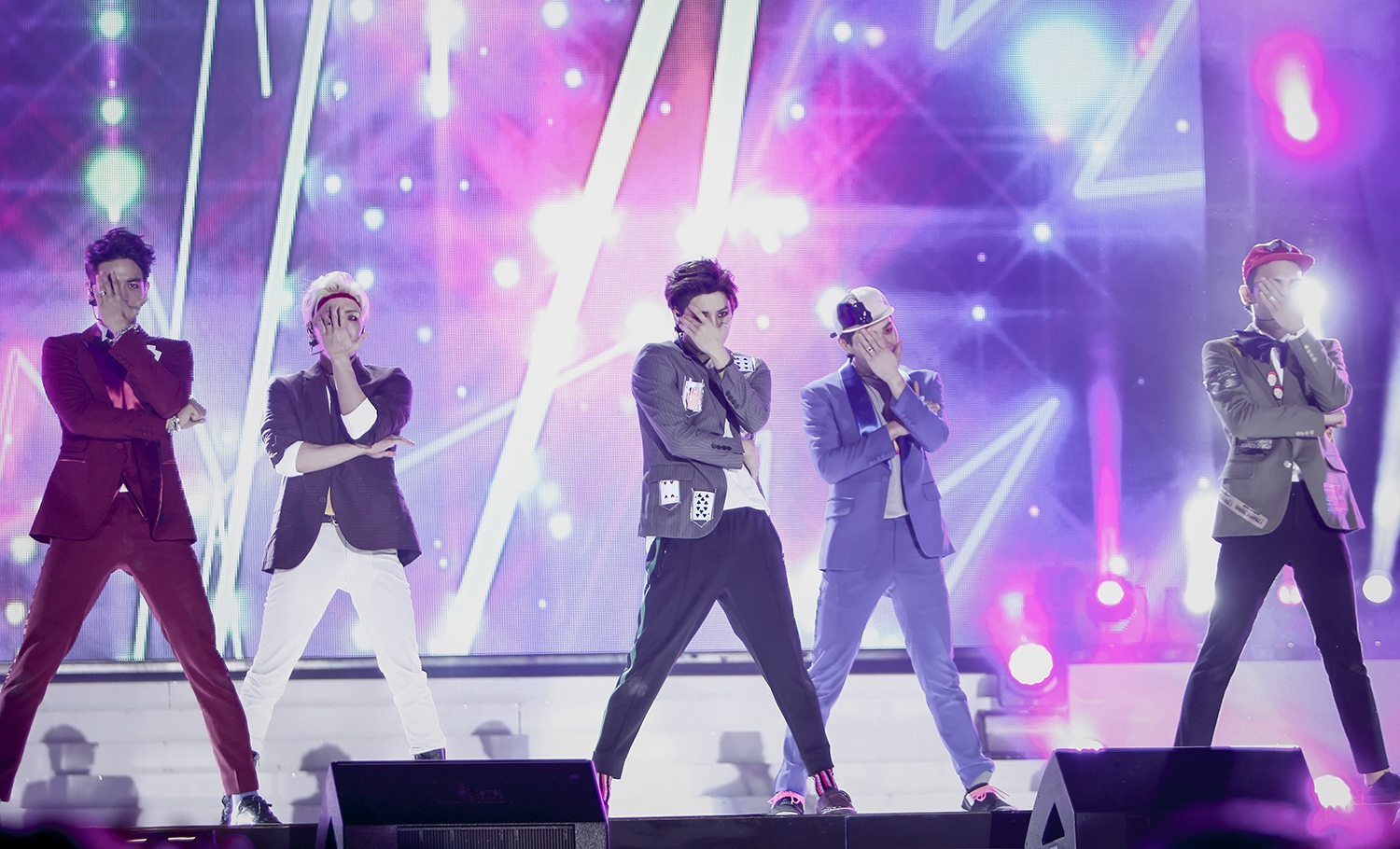
Shinee performing "Married To The Music" at the SBS Inkigayo 'Korea Music Festival' in Sokcho on August 9, 2015.

Jeff Benjamin of Billboard praised the title song, stating, "Despite boasting completely different vibes, "View" isn't that different from "Everybody" in that both have the same repetitive chorus structures, but the latter throws piles of electronica into the chorus while "View" keeps its instrumentation very simple. By going against what's expected, Shinee actually ends up taking more of a risk by doing less and it pays off handsomely." Album track "Odd Eye" also received praise, which is written and composed by member Jonghyun. Benjamin states the group "return to the R&B side of Shinee with feathery vocals, tight harmonies and member Onew's falsetto howls acting a centerpiece to this grooving opener." But he also criticized some of the songs of the album, like "An Ode to You", saying the "unnecessary electric guitar riffs are added to the mix that soils the pure production." "Black Hole" is also criticized, stating, "it's not only the shortest song of the album, but also one of the most forgettable." Overall he gave the album 3.5 stars out of 5. The title song, "View", was also included in Billboard's "Top 20 Best K-Pop Songs of 2015".

Odd was also nominated as one of the "albums of glory" by Arena Homme + magazine. Shinee was the only idol group on the list. Kim Yun-ha, a music critic for Arena Homme +, writes: "K-pop, which has dominated the popular music scene for years, can sometimes seem like a journey to discover true "pop" in a music industry once divided into ballads and dance music. If you agree with this proposition, Shinee is undoubtedly the frontier at the forefront of this trend. Fearlessly opening doors to new dimensions each time, they reached the limit of humanity with "Everybody", and arrived at Shinee's own world of stateless pop. They continue to dance and sing in a place no one can reach."

== Commercial performance ==
Odd debuted at number nine on Billboard's Heatseekers Albums Chart, becoming Shinee's fourth album to enter the top ten. It reached number one on Billboard's World Albums Chart, Shinee's first album to do so 2013's Why So Serious? – The Misconceptions of Me, making Shinee the fifth K-pop act to earn multiple number one albums on this chart. It sold 2,000 copies in the US. The album stayed in the top ten of the Billboard World Albums Chart for three consecutive weeks after its release on May 18. In South Korea, Odd debuted at number one on the weekly Gaon Album Chart. It was the best-selling album of the month, selling over 165,000 copies, and the eighth best-selling album of the year. As of 2022, it has sold over 193,000 copies in South Korea, as well as 41,000 copies in Japan.

Married to the Music debuted at number one on the weekly Gaon Album Chart. It was the second best-selling album of August 2015. It sold over 87,000 copies in 2015, and has sold over 107,000 copies overall since its release.

== Accolades ==
Music program awards
| Song | Program | Date | Ref. |
|---|---|---|---|
| "View" | Show Champion | May 27, 2015 | |
| "View" | M Countdown | May 28, 2015 | |
| "View" | M Countdown | June 4, 2015 | |
| "View" | Music Bank | May 29, 2015 | |
| "View" | Music Bank | June 5, 2015 | |
| "View" | Show! Music Core | June 6, 2015 | |
| "View" | Inkigayo | May 31, 2015 | |
| "View" | Inkigayo | June 7, 2015 | |
| "View" | The Show | June 9, 2015 | |
| "Married to the Music" | Show Champion | August 12, 2015 | |
| "Married to the Music" | Music Bank | August 14, 2015 | |

Awards and nominations for Odd
| Ceremony | Year | Category | Result | Ref. |
|---|---|---|---|---|
| Gaon Chart Music Awards | 2016 | Album of the Year – 2nd Quarter | Nominated | |
| Golden Disc Awards | 2016 | Disk Bonsang | Won | |
| Golden Disc Awards | 2016 | Disk Daesang | Nominated | |
| Melon Music Awards | 2015 | Album of the Year | Nominated | |
| Mnet Asian Music Awards | 2015 | Album of the Year | Nominated | |
| Seoul Music Awards | 2016 | Bonsang Award | Won | |

== Track listing ==
Odd track listing
| No. | Title | Lyrics | Music | Arrangement | Length |
|---|---|---|---|---|---|
| 1. | "Odd Eye" | Jonghyun; Key^{[b]} | Jonghyun; Jonathan Yip; Jeremy Reeves; Ray Romulus; Ray McCullough | Jonghyun; The Stereotypes | 3:21 |
| 2. | "Love Sick" | Kenzie | Kenzie; Harvey Mason Jr. (The Underdogs); Damon Thomas (The Underdogs); Mike Daley; Dewain Whitmore | Kenzie; The Underdogs; Daley; Whitmore | 3:20 |
| 3. | "View" | Jonghyun | LDN Noise; Ryan S. Jhun; Adrian McKinnon | LDN Noise; Jhun; McKinnon | 3:10 |
| 4. | "Romance" | Kim In-hyung; Minho^{[a]} | Andreas Öberg; Maria Marcus; Gustav Karlström | Öberg; Marcus; Karlström | 3:36 |
| 5. | "Trigger" | Kenzie | Kenzie; Deez; Rodnae "Chikk" Bell | Deez | 4:01 |
| 6. | "Farewell My Love" (이별의 길; Ibyeorui gil) | Jeon Ji-eun (January 8th (lalala Studio)); Hwang Seon-jeong (January 8th (lalala Studio)); Kim Jeong-mi (January 8th (lalala Studio)); Minho^{[a]} | Steven Lee; Jimmy Andrew Richard; G'harah "PK" Degeddingseze (80hdmuzic) | 80hdmuzic | 4:00 |
| 7. | "An Ode to You" (너의 노래가 되어; Neoui noraega doeeo) | Kim Hyun-woo (Clef Crew) | Kim Hyun-woo; Kim Du-hyung (Clef Crew) | Park Chang-hyun | 4:17 |
| 8. | "Alive" | Kim Eana; MC Meta; Key^{[b]} | Mason; Thomas; Darius Logan (Blaq Tuxedo); Dominique Logan (Blaq Tuxedo) | The Underdogs; Blaq Tuxedo | 3:05 |
| 9. | "Woof Woof" | Kim In-hyung | Will Simms; Greig Watts (DWB Music); Paul Drew (DWB Music); Pete Barringer (DWB Music) | Simms; DWB Music | 3:16 |
| 10. | "Black Hole" | Jeon Gan-di | Albi Albertsson (Mussashi); Öberg; Andreas Carlsson | Mussashi; Öberg; Carlsson | 2:52 |
| 11. | "An Encore" (재연; Jaeyeon) | Kim Jin-hwan | Kim Jin-hwan | Kim Jin-hwan | 4:04 |
| Total length: | | | | | 39:02 |

Married to the Music track listing
| No. | Title | Lyrics | Music | Arrangement | Length |
|---|---|---|---|---|---|
| 1. | "Married to the Music" | Kim Boo-min; Jeon Gan-di | LDN Noise; Zak Waters; McKinnon; Jhun | LDN Noise; Waters; McKinnon; Jhun | 3:35 |
| 2. | "Savior" | Kenzie | Kenzie; Waters; Alexander DeLeon | Waters; DeLeon | 3:54 |
| 3. | "Odd Eye" | Jonghyun; Key^{[b]} | Jonghyun; Yip; Reeves; Romulus; McCullough | Jonghyun; The Stereotypes | 3:21 |
| 4. | "Love Sick" | Kenzie | Kenzie; Mason; Thomas; Daley; Whitmore | Kenzie; The Underdogs; Daley; Whitmore | 3:20 |
| 5. | "View" | Jonghyun | LDN Noise; Jhun; McKinnon | LDN Noise; Jhun; McKinnon | 3:10 |
| 6. | "Romance" | Kim In-hyung; Minho^{[a]} | Öberg; Marcus; Karlström | Öberg; Marcus; Karlström | 3:36 |
| 7. | "Trigger" | Kenzie | Kenzie; Deez; Bell | Deez | 4:01 |
| 8. | "Farewell My Love" (이별의 길; Ibyeorui gil) | Jeon Ji-eun; Hwang; Kim Jeong-mi; Minho^{[a]} | Lee; Richard; Degeddingseze | 80hdmuzic | 4:00 |
| 9. | "An Ode to You" (너의 노래가 되어; Neoui noraega doeeo) | Kim Hyun-woo | Kim Hyun-woo; Kim Du-hyung | Park | 4:17 |
| 10. | "Hold You" | Kim Dong-hyun | Deez; Yip; Reeves; Romulus; McCullough; Kim Dong-hyun; Bumzu | Deez; The Stereotypes; Kim Dong-hyun; Bumzu | 3:38 |
| 11. | "Alive" | Kim Eana; MC Meta; Key^{[b]} | Mason; Thomas; Darius Logan; Dominique Logan | The Underdogs; Blaq Tuxedo | 3:05 |
| 12. | "Woof Woof" | Kim In-hyung | Simms; Watts; Drew; Barringer | Simms; DWB Music | 3:16 |
| 13. | "Chocolate" | Yankie; Jonghyun | Öberg; Simon Janlöv | Öberg; Janlöv | 4:12 |
| 14. | "Black Hole" | Jeon Gan-di | Albertsson; Öberg; Carlsson | Mussashi; Öberg; Carlsson | 2:52 |
| 15. | "An Encore" (재연; Jaeyeon) | Kim Jin-hwan | Kim Jin-hwan | Kim Jin-hwan | 4:04 |
| Total length: | | | | | 53:41 |

Notes

- ^{^[a]} Minho is credited for writing the song's rap.
- ^{^[b]} Key is credited for writing the song's rap.

== Charts ==
=== Odd ===
==== Weekly charts ====
| Chart (2015) | Peak position |
|---|---|
| Japanese Albums (Oricon) | 6 |
| South Korean Albums (Gaon) | 1 |
| Taiwan J-pop Albums (G-Music) | 4 |
| US World Albums (Billboard) | 1 |
| US Heatseekers Albums (Billboard) | 9 |

==== Monthly chart ====
| Chart (2015) | Position |
|---|---|
| South Korean Albums (Gaon) | 1 |

==== Year-end chart ====
| Chart (2015) | Position |
|---|---|
| South Korean Albums (Gaon) | 8 |

=== Married to the Music ===
==== Weekly charts ====
| Chart (2015) | Peak position |
|---|---|
| South Korean Albums (Gaon) | 1 |
| US World Albums (Billboard) | 5 |

==== Monthly chart ====
| Chart (2015) | Position |
|---|---|
| South Korean Albums (Gaon) | 2 |

==== Year-end chart ====
| Chart (2015) | Position |
|---|---|
| South Korean Albums (Gaon) | 28 |

== Release history ==
Release history and formats for Odd
| Region | Date | Format | Label | Ref. |
|---|---|---|---|---|
| South Korea | May 18, 2015 | CD; digital download; streaming | SM Entertainment; KT Music | |
| Various | May 18, 2015 | Digital download; streaming | SM Entertainment | |
| Taiwan | July 10, 2015 | CD; digital download; streaming | Avex Taiwan | |
