= Hard (Shinee album) =

- Digital cover

Studio album by Shinee
- Released: June 26, 2023
- Recorded: 2023
- Studios: Doobdoob (Seoul); SM Big Shot (Seoul); SM Blue Ocean (Seoul); SM Starlight (Seoul)
- Genres: Hip hop; R&B; electropop
- Length: 33:28
- Languages: Korean; English
- Labels: SM; Kakao
- Producers: Felix Back; Grant Boutin; J. Cumbee; Decz; Imlay; Ryan S. Jhun; Kenzie; Ludwig Lindell; LDN Noise; Dem Jointz; No2zcat; Robin Stjernberg

Shinee chronology
Superstar (2021)	Hard (2023)	Poet | Artist (2025)

Singles from Hard
- 1. "Hard" Released: June 26, 2023

Hard is the eighth Korean-language studio album by South Korean boy band Shinee. The album was released on June 26, 2023, through SM Entertainment. It was the group's first album since the youngest member, Taemin, completed his military service, and marked their 15th anniversary. It consists of ten songs of various genres, including the lead single, "Hard". The album was described as the start of a "new chapter" for the group, who sought to continually reinvent themselves and experiment with new genres. It was commercially successful, peaking at number two on South Korea's Circle Album Chart, and received largely positive reviews from music critics.

== Background ==
Shinee's youngest member, Taemin, enlisted in the military in May 2021, several months after the release of their seventh studio album, Don't Call Me. The remaining members, Onew, Key and Minho, focused on solo activities while they awaited his return. In January 2023, reports surfaced that they were planning to release their eighth album in May to celebrate their 15th anniversary, following the completion of Taemin's military duties. This was corroborated by an SM Entertainment earnings report the following month. Taemin was discharged from the military on April 4, 2023, and resumed idol activities, while Key confirmed that the group had begun recording. The album was delayed from its originally scheduled May release, and in an interview with Clash, Taemin expressed regret that they'd had limited time to prepare.

According to Onew, the album marked the beginning of a "new chapter" for the group. Their agency said that it would contain genres they had not explored before. For the lead single, Shinee decided to select hip hop song "Hard" over their agency's choice of "Juice" because they felt it would be a "new experience" for them. They expressed a desire to constantly seek a new identity and keep evolving.

== Composition ==
The album contains ten songs of various genres. Lead single "Hard" is a hip hop dance song, written by Kenzie, that incorporates boom bap, R&B and 90s hip hop. The lyrics contain the catchphrase "We go hard" and reflect Shinee's determination to face challenges without giving up and trust their own beliefs. "Juice" is a high tempo hip hop dance song with energetic rapping, a strong bassline and brass sounds. It is about falling in love with someone who enjoys life to the fullest, and carries the message of living with confidence and embracing each moment. The lyrics to the third song, "10X", express instinctive feelings towards another person. The track combines jazzy piano sounds with conga rhythms, tambourine and shakers. "Satellite" is an electropop song in which Shinee compare themselves to a satellite, unable to get closer to the object of their affections. The melody is driven by claves and pluck synths, mixing major and minor keys to create a "strange atmosphere". "Identity" is an uptempo dance song with a heavy funk bass, rough-textured synths and brass sounds. It is about the artist's determination to reveal their true identity, rather than keep it hidden. "The Feeling" belongs to the drum and bass genre, and includes a fast-paced breakbeat and bassline. Directed at fans, the lyrics contain messages to the people who have supported Shinee in the past, present and future. Dance-pop song "Like It" contains a repetitive synth line on top of a "cheerful" beat. It features rhythmical vocal lines and a falsetto chorus, while the lyrics use sensory expressions to describe attraction to another person. The album contains two breakup songs: "Sweet Misery" and "Insomnia". "Sweet Misery", an electropop song with synth sounds, reminisces about happy memories from before a breakup, while "Insomnia" describes the insomnia felt post-separation. It is a midtempo R&B hip hop song with guitar riffs, piano and vocal effects. The final song on the album, "Gravity", is a midtempo R&B song with minimalistic instrumentation and a lyrical melody. It expresses the feeling of missing a loved one.

== Release and promotion ==
On May 21, 2023, a billboard appeared in Seoul proclaiming that Shinee would return in June. They held a fan meeting event titled Everyday is Shinee Day: Piece of Shine on May 27–28 to commemorate their anniversary, where they previewed new song "The Feeling". The album was officially announced on June 1, with a confirmed release date of June 26. Pre-orders began the same day. On June 9, SM Entertainment announced that Onew would sit out of album promotions due to health issues. A music video for "The Feeling" premiered on YouTube on June 10 as an anniversary gift for fans. Shinee launched an interactive website where users could navigate through a 3D maze to discover hints about the album, including a schedule poster for their online content. Fans had to guess the website's URL using a "clue" poster released on their social media accounts. They also released a "mood sampler" video showing Shinee lost in a maze, followed by teaser images in the same setting. Ahead of the album's release, Shinee held a concert, Shinee World VI: Perfect Illumination, at the Olympic Gymnastics Arena in Seoul, where they performed the lead single for the first time.

To promote the album, Shinee guested on various variety and reality shows. They also performed lead single "Hard" and album track "Juice" on music programs such as M Countdown, Music Bank, Show! Music Core and Inkigayo. Key participated in promotions despite suffering from a wrist injury. Taemin appeared on Omniscient Interfering View alongside his manager, showcasing their close relationship and daily life. Minho and Taemin guested on DoReMi Market, where Key serves as a cast member. Shinee featured in their own reality show, Shinee's 15m, to commemorate their album release and anniversary. The program, which was broadcast by JTBC, showed Shinee going on a roadtrip and included performances of new songs. On July 3, they released a performance video of "Juice" on their YouTube account. They appeared on the web show MMTG, where they remastered their 2008 song "Amigo". They made an appearance on Music Universe K-909, where they performed "Gravity" for the first time and were interviewed by labelmate BoA.

== Critical reception ==
Professional ratings
Review scores
Source	Rating
NME	3/5 stars

Hard received mostly positive reviews from music critics. Writing for IZE, Lee Deok-haeng said that Shinee continued to challenge themselves with new genres while still maintaining their core identity. He viewed it as consistent with Shinee's history of musical experimentation, and concluded that by constantly reinventing themselves, they were able to still appear "youthful and energetic" fifteen years into their career. Kim Young-dae wrote that it felt like a greatest hits album despite being composed of entirely new songs, describing it as very "Shinee-like". He regarded it as the "highest level album that a K-pop boy group can present". Grant Rindner of i-D said that the album's "joyful organized chaos" delivered "a sense of both poignance and catharsis". He stated that it showed Shinee continued to push boundaries and maintain relevance despite the adversity they had endured. In a more mixed review, NME critic Rhian Daly described the album as "perfectly pleasant" but felt that it didn't live up to the standards set by their previous work. She deemed "Insomnia" and "Gravity" the most sonically interesting moments, and praised the overall quality of the lyrics, singling out "Identity" for its "impactful message".

Year-end lists for Hard
Critic/Publication	List	Rank	Ref.
Paste	The 20 Best K-pop Albums of 2023	20	

== Track listing ==
Hard track listing
No.	Title	Lyrics	Music	Arrangement	Length
1.	"Hard"	Kenzie	Kenzie; Andrew Choi; No2zcat	Kenzie; No2zcat	2:57
2.	"Juice"	Kenzie	Kenzie; Dwayne Abernathy Jr.; Adrian McKinnon	Dem Jointz	3:18
3.	"10X"	Lee Hyung-seok (PNP)	Andreas Öberg; Ninos Hanna; Felix Back; Rico Greene	Felix Back	3:42
4.	"Satellite"	Park Tae-won	Shari Short; Rollo; Josh Cumbee	Josh Cumbee	3:29
5.	"Identity"	Choi Ji-yoon (153/Joombas)	Jonathan Gusmark; Ludvig Evers; Emily Yeonseo Kim; Gabriel Brandes; Moa "Cazzi Opeia" Carlebecker	Moonshine	3:16
6.	"The Feeling"	Jo Yoon-kyung	Hayden Chapman; Greg Bonnick; Adrian McKinnon	LDN Noise; Imlay	3:54
7.	"Like It"	12h51m (Verygoods)	Ryan S. Jhun; Robin Stjernberg; Johan Lindbrandt; Daniel Shah; Jason Ok	Ryan S. Jhun; Robin Stjernberg; Johan Lindbrandt; Jason Ok	2:45
8.	"Sweet Misery"	Jo Yoon-kyung	Kella Armitage; Decz; Grant Boutin; Francis Karel	Decz; Grant Boutin	3:06
9.	"Insomnia" (불면증; Bulmyeonjeung)	Kim In-hyung (Jam Factory)	Josh Cumbee; JT Roach; Rollo	Josh Cumbee	3:47
10.	"Gravity"	Choi Ji-yoon (153/Joombas)	Ludwig Lindell; Distract; Junny; Aisle	Ludwig Lindell	3:17
Total length:					33:28

== Personnel ==
- Shinee – background vocals (tracks 1–3, 5–10)
- Kenzie – vocal directing (tracks 1–2)
- Andrew Choi – background vocals (track 1)
- Jeong Yu-ra – recording, digital editing (tracks 1, 3–4, 6–7), engineering for mix (track 1), mixing (tracks 3, 7)
- Kim Cheol-sun – mixing (tracks 1, 9), recording (track 8)
- Adrian McKinnon – background vocals (tracks 2, 6)
- Lee Min-gyu – digital editing (tracks 2, 5, 9–10), recording (track 5), mixing (tracks 5, 10), engineering for mix (track 10)
- Jeong Eui-seok – mixing (track 2)
- 1Take (Newtype) – vocal directing (track 3)
- Rico Greene – background vocals (track 3)
- MinGtion – vocal directing (tracks 4, 6)
- Shari Short – background vocals (track 4)
- Roland Spreckley a.k.a. Rollo – background vocals (track 4)
- Josh Cumbee – background vocals (track 4)
- Nam Gung-jin – mixing (track 4)
- Emily Yeonseo Kim – vocal directing (tracks 5, 8)
- Ju Chan-yang (Pollen) – background vocals (track 5), vocal directing (track 9)
- Gabriel Brandes – background vocals (track 5)
- Gu Jong-pil – mixing (tracks 6, 8)
- Kriz – vocal directing (track 7)
- Daniel Shah – background vocals (track 7)
- Woo Min-jeong – digital editing (track 7)
- No Min-ji – digital editing (track 8)
- JT Roach – background vocals (track 9)
- Kwon Yu-jin – digital editing (track 9)
- Kim Jin-hwan – vocal directing (track 10)
- Aisle – background vocals (track 10)
- Lee Jeong-bin – recording (track 10)
- Kwon Nam-woo – mastering

== Charts ==
=== Weekly charts ===
Weekly chart performance
Chart (2023)	Peak position
Japanese Albums (Oricon)	5
Japanese Combined Albums (Oricon)	4
Japanese Hot Albums (Billboard Japan)	3
South Korean Albums (Circle)	2
UK Album Downloads (Official Charts)	54

=== Monthly charts ===
Monthly chart performance
Chart (2023)	Position
Japanese Albums (Oricon)	11
South Korean Albums (Circle)	7

=== Year-end charts ===
Year-end chart performance
Chart (2023)	Position
Japanese Download Albums (Billboard Japan)	59
South Korean Albums (Circle)	71

== Certifications ==
Certifications
Region	Certification	Certified units/sales
South Korea (KMCA)	Platinum	250,000^{^}
^{^} Shipments figures based on certification alone.

== Accolades ==
Music program awards for "Hard"
Program	Date	Ref.
Show Champion	July 5, 2023	
Show Champion	July 12, 2023	
Music Bank	July 7, 2023	
Show! Music Core	July 8, 2023	
Inkigayo	July 9, 2023	

== Release history ==
Release history
Region	Date	Format	Label
South Korea	June 26, 2023	CD	SM; Kakao
Various	June 26, 2023	Digital download; streaming	SM
