= View (Shinee song) =

2015 song by Shinee

Single by Shinee

from the album Odd
- Language: Korean
- Released: May 18, 2015
- Studio: SM Blue Ocean (Seoul); SM Yellow Tail (Seoul); SM Blue Cup (Seoul)
- Genre: Deep house; pop
- Length: 3:10
- Label: SM Entertainment
- Composers: LDN Noise; Ryan S. Jhun; Adrian McKinnon
- Lyricist: Jonghyun

Shinee singles chronology
"Your Number" (2015)	"View" (2015)	"Married to the Music" (2015)

Music video
- "View" on YouTube

"View" is a song recorded by South Korean boy band Shinee for their fourth Korean-language studio album Odd (2015). Band member Jonghyun wrote the lyrics, while LDN Noise, Ryan S. Jhun, and Adrian McKinnon handled the composition and production. The song was released on May 18, 2015, as the album's lead single by SM Entertainment. The song incorporates deep house and pop, featuring stripped-down instrumentation. The lyrics are about how people's senses are intensified by love.

"View" received generally positive reviews from music critics, who regarded it as K-pop's first foray into deep house. In 2019, Billboard placed the song on its decade-end list of the greatest K-pop songs of the 2010s. It was nominated for Song of the Year at the 2015 Mnet Asian Music Awards. The song reached number one on the Gaon Digital Chart, and has sold over 724,000 digital copies in South Korea as of December 2015.

An accompanying music video was released to YouTube on May 19, 2015, and features Shinee going on an adventure with female fans and performing choreography to the song. To promote the song, the band performed "View" on several South Korean music programs, including Music Bank, Show! Music Core and Inkigayo.

== Music and lyrics ==
The lyrics of "View" were written by Shinee's lead vocalist Jonghyun. For the composition and arrangement, the band's label SM Entertainment enlisted British production duo LDN Noise, including Greg Bonnick and Hayden Chapman, who had previously written and produced songs for K-pop groups Red Velvet, Got7, and Shinhwa. South Korean composer Ryan S. Jhun and Adrian McKinnon are also credited as writers and arrangers of the song.

"View"
18-second sample of the pre-chorus and chorus

"View" is an uptempo 1990s-inspired deep house and pop song, a departure from the group's signature R&B sound. Some music critics have also characterized its sound as Italo house and UK garage. Regarding the choice of the genre, Jonghyun told Dazed, "On the musical side, deep house is a genre that's been developing internationally for a long time, but I think our song 'View' is the first song within K-pop to weave in that sound, and bring it to the masses. We wanted it to feel new and sophisticated." Ahead of its release, member Minho stated that he was worried how the new sound would be received by the audience.

"View" incorporates a light synth production and relies on stripped-down instrumentation. The chorus has a repetitive, saccharine structure and employs bass over Disclosure-esque beats, similar to the band's 2013 single, "Everybody". Having a sensual sound, the song portrays the beauty of love as a "mixture of diverse senses". In the lyrics, the group discuss how people's senses are intensified by love. The lyrics are noted for their use of synesthetic imagery.

== Critical reception ==
"View" received generally positive reviews from music critics who praised the group for experimenting with deep house and considered the song K-pop's first foray into the genre. Scott Interrante of PopMatters praised the song's production, writing that the house beat was "as infectious as any big pop hook despite its simplicity". Interante further wrote that "'View' floats along unpretentiously in a way that seems boring on first listen but which is increasingly appealing the more time you spend with it." Alexis Hodoyan-Gastelum of MTV described it as "a great, laid back summer jam" even though "the song fools us into thinking it's an uptempo ballad before reaching its techno peak at the chorus". IZM's Lee Ki-seon said that the song's production blended with the group's vocal performance and deemed "View" as an album highlight.

Billboard writer Jeff Benjamin lauded the track, saying, "By going against what's expected, Shinee actually ends up taking more of a risk by doing less and it pays off handsomely". In another review for the same magazine, Jessica Oak and Benjamin hailed it as "another ambitious release to add to the boy band's discography". Idolator listed "View" at number three on its list of "Best K-Pop Songs of 2015". On behalf of the publication, Peterson wrote: "'View' sounds like it was lifted straight out of a gay New York nightclub in the early nineties, which is about the highest possible praise one can give a record like this." Billboard also ranked it on the magazine's year-end list and as one of the greatest K-Pop songs of the 2010s.

=== Accolades ===
"View" achieved the top spot on various South Korean weekly music programs, winning nine music show awards. At the 2015 Mnet Asian Music Awards, the song received nominations for Song of the Year and Best Dance Performance – Male Group, winning the latter. It was also nominated for the Digital Bonsang at the 30th Golden Disc Awards.

Weekly music program awards
Program	Date	Ref.
Show Champion	May 27, 2015	
M Countdown	May 28, 2015	
M Countdown	June 4, 2015	
Music Bank	May 29, 2015	
Music Bank	June 5, 2015	
Show! Music Core	June 6, 2015	
Inkigayo	May 31, 2015	
Inkigayo	June 7, 2015	
The Show	June 9, 2015	

== Release and commercial performance ==
In May 2015, Shinee announced the release of their fourth Korean-language studio album, Odd. It marked their first Korean release in one and a half years since Everybody (2013). The band released the full track list on May 10, which revealed "View" as the third track on the album. In the lead-up to the release of "View", the group released photo and video teasers for the track, which served as a promotional tool for their return. Shinee premiered the song at their three-day concerts held at Seoul Olympic Park Gymnastics Gymnasium between May 15 and 17. It was released for digital download and streaming by SM Entertainment on May 18, 2015, the same day as the release of the album.

Upon release, the song debuted at number two on the Gaon Digital Chart on the chart issue dated May 23, 2015, and sold 180,319 digital units within its first week of release. The following week, it climbed to the number one spot, selling another 77,304 digital units. It was the fourth best-performing song on the Gaon Monthly Chart for May 2015, selling 267,582 downloads. As of December 2015, the song has sold over 724,659 digital units in South Korea, becoming the 78th best-selling single of 2015. Additionally, it became the 41st best-performing single on the Gaon Digital Chart of 2015, based on digital sales, streaming, and instrumental track downloads. "View" peaked at number two on the Billboard World Digital Song Sales chart.

== Promotion ==
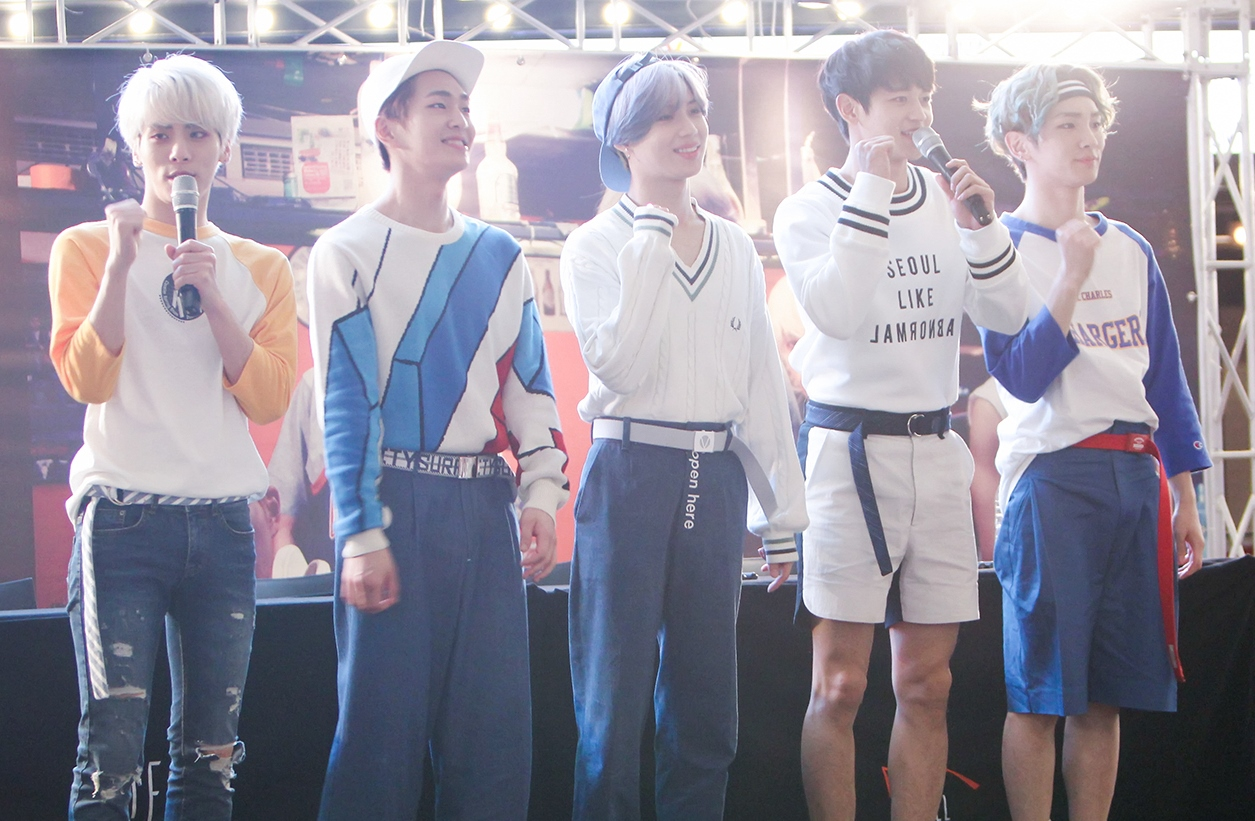
Shinee (pictured) at a promotional event for Odd in May 2015.

The music video for "View" was released to YouTube on May 19, 2015. It was directed by Shin Hee-won and was filmed in Thailand. For the video, choreography by American choreographer Ian Eastwood was commissioned. The visual utilizes a light, Instagram-like filter and shows the group performing before being kidnapped by a legion of female fans. The video is interspersed with scenes showing the members lifting beers from stores, using strangers' pools, and breaking into deserted warehouses to party with their fans. There are also a few scenes where they perform choreography to the song. According to Shinee, the fashion styles featured in the video were inspired by various retro trends.

Benjamin praised the video's fashion styles, writing that "the guys very well may boast the best fashion they've ever rocked in their K-pop videos too with fit muscle shirts and sportswear." Meanwhile, Taylor Glasby from Dazed interpreted the video as "creepy, fanfic-style". It was the most viewed music video on YouTube by a South Korean music act in May 2015. To promote the song and Odd, Shinee performed "View" on several South-Korean music programs, including KBS's Music Bank, MBC's Show! Music Core, and SBS' Inkigayo.

== Credits and personnel ==
Credits adapted from the liner notes of Odd.

Studio

- SM Blue Ocean Studio – recording
- SM Yellow Tail Studio – recording, mixing
- SM Blue Cup Studio – recording
- SM Big Shot Studio – digital editing
- JFS Mastering – mastering

Personnel

- Shinee – vocals, background vocals
  - Jonghyun – lyrics
- LDN Noise – composition, arrangement
- Ryan S. Jhun – composition, arrangement
- Adrian McKinnon – composition, arrangement
- Kim Jin-hwan – vocal directing
- Hitchhiker – vocal directing
- Kim Cheol-sun – recording
- Koo Jong-pil – recording, mixing
- Jung Eui-seok – recording
- Lee Min-kyu – recording, digital editing
- Seong Ji-hoon – mastering
