= Winter Wonderland (Shinee song) =

- Digital/Regular cover

Single by Shinee

from the album Five
- Language: Japanese
- B-side: "Melody"
- Released: 21 December 2016
- Genre: J-pop
- Length: 4:08
- Label: EMI
- Composers: Erik Lidbom; Takarot
- Lyricist: Hidenori Tanaka

Shinee singles chronology
"Tell Me What to Do" (2016)	"Winter Wonderland" (2016)	"Get the Treasure" (2017)

"Winter Wonderland" is a Japanese single by South Korean boy group Shinee. It was released on 21 December 2016. It reached number two on the weekly Oricon Singles Chart with 88,048 copies sold. It also reached third place on the Billboard Japan Hot 100.

== Track listing ==
No.	Title	Lyrics	Music	Length
1.	"Winter Wonderland"	Hidenori Tanaka	Erik Lidbom, Takarot	4:08
2.	"Melody"	Amon Hayashi	Didrik Thott, Peter Boyes, Josef Melin	4:14

== Chart performance ==
=== Oricon ===
Chart	Peak	Debut Sales	Sales Total
Weekly Singles Chart	2	88,048	95,517

=== Billboard Japan ===
Chart	Peak
Top Singles Sales	2
Japan Hot 100	3
