= List of Shinee live performances =

Shinee live performances
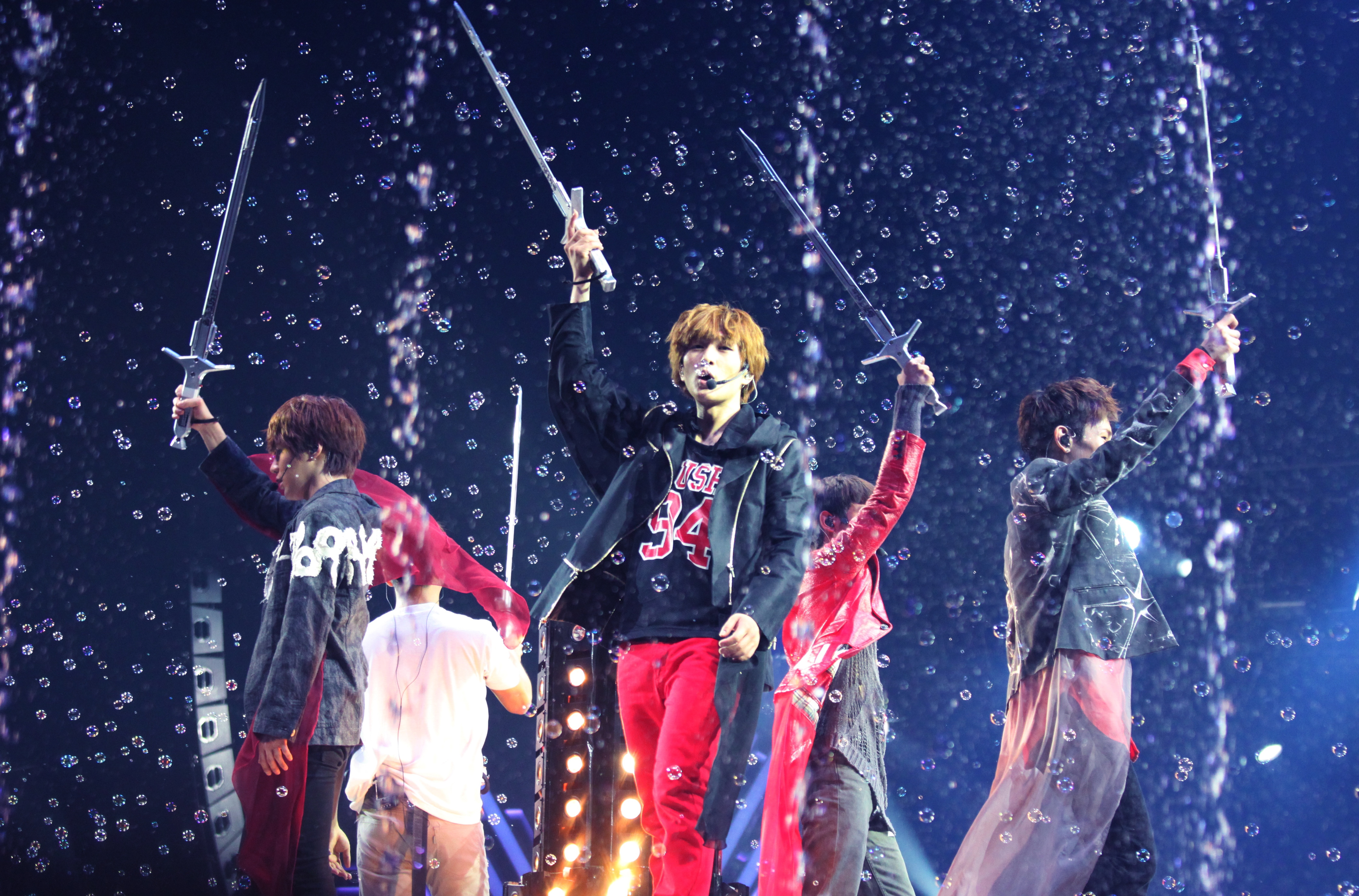
- Shinee performing at Shinee World II in Taiwan in 2012
- Concert tours: 12
- Concerts: 4
- Fan meetings: 16
- Showcases: 7
- Company tours: 8
- Festivals: 18
- Other performances: 45

South Korean boy band Shinee have headlined twelve concert tours, four concerts, sixteen fan meetings and seven showcases, and additionally participated in various SM Town tours, festivals and other performances. Debuting in 2008, they made early concert appearances at the 2008 Dream Concert and SM Town Live '08. They embarked on their first concert tour, Shinee World, in 2010, travelling to various locations across Asia. The following year, they performed at Abbey Road Studios in London, becoming the first Asian act do so, in anticipation of their Japanese debut. They later became the first Korean idol group to hold an independent concert in London, opening the 6th London Korean Film Festival.

In 2012, Shinee began their first Japanese arena tour, Shinee World 2012. The tour attracted 200,000 spectators, setting a new record for the debut Japanese tour of a Korean group. They embarked on their first world tour, Shinee World III, in 2014, with tour stops spanning Asia, North America and South America. Shinee World 2014 marked their first time performing at Tokyo Dome, one of the largest concert venues in Japan. They returned there the following year for Shinee World 2016, adding performances at Kyocera Dome Osaka. In 2017, their second world tour, Shinee World V, saw them travel to the United States and Canada for the first time, while their Japan tour, Shinee World 2017, attracted 430,000 spectators. Shinee held dome concerts for the fourth consecutive year under the name Shinee World the Best 2018. With this, their cumulative concert attendance in Japan reached 1.68 million people across 120 concerts.

== Tours ==
Title	Dates	Associated album(s)	Continent(s)	Shows	Attendance	Ref.
Shinee World	December 26, 2010 – November 25, 2011	The Shinee World; Lucifer	Asia	10	110,000	
Shinee World 2012	April 25, 2012 – July 1, 2012	The First	Asia	20	200,000	
Shinee World II	July 21, 2012 – December 8, 2012	Sherlock	Asia	6	—N/a	
Shinee World 2013	June 28, 2013 – December 25, 2013	Boys Meet U	Asia	15	220,000	
Shinee World III	March 8, 2014 – June 22, 2014	The Misconceptions of Us; Everybody	Asia; North America; South America	8	—N/a	
Shinee World 2014	September 28, 2014 – March 15, 2015	I'm Your Boy	Asia	32	300,000	
Shinee World IV	May 15, 2015 – October 25, 2015	Odd	Asia	6	—N/a	
Shinee World 2016	January 30, 2016 – May 19, 2016	D×D×D	Asia	20	350,000	
Shinee World V	September 2, 2016 – June 24, 2017	1 of 1	Asia; North America	14	—N/a	
Shinee World 2017	January 28, 2017 – September 24, 2017	Five	Asia	29	430,000	
Shinee World The Best 2018	February 17, 2018 – February 27, 2018	Shinee the Best from Now On	Asia	4	180,000	
Shinee World VI: Perfect Illumination	June 23, 2023 – May 26, 2024	Hard	Asia	18	—N/a	

== Concerts ==
Title	Date	City	Country	Venue	Attendance	Ref.
Shinee in Cambodia	February 23, 2010	Phnom Penh	Cambodia	Olympic Stadium	4,000	
Shinee in London	November 3, 2011	London	United Kingdom	Odeon West End	—N/a	
SM Town Week – The Wizard	December 21, 2013	Seoul	South Korea	Korea International Exhibition Center	—N/a	
Beyond Live – Shinee: Shinee World	April 4, 2021	Seoul	South Korea	—N/a	130,000 (Note: Online viewers)	
Shinee World VII: E.S.S.A.Y	May 23, 2025	Seoul	South Korea	Olympic Gymnastics Arena	32,000	
Shinee World VII: E.S.S.A.Y	May 24, 2025	Seoul	South Korea	Olympic Gymnastics Arena	32,000	
Shinee World VII: E.S.S.A.Y	May 25, 2025	Seoul	South Korea	Olympic Gymnastics Arena	32,000	
Shinee World VIII: The Invert	May 29, 2026	Seoul	South Korea	KSPO Dome	30,000	
Shinee World VIII: The Invert	May 30, 2026	Seoul	South Korea	KSPO Dome	30,000	
Shinee World VIII: The Invert	May 31, 2026	Seoul	South Korea	KSPO Dome	30,000	

== Fan meetings ==
Title	Date	City	Country	Venue	Attendance	Ref.
Shinee Japan 1st Mini Live & Fan Meeting	August 10, 2009	Tokyo	Japan	Nakano Sunplaza Hall	2,000	
Shinee Japan 2nd Mini Live & Fan Meeting	September 14, 2009	Osaka	Japan	Orix Theater	2,500	
Shinee Summer Meeting	September 19, 2009	Taipei	Taiwan	Breeze Center	1,500	
Hello the 1st Fan Party	November 7, 2010	Taipei	Taiwan	Taipei International Convention Center	3,500	
Hello the 1st Fan Party	November 22, 2010	Bangkok	Thailand	Royal Paragon Hall	—N/a	
Shinee World J Fanclub Event 2012	December 20, 2012	Osaka	Japan	Osaka-jō Hall	—N/a	
Shinee World J Fanclub Event 2012	December 24, 2012	Chiba	Japan	Makuhari Messe	—N/a	
Shinee Debut 5th Anniversary Special Party! Shinee Day	May 25, 2013	Seoul	South Korea	Hwajeong Tiger Dome	—N/a	
Shinee Festival Tour	August 4, 2013	Taipei	Taiwan	Taipei Nangang Exhibition Center	5,000	
Shinee Festival Tour	November 30, 2013	Shanghai	China	Shanghai Indoor Stadium	—N/a	
Shinee Festival Tour	January 18, 2014	Beijing	China	Beijing Olympic Sports Center Gymnasium	—N/a	
Shinee Festival Tour	January 26, 2014	Hong Kong	China	AsiaWorld–Expo	—N/a	
Shinee Debut 7th Anniversary Special Party! Shinee Day	May 24, 2015	Seoul	South Korea	Hwajeong Tiger Dome	—N/a	
Shinee World J Official Fanclub Event 2016 5th Anniversary Party	November 5, 2016	Kobe	Japan	World Memorial Hall	—N/a	
Shinee Debut 9th Anniversary Special Party! Shinee Day	May 21, 2017	Seoul	South Korea	Hwajeong Tiger Dome	—N/a	
Shinee Debut 10th Anniversary: Shinee Day	May 27, 2018	Seoul	South Korea	Hwajeong Tiger Dome	—N/a	
Shinee World J Presents: Shinee Special Fan Event in Tokyo Dome	July 26, 2018	Tokyo	Japan	Tokyo Dome	55,000	
Shinee Special Party – The Shining	September 1, 2018	Seoul	South Korea	Olympic Gymnastics Arena	—N/a	
Shinee Special Party – The Shining	September 2, 2018	Seoul	South Korea	Olympic Gymnastics Arena	—N/a	
Shinee World J Presents: Bistro de Shinee	May 23, 2021	Seoul	South Korea	—N/a	—N/a	
Shinee Debut 13th Anniversary Online Party: Shinee Day	May 25, 2021	Seoul	South Korea	—N/a	—N/a	
Everyday is Shinee Day: Piece of Shine	May 27, 2023	Seoul	South Korea	Jamsil Arena	—N/a	
Everyday is Shinee Day: Piece of Shine	May 28, 2023	Seoul	South Korea	Jamsil Arena	—N/a	

== Showcases ==
Title	Date	City	Country	Venue	Attendance	Ref.
Japan Debut Premium Reception	June 19, 2011	London	United Kingdom	Abbey Road Studios	—N/a	
Japan Debut Premium Reception	July 22, 2011	Fukuoka	Japan	IMS Hall	30,000	
Japan Debut Premium Reception	July 23, 2011	Kobe	Japan	Kobe Kokusai Hall	30,000	
Japan Debut Premium Reception	July 27, 2011	Tokyo	Japan	Nakano Sunplaza	30,000	
Japan Debut Premium Reception	July 28, 2011	Tokyo	Japan	Nakano Sunplaza	30,000	
Japan Debut Premium Reception	August 8, 2011	Sapporo	Japan	Sapporo Factory Hall	30,000	
Japan Debut Premium Reception	August 11, 2011	Nagoya	Japan	Aurora Hall	30,000	
Shinee Japan 1st Album The First Showcase Live	December 24, 2011	Tokyo	Japan	Tokyo International Forum	15,000	
Melon Premiere Shinee Music Spoiler	February 14, 2013	Seoul	South Korea	Olympus Hall	—N/a	
"Dream Girl" showcase	February 20, 2013	Seoul	South Korea	SK Olympic Handball Gymnasium	3,000	
"Boys Meet U" surprise performances	August 13, 2013	Tokyo	Japan	Akasaka Sacas	1,000	
"Boys Meet U" surprise performances	August 13, 2013	Tokyo	Japan	Yomiuriland	8,000	
"Boys Meet U" surprise performances	August 13, 2013	Tokyo	Japan	Shinjuku Plaza	5,000	
1 of 1 showcase	October 4, 2016	Seoul	South Korea	SM Town Coex Artium	—N/a	
The Ringtone: Shinee is Back	January 31, 2021	Seoul	South Korea	—N/a	—N/a	

== Company tours and concerts ==
Title	Dates	Continent(s)	Shows	Ref.
SM Town Live '08	August 15, 2008 – February 7, 2009	Asia	3	
SM Town Live '10 World Tour	August 21, 2010 – October 23, 2011	Asia; North America; Europe	11	
SM Town Live World Tour III	May 20, 2012 – October 27, 2013	Asia; North America	11	
SM Town Live World Tour IV	August 15, 2014 – July 26, 2015	Asia	9	
SM Town Live World Tour V	July 16, 2016 – August 14, 2016	Asia	4	
SM Town Live World Tour VI	July 8, 2017 – April 6, 2018	Asia	6	
SM Town Special Stage in Hong Kong	August 5, 2017	Asia	1	
SM Town Live 2018 in Osaka	July 28, 2018 – July 30, 2018	Asia	3	

== Festivals ==
Title	Date	City	Country	Venue	Ref.
Soulmate Summer Festival	July 26, 2008	Yongin	South Korea	Caribbean Bay	
13th Busan Sea Festival	August 1, 2008	Busan	South Korea	Haeundae Beach	
2008 Korea Music Festival	August 12, 2008	Sokcho	South Korea	Cheongcho Lake	
Hanwoo and Apple Festival	September 6, 2008	Jangsu	South Korea	Nongaesadang	
5th Asia Song Festival	October 3, 2008	Seoul	South Korea	Seoul World Cup Stadium	
Pattaya International Music Festival	March 21, 2009	Pattaya	Thailand	Pattaya Beach	
Korean Cultural Festival	November 27, 2009	Manila	Philippines	Cultural Center of the Philippines	
Springroove Tokyo	March 30, 2013	Chiba	Japan	Makuhari Messe	
A-Nation	September 1, 2013	Tokyo	Japan	Ajinomoto Stadium	
Gangnam Festival 2013	October 6, 2013	Seoul	South Korea	KEPCO Special Stage	
2015 Summer Universiade Eve Festival	July 2, 2015	Gwangju	South Korea	Chonnam National University Sports Center	
A-Nation	August 23, 2015	Osaka	Japan	Nagai Stadium	
Gangnam Festival 2016	September 30, 2016	Seoul	South Korea	—N/a	
Spectrum Dance Music Festival	October 1, 2016	Seoul	South Korea	Nanji Hangang Park	
2018 Korea Music Festival	August 2, 2018	Seoul	South Korea	Gocheok Sky Dome	
2023 Music Bank Global Festival	December 9, 2023	Saitama	Japan	Belluna Dome	
K-Link Festival 2023	December 10, 2023	Seoul	South Korea	Jamsil Arena	
Hangout with Yoo Grand Festival	June 13, 2024	Seoul	South Korea	Seoul Children's Grand Park	

== Other live performances ==
Title	Date	City	Country	Venue	Ref.
2008 Dream Concert	June 7, 2008	Seoul	South Korea	Seoul Olympic Stadium	
Chungmuro International Film Festival Opening Concert	September 2, 2008	Seoul	South Korea	Seoul Plaza	
One Meal Together Concert	September 19, 2008	Seoul	South Korea	Sungkyunkwan University	
2008 Love Life Concert	September 20, 2008	Bucheon	South Korea	Bucheon City Hall Plaza	
Reading Seoul Book Concert	October 21, 2008	Seoul	South Korea	Seoul Plaza	
We Love Bears Concert	November 1, 2008	Seongnam	South Korea	Bundang Central Park	
U-Clean Concert	November 1, 2008	Seoul	South Korea	Seoul Plaza	
2009 Incheon Korean Music Wave	September 5, 2009	Incheon	South Korea	Incheon Munhak Stadium	
Korea-Thailand Friendship Concert	September 17, 2009	Bangkok	Thailand	Park Paragon	
2009 Dream Concert	October 10, 2009	Seoul	South Korea	Seoul World Cup Stadium	
New Generation Live in Yokohama	April 24, 2010	Yokohama	Japan	Pacifico Yokohama National Convention Hall	
2010 Dream Concert	May 22, 2010	Seoul	South Korea	Seoul World Cup Stadium	
2010 Incheon Korean Music Wave	August 29, 2010	Incheon	South Korea	Incheon Munhak Stadium	
Korea Friendship Concert	January 12, 2011	Sydney	Australia	Sydney Town Hall	
Tokyo Legend 2011 – Korean Music Wave Live in Tokyo	May 14, 2011	Saitama	Japan	Saitama Super Arena	
2011 Dream Concert	May 28, 2011	Seoul	South Korea	Seoul World Cup Stadium	
2011 Incheon Korean Music Wave	August 13, 2011	Incheon	South Korea	Incheon Munhak Stadium	
2011 Hallyu Dream Concert	October 3, 2011	Gyeongju	South Korea	Gyeongju Civic Stadium	
K-pop Super Concert	October 28, 2011	Busan	South Korea	Gwangalli Beach	
Billboard Korea K-pop Masters	November 26, 2011	Las Vegas	United States	MGM Grand Garden Arena	
Music for All, All for One	December 25, 2011	Tokyo	Japan	Yoyogi National Gymnasium	
K-pop Nation Concert in Macau	July 2, 2012	Macau	China	Venetian Hotel	
Incheon K-pop Concert 2012	September 9, 2012	Incheon	South Korea	Incheon Munhak Stadium	
Happy Music Live 2012	November 10, 2012	Yokohama	Japan	Yokohama Arena	
K-pop Star College Entrance Exam Concert	November 18, 2012	Seoul	South Korea	Kyung Hee University	
Music for All, All for One	December 23, 2012	Tokyo	Japan	Yoyogi National Gymnasium	
M Countdown Nihao-Taiwan	April 24, 2013	Taipei	Taiwan	Taipei Arena	
2013 Dream Concert	May 11, 2013	Seoul	South Korea	Seoul World Cup Stadium	
Mezamashi Live	August 12, 2013	Tokyo	Japan	United States Open Summer Stadium	
KBS Open Concert (LA K-pop Festival)	April 12, 2014	Los Angeles	United States	Los Angeles Memorial Coliseum	
Tokyo Girls Collection	September 6, 2014	Saitama	Japan	Saitama Super Arena	
2015 Dream Concert	May 23, 2015	Seoul	South Korea	Seoul World Cup Stadium	
2015 Summer Universiade closing ceremony	July 14, 2015	Gwangju	South Korea	Gwangju World Cup Stadium	
New Start 2015	September 12, 2015	Seoul	South Korea	Hwajeong Tiger Dome	
2015 Hallyu Dream Concert	September 20, 2015	Gyeongju	South Korea	Gyeongju Civic Stadium	
GirlsAward	October 24, 2015	Tokyo	Japan	Yoyogi National Gymnasium	
Super Concert "The Show"	October 28, 2015	Saitama	Japan	Saitama Super Arena	
K-pop Concert in Prague	December 4, 2015	Prague	Czech Republic	Královka Arena	
KCON	June 2, 2016	Paris	France	Accor Arena	
KCON	July 30, 2016	Los Angeles	United States	Staples Center	
Incheon K-pop Concert 2016	September 24, 2016	Incheon	South Korea	Incheon Munhak Stadium	
2016 Super Seoul Dream Concert	November 27, 2016	Seoul	South Korea	Gocheok Sky Dome	
OneK Global Peace Concert	March 2, 2017	Manila	Philippines	SM Mall of Asia Arena	
Kpop Lux SBS Super Concert	July 22, 2023	Madrid	Spain	Metropolitano Stadium	
The MusiQuest	August 26, 2023	Chiba	Japan	Makuhari Messe	
SBS Gayo Daejeon	December 25, 2023	Incheon	South Korea	Inspire Resort Arena	
