= Shinee World VI: Perfect Illumination =

2023–2024 concert tour by Shinee

- Tour by Shinee
- Location: Asia
- Associated album: Hard
- Start date: June 23, 2023
- End date: May 26, 2024
- No. of shows: 18

Shinee concert chronology
- Beyond Live – Shinee: Shinee World (2021); Shinee World VI: Perfect Illumination (2023–2024)

Shinee World VI: Perfect Illumination is the sixth concert tour by South Korean boy band Shinee. It began on June 23, 2023, at the Olympic Gymnastics Arena in Seoul, and continued on to Japan later in the year. The tour is Shinee's first in several years, after a hiatus brought on by mandatory military service and the COVID-19 pandemic. It has been well received by critics, who have praised Shinee's live singing and performance skills, and was awarded Stage of the Year at the 2023 Melon Music Awards.

== Background ==
Due to military service and the COVID-19 pandemic, Shinee had not held an in-person concert in South Korea since 2016, though they had staged concerts in Japan in 2018 and an online concert using the Beyond Live platform in 2021. Taemin became the final member of the group to complete his military service in April 2023, bringing their hiatus to an end. The group's sixth Korean concert, Shinee World VI: Perfect Illumination, was announced soon afterwards, taking place over three days at the Olympic Gymnastics Arena in Seoul. Tickets went on sale for members of Shinee's fan club on June 5, and opened to the general public on June 8. Onew was forced to withdraw from the Seoul dates due to health issues. The concert was directed by Hwang Sang-hoon and themed around light. Shinee performed songs from their new album, Hard, which was released the day after the concerts concluded and was intended to commemorate the group's 15th anniversary. The final show was streamed online through Beyond Live and was viewed in 94 countries.

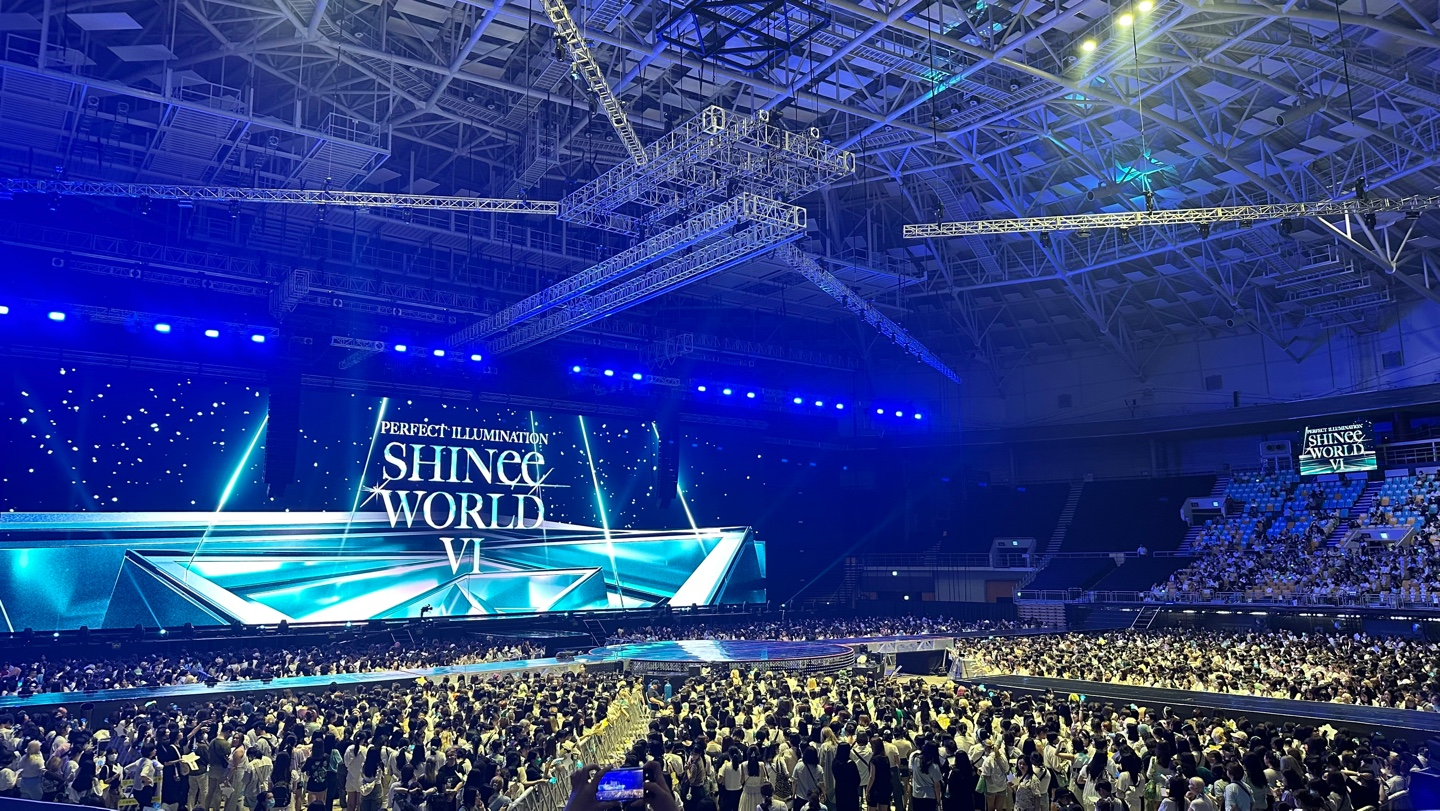
View of the stage at the KSPO Dome in Seoul

On June 26, it was announced that Shinee would continue their tour in Japan from September, covering four cities. Onew was again unable to participate. Their Japan tour closed with two performances at Tokyo Dome in February 2024. They held further concerts in Singapore, their first since 2012, and Hong Kong. Shinee held encore performances at Inspire Arena in Incheon to mark their 16th anniversary, featuring the return of Onew after a year's hiatus.

== Critical reception ==
The tour was met with positive reviews from critics. Writing for The Korea Times, Jung Da-hyun praised both the quality of Shinee's "mesmerizing" performances and the stage production, drawing attention to the use of lighting effects and laser beams. Hong Yoo of The Korea Herald lauded Shinee's "commanding presence" and "remarkable teamwork". He considered their performance of "An Encore" to be the highlight of the show, stating that it proved "that they are just as good singers as they are performers". Eoh Hwan-hee of The JoongAng said that Shinee transcended the usual idol group role divisions of vocalist, rapper and dancer, stating that even Minho, the rapper of the group, proved himself a capable vocalist during the ballad numbers. Newsis reporter Lee Jae-hoon felt that Shinee were still able to deliver strong performances despite the absence of Onew and their late bandmate Jonghyun, who died in 2017, living up to their reputation for excellent live singing. This was echoed by Lim Ji-woo of Yonhap News Agency, who commended Shinee's passion and energy on stage. Shinee were awarded Stage of the Year at the 2023 Melon Music Awards in recognition of the tour.

== Set list ==
This set list is representative of the show on November 29, 2023. It does not represent all concerts for the duration of the tour.

1. "Chemistry"
2. "Dream Girl"
3. "Heart Attack"
4. "Like It"
5. "Atlantis"
6. "Sweet Misery"
7. "Code"
8. "Good Evening"
9. "Don't Call Me"
10. "Body Rhythm"
11. "Juice"
12. "Everybody"
13. "View"
14. "Downtown Baby"
15. "The Feeling"
16. "Replay"
17. "Love Like Oxygen"
18. "Diamond Sky"
19. "Kind"
20. "Selene 6.23"
21. "An Ode to You"
22. "An Encore"

Encore

23. "Hard"
24. "Hitchhiking"
25. "Runaway"

== Shows ==
List of concerts, showing date, city, country, venue, and attendance
| Date | City | Country | Venue | Attendance |
|---|---|---|---|---|
| June 23, 2023 | Seoul | South Korea | KSPO Dome | 30,000 |
| June 24, 2023 | Seoul | South Korea | KSPO Dome | 30,000 |
| June 25, 2023 | Seoul | South Korea | KSPO Dome | 30,000 |
| September 30, 2023 | Saitama | Japan | Saitama Super Arena | 80,000 |
| October 1, 2023 | Saitama | Japan | Saitama Super Arena | 80,000 |
| October 6, 2023 | Osaka | Japan | Osaka-jō Hall | 80,000 |
| October 7, 2023 | Osaka | Japan | Osaka-jō Hall | 80,000 |
| November 22, 2023 | Nagoya | Japan | Nippon Gaishi Hall | 80,000 |
| November 23, 2023 | Nagoya | Japan | Nippon Gaishi Hall | 80,000 |
| November 28, 2023 | Tokyo | Japan | Yoyogi National Gymnasium | 80,000 |
| November 29, 2023 | Tokyo | Japan | Yoyogi National Gymnasium | 80,000 |
| February 24, 2024 | Tokyo | Japan | Tokyo Dome | 100,000 |
| February 25, 2024 | Tokyo | Japan | Tokyo Dome | 100,000 |
| March 2, 2024 | Singapore | | Singapore Indoor Stadium | 10,000 |
| March 16, 2024 | Hong Kong | China | AsiaWorld-Arena | 12,000 |
| May 24, 2024 | Incheon | South Korea | Inspire Arena | 30,000 |
| May 25, 2024 | Incheon | South Korea | Inspire Arena | 30,000 |
| May 26, 2024 | Incheon | South Korea | Inspire Arena | 30,000 |
