= Chu Ga-yeoul =

South Korean singer

Chu Ga-yeoul 추가열
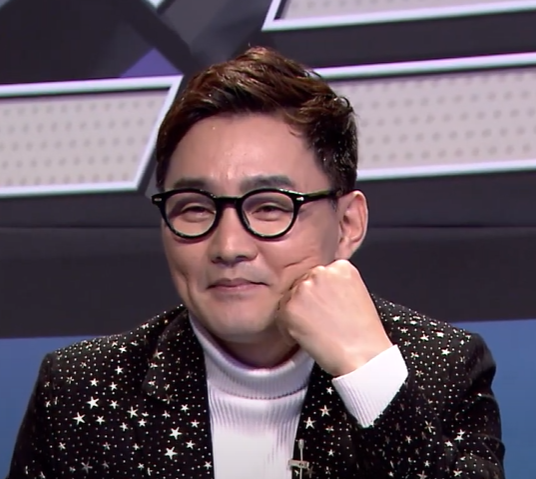
- Chu in 2021

Background information
- Birth name: Chu Eun-yul
- Also known as: Chu Ga-yeoul
- Born: July 11, 1968 (age 57); Boryeong, Chungcheongnam-do, South Korea
- Genres: Folk; Ballad
- Occupation: Singer-songwriter
- Instrument: Guitar
- Years active: 1986–present
- Labels: SM; REAL (烈); HK Enterpro
- Formerly of: SM Town
- Website: Chu Ga-yeoul

- Chu Ga-yeoul
- Hangul: 추은열
- RR: Chu Eunyeol
- MR: Ch'u Ŭnyŏl

Stage name
- Hangul: 추가열
- RR: Chu Gayeol
- MR: Ch'u Kayŏl

Chu Eun-yul (born July 11, 1968), better known as Chu Ga-yeoul, is a South Korean folk-pop singer and songwriter. He's known for his guitar skills and his most famous single, "Don't Go Away".

== Career ==
Chu auditioned at SM in 2001 and received a standing ovation by Lee Soo Man. He signed with them that year. Born Chu Eun Yul, Chu was given his stage name, "Chu Ga Yeol", by Lee Soo Man. Lee even said that Chu's stage name was better than H.O.T.'s.

Chu taught Super Junior's Sungmin the guitar. On the radio show Ahn SeonYoung's Radio Is Good on May 19, Chu Ga Yeol said "Among the hoobaes of Super Junior that I taught how to play the guitar, Sungmin is the one who learnt to play well right away. To see a hoobae like Sungmin’s improvement in guitar skill, I feel so proud and it's very rewarding." Sungmin had previously said to Chu "If there are chances, I want to play the guitar on stage with you." The two would later perform a cover of "Just The Two Of Us" at SMTown Live '08 and Chu Ga Yeol's X-Mas Concert.

== Discography ==
=== Albums ===
Album information	Track listing
Vol. 1 Don't Go Away; Vol. 1 나 같은건 없는 건가요: Release Date: August 29, 2002	Track listing: 1. 좋은 사람 만날 거예요 (Tears in My Eyes); 2. Love Letter; 3. 나 같은 건 없는 건가요 (Don't Go Away); 4. 지켜보면서 (Stay With You); 5. 슬픈사랑 (Sad Love); 6. 이별 후에 (Come Back, Again); 7. Love Is...; 8. 여행 (Get Away); 9. 새 (Bird); 10. 평화 (Peace); 11. 나 같은 건 없는 건가요 (Don't Go Away – Violin); 12. 나 같은 건 없는 건가요 (Don't Go Away – Instrumental); 13. 나 같은 건 없는 건가요 (Don't Go Away – Remix)
Vol. 1.5 Aemo; Vol. 1.5 愛慕: Release Date: July 27, 2004	Track listing: 1. Prologue; 2. 너를 품에 안고... (You in His Arms...); 3. 애모 (A Boy); 4. 10월의 신부 (October Bride); 5. 다시 내게 (Me Again); 6. 너를 위한 이별 (For Your Parting); 7. 하늘 위에서 (Heaven Above); 8. 아름다운 세상으로 (Beautiful World); 9. Ain't No Sunshine; 10. 거꾸로 가는 사나이 (A Man Going Backwards); 11. 너를 품에 안고 (Instrumental) (You in His Arms... – Instrumental); 12. 10월의 신부 (Instrumental) (October Bride – Instrumental)
Vol. 2 There's So Much I Want To Say; Vol. 2 할말이 너무 많아요: Release Date: February 2, 2007	Track listing: 1. 나 같은 건 없는 건가요 (Piano Prologue) (Don't Go Away); 2. 위로 (Comfort); 3. 할말이 너무 많아요 (Something To Tell You); 4. 남편에게 (For My Husband); 5. 아내에게 바치는 노래 (For My Wife); 6. 고백 (Confession); 7. 좋은 님께 (To Mr. Personality); 8. 슬픈 사랑 (Sad Love); 9. 아내라는 이름으로 (For the Name of Wife); 10. 나의 천사 (My Angel); 11. 행복 찾기 (Being Happy); 12. I Love Hoya; 13. 할말이 너무 많아요 (Instrumental) (Something To Tell You – Instrumental)
Vol. 3 There Are Different Ways to Happiness: Release Date: March 26, 2009	Track listing: 1. 에델바이스 (Edelweiss); 2. 너때문에 (Because Of You); 3. River; 4. 마중 featuring 박미선 (Pick featuring Park Mi-sun); 5. 희망 (Hope); 6. 행복해요 featuring 재호 & 재윤 (I'm Happy featuring 재호 & 재윤); 7. 백만송이장미 (One Million Roses); 8. 코스모스피어있는길 (Blossomed Cosmos Road); 9. 나 같은 건 없는 건가요 (Don't Go Away); 10. 슬픈사랑 (Sad Love); 11. 할말을하지못했죠(I Didn't Say); 12. 하늘눈물 (Heaven Tears); 13. 갈대소리 (Reed Sound); 14. Just When I Needed You Most Bonus: 15. 나 같은 건 없는 건가요 (Don't Go Away -Original Version-); 16. 할 말이 너무 많아요 (Something To Tell You -Original Version-); 17. When Snow Scatters... [ 2007 Winter SMTown – Only Love ]
Vol. 4 Rainbow: Release Date: June 23, 2011	Track listing: 1. 희망 (Hope); 2. 너를 잊지 않을게 (I'll Never Forget You); 3. 꿈 (Dream); 4. 사랑이 그러할지라도 (Nevertheless It's Love); 5. 사랑해요 (I Love You); 6. 에델바이스 (Edelweiss); 7. 나 같은 건 없는 건가요 (Don't Go Away −2011 Version-); 8. 행복해요 featuring 재호 & 재윤 (I'm Happy featuring 재호 & 재윤); 9. 슬픈사랑 (Sadnes); 10. River featuring Park Hak Ki & Park Seung-wha (Yurisangja)
Vol. 5 Be Renewed: Release Date: October 24, 2012	Track listing: 1. Prayer; 2. Let's Go; 3. 어머니 (Mother); 4. Home; 5. Atriple; 6. 에델바이스 (Edelweiss); 7. 헤레나 (Helena); 8. 뿌리가 나무에게 (To The Roots of a Tree); 9. You're My Best Friend; 10. Just the Two of Us

=== Digital Singles ===
Album information	Track listing
Heaven Tears (Digital Single) 하늘눈물 (Digital Single): Release Date: March 10, 2008	Track listing: 1. 하늘눈물 (Heaven Tears); 2. 하늘눈물 (Instrumental) (Heaven Tears – Instrumental)

=== Other ===
Year	Title	Album	Notes
2002	"The Winter"	2002 Winter Vacation in SMTown.com – My Angel My Light	"그 해 겨울"
2003	"Dream of Memory"	2003 Summer Vacation in SMTown.com	"기억속의 꿈"
2004	"Rainy Day"	2004 Summer Vacation in SMTown.com	
2006	"You Go Away On The Road"	Hyena OST	"그대 떠나가는 길에"
2006	"I Love Hoya"	2006 Winter SMTown – Snow Dream	
2007	"For Love"	Grasshopper (베짱이)	"사랑을 위한"; Featuring artist; In Seong Yong (인성용) track
2007	"When Snow Scatters..."	2007 Winter SMTown – Only Love	"눈꽃이 날리면"
2008	"Just The Two Of Us featuring Sungmin"		Bill Withers cover; Performed live at SMTown Live '08 and Chu Ga Yeol X-Mas Concert
2009	"I Want To Love"	Waterdrop Necktie, I Want To Love, Ring Disadvantage	"사랑하고 싶어요"; Featuring artist; Hyun Sook track
2012	"Don't Go Away"	SM Best Album 3	
2012	"Something To Tell You"	SM Best Album 3	

== Music videos ==
Year	Title	Album	Remarks
2002	"Don't Go Away" Ver. 1	Vol. 1 Don't Go Away	sment on YouTube
2002	"Don't Go Away" Ver. 2	Vol. 1 Don't Go Away	sment on YouTube
2007	"Something To Tell You" (할말이 너무 많아요)	Vol. 2 There's So Much I Want To Say	sment on YouTube
2008	"Heaven Tears"	Heaven Tears (Digital Single)	

== Concerts ==
=== Headlining ===
- Chu Ga Yeol's X-Mas Concert – Sookmyung Art Center, Seoul (December 24 & 25, 2009)

=== Joint venture ===
- SMTown Live '08 – Seoul, South Korea (August 15, 2008)
- SMTown Live World Tour III – Seoul, South Korea (August 18, 2012)
- 2013 Good Friends Concert – Goyang, South Korea (January 12, 2013)
