= Shinee World V =

2016–17 concert tour by Shinee

- World tour by Shinee
- Location: Asia, North America
- Associated album: 1 of 1
- Start date: September 2, 2016
- End date: June 24, 2017
- No. of shows: 14

Shinee concert chronology
- Shinee World IV (2015); Shinee World V (2016–2017); Shinee World 2017 (2017)

Shinee World V (promoted as SHINee Concert "SHINee World V") is the fifth concert tour by South Korean boy group Shinee. The tour kicked off in Seoul with three concerts held between September 2–4, 2016.

== History ==
SM Entertainment confirmed on July 22, 2016, that Shinee would be kicking off their fifth concert tour, Shinee World V, in September 2016. Originally, there were to be two concerts held on September 3 and 4 at the Olympic Gymnastics Arena in Seoul, but a third was added for September 2 after heavy demand for ticketing. All tickets for the first two shows sold out in under five minutes. The set list for the concert focused on songs both old and new, and featured the first performances of four songs from their fifth album, 1 of 1. The songs included were "Prism", "Feel Good", "Don't Let Me Go" and "So Amazing". They also previewed the dance and a sound sample of their promotional title track, "1 of 1". During the September 4 concert, member Onew sprained his ankle during a performance which led to Shinee's comeback being delayed by a few weeks. The three concerts drew in an estimated 30,000 fans.

On September 30, it was confirmed that Shinee would be holding three concerts in Yokohama, Japan, at Yokohama Arena between December 9–11. This marked the first time that a concert was held in Japan outside of their arena tours since their first solo concert tour in 2010, Shinee World. The concerts drew in an estimated 45,000 fans. In March 2017, Shinee travelled to North America for their first solo concerts on the continent. They held two concerts in Toronto and Vancouver, followed by further shows in Dallas and Los Angeles. The US performances each drew a "full house" with each stop drawing in crowds of over 6,000. Shinee held a concert in Hong Kong on May 20. This marked their first time performing a solo concert in Hong Kong since their second concert tour in 2012, Shinee World II. They held another concert in Bangkok on June 24, 2017, at Thunder Dome MuangThong Thani. It was the last concert stop for Shinee World V.

== Set list ==
South Korea
1. "Hitchhiking" (히치하이킹)
2. "Married to the Music"
3. "Why So Serious?"
4. "Juliette"
5. "Prism"
6. "Replay" (누난 너무 예뻐)
7. "Chocolate"
8. "Black Hole"
9. "Odd Eye"
10. "Hold You"
11. "Feel Good"
12. "Alive"
13. "Trigger"
14. "Sherlock (Clue + Note)"
15. "Goodbye" (Taemin solo)
16. "Ring Ding Dong"
17. "Lucifer"
18. "Farewell My Love" (이별의 길)
19. "Aside"
20. "Don't Let Me Go" (투명 우산)
21. "Please Don't Go" (잠꼬대) (Onew and Jonghyun)
22. "Punch Drunk Love"
23. "Dream Girl"
24. "So Amazing"
25. "Colorful"
26. "View"
27. "Picasso" (Korean ver.)
28. "Ready or Not"
29. "Savior"
30. "Everybody"
31. "Lucky Star" (Korean ver.)
32. "An Encore" (재연)
33. "Romeo + Juliette" (소년, 소녀를 만나다)
Indonesia
1. "Hitchhiking" (히치하이킹)
2. "Married to the Music"
3. "Why So Serious?"
4. "Juliette"
5. "Prism"
6. "Replay" (누난 너무 예뻐)
7. "Black Hole"
8. "Odd Eye"
9. "Feel Good"
10. "Alive"
11. "Trigger"
12. "Goodbye" (Taemin solo)
13. "Ring Ding Dong"
14. "Lucifer"
15. "Farewell My Love" (이별의 길)
16. "Aside"
17. "Don't Let Me Go" (투명 우산)
18. "Please Don't Go" (잠꼬대) (Onew and Jonghyun)
19. "Punch Drunk Love"
20. "Dream Girl"
21. "So Amazing"
22. "View"
23. "Ready or Not"
24. "Savior"
25. "Everybody"
26. "1 of 1"
27. "Lucky Star" (Korean ver.)
28. "An Encore" (재연)
29. "Romeo + Juliette" (소년, 소녀를 만나다)
Japan
1. "Hitchhiking" (히치하이킹)
2. "Married to the Music"
3. "Why So Serious?"
4. "Juliette"
5. "Prism"
6. "Replay" (누난 너무 예뻐)
7. "Chocolate"
8. "Black Hole"
9. "Odd Eye"
10. "Hold You"
11. "Feel Good"
12. "Alive"
13. "Trigger"
14. "Sherlock (Clue + Note)"
15. "Goodbye" (Taemin solo)
16. "Ring Ding Dong"
17. "Lucifer"
18. "Farewell My Love" (이별의 길)
19. "Aside"
20. "Don't Let Me Go" (투명 우산)
21. "Please Don't Go" (잠꼬대) (Onew and Jonghyun)
22. "Punch Drunk Love"
23. "Dream Girl"
24. "So Amazing"
25. "Colorful"
26. "View"
27. "Picasso" (Korean ver.)
28. "Ready or Not"
29. "Savior"
30. "Everybody"
31. "1 of 1"
32. "Lucky Star" (Korean ver.)
33. "An Encore" (재연)
34. "Romeo + Juliette" (소년, 소녀를 만나다)
North America
1. "Hitchhiking" (히치하이킹)
2. "Why So Serious?"
3. "Juliette"
4. "Prism"
5. "Replay" (누난 너무 예뻐)
6. "Hello"
7. "Odd Eye"
8. "Feel Good"
9. "Sherlock (Clue + Note)"
10. "Goodbye" (Taemin solo)
11. "Ring Ding Dong"
12. "Lucifer"
13. "Selene 6.23"
14. "Aside"
15. "Don't Let Me Go" (투명 우산)
16. "Please Don't Go" (잠꼬대) (Onew and Jonghyun)
17. "View"
18. "Ready or Not"
19. "Savior"
20. "Everybody"
21. "1 of 1"
22. "Dream Girl"
23. "An Encore" (재연)
Hong Kong
1. "Hitchhiking" (히치하이킹)
2. "Married to the Music"
3. "Why So Serious?"
4. "Juliette"
5. "Prism"
6. "Replay" (누난 너무 예뻐)
7. "Chocolate"
8. "Black Hole"
9. "Odd Eye"
10. "Feel Good"
11. "Trigger"
12. "Sherlock (Clue + Note)"
13. "Goodbye" (Taemin solo)
14. "Ring Ding Dong"
15. "Lucifer"
16. "Farewell My Love" (이별의 길)
17. "Aside"
18. "Don't Let Me Go" (투명 우산)
19. "Please Don't Go" (잠꼬대) (Onew and Jonghyun)
20. "View"
21. "Ready or Not"
22. "Savior"
23. "Everybody"
24. "1 of 1"
25. "Dream Girl"
26. "So Amazing"
27. "An Encore" (재연)
Thailand
1. "Hitchhiking" (히치하이킹)
2. "Married to the Music"
3. "Why So Serious?"
4. "Juliette"
5. "Prism"
6. "Replay" (누난 너무 예뻐)
7. "Black Hole"
8. "Odd Eye"
9. "Feel Good"
10. "Trigger"
11. "Sherlock (Clue + Note)"
12. "Goodbye" (Taemin solo)
13. "Ring Ding Dong"
14. "Lucifer"
15. "Farewell My Love" (이별의 길)
16. "Aside"
17. "Don't Let Me Go" (투명 우산)
18. "Please Don't Go" (잠꼬대) (Onew and Jonghyun)
19. "View"
20. "Ready or Not"
21. "Savior"
22. "Everybody"
23. "1 of 1"
24. "Dream Girl"
25. "So Amazing"
26. "An Encore" (재연)

== Schedule ==
List of concerts, showing date, city, country, venue, and attendance
Date	City	Country	Venue	Attendance
September 2, 2016	Seoul	South Korea	Olympic Gymnastics Arena	30,000
September 3, 2016	Seoul	South Korea	Olympic Gymnastics Arena	30,000
September 4, 2016	Seoul	South Korea	Olympic Gymnastics Arena	30,000
November 12, 2016	Jakarta	Indonesia	Jakarta International Expo	—
December 9, 2016	Yokohama	Japan	Yokohama Arena	45,000
December 10, 2016	Yokohama	Japan	Yokohama Arena	45,000
December 11, 2016	Yokohama	Japan	Yokohama Arena	45,000
March 19, 2017	Toronto	Canada	Sony Centre for the Performing Arts	—
March 21, 2017	Vancouver	Canada	The Orpheum	—
March 24, 2017	Dallas	United States	Verizon Theatre	6,000
March 26, 2017	Los Angeles	United States	Shrine Auditorium	6,000
May 20, 2017	Hong Kong	China	AsiaWorld–Arena	—
June 11, 2017	New Taipei City	Taiwan	Xinzhuang Gymnasium	—
June 24, 2017	Bangkok	Thailand	Thunder Dome	—
