= Shinee World 2017 =

2017 concert tour by Shinee

- Japan tour by Shinee
- Location: Japan
- Associated album: Five
- Start date: January 28, 2017
- End date: September 24, 2017
- No. of shows: 29

Shinee concert chronology
- Shinee World V (2016–2017); Shinee World 2017 (2017); Shinee World the Best 2018 (2018)

Shinee World 2017 (promoted as "SHINee WORLD 2017～FIVE～") was the fifth Japan nationwide concert tour by South Korean boy band Shinee, to promote their fifth Japanese studio album Five. The initial arena tour kicked off in Fukui on January 28, 2017, and ended in Tokyo on April 30, 2017, with a total of 25 concerts in 10 cities. It attracted a total of 250,000 fans. On June 22, 2017, concerts for SHINee WORLD 2017 ~FIVE~ Special Edition in Tokyo Dome and Osaka Dome were announced on Shinee's official Japanese website for September 2–3 and September 23–24, respectively. Onew decided not to participate in the dome concerts after facing sexual harassment allegations. With the addition of the dome concerts, the tour wrapped up with a total of 29 shows and a total attendance of 430,000. This was their last tour with member Jonghyun who died on December 18, 2017.

== Set list ==
Arena tour set list
1. "Gentleman"
2. "Picasso"
3. "JoJo" (Japanese ver.)
4. "Breaking News"
5. "Get the Treasure"
6. "Lucifer" (Japanese ver.)
7. "Do Me Right"
8. "Dream Girl"
9. "Kimi no Seide" (君のせいで)
10. "1 of 1"
11. "Mr. Right Guy"
12. Unplugged medley ("Juliette" / "Love Like Oxygen" / "Hello" / "Downtown Baby")
13. "Melody"
14. "Your Number" / "Replay" (Japanese remix ver.)
15. "Sweet Surprise"
16. "View" (Japanese ver.)
17. "Become Undone"
18. "Sherlock"
19. "ABOAB"
20. "Nothing to Lose"
21. "Married to the Music" (Japanese ver.)

Encore

22. "Everybody" (Japanese ver.)
23. "Stand By Me" (Japanese ver.)
24. "Diamond Sky"
25. "Winter Wonderland"
Dome tour set list
1. "Gentleman"
2. "Picasso"
3. "JoJo" (Japanese ver.)
4. "Breaking News"
5. "Get the Treasure"
6. "Lucifer" (Japanese ver.)
7. "Step By Step"
8. "Do Me Right"
9. "Kimi no Seide" (君のせいで)
10. "1 of 1" (Japanese ver.)
11. Unplugged medley ("Juliette" / "Love Like Oxygen" / "Hello" / "Downtown Baby")
12. "Melody"
13. "Good Good Feeling"
14. "Your Number" / "Replay" (Japanese remix ver.)
15. "Tell Me Your Name"
16. "Sherlock" (Japanese ver.)
17. "ABOAB"
18. "Nothing to Lose"
19. "Married to the Music" (Japanese ver.)
20. "Everybody" (Japanese ver.)
21. "Stand By Me" (Japanese ver.)
22. "To Your Heart"
23. "Diamond Sky"
24. "Winter Wonderland"

== Schedule ==
List of concerts, showing date, city, venue, and attendance
Date	City	Venue	Attendance
January 28, 2017	Fukui	Sun Dome Fukui	250,000
January 29, 2017	Fukui	Sun Dome Fukui	250,000
February 3, 2017	Kobe	World Memorial Hall	250,000
February 4, 2017	Kobe	World Memorial Hall	250,000
February 5, 2017	Kobe	World Memorial Hall	250,000
February 11, 2017	Fukuoka	Fukuoka Convention Center	250,000
February 12, 2017	Fukuoka	Fukuoka Convention Center	250,000
February 16, 2017	Osaka	Osaka-jō Hall	250,000
February 17, 2017	Osaka	Osaka-jō Hall	250,000
March 4, 2017	Shizuoka	Shizuoka Ecopa Arena	250,000
March 11, 2017	Tokyo	Yoyogi National Gymnasium	250,000
March 12, 2017	Tokyo	Yoyogi National Gymnasium	250,000
April 4, 2017	Nagoya	Nippon Gaishi Hall	250,000
April 5, 2017	Nagoya	Nippon Gaishi Hall	250,000
April 7, 2017	Osaka	Osaka-jō Hall	250,000
April 8, 2017	Osaka	Osaka-jō Hall	250,000
April 11, 2017	Saitama	Saitama Super Arena	250,000
April 12, 2017	Saitama	Saitama Super Arena	250,000
April 15, 2017	Hokkaido	Hokkaido Prefectural Sports Center	250,000
April 16, 2017	Hokkaido	Hokkaido Prefectural Sports Center	250,000
April 22, 2017	Hiroshima	Hiroshima Prefectural Sports Center	250,000
April 23, 2017	Hiroshima	Hiroshima Prefectural Sports Center	250,000
April 28, 2017	Tokyo	Yoyogi National Gymnasium	250,000
April 29, 2017	Tokyo	Yoyogi National Gymnasium	250,000
April 30, 2017	Tokyo	Yoyogi National Gymnasium	250,000
September 2, 2017	Tokyo	Tokyo Dome	180,000
September 3, 2017	Tokyo	Tokyo Dome	180,000
September 23, 2017	Osaka	Osaka City Dome	180,000
September 24, 2017	Osaka	Osaka City Dome	180,000
Total			430,000
