= 1 of 1 (Shinee album) =

- Digital and CD cover

Studio album by Shinee
- Released: October 5, 2016
- Recorded: 2016
- Studios: In Grid (Seoul); SM Big Shot (Seoul); SM Blue Cup (Seoul); SM Booming System (Seoul); Yireh (Seoul)
- Genres: K-pop; R&B; dance-pop; new jack swing
- Length: 31:50
- Languages: Korean; English
- Labels: SM; KT

Shinee chronology
D×D×D (2016)	1 of 1 (2016)	Five (2017)

Singles from 1 of 1
- 1. "1 of 1" Released: October 5, 2016

1 and 1 reissue cover
- Digital cover

Singles from 1 and 1
- 1. "Tell Me What to Do" Released: November 15, 2016

Music video
- "1 of 1" on YouTube "Tell Me What to Do" on YouTube

1 of 1 is the fifth Korean studio album and the ninth overall by South Korean boy band Shinee. It was released digitally and physically on October 5, 2016, under SM Entertainment and distributed by KT Music. The album contains nine songs, including the title track of the same name, "1 of 1". Musically, the album is a modernized twist on the retro genre, and stretches back to the 1980–1990 period. Additionally, based on their '90s theme, the group released a limited edition of cassette tapes alongside the CD version. In order to promote the album, Shinee appeared on several South Korean music programs, such as Music Bank, Show! Music Core, and Inkigayo, where they performed material from the album. On November 15, 2016, Shinee released a repackaged version of their fifth studio album titled 1 and 1 with five new songs, including the title track, "Tell Me What to Do". The album is also Shinee's last Korean album to feature Jonghyun prior to his death the following year.

The album received critical acclaim from music critics, who praised Shinee's successful attempt at the retro style, bringing back the classic, old-school boy band sound, while maintaining the dreamy-like sound of their last album, Odd. It was commercially successful in South Korea and peaked atop the Gaon Album Chart, selling over 170,000 album copies in one month. The album also charted at number two on the Billboard World Albums chart. Its title track, "1 of 1", peaked at number four on the Gaon Digital Chart and number three on the Billboard World Digital Song Sales chart.

The accompanying music video for "1 of 1" also received positive reviews. Stephanie Choi of Hello Asia and Gina Mei of Cosmopolitan praised the nostalgic feel of the video, as several aspects — the costumes, the simple, white backdrop, and old film transition techniques — reflect the retro style of the late 1980s and 1990s. Jeff Benjamin of Fuse praised the atypical portrayals of beauty, as the video includes many different looking female models.

== Background and release ==
=== 1 of 1 ===
On September 4, 2016, Shinee held their fifth solo concert, titled Shinee World V, in Seoul, South Korea. Four of the 34 songs that were performed were songs from the group's new album: "Prism", "Feel Good", "Don't Let Me Go" and "So Amazing". The album was originally intended to be released in the middle of September, but member Onew sustained an injury while performing during the group's concert and the album release was delayed. On September 27, 2016, the group's management agency, SM Entertainment, announced that the new album titled 1 of 1 would be released on October 5, 2016, and introduced a new Instagram account created for the group's activities. It was the group's first domestic studio album in over a year, after the release of Odd on May 18, 2015.

The track listing of the album was released on September 28, 2016, and included nine tracks. Additionally, to align with their '90s theme, the group also released limited edition cassette tapes alongside the CD version. Originally, only one thousand copies were produced for sale, but due to high demand more copies were put into production. SM Entertainment printed a limited 50,000 copies of the album in cassette format.

From September 28, 2016 to October 2, 2016, the group released several teasers through their Instagram account. Each member of the group introduced one song of their choice in a segment called "Shinee's Pick - What do you think of this song?" in a promotional radio notice inspired by the '90s along with each photo, which are previews of songs from the new album. On October 1, the group performed two new songs from the album, "Prism" and "Feel Good", at the Spectrum Dance Music Festival. On October 4, Shinee performed the title track "1 of 1" publicly on stage during their showcase for the album at the SM Town Coex Artium. The music video was revealed during the same event. Onew was unable to participate in the dance sequences due to his injury, but confirmed he was receiving treatment and was almost completely recovered. On October 6, the group began their promotions for the title song "1 of 1" on music shows, starting with Mnet's M! Countdown and followed by SBS' Inkigayo, KBS2's Music Bank and MBC's Show! Music Core. As part of the promotion, the group members also guested on several variety shows including Happy Together 3, Weekly Idol, Knowing Bros and KBS World's Guerilla Date.

=== 1 and 1 ===
On November 15, 2016, Shinee released a repackaged version of their fifth studio album under the title 1 and 1 with five new songs, including the title track "Tell Me What to Do". The album included two CDs, one consisting of only the new songs and its instrumentals and a second one with the songs from 1 of 1.

== Concept and composition ==
=== 1 of 1 ===
Both the fashion style and the music are inspired by the '90s. The album's concept hails back to "any period from the late 1970s to 1990s," according to member Jonghyun. The co-composer of the title track, Mike Daley, explained the producers tried to balance the retro with a modern feel. The album contains nine tracks including the title song "1 of 1", which is described as a song in the '90s new jack swing genre—a type of hip-hop infused with urban dance-pop. It is composed by Mike Daley, Mitchell Owens, Michael Jiminez, Tay Jasper and MZMC. The lyrics of the song tell a story about a man who is confessing to his girlfriend telling her she is the only love of his life. Daley, Owens and Jiminez, the songwriter trio of "1 of 1", focused on writing a retro song with a modern feel. Daley emphasized that he did not want the new song to be caught in the frame of an old fake song and tried to keep the balance between the retro style and modern sound by giving it a strong drum beat to lead the track.

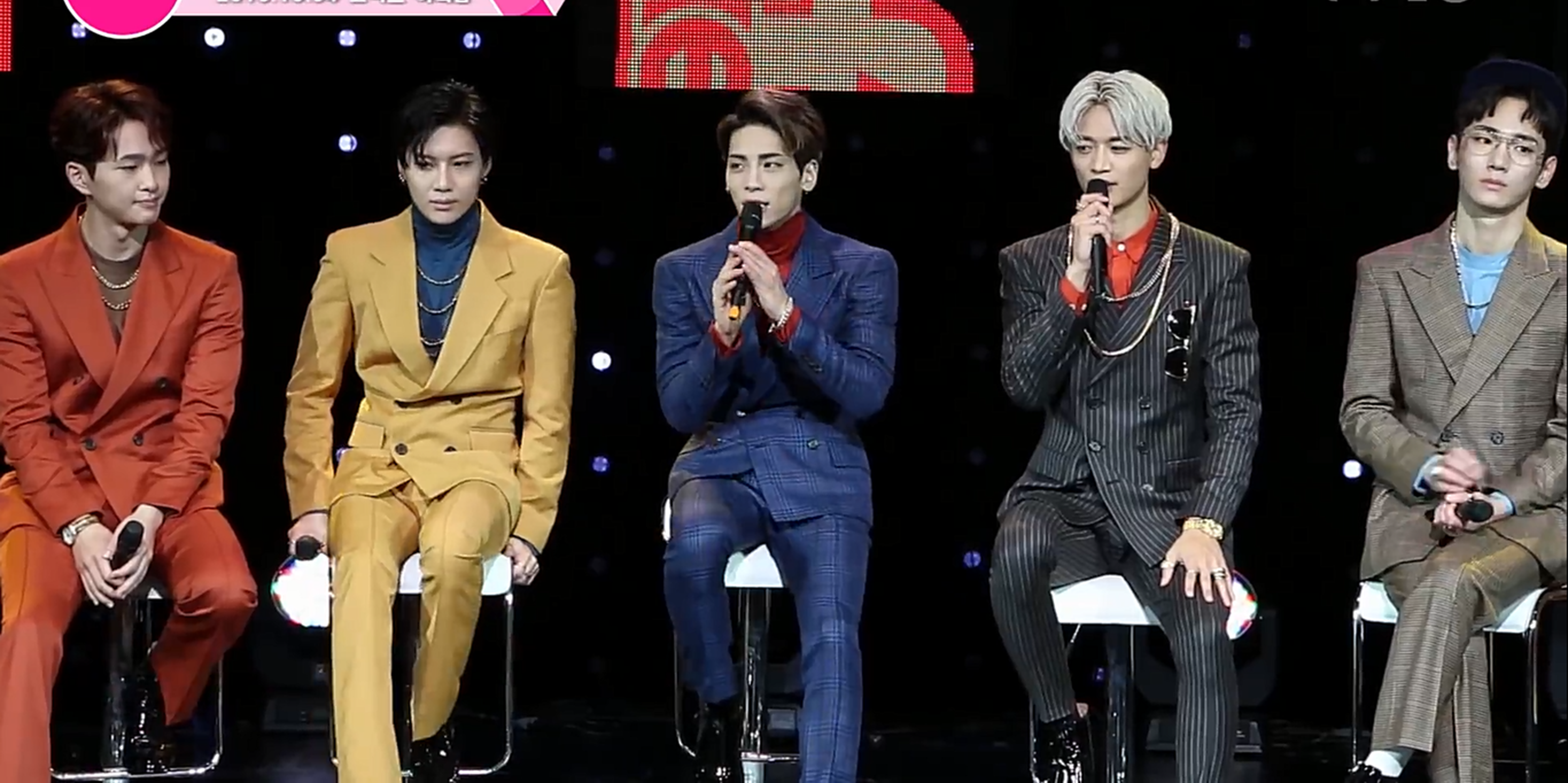
Shinee during the showcase of the album 1 of 1 on October 4, 2016

Many known producers contributed to the album like Kenzie, British electronic songwriting duo LDN Noise, and Swedish songwriter Andreas Öberg. Most of the songs were created in April 2016 at a songwriting camp hosted by SM Entertainment. Jonghyun took part in composing the song "Prism", a two-step pop number featuring piano and synthesizer chords. For the song "Don't Let Me Go" Key and Minho participated in the rap making. "So Amazing", another mix of new jack swing and mid-tempo retro pop, is written by member Onew, which compares Shinee's happy moments of meeting their fans in concerts to a happy drive along the coast with a lover. British duo LDN Noise, who wrote Shinee's previous songs "View" and "Married to the Music", participated in producing the seventh track "Shift". It is said to have the unique sound of '80s pop music, adopting influences from both the house and UK garage genres by mixing synthesizer and deep bass sounds.

=== 1 and 1 ===
The title track "Tell Me What to Do" of the repackaged album 1 and 1 is described as a medium-tempo "emotional R&B" track with "trendy electronic music" elements. The lyrics tell a story about a couple that attempts to spark their fading relationship. Yoo Young-jin, Kenzie, The Underdogs and Kim Eana participated in making Shinee's repackaged album. Onew, once again, took part in the songwriting process of the album, penning the lyrics to the song "Beautiful Life". For the repackaged album, the group emphasizes the vocals of its five members and take a ballad approach.

== Music video ==
The music video for 1 of 1 was released on October 5, 2016, through SM Entertainment's official YouTube channel, and takes inspiration from the 1990s—from the group's wardrobe to their dance moves. It also continues the retro theme with a technicolor scheme that recalls the aesthetic of the '30s and '40s. In the video, the members serenade their listeners while showing off their choreography. One of the group members, Onew, had to sit out for some of the dancing due to his injury, but is included in the video. Meanwhile, the members are surrounded by dozens of women wearing retro outfits and dance and pose around them. Jeff Benjamin of Fuse praised the atypical portrayals of beauty, stating: "from the female co-stars' rock messy hairstyles, dark lipsticks and eyeliners, and super-casual clothes, to the guys' offbeat hair colors (shoutout to Minho's turquoise-gray dye) and outfits, nothing is standard "K-pop" here".

== Reception ==
Critics have praised the group's attempt at the classic, old-school boy band sound. Both Tamar Herman of Billboard and Benjamin compared the title song to the music of groups like New Kids on the Block, New Edition and H.O.T. According to Benjamin, Shinee successfully brought their sound straight in to 2016's technology. He also compared the focus on singing directly to the listener and using the "you" pronoun to The Beatles' early material like "From Me to You" or "I Wanna Hold Your Hand". Stephanie Choi of Hello Asia and Gina Mei of Cosmopolitan compared the fashion style, filming techniques and overall aesthetic to the late 1980s and 90s, giving the music video a feeling of nostalgia. Choi also praised the group's successful attempt at retro styles that still maintain the previous dreamy-like Shinee sounds, like the track "Shift", which is a continuation of the group's previous songs "View" and "Married To The Music". The South Korean magazine Idology named 1 of 1 the best K-pop album of 2016.

The album was a commercial success in South Korea. It peaked atop the weekly Gaon Album Chart and the title song charted at number four on the Gaon Digital Chart. In the United States, 1 of 1 charted at number two on the Billboard World Albums chart, while the title song peaked at number three on the World Digital Songs chart. The album sold over 170,000 album copies in the first month of its release, making it the second best-selling album in South Korea for the month of October 2016.

=== Repackaging release ===
According to Lee Mi-hyun of JoongAng Daily, the most noteworthy feature of the repackage album was to pick "Tell Me What to Do" as the title song. He stated that it is an unfamiliar sound for a ballad, but is an interesting song choice because it shows the growth of Shinee's musicality, emphasizing that the group's "singing power is something, which needs to be carefully talked about". Sung Mi-kyung of OSEN likewise stated that Shinee have proved a broader musical spectrum through ballads with "outstanding sensitivity".

Jeff Benjamin of Fuse complimented the group's vocals in "Tell Me What to Do", particularly the chorus, with Jonghyun delivering "chill-inducing belts". He added it's done in a way that one can easily sing along with and stated that despite being released late into the year, the blend of melancholy and hope is helping the song to make a "last-minute run to be named one of the best K-pop singles of 2016". Tamar Herman of Billboard also praised the strong vocal performances from the members, particularly Onew and Taemin's sonorous belts, that made "Tell Me What to Do" the group's "most emotive single of the past few years".

== Track listing ==
1 of 1 track listing
No.	Title	Lyrics	Music	Arrangement	Length
1.	"Prism"	Jeon Gan-di	Jamil "Digi" Chammas; Deez; Wilbart "Vedo" McCoy III; MZMC; Otha "Vakseen" Davis III; Jonghyun	Chammas; Deez	3:11
2.	"1 of 1"	JQ (Makeumine Works); Jo Mi-yang (Makeumine Works); Bae Sung-hyun (Makeumine Works); Lee Seu-ran; Kim In-hyung; Park Seong-hee	Mike Daley; Mitchell Owens; Michael Jiminez; Jeremy "Tay" Jasper; MZMC	Daley; Owens	3:25
3.	"Feel Good"	Lee	Timothy "BOS" Bullock; Adrian McKinnon; Jasper; MZMC	Bullock; Jasper	3:39
4.	"Don't Let Me Go" (투명 우산; Tumyeong usan; 'Transparent Umbrella')	Jo Yoon-kyung; Minho; Key	Hyuk Shin (Joombas); Re:One (Joombas); Peter Tambakis; Davey Nate (Joombas)	Joombas	3:43
5.	"Lipstick"	Oh Min-joo; Minho	Harvey Mason Jr. (The Underdogs); Daley; Britt Burton; Tiffany Fred; Dewain Whitmore Jr.; Patrick "J. Que" Smith	Mason; Daley; Burton; Fred; Whitmore; Smith	3:34
6.	"Don't Stop"	Jonghyun; Minho; Key	The Stereotypes; Micah Powell; Maxx Song (Command Freaks)	The Stereotypes; Powell; Song	4:05
7.	"Shift"	Kenzie	Kenzie; LDN Noise; McKinnon	Kenzie; LDN Noise; McKinnon	3:02
8.	"U Need Me"	Agnes Shin (MonoTree); Minho	Andreas Öberg; Simon Petrén; Maja Keuc; Gustav Karlström	Öberg; Petrén; Keuc; Karlström	3:30
9.	"So Amazing" (Special Track)	Onew	Erik Lidbom; Takarot	Takarot	3:37
Total length:					31:50

1 and 1 track listing
No.	Title	Lyrics	Music	Arrangement	Length
1.	"Tell Me What to Do"	Yoo Young-jin; Kim Dong-hyun	Yoo; Daley; Owens; Whitmore; Smith	Yoo; Daley; Owens	4:06
2.	"Wish Upon a Star" (별빛 바램; Byeolbit baraem)	Kim Joon-il; Harang; Kim Jae-hyun	Kim Joon-il; Harang; Kim Jae-hyun	Kim Joon-il; Harang; Kim Jae-hyun	4:14
3.	"Beautiful Life" (한마디; Hanmadi; 'Word')	Onew	Öberg; Petrén; Jonah Nilsson	Öberg; Petrén; Nilsson	4:25
4.	"Rescue"	Kenzie	Kenzie; Mason; Daley; Whitmore	Kenzie; Mason; Daley; Whitmore	3:20
5.	"If You Love Her"	Kim Eana	Coach & Sendo; Matthew Tishler; Felicia Barton	Coach & Sendo; Tishler; Barton	4:16
6.	"Tell Me What to Do" (Instrumental)		Yoo; Daley; Owens; Whitmore; Smith	Yoo; Daley; Owens	4:09
7.	"Wish Upon a Star" (Instrumental)		Kim Joon-il; Harang; Kim Jae-hyun	Kim Joon-il; Harang; Kim Jae-hyun	4:14
8.	"Beautiful Life" (Instrumental)		Öberg; Petrén; Nilsson	Öberg; Petrén; Nilsson	4:25
9.	"Rescue" (Instrumental)		Kenzie; Mason; Daley; Whitmore	Kenzie; Mason; Daley; Whitmore	3:20
10.	"If You Love Her" (Instrumental)		Coach & Sendo; Tishler; Barton	Coach & Sendo; Tishler; Barton	4:09
Total length:					40:33

== Charts ==
=== Weekly charts ===
Chart (2016)	Peak position
South Korean Albums (Circle)	1
Japanese Albums (Oricon)	11
Japanese Hot Albums (Billboard Japan)	15
US Heatseekers Albums (Billboard)	14
US World Albums (Billboard)	2

=== Monthly charts ===
Chart (2016)	Peak position
Korean Albums (Gaon)	2
Japanese Albums (Oricon)	32

== Awards and nominations ==
Awards and nominations for 1 of 1
Ceremony	Year	Category	Result	Ref.
Golden Disc Awards	2017	Disc Bonsang	Won	
Golden Disc Awards	2017	Disc Daesang	Nominated	
Mnet Asian Music Awards	2016	Album of the Year	Nominated	

Music program awards
Song	Program	Date	Ref.
"1 of 1"	The Show	October 11, 2016	
"1 of 1"	M! Countdown	October 13, 2016	
"1 of 1"	Music Bank	October 14, 2016	
"1 of 1"	Inkigayo	October 16, 2016	
