= Olympic Gymnastics Arena =

Indoor sports arena in Seoul, South Korea

- KSPO Dome
- The arena in 2020
- Interactive map of Olympic Gymnastics Arena
- Location: Bangi-dong, Songpa District, Seoul, South Korea
- Coordinates: 37.51916°N 127.127514°E
- Capacity: 15,000

Construction
- Groundbreaking: 31 August 1984
- Opened: 30 April 1986
- Renovated: 2016–2018
- Architects: Kim Swoo-geun (Space Group of Korea – SKG)
- Structural engineers: David H. Geiger (original); Haeahn Architecture (2018 renovations)

- Olympic Gymnastics Arena
- Hangul: 올림픽체조경기장
- Hanja: 올림픽體操競技場
- RR: Ollimpik chejo gyeonggijang
- MR: Ollimp'ik ch'ejo kyŏnggijang

The Olympic Gymnastics Arena (Korean: 올림픽체조경기장), also known as the KSPO Dome since 2018, is an indoor arena located within the Olympic Park in Seoul, South Korea. It has a capacity of 15,000.

It was constructed between 31 August 1984 and 30 April 1986, to host the gymnastics competitions at the 1988 Summer Olympics. The roof was designed by David H. Geiger. It is a self-supporting cable dome – the first of its kind ever built – with a four-layer fabric cladding. In 2018, the arena was extensively remodeled, including improving the conditions for concerts and redesigning the facade.

== History ==
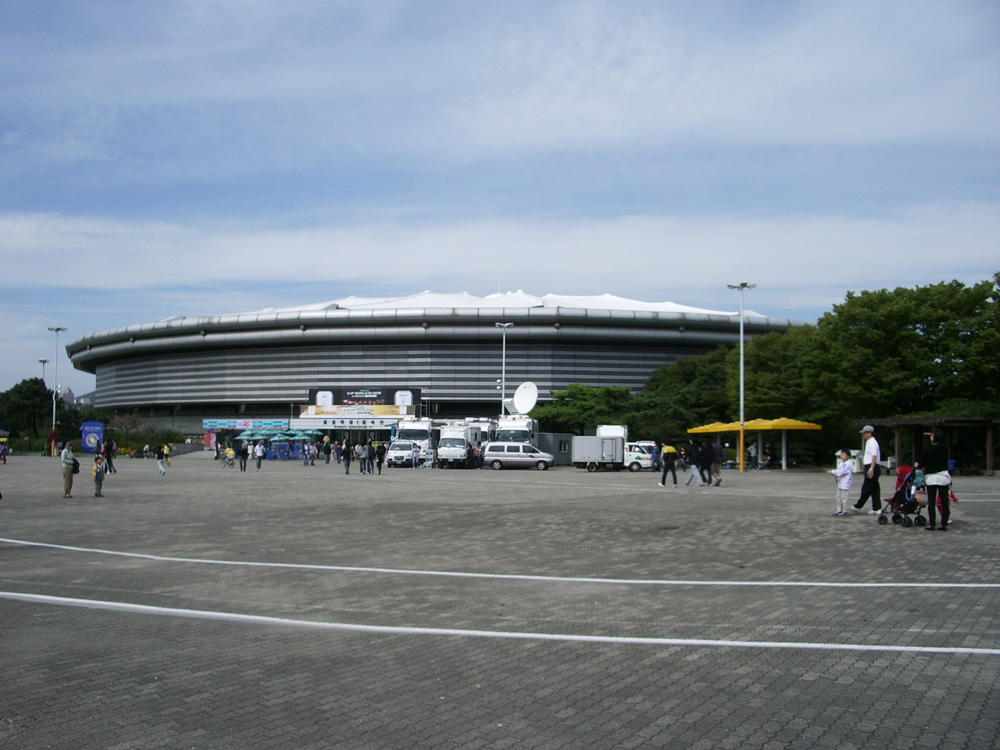
The arena in 2008 with the old facade

Since the Olympics it has hosted a variety of events, notably as a concert venue for both South Korean and international artists.

The arena is also infamous due to an incident on 17 February 1992 when American boy band New Kids on the Block abruptly halted their performance after 20 minutes due to a fatal human crush incident where teenagers swarmed the band to the stage. One person was killed and about 50 people treated for injuries.

== Events ==
Olympic Gymnastics Hall in 2012

=== 1991–1999 ===
- Andy Lau: First Concert Tour – 16–19 August 1991
- New Kids on the Block: No More Games Tour – 17 February 1992
- Bryan Adams: So Far So Good Tour – 22 February 1994
- Deep Purple: 'The Battle Rages On' Tour – 18 and 19 March 1995
- Toto: Tambu World Tour – 14 April 1996
- Santana: Dance of the Rainbow Serpent Tour – 22 May 1996
- Def Leppard: Slang World Tour – 8 June 1996
- Céline Dion: Falling Into You: Around the World – 21 February 1997
- Eric Clapton: Change The World Tour – 9 and 10 October 1997
- H.O.T.: 98 H.O.T. 1st Concert – 23–25 January 1998
- Metallica: Poor RE-Touring Me – 24 and 25 April 1998
- Megadeth: Cryptic Writings Tour – 14 November 1998
- Alanis Morissette: Junkie Tour 1999 – 26 October 1999

=== 2000–2007 ===
- Megadeth: Risk Tour – 1 March 2000
- Linkin Park: Meteora World Tour – 29 October 2003
- Namie Amuro: So Crazy Tour – 13–15 May 2004
- 1st Asia Song Festival, organised by Korea Foundation for International Culture Exchange, 16 November 2001
- L'Arc~en~Ciel: ASIALIVE 2005 – 3 September 2005
- Backstreet Boys: never gone tour – 14 January 2006
- Shinhwa: 2006 Tour: State of the Art – 13 and 14 May 2006
- Rain: Rain's Coming World Tour – 15 and 16 December
- Eric Clapton: Back Home World Tour 2006/7 – 23 January 2007
- Christina Aguilera: Back to Basics Tour – 23 and 24 June 2007. Opening acts: Ivy (day 1) and Lee Min-woo (day 2)
- BigBang: The R.E.A.L – 30 December 2006
- SM Town: 2007 SM Town Summer Concert – 30 June – 1 July 2007
- Beyoncé: The Beyoncé Experience – 9 and 10 November 2007
- BigBang: The G.R.E.A.T – 28, 29 and 30 December 2007

=== 2008 ===
- Céline Dion: Taking Chances World Tour – 18 and 19 March 2008
- Shinhwa: Shinhwa Must Go On: 10th Anniversary Live in Seoul – 29 and 30 March 2008
- Maroon 5: It Won't Be Soon Before Long Tour – 7 May 2008
- Duran Duran: Red Carpet Massacre Tour – 17 April 2008
- L'Arc~en~Ciel: TOUR 2008 L'7 ~ Trans ASIA via PARIS – 17 May 2008
- Billy Joel: Billy Joel Live in Seoul 2008 – 15 November 2008

=== 2009 ===
- BigBang: Big Show 2009 – 30, 31 January and 1 February
- TVXQ: The 3rd Asia Tour: MIROTIC – 20, 21 and 22 February
- Rain: Legend of Rainism Tour – 9 and 10 October
- Beyoncé: I Am... World Tour – 20 and 21 October
- G-Dragon: Shine A Light Concert – 5 and 6 December
- Guns N' Roses: Chinese Democracy Tour – 13 December

=== 2010 ===
- BigBang: Big Show 2010 – 29, 30 and 31 January
- Whitney Houston: Nothing but Love World Tour – 6 and 7 February
- SS501: 1st Asia Tour "Persona" Encore – 27 February
- Bob Dylan: Never Ending Tour 2010 – 31 March
- 2PM: Don't Stop Can't Stop – 31 July and 1 August
- Super Junior: Super Show 3 – 14 and 15 August 2010
- Lee Seung-gi: Hope Concert – 21 November

=== 2011 ===
- Shinee: Shinee World – 1 and 2 January
- Taylor Swift: Speak Now World Tour – 11 February
- Eric Clapton: 2011 Tour – 20 February
- BigBang: Big Show 2011 – 25–27 February
- Santana: Asia / Australia Tour 2011 – 9 March
- The Eagles: Long Road Out of Eden Tour – 15 March
- Girls' Generation: Girls' Generation Tour – 23 and 24 July
- Linkin Park: A Thousand Suns World Tour – 8 September
- Super Junior: "Super Show 4 World Tour" – 19 and 20 November
- 2011 Melon Music Awards – 24 November
- YG Family: YG Family Concert – 3 and 4 December
- Lee Seung-gi: Hope Concert 2011 – 10 and 11 December

=== 2012 ===
- 21st Seoul Music Awards – 19 January
- Beast: Beautiful Show – 4 and 5 February
- Infinite: 1st Concert Second Invasion – 11 and 12 February
- Kara: Karasia in Seoul – 18 and 19 February
- BigBang: Alive Galaxy Tour – 2, 3 and 4 March
- Shinhwa: 2012 Shinhwa Grand Tour in Seoul: The Return – 24 and 25 March
- Super Junior: "Super Show 4 World Tour" Encore – 26 and 27 May
- Shinee: Shinee World II – 21 and 22 July
- 2NE1: New Evolution Global Tour – 28 and 29 July
- TVXQ: Catch Me: Live World Tour – 17 and 18 November
- Elton John: 40th Anniversary of the Rocket Man – 27 November
- Lee Seung-gi: Hope Concert 2012 – 1 and 2 December
- Sting: Back to Bass Tour – 5 December
- 2012 Melon Music Awards – 14 December

=== 2013 ===
- BigBang: Alive Galaxy Tour: The Final – 25, 26 and 27 January
- 10cm: Fine Thank You and You? – 23 February
- Shinhwa: 2013 Shinhwa 15th Anniversary Concert: The Legend Continues – 16 and 17 March
- Super Junior: Super Show 5 World Tour – 23 and 24 March
- G-Dragon: One of a Kind World Tour – 30 and 31 March
- Sigur Rós: Sigur Rós World Tour 2013 – 19 May
- Cho Yong-pil: Cho Yong-pil Concert Tour – 31 May and 1, 2 June
- Girls' Generation: Girls & Peace World Tour – 8 and 9 June
- Beast: 2013 Beautiful Show – 20 and 21 July
- Shinhwa: 2013 Shinhwa Grand Tour in Seoul: The Classic – 3 and 4 August (finale shows)
- Infinite: One Great Step – 9 and 10 August
- G-Dragon: One of a Kind World Tour – 31 August and 1 September
- 2013 Melon Music Awards – 14 November
- VIXX: The Milky Way Global Showcase Finale In Seoul – 17 November
- Cho Yong-pil: Cho Yong-pil Concert Tour – 13, 14 and 15 December

=== 2014 ===
- Teen Top: High Kick Tour – 22 and 23 February
- BigBang: BigBang+α in Seoul 2014 – 24, 25 and 26 January
- 3rd Gaon Chart K-Pop Awards – 12 February
- Infinite: One Great Step Returns – 28 February and 1 March
- Shinee: Shinee World III – 8 and 9 March
- Shinhwa: 16th Anniversary Concert 'Here' – 22 and 23 March
- Bruno Mars: The Moonshine Jungle Tour – 8 April
- Exo: Exo from Exoplanet 1 – The Lost Planet – 23, 24 and 25 May
- Beast: 2014 Beautiful Show – 16 and 17 August
- 2014 League of Legends World Championship Semifinals – 11 and 12 October
- 2014 Melon Music Awards – 13 November

=== 2015 ===
- 24th Seoul Music Awards – 22 January
- 4th Gaon Chart K-Pop Awards – 28 January
- Winner: Worldwide Inner Circle Conference WWIC 2015 – 31 January
- Park Hyo-shin: 15th anniversary live tour – HAPPY TOGETHER – 14 and 15 February
- Infinite: 2015 Infinite Rally 2–28 February and 1 March
- Exo: Exo Planet #2 – The Exo'luxion – 7, 8, 13, 14 and 15 March
- Shinhwa: 17th Anniversary Concert – WE – 21 and 22 March
- VIXX: Live Fantasia [Utopia] – 28 and 29 March
- BigBang: Made World Tour – 25 and 26 April
- Shinee: Shinee World IV – 15, 16 and 17 May
- TVXQ: Tistory: Special Live Tour Encore – 13 and 14 June
- 2PM: House Party Concerts – 27 and 28 June
- Super Junior: Super Show 6 Seoul (encore) – 11 and 12 July
- Infinite: Infinite Effect World Tour – 8 and 9 August
- Beast: 2015 Beautiful Show – 29 and 30 August
- iKon: Debut Concert 'Showtime' – 3 October
- 2015 Melon Music Awards – 7 November
- Girls' Generation: Girls' Generation's Phantasia – 21 and 22 November
- UFC Fight Night: Henderson vs. Masvidal – 28 November
- Cho Yong-pil: Cho Yong-pil Concert Tour – 12 December
- g.o.d: god 2015 CONCERT – 16, 17, 18, 19 and 20 December

=== 2016 ===
- 25th Seoul Music Awards – 14 January
- iKon: iKoncert 2016 'Showtime' Tour in SEOUL – 30 and 31 January
- Infinite: [Infinite Effect] Advance – 20 and 21 February
- BigBang: Made World Tour (Encore) – 4, 5 and 6 March
- Winner: Exit Tour in SEOUL – 12 and 13 March
- Exo: Exo Planet #2 – The Exo'luxion (dot) – 18, 19 and 20 March
- Shinhwa: 18th Anniversary Concert – HERO – 26 and 27 March
- Block B: Blockbuster Tour – 2 and 3 April
- BTS: The Most Beautiful Moment in Life on stage: epilogue – 7 and 8 May
- Xia: 5th Asia Tour Concert in Seoul: Xignature – 11 and 12 June
- Exo: Exo Planet #3 – The Exo'rdium – 22, 23, 24, 29, 30 and 31 July
- VIXX: Live Fantasia – 13 and 14 August
- Beast: 2016 Beautiful Show – 20 and 21 August
- Shinee: Shinee World V – 2, 3 and 4 September
- Sechs Kies: 2016 Concert 'Yellow Note' – 10 and 11 September

=== 2018 ===
- Shinee: Shinee Special Party – The Shining – 1, and 2 September
- BtoB: 2018 BtoB Time – This Is Us – 10, 11 and 12 August
- iKon: iKon 2018 Continue Tour – 18 August
- 2nd Soribada Best K-Music Awards – 30 August
- Seventeen: 2018 Seventeen Concert 'Ideal Cut: The Final Scene' – 3 and 4 November
- Blackpink: In Your Area World Tour – 10 and 11 November
- IU: 2018 IU 10th Anniversary Tour Concert – 17 and 18 November
- Highlight: Highlight Live 2018 [Outro] – 24 and 25 November
- Cho Yong-pil: Cho Yong-pil Concert Tour – 15 and 16 December

=== 2019 ===
- NCT 127: NCT 127 1st Tour: Neo City – The Origin – 26 and 27 January
- Super Junior: Super Show 8: Infinite Time – 2 and 3 March
- NU'EST: NU'EST 2019 Concert: Segno in Seoul – 12, 13 and 14 April
- Troye Sivan: The Bloom Tour – 27 April
- Twice: Twice World Tour 2019 "Twicelights" – 25 and 26 May
- Got7: Got World Tour 2019 "Keep Spinning" – 15 and 16 June
- BTS: 5th Muster 'MAGIC SHOP' – 22 and 23 June
- Park Hyo-shin : 20th anniversary live tour – 2019 LOVERS (KSPO Dome 360 degree stage) – 29 and 30 June 5, 7, 11 and 13 July
- 2nd Genie Music Awards – 1 August
- 3rd Soribada Best K-Music Awards – 22 and 23 August
- Exo: Exo Planet #5 – Exploration – 19, 20, 21, 26, 27 and 28 July
- Seventeen: Seventeen World Tour 'Ode To You' – 30, 31 August and 1 September
- The Chainsmokers : World War Joy Tour – 6 September
- Hans Zimmer: Live On Tour – 28 and 29 September
- AB6IX: AB6IX 1st World Tour "6ixense" in Seoul – 9 and 10 November
- NU'EST: NU'EST 2019 Fanmeeting: L.O.Λ.E Page – 15, 16 and 17 November
- IU : IU Tour Concert "Love, Poem" 2019 (KSPO Dome 360 degree stage) – 23 and 24 November
- Exo: Exo Planet #5 – Exploration (dot) – 29, 30, and 31 December

=== 2020 ===
- Gmarket Smile Club Concert 2020 – 4 January
- BTS: Map of the Soul ON:E (Online) – 10 and 11 October

=== 2021 ===
- Baekhyun: Beyond Live – Baekhyun: Light (Online) – 3 January
- 30th Seoul Music Awards (Online) – 16 May
- Twice: Twice 4th World Tour 'III' – 25 and 26 December

=== 2022 ===
- Street Woman Fighter: On The Stage Encore Concert – 1 and 2 January
- Universe: "UNI-KON" 2022 – 2 and 3 July
- The Boyz: The Boyz World Tour The-B Zone in Seoul Encore – 5, 6, and 7 August
- Girls' Generation: Special Event – Long Lasting Love – 3 September
- Stray Kids: 2nd World Tour "MANIAC" Seoul Special (Unveil 11) – 17 and 18 September
- 2022 The Fact Music Awards – 8 October
- Blackpink: Born Pink World Tour – 15 and 16 October
- Treasure: Treasure Tour Hello – 12 and 13 November
- Cho Yong-pil: Cho Yong-pil Concert Tour – 26, 27 November and 3, 4 December
- g.o.d: 23rd Anniversary Concert 2022 – 9, 10 and 11 December
- BtoB: BtoB 10th Anniversary Concert 2022 BtoB Time [Be Together] – 30, 31 December 2022 and 1 January 2023

=== 2023 ===
- 32nd Seoul Music Awards – 19 January
- 12th Circle Chart Music Awards – 18 February
- Conan Gray: Superache Tour – 28 February
- Seventeen: 2023 SVT 7th Fanmeeting <Seventeen in Carat Land> – 10, 11 and 12 March
- Harry Styles: Love On Tour – 20 March
- Tomorrow X Together: World Tour 'Act: Sweet Mirage' – 25 and 26 March
- Red Velvet: 4th Concert 'R to V' – 1 and 2 April
- Exo: 2023 Fanmeeting "Exo' Clock" – 8 and 9 April
- Twice: Twice 5th World Tour 'Ready To Be' – 15 and 16 April
- The Boyz: Zeneration World Tour – 19, 20 and 21 May
- Taeyeon: The Odd of Love – 3 and 4 June
- HYBE Labels: 2023 Weverse Con Festival – 10 and 11 June
- (G)I-dle: I Am Free-Ty World Tour - 17 and 18 June
- Shinee: Shinee World VI: Perfect Illumination – 23, 24 & 25 June
- Stray Kids: Stray Kids 3rd Fanmeeting 'Pilot For :☆☆☆☆☆' – 1 and 2 July
- Monsta X: Monsta X 7th Fanmeeting "MX Friends" – 8 and 9 July
- Enhypen: World Tour 'FATE' – 29 and 30 July
- Suga: Agust D Tour: D-Day – 4, 5 and 6 August
- Infinite: Comeback Again – 19 and 20 August
- IU: I+UN1VER5E Fan Concert – 23 and 24 September
- Charlie Puth: Charlie the Live Experience – 20, 21 and 22 October
- Kim Dong-Ryul: Melody – 07~08, 13~15 October
- Sam Smith: Gloria the Tour – 17 and 18 October
- Lim Young-woong: Im Hero Tour 2023 – 27–29 October, 3–5 November
- g.o.d: g.o.d's Masterpiece - 10, 11 and 12 November
- NCT 127: Neo City – The Unity – 17–19 November, 24–26 November
- The Boyz: Zeneration World Tour (Encore) – 1, 2 and 3 December
- Cho Yong-pil: Cho Yong-pil Concert Tour – 9 and 10 December
- Treasure: 2023 Treasure Concert 'Reboot' In Seoul – 15, 16, and 17 December

=== 2024 ===
- Enhypen: World Tour 'Fate Plus' – 24 and 25 February
- IU: IU HEREH World Tour – 2, 3, 9 and 10 March
- Baekhyun: Lonsdaleite Tour – 16 and 17 March
- Stray Kids: 4th Fanmeeting "SKZ's Magic School" – 29, 30 and 31 March
- Highlight: Lights Go On, Again — 10, 11 and 12 May
- 2024 LCK Spring Playoff Finals
- AKMU: 10th Anniversary Concert [10VE] – 15 and 16 June
- Super Junior: Super Show Spin-off: Halftime – 22 and 23 June
- The Boyz: Zeneration II World Tour– 12, 13 and 14 July
- Baekhyun: Lonsdaleite Tour (dot) – 27 and 28 July
- (G)I-dle: I-dol World Tour – 3 and 4 August
- Ive: Show What I Have World Tour Encore in Seoul – 10 and 11 August
- Treasure: 2024 Treasure 'Reboot' Final In Seoul – 15 August
- Stray Kids: Dominate World Tour – 24, 25, 31 August and 1 September
- Riize: Riizing Day – 13, 14 and 15 September
- Zerobaseone: Timeless World – 20, 21 and 22 September
- g.o.d: 25th Anniversary: Chapter 0 - 27, 28 and 29 September
- Cho Yong-pil: Cho Yong-pil Concert Tour – 23, 24, 30 November and 1 December
- Infinite: Limited Edition – 6, 7 and 8 December

=== 2025 ===
- Na Hoon-a: Thank You – Last Concert – 10, 11, and 12 January
- Davichi: A Stitch in Time – 18 and 19 January
- Babymonster: Hello Monsters World Tour – 25 and 26 January
- Younha: Growth Theory: Final Edition (Encore) – 14, 15 and 16 February
- J-Hope: Hope on the Stage Tour – 28 February, 1 and 2 March
- Taeyeon: The Tense – 7, 8 and 9 March
- Aespa: Synk: Parallel Line (Encore) – 15 and 16 March
- Ateez: Towards the Light: Will to Power (Finale) – 22 and 23 March
- Ive: <Ive Scout> Fan Concert – 5 and 6 April
- 2NE1: Welcome Back Tour (Encore) – 12 and 13 April
- Zerobaseone: Blue Mansion Fan Concert – 18, 19 and 20 April
- Taemin: Ephemeral Gaze World Tour – 26 and 27 April
- Yuuri: Yuuri Arena Live 2025 at Seoul – 3 and 4 May
- Day6: Forever Young World Tour – 9, 10, 11, 16, 17 and 18 May
- Shinee: Shinee World VII: E.S.S.A.Y – 23, 24 and 25 May
- Baekhyun: Reverie World Tour – 7 and 8 June
- BoyNextDoor: Knock ON Vol.1 Tour – 25, 26 and 27 June
- Riize: Riizing Loud – 4, 5 and 6 July
- Highlight: Ride or Die Live Tour – 11, 12 and 13 July
- Monsta X: Connect X – 18, 19 and 20 July
- The Boyz: The Blaze World Tour – 8, 9 and 10 August
- Plave: Dash: Quantum Leap – 15, 16 and 17 August
- Super Junior: Super Show 10 – 22, 23 and 24 August
- Aespa: Synk: Aexis Line – 29, 30 and 31 August
- Christopher: Christopher Live in Seoul – 6 September
- IU: 2025 IU Fan Meet-Up (Bye Summer) – 13 and 14 September
- Zerobaseone: Here & Now Tour – 3, 4 and 5 October
- Treasure: Pulse On Tour – 10, 11 and 12 October
- Enhypen: World Tour 'Walk The Line Final' – 24, 25, and 26 October
- Ive: Show What I Am World Tour – 31 October, 1 and 2 November
- Kim Dong-Ryul: Stroll – 8-10 and 13-16 November
- g.o.d : 2025 g.o.d Concert - 5, 6 and 7 December
- Day6: 2025 Day6 Special Concert "The Present" – 19, 20, and 21 December

=== 2026 ===
- Baekhyun: Reverie World Tour – 02, 03 and 04 January
- Cho Yong-pil: Cho Yong-pil Concert Tour – 09, 10 and 11 January
- Yim Jae-beom: 40th Anniversary Concert "I am Lim Jae-beom." – 17 and 18 January
- Davichi: Time Capsule Concert – 24 and 25 January
- Monsta X: The X: Nexus World Tour – 30 and 31 January, 1 February
- G-Dragon: Fam+ily: Family: Fam I Love You Fanmeeting Tour – 06, 07 and 08 February
- I-dle: Syncopation World Tour – 21 and 22 February
- Tomorrow X Together: TXT MOA Con – 27 and 28 February, 1 March
- Riize: Riizing Loud – 6, 7 and 8 March
- ZEROBASEONE: Here & Now - 13, 14, 15 March
- NCT Dream: The Dream Show 4: Dream the Future – 20, 21, 22, 27, 28 and 29 March
- Super Junior: Super Show 10 – 3, 4 and 5 April
- Exo: Exo Planet #6 – Exhorizon – 10, 11 and 12 April
- NCT Wish: Into The Wish : Our Wish Concert Tour – 17, 18 and 19 April
- Enhypen: ‘Blood Saga’ World Tour in Seoul - 01, 02 and 03 May
- Lucy: LUCY 9th Concert <Island> - 16 and 17 May
- SHINee: SHINee World VIII: The Invert - 29, 30, and 31 May
- TWS: 24/7:FOR:YOU Tour - 26 and 27 June
- Twice: This Is For World Tour Finale - 10, 11, and 12 July
- T1 Home Ground 2026 - 14, 15 and 16 August
- LCK 2026: Lower Bracket Finals and Grand Finals – 12 and 13 September

== See also ==
- List of indoor arenas in South Korea
