= SM Town Live '08 =

2008–09 concert tour

SMTOWN Live '08
- Tour by SM Entertainment artists
- Poster for the Seoul concert
- Location: Worldwide
- Start date: August 15, 2008
- End date: February 7, 2009
- Legs: 1
- No. of shows: 3
- Attendance: 110,000

SM Entertainment artists concert chronology
- SMTOWN Live '08 (2008–2009); SMTOWN Live '10 World Tour (2010–2011)

SM Town Live '08 (stylized as SMTOWN Live '08) is the first joint concert tour of SM Entertainment artists.

== Performers ==
Seoul, South Korea (August 15, 2008)
- BoA
- Song Kwangsik
- Chu Gayeoul
- TVXQ
- The Grace
- Super Junior
  - (Leeteuk, Heechul, Hangeng, Yesung, Kangin, Shindong, Sungmin, Eunhyuk, Siwon, Donghae, Ryeowook, Kim Ki-bum, Kyuhyun)
- Zhang Liyin
- Girls' Generation
- SHINee
Shanghai, China (September 13, 2008)
- TVXQ
- The Grace
- Super Junior
  - (Leeteuk, Heechul, Hangeng, Yesung, Kangin, Shindong, Sungmin, Eunhyuk, Siwon, Zhou Mi, Donghae, Ryeowook, Kim Ki-bum, Kyuhyun, Henry)
- Zhang Liyin
- Girls' Generation
- SHINee
Bangkok, Thailand (February 7, 2009)
- TVXQ
- The Grace
- Super Junior
  - (Leeteuk, Heechul, Hangeng, Yesung, Kangin, Shindong, Sungmin, Eunhyuk, Siwon, Zhou Mi, Donghae, Ryeowook, Kim Ki-bum, Kyuhyun, Henry)
- Zhang Liyin
- Girls' Generation
- SHINee
Notes
- During the show in Bangkok, it was the last time TVXQ performed as a five-member group before Kim Jaejoong, Park Yoochun, and Kim Junsu left the group and started a lawsuit against SM Entertainment.
- During the show in Bangkok, Hangeng performed as a Super Junior member for the last time before the contract termination.
- During the show in Bangkok, Kibum performed as a Super Junior member for the last time before becoming an actor.

== Shows ==
Date	City	Country	Venue	Attendance
August 15, 2008	Seoul	South Korea	Seoul Olympic Stadium	45,000
September 13, 2008	Shanghai	China	Shanghai Stadium	40,000
February 7, 2009	Bangkok	Thailand	Rajamangala National Stadium	40,000
