= Shinee World (tour) =

2010–11 concert tour by Shinee

- Asia tour by Shinee
- The official poster of the tour
- Location: Asia
- Associated album: The Shinee World, Lucifer
- Start date: December 26, 2010
- End date: November 25, 2011
- Legs: 5
- No. of shows: 10

Shinee concert chronology
- Shinee World (2010–2011); Shinee World 2012 (2012)

Shinee World (promoted as SHINee THE 1ST CONCERT "SHINee WORLD") was the first independent concert tour by South Korean boy group Shinee. The tour kicked off in Tokyo on December 26, 2010, and ended in Osaka on November 25, 2011, with a total of 10 concerts in seven cities. It attracted audiences of approximately 110,000.

The photobook of the concert, The 1st Concert "Shinee World", was released on December 26, 2011. Shinee also released a DVD, The 1st Concert in Japan "Shinee World", on January 11, 2012, filmed at their concerts in Tokyo and Nagoya. This was followed by a live album, The 1st Concert Album "Shinee World", which was recorded in Seoul and released on February 1, 2012.

== Background ==
On October 26, 2010, SM Entertainment announced that Shinee would commence their first concert tour on December 18 at KBS 88 Gymnasium in Seoul. However, in order to accommodate demand, they changed the venue to the Olympic Gymnastics Arena and rescheduled it to the following year. The tour instead began in Tokyo on December 26, 2010, at Yoyogi National Gymnasium. Originally scheduled for 6PM, an additional performance was added at 1PM due to heavy demand from fans. Over 100,000 people applied for tickets through a lottery system and both concerts sold out. At the concert, they announced that they had signed with EMI Music Japan for Japanese promotions, which were due to begin in March. Shinee's rescheduled Seoul concert took place on January 1, 2011. Jonghyun was unable to participate in the dance performances in the Tokyo and Seoul concerts due to an ankle injury he sustained during a promotional tour in Indonesia in October 2010. He was replaced by SM trainee Lay.

On July 16, Shinee held their first concert in Taipei at Taipei Arena. Their labelmate Zhang Liyin appeared as a special guest and sang a duet with Jonghyun. 10,000 tickets were sold within an hour. On August 20, Shinee held a concert in Nanjing, China, at Nanjing Olympic Sports Center Gymnasium, followed by Singapore on September 10. Online ticket reservations for Shinee's Singapore concert began on July 31 and within 45 minutes, all tickets were sold out. The production cost was estimated to be around $1.7 million. Shinee held a concert at Nippon Gaishi Hall in Nagoya on October 27. Live recordings of performances from the concert were released on a DVD, Shinee The 1st Concert In Japan "Shinee World", on January 11, 2012. Shinee concluded their tour in Osaka on November 24 and 25, 2011.

== Setlist ==
1. "The Shinee World (Doo-Bop)"
2. "Senorita"
3. "Get Down"
4. "Amigo" (Rock remix ver.)
5. "Juliette"
6. "Stand By Me"
7. "Your Name"
8. "Love Still Goes On"
9. "Hello"
10. "Girls" – Jonghyun
11. "OMG" – Minho
12. "My First Kiss" – Key with f(x)’s Krystal (Tokyo and Seoul), now with Taemin
13. "Romeo + Juliette" – Taemin
14. "A-Yo"
15. "Romantic"
16. "Life"
17. "Quasimodo"
18. "Love Like Oxygen"
19. "Replay"
20. "Obsession"
21. "Graze"
22. "Nessun Dorma" – Onew
23. "Ring Ding Dong" (Remix ver.)
24. "Up and Down"
25. "Ready or Not"
26. "Lucifer" (Remix ver.)

Encore

27. "JoJo"
28. "Bodyguard"
29. "One"

== Tour dates ==
List of concerts, showing date, city, country, venue, guests and attendance
| Date | City | Country | Venue | Special guests | Attendance |
|---|---|---|---|---|---|
| December 26, 2010 (2 shows) | Tokyo | Japan | Yoyogi National Gymnasium | Krystal (duet with Key) | 24,000 |
| January 1, 2011 | Seoul | South Korea | Olympic Gymnastics Arena | Krystal (duet with Key) | 20,000 |
| January 2, 2011 | Seoul | South Korea | Olympic Gymnastics Arena | Krystal (duet with Key); Simon D (duet with Minho) | 20,000 |
| July 16, 2011 | Taipei | Taiwan | Taipei Arena | Zhang Liyin (duet with Jonghyun) | 10,000 |
| August 20, 2011 | Nanjing | China | Nanjing Olympic Sports Center Gymnasium | Zhang Liyin (duet with Jonghyun) | — |
| September 10, 2011 | Singapore | | Singapore Indoor Stadium | —N/a | 6,000 |
| October 27, 2011 | Nagoya | Japan | Nippon Gaishi Hall | —N/a | — |
| November 24, 2011 | Osaka | Japan | Osaka-jō Hall | —N/a | 18,000 |
| November 25, 2011 | Osaka | Japan | Osaka-jō Hall | —N/a | 18,000 |
| Estimated total | | | | | 110,000 |

== DVD ==
Shinee The 1st Concert In Japan "Shinee World"

Video by Shinee
- Released: January 11, 2012
- Recorded: 2010–11
- Genres: J-pop, K-pop
- Label: EMI Music Japan

Shinee chronology
| Shinee The 1st Concert In Japan "Shinee World" (2012) | Shinee – The 1st Concert In Seoul "Shinee World" (2012) |

On December 24, 2011, it was announced that Shinee would release a DVD of their Shinee World concert in Japan on January 11, 2012. It was filmed at Yoyogi National Stadium in Tokyo on December 26, 2010, and Nippon Gaishi Hall in Nagoya on October 27, 2011.

In the first week of sales, it sold over 29,000 copies, giving them second place on the weekly Oricon DVD Chart. This was the highest peak by an overseas male artist on the DVD chart since Oricon began DVD rankings in 1999.

=== Track listing ===
1. "The Shinee World"
2. "Senorita"
3. "Get Down"
4. "Amigo"
5. "Juliette" (Japanese ver.)
6. "Hello" (Japanese ver.)
7. "Your Name"
8. "Stand by Me" (Japanese ver.)
9. "Love Still Goes On"
10. "A-Yo"
11. "Romantic"
12. "Obsession"
13. "Graze"
14. "Replay (Kimi wa Boku no Everything)" (Japanese ver.)
15. "Love Like Oxygen" (Japanese ver.)
16. "Quasimodo"
17. "Life"
18. "Ring Ding Dong"
19. "Up & Down"
20. "Ready or Not"
21. "Lucifer" (Japanese ver.)
22. "JoJo" (Japanese ver.) (Encore)
23. "Bodyguard" (Japanese ver.) (Encore)
24. "One" (Japanese ver.) (Encore)
25. "Finale" (Thanks) (Encore)
26. Shinee – The 1st Concert in Japan "Shinee World" Offshoot Document Movie (Bonus Movie)
