= Shinee World the Best 2018 =

2018 concert tour by Shinee

- Japan tour by Shinee
- Location: Japan
- Associated album: Shinee the Best from Now On
- Start date: February 17, 2018
- End date: February 27, 2018
- No. of shows: 4

Shinee concert chronology
- Shinee World 2017 (2017); Shinee World the Best 2018 (2018); Beyond Live – Shinee: Shinee World (2021)

Shinee World the Best 2018 (promoted as "SHINee WORLD THE BEST 2018～FROM NOW ON～") was the sixth Japan concert tour by South Korean boy band Shinee. This tour was described as a culmination of Shinee's activities in Japan since debut, kicking off in Kyocera Dome Osaka on February 17, 2018, and ending in Tokyo Dome on February 27, 2018. The associated album for this tour was Shinee the Best from Now On. The concerts drew in audiences of over 180,000.

After Jonghyun's death on December 18, 2017, the remaining members entered into discussions on whether to postpone the concerts and decided to hold them as scheduled. In the concerts, Jonghyun appeared posthumously using isolated vocal tracks and clips from previous performances being played on the video screens. For the final encore, "From Now On", which was the final track he recorded with the group, the remaining members performed with an empty space and microphone stand in the middle of the four, which was illuminated while Jonghyun's vocals were played on tape.

== Set list ==
This set list is representative of the show on February 27, 2018. It may not represent all concerts for the duration of the tour.

1. "Colors of the Season"
2. "Stranger"
3. "Everybody"
4. "Evil"
5. "Juliette"
6. "Love"
7. "Kimi ga Iru Sekai" (君がいる世界)
8. "Diamond Sky"
9. "Sherlock"
10. "Love Like Oxygen"
11. "Hello"
12. "To Your Heart"
13. "Dazzling Girl"
14. "Lucky Star"
15. "Downtown Baby"
16. "Hitchhiking"
17. "Why So Serious?"
18. "Kimi no Seide" (君のせいで)
19. "Lucifer"

Encore

20. "Sing Your Song"
21. "I'm With You"
22. "Every Time"
23. "Replay (Kimi wa Boku no Everything)" (Replay -君は僕のeverything-)
24. "From Now On"

== Schedule ==
List of concerts, showing date, city, venue, and attendance
Date	City	Venue	Attendance
February 17, 2018	Osaka	Kyocera Dome Osaka	180,000
February 18, 2018	Osaka	Kyocera Dome Osaka	180,000
February 26, 2018	Tokyo	Tokyo Dome	180,000
February 27, 2018	Tokyo	Tokyo Dome	180,000
