= Shinee World II =

2012 concert tour by Shinee

- Asia tour by Shinee
- The official poster of the tour
- Location: Asia
- Associated album: Sherlock
- Start date: July 21, 2012
- End date: December 8, 2012
- Legs: 4
- No. of shows: 6

Shinee concert chronology
- Shinee World 2012 (2012); Shinee World II (2012); Shinee World 2013 (2013)

Shinee World II (promoted as SHINee CONCERT "SHINee WORLD II") was the second concert tour by South Korean boy group, Shinee. The tour, travelling to different cities across Asia, began in Seoul on July 21, 2012.

== History ==
On July 21 and 22, 2012, Shinee began their second Asian tour at Olympic Gymnastics Arena and performed in front of 20,000 fans. Shinee stated:

It's our second concert in Korea. We gave our concert the title 'Shinee World II' because this concert will be a continuation of last year's and we plan to show our fans a totally different world of our own. We worked very hard to prepare for this concert so I think a lot of fans will be able to go home with smiles on their faces.

They held concerts in Taiwan for two days, on September 15 and 16. The group performed at the Taipei Arena in front of 18,000 fans. They held a concert at AsiaWorld–Arena in Hong Kong on October 27 with 10,000 fans. The local media such as Oriental Daily, Apple Daily and i-cable attended the press conference before the concert. On December 8, they held a concert at the Singapore Indoor Stadium. The fans prepared a fan project in the form of birthday cakes for the members Minho and Onew, who celebrated their birthdays in December.

== Album ==
On April 2, 2014, SM Entertainment released the live album to the concert, which includes two CD's with recordings from Shinee's concert in Seoul.

== Set list ==
1. "Lucifer" (Remix Ver.)
2. "Amigo" (Rock Ver.)
3. "Juliette"
4. "The Shinee World" (Rock Ver.)
5. "Always Love" (Japanese Ver.)
6. "Hello"
7. "Replay"
8. "Turn Up The Music" (Chris Brown) – Minho
9. "I Won't Give Up" (Jason Mraz) and "Passionate Goodbye (뜨거운 안녕)" (Toy feat. Lee Jee Hyeong) – Onew
10. "Get Up!" (Korn feat. Skrillex) – Taemin
11. "Hair / Judas" (Lady Gaga) – Key
12. "Internet War" (Seo Taiji) – Jonghyun feat. Taemin
13. "Seesaw" (Korean Ver.)
14. "Sherlock (Clue + Note)"
15. "Love Like Oxygen"
16. "The Reason"
17. "Amazing Grace"
18. "Hyeya (Y Si Fuera Ella)" – Jonghyun
19. "Tie A Yellow Ribbon"
20. "A-Yo"
21. "JoJo"
22. "Stranger"
23. "Ready or Not"
24. "Ring Ding Dong" (Hard Rock Remix Ver.)
25. "To Your Heart" (Japanese Ver.)
26. "Lucifer" (High Part Ver.)
27. "The Name I Loved"

Encore

28. "Bodyguard"
29. "Stand By Me"
30. "Life"

== Schedule ==
List of concerts, showing date, city, country, venue, and attendance
Date	City	Country	Venue	Attendance
July 21, 2012	Seoul	South Korea	Olympic Gymnastics Arena	20,000
July 22, 2012	Seoul	South Korea	Olympic Gymnastics Arena	20,000
September 15, 2012	Taipei	Taiwan	Taipei Arena	18,000
September 16, 2012	Taipei	Taiwan	Taipei Arena	18,000
October 27, 2012	Hong Kong	China	AsiaWorld-Arena	10,000
December 8, 2012	Singapore		Singapore Indoor Stadium	10,000
Estimated total				58,000
